= History of the Jews in Russia =

Russian Jews
יהדות רוסיה (Hebrew); Русские евреи (Russian); רוסישע ייִדן (Yiddish)
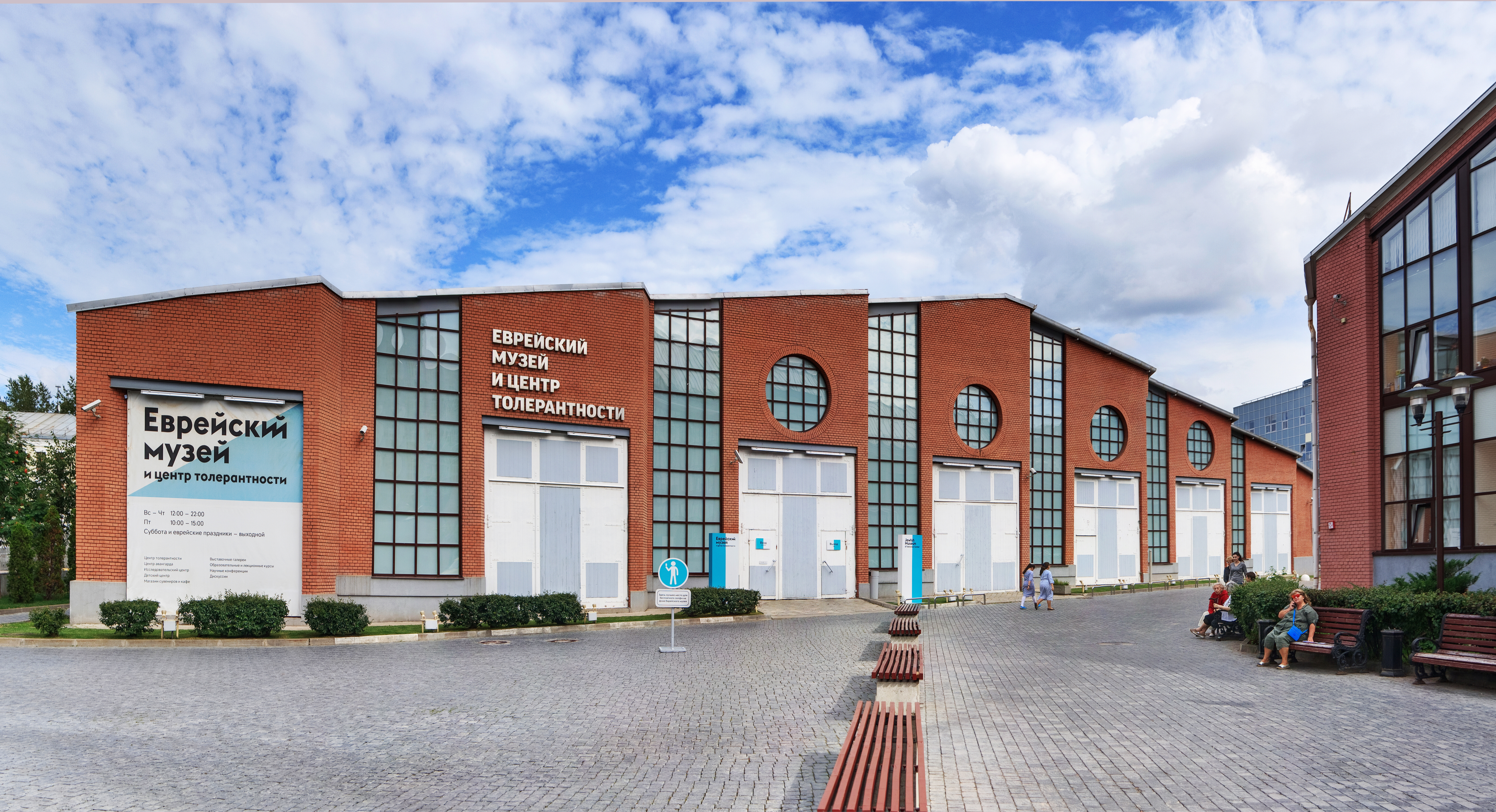
- The Jewish Museum and Tolerance Center in Moscow, the largest Jewish museum in Russia

Regions with significant populations
- Israel: 1,037,000 (all ex-Soviet, 1999) (Note: Including children born to fathers born in the former USSR)
- United States: 350,000 (all ex-Soviet, 2004)
- Germany: 178,500 (all ex-Soviet, 2011)
- Russia: > 83,896 (self-identifying, 2021) (Note: Since the 2002 Russian census, people are free to choose what ethnicity they enter on the census form, or to not enter any ethnicity.)
- Canada: 60,000
- Australia: 10,000–11,000 (all ex-Soviet, 2018)

Languages
- Russian, Yiddish, Hebrew

Religion
- Judaism, Jewish atheism

The history of the Jews in Russia goes back to the beginnings of the Russian state. At one time, the Russian Empire hosted the largest population of Jews in the world. Within these territories, the primarily Ashkenazi Jewish communities of many different areas flourished and developed many of modern Judaism's most distinctive theological and cultural traditions, and they also faced periods of antisemitic discriminatory policies and persecution, including violent pogroms.

Many analysts have documented a "renaissance" in the Jewish community inside Russia since the beginning of the 21st century; however, the Russian Jewish population has experienced precipitous decline since the dissolution of the USSR which continues to this day, although it is still among the largest in Europe.

== Overview and background ==
The largest group among Russian Jews are Ashkenazi Jews, but the community also includes a significant proportion of non-Ashkenazi from other Jewish diaspora including Mountain Jews, Sephardi Jews, Georgian Jews, Crimean Karaites, Krymchaks and Bukharan Jews.

The presence of Jewish people in the European part of Russia can be traced to the 7th–14th centuries AD. In the 11th and 12th centuries, the Jewish population in Kiev, in present-day Ukraine, was restricted to a separate quarter. Evidence of the presence of Jewish people in Muscovite Russia is first documented in the chronicles of 1471. Since the reign of Catherine II in the 18th century, Jewish people were restricted to the Pale of Settlement (1791–1917) within Russia, the territory where they could live or to which they could immigrate. The three partitions of Poland brought much additional territory to Russia, along with the Jews who were long settled in those lands. Alexander III of Russia escalated anti-Jewish policies. Beginning in the 1880s, waves of anti-Jewish pogroms swept across different regions of the empire for several decades, spurring in part a great outward migration. More than two million Jews fled Russia between 1880 and 1920, mostly to the United States and Palestine. The Pale of Settlement took away many of the rights that the Jewish people of late 17th-century Russia had enjoyed. At this time, the Jewish people were restricted to an area of what is current day Belarus, Lithuania, eastern Poland and Ukraine. Where Western Europe was experiencing Jewish emancipation at this time, in Russia, the laws for the Jewish people were getting ever-more oppressive. They were allowed to move further east, towards a less crowded region, though only a minority of Jews took this migration option. The sporadic and often impoverished communities were formed in small settlements known as shtetls.

Before 1917 there were 300,000 Zionists in Russia, while the main Jewish socialist organization, the Bund, had 33,000 members. Only 958 Jews had joined the Bolshevik Party before 1917; thousands joined after the Revolution. The chaotic years of World War I, the February and October Revolutions, and the Russian Civil War had triggered social disruption that led to antisemitism. Some 150,000 Jews were killed in the pogroms of 1918–1922, 125,000 of them were killed in Ukraine, 25,000 were killed in Belarus.

The Jewish section of the Communist Party considered the use of the Hebrew language "foreign" and "non-vernacular" and the teaching of Hebrew was replaced with the teaching of Yiddish.

Following the Russian civil war, however, the new Bolshevik government's policies inspired a flourishing of secular Jewish culture in Belarus and western Ukraine in the 1920s. The Soviet government outlawed all expressions of antisemitism, with the public use of the ethnic slur жид ("Yid") being punished by up to one year of imprisonment, and tried to modernize the Jewish community by establishing 1,100 Yiddish-language schools, 40 Yiddish-language daily newspapers and by settling Jews on farms in Ukraine and Crimea; the number of Jews working in the industry had more than doubled between 1926 and 1931. At the beginning of the 1930s, the Jews were 1.8 percent of the Soviet population but 12–15 percent of all university students. In 1934 the Soviet state established the Jewish Autonomous Oblast in the Russian Far East. This region never came to have a majority Jewish population. The JAO is Russia's only autonomous oblast and, outside of Israel, the world's only Jewish territory with an official status. The observance of the Sabbath was banned in 1929, foreshadowing the dissolution of the Communist Party's Yiddish-language Yevsektsia in 1930 and worse repression to come. Numerous Jews were victimized in Stalin's purges as "counterrevolutionaries" and "reactionary nationalists", although in the 1930s the Jews were underrepresented in the Gulag population. The share of Jews in the Soviet ruling elite declined during the 1930s, but was still more than double their proportion in the general Soviet population.

In the 1930s, many Jews held high rank in the Red Army's High Command: Generals Iona Yakir, Yan Gamarnik, Yakov Smushkevich (Commander of the Soviet Air Forces) and Grigori Shtern (Commander-in-Chief during the war against Japan and Commander at the front during the Winter War). During World War Two, an estimated 500,000 soldiers in the Red Army were Jewish; about 200,000 were killed in battle. About 160,000 were decorated, and more than a hundred achieved the rank of Red Army general. Over 150 were designated Heroes of the Soviet Union, the highest award in the country. More than two million Soviet Jews are believed to have died during the Holocaust in warfare and in Nazi-occupied territories. In the late 1980s and early 1990s, many Soviet Jews took the opportunity of liberalized emigration policies, with more than half of the population leaving, most for the United States, Israel, Germany, Canada and Australia. For many years during this period, Russia had a higher rate of immigration to Israel than any other country. Russia's Jewish population is still the third biggest in Europe, after France and United Kingdom. In November 2012, the Jewish Museum and Tolerance Center, one of the world's biggest museums of Jewish history, opened in Moscow.

== History ==
=== Classical antiquity ===
Jewish presence is documented in classical antiquity in several locations along the northern coast of the Black Sea, within the territory of modern-day Krasnodar Krai. Among these finds is a manumission text from Phanagoria, dating to 52 AD, which consecrates freed slaves to a local synagogue (proseuche), with the latter serving as their legal guardian. Similar patterns are attested on the opposite side of the Kerch Strait at Panticapaeum. There is also an inscription from Gorgippia (modern Anapa), dating to 59/60 AD, that mentions "Jews by race". Centuries later, Jerome, a Christian writer who flourished in the late 4th and early 5th centuries AD, mentions a Jewish tradition concerning the settlement of Jewish captives by Hadrian in the Cimmerian Bosporus, likely in the aftermath of the Bar Kokhba revolt of 132–136 which was suppressed by Hadrian.

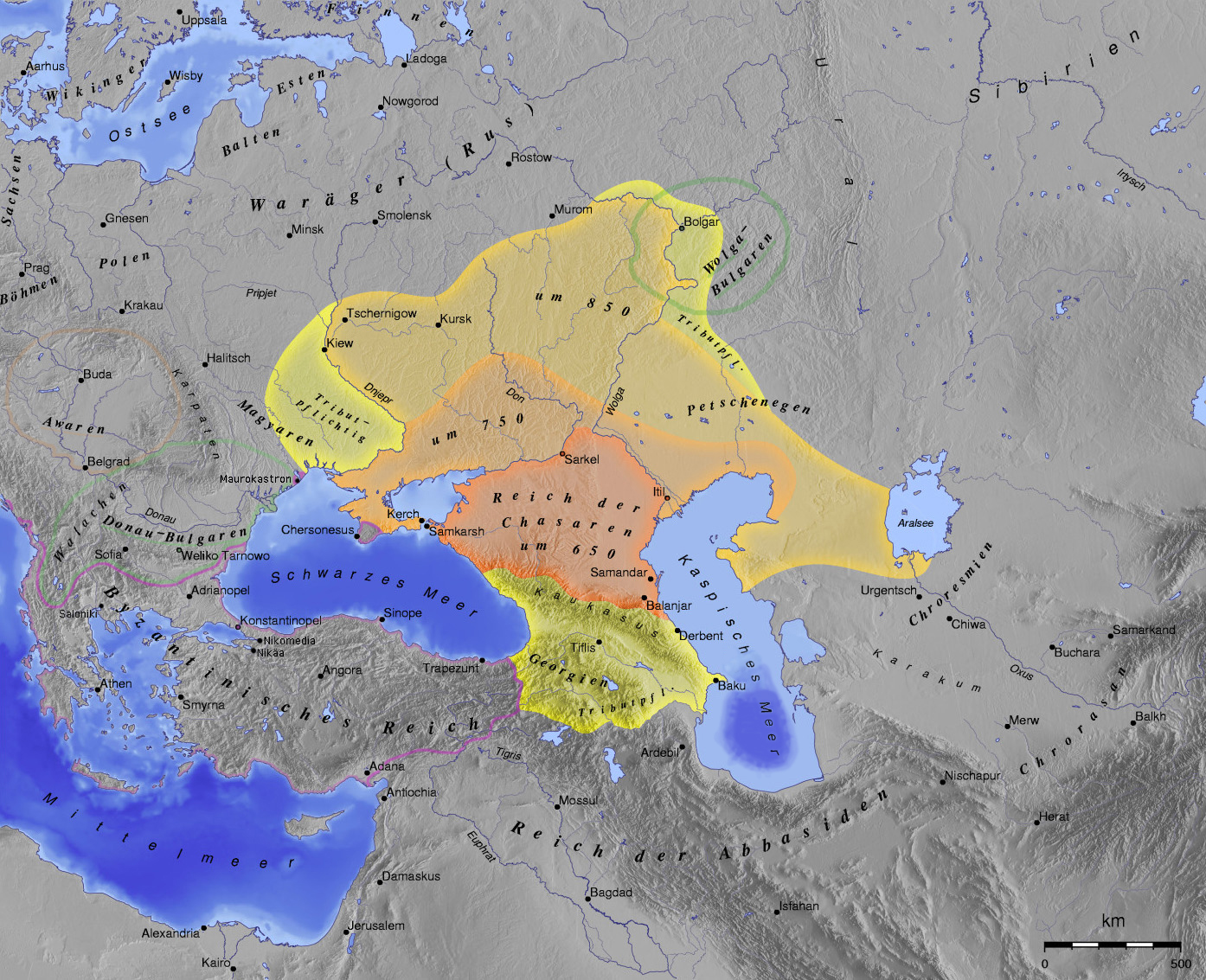
The Khazar Khaganate (650–850)

=== Kievan Rus' ===
In the 11th and 12th centuries, the Jewish population may have been restricted to a separate quarter in Kiev, known as the Jewish Town (Old East Slav: Жидове, Zhidovye, i.e. "The Jews"), the gates probably leading to which were known as the Jewish Gates (Old East Slavic: Жидовская ворота, Zhidovskaya vorota). The Kievan community was oriented towards Byzantium (the Romaniotes), Babylonia and Palestine in the 10th and 11th centuries, but appears to have been increasingly open to the Ashkenazim from the 12th century on. Few products of Kievan Jewish intellectual activity exist, however. Other communities, or groups of individuals, are known from Chernigov and, probably, Volodymyr-Volynskyi. At that time, Jews were probably found also in northeastern Russia, in the domains of Prince Andrei Bogolyubsky (1169–1174), although it is uncertain to which degree they would have been living there permanently.

=== Polish-Lithuanian Commonwealth ===
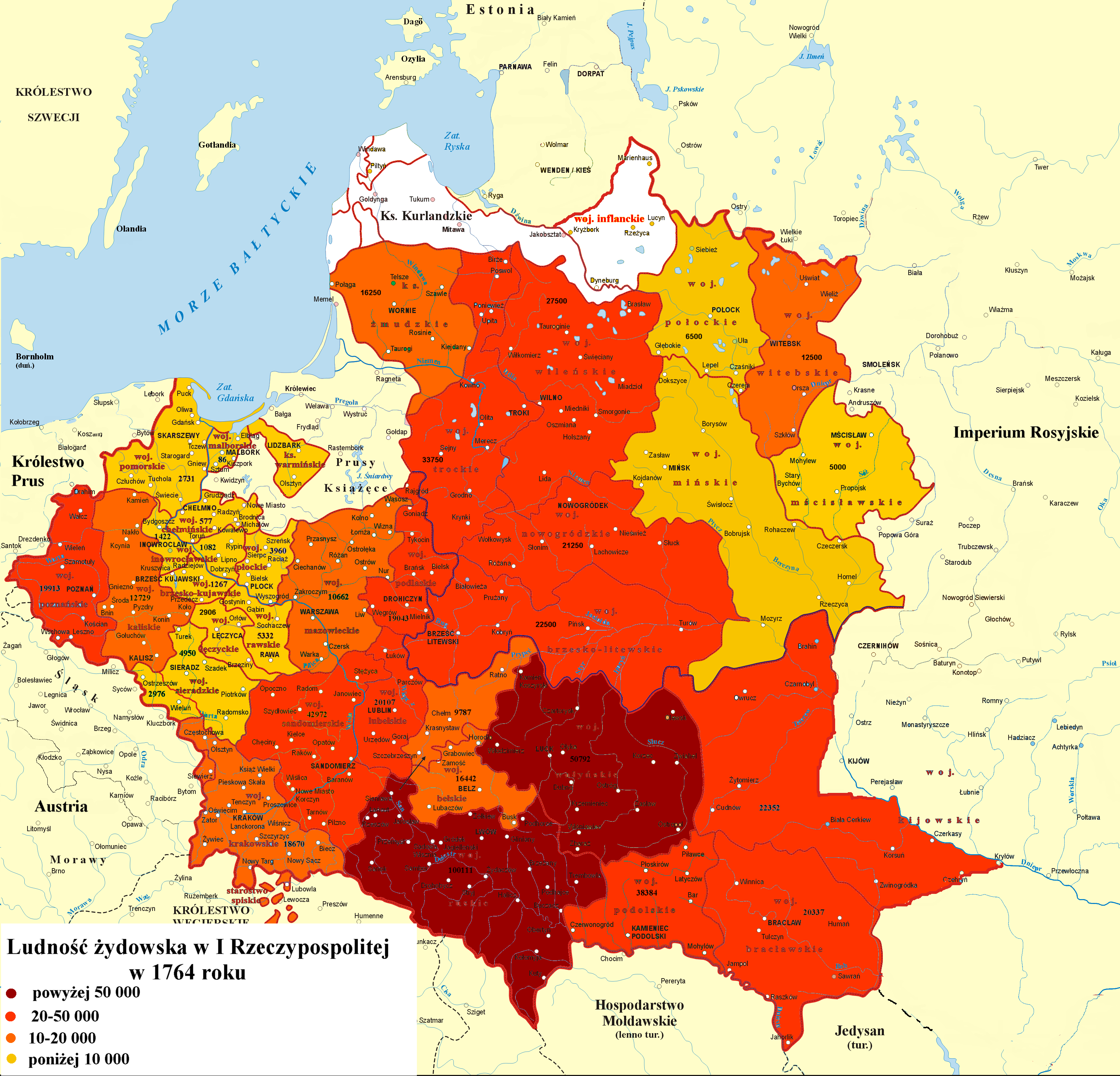
Number of Jews in Polish-Lithuanian Commonwealth per voivodeship in 1764

Although northeastern Russia had a low Jewish population, countries just to its west had rapidly growing Jewish populations, as waves of anti-Jewish pogroms and expulsions from the countries of Western Europe marked the last centuries of the Middle Ages, a sizable portion of the Jewish populations there moved to the more tolerant countries of Central and Eastern Europe, as well as the Middle East.

Expelled en masse from England, France, Spain and most other Western European countries at various times, and persecuted in Germany in the 14th century, many Western European Jews migrated to Poland upon the invitation of Polish ruler Casimir III the Great to settle in Polish-controlled areas of Eastern Europe as a third estate, although restricted to commercial, middleman services in an agricultural society for the Polish king and nobility between 1330 and 1370, during the reign of Casimir the Great.

After settling in Poland (later Polish–Lithuanian Commonwealth) and Hungary (later Austria-Hungary), the population expanded into the lightly populated areas of Ukraine and Lithuania, which were to become part of the expanding Russian Empire. In 1495, Alexander the Jagiellonian expelled Jewish residents from Grand Duchy of Lithuania, but reversed his decision in 1503.

In the shtetls populated almost entirely by Jews, or in the middle-sized town where Jews constituted a significant part of population, Jewish communities traditionally ruled themselves according to halakha, and were limited by the privileges granted them by local rulers. (See also Shtadlan). These Jews were not assimilated into the larger eastern European societies, and identified as an ethnic group with a unique set of religious beliefs and practices, as well as an ethnically unique economic role.

=== Tsardom of Russia ===
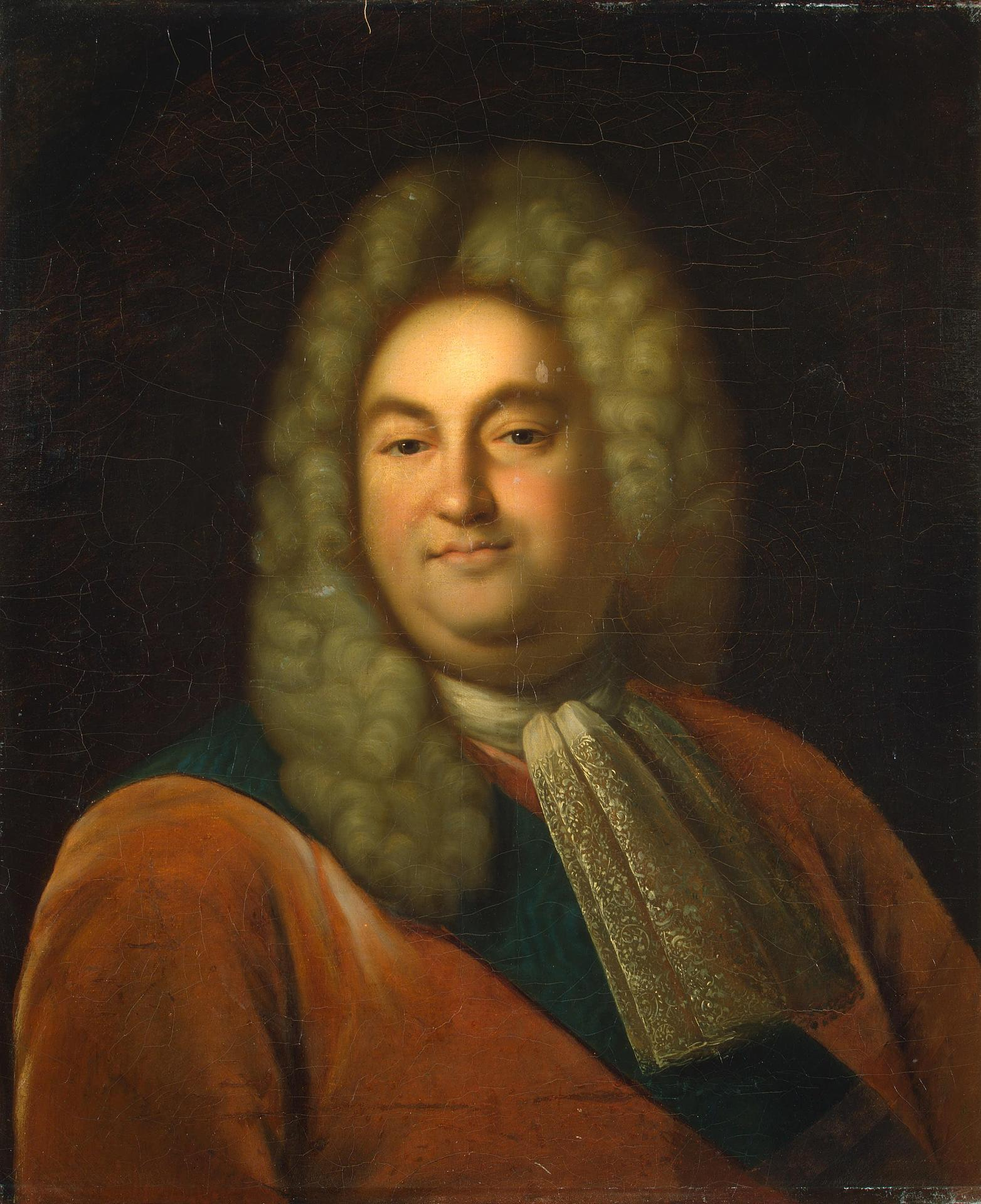
Peter Shafirov, vice-chancellor of Russia under Peter the Great

Documentary evidence as to the presence of Jews in Muscovite Russia is first found in the chronicles of 1471. The relatively small population of them were subject to discriminatory laws, but these laws do not appear to have been enforced at all times. Jews residing in Russian and Ukrainian towns suffered numerous religious persecutions. Converted Jews occasionally rose to important positions in the Russian State, for example Peter Shafirov, vice-chancellor under Peter the Great. Shafirov came, as most Russian Jews after the fall of the Polish–Lithuanian Commonwealth in 1795, from a Jewish family of Polish origin. He had extraordinary knowledge of foreign languages and served as the chief translator in the Russian Foreign Office, subsequently he began to accompany Tsar Peter on his international travels. Following this, he was raised to the rank of vice-chancellor because of his many diplomatic talents and skills, but was later imprisoned, sentenced to death, and eventually banished.

=== Russian Empire ===
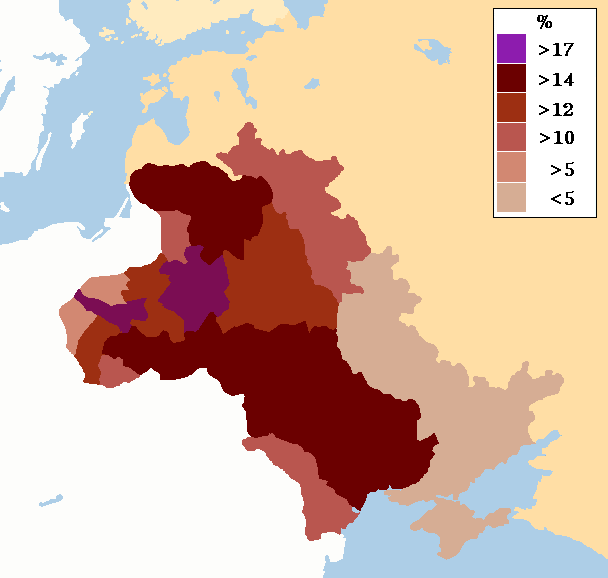
Map of the Pale of Settlement, showing percentage of Jewish populations

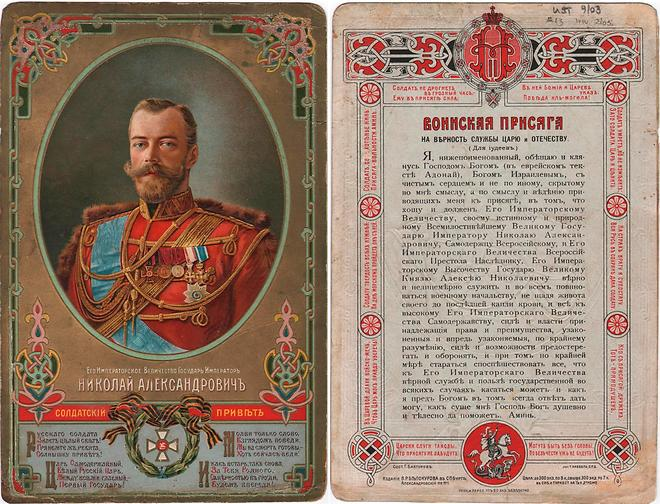
Military oath to Nicholas II for the adherents of Judaism

Their situation changed radically during the reign of Catherine II, when the Russian Empire acquired large Lithuanian and Polish territories which historically included a high proportion of Jewish residents, especially during the second (1793) and the third (1795) Partitions of Poland. Under the Commonwealth's legal system, Jews endured economic restrictions euphemised as "disabilities", which also continued following the Russian occupation. Catherine established the Pale of Settlement, which included Congress Poland, Lithuania, Ukraine, Belarus, Bessarabia, and Crimea (the latter was later excluded). Jews were required to live within the Pale and could not migrate elsewhere in Russia without special permission. Jewish residents were permitted to vote in municipal elections within the Pale. Their vote was limited to one-third of the total number of voters, even though their proportion in many areas was much higher, and even a majority. This provided an aura of democracy while institutionalizing local interethnic conflict.

Jewish communities in Russia were governed internally by local administrative bodies called the Councils of Elders (qahal, kehilla), constituted in every town or hamlet possessing a Jewish population. These councils had jurisdiction over Jews in matters of internal litigation, as well as fiscal transactions relating to the collection and payment of taxes (poll tax, land tax, etc.). Later, this right of collecting taxes was much abused, and the councils lost civil authority in 1844.

Under Alexander I and Nicholas I, decrees were put forth requiring a Russian-speaking member of a Jewish community to be named to act as an intermediary between his community and the Imperial government to perform certain civil duties, such as registering births, marriages, and divorces. This position came to be known as the crown rabbi. However, they were not always rabbis and often were not respected by members of their communities because their main job qualification was fluency in Russian. They often had no education in or knowledge of Jewish law. The beginning of the 19th century was marked by the intensive movement of Jews to Novorossiya, where towns, villages and agricultural colonies rapidly sprang up.

In the 19th century, Jews were legally a subcategory of the inorodtsy category, a special ethnicity-based category of the non-Slavic population that received special treatment under the law.

==== Forcible conscription of Jewish cantonists ====
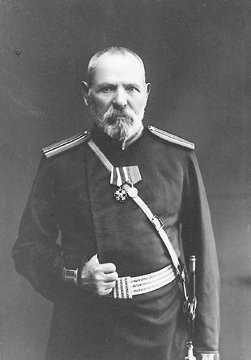
Cantonist Herzel Yankel Tsam. After 1827, Jewish boys were forcibly conscripted to military service at the age of twelve and placed in cantonist schools.

The 'decree of August 26, 1827' made Jews liable for military service and allowed their conscription between the ages of twelve and twenty-five. Each year, the Jewish community had to supply four recruits per thousand of the population. However, in practice, Jewish children were often conscripted as young as eight or nine years old. At the age of twelve, they would be placed for their six-year military education in cantonist schools. They were then required to serve in the Imperial Russian Army for 25 years after completing their studies, often never seeing their families again. Strict quotas were imposed on all communities, and the qahals were given the unpleasant task of implementing conscription within the Jewish communities. Since the merchant-guild members, agricultural colonists, factory mechanics, clergy, and all Jews with secondary education were exempt, and the wealthy bribed their way out of having their children conscripted, fewer potential conscripts were available; the adopted policy deeply sharpened internal Jewish social tensions. Seeking to protect the socio-economic and religious integrity of Jewish society, the qahals did their best to include “non-useful Jews” in the draft lists so that the heads of tax-paying middle-class families were predominantly exempt from conscription. In contrast, single Jews, as well as "heretics" (maskilim "Haskalah-influenced individuals"), paupers, outcasts, and orphaned children were drafted. They used their power to suppress protests and intimidate potential informers who sought to expose the arbitrariness of the qahal to the Russian government. In some cases, communal elders had the most threatening informers murdered (such as the Ushitsa case, 1836).

The zoning rule was suspended during the Crimean War, when conscription became annual. During this period, qahal leaders would employ informers and kidnappers (Russian: ловчики, romanized: lovčikij, Yiddish: khappers), as many potential conscripts preferred to run away rather than voluntarily submit. In the case of unfulfilled quotas, younger Jewish boys of eight and even younger were frequently taken. The official Russian policy was to encourage the religious conversion of hazzanim to the state religion, the Russian Orthodox Church, and Jewish boys were coerced into baptism. As kosher food was unavailable, they were faced with the necessity of abandoning dietary laws. Polish Catholic boys were subject to similar pressure to convert and assimilate because the Empire was hostile both to Catholicism and Polish nationalism.

==== Haskalah in the Russian Empire ====
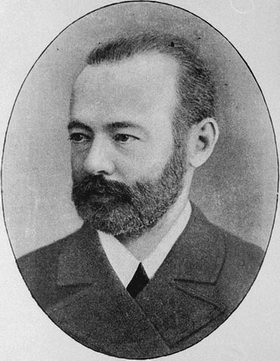
Samuel Polyakov, nicknamed the "most famous railroad king" of the 19th century. He co-founded the World ORT in the 1880s, the largest Jewish education organization in the Russian Empire, perpetuating a vocational education program influenced by the values of Haskalah.

The cultural and habitual isolation of the Jews gradually began eroding. An ever-increasing number of Jewish people adopted Russian customs and the Russian language. Russian education was spread among the Jewish population. Several Jewish-Russian periodicals appeared.

Alexander II was known as "Tsar liberator" for the abolition of serfdom in 1861. Under his rule, Jews could not hire Christian servants, could not own land, and were restricted in travel.

Alexander III was a staunch reactionary and an antisemite (influenced by Pobedonostsev) who strictly adhered to the old doctrine of Orthodoxy, Autocracy, and Nationality. His escalation of anti-Jewish policies sought to ignite "popular antisemitism," which portrayed the Jews as "Christ-killers" and the oppressors of Christian Slav victims.

A large-scale wave of pogroms swept Ukraine in 1881, after Jews were scapegoated for the assassination of Alexander II. In the 1881 outbreak, there were pogroms in 166 Ukrainian towns, thousands of Jewish homes were destroyed, many families reduced to extremes of poverty; large numbers of men, women, and children were injured, and some were killed. Disorders in the south again drew the government's attention to the Jewish question. A conference was convened at the Ministry of Interior, and on May 15, 1882, so-called Temporary Regulations were introduced that stayed in effect for more than thirty years and became known as the May Laws.

The repressive legislation was repeatedly revised. Many historians noted the concurrence of these state-enforced antisemitic policies with waves of pogroms that continued until 1884, with at least tacit government knowledge and in some cases, policemen were seen inciting or joining the mob. The systematic policy of discrimination banned Jewish people from rural areas and towns of fewer than ten thousand people, even within the Pale, assuring the slow death of many shtetls. In 1887, the quotas placed on the number of Jews allowed into secondary and higher education were tightened down to 10% within the Pale, 5% outside the Pale, except Moscow and Saint Petersburg, held at 3%, even though the Jewish population was a majority or plurality in many communities. It was possible to evade these restrictions upon secondary education by combining private tuition with examination as an "outside student." Accordingly, within the Pale, such outside pupils were almost entirely young Jews. The restrictions placed on education, traditionally highly valued in Jewish communities, resulted in an ambition to excel over peers and increased emigration rates. Special quotas restricted Jews from entering the profession of law, limiting the number of Jews admitted to the bar.

In 1886, an Edict of Expulsion was enforced on the historic Jewish population of Kiev. Most Jews were expelled from Moscow in 1891 (except few deemed useful) and a newly built synagogue was closed by the city's authorities headed by the Tsar's brother. Tsar Alexander III refused to curtail repressive practices and reportedly noted: "But we must never forget that the Jews have crucified our Master and have shed his precious blood."

In 1892, new measures banned Jewish participation in local elections despite their large numbers in many towns of the Pale. The Town Regulations prohibited Jews from the right to elect or be elected to town Dumas. Only a small number of Jews were allowed to be members of a town Duma, through appointment by special committees.

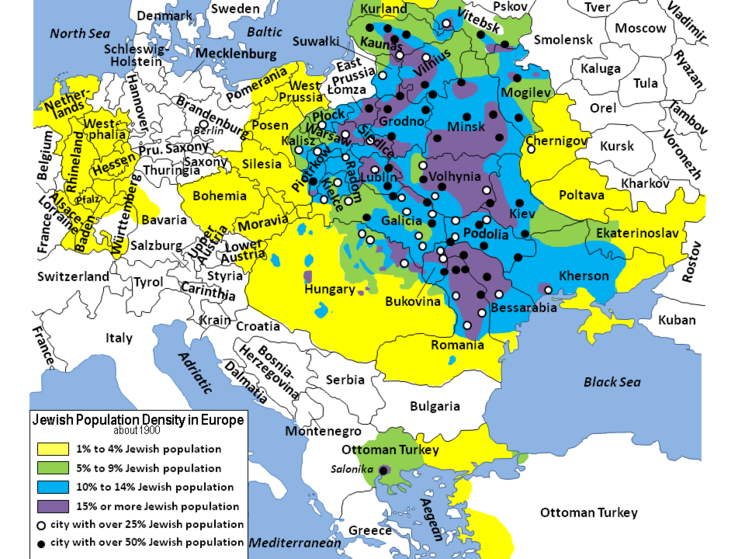
Distribution of Jews in Europe around 1900

During the late 19th and early 20th centuries, the Russian Empire had not only the largest Jewish population in the world, but actually a majority of the world's Jews living within its borders. In 1897, according to Russian census of 1897, the total Jewish population of Russia was 5,189,401 persons of both sexes (4.13% of the total population). Of this total, 93.9% lived in the 25 provinces of the Pale of Settlement. The total population of the Pale of Settlement amounted to 42,338,367—of these, 4,805,354 (11.5%) were Jews.

About 450,000 Jewish soldiers served in the Russian Army during World War I, and fought side by side with their Slavic fellows. When hundreds of thousands of refugees from Poland and Lithuania, among them innumerable Jews, fled in terror before enemy invasion, the Pale of Settlement de facto ceased to exist. Most of the education restrictions on the Jews were removed with the appointment of Count Pavel Ignatiev as Minister of Education.

==== Mass emigration ====
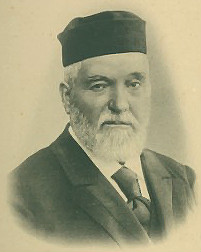
Kalonimus Wolf Wissotzky founded Wissotzky Tea in 1849, which would become the largest tea manufacturer in the Russian Empire and the world. In response to the pogroms of the 1880s, he funded the Hovevei Zion movement to encourage immigration to Ottoman Palestine. The family tea company itself was seized and confiscated by the Bolsheviks after 1917.

Even though the persecutions provided the impetus for mass emigration, other relevant factors account for the Jews' migration. After the first years of large emigration from Russia, positive feedback from the emigrants in the U.S. encouraged further emigration. Indeed, more than two million Jews fled Russia between 1880 and 1920. While a large majority emigrated to the United States, some turned to Zionism. In 1882, members of Bilu and Hovevei Zion made what came to be known as the First Aliyah to Palestine, then a part of the Ottoman Empire.

The Tsarist government sporadically encouraged Jewish emigration. In 1890, it approved the establishment of "The Society for the Support of Jewish Farmers and Artisans in Syria and Palestine" (known as the "Odessa Committee" headed by Leon Pinsker) dedicated to practical aspects in establishing agricultural Jewish settlements in Palestine.

Jewish emigration from Russia, 1880–1928
| Destination | Number |
|---|---|
| Australia | 5,000 |
| Canada | 70,000 |
| Europe | 240,000 |
| Palestine | 45,000 |
| South Africa | 45,000 |
| South America | 111,000 |
| United States | 1,749,000 |

==== Jewish members of the Duma ====
In total, there were at least twelve Jewish deputies in the First Duma (1906–1907), falling to three or four in the Second Duma (February 1907 to June 1907), two in the Third Duma (1907–1912) and again three in the fourth, elected in 1912. Converts to Christianity like Mikhail Herzenstein and Ossip Pergament were still considered as Jews by the public (and antisemitic) opinion and are most of the time included in these figures.

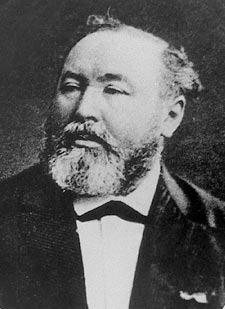
Osip Gunzburg, founder of the Society for the Promotion of Culture among the Jews of Russia and the father of Horace Günzburg.

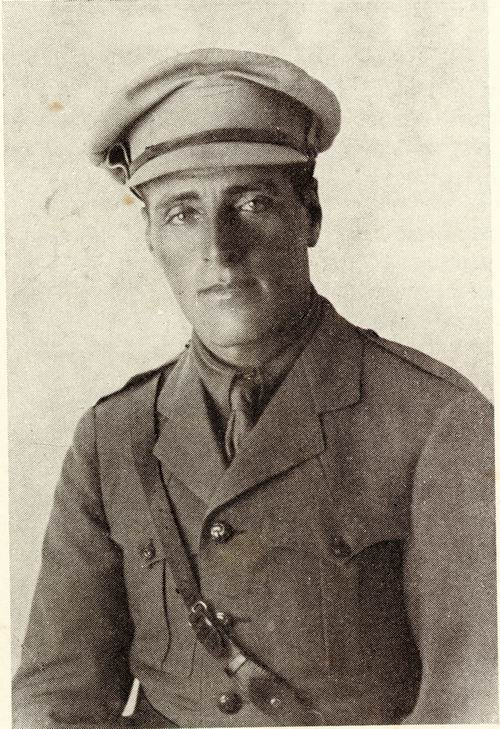
Joseph Trumpeldor, the most decorated Jewish soldier in the Imperial Russian Army for his bravery in the Russo-Japanese War, before conducting operations in the Ottoman Empire.

At the 1906 elections, the Jewish Labour Bund had made an electoral agreement with the Lithuanian Labourers' Party (Trudoviks), which resulted in the election to the Duma of two (non-Bundist) candidates in the Lithuanian provinces: Dr. Shmaryahu Levin for the Vilnius province and Leon Bramson for the Kaunas province.

Among the other Jewish deputies were Maxim Vinaver, chairman of the League for the Attainment of Equal Rights for the Jewish People in Russia (Folksgrupe) and cofounder of the Constitutional Democratic Party (Kadets), Dr. Nissan Katzenelson (Courland province, Zionist, Kadet), Dr. Moisei Yakovlevich Ostrogorsky (Grodno province), attorney Simon Yakovlevich Rosenbaum (Minsk province, Zionist, Kadet), Mikhail Isaakovich Sheftel (Ekaterinoslav province, Kadet), Dr. Grigory Bruk, Dr. Benyamin Yakubson, Zakhar Frenkel, Solomon Frenkel, Meilakh Chervonenkis. There was also a Crimean Karaim deputy, Salomon Krym.

Three of the Jewish deputies, Bramson, Chervonenkis and Yakubson, joined the Labour faction; nine others joined the Kadet fraction. According to Rufus Learsi, five of them were Zionists, including Dr. Shmaryahu Levin, Dr. Victor Jacobson and Simon Yakovlevich Rosenbaum.

Two of them, Grigori Borisovich Iollos (Poltava province) and Mikhail Herzenstein (b. 1859, d. 1906 in Terijoki), both from the Constitutional Democratic Party, were assassinated by the Black Hundreds antisemite terrorist group. "The Russkoye Znamya declares openly that 'Real Russians' assassinated Herzenstein and Iollos with knowledge of officials, and expresses regret that only two Jews perished in crusade against revolutionaries.

The Second Duma included seven Jewish deputies: Shakho Abramson, Iosif Gessen, Vladimir Matveevich Gessen, Lazar Rabinovich, Yakov Shapiro (all of them Kadets) and Avigdor Mandelberg (Siberia Social Democrat), plus a convert to Christianity, the attorney Ossip Pergament (Odessa).

The two Jewish members of the Third Duma were the Judge Leopold Nikolayevich (or Lazar) Nisselovich (Courland province, Kadet) and Naftali Markovich Friedman (Kaunas province, Kadet). Ossip Pergament was reelected and died before the end of his mandate.

Friedman was the only one reelected to the Fourth Duma in 1912, joined by two new deputies, Meer Bomash, and Dr. Ezekiel Gurevich.

==== Jews in the revolutionary movement ====
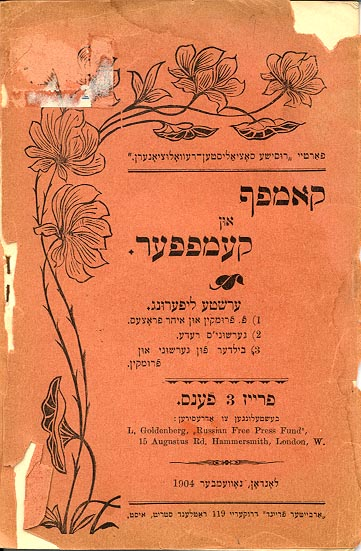
Kampf un kempfer – a Yiddish pamphlet published by the PSR exile branch in London 1904.

Many Jews were prominent in Russian revolutionary parties. The idea of overthrowing the Tsarist regime was attractive to many members of the Jewish intelligentsia because of the oppression of non-Russian nations and non-Orthodox Christians within the Russian Empire. For much the same reason, many non-Russians, notably Latvians or Poles, were disproportionately represented in the party leaderships.

In 1897 General Jewish Labour Bund (The Bund), was formed. Many Jews joined the ranks of two principal revolutionary parties: Socialist-Revolutionary Party and Russian Social Democratic Labour Party—both Bolshevik and Menshevik factions. A notable number of Bolshevik party members were ethnically Jewish, especially in the leadership of the party, and the percentage of Jewish party members among the rival Mensheviks was even higher. Both the founders and leaders of Menshevik faction, Julius Martov and Pavel Axelrod, were Jewish.

Because some of the leading Bolsheviks were ethnic Jews, and Bolshevism supports a policy of promoting international proletarian revolution—most notably in the case of Leon Trotsky—many enemies of Bolshevism, as well as contemporary antisemites, draw a picture of Communism as a political slur at Jews and accuse Jews of pursuing Bolshevism to benefit Jewish interests, reflected in the terms Jewish Bolshevism or Judeo-Bolshevism. The original atheistic and internationalistic ideology of the Bolsheviks (See proletarian internationalism, bourgeois nationalism) was incompatible with Jewish traditionalism. Bolsheviks such as Trotsky echoed sentiments dismissing Jewish heritage in place of "internationalism".

==== World War I ====
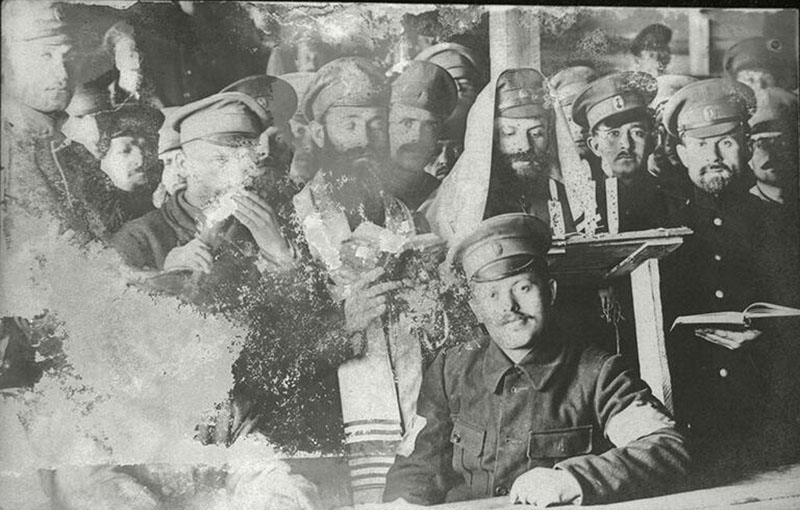
Russian Jewish soldiers praying, blowing the shofar on Rosh Hashanah

The onset of World War I was marked not only by an outpouring of patriotic statements in the Russian Jewish press but also by the enlistment of nearly 400,000 Jews in the Russian Imperial Army (of whom some 80,000 served at the front during the 1914–1915 campaigns).

However, Jews were quickly charged with treachery by some Russian military leaders and right-wing politicians, and more than half a million Jews were expelled from western regions of the Russian Empire close to the frontline to the interior of Russia on the grounds that they might collaborate with the enemy. Others fled from the frontline areas voluntary. Ironically, all this broke the confinement of the Russian Jews to the Pale of Settlement.

=== Revolution and civil war ===
For Russia the year 1917 brought two revolutions: February Revolution that ended the tsarist rule and the October Revolution that started the long-lasting Bolshevik rule. After the February Revolution Jews gained full equality with all other Russian citizens and many became active in politics. There were about 3,000 people in the Russian political elite in the interrevolutionary months of 1917 and more than 300 of them were Jewish, twice the proportion of Jews in the Russian population as a whole.

Jews were prominent in the Russian Constitutional Democrat Party, Russian Social Democratic Party (Mensheviks) and Socialist-Revolutionary Party. The Russian Anarchist movement also included many prominent Jewish revolutionaries. In Ukraine, Makhnovist anarchist leaders also included several Jews.

Soon after seizing power, the Bolsheviks established the Yevsektsiya, the Jewish section of the Communist party in order to destroy the rival Bund and Zionist parties, suppress Judaism and replace traditional Jewish culture with "proletarian culture".

The chaotic years of World War I, the February and October Revolutions, and the Russian Civil War were fertile ground for the antisemitism that was endemic to tsarist Russia. During the Russian Civil War the Jewish communities of Ukraine, and to a lesser extent Belarus, suffered the worst pogroms ever to take place in these regions. They were performed by various armed units: by the White Army of Anton Denikin, by troops of the Ukrainian People's Republic headed by Symon Petliura, by gangs of warlord atamans and "Green" insurgent peasants, and even by some Red Army units. 31,071 civilian Jews were killed during documented pogroms throughout the former Russian Empire; the number of Jewish orphans exceeded 300,000. A majority of pogroms in Ukraine during 1918–1920 were perpetrated by the Ukrainian nationalists, miscellaneous bands and anti-Communist forces.

| Perpetrator | Number of pogroms or excesses | Number murdered |
|---|---|---|
| Hryhoriv's bands | 52 | 3,471 |
| Directory of the Ukrainian National Republic | 493 | 16,706 |
| White army | 213 | 5,235 |
| Miscellaneous bands | 307 | 4,615 |
| Red Army | 106 | 725 |
| Others | 33 | 185 |
| Polish army | 32 | 134 |
| Total | 1,236 | 31,071 |

In February 1918, as German forces advanced on the capital of Petrograd, the Soviet government signed the Treaty of Brest-Litovsk, which stipulated that Russia would withdraw from World War I and cede large swaths of territory in eastern Russia to the German Empire. Even after the signing of the treaty, however, the Germans continued to advance and seize territory, as the Soviets had no choice but to retreat across Ukraine. At this point in the war, the Red Army comprised mostly untrained workers and peasants with no overarching command structure, leaving the state with virtually no control over the volunteer forces. Between March and May 1918, various Red Army squadrons, embittered by their military defeat and animated by revolutionary sentiment, attacked Jews in cities and towns across the Chernihiv region of Ukraine. One of the most brutal instances of this violence occurred in the city of Novhorod-Siverskyi, where it was reported that 88 Jews were killed and 11 injured in a pogrom incited by Red Army soldiers. Similarly, after the successful capture of the city of Hlukhiv, the Red Army murdered at least 100 Jews, whom the soldiers accused of being 'exploiters of the proletariat.' In all, Jewish activist Nahum Gergel estimated that the Red forces were responsible for about 8.6% of pogroms during the years 1918–1922, while Ukrainian and White Army forces were responsible for 40% and 17.2%, respectively.

When Jewish historian Simon Dubnow heard in May 1918 about a pogrom in which Red Army soldiers took part, he noted sardonically, “We die at the hands of the Bolsheviks and are killed because of them.”

In March 1919, Vladimir Lenin delivered a speech "On Anti-Jewish Pogroms" on a gramophone disc. Lenin sought to explain the phenomenon of antisemitism in Marxist terms. According to Lenin, antisemitism was an "attempt to divert the hatred of the workers and peasants from the exploiters toward the Jews". Linking antisemitism to class struggle, he argued that it was merely a political technique used by the tsar to exploit religious fanaticism, popularize the despotic, unpopular regime, and divert popular anger toward a scapegoat. The Soviet Union also officially maintained this Marxist-Leninist interpretation under Joseph Stalin, who expounded Lenin's critique of antisemitism. However, this did not prevent the widely publicized repressions of Jewish intellectuals during 1948–1953 when Stalin increasingly associated Jews with "cosmopolitanism" and pro-Americanism.

After 1917, the number of Jews in Russia in governmental posts and in higher education rose sharply, which later led to the myth of a Jewish association with communism and socialism.

==== Dissolution and seizure of Jewish properties and institutions ====
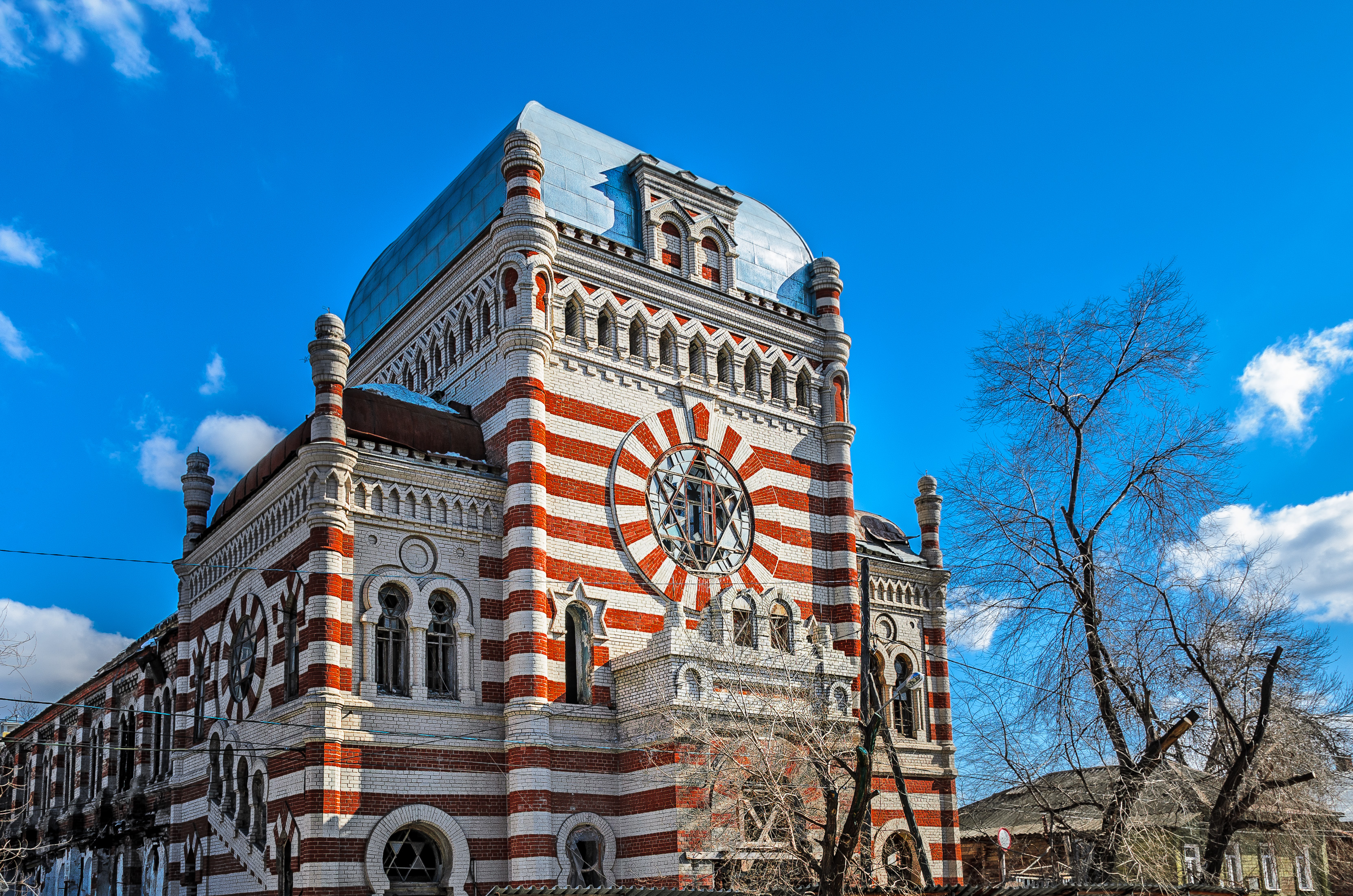
Samara Choral Synagogue in Samara. It was shut down by the Soviet Government in 1929.

The Bolshevik regime restricted Jewish religious practice and education in Hebrew.

In August 1919 Jewish properties, including synagogues, were seized and many Jewish communities were dissolved. New laws against all expressions of religion and religious education were imposed upon Jews and other religious groups. Many Rabbis and other religious officials were forced to resign from their posts under the threat of violent persecution. This type of persecution continued into the 1920s.

In 1921, a large number of Jews opted for Poland, as the Peace of Riga entitled them to choose the country they preferred. Several hundred thousand joined the already numerous Jewish population of Poland.

=== Soviet Union ===
==== Before World War II ====
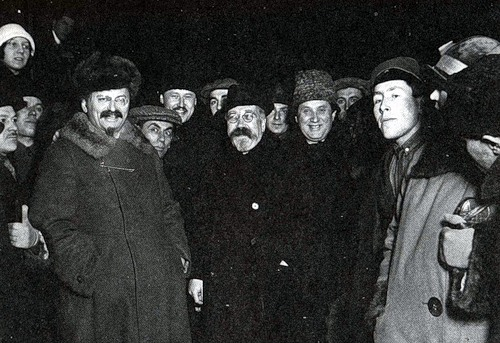
Bolshevik revolutionaries Leon Trotsky, Lev Kamenev and Grigory Zinoviev, later executed or assassinated on Stalin's orders

Continuing the policy of the Bolsheviks before the Revolution, Lenin and the Bolshevik Party strongly condemned the pogroms, including official denunciations in 1918 by the Council of People's Commissars. Opposition to the pogroms and to manifestations of Russian antisemitism in this era were complicated by both the official Bolshevik policy of assimilationism towards all national and religious minorities, and concerns about overemphasizing Jewish concerns for fear of exacerbating popular antisemitism, as the White forces were openly identifying the Bolshevik regime with Jews.

Lenin recorded eight of his speeches on gramophone records in 1919. Only seven of these were later re-recorded and put on sale. The one suppressed in the Nikita Khrushchev era recorded Lenin's feelings on antisemitism:

The Tsarist police, in alliance with the landowners and the capitalists, organized pogroms against the Jews. The landowners and capitalists tried to divert the hatred of the workers and peasants who were tortured by want against the Jews. ... Only the most ignorant and downtrodden people can believe the lies and slander that are spread about the Jews. ... It is not the Jews who are the enemies of the working people. The enemies of the workers are the capitalists of all countries. Among the Jews there are working people, and they form the majority. They are our brothers, who, like us, are oppressed by capital; they are our comrades in the struggle for socialism. Among the Jews there are kulaks, exploiters and capitalists, just as there are among the Russians, and among people of all nations... Rich Jews, like rich Russians, and the rich in all countries, are in alliance to oppress, crush, rob and disunite the workers... Shame on accursed Tsarism, which tortured and persecuted the Jews. Shame on those who foment hatred towards the Jews, who foment hatred towards other nations.

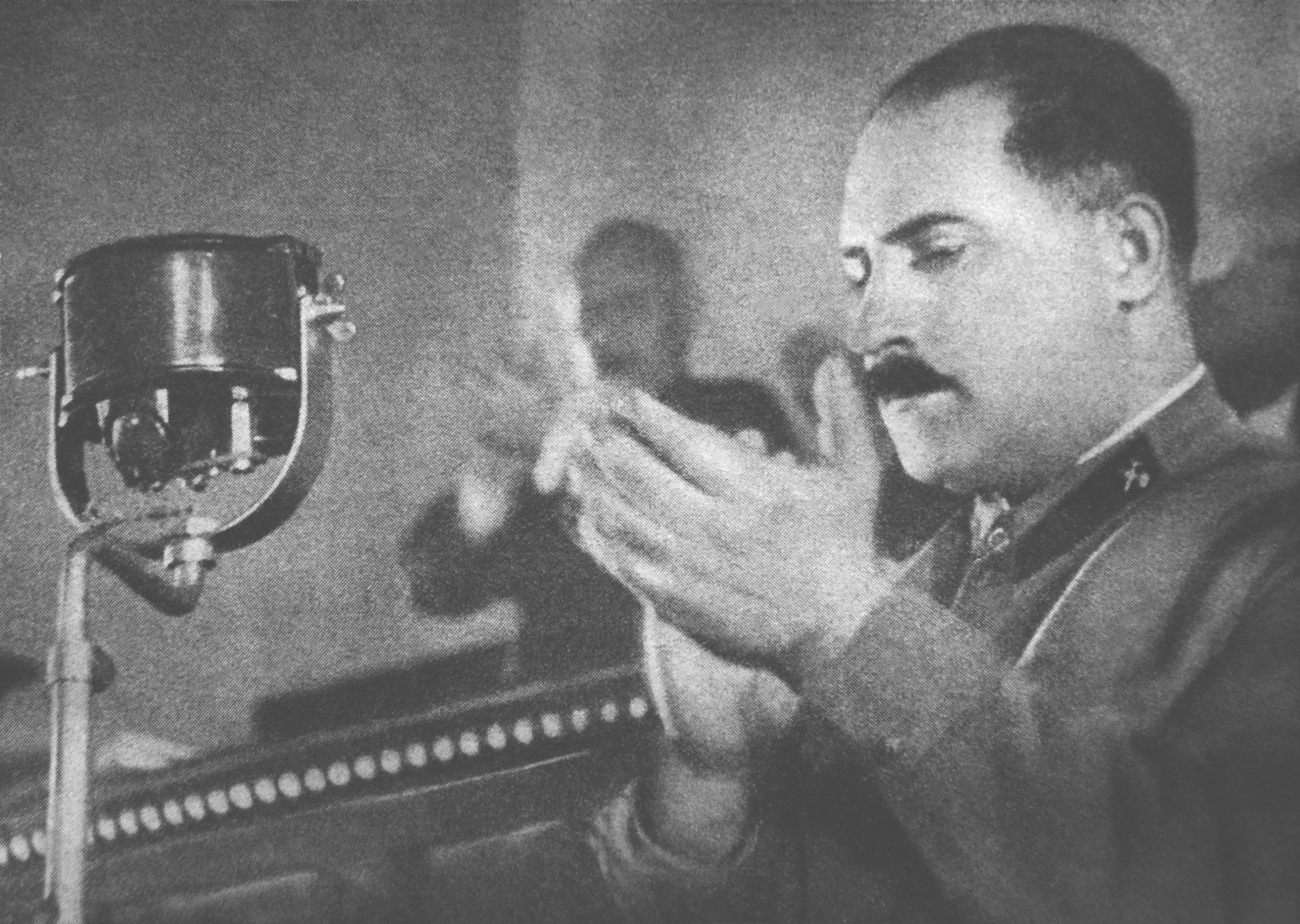
Soviet politician and administrator Lazar Kaganovich in 1936

Lenin was supported by the Labor Zionist (Poale Zion) movement, then under the leadership of Marxist theorist Ber Borochov, which was fighting for the creation of a Jewish workers' state in Palestine and also participated in the October Revolution (and in the Soviet political scene afterwards until being banned by Stalin in 1928). While Lenin remained opposed to outward forms of antisemitism (and all forms of racism), allowing Jewish people to rise to the highest offices in both party and state, certain historians such as Dmitri Volkogonov argue that the record of his government in this regard was highly uneven. A former official Soviet historian (turned staunch anti-communist), Volkogonov claims that Lenin was aware of pogroms carried out by units of the Red Army during the war with Poland, particularly those carried out by Semyon Budyonny's troops, though the whole issue was effectively ignored. Volkogonov writes that "While condemning antisemitism in general, Lenin was unable to analyze, let alone eradicate, its prevalence in Soviet society".

The hostility of the Soviet regime towards all religion made no exception for Judaism, and the 1921 campaign against religion saw the seizure of many synagogues (whether this should be regarded as antisemitism is a matter of definition—since Orthodox Christian churches received the same treatment). In any event, there was still a fair degree of tolerance for Jewish religious practice in the 1920s: in the Belarusian capital Minsk, for example, of the 657 synagogues existing in 1917, 547 were still functioning in 1930.

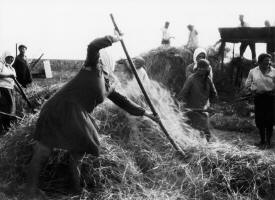
A Jewish kolkhoz. To promote Jewish agriculture, in 1925 the CPSU set up a government committee (the Komzet) and a public society (the OZET).

According to Zvi Gitelman: "Never before in Russian history—and never subsequently has a government made such an effort to uproot and stamp out antisemitism."

According to the census of 1926, the total number of Jews in the USSR was 2,672,398—of whom 59% lived in Ukrainian SSR, 15.2% in Byelorussian SSR, 22% in Russian SFSR and 3.8% in other Soviet republics.

Russian Jews were long considered to be a non-native ethnic group among the Slavic Russians, and such categorization was solidified when ethnic minorities in the Soviet Union were categorized according to ethnicity (национальность). In his 1913 theoretical work Marxism and the National Question, Stalin described Jews as "not a living and active nation, but something mystical, intangible and supernatural. For, I repeat, what sort of nation, for instance, is a Jewish nation which consists of Georgian, Daghestanian, Russian, American and other Jews, the members of which do not understand each other (since they speak different languages), inhabit different parts of the globe, will never see each other, and will never act together, whether in time of peace or in time of war?!" According to Stalin, who became the People's Commissar for Nationalities Affairs after the revolution, to qualify as a nation, a minority was required to have a culture, a language, and a homeland.

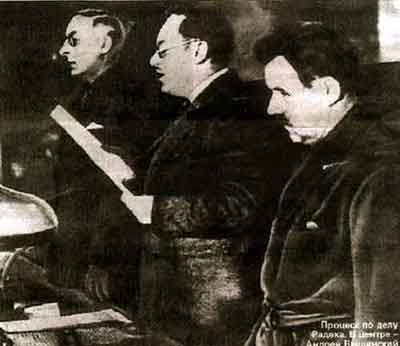
Prosecutor General Vyshinsky (centre), reading the 1937 indictment against Karl Radek during the 2nd Moscow Trial.

Yiddish, rather than Hebrew, would be the national language, and proletarian socialist literature and arts would replace Judaism as the quintessence of culture. The use of Yiddish was strongly encouraged in the 1920s in areas of the USSR with substantial Jewish populations, especially in the Ukrainian and Belarusian Soviet Socialist Republics. Yiddish was one of the Belarusian SSR's four official languages, alongside Belarusian, Russian, and Polish. The equality of the official languages was taken seriously. A visitor arriving at main train station of the Belarusian capital Minsk saw the city's name written in all four languages above the main station entrance. Yiddish was a language of newspapers, magazines, book publishing, theater, radio, film, the post office, official correspondence, election materials, and even a Central Jewish Court. Yiddish writers like Sholem Aleichem and Mendele Mocher Seforim were celebrated in the 1920s as Soviet Jewish heroes.

Minsk had a public, state-supported Yiddish-language school system, extending from kindergarten to the Yiddish-language section of the Belarusian State University. Although Jewish students tended to switch to studying in Russian as they moved on to secondary and higher education, 55.3 percent of the city's Jewish primary school students attended Yiddish-language schools in 1927. At its peak, the Soviet Yiddish-language school system had 160,000 students in it. Such was the prestige of Minsk's Yiddish scholarship that researchers trained in Warsaw and Berlin applied for faculty positions at the university. All this leads historian Elissa Bemporad to conclude that this “very ordinary Jewish city” was in the 1920s “one of the world capitals of Yiddish language and culture."

Jews also played a disproportionate role in Belarusian politics through the Bolshevik Party's Yiddish-language branch, the Yevsekstsia. Because there were few Jewish Bolsheviks before 1917 (with a few prominent exceptions like Zinoviev and Kamenev), the Yevsekstia's leaders in the 1920s were largely former Bundists, who pursued as Bolsheviks their campaign for secular Jewish education and culture. Although for example only a bit over 40 percent of Minsk's population was Jewish at the time, 19 of its 25 Communist Party cell secretaries were Jewish in 1924. Jewish predominance in the party cells was such that several cell meetings were held in Yiddish. Yiddish was spoken at citywide party meetings in Minsk into the late 1930s.

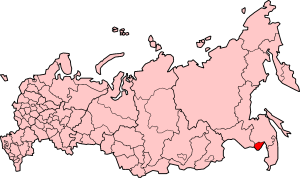
Jewish Autonomous Oblast on the map of Russia

To offset the growing Jewish national and religious aspirations of Zionism and to successfully categorize Soviet Jews under Stalin's definition of nationality, an alternative to the Land of Israel was established with the help of Komzet and OZET in 1928. The Jewish Autonomous Oblast with its center in Birobidzhan in the Russian Far East was to become a "Soviet Zion". Despite a massive domestic and international state propaganda campaign, however, the Jewish population in the Jewish Autonomous Oblast never reached 30% (in 2003 it was only about 1.2%). The experiment ground to a halt in the mid-1930s, during Stalin's first campaign of purges.

The CPSU's Yiddish-language Yevsekstia was dissolved in 1930, as part of the regime's overall turn away from encouraging minority languages and cultures and towards Russification. Many Jewish leaders, especially those with Bundist backgrounds, were arrested and executed in the purges later in the 1930s, and Yiddish schools were shut down. The Belasusian SSR shut down its entire network of Yiddish-language schools in 1938.

In his January 12, 1931, letter "Antisemitism: Reply to an Inquiry of the Jewish News Agency in the United States" (published domestically by Pravda in 1936), Stalin officially condemned antisemitism:

In answer to your inquiry: National and racial chauvinism is a vestige of the misanthropic customs characteristic of the period of cannibalism. Antisemitism, as an extreme form of racial chauvinism, is the most dangerous vestige of cannibalism.

Antisemitism is of advantage to the exploiters as a lightning conductor that deflects the blows aimed by the working people at capitalism. Antisemitism is dangerous for the working people as being a false path that leads them off the right road and lands them in the jungle. Hence Communists, as consistent internationalists, cannot but be irreconcilable, sworn enemies of antisemitism.

In the U.S.S.R. antisemitism is punishable with the utmost severity of the law as a phenomenon deeply hostile to the Soviet system. Under U.S.S.R. law active antisemites are liable to the death penalty.

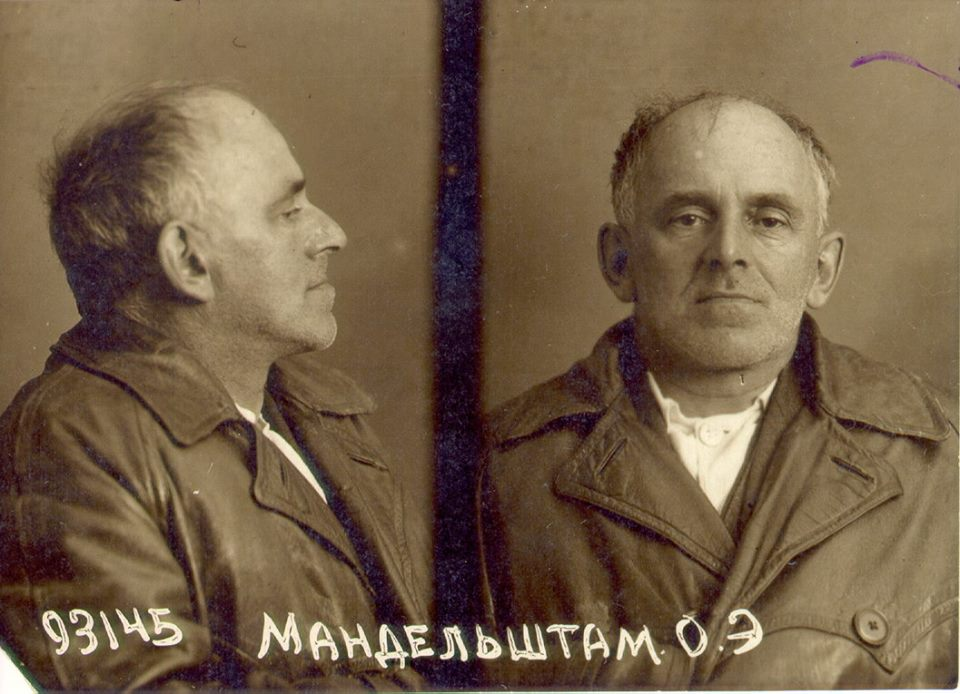
1938 NKVD arrest photo of the poet Osip Mandelstam, who died in a Gulag.

The Molotov–Ribbentrop pact—the 1939 non-aggression pact with Nazi Germany—created further suspicion regarding the Soviet Union's position toward Jews. According to the pact, Poland, the nation with the world's largest Jewish population, was divided between Germany and the Soviet Union in September 1939. While the pact had no basis in ideological sympathy (as evidenced by Nazi propaganda about "Jewish Bolshevism"), Germany's occupation of Western Poland was a disaster for Eastern European Jews. Evidence suggests that some, at least, of the Jews in the eastern Soviet zone of occupation welcomed the Russians as having a more liberated policy towards their civil rights than the preceding antisemitic Polish regime. Jews in areas annexed by the Soviet Union were deported eastward in great waves; as these areas would soon be invaded by Nazi Germany, this forced migration, deplored by many of its victims, paradoxically also saved the lives of several hundred thousand Jewish deportees.

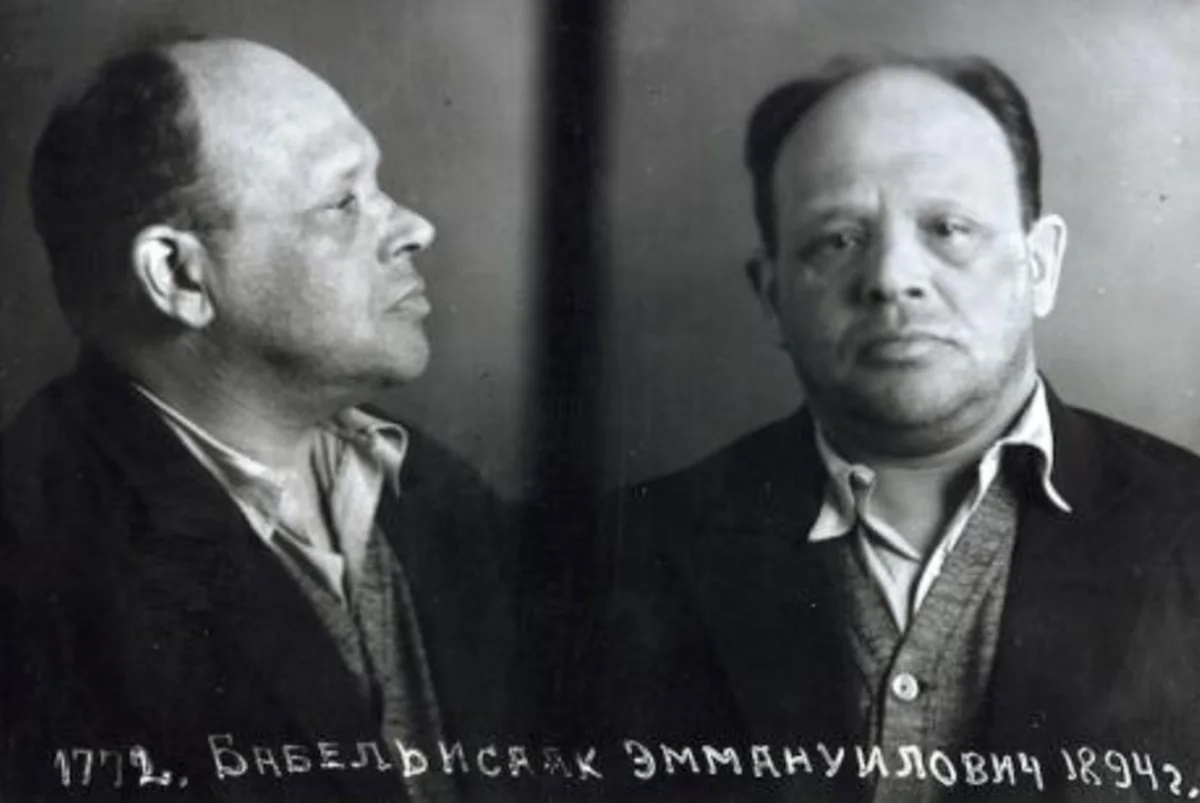
The NKVD photo of writer Isaac Babel made after his arrest during Stalin's Great Purge.

Jews who escaped the purges include Lazar Kaganovich, who came to Stalin's attention in the 1920s as a successful bureaucrat in Tashkent and participated in the purges of the 1930s. Kaganovich's loyalty endured even after Stalin's death, when he and Molotov were expelled from the party ranks in 1957 due to their opposition to destalinization.

Beyond longstanding controversies, ranging from the Molotov–Ribbentrop Pact to anti-Zionism, the Soviet Union did grant official "equality of all citizens regardless of status, sex, race, religion, and nationality". The years before the Holocaust were an era of rapid change for Soviet Jews, leaving behind the dreadful poverty of the Pale of Settlement. Forty percent of the population in the former Pale left for large cities within the USSR.

Emphasis on education and movement from countryside shtetls to newly industrialized cities allowed many Soviet Jews to enjoy overall advances under Stalin and to become one of the most educated population groups in the world.

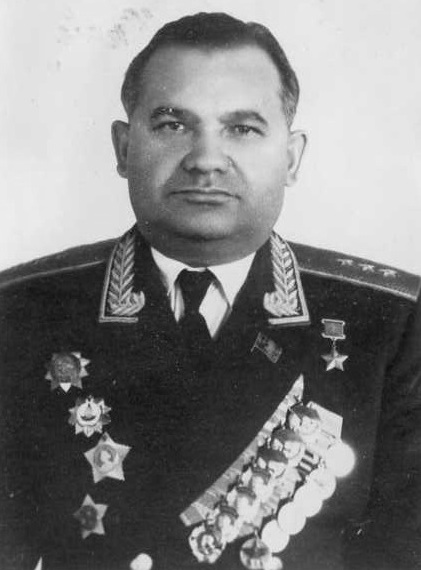
Yakov Kreizer, field commander of the Red Army.

Because of Stalinist emphasis on its urban population, interwar migration inadvertently rescued countless Soviet Jews; Nazi Germany penetrated the entire former Jewish Pale—but were kilometers short of Leningrad and Moscow. The migration of many Jews farther East from the Jewish Pale, which would become occupied by Nazi Germany, saved at least 40 percent of the Pale's original Jewish population.

By 1941, it was estimated that the Soviet Union was home to 4.855 million Jews, around 30% of all Jews worldwide. However, the majority of these were residents of rural western Belarus and Ukraine—populations that suffered greatly due to the German occupation and the Holocaust. Only around 800,000 Jews lived outside the occupied territory, and 1,200,000 to 1,400,000 Jews were eventually evacuated eastwards. Of the three million left in occupied areas, the vast majority is thought to have perished in German extermination camps.

==== World War II and the Holocaust ====
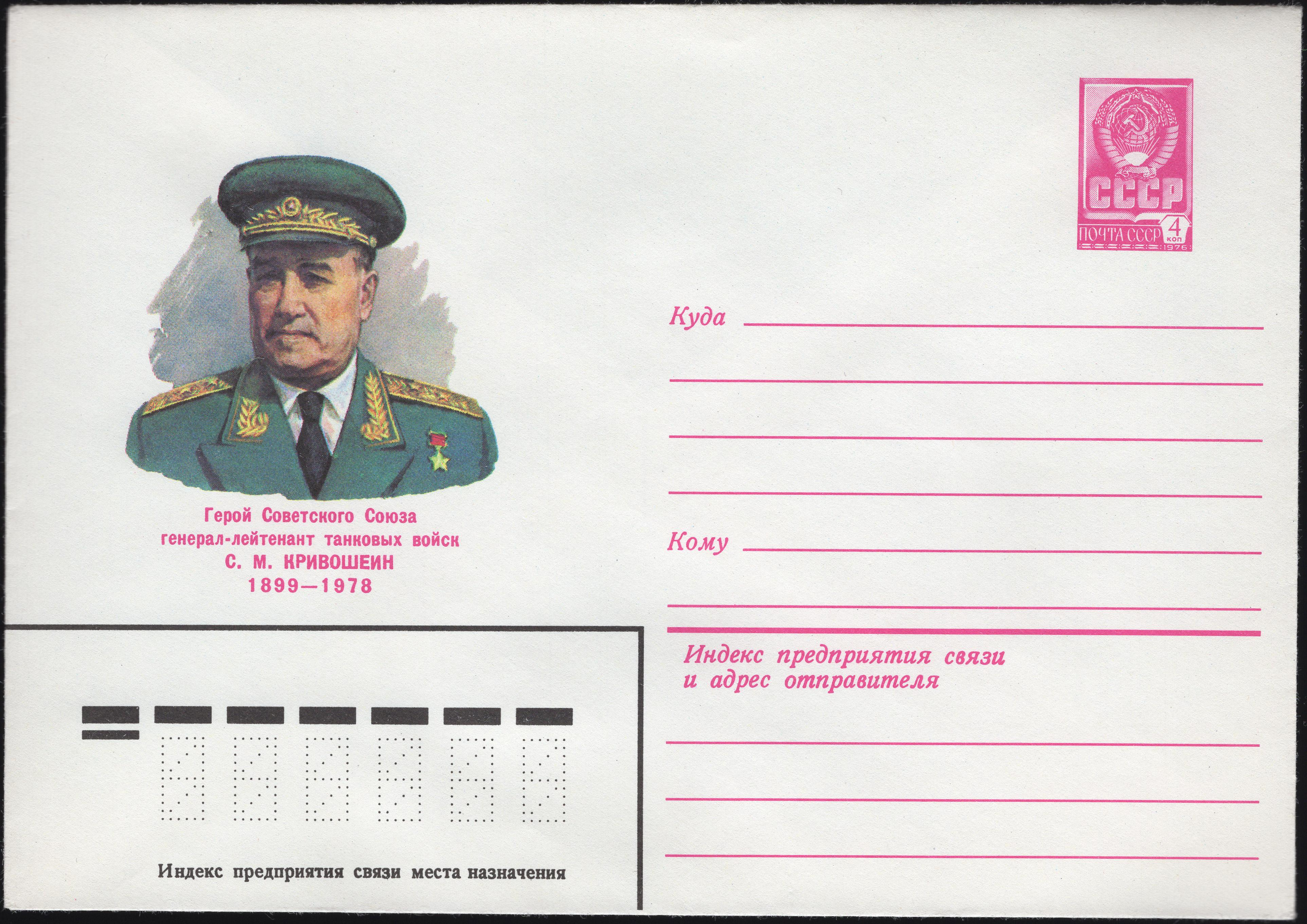
Lieutenant General Semyon Krivoshein, one of the Red Army's most influential tank commanders.

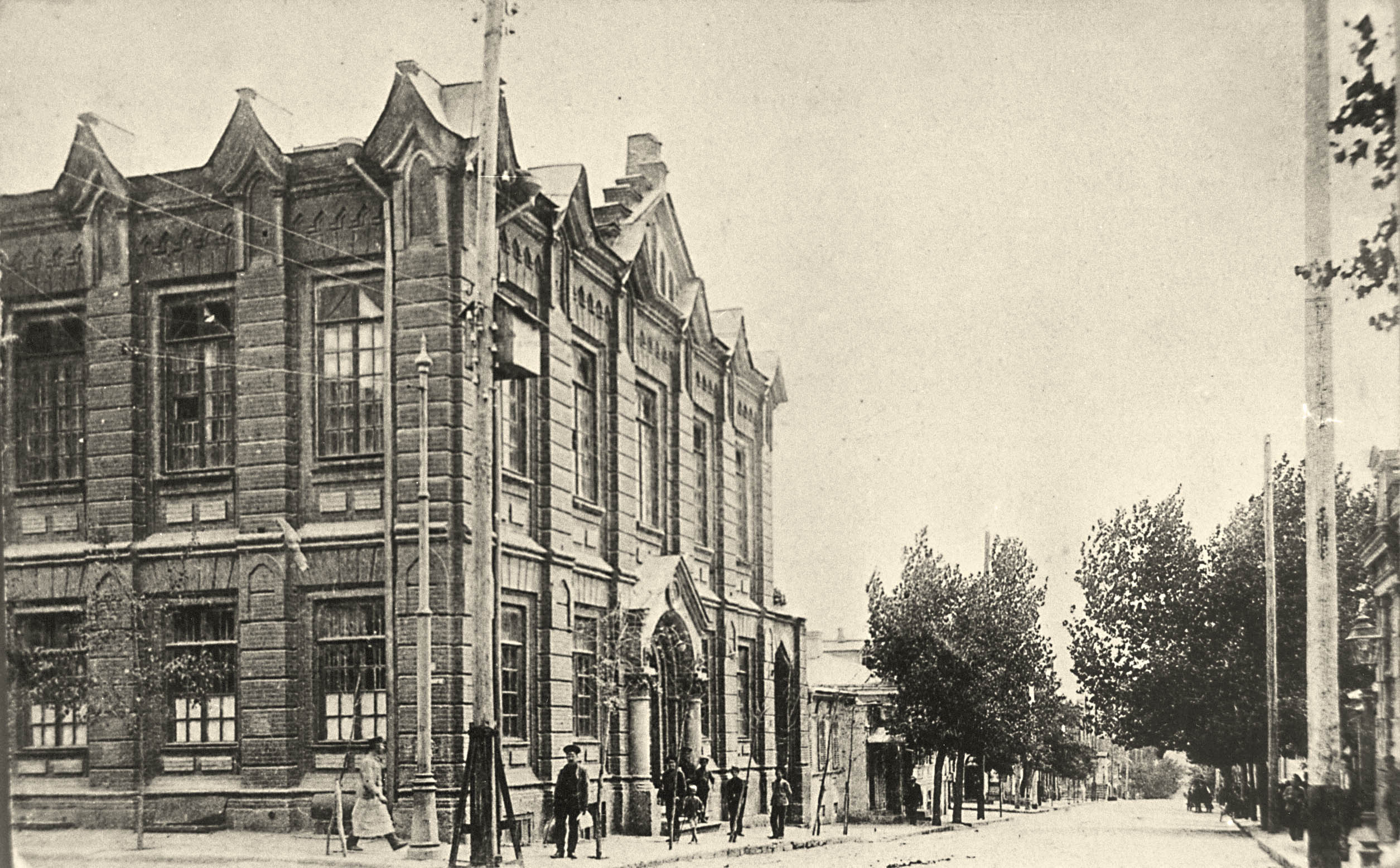
Artisans' Synagogue, in Rostov-on-Don. Burned down in 1942, during the Great Patriotic War

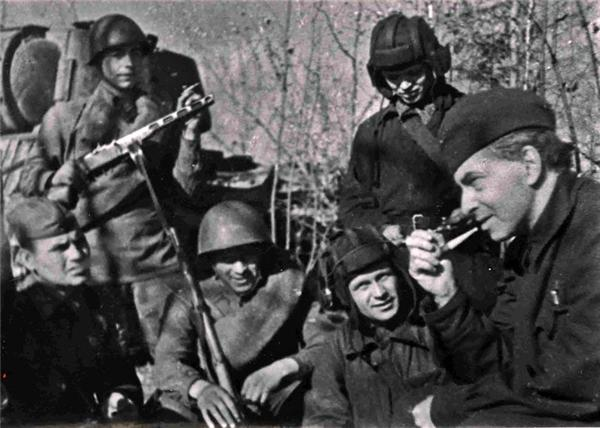
Soviet writer and journalist Ilya Ehrenburg with Soviet soldiers in 1942

Over two million Soviet Jews are believed to have died during the Holocaust, second only to the number of Polish Jews who fell victim to Hitler (see The Holocaust in Poland). Among some of the larger massacres which were committed in 1941 were: 33,771 Jews of Kiev shot in ditches at Babi Yar; 100,000 Jews and Poles of Vilnius killed in the forests of Ponary, 20,000 Jews killed in Kharkiv at Drobnitzky Yar, 36,000 Jews machine-gunned in Odessa, 25,000 Jews of Riga killed in the woods at Rumbula, and 10,000 Jews slaughtered in Simferopol in the Crimea. Although mass shootings continued through 1942, most notably 16,000 Jews shot at Pinsk, Jews were increasingly shipped to concentration camps in German Nazi-occupied Poland.

Local residents of German-occupied areas, especially Ukrainians, Lithuanians, and Latvians, sometimes played key roles in the genocide of other Latvians, Lithuanians, Ukrainians, Slavs, Romani, homosexuals and Jews alike. Under the Nazi occupation, some members of the Ukrainian and Latvian Nazi police carried out deportations in the Warsaw Ghetto, and Lithuanians marched Jews to their death at Ponary. Even as some assisted the Germans, a significant number of individuals in the territories under German control also helped Jews escape death (see Righteous Among the Nations). In Latvia, particularly, the number of Nazi-collaborators was only slightly more than that of Jewish saviours. It is estimated that up to 1.4 million Jews fought in Allied armies; 40% of them in the Red Army. In total, at least 142,500 Soviet soldiers of Jewish nationality lost their lives fighting against the German invaders and their allies

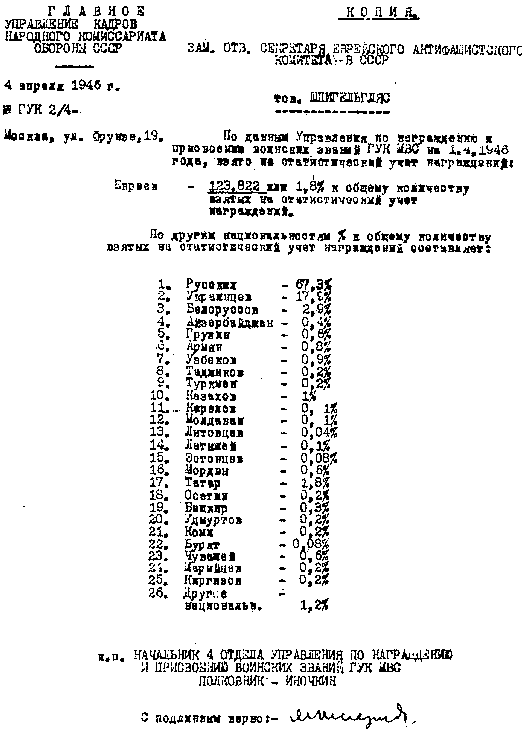
1946. The official response to an inquiry by JAC about the military decorations of Jews during the war (1.8% of the total number). Some antisemites attempted to accuse Jews of lack of patriotism and of hiding from military service.

The typical Soviet policy regarding the Holocaust was to present it as atrocities against Soviet citizens, not emphasizing the genocide of the Jews. For example, after the liberation of Kiev from the Nazi occupation, the Extraordinary State Commission (Чрезвычайная Государственная Комиссия; Chrezv'chaynaya Gosudarstvennaya Komissiya) was set out to investigate Nazi crimes. The description of the Babi Yar massacre was officially censored as follows:

| Draft report (December 25, 1943) | Censored version (February 1944) |
|---|---|
| "The Hitlerist bandits committed brutal mass extermination of the Jewish population. They announced that on September 29, 1941, all Jews were required to arrive to the corner of Melnikov and Dokterev streets and bring their documents, money and valuables. The butchers herded them to Babi Yar, took away their valuables, then shot them." | "The Hitlerist bandits herded thousands of Soviet citizens to the corner of Melnikov and Dokterev streets. The butchers marched them to Babi Yar, took away their valuables, then shot them." |

==== Stalinist antisemitic campaigns ====
The revival of Jewish identity after the war, stimulated by the creation of the state of Israel in 1948, was cautiously welcomed by Stalin as a means to put pressure on Western imperialism in the Middle East, but when it became evident that many Soviet Jews expected the revival of Zionism to enhance their own aspirations for separate cultural and religious development in the Soviet Union, a wave of repression was unleashed.

In January 1948 Solomon Mikhoels, a popular actor-director of the Moscow State Jewish Theater and the chairman of the Jewish Anti-Fascist Committee, was killed in a suspicious car accident. Mass arrests of prominent Jewish intellectuals and suppression of Jewish culture followed under the banners of campaign against "rootless cosmopolitans" and anti-Zionism. On August 12, 1952, in the event known as the Night of the Murdered Poets, thirteen of the most prominent Yiddish writers, poets, actors and other intellectuals were executed on the orders of Joseph Stalin, among them Peretz Markish, Leib Kvitko, David Hofstein, Itzik Feffer and David Bergelson. In the 1955 United Nations General Assembly's session a high Soviet official still denied the "rumors" about their disappearance.

The Doctors' Plot allegation in 1953 was a deliberately antisemitic policy: Stalin targeted "corrupt Jewish bourgeois nationalists", eschewing the usual code words like "rootless cosmopolitans" or "cosmopolitans". Stalin died, however, before this next wave of arrests and executions could be launched in earnest. A number of historians claim that the Doctors' Plot was intended as the opening of a campaign that would have resulted in the mass deportation of Soviet Jews had Stalin not died on March 5, 1953. Days after Stalin's death the plot was declared a hoax by the Soviet government.

These cases may have reflected Stalin's paranoia, rather than state ideology—a distinction that made no practical difference as long as Stalin was alive, but which became salient on his death.

In April 1956, the Warsaw Yiddish language Jewish newspaper Folkshtimme published sensational long lists of Soviet Jews who had perished before and after the Holocaust. The world press began demanding answers from Soviet leaders, as well as inquiring about the current condition of the Jewish education system and culture. The same autumn, a group of leading Jewish world figures publicly requested the heads of Soviet state to clarify the situation. Since no cohesive answer was received, their concern was only heightened. The fate of Soviet Jews emerged as a major human rights issue in the West.

==== The Soviet Union and Zionism ====
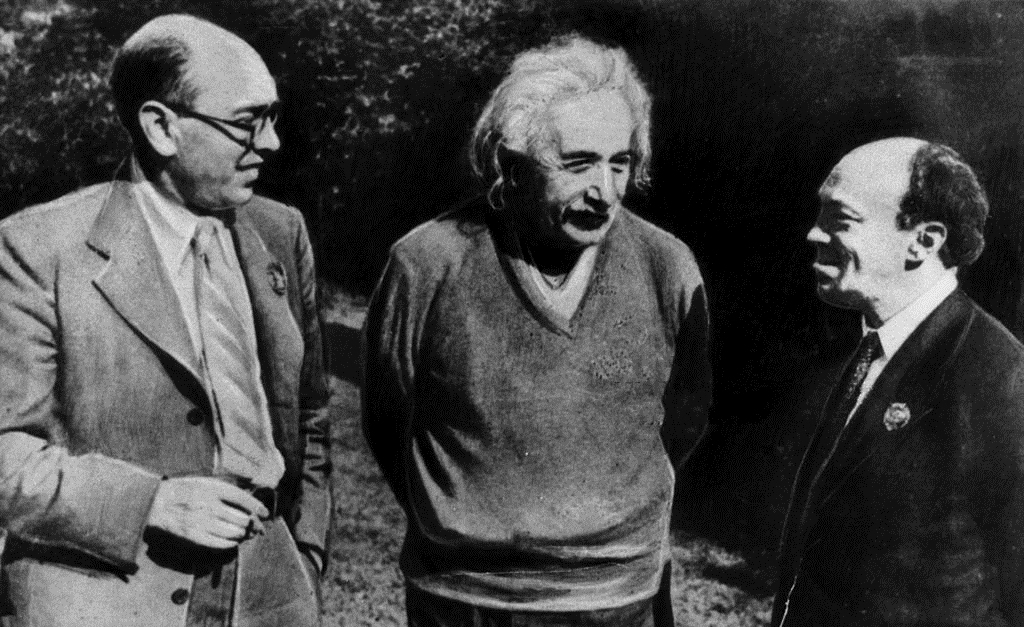
Itzik Feffer (left), Albert Einstein and Solomon Mikhoels in the United States in 1943. Feffer was executed on the Night of the Murdered Poets and rehabilitated posthumously in 1955, after Stalin's death.

Marxist anti-nationalism and anti-clericalism had a mixed effect on Soviet Jews. Jews were the immediate benefactors, but they were also long-term victims, of the Marxist notion that any manifestation of nationalism is "socially retrogressive". On one hand, Jews were liberated from the religious persecution of the Tsarist years of "Orthodoxy, Autocracy, and Nationality". On the other, this notion was threatening to Jewish cultural institutions, the Bund, Jewish autonomy, Judaism and Zionism.

Political Zionism was officially stamped out as a form of bourgeois nationalism during the entire history of the Soviet Union. Although Leninism emphasizes the belief in "self-determination", this fact did not make the Soviet state more accepting of Zionism. Leninism defines self-determination by territory or culture, rather than by religion, which allowed Soviet minorities to have separate oblasts, autonomous regions, or republics, which were nonetheless symbolic until its later years. Jews, however, did not fit such a theoretical model; Jews in the Diaspora did not even have an agricultural base, as Stalin often asserted when he attempted to deny the existence of a Jewish nation, and they certainly did not have a territorial unit. Marxist notions even denied the existence of a Jewish identity beyond the existence of a religion and caste; Marx defined Jews as a "chimerical nation".

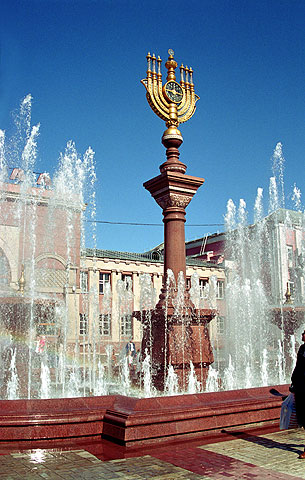
A giant menorah dominating the main square in Birobidzhan, in the Jewish Autonomous Oblast, founded in the Russian Far East in 1936

Lenin, who claimed to be deeply committed to egalitarian ideals and the universality of all humanity, rejected Zionism as a reactionary movement, "bourgeois nationalism", "socially retrogressive", and a backward force that deprecates class divisions among Jews. Moreover, Zionism entailed contact between Soviet citizens and westerners, which was dangerous in a closed society. Soviet authorities were likewise fearful of any mass-movement which was independent of the monopolistic Communist Party, and not tied to the state or the ideology of Marxism-Leninism.

Without changing his official anti-Zionist stance, from late 1944 until 1948 Joseph Stalin adopted a de facto pro-Zionist foreign policy, apparently believing that the new country would be socialist and hasten the decline of British influence in the Middle East.

In a May 14, 1947 speech during the UN Partition Plan debate, published in Izvestiya two days later, the Soviet ambassador Andrei Gromyko announced:

As we know, the aspirations of a considerable part of the Jewish people are linked with the problem of Palestine and of its future administration. This fact scarcely requires proof... During the last war, the Jewish people underwent exceptional sorrow and suffering...

The United Nations cannot and must not regard this situation with indifference, since this would be incompatible with the high principles proclaimed in its Charter...

The fact that no Western European State has been able to ensure the defence of the elementary rights of the Jewish people and to safeguard it against the violence of the fascist executioners explains the aspirations of the Jews to establish their own State. It would be unjust not to take this into consideration and to deny the right of the Jewish people to realize this aspiration.

Soviet approval in the United Nations Security Council was critical to the UN partitioning of the British Mandate of Palestine, which led to the founding of the State of Israel. Three days after Israel declared its independence, the Soviet Union legally recognized it de jure. In addition, the USSR allowed Czechoslovakia to continue supplying arms to the Jewish forces during the 1948 Arab–Israeli War, even though this conflict took place after the Soviet-supported Czechoslovak coup d'état of 1948. At the time, the U.S. maintained an arms embargo on both sides in the conflict. See Arms shipments from Czechoslovakia to Israel 1947–1949.

By the end of 1957 the USSR switched sides in the Arab–Israeli conflict and throughout the course of the Cold War unequivocally supported various Arab regimes against Israel. The official position of the Soviet Union and its satellite states and agencies was that Zionism was a tool used by the Jews and Americans for "racist imperialism".

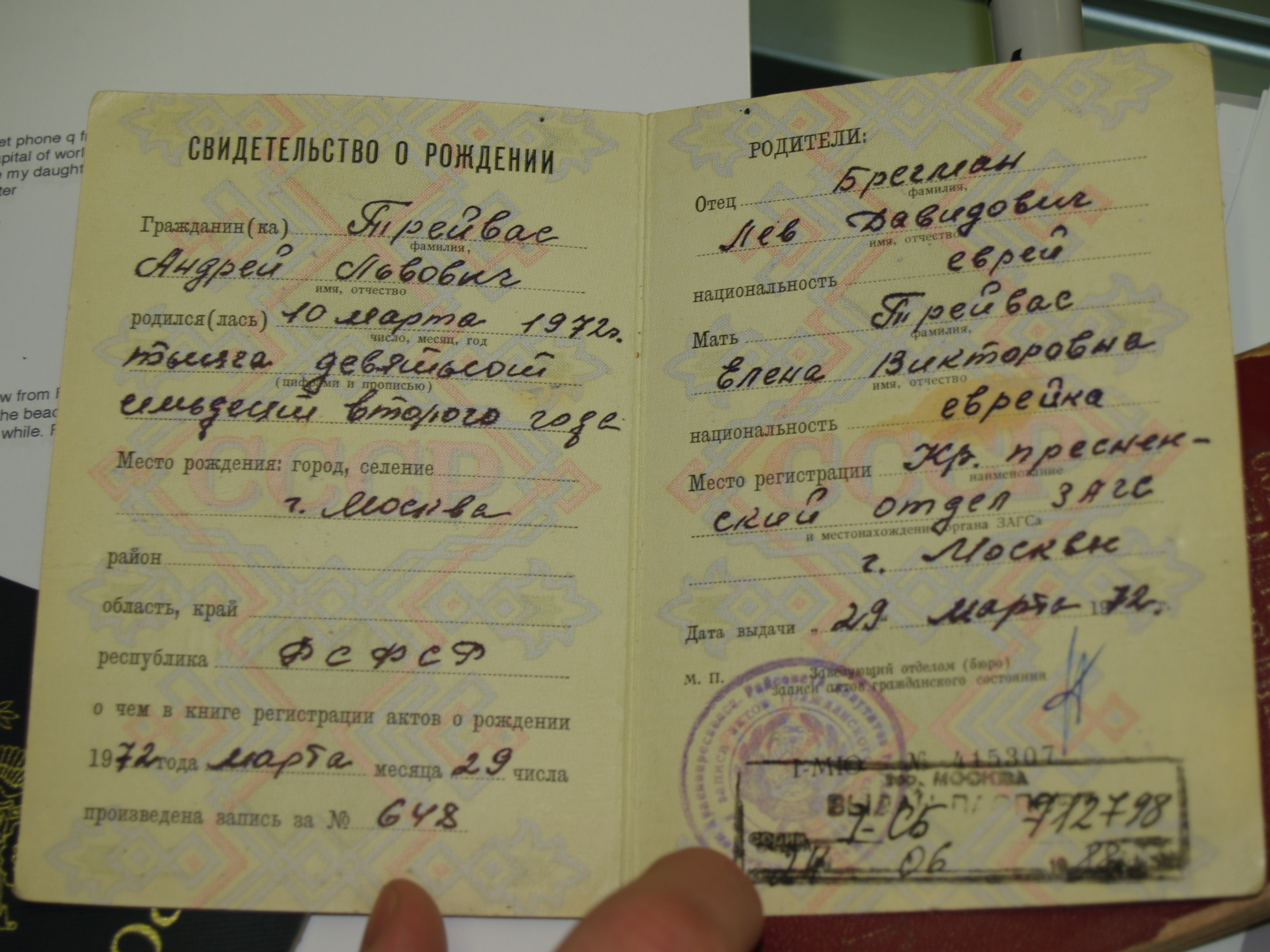
A Soviet birth certificate from 1972 indicating the person's parents' ethnicity as "Jew".

As Israel was emerging as a close Western ally, the specter of Zionism raised fears of internal dissent and opposition. During the later parts of the Cold War, Soviet Jews were suspected of being possible traitors, Western sympathisers, or a security liability. The Communist leadership closed down various Jewish organizations and declared Zionism an ideological enemy. Synagogues were often placed under police surveillance, both openly and through the use of informers.

As a result of the persecution, both state-sponsored and unofficial, antisemitism was ingrained in the society and remained for years: ordinary Soviet Jews often suffered hardships, epitomized by often not being allowed to enlist in universities, work in certain professions, or participate in government. However, it should be mentioned that this was not always the case and this kind of persecution varied depending on the region. Still many Jews felt compelled to hide their identities by changing their names.

The word "Jew" was also avoided in the media when criticising undertakings by Israel, which the Soviets often accused of racism, chauvinism etc. Instead of Jew, the word Israeli was used almost exclusively, so as to paint its harsh criticism not as antisemitism but anti-Zionism. More controversially, the Soviet media, when depicting political events, sometimes used the term 'fascism' to characterise Israeli nationalism (e.g. calling Jabotinsky a 'fascist', and claiming 'new fascist organisations were emerging in Israel in the 1970s' etc.).

==== 1967–1985 ====
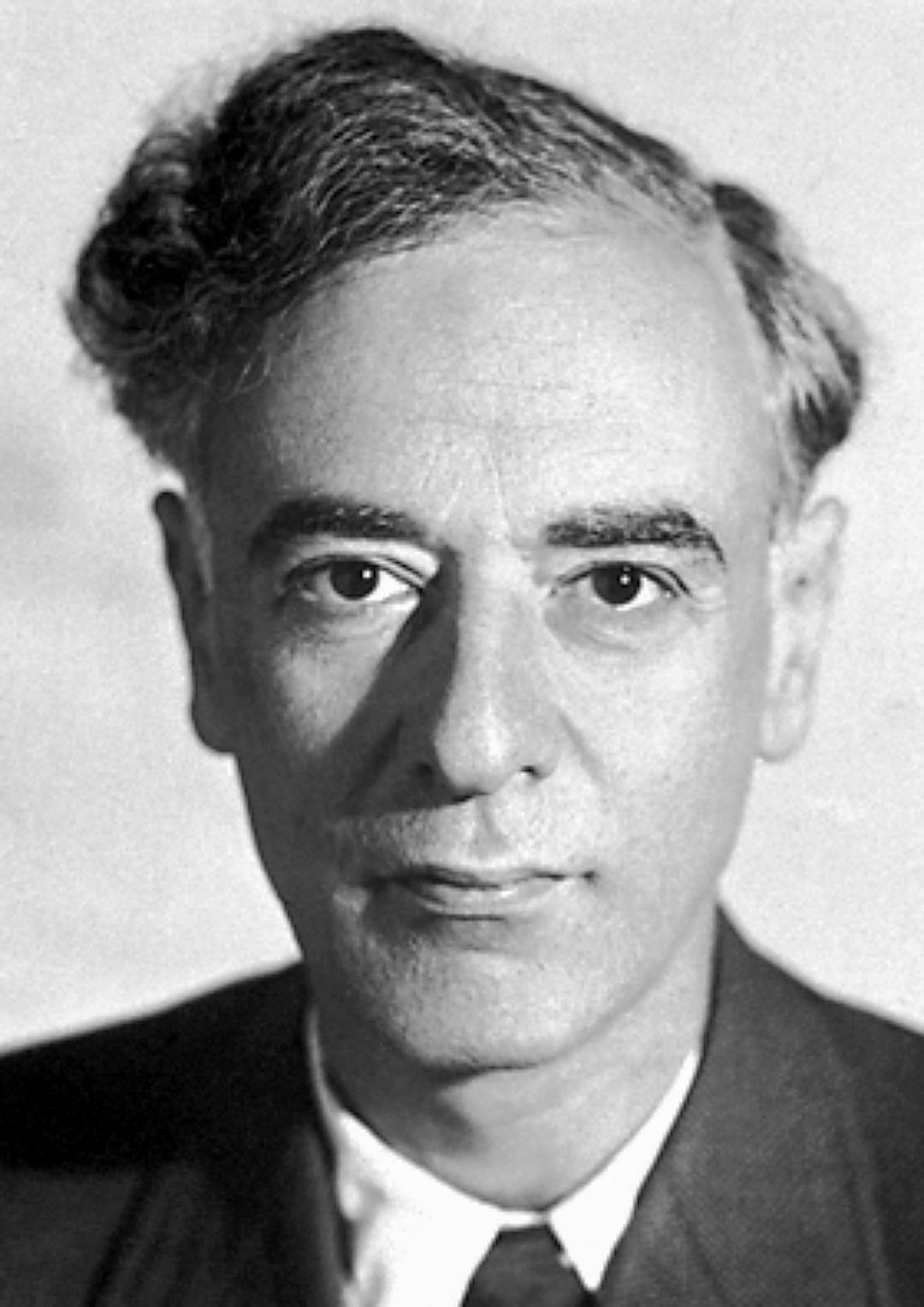
In a 1965 letter in the New York Times Nobel Physics laureate Lev Landau (above) and Evsei Liberman said that as Soviet Jews they opposed the Student Struggle for Soviet Jewry.

According to the census of 1959 the Jewish population of the city of Leningrad numbered 169,000 and the Great Choral synagogue was open in the 1960s with some 1,200 seats. The rabbi was Avraham Lubanov. This synagogue has never been closed. The great majority of the Leningrad Jews were not religious, but several thousand used to visit the synagogue on great holidays, mostly on Simchat Torah.

A mass emigration was politically undesirable for the Soviet regime. As increasing numbers of Soviet Jews applied to emigrate to Israel in the period following the 1967 Six-Day War, many were formally refused permission to leave. A typical excuse given by the OVIR (ОВиР), the MVD department responsible for the provisioning of exit visas, was that persons who had been given access at some point in their careers to information vital to Soviet national security could not be allowed to leave the country.

After the Dymshits–Kuznetsov hijacking affair in 1970 and the crackdown that followed, strong international condemnations caused the Soviet authorities to increase the emigration quota. From 1960 to 1970, only 4,000 people left the USSR; in the following decade, the number rose to 250,000.

In 1972, the USSR imposed the so-called "diploma tax" on would-be emigrants who received higher education in the USSR. In some cases, the fee was as high as twenty annual salaries. This measure was possibly designed to combat the brain drain caused by the growing emigration of Soviet Jews and other members of the intelligentsia to the West. Although Jews now made up less than 1% of the population, some surveys have suggested that around one-third of the emigrating Jews had achieved some form of higher education. Furthermore, Jews holding positions requiring specialized training tended to be highly concentrated in a small set of specialties, including medicine, mathematics, biology and music. Following international protests, the Kremlin soon revoked the tax, but continued to sporadically impose various limitations. Besides, an unofficial Jewish quota was introduced in the leading institutions of higher education by subjecting Jewish applicants to harsher entrance examinations.

At first almost all of those who managed to get exit visas to Israel actually made aliyah, but after the mid-1970s, most of those allowed to leave for Israel actually chose other destinations, most notably the United States.

==== Glasnost and end of the USSR ====
In the 1980s, the liberal government of Mikhail Gorbachev allowed unlimited Jewish emigration, and the Soviet Union itself collapsed in 1991. As a result, a mass emigration of Jews from the former Soviet Union took place.

From the 1970s, over 1.1 million Russians of Jewish origin immigrated to Israel, of whom 100,000 emigrated to third countries such as the United States and Canada soon afterward and 240,000 were not considered Jewish under Halakha, but were eligible under the Law of Return due to Jewish ancestry or marriage. In 1989 a record 71,000 Soviet Jews were granted exodus from the USSR, of whom only 12,117 immigrated to Israel.

At first, American policy treated Soviet Jews as refugees and allowed unlimited numbers to immigrate. Since the adoption of the Jackson–Vanik amendment in 1974, over 600,000 Soviet Jews have emigrated. The US policy eventually came to an end; as a result, more Jews began moving to Israel, as it was the only country willing to take them unconditionally.

=== Modern-day Russia ===
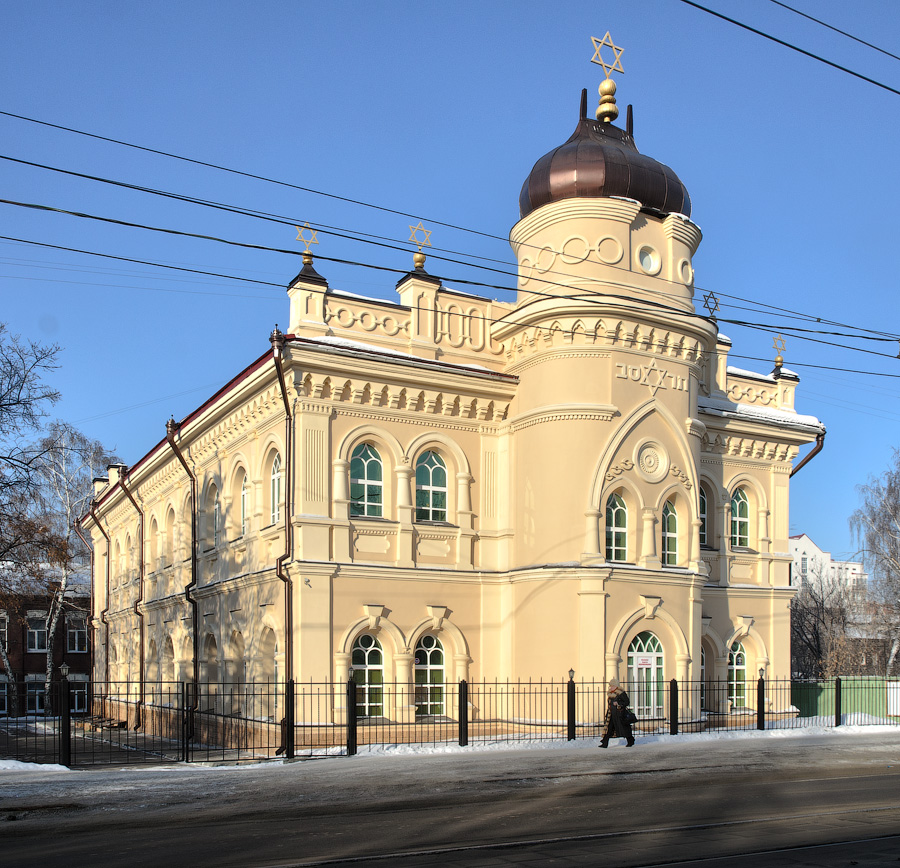
Tomsk Choral Synagogue, the oldest synagogue in Siberia

Judaism today is officially designated as one of Russia's four "traditional religions", alongside Orthodox Christianity, Islam and Buddhism. However, the Jewish community continues to decline, from 232,267 in the 2002 census to 83,896 in 2021, not counting 500 Crimean Karaites, of which 28,119 lived in Moscow and 5,111 lived in the surrounding Moscow Oblast for a total of 33,230, or 39.61% of the entire Russian Jewish population. A further 9,215 lived in Saint-Petersburg with 851 in the surrounding Leningrad Oblast for a total of 10,066, or 12.00% of the entire Russian Jewish population; thus, Russia's two largest cities and surrounding areas hosted 51.61% of the total Russian Jewish population.

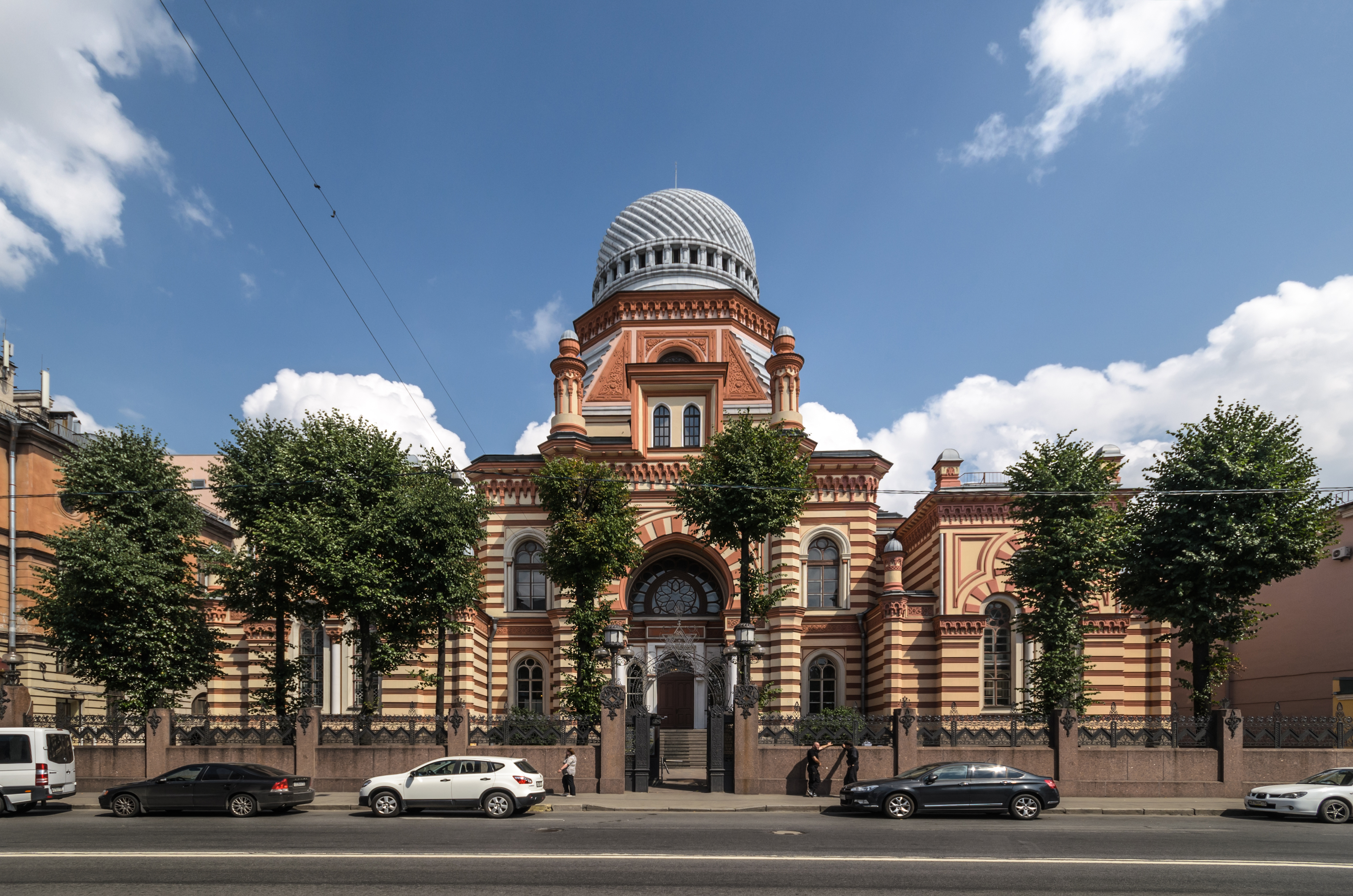
The Grand Choral Synagogue of Saint Petersburg, among the largest synagogues in Europe and the world.

The third most populous community was Crimea, which had a population of 2,522 (of which 864 Krymchaks) in the Autonomous Republic in addition to 517 (including 35 Krymchaks) in Sevastopol, for a total of 3,039 (of which 29.58% Krymchaks), not counting 215 Crimean Karaites. This amounts to 3.62% of the total Russian Jewish population.

After Crimea, the most numerically significant populations were Sverdlovsk with 2,354 (2.81%) and Samara, with 2,266 (2.70%), followed by Tatarstan with 1,792 (2.14%), Rostov Oblast with 1,690 (2.01%), Chelyabinsk with 1,677 (2.00%), Krasnodar Krai with 1,620 (1.93%), Stavropol with 1,614 (1.92%), Nizhny Novgorod with 1,473 (1.76%), Bashkortostan with 1,209 (1.44%), Saratov with 1,151 (1.37%) and Novosibirsk with 1,150 (1.37%). The remaining 20,565 (24.52%) of Russian Jews lived in regions with communities numbering fewer than 1,000 Jews.

Despite being designated as a Jewish oblast, the Jewish Autonomous Oblast has only 837 self-identifying Jews, or 0.56% of the total population of the Autonomous Oblast. This is down 64.03% from the 2,327 recorded in the 2002 census, or 1.22% of the Oblast's population at the time.

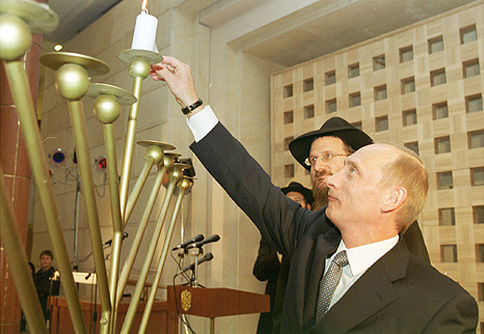
President Putin lighting a Hannukah Menorah with Russia's Chief Rabbi Berel Lazar. Judaism is officially designated as one of Russia's four state-religions.

As of the 2021 census, most Russian Jews are Ashkenazi (82,644 of the 83,896 total, or 98.51%). The second largest community are the Krymchaks, who numbered 954, or 1.14% of the Jewish population. There were 266 Mountain Jews (0.32%) and some Bukharan and Georgian Jews, who numbered 18 (0.02%) and 14 (0.02%) respectively. In addition to this, there were 500 Crimean Karaites, who have historically not identified as Jews.

Most Crimean Karaites lived in Crimea (215, or 43.00%) or Moscow (60); most Krymchaks lived in Crimea (864, or 90.57% of the total) or Sebastopol (35, or 3.68%) meaning 899, or 94.23% of the Russian Krymchak population, still lives on the Crimean peninsula, largely rurally. The Crimean Karaite population in Crimea has declined by well over 50% since the Ukrainian census of 2001. Conversely, most Juhurim have left the Caucasus region, and the largest single community still in Russia (84, 31.58%) is found in Moscow. Of the Jewish populations remaining in the northern Caucasus, most are now Ashkenazi, with only a few being Mountain Jews. There are still 145 Mountain Jews scattered throughout the northern Caucasus, of which 60 are in Dagestan (amounting to 6.49% of the republic's Jewish population), 47 are in Kabardino-Balkaria (6.02%), 29 are in Stavropol (1.80%), 6 are in Krasnodar (0.37%) and 3 are in Adygea (2.24%). There are no Mountain Jews remaining in Chechnya, Ingushetia, North Ossetia-Alania or Karachay-Cherkessia.

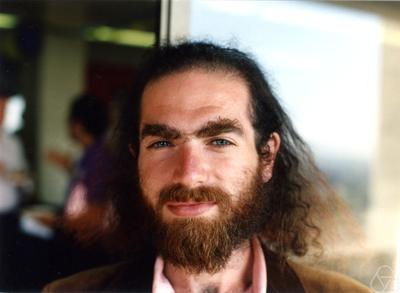
Saint-Petersburg Mathematician Grigory Perelman

Most Russian Jews are secular and identify themselves as Jews via ethnicity rather than religion, although interest about Jewish identity as well as practice of Jewish tradition amongst Russian Jews is growing. The Lubavitcher Jewish Movement has been active in this sector, setting up synagogues and Jewish kindergartens in Russian cities with Jewish populations. In addition, most Russian Jews have relatives who live in Israel.

There are several major Jewish organizations in the territories of the former USSR. The central Jewish organization is the Federation of Jewish Communities of the CIS under the leadership of Chief Rabbi Berel Lazar.

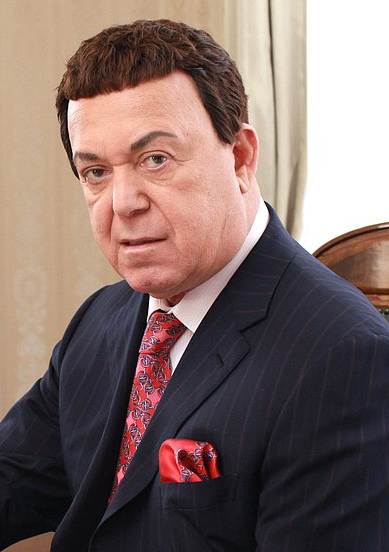
Joseph Kobzon, Russia's most decorated artist, was often described as the 'Russian Sinatra'

A linguistic distinction remains to this day in the Russian language where there are two distinct terms that correspond to the word Jew in English. The word еврей ("yevrey" – Hebrew) typically denotes a Jewish ethnicity, as "Hebrew" did in English up until the early 20th century. The word иудей ("iudey" – Judean, etymologically related to the English Jew) is reserved for denoting a follower of the Jewish religion, whether he or she is ethnically Jewish or ethnically Gentile; this term has largely fallen out of use in favor of the equivalent term иудаист ("iudaist"-Judaist). For example, according to a 2012 Russian survey, евреи account for only 32.2% of иудаисты in Russia, with nearly half (49.8%) being Ethnic Russians (русские). An ethnic slur, жид (borrowed from the Polish Żyd, Jew), also remains in widespread use in Russia.

Antisemitism is one of the most common expressions of xenophobia in post-Soviet Russia, even among some groups of politicians, despite laws against fomenting hatred based on ethnic or religious grounds (Article 282 of Russian Federation Penal Code). In 2002, the number of antisemitic neo-Nazi groups in the republics of the former Soviet Union, led Pravda to declare in 2002 that "Anti-Semitism is booming in Russia". In January 2005, a group of 15 Duma members demanded that Judaism and Jewish organizations be banned from Russia. In 2005, 500 prominent Russians, including some 20 members of the nationalist Rodina party, demanded that the state prosecutor investigate ancient Jewish texts as "anti-Russian" and ban Judaism. An investigation was in fact launched, but halted after an international outcry.

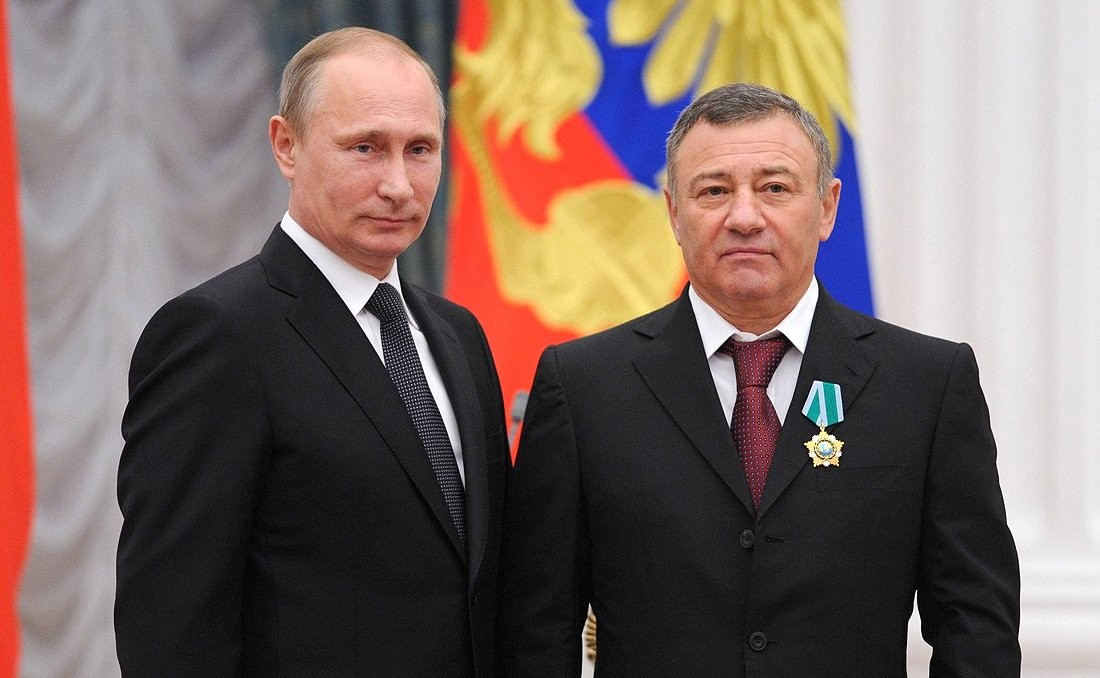
Arkady Rotenberg, a billionaire businessman and co-owner of Stroygazmontazh. He is considered a close confidant of Vladimir Putin.

Overall, in recent years, particularly since the early 2000s, levels of antisemitism in Russia have been reportedly low, and steadily decreasing. In 2019, Ilya Yablogov wrote that many Russians were keen on antisemitic conspiracy theories in 1990s but it declined after 2000 and many high-ranking officials were forced to apologize for the antisemitic behavior.

In Russia, both historical and contemporary antisemitic materials are frequently published. For example, a set (called Library of a Russian Patriot) consisting of twenty five antisemitic titles was recently published, including Mein Kampf translated to Russian (2002), which although was banned in 2010, The Myth of Holocaust by Jürgen Graf, a title by Douglas Reed, Protocols of the Elders of Zion, and others.

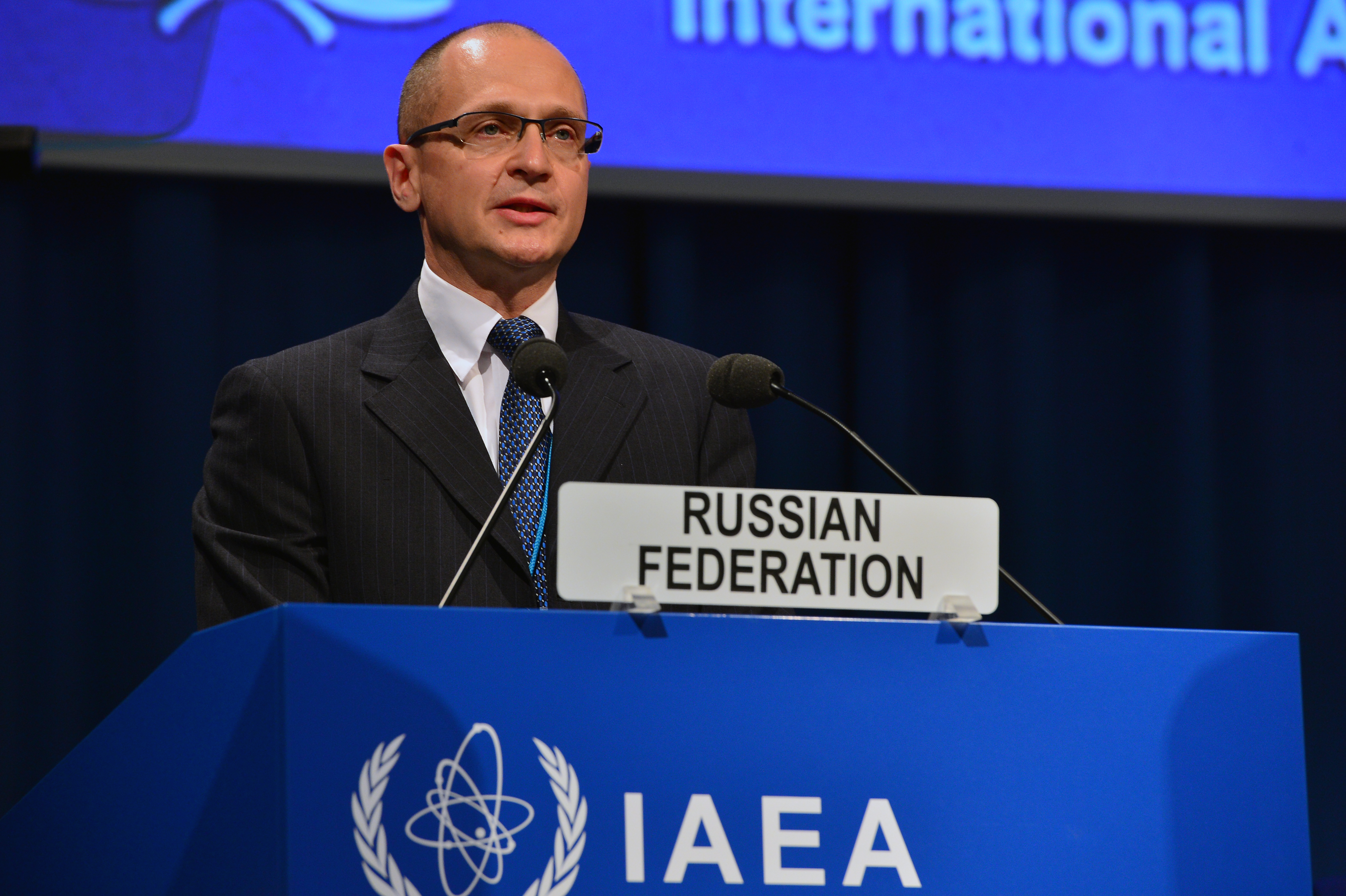
Sergey Kiriyenko, the youngest Prime Minister of Russia

Antisemitic incidents are mostly conducted by extremist, nationalist, and Islamist groups. Most of the antisemitic incidents are against Jewish cemeteries and buildings (such as community centers and synagogues) such as the assault against the Jewish community's center in Perm in March 2013 and the attack on Jewish nursery school in Volgograd in August 2013. Nevertheless, there were several violent attacks against Jews in Moscow in 2006 when a neo-Nazi stabbed 9 people at the Bolshaya Bronnaya Synagogue, the failed bomb attack on the same synagogue in 1999.

Attacks against Jews made by extremist Islamic groups are rare in Russia although there has been increase in the scope of the attacks mainly in Muslim populated areas. On July 25, 2013, the rabbi of Derbent was attacked and badly injured by an unknown person near his home, most likely by a terrorist. The incident sparked concerns among the local Jews of further acts against the Jewish community.

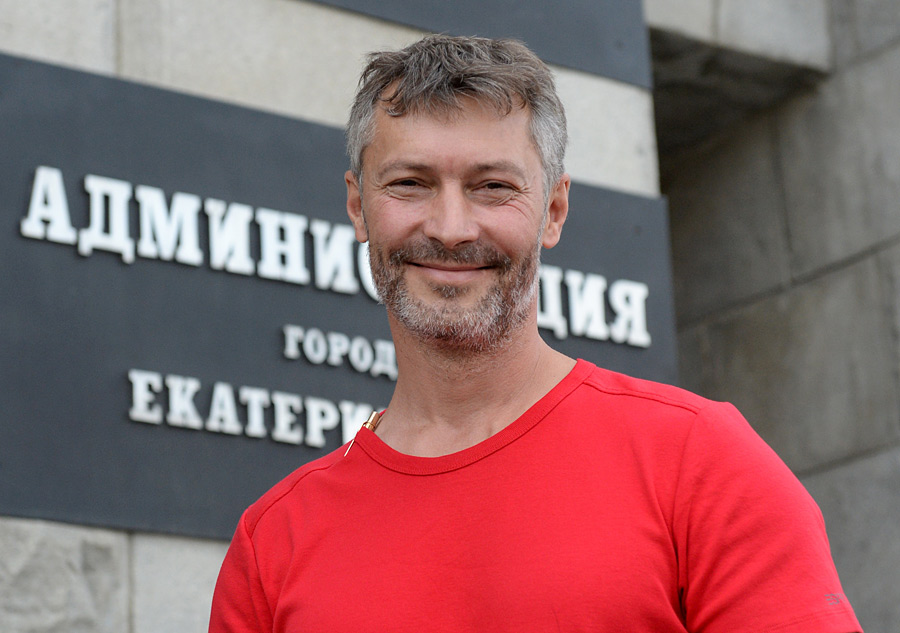
Russian opposition politician Yevgeny Roizman, who served as the Mayor of Yekaterinburg from 2013 to 2018. He was arrested in 2022 after denouncing the war in Ukraine.

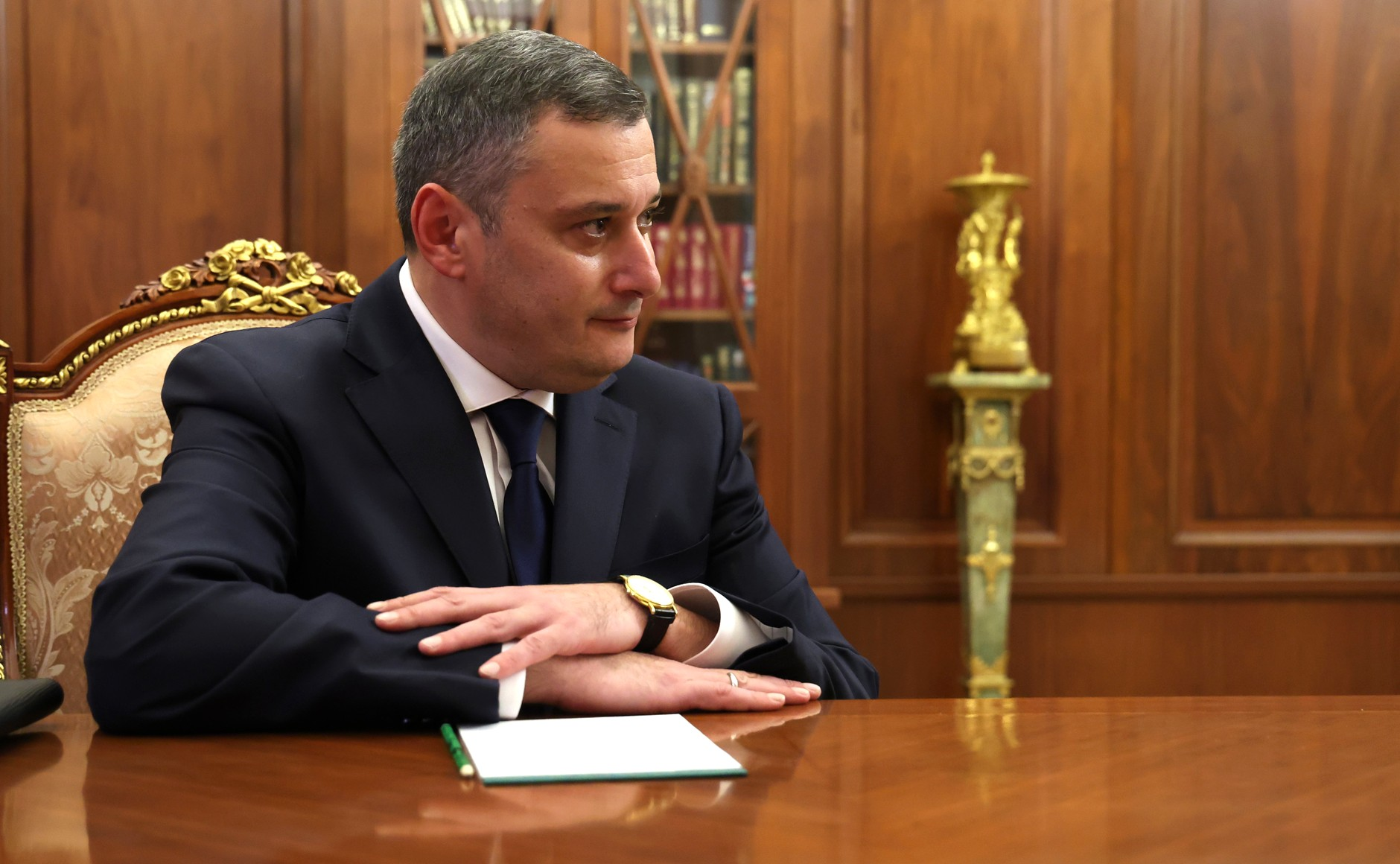
State Duma deputy Alexander Khinshtein was appointed as acting governor of Kursk Oblast in 2024

After the passage of some anti-gay laws in Russia in 2013 and the incident with the "Pussy Riot" band in 2012 causing a growing criticism on the subject inside and outside Russia a number of verbal antisemitic attacks were made against Russian gay activists by extremist activists and antisemitic writers such as Israel Shamir who viewed the "Pussy Riot" incident as the war of Judaism on the Christian Orthodox church.

The contemporary Jewish population of Russia is shrinking due to small family sizes, and high rates of assimilation and intermarriage. This shrinkage has been slowed by some Russian-Jewish emigrants having returned from abroad, especially from Germany. The great majority of up to 90% of children born to a Jewish parent are the offspring of mixed marriages, and most Jews have only one or two children.

The EuroStars young adults program provides Jewish learning and social activities in 32 cities across Russia. Some have described a 'renaissance' in the Jewish community inside Russia since the beginning of the 21st century.

The Chief Rabbi of Russia, Rabbi Berel Lazar, spoke out against the Russian invasion of Ukraine, called Russia to withdraw and for an end to the war, and offered to mediate. The Chief Rabbi of Moscow, Pinchas Goldschmidt, left Russia after he refused a request from state officials to publicly support the Russian invasion of Ukraine. On 30 June 2023, Goldschmidt was designated in Russia as a foreign agent.

The repression of opposition to the Russian invasion of Ukraine, including under Russia's war censorship laws, has also affected Russian Jews and Russians of Jewish descent. Among those who have faced prosecution, imprisonment or other forms of state repression are Lev Shlosberg, Yevgeny Roizman, Maxim Katz, Dmitry Bykov and Boris Akunin. Others, including Maxim Galkin, Leonid Gozman and Andrey Makarevich, left Russia following their opposition to the invasion and were subsequently designated as "foreign agents". These cases concerned their political views and opposition to the war rather than their Jewish background.

== Historical demographics ==
Jewish % of the population in each SSR

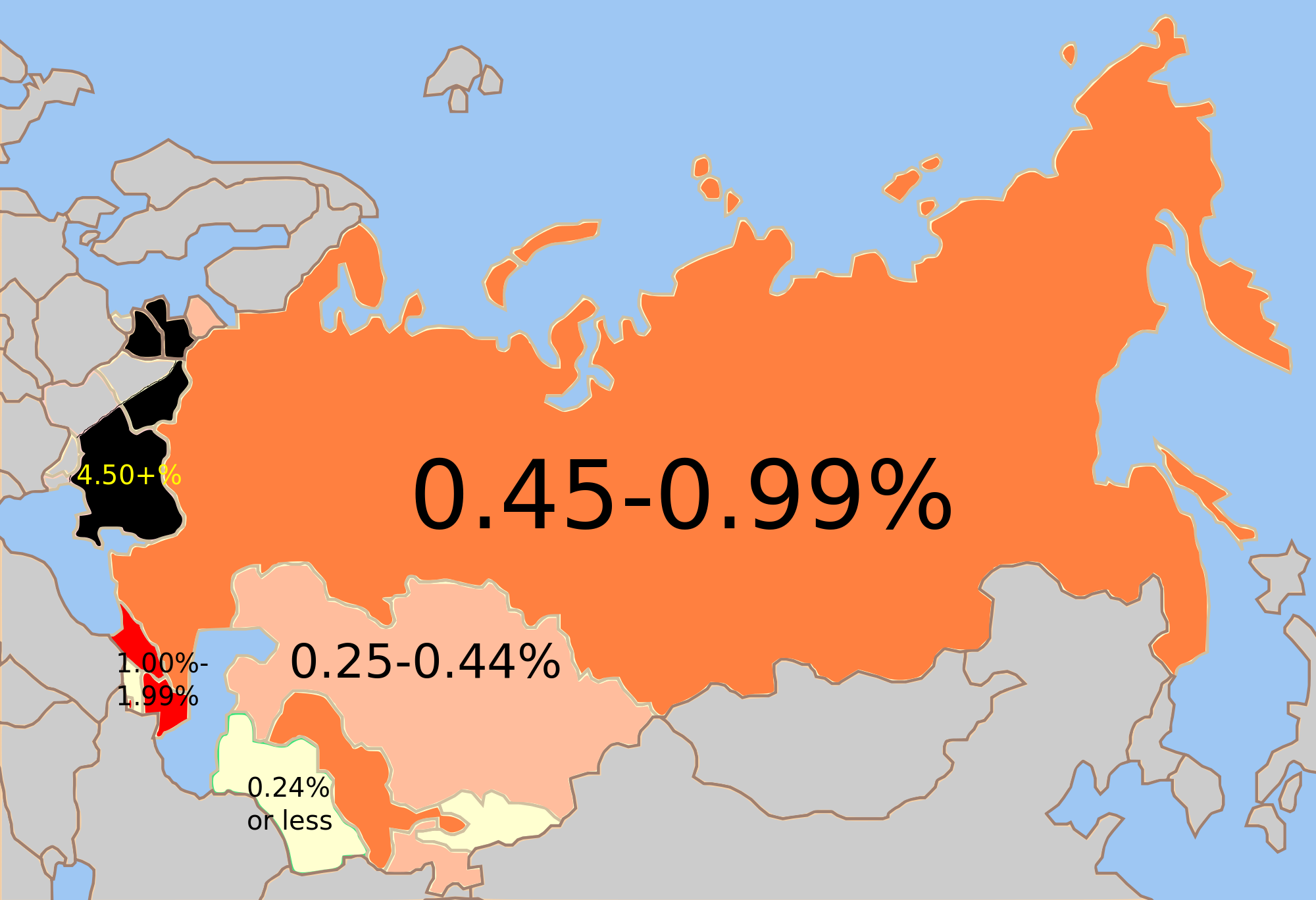
1939

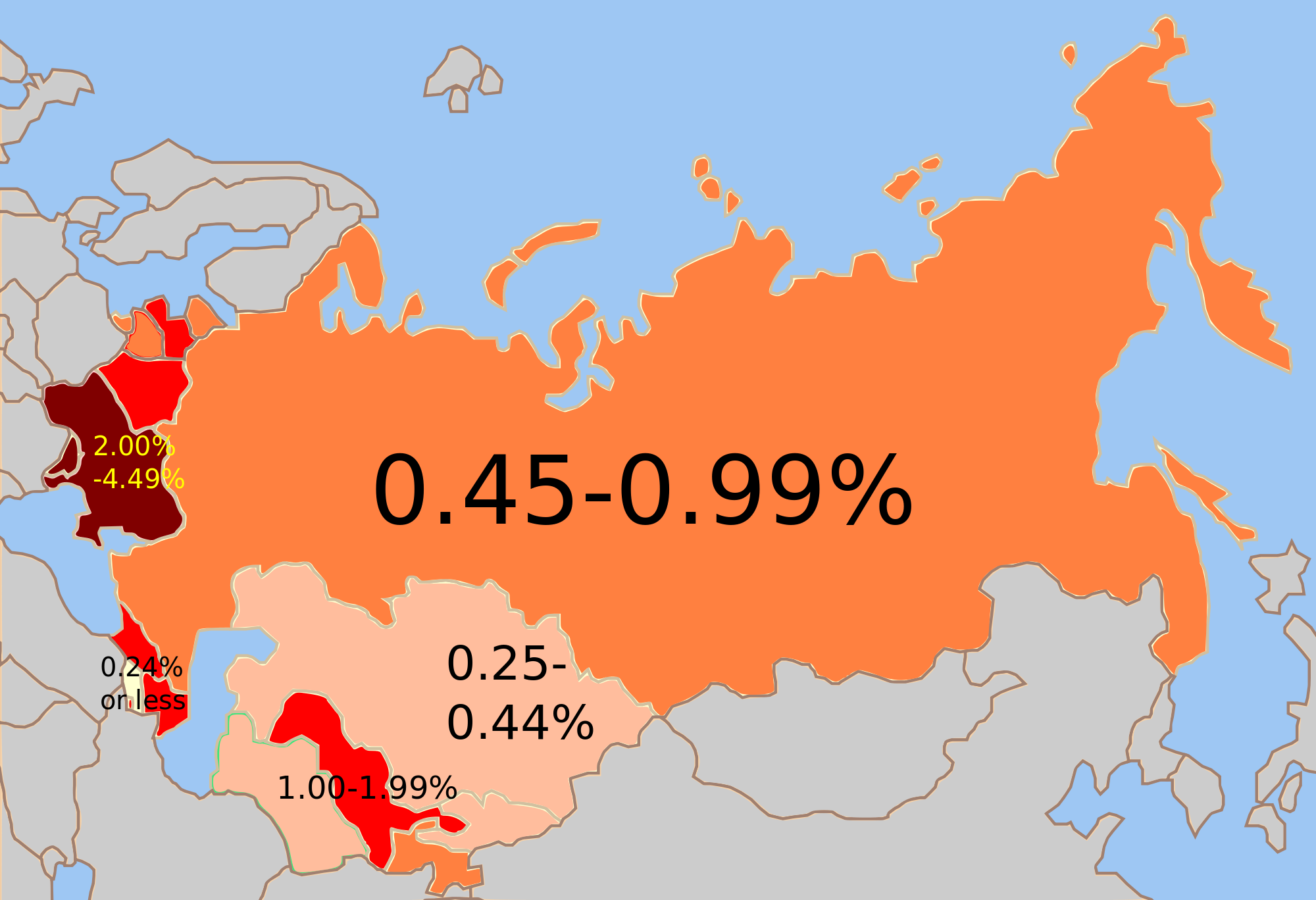
1959

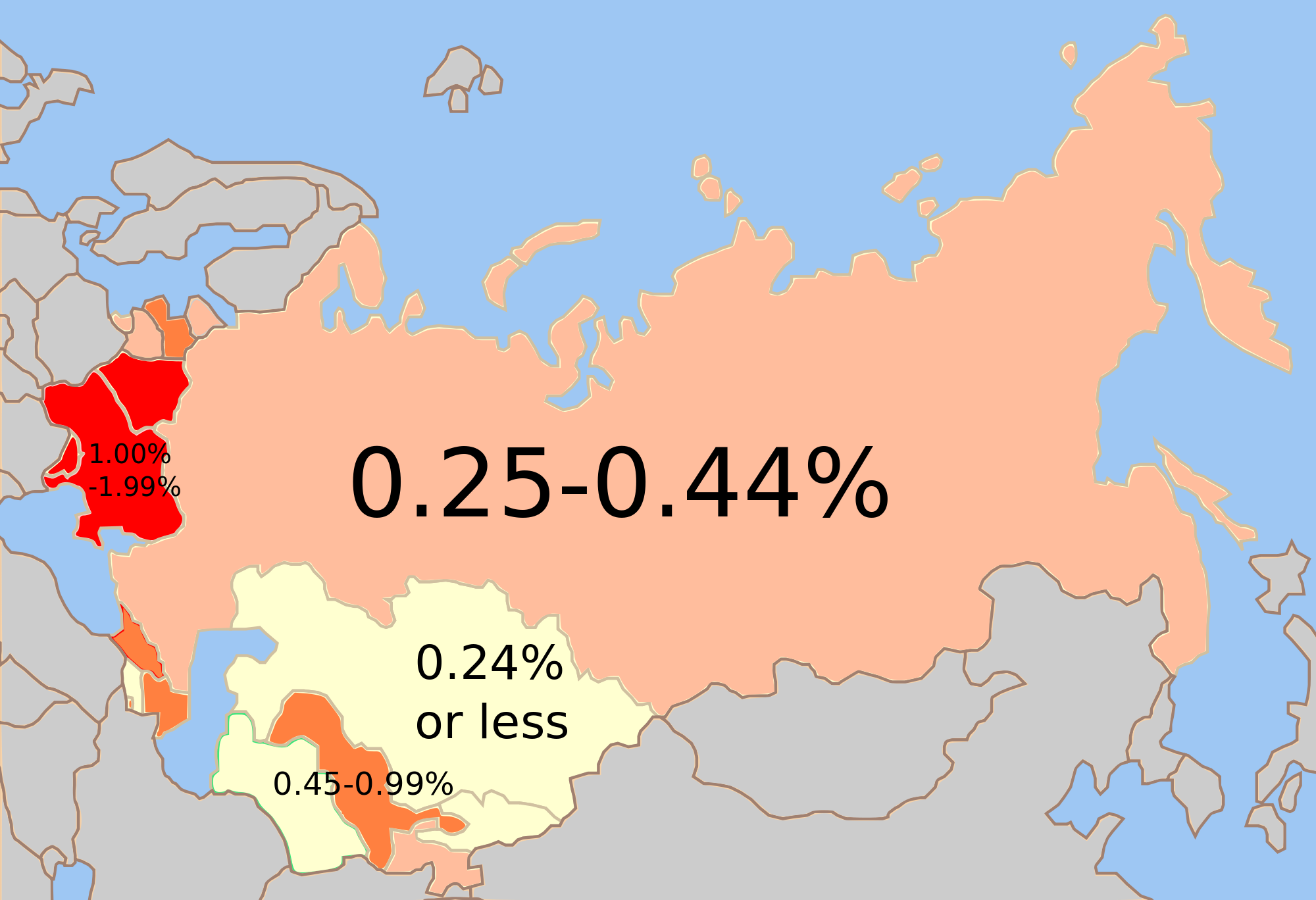
1989

Jewish population in each SSR and former SSR by year (using 1989 SSR borders)^{[a]}
| SSR | 1897 | 1926 | 1939 | 1959 | 1970 | 1979 | 1989 | 1999-2002 | 2009-2011 | 2019-2022 |
|---|---|---|---|---|---|---|---|---|---|---|
| Russian SFSR/Russia | 250,000 | 539,037 | 891,147 | 880,443 | 816,668 | 713,399 | 570,467 | 233,439 | 159,348 | 83,896 |
| Ukrainian SSR/Ukraine | 2,680,000 | 2,720,000 | 2,700,000^{[c]} | 840,446 | 777,406 | 634,420 | 487,555 | 106,600 | 71,500 | 45,000 |
| Byelorussian SSR/Belarus | | | 690,000^{[c]} | 150,090 | 148,027 | 135,539 | 112,031 | 24,300 | 12,926 | 13,705 |
| Uzbek SSR/Uzbekistan | | 37,896 | 50,676 | 94,488 | 103,058 | 100,067 | 95,104 | 40,000 | 15,000 | 9,865 |
| Azerbaijan SSR/Azerbaijan | | 59,768 | 41,245 | 46,091 | 49,057 | 44,345 | 41,072 | 8,916 | 9,084 | 9,500 |
| Latvian SSR/Latvia | | 95,675^{[b]} | 95,600 | 36,604 | 36,686 | 28,338 | 22,925 | 9,600 | 6,454 | 8,094 |
| Kazakh SSR/Kazakhstan | | 3,548 | 19,240 | 28,085 | 27,676 | 23,601 | 20,104 | 6,823 | 3,578 | 2,500 |
| Lithuanian SSR/Lithuania | | | 263,000 | 24,683 | 23,566 | 14,703 | 12,398 | 4,007 | 3,050 | 2,256^{[d]} |
| Estonian SSR/Estonia | | | 4,309 | 5,439 | 5,290 | 4,993 | 4,653 | 2,003 | 1,738 | 1,852 |
| Moldavian SSR/Moldova | | | 250,000 | 95,107 | 98,072 | 80,124 | 65,836 | 5,500 | 3,628 | 1,597^{[e]} |
| Georgian SSR/Georgia | | 30,389 | 42,300 | 51,582 | 55,382 | 28,298 | 24,795 | 2,333 | 2,000 | 1,405^{[e]} |
| Kirghiz SSR/Kyrgyzstan | | 318 | 1,895 | 8,607 | 7,677 | 6,836 | 6,005 | 1,571 | 604 | 433 |
| Turkmen SSR/Turkmenistan | | 2,045 | 3,037 | 4,102 | 3,530 | 2,866 | 2,509 | 1,000 | 700 | 200 |
| Armenian SSR/Armenia | | 335 | 512 | 1,042 | 1,049 | 962 | 747 | 109 | 127 | 150 |
| Tajik SSR/Tajikistan | | 275 | 5,166 | 12,435 | 14,627 | 14,697 | 14,580 | 197 | 36 | 25 |
| Soviet Union/Former Soviet Union | 5,250,000 | 2,672,499 | 3,028,538 | 2,279,277 | 2,166,026 | 1,830,317 | 1,479,732 | 460,000 | 280,678 | 180,478 |

Historical Russian Jewish population
| Year | Pop. | ±% |
|---|---|---|
| 1897 | 250,000 | — |
| 1926 | 539,037 | +115.6% |
| 1939 | 891,147 | +65.3% |
| 1959 | 880,443 | −1.2% |
| 1970 | 816,668 | −7.2% |
| 1979 | 713,399 | −12.6% |
| 1989 | 570,467 | −20.0% |
| 2002 | 233,439 | −59.1% |
| 2010 | 159,348 | −31.7% |
| 2021 | 83,896 | −47.4% |
Source: The Jewish population data includes Mountain Jews, Georgian Jews, Bukharan Jews (from Central Asia), Krymchaks (all per the 1959 Soviet census), and Tats.

Jewish population in each SSR and former SSR by year (using 1989 SSR borders) as a percent of the total population^{[a]}
| SSR | % 1926 | % 1939 | % 1959 | % 1970 | % 1979 | % 1989 | % 2002 | % 2010 |
|---|---|---|---|---|---|---|---|---|
| Russian SFSR/Russia | 0.58% | 0.81% | 0.75% | 0.63% | 0.52% | 0.39% | 0.18% | 0.11% |
| Ukrainian SSR/Ukraine | | 6.55%^{[c]} | 2.01% | 1.65% | 1.28% | 0.95% | 0.20% | 0.16% |
| Byelorussian SSR/Belarus | | 6.55%^{[c]} | 1.86% | 1.64% | 1.42% | 1.10% | 0.24% | 0.14% |
| Moldavian SSR/Moldova | | 3.30% | 2.75% | 2.03% | 1.52% | 0.13% | 0.11% | 0.06% |
| Estonian SSR/Estonia | | 0.38% | 0.45% | 0.39% | 0.34% | 0.30% | 0.14% | 0.13% |
| Latvian SSR/Latvia | 5.19%^{[b]} | 4.79% | 1.75% | 1.55% | 1.13% | 0.86% | 0.40% | 0.31% |
| Lithuanian SSR/Lithuania | | 9.13% | 0.91% | 0.75% | 0.43% | 0.34% | 0.10% | 0.10% |
| Georgian SSR/Georgia | 1.15% | 1.19% | 1.28% | 1.18% | 0.57% | 0.46% | 0.10% | 0.08% |
| Armenian SSR/Armenia | 0.04% | 0.04% | 0.06% | 0.04% | 0.03% | 0.02% | <0.01% | <0.01% |
| Azerbaijan SSR/Azerbaijan | 2.58% | 1.29% | 1.25% | 0.96% | 0.74% | 0.58% | 0.10% | 0.10% |
| Turkmen SSR/Turkmenistan | 0.20% | 0.24% | 0.27% | 0.16% | 0.10% | 0.07% | 0.01% | <0.01% |
| Uzbek SSR/Uzbekistan | 0.80% | 0.81% | 1.17% | 0.86% | 0.65% | 0.48% | 0.02% | 0.02% |
| Tajik SSR/Tajikistan | 0.03% | 0.35% | 0.63% | 0.50% | 0.39% | 0.29% | <0.01% | <0.01% |
| Kirghiz SSR/Kyrgyzstan | 0.03% | 0.13% | 0.42% | 0.26% | 0.20% | 0.14% | 0.02% | 0.01% |
| Kazakh SSR/Kazakhstan | 0.06% | 0.31% | 0.30% | 0.22% | 0.16% | 0.12% | 0.03% | 0.02% |
| Soviet Union/Former Soviet Union | 1.80% | 1.80% | 1.09% | 0.90% | 0.70% | 0.52% | 0.16% | 0.10% |

a The Jewish population data for all of the years includes Mountain Jews, Georgian Jews, Bukharan Jews (or Central Asian Jews), Krymchaks (all per the 1959 Soviet census), and Tats.
b The data is from 1925.
c The data is from 1941.
d Does not include 192 Karaim.
e The data is from 2014.

== Russian Jewish aliyah and immigration to countries outside Israel ==
=== Israel ===
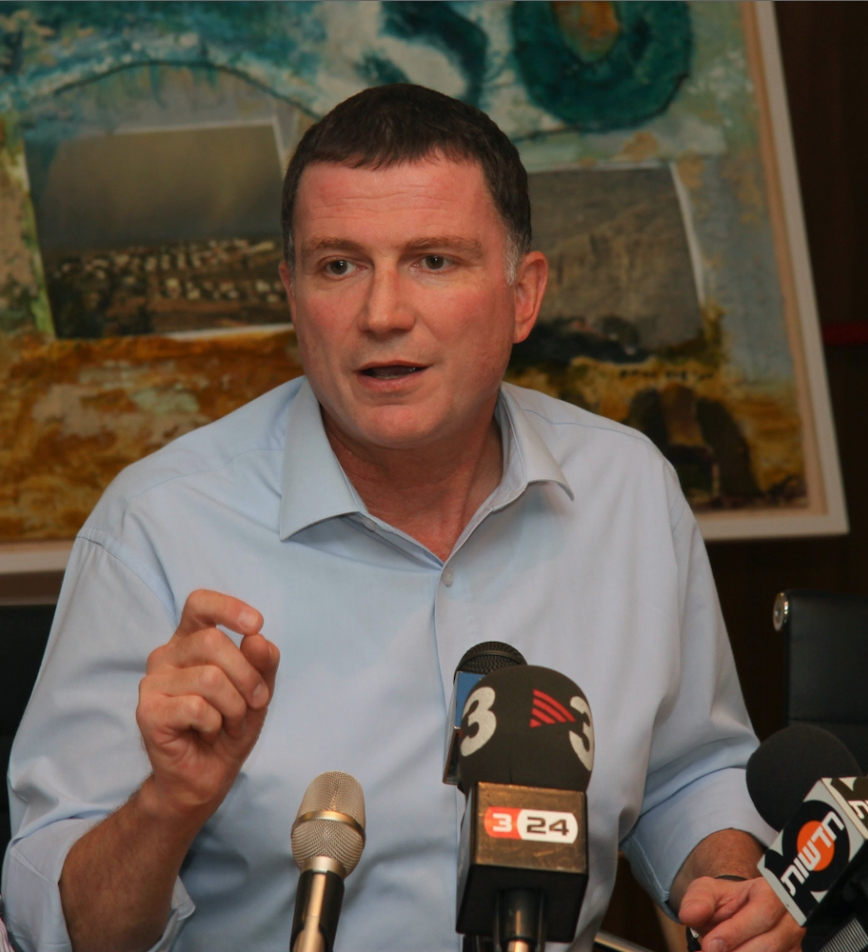
Yuli Edelstein, one of the Soviet Union's most prominent refuseniks, who served as Speaker of the Knesset (Israel's parliament) from 2013 to 2020.

| Year | TFR |
|---|---|
| 2000 | 1.544 |
| 1999 | 1.612 |
| 1998 | 1.632 |
| 1997 | 1.723 |
| 1996 | 1.743 |
| 1995 | 1.731 |
| 1994 | 1.756 |
| 1993 | 1.707 |
| 1992 | 1.604 |
| 1991 | 1.398 |
| 1990 | 1.390 |

In present times, the largest number of Russian Jews are olim (עוֹלים) and sabras. In 2011 Russians were around 15% of Israel's 7.7 million population (including Halakhally non-Jews who constituted about 30% of immigrants from the former Soviet Union). The Aliyah in the 1990s accounts for 85–90% of this population. The population growth rate for Former Soviet Union (FSU)-born olim were among the lowest for any Israeli groups, with a Fertility rate of 1.70 and natural increase of just +0.5% per year. The increase in Jewish birth rate in Israel during the 2000–2007 period was partly due to the increasing birth rate among the FSU olim, who now form 20% of the Jewish population of Israel. 96.5% of the enlarged Russian Jewish population in Israel either belong to Judaism or are non-religious, while 3.5% (35,000) belong to other religions (mostly Christianity) and about 10,000 identifying as Messianic Jews separate from Jewish Christians.

The Total Fertility Rate for FSU-born olim in Israel is given in the table below. The TFR increased with time, peaking in 1997, then slightly decreased after that and then again increased after 2000.

In 1999, about 1,037,000 FSU-born olim lived in Israel, of whom about 738,900 made aliyah after 1989. The second largest oleh (עוֹלֶה) group (Moroccan Jews) numbered just 1,000,000. From 2000 to 2006, 142,638 FSU-born olim moved to Israel, while 70,000 of them emigrated from Israel to countries like the U.S. and Canada—bringing the total population to 1,150,000 by January 2007. The natural increase was around 0.3% in the late 1990s. For example, 2,456 in 1996 (7,463 births to 5,007 deaths), 2,819 in 1997 (8,214 to 5,395), 2,959 in 1998 (8,926 to 5,967) and 2,970 in 1999 (9,282 to 6,312). In 1999, the natural growth was +0.385%. (Figures only for FSU-born olim moved in after 1989).

An estimated 45,000 illegal immigrants from the Former Soviet Union lived in Israel at the end of 2010, but it is not clear how many of them are actually Jews.

In 2013, 7,520 people, nearly 40% of all olim, made aliyah from the Former Soviet Union. In 2014 4,685 Russian citizens relocated to Israel, more than double than usual in any of the previous 16 years. In 2015, nearly 7,000 or just over twenty percent of all olim came from the former Soviet Union. As a consequence of the Russian invasion of Ukraine, the Jewish Agency reported in March 2022 that hundreds of Jewish refugees sheltering in Poland, Romania and Moldova were scheduled to leave for Israel the following week. Of an estimated 200,000 to 400,000 Jews in Ukraine, over 26.3% have fled the country; between 10,000 and 15,200 refugees had arrived in Israel. In September 2023 it was reported that over 43,000 Jews from Russia and over 15,000 Jews from Ukraine have fled to Israel. By August 2024, out of an estimated 30,000 Jews who immigrated to Israel since 7 October 2023, 17,000 Jews were from Russia and 900 Jews from Ukraine. One estimate in 2024 is that at current rates within 7 years 50% of Jewish population in Russia will have moved to Israel.

Recent olim and olot (עוֹלות) from the Former Soviet Union include notables such as Anna Zak, Natan Sharansky, Yuri Foreman, Yuli-Yoel Edelstein, Ze'ev Elkin, Nachman Dushanski, Boris Gelfand, Natasha Mozgovaya, Avigdor Lieberman, Roman Dzindzichashvili, Anastassia Michaeli, Haim Megrelashvili, Victor Mikhalevski, Evgeny Postny, Maxim Rodshtein, Tatiana Zatulovskaya, Maria Gorokhovskaya, Katia Pisetsky, Aleksandr Averbukh, Anna Smashnova, Jan Talesnikov, Vadim Alexeev, Michael Kolganov, Alexander Danilov, Evgenia Linetskaya, Marina Kravchenko, David Kazhdan, Leonid Nevzlin, Vadim Akolzin, Roman Bronfman, Michael Cherney, Arcadi Gaydamak, Sergei Sakhnovski, Roman Zaretski, Alexandra Zaretski, Larisa Trembovler, Boris Tsirelson, Ania Bukstein, and Margarita Levieva.

=== United States ===
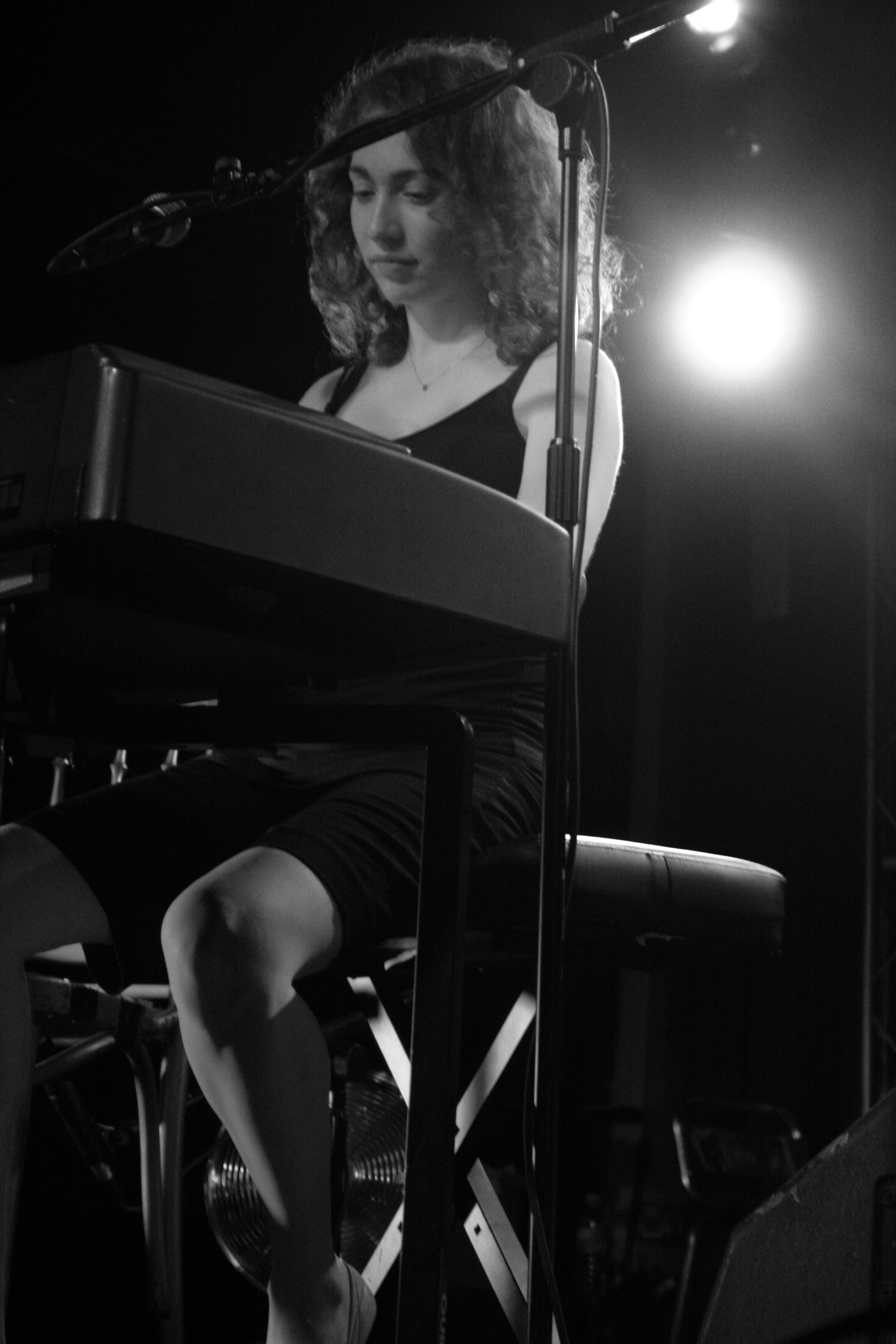
American singer Regina Spektor, who cites poets such as Pasternak in her songs.

The second largest Russian Jewish population is in the United States. According to RINA, there is a core Russian Jewish population of 350,000 in the U.S. The enlarged Russian Jewish population in the U.S. is estimated to be 700,000.

Notable Russia, Imperial Russia, Soviet Union, and former Soviet Union, born Jewish Americans (living and deceased) include Alexei Abrikosov, Isaac Asimov, Leonard Blavatnik, Sergey Brin, Joseph Brodsky, Sergei Dovlatov, Anthony Fedorov, Israel Gelfand, Emma Goldman, Vladimir Horowitz, Gregory Kaidanov, Avi Kaplan, Anna Khachiyan, Jan Koum, Savely Kramarov, Mila Kunis, Leonid Levin, Lev Loseff, Alexander Migdal, Eugene Mirman, Alla Nazimova, Leonard Nimoy, Ayn Rand, Markus Rothkovich (Mark Rothko), Dmitry Salita, Menachem Mendel Schneerson, Yakov Sinai, Mikhail Shifman, Mikhail Shufutinsky, Regina Spektor, Willi Tokarev, and Arkady Vainshtein.

Large Russian Jewish communities include Brighton Beach and Sheepshead Bay in the Brooklyn Borough of New York City; Fair Lawn and nearby areas in Bergen County, New Jersey; Bucks and Montgomery Counties near Philadelphia; Pikesville, Maryland, a predominantly-Jewish suburb of Baltimore; Washington Heights in the Sunny Isles Beach neighborhood of South Florida; Skokie and Buffalo Grove, suburbs of Chicago; and West Hollywood, California.

=== Germany ===
The fourth largest Russian-Jewish community exists in Germany with a core Russian-Jewish population of 119,000 and an enlarged population of 250,000.

In the 1991–2006 period, approximately 230,000 ethnic Jews from the FSU immigrated to Germany. In the beginning of 2006, Germany tightened the immigration program. A survey conducted among approximately 215,000 enlarged Russian Jewish population (taking natural decrease into consideration) indicated that about 81% of the enlarged population was religiously Jewish or Atheist, while about 18.5% identified as Christian. That gives a core Russian Jewish population of 111,800 (religiously Jewish, 52%) or 174,150 (religiously Jewish or Atheist).

Notable Russian Jews in Germany include Valery Belenky, Maxim Biller, Friedrich Gorenstein, Wladimir Kaminer, Lev Kopelev, Elena Kuschnerova, Alfred Schnittke, Vladimir Voinovich, and Lilya Zilberstein.

=== Canada ===
The fifth largest Russian Jewish community is in Canada. The core Russian Jewish population in Canada numbers 30,000 and the enlarged Russian Jewish population numbered 50,000+, mostly in Montreal and Toronto. Notable Russian Jewish residents include judoka Mark Berger, ice hockey player Eliezer Sherbatov, voice actress Tara Strong, and the musical group Tasseomancy.

=== Australia ===
Jews from the former Soviet Union settled in Australia in two migration waves in the 1970s and 1990s. About 5,000 immigrated in the 1970s and 7,000 to 8,000 in the 1990s. The estimated population of Jews from the former Soviet Union in Australia is 10,000 to 11,000, constituting about 10% of the Australian Jewish population. About half of the Jews from the former Soviet Union are from Ukraine and a third from the Russian Federation.

=== Finland ===
Hundreds of Russian Jews have moved to Finland since 1990 and have helped to stem the negative population growth of the Jewish community there. The total number of Jews in Finland have grown from 800 in 1980 to 1,200 in 2006. Of all the schoolgoing Jewish children, 75% have at least one Russian born parent.

=== Other countries ===
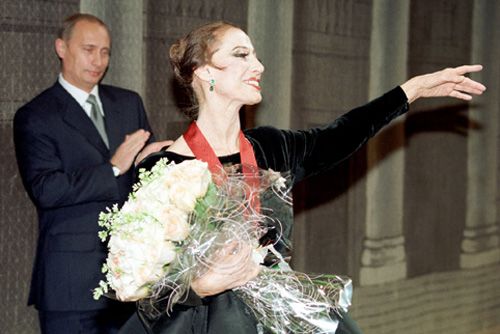
Maya Plisetskaya receives a governmental award from President of Russia Vladimir Putin on 20 November 2000.

Austria, Belgium, Britain, Italy, Netherlands, New Zealand and Switzerland also have small populations of Russian Jews. The addition of Russian Jews have neutralized the negative Jewish population trends in some European countries like the Netherlands and Austria. Notable Russian Jews in France include Léon Bakst, Marc Chagall, Leon Poliakov, Evgeny Kissin, Alexandre Koyré, Ida Rubinstein, Lev Shestov, and Anatoly Vaisser. Some other notable Russian Jews are Roman Abramovich, Vladimir Ashkenazy, Boris Berezovsky, and Maxim Vengerov (United Kingdom), Gennadi Sosonko (Netherlands), Viktor Korchnoi (Switzerland), and Maya Plisetskaya (Spain).

== Russian Prime Ministers of Jewish origin ==
- Sergey Kiriyenko, Prime Minister of Russia (1998)
- Yevgeny Primakov, Prime Minister of Russia (1998–1999)
- Mikhail Fradkov, Prime Minister of Russia (2004–2007)
- Mikhail Mishustin, Prime Minister of Russia (2020–present)

== See also ==
- Antisemitism in Russia
- Antisemitism in the Soviet Union
- History of the Jews in Armenia
- History of the Jews in Azerbaijan
- History of the Jews in Belarus
- History of the Jews in Central Asia
- History of the Jews in Estonia
- History of the Jews in Georgia
- History of the Jews in Kazakhstan
- History of the Jews in Latvia
- History of the Jews in Lithuania
- History of the Jews in the Soviet Union
- History of the Jews in Ukraine
- Jewish Autonomous Oblast
- Jews and Judaism in the Jewish Autonomous Oblast
- Gerim
