= Nevsky Prospect =

Thoroughfare in Saint Petersburg, Russia

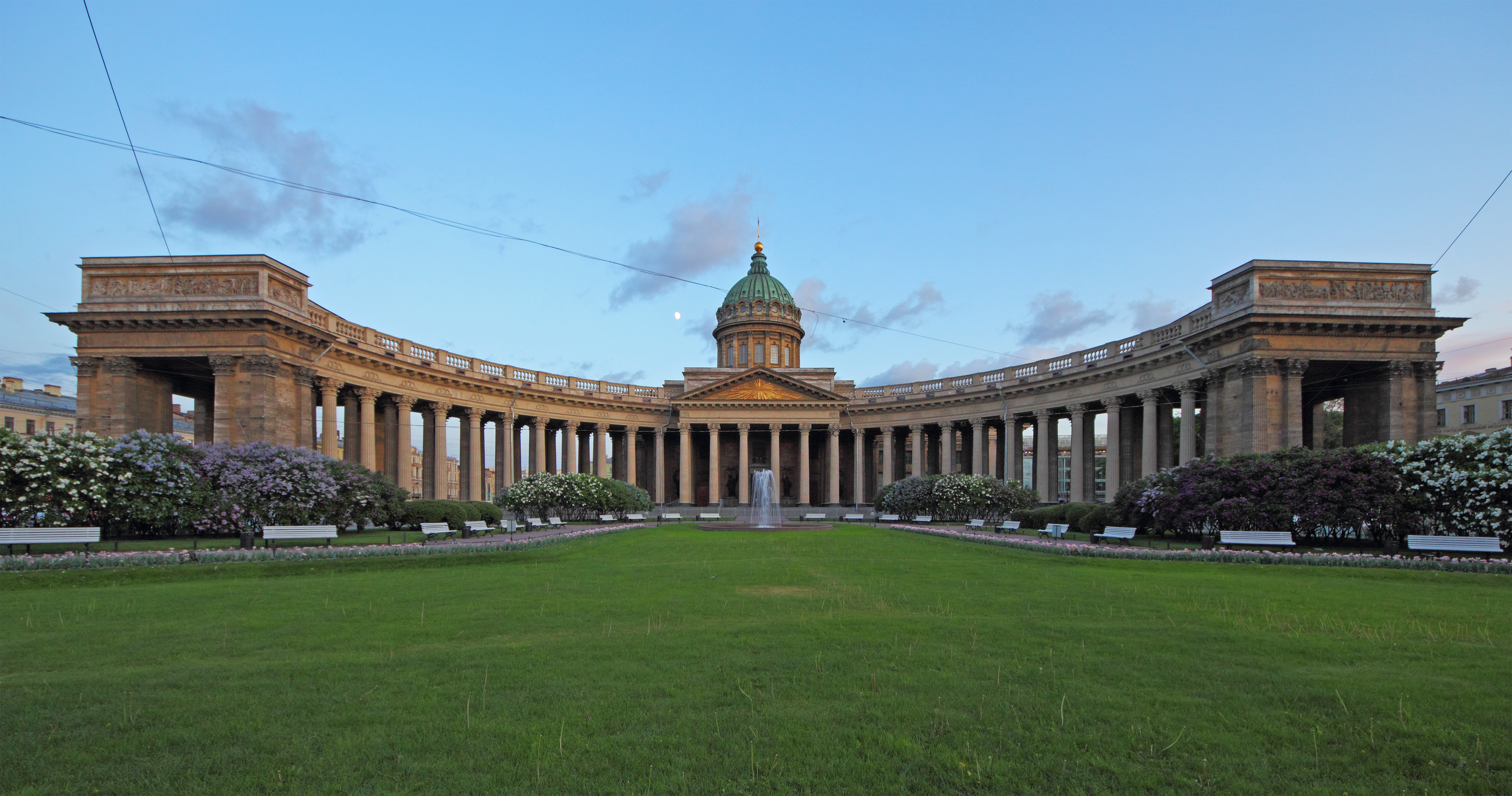
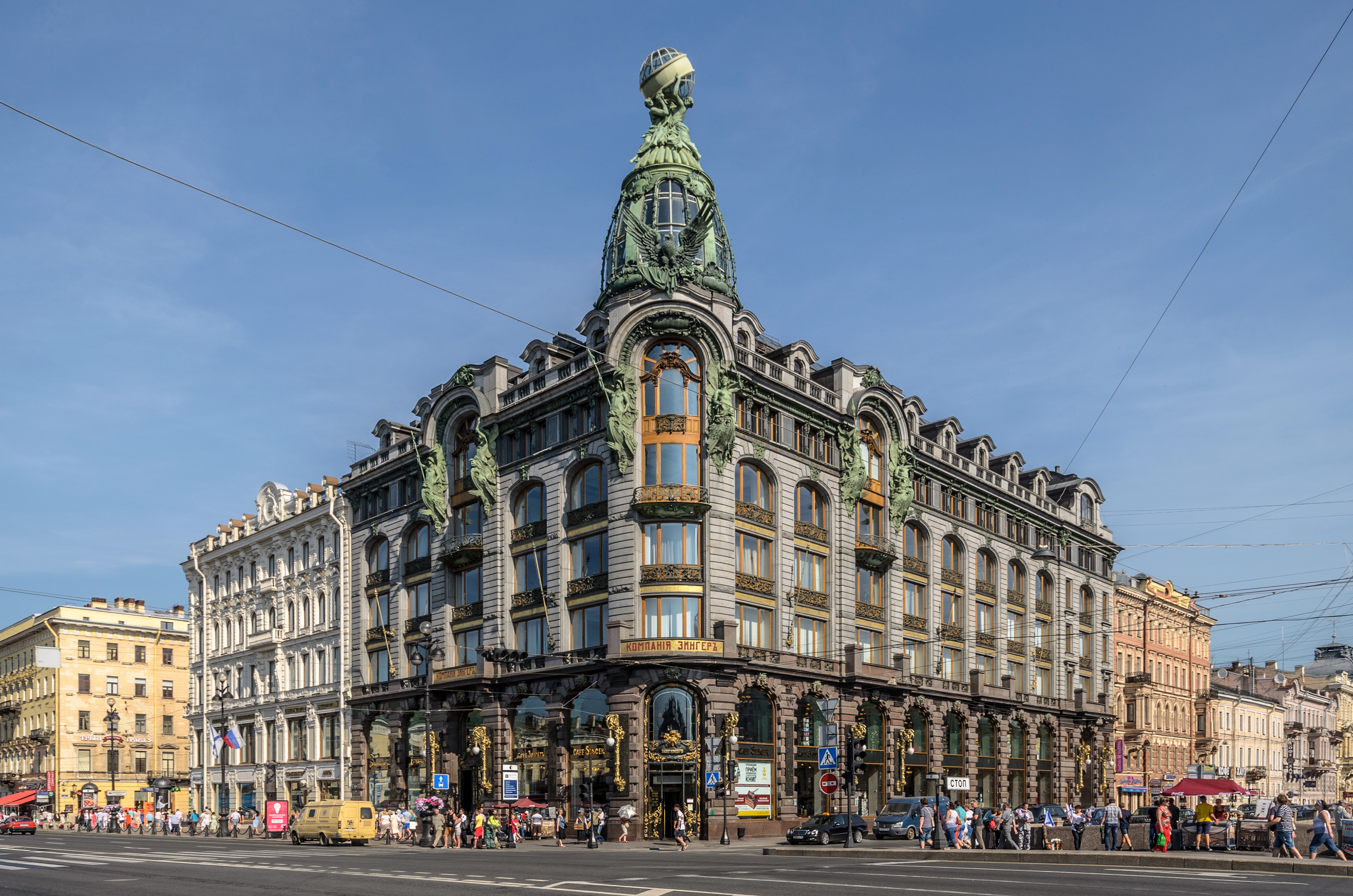
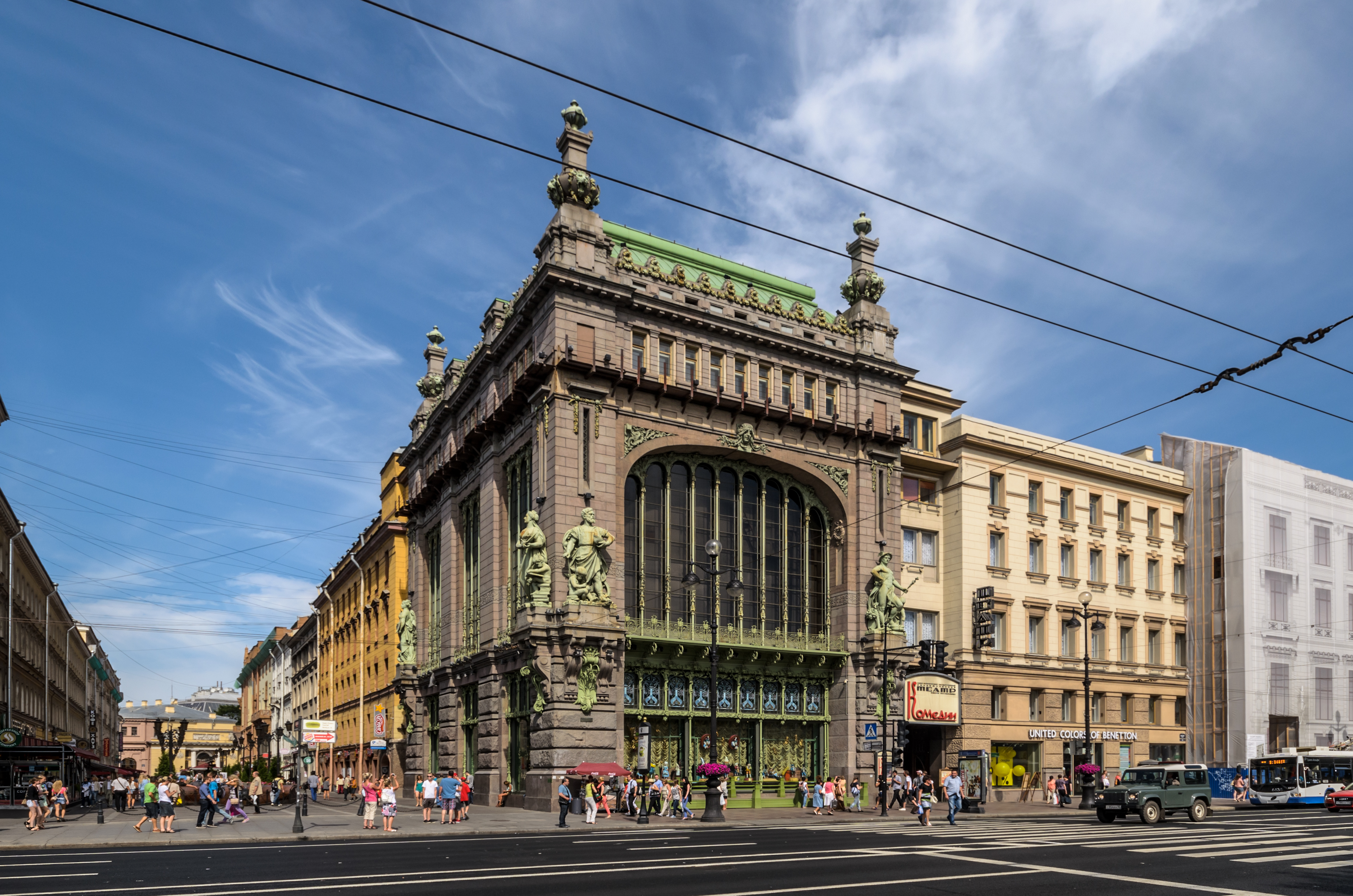
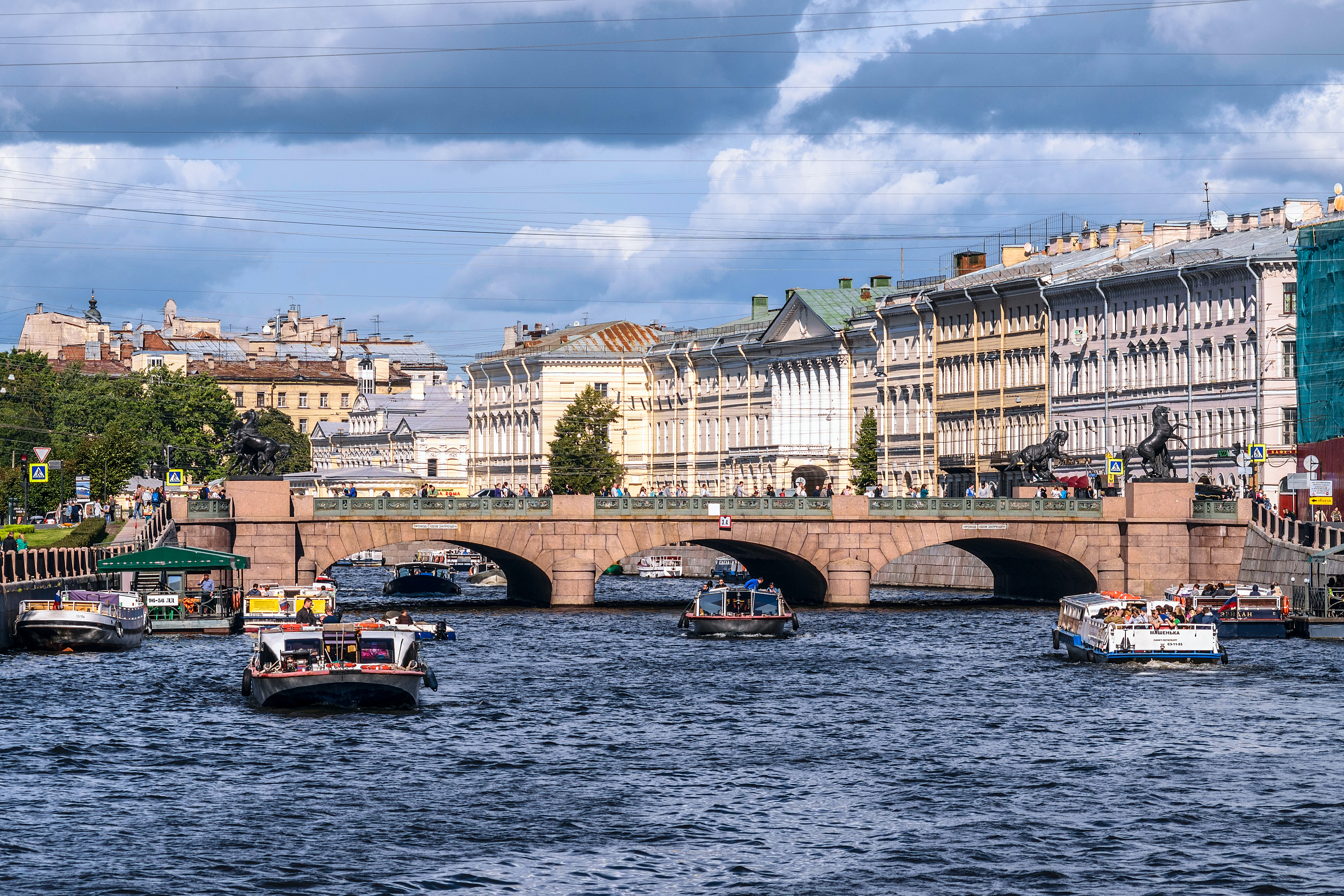
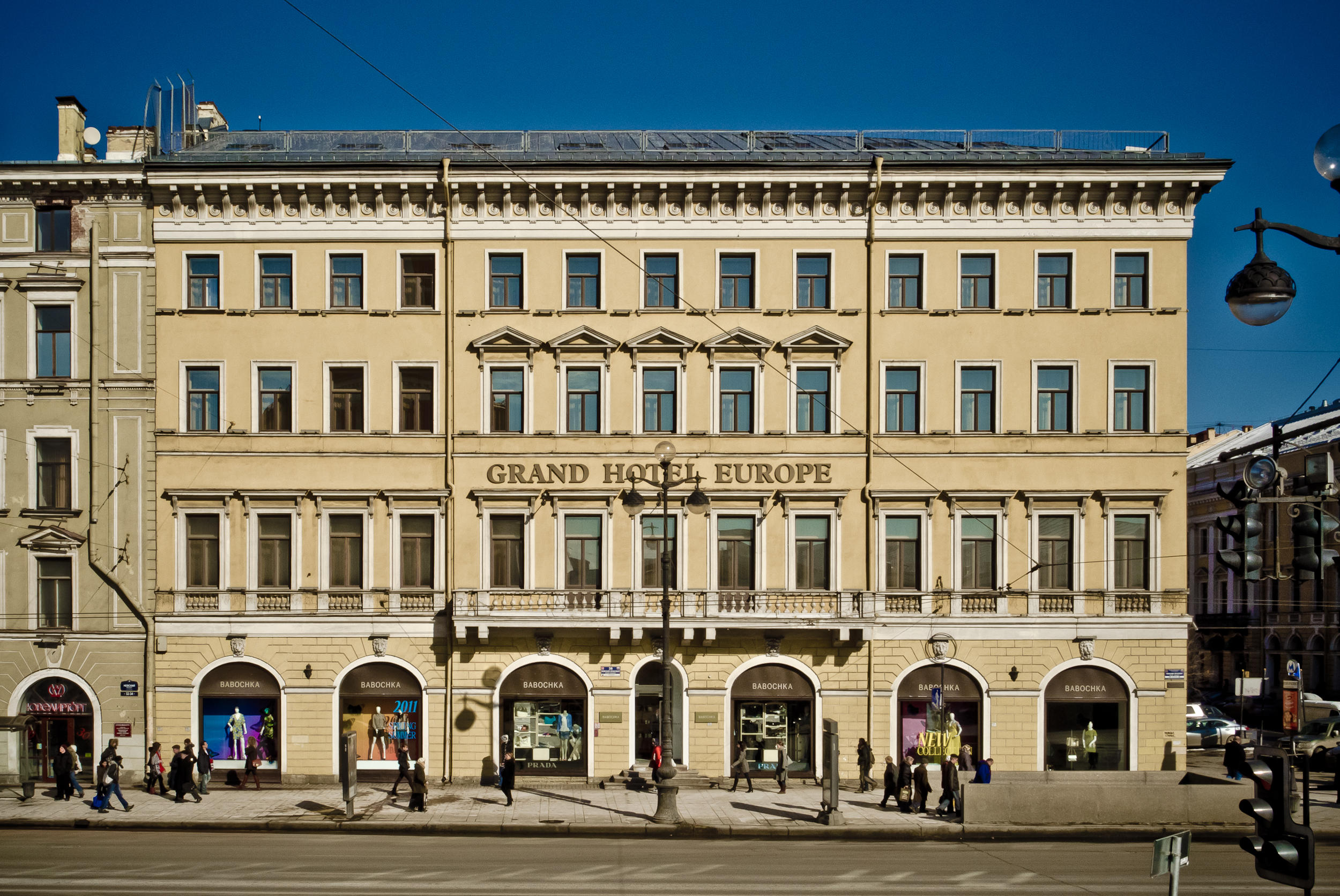
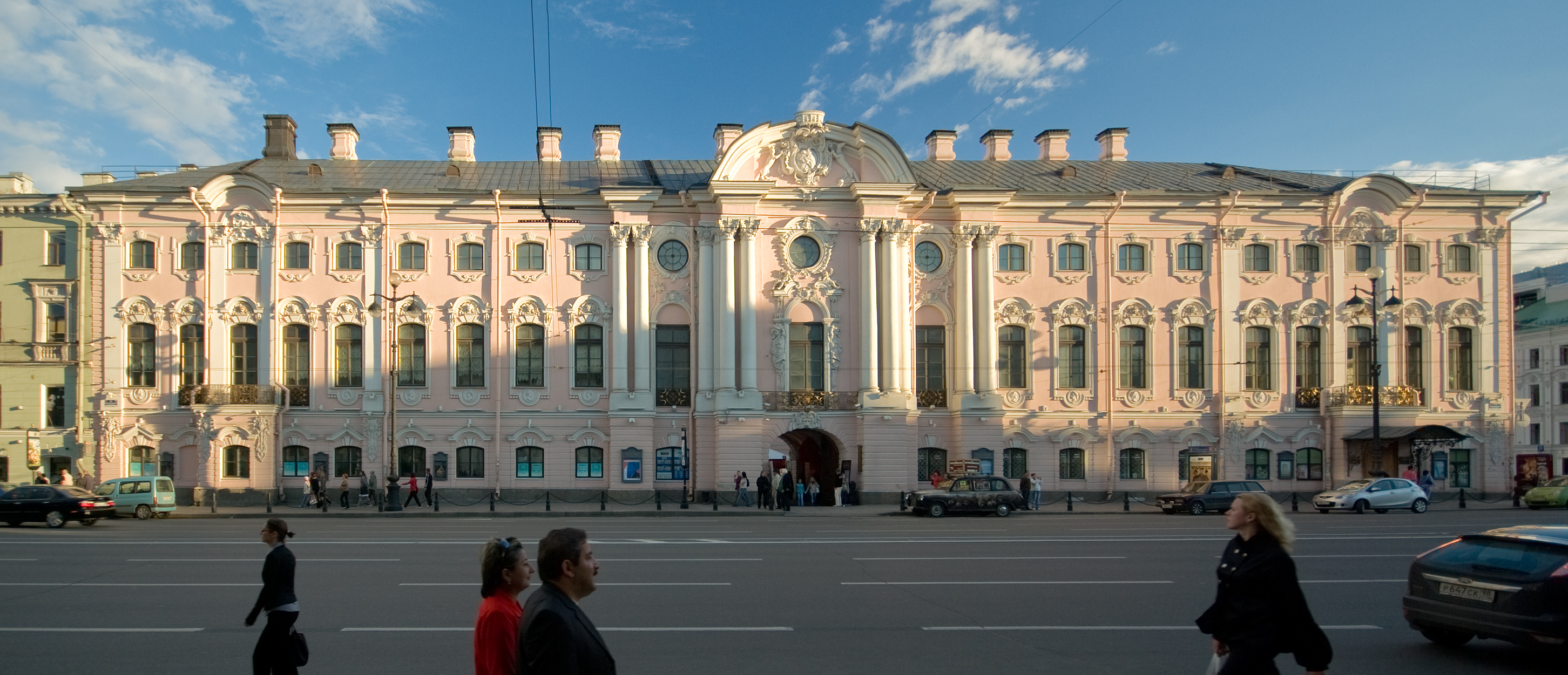
- Clockwise from top: Kazan Cathedral, Eliseyev Emporium, Grand Hotel Europe, Stroganov Palace, Anichkov Bridge, Singer House
- Interactive map of Nevsky Prospect
- Native name: Не́вский проспе́кт (Russian)
- Former name: 25 October Prospect
- Location: St. Petersburg
- Coordinates: 59.9318°N 30.3528°E

Nevsky Prospect (Russian: Не́вский проспе́кт, romanized: Nevsky prospekt, IPA: [ˈnʲɛfskʲɪj prɐˈspʲɛkt]) is a main street (high street) located in the federal city of St. Petersburg in Russia. Its name comes from the Alexander Nevsky Lavra, the monastery which stands at the eastern end of the street, and which commemorates the Russian hero Prince Saint Alexander Nevsky (1221–1263). Following his founding of Saint Petersburg in 1703, Tsar Peter I planned the course of the street as the beginning of the road to Novgorod and Moscow. The avenue runs from the Admiralty in the west to the Moscow Railway Station and, after veering slightly southwards at Vosstaniya Square, to the Alexander Nevsky Lavra.

== History of the street ==
=== Early 18th century. Reign of Peter the Great ===
On September 5, 1704, Admiralty of the Saint Petersburg was laid on the left side of the Neva River. The area adjacent to the fortress began to be built up. In the area of modern Bolshaya Morskaya and Malaya Morskaya streets, settlements of ship craftsmen appeared, which were wooden houses and huts with front gardens. On the site of Palace Square a "Sea" market appeared, with huts and chests, wagons with firewood and hay stood. The area near the Admiralty became one of the most densely populated parts of the city.

In the early 1710s, a monastery (the future Alexander Nevsky Lavra) appeared on the left side of the Neva at the confluence of the Chernaya Rechka (now it is Monastyrka River). At the time, it was assumed that the famous Battle of the Neva took place there in 1240, where the Russian squad led by the Novgorod prince Alexander Nevsky defeated the Swedes. Near the monastery, there was a whole settlement with wooden houses for workers and servants, as well as a garden and a vegetable garden with numerous outbuildings: carpentry, blacksmiths and cattle yards, a mill, a cellar, and trade shops.

It became necessary to connect the two city centers with the old Novgorodsky tract (which ran approximately along the route of the modern Ligovsky prospect), which led inland. By imperial command, the construction of clearings began, which went through the swampy forest. The most swampy areas were in the area of modern Kazansky Cathedral, Mikhailovskaya Street, especially in the area between Ligovsky Prospect and Alexander Nevsky Lavra, which were a continuous chain of swamps. In 1712 the monks of the monastery began to pave the road from the monastery to the Novgorod tract, by 1718 it was completed ( ' ... paved and managed' ). A fairly simple technology was used to overcome the bog swamps: they cut down the forest, uprooted the stumps. Drainage ditches were dug to drain excess water and drain the swamps. fascines were laid along the road, covering them with sand. It is believed that the more difficult section ("monastery") was completed first. Translation in English of the quote about the Nevskaya perspective:

Large promising road, Large perspective, Nevskaya perspective – the name of Nevsky prospect in those years ... starting from the Admiralty itself and continuing to the Alexandronevsky monastery, built ... in 1713

— Andrew Ivanovich Bogdanov, Historical, geographical and topographic description of St. Petersburg from the beginning of its establishment, from 1703 to 1751. 10. Admiralty Island

The first section of the highway from Moika to Fontanka was laid from 1710 to 1715, and then work continued on the section from Moika to the Admiralty. Along the Glukhoi channel (the current Griboyedov Canal) and further to modern Sadovaya Street, the so-called Resettlement Settlements arose, in which "artisans" with families were settled, transferred from Central Russia to St. Petersburg under construction by decree of 1710. Between the settlements and the Nevskaya Proseka, there was a strip of swampy forest, forbidden to felling on pain of severe punishment and even for walking. The left side of the avenue from Moika to Fontanka, occupied by the gardens of the Empress Ekaterina Alekseevna, was guarded by sentries. Periodically, rampant searches were carried out, those who were found to have felled trees were beaten by batog at the "Big Perspective". In 1721-23, on the banks of the Fontanka, a stone palace was erected for Empress Ekaterina Alekseevna, and during his reign, they laid out a regular garden called Italian. The garden occupied a huge space along the route of modern Nevsky Prospekt from Fontanka to modern Vosstaniya streets.

One way or another, Nevsky Prospect emerged in the second half of the 1710s. The glades from the Admiralty and from the Lavra together formed the future Nevsky Prospect. It is precisely the fact that the two roads were laid independently of each other that explains the break in the highway in the area of modern Vosstaniya Square.

The avenue immediately became a major highway in demand and, after building bridges over water obstacles, completely replaced the old path. The large perspective turned out to be about 4 miles long (4.5 kilometers), and 9 fathoms wide (about 20 meters). A wooden drawbridge Green bridge across the Moika was erected in 1720. The crossing was the city border in 1703–1726, taxes gathered here, for this there was Mytny Dvor, next to which was Gostiny Dvor. Even earlier, a bridge was built across the Fontanka, in 1715 Emperor Peter I issued a decree: "Over the Big Neva on the Fountain River, there is a prospect to create a bridge." By May 1716, the work was completed, and a wooden girder bridge on pile supports blocked both the channel itself and the swampy floodplain. In 1726 a guardhouse was erected and the city border was moved here.

=== 1725–1762. Nevsky Prospect in the Era of Palace coups ===
The great prospect became the main road: it was along it, as stated in the Senate decree of 1726, "there is always both arrival and departure of foreign and Russian subjects from everywhere to St. Petersburg." The government invested money in the improvement and cleanliness of the highway. In the 1720s, the initial section of the road running along Admiralty Meadow was landscaped: four rows of birches were planted on the sides, which were regularly trimmed, the road was paved with stones. In 1723, the avenue was the first in Russia to receive street lighting: oil lanterns were installed, later benches for passers-by appeared under them.

Translation in English of the quote: Description of this alley, made in 1721 by a chamber junker in the duke's retinue Karl-Friedrich of Holstein-Gottorp:

At about six in the evening we arrived safely in St. Petersburg, which has changed so much since my departure from there that I did not recognize it at all. From the very beginning we entered a long and wide alley, (a small part of the road not far from the Admiralty), and justly called the avenue, because its end is almost invisible. It was laid only in a few years and exclusively by the hands of captured Swedes. Despite the fact that the trees planted on both sides of it in three or four rows are still small, it is unusually beautiful in its enormous length and the purity in which it is kept (captured Swedes must clean it every Saturday), and it makes a wonderful appearance, which I have not seen anywhere else. On the Admiralty, a beautiful and huge building at the end of this road, there is a beautiful and rather tall spitz, which goes directly opposite the avenue

— Friedrich-Wilhelm von Berchholtz, Diary entry from 4 [O.S. 1721 ] July a

By the end of the first quarter of the 18th century, the buildings of the Great Perspective were few. In the beginning, there were several small houses, on the right side at the corner of the Moika there was a Mytny Dvor, behind the Moika there were salt barns. On the site of the modern Gostiny Dvor, a birch grove was green, then there were "perevedenskie settlements" consisting of wooden houses. The vast territory on the left side of the road from Moika to Fontanka was owned by Empress Catherine I, was low, swampy and undeveloped. The suburb of St Petersburg began behind the Fontanka. On the right side were the houses of the Anichkov settlement, where the soldiers of the Admiralty Workers' Battalion lived under the command of Lieutenant Colonel M. O. Anichkov. This battalion in 1715 built a wooden bridge across the Fontanka, called Anichkov Bridge.

Behind this narrow access bridge, from 1726, there was a wooden guard house, documents were checked and the barrier was raised. A canal was laid along the route of the current Ligovsky Prospekt, which supplied water to the Summer Garden fountains. Further, the territory was covered with forest and almost not developed. Buildings appeared only closer to the monastery, where land was allotted "in a line along the promising road" for the workers and employees of the monastery.

The construction of the avenue did not end there. In 1723, Peter I ordered to 'lay' the road from the cathedral church to the Admiralty in a prospective way. The road was supposed to abut against the vertical dominant – Trinity Cathedral of the Alexander Nevsky Monastery. For a number of reasons, it was not possible to realize this idea – the cathedral did not become a dominant feature and the road was not straightened. The idea of straightening the street was returned in the 1730s and the route was drawn along modern Goncharnaya and Telezhnaya streets. The original section of the avenue was given the name Staro-Nevsky. Later in the 1760s, the two directions were merged and Nevsky Prospekt got its modern look.

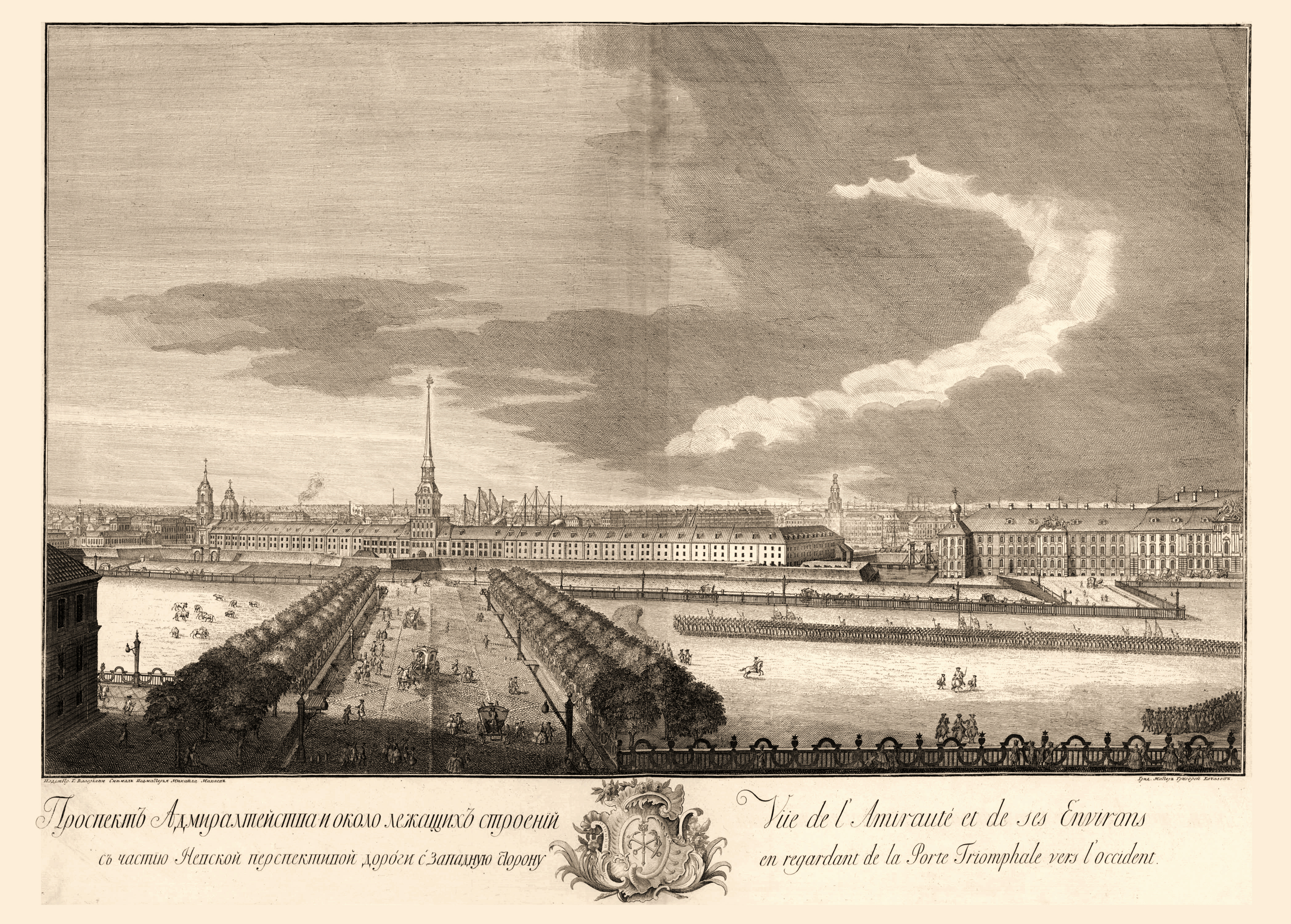
Nevsky prospect near Admiralty in 1753. Engraving A. Kachalova

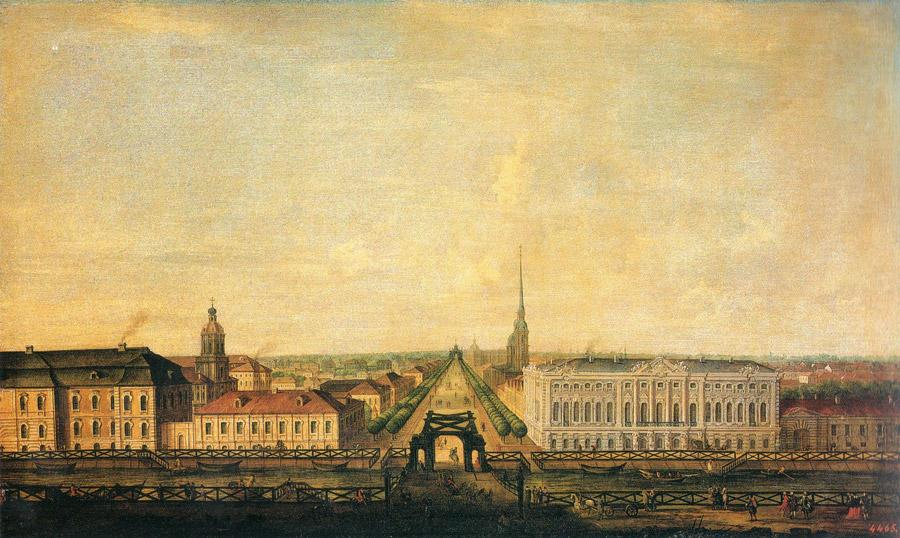
View of Nevsky Prospekt and Stroganov Palace, third quarter of the 18th century. Further to the right is the Church of the Nativity of the Virgin, to the left – the Lutheran Church of St Peter

After a four-year stay in Moscow, in 1732 the courtyard of Anna Ioannovna returned to St Petersburg. For this event, the avenue was renovated and two triumphal arches were built on it (one at the Anichkov Bridge at the entrance to the city, the other at the bridge across the Moika), the event itself was quite pompous. The construction of the first large stone buildings began. The most significant of them was the Church of the Nativity of the Blessed Virgin Mary, erected in 1733–1737 according to the project Mikhail Zemtsov on the site of the park in front of the current Kazan Cathedral. The temple was a rectangular building stretched along the avenue, similar in composition to Peter and Paul Cathedral. On the opposite side, in 1730, the Lutheran Church of St Peter appeared, located in the depths of the site. Two symmetrical residential buildings (which have not survived to this day) overlooked the avenue.

All buildings on the shady side of the early 18th century were destroyed in the fire of 1736. Mytny Dvor caught fire, then the flame spread to the neighboring wooden buildings. The fire raged for several hours, and as a result, several quarters of philistine wooden houses near the Admiralty burned down. The second fire happened a year later, destroying most of the buildings in the center of St Petersburg. After that, according to the Commission on the St. Petersburg Building, wooden houses on Nevsky were no longer built.

The Neva perspective became the most important factor that influenced the change in the layout of the entire settlement. She, together with Vosnesensky Prospect and Gorokhovaya Street, became part of the famous Admiralty "trident", which was approved by the Commission on the St. Petersburg building under the leadership of Pyotr Yeropkin. As a result, a powerful organizing structure was imposed on the disordered layout, and the status of the city center was finally entrenched for the Admiralty side. Since 1739, the main stone building was carried out on Nevsky Prospekt. It was carried out according to a strict plan, the houses were displayed with the main facades on the red line and were built according to standard "model" drawings developed by M.G. Zemtsov. These were one-story buildings, built on a high "cellar" semi-storey, processed by rustic. The central part of the facade is highlighted by an attic; next to it there was a gate that served as an entrance to the courtyard. The houses were distinguished by different pediments and attics, arrangement of windows, drawing of pilasters, platband s and decorative details. Such buildings appeared in the late 1730s – early 1740s along the highway between Moika and Fontanka. Land plots for the construction of houses on the avenue were acquired by state councilors, generals, wealthy merchants, factory owners, courtiers. Soon, members of the royal family and their entourage began to receive land, and the construction of palaces began. The first such structure was Anichkov Palace, intended for Elizaveta Petrovna, with a whole palace and park ensemble that arose on the site from Fontanka to present-day Sadovaya Street, with a huge regular garden with fountains enclosed by a stone wall, gazebos, greenhouses, ponds and covered walkways. The construction of the palace began in 1741 according to Zemtsov's drawings, and was completed in the 1750s Francesco Bartolomeo Rastrelli. Anichkov Palace is the oldest building on Nevsky Prospekt, preserved to this day.

Nevsky Prospekt on the 1753 map

In the 1740s, the site at the corner with the Moika River was occupied by a two-story house Barons Stroganovs. In 1752 it burned down and in its place, according to the design of the architect FB Rastrelli, was built Stroganov Palace with an extensive courtyard. A large wooden Winter Palace, built by Rastrelli for the royal family, grew nearby in 1755. The palace occupied the territory of two modern quarters, with its main facade facing Nevsky Prospekt from Moika to the present Malaya Morskaya Street. It was a temporary structure until the completion of the construction of the stone Winter Palace on the banks of the Neva; it was dismantled after the death of Elizaveta Petrovna. With the appearance of the royal residence and palaces of nobles on the avenue, more attention was paid to landscaping. By the decree of Elizabeth Petrovna in 1756, it was forbidden for the townsfolk to hang clothes on the trees to dry. The pavement was laid with stones of various shapes, sizes and colors, making up squares, triangles and stripes. By the end of the 18th century, the embankments of the Fontanka and the Catherine Canal were dressed in granite, and the stone bridges Kazansky and Anichkov were thrown across them. Birches were removed, and the Nevskaya perspective became wider and more spacious.

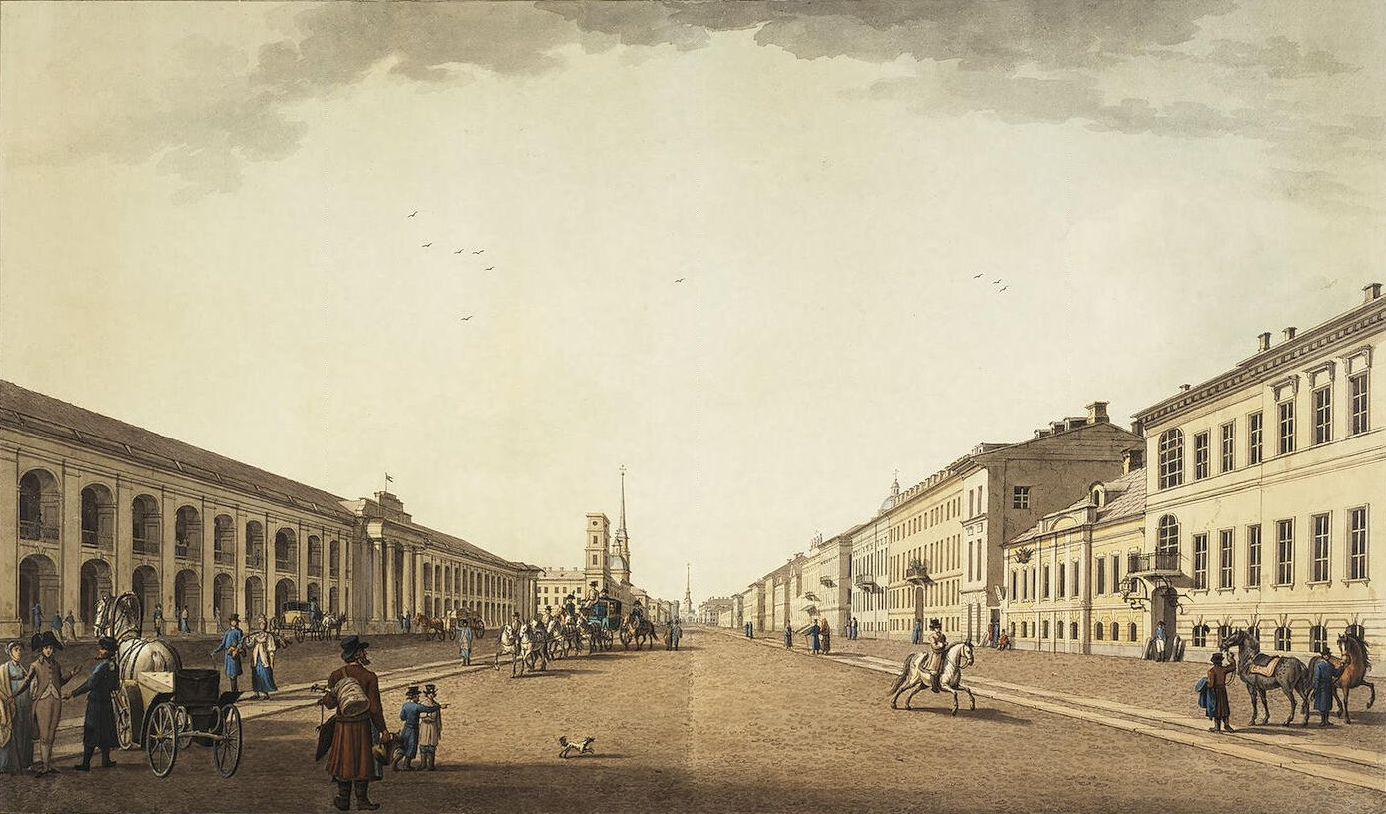
B. Pa. Nevsky Prospect near Gostiny Dvor. 1799

The new urban planning commission headed by the architect Andrey Kvasov, which appeared in 1762, decided to improve the center of the capital, to streamline its development. Stone houses up to 6 fathoms (about 13 meters) high were to be erected along the Neva perspective, in a line, "with one continuous facade". Intensive construction began, primarily on previously empty plots and on the site of demolished wooden houses. The height of the buildings increased to two or three floors, and classicism replaced the baroque. One of the first such samples is Chicherin House built on the site of the demolished wooden Winter Palace of Elizabeth, at the corner of Nevsky and Moika near the Police Bridge. On the left side of the avenue from the Admiralty to Bolshaya Morskaya Street and between the present Sadovaya Street and Anichkov Bridge, previously empty quarters in the second half of the 18th century were built up with philistine houses according to "exemplary" projects developed by Kvasov ... Two such houses, No. 8 and No. 10, built in the 1760s, have survived to this day. Various churches of different faiths appear, the construction of which was carried out on the left side. In 1780, Saint Catherine's Armenian Church appeared, according to the project of the architect Yury Felten, and in 1783 – Catholic Church of Saint Catherine according to the project Jean-Baptiste Vallin de la Mothe and Antonio Rinaldi. Each of these churches stands in the back of the block, in front of them are small courtyards, which are framed on both sides by two residential buildings facing the red line. In the second half of the 18th century, commercial enterprises began to appear on the main street of the capital. In the 1730s, a wooden predecessor to the modern Gostiny Dvor appeared. One-story squat benches under a common high roof, with an open gallery in front of them, stretched along the avenue. By a decree of Empress Elizabeth Petrovna of 1748, it was decided to replace the wooden building with a stone one at the expense of merchants according to the project of the architect Rastrelli, which was later replaced by the project of Jean-Baptiste Vallin de la Mothe in the style of classicism. The Gostiny Dvor was built from 1761 to 1785, indented from the red line, which gave a good view of the building from afar. Other stone trading structures appeared nearby, for example, the Silver Rows, which opened in 1787. Nearby, architect Giacomo Ferrari erected City Duma building with a tower at the corner with Nevsky Prospekt.

By the end of the 18th century, both sides of the highway beyond the Fontanka were almost built up. In the place where the metro station "Ploschad Vosstaniya" is now located, in 1765, according to the project of the architect Fyodor Demertsov Znamenskaya Church appeared. On the site of the current Oktyabrskaya Hotel since 1743, the Elephant Dvor was located, where elephants were housed, donated by the Persian shah the royal court. Later on this place was a hunter's yard with a wooden Ober-Jaegermeister's house Further on the left side was the "new carriage row" – stone sheds where you could buy carriages, Strollers, sleighs and other carriages. On the right side in the so-called "carts" sold old carts, harness, as well as other goods "simple needs for each household." In this part, and before the Lavra, the Nevskaya perspective did not look like a parade. By the end of the 18th century, the formation of the ensemble of the Alexander Nevsky Lavra was completed. In 1790, Trinity Cathedral was built according to the project of Ivan Starov. According to his designs, a round square was created in front of the entrance to the Lavra, bounded on the southern side by a curved stone fence, with the Gate Church in the center. The entrance to the square from the side of the avenue was designed by two two-story houses (now No. 179 and No. 190).

=== 19th and early 20th centuries ===
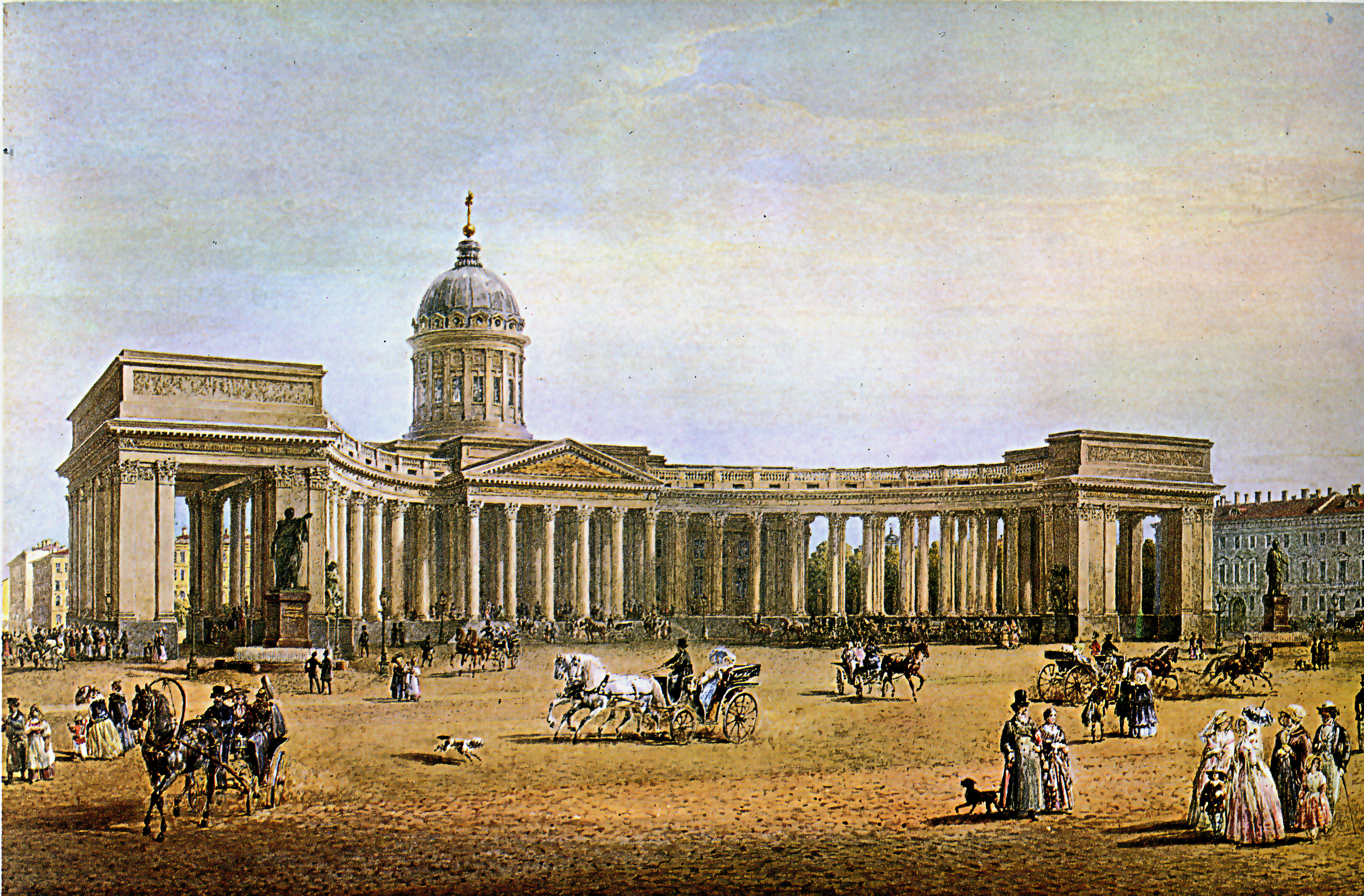
Colonnade of the Kazan Cathedral, in front of which are the monuments to Kutuzov and Barclay de Tolly; Vasily Sadovnikov, watercolor, 1837

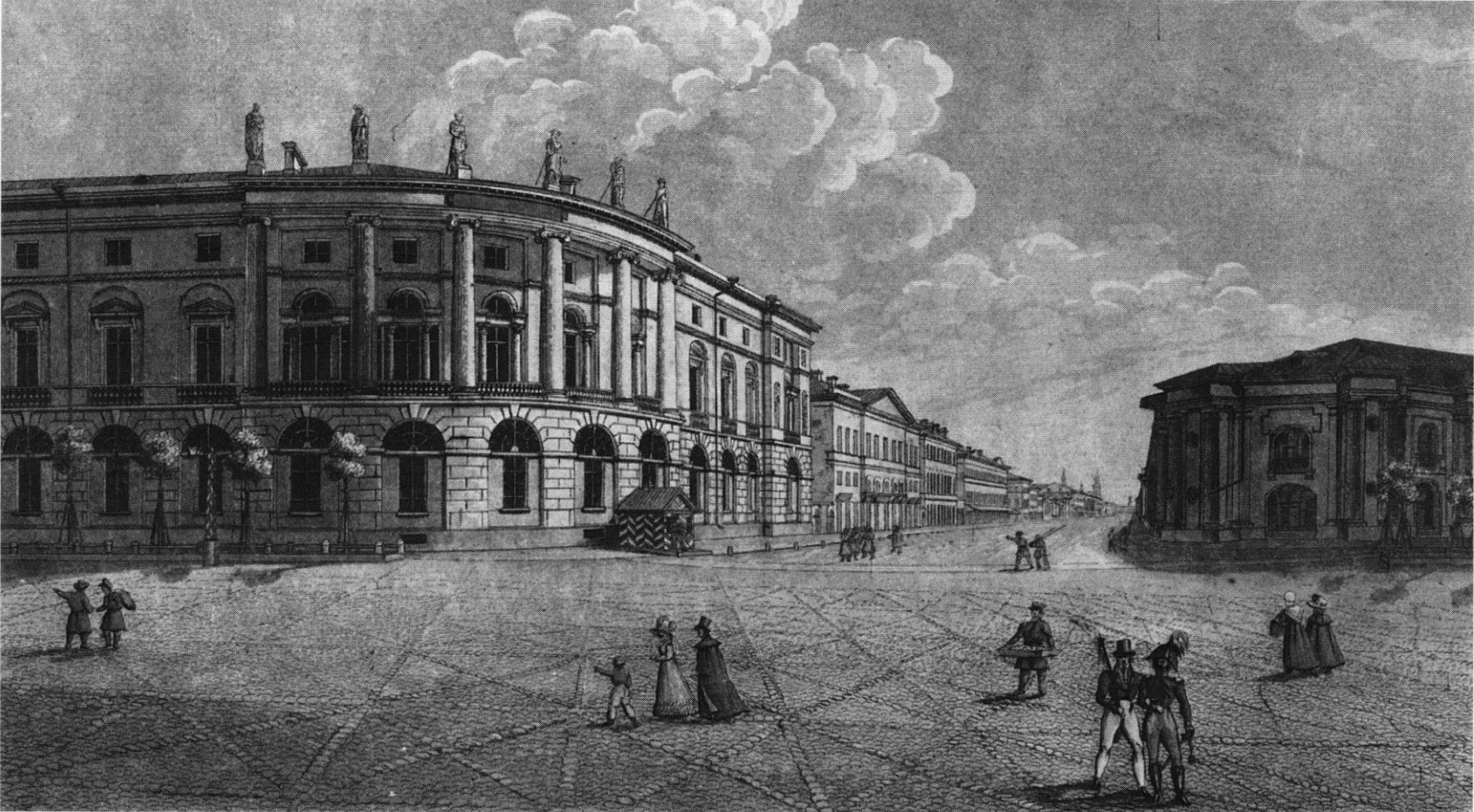
View of the building of the Imperial Public Library, Sadovaya Street and Gostiny Dvor 1800s

The final design of Nevsky Prospekt as an avenue-ensemble took shape in the first third of the 19th century. At this time, the masters of high classicism were creating. In 1799, a competition was announced for the construction of a cathedral on the site of the Church of the Nativity of the Virgin, which was won by the former serf of the Stroganov counts, Andrey Voronikhin. Kazan Cathedral was built from 1801 to 1811 and was consecrated on 15 September 1811, and in 1813 was buried under its vaults Field Marshal Mikhail Kutuzov. On 29 December 1837, the opening of monuments to Kutuzov and Barclay de Tolly to the generals Michael Andreas Barclay de Tolly and Mikhail Kutuzov on the square in front of the cathedral, created by the sculptor Boris Orlovsky.

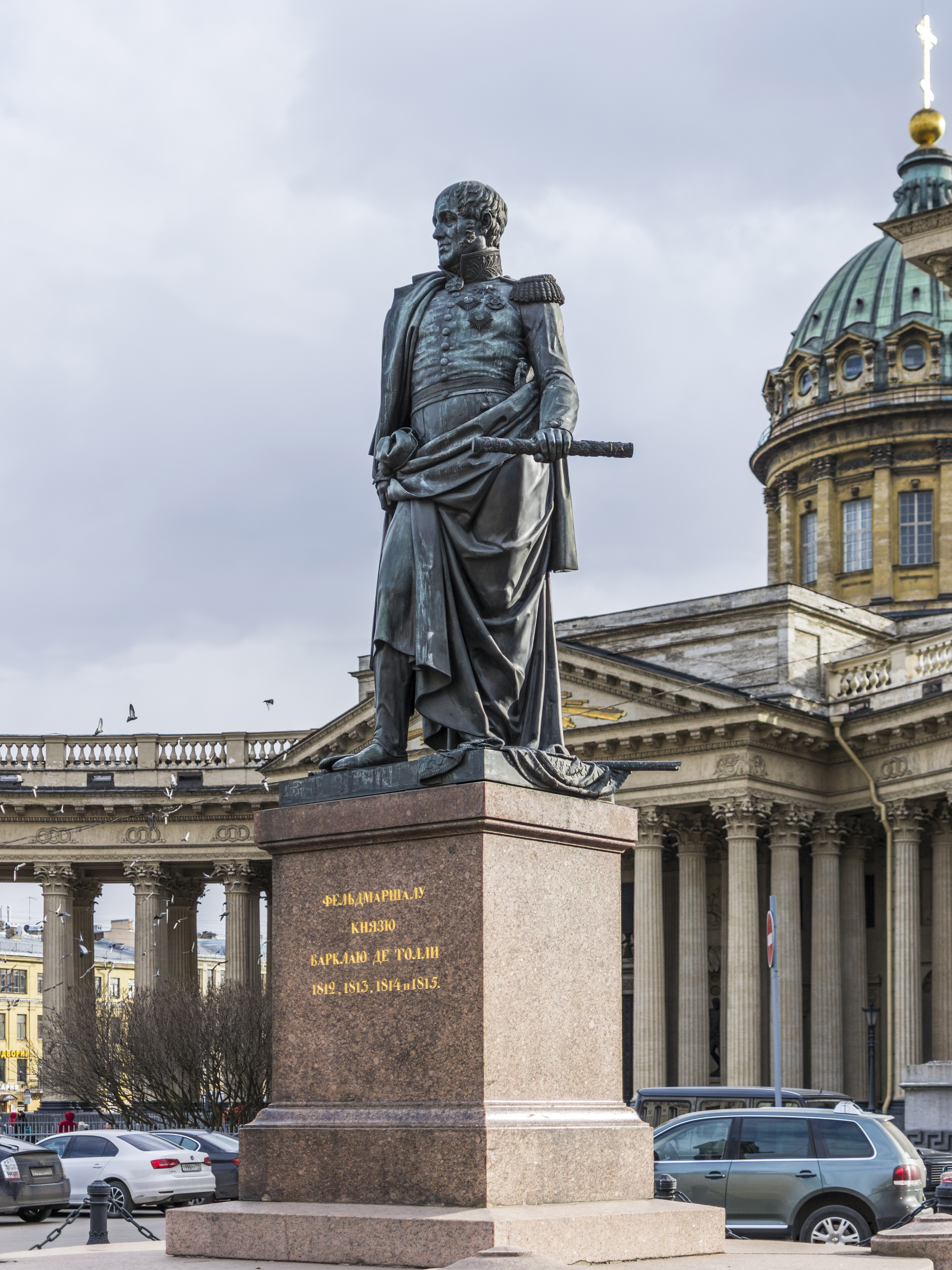
Statue of Barclay de Tolly in front of the city's Kazan Cathedral by Boris Orlovsky

In 1806–23, the Admiralty was rebuilt. At the same time, work was underway to improve the surrounding areas. In 1816–1818, a boulevard into three alleys was laid out on the site of a moat and a rampart. At the same time, ensembles appeared, designed by architect Carlo Rossi. The ensemble Palace Square connects to Nevsky Prospekt through the Triumphal Arch General Staff Building. Another Rossi ensemble at Arts Square connects with the main highway, Mikhailovskaya Street. The third ensemble, Ostrovsky Square, is open to Nevsky Prospekt and is an integral part of it. The first buildings of the ensemble appeared in 1816–18, two light pavilions with sculptures of warriors in armor, connected by a fence of strict design. In 1828–32, Rossi added a huge (90 meters long) new building to the building of the Public Library, creating a harmonious whole structure. At the same time, the Alexandrinsky Theater was being built at the back of the square. The theater building was one of the best for its time in terms of planning, stage equipment and skill of external and internal decoration.

In the 1830s, artist Vasily Sadovnikov made a series of lithographs depicting both sides of Nevsky Prospekt from Admiralteyskaya Square to Anichkov Bridge, known as the "Panorama of Nevsky Prospekt" (1830–1835). Made in watercolors, almost 16 meters long, it was translated into lithographic stone and published by A. M. Prevost in a series of 30 sheets.

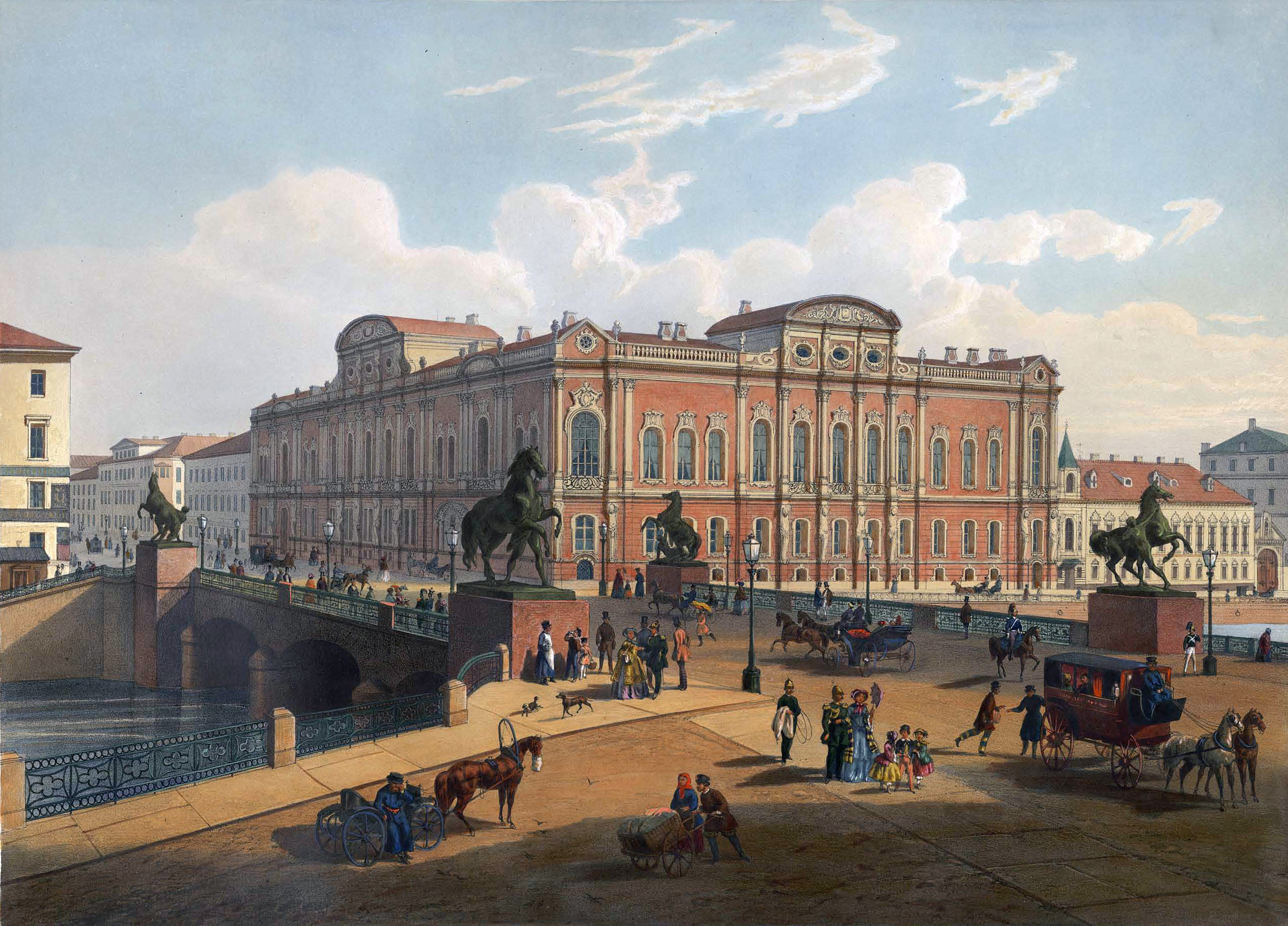
View from the Anichkov bridge to the Beloselsky-Belozersky palace (1850s)

By order of Emperor Paul I in 1800, two boulevards were created along Nevsky Prospekt in the section from Moika to Fontanka. In 1802–1803 they were replaced by one boulevard of lindens, designed by the architect I. E. Stamov by garden masters F. Lyamin and M. Prokopin. The level of the boulevard became higher than the pavement; stepped slopes were added opposite bridges and cross streets. Two years later, the boulevard next to the Kazan Cathedral under construction was liquidated, and in 1819 it was completely abandoned in the middle of the avenue, replacing it with ordinary plantings of trees along the new granite sidewalks of the avenue. Landings were interrupted at the Catherine Canal and cross streets. The entire row planting existed until 1841, when by order of the emperor Nicholas I it was liquidated, all trees were transplanted into Summer Garden. Ordinary plantings were restored in 1897 on the sites in front of the Kazan Cathedral (liquidated two years later in connection with the construction of the square) and Gostiny Dvor.

In 1832, the pavement on the avenue was replaced with a paved one butts – with hexagonal wooden blocks. This type of end pavement, invented by engineer V.P. Guryev, was first used here, then became widespread in many cities Europe and America. The side paving provided a soft and quiet ride and existed on Nevsky Prospekt until 1924, when the asphalt was replaced. In 1806, one of the first metal bridges was thrown across the Moika – Police Bridge designed by V. I. Hesse. Before that, the Moika was clad in granite. By 1841, the Anichkov Bridge was rebuilt: it was expanded, four granite towers were removed, a cast-iron lattice and horse groups on the theme of taming a horse by a man, created according to the project of the sculptor Peter Clodt. By the middle of the 19th century, Nevsky Prospekt became one of the most comfortable streets. Poor people gathered at the corner of Nevsky and Vladimirsky Prospekt for hiring daily workers, who christened this place "a lousy stock exchange". With the distance from the Fontanka, the volume and height of the houses decreased. On the first floors, often in semi-dark rooms, there were cheap entertainments such as Puppet Theater or wax rooms. The closer to Znamenskaya Square, the more often you come across wooden houses with large yards and vegetable gardens. And the so-called Staro-Nevsky Prospekt with low wooden houses, fences and vast vacant lots looked completely out of the blue. The construction fever in the second half of the 19th century changed the situation. eclecticism came to replace classicism in architecture. Such structures include the Beloselsky-Belozersky Palace, designed by architect Andrei Stackenschneider in 1846–48 at the corner with the Fontanka. It was the last private palace on Nevsky to be built. During this period, apartment buildings were built on the avenue. Flats or apartments were rented out for profit. The first floors overlooking the avenue were occupied by shop windows, for example at the Optical-mechanical workshop "Oscar Richter". New types of shops appeared on the avenue, which began to be called "passages", the most famous of which was opposite the Gostiny Dvor. The building was designed by architect R.A. Zhelyazevich between 1846 and 1848. Bank buildings have become a common type of specialized structure. House number 62, built in 1896–98 for St. Petersburg-Azov Commercial Bank by architect B.I. Girshovich. In 1874, Alexandrovsky Garden was solemnly opened on the site of Admiralty Square, and over time, its overgrown trees covered the facade of the Admiralty building. In the center of Alexandrovskaya Square in 1873, a monument to Empress Catherine ΙΙ was opened, around which a garden was laid out and tall trees were planted. And today the square is like a large green area, which has occupied almost all the free space, leaving small driveways along the Public Library and the Rossi pavilions. The square near the Kazan Cathedral, which appeared at the end of the 19th century, is decorated in a more tactful style – lawns, bushes and a small fountain in the center.

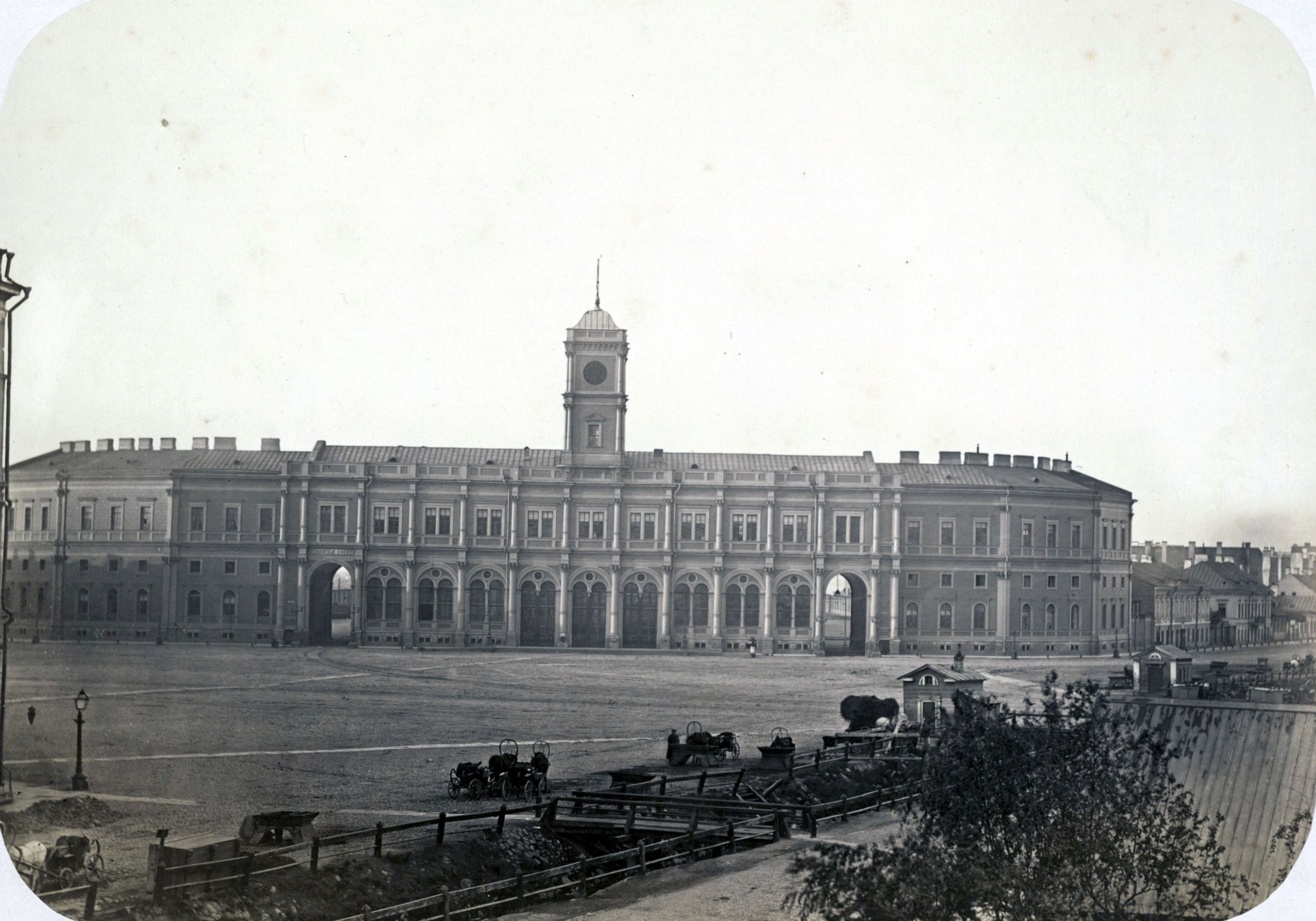
Nikolaevsky railway station building. Ligovsky Canal in the foreground Photo 1860s

The only square of Nevsky Prospekt, formed during the period of capitalist development, is Znamenskaya Square. Its formation was associated with the appearance in 1851 of the railway from St. Petersburg to Moscow and the construction of the building Nikolaevsky railway station at the corner with Ligovsky canal designed by the architect Konstantin Thon. On the contrary, in the early 1850s, the building of one of the largest in the city Severnaya Hotel was built by the architect A.P. Gemilian. The other two sides of the square were built up with "tenement houses" and hotels. As a result, the area got the shape trapezoid. In 1909, Equestrian monument to the Emperor Alexander III was erected in the center. The history of public transport in St Petersburg began on Nevsky Prospekt. On 27 August 1863, route 1 horse-drawn railway was opened from Nikolaevsky (now Moscow) railway station past Palace Square to Old Saint Petersburg Stock Exchange and Rostral Columns. In the late 1880s, a steam railway was laid from Znamenskaya Square along Staro-Nevsky and further outside the city. The first run St. Petersburg land tram started in September 1907 from Alexandrovsky Garden, and on November 11 the first bus on the route Aleksandrovsky Sad – Baltiyskiy vokzal. After a long break under Soviet rule in 1926, bus traffic was resumed along the avenue along the route Uritskogo Square (Palace Square) – Zagorodny Avenue – square Uprising.

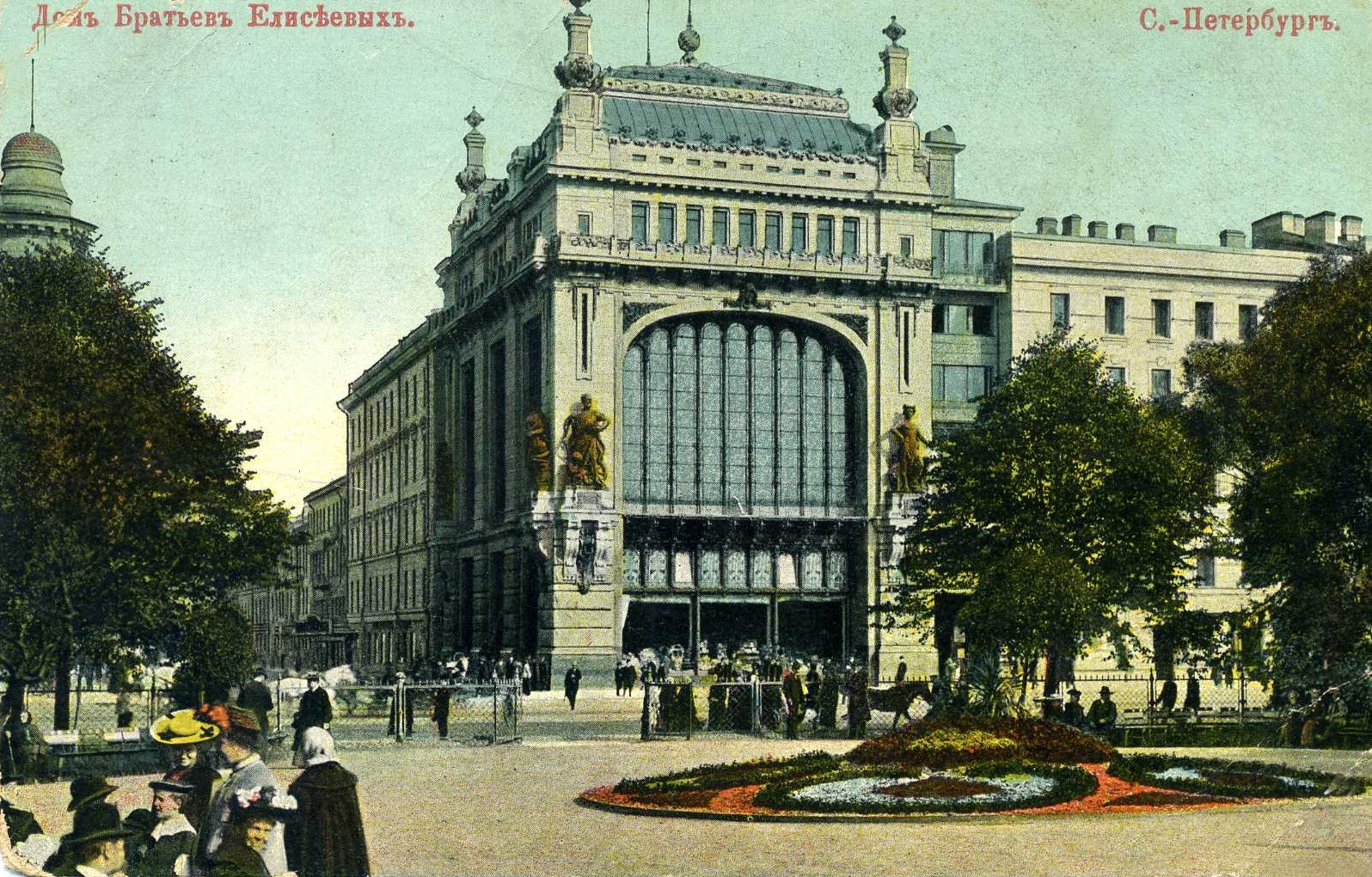
Eliseev brothers' store. View from the Catherine Garden Postcard from the 1910s

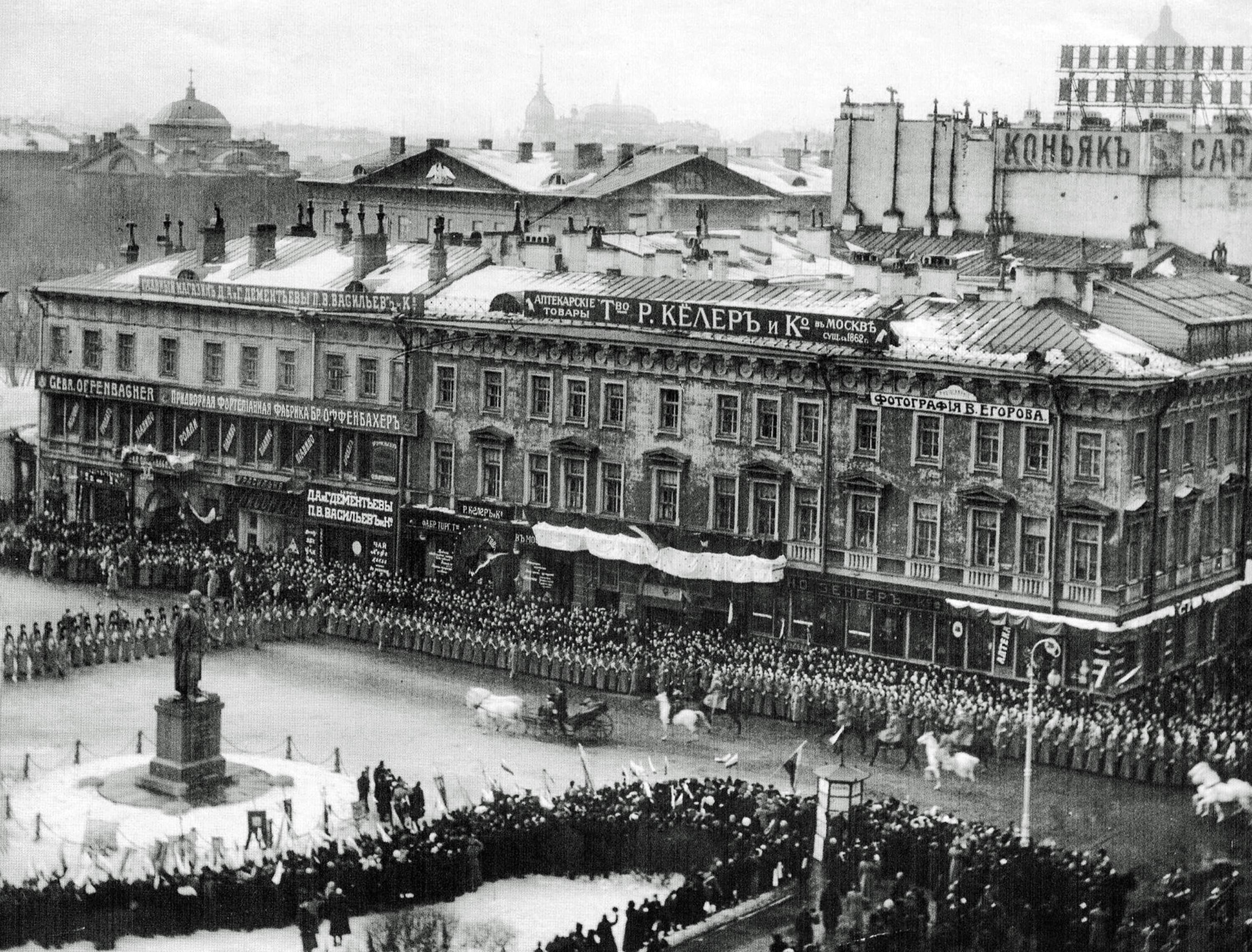
Kazan Cathedral House, Nevsky Prospect 25; celebrating the 300th anniversary of the Romanov dynasty; photo by Karl Bulla, 1913

By the beginning of the 20th century, modern had gained popularity. In this style in 1902–1904 was built the building of the trading house company "Singer" at the corner with the Catherine Canal according to the project of architect Pavel Suzor. In the same years (1903–1907), according to the project of the architect G. V. Baranovsky the building of another trade house – Eliseev Brothers (merchants) was erected. On the first floor, behind the mirrored windows, there is a huge trading hall, and on the second, a theater. Another building with a solid glazed facade appeared in 1911–1912, it was built by the architect M.S. Lalevich for the owner of a large company of fur products Mertens (house number 21). A little closer to the Admiralty at the corner of Malaya Morskaya Street according to the project of the architect M. M. Peretyatkovich a building appeared, built by order of the financier Wawelberg for the St. Petersburg Trade Bank (house number 7/9). In the 1910s, several more similar buildings were erected: the building of the commercial bank "Junker and Co." by the architect V. I. Van der Gucht (No. 12), building St. Petersburg Private Commercial Bank, designed by architect V.P. Zeidler (No. 1). As capitalism developed on Nevsky Prospekt, new offices and boards of various companies were opened, insurance and joint-stock companies, commissions. The largest enterprises of the city had their shops here. By 1917, 29 banks and credit institutions out of 64 existing then in Saint Petersburg, 10 out of 14 banking houses, 22 out of 29 bank offices were located on Nevsky Prospekt. Moreover, the largest banks of the country prevailed on Nevsky: Volga-Kama Commercial Bank (No. 38), Russo-Asiatic Bank (No. 62) and many others.

Nevsky Prospekt became the business and financial center of the city. As the city guidebooks describe the avenue, it has turned into a "life artery", "the center of splendor, luxury and grace of the capital". "Everything brilliant, precious, luxurious is combined here, which only St. Petersburg trade and industry can flaunt." The most famous and largest shopping center was Gostiny Dvor. By the end of the 19th century, gas lighting and even electric air heating large mirrored windows appeared in some shops. There were up to 300 retail premises, the staff was almost 5 thousand people. "Passage" numbered up to 60 shops. The trade turnover of stores on Nevsky was in the millions. Rich merchants had not only shops on the central street of the city, but also tenement houses and hotels. For example, in addition to four stores (No. 47, 59, 71, 76), the V.I. Solovyov trade partnership owned the Palkin restaurant at No. 47, Bolshaya Severnaya Hotel and its branch in house number 51. The advertisement could no longer fit on the first two floors and therefore sometimes occupied the entire facade of the building up to the roof. In clear weather on the sidewalks of the Nevsky metropolitan beau monde. At the service of wealthy citizens were fashionable hairdressers, tailors, the best photo studios, fashionable restaurants, cafes, pastry shops, and all kinds of clubs. By the end of the 19th century, the end pavement was extended to Znamenskaya Square. Many technical innovations were first tested on Nevsky. From April 17 (29) to May 2 (14), 1879, experiments on electric street lighting were carried out on Alexandria Square, organized by the partnership P.N. Yablochkova. At night, from 10 pm to midnight, the public was shown experiments of "instant extinguishing and ignition" of four electric lanterns out of 12. On the day of the end of the experiment, the monument to the Empress was illuminated with reflectors. On the Moika near the Police Bridge, the first power plant in St. Petersburg was mounted on a barge. On 30 December 1883, the avenue from Moika to Fontanka, the first in Russia, was illuminated electric incandescent lamps. Two years later, electricity appeared on the section from Fontanka to Znamenskaya Square. On Nevsky Prospekt in 1882, the first telephone exchange in Russia appeared, which was located in house No. 26. From the tower installed at the top, wires were stretched in all directions.

=== 21st century. Modern period ===
In the 1990s, houses Nos. 15, 55, 59, 68, 114 and 116 were completely dismantled. New buildings were erected in their place with a partial or complete reconstruction of the historical façade. The buildings were deliberately brought to accidents by the owners or were recognized as such illegally, the dismantling of buildings was carried out without permits. The appearance of some in the early 2010s was distorted due to the construction of attics (houses no. 3, 64).

From 1999 to 2004, a comprehensive reconstruction of Nevsky Prospekt from the Admiralty to Vosstaniya Square was underway: paving with granite slabs of sidewalks was carried out, communications and engineering networks were changed. In 2005–2006, the facades of almost all buildings were decorated with artistic lighting. In 2008, a lane for public transport was separated from the Admiralty to Vosstaniya Square. On the sidewalks from Vosstaniya Square to Alexander Nevsky Square, the asphalt pavement was replaced with a granite one

Nevsky Prospect is a venue for mass celebrations. On New Year, Victory Day (May 9) City Day (May 27) and other memorable dates, the avenue from Fontanka to Palace Square turns into a pedestrian zone. September 12 – on the Day of the Holy Faithful Prince Alexander Nevsky, along the main thoroughfare of the city there is a traditional religious procession from Kazan Cathedral to Alexander Nevsky Square

== Nevsky Prospect, 19th century. Engravings ==
Nevsky Prospect, XIX century. Engravings

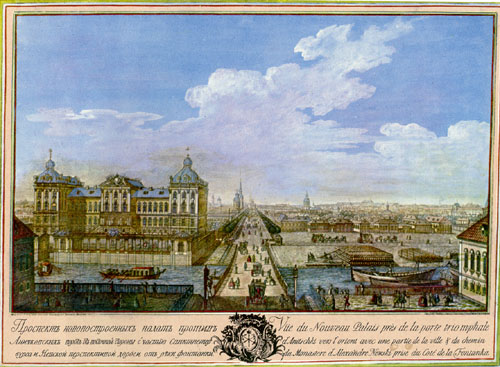
View of Nevsky Prospect and Anichkov Bridge, 1753

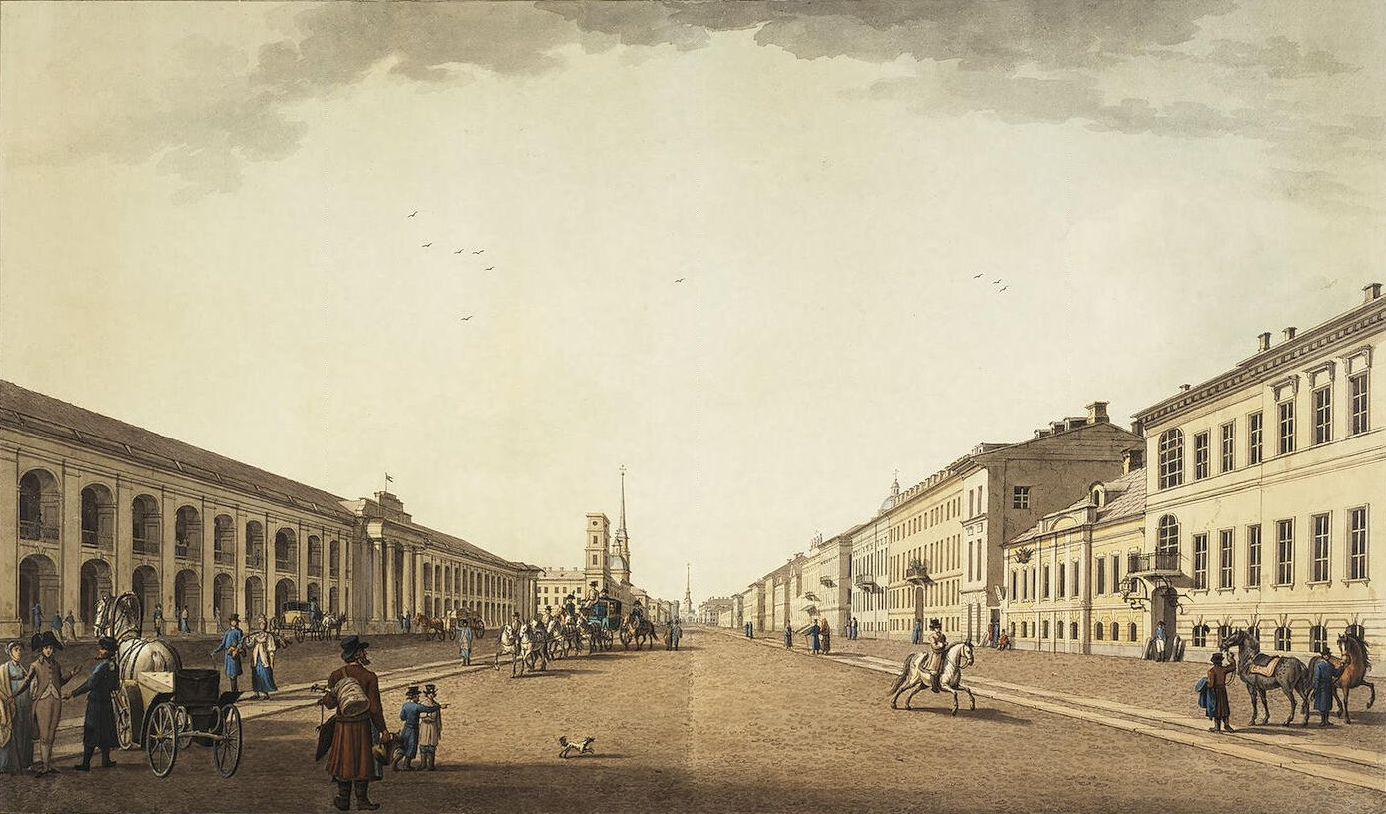
Nevsky Prospect near Gostiny Dvor, 1799. Printmaking (engraving) by Benjamin Patersen.

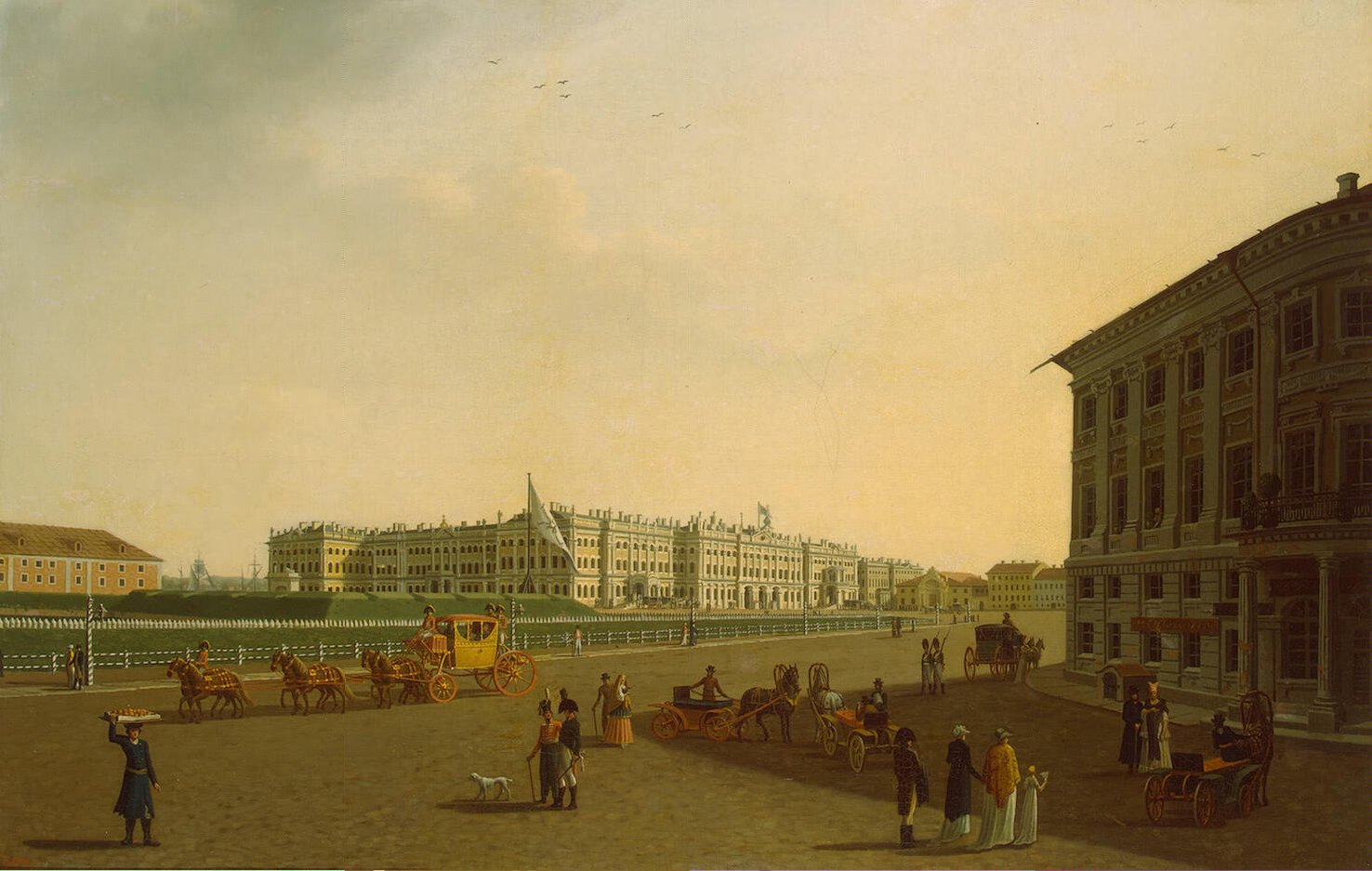
"View of the Palace Square and the Winter Palace from the beginning of Nevsky Prospect", 1801. Engraving by Benjamin Patersen.

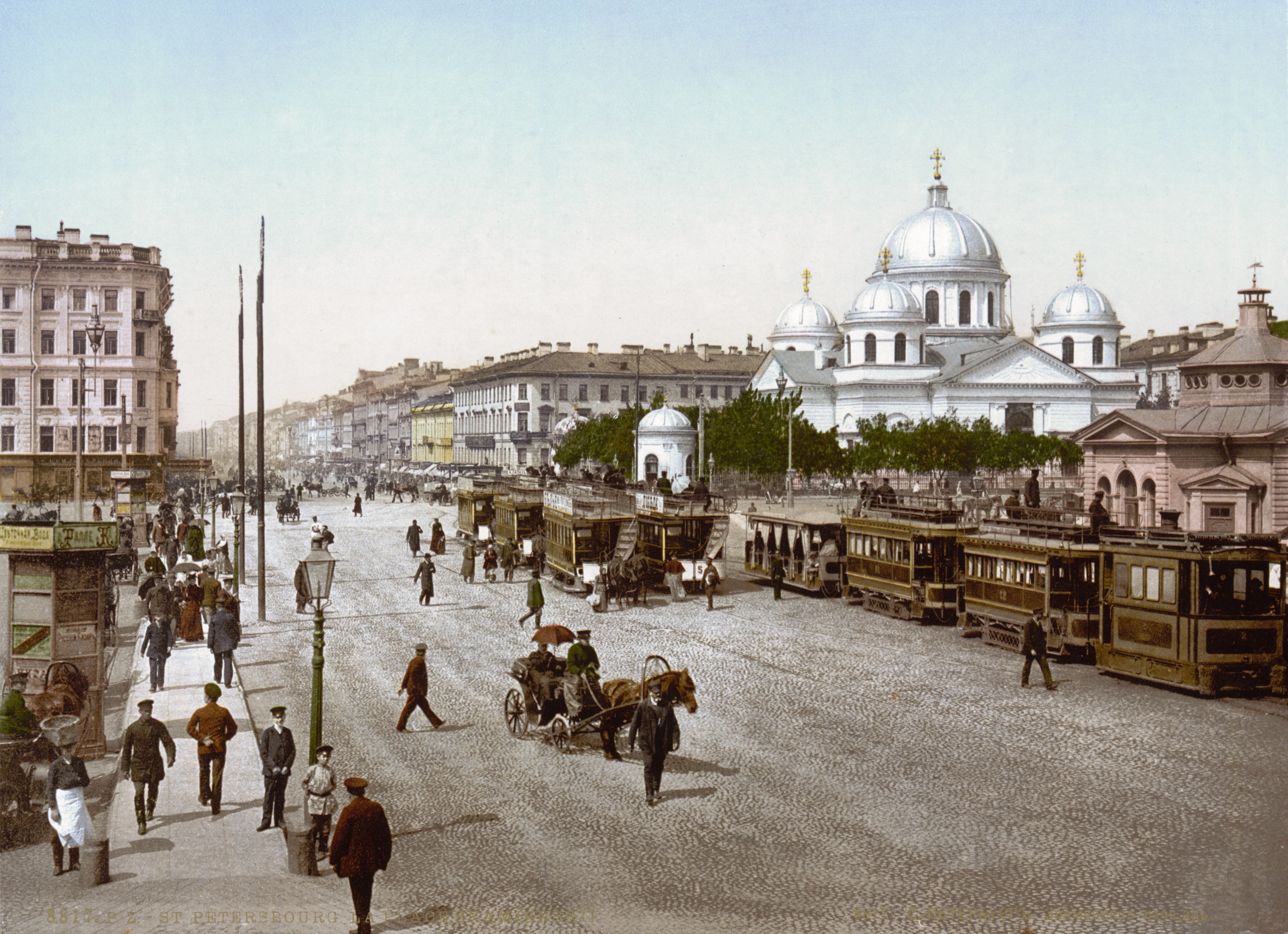
The avenue near the Nicholas Station, 1890s. Engraving by Benjamin Patersen.

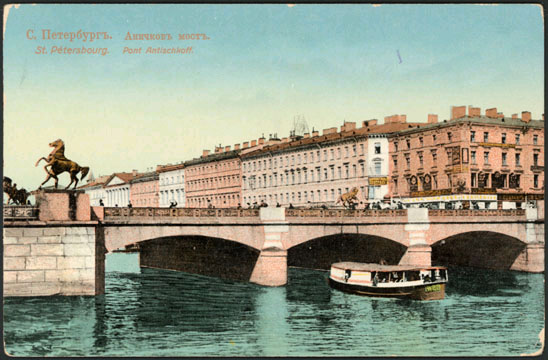
The Fontanka River at the Anichkov Bridge. 19th or early 20th century

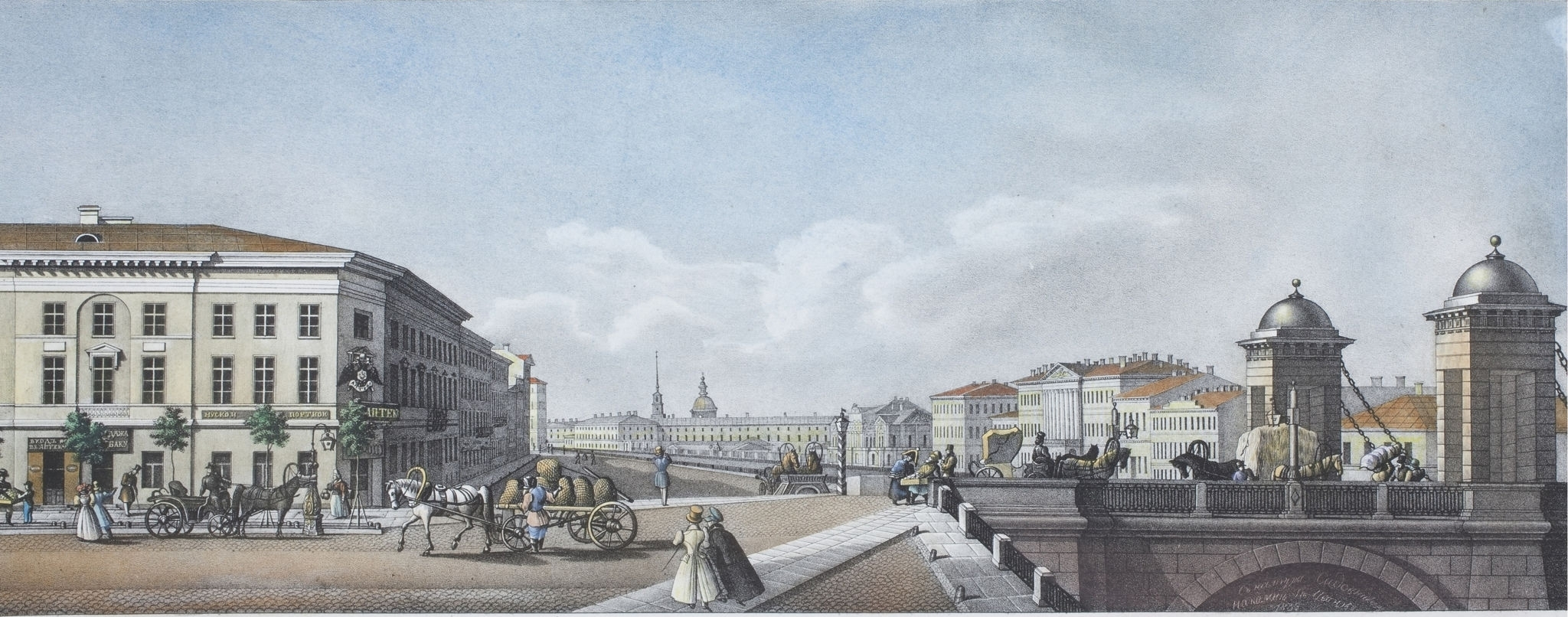
Panorama of Nevsky Prospect, 1830s. Engraving by Vasily Sadovnikov.

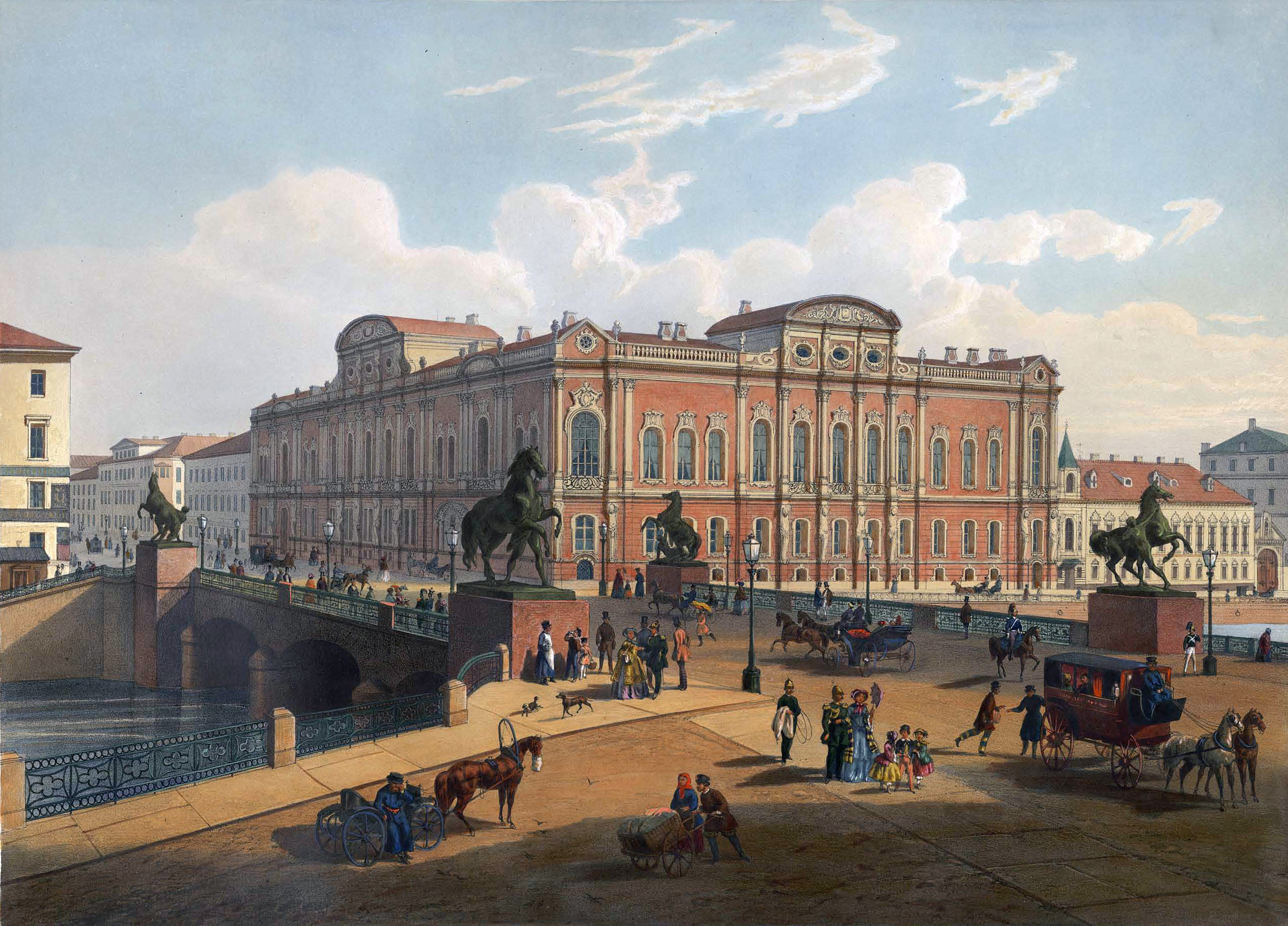
Anichkov Bridge and the Beloselsky-Belozersky Palace, 1850s. Engraving by Charlemagne.

== History of the name ==
=== 20th century ===
During the early Soviet years (1918–44) the name of Nevsky Prospect was changed, first and briefly to "Proletkult Street" (Ulitsa Proletkul'ta) in honor of that Soviet artistic organization. Following the demise of Proletkult already around 1920 the name was changed again, this time to "Avenue of the 25th of October", alluding to the day of the October Revolution: the name never took on in the daily language of the city's inhabitants who continued to use the pre-revolutionary name. During the siege of Leningrad (1941–1944) some walls on the north side of Nevsky Prospect were stencilled with the inscription "Citizens! During shelling this side of the street is the most dangerous", warning passers-by of the areas most at risk from German artillery bombardment. In 1962, the inscription was recreated on school building No. 210 on Nevsky Prospect through the initiative of poet Mikhail Dudin. The inscription, and other examples across the city, are considered war memorials and are frequently the site of commemorations of the siege. In January 2019 Governor of Saint Petersburg Alexander Beglov laid flowers at the inscription on Nevsky Prospect.

At the end of the siege of Leningrad, in January 1944, the name Nevsky Prospect was formally restored and has remained ever since.

== Significance ==
The Nevsky today functions as the main thoroughfare in Saint Petersburg. The majority of the city's shopping and nightlife takes place on or immediately off Nevsky Prospekt.

The street is served by the stations Admiralteyskaya, Nevsky Prospekt, Gostiny Dvor, Mayakovskaya, Ploshchad Vosstaniya and Ploshchad Alexandra Nevskogo I of Saint Petersburg Metro.

== Sightseeings of the Nevsky Prospekt ==
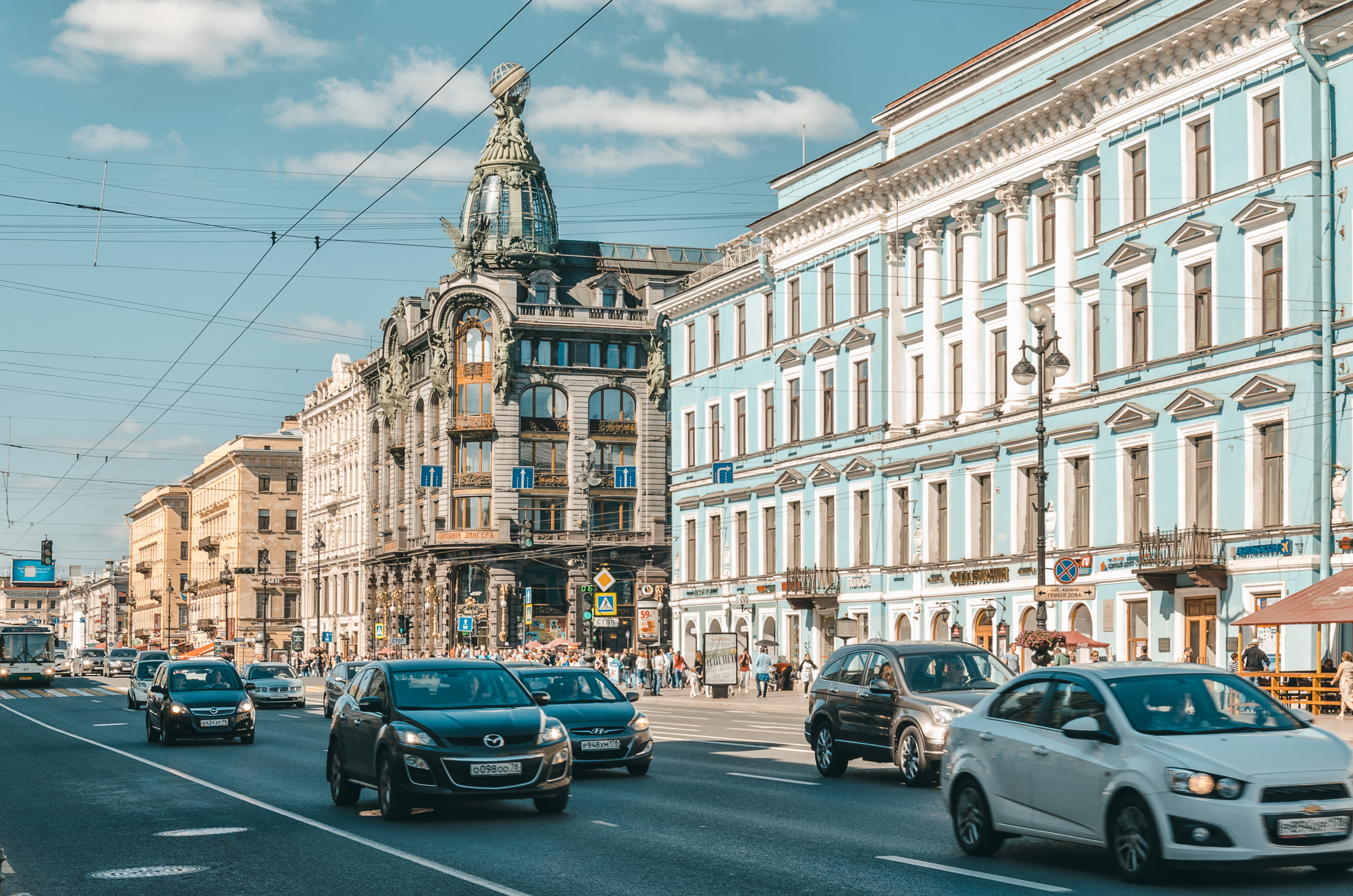
This is a photo of House of the company "Singer" (also known as "House of Books"), a cultural heritage object in Russia, located at the intersection of Nevsky Prospekt and the Griboyedov Canal, directly opposite the Kazan Cathedral. It is recognized as a historical and tourist landmark.

Major sights include the Rastrelliesque Stroganov Palace, the grand neoclassical Kazan Cathedral, the Art Nouveau Bookhouse (originally the Singer House), Elisseeff Emporium, half a dozen 18th-century churches, a monument to Catherine the Great, the Great Gostiny Dvor, the Passage, the Russian National Library, the Alexandrinsky Theatre, and the Anichkov Bridge with its horse statues. Nevsky Prospekt is a part of UNESCO World Heritage list.

Singer House

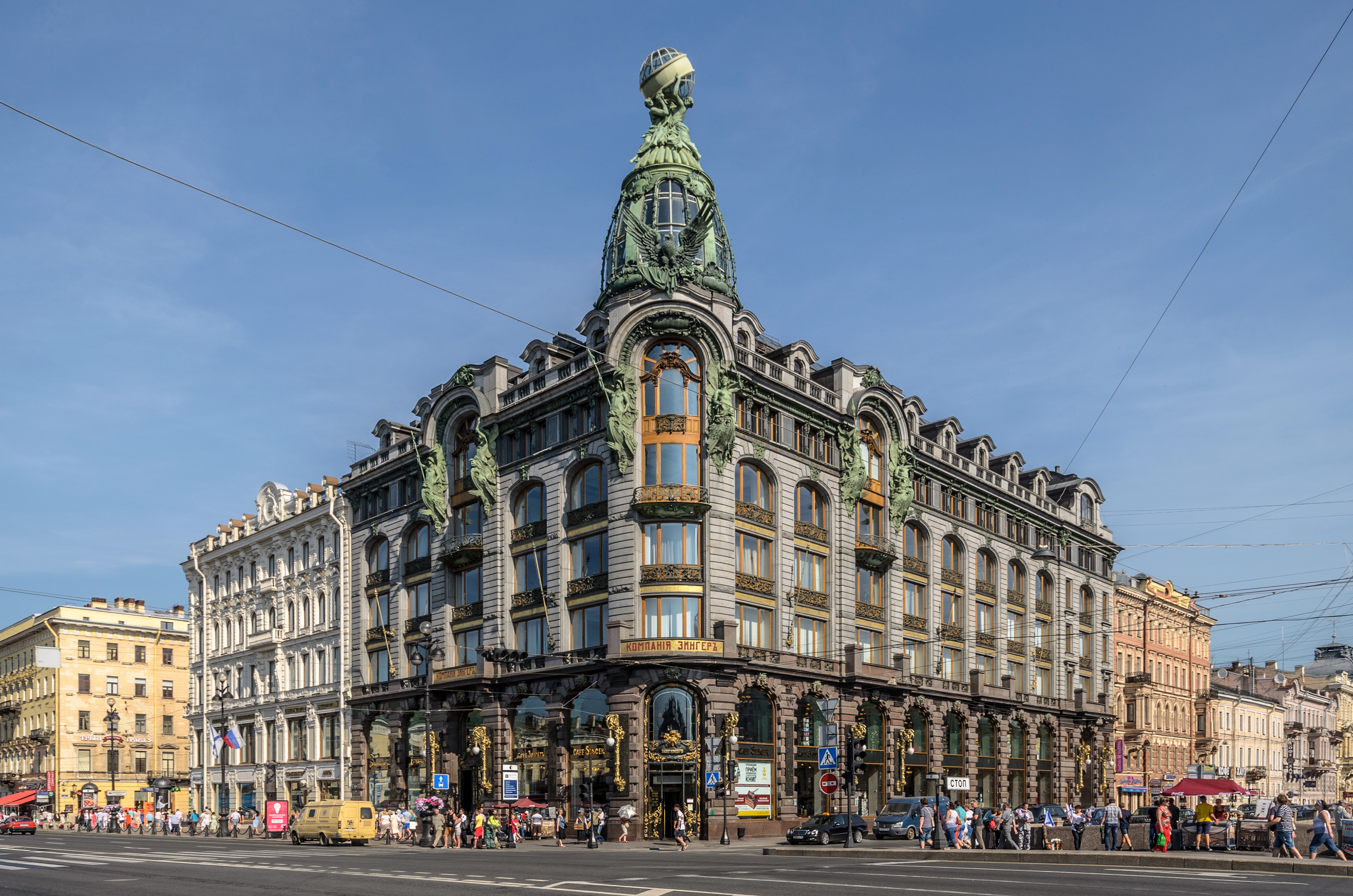
Frontal view of the Singer House, located at the Nevsky prospect

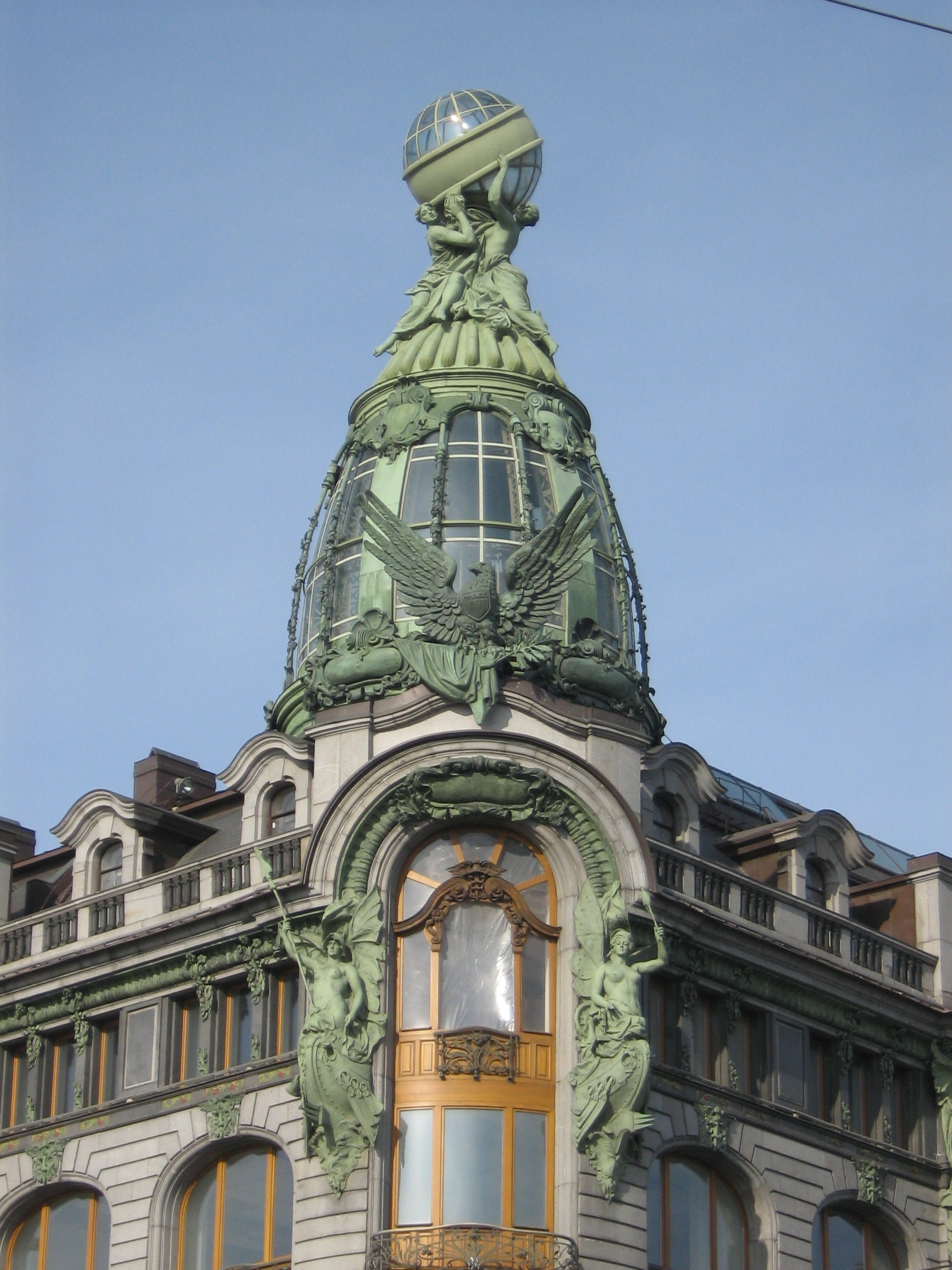
The tower with the globe on the top

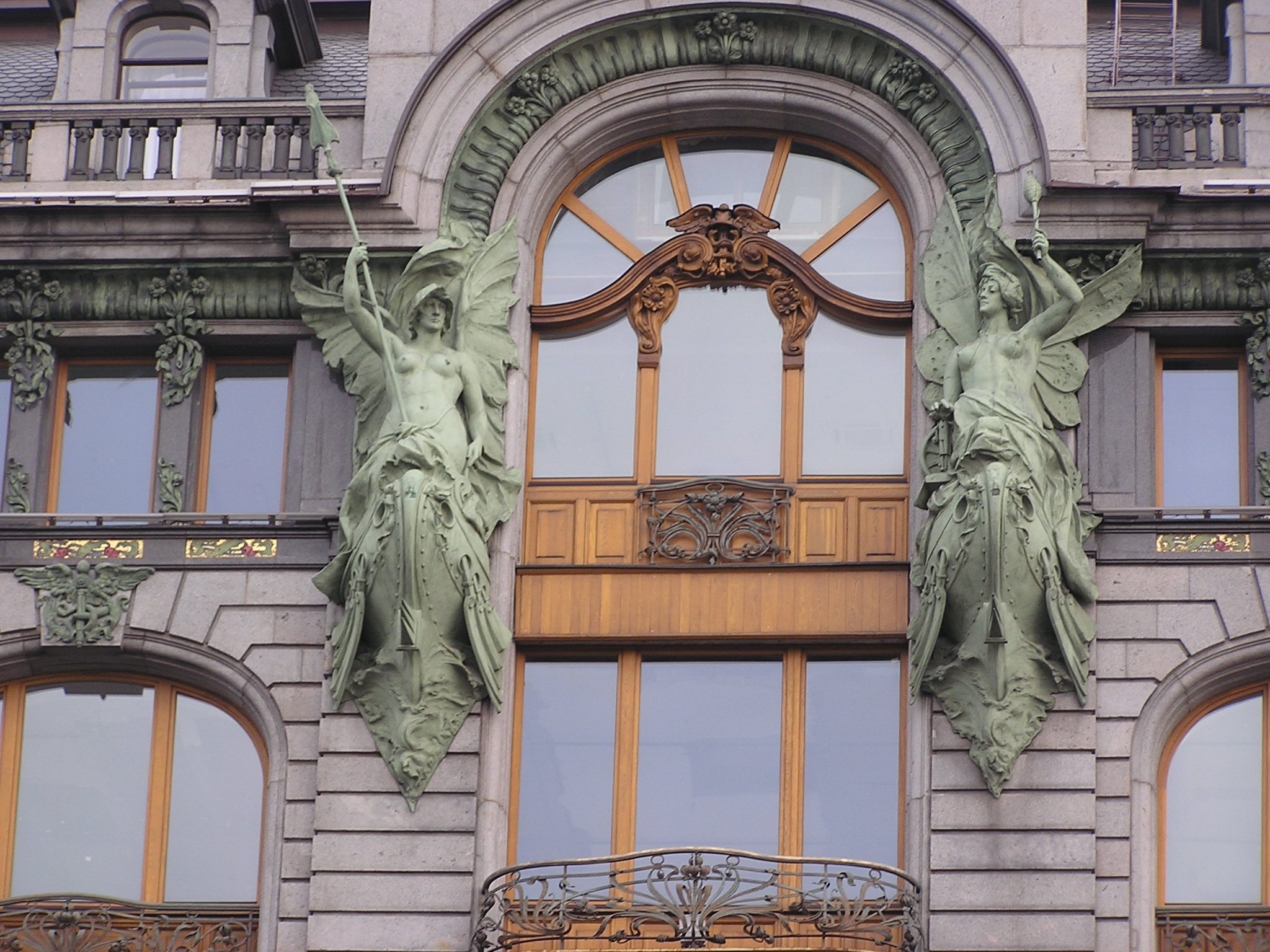
Sculptures on the facade
Anichkov Bridge

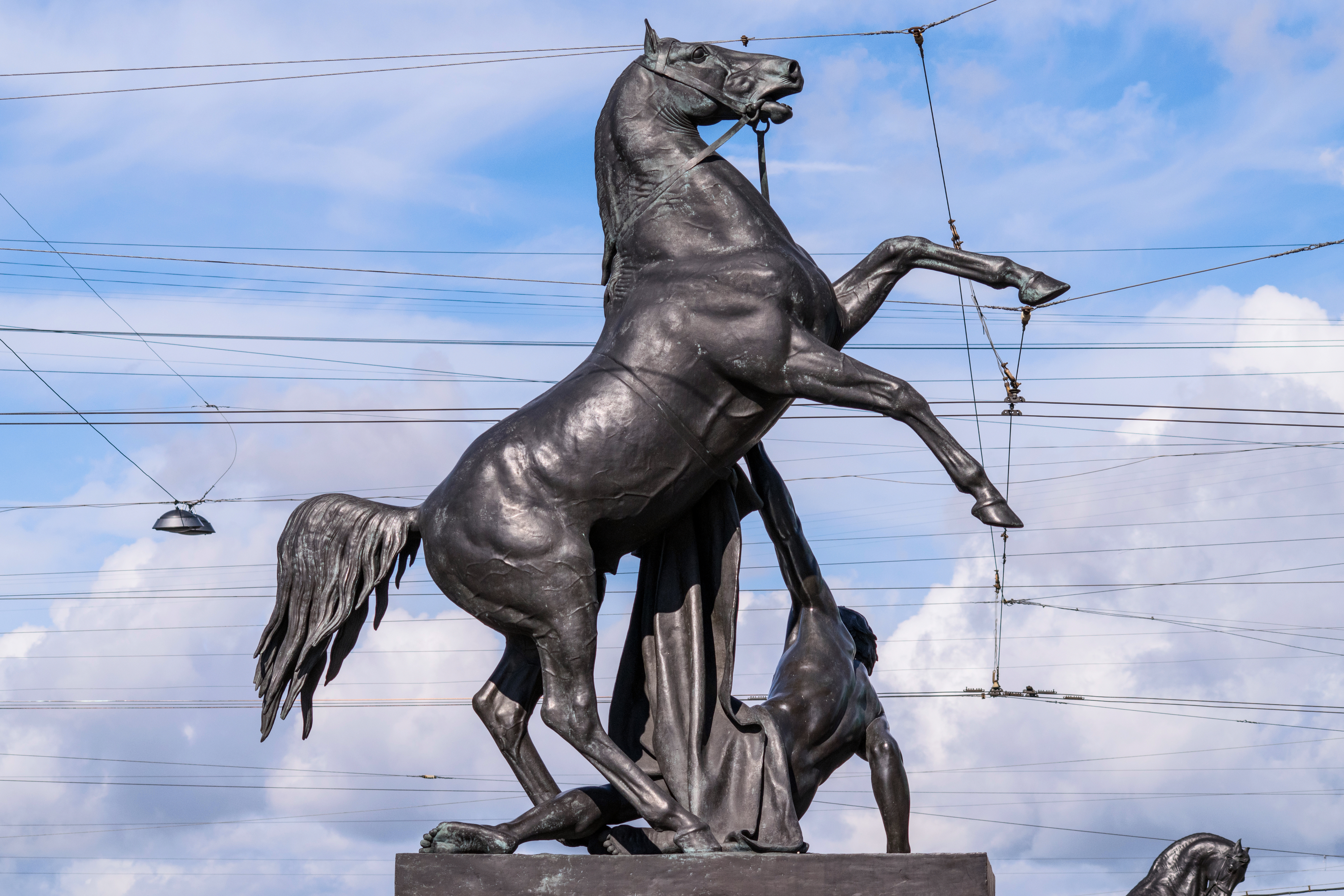
The Horse Tamers, on the Anichkov Bridge, designed by the Russian sculptor, Baron Peter Klodt von Jurgensburg. The silhouettes of the sculptural groups on high pedestals are so expressive that they ensured incredible success for this monument.

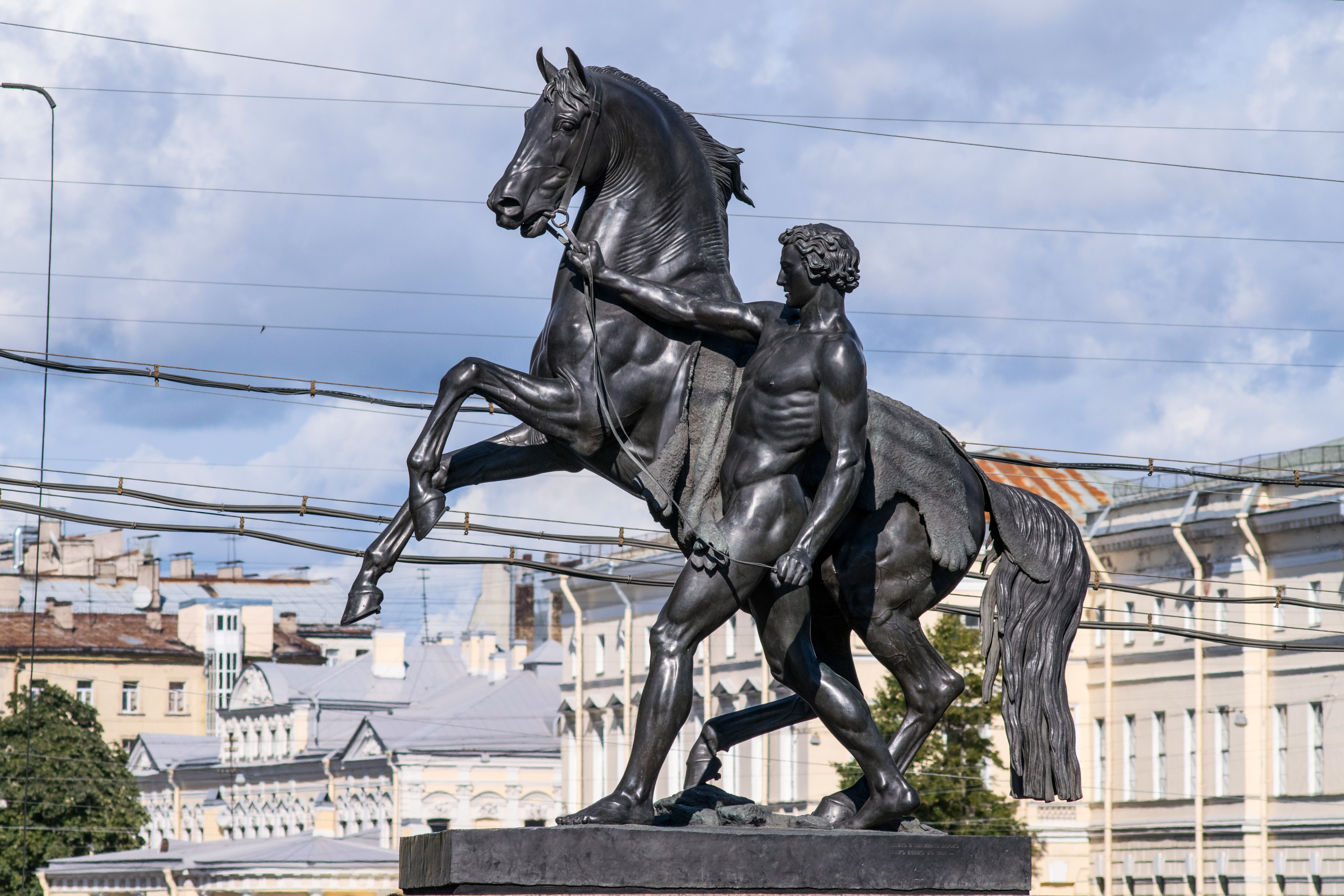
The Horse Tamers, on the Anichkov Bridge, designed by the Russian sculptor, Baron Peter Klodt von Jurgensburg. The silhouettes of the sculptural groups on high pedestals are so expressive that they ensured incredible success for this monument.

== Nevsky prospect in the Russian classic literature of the 19th century ==
Nikolai Gogol described the feverish life of the avenue in his story "Nevsky Prospekt", published in 1835. Fyodor Dostoevsky often employed Nevsky Prospekt as a setting in his works, such as Crime and Punishment (1866) and The Double: A Petersburg Poem (1846). The café-restaurant which the famous writers of the 19th-century Golden Age of the Russian literature frequented still remains as "Literary Cafe" on Nevsky Prospect.

Нет ничего лучше Невского проспекта, по крайней мере в Петербурге; для него он составляет всё. Чем не блестит эта улица — красавица нашей столицы! Я знаю, что ни один из бледных и чиновных её жителей не променяет на все блага Невского проспекта. Не только кто имеет двадцать пять лет от роду, прекрасные усы и удивительно сшитый сюртук, но даже тот, у кого на подбородке выскакивают белые волоса и голова гладка, как серебряное блюдо, и тот в восторге от Невского проспекта. А дамы! О, дамам ещё больше приятен Невский проспект. Да и кому же он не приятен? Едва только взойдешь на Невский проспект, как уже пахнет одним гуляньем. Хотя бы имел какое-нибудь нужное, необходимое дело, но, взошедши на него, верно, позабудешь о всяком деле. Здесь единственное место, где показываются люди не по необходимости, куда не загнала их надобность и меркантильный интерес, объемлющий весь Петербург.

— Excerpt from Nikolai Gogol's 1835 short story "Nevsky Prospekt".
Translation:

There is nothing better than Nevsky Prospect, at least in St. Petersburg; for the city, it is everything. How it shines– the beauty of our capital! I know that none of its pale and bureaucratic residents would exchange Nevsky Prospekt for any number of riches. Not only he who is twenty-five years old, with a wonderful mustache and an astonishingly tailored frock coat, but even someone with white hair popping out on their chin and a head as smooth as a silver dish is delighted with Nevsky Prospect. And the ladies! Oh, the ladies are even more pleased with Nevsky Prospect. And who doesn't like it? As soon as you climb onto Nevsky Prospekt, it already smells of promenades. One may have some necessary, indispensable business, but, having walked on to Nevsky Prospekt, you will surely forget about any sort of business at all. Here is the only place where people don't go out of necessity, where their needs and mercantile interest, which embraces the whole of Petersburg, has not driven them.

== See also ==
- List of upscale shopping districts
