= Vasily Sadovnikov =

Russian artist

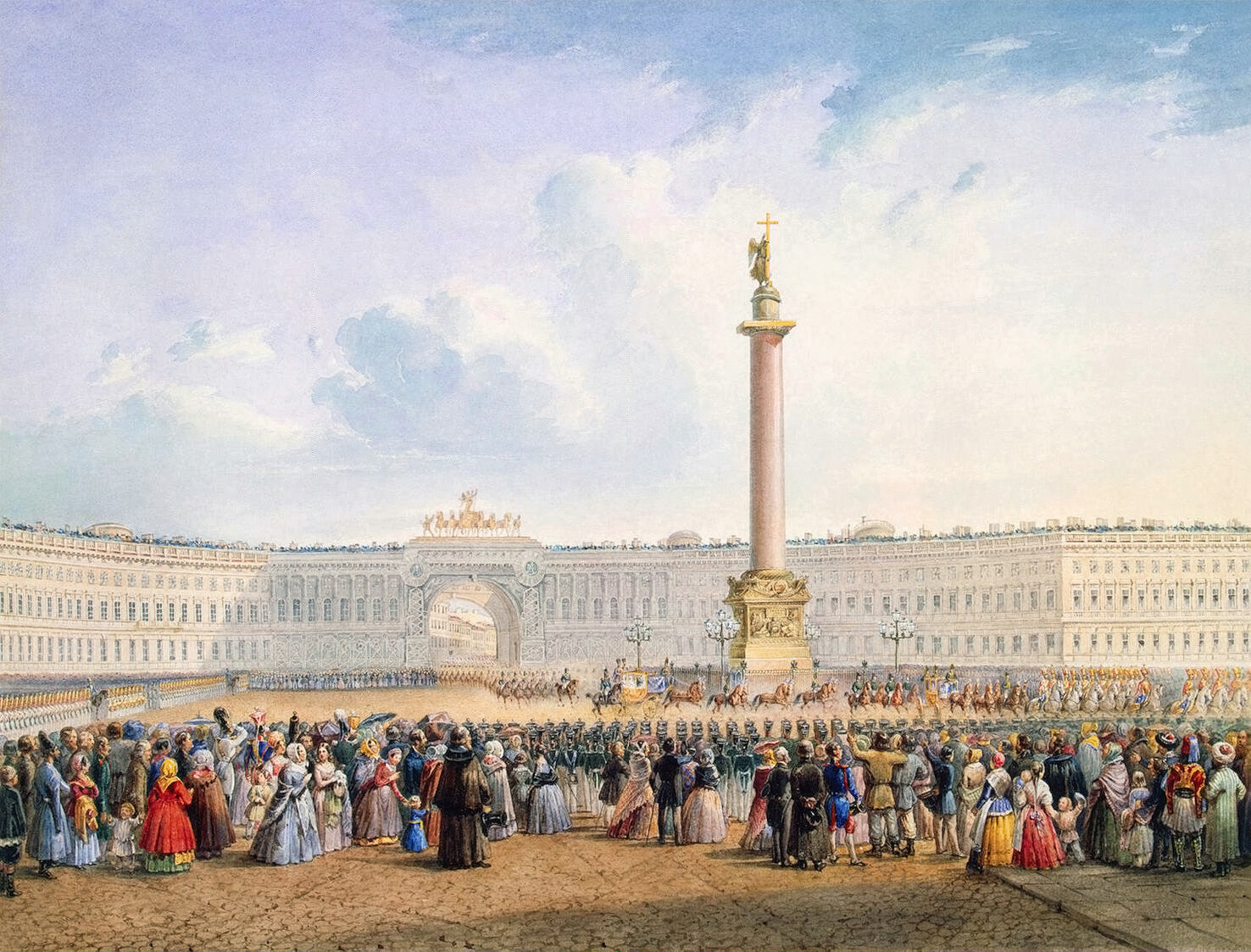
Watercolor of Palace Square, Saint Petersburg, (c. 1847), now in the Hermitage Museum

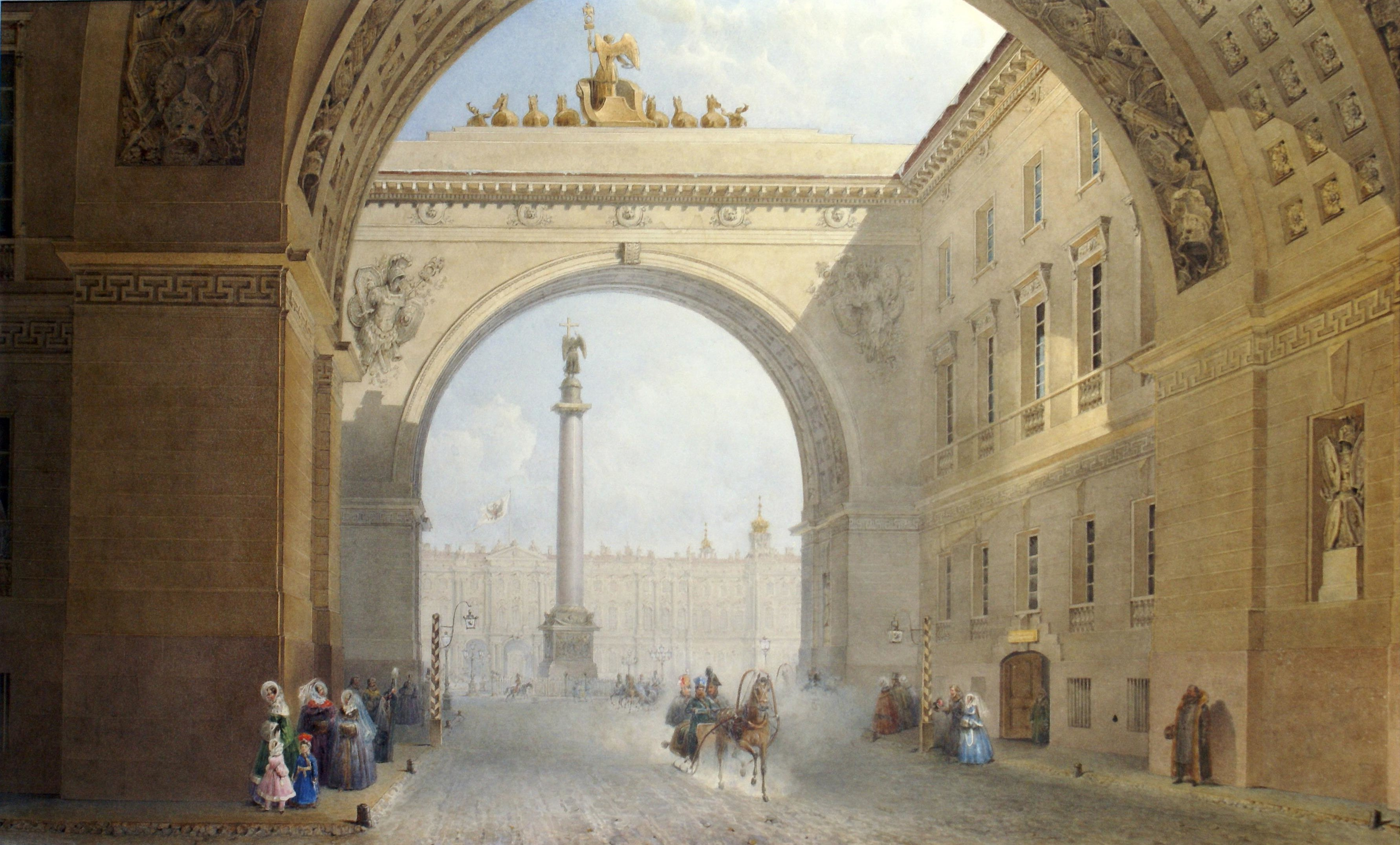
Watercolor of the arch at the General Staff Building, Saint Petersburg

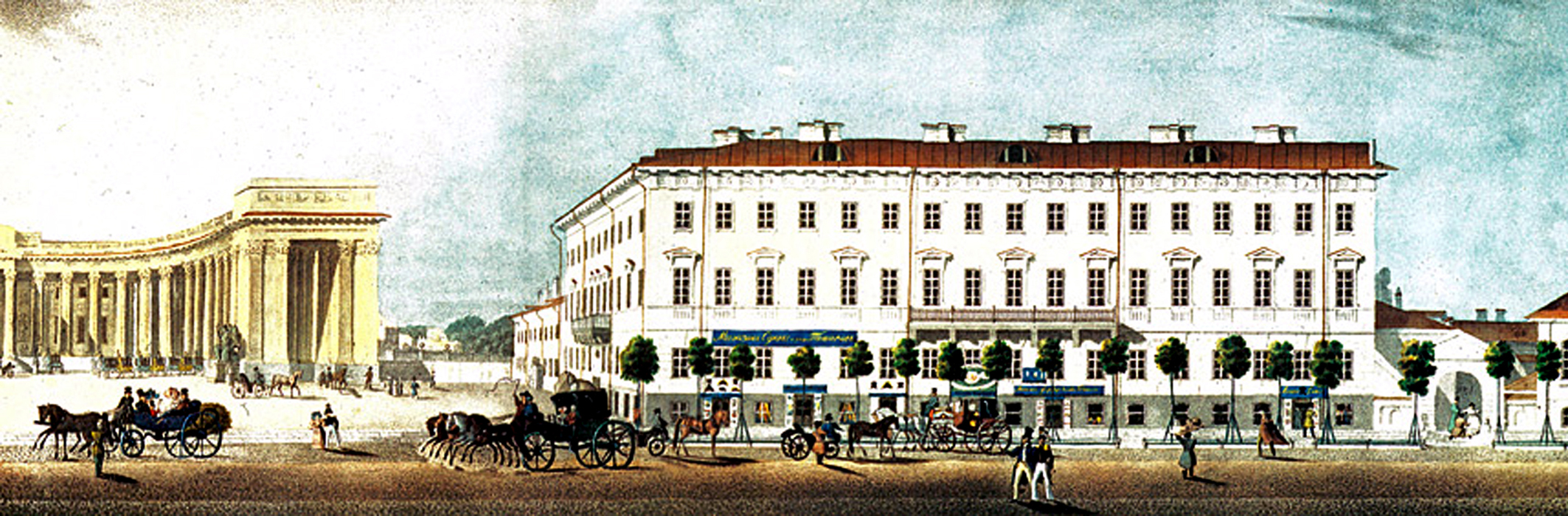
Kazan Cathedral House / Nevsky Prospect, 25. Lithograph 1830–1835

Vasily Semyonovich Sadovnikov (Russian: Василий Семёнович Садовников; 28 December [O.S. 16 December] 1800 – 10 March [O.S. 26 February] 1879) was a Russian painter, and a leading Russian master of perspective painting.

== Biography ==
Vasily Semenovich Sadovnikov was born in 1800 in Saint Petersburg.

Vasily's brother, Pyotr Sadovnikov, was the architect of the Stroganov and Golitsyn families. He started his professional training with Andrey Voronikhin, subsequently became a Member of Saint Petersburg Academy of Arts (1849).

He died in 1879 in Saint Petersburg and was buried at Mitrofanyevskoe Cemetery (now abolished).

== See also ==
- Vasily Tropinin, another painter who was born a serf.
- Andrey Voronikhin, an architect who was a serf.

== Sources ==
- Boglachev, Sergey. "Sadovnikov P.S. (1796–1877), architect". Encyclopaedia of St. Petersburg.
- Leikind, Oleg; Severyukhin, Dmitriy. "Sadovnikov V.S., (1800–1879), Artist". Encyclopaedia of St. Petersburg.
- Senkevitch, Tatiana (2014). "The Phantasmagoria of the City: Gogol's and Sadovnikov's Nevsky Prospect, St Petersburg". In Wrigley, Richard (ed.). The Flâneur Abroad: Historical and International Perspectives. Newcastle upon Tyne: Cambridge Scholars Publishing. pp. 166–204. ISBN 978-1-4438-6016-1.
