= Silver Rows =

Building in Saint Petersburg

Coordinates: 59°56′05″N 30°19′45″E

- Серебряные ряды
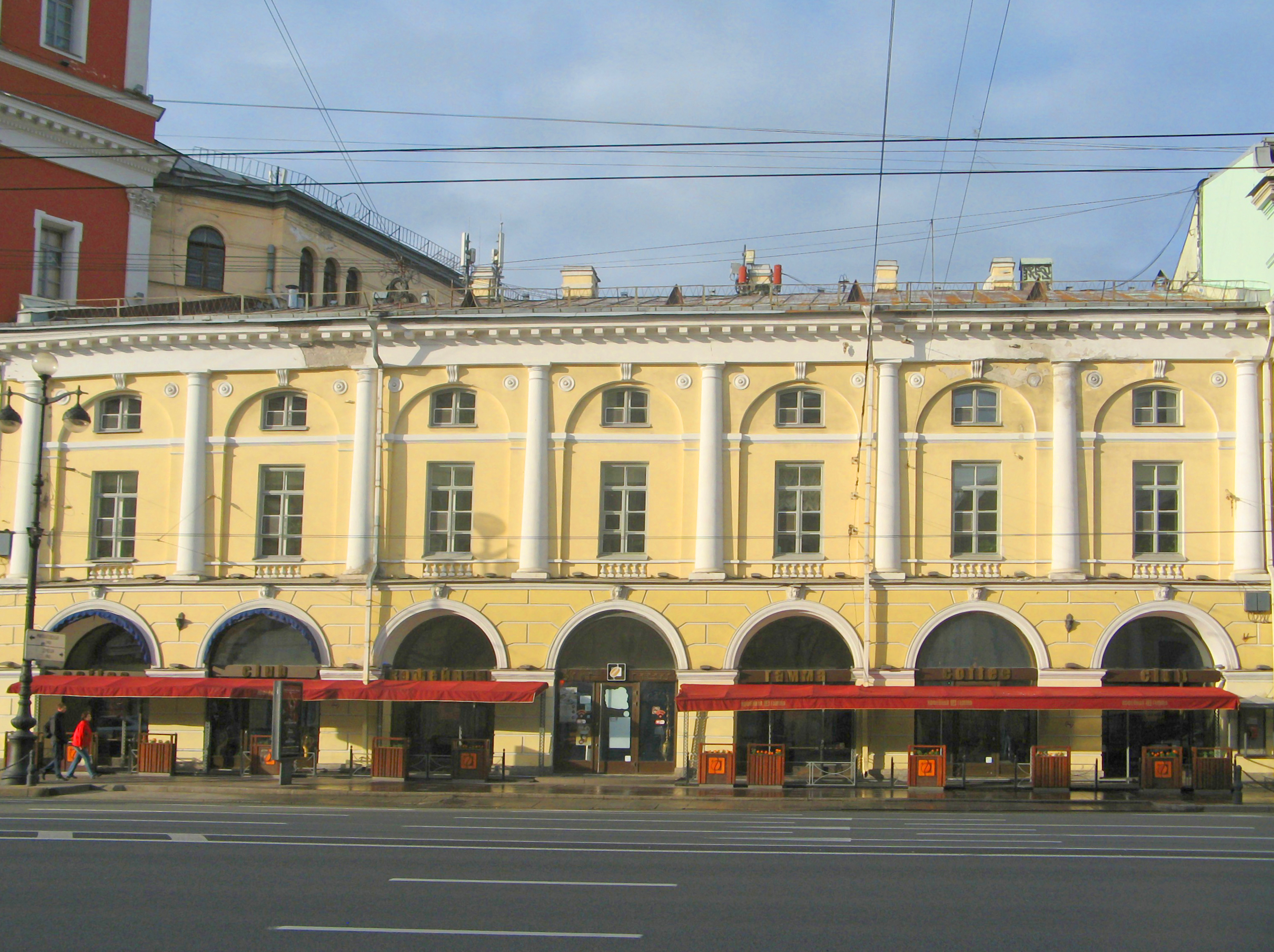
- Interactive map of Silver Rows
- Type: building

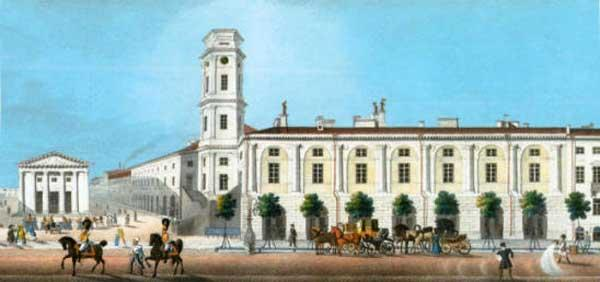
At the left – City Duma building and tower, originally resembling the Silver Rows. 1830s

Silver Rows — a monument of architecture. Located in Saint Petersburg, the modern address is Nevsky Prospekt, 31.

== History ==
Since the mid-18th century, wooden shops selling silver were located on the site; they burned down in 1783. In 1783–1784 (according to other sources, in 1787, or in 1784–1787, 1784–1786), a stone building was erected in their place by Giacomo Quarenghi.

The construction was initially funded by merchants, and later the building belonged to the Society of Shopkeepers of the Silver Rows.

After the Great Patriotic War, a sports goods store opened in the building.

In 1955, the internal walls of the building were dismantled, and a long-standing sports store "Dynamo" was placed in the resulting hall.

From the 1980s, the building housed the Saint Petersburg Culture Fund (initially the Leningrad branch of the Soviet Culture Fund).

After reconstruction in 1982, the "Isoproduktsiya" store opened in the building.

In the 1990s, the jewelry salon "Ananov" opened on the ground floor.

In December 2023, the restoration project for the facades of the "Silver Rows" was estimated at 2.7 million.

== Appearance ==
Initially, the lower floor of the three-story building was treated with an open arcade, which was closed in 1878 – its place was replaced by shop windows and entrances to the stores. The lower floor is also rusticated, and the upper part of the building is decorated with half-columns in the Tuscan order and false arches.

In 1799–1802, a tower was erected at the corner of Nevsky Prospekt and Dumskaya Street, uniting the rows and the City Duma building.

In the 1840s, the gallery of the Silver Rows was glazed.

In 1981–1982, the lower gallery was opened (according to the project by architects T. A. Boldyrev, V. P. Kozlov, V. A. Kharlamov).

In 1999, the arcade was glazed again. The authors of the project were Andrey Ananov and Irina Alexeeva – the president and chief artist of "Russian Jewelry Art – Ananov".

== Literature ==
- Петров А. Н., Борисова Е. А., Науменко А. П., Повелихина А. В. (1976). Памятники архитектуры Ленинграда (in Russian) (4th ed., rev. and add. ed.). Leningrad: Стройиздат. Ленинградское отделение. p. 576.
- Чеснокова А. Н. (1985). Невский проспект (in Russian). Leningrad: Лениздат. p. 208.
