= Mostovoi =

Mostovoi or Mostovoy (Russian: Мостовой, from мост meaning bridge) is a Russian masculine surname, its feminine counterpart is Mostovaya. It may refer to

- Aleksandr Mostovoi (born 1968), Russian football player
- Andrei Mostovoy (born 1997), Russian football player
- Artem Mostovyi (born 1983), Ukrainian football player
- Ruslan Mostovyi (born 1974), Ukrainian football player
- Sergey Mostovoy (1908–1979), Red Army private and Hero of the Soviet Union
