= Aleksey Sofronov =

Close friend of Pyotr Tchaikovsky (1859–1925)

- Алексей Софронов
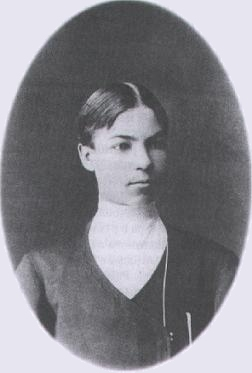
- Alexey Sofronov in a photograph of the second half of the 19th century
- Born: 1859; Tiliktino, Russia
- Died: 1925 (aged 65–66); Klin, Soviet Union
- Years active: Servant, memorial museum curator
- Spouses: Fyokla Sofronova; Ekaterina Sofronova

Alexey Ivanovich Sofronov (Russian: Алексей Иванович Софронов; 1859 – 1925) was a servant and close friend of Russian composer Pyotr Ilyich Tchaikovsky from 1871 until his death in 1893.

American researcher Roland John Wiley calls him the composer's “chief servant” and “household manager”. According to some researchers, Sofronov was Tchaikovsky's constant lover. (Note: V. S. Sokolov, a researcher of Tchaikovsky's biography, noted that the solution to the problem of the composer's sexual orientation is connected with a huge number of his unstudied letters. Some of them, for censorship reasons, were published in the Russian Empire and in Soviet times with abbreviations, and in some of the originals, whole “paragraphs [were] thickly obscured by later ‘well-wishers”.) After the death of his employer, a significant part of his estate went to Alexey Sofronov by will. After the composer's death, he took part in the creation of the Tchaikovsky Memorial Museum in Klin.

117 letters from the composer to Alexey Sofronov, written from 1875 to 1893, have been preserved. 130 letters from Alexey Sofronov to Tchaikovsky, dated 1877–1893, are kept in the archive of the composer's Klin house-museum. He is repeatedly mentioned in diary entries, letters, and memoirs of Tchaikovsky's friends and relatives as Alyosha and Lyonya. Sofronov is a character in movies about the composer and fictional literary works about his life. Alexey Sofronov became the main character in the book The House in Klin by Soviet local historian and biographer Vladimir Kholodkovsky, dedicated to the creation of the Tchaikovsky House-Museum.

== Biography ==
Alexey Sofronov was born in 1859 into a peasant family in a village in Klin uyezd, Moscow Governorate. In 1871, at the age of twelve, (Note: There are other dates: 1874 and 1873. N. D. Kashkin claimed in his memoirs that Alexei entered the composer's service only after his older brother's dismissal, i.e. in 1877, Anthony Holden believed that Alexei first served the composer in the summer, when his older brother left the service for a while to return to the village. Later they began to work together throughout the year.) Alexey followed his older brother Mikhail (Note: Mikhail Ivanovich Sofronov (1848, Klin, Moscow Province, Russian Empire - 1932) was a servant of the Czech violinist and composer Ferdinand Laub, a teacher at the Moscow Conservatory in 1871, and entered Tchaikovsky's service shortly before his younger brother. N. D. Kashkin describes his work in the composer's household: "Pyotr Ilyich was employed by a village boy, who himself prepared dinner for himself and the barin, which always consisted of soup and buckwheat porridge; the servant's culinary skills, it seems, did not go further, and the barin, who at that time was very unpretentious about the table, was satisfied with it".) into the service of Tchaikovsky. By that time, he had no experience in such work. Pauline Weidman, a doctor of art history, has suggested that the “all sorts of scribbles and inept drawings” that appear on the composer's archival documents from the first half of the 1870s were left by his “dabbling” teenage servant. (Note: This hypothesis was first proposed by the pianist Anna Alexandrova-Levenson in October 1914 on the basis of an analysis of the composer's draft manuscript in her possession. Komarov analyzes these scribbles in detail in his article. He attributes to them the entries on the sketches of opus 19, 21, 22, on the sketches of the opera Kuznets Vakula and on pp. 99-103 of volume 2 of Tate's book on L. van Beethoven, the scribbles are not made with a simple pencil, which Tchaikovsky usually used, but with an ink of dusty purple color.) Tchaikovsky got used to the boy, and he became, in the words of the composer's American biographer, “the only person he invariably needed”.

After Tchaikovsky got married in 1877, Mikhail Sofronov left the composer's service. (Note: According to Poznansky, he was fired by the composer. Anthony Holden saw the reason for the dismissal in the composer's rapidly deteriorating financial situation after his marriage; he was no longer able to pay the salaries of two servants. V.S. Sokolov in his book Antonina Tchaikovskaya. The Story of a Forgotten Life came to the same conclusion. B. S. Nikitin in his book about the composer mentions that Tchaikovsky's wife "in October 1877... invented all sorts of fantastic explanations [for Peter Ilyich's indifference to her after the wedding], like the fact that Tchaikovsky's servant, who lost his place because of his marriage, went to a sorceress who put hatred for her into Peter Ilyich's heart".) (Note: N. D. Kashkin, a close friend of the composer, reported in his memoirs that Mikhail became a coachman.) However, Alexey continued to serve Tchaikovsky in Moscow. In the 1870s, Alexey is often mentioned in the composer's correspondence with Modest Tchaikovsky (for example, the procedure of “scratching the composer's head” by the young servant is repeatedly referenced). Tchaikovsky, in a letter to his brother Anatoly, described one of his quarrels with Sofronov at this time:

“I suddenly became furious, tore my tie, my shirt, broke my chair, etc. As I indulged in these strange gymnastic exercises, I suddenly met his eyes. He looked so frightened, pitifully pale, and lost, saying, ‘What's wrong with you? Calm down,’ etc., that I immediately calmed down”.

In March 1878, Aleksey Sofronov began an affair with a certain Marie, who worked as a maid at the Villa Richelieu in Clarens, Switzerland, on the shores of lake Geneva, where the composer was living at the time. Roland John Wiley and Anthony Holden noted that, because of this, “his relationship with Tchaikovsky deteriorated”. In June 1879, an illegitimate child was born, with Sofronov declared to be the father.

=== Military service ===
Sofronov's work for the composer was temporarily interrupted in 1880, as the young man had to do military service (he was assigned to the Ekaterinoslav 1st Life-Grenadier Regiment stationed in Moscow). A certificate issued by the composer to his servant for submission to the enlistment office has been preserved. Tchaikovsky noted in it Sofronov's “impeccable honesty, integrity, diligence”, and “impeccable” behavior, expressed to him in writing as “the liveliest gratitude”. The term of service was reduced to four years as a result of the exam passed, but Sofronov was unlucky with his lot, which could have delayed the draft itself. Tchaikovsky took the parting with him hard: “I imagine how some stranger to me would have laughed when reading these lines; how surprised he would have been that one could yearn and suffer for a footman. But what to do, if this footman was at the same time my friend and at the same time so loyal and loving!” — he wrote. In February 1883, Aleksey fell seriously ill with pneumonia (the initial diagnosis of typhoid fever turned out to be a medical error), and after recovery, received a long (annual) leave. During his service, Sofronov rose to the rank of lieutenant.

=== Organization of Tchaikovsky's daily life ===
In his biography of Pyotr Ilyich, the composer's brother Modest asserted that “the latter, being a naive institute student in all practical matters of existence... could not personally supervise the arrangement of his small household and entrusted it to his servant, Sofronov.” He himself only acquired “completely superfluous things (he bought a pair of horses, which soon he did not know how to get rid of, and an old English clock, which turned out to be unusable), or books and sheet music for his library”. The master “completely surrendered to the arbitrariness of his servant, who, knowing the habits and predilections of his barin, managed to arrange everything, not chasing the requirements of taste and elegance, but only consistent with ‘what the barin liked’”. As a young man, Sofronov accompanied the composer on trips. In recent years, when Tchaikovsky settled in the Moscow region, Aleksey maintained exemplary order in the house, performed household and business errands, played the role of butler and housekeeper, and protected the creative solitude and peace of the composer.

N. V. Tumanina noted that in 1885, a servant hired for his master in the village of Maidanovo near Klin to rent the bar house of the ruined landowner Novikova “which stood on the high bank of the Sestra river in a dense, overgrown park with old tilia trees, colorful flower beds, and ponds”. It is known that the composer was disappointed with the estate; he wrote to his brother Modest: “What seemed luxurious and magnificent to Alyosha, seemed to me motley, tasteless, shabby, and dirty”. In 1888, Aleksey Sofronov hired a house (in the village of Frolovskoe) surrounded by a large garden in the absence of his master, again on his instructions. The composer praised the ability of his servant to create a cozy home: “Aleksey wonderfully arranged my new dwelling”. Tchaikovsky lived here for about three years.

The cellist Julian Poplavsky, who visited Tchaikovsky in Klin in 1892, noted to himself with amazement that the composer occupied only the upper floor and used only three rooms in the large building (the hall, dining room, and bedroom; from his point of view, of these, only the hall “resembled the dwelling of the most popular Russian composer”), while all other rooms, except for two or three intended for guests, were at the disposal of Aleksey Sofrononv. (Note: Alexei Sofronov's arrangement of the daily life and routine in Tchaikovsky's last residence in Klin is described in the Y. L. Davydov's book.)

According to the recollections of Klin residents, Sofronov said in private conversations that Tchaikovsky paid him 600 rubles a year. According to one of the residents of Klin, the composer bought Aleksey a small estate near the village of Strokino in Troitskaya volost, but the servant lived in his master's house and never visited Strokino (the author of the notes to the memoirs of Z. P. Kopenkin takes the information about the purchase of the estate as an error). In Klin, Sofronov was perceived by local residents as a confidant of Tchaikovsky, not a lackey.

=== Aleksey Sofronov and music ===
The servant, according to Modest Tchaikovsky, was the only witness to the process of creation of most of the composer's works, but "as if he did not hear them at all, and only once in his life unexpectedly expressed his enthusiastic approval of the chorus of girls in the 3rd scene of Eugene Onegin, to the composer's great surprise and dismay". Modest explained this distress by his brother's fear of having "a person constantly around him who would 'hear' him, approve and disapprove". This episode remained the only one, later Sofronov had no interest in the master's music. The composer himself wrote: "...no one, no human soul, except Alyosha, does not appear to me when I am busy [composing Eugene Onegin], and above all, I have a piano, the sounds of which, when I play, do not reach anyone except Alyosha". At the same time, there is evidence of Sofronov's own musicality: on July 3, 1883, in the village of Podushkino near Moscow, the composer recorded two songs sung in his presence by Aleksey and a laundrywoman. He was working on Suite No. 2 at the time, and placed the recordings of the songs he heard among his sketches. B. I. Rabinovich was able to identify these two songs. In his opinion, they are The Mother is scolding (this song is implied by the composer himself) and "Masha is not told to go behind the river" (he identified it by its melodic pattern and rhythm). Rabinovich noted that Tchaikovsky departed from the tradition of his time to consider truly folk music and to record only individual voices. In this case, Tchaikovsky recorded two voices of the performers. (Note: There is a musical notation (15 bars) with verbal commentary Alyosha and the Laundrywoman in the archives of the House Museum in Klin. It is registered under the signature A2, No. 14, folder I.)

Nikolai Kashkin, a composer's friend, remembers that in December 1875 the publisher Nikolai Berngard asked Tchaikovsky to write a piano cycle for the twelve monthly supplements of the magazine Nouvellist in 1876. The composer's work resulted in The Seasons. Kashkin wrote that Tchaikovsky, fearing that he might forget the commission, instructed Aleksey Sofronov to remind him of his obligation on a certain day of each month. Kashkin himself did not name the servant in his memoirs, but the English writer and musicologist Professor David Clifford Brown is convinced that it was Sofronov. The English researcher found the story to be entirely plausible, but noted that the surviving correspondence with the journal's editor indicated that the cycle had been completed by May 1876. He speculated that a lack of funds may have forced Tchaikovsky to finish ahead of schedule.

=== Aleksey Sofronov after composer's death ===
External image
- | Arkady Mazayev. Portrait of Alexey Sofronov, 1925

Aleksey Sofronov arrived from Klin, where he managed the estate house rented by Tchaikovsky, in St. Petersburg on the morning of the composer's death on October 25, 1893. Tchaikovsky hardly recognized his servant, but rejoiced at his appearance. The servant was present at the composer's death. Sofronov lived in Klin until his death in nineteen twenty-five. Shortly before Sofronov's death, sixteen-year-old Arkady Mazaev (future composer and Stalin Prize winner), who had the gift of an artist, sketched his portrait.

== Contribution to the Tchaikovsky Memorial Museum's creation ==
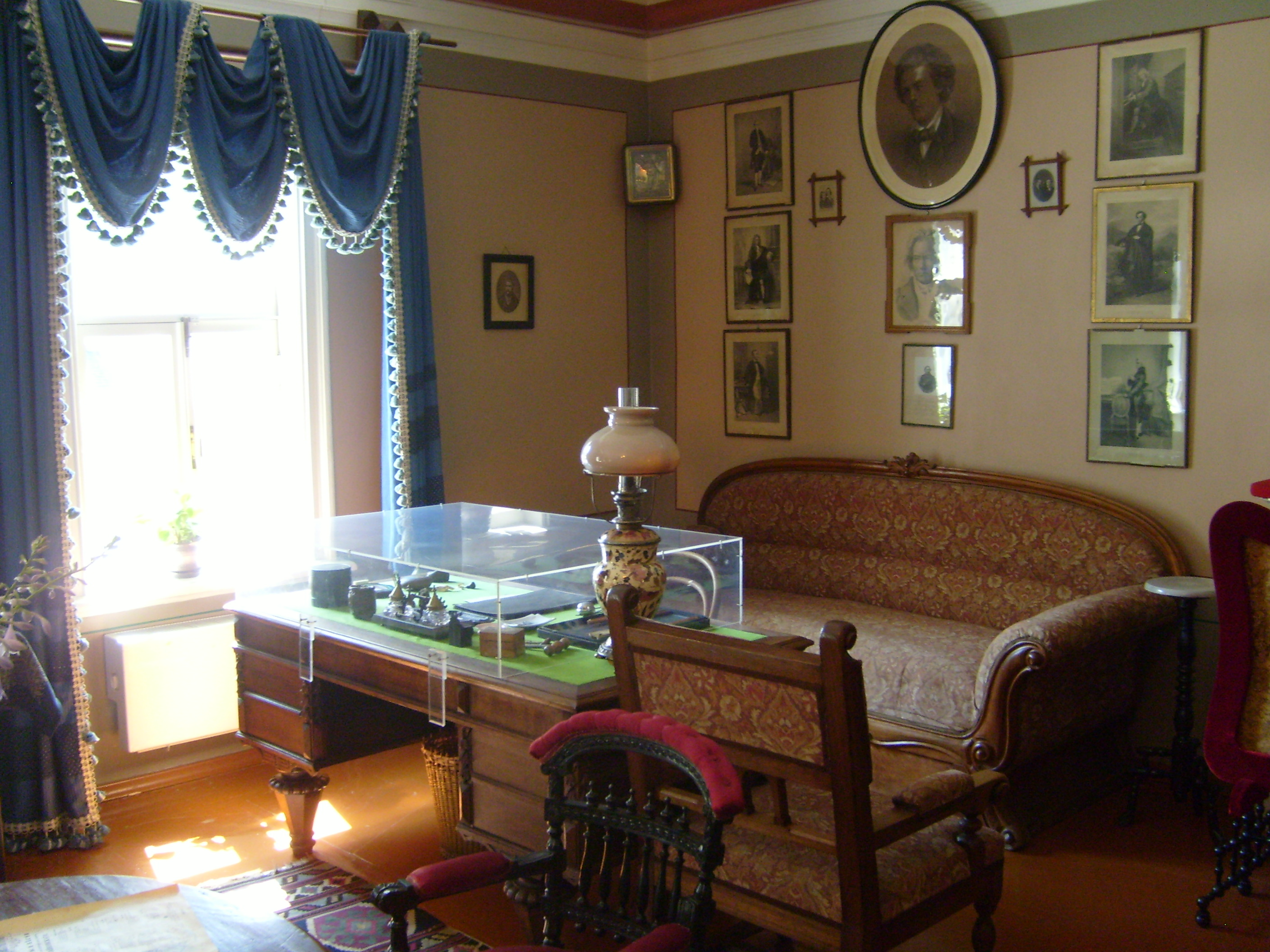
A desk in the reception room of the museum in Klin, on which Tchaikovsky worked on letters after breakfast

According to P. I. Tchaikovsky's will, one-seventh of the deceased composer's real estate and capital (Note: Musicologist Andrei Budyakovsky wrote about the division of the capital in the will into two equal shares between Davydov and Sofronov.) was transferred to Aleksey Sofronov. All material property was bequeathed to him, as well as 600 rubles in silver annually from the income from the performance of works. (Note: A 1974 guide to the museum-house in Klin erroneously states that Sofronov was the heir to “the composer's entire estate".) Soviet local historian Vladimir Kholodkovsky correlated the will with a quote from the composer's letter: "If he [Aleksey] outlives me... he can no longer be served by anyone, he is too spoiled, so it is necessary to provide for him at least a little".

For a month and a half the house in Klin was sealed in order to settle the questions of Pyotr Ilyich's will. After all the problems were solved, Sofronov invited Modest Tchaikovsky, and they divided the composer's archive between them. In a monograph devoted to Tchaikovsky's creative archive, Dr. Pauline Weidman, a doctor of art history, admitted that she had not been able to find any information about the principle of the division and could not establish it (for example, Sofronov received two notebooks with the composer's musical sketches and drafts made by him in 1867-1868, when the future servant did not even know Tchaikovsky). The documents delivered to Sofronov remained unknown to the composer's biographers and researchers for a long time. Only after Aleksey's death in 1926, his son George transferred them to the Klin House Museum (and later published some of them).

The composer's brother Modest decided to preserve the interiors in Klin. According to Modest's memoirs about the composer, Sofronov demanded five thousand rubles for the furniture he had received in his will. Only after Modest Tchaikovsky paid the requested sum, it turned out that the former servant had already purchased the house himself from the owner (V. S. Sakharov) (Note: Yuri Davydov (the composer's nephew) and his biographer reported that the owner of the house was the Klin magistrate, State Councillor V. S. Sakharov, who considered his estate a noble manor, Alexander Poznansky and The House-Museum of P. I. Tchaikovsky in Klin's guide 1956 called Sakharov a merchant.) for 8300 rubles. He agreed to allow Modest Tchaikovsky to live in the late composer's house only on condition that he pay 50 rubles a month. N.D. Kashkin, who visited the house, then owned by Sofronov, in 1895 (two years after the composer's death), described his impressions in the following way:

“Everything in the rooms remained in the order of the deceased: the cupboards with books and notes, the portraits on the walls, the small things on the writing table, not excluding the solitaire cards. Everything was in its place, only the master was missing, but it seemed as if he had just gone for a walk and was about to return. Looking through the books and papers, I found a leaf where Pyotr Ilyich had written down for memory what he had to do, and there, among other things, I saw a note: ‘Write to Kashkin’, but I probably had not received this letter yet”.

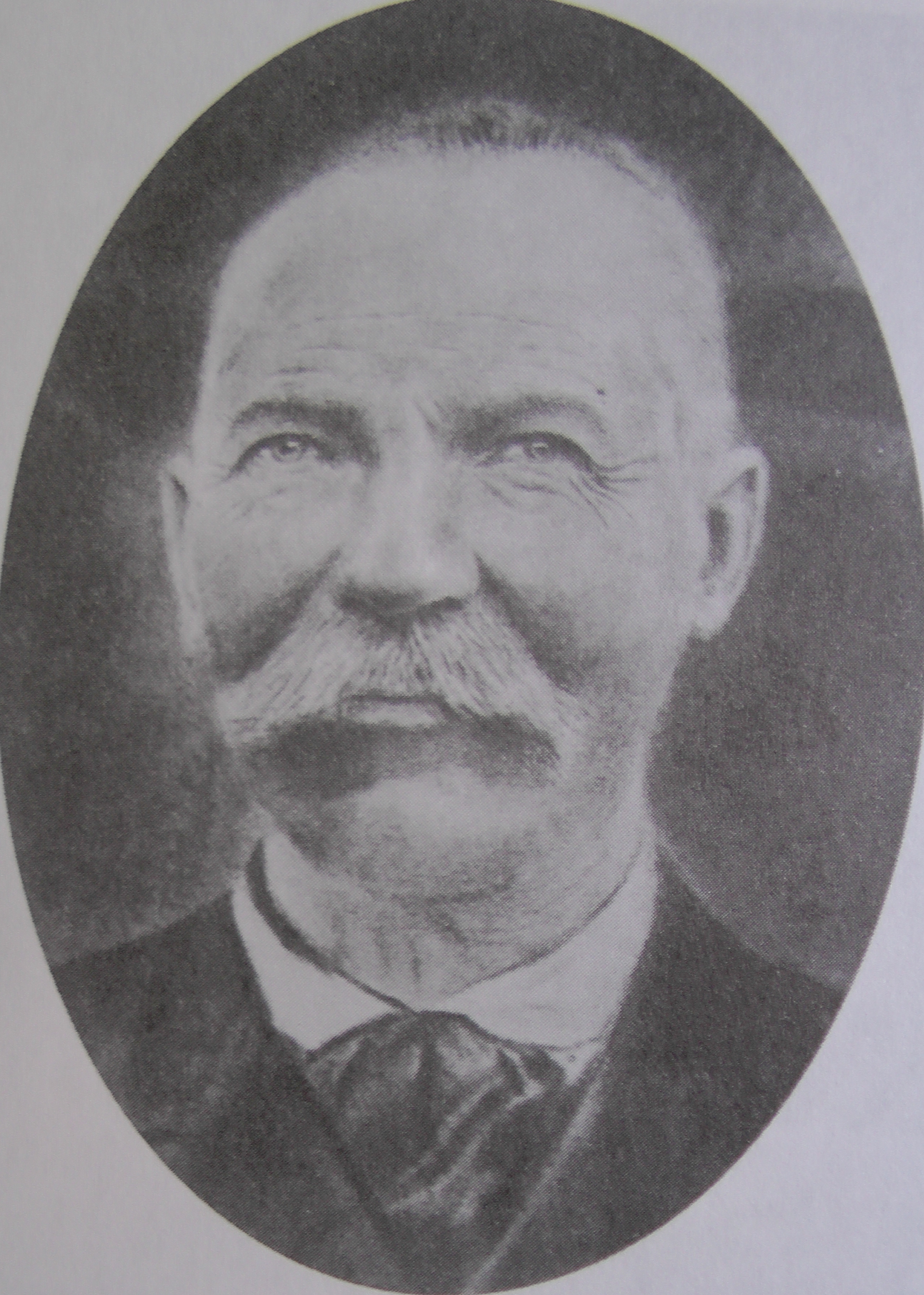
Aleksey Sofronov in 1900s

Polina Vaidman noted in her doctoral thesis: "Memorial objects (furniture, paintings, household items, clothes, etc.)... are the most valuable sources of the composer's biography. Practically every object is connected with some episode of Tchaikovsky's life and characterizes his personality, his habits. Clothes, household objects, pipe, writing instruments and accessories, dishes, furniture and other things tell more about the composer's private life than any other sources". In his memoirs, N. D. Kashkin respectfully calls the footman "Aleksey Ivanovich" and describes him as "a warm host".

In 1897, the house was purchased by Modest from Aleksey with funds provided to him by the composer's nephew Vladimir (Bob) Davydov from the proceeds of performances of the composer's works.

Aleksey Sofronov later participated in the organization of a memorial museum of his former employer at the estate in Klinu. Soviet museologist M. T. Belyavsky noted that the existence of the estate museum was possible "thanks to the fact that his [Tchaikovsky's] butler and friend, the peasant boy Aleksey Sofronov, who lived with Tchaikovsky for 20 years, kept 'everything as it was'". Sofronov was repeatedly approached with offers to sell certain unique items belonging to the late composer, but he always responded with a firm refusal.

There are reports that Sofronov worked in the memorial museum of the estate. He wrote to Modest Tchaikovsky in 1895: "Peter Ilyich's apartment was visited by the honored professor of National University of Kharkiv, two other engineers and a lady. They examined the house and asked why so little was known about the existence of this expensive apartment".

== Private life ==
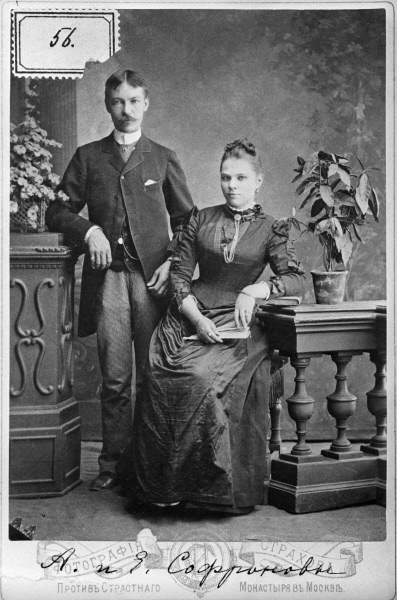
Aleksey Sofronov with his second wife Ekaterina

In 1888, in the absence of his master but “with his full approval”, Alexey married a girl named Fyokla. The previous time he had fallen in love, a wedding was scheduled, and Tchaikovsky, at his request, also left for Moscow so as not to interfere with his celebrations; however, “at the last moment, the bride changed her mind, and the matter ended in nothing”. The composer, having met the servant's wife, called her “pretty and handsome”. Fyokla experienced serious health problems and was often ill, dying of tuberculosis in 1890. Fyokla's severe illness coincided with a sharp deterioration in the composer's financial situation. Modest Tchaikovsky, Herman Laroche, Alexander Legoshin, and their three-year-old daughter were constantly visiting his house, which resulted in additional expenses. The tense situation repeatedly led to quarrels between the master and his servant “over trifles”. After the death of his wife, Alexey married a second time in February 1891; again, Tchaikovsky was absent from the wedding at the servant's request. Tchaikovsky wrote to his brother that the new wife of his favorite servant was Ekaterina (she was born in 1873 and was considerably younger than Sofronov):

“[She] turned out to be very pretty and spicy, terribly to Laroche's taste, but... I am angry with her every time I enter to Alexey's room during their tea-party and see how terribly in love with his wife that man is. I remember poor, kindest Feklusha, who is rotting a few fathoms away from us”.

Later, the composer became godfather to Aleksey Sofronov and Ekaterina's son, Georgy, who was born on April 23, 1892. The birth was difficult; his mother almost died. Tchaikovsky spoke of the boy as “an unusually handsome child”. In Soviet times, Georgy became an engineer. It is known from Tchaikovsky's correspondence that Aleksey Sofronov had a diary:

“While Alyosha went to church yesterday, I needed some paper, and while looking for it in his dresser, I came across a very interesting manuscript. It's a diary which, as it turns out, he kept in Sanremo last year. I devoured it with great interest. It turns out that he only appeared to be so emotionless, but in fact, he was suffering and longing terribly. It moved me greatly. Now he has gone to town to get stamps, and I will use this time to make some extracts for you; they are of great interest".

Thanks to the composer's extracts, quite extensive fragments of Alexey Sofronov's diary for 1878 have been preserved, which were first published in Russia in the collection Unknown Tchaikovsky: The Last Years in 2010.

"...P[yotr] I[lych] was very glad that he would soon part with me. M[odeist] I[llyich] told me about it too, and I accepted it quite cordially at dinner. P[yotr] I[lych] said that maybe we would go away and I should stay here. I said nothing in the evening. Kolya pranked me; I didn't say anything, but when he wouldn't let me make a call, I pushed him away. At the doctor's orders, I rubbed him in and went to bed, (Note: Anthony Holden calls the disease that threatened Sofronov's service with Tchaikovsky and incurred the wrath of his employer syphilis; Tchaikovsky himself refers to the disease in a letter from San Remo to A. I. Tchaikovsky as “venere”.) but I didn't want to sleep. I don't know why: whether I was so upset or because it was such a sleepless night. They went for a walk, came home, and talked among themselves. Pyotr Ilyich said that's how they take revenge for love; there's not much money here, but they treat him. I was so offended that I went to my room, drank a glass of water to keep from crying, laid my things down, and waited for the brother of mercy to come for me. I was so sad to be parted from my barin. I don't know what was the matter with me; I cried an awful lot, but no one noticed it. I saw a young man dressed as a monk in a black robe come to our top and start talking to M. I. He called me and announced that the man had come for me. I went to get dressed, cried for the last time, washed myself with water so that no one would notice, got dressed, and went to them..."

117 letters from the composer to Alexey Sofronov, written between 1875 and 1893, have been preserved. 130 letters from Alexey Sofronov to Tchaikovsky, dated 1877–1893, are kept in the archives of the composer's Klin house-museum.

Dearest Lyonya,

I miss you very much. Tell me what you are doing, whether you are well, whether you miss me very much, how you are living - describe everything in detail. I feel much better now. I know nothing yet about when I shall return to Russia and how long I shall live abroad. I shall have to think it over and discuss it all.

Anyway, don't worry about yourself. I will never leave you, because I love you like a brother. If God helps me to get money, I'll send you abroad. It's very hard for me to live without you. But whatever happens, and you will be well. Answer me now and address the letter this way:

Suisse. Genève. Poste restante. M. Pierre Tchaïkovsky.

If you can't write this address well, ask Nikolai Lvovich.

Kisses, my little dove.

Your P. Tchaikovsky

== Composer's biographers on the role of Aleksey Sofronov in the Tchaikovsky's life ==
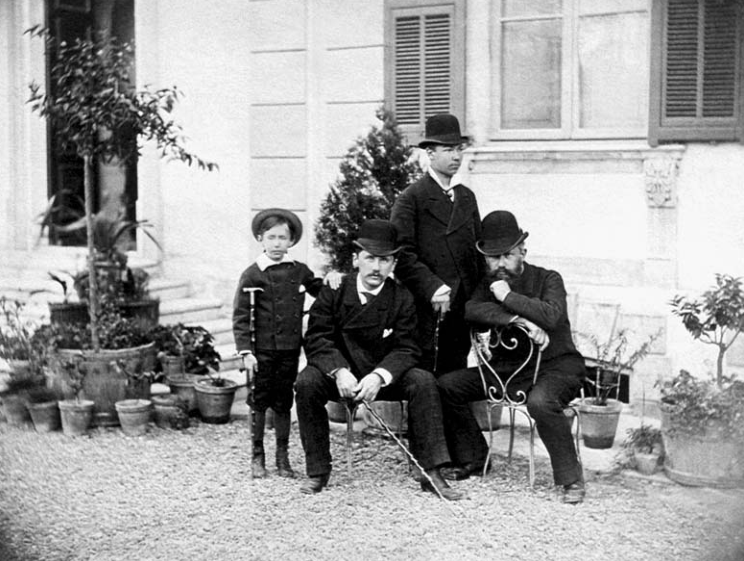
From left to right: Kolya Konradi, Modest Tchaikovsky, Aleksey Sofronov and Pyotr Tchaikovsky, January 1878

Soviet art historians and biographers of the composer usually mention Aleksey Sofronov only briefly. Thus, Joseph Kunin, in a book published in 1958, characterizes Aleksey Sofronov as "an ordinary servant and companion of the composer" and names him (along with Modest Tchaikovsky) as the founder of the Tchaikovsky House Museum in Klin. The musicologist Arnold Alschwang included a photograph of his servant in his monograph on Tchaikovsky's work, but devoted only a few lines to him: "The entire economic side of Tchaikovsky's life was managed by his servant, A. I. Sofronov, who, after the composer's death, preserved all the furnishings of his last house, which is now a museum". N. A. Kalinina, the author of fictionalized biographies of 19th-century composers, wrote about the servant: "Indispensable Aleksey Sofronov, for twenty years studied the habits, tastes, customs of his master, quickly and without unnecessary fuss created the necessary home comfort". The local historian Vladimir Kholodkovsky, who gave Aleksey an important place in his book The House in Klin, wrote that the word "servant" is not suitable to characterize Sofronov, "who for almost twenty years bore all the domestic duties, all the household worries and troubles, thus relieving his ignorant and helpless master in practical matters".

A number of Tchaikovsky's life and work researchers believe that Aleksey Sofronov had a homosexual relationship with the composer. For example, Alexander Poznansky, an American biographer of Tchaikovsky, suggested that they were brought together by the restlessness of the composer's daily life, his bachelor habits, and his inability to manage his daily affairs independently. He wrote:

"Alyosha was everything to Tchaikovsky: a servant and a traveling companion, an economist and a nursemaid, a friend, a student, and to some extent even a son. Undoubtedly, for a time, at the very beginning of their relationship, he was also his master's lover. At the end of 1877, the composer, in one of the darkest periods of his life, wrote to Anatoly that he found comfort in his servant: "He has understood very well what I need from him now, and he satisfies more than all my demands." The sexual connotation here is so obvious that Soviet censors suppressed this passage in later editions of Tchaikovsky's correspondence". (Note: О купюрах в публикациях писем композитора идёт речь в книге: Петухова С. А. (автор-составитель). Библиография жизни и творчества П. И. Чайковского. Указатель литературы, вышедшей на русском языке за 140 лет (1866–2006). М.: Государственный институт искусствознания, 2014. pp. 114—115. 856 p. ISBN 978-5-98287-081-0.)

Poznansky noted that the composer felt "uncomfortable with such closeness" and at the same time, as a man of his time, could not get rid of class prejudices, so he felt "irritation because of his [Sofronov's] low origin". Nevertheless, Poznansky noted that despite Tchaikovsky's irascibility toward those close to him, in his diaries and letters he practically never spoke negatively about his servant. In an article for the collection Tchaikovsky and His World, published in English in 1998, Alexander Poznansky wrote about the evolution of Aleksey Sofronov's relationship with his employer, that they "went from bedfellow to valued friend, who eventually married with Tchaikovsky's blessing but remained in his household until the end"), and Leslie Kearney, Associate Professor of Musicology at Indiana University, about the composer's obsession with his servant Alesha. Anthony Holden also claimed: "There is no doubt that Aleksey did sexual favors for Tchaikovsky," but insisted that the relationship between them later took on a different character, citing a letter from the composer. He wrote that by the age of eighteen Aleksey had become "inexpressibly dull," but "for my heart he remained as sweet as ever. Whatever happens, I will never part with him". Valery Sokolov came to the same conclusion after analyzing the composer's letters. However, he noted that such a conclusion remains in the realm of suppositions, and it is impossible, in his opinion, to confirm it with documentary evidence. The basis of Tchaikovsky's warm and close relationship with his servant was, in Sokolov's opinion, "paternal rather than 'sensual' love".

A similar point of view in assessing the relationship between Tchaikovsky and Sofronov was taken by David Clifford Brown, a professor at the University of Southampton. In his book about the composer he wrote: "The generosity of his bequest to Aleksey indicates the affection Tchaikovsky felt for his servant and raises the question of whether their relationship was merely businesslike. Certainly, the extremely fiery tone of some of Tchaikovsky's letters shows that the strength of his personal concern for Aleksey was very great", "the closeness of their relationship would become a source of deep jealousy among some of Tchaikovsky's relatives", "it seems plausible that Tchaikovsky sought sexual gratification from Aleksey (who himself was apparently heterosexual)".

The writer and memoirist Nina Berberova believed that Tchaikovsky's close relationship with Sofronov was not noticed by those around him: "Just as his love for Bob [the composer's nephew] was taken by outsiders to be love for children in general, so his love for Alyosha (different, ordinary, but also sweet) could be taken to be love for ordinary people.

== Aleksey Sofronov's representation in fiction and cinematography ==
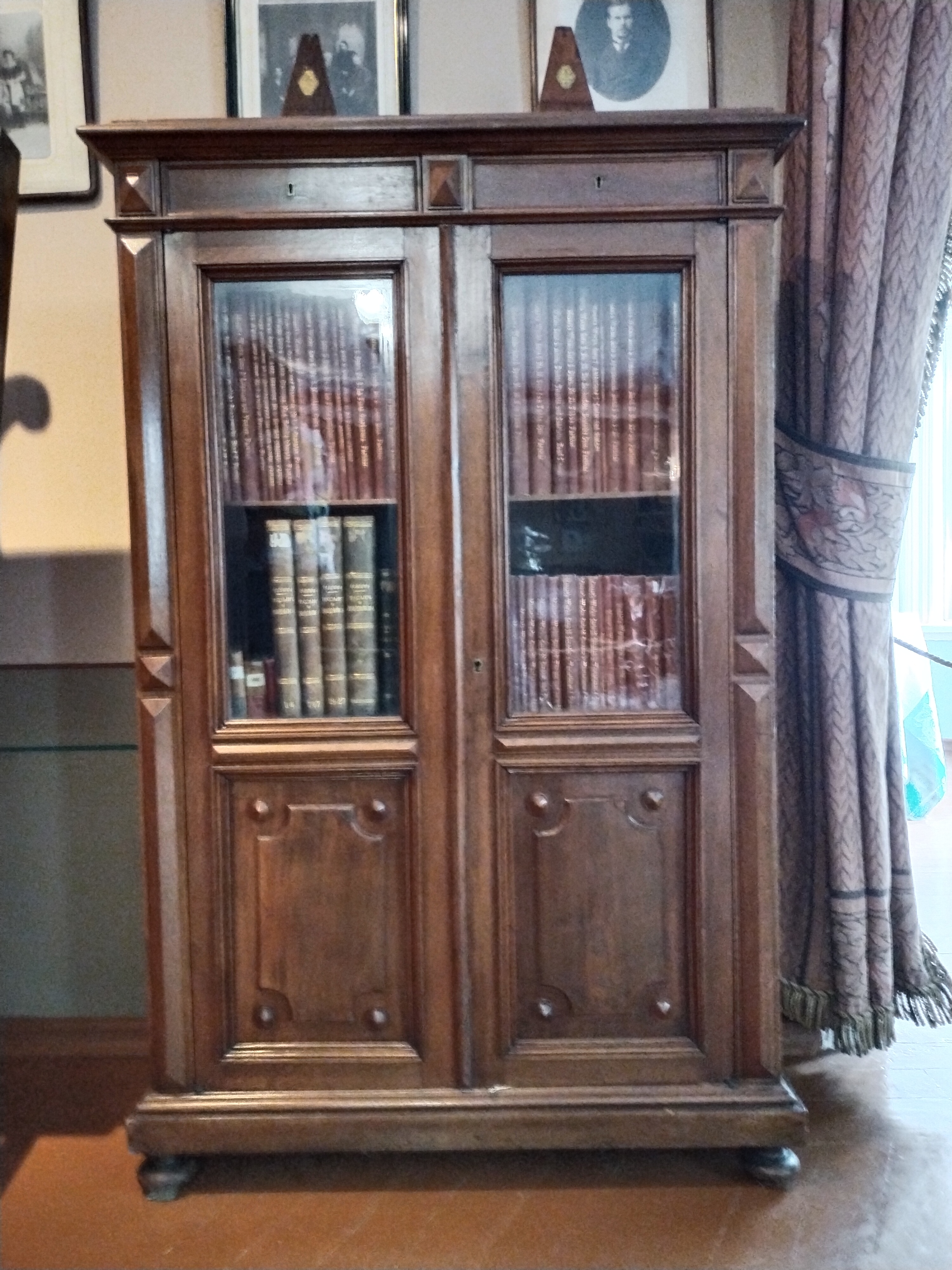
Bookcase in Tchaikovsky's house-museum in Klin. The red volumes on the top shelf are the Complete Works of W. A. Mozart, given by Jurgenson to the composer with the help of Alexey Sofronov. A. Mozart was presented by Jurgenson to the composer with the assistance of Alexey Sofronov.

German writer Klaus Mann portrayed Sofronov in his novel Pyotr Ilyich Tchaikovsky. Symphonie Pathétique (original title: German Symphonie Pathétique, 1935). The novel takes place from December 1887 to October 1893. Real events of Aleksey Sofronov's life and his relationship with the composer are mentioned (entering the service at the age of twelve, presenting Tchaikovsky at Christmas, on behalf of the publisher P. I. Jurgenson, with the complete works of Mozart, published in Leipzig by the publishing house Breitkopf und Haertel, the death of Aleksey's first wife...). At the time of the novel's events, Sofronov, as the author puts it, "is already married and completely unsuitable as an object of [Tchaikovsky's] fruitless admiration". Aleksey Sofronov also became one of the characters in Soviet writer Margarita Yamshchikova's fictional biography of the composer, Tchaikovsky: A Biographical Narrative (1954, the book was published under the pseudonym Al. Altayev) and Natalia Kalinina's documentary-fiction story P. I. Tchaikovsky, published in 1988 by the publishing house Children's Literature. In the book Peter Tchaikovsky and Nadezhda von Meck by the French writer of Russian origin Henri Troyat (2004), Aleksey is one of the minor characters.

=== Aleksey Sofronov in cinematography ===
The American music critic Charles P. Mitchell, in one of the chapters of his book Great Composers Captured in Films from 1913 to 2002, analyzed the films about Tchaikovsky made up to the beginning of the 21st century. In Nazi Germany, the film Amidst the Noisy Ball (1939). Andrei Vasilchenko, a candidate of historical sciences, characterized the film as "a beautiful melodrama imbued with Tchaikovsky's music", but wrote that without the music and the excellent acting of the actors, it could have been perceived as "a craft staged in elegant interiors and with excessive pathetics". The film premiered a few days before World War II. The servant, Aleksey Sofronov, outlived his master and became the heir to much of Tchaikovsky's estate.

External image
- Aleksey Sofronov saving the composer during his suicide attempt in the movie Tchaikovsky (USSR, 1969)

Reviewing the 1948 biographical film Song of My Heart (USA, directed by Benjamin Glaser), dedicated to Tchaikovsky, Charles P. Mitchell called the servant Stefan Ivanov, played by Russian-born American actor Mikhail Razumny, a "transformation" of Aleksey Sofronov. Hiding behind the initials T.M.P., an anonymous New York Times film critic wrote in 1948: "In fact, the level of perception of this picture is indicated by the fact that Mikhail Razumny, who plays the faithful servant, makes an impression that overshadows the protagonist. In their search for a comic effect, the producers could not have made a better choice than Mr. Razumny, who is an extremely accomplished actor and a gifted comedian". A different position on the interpretation of the role was taken by film critic John Howard Reed. He wrote: "The film bears only the most superficial resemblance to Tchaikovsky's life. The main and most unpleasant change is the introduction of a fictitious, comic character — the valet played by Mikhail Razumny. The complete elimination of all of his scenes (including all of the ridiculous prologue and epilogue in which he also appears...) would greatly improve the film".

In the Soviet two-part widescreen feature film Tchaikovsky, produced in 1969 at the Mosfilm studio (released in 1970, nominated for a Golden Globe and an Academy Award) by director Igor Talankin, the role of the composer's servant Alyosha was played by the future People's Artist of the USSR Yevgeny Leonov. Film critic Ninel Ismailova wrote about the actor's role: "Alyosha in the performance of Leonov a little funny, but above all, kind, loving. Good attitude to people and a great spirituality, which, like any energy, is concentrated in the inside and comes out in some moments of life: this Leonov showed psychologically very subtle and tactful".

In British director Ken Russell's film the Music Lovers (1971), the role of Aleksey Sofronov was played by film director, actor, screenwriter and author Bruce Robinson. The Russian film critic Aleksey Gusev wrote about this film the Music Lovers appears to those unfamiliar with it as an outrageous (or charmingly willful) parody of the true biography of Tchaikovsky. It is the most egregious moments of the film in which Russell, for the sake of red words, it seems, sacrifices elementary decency, — at least an accurate generalization of real, documented facts". In the Russian director Adel Al-Hadad's film Apocrypha: Music for Peter and Paul (2004), which takes place at the estate of the Davydovs, where Tchaikovsky is a guest for four days, the role of Aleksey Sofronov was played by comedian Alexander Oleshko. The movie won awards at domestic and international festivals, but was ridiculed by film critics. Thus, about the scene with Sofronov, candidate of philosophical sciences and doctor of art history Nina Tsyrkun wrote: "And when the director suddenly allows himself freedom, it turns out to be vulgarity: from the valise with the notes of the composer Tchaikovsky, which the servant unpacked, the first on public view appears night pot — it seems to be an illustration of the key thesis: 'Gogol was also considered gloomy and heavy, and he just felt his shoes sting'".

== Bibliography ==
=== Sources ===
- Aybinder, A. I. (2010). Ваш П. Чайковский. Неизвестные письма П. И. Чайковского // Неизвестный Чайковский. Последние годы. Сборник материалов. Редактор П. Е. Вайдман [Your P. Tchaikovsky. Unknown letters of P. I. Tchaikovsky]. Гении и злодеи (in Russian). М.: Алгоритм. pp. 167–194.
- Davydov, Y. L. (1962). Записки о П. И. Чайковском [Notes about P. I. Tchaikovsky.] (in Russian). М.: Государственное музыкальное издательство. p. 116.
- Kashkin, N. D. (1954). Воспоминания о П. И. Чайковском. Общая редакция, вступительная статья и примечания С. И. Шлифштейна [Memories of P. I. Tchaikovsky. General editorial, introductory article and notes by S. I. Shlifshtein]. Русская классическая музыкальная критика (in Russian). М.: Государственное музыкальное издательство. p. 225.
- Клинчане вспоминают Чайковского. Публикация З. П. Копёнкиной // П. И. Чайковский. Забытое и новое. Составители П. Е. Вайдман, Г. И. Белонович [Klin's citizens remembering Tchaikovsky. Publication by Z.P. Kopyonkina] (in Russian). М.: Министерство культуры Московской области / Государственный дом-музей П. И. Чайковского в Клину, ООО «Интерграф Сервис». 2003. pp. 374–387.
- Poplavsky, Yu. I. (1973). Последний день П. И. Чайковского в Клину // Воспоминания о П. И. Чайковском. 2-е изд [P. I. Tchaikovsky's last day in Klin] (in Russian). М.: Музыка. pp. 373–381.
- Skvirskaya, T. Z. (2003). Неизвестные письма Чайковского из фондов Российской национальной библиотеки // П. И. Чайковский. Забытое и новое. Составители П. Е. Вайдман, Г. И. Белонович. М.: Министерство культуры Московской области / Государственный дом-музей П. И. Чайковского в Клину, ООО «Интерграф Сервис» [Unknown letters of Tchaikovsky from the collections of the Russian National Library] (in Russian). Альманах. pp. 313–319.
- Sokolov, V. S. (2010). От памятника к человеку. Избранные письма П. И. Чайковского без купюр // Неизвестный Чайковский. Последние годы. Сборник материалов. Редактор П. Е. Вайдман [From Monument to Man. Selected letters of P. I. Tchaikovsky without censorship// Unknown Tchaikovsky. Last years. Collection of materials]. Гении и злодеи (in Russian). М.: Алгоритм. pp. 209–300.
- Tchaikovsky, M. I. (1997). Жизнь Петра Ильича Чайковского (по документам, хранившимся в архиве в Клину) in 3 volumes [Life of Pyotr Ilyich Tchaikovsky (based on documents kept in the archive in Klin) in 3 volumes]. Гений в искусстве (in Russian). Vol. 3. 1885—1893. М.: Алгоритм. p. 401. ISBN 5-88878-007-3
- Tchaikovsky, P. I. (1940). Письма к родным [Letters to relatives] (in Russian). Vol. 1. 1850—1879. М.: Государственное музыкальное издательство. p. 778.

=== Researches and non-fiction ===
- Alshvang, A. A. (1970). П. И. Чайковский [P. I. Tchaikovsky]. Классики мировой музыкальной культуры (in Russian). М.: Музыка. p. 81.
- Berberova, N. N. (1997). Чайковский. Биография [Tchaikovsky. Biography] (in Russian). СПб.: Лимбус Пресс. p. 256. ISBN 978-5-8370-0361-5. ISBN 5-8370-0361-4
- Budyakovsky, A. E. (2005). Жизнь Петра Ильича Чайковского [Pyotr Ilych Tchaikovsky's Life] (in Russian). СПб.: КультИнформПресс. p. 351.
- Vasilchenko, А. V. (2010). Зара Леандер — шведская звезда немецкого кино // Прожектор доктора Геббельса. Кинематограф Третьего рейха [Zara Leander - Swedish star of German cinema // Dr. Goebbels' Spotlight. Cinematography of the Third Reich]. Элегантная диктатура (in Russian). М.: Вече. pp. 156–179. ISBN 978-5-9533-4216-2.
- Gusev, А. (2011). Кино Кена [Kena's movies] (in Russian). Сеанс: Журнал.
- Вайдман, P. E. (2000). Архив П. И. Чайковского: текстологические и биографические исследования (творчество и жизнь): Научный доклад на соискание учёной степени доктора искусствоведения [Archives of P. Tchaikovsky's Archive: Textual and Biographical Studies (Creativity and Life): Scientific Report for the Degree of Doctor of Art History] (in Russian). М.: Государственный институт искусствознания. p. 67.
- Waidman, P. Е. (1988). Творческий архив П. И. Чайковского [Pyotr Ilych Tchaikovsky's artistic archive] (in Russian). М.: Музыка. p. 176. ISBN 5-7140-0200-8
- Davydov, Yu. L. (1965). Клинские годы творчества Чайковского [The Klin years of Tchaikovsky's work] (in Russian). М.: Московский рабочий. p. 125.
- Ismailova, N. Kh. (2000). Евгений Леонов // Леонов Е. П. Письма, статьи, воспоминания. Составитель В. Я. Дубровский [Evgeniy Leonov] (in Russian). М.: Центрполиграф. pp. 7–126. ISBN 5-227-00583-4
- Komarov, А. V. (2003). «Бетховен и его время». История одного уникального литературного сочинения Чайковского // П. И. Чайковский. Забытое и новое. Составители П. Е. Вайдман, Г. И. Белонович. М.: Министерство культуры Московской области / Государственный дом-музей П. И. Чайковского в Клину, ООО «Интерграф Сервис» ["Beethoven and His Time". The story of one unique literary work by Tchaikovsky] (in Russian). Альманах. pp. 150–161.
- Konisskaya, L. M. (1974). Adagio lamentoso // Чайковский в Петербурге. 2-е изд., переработанное и дополненное (in Russian). Л.: Лениздат. pp. 270–306.
- Kunin, I. F. (1958). Петр Ильич Чайковский [Pyotr Ilych Tchaikovsky]. Жизнь замечательных людей (in Russian). Vol. 265. М.: Молодая Гвардия. p. 365.
- Nikitin, B. S. (1990). Чайковский. Старое и новое [Tchaikovsky. The old and the new] (in Russian). М.: Знание. p. 208. ISBN 5-07-000670-3
- Poznansky, А. N. (2007). Смерть Чайковского. Легенды и факты [Tchaikovsky's death. Legends and facts] (in Russian). СПб.: Композитор. p. 254. ISBN 978-5-7379-0361-9.
- Poznansky, А. N. (2010). Чайковский [Tchaikovsky]. Жизнь замечательных людей (in Russian). М.: Молодая гвардия. p. 800. ISBN 978-5-235-03347-4.
- Pribeguina, G. A. (1983). Пётр Ильич Чайковский [Pyotr Ilych Tchaikovsky]. Русские и советские композиторы. Библиотечная серия (in Russian). М.: Музыка. p. 192.
- Rabinovich, B. I. (2003). Москва и народная песня в творчестве Чайковского // П. И. Чайковский. Забытое и новое. Составители П. Е. Вайдман, Г. И. Белонович [Moscow and folk song in Tchaikovsky's works // P. I. Tchaikovsky. Forgotten and New. Compiled by P. E. Vaidman, G. I. Belonovich] (in Russian). М.: Министерство культуры Московской области / Государственный дом-музей П. И. Чайковского в Клину, ООО «Интерграф Сервис». pp. 67–75.
- Rabinovich, B. I. (1963). П. И. Чайковский и народная песня. Сборник, составление, редакция, предисловие и комментарии Б. И. Рабиновича [P. I. Tchaikovsky and Folk Song. Collection, compilation, editing, foreword and commentary by B. I. Rabinovich.]. Русская классическая музыкальная критика (in Russian). М.: Государственное музыкальное издательство. pp. 3–45.
- Sokolov, V. S. (1994). Антонина Чайковская. История забытой жизни [Antonina Tchaikovskaya. The story of a forgotten life] (in Russian). М.: Музыка. p. 296. ISBN 978-5-7140-0565-7. ISBN 5-7140-0565-1
- Sokolov, V. S. (1995). Письма П. И. Чайковского без купюр. Неизвестные страницы эпистолярии // П. И. Чайковский. Забытое и новое. Составители П. Е. Вайдман, Г. И. Белонович [Letters of P. I. Tchaikovsky without bills. Unknown pages of epistolary] (in Russian). М.: Министерство культуры Московской области / Государственный дом-музей П. И. Чайковского в Клину, ИИФ «Мир и культура». pp. 118–135.
- Tumanina, N. V. (1968). П. И. Чайковский [P. I. Tchaikovsky] (in Russian). Vol. 2. Великий мастер. 1878—1893. М.: Наука. p. 487.
- Kholden, E. (2003). Пётр Чайковский [Pyotr Tchaikovsky]. Русские биографии (in Russian). М.: Эксмо. p. 672. ISBN 5-699-04129-X
- Kholodkovsky, V. V. (1962). Дом в Клину [House in Klin] (in Russian). М.: Московский рабочий. p. 341.
- Tsyrkun, N. A. (2005). Девятый вал [The ninth shaft] (in Russian). Сеанс: Журнал.
- Brown, D. (2009). Tchaikovsky. The Man and his Music. Pegasus Books. p. 496. ISBN 978-1605-9801-71.
- Kearney, L. (1998). Tchaikovsky Androgyne: The Maid of Orleans. // Tchaikovsky and His World. The Bard Music Festival (Book 35). Princeton: Princeton University Press. pp. 239–276. ISBN 0-691-00430-7
- Last Will and Testamen of P. I. Tchaikosky // Tchaikovsky Papers: Unlocking the Family Archive. Ed. Vaidman P. E. New Haven: Yale University Press. 2018. pp. 216–219. ISBN 978-0300-2354-49.
- Reid, J. H. (2006). Song of My Heart // More Movie Musicals. Hollywood classics. Vol. 18. Lulu. pp. 173–174. ISBN 978-1411-6734-27.
- T. M. P. (1948). At the Park Avenue. The New York Times: Газета.
- Mitchell, C. P. (2010). Peter Ilyich Tchaikovsky // The Great Composers Portrayed on Film, 1913 through 2002. McFarland. pp. 252–263. ISBN 978-0786-4458-68.
- Poznansky, A. (1998). Tchaikovsky: A Life Reconsidered // Tchaikovsky and His World. The Bard Music Festival (Book 35). Princeton: Princeton University Press. pp. 3–54. ISBN 0-691-00430-7
- Wiley, R. J. (2009). Tchaikovsky. Oxford: Oxford University Press. p. 592. ISBN 978-0195-3689-25.

=== Fiction ===
- Altayeva, A. (1954). Чайковский [Tchaikovsky] (in Russian). М.: Детгиз. p. 526.
- Kalinina, N. A. (1988). П. И. Чайковский [P. I. Tchaikovsky] (in Russian). М.: Детская литература. p. 143. ISBN 5080010355
- Mann, К. (2010). Петр Ильич Чайковский. Патетическая симфония [Pyotr Ilyich Tchaikovsky. Pathetic Symphony]. Жизнь замечательных людей (АСТ) (in Russian). М.: АСТ, Астрель, ВКТ. p. 378. ISBN 978-5-271-27467-1.
- Truaya, А. (2004). Петр Чайковский и Надежда фон Мекк. Перевод О. Озеровой [Pyotr Tchaikovsky and Nadezhda von Meck]. Русские биографии (in Russian). М.: Эксмо. p. 192.

=== Reference editions ===
- Автографы к музыкальным произведениям // Автографы П. И. Чайковского в архиве Дома-музея в Клину: Справочник. / Академия наук СССР, Институт истории искусств; Государственный дом-музей П. И. Чайковского в Клину. Авт.-сост.: К. Ю. Давыдова, Е. М. Орлова, Г. Р. Фрейндлинг [Autographs to musical works] (in Russian). Vol. 1: Автографы к музыкальным произведениям, Записные книжки и дневники. М.: Комитет по делам искусств при Совете министров СССР. Отделение научно-исследовательских учреждений. Государственный дом-музей П. И. Чайковского. 1950. pp. 7–77.

=== Guidebooks ===
- Государственный дом-музей П. И. Чайковского в Клину. Путеводитель. Составители К. Ю. Давыдова, С. С. Кутомина, И. Ю. Соколинская, М. В. Суторихина [The State House Museum of P. Tchaikovsky in Klin. Guidebook] (in Russian). М.: Музыка. 1974.
- Davydov, K. Yu. (1980). Государственный дом-музей П. И. Чайковского в Клину [The State House Museum of P. Tchaikovsky in Klin. Guidebook] (in Russian). М.: Музыка. p. 90.
- Дом-музей П. И. Чайковского в Клину. Путеводитель [Tchaikovsky House-Museum in Klin. Guidebook] (in Russian). М.: Государственное музыкальное издательство (Музгиз). 1956. p. 56.
