= Kotomin House =

Historic building in Russia

- Дом Котомина (in Russian)
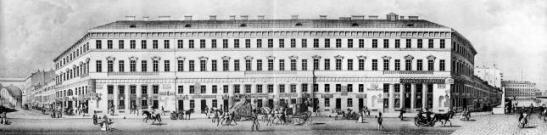
- Lithograph of Kotomin House, 1830
- Interactive map of the Kotomin House area

General information
- Architectural style: Classicism
- Location: Nevsky Prospekt 18, Saint Petersburg, Russia
- Coordinates: 59.936457°N 30.318586°E
- Current tenants: Literary Cafe
- Completed: 1738, 1815

Design and construction
- Architect: Vasily Stasov

Kotomin House (Russian: Дом Котомина) is a historical landmark building located at Nevsky Prospekt 18 (between Bolshaya Morskaya Street and Moika River embankment) in Saint Petersburg, Russia.

== History ==
The first building at the modern location of Nevsky, 18 was constructed at the beginning of the 18th century. It was a small wooden house owned by Cornelius Cruys - the Vice Admiral of the Imperial Russian Navy and the first commander of the Russian Baltic Fleet, close associate of Peter the Great. In 1738 the property passed to tailor Johann Neumann. He hired a famous architect Mikhail Zemtsov to build a new two story stone house. Neumann's house facade faced Moika, and the side to Nevsky Prospekt didn't even have windows. This shows that at the time, Nevsky didn't yet obtain its status of the main street in the Saint Petersburg. The house hosted the museum of wax figures - first in city, although it only existed for one year. Several boutiques operated in Neumann house. In 1743, German merchant Johann Albrecht was selling tableware made from serpentine stone, which supposedly rejected poison (considering the times, it was an attractive proposition). Frenchman Charpentier was selling powder, and Dutch merchant le-Roi had a shop "Rotterdam" selling chocolate, vanilla, and ink.

In 1807, merchant Konon Kotomin bought the land and the property. Kotomin raised to prosperity after being released from serfdom for prince Alexei Kurakin some twenty years earlier. Perhaps a coincidence, but Kotomin has chosen to live right next to prince Kurakin's residence at the time - Chicherin House - across Nevsky Prospekt. Kotomin contracted architect Vasily Stasov to build a palace in place of existing house, as if to compete with his former master. The new house was built in 1812 to 1815, and is mostly preserved in the same form today. The main facade featured a Doric order connecting the two parts of the ground floor. There were eight semi columns in the middle (which did not survive to present time), and a lodge with four columns at each side. At the top, the cornice was decorated with modillions and stucco rosettes.

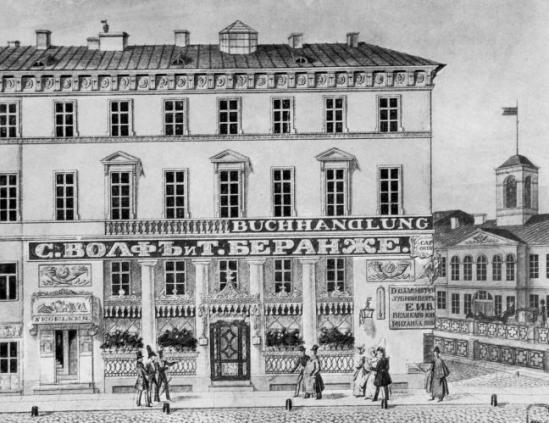
Wolf and Beranget Confectionery at Kotomin House. 1830s Lithograph

Soon after the new building was completed, entrepreneurs Wolf and Beranget opened the confectionery at the first floor. It quickly became very popular, especially for the chocolate eggs with relief scenes dedicated to the victories in the Russo-Turkish war. By the 1820s, a number of magazines and newspapers in Saint Petersburg considered it the best confectioner's shop in the city, described as "temple of kickshaw and prodigality". In 1834, a Chinese cafe (Cafe chinois) was open on the same premises. The place was popular with literati, such as (at different times) Alexander Pushkin, Mikhail Lermontov, Taras Shevchenko, Nikolai Chernyshevsky, Fyodor Dostoevsky, Mikhail Petrashevsky, Ivan Panaev, Aleksey Plescheev and others.

On January 27, 1837, about 4pm, Alexander Pushkin entered Wolf et Beranget Confectionery on his way to duel with Georges d'Anthès. Here he met with his friend Konstantin Danzas, who was to serve as a second at the duel. Pushkin had a glass of water or lemonade (Danzas didn't remember exactly) and they left. In less than an hour, Pushkin was mortally wounded by d'Anthès. A few days later, at the same place Mikhail Glinka read aloud the poem Death of a Poet by young Mikhail Lermontov.

In 1858, a bookshop opened on the ground floor of Kotomin House. It became well known beyond the Saint Petersburg, and existed until 2001. Next to it, Pyotr Elisseeff, the founder of the merchants Elisseeff's dynasty, opened his first store selling "foreign wines and colonial goods".

The confectionery was closed in the late 1840s. In 1877 F. Leiner open a restaurant in the Kotomin House. It was located at the second floor facing the Moika. And while confectionery was frequented by literati, Leiner's restaurant was popular in the theater circles. Its habitués included Mamont Dalsky, Pyotr Tchaikovsky and Fyodor Shalyapin.

According to the legend, on October 20, 1893, Pyotr Ilyich Tchaikovsky asked for a glass of water in the restaurant. "Sorry, we don't have boiled water" was the answer. Tchaikovsky replied - "Then bring the coolest raw water". He was served raw water, and left after single sip. In a few days the composer died from cholera, and rumors swung that the water was poisoned.

In 1978-1981 Kotomin House was reconstructed. The lodges with four columns (previously concealed in 1846) were restored. In 1983 the Literary Cafe opened at the same location as Wolf et Beranget Confectionery. Carrying the tradition, besides being a restaurant, the place also organizes evenings of poetry and Russian romances.
