= Literaturnoye Kafe (Saint Petersburg) =

Historically significant restaurant in Russia

Coordinates: 59°56′11″N 30°19′09″E

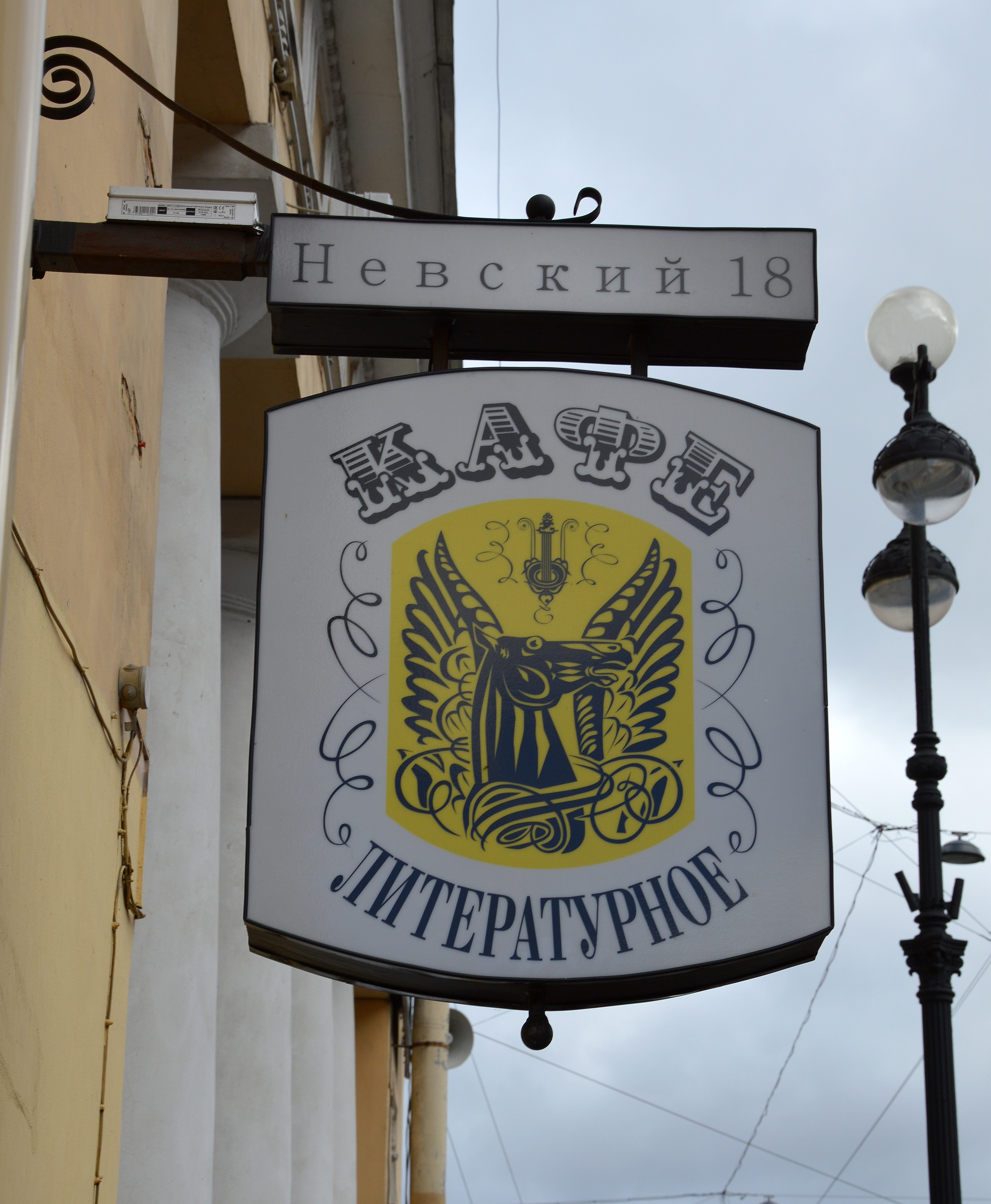
Literaturnoye Kafe in St. Petersburg (2016)

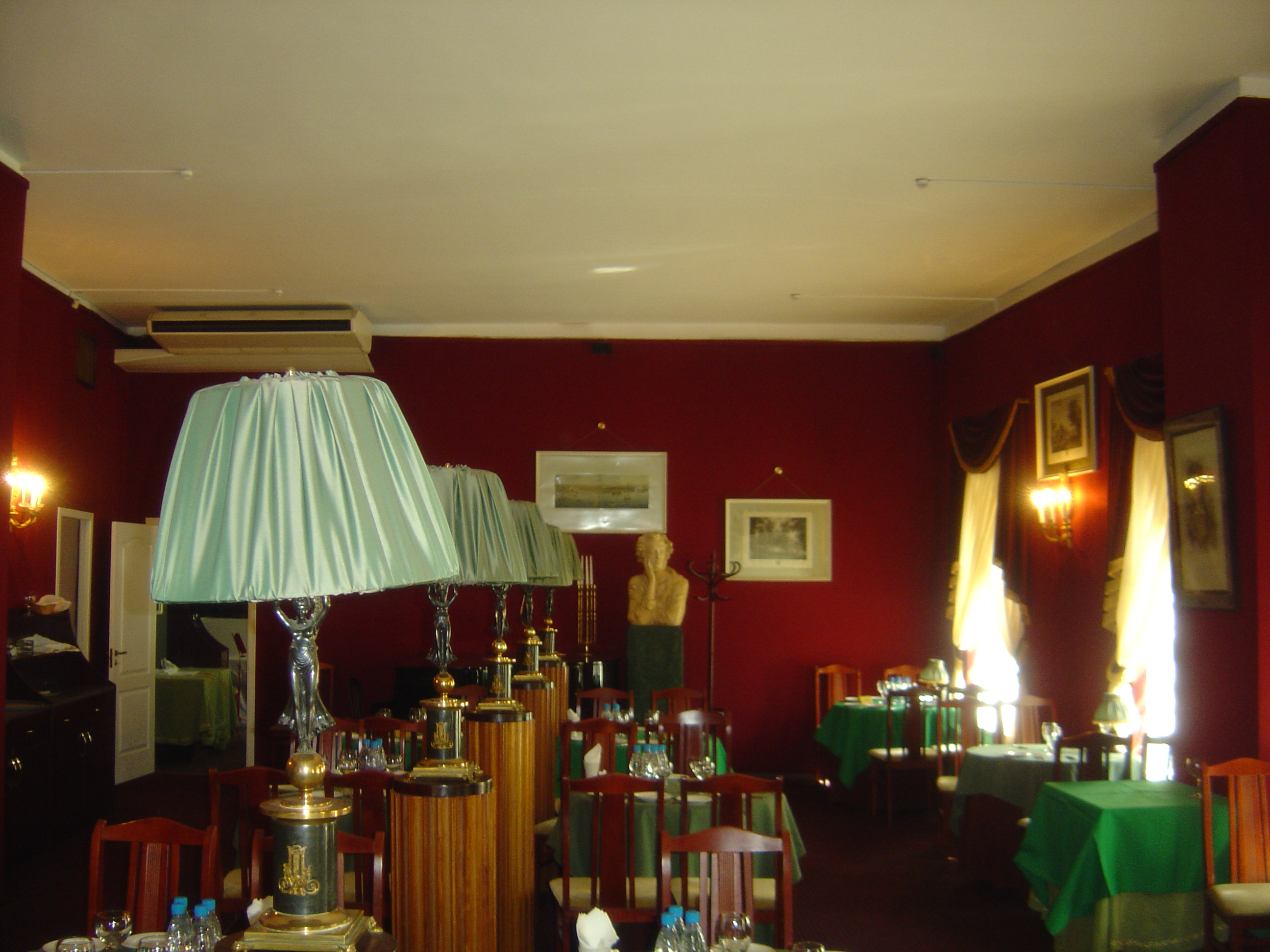
The second floor of Literaturnoye Kafe (2007)

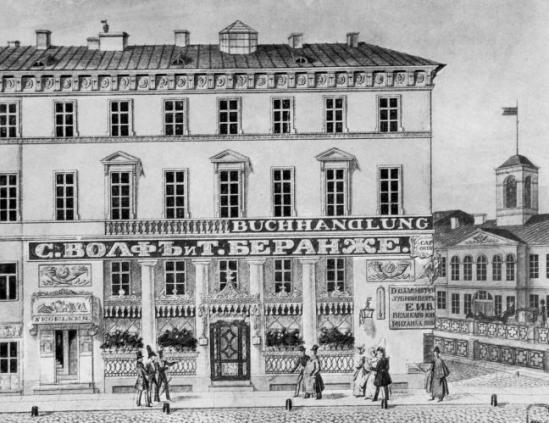
Kotomin House, housing a bookstore and Wolf & Beranget (lithograph in 1830s)

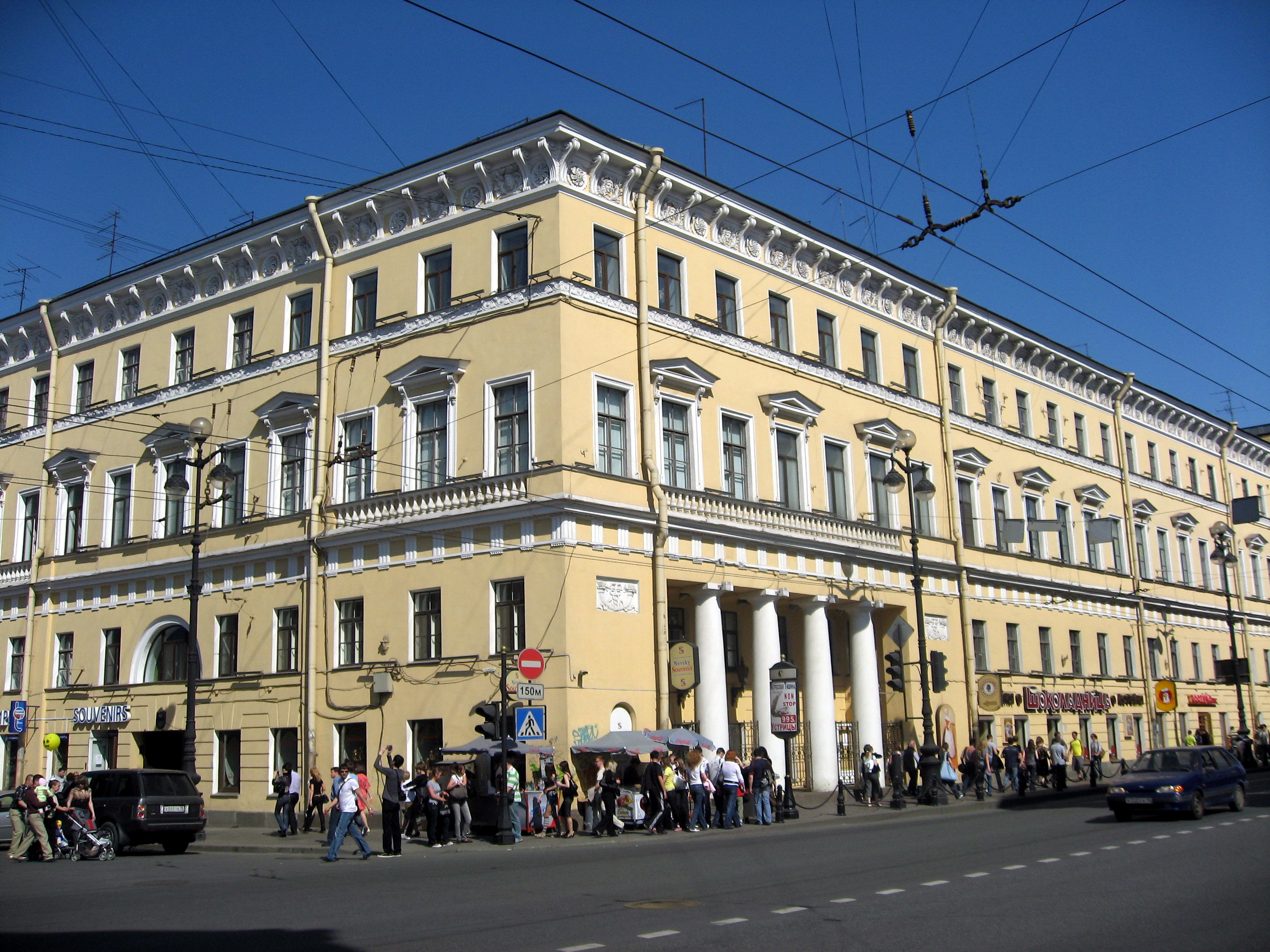
The building at No. 18 Nevsky Avenue (2007)

Literaturnoye Kafe (Russian: Литературное кафе), or Literary Cafe, is a historically significant restaurant on Nevsky Prospect in Saint Petersburg, Russia, that was frequented by famous writers of Russian literature, including Alexander Pushkin and Fyodor Dostoyevsky, and their friends in the nineteenth century.

== History ==
In 1812–14, the mid-18th-century building at 18 Nevsky Avenue in Saint Petersburg, the capital city of Russia at that time, was renovated by K. B. Kotomin as an apartment for merchants (Kotomin House). In this building S. Wolff & T. Beranget opened their confectionery, which was considered the best in St. Petersburg. In 1834, a Chinese café (Café chinois) was added. The confectionery soon became a place where writers of Russian literature, such as Alexander Pushkin, Mikhail Lermontov, Taras Shevchenko, and Fyodor Dostoyevsky, gathered.

In 1837, Pushkin, on the way to his fatal duel with George D'Antès, met his second, Konstantin Danzas, there. In 1840, Dostoyevsky was introduced to Mikhail Petrashevsky, the Utopian socialist, there.

In 1877, after the closure of the confectionery, a high-class restaurant was opened, which musicians such as Pyotr Tchaikovsky and Feodor Chaliapin frequently visited. Tchaikovsky is said to have ordered a cup of water there that turned out to be tainted with cholera, from which he died.

In 1858–2001, the basement of the building was converted into a used bookshop, which became relatively well known. In 1978–81, the building was entirely renovated, and, in 1983, the restaurant reopened under the name of the Literaturnoye Kafe, or Literary Cafe.

== At present ==
Literaturnoye Kafe occupies two floors of the building, with many pictures of Russian writers hanging on its walls. The traditional drink of Russia is not coffee, but black tea. Tea in a samovar can also be served.

== See also ==
- Russian writers of the 19th century
- Russian musicians of the 19th century
- Café Procope (Paris)
- Literary Salons in Russia
