= Green Bridge (Saint Petersburg) =

Road bridge in Saint Petersburg, Russia

Coordinates: 59.9362°N 30.3196°E

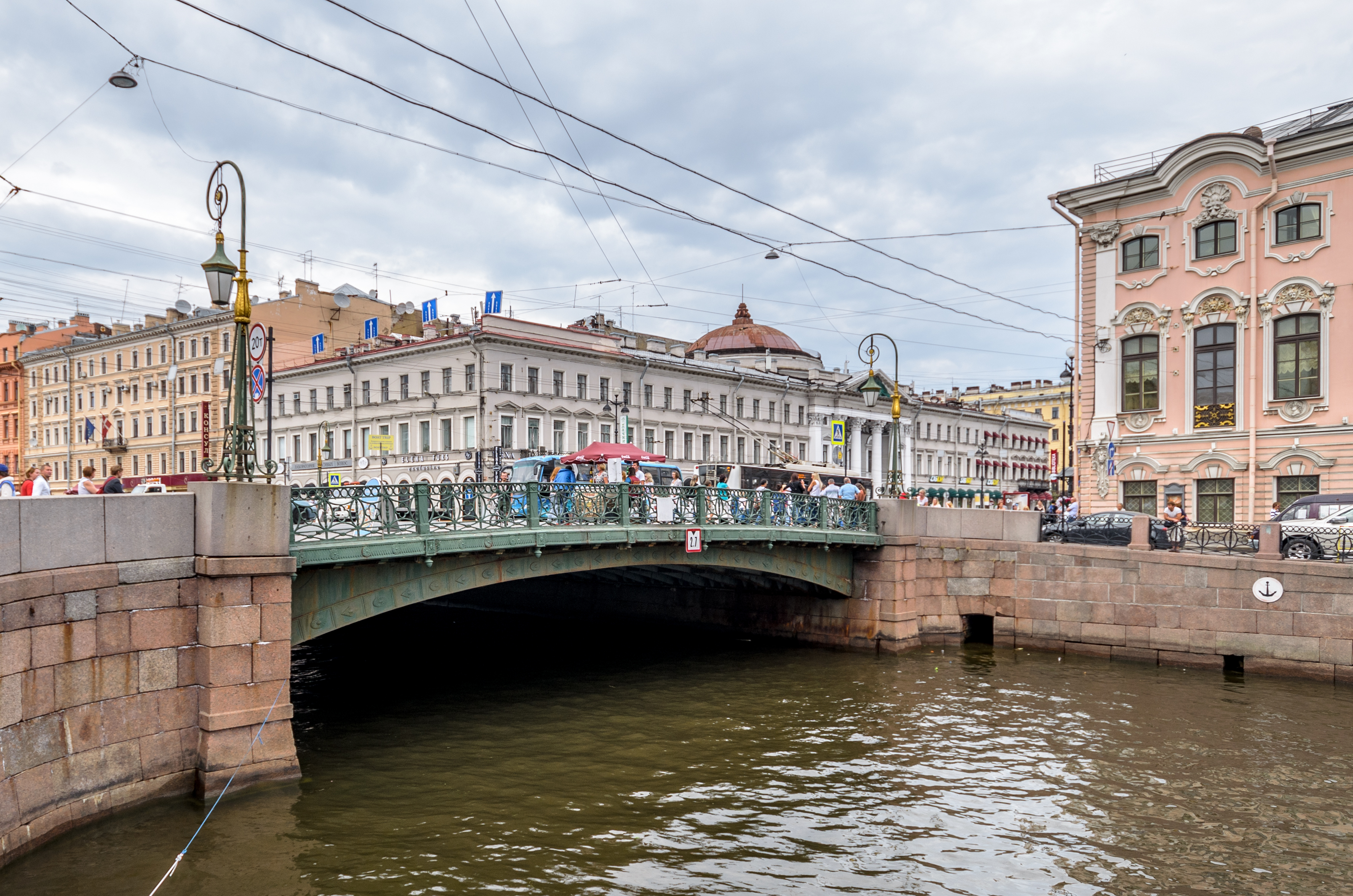
Green Bridge in 2014

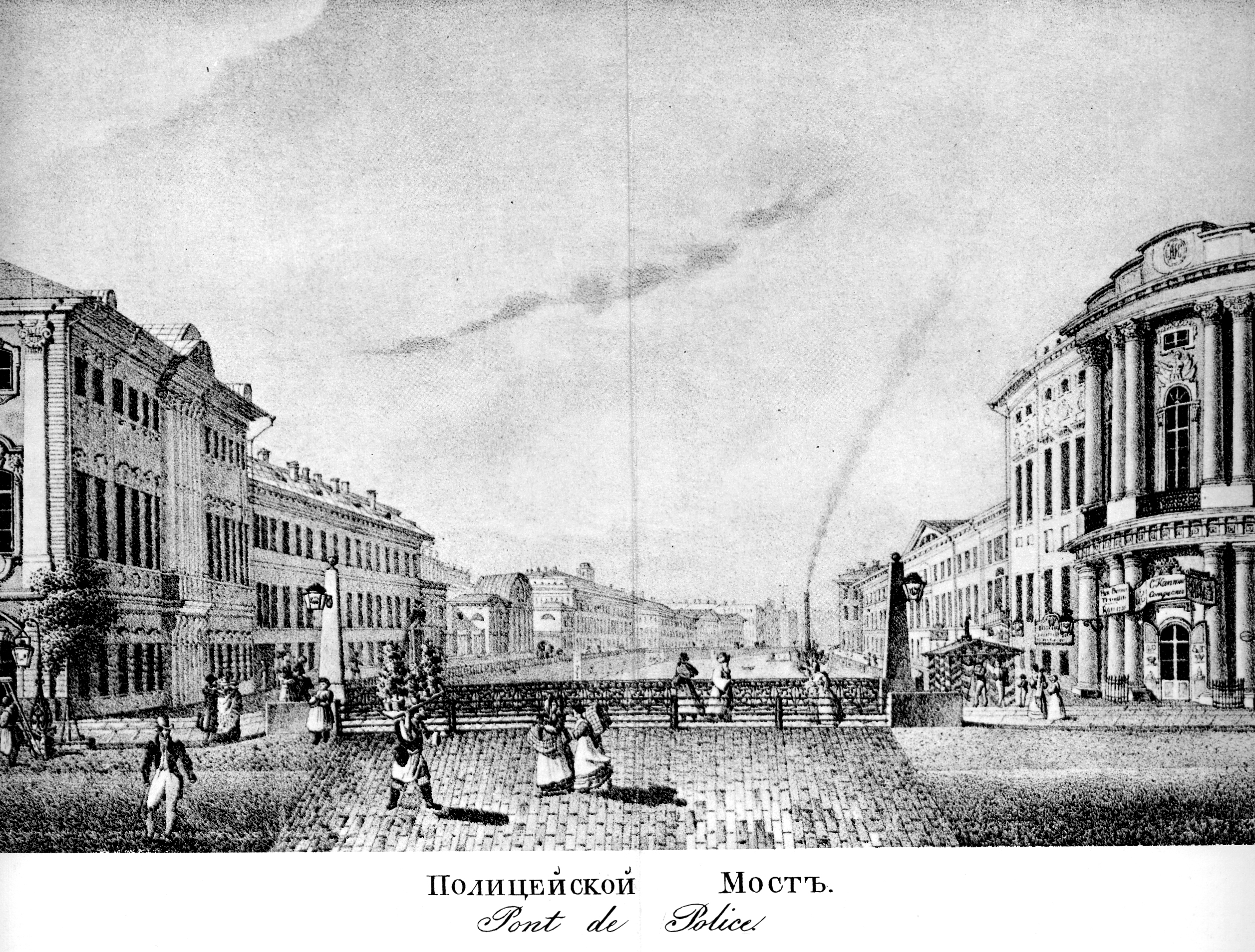
Police Bridge in 1830

Green Bridge (Russian: Зелёный мост, Zyelyoniy Most) (also known as Police Bridge and People Bridge) is a bridge across Moika River in Saint Petersburg, Russia. It was the first cast-iron bridge in the city.

In 1713, there was a major road built on the left bank of Neva river, which became the modern Nevsky Prospekt. At the crossing with Moika, in 1716 the original wooden bridge was built. In 1730 it was painted green, therefore it got the name of Green Bridge. In 1768 the bridge was renamed Police Bridge due to the nearby house of St. Petersburg's police general.

In 1806 in place of the existing bridge, the architect William Heste built a new cast iron bridge. The strength of cast iron allowed a more elegant and lightweight design, especially compared with heavyweight granite bridges. The design was considered so successful, that it was approved as a standard design for bridges across the Moika.

In 1842, the Police Bridge was widened to accommodate growing traffic on Nevsky Prospekt. In 1844 it was the first bridge paved with asphalt in Russia. In 1904–1907, when the tramway tracks were built into the Nevsky Prospekt, the bridge was widened again, and architect Lev Ilyin added street lamps.

In 1918 the bridge was renamed to People Bridge (Russian: Народный мост, Narodniy Most), and in 1998 it was renamed once again back to its original designation, Green Bridge.

== Adjacent buildings ==
Immediately adjacent to the Green Bridge are the Chicherin House, the Kotomin House and the Stroganov Palace.
