= Robert-Aloys Mooser =

Swiss musicologist (1876–1989)

Robert-Aloys Mooser (20 September 1876 – 24 August 1969) was a Swiss musicologist and music critic. He is the author of reference works on the history of the music of Russia.

== Life ==
Born in Geneva, Mooser was the grandson of the famous organ builder Aloys Mooser (1770–1839). His father was a pianist and his mother, Julia Zapolskaya, was of Russian origin. He learned Russian as a child. He learned music (piano and harmony) from his father and organ with Otto Barblan in Geneva. After his father's death in 1899, Mooser went to Russia and worked for ten years in St. Petersburg as a music critic for the French-language publication "Journal de Saint-Pétersbourg". He was also organist at the French Reformed Church, collected musical autographs and began long years of study of Russian music in the city archives. He also took lessons with Balakirev and Rimski-Korsakov.

In 1909, Mooser returned to Switzerland and until 1962 he was a music critic for the Geneva newspaper La Suisse, and for some time its editor-in-chief. In 1915, he founded a cycle devoted to contemporary music, Les auditions du jeudi.

Mooser's articles for La Suisse have been collected in a four-volume publication, successively: Regards sur la musique contemporaine : 1921—1946, Panorama de la musique contemporaine : 1947–1953, Aspect de la musique contemporaine : 1953–1957 and Visage de la musique contemporaine : 1957–1961. In 1922, he founded and directed (until 1944) the musical review Dissonances, of which he was also editor.

His main works are Annales de la musique et des musiciens en Russie au xviiie s. (1951) and Visage de la musique contemporaine (1962), as well as numerous articles on various musicological themes. With Robert Godet, he translated the libretto of the opera Boris Godunov into French.

== Homages ==
In 1932, he was awarded the Silver Medal "Grateful Geneva" following the donation of his music archives to the Geneva Library.

In 1957, he was granted the title of Doctorat honoris causa of the University of Geneva.

Mooser died in Geneva at the age of 92.

== Publications ==
- L'Opéra-comique français en Russie au XVIII : contribution à l'histoire de la musique russe, Genève, René Kistner 1932; 2nd edition, 1955 OCLC 164765520
- Violonistes-compositeurs italiens en Russie au XVIII, Milan 1938–1950
- Opéras, intermezzos, ballets, cantates, oratorios joués en Russie durant le XVIII, Geneva 1945; 2nd ed. Bärenreiter 1955 OCLC 1328977
- Regards sur la musique contemporaine : 1921—1946, Lausanne 1946 — preface by Arthur Honegger
- Annales de la musique et des musiciens en Russie au XVIII, 3 vols. Geneva, Mont-Blanc 1948–1951
  - Des origines à la mort de Pierre III (1762) OCLC 769878733
  - L'époque glorieuse de Catherine II (1762-1796) OCLC 912101126, BnF 324639494
  - Au XVIII, 1796-1801 OCLC 630710422
- Panorama de la musique contemporaine : 1947–1953, Genève 1953
- Aspect de la musique contemporaine : 1953–1957, Genève, Labor et fides 1957 OCLC 459648257 — Preface by Émile Vuillermoz
- Visage de la musique contemporaine : 1957–1961, Paris, Éditions Julliard 1962
- Deux violonistes genevois, Gaspard Fritz (1716–1783) et Christian Haensel (1766–1850), Geneva, Éditions Slatkine 1968
- Correspondance Ernest Ansermet, R.-Aloys Mooser : 1915-1969, Geneva, Georg 1983 OCLC 10431840 — followed by Hommage à Ernest Ansermet, by R.-Aloys Mooser (1969).
- Souvenirs : Genève 1886-1896, Saint-Pétersbourg 1896-1909, Geneva, Georg 1994 OCLC 231675655

== Bibliography ==
- Baker, Theodore; Slonimsky, Nicolas (1995). Baker's Biographical Dictionary of Musicians. Bouquins (in French). Vol. 2 H-O. Paris: Robert Laffont. p. 4728. ISBN 2-221-06787-8. Baker1995..
- The Russian life of R.-Aloys Mooser, music critic to the tsars : memoirs and selected writings. Traduit, édité et présenté par Mary S. Woodside & Neal Johnson. Edwin Mellen Press, 2008. 320 p. ISBN 978-0-7734-5215-2 OCLC 718337249
