= Chicherin House =

Historical building in Saint Petersburg, Russia

- Дом Чичерина (in Russian)
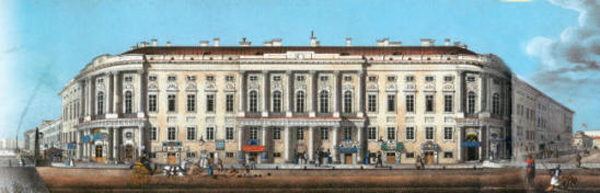
- Lithograph of Chicherin House, 1830
- Interactive map of the Chicherin House area
- Former names: Elisseeff House, Kosikovsky House, Barrikada cinema theater

General information
- Architectural style: Neoclassicism
- Location: Nevsky Prospekt 15, Saint Petersburg, Russia
- Coordinates: 59°56′10″N 30°19′06″E
- Construction started: 1768
- Completed: 1771
- Demolished: 2007

Design and construction
- Architect: possibly Vallin de la Mothe or Yury Felten

Chichrerin House (Russian: Дом Чичерина) was a historical landmark building located at Nevsky Prospekt 15 (between Bolshaya Morskaya Street and Moika River embankment) in Saint Petersburg, Russia. It is also known as Kosikovsky House, Elisseeff House and Barrikada cinema theater.

== Preceding buildings ==
In 1716–1720, the area between the Moika River and Bolshaya Morskaya Street was the site used to build Mytnyi Dvor (Russian: Мытный Двор), a project by Georg Johann Mattarnovy and Nicolaus Friedrich Harbel. This building had a two-story gallery and a tower overlooking the Moyka, and it was commonly called Gostiny Dvor (Russian: Гостиный Двор) (not to be confused with the modern Gostiny Dvor in Saint Petersburg that was built later, in 1757). It was destroyed in a fire in 1736.

After the fire, the site remained empty until 1755, when architect Francesco Bartolomeo Rastrelli constructed a single-story wooden temporary Winter Palace to be a residence for Empress Elizabeth Petrovna while the new permanent Winter Palace was being built. The palace spanned the entire space from the Moyka River to Malaya and Morskaya streets, occupied today by Chicherin House at Nevsky 15 and Chaplin's House at Nevsky 13.

The history of the palace is linked to the history of the first Russian theater. When famous actor Fyodor Volkov was invited to come from Yaroslavl to Saint Petersburg in 1757, he became the director of the Imperial Theater. Performances were held in the palace, in a specially prepared hall. Empress Elizabeth lived in this palace until her death there on December 25, 1762.

== Chicherin House ==
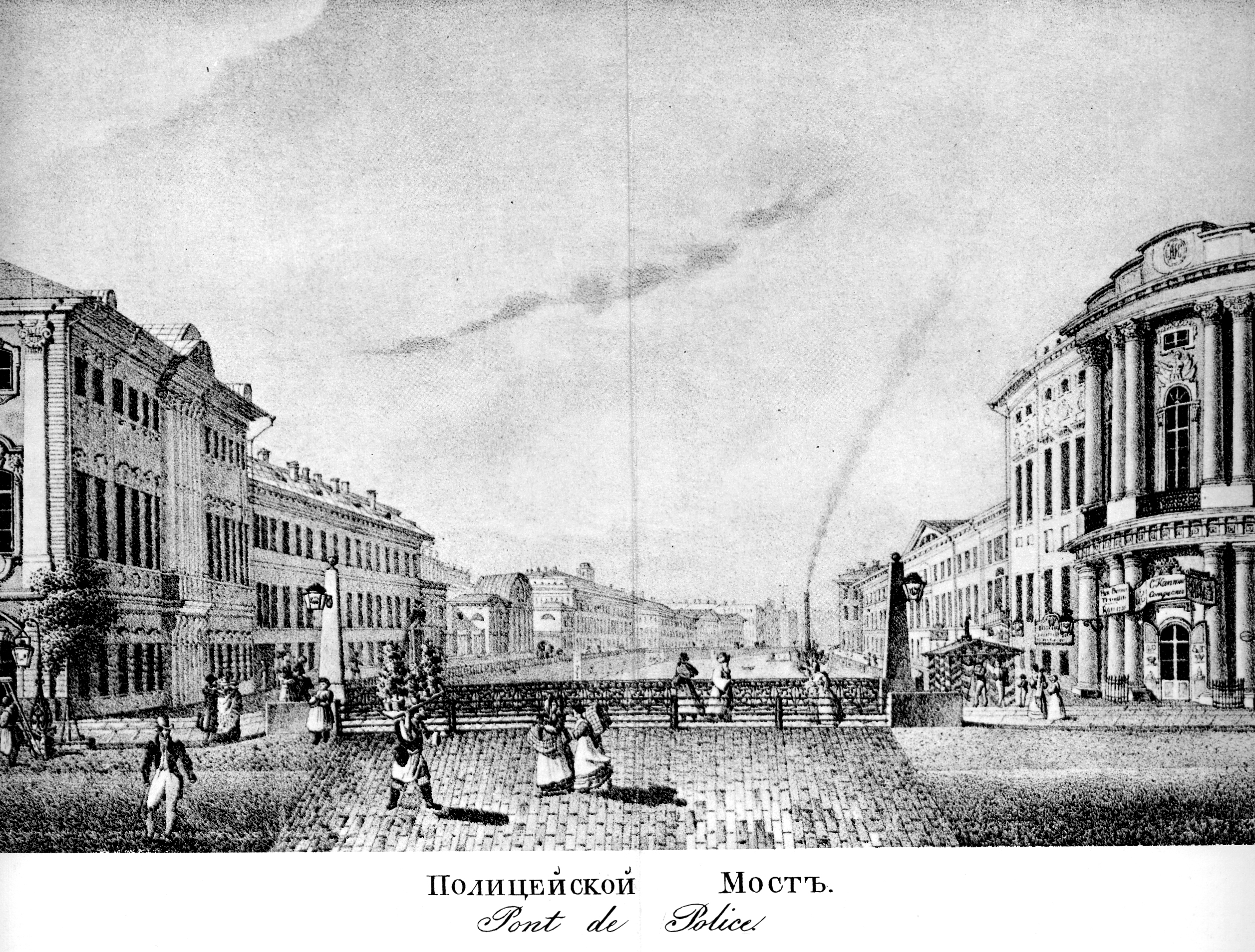
1830s

By 1767 the wooden palace had deteriorated so badly that it had to be demolished. Empress Catherine II gave the vacant land to Nikolai Ivanovich Chicherin, a brother of Denis Ivanovich Chicherin, who was commander of the military unit in which Gregory and Alexey Orlov served. The Orlov brothers helped Catherine rise to the power in a coup. After she became empress, Denis Chicherin was appointed governor of Siberia, and Nikolai Chicherin was appointed chief police general of Saint Petersburg.

Chicherin ordered a house to be built on the site and a four-story building was constructed in 1768-1771. It is not known for certain who the architect was. It has been suggested that it could have been Vallin de la Mothe, Yury Felten, Alexander Kokorinov or Andrey Kvasov. The nearby Green Bridge across the Moyka river was renamed Police Bridge due to its proximity to the police chief's home. The architecture, in rigorous neoclassical style, is a rare example of the corner of a building forming a semicircular arc. The facade on one street flows smoothly into the facade on the intersecting street, in a united ensemble.

Chicherin's family lived in the third floor. The first floor featured various shops including a bookstore. All the other apartments were for rent. One of the tenants in 1780-1783 was Giacomo Quarenghi.

In 1778, Saint Petersburg's second music club opened in Chicherin House, where weekly concerts and masquerades were performed. Attendees included Alexander Radishchev, Denis Fonvizin, Ivan Starov and Fedot Shubin. The club was unable to operate at a profit and was closed in 1792.

== Kurakin House ==
In 1792, Chicherin's children sold the property to prince Alexei Kurakin who lived there since 1792. One of the tenants in the Kurakin's house was Mikhail Speransky. Young Speransky impressed Kurakin with help on a business letter, and was immediately offered a job as the prince's scribe. That was the start of Speransky's spectacular career. In 1800-1806 the owner of the house was Abram Peretz, merchant, prominent financier, ship building contractor and salt supplier.

== Kosikovsky House ==
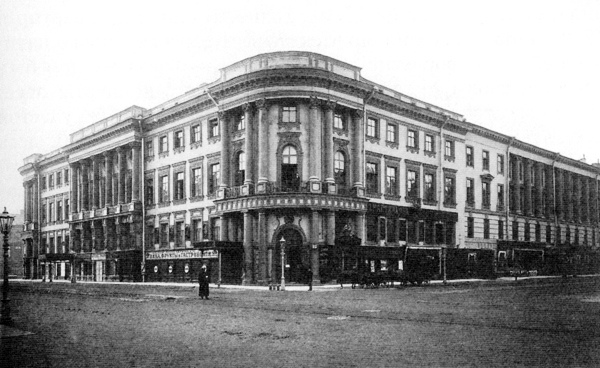
Photo of Chicherin House taken around 1900

From 1806, the ownership passed to merchant Kosikovsky. In 1814-1816 new section of the house was built alongside Bolshaya Morskaya street. Architect Vasily Stasov led this project. The facade of the new section featured twelve columns to commemorate victory in the War of 1812 over Napoleon. In this part of the building, on the first floor Frenchman Pierre Talon open restaurant Talon. Alexander Pushkin used to visit this restaurant, and in his novel in verse Evgeny Onegin he also sent there Onegin himself:

He's flown to Talon's, calculating he is certain that there already waits for him Kavérin

— (A.S.Pushkin. Eugene Onegin (translation Charles Johnston)

To Talon's he has dashed off; that there his friend Kavérin's waiting;

— Literal translation by Vladimir Nabokov

Talon was closed in 1825. At the same time, Alexander Pluchart had established Pluchart's Publishing House and bookstore at Kosikovsky House. That's where Nikolai Gogol's Revisor and Russian translation of Goethe's Faust were first printed. The editorial office of Pavel Svinyin's journal Otechestvennye Zapiski was also located at the building. Publisher Nikolai Gretsch lived in house, and decembrist Wilhelm Küchelbecker stayed at his place in 1825. In 1820th, Vincenco Madenri had a sculpture workshop in the Kosikovsky house. This was where malachite was used for the first time for interior work. In 1828 Russian writer, composer and diplomat Alexander Griboedov rented an apartment in Kosikovsky house. From here he left to Russian consulate in Tehran, where he was killed by a mob during riots.

== Elisseeff House ==
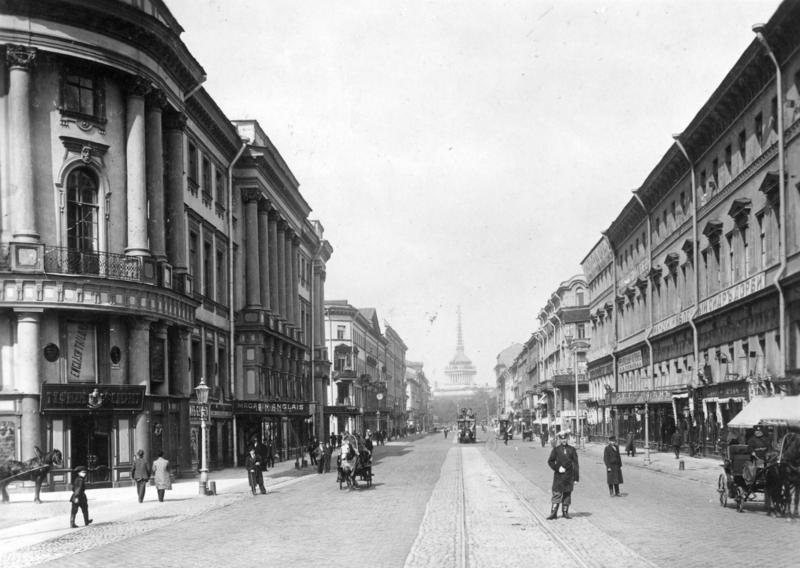
1906

In 1858 the property was acquired by the Elisseeff brothers - two sons of the merchant Elisseeff - the founder of the Elisseeff Trading House. From 1858 to 1870 the building was reconstructed under the project of Nikolai Grebenka. The shape of windows facing Nevsky Prospekt was partially changed, and new section was built on the Moyka side of the building. The Elisseeff brothers were patrons of the arts, and collectors. All Auguste Rodin's sculptures which are in the Hermitage Museum collection were first collected by the Elisseeff family. In 1860 the Elisseeffs opened a 'Salon' in the house, which existed until 1914. Honorable members of the assembly included Pyotr Vyazemsky, Faddei Bulgarin and others. Here, the writers such as Fyodor Dostoyevsky, Ivan Turgenev and Mikhail Saltykov-Shchedrin read their works. In 1886 the Elisseeff House hosted the premiere of Modest Mussorgsky's opera Khovanshchina. In January 1862, count Grigory Kushelev-Bezborodko founded a chess club in the Elisseeff House. Club members included Nikolai Chernyshevsky and Dmitri Mendeleev. However, the police started to get reports, that club members engage in political discussions about constitution and revolution, Chernyshevsky makes speeches, and there is no playing chess. In March of the same year police closed the club.

== House of Arts ==
After 1917 October Revolution, most members of the Elisseeff family fled from Russia. They, however, did not believe that the new rule would last long, so they left everything behind them. The legend has it that they hid most of their treasures in the walls of the house. These treasures were never found. In 1919-1923, Maxim Gorky established House of Arts in the former Elisseeff House. Following fashionable then modernism, it was abbreviated as DISK (from Russian Dom Iskustv - House of Arts). At times of Russian Civil War and post war devastation, apartments were provided artists, writers, poets and composers such as Viktor Shklovsky, Osip Mandelstam, Alexander Grin (who wrote the novel Scarlet Sails here), Olga Forsh (who wrote the novel Palace and Prison here). Korney Chukovsky, Mikhail Zoshchenko, Robert Rozhdestvensky, Kuzma Petrov-Vodkin worked here. House of Arts hosted poet studio led by Nikolay Gumilyov. This is where he was arrested on August 3, 1921 and later executed. During these difficult years the book printing was very limited, and House of Arts plays important role in the cultural life of the city through Literature Evenings. These were gathering where Alexander Blok, Maxim Gorky, Vladimir Mayakovsky, Andrei Bely, Anna Achmatova, Fyodor Sologub and Herbert Wells participated and read their works. Olga Forsh described the life in House of Arts in her novel Crazy Ship.

== Barrikada ==
In 1923, the cinema theater Light ribbon was opened in the building. In 1931 it was renamed as Barrikada. During the 1920s, the young Dmitri Shostakovich, then a student at Leningrad Conservatory, worked as a pianist accompanying the silent films. However, he didn't last long at this job. He was fired as he was distracting the audience from the films with his piano playing. Barrikada remained open even during the Siege of Leningrad. It was screening war documentaries and pre-war movies. The fact that the cinema stayed open during the siege became an important symbol for the city, as well as a source of information. Barrikada operated until the late 1980s. By then the deteriorated condition of the building forced its closure. In 1998 the money for repairs were found and the theatre was open again. In 2006 the building was closed for 'reconstruction'. However, in June 2007, it became known that the historical building was demolished. In place of the original building, a new one was erected, looking similar to the Chicherin House. It is believed that the building had to be re-constructed to allow for a swimming pool to be installed on the roof for the guests staying at the lucrative hotel. The original interiors of the building have been lost in this reconstruction.
