= Konstantin Danzas =

Konstantin Karlovich Danzas
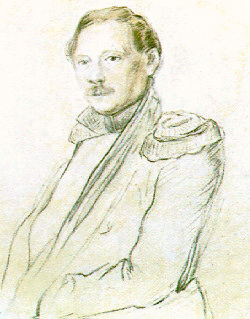
- Native name: Константи́н Ка́рлович Данза́с
- Born: 1801
- Died: February 3, 1870
- Buried: Alexander Nevsky Lavra
- Allegiance: Russian Empire
- Branch: Russian Imperial Army
- Service years: 1817 - 1856
- Rank: Major General

Konstantin Karlovich Danzas (Russian: Константи́н Ка́рлович Данза́с) (1801 – February 3, 1870) was a Russian Major General, a friend of Alexander Pushkin, and his second in a duel with d'Anthès.

Danzas was born to a noble Courland family in 1801. He started his education in Moscow, but at the request of influential family friend, Countess Sofia Stroganova, he was accepted to Tsarskoye Selo Lyceum. Students gave him nickname "Bear". While in the school, Danzas befriended Pushkin. Upon graduation in 1817, Danzas started his military career. Throughout the service Danzas was frequently commended for his outstanding bravery. Among his awards were a golden sword for valor (1828) and a brilliant ring - a very rare decoration for an army officer. Danzas took part in many military campaigns, and in 1828 he was wounded in the left shoulder. He didn't fully recover from this wound, and for the long time was using a sling to support his left hand.

On January 27, 1837, Pushkin asked Danzas to be his second in duel with d'Anthès. Duels were against the law, but being a man of honor, Danzas could not refuse Pushkin. Pushkin was mortally wounded in the duel, and died a few days later. Lying on his death bed, Pushkin said to Zhukovsky and Vyazemsky, "Beg for Danzas. He is my soul brother." Danzas was arrested for his role as second in the duel, and confined to the Peter and Paul Fortress. Initially he was sentenced to death by hanging, but later the sentence was reduced to two months of imprisonment (that was the common practice for Russia at the time). After release, Danzas continued his army service. He asked to be transferred to the Caucasus, and took position of a commander of the Tengin regiment, where Mikhail Lermontov served. Danzas achieved a rank of Major General before he left the army in 1856. He continued to live in solitude, without a family. Over time, he came to blame himself more for Pushkin's death, and this affected his mood. Danzas carefully maintained his own small collection of valuable items related to Pushkin, including Pushkin's death mask, rare letters and a turquoise ring that Pushkin himself gave him. Danzas died on February 3, 1870, alone, and was buried at state expense in the Catholic cemetery. In 1936 his remains were moved to the Tikhvin Cemetery of the Alexander Nevsky Lavra.
