= Cantonist =

Russian conscripts (1721–1857)

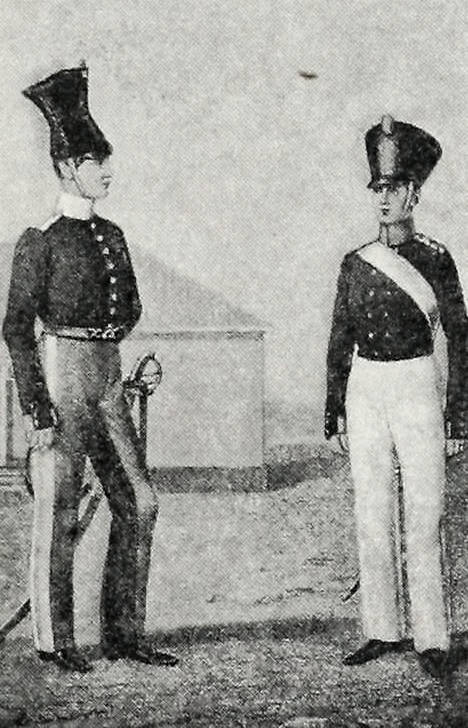
Cantonists

Cantonists (Russian: кантонисты; more properly: военные кантонисты, "military cantonists") were underage sons of conscripts in the Russian Empire. From 1721 on they were educated in special "cantonist schools" (Кантонистские школы) for future military service (the schools were called garrison schools in the 18th century). The cantonist schools and the cantonist system were eventually abolished in 1857, following public and international criticism and the Russian defeat in the Crimean War. The Russian state used the cantonist system as a means to induce the assimilation of its ethnic minority populations, particularly Jews, who were markedly over-represented within the schools.

== Cantonist schools during the 18th and early 19th centuries ==
Cantonist schools were established by the 1721 Tsar Peter the Great's decree, which stipulated that every regiment was required to maintain a school for 50 boys. Their enrollment was increased in 1732, and the term was set from 7 to 15. The curriculum included grammar and arithmetic, and those with a corresponding aptitude were taught artillery, fortification, music and singing, scrivenery, equine veterinary science, or mechanics. Those lacking such talents were taught carpentry, blacksmithing, shoemaking, and other trades applicable to the military. The most able were trained for a further three years, until 18. All entered military service after their studies. The decree of 1758 required all male children of the military personnel to be taught in the cantonist schools. In 1798, a military "asylum orphanage" was established in Saint Petersburg, and all regimental schools were renamed after it, the total enrollment reaching 16,400.

The schools were reorganized in 1805, and all children were now referred to as cantonists. Their number increased dramatically after the French invasion of Russia in 1812, when many orphaned sons of military personnel killed in the war enrolled in canton schools voluntarily. During this period, the curriculum was equivalent to that of gymnasia and military subjects were not taught.

In 1824, all canton schools were made answerable to the Director of Military Settlements, Count Aleksey Arakcheyev, and in 1826, they were organized into canton battalions. Curriculum standards dropped significantly, and subjects were limited to those applicable to the military.

During the reign of Nicholas I of Russia, cantonists reached 36,000. Several canton battalions became specialized: they prepared auditors, artillerists, engineers, military surgeons, and cartographers.

More boys were added to the category of cantonists. Eventually, sons of discharged soldiers, illegitimate sons of soldiers' partners or widows, and even foundlings were included.

There were several exemptions:

1. Legitimate sons of staff officers and all officers awarded the Order of St. Vladimir 4th class.
2. A single son of a junior staff officer, out of a total number of his children, if he had no sons born after he attained the officer's rank.
3. A single son of a junior officer maimed in battle.
4. A single son of a widow of a junior officer or an enlisted man killed in action or deceased during service.

There were considerable differences in cantonists' service obligations:

- Children of nobility were required to serve for three years after their studies.
- Children of senior officers – six years.
- Children of clergy – eight years.
- All other social categories – 25 years.

== Cantonism and ethnic minorities ==
There was forcible conscription of underage recruits from the populations of indigenous peoples, Old Believers, Romani people, and common vagrants from 1805, Jews from 1827, followed by the Poles from 1831.

There were some significant differences in the treatment of Jews and non-Jews: all others were required to provide conscripts between 18 and 35, while for Jews, the age limit was 12–25, and it was left to the discretion of the Jewish qahal to choose conscripts from whatever age they decided. Thus, in practice, Jewish children were often conscripted as young as eight or nine years old. This system created a disproportionate number of Jewish cantonists, and betrayed the utilitarian agenda of the statute: to draft those more likely to be susceptible to external influence, and thus to assimilation.

=== Jews ===
After 1827, the term was applied to Jews and Crimean Karaites, who were drafted to military service at the age of twelve and placed for their six-year military education in cantonist schools. Like all other conscriptions, they were required to serve in the Imperial Russian army for 25 years after the completion of their studies (in 1834 the term was reduced to 20 years plus five years in reserve and in 1855 to 12 years plus three years of reserve). According to the "Statute on Conscription Duty" signed by Tsar Nicholas I on August 26 (September 7 new style), 1827, Jews were made liable to personal military service and were subject to the same conscription quota as all other tax-paying estates ("sosloviya") in the Russian Empire. The total number of conscripts was uniform for all populations (four conscripts per each thousand subjects); however, the actual recruitment was implemented by the local qahals and so a disproportionate number of Jewish conscripts were underage.

In the aftermath of the Polish uprising of 1831, children of political prisoners and boys on the streets of captured cities often were abducted. They placed in cantonist schools, with the intent of their Russification, see Incorporation of Polish children into the Imperial Russian Army (1831–1832) for more.

The vast majority of Jews entered the Russian Empire with the territories acquired as the result of the last partitions of Poland of the 1790s; their civil rights were severely restricted (see Pale of Settlement). Most lacked knowledge of the official Russian language. Before 1827, Jews were doubly taxed en lieu of being obligated to serve in the army and their inclusion was supposed to alleviate this burden. However, the number of recruits reduced the number of young men that could go into the workforce, and this in combination with political restrictions led to widespread destitution.

Russia was divided into northern, southern, eastern, and western "conscription zones" and the levy was announced annually for only one of them. The Pale of Jewish settlement was outside conscription in the fallow years, so the conscription in general and of cantonists in particular occurred once every four years, except during the Crimean War, when conscription was annual. The first 1827 draft involved some 1,800 Jewish conscripts; by the qahal's decision half of them were children. In 1843 the conscription system was extended to the Kingdom of Poland that was previously exempt from it.

==== Strains within the Jewish community ====
The 'decree of August 26, 1827' made Jews liable for military service, and allowed their conscription between the ages of twelve and twenty-five. Every four years, the Jewish community had to supply four recruits per thousand of the population. Strict quotas were imposed on all communities and the qahals were given the unpleasant task of implementing conscription within the Jewish communities. Since the merchant-guild members, agricultural colonists, factory mechanics, clergy, and all Jews with secondary education were exempt, and the wealthy bribed their way out of having their children conscripted, fewer potential conscripts were available; the adopted policy deeply sharpened internal Jewish social tensions. Seeking to protect the socio-economic and religious integrity of Jewish society, the qahals did their best to include “non-useful Jews” in the draft lists so that the heads of tax-paying middle-class families were predominantly exempt from conscription, whereas single Jews, as well as "heretics" (Haskalah-influenced individuals), paupers, outcasts, and orphaned children were drafted. They used their power to suppress protests and intimidate potential informers who sought to expose the arbitrariness of the qahal to the Russian government. In some cases, communal elders had the most threatening informers murdered (such as the Ushitsa case, 1836), see mesirah.

The zoning rule was suspended during the Crimean War, when conscription became annual. During this period the qahals leaders would employ informers and kidnappers (Russian: ловчики, romanized: lovchiki, khappers), as many potential conscripts preferred to run away rather than voluntarily submit. In the case of unfulfilled quotas, younger boys of eight and even younger were frequently taken.

==== Training and pressures to convert ====
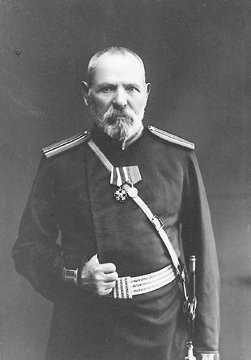
Herzel Yankel Tsam, one of only eight recorded exceptions in the Russian army in the 19th century of Jewish cantonists who rose to the rank of officer without first converting to Christianity. Drafted as a 17-year-old cantonist, he became an officer in 1873. He was not allowed any promotions beyond captain until his retirement after 41 years of service, when he was given rank and pension of a colonel. In spite of pressures, he never converted.

All cantonists were institutionally underfed, and encouraged to steal food from the local population, in emulation of the Spartan character building. On one occasion in 1856, a Jewish cantonist, Khodulevich, managed to steal the Tsar's own watch during military games at Uman. Not only was he not punished, but he was given a reward of 25 roubles for his prowess.

The boys in cantonist schools were given extensive training in Russian grammar (and sometimes literature), and mathematics, in particular geometry necessary in naval and artillery service. Those who showed aptitude for music were trained in singing and instrumental music, as the Imperial Army had a large demand for military wind bands and choirs. Some cavalry regiments maintained equestrian bands of torban players, and cantonist schools supplied these as well. Some cantonist schools also prepared firearms mechanics, veterinarians for cavalry, and administrators ("auditors").

The official policy was to encourage their conversion to the state religion of Orthodox Christianity and Jewish boys were coerced to baptism. As kosher food was unavailable, they were faced with the necessity of abandoning of Jewish dietary laws. Polish Catholic boys were subject to similar pressure to convert and assimilate as the Russian Empire was hostile to Catholicism and Polish nationalism. Initially conversions were few, but after the escalation of missionary activities in the cantonist schools in 1844, about one third of all Jewish cantonists would have undergone conversion.

=== Other groups ===
In the era of Arakcheev's military settlements (1809–1831), indigenous peasants who fell within the territory of a military settlement were subject to incorporation into the military in various ways. In particular, indigenous children (under the age of 18) were considered military cantonists and divided into three age groups: minor (under the age of 7), middle (ages 8–12), and senior, with the latter group assigned to the military school of the settlement. Minors stayed with the parents, while minor orphans were transferred to military settlers, with an award of 10 roubles. All male newborns automatically became cantonists. Later it turned out that instead of 11 years, 8 years of military training were enough. Correspondingly, the age groups were changed: under 10, under 14, and under 18.

In the aftermath of the Polish uprising of 1831, children of political prisoners and boys on the streets of captured cities were often abducted, and placed in cantonist schools for Russification: see Incorporation of Polish children into the Imperial Russian Army (1831–1832) for more.

== In the army ==
For all cantonists, their 25-year term of service began after they reached the age of 18 and were recruited into the army.

Discriminatory regulations ensured that unconverted Jews were held back in their army promotions. According to Benjamin Nathans,

... the formal incorporation of Jews into Nicolas I's army was quickly compromised by laws distinguishing Jewish from non-Jewish soldiers. Less than two years after the 1827 decree on conscription, Jews were barred from certain elite units, and beginning in 1832 they were subject to separate, more stringent criteria for promotion, which required that they "distinguish themselves in combat with the enemy."

Jews who refused to convert were barred from ascending above the rank of "унтер-офицер" i.e. NCO; only eight exceptions were recorded during the 19th century. These restrictions were not lifted until the February Revolution in 1917.

Some baptized cantonists eventually reached high ranks in the Imperial Army and Navy; among them were generals Arnoldi, Zeil; admirals Kaufman, Sapsay, Kefali.

=== Literary references ===
The cantonists' fate was sometimes described by Yiddish and Russian literature classics.

Alexander Herzen in his My Past and Thoughts described his somber encounter with Jewish cantonists. While being convoyed to his exile in 1835 at Vyatka, Herzen met a unit of emaciated Jewish cantonists, some eight years old, who were marched to Kazan. Their (sympathetic) officer complained that a third had already died.

Nikolai Leskov described underage Jewish cantonists in his 1863 story "The Musk-Ox" (Ovtsebyk).

Judah Steinberg described underage Jewish cantonists in his novel "In Those Days" (English translation in 1915, from the Hebrew).

The agony of Polish children incorporated into the Imperial Russian Army was presented in Juliusz Słowacki's narrative poem Anhelli.

== Abolition and results of cantonist policy ==
The cantonist policy was abolished by Tsar Alexander II's decree on 26 August 1856, in the aftermath of the Russian defeat in the Crimean War, which made evident the dire necessity for the modernisation of the Russian military forces. Nonetheless, the drafting of children lasted through 1859. All unconverted cantonists and recruits under the age of 20 were returned to their families. The underage converted cantonists were given to their godparents. However the implementation of the abolition took nearly 3 years.

It is estimated that between 30,000 and 70,000 Jewish boys served as cantonists, their numbers were disproportionately high in relation to the total number of cantonists. Jewish boys comprised about 20% of cantonists at the schools in Riga and Vitebsk, and as much as 50% at Kazan and Kiev schools. A general estimate for the years 1840–1850 seems to have been about 15%. In general Jews comprised a disproportionate number of recruits (ten for every thousand of the male population as opposed to seven out of every thousand), the number was tripled during the Crimean War (1853–1856).

At the conclusion of the conscription term, former cantonists were allowed to live and own land anywhere in the Empire, outside the Pale of Settlement. The earliest Jewish communities in Finland were Jewish cantonists who had completed their service. The rate of conversion was generally high, at about one third, as was eventual intermarriage. Most never returned to their homes.

== Statistics ==
Jewish cantonist recruits in 1843–1854, according to statistics of the Russian War Ministry. Only in the eleven years listed below – the total of 29,115 children were conscripted. Basing on these data, it was estimated that between 1827 and 1856, there were over 50,000 of them.

- 1843 – 1,490
- 1844 – 1,428
- 1845 – 1,476
- 1846 – 1,332
- 1847 – 1,527
- 1848 – 2,265
- 1849 – 2,612
- 1850 – 2,445
- 1851 – 3,674
- 1852 – 3,351
- 1854 – 3,611

== See also ==
- 1917 film: "The Cantonists" (Кантонисты), historical drama, by director and screenwriter Alexander Arkatov

=== Military training of children ===
- Devşirme system
- Janissary
- Garrison school
- Suvorov Military School
- Nakhimov Naval School

=== Extra burdens on the Jews ===
- Abstinence (conscription)
- Jizya – tax
- Leibzoll – tax
- More Judaico
- Tallage

== Bibliography ==
- 2008 YIVO encyclopedia http://www.yivoinstitute.org/downloads/Military_Service.pdf
- Simon Dubnow, The Newest History of the Jewish People, 1789-1914 Vol. 2 (Russian ed. ISBN 5-93273-105-2) pp. 141–149, 306-308
- CANTONISTS, by Herman Rosenthal at Jewish Encyclopedia, 1901–1906
- Benjamin Nathans, Beyond the Pale: The Jewish encounter with late imperial Russia (University of California Press, Berkeley, CA. 2002). pp. 26–38
- Petrovsky-Shtern, Yohanan (2008). Jews in the Russian Army, 1827-1917: Drafted into Modernity. Cambridge University Press. ISBN 978-0521515-73-3.
- Larry Domnitch, The Cantonists: The Jewish Children's Army of the Tsar (Devora Publishing, 2004). ISBN 1-930143-85-0
