= Abstinence (conscription) =

Abstinence (Hebrew: הִסתַגְפוּת, Ashkenazi pronunciation: Histagfus) was a form of draft evasion and a form of hunger strike (or other forms of self-harm, such as sleep deprivation, tending to cause tachycardia, or self-inflicted wound) employed by young men in the Russian Empire's Jewish Pale of Settlement (and in the neighbouring Austrian Empire's Galicia) in order to be found unfit for military service by the Imperial authorities.

== Russian Empire ==
The "Abstention" resistance by self-harm was most extreme in the Russian Empire under the Cantonist system implemented for Jews from 1827 to 1856, but self-harm actions continued afterward. A secret 1835 report by the chief of the Special Corps of Gendarmes in Vilnius expressed the government's difficulty in preventing self-mutilations.

The phenomenon was covered in the Russian Hebrew press, and Ha-Melitz warned against the practice as violating Jewish law as well as Russian law. The phenomenon of self-induced hernia received attention in the Journal of the American Medical Association in 1891.

Just before World War I, the Jewish author and folklorist S. Ansky conducted an ethnographic survey of Russian Empire regions of Volhynia and Podolia and devoted a section of his large questionnaire to conscription-related cultural practices.

== Austrian Empire ==
Concription among Jews in Galicia was introduced by Joseph II in 1788.

In some Galician communities like Tlumach, Liuboml, Kalush), deprivation efforts among young men became a rite of passage, and fasting during the day was followed by communal all-night sessions of excessive caffeine, excessive exercise, chain smoking and sometimes taking on a pranking Mischief Night character.

== See also ==
- Segula
