= Self-inflicted wounds in the military =

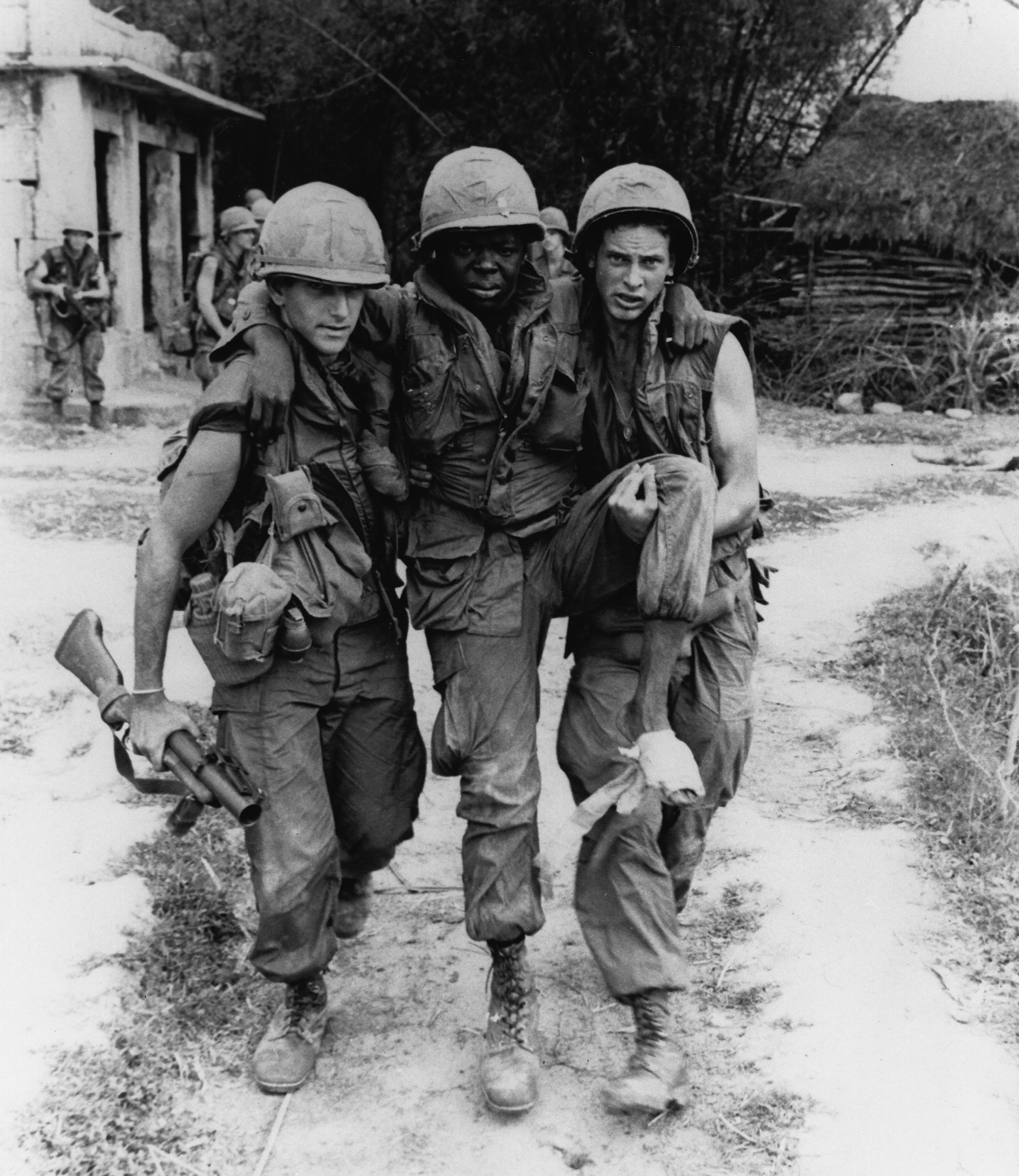
An American soldier being evacuated after intentionally wounding himself during the My Lai massacre

Self-inflicted wounds occur in various contexts in the military. Most self-inflicted wounds occur during wartime, for various reasons. Potential draftees may self-injure to have a health deferment to conscription. This was practiced as conscription abstinence by some Jewish conscripts in the Russian Empire. Deployed soldiers may injure themselves in order to be temporarily evacuated from the front lines for treatment, and possibly receive a medical discharge.

In prisons and forced labour camps, people sometimes self-injure to avoid forced labor and spend time in the relatively less stressful conditions of the infirmary or barracks.

== Types of wounds ==
Common wound types include gunshots to the extremities. A person may achieve a similar effect by deliberately neglecting their health, e.g., by letting a minor wound become infected, or foregoing foot care in damp environments to trigger the development of diseases like trench foot and tropical ulcers, which are debilitating but not usually fatal or permanent if treated properly.

== Punishments ==
In most militaries, deliberately injuring oneself is a serious offense. Most self-inflicted wounds go unrecognized, though consequences are usually severe if caught, sometimes carrying the death penalty.

In the British Army during the First World War, the maximum penalty for a self-inflicted wound ("Willfully maiming himself with intent to render himself unfit for service", as it was described) under Section 18 of the Army Act 1881 was imprisonment, rather than capital punishment. In the British Army, 3,894 men were found guilty and were sent to prison for lengthy periods.

In Nazi concentration camps, self-injury was dangerous as the incapacitated were often just executed, but in some lower-stringency camps it has indeed been documented.

== History ==
Many self-inflicted wound reports during World War I placed soldiers under suspicion for injuries that could have been genuine accidents. During World War II, almost all armies (in particular, the Soviet Army and the Wehrmacht) had cases of self-inflicted injury. During the meeting of high commanders of the Soviet Army after the Winter War, it was mentioned that a single regiment had 105 cases after a single day of fighting.
