= Andrey Voronikhin =

Russian architect and painter (1759–1814)

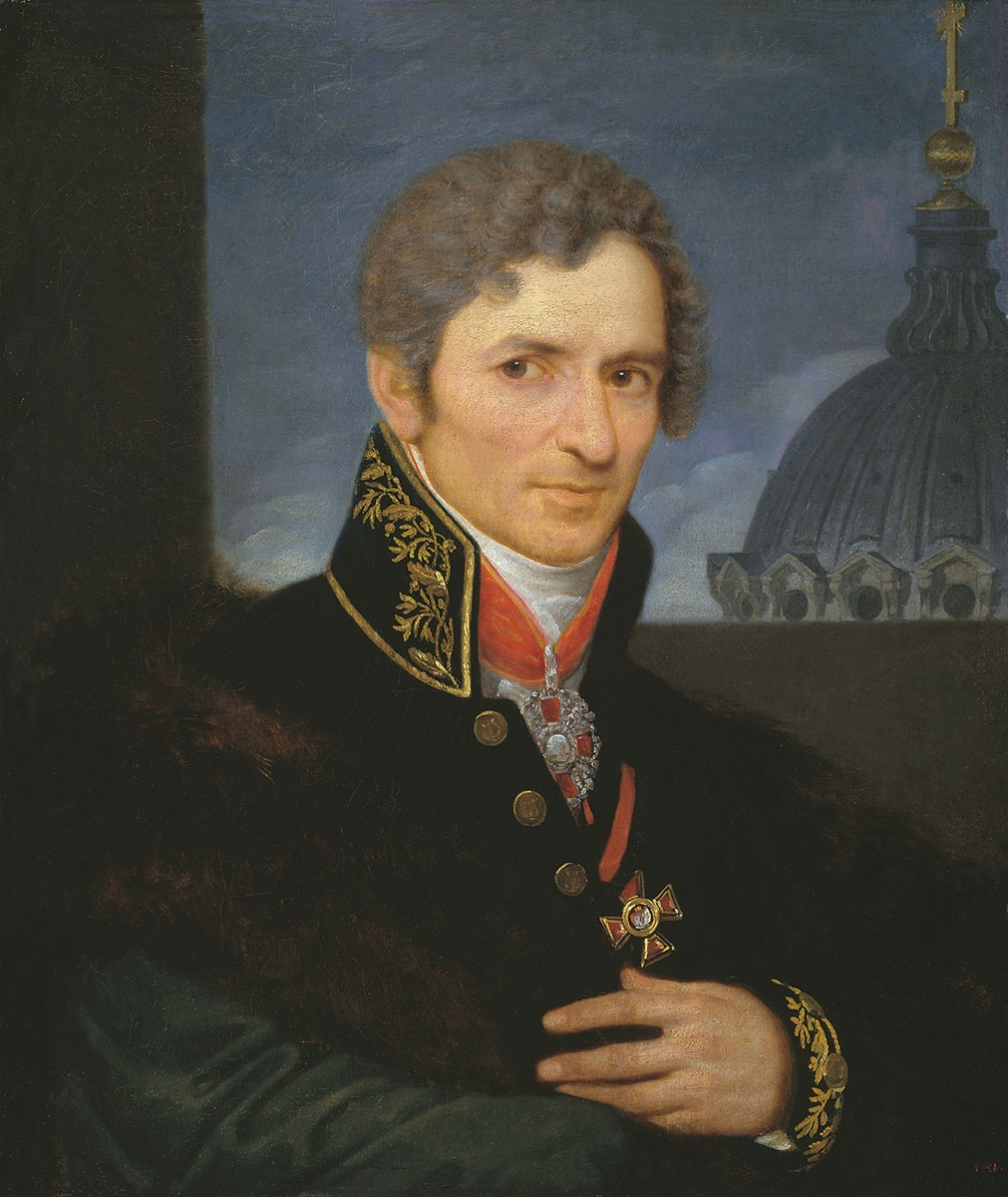
Portrait of Andrey Voronikhin. Engraving by V. A. Bobrov from the beginning of the 19th century.

Andrey (Andrei) Nikiforovich Voronikhin (Russian: Андрей Никифорович Воронихин; 28 October 1759, Novoe Usolye, Perm Oblast – 21 February 1814, Saint Petersburg) was a Russian architect and painter. As a representative of classicism he was also one of the founders of the monumental Russian Empire style. Born a serf of the Stroganov family, he is best known for his work on Kazan Cathedral in Saint Petersburg.

Andrey Voronikhin was born in the village of Novoa Usolye (now Perm Krai) to a family who were the serfs of count Alexander Sergeyevich Stroganov, a longtime President of the Imperial Academy of Arts. It is generally believed that he was fathered by Alexander Stroganov. Voronikhin trained in painting in the workshop of Ural icon painter Gabriel Yushkov. The talents of his youth attracted Stroganov's attention, and in 1777 the count sent Voronikhin to study in Moscow. Among his teachers were Vasili Ivanovich Bazhenov and Matvey Fyodorovich Kazakov. After 1779 Voronikhin worked in Saint Petersburg.

In 1785, Voronikhin was liberated. From 1786 through 1790 he studied architecture, mechanics and mathematics in France and Switzerland.

In 1797, the artist obtained the academic title of «перспективной живописи» from the Academy of Fine Arts for the pictures «Вид картинной галереи в Строгановском дворце» (1793, Hermitage) and «Вид Строгановской дачи» (1797, Russian museum, Saint Petersburg). From the beginning of the 19th century he taught at the Academy of Fine Arts.

The earliest architecture of Voronikhin includes finishing the interiors of Stroganov Palace (1793). The magnificent baroque forms, proposed by Rastrelli, were replaced by Voronikhin with a strict classical order, characterized by simplicity and refinement. Furthermore, he reconstructed the interiors of the Stroganov Dacha on the Black River (1795 - 1796), and also built estates in Gorodnya (1798).

The main creation of Voronikhin was Kazan Cathedral in Saint Petersburg. The construction began on 27 March 1801, and work was finished in 1811. On the occasion of renovating the temple, Voronikhin was granted a pension and the order of St. Anna of the second degree.

A number of other works of Voronikhin were the house of the Department of the Treasury, the building of the Saint Petersburg Mining Institute, the colonnade of the Peterhof, and palaces in Strelna, Gatchina and Pavlovsk.

The architect died on 5 March 1814 in Saint Petersburg.

Voronikhin's nephew, Nikolay Ilyich Voronikhin, was an architect based in Ryazan. He inherited Andrey Voronikhin's archive; Ascension Cathedral in Kasimov (photo) by Nikolay Voronikhin is remotely based on Andrey Voronikhin's unrealized draft for Cathedral of Christ the Saviour in Moscow.

== Bibliography ==
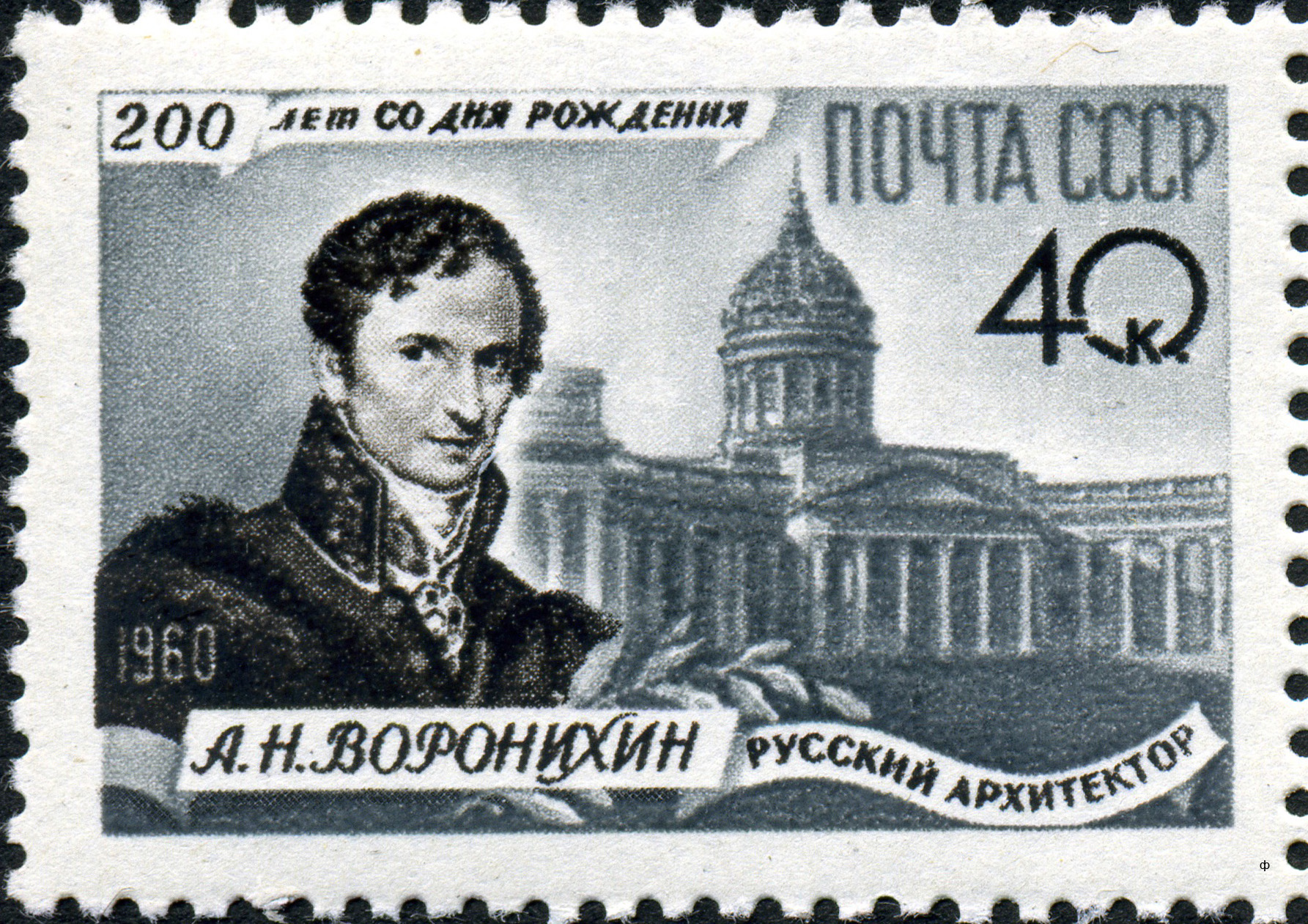
A 1960 U.S.S.R. stamp commemorating the bicentennial of Voronikhin's birth.

- Гримм Г. Г., Архитектор Воронихин. — Л. — М.: Гос.изд. литературы по стр-ву, арх-ре и стр. материалам, 1963
- Лисовский В. Г., Андрей Воронихин. — Л.: Лениздат, 1971 (Серия: Зодчие нашего города)
- Панов В. А., Архитектор А. Н. Воронихин, М., 1937;
- Шуйский В.К. Андрей Воронихин // Зодчие Санкт-Петербурга. XIX – начало XX века / Сост. В.Г. Исаченко. – СПб., 2000. – С. 19-38.
- Кузнецов С. О. Диалог Франческо Растрелли и Андрея Воронихина в истории Строгановского дворца в кн.: Новейший путеводитель по Строгановскому дворцу. СПб., 1995 и в кн.: Архитектура мира. Материалы конференции «Запад-Восток: Искусство композиции в истории архитектуры». Ред.-сост. Н. Смолина. М., 1996. С. 44-51.
- Кузнецов С. О. Новые материалы о творчестве Андрея Воронихина в первой половине 1790-х годов // Петербургские чтения 99. Ред. коллегия под пред. Т. А. Славиной. СПБ., 1999. С.555-559.
- Кузнецов С. О. Греческий сад графа Строганова // Русская галерея. 2000. № 1-2. С.74-77.
- Кузнецов С. О. «Сочинить хорошенький кабинет». Собрание дома Строгоновых // История Петербурга. 2001. № 2. С.66-71
- Кузнецов С. О. Дворец и его архитекторы // Наше наследие. 2001 № 59-60. С.34-45 [1]
- Кузнецов С. О. Строгановская дача: «Одиссея на Черной речке» // Наше наследие. 2002. № 61. С.15-20 [2]
- Кузнецов С. О. Братцево // Там же. С.39. [3]
- Кузнецов С. О. Казанский собор // Три века Санкт-Петербурга. Энциклопедия в трех томах. Том II. Девятнадцатый век. Книга третья. К-Л. СПб., 2004. С.36-38.
- Кузнецов С. О. Прорубить окно на восток. Алхимический зал Строгоновского дома // Реликвия. 2005. № 4. С.44-49.
- Кузнецов С. О. Не хуже Томона. Государственная, меценатская, собирательская деятельность рода Строгоновых в 1771—1817 гг. и формирование имперского облика С.-Петербурга. СПБ.: Нестор, 2006—447 с. — ISBN 5-303-00293-4
- Кузнецов С. О. Дворцы и дома Строгоновых. Три века истории.. — М-СПб: Центрполиграф, МиМ-Дельта, 2008. — 319 с. — ISBN 978-5-9524-3471-4
- Olga Medvedkova, Mémoire de l'architecte V***, Paris, TriArtis, 2015.
