= Antonio Peresinotti =

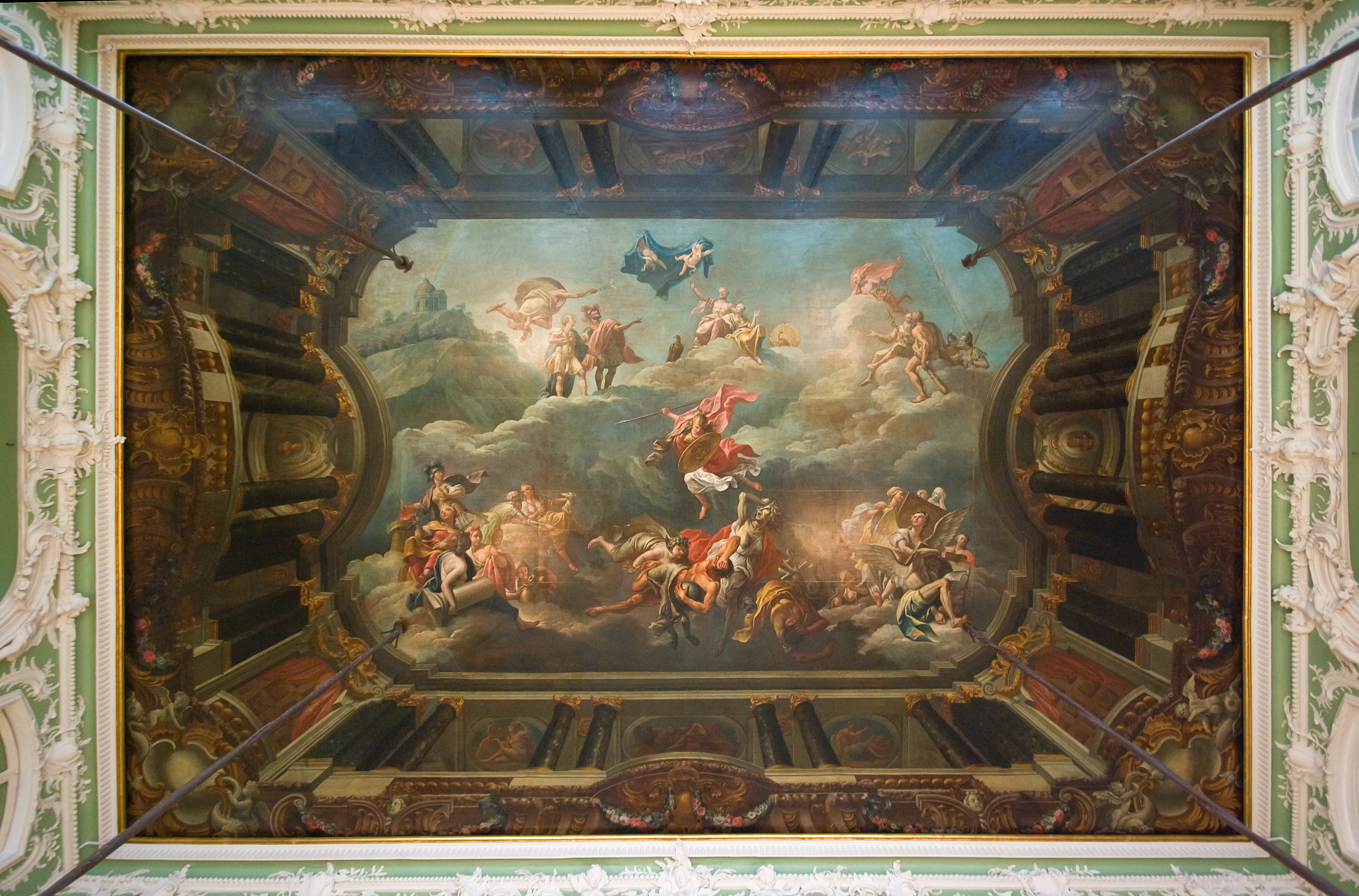
Plafond at Stroganov Palace. The decorative framing is by Peresinotti and the central figures are by Valeriani

Antonio Giovanni Battisto Peresinotti (Russian:Антонио Перезинотти; 1708, Bologna - 28 October 1778, Saint Petersburg) was an Italian-born Russian painter and academician who taught decorative art and perspective at the Imperial Academy of Arts.

== Biography ==
He was apprenticed to the decorative painter, Girolamo Bon (c. 1700–1766). Bon and his new wife Rosa (a comic opera singer) went to Saint Petersburg in 1735, where he had been offered work as a scenic designer. In 1742, Bon invited two of his former students, Peresinotti and Giuseppe Valeriani to join him there. Peresinotti eventually advanced from being a theater painter to working for the Imperial court. He worked on several major projects; including murals at Anichkov Palace, several murals and designs for a new theater at the Winter Palace (1749-1765), and murals for the Catherine Palace (1753-1755), and the Small Hermitage (1765-1769).

While there, he also took several students. The engraver, Fyodor Zadubsky worked with him from 1748 to 1754. The landscape painter, Ivan Tankov, was his apprentice from 1756.

In 1766, he was appointed to the Imperial Academy and began teaching classes there. He received the title of "Academician" in 1767 and became a member of the Council of Professors. He was especially fond of depicting ruins, and often assigned his students to paint them. His most famous student there was Fyodor Alekseyev.

Most of his work has not been preserved. Only two stand-alone paintings are known, both landscapes with ruins, on display at the academy's museum. Wall paintings at the Peterhof Palace are also notable.
