= Herzel Yankel Tsam =

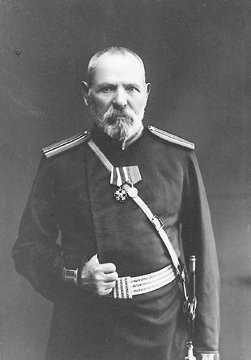
Herzel Yankel Tsam in the uniform of a capitan of the RIA

Herzel Yankel Tsam (Russian: Герцель Янкелевич Цам, Gertsel Yankelevich Tsam; 1835–1915) was a Jewish military officer in the Russian Empire, one of only nine Jewish officers in the Russian army in the 19th century who didn't convert to Christianity.

Drafted as a 17-year-old cantonist, Tsam served in Tomsk, Siberia. Tsam became an officer in 1873 (his fellow officers attested to his qualities in the promotion petitions) and, after forty-one years of service, he was retired with a rank and pension of captain. The promotion was granted on the day of his retirement, so he would have the pension, but wouldn't be able to serve as a captain. An able commander and administrator, he turned one of the worst companies of his regiment into one of the best.

After retirement, Tsam took an active part in the Jewish community of Tomsk..

== See also ==
- History of the Jews in Russia and the Soviet Union
