= Conscription of Polish children into the Imperial Russian Army =

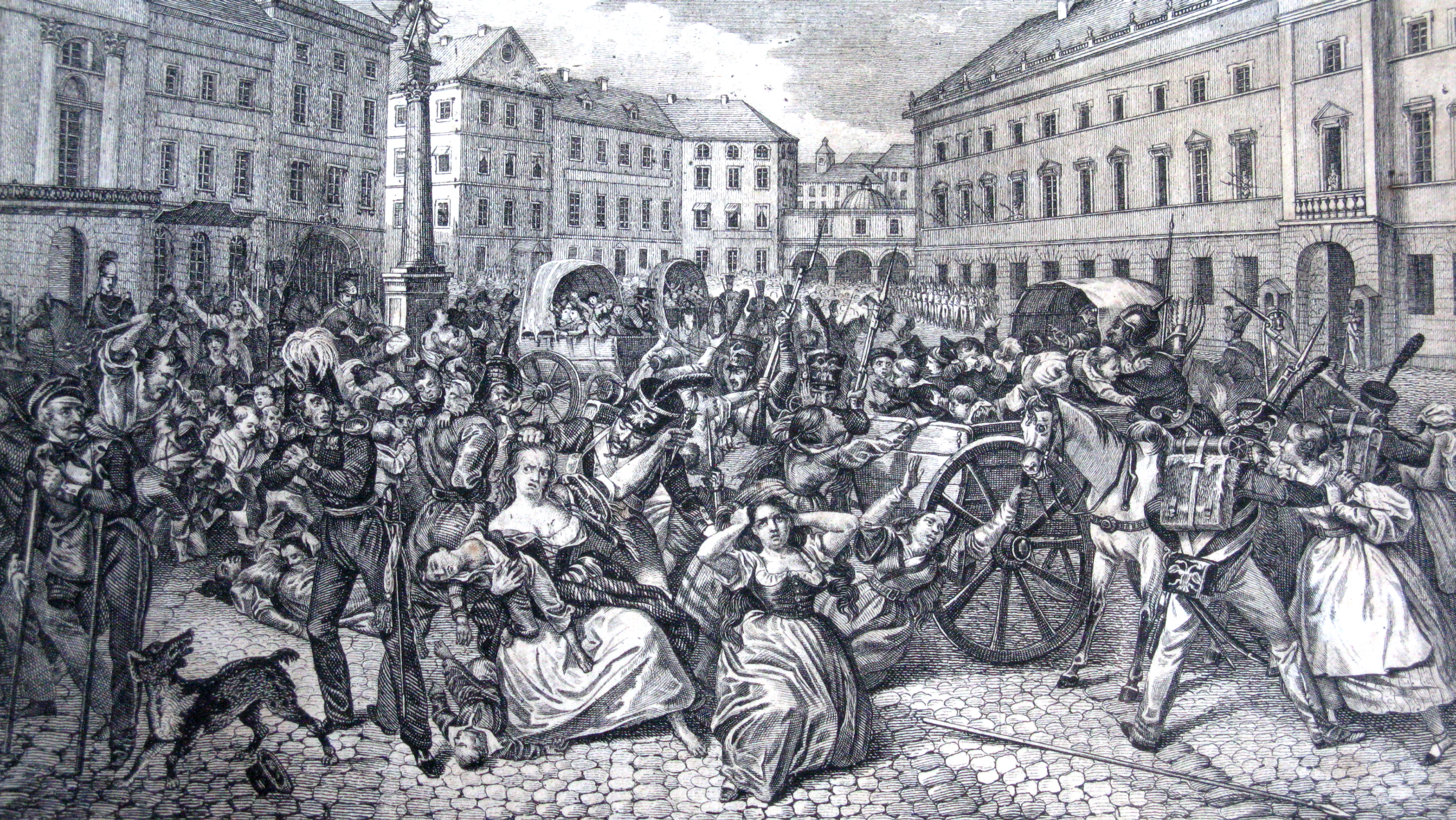
Russian soldiers capturing Polish children at Castle Square in Warsaw

Polish adolescents were conscripted into the Imperial Army of the Russian Empire during and after the defeat of the November Uprising (1830–1831).

In March 1831, in accordance with Tsar Nicholas I, the children of those who took part in the November Uprising were treated as cantonists and conscripted into special battalions of the Imperial Russian Army. A March 24, 1832 ukase ordered the assignment to special children's battalions of adolescent boys, 7 to 16 years of age, children of political exiles, orphans, those of the poor and homeless. Several thousand children were taken.
