= Khapper =

Kidnappers of recruits for the Russian army

Khappers were Russian Jews employed by the Kahals to fulfill the recruit quotas imposed on the Jewish communities from 1827 to 1857 in the Russian Empire. Tsar Nicholas I created these recruit quotas because he viewed military service as a way to russify Jews, whom he held in low regard, by teaching them the Russian language and converting them to Russian Orthodox Christianity.

Khappers were employed to kidnap Jewish boys (sometimes as young as eight) to fill a quota of Jews required to enter the cantonist schools, in preparation for service in the Russian Army, in the situations where such quotas were not filled legally, due to attempts by the families to hide their children. The term is a 19th-century colloquialism that comes from the Yiddish word for grabber, in itself a borrowing from Ukrainian "хапати" (khapaty, to grab).

== See also ==
- Cantonist
