= Stroganov Palace =

Russian imperial palace

Coordinates: 59.935742°N 30.320774°E

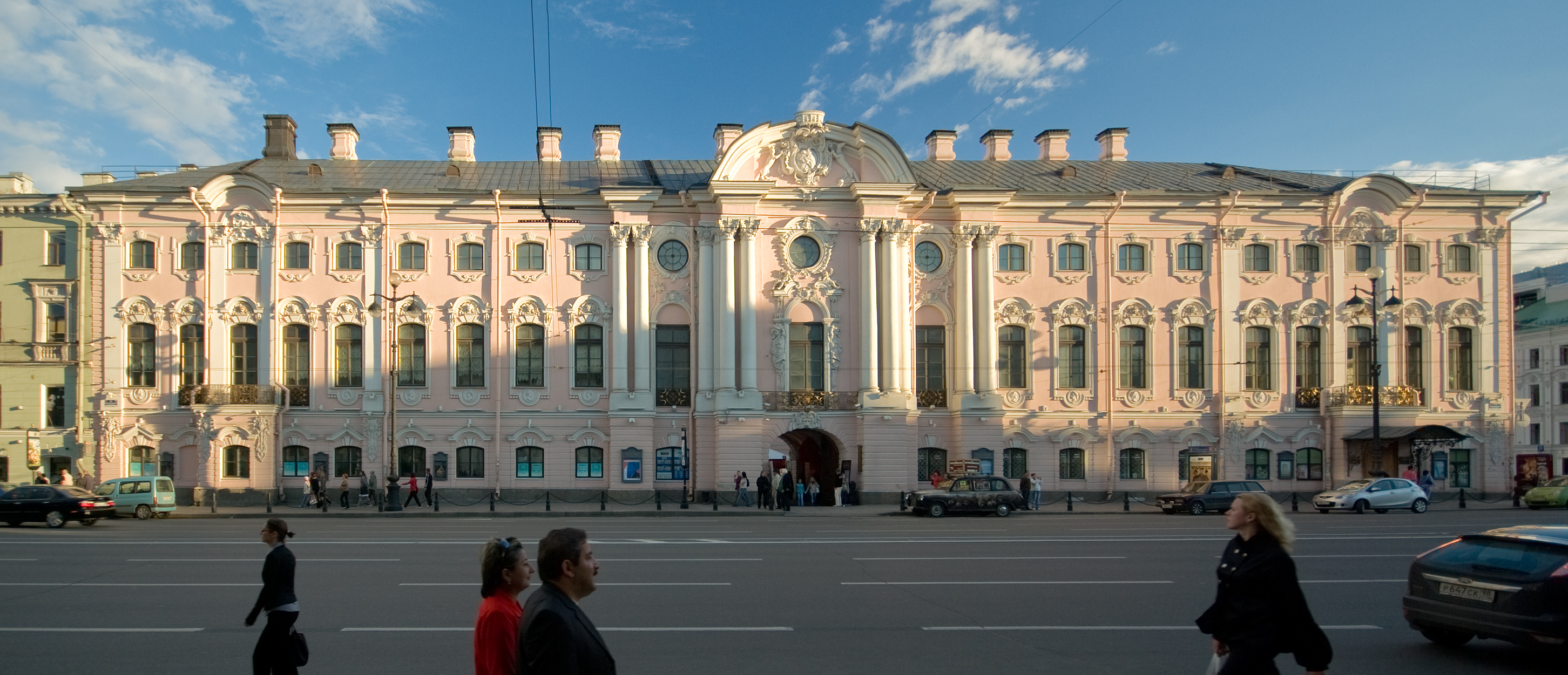
View of the Stroganov Palace from Nevsky Prospekt

The Stroganov Palace (Russian: Строгановский дворец) is a Late Baroque palace at the intersection of the Moika River and Nevsky Prospect in St. Petersburg, Russia. The palace was built to Bartolomeo Rastrelli's designs for Baron Sergei Grigoriyevich Stroganov in 1753–1754. The interiors were remodeled by Andrei Voronikhin at the turn of the 19th century.

== History ==
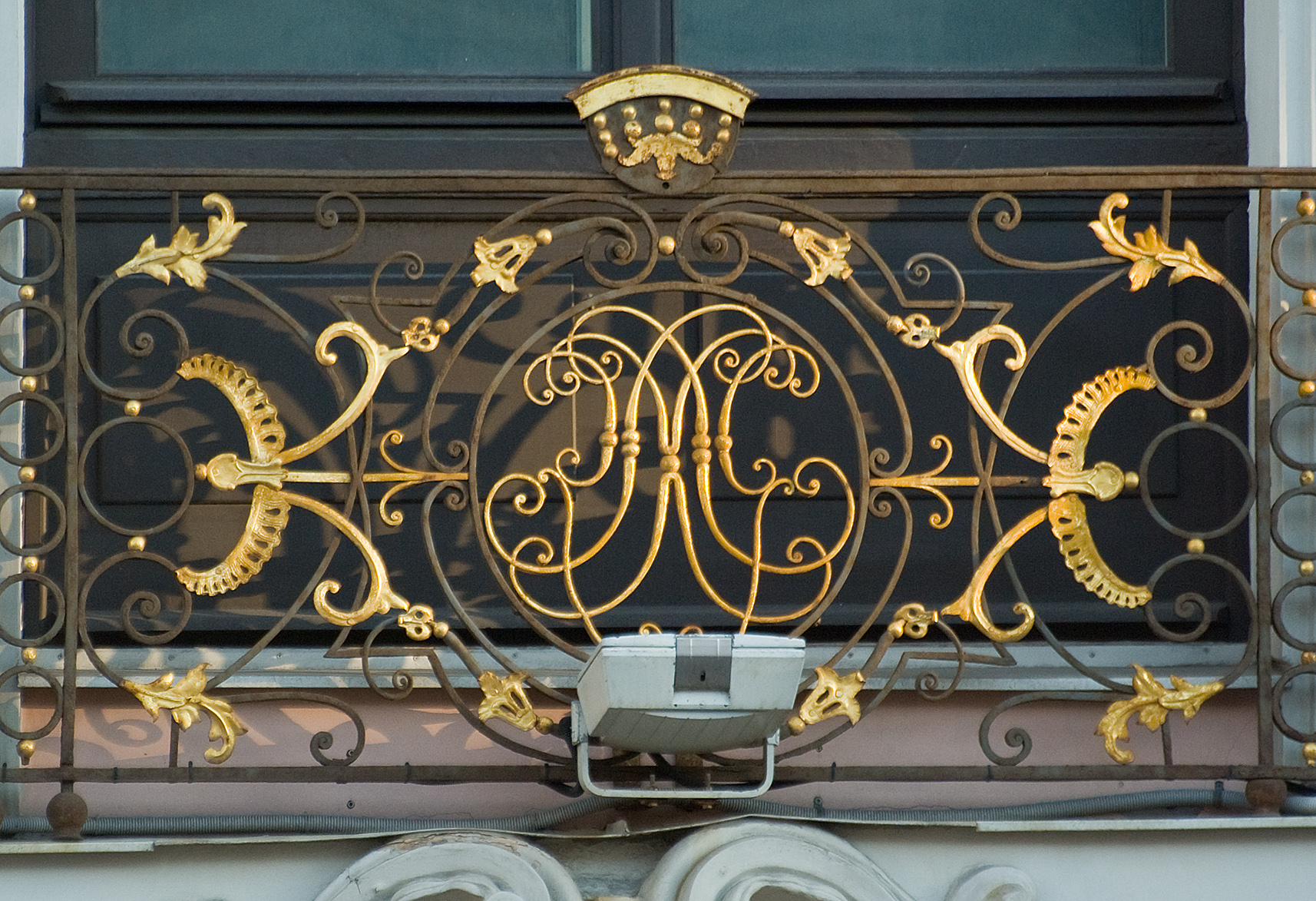
The initials of the first owner.

The first house for the Stroganovs was built on the site probably in the 1720s. It was a one-storey building. Architect Mikhail Zemtsov erected a second, two-storey house on the site in the 1740s.

In 1752, Baron Sergei Stroganov commissioned the palace design from Italian architect Bartolomeo Rastrelli, then at work extending the Catherine Palace and building the Smolny Convent for Empress Elisabeth. Since the Stroganovs were the richest family in Russia and were related to the Empress by marriage, Rastrelli could not turn down the commission and hastily prepared a design for the townhouse.

Like the Vorontsov Palace (also designed by Rastrelli for Stroganov's in-law Mikhail Vorontsov), the Stroganov Palace was not rapidly built.

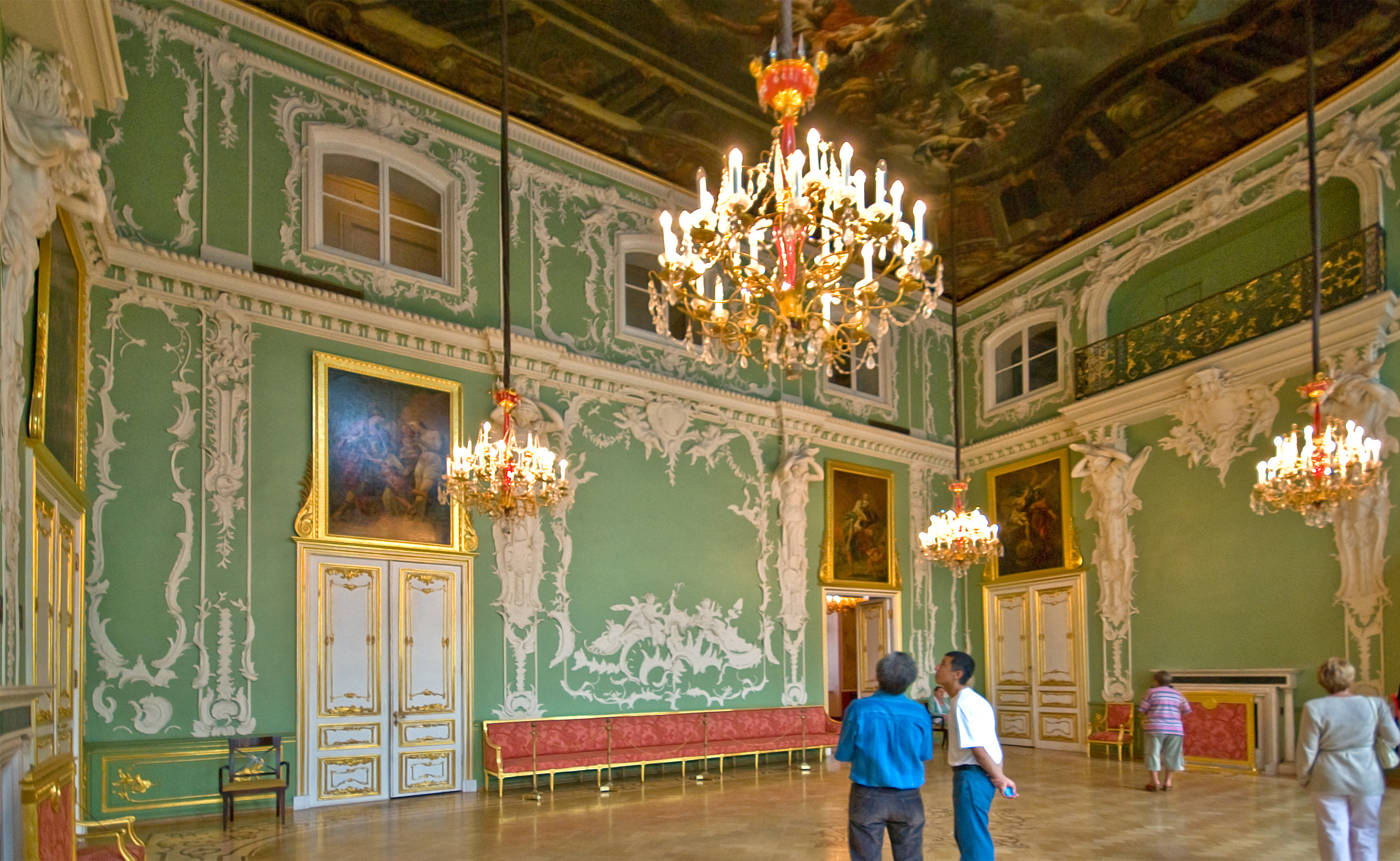
Great Hall

In the 1790s and 1800s decades, architect Andrei Voronikhin was charged with refurbishing the interiors in Neoclassical style. Voronikhin's mother was the Stroganovs' serf, and it was rumored that his father was Alexander Stroganov.

After Alexander Stroganov died in 1811, the palace passed to his son Pavel. Pavel Stroganov had four daughters, but his only son was killed in the Battle of Craonne. He then established the Stroganov entail, i.e., a non-divisible estate which would pass to the oldest family member. This chain of ownership was preserved until 1919 when the last Count Sergei Stroganov sold his rights to the entail. A new apartment was decorated for Aglaida Pavlovna Stroganov by Carlo Rossi in 1820 (it later disappeared almost totally). After the October Revolution in 1917, the remaining Stroganovs emigrated from Russia, and the palace was nationalized. The family line is now extinct.

The Soviets declared the palace a national museum chronicling the lifestyle of the Russian nobility. In 1929 the museum was shut down, and much of its contents (including some priceless paintings and objets d'art) were taken to the Hermitage Museum. The palace was handed over to a botanical institute. The Ministry of Shipbuilding occupied the premises for half a century, starting in 1939.

In 1988 the palace was given to the Russian Museum and became a branch housing some of its exhibitions. The dilapidated building underwent a thorough and painstaking restoration process between 1991 and the present moment. In keeping with Rastrelli's original design, its walls are now painted light pink (rather than dark green, as they were in the mid-20th century). It is one of the few Baroque structures on Nevsky Prospect to preserve its original appearance.

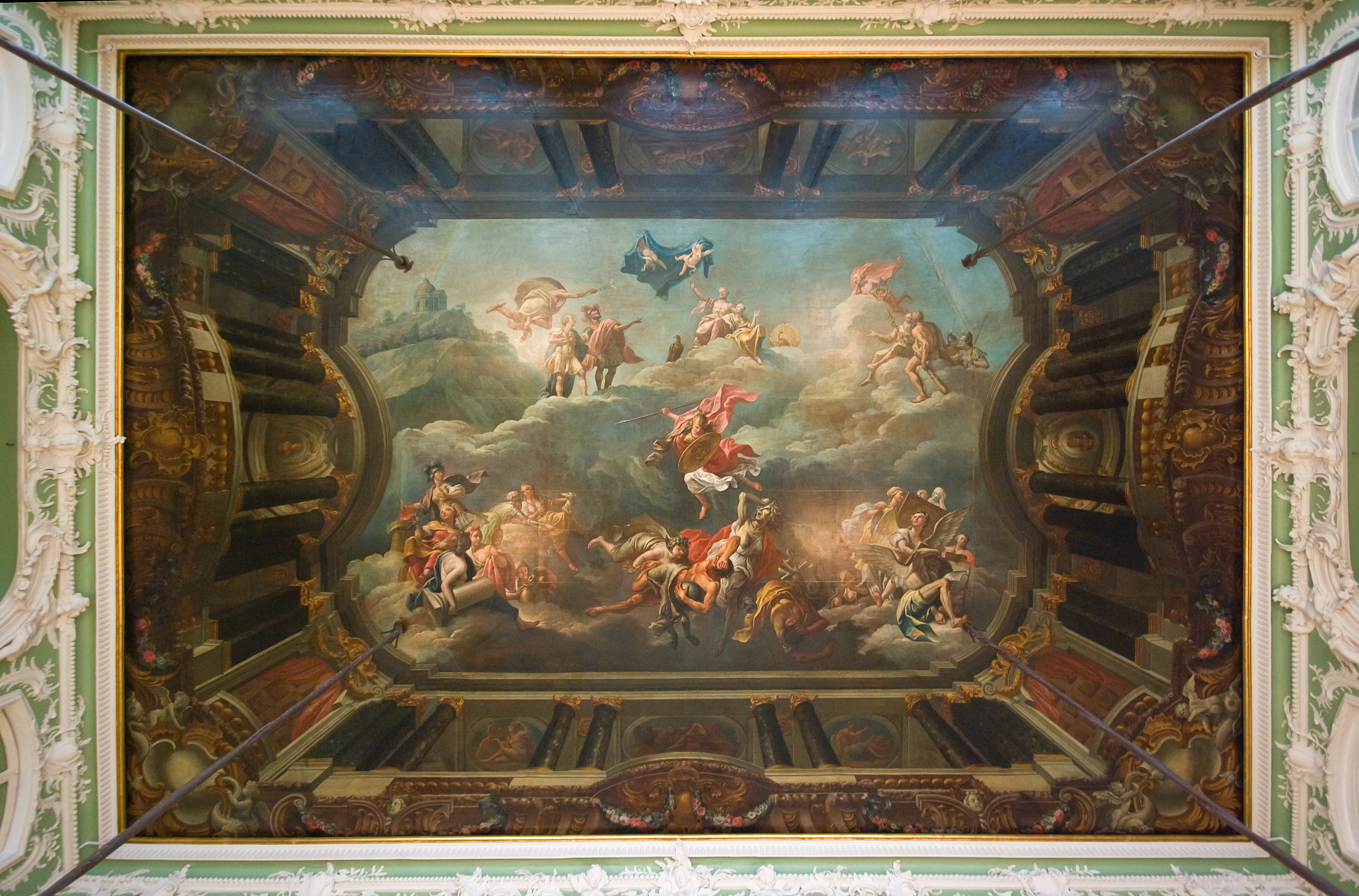
A frescoed ceiling by Giuseppe Valeriani and Antonio Peresinotti

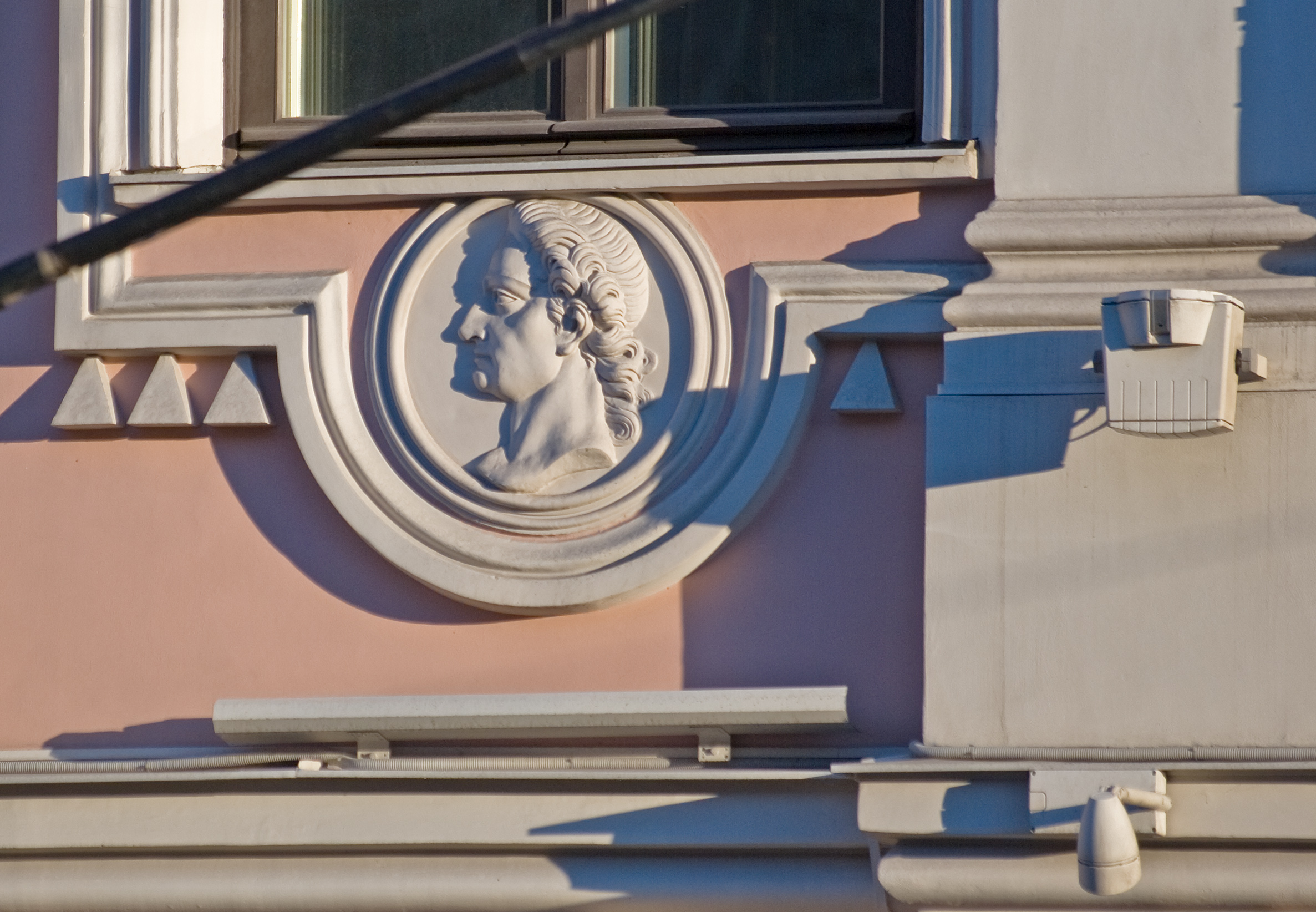
Who is this man? Stroganov or Rastrelli?

== Architecture ==
The main façade of the Stroganov palace faces Nevsky Prospect. Here, Rastrelli rejects the cour d'honneur in the French manner, like the one in the design of the Vorontsov Palace, built by Rastrelli in 1744–1750. Increasing plastic expression toward the center is a favorite method of the architect's for producing strong concentration in a building.

The facade carries an entrance arch supported by two Corinthian columns. The arch is crowned with a pediment bearing the Stroganov coat of arms. The spaces under the windows on the facade feature a man's profile. There are two practically anecdotal versions regarding this man's identity. According to one version, the man is the first owner of the palace, Baron Stroganov, whom Rastrelli wanted to surprise. However, many historians claim that the famous architect in fact left his own profile on the palace walls. According to this version, Rastrelli decided to do this as an unusual signature to commemorate his work.

== Gallery ==
- Beloselsky-Belozersky Palace was built in the 19th century at the opposite end of Nevsky Prospect as an architectural mirror of Stroganov Palace
Stroganov Palace

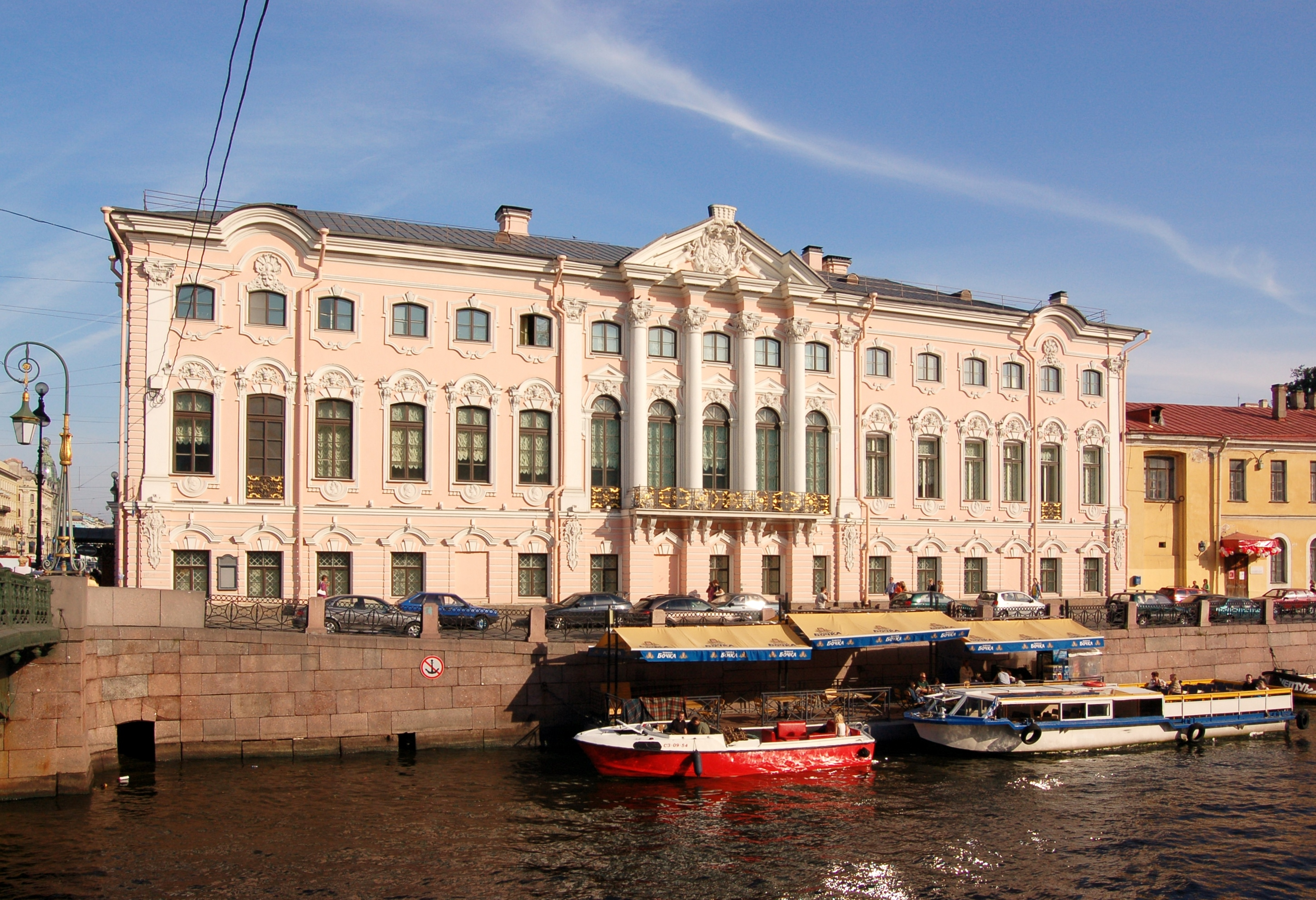
View of the palace from the Green Bridge

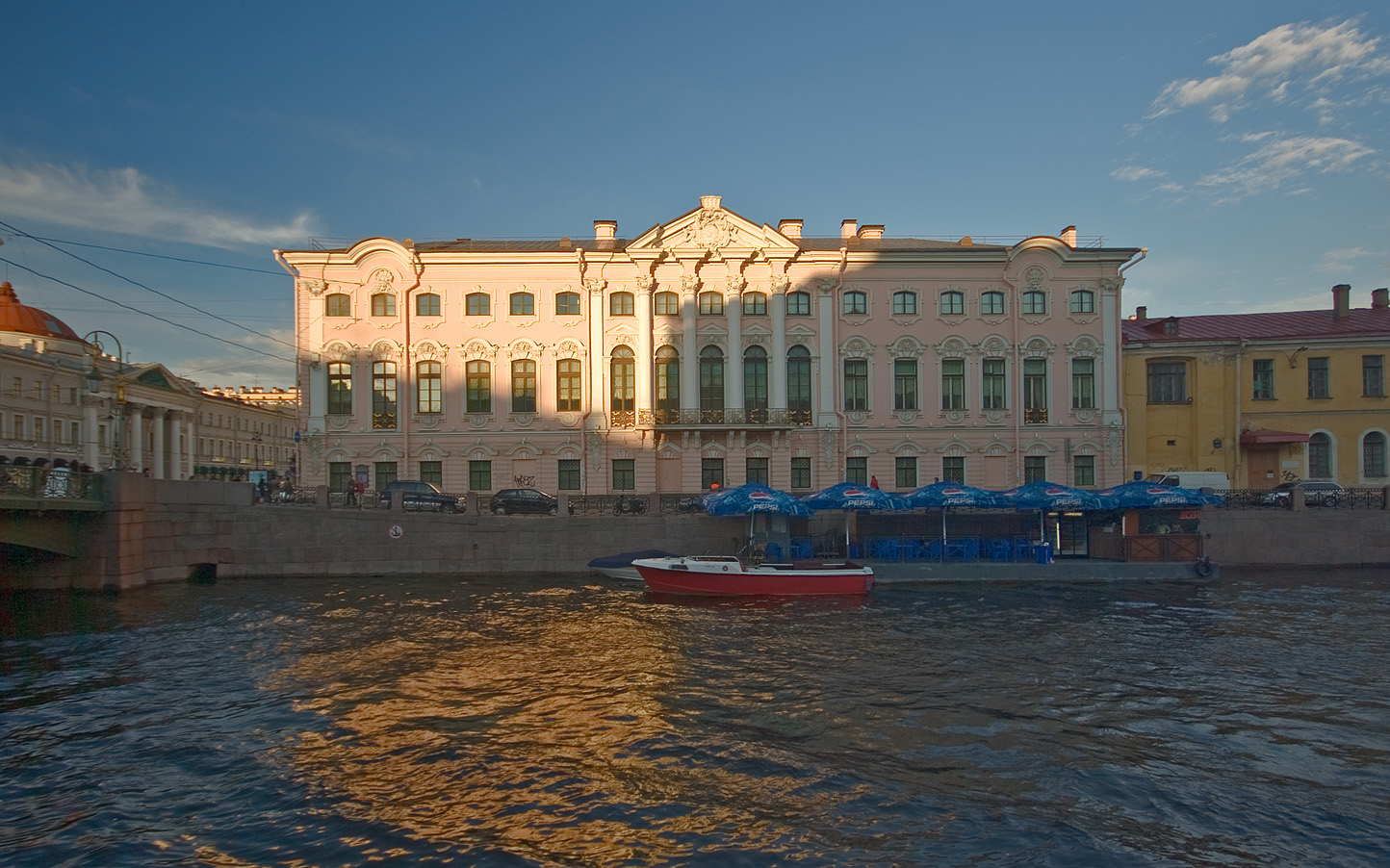
Moika River façade

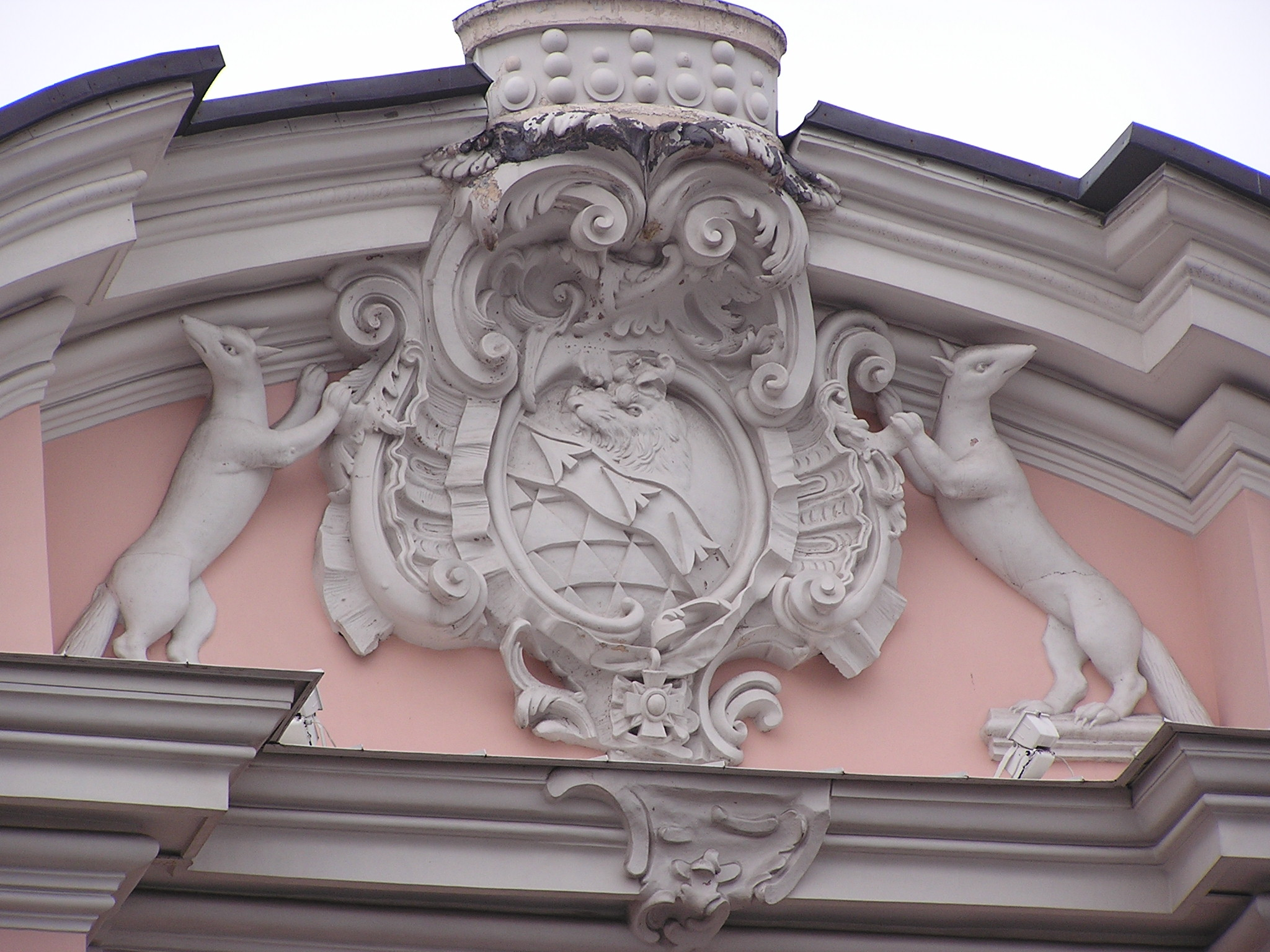
Stroganov coat of arms

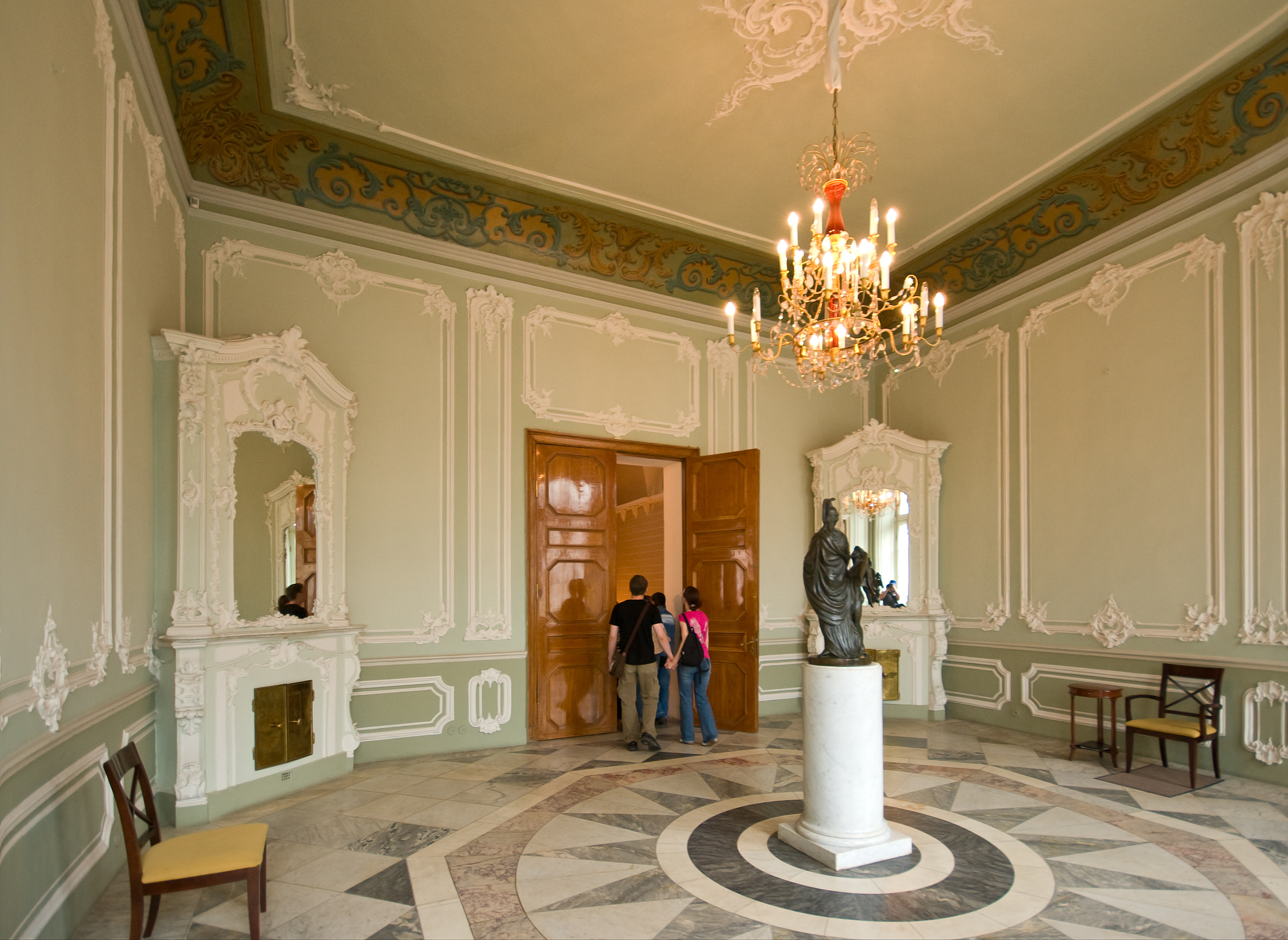
The so-called New Vestibule

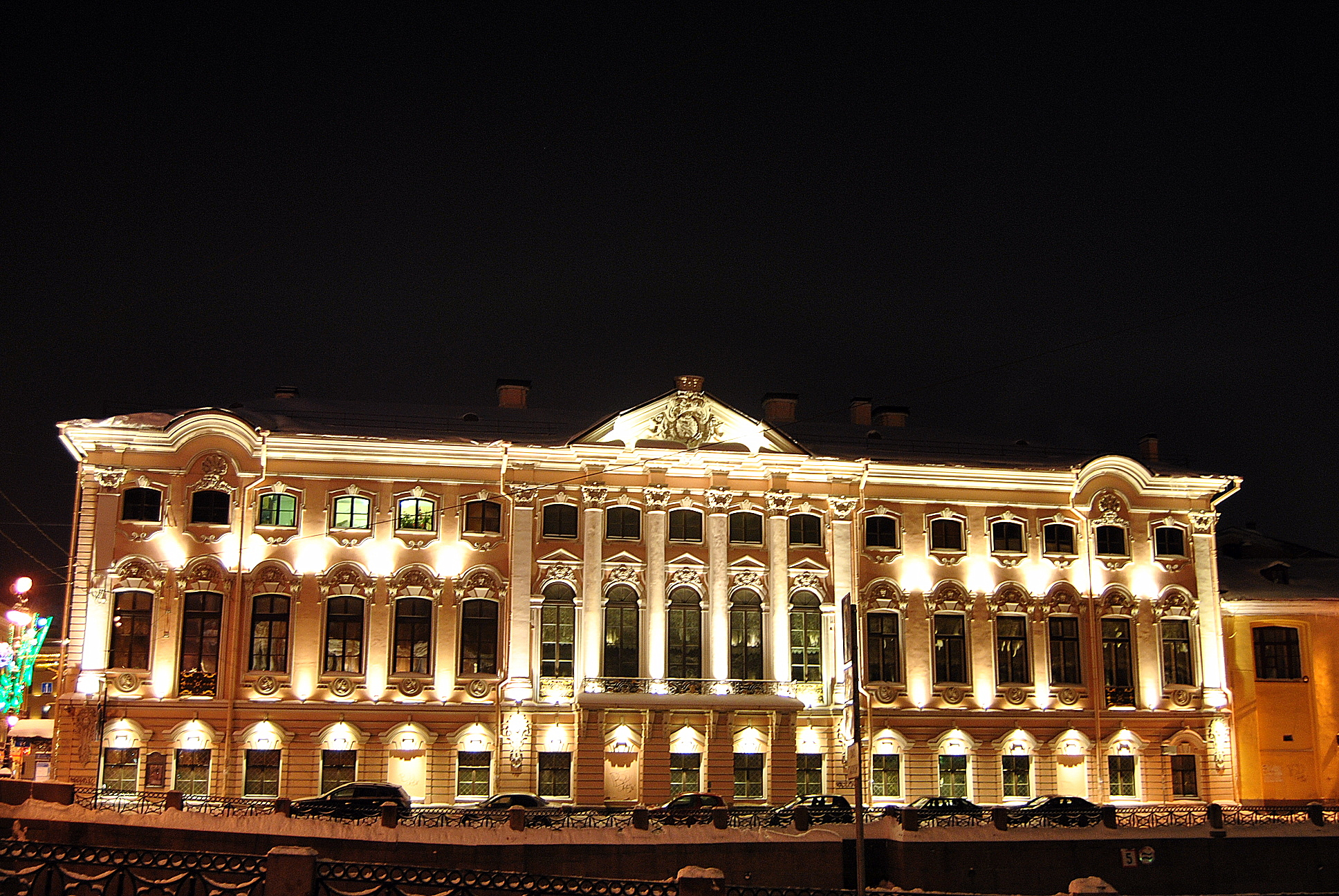
The palace by night
Some paintings that used to hang in the palace

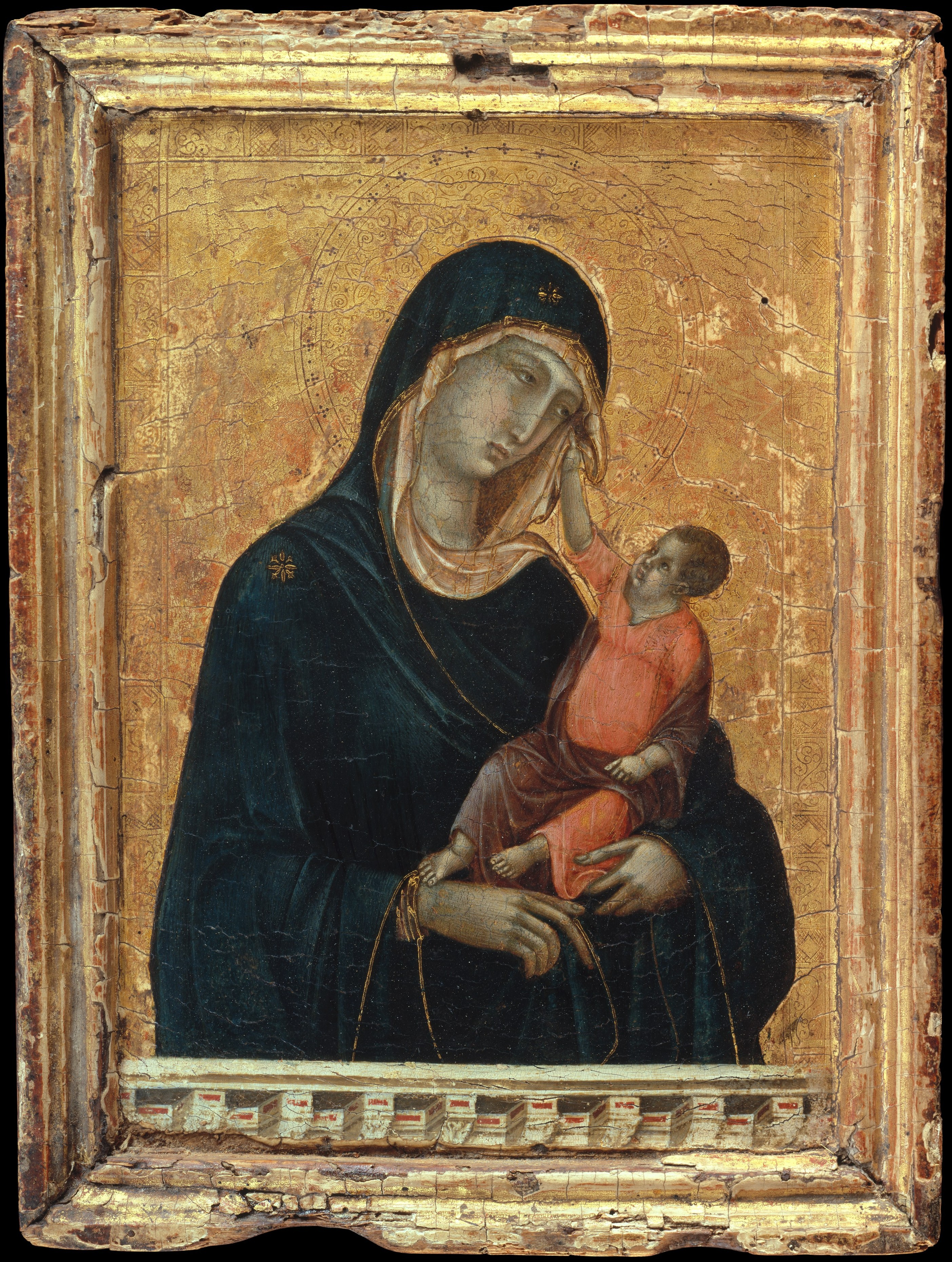
Stroganoff Madonna, by Duccio

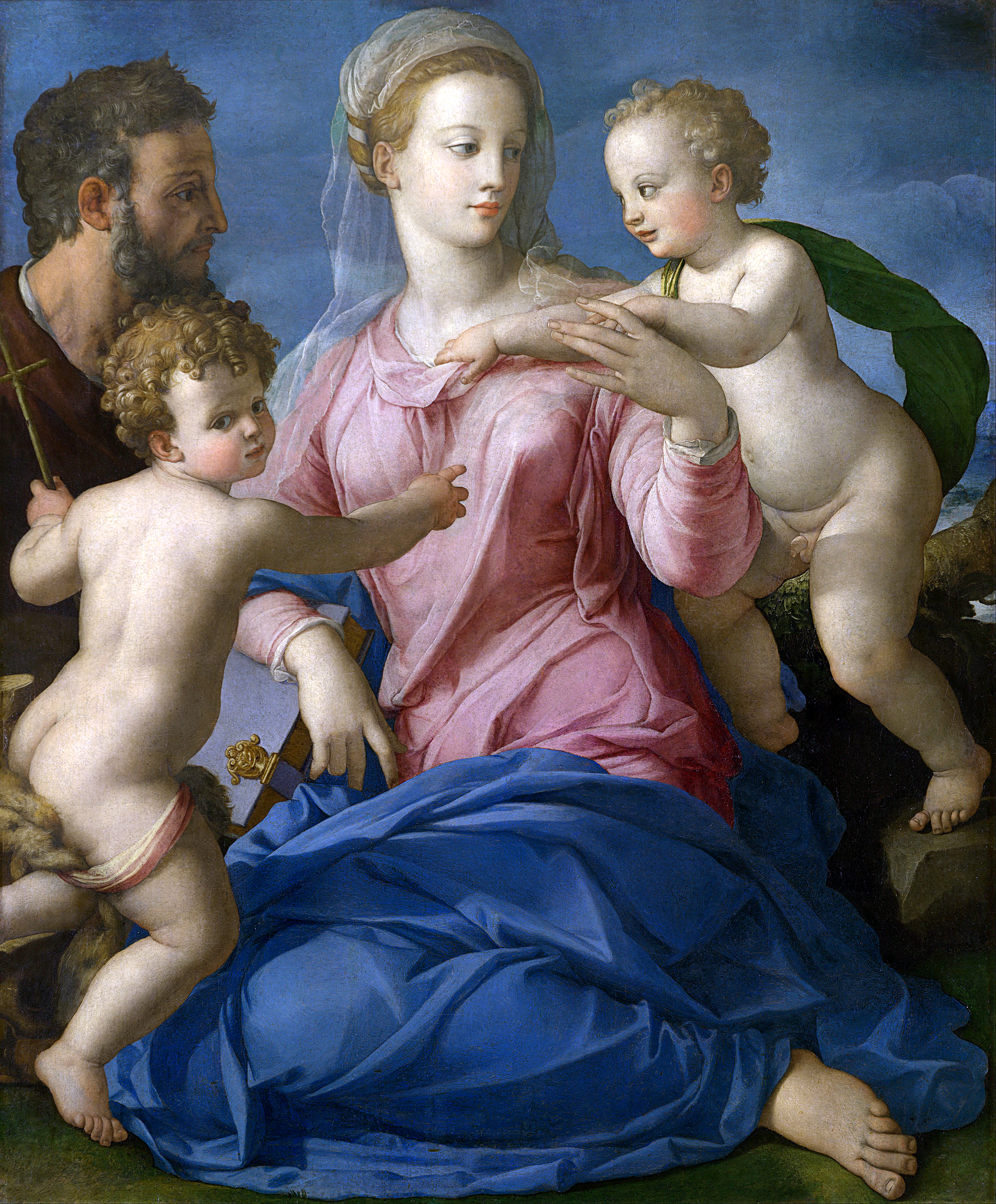
Madonna Stroganoff, by Bronzino

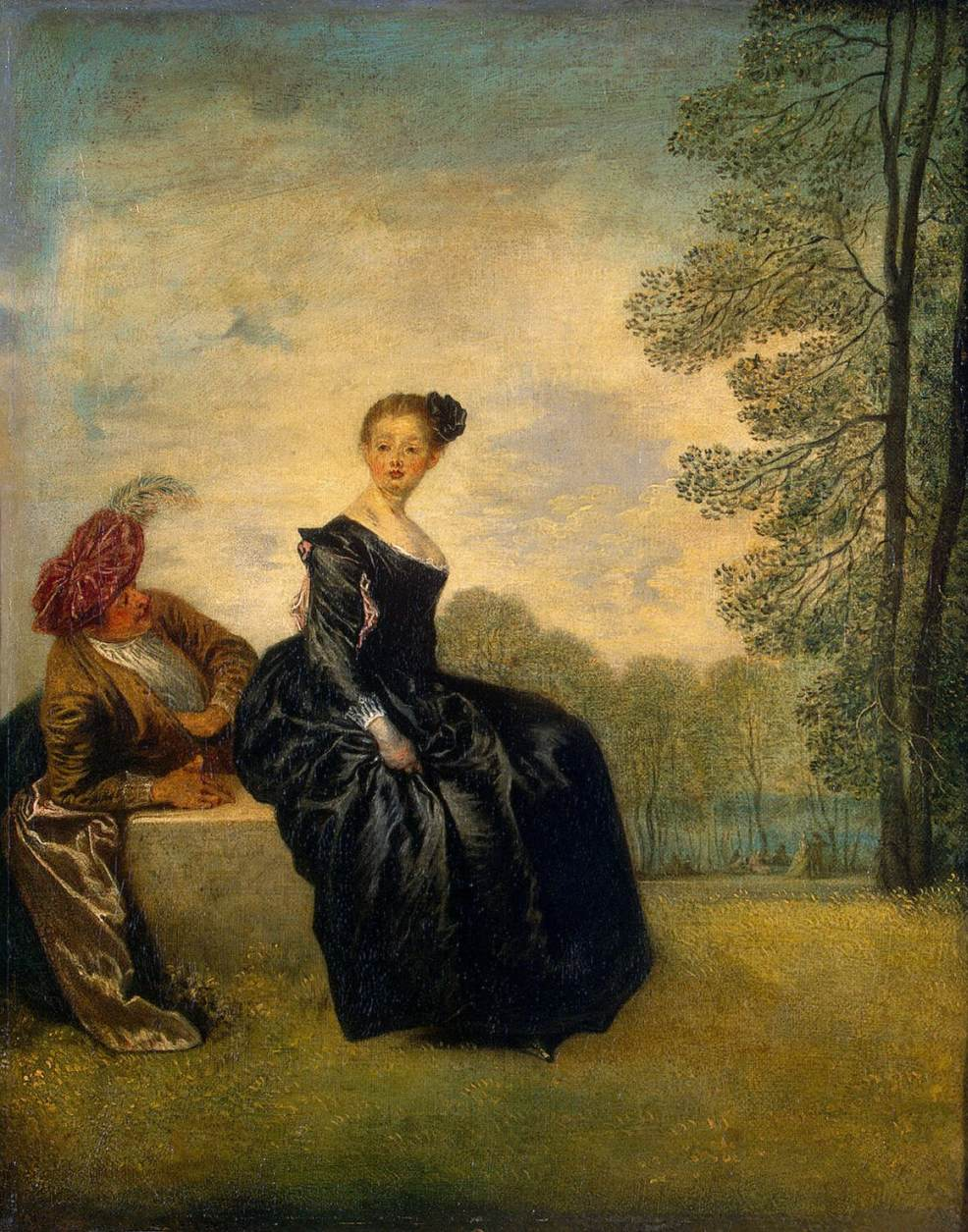
La Boudeuse, by Watteau

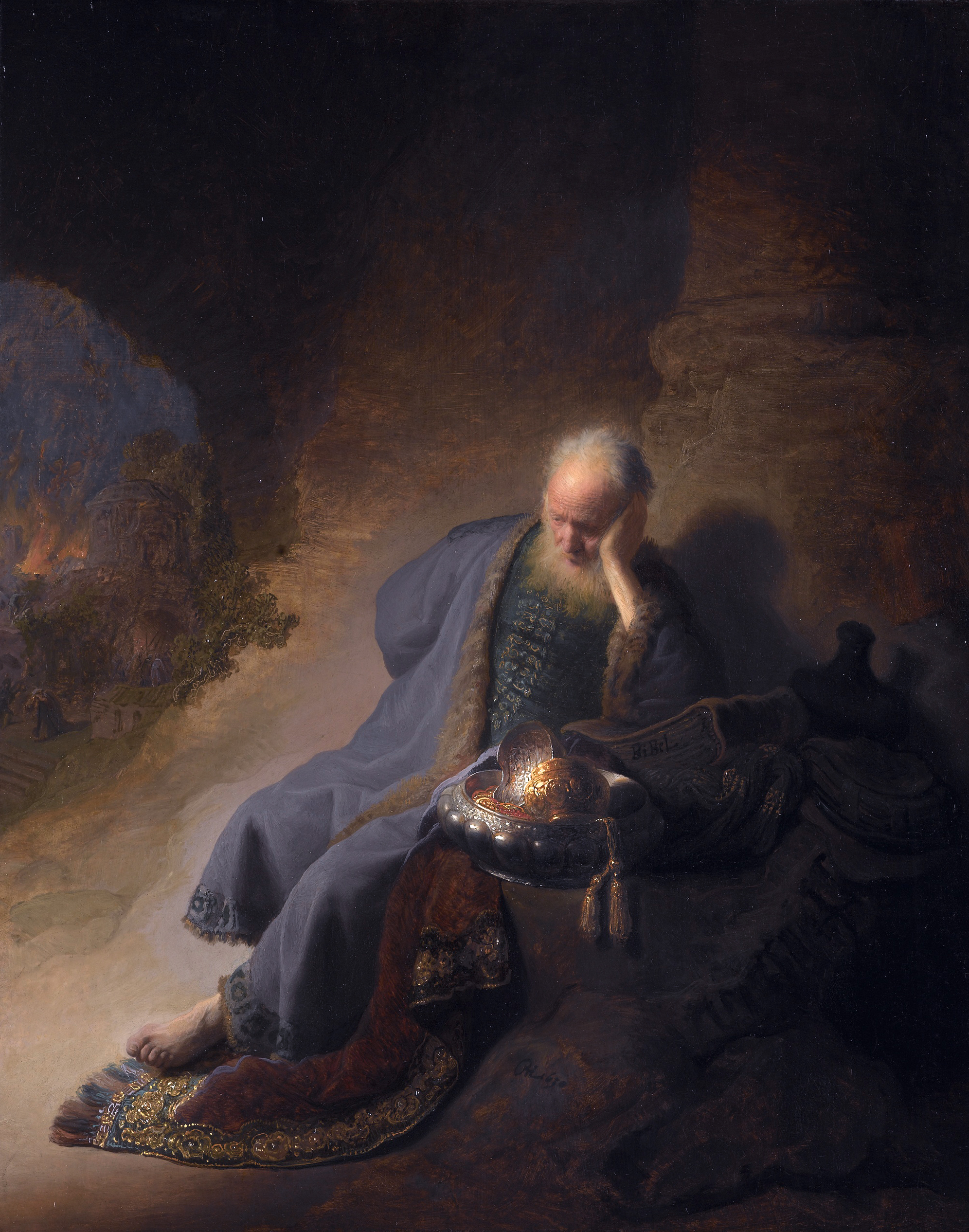
Jeremiah, by Rembrandt

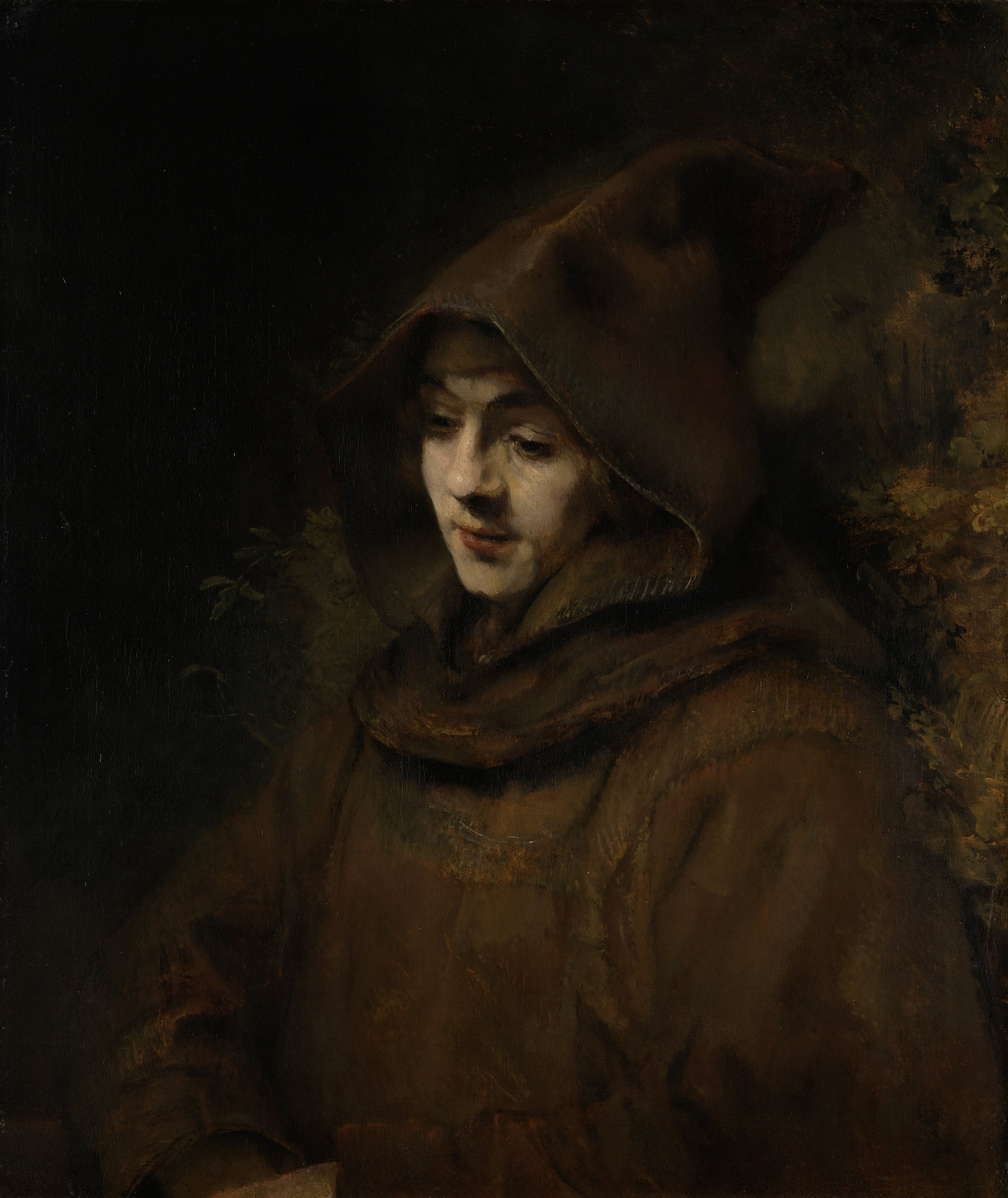
Titus in a Monk’s Habit, by Rembrandt

== See also ==
- List of Baroque residences
