= Mikhail Terebenyov =

Russian painter

- Михаил Теребенёв
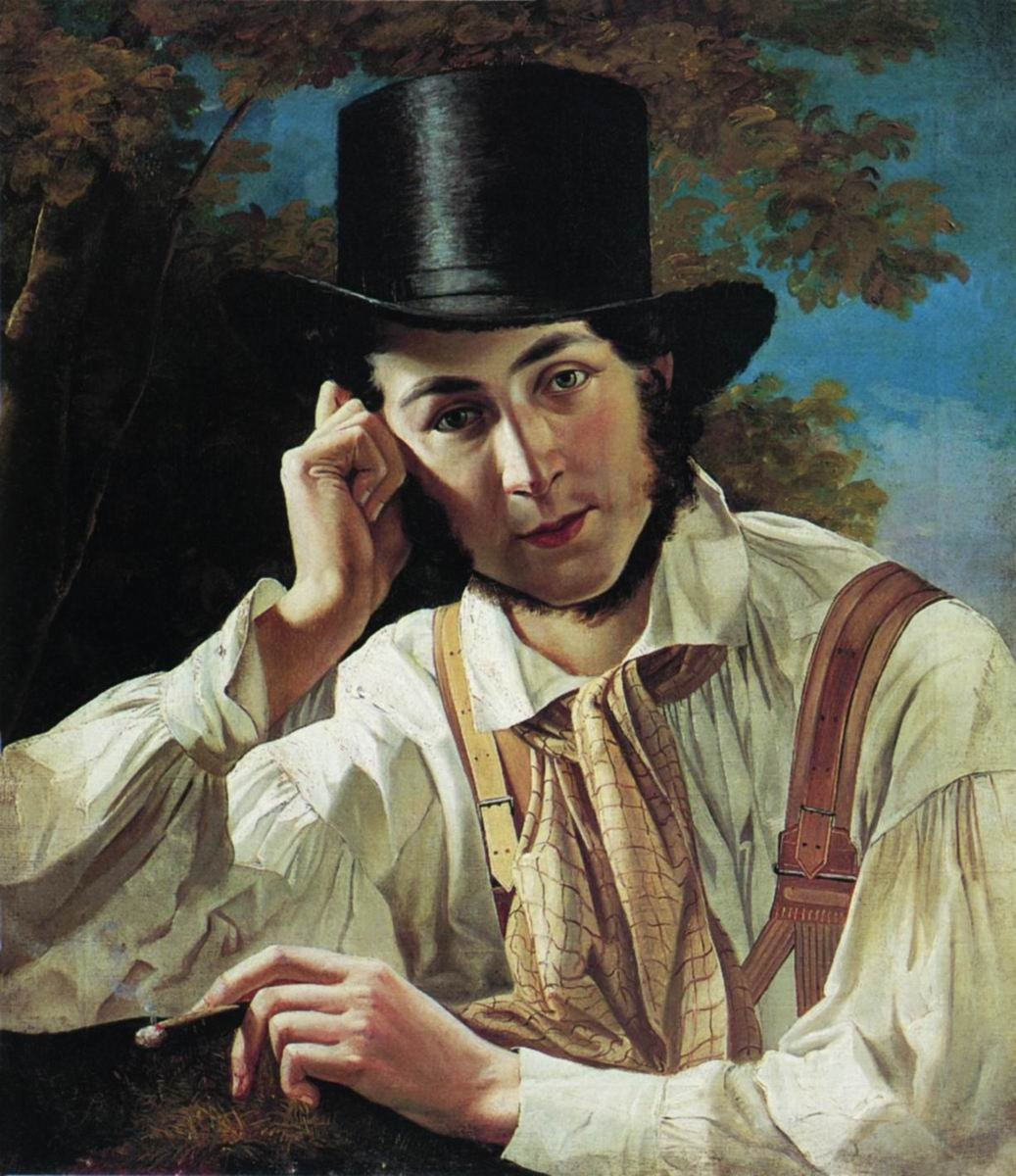
- Self-portrait
- Born: 6 September 1795; Saint Petersburg
- Died: 25 December 1864 (aged 69); Saint Persburg
- Education: Imperial Academy of Arts

Mikhail Ivanovich Terebenyov (Russian: Михаи́л Ива́нович Теребенёв; 6 September 1795 – 25 December 1864) was a Russian portrait painter, academician of the Imperial Academy of Arts.

== Biography ==
Mikhail Terebenyov was born in Saint Petersburg in 1795. His father Ivan Efimovich Terebenyov (1759–1799) was an artist who graduated from the Academy of Arts in 1779, his brother Ivan (1780–1815) was a sculptor, painter and graphic artist, another brother Vladimir (1808–1876) was an artist and lithographer.

In 1803, he entered the Imperial Academy of Arts.

The artist died in Saint Petersburg on December 25, 1864.

== Gallery ==
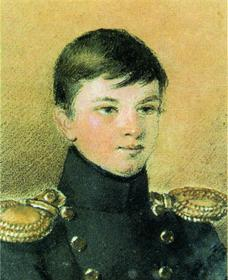
Portrait of the Decembrist D. I. Zavalishin

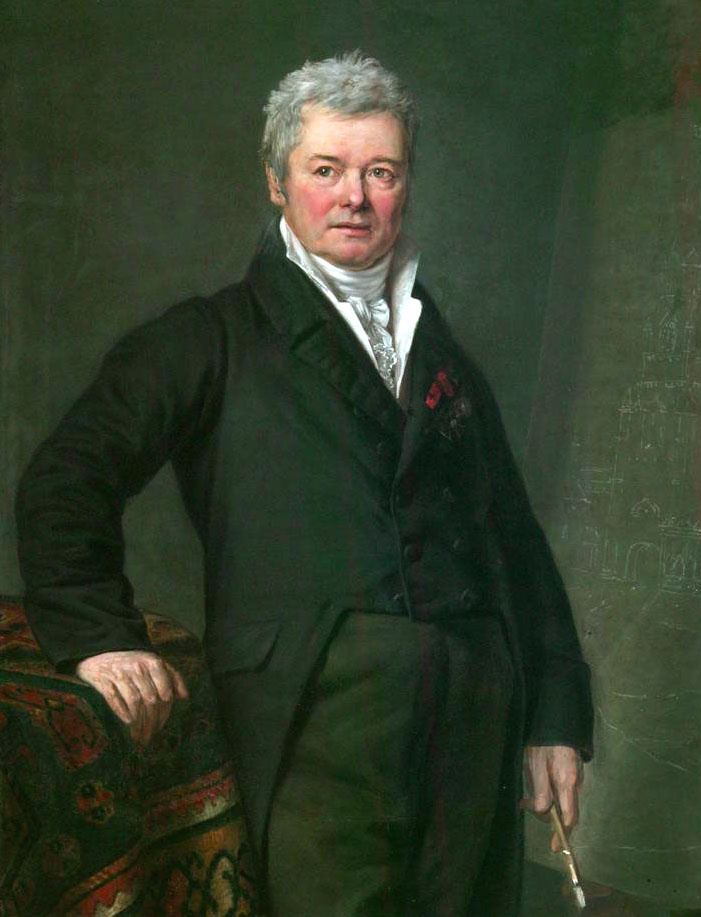
Portrait of Fyodor Alekseyev

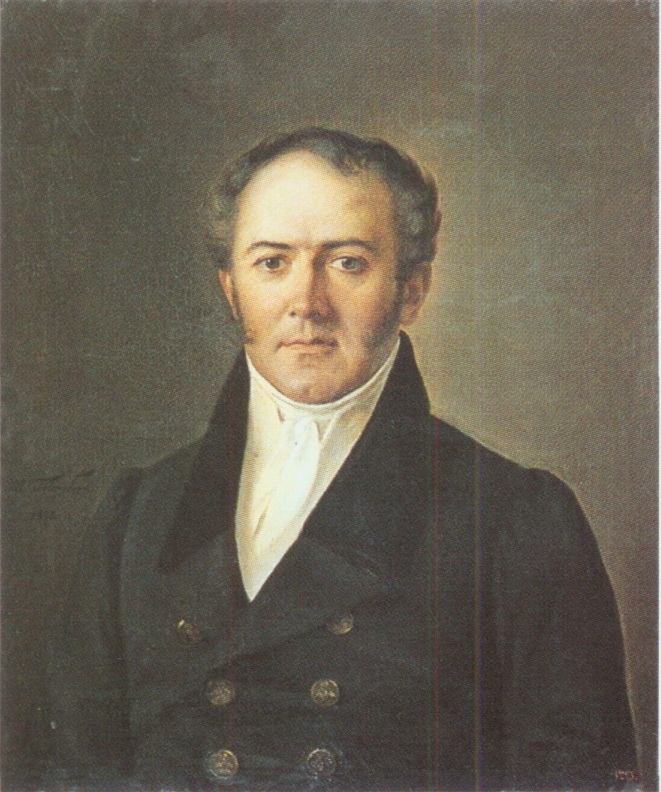
Portrait of Professor Iliya Buyalsky

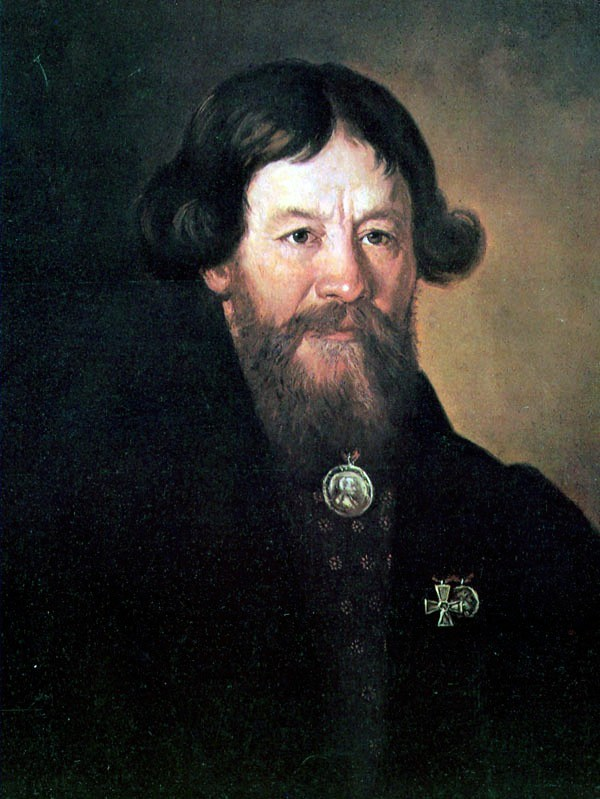
Portrait of partisan Egor Stulov
