= Garrison school =

Garrison schools (Russian: гарнизо́нные шко́лы) were military schools in 18th century Russia that provided the primary education for the children of military recruits.

== History ==
The institution of the Garrison schools were introduced by the ukase (decree) of Tsar Peter the Great in 1721 primarily for the children of military recruits in the course of Peter's reform of the Russian military. This so-called military revolution transformed the military from an archaic militia-like force to the regular army, which drew upon military recruits called, predominantly from enserfed peasantry, to serve for 25 years, which, given the expected life span of most Russian serfs at the time, essentially meant that they would serve for life.

The recruits and their children born after the recruitment were liberated from the serf status, and a network of Garrison schools was created for the children's education. The boys, starting from the age of 7, were taught literacy, elementary math, "artillery and military engineering", but also fine arts and several trade professions, such as shoe-making, sewing, and wood- and metal-working.

Initially, 49 schools were founded, each for 50 boys aged 7 to 15. Upon completion of elementary study course, the boys' education was specialized as follows: 10 boys studied artillery and fortification, 20 studied music (drums and singing), 10 studied trade professions and 10 studied clerical work and writing, scrivenery (Russian: письмоводство). Most school graduates entered the military service.

In 1798, the Garrison schools were renamed "Military institutions for the orphans" (Russian: военно-сиротские отделения) which in turn were transformed into Cantonist schools.

== See also ==
- Cantonist
