= Judaism and politics =

The relationship between Judaism and politics is a historically complex subject, and has evolved over time concurrently with both changes within Jewish society and religious practice, and changes in the general society of places where Jewish people live. In particular, Jewish political thought can be split into four major eras: Biblical (prior to Roman rule), Rabbinic (from roughly the 100 BCE to 600 CE), Medieval (from roughly 600 CE to 1800 CE), and Modern (18th century to the present day).

Several different political models are described across the canon of the Biblical era, usually composed of some combination of tribal federation, monarchy, a priestly theocracy, and rule by prophets. Political organization during the Rabbinic and Medieval eras generally involved semi-autonomous rule by Jewish councils and courts (with council membership often composed purely of rabbis) that would govern the community and act as representatives to secular authorities outside the Jewish community. Beginning in the 19th century, and coinciding with the expansion of the political rights accorded to individual Jews in European society, Jews would affiliate with and contribute theory to a wide range of political movements and philosophies.

== Biblical models ==
Stuart Cohen has pointed out that there are three separate power centers depicted in the Hebrew Bible: the priesthood, the royal throne, and the prophets.

One model of biblical politics is the model of the tribal federation, where power is shared among different tribes and institutions. Another is the model of limited constitutional monarchy.

The Hebrew Bible contains a complex chronicle of the Kings of Israel and Judah. Some passages of the Hebrew Bible contain intimate portrayals of the inner workings of the royal households of Saul, David, and Solomon; the accounts of subsequent monarchs are frequently more distanced and less detailed, and frequently begin with the judgement that the monarch "did evil in the sight of the Lord".

Daniel Elazar has argued that the concept of covenant is the fundamental concept in the biblical political tradition and in the later Jewish thought that emerges from the Bible.

Outside of the Hebrew Bible, the ancient Jewish scribe, sage, and allegorist Ben Sira stated "A work is praised for the skill of the artisan; so a people's leader is proved wise by his words. The loud of mouth are feared in their city, and the one who is reckless in speech is hated". This was followed by "A wise magistrate educates his people, and the rule of an intelligent person is well ordered. As the people's judge is, so are his officials; as the ruler of the city is, so are all its inhabitants. An undisciplined king ruins his people, but a city becomes fit to live in through the understanding of its rulers," implying the political leader's intelligence reflects the one of his people. This can be seen as an early example of Jewish political philosophy.

== Rabbinic period ==
=== The Sanhedrin ===
In Roman Judea, Jewish communities were governed by rabbinical courts known as Sanhedrin. Lesser Sanhedrins composed of 23 judges were appointed to each city, while a Great Sanhedrin with 71 judges was the highest authority, taking cases appealed from the lower courts. The Sanhedrin served as the leadership of the Jewish community under Roman rule, and served as emissaries to the imperial authorities in addition to overseeing religious practice and collecting taxes. The Sanhedrin was the highest Jewish governing body of the Second Temple period.

=== Talmudic sources on political philosophy ===
A statement by Judah bar Ilai in the Babylonian Talmud (Sanhedrin 20b) depicts monarchy as the ideal form of Jewish governance, following the Book of Deuteronomy statement that, "When you come into the land that the Lord your God is about to give you, and you take hold of it and dwell in it, and you say, 'Let me put a king over me like all the nations that are around me', you shall surely put over you a king whom the Lord your God chooses..." (Deut. 17:14–15). But the Talmud also brings a different interpretation of this verse from Eleazar ben Arach, who is quoted as explaining that, "This section was spoken only in anticipation of their future murmurings, as it is written, and you say, Let me put a king over me..." (Sanhedrin 20b). In many interpretations, Rabbi Nehorai does not think of appointing a king as a strict obligation, but as a concession to later "murmurings" from Israel.

In addition to imagining ideal forms of governance, the rabbis accept a principle to obey the government currently in power. The Talmud makes reference to the principle of dina de-malkhuta dina ("the law of the land is law"), a principle recognizing non-Jewish laws and non-Jewish legal jurisdiction as binding on Jewish citizens, provided that they are not contrary to any laws of Judaism.

== Medieval period ==
=== The Qahal ===
During the Middle Ages, some Ashkenazi Jewish communities were governed by qahal. The qahal had regulatory control over Jewish communities in a given region; they administered commerce, hygiene, sanitation, charity, Jewish education, kashrut, and relations between landlords and their tenants. It provided a number of community facilities, such as a rabbi, a ritual bath, and an interest-free loan facility for the Jewish community. The qahal even had sufficient authority that it could arrange for individuals to be expelled from synagogues, excommunicating them.

=== Medieval Jewish political philosophy ===
Some medieval political theorists such as Maimonides and Nissim of Gerona saw kingship as the ideal form of government. Maimonides' views the commandment in Deuteronomy to appoint a king as a clear positive ideal, following the Talmudic teaching that "three commandments were given to Israel when they entered the land: to appoint a king, as it says, 'You shall surely put over you a king'...". A large section of Maimonides' legal code, the Mishneh Torah, titled "The Laws of Kings and their Wars", deals with the ideal model of kingship, especially in the messianic era, and also concerning ruling over non-Jewish subjects through the Noachide laws. Other sections of Maimonides' Mishneh Torah (mostly also in the Book of Judges, where the laws of kingship are also found) is dedicated to the laws relating to legislators and judges.

Whereas Maimonides' idealized kingship, other medieval political theorists, such as Abravanel, saw kingship as misguided. Later on, other Jewish philosophers such as Baruch Spinoza would lay the groundwork for the Enlightenment, arguing for ideas such as the separation of church and state. Spinoza's writings caused him to be excommunicated from the Jewish community of Amsterdam, although his work and legacy has been largely rehabilitated, especially among secular Jews in the 20th and 21st centuries.

== Modern period ==
With Jewish emancipation, the institution of the qahal as an autonomous entity was officially abolished. Jews increasingly became participants in the wider political and social sphere of larger nations. As Jews became citizens of states with various political systems, and argued about whether to found their own state, Jewish ideas of the relationship between Judaism and politics developed in many different directions.

=== In Europe ===
In the nineteenth century and early twentieth century, when there was a large Jewish population in Europe, some Jews favored various forms of liberalism, and saw them as connected with Jewish principles. Some Jews allied themselves with a range of Jewish political movements. These included Socialist and Bundist movements favored by the Jewish left, Zionist movements, Jewish Autonomist movements, Territorialist movements, and Jewish Anarchism movements. Haredi Jews formed an organization known as World Agudath Israel which espoused Haredi Jewish political principles.

==== 21st century ====
In the 21st century, shifts are occurring. The Jewish community in Great Britain, one of the largest in the Jewish diaspora, is leaning conservative, as a poll published by the Jewish Chronicle in early 2015 shows. Of British Jews polled, 69% would vote for the Conservative Party, while 22% would vote for the Labour Party. This is in stark contrast to the rest of the voter population, which, according to a BBC poll, had Conservatives and Labour almost tied at about a third each. Jews have typically been a part of the British middle class, traditional home of the Conservative Party, although the number of Jews in working class communities of London is in decline. The main voting bloc of poorer Jews in Britain now, made up primarily of ultra-Orthodox, votes en masse for the Conservatives. Attitudes toward Israel influence the vote of three out of four of British Jews.

A shift toward conservatism has also been exhibited in France, where about half of the Jewish population is Sephardic. Jérôme Fourquet, director "Public opinion and corporate strategy" department at the polling organization IFOP, notes that there is a "pronounced preference" for right-wing politics among French Jews. During the 2007 election, Jews (Orthodox or not) represented the strongest pillar of support for Sarkozy after observant Catholics.

=== In the United States ===
==== 19th century ====
===== American Civil War =====
During the American Civil War, Jews were divided in their views of slavery and abolition. Prior to 1861, there were virtually no rabbinical sermons on slavery. The silence on this issue was probably a result of fear that the controversy would create conflict within the Jewish community. Some Jews owned slaves or traded them. Most southern Jews supported slavery, and few Northern Jews were abolitionists, seeking peace and remaining silent on the subject of slavery. America's largest Jewish community, New York's Jews, were "overwhelmingly pro-southern, pro-slavery, and anti-Lincoln in the early years of the war". However, eventually, they began to lean politically toward Abraham Lincoln's Republican party and emancipation.

Swedish born-rabbi Morris Jacob Raphall was one of the most vocal Jewish supporters of the institution of slavery. Mordecai Manuel Noah was against the expansion of slavery initially, but later became an opponent of emancipation. Isaac Mayer Wise followed a policy of silence on the issue when the war broke out. Wise was a supporter of the Democratic Party, pro-slavery at that time. Ernestine Rose was one Jewish opponent of slavery, as was Bernhard Felsenthal. Moses Mielziner opposed slavery on a Jewish religious argument, arguing that Mosaic law maintained a compassionate view toward the slave. Rabbi David Einhorn also invoked Jewish values against slavery. Rose and Einhorn were threatened with tar and feathering.

==== 20th and 21st centuries ====
While earlier Jewish immigrants tended to be politically conservative, the wave of Eastern European Jews starting in the early 1880s, were generally more liberal or left-wing, and became the political majority. For most of the 20th century since 1936, the vast majority of Jews in the United States have been aligned with the Democratic Party. Supporters of the Jewish left have argued that left-wing values vis-à-vis social justice can be traced to Jewish religious texts, including the Tanakh and later texts, which include a strong endorsement of hospitality to "the stranger" and the principle of redistribution of wealth – as well as a tradition of challenging authority, as exemplified by the biblical prophets.

American rabbinic leaders who have advanced a progressive political agenda grounded in Jewish principles have included:

- Arthur Waskow of the Jewish Renewal movement
- Michael Lerner of the Jewish Renewal movement, the founder of Tikkun magazine
- Jill Jacobs of Conservative Judaism
- David Saperstein of Reform Judaism

Other prominent Jews who have argued based on Jewish principles for a progressive political agenda have included:

- Ruth Messinger, former president and CEO of American Jewish World Service
- Stosh Cotler, CEO of Bend the Arc

Towards the end of the 20th century, and at the beginning of the 21st century, Republicans began a platform that sought to take the Jewish vote away from the Democrats. While a solid majority of American Jews continues to be aligned with the Democratic Party, many have argued that there is increased Jewish support for political conservatism.

Rabbinic leaders who have advanced a conservative political agenda grounded in Jewish principles have included:

- Seymour Siegel of Conservative Judaism
- David Dalin of Conservative Judaism

Other prominent Jews who have argued based on Jewish principles for a conservative political agenda have included:

- Daniel Lapin of Orthodox Judaism
- David Klinghoffer
- Dennis Prager
- Elliott Abrams
- David Mamet
- Ben Shapiro

===== Jewish political philosophy in North America =====
Significant Jewish political philosophers in North America have included:

- David Novak, a rabbi and philosopher at the University of Toronto, associated with the Union for Traditional Judaism
- Alan Mittleman, a rabbi and philosopher at the Jewish Theological Seminary of Conservative Judaism
- Daniel Elazar, a professor of political science at Bar-Ilan University and Temple University
- Michael Walzer, a political theorist at the Institute for Advanced Study in Princeton, New Jersey
- Michael Sandel, a political philosopher at Harvard University
- Robert Nozick, a late political philosopher at Harvard University
- Murray Rothbard, a late anarcho-capitalist philosopher and economist at the University of Nevada, Las Vegas
- Ronald Dworkin, a philosopher of law and political philosopher at New York University

=== In Israel ===
The development of a political system in Israel drew largely on European models of governance, rather than on models from the Jewish political tradition. Some political figures in Israel, however, have seen their principles as based in Judaism. This is especially pronounced in political parties that see themselves as religious parties, such as Shas, United Torah Judaism, and The Jewish Home.

Politics in Israel are dominated by Zionist parties. They traditionally fall into three camps, the first two being the largest: Labor Zionism, Revisionist Zionism and Religious Zionism. There are also several non-Zionist Orthodox religious parties, non-Zionist secular left-wing groups as well as non-Zionist and anti-Zionist Israeli Arab parties.

Recent interest in developing political theory grounded in Jewish sources has been spurred on by the activities of the neo-conservative Shalem Center.

=== In Australia ===
One example of a well-known Jew in Australian politics is Josh Frydenberg, a member of the centre-right, conservative Liberal Party, who (until 2022 served as Treasurer and was (before being unseated) the member of Kooyong, a wealthy Melbourne electorate.

Currently, there are four Jews in the Australian Parliament, all in the House of Representatives. These are Mark Dreyfus (the Labor member for Isaacs in Victoria since 2007), Mike Freelander (the Labor member for Macarthur in New South Wales since 2016), Julian Leeser (the Liberal member for Berowra in New South Wales since 2016) and Josh Burns (the Labor member for Macnamara in Victoria since 2019).

The four electorates with the highest Jewish populations are:

Electorate	City	State	Jewish population
Wentworth	Sydney	New South Wales	16.2%
Macnamara	Melbourne	Victoria	12.8%
Goldstein	Melbourne	Victoria	8.8%
Kingsford Smith	Sydney	New South Wales	6.0%

Many Australian Jews have been hostile to the progressive Australian Greens party due to its perceived support for the Boycott, Divestment and Sanctions (BDS) movement, a pro-Palestinian political movement opposed by both major parties (the Liberal Party and the Labor Party).

There are currently three Jews in state parliaments of Australia: one in New South Wales (Ron Hoenig, the Labor member for electoral district of Heffron since 2012) and two in Victoria (David Southwick, the Liberal member for Caulfield since 2010; and Paul Hamer, the Labor member for Box Hill since 2018).

== See also ==
- Jewish conservatism
- Conservatism in Israel
- Far-right politics in Israel
- Liberalism in Israel
- Socialism in Israel
- Tikkun olam
