= Chutzpah (disambiguation) =

Chutzpah is a Hebrew term for audacity or nerve.

Chutzpah may also refer to:

- ¡Chutzpah!, a 2009 album by The Wildhearts
- Chutzpah Collective, a leftist Jewish collective in Chicago
- Chutzpah Magazine, a defunct Chinese literary magazine
- Chutzpah (web series), a 2021 web series on SonlyLiv
- Chutzpah!, a 1991 book by Alan Dershowitz
- The Chutzpah or Lior Ben-David, an Israeli professional wrestler

== See also ==
- Beyond Chutzpah, a 2005 book by Norman Finkelstein
