= Jewish left =

Left-wing ideologies and movements among Jews

The Jewish left refers to Jewish individuals or organizations that identify with or support left-wing or social liberal causes, consciously as Jews. There is no singular organization or movement that constitutes the Jewish left.

Jews have been major forces in the history of the labor movement, the settlement house movement, the women's rights movement, anti-racist and anti-colonialist work, and anti-fascist and anti-capitalist organizations of many forms in Europe, Canada, the United States, Australia, Mexico, Brazil, Argentina, the Ottoman Empire, Algeria, Iraq, Ethiopia, South Africa, Palestine, and the State of Israel.

Jews have a history of involvement in anarchism, socialism, Marxism, and Western liberalism. The expression "on the left" encompasses a range of political positions. Many individuals associated with left-wing politics have been Jews born into Jewish families, with varying degrees of connection to Jewish communities, cultures, traditions, or religious practices.

== History ==
Jewish leftist thought has roots in the Haskalah, led by thinkers such as Moses Mendelssohn, as well as in the support of European Jews, including Ludwig Börne, for republican ideals following the French Revolution and the Napoleonic Wars. In the eighteenth and nineteenth centuries, the movement for Jewish emancipation spread across Europe and was closely associated with the emergence of political liberalism, which emphasized Enlightenment principles of rights and equality before the law. At the time, liberals were considered part of the political left, and emancipated Jews, as they became more integrated into the political culture of their respective nations, were often associated with liberal political parties. Many Jews supported the American Revolution, the French Revolution, and the Revolutions of 1848. In England, Jews tended to support the Liberal Party, which had led the parliamentary struggle for Jewish emancipation, a political dynamic described by some scholars as "the liberal Jewish compromise".

=== The emergence of a Jewish working class ===
During the late 19th century, industrialisation led to the emergence of a Jewish working class in the cities of Eastern and Central Europe, followed by the development of a Jewish labor movement. The Jewish Labour Bund was established in Lithuania, Poland, and Russia in 1897, and various Jewish socialist organizations formed across the Russian Empire's Pale of Settlement. Additionally, individuals of Jewish origin participated in anarchist, socialist, social democratic, and communist movements, though not all explicitly identified as Jewish.

As Zionism developed as a political movement, Labor Zionist parties, such as Ber Borochov's Poale Zion, emerged. Other left-wing Jewish nationalist movements included territorialism, which sought a homeland for the Jewish people but not necessarily in Palestine; Jewish autonomism, which advocated for non-territorial national rights for Jews within multinational empires; and folkism, promoted by Simon Dubnow, which emphasized the cultural identity of Yiddish-speaking Jews.

As Eastern European Jews migrated West from the 1880s onward, these ideological movements took root in growing Jewish communities, including the East End of London, Paris’s Pletzl, New York City's Lower East Side, and Buenos Aires. London had an active Jewish anarchist movement, in which the non-Jewish German writer Rudolf Rocker was a central figure. In the United States, a significant Jewish socialist movement developed, exemplified by the Yiddish-language daily The Forward and trade unions such as the International Ladies' Garment Workers' Union and the Amalgamated Clothing Workers of America. Notable figures in these circles included Rose Schneiderman, Abraham Cahan, Morris Winchevsky, and David Dubinsky.

In the late 19th and early 20th centuries, Jews played a significant role in the social democratic parties of Germany, Russia, Austria-Hungary, and Poland. Historian Enzo Traverso has used the term "Judeo-Marxism" to describe the distinct contributions of Jewish socialists to Marxist thought. These ranged from cosmopolitan perspectives opposing nationalism, as seen in the views of Rosa Luxemburg and, to a lesser extent, Leon Trotsky, to positions more accommodating of cultural nationalism, as represented by the Austromarxists and Vladimir Medem.

While the majority of Jewish American socialists have been Ashkenazi Jews, a minority have been Sephardic Jews. Sephardic socialists were active in Jewish socialist politics in Chicago and New York City. In Chicago beginning in 1917, Sephardic Jews joined the Chicago Socialist Party's Spanish Section alongside Mexican Catholics and other Spanish speakers. The Spanish Section was founded by the Salonican-born Jewish socialist Raphael Hasson, who also helped found the Greek Federation of the Communist Party of America. In New York City, Salonican Jews published socialist publications including La Vara and La Bos del Pueblo (The Voice of the People). In New York City, there was a Sephardic Branch of the Workers' (Communist) Party. After moving to New York City, Raphael Hasson attempted unsuccessfully to found a Ladino-speaking section of the Workmen's Circle. In Harlem in the 1920s, Sephardic and Puerto Rican socialists in the garment industry collaborated to form the Sephardic Branch of the Workers' Party, known as the Spanish Branch. According to Devin E. Naar, a professor of Sephardic studies at the University of Washington, there was a time period during World War I when Sephardi socialists attempted to form a relationship with Yiddish-speaking socialists, but the relationship was temporary and that primarily Ashkenazi socialist spaces were not inclusive of Sephardic Jews.

=== In Soviets and against fascism ===
As with the American Revolution of 1776, the French Revolution of 1789, and the German Revolution of 1848, many Jews worldwide welcomed the Russian Revolution, viewing the collapse of a regime associated with antisemitic pogroms as a positive development. Many believed that the new Soviet order would improve conditions for Jews in the region. Many Jews became involved in communist parties, constituting large proportions of their membership in many countries, including Great Britain and the United States. Some communist parties had dedicated Jewish sections, such as the Yevsektsiya in the Soviet Union. The Soviet government implemented policies toward Jews and Jewish culture that fluctuated over time, at times promoting Jewish cultural development—such as supporting Yiddish-language scholarship and establishing the Jewish Autonomous Oblast—while also engaging in antisemitic purges, including the crackdown following the Doctors' Plot.

With the rise of fascism in parts of Europe during the 1920s and 1930s, many Jews became active in left-wing movements, particularly communist parties, which were at the forefront of antifascist efforts. Jewish volunteers participated in the International Brigades during the Spanish Civil War, including the American XV International Brigade and the Polish-Jewish Palafox Battalion. In Britain, Jews and leftist activists fought Oswald Mosley's British Union of Fascists, including at the Battle of Cable Street in 1936. The Jewish Anti-Fascist Committee in the Soviet Union also played a role in mobilizing opposition to fascism.

During World War II, Jewish leftist groups were actively involved in resistance to Nazism. Bundists and Labor Zionists played key roles in the Jewish Combat Organization and the Warsaw Ghetto Uprising.

=== Radical Jews in Central and Western Europe ===
Alongside movements rooted in the Jewish working class, relatively assimilated middle-class Jews in Central and Western Europe explored radicalism within Jewish tradition. Martin Buber incorporated Hasidic Jewish thought into his anarchist philosophy, while Gershom Scholem combined anarchism with his scholarship on Kabbalah. Walter Benjamin was influenced by both Marxism and Jewish messianism, and Gustav Landauer, a religious Jew, identified as a libertarian communist. Jacob Israël de Haan merged socialism with Haredi Judaism, while Bernard Lazare, a left-libertarian, initially embraced Zionism in 1897 but later criticized its supposedly bourgeois character in a letter to Theodor Herzl and the Zionist Action Committee writing "You are bourgeois in thoughts, bourgeois in your feelings, bourgeois in your ideas, bourgeois in your conception of society." In the Weimar Republic, Walther Rathenau was a prominent figure in the Jewish left.

==== In Britain ====
British Jews have played a significant role in left-wing politics in the United Kingdom, particularly within the Labour Party. As the Liberal Party declined in the early 20th century, the Labour Party emerged as the main party of the left. Jewish individuals were active in Labour, including Leonard Woolf and Hugh Franklin. Many Jewish MPs, such as Barnett Janner, Sir Percy Harris, and Harry Nathan, transitioned from the Liberal Party to Labour. Academics and intellectuals such as Harold Laski, Nicholas Kaldor, Victor Gollancz, and Karl Mannheim contributed to the ideological foundations of British socialism. Notable early Labour politicians included Lewis Silkin, a minister in Clement Attlee’s government, Sydney Silverman, who played a key role in the abolition of capital punishment in Britain, and Manny Shinwell, a leader of the Red Clydeside movement and later Secretary of State for War.

=== Sephardi socialists in the Ottoman Empire ===
Sephardi socialists in Thessaloniki (Salonica), most notably Avraam Benaroya, were active in the primarily Sephardi Socialist Workers' Federation and founded Ladino-language socialist publications such as La Epoca.

=== Labor Zionism and the Israeli left ===
In the twentieth century, particularly after the Second Aliyah, Labor Zionism became a significant force in the yishuv settlement of Palestine. It was first developed in Russia by the Marxist Ber Borochov and the non-Marxists Nachman Syrkin and A. D. Gordon. Organizations such as Poale Zion, the Histadrut labour union, and the Mapai party played a central role in the establishment of the State of Israel, with Labor Zionist politicians including David Ben-Gurion and Golda Meir among its founders. The kibbutz movement also emerged as a model of collective Jewish settlement based on Labor Zionist principles.

Labour Zionism flourished among Yiddish-speaking migrants in South America. Broit un ehre was a Yiddish-language Labour Zionist biweekly newspaper published in Argentina from 1909 to 1910. It was launched towards the end of 1909.

During the 1940s, many leftists supported the idea of a binational state in Palestine rather than an exclusively Jewish state, a position advocated by figures including Hannah Arendt and Martin Buber. Since the State of Israel's founding in 1948, the country has had an active political left, including both Zionist parties (including The Democrats and its predecessors) and anti-Zionist movements (such as the Palestine Communist Party and Maki). The Israeli Labor Party held power in the State of Israel for significant periods between 1948 and 2009.

Modern Labor Zionist organizations—Habonim Dror, Histadrut, Na'amat, Hashomer Hatzair, the Kibbutz movement, and Givat Haviva—are represented in the World Zionist Organization and stem from the interwar split between Poale Zion Right (which became Avoda/Labor) and Poale Zion Left (which produced Hashomer Hatzair, Mapam, and later Meretz); internationally they coalesce roughly into the World Labour Zionist Movement (formed by Avoda, Habonim Dror, Histadrut, and Na'amat) and the World Union of Meretz (comprising Meretz, Hashomer Hatzair, Kibbutz Artzi, and Givat Haviva).

=== Postwar era ===
As the Jewish working class declined after World War II, its associated institutions and political movements also diminished. In the United Kingdom, the English branch of The Workers Circle ceased operations in the 1950s, and Jewish trade unionism in the United States lost its influence around the same time. However, some remnants of Jewish working-class organizations continue to exist, including the Jewish Labor Committee, The Forward, and The Workers Circle in the United States, the International Jewish Labor Bund in Australia, and the United Jewish People's Order in Canada.

Starting in the 1960s, there was a renewed interest among Western Jews in Jewish working-class culture and radical traditions. This period saw the emergence of new Jewish organizations focused on Yiddish culture, Jewish spirituality, and social justice. In the United States, New Jewish Agenda operated from 1980 to 1992 as a national, multi-issue progressive membership organization advocating for a "Jewish voice on the Left and a Left voice in the Jewish Community". The Chutzpah Collective was a left-wing Jewish collective active in Chicago during the 1970s. The collective published the newspaper Chutzpah. In 1990, Jews for Racial and Economic Justice was founded in New York City to promote economic and social equity. In 1999, leftists in Los Angeles split from the American Jewish Congress to establish the Progressive Jewish Alliance.

==== United States ====
The majority of Jewish voters in the United States have backed the Democratic Party's presidential candidate in every election since 1924, with the exception of 1980.

==== United Kingdom ====
In Britain, organizations such as the Jewish Socialists' Group continued the pre-war tradition of Yiddish radicalism, while more recent groups like Jewdas have adopted a more eclectic and radical approach to Jewish identity and activism.

Following the World War II, the Labour Party formed a government, and several newly elected Jewish MPs were associated with the socialist left, influenced by events such as the Battle of Cable Street. These included Herschel Austin, Maurice Edelman, and Ian Mikardo, as well as Phil Piratin, one of the four Communist Party MPs in British history. Jewish MPs elected in the 1940s and 1950s who later held ministerial positions in Harold Wilson’s governments of the 1960s and 1970s included The Lord Barnett, Edmund Dell, John Diamond, Reg Freeson, The Baroness Gaitskell, Myer Galpern, Gerald Kaufman, The Lord Lever of Manchester, Paul Rose, The Lord Segal, The Baroness Serota, The Lord Sheldon, John and Samuel Silkin, Barnett Stross, and David Weitzman. Another Jewish Labour politician of this era, Leo Abse, played a notable role in the decriminalization of homosexuality and liberalisation to divorce laws. Robert Maxwell, a Labour MP in the 1964–66 Wilson government, eventually became a leading newspaper publisher when his holding company purchased Mirror Group Newspapers in 1984.

In the 1970s and 1980s, the Labour Party experienced internal divisions, including conflicts over the Militant tendency, a Trotskyist group led by Ted Grant, and the split that led to the formation of the Social Democratic Party (SDP). The SDP formed an Alliance with the Liberal Party (who had two Jewish MPs, The Lord Carlile of Berriew and Clement Freud) and later to unite as the Liberal Democrats. Some Jewish Labour MPs, such as Neville Sandelson and Robert Skidelsky, joined the SDP, while others, including Harry Cohen, Alf Dubs, Millie Miller, Eric Moonman, and David Winnick, remained in Labour.

During the late 1980s and 1990s, with the shift away from the socialist left of the party, and during Tony Blair's leadership of the Labour Party, notable senior Jewish politicians included Peter Mandelson, one of the architects of "New Labour", Peter Goldsmith, Baron Goldsmith, The Lord Beecham, and The Lord Gould of Brookwood. Mandelson, party fund-raiser The Lord Levy and Jack Straw (who is of partial Jewish ancestry), were accused by Tam Dalyell, MP, of being a "cabal of Jewish advisers" around Blair. Several of Blair's Ministers and Labour backbenchers were Jewish or partially Jewish, including Barbara Roche, Dame Margaret Hodge, Fabian Hamilton, Louise Ellman, The Baroness King of Bow, and Gillian Merron. Labour donors during the 1990s and 2000s who were Jewish included David Abrahams, The Lord Bernstein of Craigweil, Richard Caring, Sir Trevor Chinn, Sir David Garrard, The Lord Gavron, Sir Emmanuel Kaye, Andrew Rosenfeld, The Lord Sainsbury of Turville, and Barry Townsley. Several of these were caught up in the Cash for Honours scandal.

==== Belgium ====
In Belgium, the Union des progressistes juifs de Belgique traces its origins to the Jewish communist and Bundist Solidarité movement of the Belgian Resistance and has supported causes such as the Israeli refuseniks and the rights of undocumented immigrants in Belgium.

==== South Africa ====
South Africa's Jewish left was actively involved in left-wing causes, including the anti-apartheid movement. Several Jewish individuals were among the defendants in the Rivonia Trial, including Joe Slovo, Denis Goldberg, Lionel Bernstein, Bob Hepple, Arthur Goldreich, Harold Wolpe, and James Kantor. Helen Suzman was a Jewish member of the South African Parliament from 1953 to 1989, representing various liberal parties.

==== Australia ====
The Australian Jewish Democratic Society, a secular organisation, was formed in Melbourne, Australia, in 1984 to promote free discussion and action on Jewish and general social and political issues. It grew out of a profound concern at the continuing Arab–Israeli conflict, though some of its members had been active on the left since at least the 1930s in Europe. Others had been born in Israel or Australia, or spent considerable time in Israel. Others came out of the anti-Vietnam war and peace movements. Some key members had strong links to the Israeli peace movement, the Jewish left, Labor Zionism, or other Jewish religious and cultural traditions. More recently, members with strong environmental concerns have become active.

==== Israel ====
In Israel’s Knesset, left-wing political parties and blocs have participated in elections with varying degrees of success. Over time, these parties have undergone changes, with some merging, others dissolving, and new parties emerging.

Israeli social liberal, Labor Zionist, and left-wing parties have included:

- Hadash (1977–present)
- Mapam (1948–1997)
- Meretz (1992–2024)
- Israeli Labor Party (1968–2024)
- Meimad (founded 1988)
- Progressive List for Peace (1984–1990s)
- Ratz (1973–1997)
- Left Camp of Israel (1970s–1980s)
- Meri (1960s–1970s)
- Maki (1965–present)

Notable figures associated with these parties have included Amir Peretz, Meir Vilner, Shulamit Aloni, Uri Avnery, Yossi Beilin, Ran Cohen, Matti Peled, Amnon Rubinstein, Dov Khenin and Yossi Sarid.

=== 21st century ===
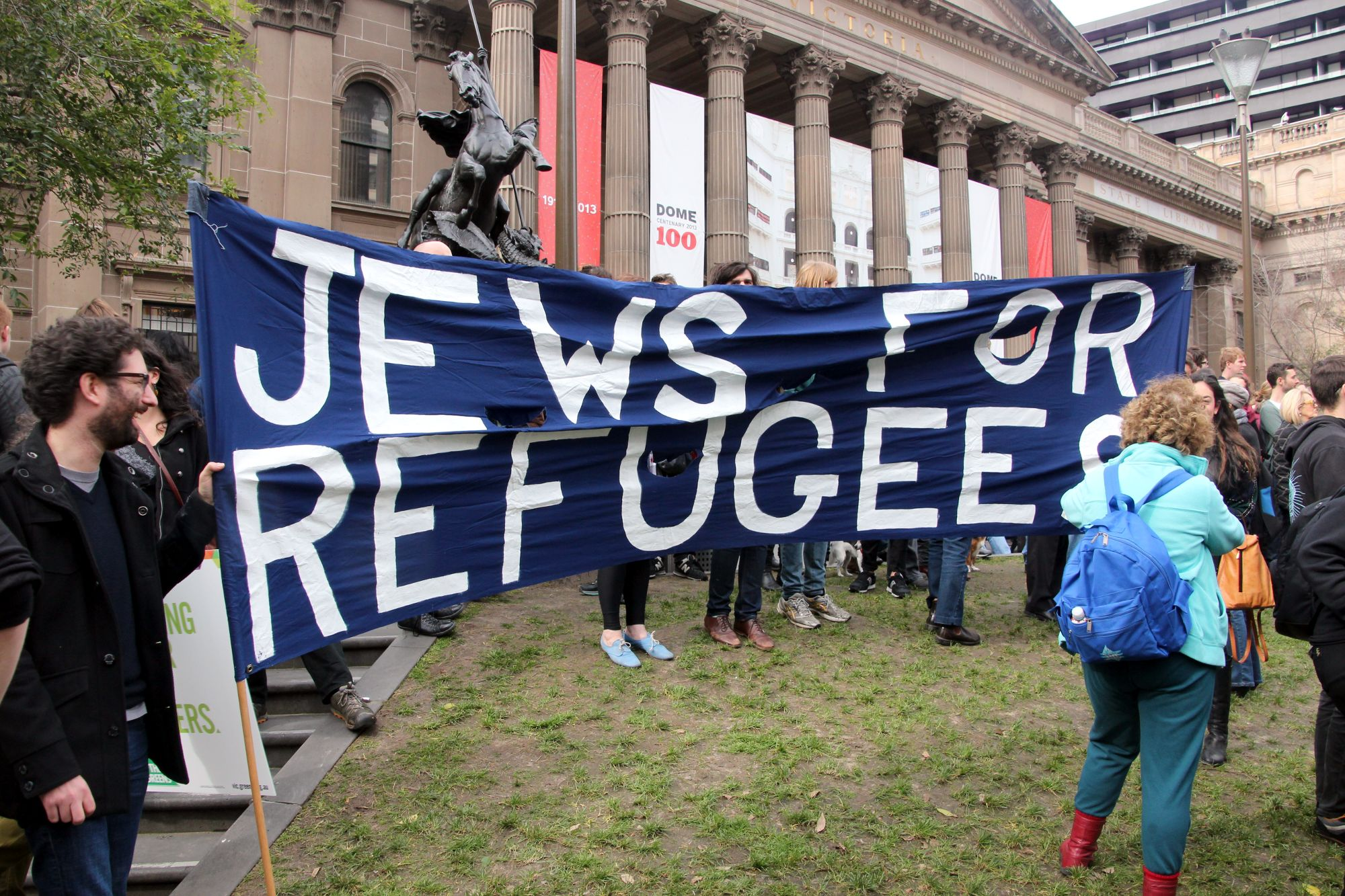
Melbourne Jews protest Australia's policy on refugees in July 2013.

During the first decade of the 2000s, the Israeli–Palestinian conflict became an increasing factor in shaping the Jewish left. A new wave of grassroots leftist Jewish organizations emerged in support of Palestinian causes. Groups such as Jewish Voice for Peace in the United States, Independent Jewish Voices in Canada, Independent Jewish Voices in the United Kingdom, and the International Jewish Anti-Zionist Network provided a renewed platform for left-wing Jewish anti-Zionism. This perspective continues to be represented in media outlets such as the American Mondoweiss and the Canadian Treyf podcast.

The Israeli left has also played a role in social movements, including the 2011 Israeli social justice protests and the 2023 Israeli judicial reform protests. Activists from the 2011 protests, particularly those affiliated with Hadash, established Standing Together in 2015.

==== In Britain ====
Under the government of Blair's successor, Gordon Brown, brothers David Miliband and Ed Miliband became members of the Cabinet. Their father was the Marxist academic Ralph Miliband. The brothers differed in their view of the party's future direction, and they fought a bitter leadership election against each other in 2010. Ed Miliband won the election and became the first Jewish leader of the Labour Party. One of Miliband's Shadow Cabinet members, Ivan Lewis, as well as advisers David Axelrod, Arnie Graf, and The Lord Glasman are all Jewish.

Recent Jewish Labour politicians include William Bach, The Lord Bassam of Brighton, Michael Cashman, The Lord Grabiner, Ruth Henig, Margaret Hodge, The Lord Kestenbaum, Jonathan Mendelsohn, Janet Neel Cohen, Meta Ramsay, Ruth Smeeth, Alex Sobel, Catherine Stihler, Andrew Stone, Leslie Turnberg, and Robert Winston.

Since the foundation of the Liberal Democrats, several Jews have achieved prominence: David Alliance, Luciana Berger, the aforementioned Alex Carlisle, Miranda Green, Olly Grender, Sally Hamwee, Evan Harris, Susan Kramer, Anthony Lester, Jonathan Marks, Julia Neuberger, Monroe Palmer, Paul Strasburger, and Lynne Featherstone, who became a Minister in the Cameron–Clegg coalition.

==== 2014-2023: Aftermath of the 2014 Gaza War and 2016 presidential election ====
Following the 2014 Gaza War, some leftist Jewish organizations in the United States and Canada shifted their focus to directly challenging Zionist Jewish organizations over the groups' support for the State of Israel's actions during the war.

While a majority of American Jews during this period continued to report feeling attached to the State of Israel, younger generations increasingly voiced criticism of the Israeli government and expressed greater sympathy for Palestinians compared to their predecessors.

These intra-community tensions extended into domestic politics following the 2016 United States presidential election. Groups such as IfNotNow, Jewish Voice for Peace, and Jews for Racial and Economic Justice began organizing under the banner of "#JewishResistance", aiming to challenge extant institutional Jewish support for the first presidency of Donald Trump and its associations with white nationalist figures.

After the 2016 election, liberal and leftist Jewish organizations with a range of positions on Zionism experienced significant growth in the United States. New Jewish initiatives emerged, including Never Again Action, which focused on opposing the expansion of migrant detention by the United States government. Several Jewish organizations, including Bend the Arc, T'ruah, JFREJ, Jewish Voice for Peace, and IfNotNow, joined these efforts under the banner of "#JewsAgainstICE". Other initiatives, such as the Outlive Them network, Fayer, and the Muslim-Jewish Anti-Fascist Front, were established to address antisemitism and white nationalism.

This period also saw the rise of new leftist Jewish media outlets. Protocols, a journal of culture and politics, began publishing in 2017. Jewish Currents, originally founded in 1946, was relaunched in 2018 by a new editorial team of millennial Jews. The Treyf podcast, which started in 2015, documented the Jewish left's growth in the United States during this time.

There was also a renewed interest in Jewish anarchism within the United States. This resurgence was supported by new publications, such as Kenyon Zimmer's Immigrants Against the State (2015), and the reissuing of documentaries like The Free Voice of Labor, which chronicles the final days of the Fraye Arbeter Shtime. In January 2019, YIVO hosted a conference on Yiddish anarchism in New York City, which attracted over 450 attendees. Following this event, a national Jewish anarchist convergence was organized in Chicago.

== Contemporary Jewish left ==
=== North America ===
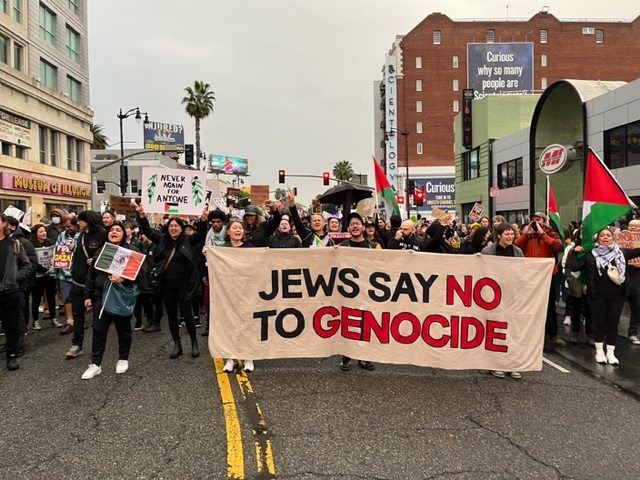
November 15, 2023, protest with Jewish Voice for Peace and If Not Now on Hollywood Blvd

A new wave of the resurgence of Jewish left-wing activism emerged in late 2023, coinciding with the Israeli invasion of the Gaza Strip following the October 7 attacks. According to Jay Ulfelder, this period marked "the largest and broadest pro-Palestinian mobilization in U.S. history". This movement included the largest recorded Jewish American demonstration in support of Palestine and the largest pro-Palestinian demonstration in U.S. history, the National March on Washington: Free Palestine. Several new Jewish leftist organizations and coalitions were established, including Jews Say No to Genocide (Toronto), the Tzedek Collective (Victoria, British Columbia), Gliklekh in Goles (Vancouver), Shoresh (United States), and Rabbis for Ceasefire (United States), while existing anti-Zionist Jewish groups, such as Jewish Voice for Peace, experienced significant membership growth.

During this period, traditionally liberal Zionist Jewish groups generally adopted positions supporting the State of Israel. Groups such as J Street and the Anti-Defamation League opposed calls for a ceasefire and expressed support for continued Israeli military operations in Gaza, leading to internal dissent and staff resignations. By January 2024, J Street had advocated for a qualified end to Israel's military campaign, while the Anti-Defamation League maintained its opposition to anti-Zionist and other Jewish leftist groups calling for a ceasefire, characterizing some as "hate groups" and collaborating with law enforcement to oppose the 2024 pro-Palestinian protests on university campuses.

The Progressive Israel Network, a coalition of ten liberal and progressive Zionist Jewish organizations—including Ameinu, Americans for Peace Now, Habonim Dror North America, Hashomer Hatzair, The Jewish Labor Committee, J Street, the New Israel Fund, Partners for Progressive Israel, Reconstructing Judaism, and T'ruah—was established in 2019. Many of these organizations experienced internal debate regarding their positions on Israel in the years leading up to the war in Gaza. Following the onset of Israeli military operations in Gaza, staff members from nearly all Progressive Israel Network organizations signed an open letter advocating for a ceasefire. Several of these groups participated in the 2023 March for Israel during the war under the banner of a "Peace Bloc". Reporting on the event for Jewish Currents, journalist Mari Cohen observed that by "attending the November 14th March for Israel and refusing to call for a ceasefire, many progressive Jewish groups have cast their lot with the Jewish mainstream".

=== United Kingdom ===
Jewish groups on the left include Independent Jewish Voices, Jewdas, the Jewish Socialists' Group, Jewish Voice for Labour and Jews for Justice for Palestinians. The Jewish Labour Movement is affiliated to the Labour Party.

== See also ==
- American Jews in politics
- Chutzpah Collective
- Cosmopolitanism
- Der jüdische Arbeiter (Vienna)
- Der royter shtern (Buenos Aires)
- Der yidisher arbeyter (Paris)
- Dos Abend Blatt
- Folks-Ligue
- Hebrew Socialist Union in London
- History of the Jews in Russia and the Soviet Union
- Independent Australian Jewish Voices
- Internationalism (politics)
- Jewish anti-racism
- Jewish conservatism
- Jewish pro-Palestinian activism
- Judaism and politics
- Jewish Anti-Zionist League
- Jewish political movements
- Liberalism in Israel
- List of Jewish feminists
- Naivelt
- Progressive Jewish Thought and the New Anti-Semitism
- Self-hating Jew
- Socialism in Israel
- Undzer emes
- Yevsektsiya
- Vochenblatt
