= Jennifer S. Hirsch =

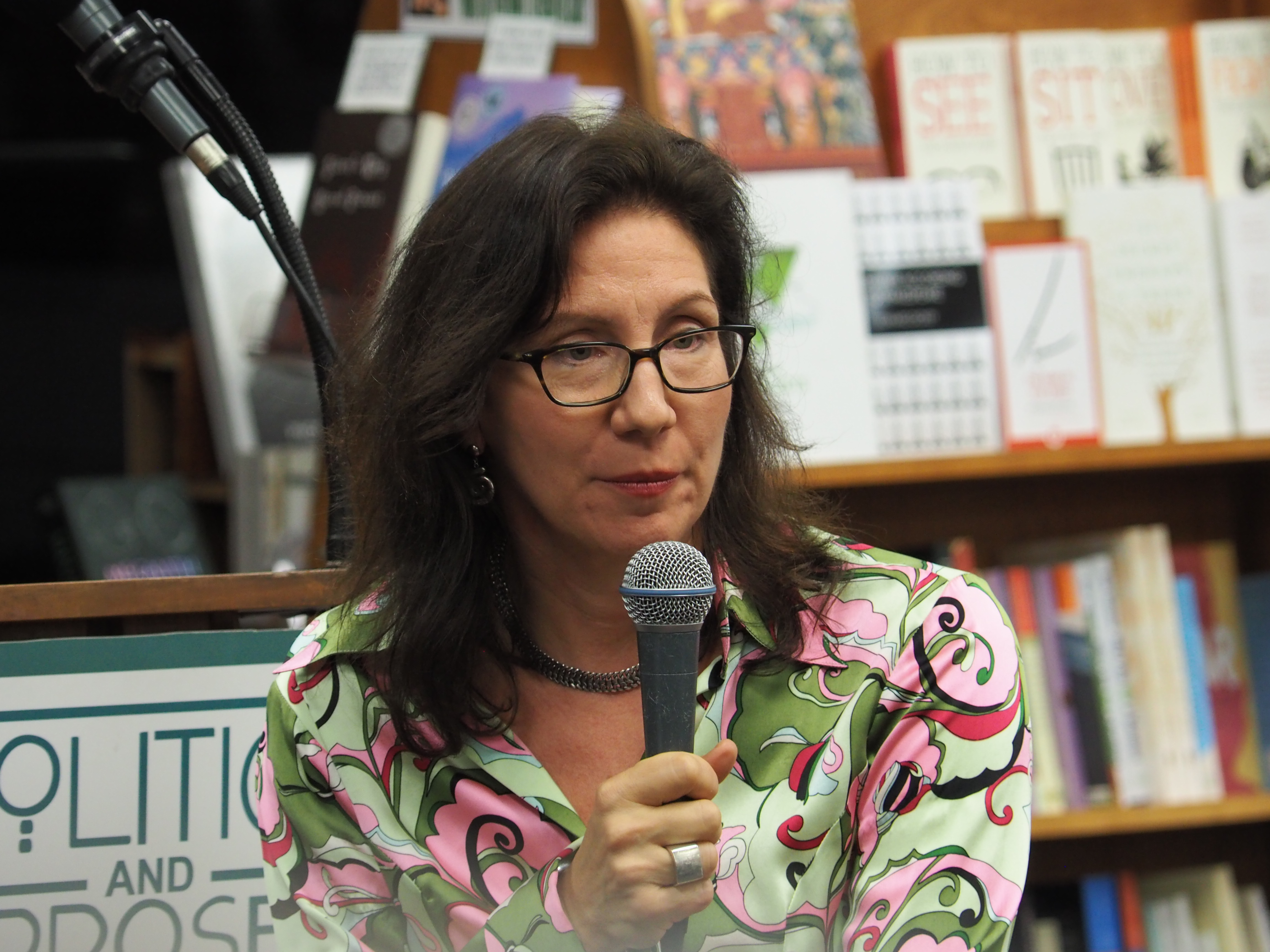
- Hirsch speaks at Politics & Prose in Washington, D.C., in January 2020
- Born: 1967 (age 58–59); New York, New York
- Occupations: Researcher, professor, social justice advocate
- Board member of: Jews for Racial and Economic Justice (2014-2020)
- Awards: Guggenheim Fellow 2012

Academic background
- Education: Johns Hopkins University, Ph.D. Princeton University B.A
- Alma mater: Princeton University, Johns Hopkins University

Academic work
- Institutions: Deputy Chair for Doctoral Studies, Department of Sociomedical Sciences, Mailman School of Public Health, Columbia University
- Main interests: Community health, global health, HIV/AIDS, maternal and reproductive health, LGBT health
- Notable works: Sexual Citizens: Sex, Power and Assault on Campus; A Courtship After Marriage: Sexuality and Love in Mexican Transnational Families

Jennifer Hirsch is a professor of Sociomedical Sciences at the Mailman School of Public Health at Columbia University. From 2010 to 2024, she directed Sociomedical Sciences's doctoral programs. She currently co-directs the Columbia Center for Population Research. Hirsch also co-directed the Sexual Health Initiative to Foster Transformation. Her work spans topics such as gender, human sexuality, and public health. Her book, A Courtship After Marriage: Sexuality and Love in Mexican Transnational Families, which has been used widely in college classrooms, explores the lives of Mexican women in Atlanta and rural Mexico, with a focus on changing ideas of marriage among Latinx couples. Hirsch served on the Board of Directors of Jews for Racial and Economic Justice from 2014 to 2020 (and as board chair from 2018 to 2020) and is a member of B'nai Jeshurun

== Books ==
=== Authored or co-authored ===
- Hirsch, Jennifer S. A Courtship After Marriage: Sexuality and Love in Mexican Transnational Families. Berkeley: University of California Press, 2003.
- Hirsch, Jennifer S., Daniel J. Smith, Holly Wardlow, Shanti Parikh, Harriet Phinney, and Constance A. Nathanson. 2009. The Secret: Love, Marriage, and HIV. Nashville, Vanderbilt University Press.
- Hirsch, Jennifer S., and Shamus Khan. 2020. Sexual Citizens: A Landmark Study of Sex, Power, and Assault on Campus. W. W. Norton & Company.

=== Edited or co-edited ===
- Hirsch, Jennifer S. and Holly Wardlow. 2006. (Eds.): Modern Loves: The Anthropology of Romantic Courtship and Companionate Marriage. Ann Arbor: University of Michigan Press. ISBN 978-0472069590
- Padilla, Mark, Jennifer S. Hirsch, Robert Sember, Miguel Muñoz-Laboy and Richard Parker, eds. 2007. Love and Globalization: Transformations of Intimacy in the Contemporary World. Vanderbilt University Press. ISBN 978-0826515858

== Publications ==
=== Original peer reviewed articles (selected) ===
- Hirsch, Jennifer S.; Nathanson, Constance A. (1998). "Demografía informal: cómo utilizar las redes sociales para construir una muestra etnográfica sistemática de mujeres mexicanas en ambos lados de la frontera". Estudios Demograficos y de Desarollo Urbano. 12 (1&2): 177–99.
- Hirsch, Jennifer S (1999). "En El Norte La Mujer Manda: Gender, Generation and Geography in a Mexican Transnational Community". American Behavioral Scientist. 42 (9): 1332–49. doi:10.1177/00027649921954930.
- Hirsch, Jennifer S.; Nathanson, Constance A. (2001). "Some Traditional Methods are More Modern than Others: Rhythm, Withdrawal and the Changing Meanings of Gender and Sexual Intimacy in the Mexican Companionate Marriage". Culture, Health & Sexuality. 3 (4): 413–28. doi:10.1080/13691050110074228.
- Hirsch, J.S.; Higgins, J; Bentley, M; Nathanson, C. (2002). "The Cultural Constructions of Sexuality: Marital Infidelity and STD/HIV Risk in a Mexican Migrant Community". American Journal of Public Health. 92 (8): 1227–1237. doi:10.2105/AJPH.92.8.1227. PMC 1447220. PMID 12144974.
- Hirsch, Jennifer S (2002). "'Que, pues, con el pinche NAFTA?: Gender, Power and Migration between Western Mexico and Atlanta". Urban Anthropology. 31 (3–4): 351–87.
- Santelli, John; Rochat, Roger; Hatfield-Timajchy, Kendra; Colley Gilbert, Brenda; Curtis, Kathryn; Cabral, Rebecca; Hirsch, Jennifer S; Schieve, Laura; et al. (2003). "The Measurement and Meaning of Unintended Pregnancy: A Review and Critique". Perspectives on Sexual and Reproductive Health. 35 (2): 94–101. doi:10.1363/3509403. PMID 12729139.
- Hirsch, Jennifer S.; Meneses, Sergio; Thompson, Brenda; Negroni, Mirka; Pelcastre, Blanca; Carlos (2007). "The Inevitability of Infidelity: Sexual Reputation, Social Geographies, and Marital HIV Risk in Rural Mexico". American Journal of Public Health. 97 (6): 986–96. doi:10.2105/AJPH.2006.088492. PMC 1874214. PMID 17463368.
- Hirsch, Jennifer S.; Parker, Richard G.; Aggleton, Peter (2007). "Social Aspects of ART Scale-up: Introduction and Overview". AIDS. 21 (suppl 5): S1–S4. doi:10.1097/01.aids.0000298096.51728.7d. PMID 18090262.
- Hirsch, Jennifer S (2007). "Gender, Sexuality, and Anti-Retroviral Therapy: Using Social Science to Enhance Outcomes and Inform Secondary Prevention Strategies". AIDS. 21 (suppl 5): S21–S29. doi:10.1097/01.aids.0000298099.48990.99. PMID 18090264.
- Higgins, Jennifer; Hirsch, Jennifer S. (2007). "The Pleasure Deficit: Revisiting the Sexuality Connection in Reproductive Health". International Family Planning Perspectives. 33 (3): 133–9. doi:10.1363/3313307. PMID 17938096.
- Higgins, Jennifer; Hirsch, Jennifer S. (2007). "The Pleasure Deficit: Revisiting the Sexuality Connection in Reproductive Health". Perspectives on Sexual and Reproductive Health. 39 (4): 240–247. doi:10.1363/3924007. PMID 18093041.
- Markosyan, Karine M.; Babikian, Tallinn; DiClemente, Ralph J.; Hirsch, Jennifer S.; Grigoryan, Samvel; del Rio, Carlos (2007). "Correlates of HIV risk and preventive behaviors in Armenian female sex workers". AIDS and Behavior. 11 (2): 325–334. doi:10.1007/s10461-006-9147-x. PMID 16823626.
- Sandfort; Mark Orr, Theo G. M.; Hirsch, Jennifer S; Santelli, John (2008). "Long-term health consequences of timing of sexual initiation: Results from a national U.S. Study". American Journal of Public Health. 98 (1): 155–161. doi:10.2105/AJPH.2006.097444. PMC 2156059. PMID 18048793.
- Higgins, Jennifer; Hirsch, Jennifer S. (2008). "Pleasure and Power: Incorporating Sexuality, Agency and Inequality into Research on Contraceptive Use and Unintended Pregnancy". American Journal of Public Health. 90 (10): 1803–1813. doi:10.2105/AJPH.2007.115790. PMC 2636476. PMID 18703457.
- Higgins, Jennifer; Hirsch, Jennifer S.; Trussell, James (2008). "Pleasure, Prophylaxis, and Procreation: A Qualitative Analysis of Intermittent Contraceptive use and Unintended Pregnancy". Perspectives on Sexual and Reproductive Health. 40 (3): 130–137. doi:10.1363/4013008. PMC 5523012. PMID 18803794.
- Hirsch, Jennifer S (2008). "'Contracepting as Catholics': Anthropological perspectives on the study of religion's effect on fertility and contraceptive method preferences". Studies in Family Planning. 39 (2): 93–104. doi:10.1111/j.1728-4465.2008.00156.x. PMID 18678173.
- Hirsch, Jennifer S., Miguel Muñoz Laboy, Christina M. Nyhus, Kathryn M. Yount, and Jose Bauermeister. 2009. Because He Misses His Normal Life Back Home: Masculinity and Sexual Behavior among Mexican Migrants in Atlanta, Georgia. Perspectives in Sexual and Reproductive Health. 41(1):23-32 (NIHMS133864)
- Steward, Wayne T.; Remien, Robert H.; Higgins, Jenny A.; Dubrow, Robert; Pinkerton, Steven D.; Sikkema, Kathleen J; Truong, Hong-Ha M.; Johnson, Mallory O.; Hirsch, Jennifer; Brooks, Ronald A.; Morin, Stephen F. (2009). "Behavior Change Following Diagnosis with Acute/Early HIV Infection-A Move to Serosorting with Other HIV-Infected Individuals. The NIMH Multisite Acute HIV Infection Study: III". AIDS and Behavior. 13 (6): 1054–1060. doi:10.1007/s10461-009-9582-6. PMC 2785897. PMID 19504178.
- Muñoz Laboy, Miguel; Hirsch, Jennifer S.; Arturo Quispe-Lazaro, A. (2009). "Loneliness as a Sexual Risk Factor for Mexican Male Workers". American Journal of Public Health. 99 (5): 802–810. doi:10.2105/AJPH.2007.122283. PMC 2667832. PMID 19299684.
- Taylor, BS; Garduño, LS; Reyes, EV; Valiño, R; Rojas, R; Donastorg, Y; Brudney, K; Hirsch, J (2011). "HIV care for geographically mobile populations". Mt Sinai J Med. 78 (3): 342–51. doi:10.1002/msj.20255. PMC 3100665. PMID 21598261.
- West, BS; Hirsch, JS; El-Sadr, W (2012). "HIV and H_{2}O: Tracing the connections between gender, water and HIV". AIDS and Behavior. 17 (5): 1675–82. doi:10.1007/s10461-012-0219-9. PMC 6330213. PMID 22660934.
- Nambiar, Devaki, Mai Huong Nguyen, Le Minh Giang, Jennifer Hirsch, and Richard G. Parker. "Tabula Diptycha: Differential HIV Knowledge, Stigma and Intended Behavioural Outcomes Amongst Visitors at Vietnam's Pain and Hope Exhibition." Global Public Health 8 (S1):S46-60.
- Le Minh Giang, Jennifer S. Hirsch, Richard G. Parker and Emily E. Vasquez. 2013. Social and Policy Dimensions of HIV in Vietnam. 8(S1): S1-S6.
- Dao, Amy, Le Minh Giang, J. S. Hirsch, and R Parker. 2013. "Social Science Research of HIV in Vietnam: A Critical Review and Future Directions." Global Public Health 8(S1): S7-S29
- Vasquez, Emily; Hirsch, Jennifer; Giang, Le; Parker, Richard (2013). "Rethinking Health Research Capacity Strengthening". Global Public Health. 8 (Suppl 1): S104–24. doi:10.1080/17441692.2013.786117. PMC 3778121. PMID 23651463.
- Phinney, Harriet M.; Thu Hong, Khuat; Thị Thanh Nhàn, Vũ; Thị Phương Thảo, Nguyễn; Hirsch, Jennifer S. (2014). "Obstacles to the 'cleanliness of our race': HIV stigma, stratified reproduction, and population quality in Hanoi, Vietnam". Critical Public Health. 24 (4): 445–460. doi:10.1080/09581596.2013.846464. PMC 4217129. PMID 25378810.
- Hirsch, Jennifer S (2014). "Labor migration, externalities and ethics: Theorizing the meso-level determinants of HIV vulnerability. 2014". Social Science and Medicine. 100: 38–45. doi:10.1016/j.socscimed.2013.10.021. PMC 4001245. PMID 24444837. NIHMS #536685
- Taylor, Barbara S.; Reyes, Emily V.; Levine, Elizabeth A.; Khan, Shah Z.; Valino, Raziel; Garduno, Donastorg; Sergio, L.; Yeycy, Brudney; Karen, Hirsch; Jennifer, S. (2014). "Patterns of Geographic Mobility Predict Structural Barriers to HIV Care in Mobile Populations". AIDS Patient Care and STDs. 28 (6): 284–295. doi:10.1089/apc.2014.0028. PMC 4046197. PMID 24839872.
- Hirsch, Jennifer S.; Giang, Parker; Minh, Le; Richard, G.; Duong, Le Bach (2015). "Caught in the Middle: The Contested Politics of HIV/AIDS and Health Policy in Vietnam". Journal of Health Care Politics, Policy and Law. 40 (1): 13–40. doi:10.1215/03616878-2854447. PMC 4352397. PMID 25480849.
- Elkington, Kate; Belmonte, K.; Latack, J. A.; Mellins, C. A.; Wasserman, G. A.; Donenberg, G. R.; Hirsch, J. S. (2014). "An exploration of family and juvenile justice systems to reduce youth HIV/STI risk". Journal of Research on Adolescence. 25 (4): 700–716. doi:10.1111/jora.12163. PMC 4628815. PMID 26539022.
- Hirsch, J.S. 2015. Desire Across Borders: Markets, Migration, and Marital HIV Risk in Rural Mexico. Culture, Health & Sexuality 17 (S1):20-33
- Sommer, M; Hirsch, J; Nathanson, C; Parker, R (2015). "Comfortably, safely and without shame: Defining menstrual hygiene management as a public health issue". American Journal of Public Health. 105 (7): 1302–11. doi:10.2105/AJPH.2014.302525. PMC 4463372. PMID 25973831.
- Garcia, J; Colson, PW; Parker, C; Hirsch, JS (2015). "Passing the baton: Community-based ethnography to design a randomized clinical trial on the effectiveness of oral pre-exposure prophylaxis for HIV prevention among Black men who have sex with men". Contemp Clin Trials. 45 (Pt B): 244–251. doi:10.1016/j.cct.2015.10.005. PMC 4674295. PMID 26476286.
- Garcia, J; Parker, C; Parker, RG; Wilson, PA; Philbin, MM; Hirsch, JS (2015). ""You're Really Gonna Kick Us All Out?" Sustaining Safe Spaces for Community-Based HIV Prevention and Control among Black Men Who Have Sex with Men". PLOS ONE. 10 (10) e0141326. doi:10.1371/journal.pone.0141326. PMC 4619623. PMID 26492412. Garcia, J; Parker, C; Parker, RG; Wilson, PA; Philbin, MM; Hirsch, JS (2015). ""You're Really Gonna Kick Us All Out?" Sustaining Safe Spaces for Community-Based HIV Prevention and Control among Black Men Who Have Sex with Men". PLOS ONE. 10 (10) e0141326. doi:10.1371/journal.pone.0141326. PMC 4619623. PMID 26492412..
- Garcia, J; Parker, RG; Parker, C; Wilson, PA; Philbin, M; Hirsch, JS (2016). "The limitations of 'Black MSM' as a category: Why gender, sexuality, and desire still matter for social and biomedical HIV prevention methods". Glob Public Health. 11 (7–8): 1026–48. doi:10.1080/17441692.2015.1134616. PMC 4931953. PMID 26831639.. Garcia, J; Parker, RG; Parker, C; Wilson, PA; Philbin, M; Hirsch, JS (2016). "The limitations of 'Black MSM' as a category: Why gender, sexuality, and desire still matter for social and biomedical HIV prevention methods". Glob Public Health. 11 (7–8): 1026–48. doi:10.1080/17441692.2015.1134616. PMC 4931953. PMID 26831639.
- Garcia, J; Parker, C; Parker, RG; Wilson, PA; Philbin, M; Hirsch, JS (2016). "Psychosocial Implications of Homophobia and HIV Stigma in Social Support Networks: Insights for High-Impact HIV Prevention Among Black Men Who Have Sex With Men". Health Educ Behav. 43 (2): 217–25. doi:10.1177/1090198115599398. PMC 4973624. PMID 27037286.. Garcia, J; Parker, C; Parker, RG; Wilson, PA; Philbin, M; Hirsch, JS (2016). "Psychosocial Implications of Homophobia and HIV Stigma in Social Support Networks: Insights for High-Impact HIV Prevention Among Black Men Who Have Sex With Men". Health Educ Behav. 43 (2): 217–25. doi:10.1177/1090198115599398. PMC 4973624. PMID 27037286.
- Philbin, MM; Parker, CM; Parker, RG; Wilson, PA; Garcia, J; Hirsch, JS (2016). "The Promise of Pre-Exposure Prophylaxis for Black Men Who Have Sex with Men: An Ecological Approach to Attitudes, Beliefs, and Barriers". AIDS Patient Care STDs. 30 (6): 282–90. doi:10.1089/apc.2016.0037. PMC 4913505. PMID 27220036. Philbin, M. M.; Parker, C. M.; Parker, R. G.; Wilson, P. A.; Garcia, J.; Hirsch, J. S. (2016). "The Promise of Pre-Exposure Prophylaxis for Black Men Who Have Sex with Men: An Ecological Approach to Attitudes, Beliefs, and Barriers". Aids Patient Care and STDs. 30 (6): 282–290. doi:10.1089/apc.2016.0037. PMC 4913505. PMID 27220036.
- Galeucia, Megan; Hirsch, Jennifer S. (2016). "State and Local Policies as a Structural and Modifiable Determinant of HIV Vulnerability Among Latino Migrants in the United States". American Journal of Public Health. 106 (5): 800–807. doi:10.2105/AJPH.2016.303081. PMC 4985077. PMID 26985616.
- Parker, Caroline; Garcia, Jonathan; Philbin, Morgan; Wilson, Patrick; Parker, Richard G.; Hirsch, Jennifer (2017). "Social risk, stigma and space: Key concepts for understanding HIV vulnerability among Black Men who have Sex Men in New York City". Culture, Health & Sexuality. 19 (3): 323–337. doi:10.1080/13691058.2016.1216604. PMC 5415078. PMID 27550415.
- Hatzenbuehler, Mark L.; Prins, Seth J.; Flake, Morgan; Philbin, Morgan; Frazer, M. Somjen; Hagen, Daniel; Hirsch, Jennifer S. (2017). "Immigration Policies and Mental Health Morbidity Among Latinos: A state-level analysis". Social Science and Medicine. 174: 169–17. doi:10.1016/j.socscimed.2016.11.040. PMC 5258771. PMID 28043019.

== Awards ==
- Carole H. Browner Graduate Student Mentorship Award, Society for Medical Anthropology, 2023
- Selected as one of New York City's 16 'Heroes in the Fight Against Gender-Based Violence' by Chirlaine McCray, First Lady of New York, November 26, 2017
- Public Voices Fellow. Columbia University and the Op-Ed project. New York City, January – December 2015
- Gray Wawro Lecture on Gender, Health, and Wellbeing, Center for the Study of Women, Gender and Sexuality, Rice University, Houston, Texas, April 24, 2014
- Fellow, John Simon Guggenheim Memorial Foundation, 2012
- George and Mary Foster Distinguished Lecture in Cultural Anthropology, Southern Methodist University, Dallas Texas, April 13, 2011
- CHOICE Outstanding Academic Title of 2010 Award for "The Secret: Love, Marriage and HIV," 2010
- Honorable Mention, California Public Anthropology Competition for "Across Borders" (Book Proposal), 2009
- Outstanding Young Professional Award, Population, Family Planning and Reproductive Health Section, American Public Health Association, November 2002.
- Paul and Esther Harper Endowment Award, Department of Population Dynamics and Family Health Sciences, Johns Hopkins University, May 1999.
- Carl S. Schultz Award, Department of Population Dynamics, Johns Hopkins University,1997.
- Poster Award Winner, Population Association of America, Annual Meeting, Washington, DC, March 1997.
- Graduated summa cum laude and elected to membership in Phi Beta Kappa, Princeton University, June 1988.
