= Jews Against White Nationalism =

U.S. Jewish anti-racist organization

- Founded: 2019; 7 years ago
- Dissolved: 2025; 1 year ago
- Type: Nonprofit
- Headquarters: United States
- Leader: Sophie Ellman-Golan

Jews Against White Nationalism (JAWN) was a Jewish anti-racist project based in the United States fiscally incubated by Jews for Racial and Economic Justice (JFREJ) to organize and fight against antisemitism on the far-right.

== History ==
JAWN was founded in 2019 and led by Sophie Ellman-Golan. The organization was founded in reaction to the Presidency of Donald Trump and the increase of antisemitism within American politics.

In 2019, Donald Trump signed an executive order to deny aid to colleges that tolerate antisemitism, an action viewed by critics as an effort to stifle criticism of Israel. JAWN's Ellman-Golan stated that "This is not 'protecting Judaism under civil rights law...This is using Jews and Judaism as a shield to go after Palestinians and anti-authoritarian professors and student activists." The Reconstructionist rabbi Ellen Lippman has served as an advisor to the group.

In a 2019 opinion piece, New York Times columnist Michelle Goldberg credited Donald Trump for reviving the Jewish left in the United States. She quoted Jawn's Ellman-Golan saying that while antisemitism does exist within left-wing politics, "only one political party is quite literally inciting white nationalists to shoot up our synagogues, drive cars into our peaceful protests, mail bombs to members of our community, burn black churches and mosques, and open fire on Latinx people."

JAWN participated in the 2020 George Floyd protests in Nebraska. On August 3 in Lincoln, Nebraska, JAWN and other protestors chanted and banged drums outside of a city council meeting where activists testified against a police budget increase proposed by mayor Leirion Gaylor Baird.

== See also ==
- Bend the Arc
- Jewish left
