= JFJ =

JFJ may refer to:

- Jews for Jesus, a Christian evangelical organization based in San Francisco, California
- John Ferguson, Jr., ice hockey executive
- Jewish Funds for Justice, a national Jewish foundation
