= Simon Greer =

Simon Greer (born 1968) is an American labor and community organizer and social change leader. As the founder of Cambridge Heath Ventures, he works with “private sector companies, purpose driven organizations and governments to help them overcome their most pressing challenges."

Greer was executive director of NYC Jobs with Justice before serving as the president and CEO of Jewish Funds for Justice (now Bend the Arc). He also previously served as president and CEO of the Nathan Cummings Foundation. Greer holds position seven on 2011′s “Forward 50”, The Jewish Daily Forward′s list of the fifty most significant Jews in the United States.

== Early life and education ==
Greer is the son of Jewish parents who immigrated to the US from the United Kingdom. He grew up in New York on Manhattan’s Upper West Side. He attended Ethical Culture Fieldston School and graduated from Vassar College in 1990.

His father is Colin Greer, who runs the New World Foundation.

== Career ==
After his graduation Greer went to Poland, the country his grandparents had fled from, to work for Solidarność. Back in the United States after two years, he continued his activities as a labor and community organizer and social change leader, working for unions in South Carolina, the nonprofit organizing group Jobs with Justice in Washington, D.C. and New York, and founded the volunteer group Jews United for Justice in Washington, D.C.

In April 2005, Greer became president and CEO of the Jewish Funds for Justice (JFSJ). He transformed the organization from a relatively small private charitable foundation into an organization with a $6.5 million budget, merging it with several other organizations. He expanded the foundation into more active areas such as leadership training and service learning.

Greer gained national prominence in the U.S. during JFSJ’s high-profile campaign against Glenn Beck, denouncing his allegedly anti-Semitic rhetoric and his invocations of the Holocaust on Fox News. The campaign ended with Beck’s leaving Fox News.

In January 2012, Greer became the president and CEO of the Nathan Cummings Foundation. In June 2014, he departed due to differences with the board over the future directions of the foundation. In an email about his departure Greer wrote, “In recent months, it became clear that my vision and the Board’s vision for the Foundation had diverged. Despite our agreement around much of the substance of the Foundation’s new direction, we were increasingly unaligned around the hard choices that are inevitably part of implementation."

In 2015, Greer founded Cambridge Heath Ventures, a strategic advisory firm. Clients have included the Diverse Asset Managers initiative (DAMI), an initiative created to encourage institutional investors to invest with diverse-owned asset management firms. Greer co-authored the Fiduciary Guide to Investing with Diverse Asset Managers and Firms, a guide for fiduciaries interested in exploring the possibilities of investing institutional assets in diverse-owned firms. Greer also advises Fair Care Labs, the innovation arm of the National Domestic Workers Alliance, on private sector engagement.

Greer focuses on "common good politics."

== Writings ==
Greer has written numerous papers and opinion pieces, including "The stain of anti-Semitism at the White House isn't going away," "Why Is Netanyahu Allying Himself With anti-Soros anti-Semites?," "Union and conservative, better together: What happens inside the life of a union is vital for politics of our future", "The Democratic Party Should Adopt These 4 Priorities to Win Back Blue-Collar Voters," "Is there common ground on the immigration debate between conservatives and progressives?," and "Beyond Trump: What's unravelling America and what we can do about it."

Greer is a writing fellow with the Independent Media Institute, where he is working on an editorial project called "Face to Face," exploring "the spiritual, religious and moral dimensions of social change and the progressive movement."

== Boards ==
Greer is a board member of the Public Religion Research Institute (PRRI) and an advisory board member of the John Curtin Research Centre.

== Personal life ==
Greer is married to Sharna Goldseker, Executive Director of 21/64 and co-author of Generation Impact: How Next Gen Donors are Revolutionizing Giving. They have two children and live in New York City.
