= Jews for Racial and Economic Justice =

American Jewish left-wing organization

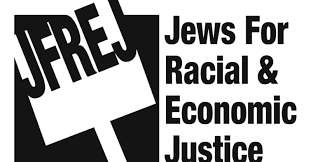
- Founded: 1990; 36 years ago
- Type: Nonprofit
- Headquarters: New York City, NY, U.S.
- Executive Director: Audrey Sasson
- Volunteers: 6,000+
- Website: www.jfrej.org

Jews for Racial and Economic Justice (JFREJ) is an American left-wing non-profit grassroots Jewish organization based in New York City. JFREJ describes itself as a "movement to dismantle racism and economic exploitation". It operates both a 501(c)(3), also known as JFREJ Community and a 501(c)(4) known as JFREJ Action.

== History ==
JFREJ was founded in New York City in 1990. Melanie Kaye/Kantrowitz served as the organization's first director. While initially focused on local issues, JFREJ's first event was a Shabbat gathering honoring Nelson Mandela during his visit to New York City in June 1990. Mandela's visit drew mixed reactions from the local Jewish community, with organizations including the Anti-Defamation League, the American Jewish Committee, the American Jewish Congress, and the Union of American Hebrew Congregations requested him to clarify his stance on Israel following recent interactions with Palestine Liberation Organization Chairman Yasser Arafat and Libyan president Muammar Gaddafi. Some members of New York City's Jewish community protested Mandela during his visit. To counter to this response, JFREJ's first event, held on June 15, 1990, honored Mandela and raised $50,000 for the anti-apartheid movement.

Following the 1999 killing of Amadou Diallo by four New York City Police Department officers, JFREJ began organizing its members to address issues of police brutality and advocate for police accountability. On March 24, 1999, 126 JFREJ members were among the 212 individuals arrested during protests against Diallo's death, as reported by The New York Times.

Between the early 2000s and 2010, Jews for Racial and Economic Justice (JFREJ) participated in the campaign led by Domestic Workers United (DWU) to pass the Domestic Worker's Bill of Rights in New York State. JFREJ began collaborating with DWU in 2002 and supported the passage of a New York City Council resolution for domestic workers' rights in 2003–2004. JFREJ worked with Jewish employers of domestic workers to improve employment practices and advocate alongside domestic workers to secure the legislation. After the bill's successful passage, Ai-jen Poo of the National Domestic Workers Alliance and JFREJ members who had been organizing domestic employers established Hand in Hand: The Domestic Employers Network.

In October 2012, JFREJ began working with Communities United for Police Reform (CPR) to oppose stop-and-frisk in New York City.

From its founding through the mid-2010s, JFREJ primarily consisted of white Jews and engaged with non-white communities through partnerships with non-Jewish organizations. In 2014, Leo Ferguson joined the organization to promote greater inclusion of the diversity within the Jewish community. By 2020, this effort resulted in increased diversity within JFREJ's membership, the establishment of a Jews of Color caucus led by Ferguson, and a staff composition that included 3 Jews of color out of a total of 9 staff members.

During the first presidency of Donald Trump, JFREJ was active in protests against the Trump travel ban and as part of the movement to Abolish ICE.

In 2019, Alexandria Ocasio-Cortez spoke at a JFREJ event where she discussed her Puerto Rican ancestors' distant Sephardi Jewish heritage.

Following the Monsey Hanukkah stabbing in 2019, Audrey Sasson, JFREJ executive director, opposed increased police presence as a response to antisemitism, expressing concerns that such measures could make Black Jews and other Jews of color feel unsafe.

In June 2022, the Anti-Defamation League condemned JFREJ as "out of touch" with mainstream American Jewish opinion. ADL CEO Jonathan Greenblatt retweeted a Twitter thread describing JFREJ and the Jewish Vote as a "far-left scam." An ADL spokesperson later affirmed the organization's stance that JFREJ does not represent Jewish opinion or values. Sophie Ellman-Golan, JFREJ's communications director, responded by criticizing the ADL for questioning the Jewish identity of JFREJ members.

In the 2025 New York City Democratic mayoral primary, JFREJ endorsed both Brad Lander and Zohran Mamdani.

== Initiatives ==
=== The Jewish Vote ===
The Jewish Vote is the electoral arm of JFREJ. They endorse and support candidates who advocate for policies such as universal health care, universal rent control, a Green New Deal, publicly funded elections, fair wages and working conditions, and the end of mass incarceration and the criminalization of people of color.

The Jewish Vote played a significant role in Jamaal Bowman's successful 2020 primary campaign in New York's 16th Congressional District. Before launching his campaign, Bowman met with JFREJ members to discuss Jewish history and antisemitism. During the campaign, 100 JFREJ members volunteered under the banner #JewsForJamaal to support his candidacy.

=== Fair Pay for Home Care ===
As a member of the NY Caring Majority Coalition, JFREJ advocated for the passage of the Fair Pay for Home Care Act in New York State, which proposed increasing home care workers' wages to 150% of the minimum wage. The wage increase did not reach the target of 150% in 2022, with the state budget including a $8 billion investment over four years to raise wages for home care workers.

=== Fighting antisemitism and white nationalism ===
JFREJ has provided advice to the White House on combating antisemitism.

In collaboration with other Jewish organizations, JFREJ co-sponsored the Jews Against White Nationalism project.

In 2019, JFREJ launched NYC Against Hate, a coalition of community-based organizations focused on enhancing safety for minority communities in New York City. The initiative received over $1 million in funding from the New York City Council as part of the 2020 budget. This funding was eliminated in the 2021 budget. Together with its coalition partners, JFREJ organizes community safety canvasses and bystander intervention training sessions in response to incidents of antisemitism.

=== Jews for Black Lives ===
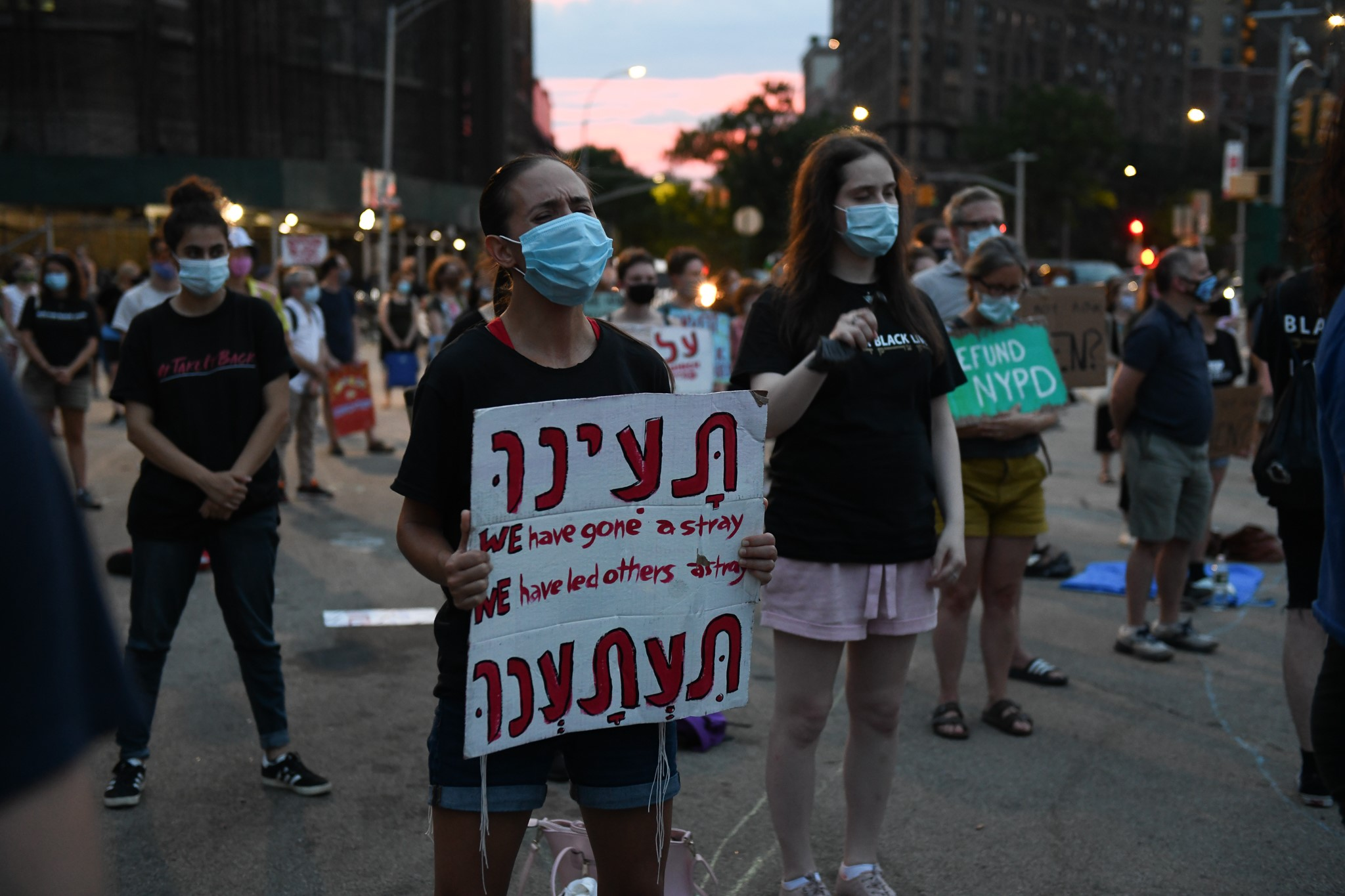
JFREJ members at a Black Lives Matter protest in Brooklyn, July 2020.

In 2014, JFREJ participated in Black Lives Matter protests in New York City following the killing of Eric Garner.

In 2016, JFREJ organized a month-long #JewsForBlackLives campaign, culminating in a march of 400 participants, which was the largest Jewish mobilization for Black Lives Matter at the time.

In 2018, members of JFREJ's Jews of Color caucus organized a Juneteenth Seder, using traditions from the Passover Seder. The event highlighted demands for justice for Black New Yorkers killed by the NYPD and called for reparations.

In 2020, after the murder of George Floyd, JFREJ participated in the ensuing protests in New York City, joined advocacy efforts to defund the New York Police Department, and organized a Shabbat service at the Occupy City Hall encampment.

== Notable members ==
- Abby Stein
- Adrienne Cooper
- Alisa Solomon
- Brad Lander
- Ilana Glazer
- Jennifer Hirsch
- Judith Plaskow
- Julia Salazar
- Melanie Kaye/Kantrowitz
- Simone Zimmerman

== See also ==
- Jewish left
