= Stosh Cotler =

American Jewish activist

- Born: 1968 (age 57–58)
- Employer: Bend the Arc
- Known for: Jewish activism

Staci "Stosh" Cotler (born 1968) is an American activist. She was Chief Executive Officer of Bend the Arc, a progressive Jewish political organization that blends advocacy, community organizing, and leadership training.

== Biography ==
Born in Olympia, Washington, Cotler became involved with advocacy work while living in Portland, Oregon. In Portland, she founded an organization which offered self defense, violence prevention and empowerment training for girls and women. She was also involved with advocating for Palestinian rights and protested Israel's treatment of Palestinians during the Second Intifada.

In 2005 she began working for Jewish Funds for Justice in New York, which merged with the Progressive Jewish Alliance in 2011.

Cotler became Bend the Arc's Executive vice president in 2011 and CEO in 2014. When Cotler became CEO, The Forward noted that she was "one of the few women leading a national Jewish group of its size."

In 2014, The Forward named her one of its 14 Jewish Women To Watch. In 2015, she was named one of the “15 progressive faith leaders to watch” by the Center for American Progress.

In 2017 she became a Senior Fellow at Auburn Seminary.

In 2022, Cotler transitioned out of the CEO role at Bend the Arc and became Senior Advisor to the organization.

Cotler has often been quoted by the media regarding immigration, in response to violent attacks on Jews and regarding issues of racial justice. Geoffrey Claussen describes Cotler as contributing to musar literature, citing her writing about courage.

Cotler is queer. She has a black belt in kung fu.
