= Treyf (podcast) =

Canadian left-wing Jewish podcast

- Genre: Political podcast; Judaism; Anarchism
- Language: English

Cast and voices
- Hosted by: David Zinman and Sam Bick

Publication
- No. of episodes: 95
- Original release: July 21, 2015 – February 23, 2021
- Provider: CKUT-FM

Related
- Website: www.treyfpodcast.com

Treyf (Yiddish: טרייף) is a politically left-wing Jewish podcast hosted by Sam Bick and David Zinman. According to their website, "Treyf is an anarchist Jewish podcast recorded in occupied Tio'tia:ke (Montreal). The show features discussions about politics and history from a leftist Jewish perspective."

== Background ==
The title of the podcast, Treyf, is a Yiddish word that means "not kosher". The show's original tagline, "A Debatably Jewish Podcast," was a tongue-in-cheek reference to the fact that many right-wing Jews would not consider them or their politics to be authentically Jewish. According to the Canadian Jewish News, each episode receives thousands of listens.

While the hosts are critical of right-wing Jewish politics and institutions, they are proud of their Jewish heritage. Both hosts attended Jewish schools, enjoy the Yiddish language, and are well-versed in Jewish history and religion.

Treyf announced a hiatus in June 2022.

== Politics ==
The hosts are both secular Jews and the podcast takes a materialist view of Jewish life and history. The hosts consider themselves to be Anti-Zionists, a political position they connect to groups such as the Jewish Labour Bund and the Yiddish anarchist movement. Bick and Zinman have stated that one of their goals in starting the show was to "bring anti-racist & anti-colonial leftist perspectives to the political discussions happening in North American Jewish communities."

== Format ==
During the first year of the show, Treyf episodes were structured around media criticism and short interviews about topical issues. The podcast changed format in its second year, focusing on the emergence of a new generation of Jewish leftist activity in the US & Canada by profiling groups, projects, writers, and activists that were becoming more active during that time. By 2018, the format changed again toward episodes with multiple interviews on a specific topic, as well as multiple-episode series exploring a single theme.

Most episodes of Treyf feature a segment called Shkoyakh, during which each host offers an endorsement ('shkoyakh') or condemnation ('anti-shkoyakh') to someone or something they believe deserves it. David Weinfeld, professor of Jewish Studies at Rowan University, has described the tone of the Treyf podcast as "deeply engaging social justice-oriented vaudeville-inflected edutainment."

== Reception ==
Treyf was voted one of the 10 best podcasts in Cult MTL's annual 'Best of Montreal' polls for 2017, 2018, and 2019. The show was listed as one of the top ten Jewish podcasts in Moment Magazine's 2016 reader poll, included on My Jewish Learning's 2017 list of 'How to Learn More About Judaism Online'.

A 2017 Torontoist article described Treyf as part of an increase in "Jewish progressive activism, as well as Jewish anti-fascism." The podcast was described as "leftist media by and for young Jews" and part of "the new Jewish Left" in a 2019 Briarpatch article. A 2019 article in the Canadian Jewish News stated that "While it’s sometimes said that the voice of dissent needs to be shrill to be heard, Zinman and Bick’s banter is positively charming" and that "their shows are well-researched and full of fascinating historical tidbits and astute analysis." A 2019 Forward article included Treyf as part of a "trend toward greater intellectualism" in Jewish media.

According to Jesse Brown, Treyf "fills in a hole, to represent things that are not being represented by the Canadian Jewish News and elsewhere." A 2017 Canadaland article describes the podcast as "unapologetically leftist, loudly Jewish, and completely unashamed to demand more diverse and critical community conversations. Online, audio-based, user-supported, young, and progressive, Treyf is totally different from the media that the Canadian Jewish community is used to."
