= Lois Roisman =

American poet

Lois Roisman (March 29, 1938 – June 2, 2008) was an American philanthropist, playwright and poet.

== Background ==
Lois Levin was a native of Fayetteville, Texas, and a graduate of the University of Oklahoma. Following her marriage to Arnold Fagin, with whom she had three children (Barry Fagin, Dan Fagin and Lisa Fagin Davis), she spent much of her early life in Oklahoma City, where she was a medical editor, ran a charitable group and helped start a summer arts program for grade-school students. Following her divorce in 1976 she married Anthony Roisman and relocated to Washington, DC in 1980.

== Career ==
Roisman was the first executive director of the Jewish Funds for Justice, the first national Jewish grant-making organization focused on supporting non-Jewish causes in the United States. Roisman was previously executive director of the Oklahoma City Community Foundation. Roisman spent over 20 years in the field of philanthropy. The American Jewish Committee in 1986 reported that Roisman believed that "political and religious developments were causing Jews to reassess their position in American life. "The Moral Majority's call for the Christianization of America underlines the importance of a more active Jewish participation in efforts to create a just society", she said.

Initial grants made by the fund were to Navajos in Arizona, homeless African-Americans in Boston, and low-income Mexican-Americans in Colorado." The group was also an early funder of a young community organizer in Chicago named Barack Obama.

While living in Washington, D.C., Roisman and others founded the charity, Silent Partners to give assistance, albeit anonymously, to the Neval Thomas Elementary School in the struggling Anacostia section.

According to Roisman's June 13, 2008 obituary in The Washington Post, Silent Partners purchased supplies and provided unrestricted funds to use throughout the school year to pay for field trips and other activities. In 1993 she was quoted in the Washingtonian magazine that the "silent" aspect also taught a lesson to the children of the more-affluent donors, that "the highest form of philanthropy is anonymous".

== Death ==
Roisman later moved to Lyme, New Hampshire, with her second husband, the environmental attorney Anthony Roisman, where she concentrated on writing plays and poetry. She died in Lyme, New Hampshire from congestive heart disease in 2008, aged 70.

== Plays ==
Her seven plays included Nobody's Gilgul, a comedy about a female lawyer and an angel from the shtetl or poor Jewish community. It was performed at community theaters nationally and won the Outstanding New Play award at the 1993 Source Theater Festival in the District of Columbia. This was later memorialized in her anthology, Making A Scene: The Contemporary Drama of Jewish Women and another drama, The Linden Tree, earned Roisman the 2001 Vermont Playwrights Award.

== Poetry ==
Her poetry was frequently published in journals, including the Litchfield Review and Light Quarterly, and she won the 2005 Petra Kenney poetry competition in the category of comic verse. Her first book of poetry, published posthumously, was The Verse Within: Conversing with Hasidic Tales.
