= Jewish conservatism =

Political and social conservatism rooted in Judaism

Jewish conservatism is political and social conservatism rooted in, or inspired by, Judaism, and specifically Jewish concerns.

In a 2015 essay for Mosaic, Eric Cohen identified three planks of Jewish conservatism: Jewish ideas about traditional family, hawkish foreign policy, and economic liberalism.

Neoconservatism is an American political movement that formed in opposition to the New Left. Many American Jewish conservatives either identify personally or have been categorized as Neoconservative; though the term in general post-Bush administration has taken on a negative connotation (Neocon or Neo-Con is usually derogatory, and synonymous of being a warmonger) and will nowadays find few American conservatives actually espousing to be Neoconservative. Many Neoconservatives were Jewish liberals displeased with leftist anti-Zionism.

Some Jewish conservatives in the west, especially those in the United States, ally themselves with conservative Christians, under the perception of shared "Judeo-Christian values".

Prominent Jewish conservative publications in the United States include Jewish News Syndicate, The Jewish Press, The Jewish Voice, Jewish World Review, Mosaic, Tablet, Commentary and The Algemeiner.

== See also ==
- Conservatism in Israel
- Judaism and politics
- American Jews in politics
- Jewish left
- Jewish fundamentalism
