= George Floyd protests in Nebraska =

2020 civil unrest after the murder of George Floyd

- Part of George Floyd protests
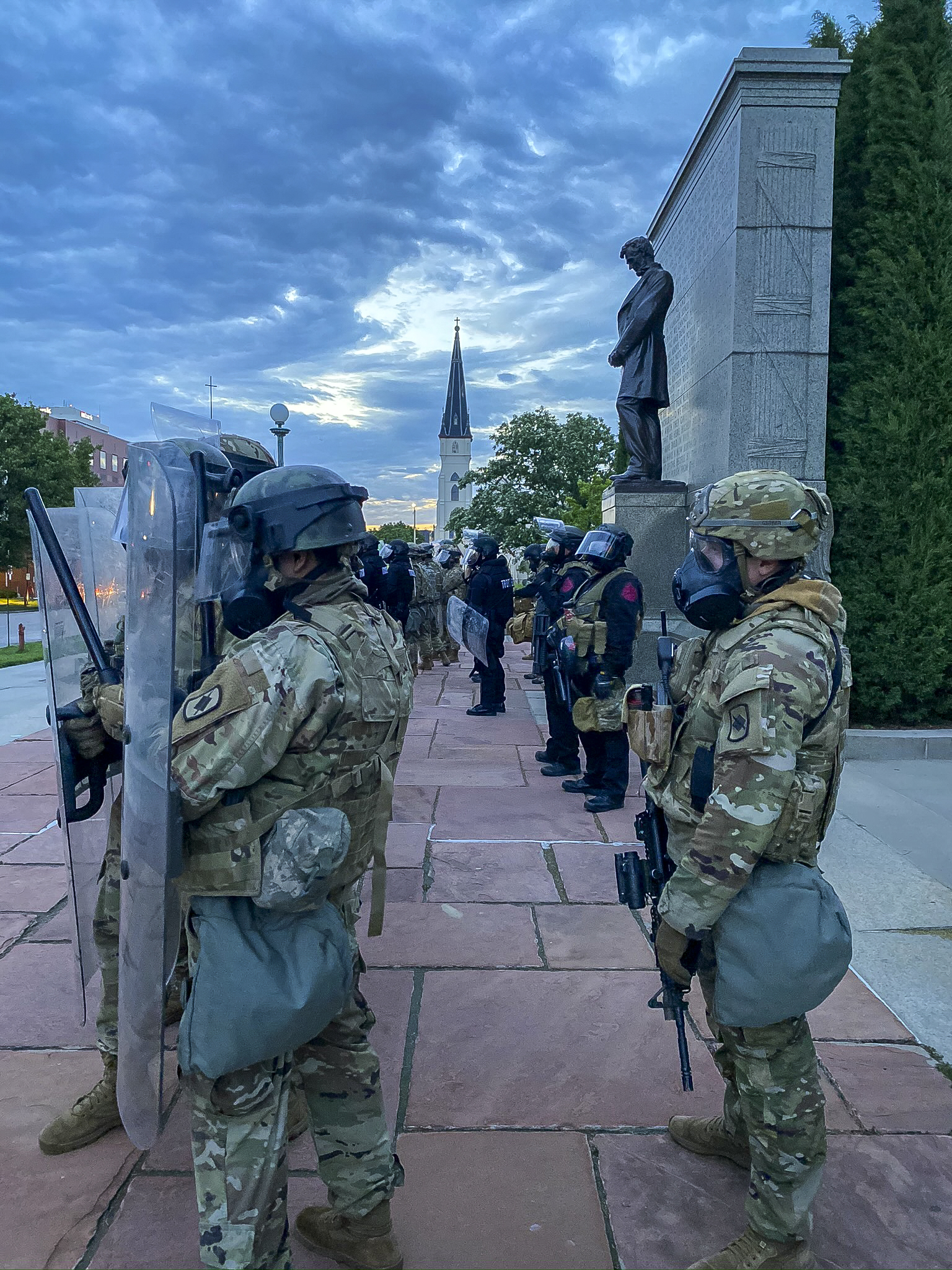
- Nebraska National Guard and state troopers at the Nebraska State Capitol in Lincoln on May 31
- Date: May 29 – November 23, 2020 (5 months, 3 weeks and 5 days)
- Location: Nebraska, United States
- Caused by: Reactions to the Murder of George Floyd and the Shooting of James Scurlock; Police brutality; Institutional racism against African Americans; Economic, racial and social inequality

This is a list of protests and unrests in the US state of Nebraska related to the murder of George Floyd on May 25, 2020.

== Locations ==
=== Alliance ===
On June 9, 2020, roughly 40 people attended a Black Lives Matter protest in downtown Alliance. Many more residents of Alliance honked their cars in approval. The protesters held various signs in support of George Floyd, James Scurlock, and against police brutality more generally. The demonstrations are ongoing.

=== Ashland ===
On June 13, 2020, more than 40 people marched from Sabre Heights neighborhood, on the west edge of Ashland, to the downtown. A rally was held on Silver Street, which was barricaded with permission from city government. One speaker told of her experiences with racism as a Chinese teenager in Ashland. Another discussed the power of voting in local elections.

=== Bellevue ===
On May 31, a peaceful protest took place along the corner of N-370 and Galvin Road in Bellevue. Police officers joined the protesters arm in arm, with a Bellevue Police Department sergeant speaking out against corrupt officers.

=== Chadron ===
In the northwest Nebraska town of Chadron, dozens of students and others voiced their solidarity with the Black Lives Matter movement. The protesters carried signs and held a lie-in on June 3, 2020. Around 200 people were in attendance.

=== Columbus ===
On June 2, 150 people gathered at 23rd Street and 33rd Avenue in Columbus to hold signs and chat to passing traffic. Organizer Ashley Rodriguez told the Columbus Telegram that her goal was to help people of color in Columbus, saying "I want to protect them as much as I can. I love everyone, but as of right now, Black lives matter." She was inspired by the protests she witnessed in Omaha and Lincoln, and her heartbreak over the murder of George Floyd. Locals donated pizza to protesters.

=== Grand Island ===
A group estimated at 300 people marched towards Pioneer Park in the center of Grand Island, on June 1, 2020. Officials said that people in a passing car sprayed protesters with "a foul-smelling liquid that might have been urine."

=== Harvard ===
An estimated 50 people, many of them students, and some young families, gathered June 2, 2020, in the center of Harvard, to protest the murder of George Floyd and to call attention to the work that needs to be done in their own community.

=== Hastings ===
On Juneteenth, dozens came to Highland Park in Hastings to show support for Black Lives Matter. Speakers of color explained the history of the holiday, expressed a desire for more Black history to be taught in public schools, and related experiences of racism in central Nebraska. Demonstrators then marched along 14th Street to Burlington Avenue. Participants were asked to wear masks and not include profanity on signs.

=== Kearney ===
On Saturday, May 30, people gathered near downtown Kearney to protest the murder of George Floyd. The peaceful protesting continued with over 100 participants on Sunday, May 31, when protesters gathered at the Museum of Nebraska Art, marched to the main intersection of the town, and back. The May 31 protests included recognition of Omaha resident, James Scurlock, who was murdered at a protest in Omaha the previous night. Small groups of protesters continued to gather throughout the first week of June. Protests were ongoing as of June 8, when 75 people demonstrated downtown in the afternoon.

=== Lincoln ===
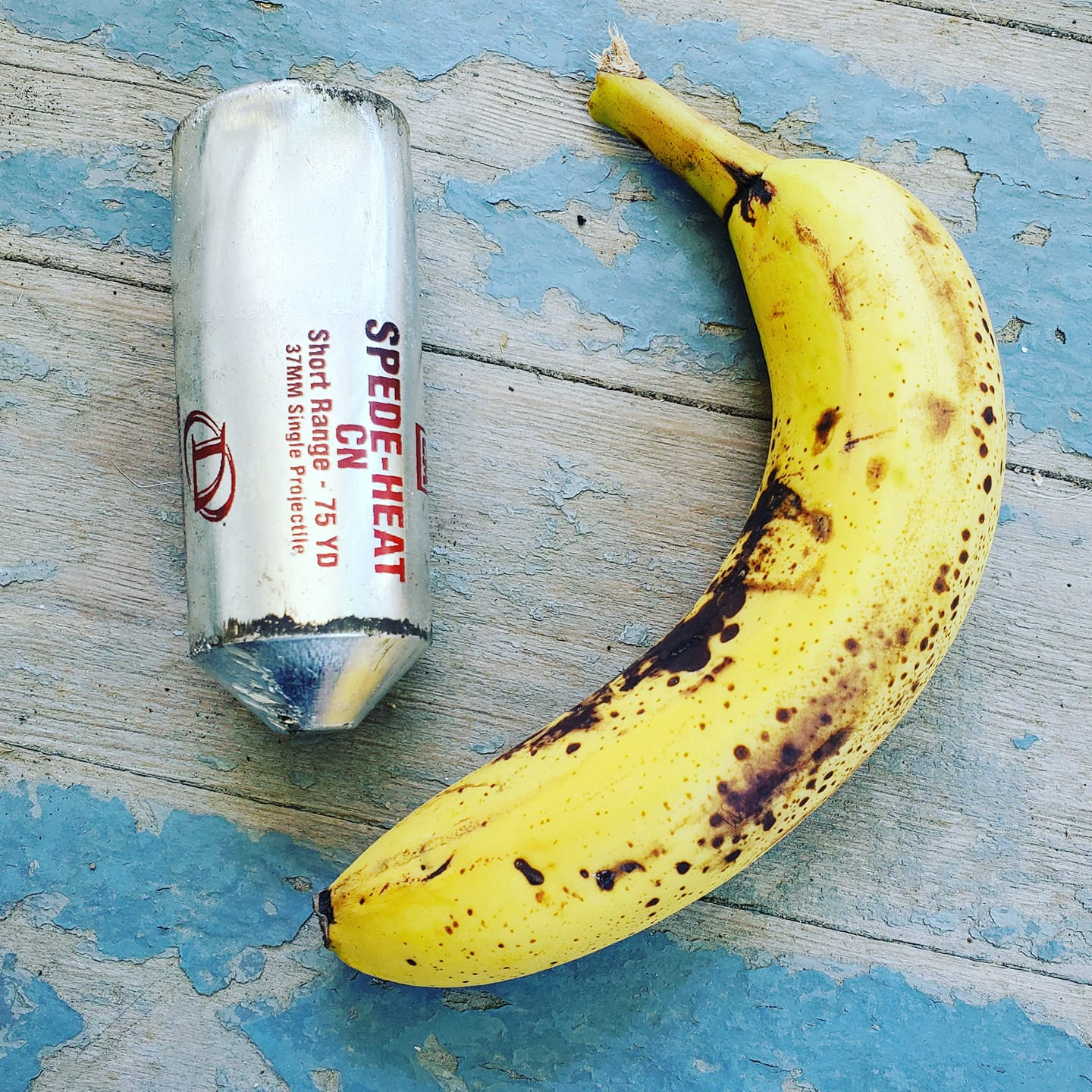
A tear gas canister fired by police at protesters, found the morning of June 1 on O Street in Lincoln. A banana has been included for scale.

On the morning of Friday, May 29, people gathered at the State Capitol to protest. In the early morning hours of May 30, people gathered at around 27th and O Streets to protest. Later the protest migrated to the EZ GO gas station on 25th and O St. Protesters and police officers stood on each side of the gas station parking lot as multiple protesters yelled at the police while others broke into and vandalized businesses in the area. After throwing water bottles, rocks and fireworks at the officers they decided to finally approach the protesters and detain as many as possible. Eight police officers were injured with one requiring advanced medical treatment, Tear gas and rubber bullets were used, and several arrests were made.

May 30, march on O St

- Around 8 pm on May 30, 2020, another protest started forming at the state capitol. While this protest was similar to the night before the protesters kept walking past the EZ GO gas station. Around an estimated 5 to 600 people walked up O St carrying signs and flags while chanting "hands up, Don't shoot". While police originally tried to block protesters from continuing past the intersection of 48th and O St. they decided it would be best not to do so as the protest was considered peaceful and not a threat. The march continued until the group reached north 56th St. That's when the group split in half. Half of them went down 56th St towards Target while the other half continued down O St until the group reached near Eastmont towers before dispersing. Meanwhile, the other group reached R St where a police car sat in the intersection. Multiple people tried to damage it and even move it before dispersing.
- Police attacked a May 30 protest in front of the County-City Building. A teenaged protester named Leo Celis was intentionally shot in the face by police while he was kneeling with his arms linked with other protesters. A projectile tore through Celis' right cheek, breaking bones in the face and blinding Celis in his right eye. Medics providing aid to Celis and others were also shot by police.

On May 31, After protesters broke curfew police activated their full field force team for the first time since 2004. The field force team attacked protesters at intersection of 12th and H streets with tear gas, rubber bullets, and riot shields. Police shot protesters and medics in the head and face, including a teenage volunteer medic named Elise Poole who was shot in the face with a rubber bullet while attempting to aid a protester incapacitated by tear gas. Doctors later told Poole her nose bones resembled "broken eggshells." Lincoln Journal-Star reporter Chris Dunker was tackled and detained by police while live-streaming. The reporter captured video of protesters extinguishing fires that hot police tear gas canisters had started in bushes near the Capitol Building.

On June 11, an estimated 600 people met near SouthPointe Pavilions, a shopping mall, to march on South 27th Street and though residential subdivisions. This was the first march in south Lincoln. People watched from their front lawns; some joined the march. Marchers carried a large banner reading "reparations" at the front of the march.

In early July, residences with Black Lives Matter yard signs found handwritten notes taped to the signs. The notes opposed Black Lives Matter and claimed the movement wanted to kill police. In response, one couple delivered letters to their neighbors offering dialogue about their sign. Another household posted the note in a Country Club neighborhood online discussion group, where it promoted a July 9 anti-racist march through the Country Club neighborhood.

On August 3, activists testified at a city council meeting against a police budget increase proposed by mayor Leirion Gaylor Baird. The meeting stretched late into the night because so many testified. Outside the building, activists chanted and banged drums. Local groups Jews Against White Nationalism and the Black Leaders Movement attended.

In November a woman who was among the crowd attacked by police in May, Dominique Liu-Sang, announced she would run for Lincoln's city council.

=== Norfolk ===
About 300 people gathered peacefully in Norfolk on the weekend following the murder of George Floyd. Dozens gathered again on 13th and Norfolk Avenue on June 3, 2020, to show solidarity for the Black Lives Matter movement and to protest the murder of George Floyd and the fatal shooting of James Scurlock in Omaha.

=== North Platte ===
An estimated 500 people gathered on the afternoon of June 7 at a church on the outskirts of North Platte. Demonstrators traveled the city streets, calling their march a "peace walk". A local printer made 50 anti-racist signs to hand out to protesters; others carried homemade signs.

=== Oakland ===
About 50 protesters gathered in the city park of Oakland, Nebraska on June 9, 2020, to draw attention to the problem of continued racism in the United States. The protest was organized by a young woman from the nearby town of Craig.

=== Omaha ===
==== Following the murder of George Floyd ====
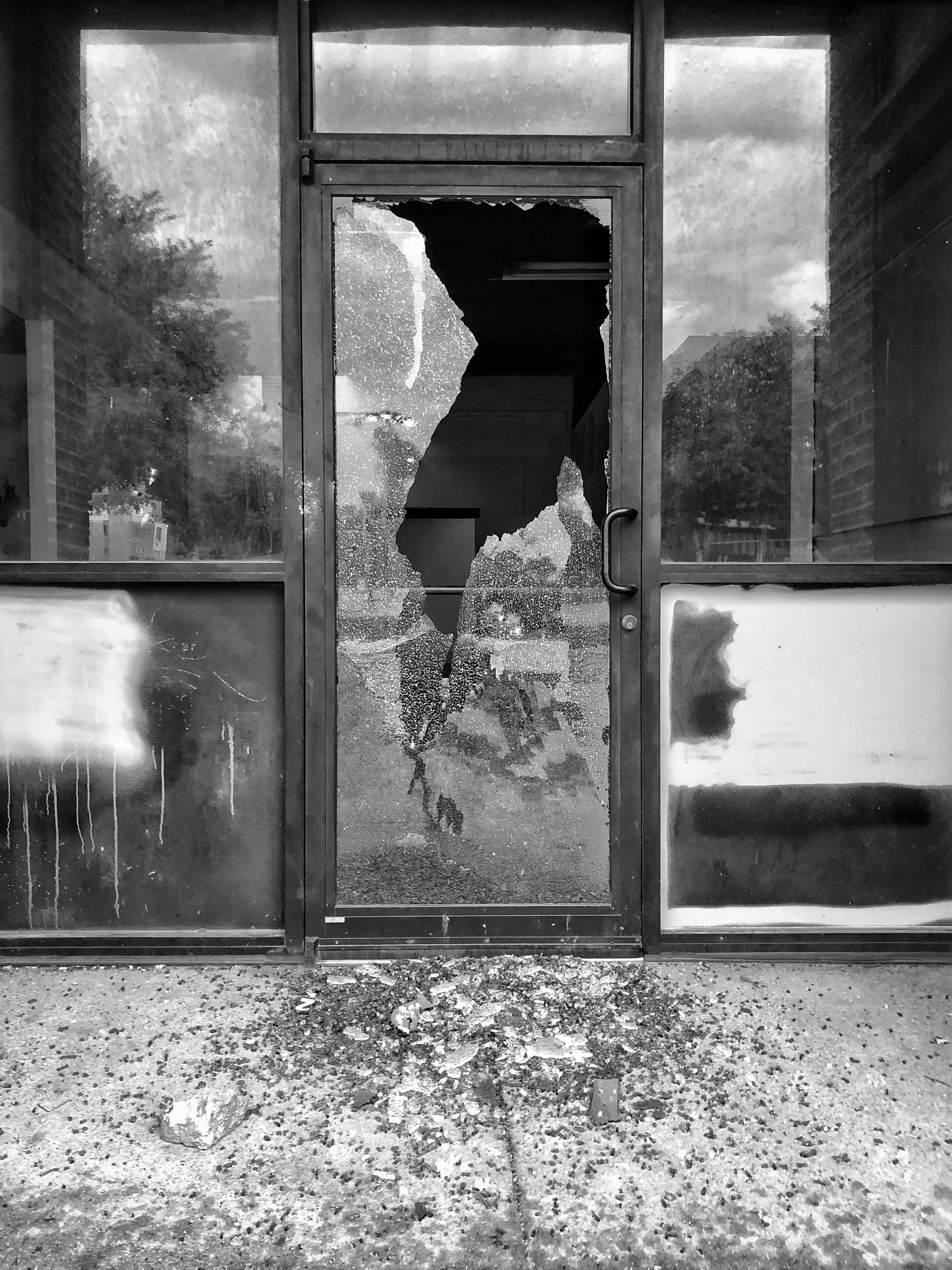
Broken windows of a shop in Omaha, Nebraska

Thousands of people protested on Friday, May 29 outside Crossroads Mall in West Omaha. Protests were peaceful until Omaha Police fired tear gas at protesters at 8:00pm. Deputy Chief Ken Kanger stated that protesters were still peaceful as of 9:45 p.m A small number of people broke the law, and 18 arrests were made due to failure to disperse. Police confined protesters in a parking lot and fired pepper balls at them because they were yelling. The protesters relocated downtown and quickly became a riot, damaging several buildings throughout the night. Some protesters threw objects such as shoes and water bottles at police. At one point protesters surrounded a police vehicle. Two officers were injured during the riots. Tear gas and pepper balls were used.

A man named Adam Keup traveled from Council Bluffs with his husband on May 29 to take photographs of the Crossroads protest. The couple did not bring signs or yell, but worked to document the events at a distance. Within 15 minutes of arrival they were shot without warning by police with pepper balls fired from a paintball gun. One projectile struck Keup in the eye. Targeting the head is a violation of the Omaha Police Department policies and procedures manual. Keup became permanently blind in his right eye as a result of being shot by police.

A police officer named Grant Gentile fired a pepper ball gun at a protester's genital area and bragged about it to other officers. He was later recommended for termination by the police chief.

==== Following the killing of James Scurlock ====
Around midnight on Saturday, May 30, Jacob Gardner, a white bar owner in the Old Market, pointed a gun at protesters and killed James Scurlock, a 22-year-old African American, after Scurlock attempted to tackle Gardner. The Douglas County Attorney's Office declined to press charges against Gardner. County Attorney Don Kleine called the shooting of James Scurlock "senseless, but justified." Outrage about the shooting and the lack of criminal charges was covered by the press nationwide.

On Sunday, Mayor Jean Stothert issued a strict city-wide curfew from 8:00 PM to 6:00 AM through June 3. On Monday, June 1, demonstrations began peacefully in downtown Omaha. Police began arresting people on charges of breaking curfew, including KMTV journalist, Jon Kipper, and two women as they were walking to their car.

June 5 was the third anniversary of the killing by police of Zachary Bear Heels, a member of the Rosebud Lakota Tribe. Hundreds retraced Bear Heels' final steps, a 4-mile walk from the Greyhound bus station to 60th and Center Streets, where a rally was held denouncing police violence.

On July 11, in response to ongoing Black Lives Matter protests, a "Back the Blue" counterprotest was held in Memorial Park. Police officers and their supporters attended, including a contingent of Proud Boys, a far-right extremist group. Some Black Lives Matter protesters also attended to show their objection to the rally.

On July 19, an estimated 125 protesters gathered outside Omaha Police Headquarters for a "Bloody Sunday" protest objecting to the adverse effects of tear gas on menstruation and pregnancy. Police on horseback and in riot gear were present. Protesters went on a march that included visiting the site of the murder of James Scurlock.

On July 25, people in Omaha protested in support of ongoing George Floyd protests in Portland, Oregon. Police arrested approximately 120 protesters near 28th and Farnam Streets. Protesters committed no violence or vandalism. Police kettled protesters on a bridge, preventing the crowd from dispersing, yet arrested people for failure to disperse. Others would be "arrested on suspicion of resisting arrest" according to a journalist. Police fired pepper balls into the trapped crowd. Among the people detained were a legal observer, medics, and media, including journalist Jazari Kual, who described the protesters as trapped by police on a bridge with nowhere to go while the police fired pepper balls. Protesters were held in a crowded jail cells without knowing when they would be released. Protesters remained in jail for up to a day with limited water and bathroom access.

On the morning of August 1, 40 people wrote messages such as "defund the police" on the sidewalks around Omaha Police Department headquarters with sidewalk chalk. In the afternoon, protesters marched in West Omaha with more than 50 signs, each naming one person killed by police in Omaha.

==== Following the killing of Kenneth Jones ====
From November 20 to 22, the organization ProBLAC staged demonstrations outside of Omaha police headquarters. They protested the police shooting of Kenneth Jones, a Black man killed during a traffic stop on the night of November 19. Protesters contrasted the situation of Roberto Silva Jr., a man who recently committed a mass shooting in Bellevue and was arrested without incident, with Jones, who was shot without having committed act of violence. Protesters demanded to see the body camera footage of Kenneth Jones's killing. Police fired tear gas at the protesters, and struck some, who were sent to the hospital. Pro-police counter-protesters were taken to safety inside the police station by the police, then police fired pepper balls on the BLM protesters who remained outside.

=== Scottsbluff ===
On May 31, dozens of protesters marched from Guadalupe Center through the streets of downtown Scottsbluff to protest George Floyd's murder. A candlelight vigil was also held in Centennial Park.

=== Wayne ===
About 300 people demonstrated in Wayne on the evening of June 5, beginning with a prayer, speakers, and a moment of silence at Bressler Park. Demonstrators walked the streets of Wayne for about an hour, chanting "Black Lives Matter" and "I can't breathe." The event was attended by many students at Wayne State College, including Black international students. A few other protests and vigils were held on days before and following. Event organizer Alana Aguirre said that taking a stand against systemic racism is important for everybody, no matter their race.

=== York ===
Approximately 20 people gathered on June 1 outside the York County courthouse to express opposition to racism. One demonstrator told the York News-Times she felt that deployment of the Nebraska National Guard in Lincoln and Omaha was a mistake because it would lead to more fear. Another remarked that "the people here protesting care more about others' lives than the people in church do."

== See also ==
- Civil rights movement in Omaha, Nebraska
- List of George Floyd protests in the United States
- List of George Floyd protests outside the United States
- Racial tension in Omaha, Nebraska
- Timeline of racial tension in Omaha, Nebraska
