= Broit un ehre =

Defunct Labour Zionist newspaper

- Type: biweekly newspaper
- Founded: 1909
- Ceased publication: 1910
- Political alignment: Labour Zionist
- Language: Yiddish
- Country: Argentina

Broit un ehre (Yiddish: ברויט און עהרע, "Bread and Honour") was a Yiddish-language Labour Zionist biweekly newspaper published in Argentina from 1909 to 1910. It was launched towards the end of 1909. Broit un ehre was published by the local Poale Zion nucleus, which had been founded in 1907. Pinie Katz served as the editor of Broit un ehre, and León Jazanovich as its director. Jazanovich was a well-known Poale Zion leader, who had arrived in Argentina in July 1909.

Only seven issues of Broit un ehre were published, but the publication was noted for being one of the most prestigious of the Poale Zion movement.
