= Jill Jacobs (rabbi) =

American rabbi (born 1975)

- Born: 1975 (age 50–51); Boston, Massachusetts, U.S.
- Education: Columbia University; Hunter College; Jewish Theological Seminary of America
- Occupation: Rabbi
- Spouse: Guy Austrian (m. 2007)

Jill Jacobs (born 1975) is an American Conservative rabbi who serves as the executive director of T'ruah: The Rabbinic Call for Human Rights, formerly Rabbis for Human Rights-North America. She is the author of Where Justice Dwells: A Hands-On Guide to Doing Social Justice in Your Jewish Community and There Shall be No Needy: Pursuing Social Justice through Jewish Law and Tradition. This book includes chapters on tzedakah, poverty, health care, housing, labor, criminal justice, and environmental justice in America, seen through a Jewish viewpoint. She has served as the Rabbi in Residence of Jewish Funds for Justice and as the Director of Outreach and Education for Jewish Council on Urban Affairs.

Jacobs is also the author of a teshuvah (legal position), passed by the Rabbinical Assembly's Committee on Jewish Law and Standards that says that Jews should pay their workers a living wage, create dignified workplaces, and hire union workers when possible. She was named to Newsweek's list of the fifty most influential rabbis in 2009 and 2010; to The Forward newspaper's list of fifty influential American Jews in 2006, 2008, and 2011; and to The Jewish Week's list of "thirty-six under thirty-six" in 2008. She was also named to Newsweek's list of the 50 Most Influential Rabbis in America in 2009, 2010, 2011, and 2012, and to the Jerusalem Post’s 2013 list of “Women to Watch.” She has written many articles on issues relating to Judaism and social justice. She has covered topics including Jewish social justice, education, and tzedakah. She is a former columnist for The Forward.

A contributor to The Washington Post, Jacobs has written on antisemitism, the Donald Trump administration’s equation of antisemitism with disagreements toward the Israeli government and the funneling of American tax dollars to Israeli "extremist" groups.

In 2014, Jacobs was arrested with Rabbis Sharon Kleinbaum and Shai Held, along with Randi Weingarten, the president of the American Federation of Teachers, for blocking traffic to protest a grand jury’s decision not to indict the New York police officer who choked Staten Island resident Eric Garner to death.

== Early life ==
Jacobs grew up in Framingham, Massachusetts, where she attended Framingham public schools. She was ordained by the Jewish Theological Seminary of America in 2003 and also earned an MA in Talmud at the same time. She earned an MS in Urban Affairs from Hunter College, CUNY, in 2003, and a BA in Comparative Literature from Columbia University in 1997. She is married to Rabbi Guy Austrian and has two daughters. She spent the 2009–2010 academic year as a Jerusalem Fellow at Hebrew University of Jerusalem's Mandel Institute.

== Approach to Judaism and social justice ==
Jacobs's approach to Judaism and social justice is driven by a belief that Jews should be involved in the public square as Jews. In There Shall be No Needy she writes:

When Jews engage in the public discourse as Jews, we should bring Jewish law and principles into the conversation in such a way as to enrich, rather than shut down, the discourse. We should also bring into this dialogue Jews and others who are engaged in public life; the conversation among rabbis, public policy experts, grassroots activists, and Jewish communal professionals should generate a nuanced understanding of how the Jewish community might approach individual issues.

This approach precludes quoting a simplified version of Jewish law or text in order to prove a point, or asserting that Jewish law unequivocally demands a certain approach to an issue. Rather, Jewish sources should help us to see various sides of an issue, challenge our assumptions, and help us to formulate a response that takes multiple factors into account. The commitment to living our Judaism publicly should then push us to take public action on these principles, both as individuals and as a community. If we succeed in facilitating this rich conversation, she says, we will create a new kind of Jewish politics in America. Rather than trade sound bites, we will continue the talmudic tradition of dialogue, in which various questioners and commentary engage in an often messy conversation that eventually leads to a fuller understanding of the situation at hand. Jews who now exercise their commitments to public life outside of the Jewish community, she says, will find a place within this community, as they contribute their own wisdom and observations to the conversation. ... We will witness the emergence of a Judaism that views ritual observance, study, and engagement in the world as an integrated whole, rather than as separate and distinct practices. The Jewish community’s deepened involvement in public life will change the face of religious politics in America, as other communities will recognize the Jewish community as an important and authentic religious voice in the public square of America.

She claims individual Jews and Jewish institutions will strengthen their commitment to public life, as the question of how to address current issues becomes part of the general Jewish conversation, rather than something separate from it or as an add-on to discussion of Shabbat, kashrut, and other aspects of Jewish practice. Throughout her work, Jacobs integrates Jewish legal and narrative text, social science research, and stories of people she has met and with whom she has worked.

Jacobs frequently called out the Trump administration for what she saw as its disregard for democracy and human rights at home and abroad: “Now is the time for principled opposition, not accommodation.”

During Trump’s campaign for 2020 reelection, Jacobs opposed many of the president's actions, saying his campaign trafficked in anti-Semitism alongside racism, xenophobia, misogyny, homophobia, ableism and Islamophobia.

== Approach to Israeli-Palestinian relationship ==
Jacobs believes a more positive and productive relationship between American Jews and Israel will depend on ending the occupation, legislating the equality of all Israeli citizens, and committing to democracy. She has said that “non-political programming” is for political show and that policy change is needed.

Jacobs does not personally support the BDS (Boycott, Divestment, Sanctions) movement, but has criticized legislation to stifle boycotts against Israel and Israeli settlements. Jacobs has said these laws violate the First Amendment and open the door to broader government control of public discourse. In 2003, Jacobs, then a rabbinical student at the Jewish Theological Seminary, got into a public debate with Rabbi Daniel Gordis. She wrote an article for the JTS student bulletin in which she critiqued Israel's policies toward Arab neighborhoods in East Jerusalem. The JTS administration censored the article, and David Freidenreich, the student editor of the bulletin, quit in protest. Jacobs and Freidenreich distributed around the school a copy of the censored article along with Freidenreich's letter of resignation. Gordis heard about the article and sent an e-mail excoriating Jacobs to his list of several thousand correspondents. Jacobs responded with a public plea for civil dialogue. Gordis sent a follow-up e-mail apologizing for any personal embarrassment he caused, without retracting any of his earlier comments.

== Bibliography ==
- American Jews, Stop Funding Jewish Terrorism Haaretz, May 2, 2021
- Trump still appears to believe all Jews are really Israelis Washington Post, Dec. 12, 2019
- How to tell when criticism of Israel is actually anti-Semitism Washington Post, May 18, 2018
- There Shall Be No Needy: Pursuing Social Justice through Jewish Law and Tradition (Jewish Lights, 2009)
- “Bread, roses, and chutzpah: Jewish women in American social movements,” in The New Jewish Feminism, Jewish Lights, 2008
- “Health Care in Judaism,” in Jewish Choices, Jewish Voices: Social Justice, Jewish Publication Society, 2008
- “Living Wage,” in Jewish Choices, Jewish Voices: Money, Jewish Publication Society, 2008
- “From Pumbedita to Washington: Rabbinic text, urban policy and social reality,” Shofar: An Interdisciplinary Journal of Jewish Studies, Summer 2008
- "Work, Workers, and the Jewish Owner," Teshuvah passed by the Committee on Jewish Law and Standards, 2008
- “A Jewish Vision for Economic Justice,” in Righteous Indignation, Jewish Lights 2007
- “The History of Tikkun Olam” in Zeek, July 2007
- “Reclaiming Talmudic Judaism: An Aggadic Approach to Halakhah,” Conservative Judaism, Winter 2006
- “Steps toward a Jewish Urban Theology,” Tikkun, September/October 2006
- “Toward a Halakhic Definition of Poverty,” Conservative Judaism, Fall 2004
- “The defense has become the prosecution: Ezrat HaNashim, a thirteenth-century response to misogyny,” Women in Judaism, Fall 2003
- “The Living Wage: A Jewish Approach,” Conservative Judaism, Spring 2003
- “When the Rabbis Cry: Talmudic Responses to Injustice in the Biblical Text,” The Reconstructionist, Summer 2002
- “From Sukkah to Ma'akeh: The Halakhah of Housing,” Tikkun, September/October 2000
- “The Sacrifice of Shelah,” Living Text, Summer 1999
- “The Yetziah Ceremony: Rethinking the Jewish Coming of Age,” The Reconstructionist, Fall 1998 (with Mik Moore)

== See also ==
- Conservative responsa
