= Naivelt =

Naivelt cover, 1928

Naivelt (Yiddish: נייוועלט, "New World") was a Yiddish-language literary monthly magazine published in Argentina from 1927–1930. Politically, Naivelt was pro-communist but without open affiliation to the Communist Party. It was published by a group of leftist writers, also going by the name Naivelt. Hirsh Bloshtein was the editor of Naivelt. Bloshtein was deported in 1931 for communist activities.
