= Geri Donenberg =

American clinical psychologist and implementation scientist

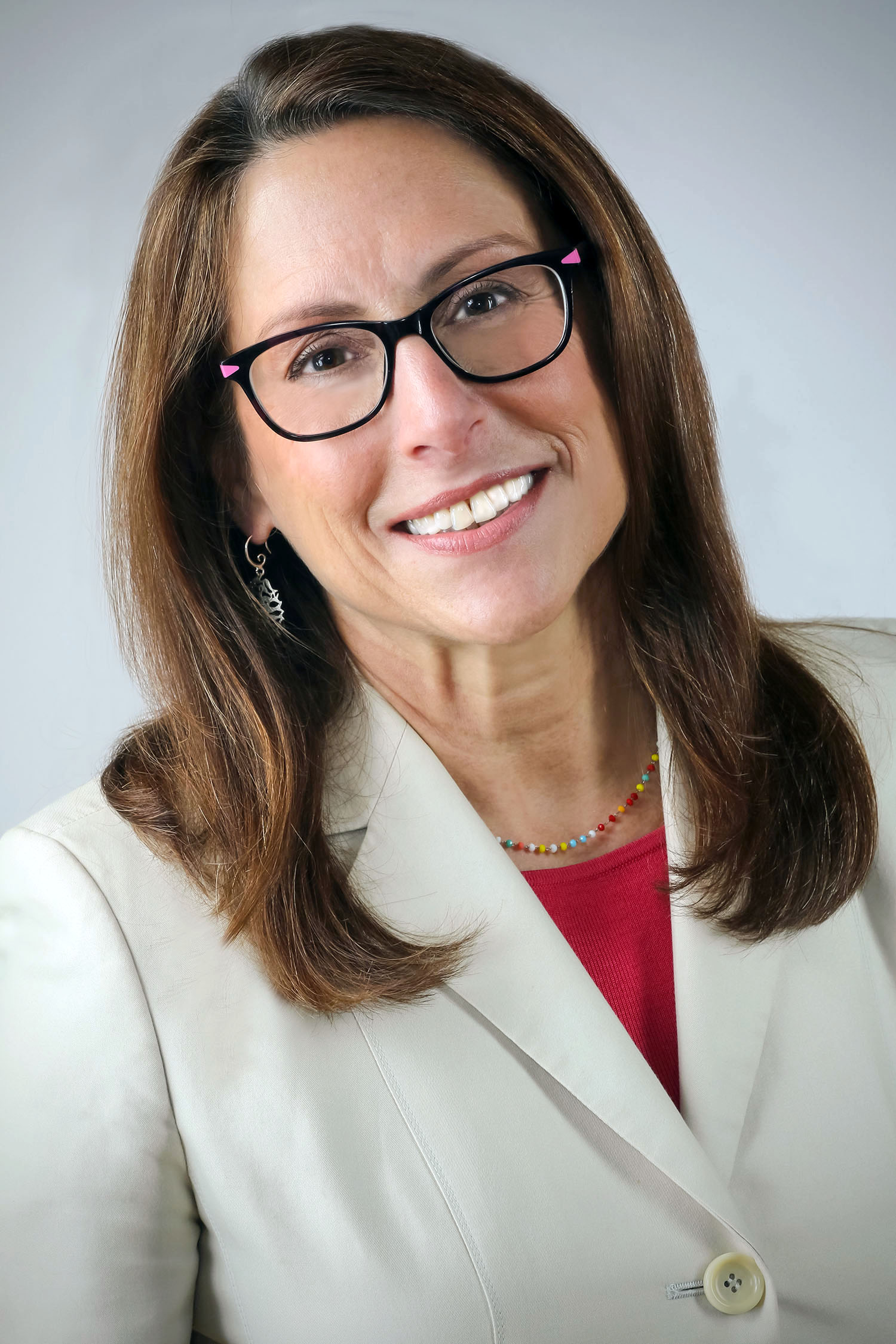
- Donenberg in 2024
- Education: University of Michigan; University of California, Los Angeles
- Scientific career
- Fields: Clinical psychology, implementation science, HIV/AIDS research
- Workplaces: Northwestern University; University of Illinois Chicago; National Institutes of Health

Geri R. Donenberg is an American clinical psychologist and implementation scientist known for her research in adolescent mental health and HIV/AIDS prevention. She is the associate director for AIDS Research at the National Institutes of Health (NIH) and director of the NIH Office of AIDS Research (OAR). Donenberg's work has focused on the intersection of mental health and HIV risk, the development of family-based interventions, and the implementation of these programs in resource-constrained communities in the United States and internationally. Prior to her role at the NIH, she was a professor at the University of Illinois Chicago (UIC).

== Education ==
Donenberg attended the University of Michigan from 1982 to 1986, earning a B.A. with high honors in psychology and political science in 1987. She also studied at Salzburg College in 1987. She pursued her graduate studies at the University of California, Los Angeles (UCLA) from 1988 to 1995, receiving a M.A. in 1990 and a Ph.D. in clinical psychology in 1995. Donenberg completed a psychology internship at the UCLA Neuropsychiatric Institute.

== Career ==
Donenberg began her academic career in 1995 as an assistant professor in the Department of Psychiatry and Behavioral Sciences at Feinberg School of Medicine. During this period, her research began to focus on the connection between mental health and HIV risk in adolescents. In 1999, she became the principal investigator on the National Institutes of Health (NIH)-funded study "HIV/AIDS Risk in Clinically Disturbed Adolescents," which explored links between psychopathology, peer relationships, and AIDS-risk behavior among youth in psychiatric care. In 1997, Donenberg became a licensed clinical psychologist in Illinois.

In 2001, Donenberg joined the University of Illinois Chicago (UIC) as an assistant professor in the Department of Psychiatry, where she founded the Healthy Youths Program (HYP) to oversee HIV/AIDS risk and prevention studies. She was promoted to associate professor in 2003 and professor in 2008. Her early work at UIC continued to establish the foundational links between adolescent mental health and HIV acquisition risk.

By the mid-2000s, Donenberg's research shifted from observational studies to developing and testing interventions. She was the principal investigator for "Therapeutic Schools: Affect Management & HIV Prevention," a multi-site randomized controlled trial testing a school-based HIV prevention program. Her work increasingly focused on family-based programs, such as "Project STYLE," a multi-site trial testing an intervention for youth in mental health treatment. From 2006 to 2007, Donenberg was a Fulbright Scholar in Cape Town, which marked an expansion of her research to international settings. This led to projects adapting and testing family-based HIV prevention programs for youth in South Africa, Rwanda, and Indonesia.

In her later years at UIC, Donenberg's focus evolved toward implementation science. She became the founding director of UIC's Center for Dissemination and Implementation Science (CDIS). Her research from this period emphasized understanding the determinants and processes that affect the adoption, feasibility, and sustainability of interventions in low-resource environments. She held several leadership positions at UIC, including associate dean of research for the School of Public Health and chair of Scholarly Activities in the Department of Medicine.

Donenberg was appointed NIH associate director for AIDS research and director of the Office of AIDS Research (OAR), with the selection announced by NIH director Monica Bertagnolli. She began her role in October 2024, succeeding Diana Finzi, who had served as acting director since December 2023. In this capacity, Donenberg is responsible for leading and coordinating the NIH's national HIV research program.
