= T'ruah =

United States-based human rights organization

T'ruah: The Rabbinic Call for Human Rights
- Founded: 2002
- Tax ID no.: 45-0464545
- Legal status: 501(c)(3) charitable organization
- Purpose: Human rights activism
- Location: New York City
- Region served: United States, Canada
- Co-Chair: Rabbi William Plevan and Rabbi Daniel G. Zemel, as of 2025
- Executive Director: Rabbi Jill Jacobs
- Revenue: $3,349,239 (2022)
- Expenses: $3,154,567 (2022)
- Employees: 27 (2022)
- Volunteers: 100 (2022)
- Website: www.truah.org
- Formerly called: Rabbis for Human Rights North America

T'ruah: The Rabbinic Call for Human Rights, often referred to as T'ruah, is a left-wing nonprofit organization of rabbis who act on the Jewish imperative to respect and protect the human rights of all people in North America, Palestine, and Israel. Approximately 2,000 American and Canadian rabbis and cantors are affiliated with T'ruah. T'ruah was founded as Rabbis for Human Rights-North America (RHR-NA) in 2002. On January 15, 2013, RHR-NA ended its formal affiliation with Rabbis for Human Rights in Israel, and was renamed T'ruah. The name T’ruah is based on one of the sounds of the shofar (ram’s horn) acting as a call to take action.

== Organization ==
T'ruah's offices are in New York City and the organization is a registered 501(c)(3) nonprofit philanthropic organization. T'ruah was named one of the nation's 50 most innovative Jewish nonprofits in Slingshot '12-'13, a resource guide for Jewish innovation.

== History ==
In 2002, inspired by the work of Rabbis for Human Rights (RHR) Israel, a group of North American rabbis organized a North American Rabbinic Committee of RHR. Just a few months later, the rabbis began to gather signatures for a letter to Prime Minister Benjamin Netanyahu in protest of the Israeli government's policy of demolition of the homes of Palestinians. More than 400 rabbis signed the "Rabbis Letter on Home Demolition", the organization's first independent initiative. With Rabbi Gerald Serotta and Rabbi Sharon Kleinbaum as founding board co-chairpersons and Rabbi Brian Walt as founding executive director, RHR-NA was launched.

Not long after the organization's founding, RHR-NA began to work on advocacy and education around human rights issues in North America. In January 2005, in response to revelations about the use of torture at Abu Ghraib, Guantanamo Bay, and in Afghanistan, RHR-NA launched Honor the Image of God: Stop Torture Now, A Jewish Campaign to End U.S.-Sponsored Torture, the organization's first full-fledged North American campaign.

Rabbi Brian Walt was the first executive director, serving from 2002 to 2009. Steven Gerber served as RHR-NA's second executive director from 2009 to 2011. Since 2011, Rabbi Jill Jacobs has been the executive director.

In a press release on January 15, 2013, RHR-NA announced that it ending its formal affiliation with its sister organization in Israel, and would subsequently go by the name T'ruah: the Rabbinic Call for Human Rights. T'ruah said in its statement that the formal and fiscal status of the two groups had confused supporters. Board member Rabbi Sid Schwarz explained that the decision to re-organize was made "by mutual agreement with our colleagues in Israel."

== Issues and campaigns ==
=== Israel and Palestinian relations ===
T'ruah works to raise awareness and advocate for human rights of both Israelis and Palestinians in Israel, the West Bank, and Gaza.

T’ruah does not affiliate with the Global Boycott, Divestment, Sanctions (BDS) movement. It does not reject outright the strategic, targeted use of boycott and divestment in justice campaigns, but here T’ruah focuses on the lack of distinction within the official BDS movement between Israel proper and the occupied Palestinian territories that points to a potential rejection of Israel’s right to exist, a right recognized by the United Nations and other international bodies. T’ruah supports the right to criticize and to challenge the policies of the State of Israel or of any other country, and are committed to working to end the occupation and to protect the human and civil rights of all of Israel’s citizens and those living under Israeli authority.

Bowing to pressure from T’ruah, the Jewish National Fund office in the United States included in its annual financial report a detailed breakdown of its investments in projects overseas starting in 2016.

=== Ending Mass Incarceration ===
T’ruah advocates for an end to police practices that result in disproportionate stops, arrests, and deaths of people of color, advocating for more reasonable sentences, organizing communities to end prolonged solitary confinement, and educating the Jewish community on the current system of mass incarceration.

In 2016, T’ruah organized California rabbis and cantors to support SB1143, which ended long-term solitary confinement for juveniles, and represented the rabbinic community in a statewide coalition.

In 2019, T’ruah organized New Jersey rabbis and cantors to work with a statewide coalition that successfully advocated to pass the Isolated Confinement Restriction Act, which bans solitary confinement lasting more than 20 days (and 30 in a 60-day period) and eliminates the practice altogether for vulnerable populations including juveniles, pregnant inmates, and the elderly.

In 2019, T’ruah supported the Humane Alternatives to Long-Term Solitary Confinement (HALT) Act (S1623/A2500), as a member of the Coalition for Alternatives to Isolated Confinement (CAIC). The HALT act sets a 15-day limit on stays in solitary and ends the use of solitary for the most vulnerable populations, including juveniles, pregnant women, seniors, and people with mental illness. In 2021, the HALT Act was passed in New York state.

=== Torture and solitary confinement ===
T'ruah has been an outspoken critic of torture. Executive Director Rabbi Jill Jacobs wrote in the Jewish Week that torture is "ineffective", "morally wrong", and against Jewish law. T'ruah launched the Jewish Campaign Against Torture in 2005, with more than 800 rabbis signing T'ruah's Rabbinic Letter Against Torture. T'ruah also condemns the use of prolonged solitary confinement in American prisons, which it says is a violation of basic human rights. T'ruah's work on national security also includes calling for the closing of the Guantanamo Bay detention center and related issues of indefinite detention. In a petition to President Barack Obama, T'ruah called Guantanamo Bay detention center a "national symbol of torture" and called upon the President to close it.

=== Immigration and sanctuary/Mikdash ===
T’ruah’s sanctuary network, Mikdash, is made up of over 70 member communities. T’ruah works as part of an interfaith network to mobilize synagogues and other Jewish communities to protect those facing deportation or other immigration challenges.

In 2018, 2019 and 2020, T'ruah helped organized Tisha B'Av demonstrations and vigils protesting family separation at the U.S. border.

=== Slavery and forced labor ===
T'ruah cites the Jewish connection to slavery and liberation at Passover as an imperative to oppose forced labor. T'ruah created The Jewish Campaign to End Slavery and Human Trafficking in an attempt to combat the record-high numbers of slaves today, as well as the root causes of trafficking in poverty and worker exploitation.

Through a partnership with the Coalition of Immokalee Workers, T'ruah started the "Tomato Rabbis" campaign to oppose low wages and trafficking of farm-workers in Southwest Florida. T'ruah and the CIW have urged restaurant chains and grocery stores to sign Fair Food Agreements and buy only from growers that "legally commit to higher ethical standards. In 2018, T'ruah began organizing Jewish communities to ask Wendy’s to join 14 major corporations in doing the same, and is partnering with the coalition to expand the Fair Food Program into additional states and crops.

T’ruah is the only Jewish organization that is a member of ATEST, the Alliance to End Slavery and Trafficking, a U.S. coalition dedicated to supporting those vulnerable to trafficking. T’ruah was also a founding member of the Worker-driven Social Responsibility Network.

=== Approach to the Trump Administration ===
Throughout the Donald Trump campaign and administration, T’ruah opposed several policy positions and actions including the "Muslim ban" that resulted in arrests of T’ruah rabbis during protests of these policies, the detention of migrants in U.S. Immigration and Customs Enforcement facilities, including after the COVID-19 pandemic began; and the separation of children from their parents at the southern border. T’ruah also condemned the Executive Order that affirmed that Jews were protected under the "race, color, or national origin" clause of Title VI of the Civil Rights Act of 1964, the proposal to label human rights groups as "antisemitic", and the appointment of Steve Bannon to the cabinet and David M. Friedman as ambassador to Israel.

Ahead of 2020 Election Day, T’ruah led trainings to offer a ministerial presence in case violence erupted before or after results were announced. On Election Day the organization partnered with groups such as Election Defenders and the Faith Matters Network, to ready members of their communities and organizations for a delay of days or weeks before winners are declared in some races due to the record use of mailed ballots. The organization called for the resignation or removal of Trump for the U.S. Capitol attack.

=== Other efforts ===
Previous efforts have included urging the Jewish National Fund to issue a public statement that it would no longer engage in property transfers and evictions over the Green Line; working to end discrimination against Bedouin citizens of Israel; speaking against the deportation of African migrants and the legislation surrounding it; and joining with a coalition of interfaith religious organizations working in solidarity with Muslims.

== Programs ==
=== Human Rights Shabbat ===
Human Rights Shabbat is an annual T'ruah initiative to educate Jewish communities about the intersection of Jewish values and universal human rights. Started in 2007, Human Rights Shabbat falls before International Human Rights Day, the yearly celebration of the passage of the Universal Declaration of Human Rights. Communities study Jewish text regarding human rights, discuss contemporary human rights struggles, and celebrate the connections between universal human rights and Jewish values. Over 130 communities participated in Human Rights Shabbat in 2012.

=== The North American Conferences on Judaism and Human Rights ===
In 2006, 2008, and 2010, RHR-NA held North American Conferences on Judaism and Human Rights, which brought together diverse groups of hundreds of rabbis and cantors, human rights activists, and energized supporters to learn how they can take action on the pressing human rights struggles of our day.

=== The Raphael Lemkin Human Rights Award ===
In 2006, 2008, and 2010, the Raphael Lemkin Human Rights Award was presented at the North American Conferences on Judaism and Human Rights.

In 2011, T'ruah shifted to an annual award ceremony that honors two rabbis for their human rights leadership, as well as one lay person who receives the Raphael Lemkin Human Rights award.

== Trainings for rabbis and rabbinical students ==
=== Rabbinical Student Fellowship in Human Rights Leadership ===
Since 2012, T'ruah has sponsored a Rabbinical Student Fellowship in Human Rights Leadership program. Through this program, a cohort of rabbinical and cantorial spend eight weeks working in a human rights/social justice organization in New York. Students spend two days at the T'ruah office, studying human rights in Jewish texts and learning with guest scholars and experts, and work three days a week in partner organizations of T'ruah.

=== Rabbinical Students for Human Rights: Year in Israel Program ===
Launched in 2011, the Rabbinical Students for Human Rights: Year in Israel Program offers rabbinical and cantorial students spending the academic year in Israel the opportunity to learn about human rights issues there, and to consider how to integrate such issues into their rabbinates. The program includes time in Israel and the Palestinian territories, featuring tours of Hebron and the South Hebron Hills in partnership with Breaking the Silence, tree planting in the South Hebron Hills with Combatants for Peace, tours of East Jerusalem in partnership with Ir Amim and local Palestinian groups, visits with asylum seekers in Tel Aviv, and trips to meet with Bedouin-Israeli citizens in the Negev. Students also have seminars with other Israeli and Palestinian human rights and civil society groups and leaders. A fellowship in the larger program offers six select cantorial and rabbinical students in-depth learning and training, along with the opportunity for leadership within the Year-in-Israel Program.

=== Training in human rights leadership for rabbis and lay people ===
T'ruah has led delegations of clergy and lay leaders on trips to Israel and the occupied territories, to witness firsthand and to take action on human rights issues. T'ruah conducts periodic conference calls and in-person training for rabbis to learn about current human rights issues, and to develop the skills to take leadership on these issues.
