= Chutzpah Collective =

American left-wing Jewish collective

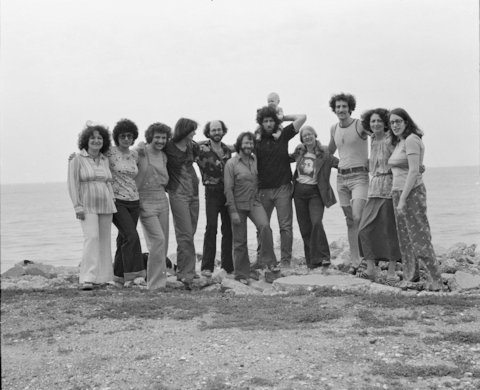
- Members of the Chutzpah Collective in 1977
- Founded: 1971
- Location: Chicago, Illinois, United States

The Chutzpah Collective (also known as the Chutzpah Jewish Liberation Collective) was a left-wing Jewish collective active in Chicago during the 1970s. The collective published the newspaper Chutzpah.

== History ==
The Chutzpah Collective was founded in 1971 as a "Jewish liberation collective". Members had been active in the movement against the Vietnam War and in the civil rights movement. The collective defined itself as anti-imperialist, anti-racist, and anti-sexist, and credited "emerging Black and Latino pride" movements for inspiring them to embrace Jewish pride. The collective supported the Soviet Jewry movement. Due to their opinion that "Arab threats to exterminate Israeli Jews" and because "Working-class Jews in changing urban neighborhoods were being physically harassed," the collective closely followed and partially supported the Jewish Defense League (JDL), but criticized the JDL's "right-wing racist politics." The collective had its roots with two dozen Jews gathered through friend networks, articles in underground papers such as the Chicago Seed, and Hillel rabbis. This group of Jewish activists called themselves "Am Chai", with some members of "Am Chai" going on to form other groups, including the Chutzpah Collective. The collective identified with "socialist Zionism" and critiqued leftists who allegedly gave uncritical support to Arab states and Palestinian militants, which was deemed antisemitic. Emphasizing "Yiddish consciousness" and "secular Judaism", the organization was dedicated to the Jewish socialist tradition in the US and Europe. Working-class Jewish issues were emphasized by the collective because they felt "the needs of working-class Jews are often ignored" because "Many Jews and gentiles deny that such Jews exist."

Embracing the women's liberation and gay liberation movements, the collective altered Jewish prayers to be gender-inclusive, held Seders dedicated to women and gay people, and developed new ceremonies such as the simchat bat, a welcoming ceremony for infant girls.

In December 1971, the collective held an "anti-imperialist" Hanukkah party. The collective objected to the commercialization of Hanukkah and the assimilationism they felt had turned the holiday into a "pale imitation of the goyish holiday of Christmas."

The journal Chutzpah was the official organ of the Chutzpah Collective. The first issue of Chutzpah was published in 1972.

In 1977, the collective published Chutzpah: A Jewish Liberation Anthology, which is simply a compilation of selected articles from the paper the collective published over the years.

The Chutzpah Collective existed for about a decade, disbanding in 1982.

== See also ==
- Jewish-American working class
- Jewish left
