= Lior Ben-David =

Israeli-British professional wrestler

Personal information
- Born: Netanya, Israel

Professional wrestling career
- Ring name(s): Lior Ben-David; The Chutzpah
- Billed height: 6 ft 1 in (185 cm)
- Billed weight: 220 lb (100 kg)
- Trained by: Danny Boy Collins; Brian Kendrick
- Debut: 2012

Leeor Brooks, mostly known by his ring name "The Chutzpah" Lior Ben-David, is an Israeli-British professional wrestler and stand-up comedian. He is best known for his work on the European independent circuit.

== Career ==
Brooks was an amateur boxer before he started a career as a professional wrestler. His debut match took place in 2012 with a local Israeli promotion. Later he traveled to England to train under the guidance of Danny Boy Collins and started to work for different promotions across Europe and North America. In 2016 he became the first Israeli to work under the banner of the American promotion Combat Zone Wrestling. His appearance in CZW was popular in Israel, as his signature move The Chosen People's Elbow was showcased on the popular tv-show Hazinor. Brooks was the subject of a Kan 11 documentary in early 2018, which saw him winning a match at the Golden City Showdown event in front of a hostile crowd in Prague.

== Personal life ==
Outside professional wrestling, Brooks is performing as a stand-up comedian.

== Championships and accomplishments ==
- Ultimate Wrestling Israel
  - UWI Shomer Shabbos Heavyweight Championship (1 time)

== See also ==
- List of Jewish professional wrestlers
