= Jewish Funds for Justice =

American charity (1984–2012)

- Abbreviation: JFSJ
- Formation: 1984; 42 years ago
- Founder: Si Kahn and David Tobin
- Dissolved: 2012; 14 years ago
- Tax ID no.: 52-1332694
- Legal status: 501(c)(3) nonprofit organization
- Headquarters: New York City, New York, United States of America
- Coordinates: 40.7477734°N 73.9933646°W
- President and Chief Executive Officer: Simon Greer
- Revenue: $6,024,357 (2011)
- Expenses: $6,007,281 (2011)
- Employees: 71 (2010)
- Volunteers: 20 (2010)
- Formerly called: Jewish Fund for Justice

The Jewish Funds for Justice (JFSJ) was an American charity based in New York. In 2005, Simon Greer became its president and CEO. In 2011, Progressive Jewish Alliance merged with Jewish Funds for Justice and became a new organization, Bend the Arc.

== History ==
The original Jewish Fund for Justice was created in 1984. Si Kahn and David Tobin spent eighteen months organizing the Fund. Its first board chair was Kahn and its first executive director was Lois Roisman.

Ruth Wisse argues that the Jewish Fund for Justice is one of a number of left-of-center Jewish organizations founded in the 1980s without explaining why a new, specifically Jewish charity was needed, in her view, the actual motivation was a need felt by highly educated people to counter rising antisemitism by means of "public avowals of kindliness and liberalism."

Jewish Funds for Justice was created in 2006 when the Jewish Fund for Justice merged with The Shefa Fund, which had been founded in 1990. Jewish Funds for Justice then merged with Spark: The Partnership for Jewish Service in February 2007.

On June 1, 2011, Progressive Jewish Alliance merged with Jewish Funds for Justice, adopting the name Bend the Arc in 2012.

== Divisions ==
- Through Jewish Funds for Justice's Alliance and Base Building Division, Jewish Funds for Justice worked to solidify the broad foundation of a Jewish social change movement. The activities of this division include congregation-based community organizing, supporting Jewish social change alliances, and online action.
- Through Jewish Funds for Justice's Capital Programs division, Jewish Funds for Justice mobilized Jewish financial resources to create social change. This division made grants to community-based organizations, invested Jewish dollars in community development financial institutions, and supported the post–Hurricane Katrina rebuilding of the Gulf Coast of the United States.
- Through Jewish Funds for Justice's Leadership Institute, Jewish Funds for Justice trained hundreds of Jewish social change leaders. Programs included the Selah Collaborative Leadership Program and the Rabbinical Leadership for Public Life programs.
- Through Spark: The Center for Jewish Service Learning, Jewish Funds for Justice inspired Jews to integrate community service into their lives through ongoing Jewish service learning programs and service and learning travel programs.

== Activities ==
- In May 2007, Jewish Funds for Justice organized a coalition of more than twenty Jewish organizations in an attempt to focus the attention of the 2008 American presidential candidates on the domestic priorities of American Jews. The coalition produced an online survey that received nearly 9,000 responses. The online survey identified health care as the top domestic concern of American Jews.
- Jewish Funds for Justice has been called a catalyst of the synagogue organizing movement. In February 2007, Jewish Funds for Justice brought together more than 300 leaders from 63 different congregations to discuss their involvement in community organizing. Jewish Funds for Justice also published a booklet and a video on Congregation-based Community Organizing.
- After Hurricane Katrina struck the coast of the Gulf of Mexico, Jewish Funds for Justice frequently spoke out about the need for fair and rapid redevelopment of the region. Jewish Funds for Justice co-sponsored the Blueprint for Gulf Renewal, published in August/September 2007 by the Institute of Southern Studies/Southern Exposure.
- Jewish Funds for Justice maintained a blog that served as an online hub for Jewish netroots action and Jewish perspectives on contemporary issues of social and economic justice.
- Jspot.org, a project of Progressive Jewish Alliance and Jewish Funds for Justice, supported protesters at Occupy Wall Street, stating, "Many of us have found this call to action in our Judaism."

== Recognition ==
- In October 2007, Jewish Funds for Justice was included in Slingshot, a Resource Guide to Jewish Innovation for the third consecutive year. Jewish Funds for Justice was one of only eight organizations to receive a grant from The Slingshot Fund in coordination with its inclusion in Slingshot.
- Rabbi Jill Jacobs, then the Rabbi-in-Residence at Jewish Funds for Justice, was included in The Jewish Daily Forward's Forward 50 in 2006, for "almost single-handedly forc[ing] the movement to refocus on one of the oldest issues on the social agenda: workers' rights".
- In 2011, Charity Navigator gave four out of four stars to Jewish Funds for Justice for finances as well as for accountability and transparency. In 2015, Charity Navigator gave one star to Bend the Arc for financials and four stars for accountability and transparency.
- Jewish Funds for Justice's Senior Vice President Jeffrey Dekro received a Community Impact Award from the National Federation of Community Development Credit Unions in June 2007.

== Other Resources ==
Jacobs, Rabbi Jill (2010). There Shall Be No Needy: Pursuing Social Justice through Jewish Law and Tradition. Jewish Lights. ISBN 978-1580234252.
