= Bend the Arc =

American progressive Jewish political organization

- Formation: 1999; 27 years ago
- Type: Nonprofit
- Headquarters: Los Angeles
- Website: bendthearc.us

Bend the Arc: A Jewish Partnership for Justice is a progressive Jewish American political organization that supports social justice, focusing strictly on domestic issues. Bend the Arc does not deal with issues related to Israel.

== Positions ==
Bend the Arc has been noted for its work protesting the policies of the administration of U.S. President Donald Trump. Leaders of the organizations have argued that Trump has emboldened white nationalism, and disrupted an October 2019 speech by Trump in Pittsburgh by chanting "Trump Endangered Jews."

According to an article in Tablet magazine, "the group has no active dues-paying members who participate in the shaping of their agenda."

In April 2025, Bend the Arc was among ten progressive Jewish organizations that signed an opposing letter encouraging representatives to reject the Antisemitism Awareness Act.

The organization endorsed Zohran Mamdani as mayor of New York City.

== Leadership ==
Stosh Cotler became Bend the Arc's Executive Vice President in 2011 and CEO in 2014. When Cotler became CEO, The Forward noted that she was "one of the few women leading a national Jewish group of its size."

== History ==
The Progressive Jewish Alliance (PJA) was founded in 1999 by Douglas Mirell, Steven Kaplan and Joan Patsy Ostroy, after the closure of the Los Angeles chapter of the American Jewish Congress. They sought to assert a Jewish interest in the campaigns for social justice in Southern California, which has the United States' second largest Jewish population. Progressive Jewish Alliance expanded in February 2005 by opening a San Francisco Bay Area chapter. The PJA stated goals are social justice, judicial reform, and improved working conditions. They also try to facilitate dialogue between non-violent young offenders and their victims and between Jews and Muslims.

PJA ran the Jeremiah Fellowship, which trains young Jews to be future social justice leaders. In addition, the PJA conducted education programs and quarterly holiday events on the intersection of art, culture and politics.

On June 1, 2011, the Progressive Jewish Alliance merged with Jewish Funds for Justice (JFSJ), and the consolidated group adopted the name Bend the Arc in 2012. Faiza Ali was associated with the group.

== See also ==
- Jewish left
- Jews Against White Nationalism
