= Jewish Labour Bund (Australia) =

Australian Jewish socialist organization

Jewish Labour Bund ייִדישער אַרבעטער בונד
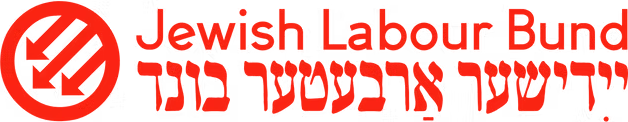
- Founder: Sender Burstin
- Founded: 1928
- Headquarters: Melbourne, Victoria, Australia
- Newspaper: Undzer Gedank (defunct) LINKלינק (unofficial)
- Youth wing: SKIF
- International affiliation: International Jewish Labour Bund (defunct)
- Slogan: Frayhayt, glaykhayt un gerekhtikayt (Freedom, equality and justice)
- Anthem: Di Shvue

Website
- bundist.org

The Jewish Labour Bund (Yiddish: ייִדישער אַרבעטער בונד, romanized: Yidisher Arbeter Bund), more commonly known as the Jewish Labour Bund Melbourne (Yiddish: ייִדישער אַרבעטער בונד מעלבורן, romanized: Yidisher Arbeter Bund Melburn), the Australian Bund, or simply the Bund, is the Australian wing of the Bundist movement. It was a member of the International Jewish Labor Bund, and is the largest and most active Bundist organisation left in the world. The Australian founding of the organisation in 1928 by Jewish Polish immigrants, expanded rapidly after the Second World War with the mass arrival of Holocaust survivors to Australia. The Bund is currently registered in the state of Victoria, where it is legally known as the Jewish Labour Bund, Inc., and is based primarily in the city of Melbourne.

== History ==
=== Foundation and Interwar Years ===
The Bund was founded in Melbourne in 1928 by the newly arrived Polish Jew Sender Burstin together with 12 other Melbourne Bundistn. The first public function by the then-named Bundist Group in Melbourne (Yiddish: די בונדישע גרופּע אין מעלבורן, romanized: Di Bundishe Grupe in Melburn) was a commemoration for Beynish Mikhalevitch, a Polish Bundist leader and head of TSYSHO, the Bundist-led secular Jewish school system. Initially, the group's efforts were focused on supporting the Bund in Poland through collecting funds for TSYSHO schools and the daily Bund newspaper in Poland, Naye Folkstsaytung (The New People's Daily).

Already in 1935, the notion of an economic boycott of Nazi Germany was being discussed among Jews and Jewish organisations in Melbourne. The Bund and Burstin supported the boycott, with support of much of the European Yiddish-speaking Jews in Melbourne. English-speaking Anglo-Jews, were against the boycott at this time. The Committee to Combat Hitler's Germany had Bundists in both president and secretary roles.

In efforts to engage more with local politics, it began cooperating with the Communist Gezerd, which was co-founded by Burstin himself. The two groups formed a "Joint Culture Committee" in 1939 whose slogan was 'strength in unity'. The Committee proclaimed that it attacked the local forces of Jewish 'reaction' and sought to project an alternative voice in political and cultural affairs within the Jewish community (as opposed to the influence of the traditional Anglo-Jewry). It had a focus on current events, organising talks around: the potential for World War, Poland's precarity vis-à-vis Nazi Germany, the threat of Japan to Australia, and local issues. However the two organisations came to blows after the Soviet-Nazi pact; which the Bundists abhorred. The Bund would leave the Committee in protest and in retaliation dual membership between the Bund and Gezerd was barred by the latter, with the Bund being accused of "Social fascism". This included Burstin himself who was expelled from the Gezerd.

Arriving in Melbourne in 1940, Bialystok Bundist leader Jacob Waks established ties between the Australian Bund and the Australian Labor Party. Waks is credited with campaigning for Arthur Calwell, then Minister for Immigration, to provide Australian visas to Jewish displaced persons following World War II. Waks died in 1956 and his funeral was attended by Calwell, who was deputy leader of the Labor Party at the time.

=== During the Second World War ===
During the war years, the Bund held public gatherings, named Lebedike Folks Tsaytung (live people's newspaper), to announce events from the ghettos and camps in Poland, as information reported by Australian media and local Jewish media was scarce and inaccurate. Audiences of approximately 400 people would attend these public gatherings and they included many non-Bundist Jews in Melbourne. This led to greater acceptance of the Bund in the Jewish community.

In 1942 the Jewish Council to Combat Fascism and Anti-Semitism was founded, with it soon de facto becoming the leader of the Jewish community during this time, acting as the official public relations representative of the Victoria Jewish Board of Deputies. The Bund took a leading role within the organisation. The Jewish Council had the support of most of the left-of-centre Jewish organisations during the war: including the Bund, Jewish pro-Soviet organisations, Labor Zionists, Liberal Jewish organisations.

Sender and Waks, after meeting with a newly elected Arthur Calwell, were invited to speak at the Victorian Labour Party 1943 Easter Conference in front of 500 delegates. Waks shared his experiences of living under Nazi rule and the fate of the Jews. As a result, the conference adopted a resolution admonishing Hitler's Germany, with an urgent plea to the federal Labor government for assistance.

After the Warsaw Ghetto Uprising in 1943, the Bund was the only group in Melbourne to call a meeting to commemorate the martyrs of the uprising. The Bund continues to mark the uprising with a commemoration annually on 19 April.

=== Cold War ===
Following the Second World War, the Bund rapidly grew due immigration from Eastern Europe and soon affiliated itself to the pro-Labor New Australia Council (NAC). The survival of the Bund in Melbourne has been attributed to this wave of immigration as the city had a smaller Jewish presence before 1945, and many Eastern European Jewish Holocaust survivors resettled in the city: giving it the highest per capita number of holocaust survivors in the world outside of Israel. The organisation's prominence has also been attributed to the work of prominent Bundist Bono Wiener, who eschewed international affairs & debates and focused on the Bund's role within local politics: especially in promoting pro-migrant policies within the Labor Party through the NAC, of which he became Chair.

During the early stages of the Cold War the Bund took an Anti-Communist stance and cooperated with local Zionist groups in Victoria to marginalise the Jewish Council within the Victoria Board of Jewish Deputies. The Bundists had turned against the group after their refusal to condemn late Stalin-era antisemitism like the 1952 Czech Slansky show trial or the Doctors' plot. Some of this anti-communist sentiment was also driven by the dissolution of the Polish Bund by the new communist regime in Poland a few years earlier.

In 1966, Uruguayan Bundists wrote of the Bund in Melbourne that it was "the only Bund Organisation in the world to have youth and children's organisations".

During the 1970s this anti-communist stance of the Bund in the Cold War would ease however as the next generation of Bundists became active in the organisation, with many of members of the SKIF youth movement campaigning against Australia's participation in the Vietnam War, despite opposition from their elders. However despite this shift in position vis-à-vis the Cold War, the organisation would still continue protest the domestic antisemitic policies of the Soviet Union, such as the ban on emigration. During this time the Bund was active in cooperating with the Labor Party, the Fabians, and with young Aboriginal campaigners, along with engaging in early Environmental activism.

Author and former SKIFist (a member of the SKIF) Arnold Zable describes the arrival of Russian Jews in the 1980s and 1990s as an inflection point for both the Melbourne Jewish community and for the Bund:

They [the Russian Jews] were the newcomers, on –and again on the one hand there were people that welcomed them, because of that strong sense of looking out for your fellow Jew within the community, and I know that Kadimah [a Bund-aligned Yiddish cultural centre], for example, has been acting that role. It's one of the few places where they were able very soon to come and have their concerts and their gatherings but on the other hand, you speak to Russian Jews and they’ll often talk about their sense of being outsiders within a community and that they weren't made as welcome as they thought they should be. So, you know, things are always in flux. And evolving and there's no easy answer to a question like that.

=== 21st century ===
The Bund has seen an upswing in activity and membership, especially since the COVID-19 pandemic. It is the largest surviving Bundist organisation in the world.

=== Role in preserving Yiddishkeit ===
The Bund has been crucial in continuing the active use of Yiddish in the city, with this being attributed to the fact that early Bundists made an explicit effort to preserve its use. Bundists have been involved in the founding of the First Yiddish Supplementary (Yiddish: צוגראָב, romanized: Tsugrob) School in Melbourne and Sholem Aleichem College.

Historian of 20th century Jewish History David Slucki has stated that the Bund in Melbourne "is instructive as an example of a Bund organization that saw great success and influence in the local Jewish community and crafted their message in line with local circumstances.". Likewise Arnold Zable has stated that the SKIF and Bund act as an "important antidote" to the 'overwhelming strength' of Zionism within the Australian Jewish community, and that the Bund's ideology of doikayt or "Hereness" has been important in preserving both Yiddish culture and a Jewishness that is rooted in living in Australia, as opposed to focusing around Israel.

== Activities ==
=== Political activism ===
The group has been involved in condemning the current adverse policy of the Australian Government towards migrants, refugees, and asylum seekers. Along with this, Bundists and SKIF members have been involved with: campaigning for Aboriginal Land Rights, campaigning for the rights of Soviet Jews to Emigrate, Anti-Vietnam War Activism, opposition to the flooding of Lake Pedder and Franklin Dam, and contemporary anti-racist, environmentalist, pro-migrant, and gay-marriage movements. The organisation supports the Indigenous Voice to Parliament, and hosts Truth-telling conversation programmes with first peoples. The group also actively condemns the Russian invasion of Ukraine.

=== SKIF ===
Every year the Bund runs both summer and winter camps for its SKIF youth wing, along with the weekly Sunday meetings the organisation undertakes. The Melbourne SKIF the only remaining active branch of the organisation left in the world. It was founded in 1950 by two Immigrants from Eastern Europe, Pinkhas (Pinye) Ringelblum and Symkhe Burstin, based on how the organisation had functioned in Poland prior to the Second World War.

=== Events and organisations ===
The Bund organises a yearly Yoyvl or "Anniversary" to commemorate the anniversary of the original General Jewish Labour Bund's foundation.

In cooperation with SKIF, the Bund also organises an annual commemoration of the Warsaw Ghetto Uprising on 19 April. The organisation has held commemorations in Melbourne on this date every year since the uprising in 1943.

Each year the Bund holds its Bono Weiner Memorial Lecture, often involving academics, activists, writers and politicians discussing various social issues. Notable past presenters include: Barry Jones AC, Pat Dodson, Julian Burnside, Behrouz Boochani, Nyadol Nyuon and Bruce Pascoe.

Through SKIF, in concert with the apolitical Yiddish cultural centre Kadimah the organisations hold the "In One Voice" Festival, a celebration of Jewish Culture in Melbourne including food, music, art, and handicrafts.

The Bund also established the J. Waks Cultural Fund (named after the aforementioned Jacob Waks), which organises Yiddish language cultural events.

There are also secular Jewish holiday events organised by the Bund. Regular events include Yom Kiper events for both adults and children and Tikkun Leil Sheuves for the broader Jewish community.

In 2022 the Bund launched an archive, which includes newspaper articles in both English and Yiddish, lectures by academics, and journalistic reports about the organisation.

==== Music ====
Along with this, the Bund runs a Yiddish language choir called Mir Kumen On. It is an unauditioned choir open to those of all musical and Yiddish language abilities. The choir was established in 2008.

Each Yoyvl has featured various Yiddish language artists from around the world performing music and poetry. These artists have included:

- Daniel Kahn & Psoy Korolenko
- Sasha Lurje
- Husky Gawenda & Gideon Preiss

The Bund's youtube channel posts recordings of performances of Yiddish Music put on by the organisation; such as the above but also songs like Di Shvue, Barikadn, and Daloy Politsey performed by the Mir Kumen On choir.

=== Zine ===
The group also publishes a zine in concert with its SKIF wing called "LINKלינק": meaning "LEFT" in both the Latin Yiddish and Original Yiddish alphabets. Recurring topics mostly include diaspora jewish politics (especially of the non-zionist type), social issues in Australia, and Golus nationalism. The zine describes itself as focused on "yiddishkayt, social justice and doikayt", and as mainly produced by former SKIFistn who are still younger Bundists (or Tsukunft).
