= List of Jewish anti-Zionist organizations =

Jewish organizations opposed to the existence of the State of Israel

This is the list of Jewish anti-Zionist organizations.

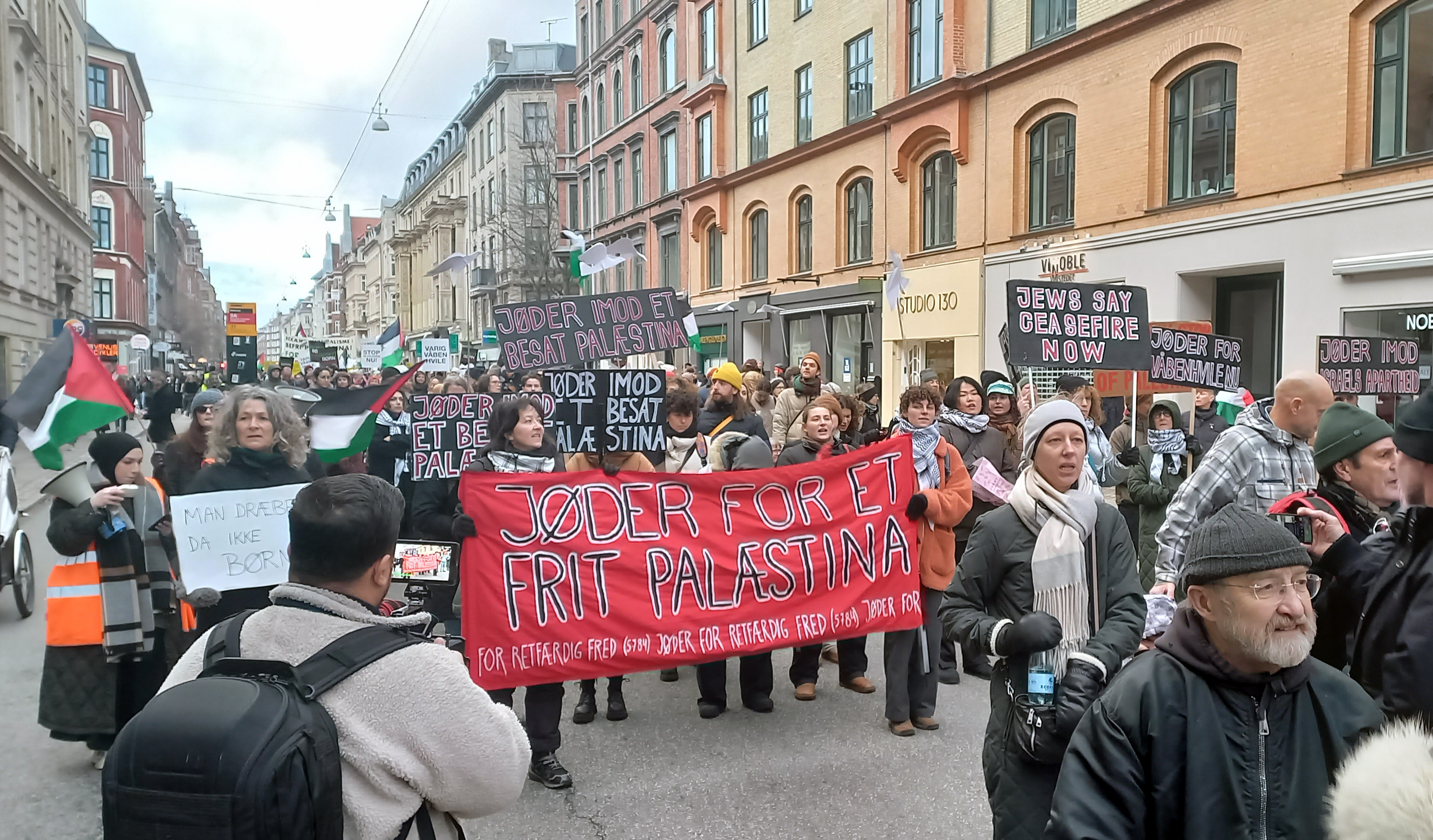
Jews for a Just Peace (Jøder for Retfærdig Fred) demonstrators with banners saying "Jews for a free Palestine", "Jews against an occupied Palestine", "Jews for ceasefire now", and "Jews against Israel's apartheid" during a protest march against the war on Gaza in Copenhagen, Denmark, February 02, 2024.

== Current and active ==
- American Council for Judaism in the United States
- Anarchists Against the Wall in Israel
- Edah HaChareidis in Israel
- Een Ander Joods Geluid in the Netherlands
- European Jews for a Just Peace european network, present in 11 countries
- Independent Jewish Voices in the United Kingdom and Canada
- International Jewish Anti-Zionist Network based in the United States, Canada, United Kingdom, Argentina, Spain and Germany
- Jerusalem Faction in Israel
- Jewdas in the United Kingdom
- Jewish Council of Australia in Australia
- Jewish Voice for Peace in the United States
- Jews for Justice for Palestinians in the United Kingdom
- Jews for Palestine in Mexico
- Judaism On Our Own Terms
- Judies X Palestina (Jews for Palestine) in Argentina
- Malachim in the United States
- Mishkenos HoRoim in Israel
- Neturei Karta in Canada, Germany, Israel, Palestine, the United Kingdom and United States
- Radical Bloc in Israel
- Satmar in the United States
- Shomer Emunim in Israel
- Sikrikim in Israel
- South African Jews for a Free Palestine (SAJFP)
- Torah Jews
- Union des progressistes juifs de Belgique
- Tsedek! in France
- Union Juive Française pour la Paix (UJFP) in France
- Vozes Judaicas por Libertacao (Jewish Voices for Liberation) in Brazil

== Historical and inactive ==
=== Europe ===
- Association of German National Jews in Germany
- General Jewish Labour Bund in Poland
- General Jewish Labour Bund in Romania
- General Jewish Labour Party in Poland
- Jewish Communist Labour Bund in Poland
- Jewish Communist Labour Bund (Ukraine)
- Jewish Communist Union in Ukraine
- Jewish Democratic Committee in Romania
- Jewish Social Democratic Workers Association "Zukunft" in Sweden
- Jewish Workers Bund in Poland
- Jutrzenka Kraków in Poland
- Komtsukunft in Poland
- Kultur Lige in Ukraine
- League of British Jews in the United Kingdom
- Morgnshtern in Poland
- Pink Peacock in the United Kingdom
- Reichsbund jüdischer Frontsoldaten in Germany
- Social Democratic Bund in Russia
- Yevsektsiya in Russia

=== Middle East ===
- Anti-Zionist League in Iraq
- Arbeter-ring in Yisroel – Brith Haavoda in Israel
- Black Panthers in Israel
- Jewish Anti-Zionist League in Egypt

=== North America ===
- American Jewish Alternatives to Zionism in the United States
- International Jewish Labor Bund in the United States
- Jewish People's Fraternal Order in the United States
- Jewish Socialist Federation in the United States

== See also ==
- Anti-Zionism
- Bundism
- Haredim and Zionism
- Jewish left
- Jewish pro-Palestinian activism
- Jews Against Zionism
