= Bundism =

Secular Jewish socialist movement

Bundism (Yiddish: בונדיזם, romanized: Bundizm) is a Jewish socialist movement that emerged in Europe in the late 19th century that aimed to promote working-class politics and secularism and to foster Jewish political and cultural autonomy. As a part of the wider movement for Jewish Autonomism, it also sought to advocate Yiddishism—the promotion and vitalisation of the Yiddish language and Yiddish culture—and doikayt (Yiddish for 'hereness'): the concept that Jews have a right to live and organise where they already reside.

The first organizational manifestation was the General Jewish Labour Bund in Lithuania, Poland, and Russia, (Note: Yiddish: אַלגעמײנער ייִדישער אַרבעטער־בונד אין ליטע, פּױלן און רוסלאַנד, romanized: Algemeyner Yidisher Arbeter-bund in Lite, Poyln un Rusland) founded in the Russian Empire in 1897. Even with the dissolution of the first Bund in the 1920s, other Bundist organisations had already been established and continued to exist. Largest among them was the General Jewish Labour Bund in Poland in interwar Poland, which became a major political force within Polish-Jewish communities.

It had enjoyed much popularity among Eastern European Jewry; however, the Bundist movement was heavily damaged by the Second World War and by Nazism; more specifically, many Bundists were murdered during the Holocaust. Many Bundists were active in the struggle against Nazism.

After the war, the International Jewish Labor Bund, more properly the "World Coordinating Council of the Jewish Labor Bund," was founded in New York, with affiliated groups in Argentina, Australia, Canada, France, Israel, Mexico, South Africa, the United Kingdom, the United States, and other countries. Despite a decline through the late 20th century, the Bundist movement and its ideology have been undergoing a revival among some Jewish subpopulations in the late 2010s and early 2020s, according to Andrew Silverstein for The Forward.

== Background ==
During the mid-to-late 19th century, Eastern European Jewish politics was shifting away from the oligarchic politics of the kehilla and towards secular mass politics. Additionally, Jewish political thought expanded to include more general issues beyond Jewish issues alone, being joined by concerns of broader issues such as class issues and economics, as well as civil and political rights. This shift was joined by an increased assertiveness from Jewish politics.

One result of these political developments was the formation of the Bundist movement, which began the establishment the General Jewish Labour Bund in Lithuania, Poland and Russia in 1897 within the Russian Empire.

== Ideology ==
=== Marxism ===
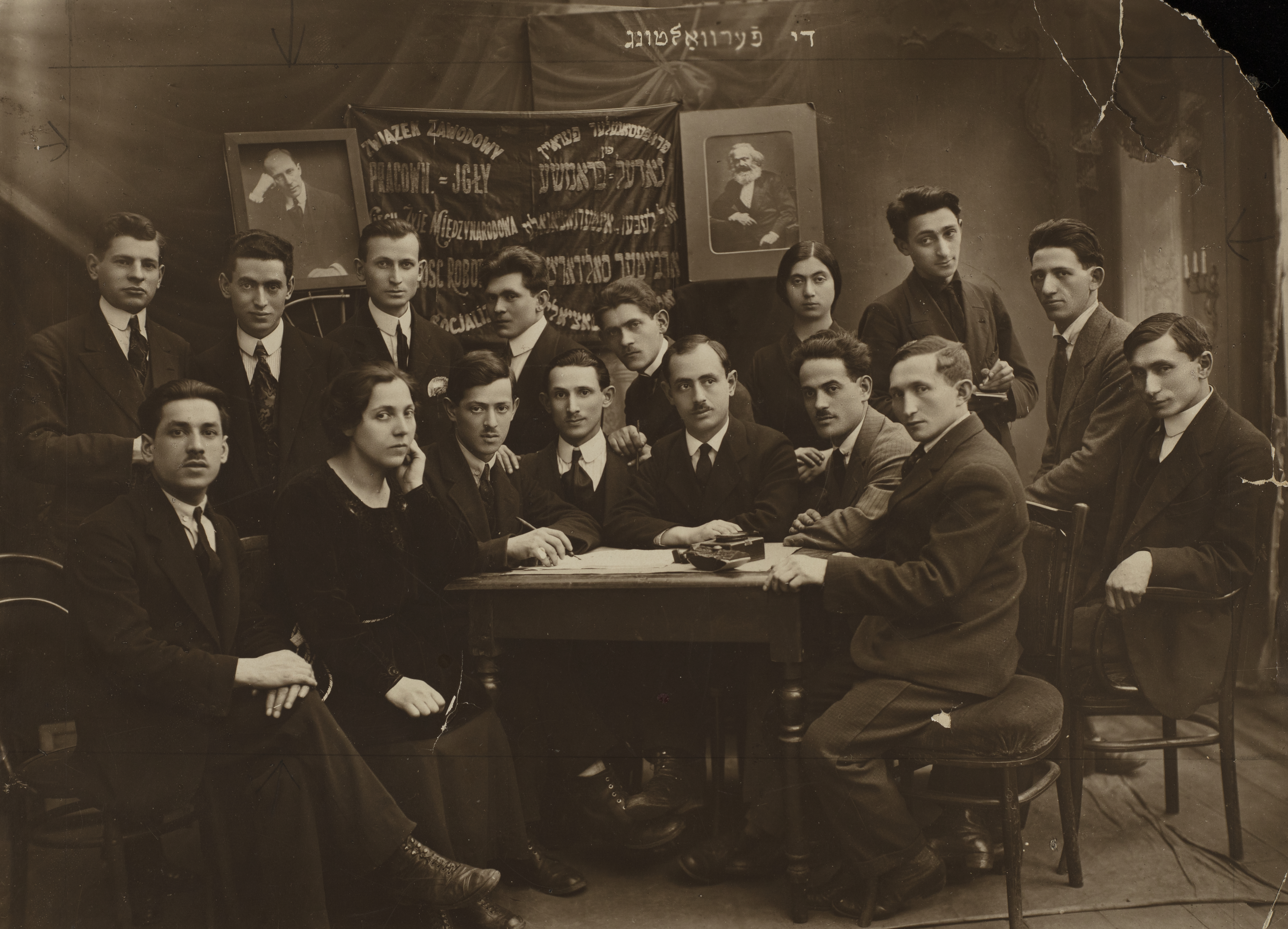
Executive Committee of the Warsaw Garment Workers' Union, 1917. Displayed in the back are portraits of Vladimir Medem and Karl Marx.

While the Jewish Labour Bund was a trade union as well as a political party, its initial purpose was the organisation of the Jewish proletariat in Belarus, Russia, Poland and Lithuania. It was criticised by individuals like Julius Martov and Vladimir Lenin for "Economism"—a claim rejected by Bundist leaders like Arkadi Kremer and Vladimir Medem. Many modern iterations of the Bund have divested from explicit Marxism but retain a public stance of advocating for socialism and/or social justice.

=== Secularism ===
A staunchly secular party, the Jewish Labour Bund took part in kehillot elections in the Second Polish Republic. The Bundists reviled the religious Jews of the time, even going so far as to refer to yeshiva students, who would live in poverty off charity and learn Torah instead of working, as "parasites". With the rise of Jewish secularism and the reduced political authority of religious institutions over Jewish life, some modern Bundist organizations do not consider this a primary focus.

=== Yiddishism ===
The Jewish Labour Bund was not initially interested in the Yiddish language as anything more than a vehicle to exhort the masses of Jewish workers in Eastern Europe. Soon, however, the Bund came to see the language and the broader Yiddish culture as valuable and promoted the use of Yiddish as a Jewish national language in its own right. To some extent, the promotion of Yiddish was part and parcel of the Bund's opposition to the Zionist movement and its project of reviving the Hebrew language. The preference for Yiddish over Hebrew also related to class struggle: Hebrew, prior to its revival, was mostly spoken by wealthy educated Jewish men and rabbis; Yiddish was a common language of Ashkenazi Jews.

It was also promoted in opposition to the Russification policies of the Russian Empire, once again with a class element, as upwardly mobile, middle-class Jews adopted Russian as their main language. With the decline of Yiddish as a spoken language, many Bundists now support the revitalisation of Yiddish as an explicit project (e.g., Bundist organisations in Australia sponsoring non-political Yiddish cultural centres for this purpose).

=== Doikayt ===
The concept of doikayt (דאָיִקייט, 'hereness'), from דאָ (here) plus ־יק (-ik) and the adjectival suffix ־קייט (-kayt, '-ness'), is and was central to the Bundist ideology, and it expressed its focus on solving the challenges confronting Jews in the country in which they lived. Bundism's focus was in contrast to the "thereness" of the Zionist movement, which posited the necessity of an independent Jewish polity in its ancestral homeland (i.e., the Land of Israel) to secure Jewish life. Today this often manifests in the forms of non-Zionism or anti-Zionism and a focus on local politics.

=== National-cultural autonomism ===
The Jewish Labour Bund did not advocate ethnic or religious separatism, but focused on culture as the glue of Jewish nationhood, within the context of a world of multi-cultural and multi-ethnic countries. In this, the Bundists borrowed extensively from the Austro-Marxist concept of national personal autonomy; this approach alienated the Bolsheviks and Lenin, who were derisive of and politically opposed to Bundism.

In a 1904 text, Social democracy and the national question, Vladimir Medem exposited his version of this concept:

Let us consider the case of a country composed of several national groups, e.g. Poles, Lithuanians and Jews. Each national group would create a separate movement. All citizens belonging to a given national group would join a special organisation that would hold cultural assemblies in each region and a general cultural assembly for the whole country. The assemblies would be given financial powers of their own: either each national group would be entitled to raise taxes on its members, or the state would allocate a proportion of its overall budget to each of them. Every citizen of the state would belong to one of the national groups, but the question of which national movement to join would be a matter of personal choice and no authority would have any control over his decision. The national movements would be subject to the general legislation of the state, but in their own areas of responsibility they would be autonomous and none of them would have the right to interfere in the affairs of the others.

=== Opposition to Zionism ===
==== Before the creation of the State of Israel ====
The Jewish Labour Bund, as an organization, was formed at the same time as the World Zionist Organization. The Bund eventually came to strongly oppose Zionism, arguing that emigration to Palestine was a form of escapism and that the Zionists had a utopian vision that was unachievable in "backward Turkey". After the 1936 Warsaw kehilla elections, Henryk Ehrlich accused Zionist leaders Yitzhak Gruenbaum and Ze'ev Jabotinsky of being responsible for recent antisemitic agitation in Poland by their campaign urging Jewish emigration.

==== After 1947 ====
The Bund was against the United Nations Partition Plan for Palestine and reaffirmed its support for a country under the control of superpowers and the UN. The 1948 New York Second World Conference of the International Jewish Labor Bund condemned the proclamation of the Zionist state. The conference favored a two-nation state built on national equality and democratic federalism.

A branch of the Jewish Labour Bund was created in Israel in 1951, the Arbeter-ring in Yisroel – Brith Haavoda, which even took part in the 1959 Knesset elections (albeit with a very poor electoral result). Its publication, Lebns Fregyn, remained in publication until June 2014. It was one of the last surviving left-wing Yiddish-language publications. The organisation dissolved in 2019, with its assets being transferred to the Zionist-Yiddishist organisation Beit Shalom Aleichem.

The 1955 Montreal 3rd World Conference of the International Jewish Labor Bund decided that the creation of the Jewish state was an important event in Jewish history that might play a positive role in Jewish life, but felt that a few necessary changes were needed. The conference participants demanded that:

1. the authorities of Israel should treat the state as property of the Jews of the world;
2. but it would mean that the affairs of the Jewish community in Israel should be subordinate to those of world Jewry.
3. the policy of the state of Israel would be the same toward all citizens regardless of their nationalities.
4. Israel should foster peace with the Arabs. This required halting territorial expansion and resolving the Palestinian refugee problem.
5. Yiddish should be taught at all educational institutions and would be promoted in public life.

The World Coordinating Council of the Jewish Labour Bund was quietly disbanded by a number of Bundists and representatives of related organizations, including The Workers Circle and the Congress for Jewish Culture in the early 2000s.

=== Contemporary developments ===
The Melbourne-based Jewish Labour Bund (founded in 1929) is considered the largest and most active existing organisation of the Bund. It organises a mix of events highlighting left-wing ideals (especially in Australia), concern for Jewish rights in Australia and abroad, and the preservation of Yiddish culture. It is the largest non-Zionist Jewish organisation in Australia. The Melbourne Bund also maintains the only existing wing of the Bundist SKIF Youth Organisation. The Australian Bund has ties to both the Australian Labor Party and Australian Greens, and has campaigned in favour of progressive social issues, such as the rights of migrants, and in favour of a "Yes" vote in the 2023 Australian Indigenous Voice referendum. It does not consider itself anti-Zionist, and has not participated in either pro-Israel or pro-Palestine rallies in Australia.

The early 21st century has witnessed a revival in the ideas of the Bund (sometimes called "neo-Bundism"). As such, some new social movements have adopted the aesthetics and ideology of the Bund; often adding decolonial thought as an adaptation of doikayt. One example of this is the Berlin-based Jewish Antifascist Bund (German: Jüdischer antifaschistischer Bund), an organisation of left-wing German Jews and Israeli immigrants that seeks to redefine the debate around antisemitism in 21st-century Germany away from support for Israel and posits that antisemitism is "firmly anchored in the centre of German society". The organisation regularly takes part in Nakba Day demonstrations and positions itself as anti-Zionist. In addition, as a result of their protests against the Gaza war, a group of Jewish students based out of Binghamton University formed the "New Yiddish Bund of Binghamton" in coordination with the Democratic Socialists of America in October 2023. The group published a manifesto in November of that year seeking to gain international support and cooperation, centreing Bundism as an alternative to Zionism within the modern Jewish diaspora. The group has drawn criticism from the aforementioned groups, however, for its focus on anti-Zionism and a lack of discussion of labour issues.

== Bundist members of parliaments or governments ==
- Nadejda Grinfeld, member of the Sfatul Țării in 1917–1918
- Moshe Gutman, member of the Central Council of Ukraine in 1917, then minister without portfolio in the short-lived autonomous Belarusian National Council (1917–1918) and Belarusian People's Republic (1918–1919)
- Mikhail Liber (1880–1937), member of the Provisional Council of the Russian Republic in 1917
- Noah Meisel (1891–1956) member of the Saeima between 1922 and 1931 (twice reelected); Daugavpils city council member
- Moisei Rafes (1883–1942), member of the 1917 Russian Constituent Assembly and also of the Central Council of Ukraine; member, as General controller, of the General Secretariat of Ukraine (the chief executive body of the Ukrainian People's Republic from 28 June 1917 to 22 January 1918)
- Aleksandr Zolotarev (1879–1938), successor of Moisei Rafes
- Joseph Kissmann (1889–1967), member of the Chamber of Deputies of Romania in 1932–1933
- Szmul Zygielbojm (1895–1943), member of the National Council of the Polish government-in-exile (March 1942 until his suicide in May 1943)
- Emanuel Scherer (1901–1977), member of the National Council of the Polish government-in-exile after Szmul Zygielbojm's suicide; secretary general of the International Jewish Labor Bund (1961–1977)
- Michal Shuldenfrei (1887–1965), member of the Sejm in 1947–1948
- David Lewis (1909–1981), NDP member for York South in the House of Commons of Canada (1962–1963, 1965–1974)
- Josh Burns (b. 1987), Labor member for Macnamara in the Parliament of Australia (2019–present), former Chair of the Australian Bund's youth wing SKIF

== See also ==
- Jewish Social Democratic Workers Association "Zukunft"
- Jewish left
- Golus nationalism
