= Camp Hemshekh =

Jewish summer camp in New York, United States

Camp Hemshekh (Yiddish: המשך; "continuation" Literally: Camp "Continuation") was a Jewish summer camp in the United States, established in 1959 by Holocaust survivors who were active in the General Jewish Labour Bund in Eastern Europe. The camp was sponsored by the Bund and aimed to promote the principles of the Jewish socialist movement that had been active in the Second Polish Republic. These included secular Yiddish culture, equality and justice, and the Bundist concept of doikayt ("hereness"), which emphasized Jewish cultural and political engagement in one's country of residence rather than the pursuit of a separate homeland for the Jewish people. Participants in the camp were referred to as Hemshekhistn (singular: Hemshekhist).

Camp Hemshekh was located at five sites in New York State: Liberty (1959), Beecher (near Hunter, 1960), Turkey Point (near Saugerties, 1961), Hunter proper (1962–1968), and Mountain Dale (1969–1978).

Alumni of the camp included Daniel Libeskind, Binyumen Schaechter, Zalmen Mlotek, Gitl Schaechter-Viswanath, Lazer Lederhendler, and Gloria Brame.

== Ghetto Night and the "Ghetto Denkmol" ==
Ghetto Night was an annual event held on the third Sunday of August at Camp Hemshekh, serving as a day-long commemoration of Jewish partisans and victims of the Holocaust. The observance culminated in a bilingual program, presented in English and Yiddish, that conveyed the history and impact of the Holocaust through poetry and song. The event concluded with the camp walking in single file along a torch-lit path to the "Ghetto Denkmol" as the melody of Ani Ma'amin played softly in the background.

There were two versions of the Ghetto Denkmol at the camp. The first, constructed in 1962, was a small white wooden structure featuring a mosaic of a ghetto fighter created by Daniel Libeskind. The second version was a replica of a ghetto wall topped with barbed wire and embedded glass, along with six black signposts symbolizing the six million Jews murdered in the Holocaust. Each signpost bore the name of a death camp, inscribed in Yiddish. At the center of the memorial stood a mosaic of a ghetto fighter, also created by Libeskind. The figure in the mosaic depicted a young man in military-style clothing emerging from flames, one arm raised with a rifle, the other with a clenched fist.

On Ghetto Day, the oldest campers took turns standing watch at the memorial. A boy and a girl from the senior group maintained a solemn presence throughout the day, dressed in work shirts and red bandanas. They remained silent and changed shifts hourly, ensuring that the memorial was continuously guarded and that each of the oldest campers had the opportunity to participate in this observance.

== Music ==
Singing was a central activity at the camp. Mornings in the dining hall began with campers singing popular Yiddish and English songs. During rest hour, selected campers rehearsed Yiddish musical numbers in preparation for performances on Visiting Day, the midsummer Holocaust commemoration, or other cultural events. A common pastime for both campers and counselors was gathering to play the guitar and sing folk music.

== Memory as an element in the Camp ==
A banner above the stage in the hall where plays and social events were held displayed the phrase Lomir trogn dem gayst vos men hot undz fartroyt—"Let us carry the spirit that has been entrusted to us." A rock garden used for campfires and meetings was named in honor of Froim Lozer, a Bundist who advocated for the establishment of a public park in Łódź for industrial workers.

Wooden commemorative plaques were attached to trees throughout the camp, bearing the names of historical figures associated with Jewish resistance and activism, including Henryk Ehrlich, Victor Alter, Mordechai Anielewicz, Szmuel Zygielbojm and Emanuel Ringelblum.

== Reunions ==
=== 1987 reunion ===
On November 15, 1987, a Camp Hemshekh reunion was held at Windows on the World in the World Trade Center. Approximately 200 former campers attended.

=== 1999 reunion ===
A reunion took place on October 10, 1999, at Terrace on the Park in Flushing Meadows Park. Approximately 240 former campers, counselors, relatives and affiliates of the camp attended. Attendees received a booklet that functioned as both a songbook and an address list. The songbook contained 104 songs, approximately three-quarters of which were in Yiddish, presented in both Yiddish orthography and transliteration.

=== 50th Anniversary (2009) reunion ===
The 50th-anniversary reunion took place in New York City from October 10 to October 12, 2009. The main event occurred on October 11 at the Workmen's Circle Building. Saturday’s activities included informal potluck gatherings at the homes of former campers in or near New York City. Nine attendees visited the former camp locations at Hunter and Mountaindale, and photographs of the sites were displayed at the main event. Approximately 200 former campers attended the main event. About 200 campers came to the main event.

== See also ==
- General Jewish Labour Bund
- S.K.I.F.
- Tsukunft
- The Workmen's Circle
- Jewish Left
