= Sotsyalistishe Kinder Farband =

European Jewish youth organization

Flag of the Polish Skifistn in 1936

The Sotsyalistishe Kinder Farband or SKIF (Yiddish orthography: סאָציאַליסטישער קינדער־פֿאַרבאַנד, Polish: Socjalistyczny Związek Dziecięcy, 'Socialist Children's Union', or S.K.I.F.) was founded in Eastern Europe as the youth organisation of the Jewish Labour Bund, a Jewish Socialist political party. S.K.I.F has three core ideological principles: Chavershaft ("camaraderie", equality and empathy), doikayt ("Being here", Jews should live, build their culture and struggle for their rights wherever they dwell, rather than seeking refuge in a Jewish homeland), and Yiddishkeit (Jewish identity through Jewish and Yiddish culture). The plural form of a SKIF member is SKIFistn and the leaders who run SKIF are the Helfer, aged in their late teens to early twenties.

The S.K.I.F. in Poland is now defunct. The Melbourne S.K.I.F established itself in 1950. The Melbourne SKIF is the last remaining SKIF branch, and subsequently it is usually regarded as the SKIF organization itself. However, the SKIF in France didn't disband, but in 1963 changed its name to Club laïque de l'enfance juive (CLEJ).

== S.K.I.F. in Poland ==
In Interwar Poland and in Occupied Poland, various members of the Jewish Resistance were or had been associated with S.K.I.F. One of the leaders of the Warsaw Ghetto Uprising, Marek Edelman, had been a S.K.I.F. member, as were members of the underground Jewish Fighting Organization Boruch Pelc and Jurek Błones. Other notable Jewish members included the painter Yosl Bergner, the RAF pilot Rubin Lifszyc and the organizer of children's theater for the poor in the Warsaw Ghetto, Pola Lifszyc. Before World War II, S.K.I.F. organized summer camps for children. Marek Edelman, as a member of the organization, raised funds for playrooms for the children of the poor, in Warsaw.

== SKIF in Melbourne ==
The logo of the Melbourne SKIF

The SKIF in Melbourne, Australia, was established in 1950 by two Immigrants from Eastern Europe; Pinkhas (Pinye) Ringelblum and Symkhe Burstin, based on how the organisation had functioned in Poland prior to the Second World War. The first five children held weekly "Sunday meetings". They still have these today, with approximately 25 children attending. By the fourth year of Melbourne SKIF camps, there were enough campers to operate two separate camps. The organisation now runs three camps a year (summer, winter and autumn, which is for high schoolers only) and at its peak has an average camp attendance of eighty children. The final two years of membership are spent in an intensive training course to prepare those who wish to continue as leaders known as Helfer.

Within the Melbourne Jewish Community, it is the only non-Zionist youth movement and the only one to sit outside of the umbrella organization of the Zionist Youth Council. Activities are focused more on broader topics to do with culture around the Yiddish language (known as Yiddishkeit), rather than Israel or Jewish theology.

Whilst a number of activities and names pay homage to the groups socialist, worker past; the SKIF of today has a membership base with a broader political and social orientation. However, the group is still engaged in political activism (supporting Aboriginal Land Rights, environmentalism, anti-racism, pro-migrant policies, and same-sex marriage.) Historically SKIF members have been involved with campaigning for the rights of Soviet Jews to Emigrate, Anti-Vietnam War Activism, and opposition to the flooding of Lake Pedder and Franklin Dam.

Famous former SKIFistn include:

- Arnold Zable; author.
- Michael Gawenda; journalist and former editor, The Age.
- Sharon Goldfeld; paediatrician and public health physician.
- Husky Gawenda and Gideon Preiss; of indie-folk band Husky.
- Josh Burns; MP for Macnamara, was chair of the organisation.

== See also ==
- Jewish Labour Bund
- Tsukunft
- Camp Hemshekh
- Tsukunft shturem
