= Der yidisher arbeyter (Vilna) =

Yiddish-language periodical published in Vilnius, Lithuania

Der yidisher arbeyter (Yiddish: דער ייִדישער אַרבײטער, The Jewish Worker) was a Yiddish-language periodical. It began as a Jewish workers journal in Vilna. In December 1896, Vladimir Kossovsky became the editor of the publication. With the sixth issue of the journal, published in March 1899, it became an organ of the General Jewish Labour Bund. The publication became the organ of the Foreign Committee of the Bund, and John Mill became its new editor. Der yidisher arbeyter became increasingly a theoretical publication, and its articles often dealt with issues relating to the national question in Central and Eastern Europe.
