= John Mill (Bundist) =

Lithuanian Bundist

John Mill (1870–1952), also known as Yoysef Shloyme Mil, was one of the founders of the General Jewish Labor Bund. He was a leading activist during its first two decades.

Mill fled Russia after a wave of arrests of the Bundist leadership in 1898, living in Geneva. There, he established the Bund’s Foreign Committee and, when Der yidisher arbeyter, the Bundist paper published in Vilna, became the organ of this committee in 1899, he became its new editor.

He lived in Western Europe until World War I, mostly in Geneva and Paris. He emigrated to the United States in 1915, settling in Chicago and leaving active politics, but remaining close to Bundist circles and writing for Yiddish publications.
