= Social Democratic Bund =

- Leader: Raphael Abramovitch
- Founded: April 1920
- Split from: Jewish Labour Bund
- Ideology: Social democracy
- Political position: Left-wing

The Social Democratic Bund, or the General Jewish Labour Bund, the Bund (S.D.) or, later, the "Bund" in the Soviet Union (Yiddish: בונד„ אין ראטן־פֿאַרבאַנד"), was a short-lived Jewish political party in Soviet Russia. It was formed as the Russian Bund was split at its conference in Gomel in April 1920. The Social Democratic Bund was formed out of the right-wing minority section of the erstwhile Russian Bund. The party was led by Raphael Abramovitch. After 1923, it continued to exist in exile.

== Social Democratic Bund in Soviet Russia ==
Within the Social Democratic Bund there were two ideological streams, a left-wing tendency led by Abramovitch and a right-wing tendency led by Mikhail Liber. In the summer of 1920 Abramovitch travelled to Western Europe together with a Menshevik delegation. He did not return to Russia afterwards.

The Social Democratic Bund lived a shadowy existence. At public workers meetings it would condemn the Yevsektsia, the Jewish Section of the Communist Party. As of 1920, there was a Kiev-based All-Ukrainian General Committee of Bund (S.D.). In February 1921, mass arrests to Bund (S.D.) members took place in Vitebsk, Odessa, Kharkov, Rostov and Kiev. The Moscow Bund Club was raided on two occasions and materials confiscated. By March 1921 the party was largely defunct inside Russia. In 1922, the Social Democratic Bund representation abroad took part in a protest against a trial of Socialist-Revolutionary leaders in Moscow. As late as February 1923 it published Biuleten tsentralnogo komiteta Bunda ('Bulletine of the Bund Central Committee') from Moscow. The February 1923 issue spoke of Bund sections active in Moscow and Vitebsk.

== In Vilno ==
After Vilna/Wilno (present-day Vilnius) was annexed by the Second Polish Republic in 1922, the Wilno Social-Democratic Bund hesitated to join the General Jewish Labour Bund in Poland. The Wilno Social Democratic Bund distrusted the Polish Bund for its overtures to the Comintern, arguing that the Polish Bund had ceased to be a Social Democratic organization. However, in 1923 the Wilno Social Democratic Bund group merged into the Polish Bund.

== In exile ==
As of 1924, the Foreign Delegation of the Social Democratic Bund took part in the framing of the platform of the Russian Social Democratic Labour Party (Mensheviks) in Berlin, Germany. Its leading representatives (Abramovic, Yudin (Aizenshtat) and Grigori Aronson) were inducted into the Menshevik foreign delegation in Berlin. In March 1931, the Foreign Delegation of the "Bund" in the Soviet Union published an issue of the periodical Undzer Gedank ('Our Thought') from Berlin, with Abramovitch as its editor.
