= Jewish Workers Bund in Poland =

The Jewish Workers Bund in Poland was a short-lived alliance formed in January 1897, formed by the Jewish section of the Polish Socialist Party (consisting of ex-yeshiva students) and the Vilna-based Jewish Social Democratic group (which since the summer of 1895 had sent agitators to Warsaw, including John Mill, to establish their movement there). But the alliance soon fell apart, as the PPS Jewish section accused the Jewish Social Democrats of indifference to the Polish national question. The Jewish Social Democrats founded the General Jewish Labour Bund later the same year.
