= Tikkun Leil Shavuot =

Jewish study order

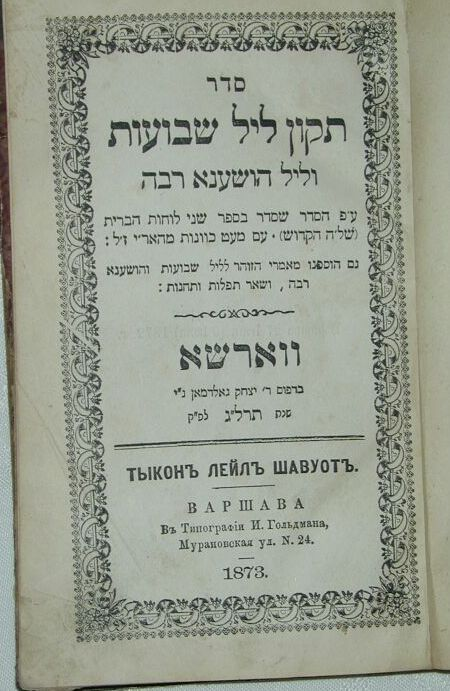
Tikun leil shavuot, 1873

Tikkun Leil Shavuot (Shavuot night fixing) is a study order intended for the eve of the Shavuot holiday, which includes beginnings and endings of Torah portions, and it is also called the traditional Torah study on the eve of the Shavuot holiday that lasts all night.

According to tradition, the Torah was given to the People of Israel in the morning of the Shavuot holiday, and the study is the preparation for the day of the Giving of the Torah. The source of the custom is the Zohar book, which was widely distributed in the thirteenth century, and since then the custom has spread to most Jewish communities.

== The Origin of the Name and the Reasons for the Custom ==
The name "Tikkun Leil Shavuot" comes from the Zohar book, where the Aramaic word "tikkun" appears, which in Hebrew means "adornment". The idea is that the people who recite the "tikkun" are the groomsmen who adorn the bride-the Torah, during the night, in preparation for her entering the wedding canopy the next morning, at the time of the reading of the Ten Commandments.

Some explain the name of the custom from the word "hatkana" (Installation) - preparation for the receiving of the Torah that a Jew is supposed to feel anew each year on the day the Torah was given.

Another reason given for the term 'tikkun' is that the study of the Torah on the night before the Giving of the Torah rectifies the sin of the Children of Israel who, according to the Midrash on the Song of Songs, slept late on the day the Torah was given, instead of watching eagerly, and the Holy One, Blessed be He, had to wake them with thunder and lightning.

== Sources ==
- Faierstein, Morris M. (2010). "Tikkun Leil Shavuot". Conservative Judaism. 61 (3): 76–79. doi:10.1353/coj.2010.0018. ISSN 1947-4717.
