= Arbeter-ring in Yisroel – Brith Haavoda =

Arbeter-ring in Yisroel – Brith Haavoda אַרבעטער-רינג – ברית עבודה
- President: Josef Fraind
- Founded: 1951
- Dissolved: 2019
- Headquarters: 48 Kalisher Street, Tel-Aviv 65165 (until 2019)
- Ideology: Bundism; Socialism; Jewish anti-Zionism
- International affiliation: International Jewish Labor Bund (defunct)

The Arbeter-ring in Yisroel – Brith Haavoda (Yiddish: ברית עבודה – אַרבעטער-רינג אין ישׂראל, lit. 'Worker's Circle in Israel – Labor Alliance') was the Israeli branch of the International Jewish Labor Bund, launched in 1951 and disbanded in 2019.

== History ==
The Bund in Israel was founded by Holocaust refugees that settled in Israel as a result of the situation-post and having family in Israel rather than political conviction; many of them had come from states with active Bundist movements like Poland and Lithuania and had opposed Zionism in diaspora.

During the 1950s and 60s the organisation had c.2,000 members.

Upon its dissolution the organisation transferred most of its assets to the Beit Shalom Aleichem; a Yiddishist-Zionist organisation.

=== Electoral participation ===
The Israeli Bund chapter presented a list at the 1959 Knesset election, under the name Socialist Union, but failed to win a seat with only 1,322 (0.1%) votes of the roughly 8,100 required.

== Ideology ==
As such, the organisation became focused on the Bundist ideals of Doikeit or "Hereness", promoting Yiddish culture in Israel in the same way they had in their countries of origin. While the group openly supported justice for Palestinians and Mizrahi Jews alike, it found difficulty reaching out to these groups due to its refusal to organise in any language other than Yiddish. The Israeli Bund opposed the anti-Yiddish policies of the Zionist movement and Israeli government, although failed to preserve the language; with many of its own members not teaching the next generation how to speak it.

== Activities ==
The Israeli Bund ran biweekly meetings, lectures, a theatre troupe, and a choir.

== Staff ==
=== Secretaries ===
Its first secretary was Isachar (Oskar) Artuski (birth name: Eichenbaum/Aykhenboym, 1903 or 1908-1971), a former Polish Communist who had joined the Bund in 1935. He was also the founder and first editor of Lebns Fragn (see below) and a correspondent of an American Trotskyist magazine “Labor Action”.

Since 2006 the present secretary has been Josef Fraind, who immigrated to Israel from Warsaw in 1952.

=== Other ===
Bella Bryks-Klein has been the Director of Cultural Events and Library since January 2007 to the present.

== Lebns Fragn ==
The Israeli Bundist magazine was Lebns Fragn (Yiddish: לעבנס־פֿראַגן, Life questions), founded in May 1951 by Isachar Artuski, the responsible editor was Ben-Zion "Bentsl" Tsalevitsh (1883-1967), who moved to Mandatory Palestine in 1922. After Artuski's death in November 1971, Yitskhok Luden became its editor. Ceased publication in 2014.

== Iconography ==
- a scanned front page of Lebns Fragn

== Filmography ==
- Bundists in Israel (Bundaiim), 2007 (director: Eran Torbiner), see the synopsis page on the website bundism.net and the director's short bio on the same site. The whole documentary has been put online on Youtube by its director.
- "The Bund: Utopia For Real", 1998(?) (Director: Izzy Abrahami), "From the members of the Israeli Bund club in Tel Aviv we hear of the oppression the Bundists have suffered in Zionist Israel..." For more information
