= Jewish Social Democratic Workers Association "Zukunft" =

The Jewish Social Democratic Workers Association "Zukunft" (Yiddish for 'future') was a Bundist organization in Stockholm, Sweden. The association (also using the name 'Social Democratic Group "Zukunft"') was founded in 1902. It was affiliated to the General Jewish Labour Bund via its Foreign Committee in Geneva. C. Zeitel was the secretary of the association.

During its initial year, the identity of the group was kept secret. As of 1907, the association claimed to have around 40 members. In the same year it contacted the Swedish Social Democratic Party and sought cooperation with them to host a public meeting on the 10th anniversary of the founding of the Bund. The meeting was organized by the arbetarkommun of Stockholm on October 8, 1907. Bernand Jofé of the Bund spoke at the meeting.

In October 1908, the Executive Committee of the Swedish Social Democratic Party granted 100 Swedish krona to the association, to set up a reading room for emigree activists in Stockholm. Another 100 krona was allotted by the Stockholm arbetarkommun. The reading room was set up in Folkets Hus, rented jointly by Zukunft and the Israeli Workers Association.

The support given from the Swedish Social Democrats to Zukunft caused a rift between the association and the Stockholm-based Support Group of the Russian Social Democratic Labour Party. The RSDLP group was led by Bernhard Mehr who claimed that since the Bund had merged into the RSDLP, the economic assistance should not have been given to Zukunft directly. A year later, the rift has settled and Zukunft, the Israeli Workers Association and the RSDLP support group decided to run the reading room jointly. The economic assistance from the Swedish Social Democratic Party was however discontinued.

Bundist activities continued in Sweden, at least until the late 1940s.
