= Tsukunft shturem =

The Tsukunft shturem (English: Future Storm) was the self-defence organisation of the Tsukunft, the youth organisation of the General Jewish Labour Bund in Poland, between 1929–1939. Its centre was Warsaw, where the shturem had 200–300 members.
