= Mikhail Liber =

Russian Bundist politician

- מיכאל ליבער
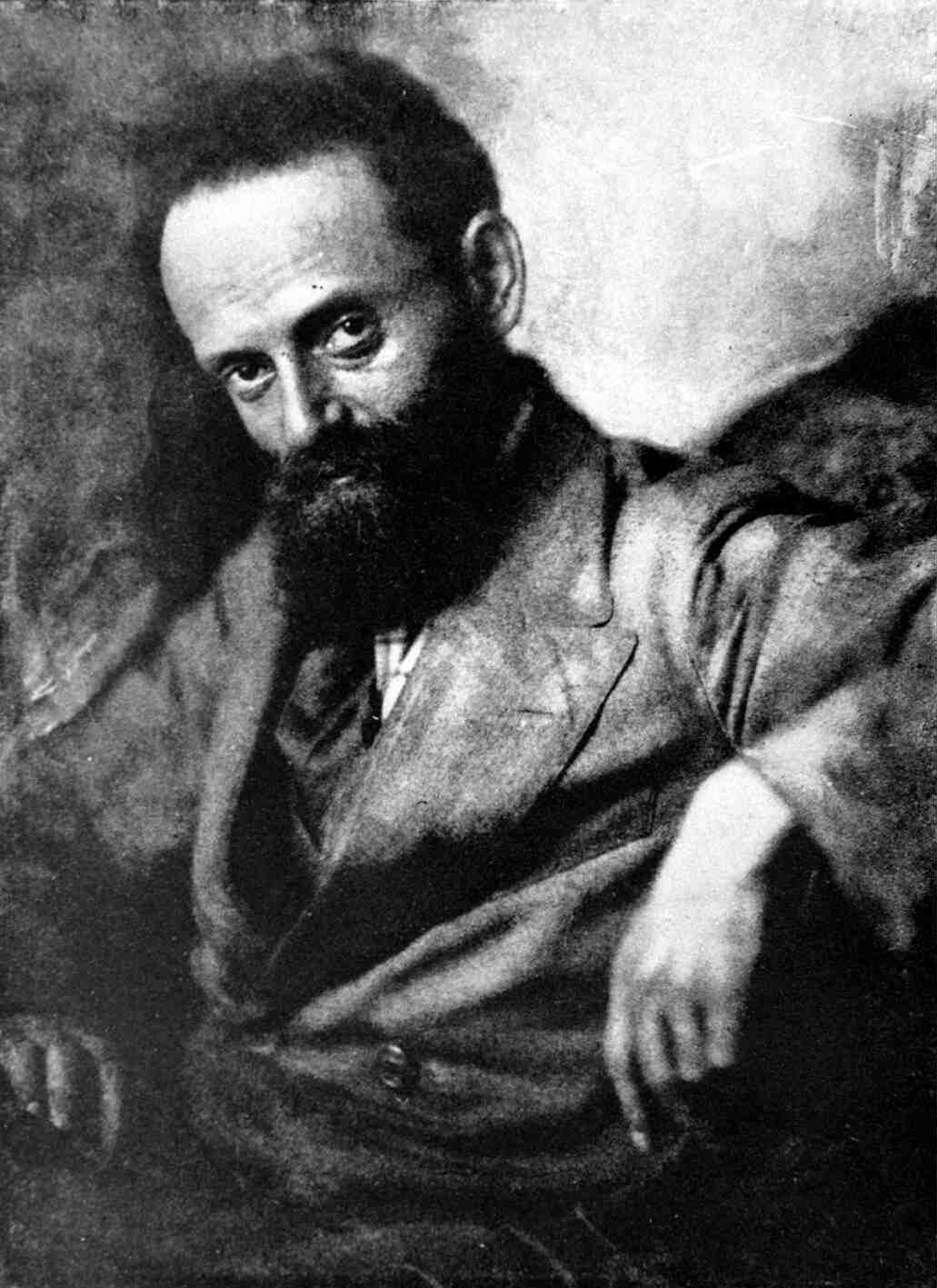
- Liber in 1917

Member of the Provisional Council of the Russian Republic
- In office 3 October 1917 – 7 November 1917
- Preceded by: Office established
- Succeeded by: Office abolished

Personal details
- Born: Mikhail Isaakovich Goldman; June 5, 1880 Vilnius, Vilna Governorate, Russian Empire
- Died: October 4, 1937 (aged 57) Alma-Ata, Kazakh SSR, Soviet Union
- Party: SDKPiL; Bund; RSDLP (Mensheviks)
- Parent: Isaac Goldman (father)
- Relatives: Boris Gorev (brother); Leon Goldman (brother)
- Occupation: Revolutionary
- Known for: Leader of the General Jewish Labour Bund in Petrograd during the Russian Revolution

Mikhail Isaakovich Liber (5 June 1880 – 4 October 1937), born Mikhail Goldman and sometimes known as Mark Liber, was a leader of the General Jewish Workers' Union (the 'Bund'). He also played a role in the Russian Social-Democratic Workers' Party (RSDRP) and was a leading figure among the Mensheviks. Liber was instrumental in the soviets during the February Revolution of 1917 but opposed to October Revolution. He was reportedly shot during the Purges. Liber played a defining role in the development of the Bund and helped shaped the policies of the leaders of the February Revolution.

== Life and career ==
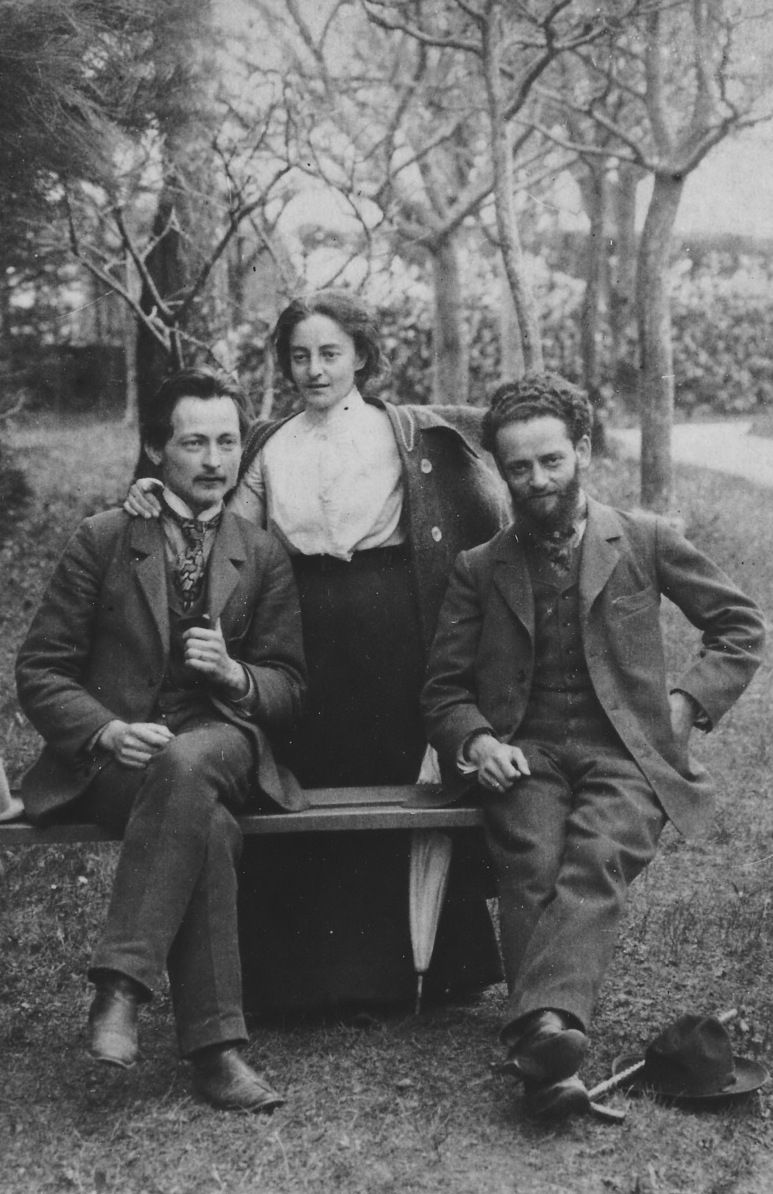
Liber (right) with his sister Julia and her fiancée Felix Dzerzhinsky, 1904

Mikhail Isaakovich Goldman was born in the Lithuanian city of Vilnius, then part of the Russian Empire, into a secular Jewish family. His father was a poet and office clerk. Like his older brothers, Boris and Lev (known as 'Gorev' and 'Akim' respectively), Mikhail became involved in radical student politics and was drawn to Marxism. He took an interest in the plight of Jewish workers in the Russian empire and joined the General Jewish Workers' Union in Lithuania, Poland and Russia (Algemeyner Yidisher Arbeter Bund in Lite, Poyln un Rusland, אַלגעמײַנער ײדישער אַרבעטער בונד אין ליטע פוילין און רוסלאַנד) in 1897. Goldman took the revolutionary pseudonym 'M. Liber', by which he became known. He soon rose to prominence in the Bund and was elected to its Central Committee in 1902.

The Bund competed, on the one hand, with non-Marxist Jewish socialist groups that were influenced by Russian populism and, on the other, with the emerging Jewish Zionist movement. The Bund rejected Jewish national separatism and eventually came out against the Zionist project of establishing a Jewish state in Palestine. The Bund stressed that the struggle for Jewish emancipation in the Russian empire must be linked with the struggle of the Russian proletariat, and for that reason sought close relations with Russian Social-Democracy. Nevertheless, the Bund insisted on the cultural autonomy of the empire's Jews and, accordingly, the organisational autonomy of the Bund within a federal Russian Social Democratic Labour Party. In internal debates within the Bund, younger Bundists like Liber placed greater emphasis on Jewish cultural identity than their more assimilationist elders (such as the Bund's founder, Arkadi Kremer), and on the need for propaganda in Yiddish aimed specifically at Jewish workers. In relation to the RSDLP, they argued for a looser, federal form of organisation, rather than a unitary centralised one.

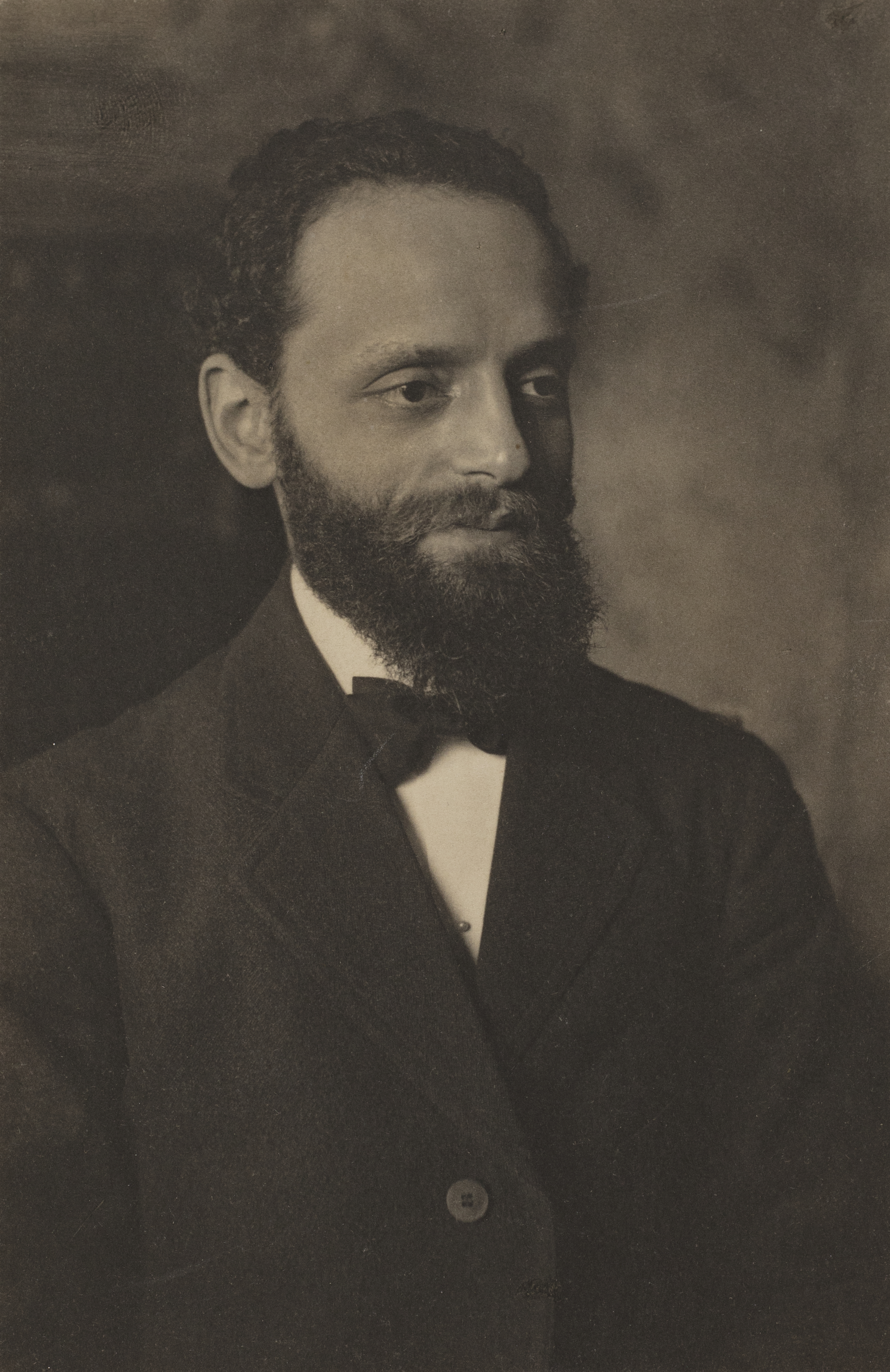
Liber in 1908

Liber was one of the Bund's representatives at the fateful Second Congress of the RSDRP in 1903, and the third most frequent speaker at the congress (after Vladimir Lenin and Leon Trotsky). He defended the Bund's demand to be recognised as an autonomous organisation within the RSDRP and as the sole legitimate representative of the Jewish proletariat in the Russian empire. This position was roundly rejected by both Lenin and I.O. Martov, soon to emerge as the leaders of the Bolshevik and Menshevik factions of the RSDRP. Martov had himself been a member of the Bund in the 1890s and one of Liber's former collaborators, but at the second congress, he supported Lenin in demanding the integration of the Jewish proletariat in an All-Russian Social-Democratic party. Martov proposed a more liberal criterion of party membership than Lenin, but by the time that issue led to the schism between Bolsheviks and Mensheviks, Liber and his fellow Bundist delegates had withdrawn in protest from the congress and from the RSDRP. It was the Bundists' exit that gave Lenin a slight majority at the congress (and hence enabled him to call his faction 'Bolshevik' - 'Majoritarian').

As the division between Bolsheviks and Mensheviks hardened, the Bund was increasingly drawn to the Menshevik side. The Mensheviks reversed their position on organisational federalism, making it possible for the Bund to rejoin the Menshevik wing of the RSDRP. In 1906, Liber represented the Bund at the 4th, Unification, Congress of the RSDLP in Stockholm when the Bund rejoined the party. At the 5th Congress in London in 1907 he was elected to the RSDLP Central Committee. During the abortive Revolution of 1905, Liber played a role as a Bundist representative in the soviets, even though he, like most SDs (including Lenin), initially greeted the new, spontaneous workers' organisation with some scepticism. When the Revolution petered out in 1907 and the autocracy reasserted its authority, Liber was one of those who advocated a more cautious, legalistic course of action for the RSDRP. Known as 'Liquidators' because they wanted to 'liquidate' the illegal underground organisation of the party, this group was fiercely opposed by Lenin as well as by 'Party Mensheviks' like Martov and Trotsky (then a Menshevik). However, Social-Democratic 'Liquidators' like Liber had counterparts among the Socialist-Revolutionaries, including Liber's contemporary A.R. Gots. Liber's subsequent close alignment with Gots in 1917 may have had its roots in their common 'Liquidationism' of the 1910s. During this period, Liber married, which may also have encouraged his emphasis on legal work.

In 1914, Liber at first opposed the First World War and took a moderate 'Internationalist' position. However, after the February Revolution of 1917, Liber called for war 'in defence of the revolution' and took up a 'Revolutionary Defencist' position. As a representative of the Bund and the Mensheviks, Liber played a major role in the soviets. He collaborated closely with Menshevik and SR 'Revolutionary Defencists' like F.I. Dan, I.G. Tsereteli, A.R. Gots, V.M. Zenzinov and N.D. Avksentiev - so closely that his name was often linked in Bolshevik propaganda with those of Dan and Gots, in a pun on the German phrase Dann lieber Gott! ('then, dear God!), as Danlibergots. Liber was a staunch supporter of Alexander Kerensky's Provisional Government, although he declined an offer to join the cabinet, preferring to concentrate on his work in the soviet. He represented the Bund in the Executive Committee of the Petrograd Soviet and was a member of the Presidium of the Central Executive Committee of the All-Russian Soviet. As such, Liber opposed not only the Bolsheviks but also Menshevik Internationalists like his old comrade Martov.

Liber opposed the October Revolution of 1917 and rejected the position taken by the Mensheviks and many Bundists, which called for negotiation with the Bolsheviks for the purpose of forming an all-socialist coalition government. This proposal then had considerable support among Mensheviks, SRs and even some Bolsheviks (such as L.B. Kamenev), to Lenin's great annoyance. Nothing came of it beyond a brief cooperation of the Left SRs with the Bolsheviks. Liber, for opposite reasons, agreed with Lenin that a unity government uniting the Bolsheviks with the moderate socialists they had just overthrown was politically impossible and would destroy the revolution. In taking this view, Liber parted ways with Dan, who had gone over to Martov's Menshevik Internationalists and eventually migrated to the far left of the Menshevik party. Owing to his anti-Bolshevism, Liber lost his leadership positions in the Menshevik party and in the Bund, but found himself in agreement with anti-Bolshevik SRs like Gots and Avksentiev.

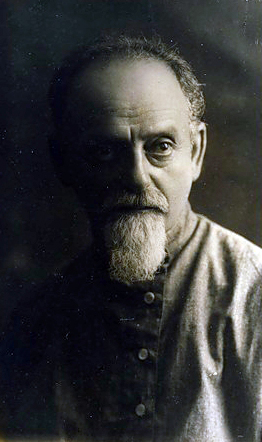
Liber later in life

Despite his fierce and public opposition to the Bolsheviks, Liber was not at first persecuted (perhaps because his brother-in-law was F.E. Dzerzhinky, (Note: Technically Liber's sister Julia died before she and Dzerzhinsky could be married.) first head of the Cheka). Liber spent most of the Civil War years in Ukraine, returning to Moscow in 1920. He resumed work in the Menshevik party (which was abandoning hopes of co-operation with the Bolsheviks). In 1922 he protested against the death sentences passed against A.R. Gots and his co-defendants at the 'Trial of the Right SRs'. Shortly thereafter, Liber was himself arrested and sentenced to internal exile. It was the first of several arrests in the course of the next 15 years. His final arrest occurred in March 1937, at the height of the Purges. Reportedly he was shot in October of that year, together with Gots. However, Soviet sources deny this and claim that Gots lived until 1940, while Liber retired from politics, devoted himself to business and died of natural causes.
