= Vladimir Medem =

Russian Jewish politician and activist

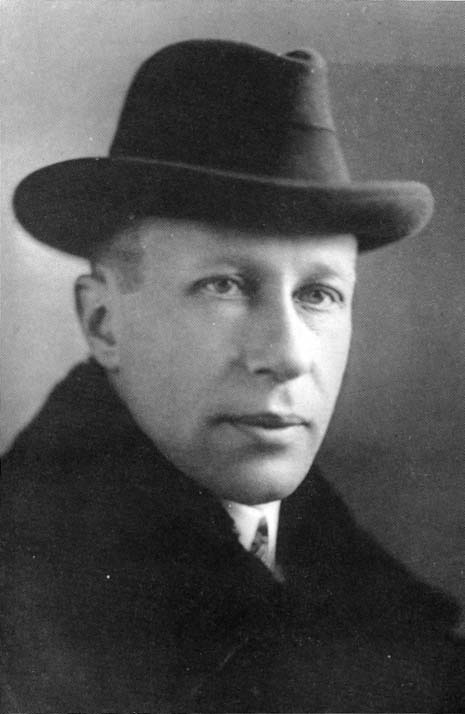
Picture of Medem from the Medem Library in Paris

Vladimir Davidovich Medem, né Grinberg (Russian: Влади́мир Дави́дович Ме́дем, Latvian: Vladimirs Mēdems; 30 July 1879 – 9 January 1923), was a Russian Jewish politician and ideologue of the Jewish Labour Bund. The Medem Library in Paris, the largest European Yiddish institution, bears his name.

== Life ==
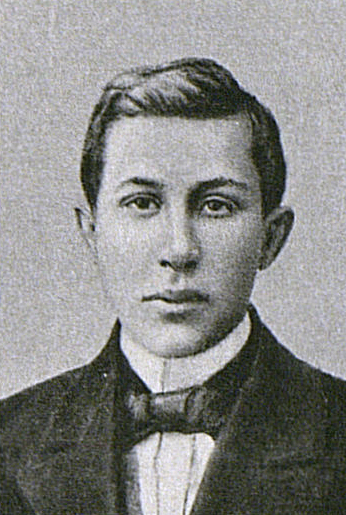
Medem in 1903

Son of a Russian medical officer who had converted from Judaism to Lutheranism, Vladimir Medem was educated in a Minsk gymnasium. He studied later at the Kiev University and developed an interest in the Yiddish-speaking proletariat and their harsh living conditions. He was preoccupied by the fact that the Russian Jews had no nation and no right to strike. In spite of his interest in Jewish affairs, Medem did not re-convert to Judaism. However, when arrested in 1901 for activities as a Bund member, he identified himself to the police as a Jew.

Medem only learned Yiddish at the age of 22; the language was taboo in his family environment. Because of a student strike in 1899, he had to leave the university, and at that time, inspired by Marxist friends, he joined the Minsk socialists. His great interest in the world of Yiddish-speaking workers, and in the problem of political antisemitism, drew him to become active in the Jewish Labour Bund (whose supporters were known as Bundists). Founded in 1897 in Vilna, Russian Empire (modern Vilnius, Lithuania) Medem would be crucial in shaping both the politics and the ideology of the Bund. Under Medem's influence the Bund adopted anti-clericalist, anti-assimilationist, and anti-Zionist policies; highlighted by the Fourth Congress of the General Jewish Labour Bund in Białystok, April 1901 where the Bund adopted an official position rejecting both the establishment of a Jewish State and the revival of the Hebrew Language.

This led to the secession of the party's Zionist faction into the Zionist Socialist Workers' Union under Ber Borochov; which in turn helped Medem and Arkadi Kremer solidify the Bund's position within the RDLSP. Medem viewed Zionism as an existential threat to the Bundist cause, since he believed emigration of Jewish revolutionaries from the Russian Empire would dilute their strength. This Bundist authority was undone at the 2nd Congress of the RSDLP however after Julius Martov's faction of the RSDLP voted against recognising the Bund as the "sole representative of the Jewish Proletariat", causing Medem and Kremer to leave the Congress in protest, and thus leading to Vladimir Lenin's majority faction gaining control of the party.

In 1918 the Bund was reestablished as a separate party in newly independent Poland, where Medem once again became its leading theorist.

Medem emigrated to the United States in 1921, arriving in New York in mid January; in the U.S. he served as a representative of the Bund in Poland. He died in New York less than two years later, on 9 January 1923. He is buried at Mount Carmel Cemetery in Queens, NY.

== Influence and legacy ==
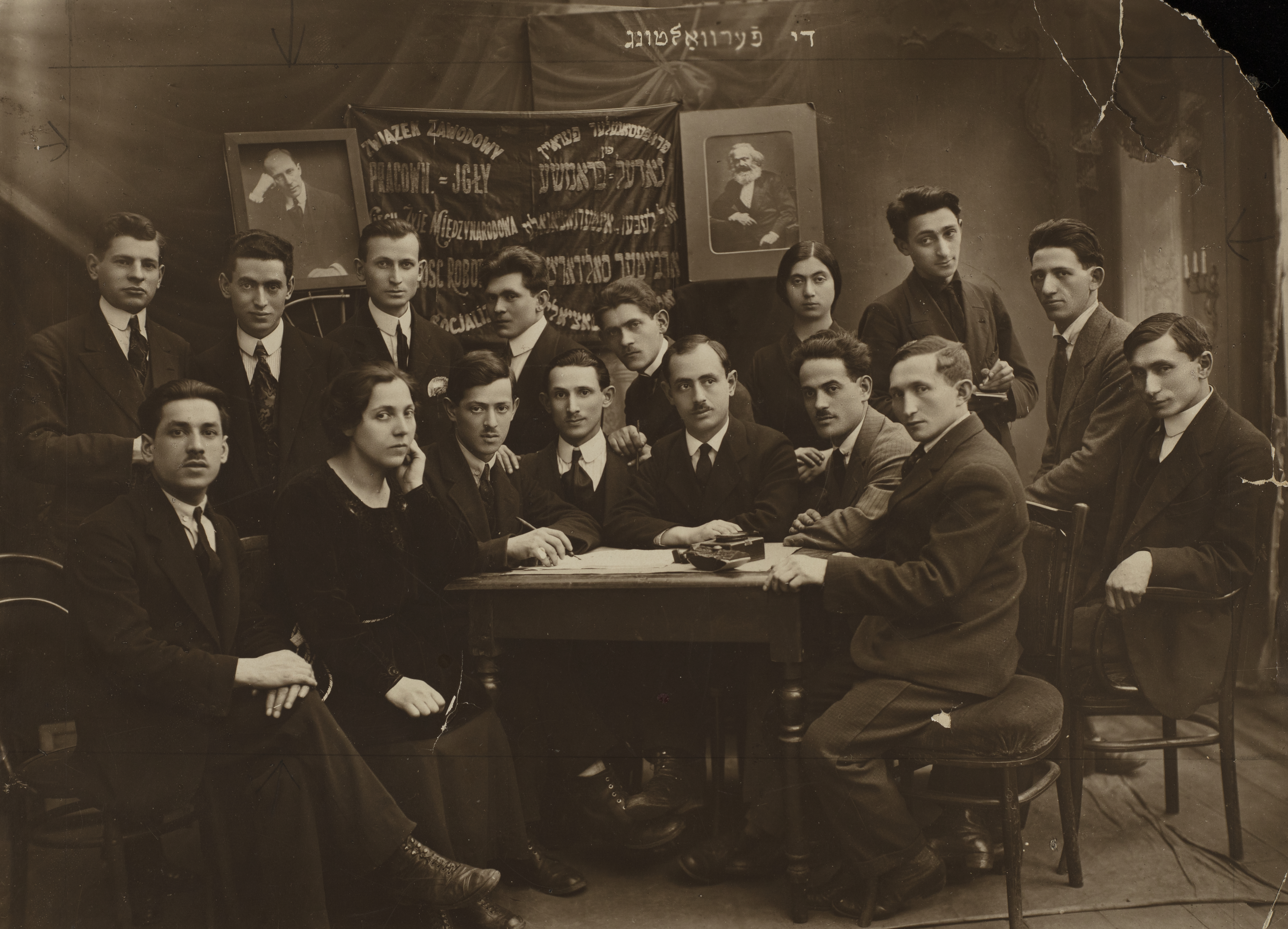
Executive Committee of the Warsaw Garment Workers' Union, 1917. Displayed in the back are portraits of Medem and Karl Marx.

The Jewish Labour Bund was committed to the cultural and national rights of Jews in Eastern Europe. In this regard, Medem dared to oppose the view of Russian Marxists, and even of Lenin. These objectives received support in Central and Western Europe, e.g. from Austromarxists, and especially in several Jewish immigrant workers' clubs in Paris, whose members described themselves as Bundists. One such club, which also saw the education of the workers as its main task was given the name Arbeter-klub afn nomen Vladimir Medem (The Vladimir Medem Workers' Club). His educational policy ambitions culminated in 1929 in the founding of the Medem Library, which at 30,000 volumes is now the largest Yiddish cultural institution in Europe.

== Main writings ==
- 1904: Social Democracy and the National Question
- 1916: The doctrine of the Bund
- 1938 (posthumous): Yiddish: Di legende fun der jidišher arbeter-bawegung (Hg. Gros, Naftole; Gros, Naftoli). Verlag Kinder-Ring, 87 S., illustrated; reedited by National Yiddish Book Center, Amherst, Mass. (USA) 1999. Collection: "Steven Spielberg digital Yiddish library" No. 06827

== See also ==
- National personal autonomy
