= Mass politics =

Form of political structure

Mass politics is a political order resting on the emergence of mass political parties.

The emergence of mass politics generally associated with the rise of mass society coinciding with the Industrial Revolution in the West. However, because of the extent of popular participation in the Protestant Reformation, it has been called the first mass political movement, which "other ideologies, ultimately more secular in tone" superseded.

Mass politics was essentially the inclusion of the masses in the political process. The first of these mass movements was arguably that for Catholic Emancipation in Ireland, led by Daniel O'Connell. There was a major rise in this from 1880 to 1914, when the vote in Europe was expanded to all men and in some countries, even women were allowed to vote. Mass based political parties emerged as sophisticated vehicles for social, economic, and political reform.
