= Moshe Gutman =

Belarusian and Ukrainian Jewish politician, activist, and Bundist

Moshe Lvovich Gutman (Belarusian: Мойша Львовіч Гутман, romanized: Mojša Lvovich Hutman; 21 September 1883 – 20 June 1938), also known as Moshe Kamenshtein, was a Lithuanian Jewish politician and activist who was active in Belarus and Ukraine in the first quarter of the 20th century. He was a member minister without portfolio in the short-lived independent Belarusian Democratic Republic (1918–19).

He was born in Vepriai, Kovno Governorate, present-day Lithuania.

In 1917, he was elected a member of the Ukrainian Central Rada. At the end of 1917 he was elected Member of the Executive Committee of the Belarusian National Council (temporary quasi-government of Belarus) as a representative of the Jewish minority.

Following the announcement of Belarus's independence in March 1918, he represented the Jewish minority in the Belarusian government. He also helped draft the first constitution of the Belarusian People's Republic.

He was executed in 1938, during the Great Purge.
