= General Jewish Labour Bund =

1897–1921 Jewish socialist party in Russia

General Jewish Labour Bund in Lithuania, Poland and Russia אַלגעמײנער ייִדישער אַרבעטער־בונד אין ליטע, פּױלן און רוסלאַנד
- Founded: 7 October 1897; 129 years ago
- Dissolved: 19 April 1921; 105 years ago
- Merged into: Yevsektsiya (Jewish Section) of the Russian Communist Party (Bolsheviks) (majority faction); Communist Party of Lithuania (members in Lithuania)
- Succeeded by: General Jewish Labour Bund in Poland "Bund" in Latvia; Social Democratic Bund; General Jewish Labour Bund in Romania (Bessarabian branch)
- Membership: 100,000+
- Ideology: Bundism; Socialism; Solidarity; Equality; Jewish Autonomism; Anti-Zionism; Anti-clericalism
- Political position: Left-wing

Party flag

The General Jewish Labour Bund in Lithuania, Poland and Russia, (Note: Yiddish: אַלגעמײנער ייִדישער אַרבעטער־בונד אין ליטע, פּױלן און רוסלאַנד, romanized: Algemeyner Yidisher Arbeter-bund in Lite, Poyln un Rusland) generally called The Bund, (Note: Yiddish: דער בונד, romanized: Der Bund cognate to German: Bund, lit. 'federation' or 'union') or the Jewish Labour Bund, (Note: Yiddish: דער יידישער ארבעטער־בונד, romanized: Der Yidisher Arbeter-Bund) was a secular Jewish socialist party initially formed in the Russian Empire and active between 1897 and 1920. A member of the Bund was called a Bundist. Between 1898 and 1903, the Bund was an autonomous part of the Russian Social Democratic Labour Party, but left after the Second Congress. The majority faction of the Russian Bund was dissolved in 1921 and incorporated into the Communist Party. Other remnants of the Bund endured in various countries.

In 1917, the Bund organizations in Poland seceded from the Russian Bund and created a new Polish General Jewish Labour Bund which continued to operate in Poland in the years between the two world wars. The International Jewish Labor Bund continued the legacy with coordinated Bundist groups around the world.

== Founding ==
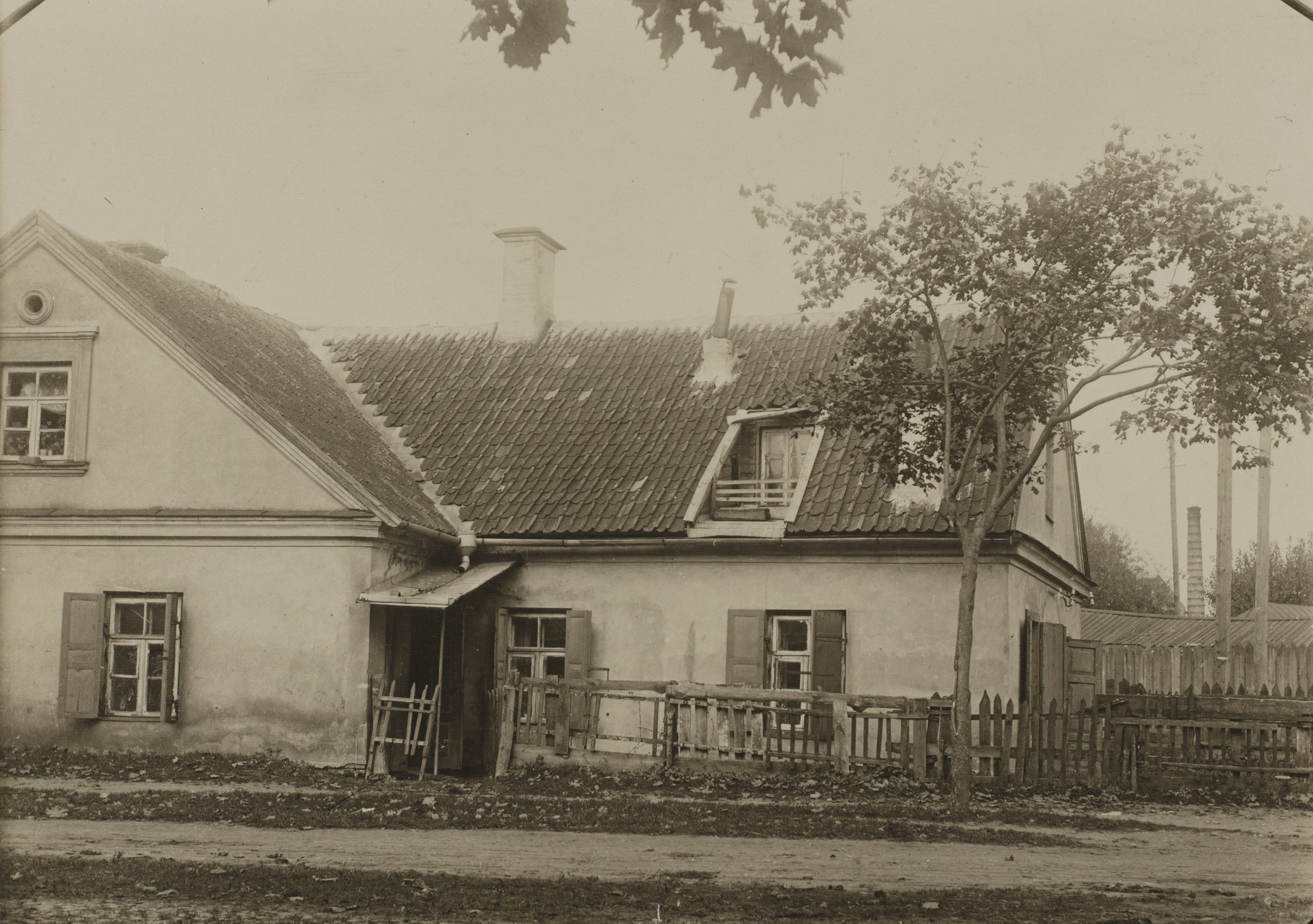
The house in Vilna where the Bund was founded

During the mid-to-late 19th century eastern Europe, Jewish politics was shifting away from the oligarchic politics of the kehilla, and religious conflict towards secular mass politics. Additionally, Jewish political thought expanded to include more general issues beyond Jewish issues alone, being joined by concerns of broader issues such as class issues and economics, as well as political rights and civil rights. This shift was joined by an increased assertiveness from Jewish politics.

The "General Jewish Labour Bund in Russia and Poland" was founded in Vilna on 7 October 1897. The name was inspired by the General German Workers' Association. The Bund’s roots were in underground circles of revolutionary study active in the late 1800s, where Jewish workers and intellectuals held discussions in socialist theory and organized in groups such as the “Jewish Social Democrats,” one of the first Jewish labor movements. These small circles began to develop into broader mass agitation following calls from leaders such as Julius Martov and Arcady Kremer for the Jewish proletariat to couple the struggle of obtaining civil rights for Jews with the wider economic needs of the Russian workers.

The Bund sought to unite all Jewish workers in the Russian Empire into a united socialist party, and also to ally itself with the wider Russian social democratic movement to achieve a democratic and socialist Russia. The Russian Empire then included Lithuania, Latvia, Belarus, Ukraine and most of present-day Poland, areas where the majority of the world's Jews then lived. They hoped to see the Jews achieve a legal minority status in Russia. Of all Jewish political parties of the time, the Bund was by far the most progressive party regarding gender equality, with women making up more than a third of all its members.

The Bund actively campaigned against antisemitism, and defended Jewish civil and cultural rights. As affirmed by Bundist leader Vladimir Medem, the Bund was not against assimilation but against the aim to assimilate; similarly, it was not against nationalism but against nationalist policy based solely on territory. Its position on Jewish national unity (klal yisrael) has thus been disputed. The Bund avoided any automatic solidarity with Jews of the middle and upper classes and generally rejected political cooperation with Jewish groups that held religious, Zionist or conservative views.

At the heart of the vision of the future of the Bund was the idea that there is no contradiction between the national aspect on the one hand and the socialist aspect on the other. As a strictly secular organization, the Bund renounced the quasi-religious aspect of the Zionist project and its use of the Hebrew language.

After Kremer and Kossovsky were arrested, a new party leadership emerged. A new central committee was set up under the leadership of Dovid Kats (Taras). Other key figures in the new party leadership were Leon Goldman, Pavel (Piney) Rozental and Zeldov (Nemansky). The 2nd Bund conference was held in September 1898. The 3rd Bund conference was held in Kovno in December 1899. John Mill had returned from exile to attend the conference, at which he argued that the Bund should advocate for Jewish national rights. However, Mill's line did not win support from the other conference delegates. The 3rd conference affirmed that the Bund only struggled for civil, not national, rights.

However, the Bund later reversed this position in its Fourth Conference in 1901, where it declared that its aims were also for the principle of equal national rights. In this conference, they promoted the idea of a Russia transformed into a federation of nationalities, each to enjoy “full autonomy, independent from the territory in which it resides.” The term nationality, stated the Congress, was to apply also to the Jewish people. Later, the demand for national-cultural autonomy, outlined in the Bund’s demands for cultural development of all nations and right to use one’s native language in government and social institutions, was integrated as a political demand in the Bund’s program. By the 8th Congress, the Bund’s interest in equal national rights for Jews, and the rights to develop a secular national culture, had become ingrained within Bund’s development of a national-cultural program.

In 1901, the word "Lithuania" was added to the name of the party.

The Bund's membership grew to 900 in Łódź and 1,200 in Warsaw in the fall of 1904.

During the period of 1903–1904, the Bund was harshly affected by Czarist state repression. Between June 1903 and July 1904, 4,467 Bundists were arrested and jailed.

In its early years, the Bund had remarkable success, gaining an estimated 30,000 members in 1903 and an estimated 40,000 supporters in 1906, making it the largest socialist group in the Russian Empire.

== As part of the Russian Social Democracy ==
Given the Bund's secular and socialist perspective, it opposed what it viewed as the reactionary nature of traditional Jewish life in Russia. Created before the Russian Social Democratic Labor Party (RSDLP), the Bund was a founding collective member at the RSDLP's first congress in Minsk in March 1898. Three out of nine delegates at the Minsk congress were from the Bund, and one of three members of the first RSDLP Central Committee was a Bundist. For the next 5 years, the Bund was recognized as the sole representative of the Jewish workers in the RSDLP, although many Russian socialists of Jewish descent, especially outside of the Pale of Settlement, joined the RSDLP directly. As of 1907, Jewish membership in the RSDLP was roughly 11,900.

At the RSDLP's second congress in Brussels and London in August 1903, the Bund's autonomous position within the RSDLP was rejected, with both the Bolsheviks and Mensheviks voting against, and the Bund's representatives left the Congress, the first of many splits in the Russian social democratic movement in the years to come. The five representatives of the Bund at this Congress were Vladimir Kossowsky, Arkadi Kremer, Mikhail Liber, Vladimir Medem and Noah Portnoy.

During this period two trade unions, the Union of Bristle-Makers (Bersther-Bund) and the Union of Tanners (Garber-Bund), were affiliated to the Bund. In its report to the 1903 Russian Social Democratic Labour Party congress, the Bund claimed to have district organizations in Vilna (Sventiany, etc.), Kovno (Ponevezh, Vilkomir, Shavli, Onikshty, Keydany, Yanovo, Shaty, Utena...), Grodno (Kartuz-Bereza, etc.), Białystok, Dvinsk (Rezhitsa...), Minsk (Borisov, Pinsk, Mozyr, Bobruisk, Parichi...), Vitebsk (Beshankovichy, Liozna, Lyady...), Warsaw, Łódź, Siedlce, Płock, Suwałki, Mariampol, Gomel (Dobryanyka, Vietka...), Mogilev (Shklow, Orsha, Bykhov, Kopys...), Zhytomyr, Berdichev, Odessa, Nizhyn, Bila Tserkva, Podolian Governorate (Vinnitsa, Bratslav, Tulchina, Nemirov), Lutsk, Volhynian Governorate, as well as the districts of the Union of Bristle-Makers; Nevel, Kreslavka, Vilkovyshki, Kalvaria, Vladislavovo, Verzhbolovo, Vystinets, Mezhdurechye, Trostyan, Knyszyn, and the districts of the Union of Tanners; Smorgon, Oshmyany, Krynki, Zabludovo, Shishlovichi, etc.

Per Vladimir Akimov's account of the history of social democracy 1897–1903, there were 14 local committees of Bund – Warsaw, Łódź, Belostok, Grodno, Vilna, Dvisnk, Kovno, Vitebsk, Minsk, Gomel, Mogilev, Berdichev, Zhitomir, Riga. Per Akimov's account the local committees had six types of councils; trade councils (fakhoye skhodki), revolutionary groups, propaganda councils, councils for intellectuals, discussion groups for intellectuals and agitators' councils. The Bristle-Makers Union and Tanners Union had committee status. Bund had organizations that weren't full-fledged committees in Pinsk, Sedlice, Petrokov, Płock, Brest-Litovsk, Vilkomir, Priluki, Rezhitsa, Kiev, Odessa, Bobruisk, and many smaller townships.

== Parliamentary representation ==
At the 1906 First Duma elections, the Bund made an electoral agreement with the Lithuanian Labourers' Party (Trudoviks), which resulted in the election to the Duma of two (apparently non-Bundist) candidates supported by the Bund: Dr. Shmaryahu Levin for the Vilna province and Leon Bramson for the Kovno province. In total, there were twelve Jewish deputies in the Duma, falling to three in the Second Duma (February 1907 to June 1907), two in the Third Duma (1907–1912) and again three in the fourth, elected in 1912, none of them being affiliated to the Bund.

== Policies ==
The Bund’s position was strongly anti-Zionist since its inception; its modus operandi was based upon the notion of doikayt, or hereness, which affirmed that Jews should advance Jewish culture where they lived, rather than supporting what Bundists considered an anti-semitic idea of Jews as strangers. Bundist opposition to Zionism was multifaceted; Vladimir Medem viewed Zionist as not only an unrealistic fantasy, but also as the equivalent of the bourgeois capitalist nationalism of the non-Jewish world and the antithesis to proletarian struggle.

The Bund did not advocate separatism. Instead, it focused on culture, rather than a state or a place, as the glue of Jewish "nationalism". In this they borrowed extensively from the Austro-Marxist school, further alienating the Bolsheviks and Lenin. The Bund also promoted the use of Yiddish as a Jewish national language and to some extent opposed the Zionist project of reviving Hebrew.

The Bund won converts mainly among Jewish artisans and workers, but also among the growing Jewish intelligentsia. It led a trade union movement of its own. It joined with the Poalei Zion (Labour Zionists) and other groups to form self-defense organisations to protect Jewish communities against pogroms and government troops. During the Russian Revolution of 1905 the Bund headed the revolutionary movement in the Jewish towns, particularly in Belarus and Ukraine.

The Bund recognized the Yiddish language as a social identifier. To maintain its national-cultural autonomy, the Bund advocated for the Polish Jewish minority to use its own language and maintain its cultural institutions in areas where it was considered a sizable portion of the local population. As a Germanic language, Yiddish also helped maintain the Bund's European identity. This can be compared to the strong anti-Yiddish campaign initiated by Zionist organisations and taking place in Palestine during the early twentieth century, where Yiddish newspapers were legally banned and systematical physical attacks took place against Yiddish speakers.

The Bund had a major role in maintaining and developing Yiddish, including Yiddish literature and other secular cultural uses of the language. It published its news in a Yiddish newspaper – Der Yiddisher Arbeyter (The Yiddish Worker) – which had been formed by the Jewish Social Democrats in 1896 as the first Yiddish newspaper in tsarist Russia.

== Activities ==
The Bund was heavily invested in building camaraderie and support internally. In the 1880s, the Bund created its first kassy in Lithuania and Belarus. The kassy was a mutual aid fund designed to support workers during strikes. Other similar funds were created to support the militia. In the case of a militiaman being wounded and then unable to work for an extended period of time, the Bund created a mutual aid fund, requiring every member to contribute regularly. When a member was wounded and their personal funds ran low, the Bund would step in and help cover costs. The idea supporting this approach was to increase solidarity amongst its members, reminding them that they were each responsible for one another and in struggle together.

The Bund also incorporated efforts to raise consciousness amongst its members and the Jewish working class. Between 1903 and 1904, the Bund “held 429 political meetings, organized forty-five demonstrations and forty-one political strikes, and distributed 305 leaflets.” They expanded these efforts by creating a youth organization, Tsukunft, in 1910 and published daily in their newspaper, Yugnt veker. Women in the Bundist movement actively engaged in fights for birth control and free childcare. Additionally, they put together study groups and shared readings and experiences.

== Activities in other countries ==
Less than a year after the founding of the party, its Foreign Committee was set up in Geneva. Also within the same timespan, Bundist groups began to constitute themselves internationally. However, the Bund did not construct any world party (as did Poalei Zion). On the contrary, the Bund argued that it was a party for action inside the Russian empire. The Bundist groups abroad were not included into the party structures. In 1902, a United Organization of Workers' Associations and Support Groups to the Bund Abroad was founded. The groups affiliated to the United Organization played an important role in raising funds for the party.

Between 1901 and 1903, the Foreign Committee was based in London. The United Organization, the Foreign Committee as well as the Union of Russian Social Democrats Abroad were all dissolved at the time of the Russian Revolution of 1917.

=== In Poland ===
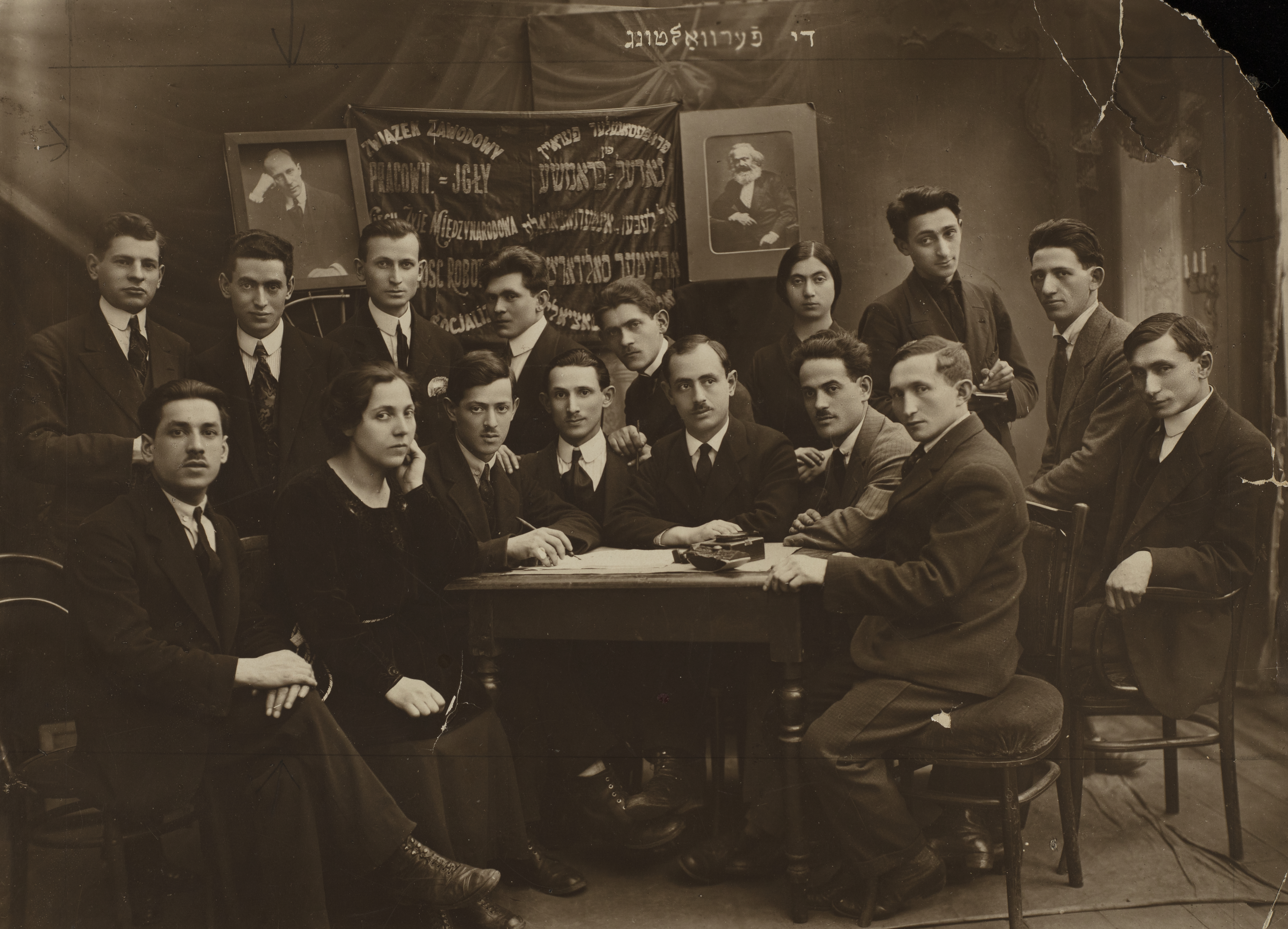
Executive Committee of the Warsaw Garment Workers' Union sitting in front of Karl Marx and Vladimir Medem's portraits, 1917.

When Poland fell under German occupation in 1914, contact between the Bundists in Poland and the party centre in St. Petersburg became difficult. In November 1914 the Bund Central Committee appointed a separate Committee of Bund Organizations in Poland to run the party in Poland. Theoretically the Bundists in Poland and Russia were members of the same party, but in practice the Polish Bundists operated as a party of their own. In December 1917 the split was formalized, as the Polish Bundists held a clandestine meeting in Lublin and reconstituted themselves as a separate political party.

=== In Latvia ===
The first local Bund organizations in Latvia had been established on 1900 in Daugavpils and on 1902 in Riga. In the autumn of 1904, the Riga Committee of the Latvian Social Democratic Workers Party and the Riga Committee of the Bund signed a co-operation agreement and founded the Riga Federative Committee. The main liaisons were the engineer Jānis Ozols ("Zars") and the railwayman Samuel Klevansky ("Maksim"). Bund was active during the 1905 Russian revolution, organizing demonstrations and fighting units.

In December 1918 the Latvia District Committee of the Bund began publishing the newspaper Undzer Tsayt ('Our Time'). As Latvia declared independence, the Bund held the position that Latvian independence should only be a temporary solution and that the area should eventually become part of a democratic socialist Russia. The Bund obtained two seats in the People's Council of Latvia, represented by A. Sherman and M. Papermeister. Moreover, the party obtained four seats in the provisional city council of Riga.

In 1919, a separate Latvian Bund party was formed.

=== In Lithuania ===
In Lithuania, the majority of the Bund had become Communists and at a conference held in Kaunas 18–19 April 1921 the Bund organization in Lithuania was declared dissolved and its members encouraged to join the Communist Party of Lithuania. The anti-Communist minority of the party in Lithuania abandoned Bundist politics altogether.

=== In the Central Rada of Ukraine ===
After the issuing of the First Universal of the Central Rada (Council) of Ukraine, the Southern Bureau of the Bund issued a statement rejecting the declaration of Ukrainian autonomy. The Bund feared that minorities, such as the Jews, would suffer if a centralized Ukrainian state emerged. Rather the Bund proposed that the Russian Provisional Government convene an all-Ukrainian territorial conference with representatives of both the Rada and non-Ukrainian forces, to establish an autonomous administration.

=== In the Belarusian People's Republic ===
The Bund was among the political parties that participated in the Rada (Council) of the Belarusian People's Republic, which declared independence in 1918 on territories occupied by the German Imperial Army. During the 24–25 March 1918 session of the Rada, the Bund argued against declaring independence from Russia. Bund member Mojżesz Gutman became a Minister without portfolio in the government of the newly created republic and drafted its constitution. The Bund later left the government bodies of the Belarusian People's Republic.

== Revolutions ==
=== 1905 ===
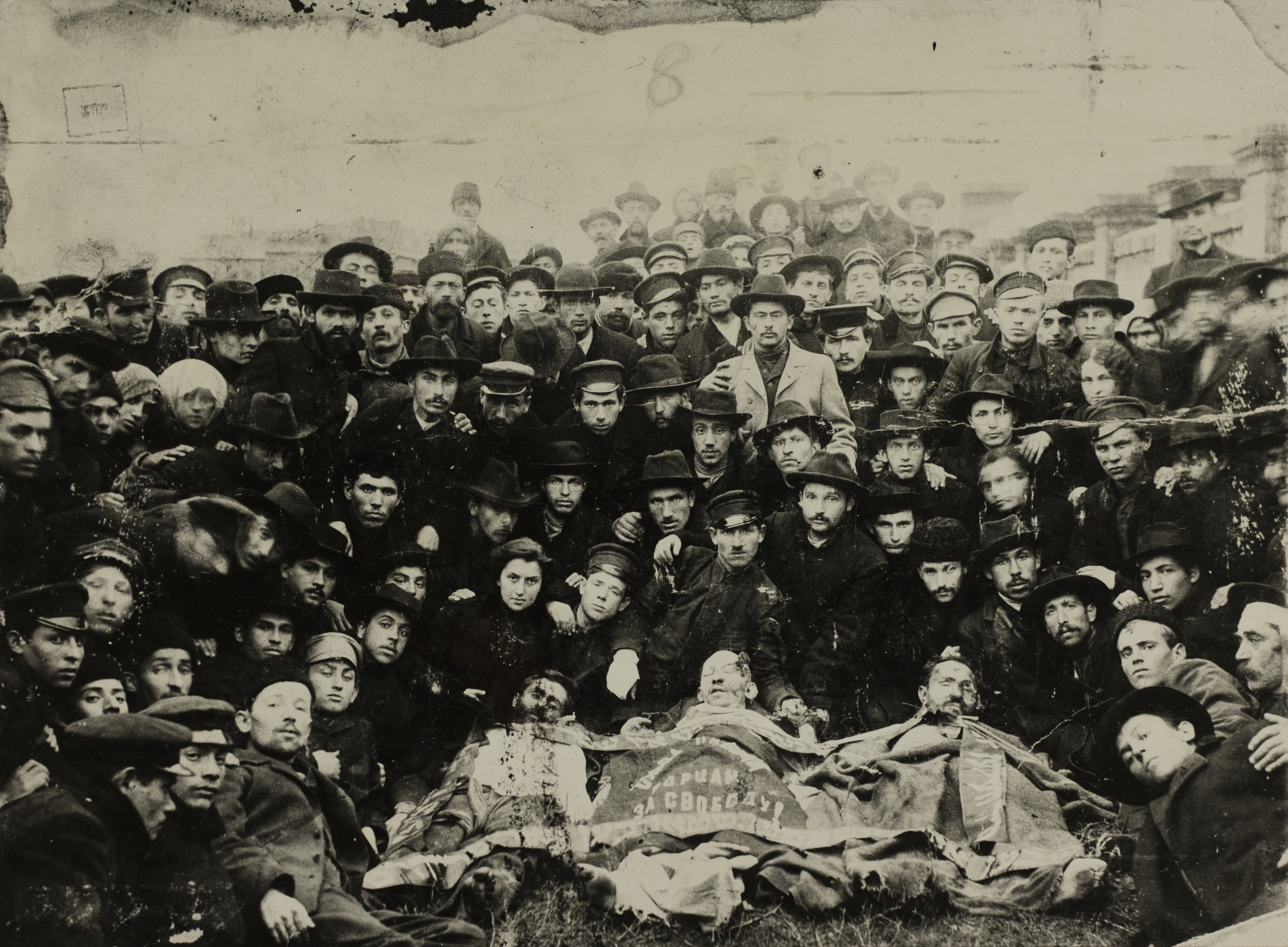
Members of the Bund with the bodies of their comrades, murdered during the Odessa pogrom in 1905

In February 1905, by a decision of the 6th Bund conference held in Dvinsk, a Polish District Committee (Yiddish: פוילישן ראיאן-קאמיטעט) was formed; gathering the local party branches in the areas of Congress Poland (covering 10 governorates, but not including the two main centres of Bundist activity in Poland: the cities of Warsaw and Łódz).

In the Polish areas of the Russian empire, the Bund was a leading force in the 1905 Revolution. At that time, the organization probably reached the height of its influence. It called for an improvement in living standards, a more democratic political system and the introduction of equal rights for Jews. During the following years, the Bund went into a period of decay. The party tried to concentrate on labour activism around 1909–1910 and led strikes in ten cities. The strikes resulted in a deepened backlash for the party, and as of 1910 there were legal Bundist trade unions in only four cities, Białystok, Vilnius, Riga and Łódź. Total membership in Bundist unions was around 1,500. At the time of the eighth party conference only nine local branches were represented (Riga, Vilnius, Białystok, Łódź, Bobruisk, Pinsk, Warsaw, Grodno and Dvinsk) with a combined membership of 609 (out of whom 404 were active).

The Bund formally rejoined the RSDLP when all of its faction reunited at the Fourth (Unification) Congress in Stockholm in April 1906, with the support of the Mensheviks, but the RSDLP remained fractured along ideological and ethnic lines. The Bund generally sided with the party's Menshevik faction led by Julius Martov and against the Bolshevik faction led by Vladimir Lenin during the factional struggles in the run-up to the Russian Revolution of 1917.

The 7th Bund conference was held in Lemberg (Galicia) 28 August – 8 September 1906. The main topic for debate was the relation with the Russian Social Democratic Labour Party. At the time, the Bund had 33,890 members and 274 functioning local organizations.

After the RSDLP finally split in 1912, the Bund became a federated part of the Russian Social Democratic Labour Party (Menshevik) (by this time the Mensheviks had accepted the idea of a federated party organization).

=== 1917 ===
The Bund was the only Jewish party that worked within the soviets. Like other socialist parties in Russia, the Bund welcomed the February Revolution of 1917, but it did not support the October Revolution in which the Bolsheviks seized power. Like Mensheviks and other non-Bolshevik parties, the Bund called for the convening of the Russian Constituent Assembly long demanded by all Social Democratic factions. The Bund's key leader in Petrograd during these months was Mikhail Liber, who was to be roundly denounced by Lenin. With the Russian Civil War and the increase in anti-Semitic pogroms by nationalists and Whites, the Bund was obliged to recognise the Soviet government and its militants fought in the Red Army in large numbers. At the time of the 1917 upheavals, Mikhail Liber was elected president of the Bund.

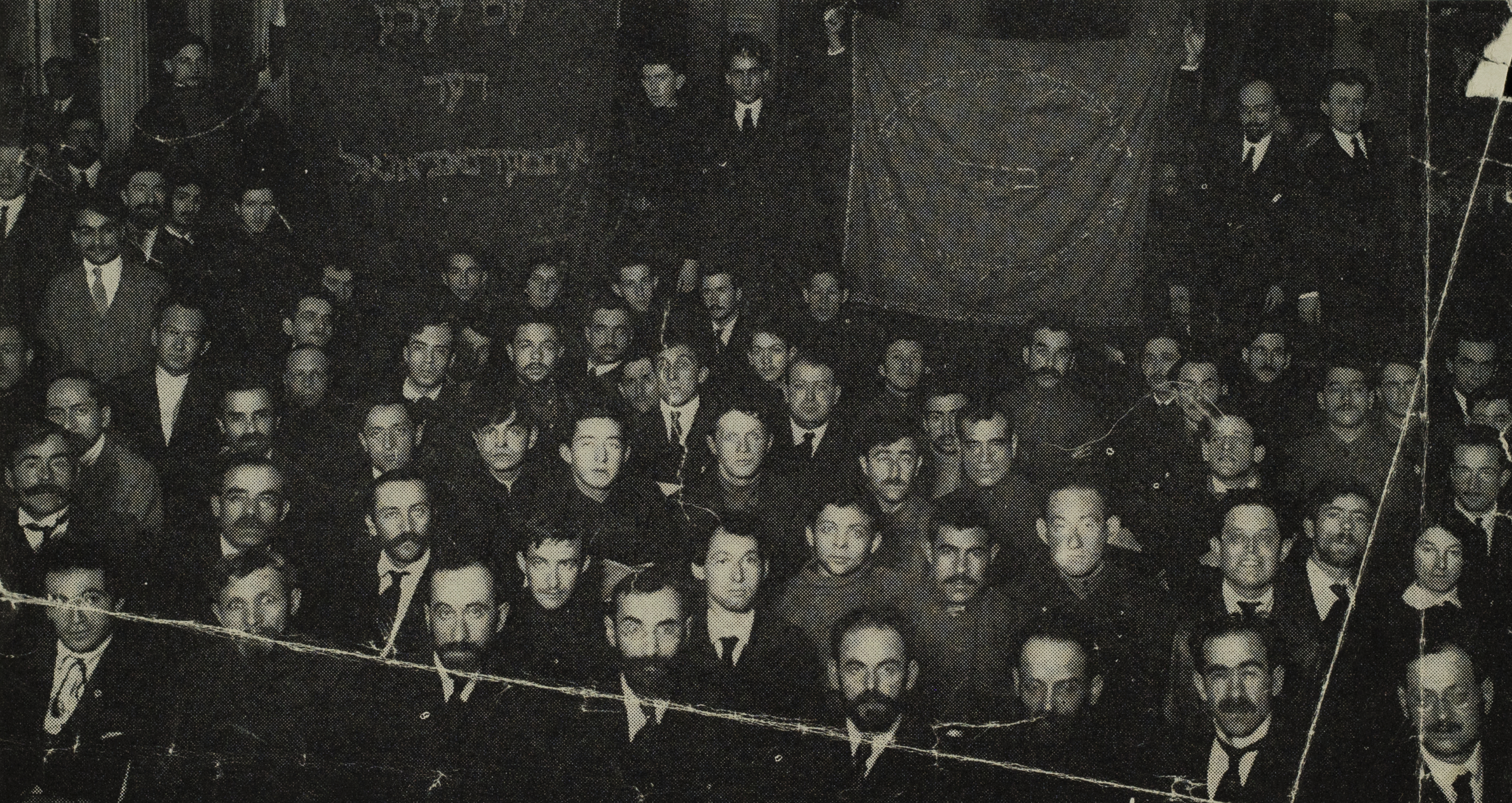
Central Committee of the Bund at the 10th Party Conference, 1917

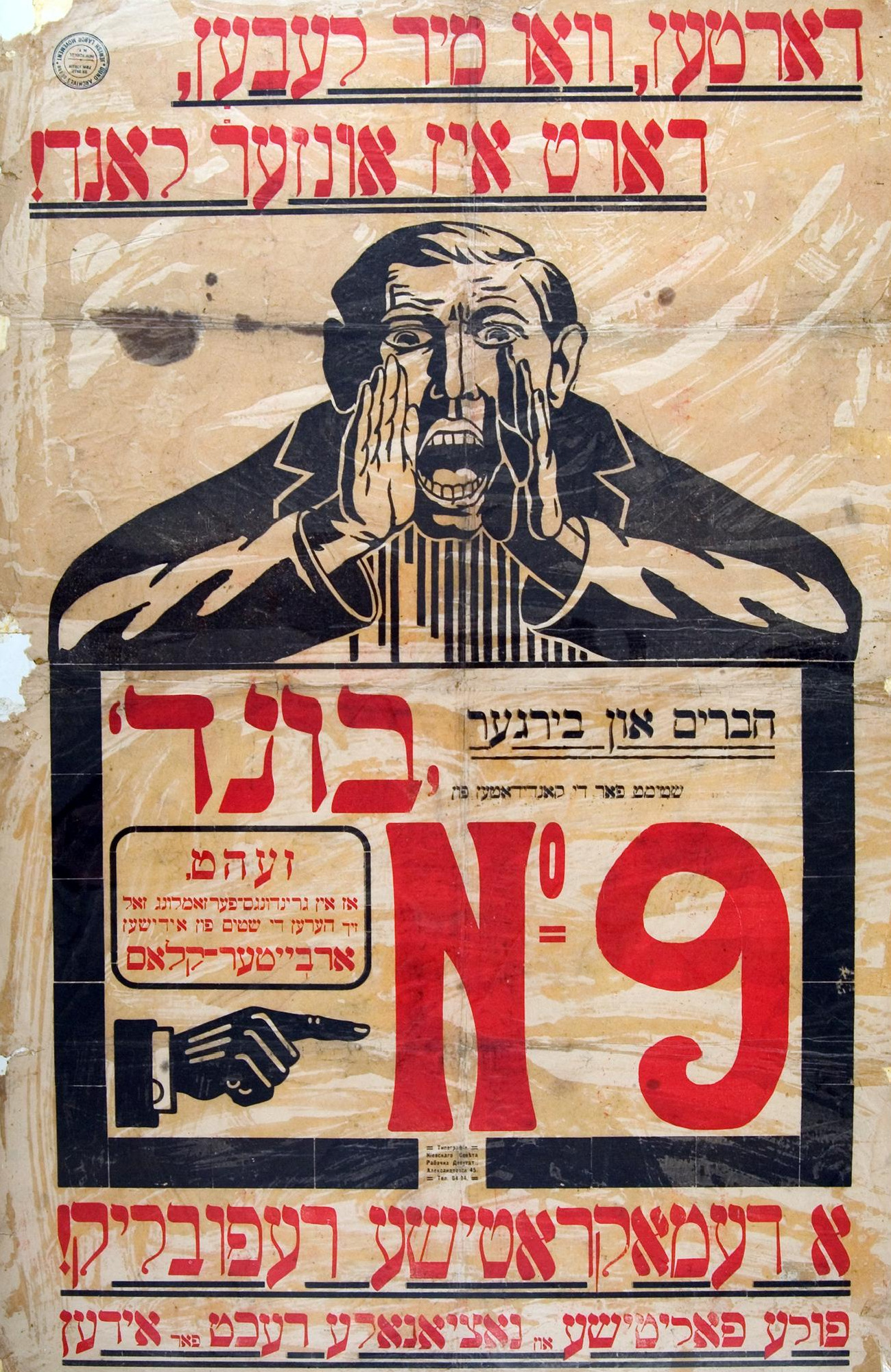
Election poster of the Bund hung in the Kiev electoral district, 1917. Heading: "Where we live, there is our country!" Inside frame: "Vote List 9, Bund". Bottom: "A democratic republic! Full national and equal political rights for Jews and other citizens!"

The 10th conference of the Bund was held in Petrograd 14–17 April 1917. It was the first Bund conference to be held openly inside Russia. 63 delegates had decisive voting rights at the conference, 20 had consultative votes. Isaiah Eisenstadt (Yudin), Arn Vaynshteyn (Rakhmiel), Mark Liber, Henrik Erlich and Moisei Rafes were the delegates of the Central Committee at the conference. The Brushworkers' Union had two delegates. The other delegates with decisive votes represented 37 cities across the country – three delegates each from Vitebsk, Minsk, Mohilev, Kiev, Kharkov, Petrograd (including Max Weinreich), Moscow (including Aleksandr Zolotarev), Yekaterinoslav, two delegates each from Odessa, Berdichev, Gomel, Kremenchuk, Nizhny Novgorod and one delegate each from Slutsk, Bobruisk, Gorodok, Nevel, Polotsk, Smolensk, Zhitomir, Mariupol, Bakhmut, Alexandrovsk, Simferopol, Rostov-on-Don, Kazan, Tambov, Samara, Baku, Tomsk/Novonikolayevsk, Saratov, Ufa, Novomoskovsk, Bogorodsk, Voronezh, and Rivne.

In May 1917, a new Central Committee of the Bund was formed, consisting of Goldman, Erlich, Medem, and Jeremiah Weinsthein. One Central Committee member, Medem, was in Poland at the time and could not travel to Saint Petersburg to meet with the rest of the committee.

Four Bund bureaus were represented as such among the 60 delegates to the May 1918 Menshevik Party conference: Moscow (Abramovich), Northern (Erlich), Western (Goldshtein, Melamed), and Occupied Lands (Aizenshtadt).

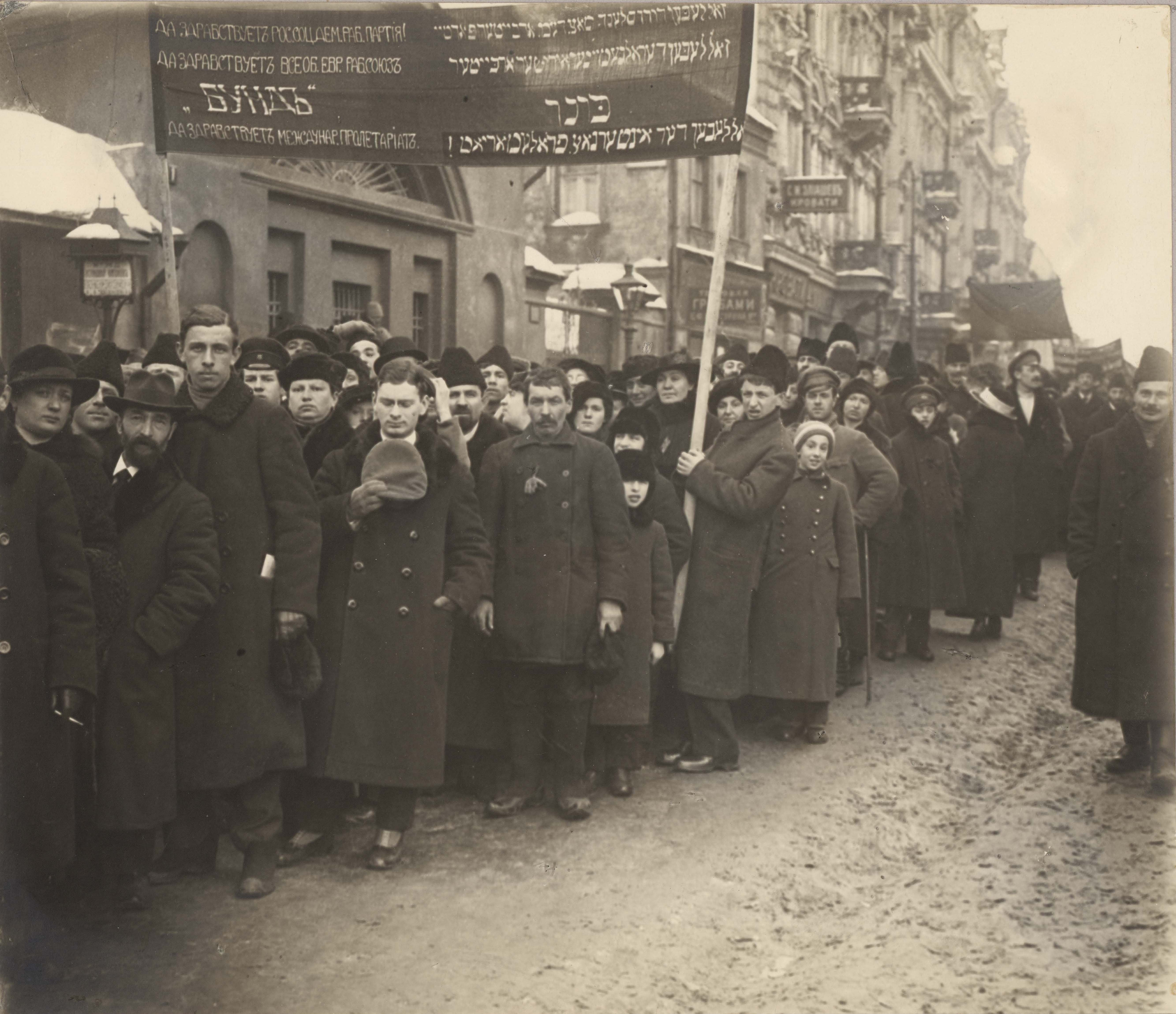
A Bundist socialist demonstration, 1917

The political changes at the time of the Russian revolution resulted in splits in the Bund. In Ukraine, Bund branches in cities like Bobruisk, Ekaterinoslav and Odessa had formed 'leftwing Bund groups' in late 1918. In February 1919, these groups (representing the majority in the Bund in Ukraine) adopted the name Communist Bund (Kombund), re-constituting themselves as an independent party. Moisei Rafes, who had been a leading figure of the Bund in Ukraine, became the leader of the Ukrainian Kombund. The Communist Bund supported the Soviet side in the Russian Civil War. Other members of the Bund (representing the minority in the Bund in Ukraine) at the end of 1918 formed the Social Democratic Bund (Bund-SD). Leaders of the Ukrainian Social Democratic Bund – Sore Foks, A. Litvak (see Litvak), David Petrovsky (Lipets) openly opposed the Communist ideology and policy of confiscation of property, usurpation of political power, arrests and persecution of political opponents.

The Bund also had elected officials at the local level. During the 1917 October Revolution and Russian Civil War, the mayor of the predominantly Jewish Ukrainian town of Berdychiv (53,728 inhabitants, 80% of whom were Jewish at the 1897 census) was a Bundist, David Petrovsky (Lipets).

== Armed resistance ==
The Bund undertook various forms of armed resistance against pogroms, and later, against Nazi Germany. Their efforts to create armed self-defense groups began in 1902, and intensified after the infamous Kishinev pogrom in 1903. At least in the early stages of the first Russian Revolution, the armed groups of the "Bund" were likely the strongest revolutionary force in Western Russia. The Bund’s militia had no special privileges over other party members and were held to a higher disciplinary standard, paying the same amount of dues as other party members.

In September 1942, in response to Nazi violence and deportation of Jews to extermination camps in Warsaw, Bundist youth group activists in occupied Poland joined left-wing Zionist youth in the Jewish Fighting Organization (Żydowska Organizacja Bojowa), or ŻOB, dedicated to the armed resistance against German powers. Turning to smuggling and donations from those with more valuables than most, the ŻOB amassed pistols, grenades, and Molotov cocktails for each of its 500 members by April 1943. The Polish Bundists found themselves in a precarious position organizing with left-wing Zionist youth associations as a core part of the ŻOB, and to a lesser degree, with right-wing Zionist youth who formed the Jewish Military Union (Żydowski Zwiazek Wojskowy), or ŻZW. With an estimated 400 members, the ŻZW had access to pistols, grenades, submachine guns, machine guns, and rifles.

On April 19, 1943, German forces attempted to enter the ghetto in a deportation operation but were met with armed resistance. The ŻOB and ŻZW planned to take their deaths into their own hands. Following 19 days of rebellion, the ghetto was set ablaze and resistance fighters forced out of cover. Jürgen Stroop, a Nazi commander, ordered the destruction of the Great Synagogue to symbolize German victory, marking the end of the uprising. This act of resistance, the largest single event of Jewish resistance against the Nazis during World War II, would later be known as the Warsaw Ghetto Uprising.

== Conferences ==
=== 4th conference ===
The 4th Bund conference was held in Białystok in April 1901. The main topic of debate of the 4th Bund conference was the expansion of the Bund into Ukraine and building alliances with existing Jewish labour groups there. The 4th conference reversed the line of the 3rd conference and adopted a line of demanding Jewish national autonomy.

=== 5th conference ===
The fifth conference of the Bund met in Zürich in June 1903. Thirty delegates took part in the proceedings in Zurich, representing the major city branches of the party and the Foreign Committee. Two issues dominated the debates; the upcoming congress of the RSDLP and the national question. During the discussions, there was a division between the older guard of the Foreign Committee (Kossovsky, Kremer and John (Yosef) Mill) and the younger generation represented by Medem, Liber and Raphael Abramovitch. The younger group wanted to stress the Jewish national character of the party. No compromise could be reached, and no resolution was adopted on the national question.

=== 11th conference ===
The 11th Bund conference was held in Minsk on 16–22 March 1919, with delegates from Russia, Belarus, Ukraine, Latvia and Lithuania. The conference was marked by a sharp division in the party, with a sector of the Bund being increasing in line with the Bolsheviks. There were 48 delegates with decisive voting rights and 19 with consultative vote. The delegates with decisive votes represented Minsk 5 delegates, Vilna 5, Gomel 5, Baranavichy 4, Bobruisk 2, Kiev 2, Yekaterinoslav 2, Kletsk 2, Nyasvizh 2 and one each from Kharkov, Riga, Moscow, Mohyliv, Konotop, Kurenets, Haradok, Shklow, Ufa/Samara, Smolensk, Rechytsa, Penza, Igumen, Mozyr, Pukhavichy, Ivianiec, Voronezh, Vitebsk and Dvinsk.

=== 12th conference ===
The remainder Bund in Russia its 12th conference on 12–19 April 1920 in Gomel, where the majority adopted a Communist position and the anti Bolshevik minority reconstituted themselves as separate party (the Bund (S.D.)).

The fourteen point of the resolution "On the Present Situation and the Tasks of Our Party" of the Gomel conference stated that

Summing up the experience of the last year, the Twelfth Conference of the Bund finds:

1. that the Bund, in principle, had adopted the communist platform since the Eleventh Conference,
2. that the Programme of the Communist Party, which is also the programme of the Soviet government, corresponds with the fundamental platform of the Bund,
3. that a ’united socialist front’ with principled opponents of Soviet power, who draw a line between the proletariat and its government, is impossible,
4. that the moment has come when the Bund can relinquish its official oppositional stand and take upon itself responsibility for the Soviet government's policy.

The resolution on organisational questions stated that:

The logical consequence of the political stand adopted by the Bund is the latter's entry into the [Russian Communist Party] on the same basis as the Bund's membership of the R.S.D.L.P.. The conference authorised the C.C. of the Bund to see to it, as an essential condition, that the Bund preserve within the R.C.P. the status of an autonomous organisation of the Jewish proletariat.

== Unity talks and dissolution ==
Esther Frumkin and Aron Isaakovich (Rakhmiel) Vainsthein were the key leaders of the Communist Bund 1920–1921. Communist Bund organs, such as Der Veker, were published irregularly in Belarus.

Following the Gomel Conference, a process of negotiations for a merger between the Communist Party and the Communist Bund took place. As noted above, the Communist Bund argued that it should be affiliated as an autonomous organization within the Communist Party on the same terms as the Bund had joined the Russian Social Democratic Labour Party in 1903. Furthermore, the Bund demanded that a commission be set up to discuss the terms of the merger. The Communist Party ceded to this request and a 7-member commission was formed (3 Communist Party representatives, 3 Bund representatives and 1 Comintern representative as arbiter). On 6 May 1920, the Politburo of the Central Committee of the Russian Communist Party (bolshevik) discussed the question of "The Conditions for the Bund's Admission to Membership of the R.C.P." and resolved "that Kamenev, Stalin and Preobrazhensky be authorised to receive the representatives of the Bund and hear their proposals". Within the Communist Party, its Jewish section (Yevsektsiya) strongly opposed the Bund and argued against allowing the Bund to form an autonomous body within the party.

On 9 June 1920, the Communist faction of the Fareynikhte party merged into the Communist Bund.

Eventually the Comintern arbiter in the unity commission was convinced by the Yevsektsiya argumentation, and the Comintern ordered the Bund to dissolve itself. At an Extraordinary All-Russian Bundist Conference, held in Minsk on 5 March 1921, the delegates representing some 3,000 party members debated disbanding the Communist Bund. Vainsthein spoke in favour of disbanding the Communist Bund and merging with the Communist Party. Perel represented the minority view, arguing that the Bund should be retained as a separate party. 47 delegates voted against Perel's proposal, 23 delegates abstained from voting. In April 1921 the Communist International called on all Bundists to join the Communist Party. The Communist Bund was subsequently disbanded. In Belarus, the Communist Party of Byelorussia agreed to provide automatic party membership to any Bundist that joined the party, and one Bundist was included in the CP(b)B Central Bureau and two Bundists in CP(b)B District Committees. Symbolically marking the merger, a ceremony was held in a theatre in Minsk on 19 April 1921, where Bundists handed over their banners to the CP(b)B. Der Veker became the organ of the Yevsektsiya (Jewish section of the Communist Party) in the Byelorussian SSR. After their party was dissolved, many former members of the Communist Bund joined the RCP(b) as individuals.

== Legacy ==
Around 1923, the remnants of the Bund (S.D.) had ceased to function in Soviet Russia. Many former Bundists, like Mikhail Liber and David Petrovsky, perished during Stalin's purges in the 1930s. The Polish Bundists continued their activities until 1948. During the latter half of the 20th century the Bundist legacy was represented through the International Jewish Labor Bund, a federation of local Bundist groups around the world. A leader of the Warsaw Ghetto Uprising of 1943 was Bundist Marek Edelman.

In West Belarus, areas that came under Polish rule between the two world wars, the remnants of the Russian Bund eventually merged into the Polish Bund, while many activists chose to join the Polish Communist Party.

=== Former Bundists who became high level officials in the USSR ===
- Israel Moiseevich Leplevsky (1894–1938), Bundist in 1904–1907, Minister ("People's Commissar") of Internal Affairs of the Ukrainian Soviet Socialist Republic (1937–1938)
- Moisei Leibovits Ruhymovych (1889–1939), Bundist in 1904–1913, Minister ("People's Commissar") for military affairs of the Donetsk-Krivoy Rog Soviet Republic (1917–1918) and Minister ("People's Commissar") for Defense Industry of the USSR (1936–1937)
- David Petrovsky (1886–1937), Bundist in 1902–1919, a Chief of the General Directorate of military educational institutions (GUVUZ) of the Red Army (1920–1924), a member of the Presidium of the Executive Committee of the Communist International (1924–1929), a member of the Presidium to the Supreme Soviet of the National Economy (1929–1932), a Chief of the Department of higher and secondary technical educational institutions (GLAVVTUZ) in the Ministry (People's Commissariat) of Soviet Heavy Industry (1932–1937).

=== The Bundists in North America ===
Among the exiled Bundists who went on with Socialist politics in America was Baruch Charney Vladeck (1886–1938), elected to the New York Board of Aldermen as a Socialist in 1917, defeated in 1921 but re-elected in 1937 to the newly formed New York City Council running on the American Labor Party ticket. He was also the manager of The Jewish Daily Forward from 1918 till his death.

Moishe Lewis (1888–1950) was a Bundist leader in his Polish (now Belarusian) hometown Svislosz before he emigrated to Canada in 1922. He was the father of David Lewis (1909–1981), a leader of the New Democratic Party in Canada.

The American Labour leader David Dubinsky (1892–1982), though never formally a member of the party, had joined the bakers' union, which was controlled by the Bund, and was elected assistant secretary within the union by 1906. He made his way to the United States in 1911. He later became a member of the Socialist Party of America, helped found the American Labor Party in 1936 and was from 1932 till 1966 the leader of the International Ladies' Garment Workers' Union.

Between 1913 and 1917, working under the name Max Goldfarb, David Petrovsky (1886–1937) was a member of the Central Committee of the Jewish Socialist Federation of America, a member of the Socialist Party of America, and the labor editor of The Forward.

Sara Szweber (1875–1966) was active in the Bund émigré community and took part in Bund's fourth World Congress at the age of ninety.

== See also ==
- Armenian Social-Democratic Workers Organization – an Armenian organization inspired by the Bund
- The Workers Circle – an American organization inspired by the Bund
