= 1918 Provisional Jewish National Assembly election in Ukraine =

- August 11–13, 1918
- All 125 members of the Provisional Jewish National Assembly
Party	Leader	Vote %	Seats	+/–
General Zionists	Menachem Ussishkin		42	
General Jewish Labour Bund	Moisei Rafes		23	
Akhdut	Rabbi Yakov Aleshkovsky		19	
Tze'irei Zion	Eliezer Kaplan		14	
Fareynikte	Moishe Zilberfarb		12	
Poale Zion	Abraham Revutsky		11	
Folkspartey	Wolf Latsky		4	
This lists parties that won seats. See the complete results below.

Elections to the Provisional Jewish National Assembly (Yiddish: צייטווייליגע יידישע נאציאנאלע פארזאמלונג), often referred to as the Pre-Parliament (Yiddish: פארפארלאמענט, Farparlament), were held in Ukraine during the Hetmanate regime in the summer of 1918. The election was primarily fought between two blocs – a bloc of socialist parties and the diaspora nationalist Folkspartey and an alliance between Zionist and Orthodox forces. The former had been in control of the state institutions of Jewish autonomy (Ministry of Jewish Affairs, National Council) during the Central Rada period, but the Provisional Jewish National Assembly election resulted in a victory for the Zionist-clerical camp.

== Background ==
By December 1917 the Jewish political parties in Ukraine were making plans for the convening of a Provisional Jewish National Assembly. A National Council (Yiddish: נאציאנאל-ראט) had been formed in October 1917 under the supervision of the Vice Secretary for Jewish Affairs. Between the Jewish parties a bitter controversy emerged over representation in the National Council. As a non-elected body, the National Council was convened on the principle of revolutionary democracy with equal representation of each party. When the National Council was convened for its first meeting on October 1, 1917 it had four representatives each from five political parties – the General Jewish Labour Bund, the Jewish Social Democratic Labour Party (Poalei Zion), the United Jewish Socialist Workers Party (Fareynikte), the Folkspartey and the Zionists. The Orthodox Akhdut party was excluded from the National Council. At the opening session of the National Council, the Zionist delegate A. Kaplan denounced the institution as one-sided and that it functioned merely as a commission of the Ukrainian government. He furthermore declared that the Zionists would only attend meetings of the National Council for information purposes. Responding to the accusation, the Poale Zion leader Ber Borochov stated that in the prevailing chaotic situation it was not feasible to follow all '613 commandments' of democracy. During the period of the Zionist boycott and after the passing of legislation on Jewish national-personal autonomy in December 1917 (paving the way for formal recognition of kehilot, Jewish communities), the National Council drafted a plan to convene a Provisional Jewish National Assembly with 75 delegates elected from the kehilot and 50 delegates representing the political parties (10 representatives each).

Only in April 1918, after Wolf Latsky had replaced Moishe Zilberfarb as Minister for Jewish Affairs, did the Zionists join the National Council. Latsky had been a compromise candidate, whose main task was to manage the Ministry until the Provisional Jewish National Assembly would be constituted. One of the preconditions of the Zionists to join the National Council was that all of the delegates of the Provisional Jewish National Assembly would be elected from the kehilot (without any guaranteed representation for political parties). Moreover the Zionists demanded that a two-thirds majority would be required to amend the Constitution of the Provisional Jewish National Assembly. After reaching the April 1918 compromise on elections to the Provisional Jewish National Assembly there was an environment of cooperation and harmony between the Jewish parties, which would last until the assembly was finally convened in November the same year.

== Voting ==
Ahead of the elections, two blocs crystalized – a socialist-diaspora nationalist bloc and a Zionist-clerical bloc. The latter was derogatorily referred to as the 'Blue-Black bloc'. On July 4, 1918 the National Council appointed a Central Election Bureau with four members from each of the two camps. The Central Election Bureau in turn elected a two-member secretariat, consisting of one Zionist and one Bundist. On July 9, 1918 the Hetmanate regime annulled the law on national-personal autonomy and abolished the Ministry of Jewish Affairs. After some negotiations with a Jewish delegation, the Hetmanate regime agreed to allow the Provisional Jewish National Assembly election to proceed. The administration of the Central Election Bureau and its secretariat were transferred to the Jewish council of Kiev.

The Central Election Bureau initially planned holding the election to the Provisional Jewish National Assembly on July 14–16, 1918, but the polls were then postponed to July 21–23, 1918. The Central Election Bureau continued working for the preparations for the elections. However, the planned election dates would coincide with the All-Ukrainian Railway Strike. Thus the election was delayed again, and held August 11–13, 1918.

Voting took place in 168 out of the 195 officially recognized kehilot. Jews above the age of 20 were allowed to vote. Voters would elect kehilot leaders, who in turn would elect the delegates to the Provisional Jewish National Assembly. Some 270,000 people cast their ballots in the election.

== Result ==
On October 28 the Central Election Bureau, in its penultimate meeting, ratified the results from 161 kehilot, announcing the election of 3,565 kehilot councilors. The polls in 7 kehilot were not ratified. Roughly 77% of the votes went to the lists of political parties, 19% to non-party lists (such as youth clubs, women's groups, etc.) and 4% went to bloc lists.

Out of the 209,128 votes cast for political parties, the Algemeine (General Zionist) list obtained 70,584 votes, Tseirei Tsion obtained 23,851 votes and Poale Tsion 18,416 votes. The 125 seats in the Provisional Jewish National Council were distributed as follows; General Zionists 42 seats, the Bund 23 seats, Akhdut 19 seats, Tze'irei Zion 14 seats, Fareynikte 12 seats, Poale Zion 11 seats and Folkspartey 4 seats. Thus there was a majority for the Zionist-clerical bloc (75 seats) against 50 seats of the socialist-diaspora nationalist bloc. The socialists had been weakened as they had lost their positions the Central Rada and other government institutions after the coup that established the Hetmanate government.

== Aftermath ==
The Provisional Jewish National Assembly held its first, and only, session November 3–10, 1918. At the opening of its session the months of harmony between Jewish parties ended, as disputes erupted over whether to use Yiddish or Hebrew. The Bund and Fareynikte delegates left the hall in protest over the use of Hebrew. A Presidium was formed, without socialist participation, consisting of Menachem Ussishkin (General Zionist), Eliezer Kaplan (Tze'irei Zion), Rabbi Yakov Aleshkovsky (Akhdut) and Wolf Latsky (Folkspartey). Ussishkin was elected chairman of the Provisional Jewish National Assembly.

The Provisional Jewish National Assembly elected two leading bodies, a 25-member committee and a 12-member Executive (National Secretariat). In practice the National Secretariat would only have seven members. The socialists, denouncing the lack of sufficient representation, boycotted the executive organs of the Provisional Jewish National Assembly.
