= Autonomism (political doctrine) =

Acquiring or preserving political autonomy

Autonomism is a political doctrine which supports acquiring or preserving political autonomy of a nation or a region. It is not necessarily opposed to federalism, and sovereignism necessarily implies autonomism, but not vice versa.

Examples of autonomist parties include the Yidishe Folkspartay (lit. "Jewish People's Party") (Russian Empire/Poland/Lithuania); Union Nationale, Action démocratique du Québec, and its successor Coalition Avenir Québec (Quebec), and recent (2018) Freedom Conservative Party of Alberta (Alberta), all in Canada; New Macau Association in China (Macau); Parti progressiste martiniquais (Martinique) in France; Lega Nord in Italy (Northern Italy); Popular Democratic Party in the United States (Puerto Rico); and the Yorkshire Party in the United Kingdom (Yorkshire).

== Canada ==
=== Alberta ===
In Alberta, the Freedom Conservative Party of Alberta (FCPoA), which was formerly known as Alberta First Party (AFP), Western Freedom Party (WFP), and Separation Party (SP), replaced the party's old ideology Albertan separatism to support promoting Albertan autonomy like Quebec's counterparts, instead as part of the new another changes under then elected Derek Fildebrandt's leadership.

In 2022, the Alberta provincial government passed the Alberta Sovereignty Within a United Canada Act.

=== Quebec ===
Autonomism is a policy defended by four Quebec political parties, the Union Nationale (UN), the Action démocratique du Québec (ADQ), its successor Coalition Avenir Québec (CAQ) and the Équipe Autonomiste (EA), are provincial parties that aim to obtain certain federal capacities and to give the title of autonomous state to the province.

=== Saskatchewan ===
The provincial government of Saskatchewan has called for greater provincial autonomy, with premier Scott Moe calling for a "New Deal with Canada" and referring to Saskatchewan as a "nation within a nation" when discussing a desire for more control over taxation, immigration, and policing. The third party Saskatchewan United Party also supports provincial autonomy.

In 2022, the Saskatchewan provincial government issued a white paper on its stance against "federal intrusion" and in 2023 passed Saskatchewan First Act.

== Jewry in the Russian Empire ==
Jewish Autonomism was a non-Zionist political movement and ideology that emerged in the Russian and Austro-Hungarian empires, before spreading throughout Eastern Europe in the late 19th and early 20th century. In the late 19th century, Jewish Autonomism was seen "together with Zionism [as] the most important political expression of the Jewish people in the modern era." One of its first and major proponents was the historian and activist Simon Dubnow. Jewish Autonomism is often referred to as "Dubnovism" or "folkism".

The Autonomists believed that the future survival of the Jews as a nation depends on their spiritual and cultural strength, in developing "spiritual nationhood" and in viability of Jewish diaspora as long as Jewish communities maintain self-rule and rejected assimilation. Autonomists often stressed the vitality of modern Yiddish culture. Various concepts of the Autonomism were adopted in the platforms of the Folkspartei, the Sejmists, and socialist Jewish parties such as the Bund.

== Romania ==
The Székely autonomy movement is supported by local parties representing the Hungarian community and by most of the political parties in Hungary.

== Switzerland ==
The 26 cantons of Switzerland demonstrate autonomism in a federal state. The Swiss Federal Constitution declares the cantons to be sovereign to the extent that it is not limited by federal law. The cantons also retain all powers and competencies not delegated to the federal government by the Constitution.

== See also ==
- Localism in Hong Kong
- Regionalism (politics)
- List of active autonomist movements in Europe
- List of active autonomist movements in Asia
