= Der nayer veg =

Yiddish language weekly newspaper

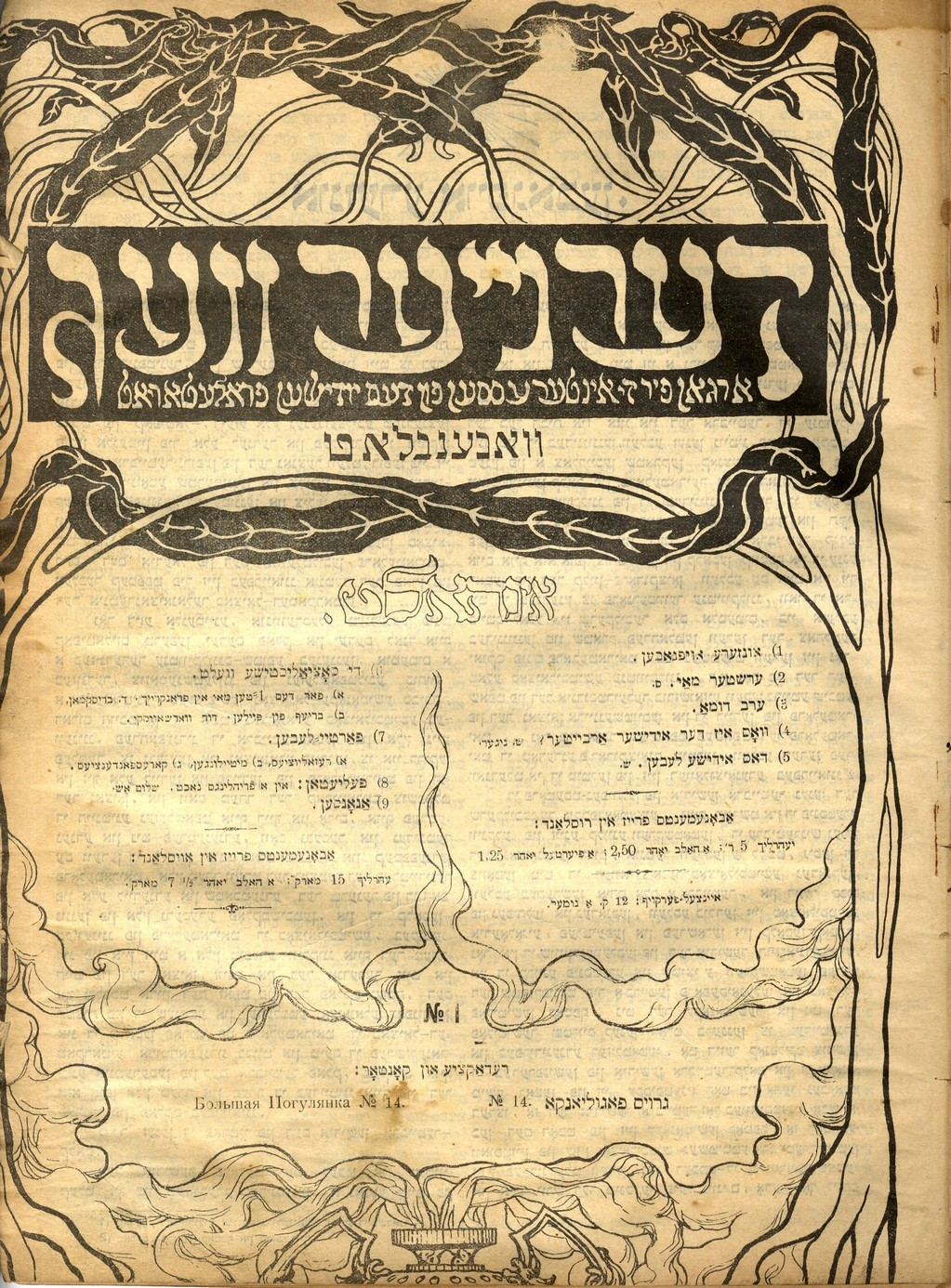
- First issue of Der nayer veg
- Publisher: Central Committee of the Zionist Socialist Workers Party
- Editor: Moishe Litvakov
- Founded: May 11, 1906
- Ceased publication: January 25, 1907
- Political alignment: Territorialism
- City: Vilna
- Country: Russia
- Circulation: 7,000 (as of 1906)

Der nayer veg (Yiddish: דער נייער וועג, lit. 'The New Path') was a Yiddish language weekly newspaper published from Vilna, Russia between May 11 [O.S. April 28] 1906, and January 25 [O.S. January 12] 1907. It was the central party organ of the Zionist Socialist Workers Party. It replaced the previous organ Der yidisher proletar ('The Jewish Proletarian'). Officially the editor-publisher of the newspaper was R.Z. Zibel, but in reality the editorship was managed by Moyshe Litvakov. The newspaper had a circulation of some 7,000 copies.

== Content ==
Per Trachtenberg (2008) the newspaper "contained some of the first attempts to apply critical scholarly methods to the study of the Yiddish language, literature, and the material conditions of Russian Jewry in the Yiddish language, and [was, along with the Jewish Socialist organ Di folksshtime,] important precursors to the scholarly work that would appear in the post-1905 revolutionary period". The editors and writers of the respective party organs Der nayer veg and Di folksshtime argued for consolidation of Jewish cultural identity as a counter-weight to assimilation. Whilst Der nayer veg functioned as a party organ with news and reports on party activities, it also carried literary criticism authored by Shmuel Niger, scholarly economic analysis by Jacob Lestschinsky and works of fictional literature authored by I. L. Peretz, David Frischmann, Sholem Asch, Einhorn, Peretz Hirschbein, etc. The publication carried debates between Nachman Syrkin and Litvakov over the relation between territorialism and economic factors. Another contributor was W. Bertoldi.

Der nayer veg was closed down by government authorities. In total 25 issues of Der nayer veg were published. Der nayer veg was succeeded by Dos vort ('The Word') in May 1907.
