= Non-Zionism =

Jews supporting Jewish settlement in Palestine but not willing to immigrate

Non-Zionism is the political stance of Jews who are "willing to help support Jewish settlement in Palestine ... but will not come on aliyah," writes the scholar David Polish.

The trend began in the United States in the first few decades of the 20th century when "an increasingly large section of Americanized Jewish opinion began to shift away from anti-Zionism ... either to pro-Zionism or non-Zionism. ... The non-Zionists were willing to offer the diaspora Jews a Jewish homeland fiscal and diplomatic counsel, not for their own benefit or spiritual comfort but for those Jews who chose to reside there."

== Difference from anti-Zionists ==
Yoram Dinstein gave this distinction: "There is a marked difference between non-Zionism and anti-Zionism. A non-Zionist may challenge the theoretical underpinning of the concept of an 'ingathering of the exiles' in an independent Jewish State. If Jewish, he or she will not choose to live in Israel, nor will he approve or reject the notion of other Jews living there in the Jewish State of Israel ... but anti-Zionists do not find it sufficient to be dissatisfied with a decision made and implemented a long time ago. They are not content with a critical assessment of the situation confined to an historical (and, accordingly, a theoretical) framework. Not merely do they have an adverse opinion about the establishment of Israel in the past, but they contest the legitimacy of Israel as a State in the present time and the future."

== Contemporary definitions ==
=== Non-position ===
Non-Zionism has also been defined in terms of a non-position on Zionism. Anthony Frosh has defined a non-Zionist Jew as a Jew "who does not have any particular political relationship (positive or negative) with the State of Israel, or at least little more of a relationship than they would have with some other 3rd party state."

=== Haredi non-Zionism ===
Generally, those groups of Ashkenazi (Western) Haredi Jews who participate in the Israeli government but do not believe in religious Zionism are known as "non-Zionists". The most prominent non-Zionist Haredi group is Agudath Israel. This is in contrast to the religious Zionist Mizrachi party (which believed the State of Israel to be the beginning of the redemption); and also in contrast to the anti-Zionist Haredi groups, such as Satmar, Neturei Karta, and Edah HaChareidis, that openly oppose Zionism and have little to no interaction with the State of Israel and no representation in its government. Unlike the older definition, many live in the State of Israel. They tend to be extremely pro-Israel politically, as can be seen in such publications as Mishpacha and Hamodia. Sephardi Haredi Jews may refer to themselves as Zionist.

=== Simon Dubnow's Non-Zionism, or "Folkism" ===
Simon Dubnow was a Russian-Jewish philosopher and historian of Jewish history, especially Russian and Polish Jewish history. Dubnow himself was somewhat ambivalent towards Zionism as a political ideology, calling it "a beautiful, messianic dream" and seeing the creation of a Jewish state in Palestine as improbable. Nonetheless, Dubnow was adamantly opposed to assimilation. In his book, Weltgeschichte des jüdischen volkes, Dubnow differentiates between a political and spiritual nation, arguing that Jewish nationalism was not inherently violent, and promoting the ideal of a universal Jewish humanism, or the "Jewish world-nation," as the core of his ideal. In seeking this ideal, the Jewish diaspora would aspire for a non-territorial autonomous status. This philosophy became known as "Jewish Autonomism," or "Folkism" and was eventually adopted by the Folkspartei ("Jewish People's Party" in English), which Dubnow himself helped found, and the Bund, a socialist Jewish labor movement. For him, any Jewish national movement should not to have a flag or a military. Nonetheless, he did gradually warm up to some aspects of Ahad Ha'am's vision of Cultural Zionism later in his life and viewed a return to Zion as fitting for some Jews, albeit not for all. Dubnow would never see the birth of the State of Israel, as he was murdered on December 8, 1941 during the march to the Rumbula forest, where the Nazi Wehrmacht and collaborators killed 25,000 Jews in the Rumbula massacre. Nonetheless, Dubnow's histories and promotion of Jewish culture and Jewish political autonomy still earn him praise to this day within many intellectual circles.

== Bibliography ==
- Gideon Shimoni, From Anti-Zionism to Non-Zionism in Anglo Jewry, 1917–1937, Jewish Journal of Sociology, 28 (1986), pp.19–48
- Gideon Shimoni, The Non-Zionists in Anglo Jewry, 1937–1948.
- Stuart E. Knee, “Jewish Non-Zionism in America and Palestine Commitment 1917-1941,” Jewish Social Studies 39, no. 3 (1977): 209–26.
