= Jewish political movements =

Jewish political movements refer to the organized efforts of Jews to build their own political parties or otherwise represent their interest in politics outside the Jewish community. From the time of the siege of Jerusalem by the Romans to the foundation of Israel, the Jewish people had no sovereign territory and were largely denied equal rights in the lands in which they lived. Thus, until the emancipation of the Jews in the 19th century, almost all Jewish political struggles were internal, and dealt primarily with either religious issues or local community concerns. (See Judaism and politics.)

== Birth of Jewish political movements ==
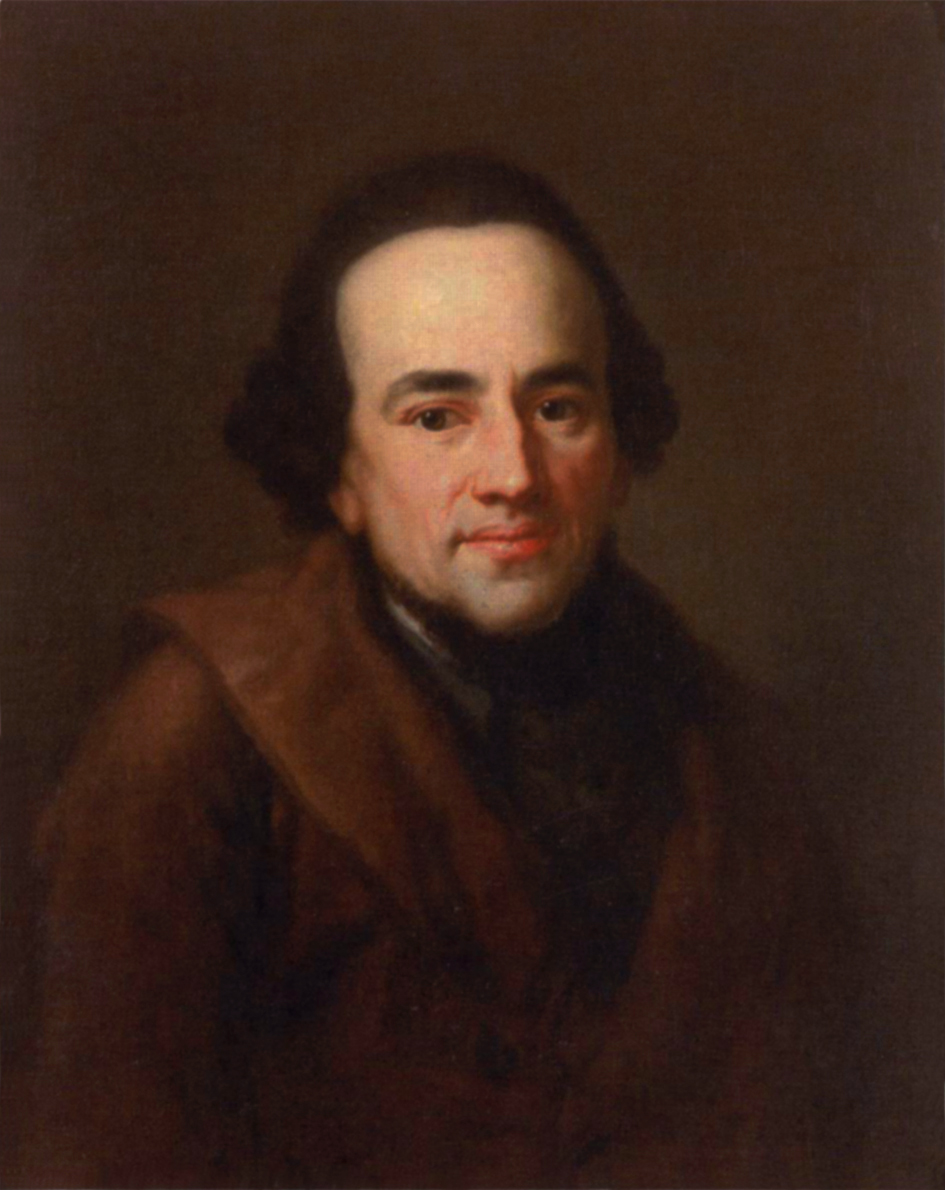
Moses Mendelssohn, the founder of the Haskalah movement

Since Jews were excluded as outsiders throughout Europe, they were mostly shut out of politics or any sort of participation in the wider political and social sphere of the nations in which they were involved until the Enlightenment, and its Jewish counterpart, Haskalah, made popular movements possible. As long as the Jews lived in segregated communities, and as long as all avenues of social intercourse with their gentile neighbors were closed to them, the rabbi was the most influential member of the Jewish community. In addition to being a religious scholar and clergy, a rabbi also acted as a civil judge in all cases in which both parties were Jews. Rabbis sometimes had other important administrative powers, together with the community elders. The rabbinate was the highest aim of many Jewish boys, and the study of the Torah (first five books of the Bible) and the Talmud was the means of obtaining that coveted position, or one of many other important communal distinctions. Haskalah followers advocated "coming out of the ghetto", not just physically but also mentally and spiritually. The example of Moses Mendelssohn (1729–1786), a Prussian Jew and grandfather of the composer Felix Mendelssohn, served to lead this movement. Mendelssohn's extraordinary success as a popular philosopher and man of letters revealed hitherto unsuspected possibilities of integration and acceptance of Jews among non-Jews.

The changes caused by the Haskalah movement coincided with rising revolutionary movements throughout Europe. Despite these movements, only France, Britain, and the Netherlands had granted the Jews in their countries equal rights with gentiles after the French Revolution in 1796. Elsewhere in Europe, especially where Jews were most concentrated in Central and Eastern Europe, Jews were not granted equal rights. It was in the revolutionary atmosphere of the mid-19th century that the first true Jewish political movements would take place.

== Emancipation movements ==
During the early stages of Jewish emancipation movements, Jews were simply part of the general effort to achieve freedom and rights that drove popular uprisings like the Revolutions of 1848. Jewish statesmen and intellectuals like Heinrich Heine, Johann Jacoby, Gabriel Riesser, Berr Isaac Berr, and Lionel Nathan Rothschild were active with the general movement towards liberty and political freedom.

Still, in the face of persistent antisemitic incidents like the Damascus Blood Libel of 1840, and the failure of many states to emancipate the Jews, Jewish organizations started to form in order to push for the emancipation and protection of Jews. The Board of Deputies of British Jews under Moses Montefiore, the Central Consistory of Paris, and the Alliance Israelite Universelle founded by Adolphe Crémieux, all began working to assure the freedom of the Jews throughout the middle of the 19th century.

== Socialist and Labor movements ==
Frustration with the slow pace of Jewish acceptance into European society, and a revolutionary utopianism, led to a growing interest in proto-socialist and communist movements, especially as early socialist leaders, like Saint-Simon, preached the emancipation of the Jews. Moses Hess played a role in introducing Karl Marx (who was descended from a long line of rabbis) and Friedrich Engels to historical materialism. The Jewish Ferdinand Lassalle, founded the first actual workers' party in Germany, the General German Workers' Association (which ultimately merged with other parties to become the Social Democratic Party of Germany) and made Jewish emancipation one of his goals.

The more intellectual socialist movements of the Jews in Western Europe never gathered steam as emancipation took hold. In Eastern Europe and Russia, however, the Bund – the General Jewish Labor Union – founded in 1897, became a key force in organizing Jews, and, at least initially, the major opponent of another Jewish political movement of the time, Zionism. There were other Jewish socialist parties in Russia, like the (territorialist) Zionist Socialist Workers Party and the Jewish Socialist Workers Party, which united their destinies in 1917 as the United Jewish Socialist Workers Party. Another left-wing Russian Jewish party was the Jewish Social Democratic Labour Party (Poalei Zion).

== Zionist movements ==
The aim of Zionism was to set up a secular state in the vicinity of the Biblical Land of Israel. Zionism, or the idea of a restored national homeland and common identity for the Jews, had already started to take shape by the mid-19th century, with Jewish thinkers such as Moses Hess whose 1862 work Rome and Jerusalem; The Last National Question argued for the Jews to settle in Palestine as a means of settling the national question. Hess proposed a socialist state in which the Jews would become agrarianised through a process of "redemption of the soil" which would transform the Jewish community into a "true" nation, in that Jews would occupy the productive layers of society rather than being an intermediary non-productive merchant class, which is how he perceived Jews in Europe. Hess, along with later thinkers such as Nahum Syrkin and Ber Borochov, is considered a founder of Socialist Zionism and Labour Zionism and one of the intellectual forebears of the kibbutz movement. Others like Rabbi Zvi Kalischer viewed a return to the Jewish homeland as the fulfillment of biblical prophecy through natural means.

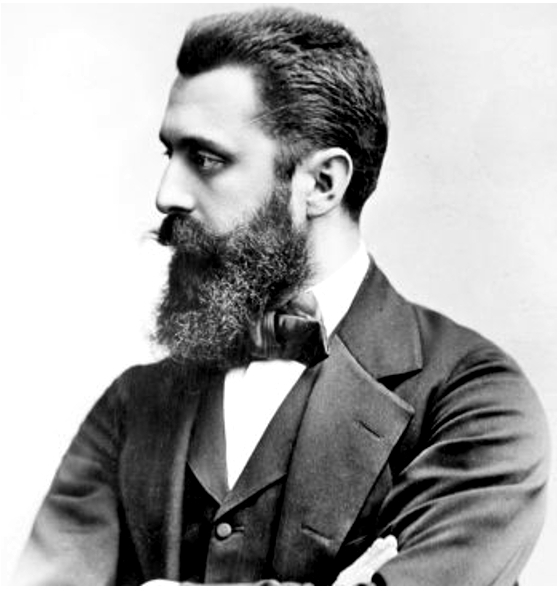
Theodor Herzl, a key figure in the development of Zionism

As the 19th century wore on, the persecution of the Jews in Eastern Europe where emancipation had not occurred to the extent it did in Western Europe (or at all) increased. Starting with the state-sponsored massive anti-Jewish pogroms following the assassination of Tsar Alexander II, through the bloody pogroms of 1903 to 1906 who left thousands of Jews dead and many more wounded, continuing with the Dreyfus Affair in France in 1894, Jews were profoundly shocked to see the continuing extent of antisemitism from Russia to France, a country which they thought of as the home of enlightenment and liberty.

In reaction to the first, Judah Leib Pinsker published the pamphlet Auto-Emancipation on January 1, 1882. The pamphlet became influential for the Political Zionism movement. The movement was to achieve momentum under the leadership of an Austrian-Jewish journalist, Theodor Herzl, who published his pamphlet Der Judenstaat ("The Jewish State") in 1896. Prior to the Dreyfus Affair, Herzl had been an assimilationist, but after seeing how France treated its loyal Jewish subjects, he proposed building a separate Jewish state. In 1897 Herzl organized the First Zionist Congress in Basel, Switzerland, which founded the World Zionist Organization (WZO) and elected Herzl as its first president. After the state's establishment Zionism, in its various forms, would become the largest Jewish political movement, although more Jews would participate in the national politics of the countries in which they resided.

== Folkists ==
In the aftermath of the 1905 pogroms in Russia, the historian Simon Dubnow founded the Folkspartei (Yiddishe Folkspartay) which had some intellectual audience in Russia, then, in independent Poland and Lithuania in the 1920–1930s where it was represented as well in the Parliaments (Sejm, Seimas) as in numerous municipal councils (incl. Warsaw) till in the late 1930s. The party did not survive the Shoah, the Holocaust.

== Territorialists ==
The territorialists, who had split from the Zionists after the Seventh Zionist Congress in 1905, called for creation of a sufficiently large and compact Jewish territory (or territories), not necessarily in the Land of Israel and not necessarily fully autonomous. Some territorialist leaders, such as Nachman Syrkin, supported the Socialist versions of Zionism, while some others, such as Lucien Wolf, actively opposed Zionism and promoted anti-nationalist ideas. Isaac Nachman Steinberg, one of the founders of the Freeland League, held anti-authoritarian socialist views, as well as his close friend Erich Fromm, who supported Steinberg's territorialist ideas.

== Anarchists ==
While the Jews in general played an important role in the international anarchist movements, many Jewish anarchists actively promoted Yiddish language and culture, focused on specifically Jewish issues. While most Jewish anarchists were irreligious or even vehemently anti-religious, some Jewish anarchist and anti-authoritarian thinkers, such as Martin Buber, rabbi Yehuda Ashlag, Isaac Nachman Steinberg and Gustav Landauer, were religious or religiously inclined and often referred to the Torah, Talmud and other traditional Judaic sources, claiming that anarchist ideas are deeply rooted in the Jewish tradition. The Jewish anarchists believe that in the stateless, free and diverse anarchist society the Jews would have more opportunities to express their individual and cultural autonomy. Many Jewish anarchists, while promoting universal internationalist values, had actively participated in the development of the Yiddish culture and Jewish community life.

There was some intersection between the Jewish anarchist, Folkist and Territorialist movements. For example, Isaac Nachman Steinberg, a renowned Territorialist leader, held anarchist views. Most Jewish anarchists supported anarcho-syndicalism and communist anarchism, while a few were individualist anarchists. The small contemporary anarchist movement in Israel is very active in peace and Palestinian solidarity actions.

== Modern Jewish political movements ==
Zionism continues to be the central trans-national political movement of most Jews, although it has split into a variety of branches and philosophies that span the political spectrum from left-wing to right-wing. Jews are also active in government in many of the countries in which they live, as well as in Jewish community organizations that often take political positions.

=== Outside Israel ===
In the 20th century, Jews in Europe and the Americas traditionally tended towards the political left, and played key roles in the birth of the labor movement as well as socialism. While Diaspora Jews have also been represented in the conservative side of the political spectrum, even politically conservative Jews have tended to support pluralism more consistently than many other elements of the political right. Daniel J. Elazar connects this pluralist tendency to the fact that Jews are not expected to proselytize, and argues that whereas Christianity and Islam anticipate a single world-state, Judaism does not. This lack of a universalizing religion is combined with the fact that most Jews live as minorities in their countries, and that no central Jewish religious authority has existed for over 2,000 years. (See list of Jews in politics, which illustrates the diversity of Jewish political thought and of the roles Jews have played in politics.)

There are also a number of Jewish secular organizations at the local, national, and international levels. These organizations often play an important part in the Jewish community. Most of the largest groups, such as Hadassah and the United Jewish Communities, have an elected leadership. No one secular group represents the entire Jewish community, and there is often significant internal debate among Jews about the stances these organizations take on affairs dealing with the Jewish community as a whole, such as antisemitism and Israeli policies. In the United States and Canada today, the mainly secular United Jewish Communities (UJC), formerly known as the United Jewish Appeal (UJA), represents over 150 Jewish Federations and 400 independent communities across North America. Every major American city has its local "Jewish Federation", and many have sophisticated community centers and provide services, mainly health care-related. They raise record sums of money for philanthropic and humanitarian causes in North America and Israel. Other organizations such as the Anti-Defamation League, American Jewish Congress, American Jewish Committee, American Israel Public Affairs Committee, Zionist Organization of America, Americans for a Safe Israel (AFSI), B'nai B'rith and Agudath Israel represent different segments of the American Jewish community on a variety of issues.

The 21st century has brought changes in the political leanings of Jewish communities in the diaspora. In the U.S. and Canada, the two largest Jewish diaspora communities, voters are shifting from liberal to more conservative leanings. In 2011, an Ipsos Reid exit poll of voters in the federal election of Canada found that 52 per cent of Jewish voters supported the Conservatives, 24 per cent the Liberals and 16 per cent the NDP, reflecting " an enormous shift in voter preference among Canadian Jews." The shift appears to reflect an alignment with Israeli prime minister Benjamin Netanyahu's right-wing coalition government and its views on Israel's security. The Jewish community in Great Britain is also leaning conservative in the 21st century as a poll published by the Jewish Chronicle in early 2015 shows. Of British Jews polled, 69% would vote for the Conservative Party, while 22% would vote for the Labour Party. This is in stark contrast to the rest of the voter population, which according to a BBC poll had Conservatives and Labor almost tied at about a third each. Jews have typically been a part of the British middle class, traditional home of the Conservative Party, though the number of Jews in working class communities of London is in decline. The main voting bloc of poorer Jews in Britain now, made up primarily of ultra-Orthodox, votes "en masse" for the Conservatives. Attitudes toward Israel influence the vote of three out of four of British Jews.

== See also ==
- Judaism and politics
- Jewish left - Jewish conservatism
- Soviet Jewry movement
- Zionism
- Cosmopolitanism
- Jewish Question
- Union Organizer
