= Nochum Shtif =

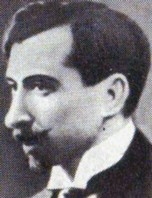
- Born: Nochum Shtif; October 6, 1879; Rovno, Volhynia Governorate, Russian Empire
- Died: April 7, 1933 (aged 53); Kiev, Ukrainian SSR, Soviet Union
- Other name: Baal Dimion (pen name)
- Occupations: Yiddish linguist and writer

Nohum Shtif (Yiddish: נחום שטיף; 1879, Rovno – 1933, Kiev), was a Jewish linguist, literary historian, publisher, translator, and philologist of the Yiddish language and social activist. In his early years he wrote under the pen name Baal Dimion (or Bal-Dimyen, "Master of Imagination").

== Early years ==
Shtif was born on 29 September 1879 (6 October 1879 on the Gregorian calendar) to a prosperous family in Rovno, in the Volhynia Governorate of the Russian Empire (now in Ukraine). He received both a Jewish and a secular education. Even as a student at a Russian secondary school and, later, at Kiev Polytechnic University (where he was enrolled between 1899 and 1903), he continued studying religious and modern Hebrew literature.

== Activities ==
Following the First Zionist Congress in Basel in 1897, he became an ardent Zionist and helped establish the radical student Zionist organization Molodoy Izrail (Young Israel), and also participated in the 1902 Minsk Zionist Conference. The scholar Gennady Estraikh reports that in an early, unpublished article, Shtif "pioneered an ideological concept later employed by the Zionist Socialist Workers Party: emigration and colonization as a means of creating a Jewish proletariat, which, according to Shtif, could not exist in the repressive environment of Russia".

In the autumn of 1903, Shtif cofounded the Vozrozhdenie (Renaissance) Jewish socialist group in Kiev with A. Ben-Adir and W. Fabrikant. Shortly thereafter, he was arrested for his political activities and was expelled from the Kiev Polytechnic University. From late 1904 until early 1906, he lived in Bern, Switzerland, where he organized a local Vozrozhdenie group and agitated against the General Jewish Labour Bund in Lithuania, Poland and Russia. In April 1906, with other activists from Vozrozhdenie, he founded the Jewish Socialist Labor Party in Kiev. Its members, also known as Sejmists, sought Jewish national autonomy in Russia and became committed Yiddishists.

Between 1906 and 1910, Shtif spent time in Kiev, Vilna, Vitebsk, and Saint Petersburg. He was a party agitator, an editor for modern Yiddish literature at the Kletskin publishing house in Vilna (Vilnius), and an employee of the Jewish Colonization Association (ICA). He also published several articles on literary criticism, politics and Yiddish philology in Russian and Yiddish periodicals. In 1910, he moved back to Rovno, where he worked at a Jewish bank and contributed to various periodicals, usually under the pseudonym Bal-Dimyen (Dreamer). He completed his dissertation and graduated from the Jaroslavl (Galicia) Law School in 1913.

In 1914 Shtif returned to Vilna, and became the editor of the publication, Di Vokh (The Week). Also in 1914, he started the Yiddish children's series "פֿאַר אונדזערע קינדער" ("For Our Children"). While living in St. Petersburg during the years 1915–1918, he worked for the Jewish aid organization, YEKOPO (Evreiskii Komitet Pomoshchi Zhertvam Voiny, Jewish Committee to Aid Victims of the War), editing its journal, and was active in Hevrah Mefitsei Haskalah (Society for the Promotion of Culture among the Jews of Russia) and with instituting Yiddish as the language of instruction in Jewish schools. In 1917, after the February Revolution, Shtif became one of the founders of the revived Folkspartei (People's Party), whose newspaper, Folksblat, he co-published with Israel Efroikin. In 1918, Shtif moved to Kiev, where he was active in YEKOPO and also devoted himself to journalism. His writings, including the pamphlet Yidn un yidish, oder ver zaynen "yidishistn" un vos viln zey? (Jews and Yiddish, or Who Are the "Yiddishists" and What Do They Want?, 1919), concerned the Jewish future in the post-war world, which Shtif envisioned as a brotherhood of nations that included Jews as an autonomous national collective with a highly developed Yiddish culture.

After the Bolsheviks overtook Kiev in October 1920, Shtif left Russia, spending a short time in Minsk, where he and Zelig Kalmanovitch gave lectures for Yiddish teachers, and then moved to Kovno (Kaunas). In 1922 he settled in Berlin after having earned a doctorate at Yaroslavl State University, Russia, with a thesis on criminal law in the Torah and Talmud.

In October 1924, Shtif drafted a memorandum entitled, Vegn a yidishn akademishn institut (About a Yiddish Academic Institute), in which he outlined a plan for an academic Yiddish institute and library. He proposed that the institute contain four scholarly sections: one for Yiddish philology; one for Jewish history; one to deal with social and economic issues; and a pedagogical section, which would include a bibliographic center, for collecting and recording publications in Yiddish. Shtif argued that the creation of an academic institute to support scholarship was a necessary step in the growth of Yiddish culture: "There arrives the time when every people at a certain level of cultural development must and wishes to participate directly in the scholarly work of the entire intellectual world."

On March 24, 1925, the Central Education Committee (Tsentrale Bildungs Komitet or TSBK), the Vilna branch of the Central Yiddish School Organization (Tsentrale Yidishe Shul Organizatsye or TSYSHO) and the Vilna Education Society (Vilner Bildungs Gezelshaft or VILBIG) met to discuss Shtif’s memorandum, which they approved in a brochure entitled, Di organizatsye fun der yidisher visnshaft (The Organization of Yiddish Scholarship, Vilna, April 1925). At a conference held in Berlin, on August 7 to 12, 1925, Shtif, along with Max Weinreich and Elias Tcherikover, among others, came to decisions about the research and publishing programs, and the organizational structure of the Yiddish Scientific Institute, commonly known as YIVO. With as yet only limited funds, the research sections of the new institute – organized essentially along the lines that Shtif had proposed – began their work, at first both in Berlin and in Vilna, in fall 1925.

== Last years ==
Shtif, while involved in organizing the YIVO in Vilna, was lured by the unprecedented scale of state-sponsored Jewish cultural development in the Soviet Union, particularly in Ukraine. In 1926, he was invited to oversee the Kiev Institute of Jewish Proletarian Culture (previously known as the Chair or Division for Jewish Culture at the Ukrainian Academy of Sciences).

At the same time, he launched a professional philological journal, Di yidishe shprakh (The Yiddish Language; 1926-1930), later called Afn shprakhfront (On the Language Front; 1931-1933), which he also edited. He also continued to publish articles on the history of Yiddish literature and language, on language planning, on the development of Yiddish spelling, and on issues of stylistics. For a short time, he directed the Kiev Institute, but later headed only its philological section. Yoysef Liberberg, a Communist Party member, replaced Shtif as director of the Institute of Jewish Proletarian Culture. In 1928, both men were severely criticized for attempting to bring Simon Dubnow to Kiev as a guest of honor for a ceremonial opening.

Shtif died at his desk in Kiev on 7 April 1933, while attempting to vindicate himself of the charge made against him in Soviet Russia for his bourgeois and “provincial Yiddishist approach.”
