= David Lvovich =

Russian-Jewish politician (1882–1950)

David Lvovich (1882–1950), known by the pseudonym Davidovich, was a Russian-Jewish politician. Lvovich was one of the main leaders of the Zionist Socialist Workers Party (SS).

He was born in southern Russia. Lvovich's involvement in radical politics began in 1903, as after a visit to Minsk where he acquinted the Poalei Zion movement. He visited Palestine in 1905, and following this visit he embraced territorialism. He became a member of the SS Odessa Party Committee and led the SS Self-Defense Unit during the October 1905 pogrom.

In 1907 Lvovich represented SS at the congress of the Second International in Stuttgart. In 1908 he and other SS leaders settled in Vienna, where they formed a commune of sorts (nick-named 'the hunger commune' due to their limited resources).

Lvovich stayed in the United States during the First World War, but returned to Russia to contest the 1917 Russian Constituent Assembly election. Lvovich, now a leader of the United Jewish Socialist Workers Party (Fareynikte), was elected as a deputy from the Kherson constituency as a candidate on the Socialist-Revolutionary list.

Moving away from partisan politics, Lvovich opted for concentrating his energies to build the ORT movement in Russia. In 1919 he left Russia and together with Leon Bramson he sought to build the ORT movement internationally. Lvovich moved to Berlin in 1921. In 1921 he co-founded the World ORT. In 1932 he moved to Paris where he stayed until 1939, after which he emigrated to the United States. In 1937 he became the Vice Chairman of World ORT, in 1946 becoming its co-president.

In the aftermath of the Second World War, Lvovich organized occupational training activities in displaced persons' camps.
