= Kherson electoral district =

Constituency of the Russian Republic

Kherson
- Former Civilian constituency for the All-Russian Constituent Assembly
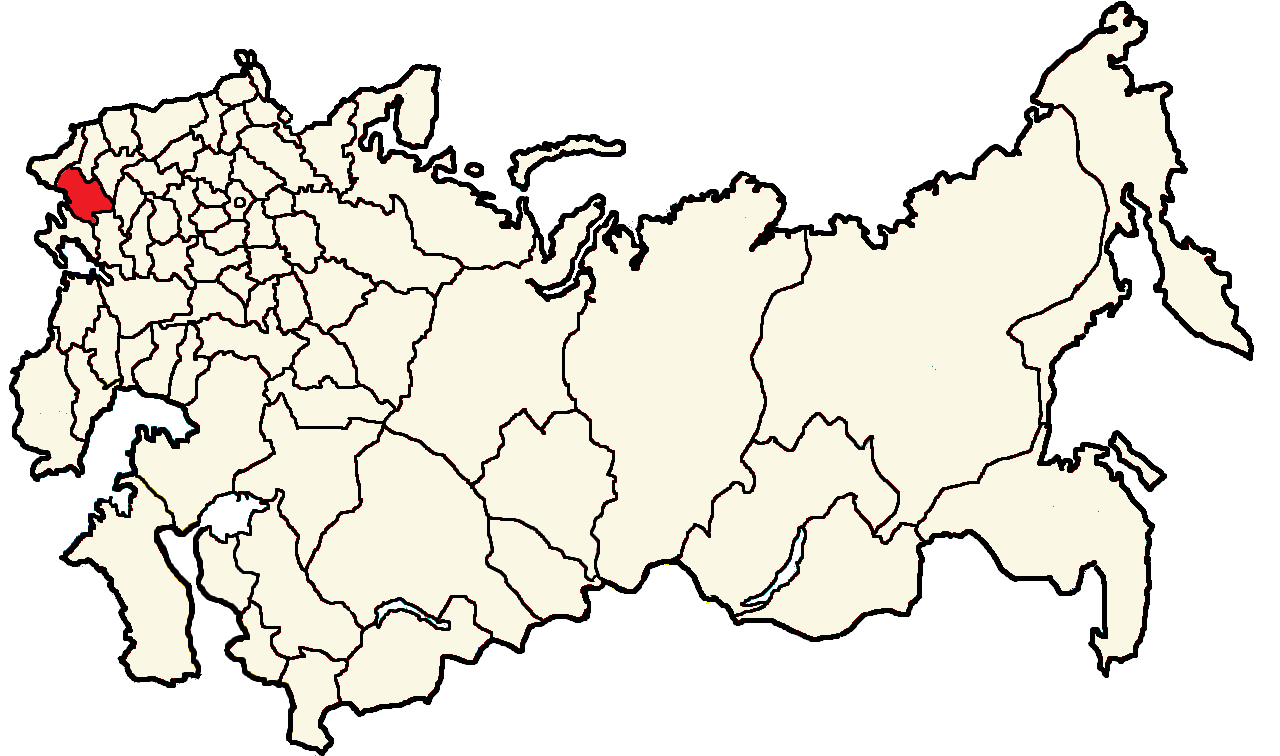

Former constituency
- Created: 1917
- Abolished: 1918
- Number of members: 18
- Number of Uyezd Electoral Commissions: 6
- Number of Urban Electoral Commissions: 4
- Number of Parishes: 202

The Kherson electoral district (Russian: Херсонский избирательный округ) was a constituency created for the 1917 Russian Constituent Assembly election.

The electoral district covered the Kherson Governorate.

Odessa witnessed fierce competition for the Jewish vote, with fist-fights between Bundists and Zionists. David Lvovich of Fareynikte was elected as a SR list candidate.

== Results ==
According to the U.S. historian Oliver Henry Radkey, whose account is the source for the results table below, the Odessa city results appeared complete, the Odessa uezd possibly incomplete, the Kherson uezd having results from 195 out of 223 voting centers, no indication about whether 2 other uezds results were complete or not. From the remaining 2 uezds the results were missing altogether.

Kherson
Party	Vote	%
List 4 - Ukrainian SRs, SRs and the United Jewish Socialist Labour Party (S.S. and E.S.)	266,771	42.98
List 10 - Jewish Bloc	86,190	13.89
List 9 - Bolsheviks	81,826	13.18
List 8 - Ukrainian Soc.-Dem. Labour Party	63,159	10.18
List 5 - Kadets	53,770	8.66
List 3 - Russian Citizens of German Nationality	27,879	4.49
List 7 - Mensheviks-Bund	14,369	2.31
List 1 - [Orthodox] Clergy and Laymen	13,038	2.10
List 11 - Popular Socialists	5,626	0.91
List 2 - Russian Popular State Union (Rightists)	4,217	0.68
List 12 - Old Believers	2,188	0.35
List 6 - Poalei Zion	1,687	0.27
Total:	620,720	

Deputies Elected
Gruzenberg	Jewish National Bloc
Tyomkin	Jewish National Bloc
Meiendorf	German
Asmolov	SR
Bontzarevich	SR
Eremenchuk	SR
Feofilaktov	SR
Gavrilyuk	SR
Glevenko	SR
Holubovych	SR
Gordievsky	SR
Lvovich	SR
Richter	SR
Trichevsky	SR
Troichuk	SR
Vekhtev	SR
Yuritsin	SR
Velikhov	Kadet
Chekhivsky	Ukrainian SD
Sklyar	Bolshevik

Per the Menshevik newspaper Vpered, in Odessa city the Jewish Bloc got 27% of the vote, the Bolsheviks 25%, the Kadets 16%, the SRs 6%, the rightists 5% and the Mensheviks 4%. In Kherson city the Jewish Bloc got 5,522 votes, the Bolsheviks 3,899 votes, the SRs 3,533 votes, the Kadets 3,357, the Ukrainian Social-Democrats 1,728 votes, Orthodox Clergy and Laymen 2,036 votes. In Elisabetgrad the Jewish Bloc got 7,829 votes, the Kadets 3,719 votes, the Ukrainian Social Democrats 3,640 votes, the Bolsheviks 1,744 votes and the Menshevik-Bund list 1,279 votes. In Nikolaev the most voted list was that of the Bolsheviks, followed by the SRs, Jewish Bloc, Kadets and Ukrainians respectively.
