= Volhynia electoral district =

Constituency of the Russian Republic

Volhynia
- Former Civilian constituency for the All-Russian Constituent Assembly
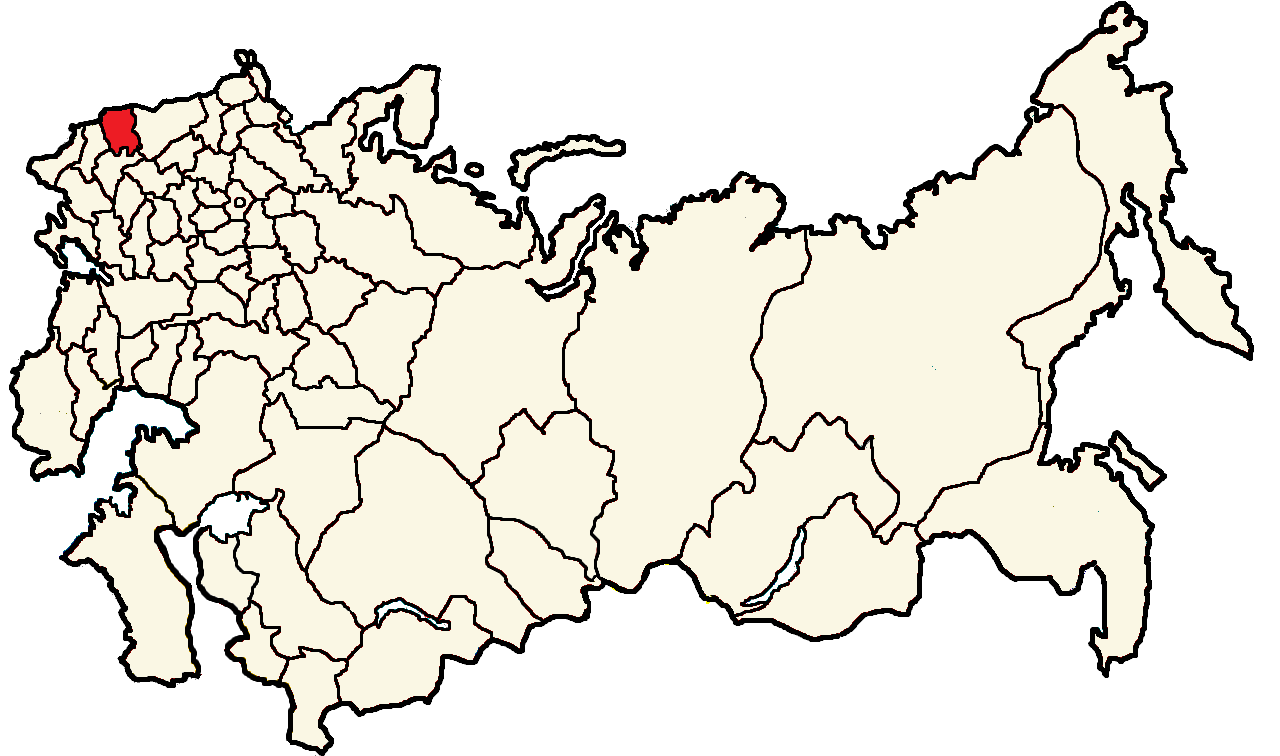

Former constituency
- Created: 1917
- Abolished: 1918
- Number of members: 10
- Number of Uyezd Electoral Commissions: 7
- Number of Urban Electoral Commissions: 1
- Number of Parishes: 140

The Volhynia electoral district (Russian: Волынский избирательный округ) was a constituency created for the 1917 Russian Constituent Assembly election. The electoral district covered the Volhynian Governorate. The western parts of the governorate were under German or Austrian occupation. U.S. historian Oliver Henry Radkey, whose account forms the basis of the table below, expresses concern that the account from Volhynia (exclusively brought from a 1918 study by N. S. Sviatitski) may have been largely incomplete, possibly an effect of the proximity to the battle lines.

A total of 17 submitted lists were rejected, out of which 5 were peasants' lists.

== Results ==
Volhynia
Party	Vote	%	Seats
List 11 - Ukrainian Socialist-Revolutionaries and Council of Peasant Deputies	569,044	70.76	9
List 4 - Polish	57,998	7.21	1
Jewish national lists; List 2 - Jewish National Electoral Committee; List 3 - Jewish National Party; List 8 - Jewish Community Personalities	55,967	6.96	
List 12 - Bolsheviks	35,612	4.43	
List 6 - Socialist-Revolutionaries	27,575	3.43	
List 5 - Kadets and Non-Party Farmers	22,337	2.78	
List 1 - Mensheviks-Bund	16,947	2.11	
List 13 - Rightists and coreligionists	1,438	0.18	
List 10 - United Jewish Socialist Labour Party (S.S. and E.S.)	?		
List 9 - Poalei Zion	?		
List 7 - Ukrainian Socialist-Federalists	?		
Unaccounted	17,290	2.15	
Total:	804,208		10

In Zhitomir town the Polish list got 3,592 votes (17.4%), the Kadet-Farmer list 3,077 votes (14.9%), the Ukrainian SRs 2,756 votes (13.4%), the Bolsheviks 2,117 votes (10.3%), the Jewish Community Personalities list 1,943 votes (9.5%), the Jewish National Electoral Committee 1,858 votes (9%), the rightist list 1,453 (7%), the Menshevik-Bund list 1,426 votes (6.9%), the SR 1,011 votes (4.9%), the United Jewish Socialist Labour Party 529 votes (2.6%), the Ukrainian Socialist-Federalists 489 votes (2.3%), the Jewish National Party 269 votes (1.3%) and Poalei Zion 104 votes (0.5%). In the Zhitomir garrison the Ukrainian SRs got 1,757 votes (35.8%), the Kadet-Farmer list 931 votes (19.1%), the SR 855 votes (17.4%), the Bolsheviks 656 votes (13.4%), the Polish list 223 votes (4.5%), the Menshevik-Bund list 221 votes (4.5%), the Ukrainian Socialist-Federalist list 113 votes (2.3%), the rightist list 73 votes (1.5%), the Jewish National Electoral Committee 23 votes (0.5%), the United Jewish Socialist Labour Party 23 votes (0.5%), the Jewish Community Personalities list 13 votes (0.2%), the Jewish National Party 12 votes (0.2%) and Poalei Zion 7 votes (0.1%).
