= Zeev Latsky =

Jewish Ukrainian political activist and civil servant

Minister of Jewish Affairs
- In office April 1918 – December 1918
- Prime Minister: Vsevolod Holubovych
- Preceded by: Moishe Zilberfarb
- Succeeded by: Solomon Goldelman (Note: Appointed acting minister of labor and acting secretary for national minorities in December 1918)

Personal details
- Born: 1881 Kiev, Russian Empire
- Died: 1940 (aged 58–59)
- Party: Folkspartei
- Occupation: statesman, writer, publisher

Ya'akov Ze'ev Latsky ("Bertoldi") (Note: also spelled Zeev Latski, also quoted as Ze'ew-Wolf Latzki-Bertholdi) (1881–1940) was a Jewish Ukrainian political and Yiddishist activist and briefly a Minister in the Ukrainian People's Republic in 1918.

First a member of Herut (Note: a socialist organization (Labor Zionism), cf. Ze'ew-Wolf Latzki-Bertholdi at the Electronic Jewish Encyclopedia). Not to be confused with the Israeli political party of the same name.) around 1901, he joined in December 1904 the new Zionist Socialist Workers Party to whose Central Committee he was elected in Odessa. He was closely associated with the theorist of Labour Zionism and leading advocate of Territorialist Zionism, Nachman Syrkin.

After the 1917 Revolution, he joined the Folkspartei. In April 1918, he was appointed Minister for Jewish Affairs in the Ukrainian People's Republic, replacing Fareynikte Moishe Zilberfarb. He was succeeded briefly by Solomon Goldelman, then in January 1919 by Abraham Revutzky of Poale Zion.

In October 1918, he was amongst the founders of an important Yiddish publishing house Folks-Farlag, initiated by intellectuals affiliated to the Folkspartei, like himself.

In 1920, he emigrated to Germany, where he continued searching for places to build a Jewish homeland. From 1923 to 1925 he traveled around the Jewish settlements in South America, about which he wrote a book, Einwanderung in di Yiddish Ishuwim in Dorem America (Immigration to the Jewish Communities of South America, 1926).

In 1925, he moved to Riga, where he published the daily Yiddish newspapers Dos Folk and Freemorgn. By the end of 1925 he had become disillusioned with Territorialism and switched to Zionism, immigrating to Palestine. There, he became a member of Mapai and was deputy director of the Histadrut archives. Latsky was buried in Palestine.

== Bibliography ==
- Yiddish: Bertoldi [Zeev Latski], “Yudishkayt un yuden, oder, vegen yudisher apikorsus,” Di yudishe velt 1, no. 2 (February 1914): 228–46
- Yiddish: Latski-Bertoldi, Ibergezetst fun hebraish, Tsentral-Byuro fun der Velt-Faraynigung Poyle-Tsien (Ts. S.)-Hitaḥadut (Tel-Aviv), 1940, OCLC 12242880
- Yiddish: "Einwanderung in di Yiddish Ishuwim in Dorem America," 1926
