= Socialist Zionists =

Socialist Zionists can refer to:

- Adherents of Socialist Zionism (Labor Zionism), a major ideological and political current in the history of Zionism and Israel
- Adherents of the Zionist Socialist Workers Party, a Jewish revolutionary party in pre-1917 Russia
