= Jacob Lestschinsky =

Ukrainian-born Jewish statistician and sociologist

Jakob Lestschinsky
- יעקב לשצ'ינסקי
- Born: August 26, 1876; Horodyshche, Kiev Governorate, Russian Empire
- Died: March 22, 1966 (aged 89); Jerusalem, Israel
- Known for: Jewish demography, economic history
- Scientific career
- Fields: Statistics, sociology
- Workplaces: YIVO Institute for Jewish Research, Institute of Jewish Affairs

Jakob Lestschinsky (also Jacob Lestschinsky, Yankev Leshtshinski, Yankev Leshchinski, Hebrew: יעקב לשצ'ינסקי; August 26, 1876 – March 22, 1966) was a Ukrainian-born Jewish statistician and sociologist. He specialized in Jewish demography and economic history, and wrote in Yiddish, German, and English. During the February Revolution in Russia he helped found the United Jewish Socialist Workers Party and served on the editorial board of Naye tsayt, its official journal. During the war he lived in New York City, and worked with the Institute of Jewish Affairs of the World Jewish Congress.

== Life ==
Born near Kyiv, he received a traditional Jewish education. As a teenager, he was deeply moved by Hebrew writer Ahad Ha'am. After university study in Switzerland for a decade, he returned to Russia in 1913. He was involved in various Zionist and socialist political activities, such as the Zionist Socialist Workers Party.

After being imprisoned in the aftermath of the October Revolution, he left Russia in 1921 for Berlin. There he was a correspondent for the New York Yiddish daily Forverts, a role he continued for more than 40 years. Lestschinsky sent a dispatch to Forward which was published in the New York Times on March 26, 1933, in which he said: "The Hitler regime flames up with anger because it has been compelled through fear of public foreign opinion to forego a mass slaughter of Jews".

Lestschinsky left Germany for Warsaw in 1933 where he continued to work as Europe correspondent for the Forverts. After being refused entry by the Polish authorities after a holiday trip he emigrated with his wife and daughter to Switzerland and then to the United States in 1938, and finally to Israel in 1959.

== YIVO ==
He was a founding member of YIVO (Institute for Jewish Research) in Vilna (then in Poland), starting its Section for Economics and Statistics which was based in Berlin. He also edited the Bleter far yidisher demografye, statistik, un ekonomik, which appeared in Berlin from 1923 until 1925, and the Economic-Statistical Section publications Ekonomishe shriftn and Yidishe ekonomik.

== Selected works ==
- Yidishe Folk in Tsifern (1922)
- Jüdische Bevölkerungsbewegung (1926)
- "Die Umsiedlung und Umschichtung des jüdischen Volkes im Laufe des letzten Jahrhunderts" (1929), Weltwirtschaftliches Archiv, 30: 123-156
- Di Yidishe Katastrofe (1944)
- Crisis, Catastrophe, and Survival: A Jewish Balance Sheet, 1914–1948 (1948)
- Erev Hurbn (1951)
