= Jewish movements =

Jewish movements may refer to:

- Jewish political movements
- Jewish religious movements
