= Klainer SS =

Children's organization in the Russian Empire

Klainer SS (Yiddish: קליינער ס.ס, 'Little SS') was a children's organization in the Russian Empire, tied to the Zionist Socialist Workers Party (colloquially known by its Russian initials 'SS'). Klainer SS was founded in Warsaw in late 1905, in the back-drop of the Russian Revolution of 1905.
