= Der proletarisher gedank =

- Founded: 1919
- Ceased publication: 1927
- Political alignment: Jewish Social Democratic Labour Party (Poalei Zion)
- Language: Russian (1919-1926); Yiddish (1926-1927)
- Country: Soviet Russia

Der proletarisher gedank (Yiddish: דער פראלעטארישער געדאנק, 'The Proletarian Thought') was a journal published in Soviet Russia 1919–1927. It was the organ of the Central Committee of the Jewish Social Democratic Labour Party (Poalei Zion) (later renamed the Jewish Communist Labour Party (Poalei Zion)). It was initially published in Russian language under the title Evreiskaya proletarskaya mysl (Russian: Еврейская пролетарская мысль, 'Jewish Proletarian Thought') until 1926, before becoming a Yiddish language publication in 1926. Evreiskaya proletarskaya mysl was initially issued from Kiev, then shifting to Kharkov and eventually began to be issued from Moscow. The journal was printed at the Molot print shop in Moscow. The newspaper was one of a handful of non-communist Jewish newspapers allowed to be published legally, albeit under supervision of a censor.

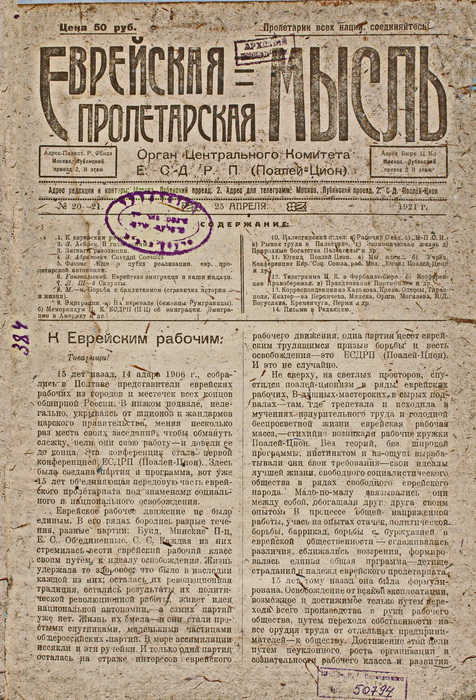
Evreiskaya proletarskaya mysl, April 25, 1921

The newspaper persistently challenged the official Communist International line on the Palestine question.

The fiftieth issue of Der proletarisher gedank was published in November 1927 before the journal ceased its publication.
