= Folkism =

Folkism may refer to:

- Folkism, a movement in Nigerian literature
- The ideology of Folkspartei, a Jewish Autonomism movement
- Halkçılık, a Turkish political ideology
- Völkisch movement, a German ethnic nationalist movement

== See also ==
- Populism, a political ideology emphasising the "common people"
