= Biuro Centralne Bezpartyjnych Związków Zawodowych =

Trade union centre in Poland

Biuro Centralne Bezpartyjnych Związków Zawodowych ('Central Bureau of Non-Party Trade Unions', abbreviated BCBZZ, Yiddish: צענטראל־ביורא פון די אומפארטייאישע פּראָפעסיאָנעלע פאראיינען) was a trade union centre in Poland. It was linked to the Ferajnigte party. The organization was formed in Warsaw in 1917, following a split from the Zionist trade union centre Biuro Centralne Robotniczych Związków Zawodowych ('Central Bureau of Workers Trade Unions'). BCBZZ had its offices at 4, Nowolipie street in Warsaw.

As of 1919, BCBZZ had 5,917 members. Its membership was distributed between Warsaw Porter Workers Trade Union (740 members), Butchers' Union (659 members), Sewing and Button-maker Workers' Union (462 members), Gas and Electricity Workers Union (229 members), Handcarts Workers Union (406 members), Shirt-maker Workers Union (348 members), Horse-Drawn Carriage Union (83 members), Sock-Maker Union (444 members), Linen Industry Labour Union (234 members), Soft Leather and Accessories Shoemakers Union (224 members), Photographers' Union (182 members), Fancy Leather-Makers Labour Union (108 members), Butter, Cheese and Eggs Labour Union (146 members), Newspaper Delivery Union (245 members), Hairdressers' Union (484 members), Soda Water Labour Union (250 members), Tailors' Union (586 members) and the American Section Labour Union (133 members).
