= Jewish Communist Workers Youth Union (Iugend Poalei Zion) =

The Jewish Communist Workers Youth Union (Iugend Poalei Zion) (Yiddish: ייִדישן קאָמוניסטישן אַרבעטער - יוגנטי פאַרבאַנד יוגנט פועלי - ציון, in Russian; EKSRM (Iugend Poalei Zion)), initially known as the Jewish Socialist Workers Youth Union (Iugend Poalei Zion) (Russian: Evreĭskiĭ sotsialisticheskiĭ soiuz rabocheĭi molodezhi (Iugend Poaleĭ-Tsion, ESSRM (Iugend Poalei Zion)), was a Labour Zionist youth organization in Soviet Russia/Soviet Union. The organization was the youth wing of the Jewish Communist Labour Party (Poalei Zion). The All-Russian Constituent Conference of ESSRM (Iugend Poalei Zion) was held March 4–10, 1921, in Moscow. This conference was followed by the first All-Russian Congress of ESSRM (Iugend Poalei Tsion), held between August 15–20, 1922, in Moscow. The organization was active until 1928.
