= Naye tsayt =

Yiddish newspaper in Ukraine (1917–1919)

- Founded: September 1917
- Ceased publication: May 1919
- Political alignment: United Jewish Socialist Workers Party
- Language: Yiddish
- Headquarters: Kyiv
- Country: Ukraine

Naye tsayt (Yiddish: נײַע צײַט, lit. ''New Times'') was a Yiddish-language newspaper published from Kyiv between September 1917 and May 1919. Naye tsayt was an organ of the United Jewish Socialist Workers Party (fareynikte). Prior to the launching of Naye tsayt, the party published Der yidisher proletarier from Kyiv.

In 1919, the newspaper was merged into Komunistishe fon.
