= Kehilla (modern) =

Jewish communal structure

The Kehilla (pl.: Kehillot) is the local Jewish communal structure that was reinstated in the early twentieth century as a modern, secular, and religious sequel of the qahal in Central and Eastern Europe, more particularly in Poland's Second Republic, Estonia, Latvia, Kingdom of Romania, Lithuania, Ukrainian People's Republic, during the interwar period (1918–1940), in application of the national personal autonomy.

Unlike the ancient Qahal/Kehilla, abolished in the Russian Empire by Tsar Nicholas I in 1844, the modern Kehilla council was elected like a municipal council, with lists of candidates presented by the various Jewish parties: Agudat Yisrael, the religious and non religious Zionists, but also the marxist Bundists and Poalists, the liberal-minded secularist Folkists, et cetera. The initial project, as submitted by the Jewish delegations to the Paris Peace Conference in 1919, was to constitute a National Jewish Council for each state, out of representatives from the various kehilla councils, like the former Council of Four Lands.

== The Kehilla during the interwar Lithuanian Republic ==
On March 4, 1920, a Law on kehillot was published in Lithuania, in which the kehilla was defined as a body recognized by public law with the right to impose taxes and to issue ordinances dealing with religious matters, education and philanthropy.

== The Warsaw Kehilla during the Second Polish Republic ==
In 1924, the Agudist candidate, Eliahu Kirszbraun, was elected as president and Jakób Trokenheim, another Agudist, as vice-president. The only other candidate for presidency was the Bundist Henryk Ehrlich. Finally, the kehilla executive reflected the composition of the council: 7 Orthodox, 6 Zionists, 1 Folkist, 1 Bundist. The Bund boycotted the 1931 elections in protest over the introduction by the Polish government, in order to favour its Agudist allies, of a “paragraph 20” in the Kehillot regulations which provided the Kehilla electoral commission with the possibility to reject a number of Agudat's opponents who were in their opinion not religious enough. In 1936, the Bund had now 15 seats out of 50 and Ehrlich was again candidate to the presidency, he got 16 votes, the Zionist candidate Yitshak Schipper 10, and the Agudist Jacob Trokenheim won by a plurality of 19 votes.

| Party or list | number of seats 1924 | number of seats 1931 | votes 1936 | number of seats 1936 |
|---|---|---|---|---|
| Agudath Yisrael | 17 | 19 | 8,079 | 12 |
| Aleksander Hasidim | 3 | - | - | - |
| Grodzhisker Hasidim | - | 2 | - | - |
| Sokolower Hasidim | - | - | 1,366 | 1 |
| Nonpartisan Religious | - | 3 | - | - |
| Zionists | 14 | 12 | 7,749 | 11 |
| Mizrahi | 5 | 4 | 3,163 | 4 |
| Revisionist Zionists | - | - | 1,149 | 1 |
| "Democrats" | - | 2 | - | - |
| Bund | 5 | (boycott) | 10,622 | 15 |
| Folkspartei | 3 | 2 | 966 | 1 |
| Poale Zion Right | - | - | 1,779 | 2 |
| Poalei Zion Left | 2 | 1 | 887 | 1 |
| Philanthropic Org. (Mr. Stueckgold) | 1 | - | 1,573 | 2 |
| Assimilationists | - | 2 | - | - |
| Other private lists | - | 3 | - | - |
| Total | 50 | 50 | - | 50 |

== Modern Kehillot ==
Informally, Kehilla can be an all-encompassing term that refers to the entirety of a Jewish community's religious and secular society, especially in regards to modern Ashkenazi Orthodox neighborhoods.

According to the Talmud, the ten things a city needs for a Torah scholar to be able to study in it are "[a] court that [punishes] with lashes and punishes [with penalties]; a charity fund, collected by two and distributed by three; a synagogue; a bathhouse; a restroom; a physician; a surgeon; a notary; (a butcher); and a teacher of children."

== See also ==
- Jewish Autonomism
- National personal autonomy
