= Jewish Autonomism =

Non-Zionist Jewish political movement

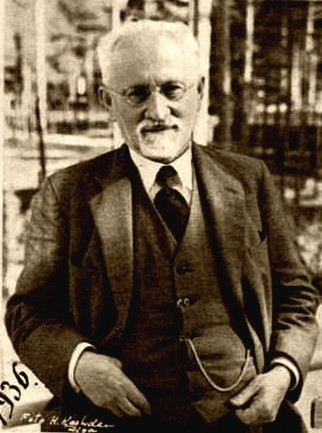
Simon Dubnow

Jewish Autonomism, not connected to the contemporary political movement autonomism, was a non-Zionist political movement and ideology that emerged in the Russian and Austro-Hungarian empires, before spreading throughout Eastern Europe in the late 19th and early 20th century. In the late 19th century, Jewish Autonomism was seen "together with Zionism [as] the most important political expression of the Jewish people in the modern era." One of its first and major proponents was the historian and activist Simon Dubnow. Jewish Autonomism is often referred to as "Dubnovism" or "folkism".

The Autonomists believed that the future survival of the Jews as a nation depends on their spiritual and cultural strength, in developing "spiritual nationhood" and in viability of Jewish diaspora as long as Jewish communities maintain self-rule and rejected assimilation. Autonomists often stressed the vitality of modern Yiddish culture. Various concepts of the Autonomism were adopted in the platforms of the Folkspartei, the Sejmists and socialist Jewish parties such as the Bund.

The movement's beliefs were similar to those of the Austro-Marxists who advocated national personal autonomy within the multinational Austro-Hungarian empire and cultural pluralists in America such as Randolph Bourne and Horace Kallen.

== Origins of Jewish Autonomism ==
Though Simon Dubnow was key in proliferating Autonomism's popularity, his ideas were not completely novel. In 1894, Jakob Kohn, a board member of the National Jewish Party of Austria published Assimilation, Antisemitismus und Nationaljudentum, a philosophical work detailing his party's perspective. Kohn argued that Jews shared not only a religion, but were connected by a long, deep-rooted ethnic history of centuries of discrimination, attempts at assimilation and exile. To Kohn, the Jews were a nation. Similar to Dubnow, Kohn called for the establishment of a Jewish organization to represent Jewish interests within the state's policies. Again, Similar to Dubnow, Kohn denounced assimilation, claiming that it worked against the establishment of a Jewish nation.

The origins of Autonomism and Dubnow's ideas remain unclear. Notable philosophical thinkers from Eastern and Western Europe including Ernest Renan, John Stuart Mill, Herbert Spencer and Auguste Comte are cited to have influenced Dubnow's ideas. Ideas from Vladimir Solovyov, Dmitry Pisarev, Nikolay Chernyshevsky and Konstantin Aksakov concerning the Russian people's distinct spiritual heritage may have brought rise to Dubnow's own ideas on the Jews shared heritage. In his memoirs, Dubnow himself refers to some of these thinkers as major influences. In addition, Dubnov had been immersed in histiographical study of Russian Jewry, its institutions and spiritual movements. This research led Dubnov to question the legitimacy of the Russians' monopoly of political power and fueled his own demands for Jewish political representation.

== Jewish Autonomist ideology ==
Jewish Autonomism advocates for the sovereignty of the Jews without a division from the governing state. Instead, Jewish Autonomism was concerned with establishing Jewish cultural minority rights within the state, primarily with an emphasis on language and educational rights. Dubnow argued that Jewish autonomism allowed Jews to simultaneously identify with Jewish nationalism and loyalty to their own state

Dubnow was the preeminent Jewish historian of his time and his Autonomism was based on his analysis of history and the implications he drew for the future. Dubnow broke the history of the Jewish nation (and all nations) into three different periods: tribal, political-territorial, and spiritual. The Jewish nation had experienced a series of tests (the loss of political independence, the loss of a homeland, the loss of a unifying language) which by passing, had allowed it (and only it so far) to ascend to the highest stage of nationhood. Without those traditional markers of nationhood, the Jewish people's continued existence was proof to him that they "had crystallized into a spiritual people... drawing on the natural or intellectual will to live." Thus, in contrast to many other ideologies, Dubnow believed that as a nation the Jews had transformed for the better. The Jews had transformed from a nation connected by a territory to a nation connected by a spirituality and heritage.

=== Ideological differences with Zionism ===
Whereas Zionism advocates for the establishment of an entirely separate Jewish state, Autonomism advocates for the sovereignty of the Jews without a division from the governing state. In fact, Dubnow felt that by his generation, the Jewish nation (unlike other nations) had superseded the use of force, and that if the Jewish nation ever developed into a state that resorted to military might, it would signify a step backwards.

Given this disagreement, it makes sense that Dubnow was skeptical both over the mission and practicality of a Jewish nation-state in Palestine, instead seeing the diaspora as the true home of the Jewish people. However, he was more receptive to Ahad Ha'am's idea of a cultural center in Palestine, although Dubnow saw it as one of many Jewish centers rather than the dominant one. As Dubnow aged, he continued to become more receptive towards Zionism, as his final thoughts on the subject were recorded in 1937 as: "a Jewish State will accommodate only a part of the Diaspora, just as was the case in ancient times... a small Judea [Palestine] alongside a ten-tribe Israel [the Diaspora]."

=== Ideological differences with assimilation ===
Unlike most assimilationists, Dubnow believed not only in full civil rights for Jews as individuals, but also stressed the need for rights for the Jewish nation within a multiethnic Russia. Dubnow feared that the Jews of the Diaspora would lose their spiritual connection with one another through assimilation, going so far as to claim that "no self respecting minority will take notice of such accusations [of separatism] because it considers its free development to be a sacred and inalienable right."

== Jewish Autonomism's spread to the United States ==
Although Jewish Autonomism originated in Eastern Europe, the movement spread to the United States, a result of the prominence that American Jews obtained in negotiating for Jewish rights in East Europe from 1919 to 1945. Oscar Janowsky perhaps most influentially advocated American diaspora nationalism; yet his version of Jewish Autonomism differed in key ways with Dubnow.

First, he called for both national autonomy in Eastern Europe and national sovereignty in Palestine, a compromise between the Zionist and traditional autonomist positions. Janowsky believed that if autonomism could be successful in meeting Jewish national demands in Eastern Europe, it could also present a solution for the Arab population of Palestine. Eastern European Jews would benefit from the international recognition of Jewish nationalism due to the creation of a state in Palestine and could simultaneously serve as living proof that an Arab minority population could retain nationhood and autonomy in a majority-Jewish state.

Janowsky also broke with traditional Dubnowian thought in suggesting that Jewish people in both the United States and enlightened Western Europe did not need the form of national autonomy that they favored for Eastern European Jews, favoring assimilation then in some cases, unlike Dubnow.

Other prominent American autonomists disagreed with Janowsky, viewing Jewish cultural autonomy in the United States as essential rather than unnecessary or subservient to cultural autonomy in East Europe or political autonomy in Palestine.

== Key historical moments for Jewish Autonomism ==
=== Folkspartei movement ===
In the early 1900s, the Folkspartei, a political party advocating for Jewish Autonomism strove for good relations with other Jewish parties, including the Zionists. An attempt was made to establish a Jewish National Club, an inter-party organization to coordinate collaboration between the two parties. However, this failed when the Folkists objected to accepting an unequal number of committee representatives.

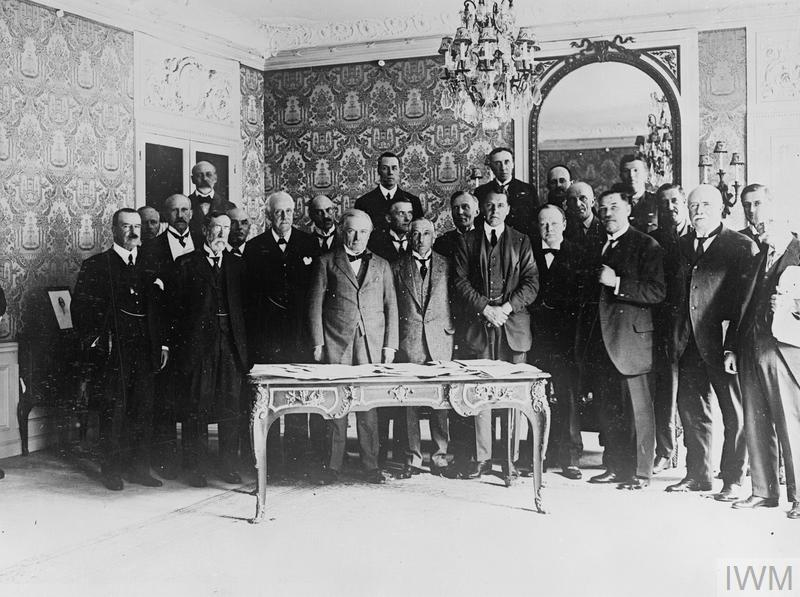
Delegates meeting at the Paris Peace Conference of 1919 made some progress for Jewish Autonomism, although nothing ultimately substantial or enforceable.

=== Paris Peace Conference ===
One of the primary functions of the Paris Peace Conference of 1919 was to grant new states international recognition as the successors of failed and outdated multi-ethnic empires. Central to the conference's objectives was devising a solution for the minority groups that resided in each new state. The Jewish problem was particularly put front and center as if its questions were paradigmatic of all national minority issues.

Jewish leaders demanded that they be recognized as an autonomous group with the right to organize its own religious, cultural, philanthropic, and social institutions. This primarily meant the ability for Jews to run schools and other cultural institutions in the language of their choosing.

While these represented important achievements, some Jewish leaders who took a more maximalist view of minority rights saw the Paris Peace Conference as insufficient. Despite successes of Jewish citizenship and linguistic and cultural rights, membership in the League of Nations, reparations, and self-regulated emigration were all ideas that were not adopted. Without these some felt that Jewish people had still not achieved true diaspora nationalism.

Unfortunately, even the limited objectives won by diaspora nationalists were not realized, as the Peace Conference relied on either nation-states to enforce these rights themselves (which they were never keen to do) or let the League of Nations punish violators (which never occurred due to its gridlock and incompetence).

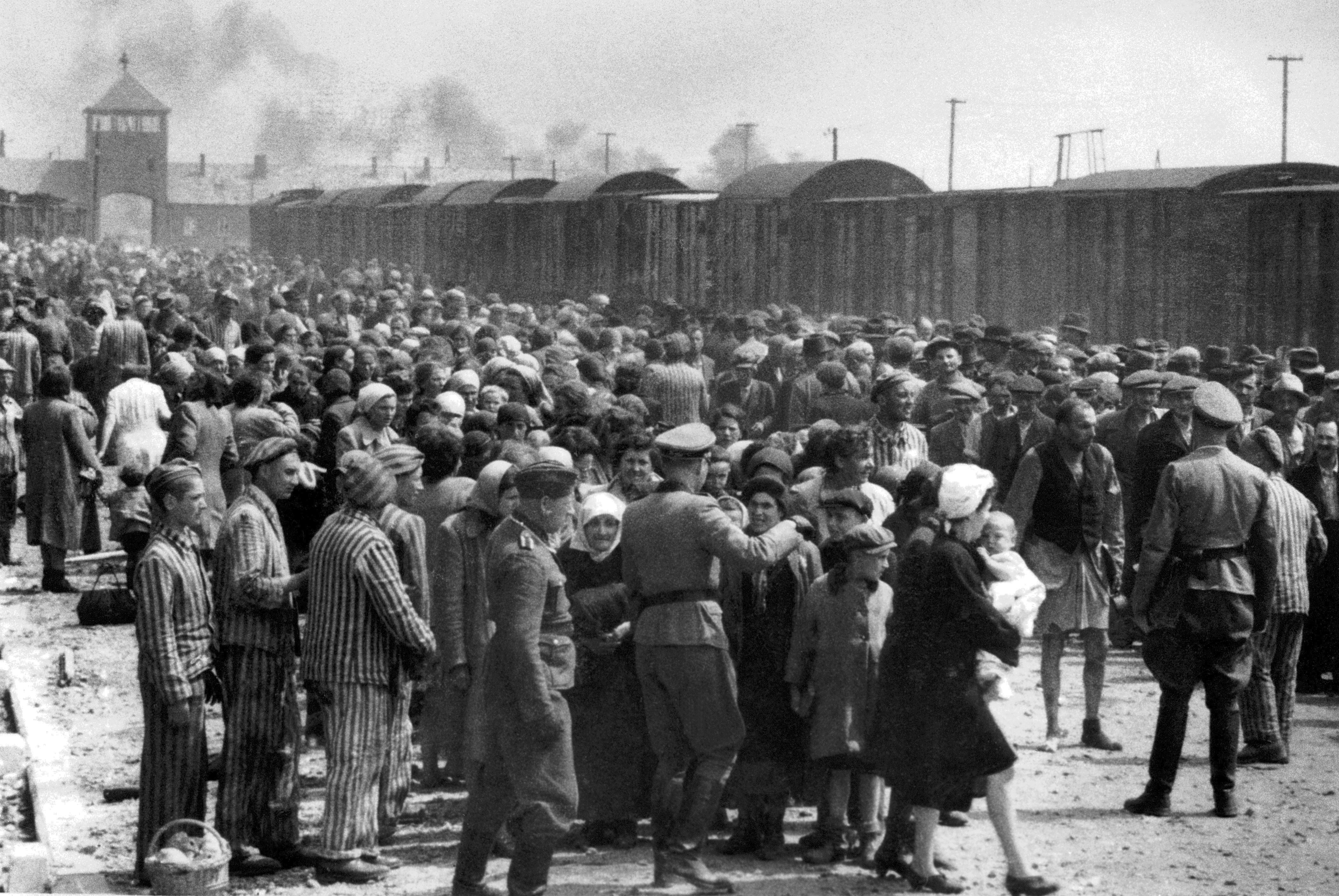
The atrocities of the Holocaust shown here at Auschwitz-II-Birkaneau in German-occupied Poland, May/June 1944, convinced European Jewry that Jewish Autonomism had failed.

=== The Holocaust ===
The Holocaust was the end of Jewish Autonomism as a popular concept. The failures of Jewish autonomists to foresee the horrors and destruction that the Holocaust would cause permanently tainted their message, and most Jewish thinkers gravitated over to supporting Zionism. The Jewish populace at large gave up on ideas of both assimilation or minority rights, viewing the Holocaust as a culmination of those ideologies flaws. Tragically, Jewish Autonomism's most influential proponent, Simon Dubnow, was murdered in the 1941 Rumbula massacre and with his death came the end of Autonomism's practical impact in politics.

From April 1947, Folkists active in post-war Łódź attempted to operate under the name Frajlandige Organization (Frajland-Ligt) in Poland. It was part of an international organization of the same name.

Representatives of "Frajland-Ligt" advocated for the creation of several autonomous centers where Jews could live. They believed that Jews could live in what was then Palestine, Birobidzhan in the Russian Far East, and Suriname, which was then a colony of the Netherlands and known as Dutch Guiana. "Frajland-Ligt" activists particularly emphasized the possibility of some Jews emigrating to what was then Dutch Guiana. They cited several arguments:

- opposition to assimilation, which was popular in some European countries,

- disputes between Zionists and some Arabs and the authorities in London over the future of Palestine, and the Zionists' reluctance to cultivate Yiddish culture,

- supporters of "Frajland-Ligt" noted that the Jewish nation, deprived of its ancient homeland, was developing in the diaspora countries.

Proposing the settlement of approximately 30,000 Jews in Dutch Guiana, representatives of "Frajland-Ligt" pointed out that these areas were sparsely populated. They planned to build an economy based on agriculture and industry. They raised the possibility of granting Jews local government, autonomous rights, and temporary tax exemptions. "Frajland-Ligt" activists argued that Jews would be citizens of Dutch Guiana, with the opportunity to study Yiddish and Dutch in schools. Supporters of "Frajland-Ligt" valued ensuring the free development of Jewish culture, including religion and customs, as well as the ability to observe Jewish Sabbaths and holidays. To further their cause, representatives of "Frajland-Ligt" held talks with the Dutch authorities between 1946 and 1948 regarding the possibility of Jewish emigration to Dutch Guiana. These talks ended in failure.

The Łódź branch of "Frajland-Ligt" had 15 members and had not been registered since the beginning of 1948. This was due to the lack of consent from Łódź's mayor, Eugeniusz Stawiński; the organization operated until the end of 1948.

The Jewish Democratic Party (ŻSD) published the Bulletin of the Jewish Democratic Party. The bulletin appeared from May 1946 to May 1948, with a circulation of 2,000 copies. The party opposed the Central Committee of Polish Jews, which was dominated by Jewish communists from the Polish Workers' Party (PPR). Despite numerous attempts, the party did not establish cooperation with the Polish Democratic Party.

== See also ==
- Jewish Autonomous Oblast
