= National personal autonomy =

Principle in Austromarxism; expression of left-wing nationalism

National personal autonomy is one form of non-territorial autonomy that grew out of autonomy ideas developed by Austromarxist thinkers.

One of these theorists was Otto Bauer who published his view of national personal autonomy in his 1907 book Die Nationalitätenfrage und die Sozialdemokratie (The Nationalities Question and Social Democracy) was seen by him a way of gathering the geographically divided members of the same nation to "organize nations not in territorial bodies but in simple association of persons", thus radically disjoining the nation from the territory and making of the nation a non-territorial association. The other ideological founders of the concept were another Austromarxist, Karl Renner, in his 1899 essay Staat und Nation (State and Nation), and the Jewish Labour Bundist Vladimir Medem, in his 1904 essay Di sotsial-demokratie un di natsionale frage (Social Democracy and the National Question).

== Medem ==
In his 1904 text, Medem exposed his version of the concept:

Let us consider the case of a country composed of several national groups, e.g. Poles, Lithuanians and Jews. Each national group would create a separate movement. All citizens belonging to a given national group would join a special organisation that would hold cultural assemblies in each region and a general cultural assembly for the whole country. The assemblies would be given financial powers of their own: either each national group would be entitled to raise taxes on its members, or the state would allocate a proportion of its overall budget to each of them. Every citizen of the state would belong to one of the national groups, but the question of which national movement to join would be a matter of personal choice and no authority would have any control over his decision. The national movements would be subject to the general legislation of the state, but in their own areas of responsibility they would be autonomous and none of them would have the right to interfere in the affairs of the others.

== Supporters ==
This principle was later adopted by various parties, among them the Jewish Socialist Workers Party from its foundation in 1906, the Jewish Labour Bund at its August 1912 Conference (when the motion "On National Cultural Autonomy" became part of the Bund's program), the Armenian social democrats, the Russian Constitutional Democratic Party (Kadets) at its June 1917's Ninth Congress, the first Ottoman then Greek Socialist Workers' Federation of Thessaloniki, the left-wing Zionists (Hashomer Hatzair) in favour of a binational solution in Palestine, the Jewish Folkspartei (inspired by Simon Dubnov, who had developed a concept of Jewish autonomy close to Bauer's), and the Democratic Union of Hungarians in Romania (DAHR) after 1989.

== Opponents ==
The whole concept was strongly opposed by the Bolsheviks. Stalin's pamphlet Marxism and the National Question (1913) was their ideological reference on the matter, along with Lenin's Critical Remarks on the National Question (December 1913), in particular in the chapter "Cultural-National Autonomy". (Stalin was later People's Commissar of Nationalities from 1917 - 1923.) Lenin's and Stalin's critiques of the national personal autonomy concept were later joined by the Catalan Andreu Nin in his article The Austrian School, National Emancipation Movements (1935).

== Implementation ==
It was adopted as an official policy in the short-lived Ukrainian People's Republic (1917–1920) and in the interwar Estonian Republic (1925 Law on Personal Autonomy), and it was included in the Declaration Concerning the Protection of Minorities in Lithuania by the League of Nations in 1925.

== See also ==
- Millet (Ottoman Empire)
- Jewish Autonomism - Kehilla - Asefat ha-Nivharim
- Non-territorial autonomy
- Non-territorial language policy
- Consociationalism
- Plurinationalism
- Panarchy (political philosophy)
