= Folkspartei =

Jewish Autonomist movement in Eastern Europe during the early 20th century

Folkspartei ייִדישע פֿאָלקספּאַרטײַ
- Founded: 1905
- Dissolved: 1939
- Headquarters: Poland; Lithuania
- Ideology: Jewish Autonomism; National personal autonomism Non-Zionism; Economic liberalism

The Folkspartei (Yiddish: ייִדישע פֿאָלקספּאַרטײַ, romanized: Yidishe Folkspartay, lit. 'Jewish People's Party') was a Jewish Autonomist movement founded after the 1905 pogroms in the Russian Empire by Simon Dubnow and Israel Efrojkin. The party took part in several elections in Poland and Lithuania in the 1920s and 1930s and did not survive the Holocaust.

== Ideology ==
According to the historian Simon Dubnow (1860-1941), Jews are a nation on the spiritual and intellectual level and should strive towards their national and cultural autonomy in the Jewish diaspora (Yiddish goles) in some way a secularized and modernized version of the Council of Four Lands under the Polish–Lithuanian Commonwealth. He said, "How then should Jewish autonomy assert itself? It must, of course, be in full agreement with the character of the Jewish national idea. Jewry, as a spiritual or cultural nation, cannot in the Diaspora seek territorial or political separatism, but only a social or a national-cultural autonomy."

Close to the General Jewish Labour Bund for the emphasis on Yiddish and its culture, it differed from that party by its middle class, craftsmen and intellectual base, also because of its socioeconomic beliefs. According to Dubnov, Jewish assimilation was not a natural phenomenon and the Jewish political struggle should be centered on a Jewish autonomy based upon community, language and education, and not upon class struggle as advocated by Bundist theorists. It was a liberal party in economic matters, committed to political democracy and secularism.

== Folkspartei in Ukraine ==
The Folkist Ya'akov Ze'ev Latsky ("Bertoldi") (former member of the Zionist Socialist Workers Party) was appointed Minister for Jewish Affairs in the Ukrainian People's Republic in April 1918, replacing Fareynikte Moishe Zilberfarb. He was succeeded by Abraham Revutzky of Poale Zion.

== Folkspartei in Poland ==
A local organization and a newspaper, Warszawer Togblat (The Warsaw Daily), was set up in Warsaw in 1916 in order to contend for the municipal elections (under German occupation), where they gained 4 seats, including Noach Pryłucki, one of the founders of the party's newspaper, later renamed as 'Der Moment'. He was also elected at the 1919 Constituent Sejm, but had to resign due to a citizenship matter. In the 1922-27 Polish Parliament (Sejm) Noach Pryłucki was the only Folkist MP out of 35 Jewish MPs (25 Zionists, but no Bundist). He was elected on the list of the Bloc of National Minorities. The party split in 1927 between the Warsaw branch, led by Pryłucki, and the Vilnius (then a part of Poland) branch, led by Dr. Zemach Shabad, less hostile to Zionism than the Warsaw branch but more Yiddish-centered. After the split the party seems to have declined, with an attempt to revitalize it in Warsaw in 1935. At the 1936 Jewish community elections in Warsaw, the Folkspartei only got 1 seat out of 50, while the Bund got 15.

== Folkspartei in Lithuania ==
Lawyer and banker Shmuel Landau (also spelled Landoi), later municipal councillor in Ponevezh (Lit. Panevėžys), was elected (or rather succeeded elected MP Naphtali Friedman, a nonpartisan lawyer, after his death) for the Folkspartei on a common Jewish electoral list (with the Zionist parties and Agudat Israel) at the first elected Lithuanian Parliament (Seimas) in 1920 when there were 6 Jewish parties deputies out of 112.

Vilnius (Yiddish: Vilne), where Jews formed the majority of the population, was incorporated into Poland in 1922–1939, and also sent at least one Folkist to the Polish Parliament (Sejm), Zemach Shabad (Szabad, 1864-1935).

The next elections (1922) were rigged against the Polish and Jewish minorities, but the Seimas was dissolved and another Folkist, the lawyer Oizer Finkelstein (also spelled Euser), was elected in 1923 on a national minorities bloc. In 1926, it ran with Zionist factions but in the same year, a coup d'état took place in Lithuania and the parliament was dissolved in 1927.

The Folkist newspaper in interwar Lithuania was the Folksblat, published in Kaunas.

== See also ==
- Jewish Autonomism
- National personal autonomy
- Benno Straucher

== Sources ==
- C. Bezalel Sherman, Bund, Galuth nationalism, Yiddishism, Herzl Institute Pamphlet no.6, New York, 1958
- Mitchell Cohen, Ber Borochov and Socialist Zionism (From the introduction to Class Struggle and the Jewish Nation: Selected Essays in Marxist Zionism by Ber Borochov; Mitchell Cohen, ed. Transacation Books:1984)
- Joseph Marcus, Social and Political History of the Jews in Poland, 1919–1939, Mouton Publishers, Berlin - New York - Amsterdam
- Joseph Rosin, Mariampol (Marijampole)
- The Holocaust revealed, Lithuania
