= Moishe Zilberfarb =

Ukrainian politician and diplomat

Moishe Zylberfarb Мо́йше Ісакович Зи́льберфарб

Minister of Jewish Affairs
- In office 28 June 1917 – 31 January 1918
- Prime Minister: Volodymyr Vynnychenko
- Preceded by: post created
- Succeeded by: Ze'ev-Wolf Latzky-Bartholdi

Personal details
- Born: 1876 Rivne, Volhynia Governorate, Russian Empire
- Died: 1934 (aged 57–58) Warsaw, Poland
- Party: Fareynikte
- Occupation: statesman, diplomat, writer

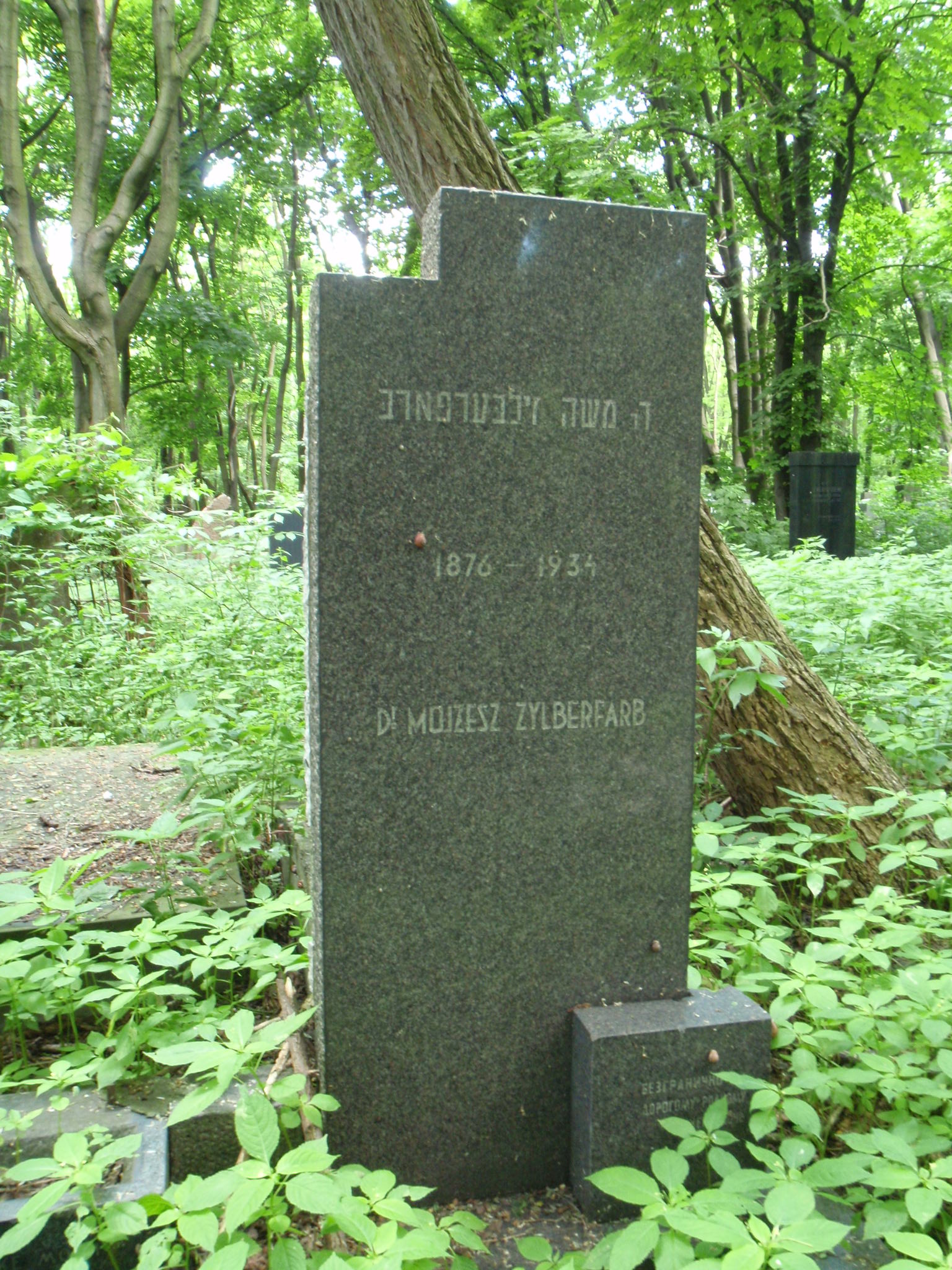
Zylberfarb's grave in Warsaw

Moishe Zylberfarb (Ukrainian: Мо́йше Зи́льберфарб; Russian: Моисе́й Исаа́кович Зи́льберфарб; Yiddish: משה זילבערפֿאַרב) was a Ukrainian politician, diplomat, and public activist of Jewish descent. He was one of the authors of the Law of Ukraine about national-individual autonomy (1918) which later was canceled by the Communist regime.

== Brief biography ==
Zylberfarb was born in Rovno in 1876. In 1898, he graduated from the Zhytomyr Gymnasium, and afterwords he started studying at the Kyiv Polytechnic Institute. In 1902, he earned the Faculty of Medicine at Berlin University, where he also studied at until 1904. In addition to this, he earned a Doctor of Law degree in 1904.

In 1906 he became a founder of the group Vozrozhdenie and the Jewish Socialist Workers Party (SERP). From the very beginning he was a member of the Central Council of Ukraine (March 1917) as member of the United Jewish Socialist Workers Party. Zylberfarb was a member of Little Council. On 27 July 1917 he became a Jewish representative at the General Secretariat of Ukraine (regional government of the Russian Republic). During the October Revolution Zylberfarb became a member of the Regional Committee in Protection of Revolution in Ukraine. After the independence of Ukraine, Zylberfarb became a Minister of Jewish Affairs in Ukraine. After briefly being arrested in August 1918 under Pavlo Skoropadsky, from 1918 to 1920 he served as a rector at the Jewish National University and the Society in support of development of Jewish Culture (Culture League) in Kiev.

In 1921 Zylberfarb moved to Warsaw where he headed ORT and was chairman of the Society of Artisans and Farmers' Labour among Jews in Russia. In Poland, towards the final years of his life, he joined the General Jewish Labour Bund in Poland and was published in Bundist journals. He died in Otwock in 1934, and was buried in Warsaw.

== Works ==
- Jewish ministry and Jewish autonomy in Ukraine (1919)
