= Jewish Socialist Workers Party =

Jewish Socialist Workers Party Социалистическая еврейская рабочая партия
- Founded: April 1906
- Merged into: FYSAP
- Ideology: Socialism; National personal autonomism
- Political position: Left-wing

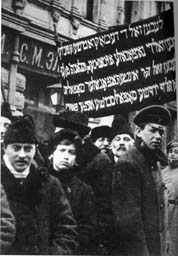
1917 Seymist rally

The Jewish Socialist Workers Party (Russian: Социалистическая еврейская рабочая партия, 'SERP', which means 'sickle' in Russian), often nicknamed Seymists, was a Jewish socialist political party in the Russian Empire. The party was founded in April 1906, emerging out of the Vozrozhdenie (Renaissance) circles. The Vozrozhdenie was a non-Marxist tendency which was led by the nonmarxist thinker and politician Chaim Zhitlowsky. Zhitlowsky became the theoretician of the new party that advocated with the same emphasis Jewish self-reliance and socialism. Leaders of the party included Avrom Rozin (Ben-Adir), Nokhem Shtif, Moyshe Zilberfarb and Mark Ratner. The party was close to the Socialist-Revolutionary Party (PSR).

The party favored the idea of a Jewish National Assembly (a Seym). It envisaged a federation of nationalities in Russia, each led by an elected body of representatives with political powers inside their community. At a later stage, the Jews would seek territorial concentration.

The party actively supported Yiddish language and culture. The party published the Yiddish-language newspaper Folks-shtime ('People's Voice') from Kiev and Vilna. The party also published the organ Vozrozhdenie.

During the 1906 period, the party had 3,000 of its cadres organized in paramilitary self-defense units. However, about 400 of them were killed or wounded in fighting and 1,000 arrested.

In 1907 a formal alliance between SERP and the PSR was signed, making SERP a sub-section of the PSR. The alliance was however mainly the product of the relations between Zhitlowsky and Mark Ratner, and did not have full support from the SERP grassroots. Many local SERP branches wanted unity with the Marxist groups rather than the PSR. Through the link-up with PSR, SERP was included in the Second International. Just after the deal with PSR, SERP gained a consultative vote at the 1907 Stuttgart congress of the International.

In 1911 SERP, Zionist Socialist Workers Party and Poalei Zion signed a joint appeal to the International Socialist Bureau, asking the International to recognize the national character of the Jewish people.

In 1917 the party merged with the Zionist Socialist Workers Party, forming the United Jewish Socialist Workers Party.
