= Nachman Syrkin =

Lithuanian-Jewish political theorist

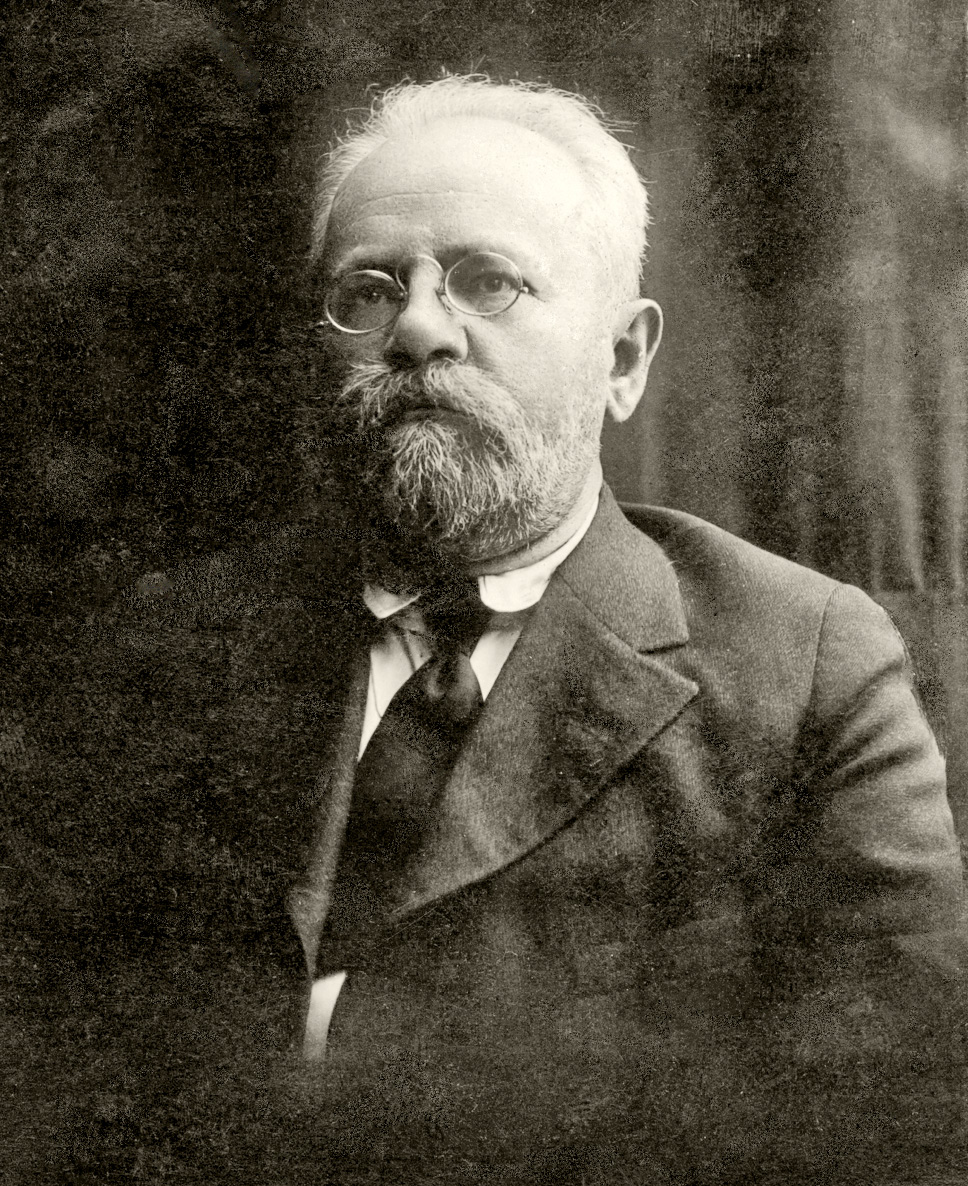
- Nachman Syrkin
- Born: Russian: Нахман Сыркин; 11 February 1868; Mogilev, Russian Empire (now Belarus)
- Died: 6 September 1924 (aged 56); New York City, U.S.
- Other name: Nahman Syrkin
- Political party: Zionist Socialist Workers Party; Poale Zion
- Spouse: Bassya Syrkin (née Osnos)
- Children: Marie Syrkin

Nachman Syrkin (also spelled Nahman Syrkin; Russian: Нахман Сыркин; 11 February 1868 – 6 September 1924) was a political theorist, founder of Labor Zionism and a prolific writer in the Hebrew, Yiddish, Russian, German and English languages.

== Biography ==
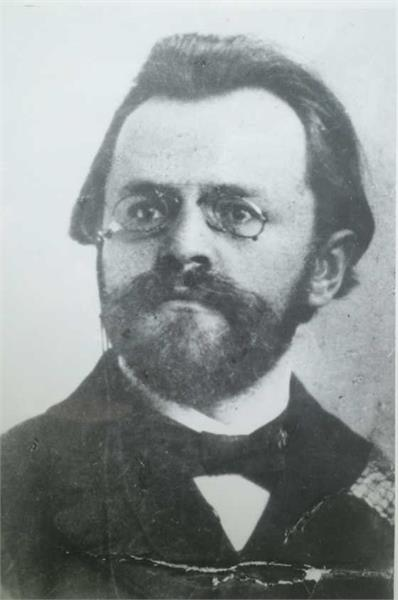
Nachman Syrkin

Nachman Syrkin was born to a Lithuanian Jewish family in Mogilev, Russian Empire (now Belarus). He was influenced by Hovevei Zion and socialism in his youth and dedicated himself to synthesizing the two concepts. In this task he was joined by Ber Borochov. Syrkin's daughter Marie was a noted writer, educator and American Zionist activist.

== Zionist career ==
Syrkin was one of the leaders of the Labor Zionist faction at the First Zionist Congress in 1897 and was an early proponent of the Jewish National Fund. He was also the first person to propose that Jewish immigrants to Palestine form collective settlements.

Unlike other socialist thinkers of the time, Syrkin was comfortable with his Jewish heritage and, although he does not spell it out explicitly in his essay "The Jewish Question and the Jewish Socialist State" (1898), it is clear that he had in mind the biblical emphasis on strict social justice, irrespective of wealth, power or privilege. However, he saw Zionism as a replacement for traditional Judaism:

The new, Zionist Judaism stands in complete contrast to the Judaism of exile … Zionism uproots religious Judaism in a stronger way than Reform or assimilation, by creating new standards of 'Judaism' which will constitute a new ideology that can be elevated to the status of a religion.

In "The Jewish Question and the Socialist Jewish State," Syrkin sought to reconcile his conception of socialism and his strong devotion to Zionism, arguing against what he considered bourgeois Zionists, such as Theodor Herzl, that only the Jewish working class could realize Zionism. He also argued against anti-Zionist Jewish socialists that there could be no solution to the Jewish question and European antisemitism without the creation of a Jewish state.

Syrkin worked to establish Labor Zionist groups throughout Central Europe. After studying and working in Germany and France and after being banned from Germany in 1904, Syrkin returned to Russia after the Russian Revolution of 1905. He took part at the 1905 Basle Seventh Zionist Congress as a delegate of the new Zionist Socialist Workers Party.

In 1919, Syrkin was a member of the American Jewish delegation to the Versailles Peace Conference. He was also a leading figure in the World Poale Zion conference that year and was given the task of visiting Palestine to develop a plan for kibbutz settlement. He intended to relocate to Palestine, but died of a heart attack in 1924 in New York City.

== Legacy ==
In 1951, his remains were buried in the Kibbutz Kinneret beside the other founders of Labor Zionism. Kfar Sirkin, founded in 1933 close to Petach Tikva, is named for him.

== Published works (English) ==
- Essays on socialist Zionism (New York, Young Poale Zion Alliance of America, 1935, 64p). Includes:
  - The Jewish Question and the Jewish Socialist State (1898)
  - National independence and international unity (1917)
