= Simon Dubnow =

Russian writer and activist (1860–1941)

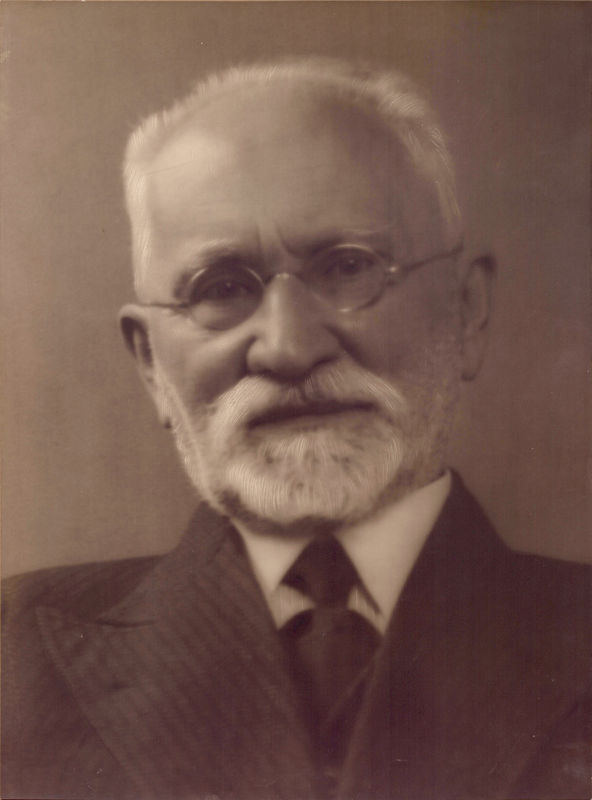
- Born: Shimon Meyerovich Dubnow; September 10, 1860; Mstsislaw, Russian Empire (now Belarus)
- Died: December 8, 1941 (aged 81); Riga, Latvia
- Occupations: Historian, writer and activist

Simon Dubnow (alternatively spelled Dubnov; Yiddish: שמעון דובנאָװ, romanized: Shimen Dubnov; Russian: Семён Ма́ркович Ду́бнов, romanized: Semyon Markovich Dubnov, IPA: [sʲɪˈmʲɵn ˈmarkəvʲɪdʑ ˈdubnəf]; 10 September 1860 – 8 December 1941) was a Jewish-Russian historian, writer and activist.

== Life and career ==
In 1860, Simon Dubnow was born Shimon Meyerovich Dubnow (Шимон Меерович Дубнов) to a large poor family in the Belarusian town of Mstsislaw (Mogilev Region). A native Yiddish speaker, he received a traditional Jewish education in a heder and a yeshiva, where Hebrew was regularly spoken. Later Dubnow entered into a kazyonnoye yevreyskoe uchilishche (state Jewish school) where he learned Russian. In the midst of his education, the May Laws eliminated these Jewish institutions, and Dubnow was unable to graduate; Dubnow persevered, independently pursuing his interests in history, philosophy, and linguistics. He was particularly fascinated by Heinrich Graetz and the Wissenschaft des Judentums movement.

In 1880 Dubnow used forged documents to move to St Petersburg, officially off-limits to Jews. Jews were generally restricted to small towns in the Pale of Settlement, unless they had been discharged from the military, were employed as doctors or dentists, or could prove they were 'cantonists', university graduates or merchants belonging to the 1st guild. Here he married Ida Friedlin.

Soon after moving to St. Petersburg Dubnow's publications appeared in the press, including the leading Russian–Jewish magazine Voskhod. In 1890, the Jewish population was expelled from the capital city, and Dubnow too was forced to leave. He settled in Odesa and continued to publish studies of Jewish life and history, coming to be regarded as an authority in these areas.

Throughout his active participation in the contemporary social and political life of the Russian Empire, Dubnow called for modernizing Jewish education, organizing Jewish self-defense against pogroms, and demanding equal rights for Russian Jews, including the right to vote. Living in Vilna, Lithuania, during the early months of 1905 Russian Revolution, he became active in organizing a Jewish political response to opportunities arising from the new civil rights which were being promised. In this effort he worked with a variety of Jewish opinion, e.g., those favouring diaspora autonomy, Zionism, socialism, and assimilation.

In 1906 he was allowed back into St Petersburg, where he founded and directed the Jewish Literature and Historical-Ethnographic Society and edited the Jewish Encyclopedia. In the same year, he founded the Folkspartei (Jewish People's Party) with Israel Efrojkin, which successfully worked for the election of MPs and municipal councilors in interwar Lithuania and Poland. After 1917 Dubnow became a professor of Jewish history at Petrograd University.

He welcomed the first February Revolution of 1917 in Russia, regarding it, according to scholar Robert van Voren, as having "brought the long-anticipated liberation of the Jewish people", although he "felt uneasy about the increasing profile of Lenin". Dubnow did not consider such Bolsheviks as Trotsky (Bronstein) to be Jewish, stating: "They appear under Russian pseudonyms because they are ashamed of their Jewish origins (Trotsky, Zinoviev, others). But it would be better to say that their Jewish names are pseudonyms; they are not rooted in our people."

In 1922 Dubnow emigrated to Kaunas, Lithuania, and later to Berlin. His magnum opus was the ten-volume World History of the Jewish people, first published in German translation in 1925–1929. Of its significance, historian Koppel Pinson writes:

With this work Dubnow took over the mantle of Jewish national historian from Graetz. Dubnow's Weltgeschichte may in truth be called the first secular and purely scholarly synthesis of the entire course of Jewish history, free from dogmatic and theological trappings, balanced in its evaluation of the various epochs and regional groupings of Jewish historical development, fully cognizant of social and economic currents and influences ...

During 1927 Dubnow initiated a search in Poland for pinkeysim (record books kept by Kehillot and other local Jewish groups) on behalf of the Yidisher Visnshaftlekher Institut (YIVO, Jewish Scientific Institute), while he was Chairman of its Historical Section. This spadework for the historian netted several hundred writings; one pinkes dated to 1601, that of the Kehillah of Opatów.

In August 1933, after Hitler came to power, Dubnow moved to Riga, Latvia. He chose Latvia in part for its government's support for Jewish self-reliance and the vigorous Jewish community in the small country. There existed a Jewish theater, various Jewish newspapers, and a network of Yiddish-language schools. There his wife died, yet he continued his activities, writing his autobiography Book of My Life, and participating in YIVO, the Institute for Jewish Research. On the initiative of a Latvian Jewish refugee activist in Stockholm and with help from the local Jewish community in Sweden, Dubnow was granted a visa to Sweden in the summer of 1940 but for unknown reasons he never used it. Then in July 1941 Nazi troops occupied Riga. Dubnow was evicted, losing his entire library. With thousands of Jews, he was transferred to the Riga Ghetto. According to the few remaining survivors, Dubnow repeated to ghetto inhabitants: Yidn, shraybt un farshraybt (Yiddish: Jews", write and record"). He was among thousands of Jews to be rounded up there for the Rumbula massacre. Too sick to travel to the forest, he was murdered in the city on 8 December 1941. Several friends then buried Simon Dubnow in the old cemetery of the Riga Ghetto.

== Political ideals ==
Dubnow was ambivalent toward Zionism, which he felt was an opiate for the spiritually feeble. Despite being sympathetic to the movement's ideas, he believed its ultimate goal, the establishment of a Jewish state in Palestine achieved with international support and substantial Jewish immigration, to be politically, socially, and economically impossible, calling it "a beautiful messianic dream". In 1898, he projected that by the year 2000, there would only be about 500,000 Jews living in Palestine. Dubnow thought Zionism just another sort of messianism, and he thought the possibility of persuading the Jews of Europe to move to Palestine and establish a state fantastical. Beyond improbability, he worried that this impulse would drain energy away from the task of creating an autonomous Jewish center in the diaspora.

Much stronger than his skepticism towards Zionism, Dubnow rejected assimilation. He believed that the future survival of the Jews as a nation depended on their spiritual and cultural strength, where they resided dispersed in the diaspora. Dubnow wrote: "Jewish history [inspires] the conviction that Jewry at all times, even in the period of political independence, was pre-eminently a spiritual nation," and he called the push for assimilation "national suicide".

His formulated ideology became known as Jewish Autonomism, once widely popular in eastern Europe, being adopted in its various derivations by Jewish political parties such as the Bund and his Folkspartei. Autonomism involved a form of self-rule in the Jewish diaspora, which Dubnow called "the Jewish world-nation". The Treaty of Versailles (1919) adopted a version of it in the minority provisions of treaties signed with new east European states. Yet in early 20th-century Europe, many political currents began to trend against polities that accommodated a multiethnic pluralism, as grim monolithic nationalism or ideology emerged as centralizing principles. After the Holocaust, and the founding of Israel, for a while discussion of Autonomism seemed absent from Jewish politics.

== Regional history ==
Dubnow's political thought perhaps can better be understood in light of historical Jewish communal life in Eastern Europe. It flourished during the early period of the Polish–Lithuanian Commonwealth (1569–1795), when it surpassed the Ottoman Empire and western Europe as a center of Judaism. Dubnow here describes the autonomous social-economic and religious organization developed by the Jewish people under the Commonwealth government:

Constituting an historical nationality, with an inner life of its own, the Jews were segregated by the Government as a separate estate, an independent social body. ... They formed an entirely independent class of citizens, and as such were in need of independent agencies of self-government and jurisdiction. The Jewish community constituted not only a national and cultural, but also a civil, entity. It formed a Jewish city within a Christian city, with its separate forms of life, its own religious, administrative, judicial, and charitable institutions. The Government of a country with sharply divided estates could not but legalize the autonomy of the Jewish Kahal." The Jews also did not speak Polish, but rather Yiddish, an Hebraicized German. "The sphere of the Kahal's activity was very large." "The capstone of this Kahal organization were the so-called Waads, the conferences or assemblies of rabbis and Kahal leaders. [They became] the highest court of appeal." Their activity "passed, by gradual expansion, from the judicial sphere into that of administration and legislation.

Each provincial council or Waad (Hebrew vaad: committee) eventually joined with others to form a central governing body which began to meet regularly. Its name became "ultimately fixed as the Council of the Four Lands (Waad Arba Aratzoth)." These four lands were: Wielkopolska (Posen), Malopolska (Cracow and Lubin), Ruthenia (Lviv (Lemberg)), and Volhynia (Ostroh and Kremenets); the fifth land Lithuania (Brest and Grodno) withdrew to form its own high Waad. The 'Council of the Four Lands' consisted of the six "leading rabbis of Poland" and a delegate from the principal Kahalem selected by their elders, in all about thirty members. "As a rule, the Council assembled in Lublin in early spring, between Purim and Passover, and in Yaroslav (Galicia) at the end of summer, before high holidays."

The Council or Wadd Arba Aratzoth "reminded one of the Sanhedrin, which in ancient days assembled... in the temple. They dispensed justice to all the Jews of the Polish realm, issued preventive measures and obligatory enactments (takkanoth), and imposed penalties as they saw fit. All difficult cases were brought before their court. To facilitate matters [the delegates appointed] 'provincial judges' (dayyane medinoth) to settle disputes concerning property, while they themselves [in plenary session] examined criminal cases, matters pertaining to hazaka (priority of possession) and other difficult matters of law." "The Council of the Four Lands was the guardian of Jewish civil interests in Poland. It sent its shtadlans to the residential city of Warsaw and other meeting-places of the Polish Diets for the purpose of securing from the king and his dignitaries the ratification of the ancient Jewish privileges. ... But the main energy of the Waad was directed toward the regulation of the inner life of the Jews. The statute of 1607, framed [by] the Rabbi of Lublin, is typical of this solicitude. [Its rules were] prescribed for the purpose of fostering piety and commercial integrity among the Jewish people.

This firmly-knit organization of communal self-government could not but foster among the Jews of Poland a spirit of discipline and obedience to the law. It had an educational effect on the Jewish populace, which was left by the Government to itself, and had no share in the common life of the country. It provided the stateless nation with a substitute for national and political self-expression, keeping public spirit and civic virtue alive in it, and upholding and unfolding its genuine culture.

Yet then the Polish–Lithuanian Commonwealth suffered grave problems of institutional imbalance. Eventually, the Commonwealth was removed from the map of Europe by successive partitions perpetrated by her three neighboring states, each an autocracy, the third and extinguishing partition coming in 1795. Following the Congress of Vienna (1815) the Russian Empire uneasily governed most of these Polish and Lithuanian lands, including the large Jewish populations long dwelling there. The Russian Empire first restricted Jewish residence to their pre-existing Pale of Settlement, and later began to further confine Jewish liberties and curtail their self-government. Not only were their rights attacked, but several of the Tzars allowed the imperial government to propagate and to instigate a series of murderous pogroms against the Jewish people of the realm.

In the cruel atmosphere of this ongoing political crisis in the region, Simon Dubnow wrote his celebrated histories and played an active rôle in Jewish affairs. He supported the broad movements for change in the Russian Empire; yet in the main he sought to restore and to continue the Jewish autonomy, described above at its zenith under the old Commonwealth, into the 20th century.

During his life various large and tragic events were to impact the region, which can be considered as the most horrific of places during the first half of the 20th century. Among these events, ranging from a few positive to news headlines to crimes against humanity, were: the pogroms, the co-opted 1905 Russian Revolution, the founding of the Folkspartei, the First World War, the February Revolution followed by the October Bolshevik, the Balfour Declaration, the Treaty of Brest-Litovsk, the Versailles Treaty, the Polish–Soviet War, the Weimar inflation, the U.S.A. Immigration Act of 1924, exile of Leon Trotsky by Joseph Stalin, the Soviet Gulag, the Great Depression, the Holodomor in Ukraine, the Nazi regime, the Nuremberg racial laws, Stalin's Great Purge, Kristallnacht, the 1939 White Paper, the Nazi–Soviet Pact, the Second World War, the Soviet-Nazi War, and the Shoah. The catastrophe of the genocide claimed the life of the aged historian.

== National values ==
Spiritual values were highly esteemed by Dubnow, who viewed the Jewish people as leaders in their advancement. In his Weltgeschichte he discusses the ancient rivalry between Sadducee and Pharisee, as a contest between the ideal of a political nation versus a spiritual nation. He favored the latter, and mounted a critique of the warlike policies of Alexander Jannaeus (r. 103-76 BCE), a king of the Jewish Hasmonean dynasty (167-63 BCE), which was founded by the Maccabees:

This was not the kind of state dreamed of by their predecessors, the hasidim, when the independence of Judea was attained and when the star of the Hasmoneans first began to gleam. Had Judea battled against the Syrian yoke, sacrificed for a quarter of a century its material goods and the blood of its best sons, only in order to become, after attaining independence, a 'despotism' or warrior state after the fashion of its pagan neighbors? The Pharisees believed that the Jewish nation was created for something better; that in its political life it was not to strive for the ideal of brute force but rather for the lofty ideal of inner social and spiritual progress.

Not only is there the issue of inner purpose and drive of the communal life of a nation, but also of the ethics of nationalism, relations between nations. Dubnow writes: "There is absolutely no doubt that Jewish nationalism in its very essence has nothing in common with any tendency toward violence." Because of the diaspora experience, "as a Jew, I utter the word 'national' with pride and conviction, because I know my people... is not able to aspire anywhere to primacy and dominance. My nationalism can be only a pure form...." The prophets "called Israel a 'light to the nations' [and taught] the spiritual mission of the people of Israel... to bring other peoples, that is, all 'mankind,' to spiritual perfection." Thus, the nation inspired by Judaism, "the descendants of the Prophets," will promote and inspire the social ethics of humanity, and will come to harmonize with its realization: "the equal worth of all nations in the family of mankind." The "Jewish national idea, which can never become aggressive and warlike" will raise aloft its flag, which symbolizes the joining of the prophetic vision of "truth and justice with the noble dream of the unity of mankind."

Scholar Baruch Kimmerling describes Dubnow as having "fused nationalism, internationalism, and secular Jewishness into a non-Zionist, non–territorially dependent cultural nationalism."

== Jewish History ==
Earlier in a long and well-regarded essay, Dubnow wrote about the "two halves" of Jewish history. The first "seems to be but slightly different from the history of other nations." But if we "pierce to its depths" we find a spiritual people. "The national development is based upon an all-pervasive religious tradition... embracing a luminous theory of life and an explicit code of morality and social converse." Their history reveals that the Jewish people "has been called to guide the other nations toward sublime moral and religious principles, and to officiate for them, the laity as it were, in the capacity of priests." "The Prophets were the real and appointed executors of the holy command enjoining the 'conversion' of all Jews into 'a kingdom of priests and a holy nation'." After the close of the Tanakh era in Israel, this first half of their history, the "strength and fertility" of the Jews as a spiritual nation "reached a culminating point".

Yet then "the providence of history" changed everything and scattered them "to all ends of the earth". "State, territory, army, the external attributes of national power" became a "superfluous luxury" for the Jews, a hardy and persevering people. Already in the Biblical times, their "character had been sufficiently tempered", they had learned how to "bear the bitterest of hardships" and were "equipped with an inexhaustible store of energy", thus they could survive, "live for centuries, yea, for thousands of years" under challenging conditions in ethnic enclaves mostly in Southwest Asia and later throughout Europe, during their post-Biblical "second half".

"Uprooted from its political soil, national life displayed itself [in the] intellectual fields exclusively. 'To think and to suffer' became the watchword of the Jewish people." They brought their "extraordinary mental energy" to the task. "The spiritual discipline of the school came to mean for the Jew what military discipline is for other nations." Dubnow notes that the Jewish people without an army live as if in a future world where nations no longer rise up against each other in war. Hence, for the Jews, their history has become "spiritual strivings" and cultural contributions. "If the inner life and social and intellectual development of a people form the kernel of history, and politics and occasional wars are but its husk, then certainly the history of the Jewish Diaspora is all kernel."

"In spite of the noteworthy features that raise Jewish history above the level of the ordinary and assign it a peculiar place, it is nevertheless not isolated, not severed from the history of mankind." These "pilgrim people scattered in all the countries" are "most intimately interwoven with world-affairs". On the negative, when "the powers of darkness and fanaticism held sway" the Jews were subject to "persecutions, infringement of the liberty of conscience, inquisitions, violence of every sort." Yet when "enlightenment and humanity" prevailed in the neighborhood, the Jews were to benefit by "the intellectual and cultural stimulus proceeding from the peoples with whom they entered into close relations." Across the centuries in our history, such tides seem to ebb and flow.

On its side, Jewry made its personality felt among the nations by its independent, intellectual activity, its theory of life, its literature, by the very fact indeed, of its ideal staunchness and tenacity, its peculiar historical physiognomy. From this reciprocal relation issued a great cycle of historical events and spiritual currents, making the past of the Jewish people an organic constituent of the past of all that portion of mankind which has contributed to the treasury of human thought.

Dubnow states that the Jewish people in the first Biblical half of its history "finally attained to so high a degree of spiritual perfection and fertility that the creation of a new religious theory of life, which eventually gained universal supremacy, neither exhausted its resources nor ended its activity." In its second "lackland" half the Jews were "a people accepting misery and hardship with stoic calm, combining the characteristics of the thinker with those of the sufferer, and eking out existence under conditions which no other nation has found adequate." For this people "the epithet 'peculiar' has been conceded" and Jewish history "presents a phenomenon of undeniable uniqueness."

== Philosophy ==
In a short article, Dubnow presented a memorable portrait of historical depth, and its presence in contemporary life:

Every generation in Israel carries within itself the remnants of worlds created and destroyed during the course of the previous history of the Jewish people. The generation, in turn, builds and destroys worlds in its form and image, but in the long run continues to weave the thread that binds all the links of the nation into the chain of generations. ... Thus each generation in Israel is more the product of history than it is its creator. ... We, the people of Israel living today, continue the long thread that stretches from the days of Hammurabi and Abraham to the modern period. ... We see further that during the course of thousands of years the nations of the world have borrowed from our spiritual storehouse and added to their own without depleting the source. ... The Jewish people goes its own way, attracting and repelling, beating out for itself a unique path among the routes of the nations of the world... .

Another writer of Jewish history although from a younger generation, Lucy Dawidowicz, summarizes the personal evolution and resulting weltanschauung of Simon Dubnow:

Early in his intellectual life, Dubnow turned to history and in the study and writing of Jewish history he found the surrogate for Judaism, the modern means by which he could identify as a Jew, which would give him inner satisfaction and keep him part of the Jewish community. ... Even in his pioneering studies of hasidism, Dubnow's rationalism shines through. ... Yet despite his rationalism, despite his modernity, Dubnow believed in a mystic force--the Jewish will to live.

Dubnow himself adumbrates his own philosophical and religious understanding: "I am agnostic in religion and in philosophy.... I myself have lost faith in personal immortality, yet history teaches me that there is a collective immortality and that the Jewish people can be considered as relatively eternal for its history coincides with the full span of world history." Pinson writes "Dubnow with his profound historical approach, weaves into his autonomist theories all the strands of Jewish past, present and future."

== Dubnow Institute in Leipzig ==
In honor of Simon Dubnow and as a center for undertaking research on Jewish culture, in 1995, the Leibniz Institute for Jewish History and Culture – Simon Dubnow was founded. It is an interdisciplinary institute for the research of Jewish lived experience in Central and Eastern Europe from the Early Modern Period to the present day. The Dubnow Institute is dedicated to the secular tradition of its namesake. At the Dubnow Institute, Jewish history is always regarded in the context of its non-Jewish environs and as a seismograph of general historical developments. The institute is contributing courses to several degree programs of Leipzig University and offers a Ph.D. research scheme.

== See also ==
- History of the Jews in Russia and Soviet Union
- Timeline of Jewish history
- Dubnow Park in Tel Aviv (named after Simon Dubnow)

== Bibliography ==
=== Published titles ===
- World History of the Jewish People. His Russian manuscript История еврейского народа translated into German by Dr. A. Steinberg, published as: Weltgeschichte des Jüdischen Volkes (Berlin: Jüdischer Verlag 1925–1929), in ten volumes. Published in Russian (1936). Hebrew: Divre Yemei 'Am 'Olam (Berlin, Tel Aviv: Dvir 1923–1940), ten volumes. English: see below.
- The newest history of the Jewish people, 1789–1914. German: Die neueste Geschichte des Jüdischen Volkes (Berlin: Jüdischer Verlag 1920–1923), three volumes. Russian: Новейшая история еврейского народа, in three volumes, updated in 1938.
- The ancient history of the Jewish people. German: Die Alte Geschichte des Jüdischen Volkes (Berlin: Jüdischer Verlag 1925–1930), 7 vols.
- Jewish history textbook. Russian: Учебник еврейской истории, in 3 volumes, 1901. English: see below.
- Jewish history for school and home. Yiddish: Idishe Geshikhte far Shul un Haym (Riga 1934). French: Précis d'histoire juive des origines à nos jours (Paris 1936). Portuguese: Historia Judáica (Rio de Janeiro: Circulo Bibliofilo Hebráico 1948), 543 pp. Spanish: "Manual de la Historia Judía" (Buenos Aires: Editorial S. Sigal, seven editions through 1970), 672 pp.
- A History of Hassidism, 3 vols; Yiddish: Geshikhte fun khasidizm (Vilna 1930). Hebrew: Toldot ha-hasidut (Tel Aviv 1930–1932). German: Geschichte des Chassidismus (Berlin 1931–1932). Spanish: Historia del Jasidismo (Buenos Aires: Conferación Pro-Cultura Judía 1976).
- Records of the Lithuanian Council. Hebrew: Pinkas Medinat Lita (Berlin 1925).
- Book of Simon Dubnow. Hebrew: Sefer Shimon Dubnov (London, Jerusalem: 1954), essays and letters, edited by S. Rawidowicz.
- Book of My life. Russian: Моя жизнь or Kniga zhizni (Riga: Jaunátnes Gramata 1934–1935), three volumes. German: Buch des Leben (Berlin 1937; Göttingen: Vandenhoeck Ruprecht 2004), three volumes; selections: Mein Leben (Berlin 1937). Yiddish: Dos bukh fun mayn lebn (New York-Buenos Aires: Congress for Jewish Culture 1962–1963), three volumes.

=== In English ===
- History of the Jews (South Brunswick, NJ: T. Yoseloff 1967–1973) in 5 volumes, translated from Russian by M. Spiegel of the ten-volume, 4th edition Istoriia Evreiskogo Naroda (History of the Jewish People).
- Nationalism and History. Essays on old and new Judaism (Philadelphia: Jewish Publication Society of America 1958), edited [collected, introduced, partly translated] by Koppel S. Pinson. [The "External Links" below provide limited access to some of its contents.]
- A Short History of the Jewish People (London: M. L. Cailingold 1936), two volumes, translation by David Mowshowitch of the Russian Uchebnik evreiskoi istorii (1901).
- History of the Jews in Russia and Poland. From the earliest times until the present day (Philadelphia: Jewish Publication Society of America 1916–1920), three volumes, translated by Israel Friedlaender.
- Jewish History. An essay in the philosophy of history (London: Macmillan 1903), translated from Russian to German by Israel Friedlaender, then from German to English by Henrietta Szold, 62 pages. Reprint 2004. First published in the Jewish journal Voskhod (St. Petersburg 1893). [English translation included by the editor Pinson (1958): see above.]
- In Jewish Encyclopedia (New York 1903–04): "Council of the Four Lands" IV:304-308; "Jocob Frank" V:475-478; "Hasidism" VI:251-258.
- Two short excerpts from his autobiography (Riga 1934–1935), translated from its Yiddish version (1962–1963), in Dawidowicz, editor, The Golden Tradition. Jewish Life and Thought in Eastern Europe (Boston: Beacon Press 1967): "Under the Sign of Historicism" at 232–242, and "Jewish Rights between Red and Black" at 461–470.

=== Commentary ===
- K. Groberg and A. Greenbaum, editors, A Missionary for History: essays in honor of Simon Dubnow (University of Minnesota 1998).
- A. Steinberg, editor, Simon Dubnow. L'homme et son oeuvre (Paris: Section Française de Congrés Juif Mondial 1963). Several languages.
- Josef Fraenkel, Dubnow, Herzl, and Ahad Ah-am: Political and cultural Zionism (London: Ararat Publishing Society 1963).
- Joshua Rothenberg, Shim'on Dubnov: tsu zayn hundert-yorikn geboyrntog (New York: Idish-natsyonaler arbeter farband 1961).
- YIVO Institute for Jewish Research, Simon Dubnow 1860-1941. Life & work of a Jewish historian (New York 1961), exhibition catalogue.
- Sofia Dubnova-Erlikh, Zhizn i tvorchestvo S. M. Dubnova (New York 1950), memoir and biography by his daughter, translated from the Russian as: The Life and Work of S. M. Dubnow. Diaspora nationalism and Jewish history (Indiana University & YIVO 1991); introduced by Jonathan Frankel, "S. M. Dubnow. Historian and Ideologist" at 1-33.
- Elias Tcherikower, editor, Simon Dubnov lekoved zayn finf um zibetsikstn yoyvl (Vilna: Yidisher Visnshaftlekher Institut 1937).
- Israel Friedlaender, Dubnow's Theory of Jewish Nationalism (New York: The Maccabaean Publishing Co. 1905).
