= Jewish Social Democratic Labour Party (Poalei Zion) =

- Founded: 1906
- Dissolved: 1928
- Newspaper: Der proletarisher gedank
- Ideology: Labor Zionism
- Political position: Left-wing
- International affiliation: Poalei Zion

The Jewish Social Democratic Labour Party (Poalei Zion) was a Zionist socialist political party in the Russian Empire and Ukraine. The party was founded in 1906 in Poltava. Members of the party participated in the government of Ukraine in 1917–20. It was part of the international Poalei Zion movement. Due to its position towards the October Revolution and being a strong supporter of the Russian Constituent Assembly, the party was banned from soviets dominated by the Bolsheviks, but did not fully dissolve until 1928.

The party suffered a major split in August 1919, when a dissident group formed the Jewish Communist Party (Poalei Zion). After the JCP(PZ) had merged into the Communist Party by 1922, the JSDLP(PZ) changed name to the Jewish Communist Labour Party (Poalei Zion) (known by its Yiddish acronym א.ק.א.פ. (פועלי ציון)). Its Yiddish organ, Der proletarisher gedank ('Proletarian Thought'), was published from Moscow between 1926 and 1927, replacing its Moscow central Russian organ Evreiskaya proletarskaya mysl ('Jewish Proletarian Thought', 1920–1926). The 12th conference of the party was held in Moscow March 11–18, 1926. The party opposed the policy of regionalization of the Soviet Union. The party had completely dissolved by 1928.

== Participation in Ukrainian politics ==
The party was represented in the Central Council of Ukraine in 1917 and in the Council of National Ministers of the Ukrainian National Republic (executive branch of the Ukrainian National Republic) the Poalist Abraham Revutsky was minister of Jewish affairs. Another Poalist, Solomon Goldelman, was deputy minister of trade and industry and of labour in the Directory of the Ukrainian National Republic (state authority created by the Ukrainian National Union on 14 November 1918).

== See also ==
- Jewish Communist Union (Poalei Zion)
- Jewish Communist Workers Youth Union (Iugend Poalei Zion)
- Mifleget Poale Zion VeHaHugim HaMarksistim beEretz Yisrael
