= Abraham Revusky =

Russian-born American writer

- Born: 1889; Smila, Cherkassky Uyezd, Kiev Governorate, Russian Empire
- Died: February 8, 1946 (aged 56–57); Yonkers, New York, U.S.

Abraham Revusky (1889 – February 8, 1946) was a Russian-born, US-based politician, author and editor. He was a contributing editor to the Jewish Morning Journal, and the author of several books.

== Life ==
Revusky was born in 1889 in Smila, in the Cherkassky Uyezd of the Kiev Governorate of the Russian Empire (present-day Ukraine). He grew up in Russia and Austria.

Revusky joined the Poale Zion party in Ukraine in the early 1910s. He moved to Odessa, where he was "an administrative member of the Jewish community" during the Russian Revolution of 1917, and the Ukrainian minister of Jewish Affairs for the Directorate of Ukraine in 1918. He lived in Palestine, later known as Israel, from 1920 to 1921, and he was a co-founder of the Histadrut. He was expelled from Mandatory Palestine by the British government in 1921, and he lived in Berlin until 1924, when he emigrated to the United States.

Revusky authored books in Yiddish and English, including a memoir of his time in Ukraine and a non-fiction book about Jews in Israel. He was also a contributing editor to the Jewish Morning Journal.

Revusky died on February 8, 1946, at his residence in Yonkers, New York, at age 58, leaving an estate valued at $8,812.

== Selected works ==
- Revusky, Abraham (1924). In di shṿere ṭeg oyf Uḳrayne. Berlin: Jüdischer Literarischer Verlag. OCLC 428439713.
  - Revusky, Abraham; Revusky, Sam; Kantorowitz., Moishe (1998). Wrenching Times in Ukraine: Memoir of a Jewish Minister. St. John's, Newfoundland, Canada: Yksuver Publishing. ISBN 9780968175118. OCLC 42882767.
- Revusky, Abraham (1935). Jews in Palestine. London, U.K.: King. OCLC 978097093.
- Revusky, Abraham (1938). The Histadrut (General Federation of Jewish Labor in Palestine): A Labor Commonwealth in the Making. New York City: League for labor Palestine. OCLC 692715.
- Revusky, Abraham (1947). Yidn in Eretz-Yisroel. New York City: Sharon. OCLC 7413582. (Published posthumously)
