= United Jewish Socialist Workers Party =

United Jewish Socialist Workers Party פֿאַראײניקטע ייִדישע סאָציאַליסטישע אַרבעטער־פּאַרטיי
- Founded: June 1917
- Dissolved: 1922
- Merger of: Zionist Socialist Workers Party; Jewish Socialist Workers Party
- Merged into: Independent Socialist Labour Party
- Newspaper: New Time
- Ideology: Socialism; National personal autonomism Yiddishism
- Political position: Left-wing

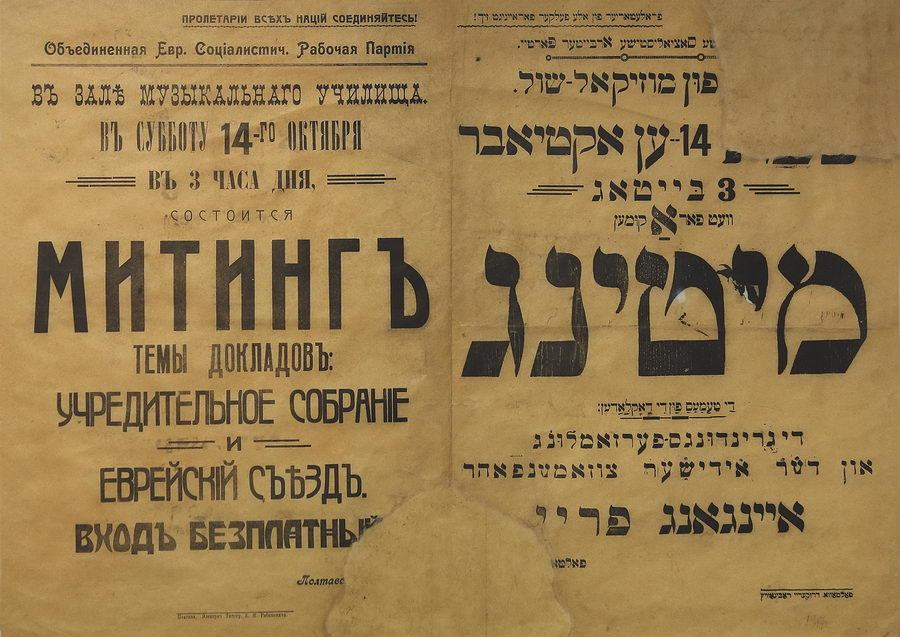
A Russian-Yiddish poster, announcing a Fareynikte party meeting on 27 October 1917 (14 October in old style) on the upcoming constituent assembly election.

The United Jewish Socialist Workers Party (Yiddish: פֿאַראײניקטע ייִדישע סאָציאַליסטישע אַרבעטער־פּאַרטיי, fareynikte yidishe sotsialistishe arbeter-partey) was a political party that emerged in Russia in the wake of the 1917 February Revolution. Members of the party along with the Poalei Zion participated in the government of Ukraine and condemned the October Revolution.

Its followers were generally known simply for the first portion of the name Fareynikte (פֿאַראײניקטע) - 'United'. Politically the party favored national personal autonomy for the Jewish community. The party upheld the ideas of building a secular Jewish community.

Fareynikte was founded in June 1917 through the merger of two groups, the Zionist Socialist Workers Party (SSRP) (Socialist-Territorialists) and the Jewish Socialist Workers Party (SERP). SERP's ideology was based particularly upon "autonomism". Some of the leaders from those two parties did not join Fareynikte, but rather became "Folkists" (Folkspartei). Both SSRP and SERP had emerged from the Vozrozhdenie group. As of early 1918, Fareynikte was the largest Jewish autonomist political party in the independent Ukraine.

The Faraynikte's program claimed "unity of the Jewish worker's class as an integral part of the 'extraterritorial' Jewish nation and international proletariat". The previous arguments in regard to the way of implementing the territorialists program have been declared as less important. The focal point of the party program was a "national-individual autonomy". For a brief period the party acquired major influence, particularly in Ukraine where it played an important role in an attempt to organize the Jewish national autonomy. In September 1917 Fareynikte petitioned to the Provisional Government to declare the equality of language.

In the 1917 elections in Russia, the party obtained around 8% of the Jewish votes. The party was also active in the Moldavian Democratic Republic, having one representative in the Sfatul Țării (Solomon Eigher).

Fareynikt Moishe Zilberfarb was Deputy-Secretary of Jewish Affairs in the General Secretariat of Ukraine, the main executive institution of the Ukrainian People's Republic from June 28, 1917 to January 22, 1918.

Fareynikte ran some Yiddish newspapers in Ukraine. It published the Naye tsayt (New Time) in Kiev from September 1917 to May 1919. Prior to publishing Naye tsayt, the party published Der yidisher proletarier from Kiev.

In Poland, dissidents from the Fareynikte party joined the Communist Party of Poland. The remainder of the party, which had taken the name Jewish Socialist Workers Party 'Ferajnigte' in Poland, merged into the Independent Socialist Labour Party in 1922.

== See also ==
- Biuro Centralne Bezpartyjnych Związków Zawodowych
