= Zionist Socialist Workers Party =

Zionist Socialist Workers Party Сионистско-социалистическая рабочая партия
- Founded: 1905
- Dissolved: 1917
- Merged into: FYSAP
- Headquarters: Kiev
- Ideology: Labor Zionism; Territorialism
- Political position: Left-wing

Zionist-Socialist Workers Party (Russian: Сионистско-социалистическая рабочая партия), often referred to simply as Zionist-Socialists or S.S. by their Russian initials, was a Jewish territorialist and socialist political party in the Russian Empire and Poland, that emerged from the Vozrozhdenie (Renaissance) group in 1904. The party held its founding conference in Odessa in 1905.

In the same year the party sent delegates, among them Nachman Syrkin, to the Basel Seventh Zionist Congress. However, while the mainstream Zionist movement rejected the idea of a Jewish state anywhere but in Eretz Yisrael, the Russian party favoured the idea of a Jewish territorial autonomy, outside of Palestine. Moreover, while territorial autonomy was the goal of the party, it dedicated most of its energy into revolutionary activities in Russia. Like other Russian revolutionary groups such as the Narodniks, the party was positive towards using terrorism as a means of struggle against the establishment.

Nachman Syrkin, Jacob Lestschinsky, Volf Latsky-Bartoldi and Shmuel Niger were among the leading figures of the party.

The party played an active role in the 1905 revolution.

At the 7th congress of the World Zionist Organization in 1905, the WZO formally rejected the 'Uganda Plan' (a proposal to resettle Jews in East Africa) after sharp debates. The party fell on the side of supporting Theodor Herzl and the Plan itself. In response, the party and other territorialists withdrew from the WZO.

The party grew rapidly, and became the second largest Jewish labour party after the Bund. The party organized 'neutral' trade unions, in opposition to the Bundist unions. In the end of 1906, the party claimed a membership of 27,000. However, after 1906 the influence of the party began to decline sharply. Many leaders went into exile in Western Europe. The central organ of the party was the weekly Yiddish newspaper Der nayer veg, published from Vilna 1906–1907. The newspaper was closed down by the authorities in 1907. After 1907, the Central Committee of the party existed in Kyiv but its activities were restricted in scope.

During the 1907 Stuttgart congress of the Second International, the International Socialist Bureau decided to give a consultative vote to the party at the congress. The decision was, however, overturned a year later.

In 1911 the Zionist Socialist Workers Party, the Jewish Socialist Workers Party and Poalei Zion signed a joint appeal to the International Socialist Bureau, asking the International to recognize the national character of the Jewish people.

In 1917 the party merged with the Jewish Socialist Workers Party, forming the United Jewish Socialist Workers Party.

== See also ==
- Klainer SS – a children's organization in the Russian Empire, tied to the Zionist Socialist Workers Party
