= Szmul Zygielbojm =

Polish Jewish politician, trade unionist, and Bundist

- שמואל זיגלבוים
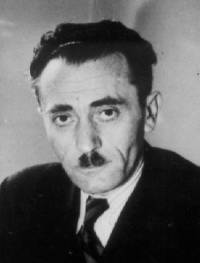

National Councillor
- In office March 1942 – 12 May 1943
- President: Władysław Raczkiewicz
- Prime Minister: Władysław Sikorski

Central Committee of the Bund
- In office 1924 – 12 May 1943

Judenrat of the Warsaw Ghetto
- In office September – November 1939
- President: Adam Czerniaków

Łódź city council
- In office 1938 – September 1939

Personal details
- Born: 21 February 1895 Borowica, Lublin Governorate, Congress Poland, Russian Empire
- Died: 12 May 1943 (aged 48) St Mary's Hospital, Paddington, England
- Cause of death: Suicide
- Resting place: New Mt. Carmel Cemetery, Ridgewood, New York
- Party: General Jewish Bund
- Occupation: Trade union activist, politician, journalist
- Known for: Publicizing the Holocaust in Poland

Szmul Mordko Zygielbojm (Polish: [ˈʂmul zɨˈɡʲɛlbɔjm]; Yiddish: שמואל זיגלבוים; 21 February 1895 – 12 May 1943) was a Polish socialist politician, Bund trade-union activist, and member of the National Council of the Polish government-in-exile.

Zygielbojm was born in 1895 into a working-class family and had to leave school at age ten. In his early twenties he became involved in Bund trade-union activism, and in 1924 was elected to the Bund Central Committee. He edited a Bund newspaper and in 1938 was elected to the Łódź city council. Upon Germany's invasion of Poland, he fled to Warsaw and was briefly a member of the Judenrat.

He fled to the Netherlands, then to England, where he was appointed to the National Council of the Polish government-in-exile. He interviewed Jan Karski and tried to publicize the mass murder of Jews in German-occupied Poland. After the Warsaw Ghetto Uprising was brutally crushed, and Warsaw's remaining Jews murdered by units under SS-Brigadeführer Jürgen Stroop, Zygielbojm committed suicide to protest the inaction of the western Allies.

== Early years ==
Szmul Zygielbojm was born on February 21, 1895, in the village of Borowica, Poland (then part of the Russian Empire). His family moved to Krasnystaw in 1899. Due to poverty, he left school and began working in a factory at the age of 10. Zygielbojm left home for Warsaw when he was 12, but he returned to Krasnystaw at the beginning of World War I and moved with his family to Chełm.

== Bundist career ==
In his 20s, Zygielbojm became involved in the Jewish labor movement, and in 1917 he represented Chełm at the first Bundist convention in Poland. Zygielbojm so impressed the Bund leadership at the convention that he was invited to Warsaw in 1920 to serve as secretary of the Trade Union of Jewish Metal Workers and a member of the Warsaw Committee of the Bund. In 1924 he was elected to the Bund's Central Committee, a position he held until his death.

By 1930, Zygielbojm was editing the Jewish labor unions' journal, Arbeiter Fragen ("Worker’s Issues"). In 1936, the Central Committee sent him to Łódź to lead the Jewish workers' movement, and in 1938 he was elected to its city council.

== Exile ==
After Germany invaded Poland in September 1939, Zygielbojm returned to Warsaw, where he participated in the defense committee during the siege and defense of the city. When the Nazis occupied Warsaw, they demanded 12 hostages from the population to prevent further resistance. Stefan Starzyński, the city's president, proposed that the Jewish labor movement provide a hostage, Ester Iwińska. Zygielbojm volunteered in her place.

On his release, Zygielbojm was made a member of the Jewish Council, or Judenrat, which the Nazis had appointed. The Nazis ordered the Judenrat to begin the creation of a ghetto within Warsaw. Because of Zygielbojm's public opposition to the order, his fellow Bundists feared for his safety and arranged for him to leave. In December 1939, Zygielbojm reached Belgium. Early in 1940, he spoke before a meeting of the Labour and Socialist International in Brussels and described the early stages of the Nazi persecution of Polish Jewry.

When the Nazis invaded Belgium in May 1940, Zygielbojm went to France and then the US, where he spent a year and a half trying to convince Americans of the dire situation facing Jews in Nazi-occupied Poland.

=== National Council ===
In March 1942, he arrived in London to join the National Council of the Polish government in exile, where he was one of two Jewish members (the other was Ignacy Schwarzbart). In London, Zygielbojm continued to speak publicly about the fate of Polish Jews, including a meeting of the British Labour Party and a speech broadcast on BBC Radio on June 2, 1942. On June 25, 1942, The Telegraph reported the existence of Nazi gas chambers and the mass killing of Jews, based on Szmul Zygielbojm's information.

His booklet, written in English in 1942 and titled "Stop Them Now. German Mass Murder of Jews in Poland", with a foreword by Lord Wedgwood, was his final attempt to make the world aware of the extermination of Jews in Europe.

I must mention here that the Polish population gives all possible help and sympathy to the Jews. The solidarity of the population in Poland has two aspects: first it is expressed in the common suffering and secondly in the continued joint struggle against the inhuman occupying Power. The fight with the oppressors goes on steadily, stubbornly, secretly, even in the ghetto, under conditions so terrible and inhuman that they are hard to describe or imagine.... The Polish and Jewish population keep in constant touch, exchanging newspapers, views and instructions. The walls of the ghetto have not really separated the Jewish population from the Poles. The Polish and the Jewish masses continue to fight together for common aims, just as they have fought for so many years in the past.

In the middle of 1942, Jan Karski, who had been serving as a courier between the Polish underground and the Polish government in exile, was smuggled into the Warsaw Ghetto. One of his guides in the ghetto was Leon Feiner who, like Zygielbojm, was a Bundist. Karski asked Feiner what prominent American and British Jews should do. "Tell the Jewish leaders," Feiner said, "that ... they must find the strength and courage to make sacrifices no other statesmen have ever had to make, sacrifices as painful as the fate of my dying people, and as unique."

In the months following his return from Warsaw, Karski reported to the Polish, British and American governments on the situation in Poland, especially the Warsaw Ghetto and the Bełżec death camp, which he had visited secretly. (It is now believed that Karski had seen the Izbica Lubelska transit ghetto where Jews were held until they could be sent to Bełżec.) Newspaper accounts based on Karski's reports were published by The New York Times on November 25 and November 26, and The Times of London on December 7.

In December, Karski described the conditions in the ghetto to Zygielbojm, passing along Feiner's message:

This is what they want from their leaders in the free countries of the world, this is what they told me to say: "Let them go to all the important English and American offices and agencies. Tell them not to leave until they obtain guarantees that a way has been decided upon to save the Jews. Let them accept no food or drink, let them die a slow death while the world is looking on. Let them die. This may shake the conscience of the world.

Two weeks later, Zygielbojm spoke again on BBC Radio concerning the fate of the Jews of Poland. "It will actually be a shame to go on living," he said, "if steps are not taken to halt the greatest crime in human history."

== Suicide ==
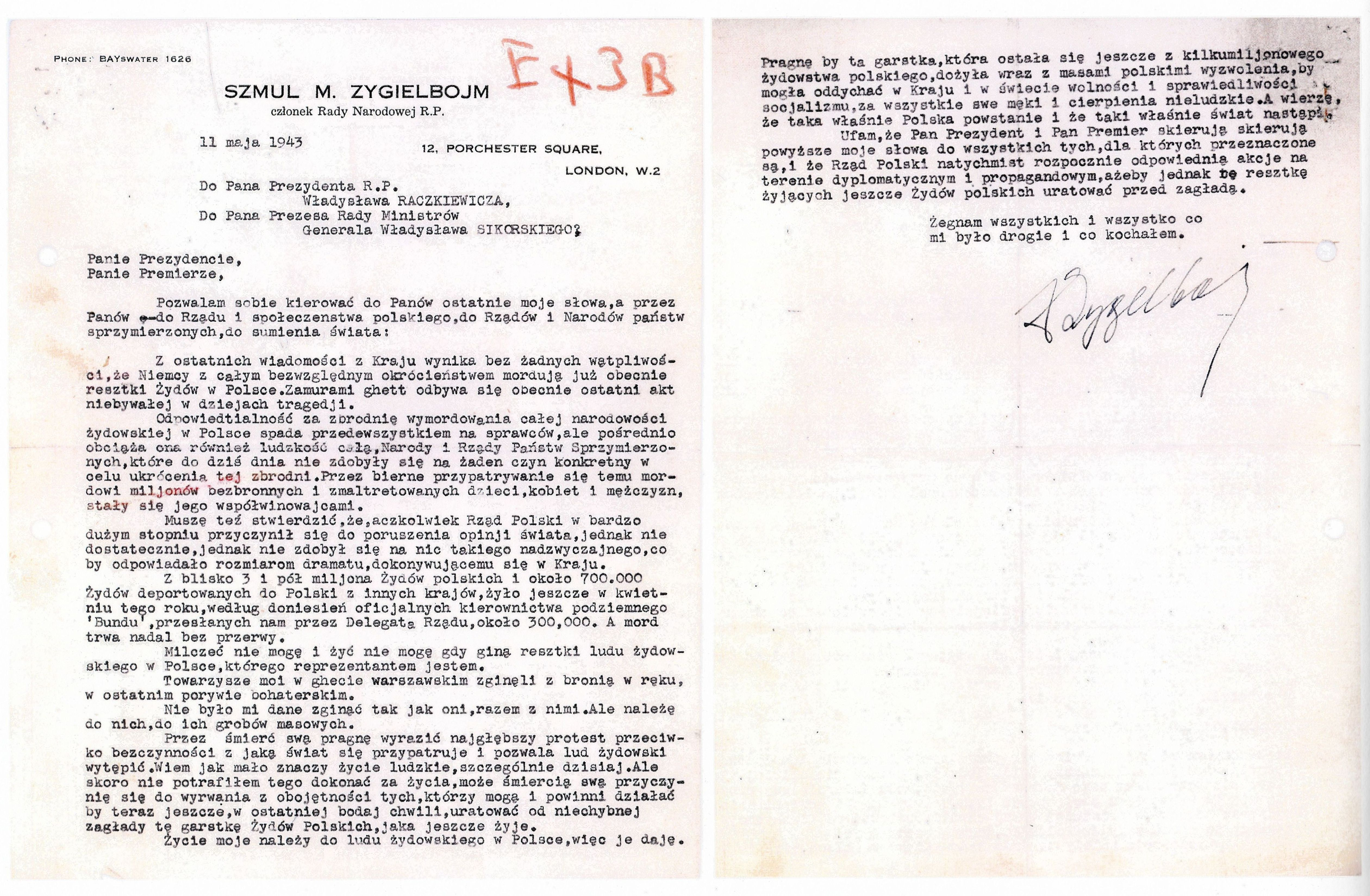
Zygielbojm's last letter, addressed to Polish president Władysław Raczkiewicz and prime minister Władysław Sikorski and dated 11 May 1943.

On 19 April 1943, high-ranking officials of the Allied governments of the UK and the US met in Bermuda, ostensibly to discuss the situation of the Jews in Nazi-occupied Europe. By coincidence, that same day the Nazis attempted to liquidate the remaining Jews in the Warsaw Ghetto and met with unexpected resistance.

By the beginning of May, the futility of the Bermuda Conference had become apparent. Days later, Zygielbojm received word of the suppression of the Warsaw Ghetto Uprising and of the ghetto's final liquidation. He learned that his wife Manya and 16-year-old son Tuvia had been killed there. At his home in west London, 12, Porchester Square, Paddington, on 11 May Zygielbojm committed suicide with an overdose of sodium amytal, as a protest against the indifference and inaction of the Allied governments in the face of the Holocaust. He died at St Mary's Hospital, Paddington, on 12 May 1943.

In a long suicide note addressed to Polish president Władysław Raczkiewicz and prime minister Władysław Sikorski, Zygielbojm said that while the Nazis were responsible for the murder of the Polish Jews, "the whole of humanity" was also indirectly culpable. He accused the Western Allies of "looking on passively upon this murder of defenseless millions of tortured children, women and men," and the Polish government of not doing enough.

I cannot continue to live and to be silent while the remnants of Polish Jewry, whose representative I am, are being murdered. My comrades in the Warsaw ghetto fell with arms in their hands in the last heroic battle. I was not permitted to fall like them, together with them, but I belong with them, to their mass grave. By my death, I wish to give expression to my most profound protest against the inaction in which the world watches and permits the destruction of the Jewish people.

He wished his letter to be widely publicized and hoped that "the Polish Government [would] embark immediately on diplomatic action... in order to save the living remnant of the Polish Jews from destruction."

After his death, Zygielbojm's seat in the Polish exile parliament was taken over by Emanuel Scherer. Zygielbojm's younger son, Joseph, survived the ghetto's destruction. After taking a leadership role in the Polish resistance during the war, he emigrated to the United States. He became a scientist at NASA. He died in 1995, survived by his sons, Arthur and Paul.

Zygielbojm did not leave a will, but administration of his estate, valued at £360.85 (equivalent to £14,226 in 2025), was granted to Lucjan Blit, a journalist.

== Memorials ==
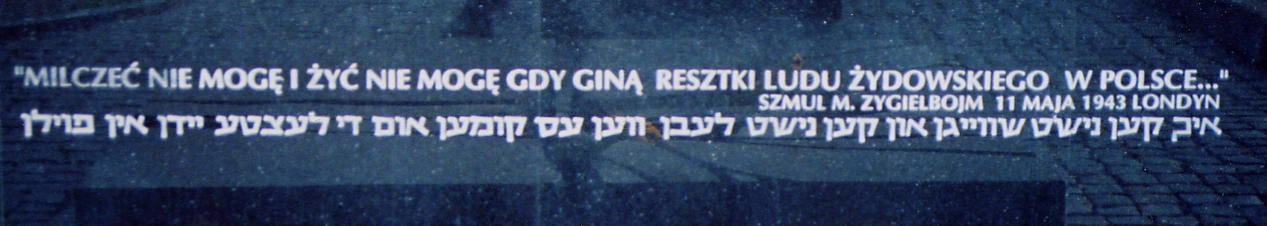
Warsaw memorial inscription

Zygielbojm's body was cremated in symbolic protest and unity with the murdered millions of the Holocaust. In 1959, his surviving son located the cremains in a shed in the Golders Green Jewish Cemetery in London. Because Zygielbojm had been cremated, the religious community would not permit his ashes to be buried in a Jewish cemetery. With the assistance of the American Jewish labor movement, Zygielbojm's cremains were brought to the US and interred at the New Mt. Carmel Cemetery in Ridgewood, New York, in 1961.

In May 1996, a plaque in memory of Zygielbojm was dedicated at the corner of Porchester Road and Porchester Square in London, near where he had committed suicide. The creation of the memorial was a joint project of the Bund and the Jewish Socialists' Group. The Polish ambassador and the mayor of Westminster were present.

A granite memorial to Zygielbojm was incorporated into a building at 5 S. Dubois Street in Muranów, a housing project built after World War II on the ruins of the Warsaw Ghetto.

In 2008 a plaque was added to the building in Chełm where Zygielbojm had lived. A Bundist commander of the Warsaw Ghetto Uprising, Marek Edelman, wrote a letter that was read at the plaque's dedication.

Zygielbojm is the subject of a 2001 Polish documentary, Śmierć Zygielbojma ("The Death of Zygielbojm"). The film, directed by Dżamila Ankiewicz, won a special mention at the Kraków Film Festival.

In 2021, he was the subject of a Polish drama film Śmierć Zygielbojma ("The Death of Zygielbojm"), which tells the story of an investigation by a British journalist into the life of Szmul Zygielbojm and his attempts to expose Nazi Germany's war crimes. It was directed by Ryszard Brylski and stars Wojciech Mecwaldowski in the title role.

== Literature ==
- Ankiewicz, Dzamila; Nowowiejski, Marek (2001). Zygielbojm's Death. New York: Filmakers Library.
- Ravel, Aviva (1980). Faithful unto Death: The Story of Arthur Zygielbaum. Montreal: Arthur Zygielbaum Branch, Workmen's Circle. ISBN 0969043503.
- Rowiński, Aleksander (2000). Zygielbojma śmierć i życie [Zygielbojm's Life and Death] (in Polish). Warsaw: Oficyna Literatów Rój. ISBN 9788385049463.
  - Rowiński, Aleksander (2004). Zygielbojms Reise. Eine Spurensuche [Zygielbojm's Journey: A Search for Clues] (in German). Translated by Karaś, Agnieszka. Osnabrück: fibre. ISBN 9783929759808.
- Zygielbojm, Szmul (1947). Hertz, J. S. (ed.). Zigelboym-bukh זיגלבוים-בוך [The Book of Zygielbojm's Writings] (in Yiddish). New York: Farlag Unzer Tsayt.

== See also ==
- List of Poles (Holocaust resistance)
- International response to the Holocaust
