= International Jewish Labor Bund =

Former Jewish socialist organization

The International Jewish Labor Bund (IJLB) was an international Jewish socialist organization, based on the legacy of the General Jewish Labour Bund which was founded in the Russian Empire in 1897, and the Polish Bund that was active in the interwar years. Bund organizations were originally created to defend Jewish national-cultural rights in Eastern Europe. The World Coordinating Committee of the IJLB was established in 1947 and it was composed of local Bundist groups around the world created for members to maintain their social life and movement after the Holocaust. It was an "associated organization" of the Socialist International, similar in status to the World Labour Zionist Movement or the International League of Religious Socialists. Bundist ideology stood against Jewish clericalism, assimilation, and Zionism, and contrasts Zionist beliefs regarding the Yiddish language and the immigration of Jews. In the mid-2000s, The World Coordinating Committee of the Jewish Labor Bund was dissolved in New York, although local Bundist groups or groups inspired by the Jewish Labor Bund continued in Mexico and Australia.

In late 2023, Jews began re-establishing the IJLB and since then chapters have sprung up in cities across America and Europe.

== History ==
Before World War Two, the Bund contributed heavily to the modernization of Jewish life as well as promoting the idea that Jews were not bound to a territory and instead were connected through history, language and culture. The Bund was the first Socialist Jewish Party and their goal was to improve political conditions in Russia, protect Jewish workers, to ensure their rights, and oppose religious persecution.

Right before World War Two, the Bund organized together to protest against growing anti-semitism. Members of the Bund created resistance groups and participated in strikes. During World War Two, the Bund participated in the Warsaw Ghetto Uprising and organized underground groups within concentration camps. Many members of the Bund were killed during the Holocaust and by the Soviet Army. Two influential Bundist figures, Henryk Ehrlich and Victor Alter were executed by the Soviet Army. Historians believe that the original Bund was lost to the effects of the Holocaust in Poland, the demise of the Jewish working class, and consequently the demise of the Yiddish infrastructure. However, the organization was slowly re-established by Bundists who escaped and survived World War Two as the International Jewish Labor Bund. The Bund was reconstituted with the principle that the Jewish problem could only be solved in places where Jews actively lived through democratic socialism.

As members of the Bund left Eastern Europe after the Holocaust, Bundism spread worldwide. After 1947, Bund organizations were developed in France, Belgium, Switzerland, Sweden, England, Tel-Aviv, Haifa, Batyam, Beersheba, Natanya, Tiberias, Ashkelon, Kfar Yavne, Ramat-Hasharon, Kiryat-gat, Ramla, Melbourne, Sydney, Johannesburg, Montreal, Toronto, Winnipeg, Mexico City, Argentina, Brazil, Uruguay, New York, Chicago, Los Angeles, Philadelphia, Miami, and Paterson. However, the International Jewish Labor Bund was not as successful at establishing itself in the United States as it was in Poland originally, due to the rise of McCarthyism which discouraged the establishment of leftist organizations. Jewish leftists remained active and organized in the U.S., but were not specifically Bundists. The World Coordinating Committee was established with the executives in New York City and the Secretariat in Paris. This committee perpetuated a worldwide victory for democracy and socialism wherever Jewish communities existed. The IJLB was admitted with an observer statute on the June 1947 Zürich Conference of the reconstituted Socialist International and as an "associated organization" at the Frankfurt founding Congress of the new Socialist International in 1951. In other parts of the world such as Melbourne, the Bund has a more active role within Jewish communities and continues to exist today.

In 1997 commemorative events were organized to celebrate the 100th anniversary of the Bund in New York City, London, Warsaw, Paris, and Brussels, where the chairwoman of the Belgian chapter, herself 100 years old, was present.

== Summary of ideology ==
In 1958, the Jewish Labor Bund released a pamphlet commemorating the organization's 60th birthday. In it, the Bund summed up its ideology in seven points.

1. Jews are dispersed throughout the World, and are a distinct nationality, though without a common state. They will remain in this situation in the foreseeable future. They cannot be remade into a one-state nation.
2. The State of Israel does not represent the entire Jewish People. It does not solve the Jewish problem. Even now, the population of Israel is less than 15 percent of the world's Jewry. Consequently, Israeli leaders are not in a position to assert Zionist claims of leadership over world Jewry, and their policies of Hebraization of Jewish life and of downgrading all Jewish communities outside of Israel (including those in democratic countries, such as the U.S.A) as places of exile are harmful and fallacious.
3. The key to the safety and the future of the Jews in Israel is peace with the Arabs. To achieve it, concessions on both sides are needed. Israel should recognize the moral right of the Arab refugees to repatriation and compensation. The Arab nations should recognize the existence of Israel. The United Nations should do their utmost to put an end to the Israeli-Arab conflict which invites Russian penetration into this turbulent region and is a menace to world peace.
4. The overwhelming majority of the Jewish people live outside of Israel; almost half of all Jews live in the United States. Jewish problems must be solved in the countries in which the Jews live.
5. Assimilation is an escape for individuals, not a solution for a whole people with a distinctive national culture and identity. Pluralism is the life-blood of real democracy, and this principle applies to national and cultural life within countries as well.
6. Jewish national problems arising within the countries where Jews reside can be solved on the basis of freedom and democracy – more securely, by democratic Socialism – which will guarantee Jews the rights of freedom and equality, including the right to a free, autonomous self-determination to maintain their own Jewish identity and national culture. Within the Jewish community the Bund strives for a secularized Jewish culture in the Yiddish language.
7. Two criteria of Jewish policies – one for Israel, another for the Diaspora – should not be followed. Wherever Jews live – whether as a national minority throughout the world or as a majority in Israel – Jewish policy, certainly Jewish Socialist policy, should be based on the same principles of freedom, democracy, international justice and brotherhood. Reconciliation of the claims of the Jewish people with the rights of other people is the essence of the Bund approach to Jewish problems, an approach which brings into harmony the Bund's Jewish national program with the spirit of democratic Socialist internationalism.

== Bundist vs. Zionist beliefs ==
After Israel was established in 1948, a Bund Conference was held where they rejected the creation and instead called for a Binational Jewish Arab state in Palestine. They criticized the Zionist attitude towards the Arabs of Palestine. Zionism discouraged the use of Yiddish in Palestine, and some Zionist ideological currents professed the "Negation of the Diaspora," claiming that Jewish existence was only possible in the land of Israel. Consequently, the use of Yiddish, the most prominent language of Jews outside of Palestine, was discouraged in the Yishuv. The Bundists, in comparison, felt differently about the Yiddish language. While they did not believe in a unified Jewish nation, they believed in an Eastern European unified union which was representative of all people who spoke Yiddish. A significant goal of the Bund was to preserve and protect the Yiddish language as a way of holding onto Jewish "national-cultural autonomy".

Bundists advocate for a concept of international justice that integrates Jewish claims with respect for the rights of other groups. The Bund emphasizes collaboration with non-Jewish communities, particularly those who are underprivileged or experiencing hardship. As a Socialist Jewish political organization, Bundists are committed to class struggle and national rights.

Termed by the Russian Jewish politician Vladimir Medem, the principle of "Neutralism" ensured the Bund's neutral stance in the fight between nationalism and assimilation. Bundists also believe in a concept called doikayt in Yiddish translating to here-ness in English. This Bundist principle relates to their beliefs in non-Zionism. It is the belief that national-cultural autonomy of different groups of minorities within states is composed of many different minority groups. Unlike Zionism, doikayt favors localism as opposed to globalism in unifying Jewish culture. Another Bundist principle, called Veltlekhkeit in Yiddish, loosely translates to secularism in English. It exists as a modern alternative to traditional religious obscurantism of communities in the Russian Empire and Poland before World War Two. Veltlekheit sees religion as an individual and private matter but does not exist to promote anti-religion ideologies. Following the Veltlekhkeit principles, the Bund envisioned an uprising and revolution of the oppressed against the oppressors. They aimed at liberating all victims of capitalism, regardless of country, nation or race. The Bund placed their faith in a socialist revolution where the goal was to liberate all of humankind from political, economical and national oppression including anti-semitism.

== The Bund in the United States ==
The Bund Organization of New York was founded in November 1946, through the merging of the Medem Club and the American Representation of the Bund in Poland, and with the goal of unifying the Jewish Labor Bund globally, as well as spreading Yiddish culture and socialist politics among American Jewry. Before and after WWII, New York City had become America's epicenter of Yiddish life due to the immigration of Polish Jews, who made housing cooperatives, radio stations, and newspapers. Despite the organization being relatively small, compared to other socialist movements of the time, such as the Workmen's Circle, it had multiple branches across North America, in cities such as Los Angeles, Chicago, Detroit, Miami, Toronto, and Montreal. The New York branch was the central voice of the American Bund Organizations, and held several conferences. Furthermore, it hosted Jewish Holiday celebrations and Holocaust commemorations, had a Bundist summer camp called Hemshekh (Continuity), and wrote on various Yiddish newspapers and publications, such as Unzer Tsayt. Prominent voices and leaders included Emanuel Nowogrodski and Emanual Scherer. The Bund Organization of New York was involved with US politics both locally and nationally, with movements such as the Civil rights movements, Vietnam anti-war protests, and protests against rising Neo-Nazism and antisemitism.

The Jewish American Bund was a socialist party, concerned with uniting other American labor parties and the Jewish Left. The organization saw the US Democratic Party as pro-capitalist, and often chose to support independent, socialist candidates that supported workers in local and national elections. In the case there was no candidate that represented the views of the party, members were encouraged to vote freely or not vote at all, which occurred in the 1965 New York Mayoral election and the 1960 national election respectively. A break in this tendency occurred in 1963, after the assassination of JFK., in which the Bund endorsed former presidential candidate Lyndon Johnson. The organization also attempted to merge with other similarly aligned socialist groups in the US, such as the equally sized and aligned Jewish Socialist Verbrand. In response to the Civil rights movement, the Bund wrote a 1965 resolution in solidarity with the Black Civil rights movement, expressing that Jewish socialists were committed to the freedom and equality of all peoples.

The American Jewish Bund was in slow decline ever since its establishment due to the political and cultural environment of the US and the world. The young Jewish communities in the US didn't have the same catalyzing conditions as the working class communities of the Polish Bund before WWII did, but were rather more likely to assimilate and adopt capitalism. Especially after the establishment of a Jewish state in Israel in 1948, many Jews and Jewish labor parties, such as the Workmen's Circle, supported Zionism, and whereas the Bund was staunchly against the formation of a Jewish state, but rather believed in the creation of autonomous zones. The movement of socialism in the US failed to gain traction, especially during the cold war, in which Communism and other Leftist forms of government were persecuted by the McCarthyist government. The American chapter of the Jewish Labor Bund was principally a political organization, focused on sharing the ideals of Bundism and socialism, but did so on a scale larger than its support base, and failed to adapt to the cultural and political environment.

== Leadership ==
Presidents

- Motl Zelmanowicz (US branch)
- Binyomin Tabachinski (US branch)
- Nachman Gryfenberg (Australia branch)
- Binem Warshawski (Australia branch)
- Jacob Waks (1940-1948, Australia branch)
- Yisachar Artuski (Israel branch)

General secretaries

- Henryk Erlich (1897–1917, Russia branch; 1917–1945, Poland branch)
- Emanuel Nowogrodzki (1917–1939, Poland branch; 1947–1961, US branch)
- Emanuel Scherer (1961–1977, US branch)
- Benjamin Nadel (1992–2004, US branch)

== Executives of the World Coordinating Committee ==
Executive of the World Coordinating Committee in 1957: David Meier, Abraham Stolar, Emanuel Sherer, Emmanuel Novogrodski, Benjamin Tabatchinski, Pinchas Schwartz, Leon Oler, Alexander Erlich, J.S. Hertz, Joseph Gutgold, Hershel Himelfarb, Baruch Shefner

Members of the World Coordinating Committee 1957:

Peretz Guterman, F. Shrager, Leon Stern (all three from France), Meyer Treibeer, Berl Fuchs (both from Brazil), Berl Rosner (England), Tschechanowski (Belgium), Shimon Yezher, Tuvie Meisel (both from Mexico), Kowalsman (Uruguay), Alexander Mints, Dr. M. Peretz (both from Argentina), S. M. Oshry, M. L. Polin, Ch. S. Kasdan, Motl Zelmanowicz (all from US), Artur Lermer, Manie Reinhartz (both from Canada), Paul Olberg (Sweden), Bunem Wiener, Mendel Kosher, Jacob Waks (all three from Australia), Bentzl Zalwitz, Pesach Burshin, Israel Artuski (all three from Israel)

== Bund Congresses ==
1. 1947 (April) Brussels
2. 1948 (October 1–8) New York
3. 1955 (April 8–15) Montreal
  1. This was the third Bund World Conference and it had a more positive outlook on Israel than Bundist groups in the past. They acknowledged the development of an Active Bund Organization inside Israel. At this meeting they acknowledged the existence of Israel while continuing to reject the Zionist identification of Israel as the homeland for all Jews and the international center of Jewish life.
4. 1965 (April 19–25) New York
5. 1972 New York
6. 1985 New York

== Affiliated groups ==
Bund groups continue to meet in the United Kingdom (Jewish Socialists' Group), France (Centre Medem – Arbeiter Ring and Club laïque de l'enfance juive (CLEJ)), Denmark, Canada, US, Australia (Jewish Labour Bund and S.K.I.F.), Argentina (General Jewish Labour Bund), and Uruguay. The Israeli branch (Arbeter-ring in Yisroel – Brith Haavoda) ceased operating in 2019. Since 2023, an international effort has been made to re-establish the IJLB and chapters have sprung up in many cities across America and Europe.

From 1959–1978 the Bund operated a summer youth camp called Camp Hemshekh in the Catskills region of New York State. The surviving youth movement of the Bund, S.K.I.F., also ran summer camps in Canada and in Melbourne, Australia. Today, S.K.I.F. operates in Melbourne, Australia, and in France since 1963 as the Club laïque de l'enfance juive: Secular Club of Jewish Children).

== Press ==
Several publishing houses associated with the International Jewish Labor Bund have been established globally, collectively producing 50 volumes printed in Yiddish. In New York, the IJLB issued a monthly Yiddish journal called Undzer Tzayt, alongside the Jewish Labor Bund Bulletin and the Bulletin of the Jewish Youth Movement. Additionally, Shloyme Mendelson Farlag operated in Mexico City, while Idbuch was based in Buenos Aires. Numerous smaller volumes were also published in various locations worldwide under the auspices of the Bund.

In 1957, for the sixtieth years of existence of the Bund, the IJLB published a commemorative book in Yiddish and English with photographs, Der Bund In Bilder, 1897–1957.

A year later, in 1958, the Parisian sector of the Bund published a brochure, Bundishe fraye tribune, which attacked members and ideologies from the World Coordinating Committee. The most notable argument was by Ralphal Ryba, who claimed that World Coordinating Committee was empty rhetoric and never followed through on its commitments to its people and local Bundist organizations. He also came after Bundist printing groups in New York for overprinting Bundist history books instead of printing political leaflets.

Unser Shtine: a Yiddish daily based out of Paris and circulated in all European Jewish Communities

Foroys: A bi-weekly paper based out of Mexico

Unser Gedank: A bi-weekly publication based in Buenos Aires, Argentina

Unser Gedank: A monthly paper based in Melbourne, Australia, created by Jacob Waks

Lebnsfragen: A monthly paper based in Tel-Aviv and published in Yiddish

Unser Stimme: A daily paper based in Paris, France

Di Yungt Shtime: A bilingual journal published by the Jewish Students' Bund in New York during the mid to late 1970s. One of its notable publications was a collection of Bundist songs titled "Yiddish Songs of Work and Struggle," released in 1972.
