= Motl =

Motl is a surname and given name, with the latter being of Jewish origin. Notable people with the name include:

== Surname ==
- Bob Motl (1920–2007), American football end
- Luboš Motl (born 1973), Czech theoretical physicist
- Pavel Motl (born 1997), Czech tennis player

== Given name ==
- Motl Zelmanowicz (c. 1914–2010), Bundist activist
- Motl, Peysi the Cantor's Son, main character of novel by the Yiddish author Sholem Aleichem
