= Piotrkower Weker =

Yiddish-language newspaper from Poland

- Type: weekly newspaper
- Political alignment: General Jewish Labour Bund
- Language: Yiddish
- Headquarters: Piotrków Trybunalski
- Country: interbellum Poland

Piotrkower Weker (Yiddish: פּיאָטרקאָווער וועקער, lit. 'Piotrków Waker') was a Yiddish-language weekly newspaper in interbellum Poland, published from Piotrków Trybunalski. Piotrkower Weker was an organ of the General Jewish Labour Bund in Poland.
