= Emanuel Scherer =

Polish Jewish politician

Emanuel Scherer (1901 – 5 May 1977) was a Polish-American politician.

== Life ==
Emanuel Scherer graduated from the Jagiellonian University in Kraków, and became active in the Bund youth movement there. Later he moved to Warsaw, where he continued to be an active politician in the Bund party, in 1935 joining its Central Committee. In 1938 he was elected to the Warsaw City Council.

During World War II Scherer was able to escape to the West, where he took part in the work of the Polish government in exile. He was a member of the National Council of Poland and acted as the Bund's representative following Szmul Zygielbojm's death.

After the war, he emigrated to the United States, where he was a secretary in the International Jewish Labor Bund.

Scherer died in 1977.
