= Michal Shuldenfrei =

Polish Bundist politician

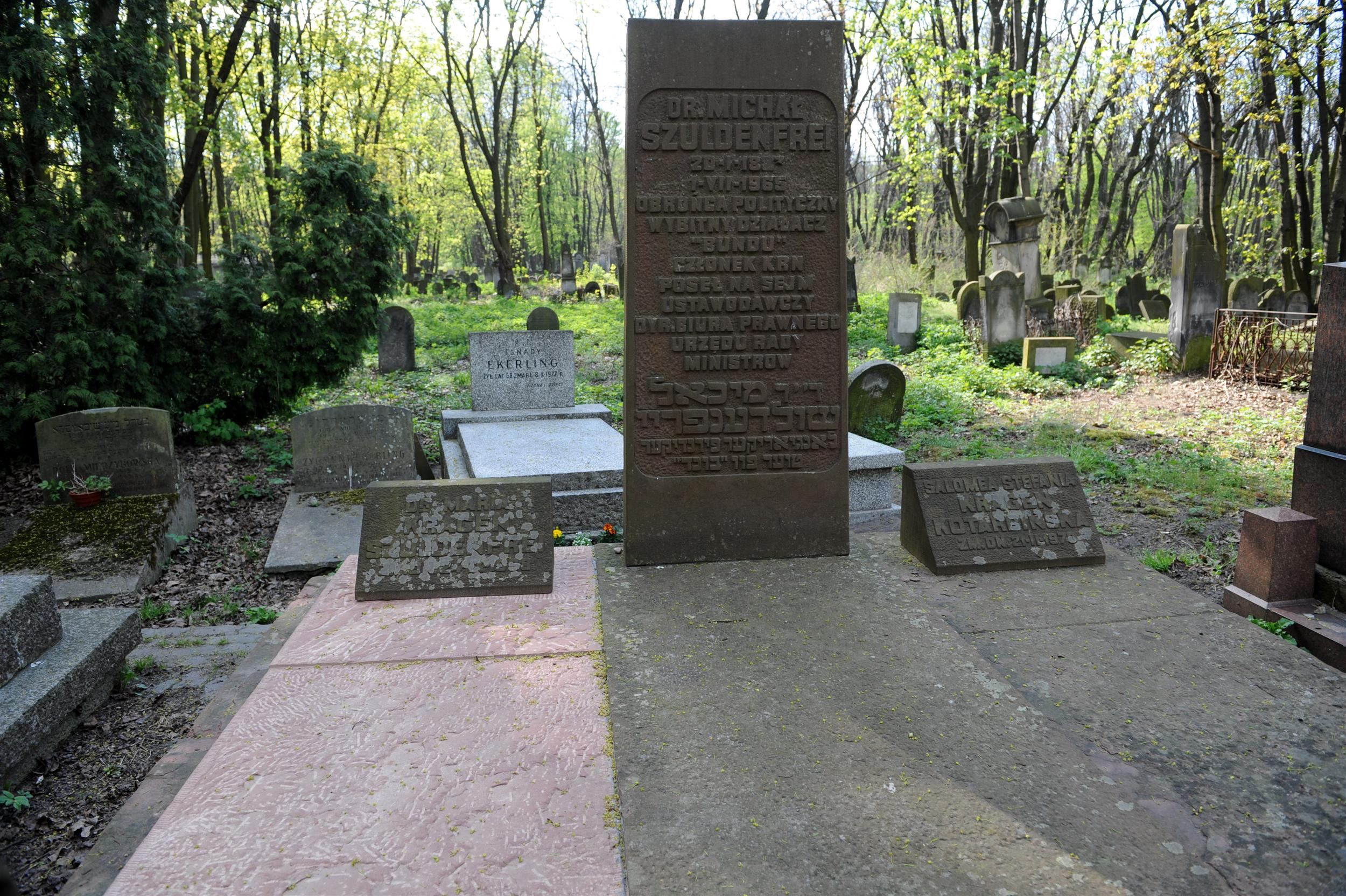
Shuldenfrei's grave at the Jewish Cemetery in Warsaw

Michal Shuldenfrei (or Michał Szuldenfrei) (January 20, 1887 in Częstochowa – July 1, 1965) was a Polish Jewish politician, lawyer, a delegate to the first Sejm of post World War II Poland.

He was elected as the only member of the Jewish Bund to the 1947 Polish parliament (as part of the electoral list of the still independent Polish Socialist Party, which was soon forced to merge into the Communist Polish United Workers' Party).

== Early life ==
Shuldenfrei was born on 20 January 1887 in Częstochowa. After he completed schooling in Kraków, he attended Jagiellonian University, and graduated from the Faculty of Law there in 1910 and received his Doctor of Law a year later. He worked as a judicial apprentice in Kraków between 1911 and 1917. In the interwar period in Poland he served as a defense lawyer in several politically charged trials.

== Political career ==
He was also very active in the Bund. During the last stages of the German occupation of Poland he joined the Soviet sponsored State National Council. In 1944, after the entry of the Soviet Army into Poland, and the establishment of the Lublin Committee he tried to reorganize the Bund, despite the fact that its pre war leaders, like Victor Alter and Henryk Ehrlich had been executed on Stalin's orders. He was one of the signatories of PKWN's July Manifesto.

After the war he was known for his dedication to the pursuit of German Nazi war criminals responsible for the Holocaust. He was also very active in trying to bring the perpetrators of the Kraków pogrom to justice.

He is buried at the Okopowa Street Jewish Cemetery in Warsaw.
