= Nowe Życie =

Nowe Życie (Polish for New Life) was a Polish-language fortnightly newspaper published in Warsaw, Poland. Nowe Życie was an organ of the General Jewish Labour Bund in Poland.
