= Arbeiter Fragen =

The Jewish Bundist (socialist) labour unions active in Poland in the 1920s and 1930s published a monthly publication called Arbeiter Fragen (Worker's Issues; initially published under the title of Najste Arbeiter-Fragen - New Worker's Issues). Although most of the articles were in Yiddish, some were also printed in Polish and Latinized Yiddish. Its chief editor from 1930 to 1936 was Szmul Zygielbojm.
