= Unser Stimme =

Yiddish newspaper in France

Unsere Schtimme ('Our Voice') was a Bundist daily Yiddish-language newspaper published from Paris. In the early 1960s, it had a circulation of around 3,000. Editors included Jacob Gros, Leon Stern and Abraham Shulman. The School of Paris painter Borvine Frenkel contributed to the paper.
