= Unser Gedank =

Bundist Yiddish newspaper in Argentina

Unser Gedank was a Bundist Yiddish-language newspaper published fortnightly from Buenos Aires. At its height in the early 1960s, it had a circulation of around 2,000. Editors included Alexander Minc, M. Bernstein and M. Perec.
