= Ignacy Schwarzbart =

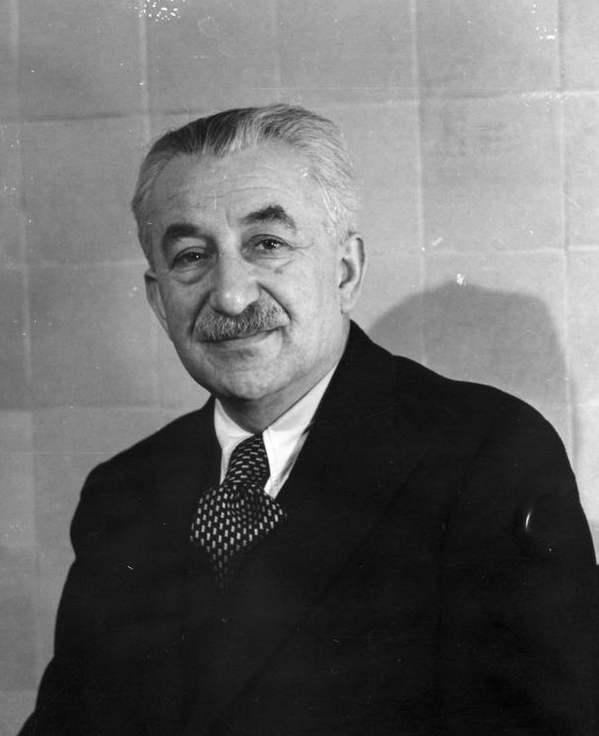
Ignacy Schwarzbart

Ignacy Izaak Schwarzbart (13 November 1888 in Chrzanów – 26 April 1961 in New York City) was a prominent Polish Zionist, and one of Jewish representatives on the Polish National Council of the Polish Government-in-Exile during the Second World War, along with Szmul Zygielbojm.

Schwarzbart and Zygielbojm played key roles in highlighting reports of Nazi atrocities against Jews in occupied Poland. In 1942 Schwarzbart held a press conference in London alleging that one million Jewish people had already been killed. The figures were reported in the media but were treated sceptically by both the British and by some other Polish politicians.

== Books ==
- Felicjan Sławoj Składkowski, Nie ostatnie słowo oskarżonego, Warszawa 2003, ISBN 83-88736-32-9
- Dariusz Stola, Nadzieja i Zagłada. Ignacy Schwarzbart - żydowski przedstawiciel w Radzie Narodowej RP (1940-1945), Warszawa 1995
- E. Thomas Wood and Stanisław M. Jankowski: Karski: How One Man Tried to Stop the Holocaust, by (John Wiley & Sons, Inc., 1994; paperback February 1996).
