= Foroys =

Discontinued bi-weekly Yiddish newspaper

- Political alignment: Bundist
- Language: Yiddish
- Country: Mexico

Foroys (Yiddish: פאָרויס, 'Forward') was a Bundist fortnightly Yiddish-language newspaper published from Mexico City. In the early 1960s, it had a circulation of around 2,000. Editors included I. Rotenberg, S. Jezior and S. Tsfas. Foroys was the organ of the Gezelshaft far kultur un hilf ('Association for Culture and Assistance').
