= Głos Bundu (1946) =

The cover of the sixth issue of Głos Bundu, published in 1947

Głos Bundu (Polish language for 'Voice of the Bund') was a Polish-language monthly publication issued from Warsaw, Poland between August 1946 and May 1948. Głos Bundu was an organ of the Central Committee of the General Jewish Labour Bund in Poland. In total seventeen issues of Głos Bundu were published.

The editorial office of Głos Bundu was located at ul. Targowa 44/8. It was printed at the "Automa" printing house at ul. Wilénska 7. The format of Głos Bundu was at times 31x47 centimeters, at times 43x30 centimeters, and contained between 8 and 16 pages per issue. Copies of the journal were sold for 5 złoty each.

Głos Bundu was closed down following the merger of the Polish Socialist Party (PPS) with the Polish Workers' Party (PPR). The last issue of the journal was issued on May 1, 1948.

The Bund had published other newspapers with the same name in earlier periods.
