= Motl Zelmanowicz =

Polish Bundist

Chaim Motl Zelmanowicz (c. 1914 – 16 October 2010) was a Bundist activist.

Zelmanowicz was born in Łódź, Poland. His father, Ephraim, was an activist in the General Jewish Labour Bund. At a very early age, he became an activist in the Bund in Poland, becoming the local chairman of S.K.I.F. (Sotsyalistishe Kinder Farband). In 1940, he moved to Seattle to escape from the Holocaust. He arrived with his brother, Shloyme, his future wife, Dr. Naomi Pat (known as Emma), and various friends and colleagues from the Bund. After moving to New York, he was instrumental in establishing the World Coordinating Committee of the Bund and was its chairman for many years.

Zelmanowicz was on the board of directors and a Trustee for YIVO, a member of the Board of Advisors of the Folksbiene, a vice-president of the Jewish Daily Forward, one of the Vice-Chairs of the Democratic Socialists of America, member of the executive committee of the Jewish Labor Committee, and President of the International Jewish Labor Bund.

He was the author of A Bundist Comments on History As It Was Being Made: The Post–Cold War Era (2009), a collection of articles originally published in the Bundist magazine Unzer Tsayt, for which he was a major contributor; and was responsible for the production of a recording of workers' songs, "In Love and Struggle" (1999), on CD. He also assisted scholar Jack Lester Jacobs, the author of Bundist Counterculture in Interwar Poland, in his research.
