= Boris Borvine Frenkel =

Polish Jewish French, School of Paris painter (1895–1984)

- Born: September 24, 1895; Kalisz, Poland
- Died: April 30, 1984 (aged 88); Saint-Sébastien-de-Morsent, Évreux, France
- Known for: Painting
- Movement: School of Paris

Boris Borvine Frenkel, born in Kalisz, Poland, on September 24, 1895, and died in Saint-Sébastien-de-Morsent near Évreux on April 30, 1984, was a Polish Jewish painter of the School of Paris.

== Biography ==
Boris Borvine Frenkel grew up in Poland in a peasant family and received a traditional Jewish education. After attending the high school in Kalisz, he apprenticed as an engraver during the First World War. In 1919, he moved to Lvov, where he attended architecture classes.

In 1920, after a brief stint in Warsaw prison for his anarchist activities, he traveled to Berlin in the early 1920s. Employed as a sailor on a cargo ship, he traveled the world. These years proved to be decisive; he established connections with Jewish intellectual and literary circles, meeting figures such as Else Lasker-Schüler, Peretz Markish, and Hayim Nahman Bialik.

After a brief stay in Paris, in Brussels from 1924 to 1930, Borvine Frenkel dedicated his free time to painting, completing his studies at the Institute of Decorative Arts. In 1930, the Museum of Fine Arts in Brussels held an exhibition dedicated to his work.

That same year, he was expelled from Belgium, settling in Paris, where he only left in order to avoid the German persecution under the occupation. He maintained contact with the group of Jewish painters from Eastern Europe associated with the École de Paris, and later joined the Association of Jewish Painters and Sculptors established in 1937. While exhibiting his paintings, he also made a living from various odd jobs. As an art and literature critic, he contributed to the Yiddish-language magazine "Unzer Stimme" and participated in the establishment of the magazine "Nos artistes" in 1960.

== See also ==
- School of Paris
- Hayim Nahman Bialik
- Yitzhak Frenkel
- Chaim Soutine
- Amedeo Modigliani
- Unzer Stimme
