= Borowica, Lublin Voivodeship =

Borowica
- Village
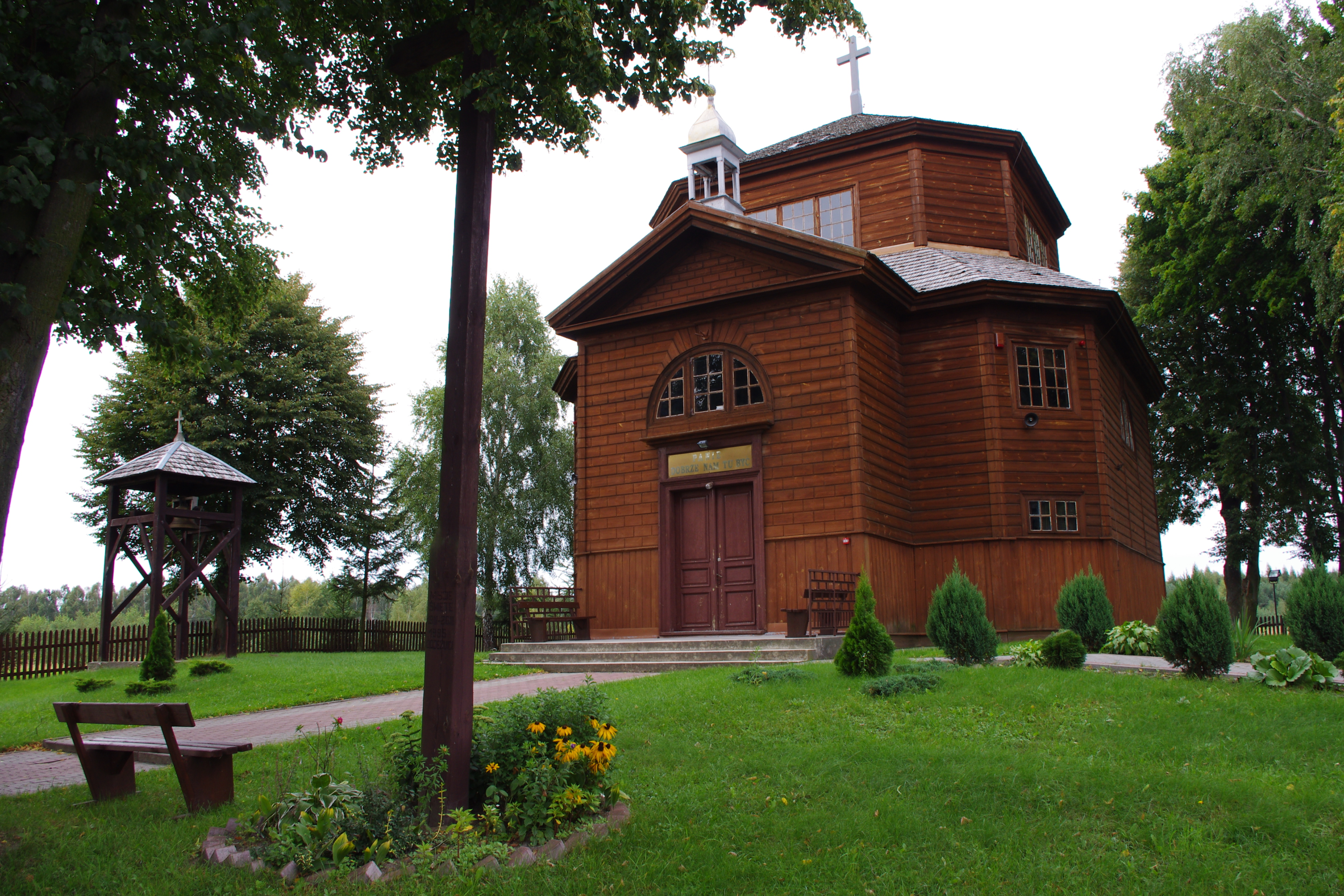
- Church of the Transfiguration of Christ

- Location within Poland
- Coordinates: 51°3′53″N 23°8′8″E
- Country: Poland
- Voivodeship: Lublin
- County: Krasnystaw
- Gmina: Łopiennik Górny
- Time zone: UTC+1 (CET)
  - Summer (DST): UTC+2 (CEST)

Borowica [bɔrɔˈvit͡sa] is a village in the administrative district of Gmina Łopiennik Górny, within Krasnystaw County, Lublin Voivodeship, in eastern Poland.

== History ==
Six Polish citizens were murdered by Nazi Germany in the village during World War II.
