= General Jewish Labour Bund in Poland =

1917–1948 political party in Poland

General Jewish Labour Bund in Poland אַלגעמײַנער ײדישער אַרבעטער בּונד אין פוילן
- Bund symbol in 1947, featuring the socialist "Three Arrows"
- Founded: December 1917
- Dissolved: 1948
- Split from: Jewish Labour Bund
- Ideology: Bundism; Socialism; Jewish Autonomism; Anti-Zionism
- Political position: Left-wing
- International affiliation: Labour and Socialist International

The General Jewish Labour Bund in Poland (Yiddish: אַלגעמײַנער ײדישער אַרבעטער בּונד אין פוילן, romanized: Algemayner Yidisher Arbeter-bund in Poyln, Polish: Ogólno-Żydowski Związek Robotniczy "Bund" w Polsce) was a Jewish socialist party in Poland which promoted the political, cultural and social autonomy of Jewish workers, sought to combat antisemitism and was generally opposed to Zionism.

== Creation of the Polish Bund ==
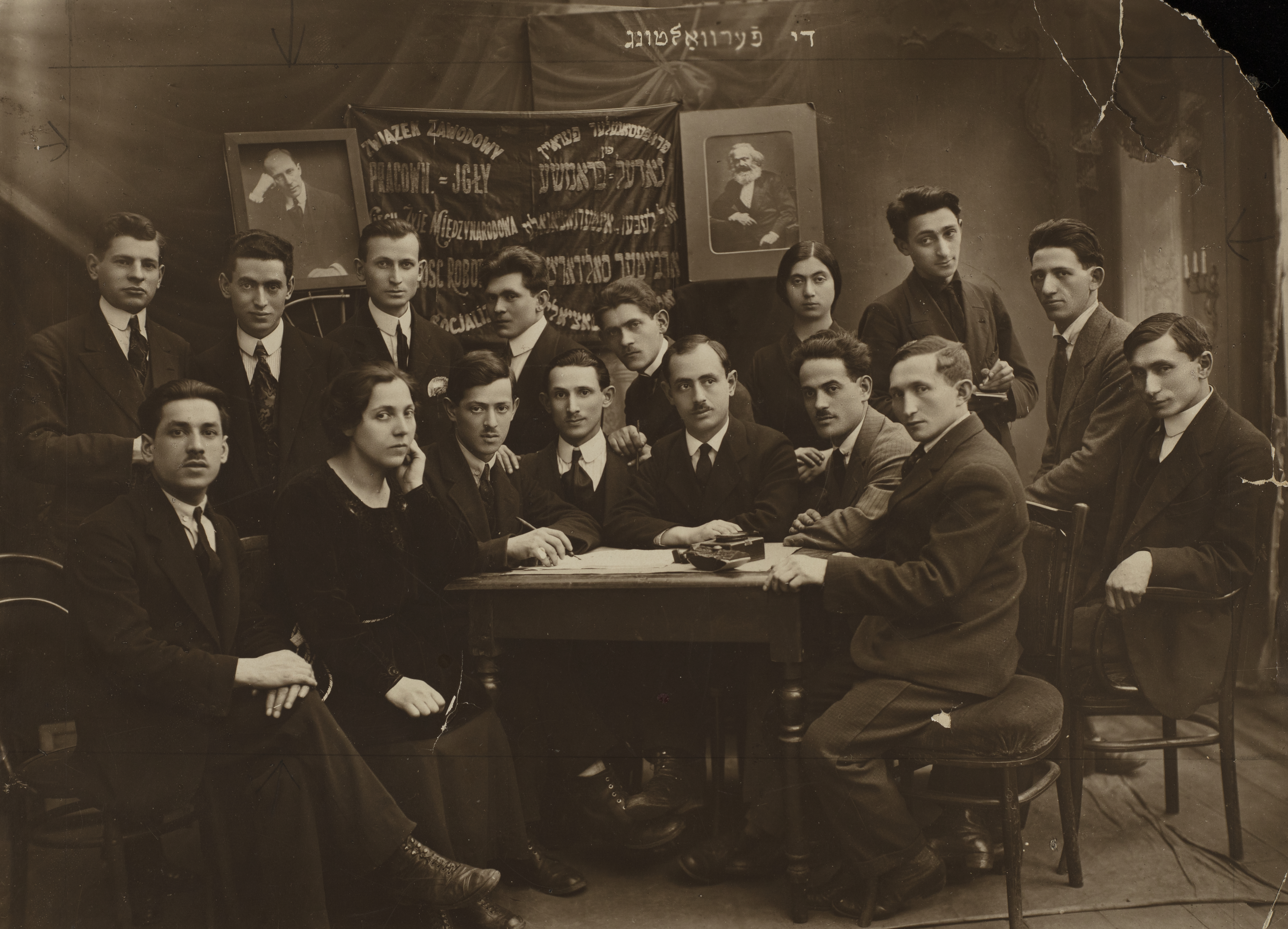
Executive Committee of the Warsaw Garment Workers' Union, 1917

The Polish Bund emerged from the General Jewish Labour Bund in Lithuania, Poland and Russia of the erstwhile Russian empire. The Bund had party structures established amongst the Jewish communities in the Polish areas of the Russian empire. When Poland fell under German occupation in 1914, contact between the Bundists in Poland and the party centre in St. Petersburg became difficult. In November 1914 the Bund Central Committee appointed a separate Committee of Bund Organizations in Poland to run the party in Poland. Theoretically the Bundists in Poland and Russia were members of the same party, but in practice the Polish Bundists operated as a party of their own. In December 1917 the split was formalized, as the Polish Bundists held a clandestine meeting in Lublin and reconstituted themselves as a separate political party.

== Communist split ==
In April 1920, the first convention of the Polish Bund was held, during which the merger of the Galician Jewish Social Democratic Party into the Bund was materialized. At the conference, a dispute over whether the party should join the Communist International erupted. A majority resolution calling for the entry of the party into the Communist International was passed at the convention, but never implemented. As a result, the Polish Bund was divided, with around a quarter of the Polish Bund leaving the party to form the Communist Bund in 1922 (which subsequently merged into the Communist Party in 1923).

== Organizing workers ==
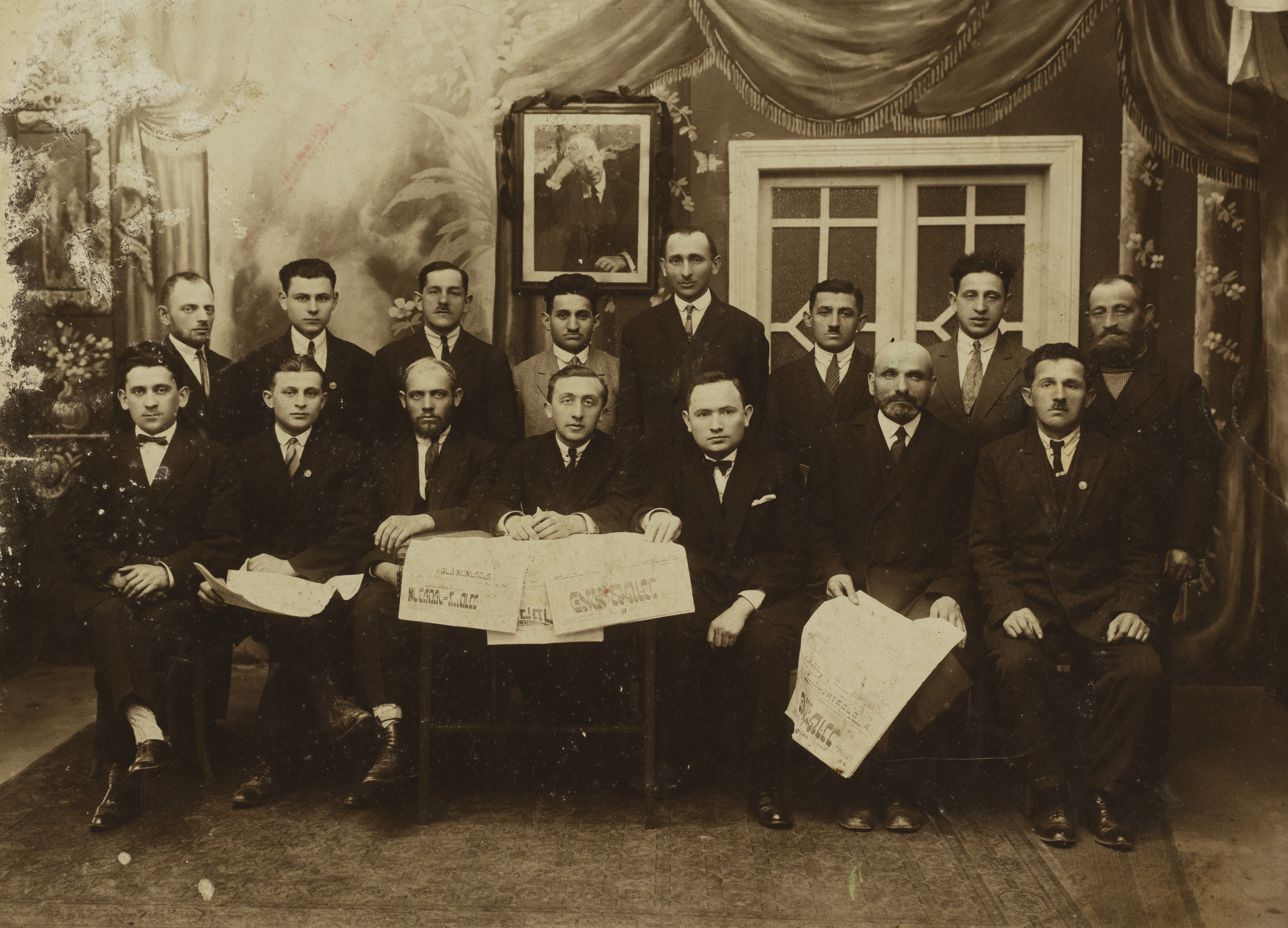
Executive Committee of the Polish Bakers' Union in Częstochowa, 1927

In 1921, Bund-affiliated trade unions joined the Central Commission of Class Trade Unions (Polish: Komisja Centralna Zwiazków Zawodowych—KCZZ), the governing council of the Union of Professional Associations (Polish: Związek Stowarzyszeń Zawodowych—ZSZ), the umbrella organization of the Polish Socialist Party trade unions. However, while part of the KCZZ, the Bund unions were not part of the ZSZ.

== Merger with Wilno groups ==
The Bund branch in Wilno (now Vilnius) was divided along the same lines as the rest of the Russian Bund in 1920, with a left-wing majority group and a right-wing minority group. The latter was associated with the Russian Social Democratic Bund. Both groups were reluctant to join the Polish Bund, even after it had become apparent that Wilno was an integrated part of the Polish state. The Wilno Social Democratic Bund distrusted the Polish Bund for its overtures to the Comintern, stating that the Polish Bund had ceased to be a Social Democratic organization.

In 1923 both Wilno Bund factions merged into the Polish Bund as a united local party organization.

== Electoral participation ==
Contrary to the other Jewish parties, the Bund advocated an electoral cooperation with other Socialists, and not just between either Jewish parties or with other minority parties (in the electoral alliance "Bloc of National Minorities"). Thence, Agudat Israel, Folkspartei and the various Zionist parties were represented in the Sejm, but the Bund never was. According to Bernard Johnpoll, this was mostly because its potential partner, the Polish Socialist Party (PPS), was reluctant to appear as a pro-Jewish party.

The party obtained 81,884 votes (0.9%) at the 1922 Sejm election, approximately 100,000 (0.7%) in the 1928 Sejm election and 66,699 at the largely rigged 1930 Sejm election.

In the autumn of 1933, the party issued a call to the Polish public to boycott goods from Germany, in protest of the Hitler regime.

In December 1938 and January 1939, at the last Polish municipal elections before the start of the Second World War, the Bund received the largest segment of the Jewish vote. In 89 towns, one-third elected Bund majorities. In Warsaw, the Bund won 61.7% of the votes cast for Jewish parties, taking 17 of the 20 municipal council seats won by Jewish parties. In Łódź, the Bund won 57.4% (11 of 17 seats won by Jewish parties). For the first time, the Bund and the PPS had agreed to call their electors to vote for each other where only one of them presented a list. This however did not go so far as common electoral lists. This alliance made it possible for a Left electoral victory in most great cities: Warsaw, Łódź, Lwów, Piotrkow, Kraków, Białystok, Grodno, Wilno.

After its municipal electoral successes in December 1938 and January 1939, the Bund hoped for a breakthrough at the parliamentary elections due in September 1939, but these were de facto cancelled by the German-Soviet invasion.

== Organization ==
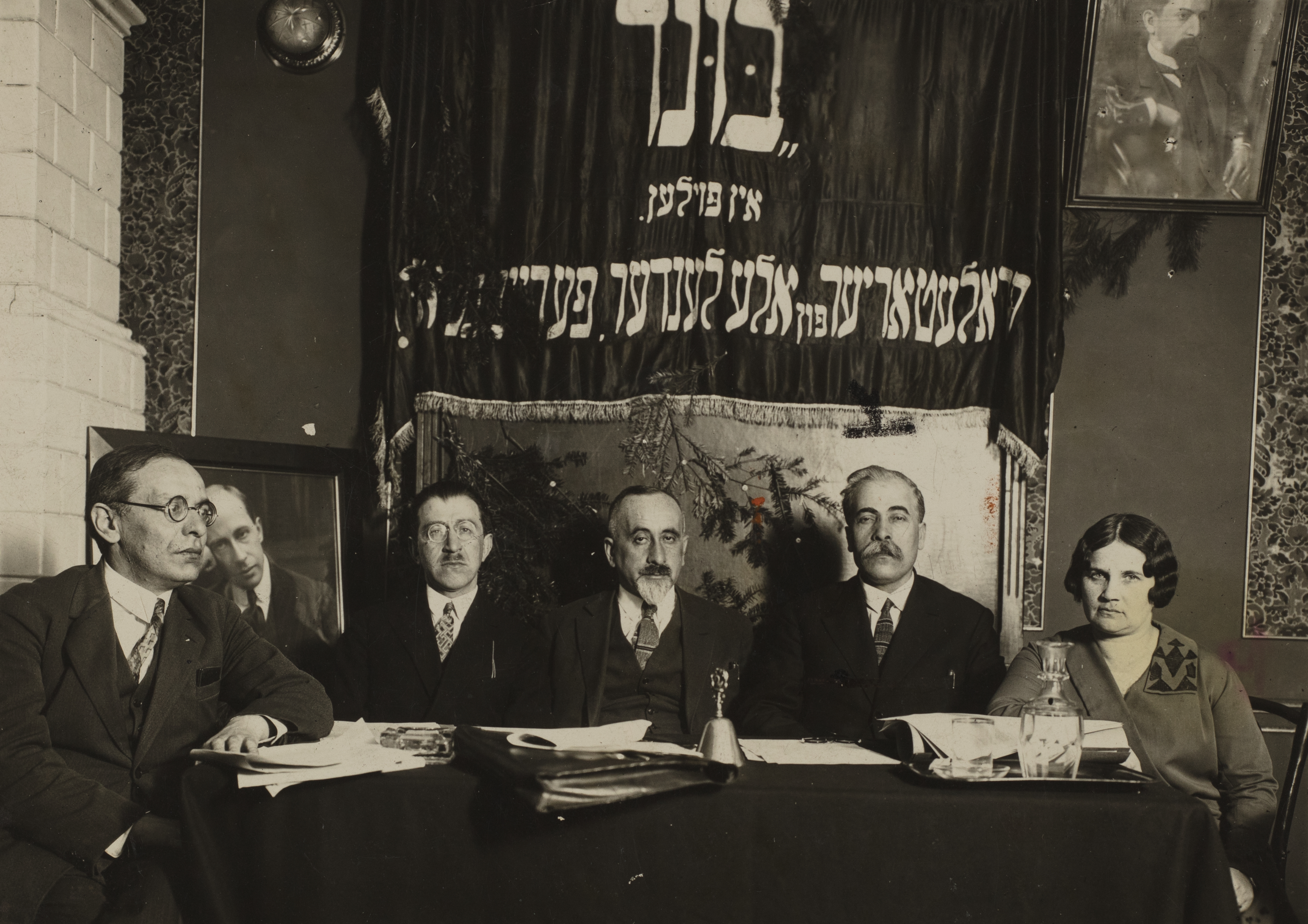
The Presidium of the Polish Bund in Warsaw, 1928. From left to right: Israel Lichtenstein, Yitzhak Rafes, Henryk Ehrlich, Ikutiel Portnoy, and Bella Shapiro.

The party organization was based on local and regional groups, which formed the lowest level of party cells. Each group had its local party committee. The highest authority of the Bund resided with the Party Congress, which elected the Central Committee and the Party Council, an advisory group. The Central Committee was composed of delegates designated by the larger local parties.

In 1929, the organization of the party was changed. The Party Council was replaced by the Head Council, which was still organized by the Party Congress, but now the members of Council were selected from the members of the Central Committee.

The party was a member of the Labour and Socialist International between September 1930 and 1940.

== Position towards emigration ==
In Poland, the activists argued that Jews should stay and fight for socialism rather than emigrate. Marek Edelman once said "The Bundists did not wait for the Messiah, nor did they plan to leave for Palestine. They believed that Poland was their country and they fought for a just, socialist Poland, in which each nationality would have its own cultural autonomy, and in which minorities' rights would be guaranteed." When the Revisionist Zionist leader Vladimir Jabotinsky toured Poland urging the "evacuation" of European Jewry, the Bundists accused him of abetting anti-Semitism. Another non-Zionist Yiddishist Jewish party at the time in Lithuania and Poland was the Folkspartei.

== World War II ==
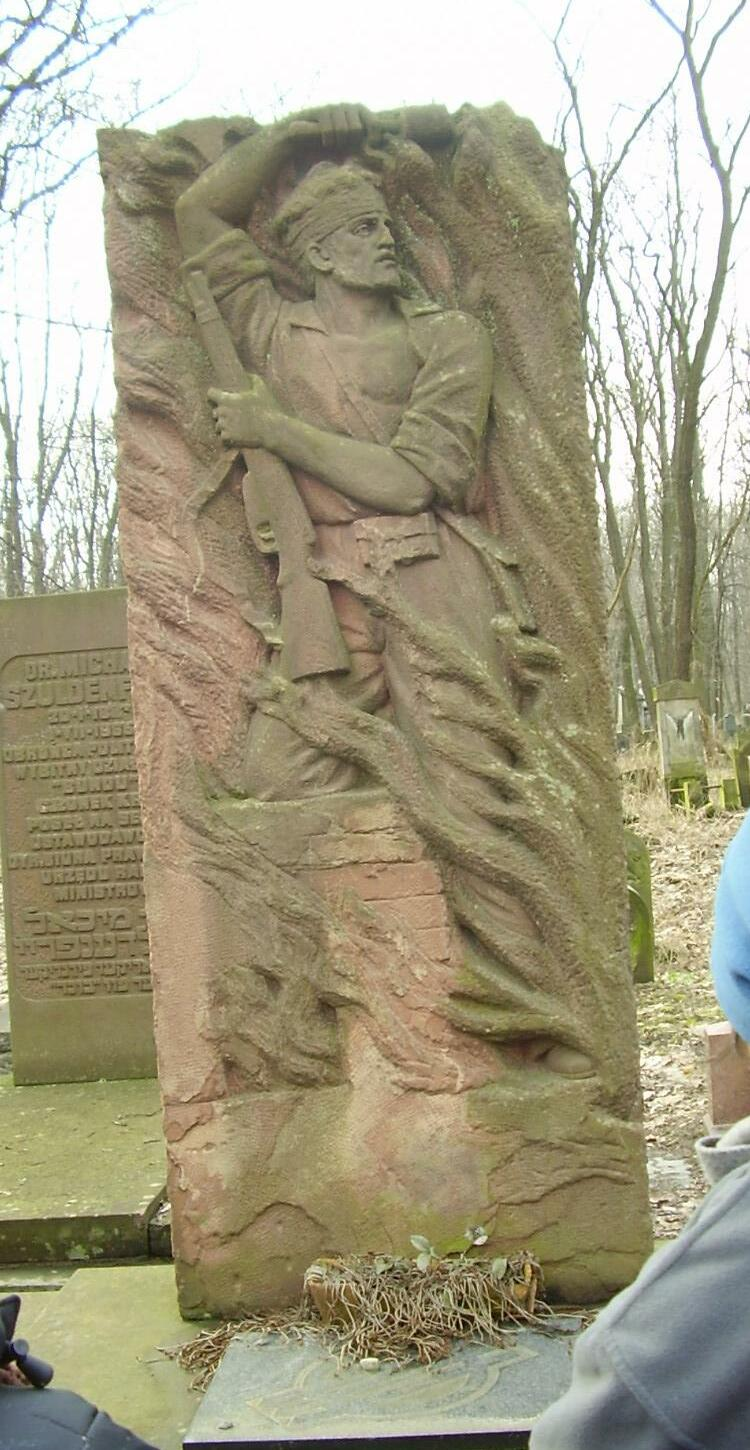
Monument to the Bund in the Jewish Cemetery of Warsaw

On 26 August 1939 the party signed the joint statement of socialist parties in Poland, calling for the people to fight against Hitlerism (other signatories included the German Socialist Labour Party of Poland).

After the 1939 German-Soviet invasion, the Bund continued to operate as an underground anti-Nazi organization in German-occupied Poland. Several Bund leaders and structures stayed in Soviet-occupied Poland and endured the Stalinist repression. Two most eminent Bund leaders, Wiktor Alter and Henryk Erlich were executed in December 1941 in Moscow on Stalin's orders under accusations of being agents of Nazi Germany.

In 1942, the Bundist Marek Edelman became a cofounder of the Jewish Fighting Organization that led the 1943 Warsaw Ghetto Uprising, and was also part of the Polish resistance movement Armia Krajowa (Home Army), which fought against the Germans in the 1944 Warsaw Uprising.

From March 1942, Samuel Zygelbojm, a member of the Bund Central Committee since 1924, was the Bund's representative on the National Council of the Polish government in exile in London. He committed suicide on 12 May 1943 as a protest against the indifference of the Allied governments in the face of the Shoah. Zygielbojm's seat in the Polish exile parliament was taken over by Emanuel Scherer.

However, as a Bundist resistant later wrote, the situation differed between the government in exile and the National Polish Council inside Poland, even in July 1944:

The illegal National Council within the country consisted of four parties, the PPS, the Peasant party, the National Democrats, and the Christian Democrats. These groups were represented in the London parliament-in-exile. So was the Bund, represented first by Artur Ziegelboim and then by Emanuel Scherer. But in Poland the National Council would not accept a representative of the Bund.

== Post–World War II ==
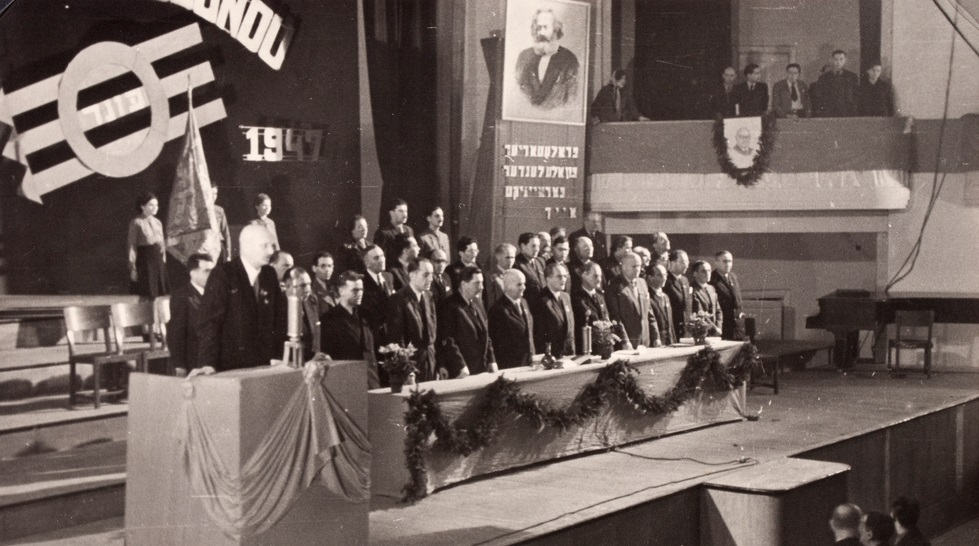
Fifty-year anniversary celebration of the Bund, 15 November 1947

After the end of the Second World War, the Bund reorganized itself in Poland. Whilst Zionists organized mass emigration to Mandatory Palestine after the war, the Bund pinned its hopes to a democratic development in Poland. At the time the Bund had between 2,500 and 3,000 members. Around 500 lived in Łódź. Michal Shuldenfrei was the president of the party, Dr. Shloyme Herschenhorn the vice president. Salo Fiszgrund was the general secretary, assisted by Jozef Jashunski. The party had functioning branches in Warsaw, Łódź and Wrocław. The party ran three publications, Folkstsaytung, Yungt veker and Głos Bundu (the latter in Polish).

The Bund began setting up various production cooperatives. Together with Jewish communists, the Bund was active in promoting Polish Jews to settle in areas in Silesia that were previously German territories.

Antisemitic activities continued in Poland after the war, and in Łódź (the main centre of Jewish population in post-war Poland) the Bund retained a militia structure with a secret armory.

The Bund took part in the Polish elections of January 1947 on a common ticket with the Polish Socialist Party (PPS). The party gained its first and only Sejm seat in its history, occupied by Michal Shuldenfrei (already a member of the State National Council since 1944); the party also won several seats in municipal councils.

In 1948, around 400 Bund members left Poland. The Bund was dissolved, along with all other non-communist parties, in 1948 following the consolidation of single-party rule by the Polish United Workers' Party. Schuldenfrei was then ousted from the Communist-led Parliament.

Many former Polish Bundists would go on to bolster and expand the Australian Bund (itself founded by a Polish Bundist in 1928); an example includes the Australian Bund's Cold War leader Bono Weiner. This includes the founders of the branch's S.K.I.F. youth movement, who modeled it after how it operated in Poland.

In 1976, Marek Edelman, a former Bundist activist and leader during the Warsaw Ghetto Uprising, became part of the Workers' Defense Committee and later part of the Solidarity trade union movement. During the period of martial law in 1981, he was interned. He took part in the Round Table Talks and served as a member of parliament from 1989 until 1993.

== See also ==
- Nowe Życie, defunct Polish-language newspaper
