= National Council of Poland =

Consulting body of the Polish government in exile (1939-1990)

The National Council of Poland (Polish: Rada Narodowa Rzeczypospolitej Polskiej) was a consulting and expert body of the Polish government in exile and Polish president. The first council was formed in December 1939 and was disbanded in July 1941 in protest to the signing of the Sikorski-Mayski Agreement. It was reactivated in February 1942, but disbanded again in March 1945 after the Yalta Conference. The third and last council was formed in 1949, and finally disbanded, together with the entire government-in-exile, after the fall of communism in Poland, in 1991.
