= Henryk Ehrlich =

Polish socialist (1882–1942)

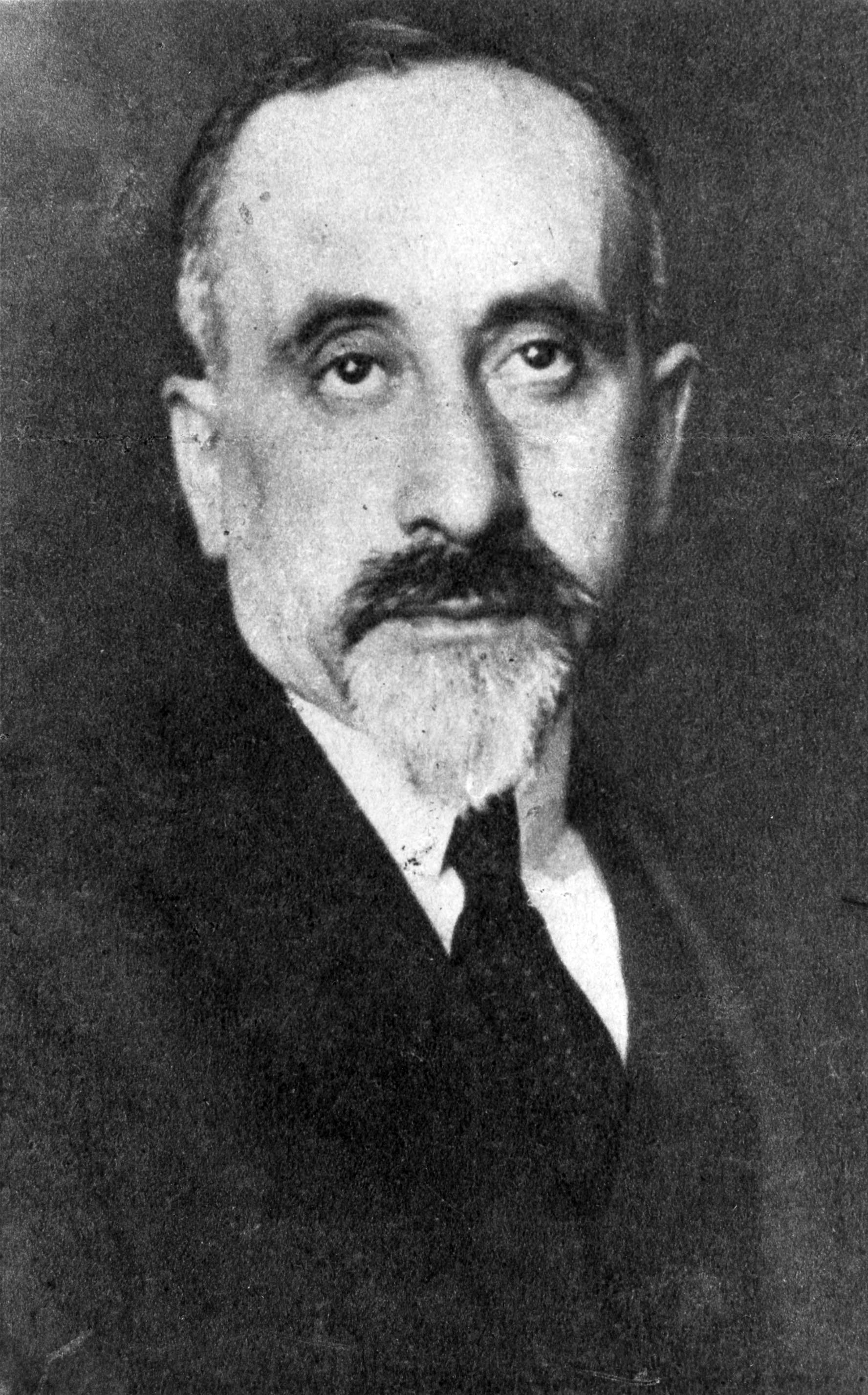
- Ehrlich c. 1920s
- Born: 1882; Lublin, Poland
- Died: 15 May 1942 (aged 59–60); Samara, Soviet Union

Henryk Ehrlich (Yiddish: הענריק ערליך, romanized: Henrik Erlikh, sometimes spelled Henryk Erlich; 1882 – 15 May 1942) was an activist of the General Jewish Labour Bund in Poland, a member of the Petrograd Soviet, and a member of the executive committee of the Second International.

== Social-democratic politics ==
Ehrlich became an activist in the social-democratic movement in 1904. During the 1917 Russian Revolution he was a member of the Petrograd Soviet executive committee, and a member of Soviet's delegation to England, France and Italy.

== Interwar Polish and Jewish communal politics ==
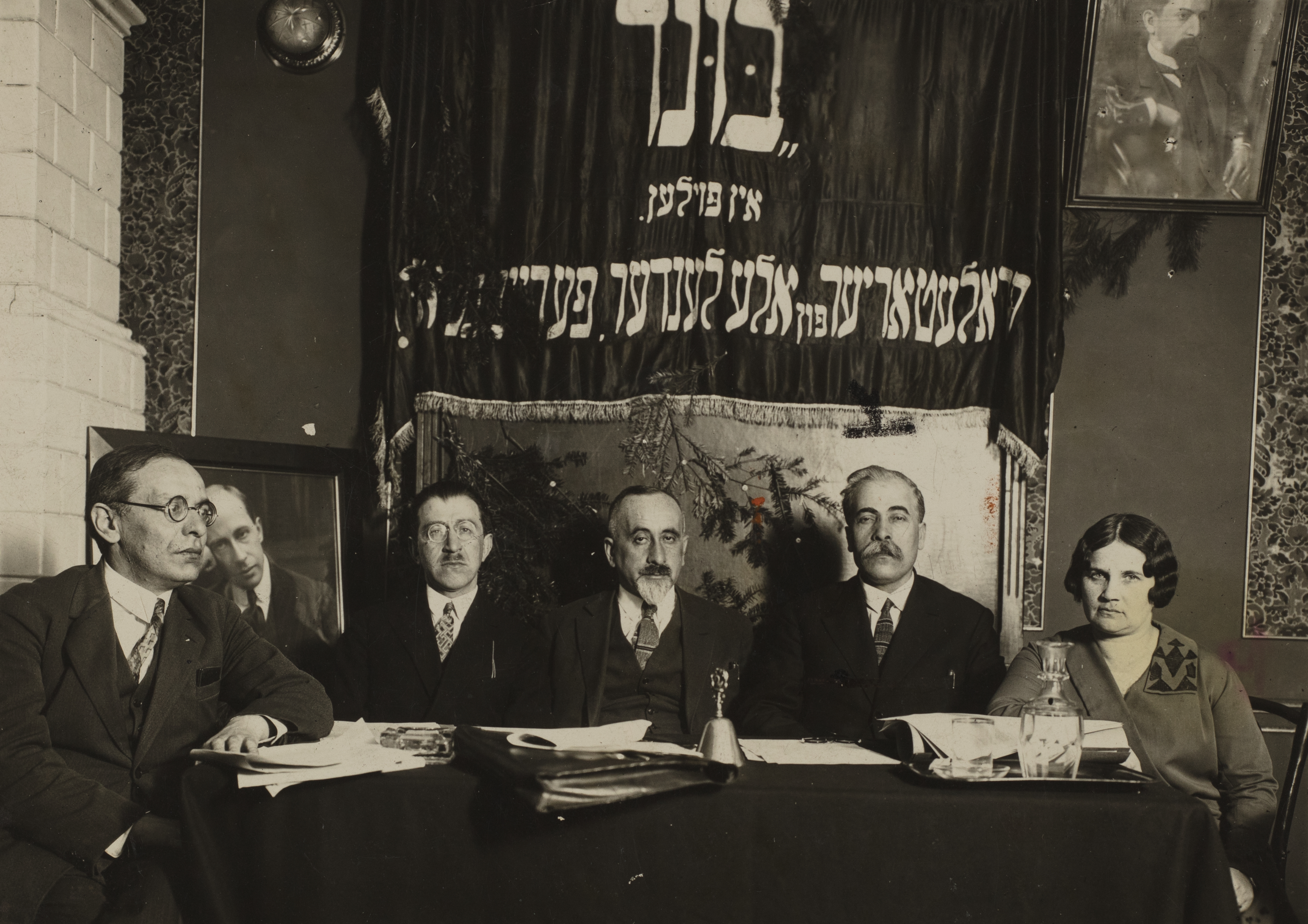
The Presidium of the Polish Bund in Warsaw, 1928. From left to right: Israel Lichtenstein, Yitzhak Rafes, Henryk Ehrlich, Ikutiel Portnoy, and Bella Shapiro.

In 1921 Ehrlich was named a co-editor of the Warsaw Yiddish daily Folkstsaytung. In 1924 he was elected to the Warsaw kehilla council as one of 5 Bundists out of 50 members. He was then candidate for the chairmanship of the council, as unique countercandidate to the Agudist Eliahu Kirshbraun, who was elected as well as Jacob Trokenheim, another Agudist, as vice-president. The Bund did not take part to the 1931 kehillot elections, but won 15 seats out of 50 at the 1936 elections. After the elections, Ehrlich created an incident by accusing Zionist leaders Grünbaum and Ze'ev Jabotinsky for recent antisemitic agitation in Poland by their campaign urging Jewish emigration from Poland. This time again Ehrlich was candidate to the presidency, he got 16 votes, the Zionist candidate Yitshak Schipper 10, and the Agudist Jacob Trokenheim won by a plurality of 19 votes.

Ehrlich remained opposed to Zionism. In a 1938 exchange, he wrote: “Zionism, in point of fact, has always been a Siamese twin of anti-Semitism and of every kind of national chauvinism.”

== World War II ==
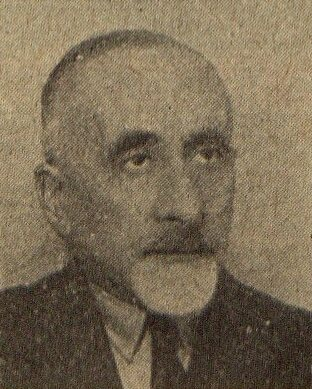
Ehrlich c. 1939

After the outbreak of World War II, Ehrlich made his way to the part of Poland that had come under Soviet control. He was arrested by the NKVD in Brest on 4 October 1939. Held in Butyrka prison, he was subjected to continuous interrogation. Reputedly, he was interrogated at least once by the NKVD chief Lavrentiy Beria in person. Arraigned in front of a tribunal, on 2 August 1940, in Saratov, and accused of terrorism and collaborating with the Nazis, he delivered a long speech denying all the charges, but after a short deliberation the tribunal sentenced him to death. After two weeks in a death cell, he was told that the sentence had been commuted to ten years in the Gulag. After the June 1941 German invasion of the Soviet Union, he was released in 1942 as part of the Sikorski–Mayski Agreement of 30 July 1941 between the Polish Government in Exile and the Soviet Union. He was asked to join the newly formed Jewish Anti-Fascist Committee, headed by Solomon Mikhoels.

== Imprisonment and death ==
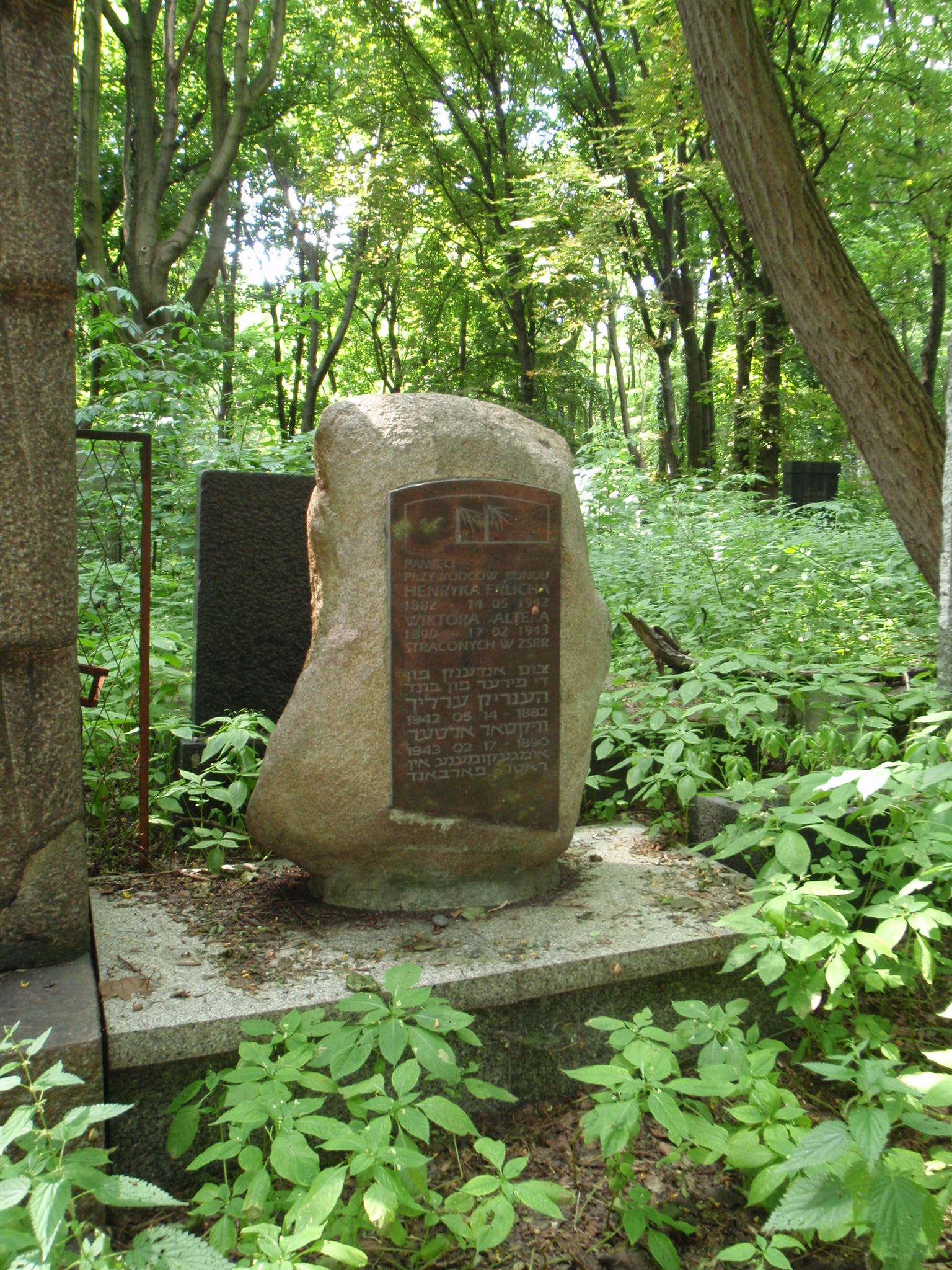
Cenotaph of Wiktor Alter and Henryk Ehrlich in Warsaw

At about the same time Ehrlich was supposed to join Gen. Sikorski (the Prime Minister of the Polish Government in Exile) in traveling to London where he was supposed to join the Polish government. However, on 4 December 1941, Ehrlich, together with Victor Alter were once again arrested by the NKVD in Kuybyshev. At the time of their arrest they both resided in the Polish embassy and no reason was given for their arrest. According to various sources at the time, they were charged with spying for “enemies of the Soviet Union”. The arrest of Ehrlich and Alter took place immediately after the Soviet government issued a declaration to the Polish government in exile on 1 December 1941, that Polish citizens of Belarusian or Jewish ethnicity would be treated as Soviet citizens and forbidden to enter the Polish Army (Anders' Army) which was being formed at the time.

The Soviet imprisonment of two prominent socialist activists and leaders of the Second International caused a wave of protests among socialist circles in the West. Eleanor Roosevelt and Albert Einstein made direct appeals to Stalin for their release. However, Soviet authorities remained quiet throughout 1942. On 23 February 1943, and only after the Soviet victory at Stalingrad, the Soviet ambassador in Washington, Maxim Litvinov, wrote to the President of the American Federation of Labor, William Green, telling him that Ehrlich and Alter had been executed on Stalin's orders.

According to some sources Ehrlich, unlike Alter, was never executed, because he managed to commit suicide by hanging himself from the bars of his prison window. Other sources state that together with Alter, he was shot in December 1942. As late as February 1943, letters from "Henryk Wiktor" (first names of Ehrlich and Alter) were being circulated in the Warsaw Ghetto.

== Rehabilitation ==
On 8 February 1991, Victor Ehrlich, Henryk Ehrlich's son, was informed that according to a decree passed under Russian president Boris Yeltsin, Victor Alter, together with Ehrlich had been "rehabilitated" and the repressions against them had been declared unlawful.

While the exact place where he was buried is unknown, a cenotaph was erected at the Jewish cemetery on Okopowa street in Warsaw on 17 April 1988. The inscription reads "Leaders of the Bund, Henryk Ehrlich, b. 1882, and Wiktor Alter, b. 1890. Executed in the Soviet Union". The establishment of the monument (as well as the publication of the full story of Alter and Ehrlich) was opposed by Poland's post-war communist government and was only made possible because of the efforts of Marek Edelman (last surviving leader of the Warsaw Ghetto Uprising and a Bundist) and members of the Polish Solidarity Union. The commemoration ceremony was attended by over three thousand people.

== Family ==
His father-in-law was historian Simon Dubnow.

== See also ==
- List of Poles
