= Victor Alter =

Jewish socialist activist and publicist (1890–1943)

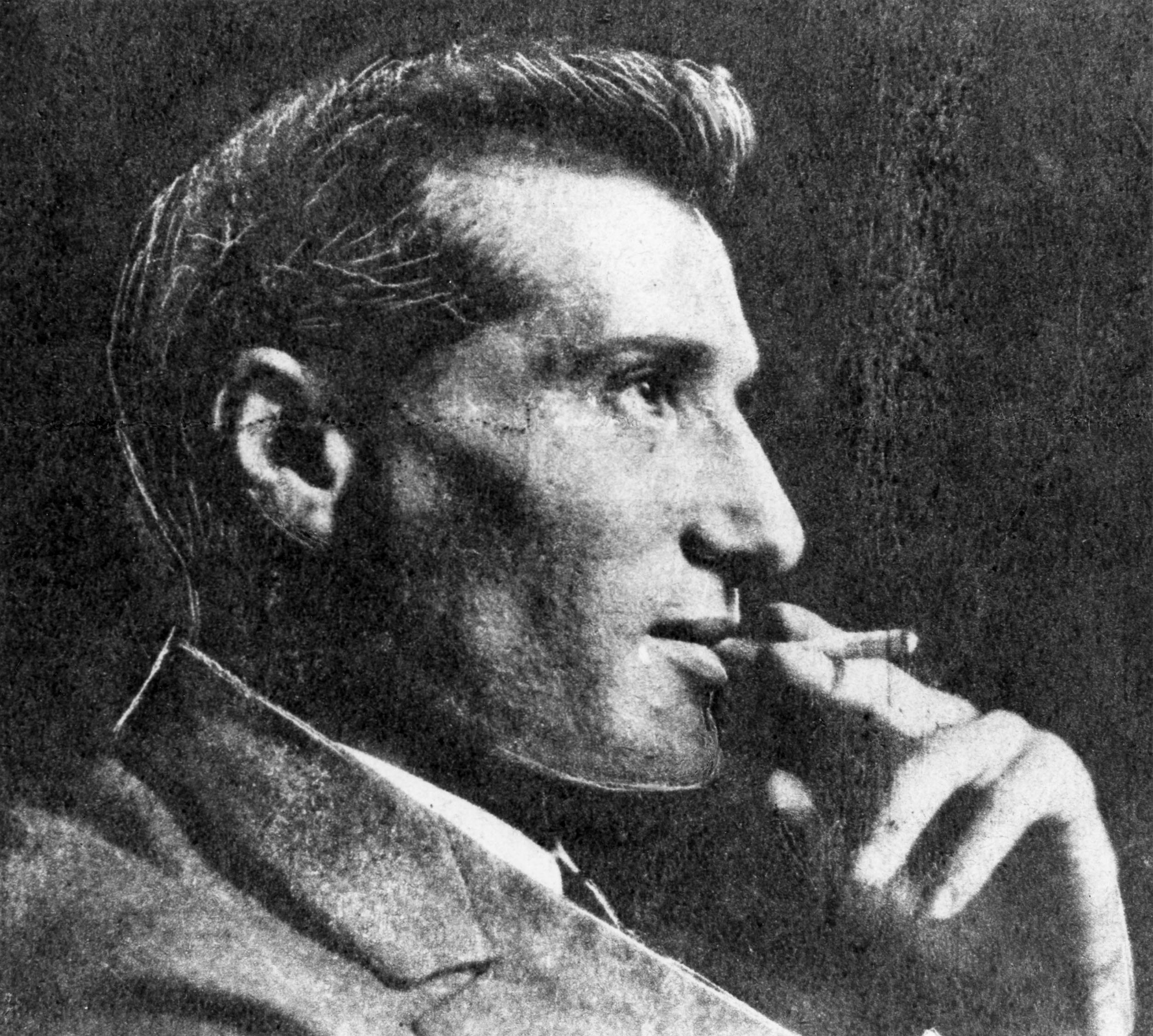
- Alter in 1936
- Born: 7 February 1890; Mława, Płock Governorate, Vistula Land
- Died: 17 February 1943 (aged 53); Kuibishev, Soviet Union
- Occupations: Bundist leader and activist

Victor Alter (also Wiktor Alter; 7 February 1890 – 17 February 1943) was a Polish Jewish socialist activist and Bund publicist, and a member of the executive committee of the Second International.

== Life ==
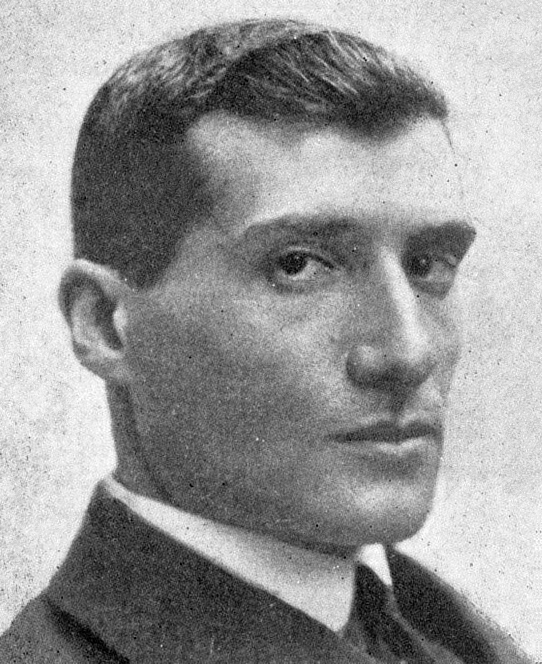
Victor Alter

Alter studied in Belgium, at the University of Ghent where he received a degree in mechanical engineering in 1912. Afterward he returned to Warsaw. In April 1913 he was arrested by Tsarist authorities for his activism for the Bund and was exiled to Siberia. He managed to escape and soon made his way to Great Britain where he joined the Labour Party. During World War I he took part in the campaign of conscientious objector and refused military service. After the February Revolution he moved to Russia. In December 1917 he became a member of the Central Committee of the Bund.

From 1918 on he resided in newly independent Poland. He was one of the leaders of the Polish Bund in the interwar period, associated with the organization's left wing. He was in favor of closer cooperation with the Polish Socialist Party, and opposed the Comintern and the Polish Communist Party. During this time he was also a member of Warsaw City Council.

In September 1939 after the German invasion of Poland, and the subsequent Soviet invasion of Poland he found himself in the Soviet occupied zone. On 29 September he was arrested by the NKVD. In July 1941 he was sentenced to death by the Soviet authorities, although the sentence was later commuted to ten years in the Gulag. After the Nazi invasion of Soviet Union, and the signing of the Sikorski–Mayski Agreement between the Polish Government in Exile and the Soviet Union he was released from the gulag.

== Execution ==
He began to organize the International Jewish Anti-Fascist Committee. During this time he established contacts with Stanisław Kot, the Polish ambassador in Moscow, and called for Polish Jews in the Soviet Union to join the Polish Anders Army. In October 1941, Alter, together with Henrik Erlich were placed by the Soviet authorities in a hotel in Kuibishev. During private conversations, which were taped and reported to Joseph Stalin, the two discussed the rumors about the murder of Polish officers, including many Polish Jews, at Katyn. On 4 December 1941, he was again arrested by the NKVD, together with Erlich and murdered, although the precise details about his death are unknown. According to some reports, he was sentenced to death on 23 December 1941, and immediately executed. Other sources state that his execution did not take place until February 1943. The death sentence was signed by Vyacheslav Molotov in a note to Lavrentiy Beria, stating that Stalin had personally approved the order.

In 1943, Soviet authorities issued a communique which announced that Victor Alter had been executed for "spying for Hitler". His execution, on Stalin's orders, provoked an international outcry.

== Rehabilitation ==
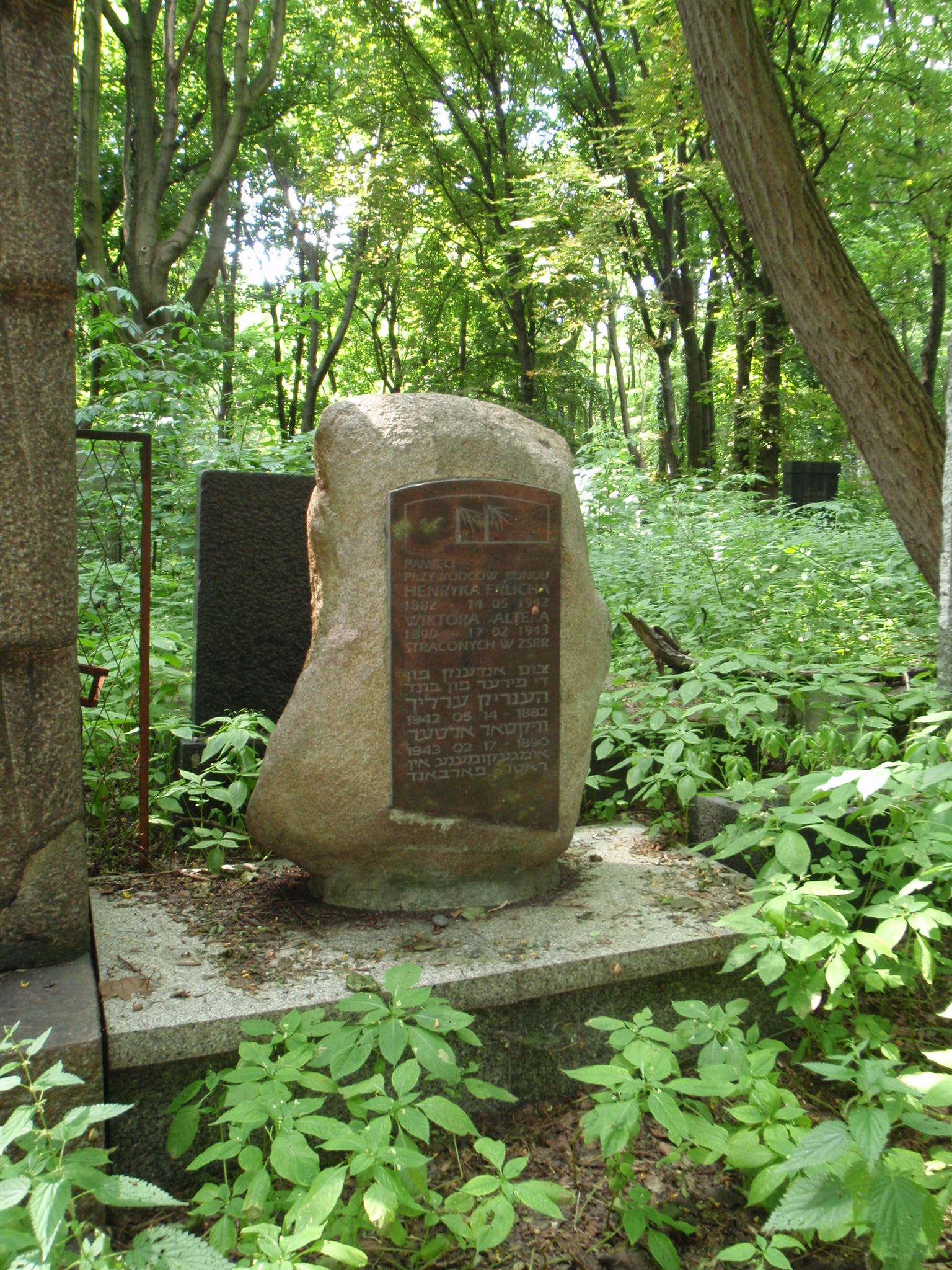
Cenotaph of Wiktor Alter and Henryk Ehrlich in Warsaw, Poland

On 8 February 1991 Victor Erlich, the son of Henryk Erlich was informed that according to a decree passed under Russian president Boris Yeltsin, Victor Alter, together with Erlich had been "rehabilitated" and the repressions against them had been declared unlawful.

While the exact place where he was buried is unknown, a symbolic monument was erected at the Jewish cemetery on Okopowa street in Warsaw on 17 April 1988. The inscription reads "Leaders of the Bund, Henryk Erlich, b. 1882, and Wiktor Alter, b. 1890. Executed in the Soviet Union". The establishment of the monument (as well as the publication of the full story of Alter and Erlich) was opposed by Poland's post-war communist government and was only made possible due to the efforts of Marek Edelman (surviving participant of the Warsaw Ghetto Uprising and a Bundist) and members of the Polish Solidarity Union. The commemoration ceremony was attended by over three thousand people.

== Publications ==
Victor Alter published several books, including:

- Antysemityzm gospodarczy w świetle cyfr (Economic Antisemitism in numbers) (1937)
- Gdy socjaliści dojdą do władzy ...! (When Socialists come to power...!) (1934)
- Socjalizm walczący (Fighting Socialism) (1926)

He also published numerous articles in the socialist press.

== See also ==
- List of Poles
- Sergei Ogoltsov
