= Teitelbaum =

Teitelbaum (Hebrew: טײטלבױם; teytlboym, deriving from a Yiddish/Germanic word meaning "date palm [tree]") is a Jewish surname. Variants include Tetelbaum and Teitelboim.

Notable people with the surname include:

- Aaron Teitelbaum (b. 1948), Satmar rebbe
- Alfred Tarski (1901-1983), born Alfred Teitelbaum, Polish-American mathematician
- Benjamin R. Teitelbaum, American ethnomusicologist
- Chananya Yom Tov Lipa Teitelbaum, Sigheter rebbe
- Chaim Tzvi Teitelbaum (1880–1926), Sigheter rebbe, author of Atzei Chaim
- Joel Teitelbaum (1887–1979), founder of the Satmar Hasidic dynasty
- Jonn Teitelbaum, founder of American restaurant chain Johnny Rockets
- Mashel Teitelbaum (1921–1985), Canadian painter
- Matthew Teitelbaum, Canadian art historian
- Michael Teitelbaum, American demographer
- Moshe Teitelbaum (Ujhel) (1759–1841), rabbi known as the Yismach Moshe
- Moshe Teitelbaum (Satmar) (1914–2006), world leader of Satmar Hasidic Judaism
- Richard Teitelbaum (1939–2020), composer and keyboardist
- Ruth Teitelbaum (1924–1986), American computer programmer and mathematician
- Sabrina Teitelbaum (b. 1997), American indie rock musician
- Yekusiel Yehuda Teitelbaum (I) (1808–1883), Hasidic rebbe in Austria-Hungary
- Yekusiel Yehuda Teitelbaum (II) (1911–1944), Hasidic rebbe in Romania and Hungary
- Zalman Leib Teitelbaum (b. 1952), Satmar rebbe
