= Tetsh (Hasidic dynasty) =

Hungarian Hasidic dynasty

The Tetsh Hasidic dynasty is a branch of the Ujhel-Siget Hasidic dynasty founded by Rabbi Moshe Teitelbaum (1759–1841), Rabbi of Sátoraljaújhely in Hungary, who was a disciple of the Polish Hasidic leader Rabbi Yaakov Yitzchak of Lublin (the Chozeh of Lublin).

Rabbi Chananya Yom Tov Lipa Teitelbaum (author of Kedushas Yom Tov), a great-grandson of the founder of the Siget dynasty, was also the Rabbi in the town of Tetsh (then Técső, now Tyachiv, Ukraine).

After assuming his father Rabbi Zalman Leib Teitelbaum's position in Siget (Sighetu Marmaţiei, Romania), and continuing the main branch of the Siget dynasty, his brother, Rabbi Elya Betzalel Teitelbaum, formerly rabbi of Polien-Ruskova (also called Havasmező), became the rabbi of Tetsh.

Rabbi Chaim Teitelbaum, Rabbi Elya Betzalel's son, succeeded him as Rebbe there until his death in the Holocaust.

== See also ==
- Tetsh (town)
