= Chaim Yehoshua Halberstam =

Rabbi of the Satmar community in Monsey, New York

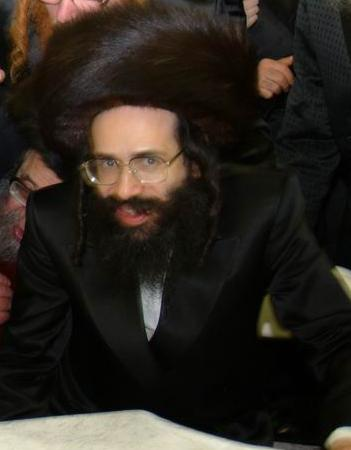
Rabbi Chaim Shia Halberstam, Grand Rabbi of Satmar-Monsey

Chaim Yehoshua Halberstam (Hebrew: חיים יהושע הלבערשטאם), also known as Chaim Shia Halberstam, is a Hasidic Jewish rabbi and the Grand Rabbi of the Satmar community in Monsey, New York. He is a son-in-law of the late Satmar Rebbe, Rabbi Moshe Teitelbaum, and a direct descendant of the first and second Rebbes of Bobov.

== Biography ==
Halberstam was born to Rabbi Yaakov Yosef Halberstam, the orphaned son of Rabbi Chaim Yehoshua Halberstam, the son of the second Rebbe of Bobov, Rabbi Ben Zion Halberstam. The first Rabbi Chaim Yehoshua Halberstam was arrested by the NKVD during World War II and died of starvation in the Tashkent prison on 19 November 1944, leaving a young wife, Leika, and two sons, Yaakov Yosef and Boruch Duvid. The orphaned family eventually moved to America, where Yaakov Yosef grew up to name his own son and his synagogue, K'hal Chaim Yehoshua of Boro Park, Brooklyn, New York, after his father.

Halberstam was also the great-great-grandson of the first Rebbe of Bobov, Rabbi Shlomo Halberstam. His mother's maiden name was Teitelbaum; she was a descendant of the Sighet Hasidic dynasty from which the Satmar dynasty originates.

He married Hendy, the daughter of Rabbi Moshe Teitelbaum (1914-2006) and Pessel Leah Teitelbaum (1922-2010).

Until the death of the late Rebbe of Satmar, Halberstam was the Rav of the Satmar synagogue, VaYoel Moshe, in Monsey, av beth din (head of the rabbinical court), and principal of the Satmar yeshiva in Monsey.

== Lineage to Satmar ==
- Rabbi Moshe Teitelbaum (1914–2006), the previous Satmar Rebbe, author of Berach Moshe; son of the Atzei Chaim.
  - Rabbi Chaim Yehoshua Halberstam, Grand Rabbi Of Satmar In Monsey, son-in-law of Rebbe Moshe Teitelbaum

== Lineage to Bobov ==
- Grand Rabbi Shlomo Halberstam of Bobov
  - Grand Rabbi Ben Zion Halberstam of Bobov, son of Rabbi Shlomo. Murdered by the Nazis near Lemberg, 4 Av 5742
    - Rabbi Chaim Yehoshua Halberstam, son of Rabbi Ben Zion Halberstam and brother of Grand Rabbi Shlomo Halberstam. Arrested by the NKVD in February 1944 and died of starvation in the Tashkent prison, 19 November 1944.
      - Rabbi Yaakov Yosef Halberstam, son of Rabbi Chaim Yehoshua Halberstam, Rav of K'hal Chaim Yehoshua.
        - Rabbi Chaim Yehoshua Halberstam, Grand Rabbi of Satmar Monsey, son of Rabbi Yaakov Yosef Halberstam.
