= Sátoraljaújhely =

- Town
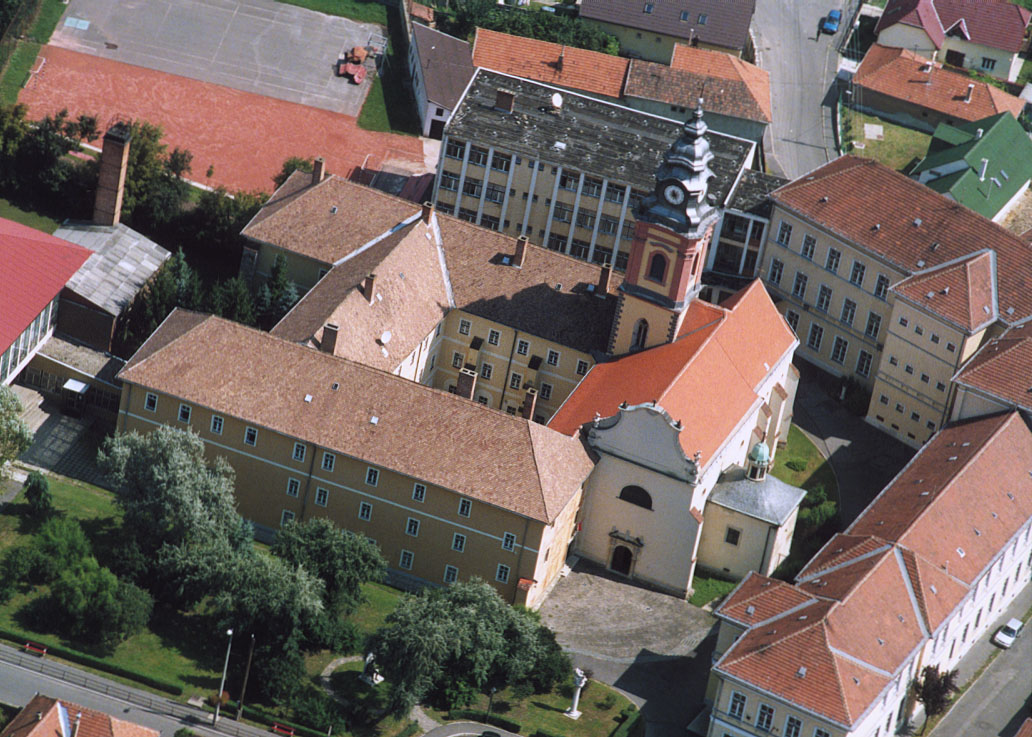
- Pauliner church and friary

- Flag Coat of arms

- Location within Borsod-Abaúj-Zemplén County Location within Hungary
- Coordinates: 48°23′48″N 21°38′59″E
- Country: Hungary
- County: Borsod-Abaúj-Zemplén
- District: Sátoraljaújhely

Area
  - Total: 73.45 km^{2} (28.36 sq mi)

Population (2009)
  - Total: 16,299
  - Density: 244.99/km^{2} (634.5/sq mi)

Population by ethnicity
  - Hungarians: 88.6%
  - Gypsies: 12.3%
  - Slovaks: 1.6%
  - Germans: 1.1%
  - Ukrainians: 0.2%
  - Romanians: 0.2%
  - Rusyns: 0.1%
  - Others: 0.5%
  - Others: 11.3%

Population by religion
  - Roman Catholic: 32.1%
  - Calvinists: 19.4%
  - Greek Catholic: 11.9%
  - Lutherans: 0.2%
  - Other: 1.8%
  - Non-religious: 12.1%
  - Unknown: 22.5%
- Time zone: UTC+1 (CET)
  - Summer (DST): UTC+2 (CEST)
- Postal code: 3980
- Area code: (+36) 47
- Website: satoraljaujhely.hu

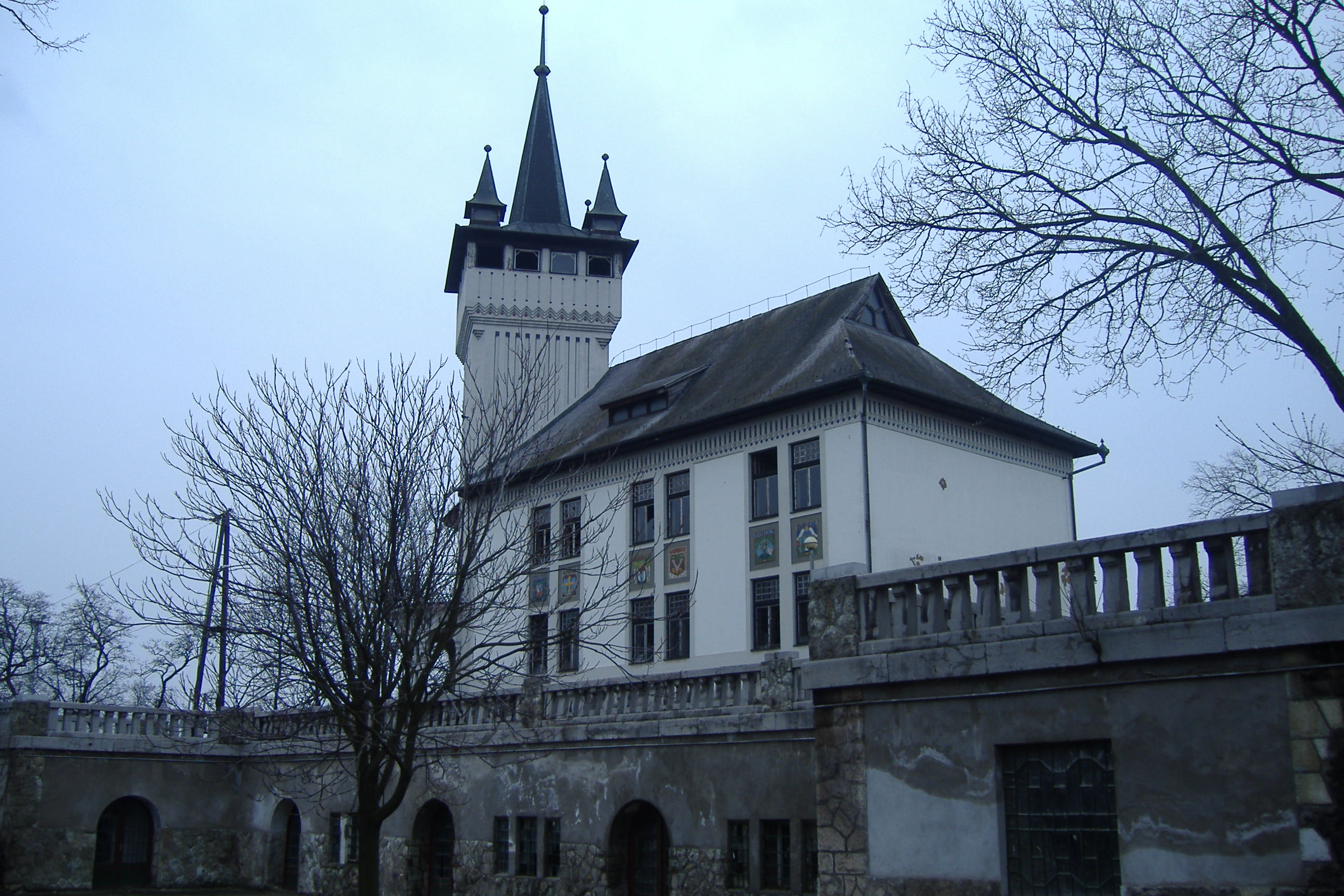
The Wine Church

Sátoraljaújhely (German: Neustadt am Zeltberg; Slovak: Nové Mesto pod Šiatrom) is a town located in Borsod-Abaúj-Zemplén county in northern Hungary along the Slovak border.

== Geography ==
The town of Sátoraljaújhely is located in Northern Hungary, on the northeastern edge of the Zemplén Mountains, near the Slovak border, 82 kilometres (51 miles) east from the county seat Miskolc.

== History ==
Sátor-alja (meaning "under the tent", referring to the tent-shaped mountain nearby) was a settlement from the Hungarian conquest of the Carpathian Basin until it was destroyed during the First Mongol invasion of Hungary. It was rebuilt in the 13th century, although there was disagreement among the citizens concerning the name: some wanted to keep the original name, and some wanted to rename it új hely ("new place"). Sátoraljaújhely was granted town status in 1261 by King Stephen V, and a castle was also built around that time.

Sátoraljaújhely has often played an important role in the region's history: revolts against Habsburg rule began there in the 17th and 18th centuries. After the Revolution of 1848, Sátoraljaújhely developed rapidly owing to its location close to important trade routes leading to Poland, Ruthenia, and Transylvania. The town's light industry led to it becoming the capital of the comitatus (county) of Zemplén in the 17th century.

Sátoraljaújhely has always been an important town in culture. Ferenc Kazinczy, one of the reformers of the Hungarian language, lived here in the 18th century. At the turn of the 20th century the town was home to a small but important Jewish community: some 4,500 of the town's 13,000 residents were Jewish. The community counted among its members Moses Teitelbaum and Michael Heilprin.

Under the Treaty of Trianon, Hungary lost its northern territories. The border was set at the Ronyva stream, splitting the city into two parts. One-fifth of the population and one-fourth of the territory of the town became part of Czechoslovakia. The newly created village got the name of Slovenské Nové Mesto ("Slovak new town") in Slovak; Szlovákújhely ("Slovak new town") or Kisújhely ("Little new town") in Hungarian. Two railway lines and the industrial zone were lost to Hungary. The town's industry was being rebuilt during the interwar period, but the outbreak of World War II disrupted this development. Nazi repression, continuous bombing after 1943, the killing of most of its Jewish population (most were forcibly sent to Auschwitz) and finally the Soviet occupation left the town in a very poor condition.

During the reorganisation of administration in 1950, the former comitatus of Zemplén became part of the united Borsod-Abaúj-Zemplén county, and Sátoraljaújhely lost its county capital status.

Sátoraljaújhely was rebuilt again and is today a national ski centre and tourism destination.

=== Jewish history ===
Abandoned Jewish synagogue and cemetery

Historically, Újhely (Sátoraljaújhely) belonged to the county of Zemplén. Documents show that in 1734 Jews were living at Sátoraljaújhely and that they were allowed to acquire real estate. It is evident that the community was then increasing; for 10 years later the Jews possessed a school which in 1829 received a bequest of 260,000 florins from Martin Raphael Kästenbaum, and which was thenceforth known by his name.

The oldest tombstone bears date of 1760, although the ḥebra ḳaddisha, with which was connected to a hospital, was not established until 1772, its founder being an itinerant rabbi named Naphtali Hirsch. The first ḥebrabook has a drawing on its title-page representing the last rites.

A synagogue was built at Sátoraljaújhely in 1790; and when it was demolished in 1887, to be replaced by a new house of worship, it was found to have 8 subterranean chambers, which probably served as safe hiding rooms from local antisemitic pogroms. The oldest document of the community is dated 1831, during the rabbinate of Moses Teitelbaum, of whom the story is told that Lajos Kossuth, afterward leader of the Hungarian Revolution of 1848, when suffering from an infantile sickness, was brought to him, and that the rabbi blessed the child and, referring to the word "ḳosheṭ" in Psalm lx. 6 (A. V. 4), prophesied his future greatness. Teitelbaum died in 1841, and was succeeded by his grandson Yekusiel Yehuda Teitelbaum, who in about year 1848 went to Gorlice.

Jeremiah Löw was then appointed rabbi of Ujhely. Löw, who was one of the leaders of the Orthodox party, was succeeded by the chief rabbi, Koloman Weisz, and the preacher Isidor Goldberger. Michael Heilprin, who acted as secretary to Minister Bertalan Szemere in 1848, was, prior to the Revolution, a teacher in the Jewish school of Újhely.

The Jews of the city in 1905 numbered 4,500 out of a total population of 13,000.

== Sights ==
- Historical downtown (with an atmosphere of 19th-century towns)
- St. Stephen Catholic Church
- Piarist Church
- Wine Church, the only known church in Hungary not owned by any denomination, as it was used to store wine in past centuries.
- Mausoleum of Ferenc Kazinczy in Széphalom
- Waldbott Palace
- Baroque town hall, a Renaissance building of the former Zemplén comitatus where Ferenc Kazinczy worked.
- Former Financial Palace, a mark of the town's great economic importance in the 19th and the early 20th century.
- Abandoned synagogue cemetery - Sátoraljaújhely was once home to Hungary's second-largest Jewish community.
- Tomb of Rabbi Moses Teitelbaum
- Chairlift in the Zemplén Adventure Park

== Notable people ==
- Gyula Andrássy, prime minister
- Lillian Cahn, co-founder of Coach, Inc. and Coach handbag designer
- Ferenc Kazinczy, writer
- Lajos Kossuth, governor
- Angelo Heilprin, naturalist
- Moshe Teitelbaum, famous rebbe
- Yekusiel Yehuda Teitelbaum (I), rebbe
- Katalin Vad, pornographic actress
- Benjamin Wolf Löw, rabbi
- Lou Lenart, American-Israeli fighter pilot, film producer, and basketball team manager
- rebbes of the Ujhel-Siget, Ujhel (Teitelbaum family of Galician origin)

== Twin towns – sister cities ==
Sátoraljaújhely is twinned with:

- Krosno, Poland (2006)
- Opole Lubelskie, Poland (2003)
- Sărățeni, Romania
- Sindos, Greece (2000)
- Waadhoeke, Netherlands (1991)

== See also ==
- Satmar, Ujhel-Siget Hasidic dynasties
- History of the Jews in Hungary
