= Teitel =

Teitel is a surname from the Yiddish word teytl (טייטל) for "date" (the palm's fruit); compare German Dattel.

It may refer to:

- Amy Shira Teitel (born 1986), Canadian-American popular science writer
- Robert Teitel, American film producer
- Yaakov "Jack" Teitel (born 1972, Florida), American-Israeli murderer
- Ari Teitel, American musician and 4 time Grammy nominee

== See also ==
- Teitelbaum
- Teitelboim
