= Faige Teitelbaum =

American Hasidic community leader (1912–2001)

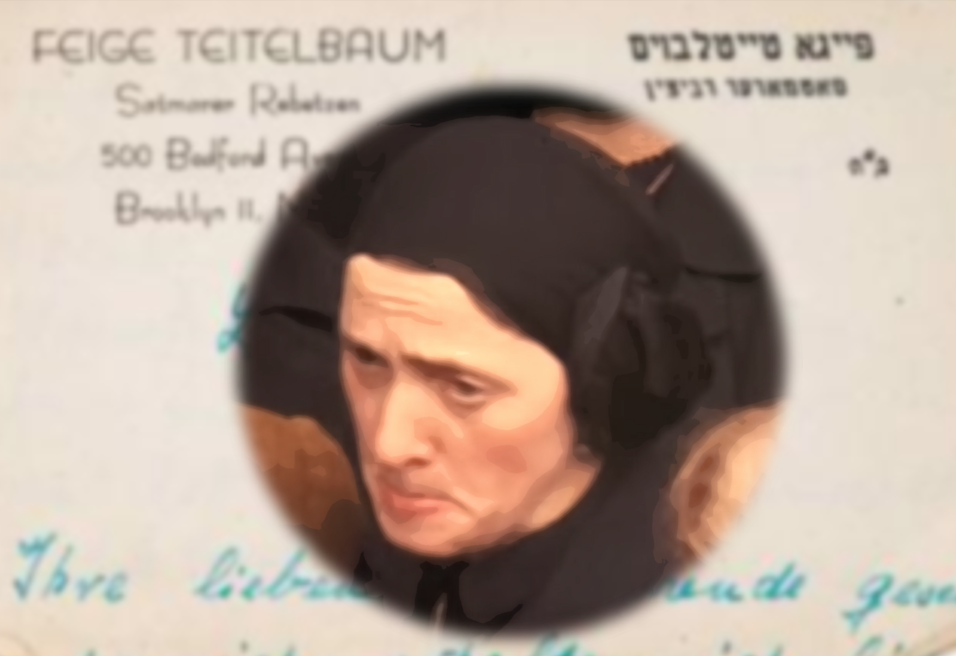
- Born: Alta Fajge Szapiro; April 16, 1912
- Died: June 2, 2001 (aged 89)
- Spouse: Joel Teitelbaum (m. 1937)

Alta Faige Teitelbaum (Note: Also spelled Feige or Feiga.) (Yiddish: אלטא פייגא טייטלבוים; born Alta Fajge Szapiro; April 16, 1912 (Note: According to data on Jewish Record Indexing based on data extracted from Polish National Archives (www.jri-poland.org). An alternative date given sometimes is 19 April.) – June 2, 2001), known as the Satmar Rebbetzin, was a Polish-born American Hasidic community leader. Teitelbaum's status as Rebbetzin was gained through her marriage to the first Rebbe (leader) of the Satmar Hasidic community, Rabbi Joel Teitelbaum (1887–1979). After her husband's death, the Satmar Rebbetzin gained a following of supporters who stood in opposition to her husband's successor, the second Rebbe of Satmar, Rabbi Moshe Teitelbaum (1914–2006).

== Biography ==
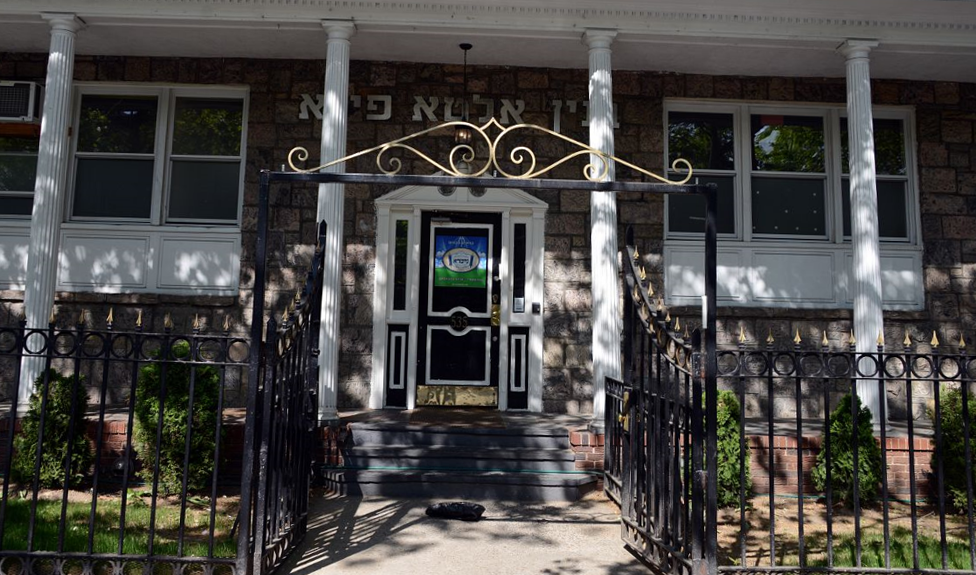
Bais Feige ("The House of Feige")

Faige Szapiro was born in Częstochowa, Poland, to Rabbi Awigdor Szapiro of the Kozhnitz Hasidic dynasty. In 1936, she married Rabbi Joel Teitelbaum after the death of Joel's first wife. Following the death of Rabbi Joel Teitelbaum in 1979 and his succession by Moshe (Moses) Teitelbaum, a nephew of Joel, a segment of the Satmar community rejected the new leadership and remained committed to the deceased Rebbe. This group became known as Bnei Yoel or B'nei Joel ("The Children of Yoel"), and many of these Hasidim would regularly petition Faige for blessings and advice as they normally would of a Hasidic Rebbe.

This was a unique position for a Hasidic Rebbetzin in the post-World War II period, and Faige Teitelbaum is viewed as the only such woman in the late 20th century to function as a de facto rebbe and leader. The center of communal activity for Teitelbaum's followers was a synagogue on Bedford Avenue which was known as Bais Feige ("The House of Feige"). The allegiance to Faige Teitelbaum was reported to be the cause of a major rift in the Satmar community, leading to a federal lawsuit between Teitelbaum and her nephew, the second Satmar Rebbe. In some cases, public violence erupted between Satmar Hasidim.

=== Legacy ===
Teitelbaum's charitable activities included establishing the Satmar Bikur Cholim kosher food distribution network for Orthodox hospital patients.

== See also ==
- Bnei Yoel
