= Bikur cholim (disambiguation) =

Bikur cholim or Bikur holim (Hebrew: ביקור חולים; "visiting the sick") refers to the mitzvah (Jewish religious commandment) to visit and extend aid to the sick. By extension, it may also refer to any (typically local) Jewish organization that visits those in hospital or provides other services for them or their families. It also may refer specifically to any of the following.

== Hospitals and medical organizations ==
- Bikur Cholim, also known as the Jewish Healthcare Foundation, a nonprofit healthcare organization in Greater Los Angeles, California
- Bikur Cholim Hospital, Jerusalem
- Satmar Bikur Cholim
- Sephardic Bikur Holim, a non-profit organization in New York and New Jersey.
- Bikur Cholim Chesed Organization of Borough Park
- Bikur Cholim of Greater Washington, a non-profit organization serving the Greater Washington DC region.

== Synagogues and congregations ==
=== In Poland ===
- Bikur Cholim Synagogue, Limanowskiego 13, Kraków
- Bikur Cholim Synagogue, Stroma 11, Kraków

=== In the United States ===
- Congregation Beth Israel Bikur Cholim, New York City, New York
- Bikur Cholim B'nai Israel Synagogue, Swan Lake, New York
- Bikur Cholim Machzikay Hadath, Seattle, Washington, one of whose predecessor congregations was simply "Bikur Cholim"
- Bikur Cholim Synagogue, Bridgeport, Connecticut
- Congregation Bikur Cholim (Donaldson, Louisiana), a former congregation and synagogue built in 1872; the congregation disbanded in the 1940s.
- Sephardic Bikur Holim Congregation, Seattle, Washington
