= Yekusiel Yehuda Teitelbaum =

Yekusiel Yehuda Teitelbaum may refer to three Hasidic rabbis:

- Yekusiel Yehuda Teitelbaum (I) of Sighet (1808–1883), known as the Yetev Lev (ייטב לייב)
- Yekusiel Yehuda Teitelbaum (II) (1911–1944), Chief Rabbi of Sighet
- Yekusiel Yehuda Teitelbaum (III), (born 1952) Satmar Rebbe, known in Yiddish as Zalman Leib Teitelbaum
