= Satmar Bikur Cholim =

Jewish non-profit organization

- ביקור חולים דסאטמאר
- Abbreviation: SBC
- Established: 1956
- Founders: Feiga Teitelbaum; Gittel Kahn
- Founded at: Brooklyn, NY
- Type: Nonprofit
- Legal status: Charity
- Purpose: Bikur cholim
- Headquarters: 545 Bedford Avenue, Brooklyn NY 11211
- Location: Brooklyn, New York, United States
- Coordinates: 40°42′17.03″N 73°57′41.08″W
- Services: Hospital meals Transportation to hospitals Apartments near hospitals
- Affiliations: Satmar (Hasidic dynasty)
- Website: satmarlbc.org

Satmar Bikur Cholim, also known as Bikur Cholim D'Satmar or Ladies Bikur Cholim D'Satmar, is a New York-based non-profit organization which aids Jewish people in New York hospitals. According to its website, it delivers 2,000 meals to hospital patients every week.

== Overview ==
=== History ===
Satmar Bikur Cholum was founded in 1956 by the Satmar Rebbetzin Faige Teitelbaum, wife of Rabbi Yoel Teitelbaum of Satmar, together with Gitel Kahn, in Williamsburg, Brooklyn. Food was prepared in Kahn's kitchen and delivered to hospitalized Jews in the area. The organization has gained a reputation of helping all Jews, regardless of their backgrounds or affiliations. In 2018, NYU Langone Medical Center expelled SBC after 30 years of cooperation, shocking the Orthodox Jewish community.

=== Services ===
Currently, the organization runs "Bikur Cholim rooms" – rooms in hospitals that supply kosher food, including chalav yisrael milk, to patients, and owns apartments located near hospitals for family members of patients to stay in. They also shuttle volunteers, visitors, and patients on a private bus line between Williamsburg and hospitals throughout New York City.
