= Yekusiel Yehuda Teitelbaum (I) =

Rebbe

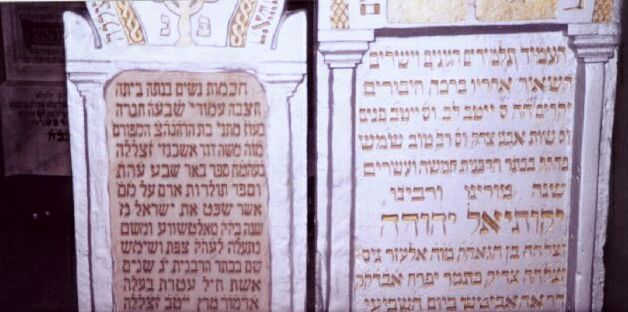
- The headstones over the graves of Rabbi Yekusiel Yehuda Teitelbaum and his wife in Sighet
- Title: Sigeter Rebbe

Personal life
- Born: Yekusiel Yehuda Teitelbaum; 1808 Drohobych, Austrian Galicia (present-day Ukraine)
- Died: 8 September 1883 (6 Elul 5643) Máramarossziget, Kingdom of Hungary (present-day Romania)
- Buried: Sighet
- Spouse: Ruchl Ashkenazi
- Children: Avrohom Aharon; Chananya Yomtov Lipa; Moshe Yosef; Elya Btzalel three daughters
- Parent: Elozor Nison Teitelbaum (father)

Religious life
- Religion: Judaism

Jewish leader
- Predecessor: Elozor Nison Teitelbaum
- Successor: Chananya Yom Tov Lipa Teitelbaum
- Began: 1858
- Ended: 1883
- Main work: Yetev Lev

Rabbi Yekusiel Yehuda Teitelbaum (1808–1883), known as the Yetev Lev (Hebrew: ייטב לב), (Note: Sometimes pronounced Yitev Lev, based on the two Yuds of his initials.) was a Hasidic Rebbe in Austria-Hungary.

== Early life and education ==
He was the son of Rabbi Elazar Nison Teitelbaum, rabbi of Drubitsh, who was the son of the Yismach Moshe (Moshe Teitelbaum).

== Career ==
After his studies, Yekusiel Yehuda, also known by his Yiddish equivalent names as Zalman Leib, was appointed as the rabbi of Stropkov (1833). He moved to Ujhely (1841) and then to Drubitsh (1856). When the Jewish community in the city of Sighet, Hungary, was looking for a new rabbi, he was invited by the heads of the community and was appointed to that post in 1858.

In addition to serving as the Rabbi of the community, he also led a yeshiva where Rabbi Yaakov Yehuda Aryeh Leib Frenkel was among his notable students. He also served as a hasidic rebbe and became known as the rebbe of Siget.

== Family life ==
Yekusiel Yehuda Tetelbaum married Ruchl, a daughter of Rabbi Moshe Dovid Ashkenazi of Tolcsva and his wife. Their sons were Chananya Yomtov Lipa, author of Kedishas Yomtov, who succeeded his father in Siget; Avrohom Aharon, who became the rabbi of Kolbasov; Moshe Yosef, the rabbi of Ujhel; and Eliyohu Betsalel, rabbi of Tetsh (Tyachiv, Ukraine) (see: Tetsh (Hasidic dynasty)). Yekusiel and Ruchl Teitelbaum also had three daughters.

Among the descendants of Yekusiel and Ruchl was their grandson Rabbi Joel Teitelbaum, the rebbe of Satmar, who emigrated to the United States after the Holocaust.

Reb Boruch of Gorlitz, son of the Divrei Chaim of Sanz, married one of their daughters. A great-grandson of Teitelbaum's from that marriage was Rabbi Yekusiel Yehudah Halberstam of Klausenberg.

== Teachings and published works ==
Yekusiel Yehuda was the author of Yetev Lev, a Hasidic commentary on the Torah, which he originally published anonymously; Yetev Ponim on the Jewish holidays, and the responsa Avnei Tsedek and Rav Tuv.

== Congregation Yetev Lev of Satmar ==
It is noteworthy that the monument of the Sigeter Rebbe, Yekusiel Yehuda Teitelbaum (1808–1883) spells Yetev with two Yuds, whereas the Congregation Yetev Lev D'Satmar spells Yetev with only one Yud ("Kehal Yetev Lev D'Satmar").

== Sources ==
Levi Grossman (1943). שם ושארית Shem uSheirith. Jerusalem.

Preceded by Moshe Schonfeld	Chief Rabbi of Stropkov; 1833–1841	Succeeded by Chayim Yosef Gottlieb
