= Bnei Yoel =

Group of Satmar Hasidim

The Bnei Yoel (Sons of Joel) are a group of Satmar Hasidim, who, after the death of Joel Teitelbaum, refused to accept the leadership of the new Grand Rabbi of Satmar, Rebbe Moshe Teitelbaum, and instead decided to remain followers of Rabbi Joel.

They are also known as:

- "The Rebbetzin's Hasidim", referring to Joel Teitelbaum's surviving wife, Alte Feiga Teitelbaum (1912-2001). (A "rebbetzin" is the title for an Orthodox rabbi's wife.)
- "keygeners", meaning those "who go against" something (in Yiddish.)
- "misnagdim," "opponents" in Yiddish, but not to be confused with the non-Hasidic movement of the misnagdim, the ideological opponents of the original Hasidic movement in the 18th century.

Some members of the Bnei Yoel have taken the side of Rabbi Zalman Leib Teitelbaum in the dispute that erupted about the succession of Moshe Teitelbaum, in which brothers Aaron Teitelbaum and Zalman Leib Teitelbaum both claimed the right to become the new Rebbe.

Some of the Bnei Yoel who have taken the side of Zalman Leib, but opposed Zalman's father, Moses, are often referred to as the "Hasidim of Ahava Mesiteres" (Hasidim of "Hidden Love"), based on a discourse of Zalman Leib.
