= Tiachiv =

City in Zakarpattia Oblast, Ukraine

Tiachiv Тячів
- City
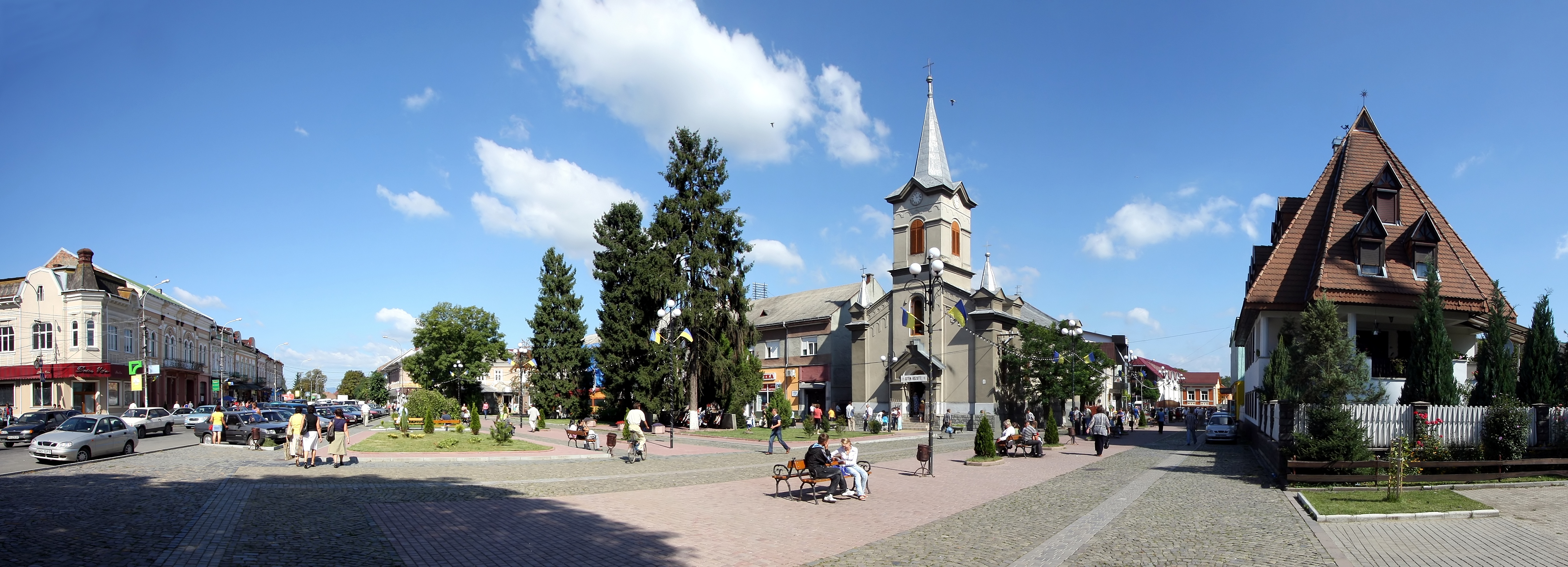
- City centre panorama

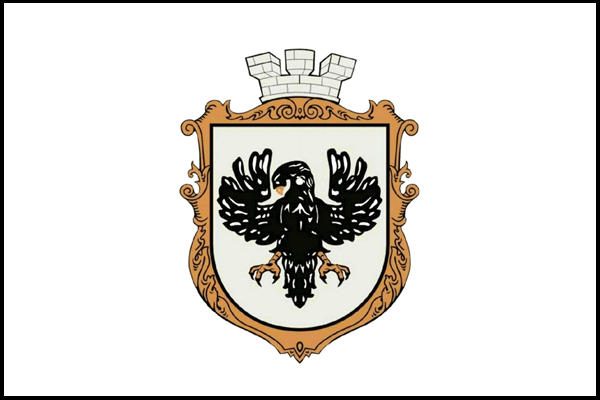
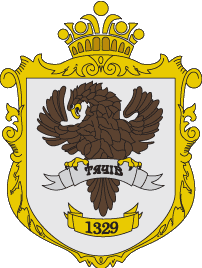
- Flag Coat of arms
- Interactive map of Tiachiv
- Map of Zakarpattia Oblast with Tiachiv Location of Tiachiv within Ukraine
- Coordinates: 48°00′41″N 23°34′20″E
- Country: Ukraine
- Oblast: Zakarpattia Oblast
- Raion: Tiachiv Raion
- Hromada: Tiachiv urban hromada
- Founded: 1326
- Incorporated: 1961

Government
  - Mayor: Іvan Kovach (Ivan Kovacs)

Population (2022)
  - Total: 8,887
  - Density: 1,839.78/km^{2} (4,765.0/sq mi)
- Time zone: UTC+1 (CET)
  - Summer (DST): UTC+2 (CEST)
- Postal code: 90500
- Area code: +380-3134
- Climate: Dfb
- Website: tyachiv.in.ua

Tiachiv (Ukrainian: Тячів, IPA: [ˈtʲɑtʃiu̯]; Rusyn: Тячово, romanized: Tyachovo; Hungarian: Técső; Yiddish: טעטש, romanized: Tetsh) is a city located on the Tysa River in Zakarpattia Oblast (region) in western Ukraine. It is the administrative center of Tiachiv Raion (district). Today, the population is 8,887 (2022 estimate).

== Names ==
There are several alternative names used for this city:

- Rusyn: Тячово, romanized: Tjachovo
- Yiddish: טעטש, romanized: Tetsh
- German: Groß-Teutschenau
- Hungarian: Técső
- Romanian: Teceu Mare
- Slovak: Ťačiv or historically Tačovo
- Russian: Тячев, romanized: Tyachev
- Belarusian: Цячаў, romanized: Ciačaŭ
- Polish: Tiaczów.

== History ==
In the year 1211, the town was mentioned for the first time as Tecu. Later, in 1333 as Thecho, in 1334 Teucev, in 1335 Theuchev. The town was founded by Saxon and Hungarian colonists in the second half of 13 century. Until 1920, as part of Máramaros County it was part of the Kingdom of Hungary. In 1939, following the annexation of the whole of Carpathian Ruthenia, the city became again part of Hungary until the end of World War II.

=== Jewish history ===
Upon the departure of Rabbi Chananya Yom Tov Lipa Teitelbaum, called the "Ba'al Kedushes Yom Tov" (Hebrew: בעל קדושת יום טוב) who was the city's rabbi until his father's death, the town replaced him with his brother, Rabbi Eliyahu Betzalel Teitelbaum.

A few years after Rabbi Eliyahu Betzalel's death, his son, Rabbi Moshe Teitelbaum, was appointed to the rabbinate, but died soon after, leaving the position vacant for several years, until he was succeeded by Rabbi Mayer Gruenwald, son of Rabbi Avrohom Yosef of Ungvar, son of Rabbi Moshe Greenwald of Chust, Hungary and progenitor of the Pupa Hasidic dynasty, who inherited the previous rabbi's position upon marrying his daughter in 1928.

Rabbi Chaim Teitelbaum, Eliyahu Betzalel's other son, was the rabbi of the community of the Sighet hasidim, and was supported by the followers of the Kosov sect as well.

Rabbi Mayer established a yeshiva for 45 teenagers (bochurim, "Yeshiva students"). In January 1940, Rabbi Joel Teitelbaum of Satmer visited the town to support his cousin Rabbi Chaim Teitelbaum's claim to the rabbinate. The settlement reached a peak of 1,000 Jewish inhabitants by the year 1940.

In late May, 1944, the Nazis marched into town. Shortly thereafter the town's Jewish residents were deported to concentration camps. Rabbi Teitelbaum was put alive in fire, and Rabbi Grunwald and his family were taken to death camps in Auschwitz. While his wife and 9 children were murdered in Auschwitz, Rabbi Grunwald survived and after the war was instrumental in establishing and strengthening Orthodox Judaism in Toronto. He died in 1965.

== Demographics ==
2001 census
1. Ukrainians (71.3%)
2. Hungarians (24.2%)
3. Russians (2.74%)
4. Other (1.70%)

In 2001, the population of the Tiachiv region included mainly Ukrainians (71.33%), followed by Hungarians (24.23%). There were 2.74% Russians. The remaining people made up 1.7% of the population.

== Geography ==
=== Climate ===
The climate in Tiachiv is a mild/cool summer subtype (Köppen: Dfb) of the humid continental climate.

Climate data for Tiachiv
Month	Jan	Feb	Mar	Apr	May	Jun	Jul	Aug	Sep	Oct	Nov	Dec	Year
Daily mean °C (°F)	−3.1 (26.4)	−0.8 (30.6)	4.2 (39.6)	10.0 (50.0)	14.9 (58.8)	17.8 (64.0)	19.3 (66.7)	18.9 (66.0)	15.2 (59.4)	9.8 (49.6)	4.1 (39.4)	−0.4 (31.3)	9.2 (48.6)
Average precipitation mm (inches)	51 (2.0)	45 (1.8)	44 (1.7)	54 (2.1)	77 (3.0)	99 (3.9)	84 (3.3)	75 (3.0)	48 (1.9)	45 (1.8)	55 (2.2)	68 (2.7)	745 (29.4)
Source: Climate-Data.org

== Twin towns — sister cities ==
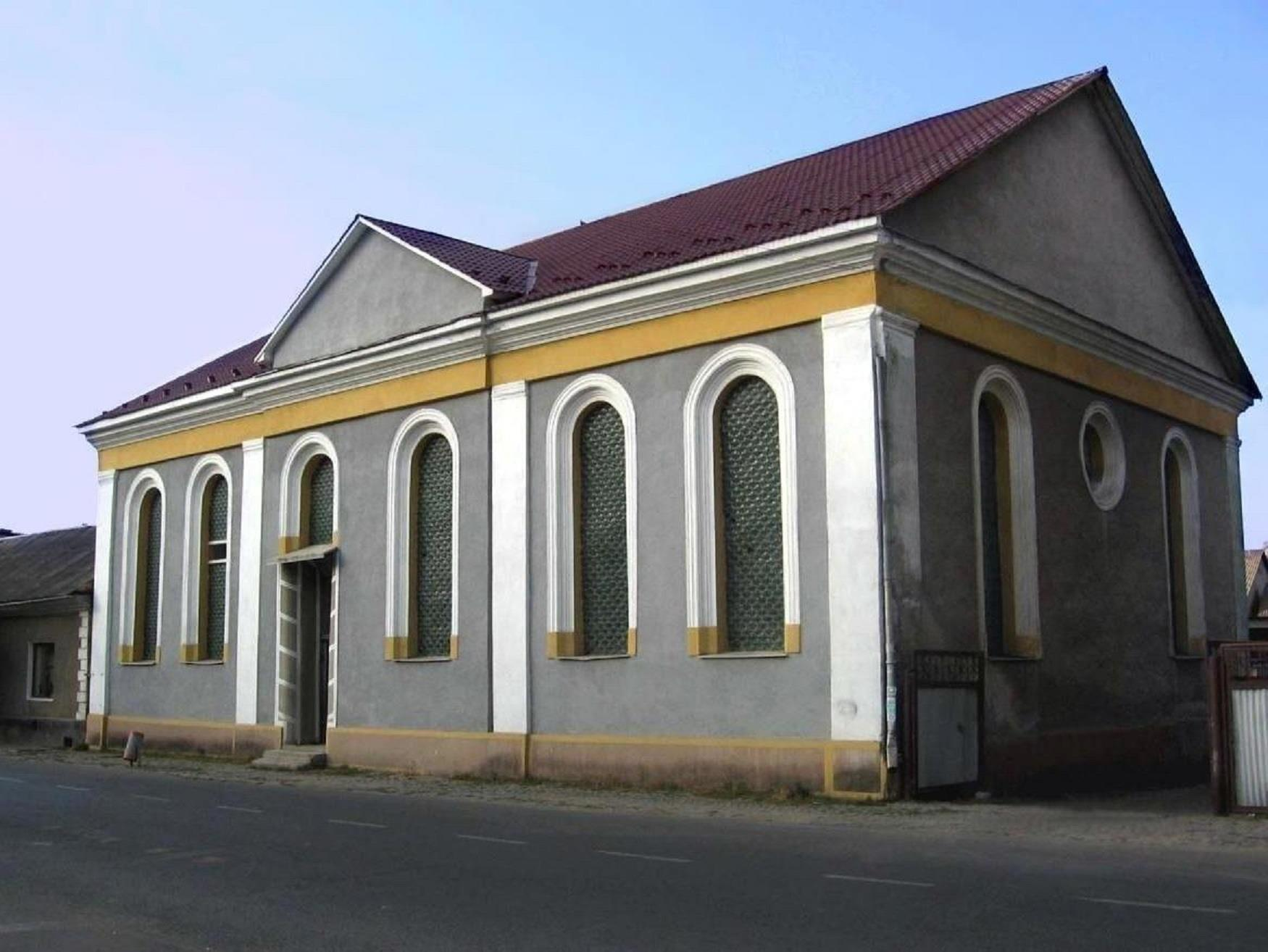
Former synagogue

Tiachiv is twinned with:

- Bucha, Ukraine
- Nagykálló, Hungary
- Jászberény, Hungary
- Kazincbarcika, Hungary
- Vác, Hungary
- Negrești-Oaș, Romania
- Bardejov, Slovakia
- Pestszentlőrinc-Pestszentimre, Hungary
- Chotěboř, Czech Republic

== Notable people ==
- Simon Hollósy, Hungarian painter and prominent teacher, a member of the influential Nagybánya artists' colony founded in 1896; he lived and taught here during the summers beginning in 1902, and died here in 1918.

== See also ==
- Tetsh (Hasidic dynasty)
