= Tiachiv urban hromada =

Urban hromada in Zakarpattia Oblast, Ukraine

Tiachiv urban hromada Тячівська міська громада
- Hromada
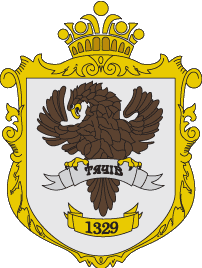
- Seal

- Location within Zakarpattia Oblast Location within Ukraine
- Coordinates: 48°00′41″N 23°34′20″E
- Country: Ukraine
- Oblast (province): Zakarpattia Oblast
- Raion (district): Tiachiv Raion

Area
  - Total: 97.8 km^{2} (37.8 sq mi)

Population (2023)
  - Total: 19,463
- Website: tyachiv-city.gov.ua

Tiachiv urban territorial hromada (Ukrainian: Тячівська міська територіальна громада, romanized: Tiachivska miska terytorialna hromada) is one of the hromadas of Ukraine, located in the country's western Zakarpattia Oblast. Its administrative centre is the city of Tiachiv.

The hromada has a size of 97.8 km^{2} (37.8 mi^{2}). Its population is 19,463 (as of 2023).

Prior to the 2020 Ukrainian administrative reforms, Tiachiv urban hromada was an amalgamated hromada established on 25 October 2015.

== Settlements ==
In addition to one city (Tiachiv), Tiachiv urban hromada includes the following four villages:

- Lazy
- Okruhla
- Ruske Pole
- Tiachivka
