= Tetelbaum =

Tetelbaum is a surname and a modification of Yiddish Yiddish Teytlboym, "Date palm". Notable people with the surname include:

- Ievgeniia Tetelbaum (born 1991), Israeli synchronized swimmer

== See also ==
- Mario Satz, Spanish poet whose full name is Mario Norberto Satz Tetelbaum
- Teitelbaum
