= Moishe Indig =

American real estate developer

Moshe Indig
- Occupations: Real estate developer Community leader Lobbyist

Moishe Indig (also known as Rabbi Moshe Indig or Rabbi Moishe Indig) is an American rabbi, community leader, newspaper publisher, and political influencer in the Satmar Hasidic community of Williamsburg, Brooklyn, New York.

He is a prominent figure in the Ahronim faction of Satmar (led by Rabbi Aaron Teitelbaum) and has been described as a "kingmaker" in New York City politics due to his influence over Orthodox Jewish voting blocs.

== Early life and background ==
Little is publicly documented about Indig's early life or exact birth date. He is a prominent member of the Aharonim faction of the Satmar Hasidic movement, an ultra-Orthodox (Haredi) Jewish sect known for its anti-Zionist stance and emphasis on religious observance.

== Career and community roles ==
Indig is a leading member of the Jewish Community Council of Williamsburg (JCCW), an Orthodox advocacy group distinct from the secular Jewish Community Center, where he serves as a key representative addressing community needs, including requests for assistance (reportedly handling around 80 per day).

Indig is the publisher and CEO of Der Blatt, a Yiddish-language, print-only newspaper affiliated with the Satmar Ahronim faction. The paper has faced criticism, including in 2020 for allegedly downplaying coverage of large indoor gatherings during COVID-19 restrictions. Indig serves as a member of Brooklyn Community Board 1 on its public safety and human services committees.

He has historical involvement in real estate as a landlord in Williamsburg. In 2010, he appeared on the Village Voice's list of "New York's Ten Worst Landlords" due to tenant complaints about conditions at a property he owned at 684 Flushing Avenue, including pest infestations and neglect. Indig acknowledged issues at the time and pledged improvements.

=== Political influence ===
Indig has been a significant political figure in New York City for over two decades, often hosting events and brokering endorsements from the Satmar community. He played a role in shifting Satmar support to Bill de Blasio in the 2013 mayoral election, securing promises on religious issues such as metzitzah b'peh practices. In 2021, his faction endorsed Eric Adams for mayor. In 2025, Indig endorsed Zohran Mamdani for NYC mayor in the final days of the campaign, despite Mamdani's progressive and pro-Palestinian positions, which divided the Satmar community (with some leaders backing Andrew Cuomo instead). Indig defended the move in interviews, emphasizing quiet engagement and community priorities. He has been described as a "power broker" who hosts politicians and influences Orthodox voter turnout to advocate for community autonomy and religious freedoms.

== Personal life ==
Indig is married and resides in Williamsburg. He manages venues such as the Rose Castle catering hall and is known for hosting events for community and political figures.
