= Bikur cholim =

Mitzvah (Jewish religious commandment) to visit and extend aid to the sick

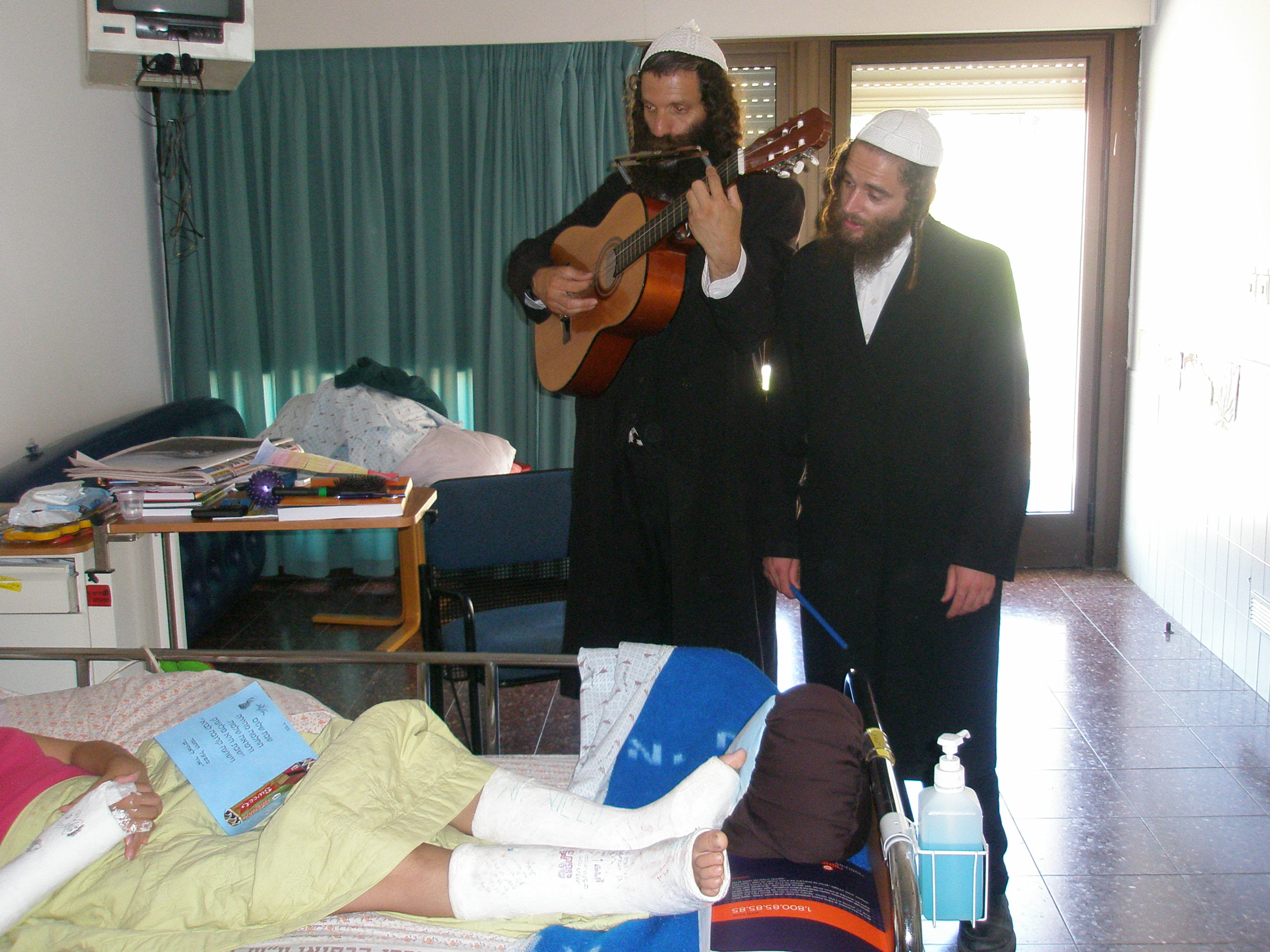
Breslov Hasidim visiting the sick in hospital.

Bikur cholim (pronounced [/biˈkuʁ χoˈlim/]; Hebrew: בִּיקּוּר חוֹלִים, lit. 'visiting [the] sick'), also transliterated as bikkur holim or bikkur cholim, refers to the mitzvah (a biblical commandment in Judaism) to visit and extend aid to the sick. It is considered an aspect of gemilut chasadim (pronounced [/ɡmiluˈt χasaˈdim/]; גְּמִילוּת חֲסָדִים, 'bestowal [of] lovingkindnesses'). It is traditional to recite prayers for healing (e.g., Mi Shebeirach) in the synagogue and Psalms (especially Psalm 119) on behalf of the sick. Bikur cholim societies exist in Jewish communities around the world. The earliest bikur cholim society on record dates back to the early Middle Ages.

== History ==
The roots of bikur holim can be traced back to the Torah, when God visits Abraham after his circumcision (Genesis 18:1).

Bikur holim is mentioned in the Babylonian Talmud several times, in Tractate Nedarim 39a, 39b, and 40a. Nedarim 39b states that "[One must visit] even a hundred times a day" and that "He who visits a person who is ill takes away a sixtieth of his pain." Nedarim 40a says that "anyone who visits the sick causes him to live and anyone who does not visit the sick causes him to die"; it also states that those who visit the sick are spared from the punishments of Gehenna (hell) and that God sustains the sick, citing the Book of Psalms chapter 31. According to the Talmud, visits should not be very early or late in the day, and one should not stay too long. Relatives and friends are urged to visit as soon as possible. It is advised that a sick person not be informed of the death of a relative or friend, lest it cause more suffering or pain.

Visiting the sick during Shabbat, often after morning services, is a common practice; the House of Shammai opposed this, but the House of Hillel viewed this as a mitzvah, and the view of Hillel became part of halakha. Additionally, in some cases, it is permissible to travel on Shabbat if a close relative falls ill.

== Organizations ==
There are many bikur holim organizations in the United States, Israel and the world. They are not connected but generally serve similar purposes.

One example in the United States is the Los Angeles metropolitan area-based bikur holim, also known as the Jewish Healthcare Foundation, a nonprofit organization that provides life-saving services and social support programs for children, adults, and families suffering from serious and life-threatening illnesses. Its programs and services include physician referrals, help with treatment costs, free loan (g’mach) of medical equipment, visitation, meals, Blood & Bone Marrow program, Direct Donor Blood, Bikur holim House, the Living Room, Hearts of Angels Volunteers, Shabbox & Shabbos Closets, Kids Helping Kids, and a multi-media library.

Another bikur holim organization, serving the Washington metropolitan area, is the Bikur Holim of Greater Washington. Like other bikur holim organizations that are located in major cities, Bikur Holim of Greater Washington serves patients who are receiving medical treatment. Bikur Holim of Greater Washington also assists patients of the National Institutes of Health.

A recently started Bikur Cholim organization is located in Dallas, TX. It caters both to local and people traveling for world class treatments in DFW hospitals, such as supporting Uterine Transplant treatment at Baylor University Medical Center. Bikur Cholim organizations typically grow to support Jewish patients in hospitals who have unique needs for kosher food, sabbath and holiday observance, and other religious related services for patients and their families.

The Bikur Cholim Coordinating Council in New York City holds an annual conference of visiting the sick that is attended by volunteers and professionals from all over.

== Sources ==
- Sefaria
- Halacha Yomit (Rav Ovadia Yossef zatsal)
- The healing visit - Insights into the Mitzvah of Bikur Cholim

== See also ==
- Satmar Bikur Cholim
- Bikur Holim Hospital
- Cedars-Sinai Medical Center
- Examples of a Rabbi (Rabbi Eliezer Berland) visiting the sicks
- 13 facts about the Mitzvah to visit the sick
- Visiting the sick
- Bikur Cholim: visiting the sick
- Bikur Cholim: visiting and praying for the sick
- Hospital visits to stranger leads to an unexpected inheritance
