= Siget (Hasidic dynasty) =

Romanian Hasidic dynasty

Siget or Ujhel-Siget or Sighet Hasidism, or Sigter Hasidim, is a movement of Hungarian Haredi Jews who adhere to Hasidism, and who are referred to as Sigeter Hasidim.

Sighet Hasidism originated in the town of Máramarossziget, Hungary (Yiddish: סיגעט, now Sighetu Marmației, Romania). Siget is the parent dynasty of the more famous Satmar Hasidic dynasty. Since 1980, the leadership of Siget and Satmar have been united in the person of the Admor of Satmar, though the two groups continue to operate separate synagogues and retain differences in certain customs.

== Founding ==
Hasidism was brought to Hungary by Rabbi Moshe Teitelbaum of Ujhel (known as the "Yismach Moshe"), a disciple of the "Chozeh of Lublin", Rabbi Yaakov Yitzchak of Lublin. The Sighet Hasidic dynasty began with Rabbi Yekusiel Yehuda Teitelbaum (I) (1808–1883), his grandson. The town of Sighet was in need of a rabbi to lead the Beis Din and answer the Jewish towns-people's religious questions. Teitelbaum applied, and was accepted. During his career, he authored his famous book, Yetev Lev.

He was succeeded by his son, Rabbi Chananya Yom Tov Lipa Teitelbaum (1836–1904). Rabbi Chanaya Yom Tov Lipa's most famous contribution to Sighter Hasidus is the work Kedushas Yom Tov, a commentary on the Chumash. After him, it would become customary for the Rebbe of Sighet to author a commentary on the Torah. He was also the father of Rabbi Joel Teitelbaum, who, at the time, was known as the illui (child prodigy) from Sighet.

After his death in 1904, it was not clear which of his sons would succeed him. Rabbi Chaim Tzvi Teitelbaum was his oldest son, and, thus, the apparent heir; but Joel Teitelbaum was the most famous of his children. Rabbi Joel accepted a position as the posek and Av Beis Din of the town of Satmar, and Rabbi Chaim Tzvi took inherited leadership of Sighet. Rabbi Chaim Tzvi authored his own work, Atzei Chaim, a name by which he himself is commonly known. He had two sons, who he orphaned early in life: Rabbi Yekusiel Yehuda Teitelbaum, who succeeded him; and Rabbi Moses Teitelbaum.

== Destruction in Europe ==
It was during the reign of Rabbi Yekutiel Yehuda Teitelbaum that the Holocaust came to Hungary. Hungary was officially a German ally, but had refused to send its Jews to Germany without knowing their exact fate. Hungary, like Switzerland and Spain, was thus perceived as a relative haven for Jews, and many Jews who could have escaped to Romania remained in Hungary, believing it to be safe. Jews from other points in Europe, including the Admor from Belz, also sneaked into Hungary to escape the Holocaust.

In 1944, however, Germany invaded Hungary and deported its Jews to the Auschwitz concentration camp, including the inhabitants of Máramarossziget. Rabbi Yekutiel Yehuda Teitelbaum and his family all were murdered in Auschwitz, with the exception of Moses Teitelbaum.

After the Holocaust, Moses Teitelbaum assumed control of the Sighet Hasidic group, and was faced with many painful and difficult questions in Jewish law. He also had to cope with the loss of his wife and children. He survived the Holocaust, and moved back to Sighet for a brief time, before the persecution of religious Hungarians by the Communists became too great. He then moved to America.

== Rebuilding in America ==
In America, Moshe Teitelbaum began rebuilding the Sighet Hasidic group within his uncle Yoel Teitelbaum's stronghold of the Williamsburg neighborhood of Brooklyn, and later moving to the Borough Park neighborhood of Brooklyn, where he established a Siget synagogue. After Rebbe Moshe Teitelbaum moved to Boro Park, his son, Rabbi Aharon, the current Satmar Rebbe of Kiryas Joel, became the rabbi of the Siget synagogue in Williamsburg.

Currently, one of his sons, Rabbi Chaim Tzvi Teitelbaum, is the rabbi in the Siget synagogue in Williamsburg. After Rebbe Moshe became Satmar Rebbe upon the passing of his uncle Rebbe Yoel, his son, Rabbi Zalman, the current Satmar Rebbe of Williamsburg, became the rabbi of the Siget synagogue in Boro Park, a post he kept until he was assigned by his father to be the rabbi of the Satmar synagogue in Jerusalem. Currently, one of Rebbe Zalman's sons, Rabbi Yaakov Ber Teitelbaum, is the rabbi in the Siget synagogue in Boro Park.
