= Moshe Teitelbaum (Ujhel) =

Rebbe

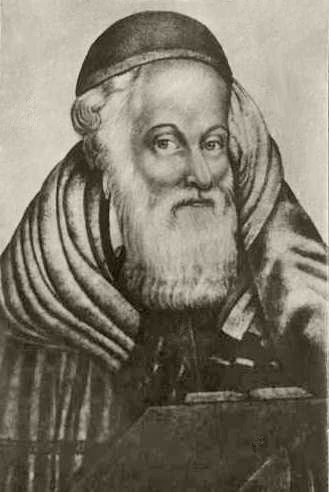
Moshe Teitelbaum

A Jewish amulet, consisting of various Divine Names, attributed to the Yismach Moshe

Moshe Teitelbaum (Yiddish: משה טייטלבוים; 1759 - July 17, 1841), also known as the Yismach Moshe, was the Rebbe of Ujhely (Sátoraljaújhely) in Hungary. According to Leopold Löw, he signed his name "Tamar", this being the Hebrew equivalent of Teitelbaum, which is the Yiddish for "date palm" (compare German "Dattelbaum"). An adherent of the Polish Hasidic rebbe Yaakov Yitzchak of Lublin. Teitelbaum was instrumental in bringing Hasidic Judaism to Hungary. Though initially opposed to Hassidism, after his son-in-law introduced him to Jacob Isaac Horowitz, he soon became an adherent.

Teitelbaum first served as a rabbi in Przemyśl, and later in Ujhely, where he was called in 1808. In Ujhely he founded a Hassidic congregation which was independent of the Galician leaders. In 1822 Teitelbaum was suspected of having supplied amulets to certain Jewish culprits who had been cast into prison for libel, in order to assist them in escaping. When called upon to vindicate himself he declared that the amulets in question served only as substitutes for the mezuzah and that their only purpose was to protect their bearers against demons. Teitelbaum enjoyed an enviable reputation, with even Moses Sofer paying him homage.

== Works ==
Teitelbaum authored three main works, "Moses Responded" (Hebrew: השיב משה), a collection of responsa), Tefillah Le-Mosheh (תפלה למשה, a commentary on Psalms), and "Moses Rejoiced" (ישמח משה, 1849; 2d ed. 1898, containing homilies on the Torah), and he is commonly referred to by the title of the latter. He originally wrote a significant portion of his commentary on Psalms on the backs of personal notes handed to him by petitioners seeking his aid and blessing. These notes were transmitted via a succession of prominent hasidic rabbis, until finally being edited and published for the first time in Kraków in 1880.

His descendants became leaders of the communities of Sighet and Satmar known as Satmar Hasidim, and his name 'Moshe' was the inspiration for the Vayoel Moshe series of books authored by his descendant, Yoel Teitelbaum of Satmar. He was said to have identified his three prior gilgulim (incarnations in Kabbalistic terminology), saying that in his first gilgul he had been a sheep in Yaakov Avinu's flock, in his second incarnation he lived in the time of Moses, and in his third incarnation he lived during the time of the destruction of the First Temple. Out of humility, he did not disclose the nature of the third incarnation, but his followers asked another Rebbe, who identified it as the Biblical Prophet Jeremiah. Regarding the first gilgul, he taught his followers the song, he said, that he recalled Jacob would sing as he tended the sheep. The song, Yankel hut eine kleine Lamm, is not related to the modern Mary Had a Little Lamb.

His followers would teach of his previous identification with Jeremiah, and how this affected his present life. In his later days he yearned so much for the coming of the Jewish Messiah and the rebuilding of the Temple, that he wore his Shabbat clothing the entire week, anticipating the Messiah's arrival. He died on July 17, 1841.

== See also ==
- Teitelbaum
