= Chaim Tzvi Teitelbaum =

Hungarian-born Romanian rabbi (1879–1926)

Rabbi Chaim Tzvi Teitelbaum (December 28, 1879 – January 21, 1926) (6 Shevat 5686 on the Hebrew calendar), was the Rebbe of Sighet and the author of Atzei Chaim. He was the oldest son of Rabbi Chananya Yom Tov Lipa Teitelbaum, the Kedushas Yom Tov. He was the elder brother of Rabbi Joel Teitelbaum, and the father of Rabbi Moshe Teitelbaum, both rebbes of Satmar.

== Biography ==
Chaim Tzvi Teitelbaum married Bracha Sima Halberstam, a sister of Rebbitzen Chaya Freidel Halberstam, who was the wife of Rabbi Ben Zion Halberstam, the second Bobover Rebbe. Together, they had four children. One was Rabbi Moshe Teitelbaum, the late Satmar Rebbe. Another was Rabbi Yekutiel Yehuda Teitelbaum, who succeeded him as Sigheter Rebbe until he was murdered in the Holocaust. One daughter married Rabbi Yekusiel Yehudah Halberstam, the Sanz-Klausenburg'er Rebbe, but she also was murdered in the Holocaust. Their youngest daughter, Chana, married Rabbi Yechiel Yehuda Isaacson, who was known as the Rav of Achuza-Haifa.

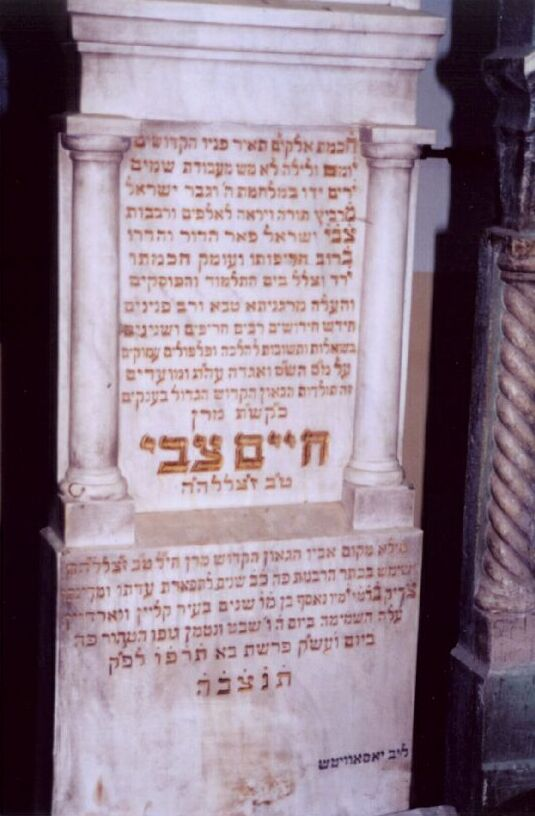
Tombstone of Chaim Tzvi Teitelbaum

Rabbi Teitelbaum had thousands of followers.

== Works ==
- Atzei Chaim – a Hasidic commentary on the Torah
- Atzei Chaim – commentary on moadim
- Atzei Chaim – commentary on meshechtes Gittin
- Atzei Chaim – Shalios utshovos responsa
- Atzei Chaim – commentary on hilchos mikvahos
- Atzei Chaim – commentary on Tehilem

== Notable students ==
- Rabbi Shlomo Zalmen Friedman, Rabbi of Tenke (Hungary, and later in Brooklyn, New York)
- Rabbi Mordechai Wulliger, author of many books, including – Otzer Hashas Kovetz Hatosfes Pardes Mordechai Tefillos Mordechai
- Rabbi David Hoch
- Rabbi Chaim Shmuel Kleinman
- Rabbi Avrohom Yosef Kleinman
