= Teitelboim =

Teitelboim is a surname that may refer to:

- Volodia Teitelboim (1916–2008), Chilean communist politician, lawyer, and author
- Claudio Bunster (born 1947) (formerly Claudio Teitelboim), Chilean theoretical physicist
- Dora Teitelboim (1914–1992)
