= Chananya Yom Tov Lipa Teitelbaum =

Rebbe

- Title: Sigeter Rebbe

Personal life
- Born: Chananya Yomtov Lipa; 22 May 1836 Sztropkó, Kingdom of Hungary (present-day Slovakia)
- Died: 15 February 1904 (aged 67) Máramarossziget, Kingdom of Hungary (present-day Romania)
- Children: Chaim Tzvi Teitelbaum; Joel Teitelbaum
- Parents: Yekusiel Yehuda Teitelbaum (father); Ruchl Ashkenazi (mother)

Religious life
- Religion: Judaism

Jewish leader
- Predecessor: Yekusiel Yehuda Teitelbaum
- Successor: Chaim Tzvi Teitelbaum
- Began: September, 1883
- Ended: 15 February 1904
- Main work: Kedushath Yom Tov

Chananya Yom Tov Lipa Teitelbaum (22 May 1836 – 15 February 1904) was the Grand Rebbe of Siget, and the author of Kedushath Yom Tov, a Hasidic commentary on the Torah he wrote in 1895.

== Biography ==
Rabbi Teitelbaum was born in Sztropkó, the son of Rabbi Yekusiel Yehuda Teitelbaum of Máramarossziget, the Yeitev Lev, and Ruchl Ashkenazi, the daughter of Rabbi Moshe Dovid Ashkenazi of Tolcsva. He served as rabbi at Técső, before he went to Sighet after his father's death in 1883.

He had two sons: Rabbi Chaim Tzvi Teitelbaum, the author of Atzei Chaim; and Rabbi Joel Teitelbaum, author of Divrei Yoel and VaYoel Moshe, who was the rabbi of Satmar, before he became the Rebbe of the Satmar Hasidic community.
