= Moshe Teitelbaum (Satmar) =

Hasidic rabbi

Rebbe Moshe Teitelbaum
- משה טײטלבױם
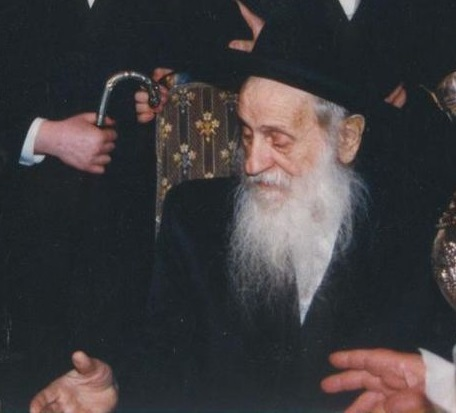
- Rebbe Moshe Teitelbaum

Personal life
- Born: November 17, 1914 Újfehértó, Hungary
- Died: April 24, 2006 (aged 91) Williamsburg, Brooklyn, New York City, United States
- Buried: Kiryas Joel, New York
- Spouse: Leah Meir (m. 1936; died 1944) Pessel Leah (m. 1946)
- Children: 10, including Aaron and Zalman
- Parent: Chaim Tzvi Teitelbaum (father)
- Dynasty: Satmar
- Occupation: Rabbi

Religious life
- Religion: Judaism
- Denomination: Hasidic

Jewish leader
- Predecessor: Joel Teitelbaum
- Successor: Aaron Teitelbaum; Zalman Leib Teitelbaum (disputed)
- Dynasty: Satmar

Moshe Teitelbaum (Yiddish: משה טײטלבױם; 17 November 1914 – 24 April 2006) was a Hungarian-American and Hasidic rebbe and the world leader of the Satmar court of Hasidic Judaism.

== Early life ==
Moshe Teitelbaum was born on November 17, 1914, in Újfehértó, Hungary. He was the second son of Chaim Tzvi Teitelbaum, author of the Atzei Chaim, the previous Sigeter Rebbe. His mother, Bracha Sima, hailed from the prominent Halbershtam family. Moshe and his older brother, Yekusiel Yehuda Teitelbaum, were orphaned in 1926, when they were eleven and fourteen, respectively. Moshe was raised by family friends and relatives, including his uncle, Joel Teitelbaum, and his grandfather, Shulem Eliezer Halberstam of Ratzfert (now Újfehértó).

Teitelbaum received semikha (rabbinical authorisation) and was appointed dean of the Karacscka yeshiva. In 1936, Teitelbaum married Leah Meir, daughter of Hanoch Heinoch Meir of Karecska. In 1939, he became the rabbi of Senta, Yugoslavia (now Serbia).

In late spring 1944, the Hungarian government, assisted by Nazi forces led by Adolf Eichmann, began deporting Jews en masse during the Holocaust in Hungary. Teitelbaum and his wife Leah were sent to the Auschwitz concentration camp, where his wife and three children were murdered, and he nearly died. Teitelbaum was then transferred to the Brabag plant in Tröglitz (now Elsteraue), and afterwards to Theresienstadt Ghetto in the Nazi puppet state of the Protectorate of Bohemia and Moravia, where he was liberated in 1945.

== Post-war ==
In 1946, Teitelbaum married Pessel Leah, the daughter of Aaron Teitelbaum of Velave in the newly-established Second Hungarian Republic. Pessel Leah's entire family had been killed in the Auschwitz concentration camps.

The couple initially moved back to Senta in the Socialist Republic of Romania, which had the largest population of Jews in Europe after WWII and where Teitelbaum had led a congregation before the war. When he found out that his brother Yekusiel Yehuda Teitelbaum had been murdered in the Holocaust, he decided to fill his brother's position as rabbi of Sighet. Soon thereafter, they were forced to flee Communist persecution, leaving for Prague and then setting sail for New York City, where they arrived in fall 1947. There, Teitelbaum became known as the Sigeter Rebbe, leading the Siget Court previously led by his ancestors. He initially established a beth midrash called Atzei Chaim Siget in Williamsburg, Brooklyn. He moved to Borough Park, Brooklyn in 1966.

== Appointment to Satmar Rebbe ==
In 1979, Moshe's uncle Joel died, without an heir to inherit leadership of Satmar. The most logical successor was his nephew Moshe, then at the aged 66. He was considered intelligent, a scholar, and a good speaker. There was some uneasiness about appointing Moshe, because in the years prior, led his own Hasidic group, and did not necessarily have the same absolutist outlook, level of scholarship, or intense piety, as his late uncle. Nevertheless, it was understood that the community was better off with a leader, and having Moshe as the Rebbe was the best for the community under the given circumstances. The Satmar Council of Elders was a thirteen-member lay-person body elected by Satmar Hasidim. The Council unanimously decided on Moshe as their next Rebbe. Moshe could have turned down the appointment and remained as leader of his small Sighet sect, but leadership of Satmar promised far more power and prestige. The Council and Moshe then negotiated and planned the details of Moshe's official appointment. A few weeks later, on one day's notice, a general meeting in the Congregation Yetev Lev D'Satmar on Rodney Street in Brooklyn was announced. At the meeting, in which Moshe was not present, Sender Deutsch, leader of the Council, announced they had appointed Moshe as the new Satmar rebbe.

Moshe refused to be accepted as the new rebbe within the first year of Joel's death. This was done as a sign of bereavement (Yiddish: אַבֿלות, romanized: avéyles for his uncle, who helped raise him when his father died, and to allow the Satmar community to mourn and adjust to the transition. Moshe continued to live in Borough Park and lead his Sighet community.

Around August 1980, Moshe formally succeeded Joel as the Satmar Rebbe in an elaborate "crowning" in Kiryas Joel, New York. At the ceremony, Moshe spoke and acknowledged that he cannot replace Joel, telling the Hasidim not to expect from him what they received from Joel.

Some Satmar Hasidim did not accept him as the rebbe, including the Bnei Yoel (Yiddish: קעגנערס, romanized: Kegners, lit. 'opponents'), a group loyal to Joel's wife, Feyge. Moshe Teitelbaum and his aunt Feyge never had a good relationship. Tension between the two began back when Feyge married Joel; she was Joel's second wife, and Joel already had a grown daughter. The grown daughter and Feyge fought over control of the household, and Moshe sided with his cousin against his aunt. Later, Joel's daughter died, and Feyge failed to bear any children and an heir for Joel.

== As Satmar Rebbe ==
Moshe's start as Satmar Rebbe was marked with more controversy. Soon after becoming Rebbe, Moshe appointed his son Aaron as the chief rabbi and rosh yeshiva of the Satmar congregation in Kiryas Joel, New York, essentially giving him authority over all the community's affairs. The residents of Kiryas Joel at that time resented the appointment of Aaron, having issues with his personality and controlling nature. Moshe also removed Joel's established personnel from positions of authority, and replaced them with his loyalists.

Concerns about Moshe's level of piety also mounted. Likely false rumors circulated that in the negotiations between the Council and Moshe, prior to Moshe ascending as Rebbe, Moshe made numerous compensation demands, including demands that property be placed in his name, and special fees for High Holiday services. Other likely false rumors claimed that Moshe was engrossed in business, had a stock market ticker-tape in his house, and was busy promoting his real estate investments.

As Rebbe, Moshe recognized his stature relative to his uncle Joel's, and considered himself a "custodian" of what Joel had created. He stated: "We must not blaze new trails, but study the teachings of my uncle." He continued many of the customs enacted by Joel. The differences between Joel and Moshe were noted in that, unlike the more mystical Joel, Moshe was more practical and plain-spoken. Moshe did not speak out against Zionism as often as Joel, though that may be due to the fact that it did not have the same ideological draw during Moshe's tenure. Some complained that Moshe was not as charitable as Joel, though that may be because Moshe did not raise as much charity funds as the more charismatic Joel.

In 1989, tensions between Moshe and the Bnei Yoel were exacerbated. In an April 1989 Passover speech, Moshe referred to the Bnei Yoel as "infidels". He later enacted a rule that new residents had to obtain permission from village leaders before moving in. In 1990, the two groups erupted in violence when a supporter of Feyge tried to erect a gate outside her home. A melee erupted, hundreds of angry Hasidim poured into the streets, three men were dragged from a car that was then set on fire, and three police officers were injured. Supporters of Alte Feyge in Kiryas Joel claimed that they had been physically attacked and profanities written on their sidewalk.

Under Moshe's guidance, from 1980 until 2006, Satmar doubled in size to around 100,000–120,000 followers, the largest Hasidic group in the United States. At the time of his death, Satmar's real estate holdings were valued at hundreds of millions of dollars.

Moshe Teitelbaum was the author of a five-volume Hasidic commentary on the Bible entitled Berach Moshe.

== Succession ==
In May 1999, Moshe Teitelbaum appointed his third son, Zalman, as the local leader of the Williamsburg congregation. Until then, he had been the leader of Satmar in Jerusalem. This was seen as a signal from Moshe that Zalman was to lead Satmar after his death, overturning the previous assumption that he would be succeeded by his eldest son, Aaron. He was his father's representative in communal affairs, and assumed his father's responsibilities when his father traveled.

Moshe's appointment of Zalman as the local leader caused factions to form around Aaron and Zalman. Aaron's supporters claimed that Moshe had been "swayed by his advisers" to appoint Zalman because they were concerned they would lose influence under Aaron's regime.

In April 2006, when Moshe died, the two sides negotiated through intermediaries over who would speak at his funeral, and in what order. Both sides declared their leader as the Rebbe.

Moshe's will named Zalman as his successor, but Aaron's supporters dispute its validity, claiming that Moshe had suffered from dementia since 1997.

== Death ==
On April 24, 2006, at the age of 91, Teitelbaum died of cancer. Tens of thousands of members of the Jewish community attended his funeral and burial procession in Williamsburg, Brooklyn, and later in Kiryas Joel. Eulogies at Congregation Yetev Lev D'Satmar in Williamsburg were delivered by all the Rebbe's children or their husbands, in order of their ages. Teitelbaum was buried near his uncle Joel in the sect's cemetery in Kiryas Joel.

Moshe was survived by his wife; four sons, Aaron, Lipa, Zalmen Leib, and Shulem; two daughters, Bracha Meisels and Hendy Halberstam. At the time of his death, he had at least 86 grandchildren and great-grandchildren. At the time of his death, his first son, Aaron, and his third son, Zalman Leib, each claimed leadership of Satmar. The second son, Lipa, was the leader of a small congregation, Zenta-Beirach Moshe Shul in Williamsburg. His son-in-law, Chaim Shia Halberstam, was a Satmar rebbe in Monsey, New York.
