= Yekusiel Yehuda Teitelbaum (II) =

Hungarian rabbi

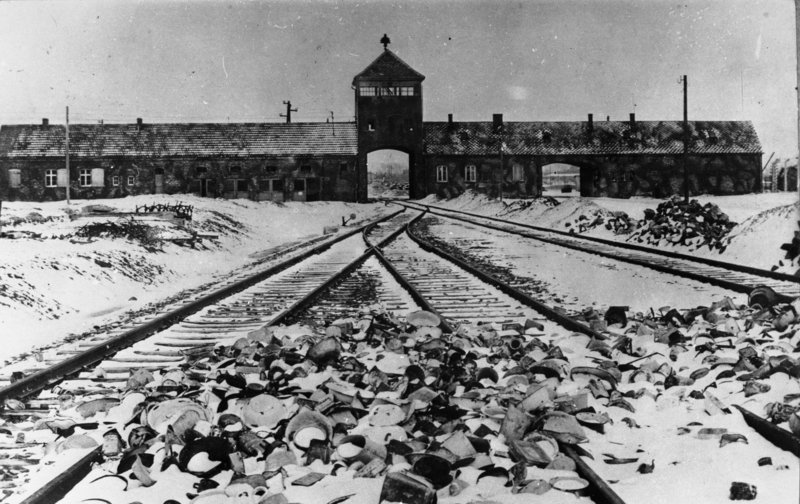
Railway tracks leading into the Auschwitz concentration camp

Yekusiel Yehuda (Zalmen Leib) Teitelbaum (1911 – 18 May 1944) was Chief Rabbi of Sighet/Máramarossziget from 1936–1940 (Romania), 1940–1944 (Hungary).

== Biography ==
Teitelbaum was the eldest son of Rabbi Chaim Tzvi Teitelbaum (Atzei Chaim – d. 1926) and a brother of Rabbi Moshe Teitelbaum. He was born in Máramarossziget, Hungary in 1911. At the age of 14 he was a successor to a long chain of Uhel-Sziget Rebbe's.

In his first marriage, he married Ruchel, daughter of his uncle Rabbi Joel Teitelbaum. Ruchel died after 18 months of marriage and Teitelbaum remarried Gitel Yehudis, the daughter of his other uncle Rabbi Zusha Halberstam son of Rabbi Shalom Eliezer Halberstam of Újfehértó (Ratzfert).

== The Holocaust ==
In May 1944, he was sent along with the first of four transports of the Jewish Community in Máramarossziget to the Auschwitz concentration camp where he was murdered in the early morning hours of May 18 in the gas chambers, together with his wife and his two children Chaim Tzvi and Ruchel.
