= Joel Teitelbaum =

Grand Rebbe of Satmar Hasidim

- יואל טייטלבוים
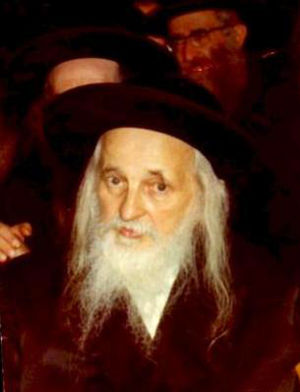

Personal life
- Born: January 13, 1887 Máramarossziget, Austria-Hungary (today Sighetu Marmației, Romania)
- Died: August 19, 1979 (aged 92) Mount Sinai Hospital, New York, U.S.
- Buried: Kiryas Joel Cemetery
- Parent: Chananyah Yom Tov Lipa Teitelbaum

Religious life
- Religion: Judaism

Jewish leader
- Other: Founder of the Satmar dynasty

Joel Teitelbaum (Yiddish: יואל טייטלבוים, romanized: Yoyel Teytlboym, IPA: [ˈjɔɪ.əl ˈtɛɪtl̩bɔɪm]; 13 January 1887 – 19 August 1979) was a Hungarian-born Romanian, later American Jewish leader, who was the founder and first Grand Rebbe of the Satmar dynasty. The Satmar Rebbe is also known as the Krula Rav.

A major figure in the post-war renaissance of Hasidism, he espoused a strictly conservative and isolationist line, rejecting modernity. Teitelbaum was a fierce opponent of Zionism, which he decried as inherently heretical on the basis of his own Orthodox Jewish interpretation of Jewish messianic prophecies and theology derived from the Talmud. The town of Kiryas Joel in New York is named in his honor.

== Biography ==
=== Early life ===
Teitelbaum was born on January 13, 1887. He was the second son of the Grand Rabbi of Sighet Chananyah Yom Tov Lipa Teitelbaum and his second wife, Chana Ashkenazi. The couple married in 1878, after receiving a special dispensation for him to take a second wife, as his first wife Reitze—daughter of Rebbe Menashe Rubin of Ropshitz—was unable to bear children. Joel was the youngest child; he had four older siblings.

The rabbis of the Teitelbaum family were known for their highly conservative stances and their opposition to the Enlightenment, Neolog Judaism, and Zionism. Chananyah was the great-grandson of Moshe Teitelbaum, a disciple of the Seer of Lublin, who was, in turn, one of the main promulgators of Hasidism in Hungary. He served as a rabbi in Técső. In 1883, after his father's death, Chananyah arrived in Máramarossziget (shortened to Siget in Yiddish; today Sighetu Marmației, Romania), where he began to serve as a rabbi. He became dean of the local rabbinical seminary and the leader of the eponymous Hasidic movement based in the city.

Joel was renowned for his intellectual capacities from a young age. At his bar mitzvah, he delivered a sermon of several hours concerning an issue from tractate Shabbat in the Talmud. He was stringent in matters regarding ritual purity and would lengthily prepare for prayer by meticulously cleaning himself.

Even before marrying, he received semikhah from eight prominent rabbis, including Moshe Greenwald. In 1904, just several days before his father's February 15 death, the 17-year-old married Chavah Horowitz, the daughter of Abraham Chaim Horowitz of Połaniec. They had three daughters, none of whom survived their father or had any children. The first, Esther, died in her youth on September 14, 1921; Rachel died on March 19, 1931, shortly after her wedding. The youngest, Chaya Roisa (or Reysel), died on October 23, 1953.

Teitelbaum's older brother, Chaim Tzvi Teitelbaum, succeeded their father in all three of his posts. Their mother and a small faction of the Hasidim regarded the younger brother (i.e. Joel) as the appropriate heir. The newly-wedded Joel and Chava then moved to her father's residence in Radomyśl Wielki and remained there for over a year.

On 8 September 1905, the Teitelbaums settled in Szatmárnémeti, or Satmar in Yiddish. Despite his youth, supporters opened a study hall for him. He gradually began to attract a local following. Journalist Dezső David Schön, who researched the Teitelbaum dynasty, wrote that Teitelbaum started to refer to himself as the "Rebbe of Satmar" around this point. Subsequently, he had tense relations with the first to claim the title: Yisaschar Dov Leifer, the son of Mordechai of Nadvorna. Leifer died on 12 September 1906.

=== Rabbinical career ===
In 1911, Teitelbaum was invited by the Jewish community in Ilosva (or Iršiva) to serve as their town's rabbi. Although then part of Austria-Hungary, the town is now Irshava, Ukraine. During Teitelbaum's residency, he established a local seminary and spread the ideas of Hasidism among the populace. Upon the outbreak of World War I, he returned to Satu Mare, where his former study hall gradually developed into a full-fledged seminary.

As a young rabbi, he clung to the positions of his father and grandfather. He forbade any contact with Zionists, including the Mizrachi (Religious Zionists), and supported Chaim Elazar Spira, the Rebbe of Munkacs, in his opposition to World Agudath Israel. When the Austro-Hungarian Empire was dissolved under the terms of the Treaty of Trianon (1920) following the war, Satu Mare, Partium, and Transylvania became part of the Kingdom of Romania.

The then-chief Orthodox rabbi of Satmar, Yehudah Greenwald, died on 9 March 1920. Several of Teitelbaum's supporters advanced his name as a possible candidate for the vacant office, but he was opposed by the non-Hasidic Ashkenazi majority, modernists, and Zionists in the community (not to mention by many other Hasidim). Eventually, Eliezer David Greenwald (no relation to the former) was chosen. In 1922, after eight years outside the town, Teitelbaum returned to his community, Iršiva, then in Czechoslovakia.

On 29 March 1925, he was appointed chief rabbi of Krula. He moved to the city about a year afterward. On 21 January 1926, his older brother, Chaim Tzvi, died unexpectedly of an intracranial hemorrhage. Tzvi's oldest son, Yekusiel Yehuda Teitelbaum (II), was just fourteen years old. Although many of his followers suggested Joel succeed his brother, the custom prevailed, and the boy was given his father's three posts. Yekusiel Judah Gross of Berbești was brought to serve as his tutor and de facto chief rabbi of Sighet.

Regardless, most of the Hasidim turned to Joel, who became the dynasty's rebbe in all but title. When he grew older, Yekusiel established a following of his own from among his father's loyal supporters, but his influence as rebbe never exceeded the city's limits.

On 20 May 1928, Eliezer David Greenwald of Satmar died, and Teitelbaum ran for the municipal rabbi's office again. An election committee established by the Orthodox community's board chose him for the post on June 11, with nineteen members in favor, five against, and two abstentions. After a prolonged dispute with his opponents, the parties decided to hold an election among all members of the congregation. It occurred on August 9, and Teitelbaum received 437 votes in favor and 331 against.

The opposition did not accept the results. On 27 September, 779 approved Teitelbaum in a second vote, and only one member rejected him. Chaim Freund, the community's president, and several other members of the board were close supporters of the rabbi, and his opponents accused them of rigging the vote throughout the election process by various means, including granting and withdrawing the right to participate according to criteria which benefited their candidate. Both sides sued their opponents in rabbinical courts and complained to the civilian authorities. The parties presented their claims in lengthy pamphlets printed in 1929: Freund's faction issued a book under the name Milkhemes Mitzve haKhudosh ("The New Commanded War"), and the other one published Sfas Emes ("Words of Truth").

Finally, following the continued refusal of many to accept Teitelbaum, his supporters established their own independent community on 10 December 1929, where he could serve as a rabbi. The fear of losing members' fees motivated the other party to negotiate. An agreement was reached on 11 June 1930, and Joel was invited to serve as Satmar's chief rabbi. He chose not to accept the nomination until he was certain of support from the community council, which took three and a half years. Only then did he move, arriving on 27 February 1934. With 334 students, his rabbinical seminary became Satmar's largest, having more pupils than the other three combined.

In August 1932, Teitelbaum visited Jerusalem. A small party there sought to appoint him as the Ashkenazi chief rabbi of the city in the wake of Yosef Chaim Sonnenfeld's death, but Yosef Tzvi Dushinsky eventually received the post. On 29 January 1936, Teitelbaum's first wife, Chava, died. On 20 August 1937, he remarried with Alte Faige Shapiro, the orphaned 25-year-old daughter of Avigdor Shapiro from Częstochowa, who was half his age.

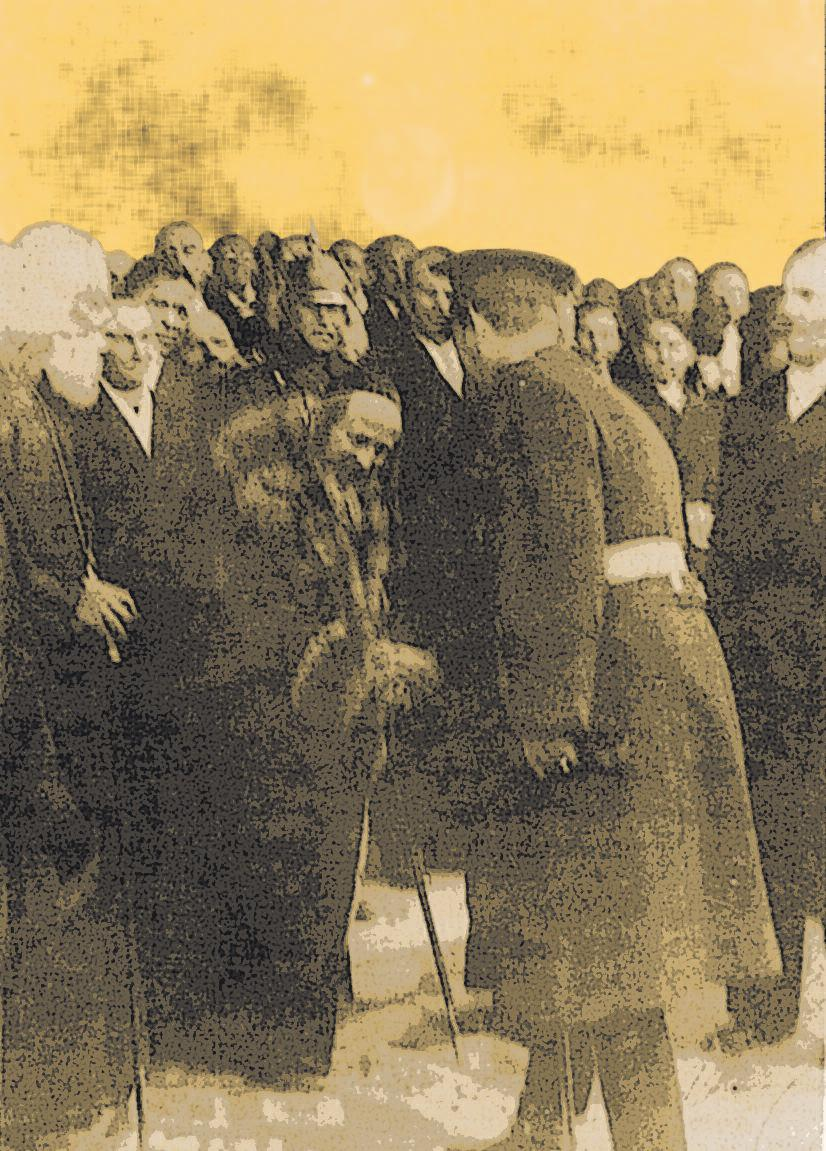
Rabbi Teitelbaum bowing to King Carol II of Romania, 1936

=== World War II ===
In 1940, following the Second Vienna Award, Satmar again became part of Hungary.

Prior to the Holocaust, Teitelbaum ignored the threats to the Jews of Transylvania and failed to engage in the preparation of rescue and aid plans. As the situation of Hungarian Jews became dangerous, Teitelbaum equipped himself and his closest circle with certificates or visas that would facilitate their escape to Mandatory Palestine or the United States. At the same time, he thwarted all attempts at cooperation between the heads of the ultra-Orthodox communities and the Zionist organizations, which could have helped the rest of the Jewish community to escape. His daughter settled in Jerusalem, while he called on his followers not to emigrate.

Teitelbaum's attempts to leave Hungary were part of a broader general phenomenon, which attracted criticism, even then, of rabbis and other public figures fleeing the country. When the Germans invaded Hungary, Teitelbaum's closest associates sought a safer way to smuggle him out by bribing two junior officers, drivers of a Red Cross ambulance, who agreed to drive a group of Jews to Kolozsvár (today Cluj-Napoca) in return for money. The travelers included his family and several wealthy families who paid most of the costs. The attempt failed, and Teitelbaum was arrested and sent to Kolozsvár Ghetto. Faced with harsh living conditions, he asked his followers to try to transfer him to Budapest or back to the ghetto of Satmar, where Jews were housed in residential buildings, but they were unable to fulfill his requests. Baron Fülöp von Freudiger, director of the Orthodox congregation in Budapest, selected eighty rabbis and other prominent figures and paid for their inclusion in the passengers' list of the Kastner train, which was to depart the state for a neutral country. Teitelbaum put himself on the list even though a Zionist group organized the evacuation.

On 30 June 1944, once negotiations with the Germans had been concluded, the passengers boarded a freight train that was planned to proceed to Switzerland but was eventually diverted to Bergen Belsen. The group was held in a special section, in better conditions than those of other groups. Although the group included several notable figures, Teitelbaum was given special consideration. The group's physician exempted him from roll calls, and volunteers performed the tasks imposed on him.

With the help of Kasztner and SS officer Herman Krumey, the final arrangements were made, and Teitelbaum was transferred to Switzerland with some Jews from the group. Upon his arrival in Switzerland, he was accorded preferential treatment by the authorities.

Eventually, he decided to immigrate to Mandatory Palestine. In August 1945, several hundreds of the Kastner train's passengers, Teitelbaum among them, left Switzerland for the port of Taranto in Italy. On the 30th, they boarded the ship Ville d'Oran, which arrived in Haifa on the morning of 2 September. Teitelbaum resided in Jerusalem at the house of his nephew and son-in-law, Lipa Meir Teitelbaum.

When Joel Teitelbaum's institutions became bankrupt after a year, he emigrated to the United States.

=== United States ===
The Satmar Rebbe arrived in New York on the second day of Rosh HaShana (27 September) 1946, aboard the motor vessel Vulcania. He settled in Williamsburg, Brooklyn, with a small group of supporters.

In late April 1948, the Satmar Hasidim established "Congregation Yetev Lev", named after his grandfather, which was registered as a religious corporation. The community's regulations, accepted in April 1952, decreed that Teitelbaum was not a salaried officeholder but the supreme spiritual authority over the members.

In 1951, although not a resident of Israel, Teitelbaum was appointed to the ceremonial office of President of the anti-Zionist Edah HaChareidis (Congregation of God-Fearers) in Jerusalem. After the death of Zelig Reuven Bengis on 21 May 1953, he also succeeded him as the Chief Rabbi and Grand Patriarch of Edah HaChareidis Rabbinical Court. He visited Israel twice, in the summers of 1956 and 1965.

In 1955, Teitelbaum founded the Central Rabbinical Congress, which he headed for the remainder of his life. From the early 1960s, Teitelbaum's envoys sought to establish a rural settlement where the congregants could be secluded from the outside world. They eventually managed to purchase territory in Monroe, New York, where they built Kiryas Joel (Town of Joel). The first families settled there in 1974.

On 23 February 1968, Teitelbaum suffered a stroke, which left him partially paralyzed and barely functioning. His wife, backed by several sextons and other functionaries, became the behind-the-scenes power in Satmar. In the early hours of 19 August 1979, he complained of aches and was transported to Mount Sinai Hospital, where he suffered a myocardial infarction and died at approximately 8 am. Over 100,000 people attended his funeral in Kiryas Joel. He was succeeded by his nephew, Moshe Teitelbaum, the second son of his older brother.

== Opinions ==
=== Opposition to Zionism ===
Teitelbaum was well known for his spoken and written opposition to Zionism. He encouraged his followers living in Israel to form self-sufficient communities without assistance from the State of Israel and forbade any official engagement with it.

In Teitelbaum's view, the founding of the State of Israel by secular and religious Jews, rather than the Messiah, violated a Jewish commandment that Jews should wait for the Messiah. Moreover, Teitelbaum taught that the existence of the State of Israel was actually preventing the Messiah from coming.

==== Three oaths ====
The core citations from classical Judaic sources cited by Teitelbaum in his arguments against Zionism are based on a passage in the Talmud. Rabbi Jose bar Hanina explains in Ketubot 111a that God imposed "three oaths" on the nation of Israel: a) Israel should not return to the Land together by using force; b) Israel should not rebel against the nations (i.e., non-Jewish peoples); and c) the nations (i.e., non-Jews) should not subjugate Israel "too harshly."

Teitelbaum argues that the second oath relates to the wars between Israel and neighboring Arab countries. He views the establishment of the State of Israel as an act of "impatience," echoing the Talmud's warning about the dangers of seeking God's love with impatience. The Satmar Hasidim posit that the frequent wars the State of Israel is in are a result of ignoring this oath.

Teitelbaum saw his opposition to Zionism as a way of protecting Jews and preventing bloodshed. Apart from his opposition to the founding and existence of Israel as being violations of the Three Oaths and his opposition to Zionism as an idolatrous replacement of or addition to rabbinic Judaism, Teitelbaum held that participating in the Israeli government – especially voting in the elections – was prohibited. To do so, in his opinion, would make one a "partner" in all of the state's "anti-Torah" policies and contribute to the spiritual and physical destruction of innocent people. Although many Haredi rabbis are non-Zionist, the general view of Agudat Yisrael and other Haredi rabbis opposed to secular Jewish sovereignty in the State of Israel is that participating in the Israeli government is permitted. Teitelbaum, however, was openly opposed to the views of Agudath Israel, and, until the present time, Satmar Hasidim refused to become members of the organization. The Satmar view is that only the Moshiach can bring about a Jewish government in the Land of Israel. Even if a government declaring itself religious would be formed before the arrival of the Moshiach, it would be illegitimate due to its "improper arrogation of power."

Although the Satmar Hasidim are opposed to the present government of Israel, many of them live in and visit Israel. Teitelbaum resided in Jerusalem for roughly one year after escaping from Europe and before the establishment of the State of Israel. He also visited Israel after moving to the United States.

=== Other opinions ===
Teitelbaum was very stringent in many particulars of Jewish law. He argued with Moshe Feinstein over the proper height of a mechitza (the partition between the sexes in the synagogue). Feinstein held that the mechitza needed to go only up to the shoulders of the average woman; Teitelbaum opined that the mechitza should not allow women to be seen at all.

Teitelbaum was strongly opposed to the use of a tube for metzitzah during circumcision of a baby boy and felt that this change in the procedure would spiritually lead to more promiscuity.

Teitelbaum encouraged all married Hasidic men to wear ceremonial fur hats. Although most Hasidic men in Hungary did not wear these before the war, Teitelbaum felt that in America, it was more important for people to look very different from the rest of the population to prevent assimilation, which was more rampant in America than in Hungary. He held that young men and women should not meet more than two or three times before getting engaged.

Teitelbaum stressed the importance of tznius. He was a strong proponent of the Hungarian Hasidic custom for married women to shave their heads every month before immersion in the mikveh (ritual bath). He recommended against wearing wigs by married women as he felt that the halakha prohibited this. Instead, Teitelbaum wanted women to cover their hair with something else, such as a turban. He insisted that all Satmar women and girls wear thick brown stockings with seams. The stockings had to be at least 90 deniers long. Due to the lack of such stockings, Teitelbaum encouraged one of his followers to manufacture the stockings. The stockings are called palm – the English translation of Teitelbaum's last name.

Teitelbaum prohibited the ownership of a television. This was in the 1950s when TV was still heavily censored for promiscuous content. He bought and oversaw his own Yiddish-language newspaper, Der Yid, for two reasons: First, he felt that the other Yiddish newspapers at the time contained articles that were prohibited from reading because of their promiscuous content and lack of respect for Haredi leaders. Additionally, Teitelbaum wanted a platform from which to spread his ideas.

== Works ==
Some of the works Teitelbaum authored himself, or otherwise compiled by students:

- Vayoel Moshe (1958), explaining his belief that Zionism is prohibited by halakha (Jewish law)
- Al HaGeulah VeAl HaTemurah (1967, with N. Y. Meisels), further explaining his belief that Zionism is prohibited, in light of the Six-Day War
- Divrei Yoel, on the Chumash, Talmud, and Jewish festivals
- Kuntres Chidushai Torah, on the Chumash
- Kuntres Chidushai Torah, on the festivals
- Shu"t Divrei Yoel, responsa on halakha
- Dibros Kodesh, sermons given at shalosh Seudos
- Agados Maharit, on the Talmud
- Tiv Levav, on the Chumash
- Rav Tuv, on the Chumash

Teitelbaum authored a brief introduction to the Talmudic tractate Shabbat for a Holocaust-era printing in Romania. There are collections of his speeches entitled Hidushei Torah MHR"I Teitelbaum.

== See also ==
- Hasidic Judaism
