= Yetev Lev =

Yetev Lev may refer to:

- Yekusiel Yehuda Teitelbaum (I), known as the Yetev Lev
- Congregation Yetev Lev D'Satmar (Hooper Street, Brooklyn)
- Congregation Yetev Lev D'Satmar (Rodney Street, Brooklyn)

== See also ==
- Congregation Yetev Lev D'Satmar (disambiguation)
