= Yiddish orthography =

Writing of the Yiddish language

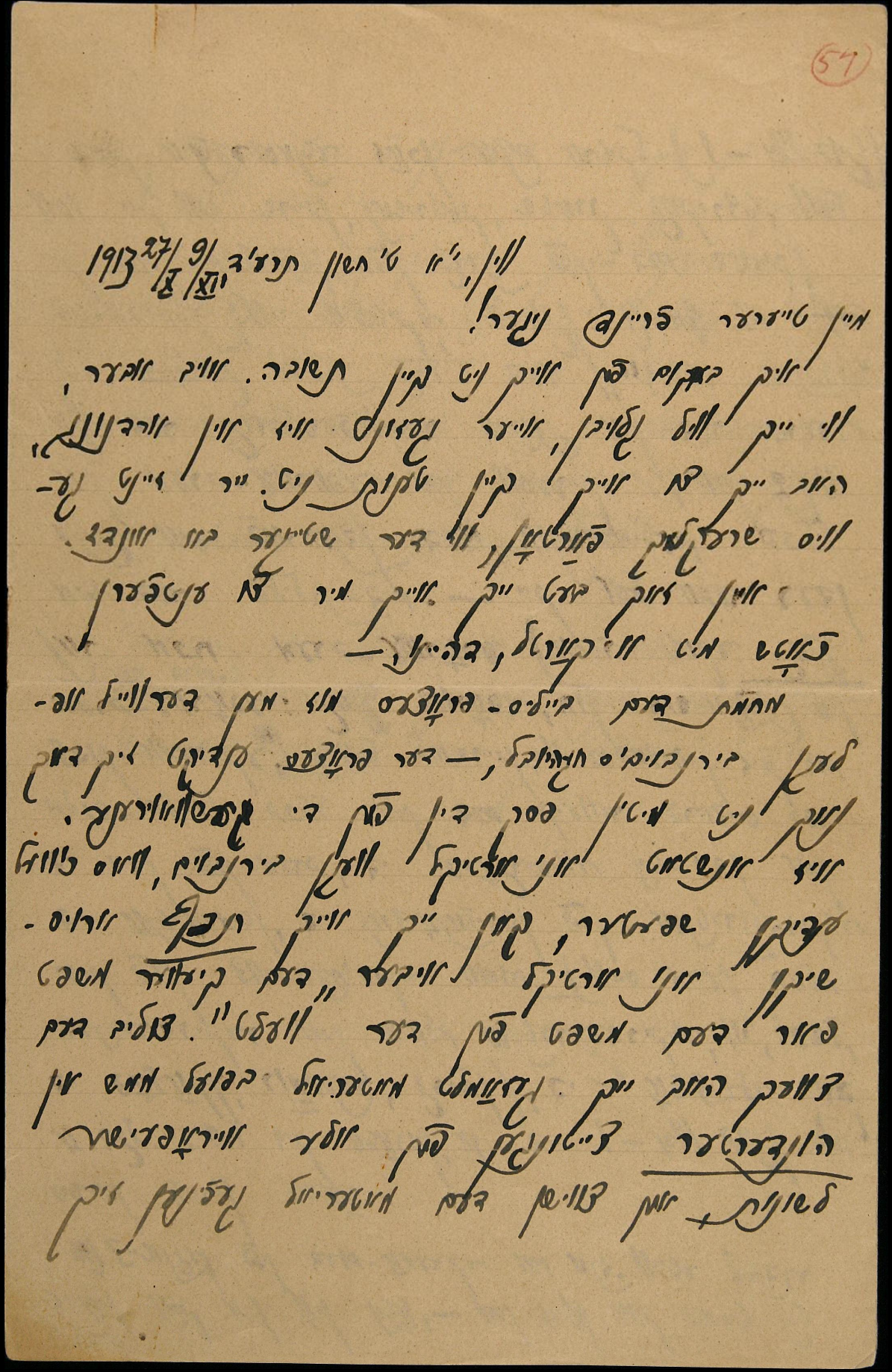
Letter from Ber Borochov to Shmuel Niger 1913, a sample of Yiddish handwriting.

Yiddish orthography is the writing system used for the Yiddish language. Yiddish is written with the Hebrew script, whose letters are used as the basis of a full vocalic alphabet (unlike the abjad system used for the Hebrew language). Over its history, the spelling rules that govern Yiddish orthography have evolved and been subject to several reforms and standardisations, especially in the 20th century. Nonetheless, there remains variation between different ways of writing Yiddish in the present day.

In Yiddish orthography, letters that are silent or that represent glottal stops in Hebrew are used to represent Yiddish vowels. There are letters that can serve as both vowels and consonants, which are either read based on context or are differentiated by diacritical marks. These diacritics are derived from Hebrew nikkud and are commonly referred to as "nekudot" or "pintalach" (literally 'points', as they are mostly point-like signs). Additional phonetic distinctions between letters that share the same base character are also indicated by either pointing or adjacent placement of otherwise silent base characters. Several Yiddish points are not commonly used in any latter-day Hebrew context; others are used in a manner that is specific to Yiddish orthography. There is significant variation in the way this is applied in literary practice. There are also several differing approaches to the disambiguation of characters that can be used as either vowels or consonants.

Words of Aramaic and Hebrew origin are normally written in the traditional orthography of the source language—i.e., the orthography of these words, which is consonant-based, is generally preserved. All other Yiddish words are represented with phonemic orthography. Both forms can appear in a single word—for example, where a Yiddish affix is applied to a Hebrew stem. Yiddish diacritics may also be applied to words that are otherwise written entirely with traditional orthography.

== Reform and standardization ==
Traditional orthography

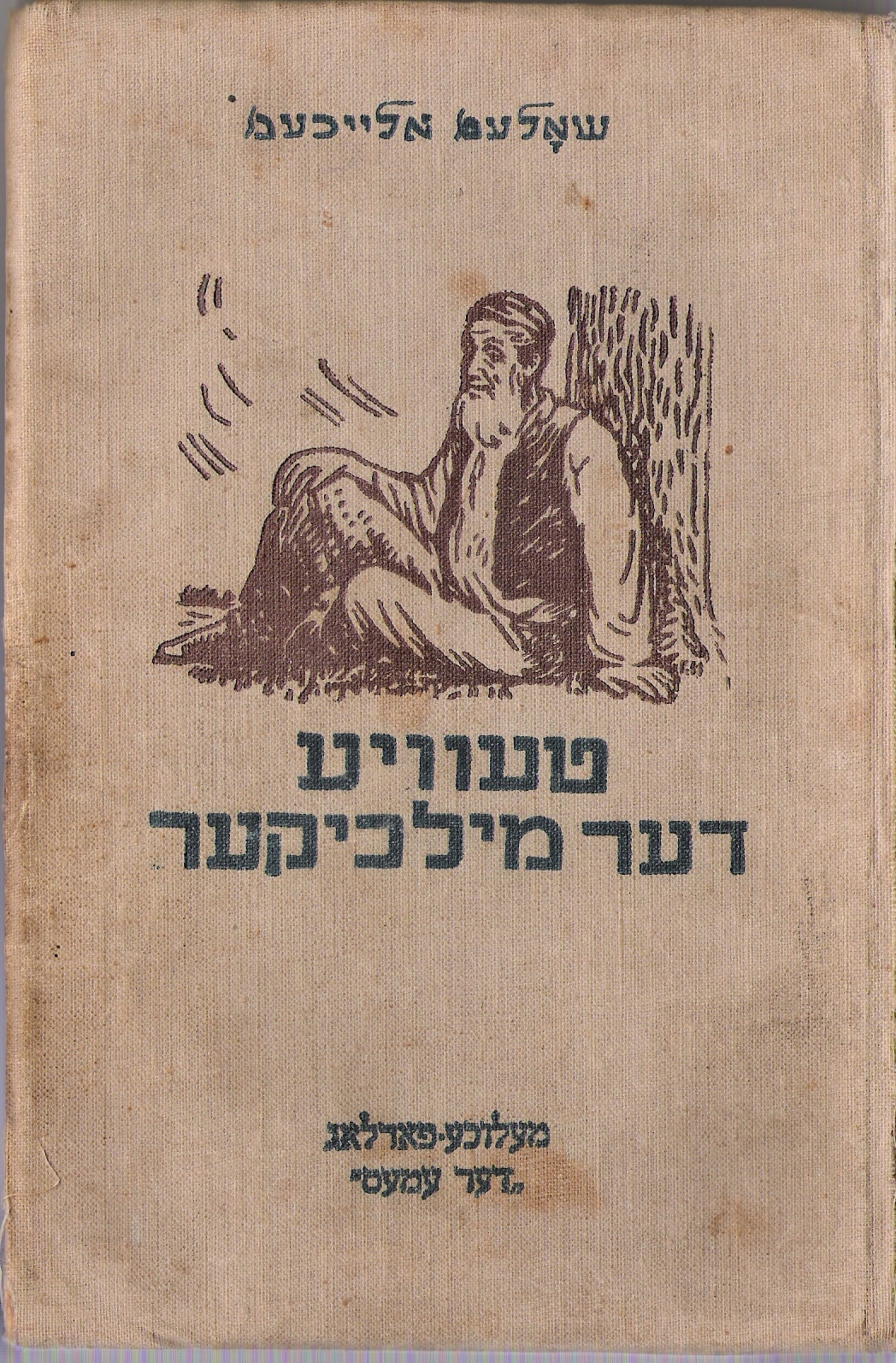
Soviet orthography

In the early 20th century, for cultural and political reasons, efforts were initiated toward the development of a uniform Yiddish orthography. A specimen initial practice was described in detail by the Yiddish lexicographer Alexander Harkavy in a Treatise on Yiddish Reading, Orthography, and Dialectal Variations first published in 1898 together with his Yiddish–English Dictionary. Additional illustrations of this variation are provided in source excerpts in Fishman 1981, which also contains a number of texts specifically about the need (pro and con) for a uniform orthography. A detailed chronology of the major events during this normative action, including rosters of conference participants, bibliographic references to the documents they produced, and summaries of their contents, is given in Yiddish in Schaechter 1999. There is a less detailed (but extensive nonetheless) English language review of this process in Estraikh 1999.

The first action formally undertaken by a government was in the Soviet Union in 1920, abolishing the separate etymological orthography for words of Semitic (i.e., Hebrew and Aramaic) origin. Under this reform, Hebrew words were respelled according to their Yiddish pronunciation rather than their etymological spelling. The reform also eliminated German-inspired orthographic conventions such as silent "hej" and "ajen" letters and redundant gemination of consonants.

A more comprehensive reform was developed in 1928 and finalized in 1932. It abolished the five special word-final allographs for the consonants [f], [x], [m], [n], and [ts], which had been a distinctive feature of the Hebrew-based Yiddish writing system; this change was widely reintroduced in 1961. Additional changes included: elimination of the silent aleph in word-medial positions; differentiating between the prefixes "af" and "uf"; changing the spelling of "ba" for prefixes and prepositions; eliminating doubled consonants at morphological seams; and adopting a Russified spelling of international terms and proper names. The most radical proposals involved the Latinization of Yiddish, which had precedents in pre-revolutionary plans like Ludwig Zamenhof's 1909 blueprint. During the Soviet period, Latinization gained momentum between 1930 and 1933, coinciding with a broader campaign to Latinize writing systems of multiple Soviet languages. Nojekh Shulman published an article supporting a universal Roman alphabet in 1919, while in 1930 Moyshe Kamenshteyn advocated for Latinization in the pedagogical magazine Ratnbildung. Isaac Zaretzki initially opposed to Latinization, became one of its strongest proponents by 1930, arguing that the Roman alphabet was more international, ideologically closer to Communism, and would make it easier to eliminate Hebrew words from Yiddish. Proposals included a 26-letter Roman alphabet (V. Kolchinski) and a 28-letter version (Bentsion Grande). Though some songbooks were published using a Latin-based "Czech transcription" for musical notation, the Latinization initiative was ultimately shelved by 1934, when it began to be mentioned negatively in official publications.

The changes are both illustrated in the way the name of the author Sholem Aleichem is written. His own work uses the form שלום־עליכם but in Soviet publication this is respelled phonetically to שאָלעמ־אלײכעמ also dispensing with the separate final-form mem and using the initial/medial form instead. This can be seen, together with a respelling of the name of the protagonist of his Tevye der milkhiker, by comparing the title pages of that work in the U.S. and Soviet editions illustrated next to this paragraph. The Germanized מילכיגער (milkhiger) in the former exemplifies another widespread trend, daytshmerish, discussed further below.

The efforts preliminary to the 1920 reform, which took place in several countries—most notably in Poland with focus on a uniform school curriculum—resulted in other devices that were not implemented as a result of any governmental mandate. These were further considered during the 1930s by the Yidisher visnshaftlekher institut, YIVO. This led to the development of their Takones fun yidishn oysleyg (תּקנות פֿון ייִדישן אויסלייג; lit. 'Rules of Yiddish Orthography'), also known as the "SYO" (Standard Yiddish Orthography) or the "YIVO Rules" (1st edition YIVO 1935, current edition SYO 1999). This has become the most frequently referenced such system in present-day use. Although it regularly figures in pedagogical contexts, it would be misleading to suggest that it is similarly dominant elsewhere. Other orthographies are frequently encountered in contemporary practice and are house standards for many publishers.

A useful review of this variation is provided in the Oxford University Klal-takones fun yidishn oysleyg (כלל־תקנות פון יידישן אויסלייג; lit. 'Standard Rules of Yiddish Orthography'), written in and codifying a more conventional orthography than the one put forward by YIVO. Differences in the systems can be seen simply by comparing the titles of the two documents but they differ more fundamentally in their approaches to the prescription and description of orthographic detail. The former treats orthographic variation as a positive attribute of the Yiddish literature and describes essential elements of that variation. The latter presents a uniform Yiddish orthography, based on observed practice but with proactive prescriptive intent. Strong difference of opinion about the relative merit of the two approaches has been a prominent aspect of the discussion from the outset and shows little sign of abating. Although the Yiddish alphabet as stated in the SYO is widely accepted as a baseline reference (with a few minor but frequently encountered variations), the spelling and phonetics of the YIVO system of romanized transliteration discussed below, remain subjects of particular contention. The intent of the SYO is not to describe the spectrum of traditional orthographic practice. The bulk of Yiddish literature predates the formulation of those rules and the discrepancies are significant.

== Transliteration ==
A few Yiddish letters and letter combinations are pronounced quite differently in the various Yiddish dialects. Whatever impact this may have on the discussion of standardized orthography, it becomes a significant factor when Yiddish is transliterated into other scripts. It is entirely possible to assign a specific character or sequence of characters in, for example, the Latin alphabet to a specific character or character sequence in the Yiddish alphabet. The transliterated form will, however, be pronounced in a manner that appears natural to the reader. A choice therefore needs to be made about which of the several possible pronunciations of the Yiddish word is to be conveyed prior to its transliteration, with parallel attention to the phonemic attributes of the target language.

The romanization of Yiddish has been a focus of scholarly attention in Europe since the early 16th century. A detailed review of the various systems presented through the 17th century, including extensive source excerpts, is provided in Frakes 2007. The Harkavy treatise cited above describes a late 19th-century system that is based on the pronunciation of the Northeastern Yiddish dialect, Litvish, for an anglophone audience. This was also a mainstay of the standardization efforts of YIVO, resulting in the romanization system described in detail below. The Harkavy and YIVO initiatives provide a convenient framework within which intervening developments may be considered. There was significant debate about many aspects of that sequence, including the need for any form of standardized orthography at all.

The outright replacement of Hebrew script with Roman script in the native representation of written Yiddish was briefly considered, among others by L. L. Zamenhof. This had no impact on mainstream orthography but a number of Yiddish books are currently available in romanized editions. These include Yiddish dictionaries, a context in which consistent and phonetically tenable transliteration is essential.

There is no general agreement regarding transliteration of Hebrew into the Roman alphabet. The Hebrew component of a Yiddish text will normally reflect the transliterator's preference without being seen as a component of the methodology applied to the romanization of words presented in the phonemic orthography.

== Transcription ==
A transliteration system uses one script to represent another as closely as possible. It normally permits unambiguous conversion between the two scripts. Where the intent is to indicate phonetic variation, some form of transcription (frequently done through usage of the International Phonetic Alphabet) will be required. There are also many contexts in which phonetic distinctions are indicated by the diacritical marking of the base characters, or through the similar use of some alternate script that is familiar to the intended audience. These approaches are all also seen in native Yiddish texts, where distinctions that cannot be directly represented with the basic Yiddish script but do need to be highlighted, are indicated by using additional Hebrew diacritical marks, with Roman letters, or with the IPA.

There is no intrinsic reason why a transcription scheme cannot also be used for transliteration. In general, however, there is no expectation that the representation of a word in the source script can be retrieved from a transcription. Its purpose is to indicate how a word is pronounced, not its native orthography.

The table in the following section indicates two alternatives each for romanized transliteration and phonetic transcription, and is keyed to the Yiddish character repertoire as codified by YIVO. Other transliteration systems are also regularly employed in a variety of contexts, but none represent the full range of variant pronunciation in Yiddish dialects. Nor is the YIVO system equally appropriate phonetically to all languages using Roman script. This issue becomes particularly complex when dealing with older texts where little is known about contemporaneous pronunciation; transmitting the fullest possible detail of their notation is historically important. There are several approaches to the romanization of such material. The YIVO transliteration system is solely intended to serve as an English-oriented phonetic counterpart to the modern Standard Yiddish described (and to some extent prescribed) in the SYO. That work does, however, consider the transcription of variant pronunciation as will be discussed below.

YIVO published a major study of the range of Yiddish phonetic variation in The Language and Cultural Atlas of Ashkenazic Jewry, commonly referred to as the LCAAJ. This uses a detailed system of marked Roman characters and suprasegmental marks to indicate that variation, and does not apply standard YIVO transliteration at all. Although the full phonetic transcription scheme is not amenable to presentation in the table below, its core elements have been included. This scheme has been used by later authors to indicate "phonetic transcription", and is labeled in that manner below. One recent example of this is provided in Jacobs 2005. Another transcription system frequently cited in academic contexts was devised and presented (in German) by Solomon Birnbaum in Birnbaum 1918 and was used in his later German works, as well as his English publication Birnbaum 1979. This was intended to provide extreme flexibility in the representation of differences between dialects but failed to gain further practical acceptance due to its intricacy and idiosyncratic appearance:

Illustration with a passage from Sholem Aleichem's Shprintse
Birnbaum	YIVO transliteration
Vaaihii haaiym, tréft zex a maasy, éiryv Śvjjys iz dus gyvéin, kjm ex cj fuurn mit a bisl milexiks cj ainy fjn maany koinytys, a ijngy almuuny jn a raaxy fjn Iékaterinoslav, vus is gykjmyn cj fuurn mit ir ziindl, Aronćik haist er, kain Boiberik ifn zjmer	Vayehi hayoym, treft zikh a mayse, erev-Shvues iz dos geven, kum ikh tsu forn mit a bisel milkhigs tsu eyner fun mayne kundes, a yunge almone un a raykhe fun Katerineslav, vos iz gekumen tsu forn mit ihr zundl, Arontshik heyst er, keyn Boyberik oyfn zumer

== Yiddish alphabet ==
This table lists the Yiddish alphabet as described in Uriel Weinreich's English–Yiddish–English Dictionary, with a few variants that may be seen in readily available literature. The YIVO romanizations are taken from the same source, where they are presented as "sound equivalents". The romanizations indicated in Harkavy 1898 are included for comparison. The IPA transcriptions correspond to the examples provided by YIVO (with a few additional variants). The transcriptions in the following column were extrapolated from the LCAAJ. The Dutch transliteration system was taken from the Jiddisch–Nederlands Woordenboek. The elements of the two transcription systems appear in this table as appropriate to the standard pronunciation discussed under the next heading. The same elements, particularly those indicating vowels and diphthongs, are associated with other Yiddish letters when other pronunciations are being transcribed.

The table also includes several digraphs and a trigraph that are standard elements of the Yiddish writing system. They appear here in normal alphabetic order but are commonly collated separately at the end of a listing of the basic single-character alphabet.

The pronunciation in contemporary Hasidic communities reflects the regional dialects from which these communities originate, and therefore may differ from the standard presented below.

Symbol	Pronunciation	Transcription			Letter equivalent		Name	Notes
Symbol	IPA	YIVO	Harkavy	LCAAJ	German	Dutch	Name	Notes
א	(none)						shtumer alef	(Note: Indicates that a syllable starts with the vocalic form of the following letter. Neither pronounced nor transcribed. Also used for pasekh alef and komets alef, in which case it is simply called "alef.")
אַ	a						pasekh alef	(Note: As a non-YIVO equivalent, an [a] or an [o] may also be indicated by an unmarked alef.)
אָ	ɔ	o					komets alef	
ב	b						beys	
בּ	b	(none)		(b)	b	b	beys	Non-YIVO alternative to ב
בֿ	v				w	v	veys	(Note: Only used in words of Semitic origin)
ג	ɡ						giml	
ד	d						daled	
דזש	d͡ʒ	dzh	(none)	dž	dsch	dzj	daled zayen shin	
ה	h						hey	
ו	ʊ	u				oe	vov	
וּ	ʊ	u	(none)	u		oe	melupm vov	(Note: Only used adjacent to ו or before י)
וֹ	ɔ, ɔj	(none)		(o, oj)	o, oj, eu, äu	–	khoylem	Non-YIVO alternative to אָ and וי
וו	v				w		tsvey vovn	
וי	ɔj	oy	oi	oj	oj, eu, äu	oi, oj	vov yud	
ז	z				s	z	zayen	
זש	ʒ	zh		ž	j, sch	zj	zayen shin	
ח	x	kh	ch	x	ch		khes	
ט	t						tes	
טש	t͡ʃ	tsh		č	tsch	tsj	tes shin	
י	j, i	y, i		j, i		i, ie	yud	(Note: Consonantal [j] when the first character in a syllable. Vocalic [i] otherwise.)
יִ	i		(none)	i			khirik yud	(Note: Only used following a consonantal י or adjacent to another vowel)
יי	ɛj	ey	ei, ai	ej		eej	tsvey yudn	
ײַ	aj	ay	(none)	aj	ei, ai, aj	ai, aj	pasekh tsvey yudn	
כּ	k						kof	
כ	x		kh	ch			khof	
ך	x		kh	ch			lange/ende khof	(Note: Final form, only used at the end of a word)
ל	l, ʎ	l					lamed	
מ	m						mem	
ם	m						shlos/ende mem	
נ	n						nun	
ן	n, ŋ, m	n, m				n	lange/ende nun	
ס	s				ss, ß	s	samekh	
ע	ɛ, ə	e					ayin	
פּ	p						pey	Also used as a final form
פֿ	f						fey	
פ	f	(none)	f	(f)	f	–	fey	Non-YIVO alternative to פֿ
ף	f						lange/ende fey	
צ	t͡s	ts	tz	c	z	ts	tsadek	
ץ	t͡s	ts	tz	c	z	ts	lange/ende tsadik	
ק	k						kuf, (Hasidic) keef	
ר	ʀ, r, ɾ	r		r			reysh	
ש	ʃ	sh		š	sch	sj	shin	
שׂ	s				ss, ß	s	sin	
תּ	t						tof	
ת	s				ss, ß	s	sof	

== Standard Yiddish Orthography ==
The SYO is presented in Yiddish, and a few romanized transcriptions are included only where needed to indicate variant pronunciation. Given that the YIVO standardization initiative has been severely criticized for failing to accommodate such variation, it may be worth noting that the SYO explicitly references the three major branches of Eastern Yiddish—Litvish (Northern), Poylish (Central), and Ukrainish (Southern), as developed in the regions centered on present-day Lithuania/Belarus, Poland, and Ukraine/Moldova. The SYO gives dialect-specific romanized equivalents for the following characters:

Symbol	Litvish	Poylish	Ukrainish	Name
ו	u	i	i	vov
יי	ej	aj	ej	tsvey yudn
ײַ	aj	ā	aj	pasekh tsvey yudn

A few further romanized equivalents are provided but do not indicate dialectal differences. These are identical to what is contained in the table in the preceding section, with the following exceptions:

Symbol	Romanization	Name	Note
כ	ch, x, [kh]	khof	kh is not included in earlier SYO editions
ש	š	shin	

YIVO took Litvish as the standard dialect with only slight modification, to a large extent because of the consistency with which its phonemic attributes could be represented by a standardized orthography similarly requiring only minimal elaboration of traditional practice. The important distinctions between Litvish, Poylish, and Ukrainish are therefore not indicated in either the SYO or Weinreich dictionary. These are, however, discussed in detail in the LCAAJ to which Uriel Weinreich was a major contributor. The Roman characters appearing in the SYO correspond to those used in the LCAAJ, and their marking according to Central European orthographic convention provides greater flexibility in notating dialectal distinction than does an English-oriented approach. Phonetic transcription is therefore common in linguistic discourse about Yiddish, often using a wide range of diacritical marks in clear contrast to the totally undecorated YIVO romanization.

The SYO listing of the Yiddish alphabet (which predates the Weinreich dictionary) explicitly states that the vowels with combining points, and the vov and yud digraphs, are not counted as separate letters, nor are the additional consonant digraphs and trigraphs listed at all:

דער סדר פֿון אותיות אין אַלף־בית איז אַזאַ׃ א, ב, בֿ, ג, ד, ה, ו, ז, ח, ט, י, כּ, כ (ך), ל, מ (ם), נ (ן), ס, ע, פּ, פֿ (ף), צ (ץ), ק, ר, ש, שׂ, תּ, ת
אַ, אָ, וּ, וו, וי, יִ, יי, ײַ רעכענען זיך ניט פֿאַר קײן באַזונדערע אותיות אין אַלף־בית

The order of the letters in the alphabet is as follows, from right to left:

א, ב, בֿ, ג, ד, ה, ו, ז, ח, ט, י, כּ, כ, (ך), ל, מ, (ם), נ, (ן), ס, ע, פּ, פֿ, (ף), צ, (ץ), ק, ר, ש, שׂ, תּ, ת

These are not counted as separate letters of the alphabet:

אַ, אָ, וּ, וו, וי, יִ, יי, ײַ

== Common variation ==
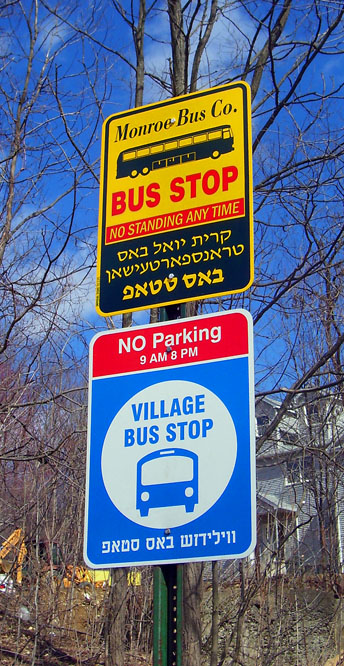
Transliteration in Yiddish alphabet of English text on bus stop signs in Kiryas Joel, New York. This is completely unpointed; for example stop is written סטאפ rather than סטאָפּ

There are several areas in which Yiddish orthographic practice varies. One of them is the extent to which pointing is used to avoid ambiguity in the way a word may be read. This ranges from unpointed text, through a small number of pointed characters, to the redundant use of the full system of Hebraic vowel pointing. Text being prepared for print generally uses a certain amount of pointing. In other contexts, however, there is an increasing tendency to forgo it entirely.

The most frugal application of pointing is the distinction of pey and fey by enclosing a dot in the former (further details below). Immediately beyond that is the differentiation of the komets alef from the unpointed form and then the further use of the pasekh alef. Where additional points are applied, there can be significant variation in their number and disposition and there are often internal inconsistencies in a single system. (The belief that this variation was an impediment to the recognition of Yiddish as a literary peer to the other major European languages was a primary driving force toward the development of orthographic norms.)

A detailed generalized description of the pointing of Yiddish text is given in Harkavy 1898 and the topic is also treated briefly in the SYO (which otherwise simply declares the prescribed characters). A more extensive character repertoire is presented and discussed in Birnbaum 1918.

Although consonants are basically represented in the same manner, the indication of vowels differs more widely. One noteworthy situation that does pertain to the representation of consonants is the indication of phonetic distinctions between each of the four character pairs beys/veys, kof/khof, pey/fey, and tof/sof. The 'hard' (plosive) pronunciation of the first letter in each pair is unequivocally denoted by a dot (dagesh) in the middle of the letter. The 'soft' (fricative) pronunciation is similarly notated with a horizontal bar over the letter (rafe). Most orthographic systems usually only point one of the two characters in a pair but may be inconsistent from pair to pair in indicating the hard or soft alternative. Text that otherwise conforms to the SYO therefore frequently omits the rafe from fey, in harmonization with its unpointed final form, and makes the contrastive distinction from a pey solely with a dagesh in the latter (פ פּ). The similar avoidance of the rafe and preferential use of the dagesh is a common alternative for the contrastive distinction between beys and veys (ב בּ), although in Yiddish, because beys is used much more than veys, with veys limited to words of Semitic origin, the dagesh is avoided and rafe used instead.

The rafe is an attribute of earlier Yiddish orthographic tradition and the dagesh is an adaptation of what is more generally a Hebrew practice. This also applies to the alternatives for indicating the distinction between yud when used as a consonant or as a vowel. There is a related need for marking the boundary between a yud and tsvey yudn where they appear adjacent to each other and, again, in the corresponding situation with vov and tsvey vovn. A dot under a yud (khirik yud) and to the left of a vov (melupm vov) unambiguously indicates the vocalic form of those letters. Harkavy does not use these pointed forms in the main table above, being among the details codified in the early 20th century. In the traditional Yiddish orthographies where these letters are not pointed, the vowel is indicated by preceding it with a shtumer alef (reducing the use of which was a major focus of the normative efforts). The single and digraph forms of, for example, vov can be separated either with a dot or an embedded alef as וווּ or וואו (vu, 'where'). Although only the former spelling is consistent with the SYO and appears in Uriel Weinreich's dictionary, he uses the unpointed alternative exclusively in his own Say it in Yiddish (ISBN 0-486-20815-X), a phrase book that contains the word in a large number of "Where is...?" queries and was published when the rules had already been well established.

A further graphic example of this distinction is seen in the official announcement, on 14 November 1997, of a change in editorial policy for the prominent Yiddish periodical, פֿאָרווערטס (Forverts, Yiddish Forward). It was first during that year that they adopted the YIVO orthography. The previous editorial position overtly opposed any such change and the following is included in the explanation of the shift (quoted in full in Schaechter 1999, p. 109):

און דערנאָך האָבן מיר באַזײַטיקט דעם אלף אין די ווערטער ייד און יידיש (פֿריער איד און אידיש), ייִנגל (פֿריער אינגל); און איצט וועלן די ווערטער געשריבן ווערן מיט אַ חיריק אונטערן צווייטן יוד, װי׃ ייִד, ייִדיש, ייִנגל

And then we removed the alef in the words ייד [yid] and יידיש [yidish] (previously איד and אידיש) and ייִנגל [yingl] (previously אינגל), and now will spell the words with a khirik under the second yud as: ייִדיש, ייִד and ייִנגל.

The appearance of three alternate spellings for the name of the Yiddish language in a statement intended to describe its orthographic standardization might not require any comment if it were not for the clear indication that the cardinal representation—יידיש—was neither the older nor the newer editorial preference. Regardless of the intent of that statement, a word-initial yud is consonantal and an adjacent yud is vocalic in all Yiddish orthographic systems, as is the constraint on a word initial tsvey yudn diphthong. Pointing the second yud in ייִדיש is therefore, indeed, redundant. The spelling אידיש also illustrates some of the dialectal breadth of the Yiddish language, the name of which is both written and pronounced with and without an initial consonant. In earlier texts, a single vov in word-initial position was often used to indicate /f/ (a reflex of the German use of v to denote /f/).

Finally, letters other than shtumer alef may be used as silent indications of syllable boundaries and in compound consonants, as well as for extending the length of an adjacent vowel. This became particularly common in deliberately Germanized orthographies dating from the late 19th century, collectively termed daytshmerish. Its most obvious further attributes are the heavy use of double consonants where traditional orthography uses single ones, and the gratuitous substitution of German vocabulary for established Yiddish words. The desire to reverse that trend was another of the reasons for the effort toward orthographic standardization.

Publishers of Yiddish newspapers have, however, been particularly conservative in their attitude toward that development and the preceding editorial statement in Forverts provides a useful capsule summary of the details about which opinions differed. Other current Yiddish newspapers and magazines retain the spelling אידיש and many elements of daytshmerish. This is typified in דער איד (Der Yid), which is one of several weekly tabloids—others being דער בּלאט (Der Blatt) and די צייטונג (di tsaytung, News Report)—that all adhere to the earlier orthography and are in wider circulation and of substantially greater length than the broadsheet Forverts. It may also be seen in the online version of the אַלגעמיינער זשורנאַל (algemeyner zhurnal – Algemeiner Journal), as well as in its printed edition. Extensive additional source material relevant to the stance of the daily press on orthographic reform is provided in Fishman 1981.

Editorial acceptance of varying orthographies is a general characteristic of Hasidic publication, and a single work written by multiple authors may differ in that regard from section to section depending on the preferences of the individual contributors or the typographic context. One example of the latter situation is the use of the pointed forms of alef only in specific instances where they are deemed necessary to avoid misreading. (As may be noted with the preceding discussion of the spelling of ייִדיש, and the pointing of both fey and pey, the SYO contains some redundant elements.) The online manifestation of such orthographic heterogeneity can readily be seen in the Yiddish Wikipedia. This is an expansive aspect of contemporary Yiddish publication and will require detailed accommodation in future codifications of orthographic practice.

== Graphic innovation ==
Orthographic reform, as considered here, embraces two distinct actions. The first is concerned with the way Yiddish words are spelled, as illustrated in the preceding section with the name of the language itself. The second relates to the graphic devices used to distinguish, for example, between א when representing what in English is an /a/ and when representing an /o/. The pointed אַ and אָ came into use for that purpose in the mid-18th century and were thus well established by the time the 20th century reforms were initiated, as were several other traditional Yiddish pointings. The most deeply entrenched of these was the distinction between פ fey and פּ pey. YIVO proposed the additional use of pointed letters that were not in the Yiddish (or Hebrew) fonts of the day. This is a frequently cited reason for the SYO being slow to gain acceptance, but regardless of any opinion about their utility, most of the graphic elements introduced in that manner are now readily available. (The SYO explicitly states that pointing to disambiguate vowels does not change the identity of the base character; a pointed alef, for example, is not a letter of its own.)

The first edition of the SYO was preceded by a collection of essays published by YIVO in 1930 entitled, "A Standard of Yiddish Spelling; Discussion No. 1" (דער איינהייטלעכער יידישער אויסלייג—der eynheytlekher yidisher oysleyg). Neither the title of this work, nor its contents, were written using the conventions that YIVO was subsequently to put forward on its basis. The pivotal essay in the 1930 collection was written by Max Weinreich. His, "A Projected Uniform Yiddish Orthography", was not written with the pointing that was to be prescribed in the SYO and introduces a character that was entirely absent from the previous repertoire. This is the V-shaped grapheme on the second line of that text, replacing the tsvey vovn in Weinreich's name, and in the name of the city where the work was published, Vilna. It appears at numerous additional places in the text and in two other essays in the same collection but did not appear in any subsequent printed work. It was, however, included in the SYO as a recommendation for use in handwritten text, where it is also encountered. Yudl Mark, who authored one of the other 1930 essays in which the typeset form was used, was later to dub this character the shpitsik maksl ("acute Maxy"), and it remains enshrined in the YIVO logo.

Further orthographic variation is seen in other YIVO publications from the same period, also using markings that were not included in the SYO, but which did have typographic precedent (for example, אֵ to represent /e/). The way in which the pasekh tsvey yudn are set in the heading of the Weinreich article (in his name) is discussed below.

== Computerized text production ==
There are orthographic alternatives in the digital representation of Yiddish text that may not be visually apparent but are of crucial importance to computer applications that compare two sequences of characters to determine if they match exactly. Examples of this are database queries and spell checkers. Situations where differing representations of typographically similar characters can give unexpected or incorrect results are described below. This may prove a particular concern for Internet users as Yiddish is increasingly used in Internationalized Domain Names, and in Web and e-mail addresses.

Some mobile clients only provide limited support for typing pointed text, restricting the range of available characters for such things as instant messaging and other forms of spontaneous digital text. Even people who are skilled in using laptop or desktop keyboards for that purpose (which also requires some erudition) are subject to this constraint. This fuels the move toward unpointed text and is illustrated in the blog, Yiddish with an alef. This is of particular note given the late acceptance of the SYO by its parent publication, The Jewish Daily Forward, discussed below.

=== Digraphs ===
There are two different ways in which each of the digraphs tsvey vovn, vov yud, and tsvey yudn can be typed on Yiddish and Hebrew keyboards (which are both commonly used for the production of Yiddish text). If the digraph appears on a single key, as is normal in a Yiddish keyboard layout, pressing that key will produce a single-character ligature. In the Unicode code chart the HEBREW LIGATURE YIDDISH DOUBLE VAV appears in position U+05F0, the HEBREW LIGATURE YIDDISH VAV YOD at U+05F1, and the HEBREW LIGATURE YIDDISH DOUBLE YOD at U+05F2 (where the U+ indicates that the numerical position of the character in the Unicode chart is given by following four hexadecimal digits).

These ligatures are, however, frequently missing from Hebrew keyboards—a characteristic inherited from the similarly differentiated Yiddish and Hebrew typewriter layouts. A separate vov yud was, however, not provided on either. Hebrew typewriters were modified specifically for Yiddish by the replacement of the first two keys in the second row, which were used for punctuation marks, with one shifting key for "tsvey yudn/tsvey vovn" and another for "komets alef/pey" (with dagesh). This can be seen on a typewriter that belonged to the Yiddish author Isaac Bashevis Singer. Typewriters built directly for Yiddish include the same four additional characters in different positions, as can be seen on another typewriter that belonged to Singer . The salient difference between the two designs is that each key on the Yiddish typewriter produces one character only, available in two different sizes through shifting.

As a result of the widespread practice of writing Yiddish on Hebrew keyboards and other legacy effects of the variant digraph forms on both modified Hebrew and native Yiddish typewriters, when Yiddish text is entered from a computer keyboard with single-key digraphs, many people nonetheless type the digraphs as two-key combinations, giving the corresponding two-letter sequences (tsvey vovn U+05D5 U+05D5; vov yud U+05D5 U+05D9; tsvey yudn U+05D9 U+05D9). Although ligatures can be appropriate in monospaced typewritten text, other than in the smallest type sizes they rarely appear in proportional typesetting, where the elements of a digraph are normally letterspaced as individual characters (illustrated in Max Weinreich's name in the facsimile text in the preceding section). It may be of further interest to note that a useful, albeit highly colloquial, test of whether digraphs are regarded as single or double characters is provided by the way they appear in crossword puzzles. In Yiddish, each element of a digraph is written in its own square (and the same practice applies to other word games where letters are allocated to positions of fixed width in a regular array).

The pointed digraph pasekh tsvey yudn can also be typed in different ways. The one is simply to enter a precomposed pasekh tsvey yudn, which is both displayed and stored as a single character ײַ (U+FB1F). The second option is to enter the tsvey yudn ligature as a base character and then to enter a combining pasekh for display together with it. Although appearing to be a single character ײַ, it is stored digitally as two separate characters (U+05F2 U+05B7). These two forms can only be directly entered from a keyboard on which the ligature appears. As a result, a practice is developing where pasekh tsvey yudn are indicated by enclosing a pasekh between the elements of a two-character digraph. The pasekh aligns correctly only with the first yud (subject to conditions described in the next section) but the display is tolerably that of a fully marked digraph יַי and in some display environments may be indistinguishable from one or both of the previous alternatives. However, this option requires the storage of three separate characters (U+05D9 U+05B7 U+05D9). As a fourth alternative, albeit the least stable typographically, the second of two consecutive yudn may be pointed ייַ (U+05D9 U+05D9 U+05B7). A pasekh yud is otherwise not part of any established Yiddish character repertoire, and its use in this context manifests conditions that are specific to computerized typography. The four possible representations of the pasekh tsvey yudn thus have even greater potential for causing confusion than do the other digraphs. A further potentially confusing option specific to computerized text production, but not a component of any Yiddish orthographic tradition, is the combination of a khirik with a tsvey yudn ligature to represent the consonant–vowel sequence yud—khirik yud, as ײִ (U+05F2 U+05B4) rather than the correct ייִ (U+05D9 U+05D9 U+05B4).

=== Combining marks ===
Fonts that support Hebrew script do not always correctly render the combining points that are specific to Yiddish (and in many cases have general difficulty with Hebrew marks). Some applications display extraneous blank space adjacent to a letter with such a mark, and the mark may be displayed in that space rather than properly positioned with the base character. Writing text for presentation in a reading environment that has unknown font resources—as will almost invariably be the case with HTML documents—thus needs special care. Here again, this is not simply a matter of typographic preference. The disjunction of combining and base characters can easily lead to error when character sequences are copied from one application into another.

The same alternative modes of entry that are illustrated above with the pasekh tsvey yudn are available for all of the other pointed characters used in Yiddish, with largely indistinguishable visual results but with differing internal representations. Any such character that appears on either a physical or a virtual keyboard will normally be recorded as a two-character sequence consisting of the base character followed by the combining mark. If a graphic character selector is used that does not emulate a keyboard, the desired character will be chosen from a table on the basis of its appearance. Since such facilities display combining marks separately from base characters, it is likely that the precomposed character form of a character will be the more readily recognized of the alternatives.

Most applications will accept either form of input, but frequently normalize it to the combining characters. There are, however, some applications that normalize all input to precomposed characters. Digital texts containing the combining, and the precomposed alternatives are therefore both encountered. An example of extensive text using precomposed characters is provided by the online edition of the periodical לעבּנס־פֿראַגן (lebns-fragn, Life Questions).

The present article was written using combining characters with the exception of the second row in the following table, which is provided to illustrate the differences between the two forms. In a viewing environment prone to the misalignment of base characters with their combining marks, precomposed characters are more likely to be typographically stable (but may cause greater difficulty in other regards).

Combining	אַ	אָ	בּ	בֿ	וּ	וֹ	יִ	ײַ	כּ	פּ	פֿ	שׂ	תּ
Precomposed	אַ	אָ	בּ	בֿ	וּ	וֹ	יִ	ײַ	כּ	פּ	פֿ	שׂ	תּ

=== Punctuation ===
The punctuation marks used to indicate sentence structure—the comma, period, colon, and semicolon—are the same in Yiddish as they are in English. The punctuation used for the abbreviation, contraction, and concatenation of words—the apostrophe and hyphen—are conceptually similar but typographically distinct in a manner that, yet again, can cause confusion when represented digitally. This can be illustrated with the contraction for עס איז (es iz, 'it is'), which is ס׳איז (s'iz, 'it's'). Although the Yiddish punctuation mark is termed an אַפּאָסטראָף (apostrof) the character used to represent it is the Hebrew geresh, which differs both in its graphic appearance and, more importantly, in its digital representation. (The APOSTROPHE is U+0027, and the HEBREW PUNCTUATION GERESH is U+05F3.) What is termed a double apostrophe is used to indicate abbreviation through the removal of several consecutive letters. For example, דאָקטאָר (doktor, 'doctor') is abbreviated ד״ר (equivalent to Dr.). The punctuation mark is, however, not the QUOTATION MARK (U+0022), but the HEBREW PUNCTUATION GERSHAYIM (U+05F4), which is the dual form of the word geresh.

Yiddish words are also hyphenated in a manner that is directly comparable to English punctuation. The character used to indicate it is, however, not the HYPHEN-MINUS (U+002D), but the HEBREW PUNCTUATION MAQAF (U+05BE). The latter character appears as the horizontal mark flush with the top of the text in מאַמע־לשון (mame-loshn, 'mother tongue'; the common vernacular designation for the Yiddish language). Typeset text may also indicate hyphenation with a character resembling an equal sign (⸗), sometimes in an oblique variant, but this is uncommon in digital text.

The distinctions between geresh – gershayim – maqaf and "apostrophe – quotation mark – hyphen" are always indicated correctly in typeset material (with exception for the occasional deliberate use of the hyphen instead of the maqaf). All characters in the first group are, however, not directly available on many Hebrew or Yiddish keyboards, and any that is lacking is commonly replaced by the corresponding character in the second group. Here again, in situations that depend on the correct matching of character sequences, the fall-back representation of a punctuation mark may not match the stored target of a database query, without the reason for the failure being apparent to a non-specialist user.

Paired characters such as parentheses, brackets, and quotation marks, which are typographically mirrored—( ) [ ] { } “ ”—are prone to incorrect presentation in digital Yiddish text, with the opening and closing forms appearing to have exchanged places. (There are several instances in the preceding text where this problem will be apparent on systems that do not properly render mirroring characters in bidirectional text.)

== See also ==
- Yiddish dialects
- Yiddish phonology
- Hebrew punctuation

== Sources ==
- Birnbaum, Salomo A., Praktische Grammatik der Jiddischen Sprache für den Selbstunterricht, Hartleben Verlag, Vienna, 1918, (in German), 5th ed., Grammatik der Jiddischen Sprache, mit einem Wörterbuch und Lesestücken, Buske Verlag, Hamburg, 1988, ISBN 3-87118-874-3.
- Birnbaum, Solomon A., Yiddish: A Survey and a Grammar, University of Toronto Press, Toronto, 1979, ISBN 0-8020-5382-3.
- Estraikh, Gennady, Soviet Yiddish: Language Planning and Linguistic Development, Clarendon Press, Oxford, 1999, ISBN 0-19-818479-4.
- Fishman, Joshua A. (ed.), Never Say Die: A Thousand Years of Yiddish in Jewish Life and Letters, Mouton Publishers, The Hague, 1981, (in English and Yiddish), ISBN 90-279-7978-2.
- Frakes, Jerold C., The Cultural Study of Yiddish in Early Modern Europe, Palgrave Macmillan, New York, 2007, ISBN 1-4039-7547-7.
- Frakes, Jerold C., Early Yiddish Texts 1100–1750, Oxford University Press, Oxford, 2004, ISBN 0-19-926614-X.
- Frank, Herman, Jewish Typography and Bookmaking Art, Hebrew-American Typographical Union, New York, 1938.
- Harkavy, Alexander, Harkavy's English-Jewish and Jewish-English Dictionary, Hebrew Publishing Company, New York, 1898. Expanded 6th ed., 1910. scanned facsimile
- Harkavy, Alexander, Yiddish-English-Hebrew Dictionary, Hebrew Publishing Company, New York, 1925. Expanded 2nd ed., 1928, reprinted, Yale University Press, 2005, ISBN 0-300-10839-7.
- Herzog, Marvin, et al. (ed.), YIVO, The Language and Culture Atlas of Ashkenazic Jewry, 3 vols., Max Niemeyer Verlag, Tübingen, 1992–2000, ISBN 3-484-73013-7.
- Jacobs, Neil G., Yiddish: A Linguistic Introduction, Cambridge University Press, Cambridge, 2005, ISBN 0-521-77215-X.
- Katz, Dovid, Grammar of the Yiddish Language, Duckworth, London, 1987, ISBN 0-7156-2161-0. scanned facsimile
- Katz, Dovid (compiler), Code of Yiddish Spelling, Oxforder Yidish Press, Oxford, 1992, (in Yiddish), ISBN 1-897744-01-3. scanned facsimile
- Niborski, Yitskhok, Verterbukh fun loshn-koydesh-stamike verter in yidish, 3rd ed., Bibliothèque Medem, Paris, 2012, ISBN 979-10-91238-00-7.
- Schaechter, Mordkhe, The Standardized Yiddish Orthography: Rules of Yiddish Spelling, 6th ed., and The History of the Standardized Yiddish Spelling, YIVO Institute for Jewish Research, New York, 1999, (in Yiddish with introductory material in English), ISBN 0-914512-25-0.
- Weinreich, Max, Proyektn fun an aynheytlekher yidishen oysleyg, in Der aynhaytlekher Yidisher oysleyg: materialn un proyektn tsu der ortografisher konferents fun YIVO, ershte zamlung, Yidisher Visnshaftlekher Institut, Vilna, 1930. pp. 20–65 scanned facsimile
- Weinreich, Uriel, Modern Yiddish-English English-Yiddish Dictionary, YIVO Institute for Jewish Research, New York, 1968, ISBN 0-8052-0575-6.
- Weinreich, Uriel, College Yiddish: an Introduction to the Yiddish language and to Jewish Life and Culture, 6th revised ed., YIVO Institute for Jewish Research, New York, 1999, ISBN 0-914512-26-9.
- Yardeni, Ada, The Book of Hebrew Script, The British Library, London, 2002, ISBN 1-58456-087-8.
- YIVO, Der aynhaytlekher Yidisher oysleyg: materialn un proyektn tsu der ortografisher konferents fun YIVO, ershte zamlung, Yidisher Visnshaftlekher Institut, Vilna, 1930. scanned facsimile
- YIVO, Oysleyg-takones fun Yidish, Yidisher Visnshaftlekher Institut, Vilna, 1935. scanned facsimile
