= Der Blatt =

Weekly Yiddish newspaper

- Type: Weekly newspaper
- Format: Tabloid
- Owner: Elimelech Deutch
- Founded: 2000; 26 years ago
- Language: Yiddish
- Headquarters: Williamsburg, Brooklyn, New York, United States
- Circulation: 8000
- Website: derblatt.com

Der Blatt (Yiddish: דער בּלאַט, lit. "The Page" or "The Newspaper") is a weekly Yiddish newspaper published in New York City by Satmar Hasidic supporters of Rabbi Aaron Teitelbaum.

== History ==
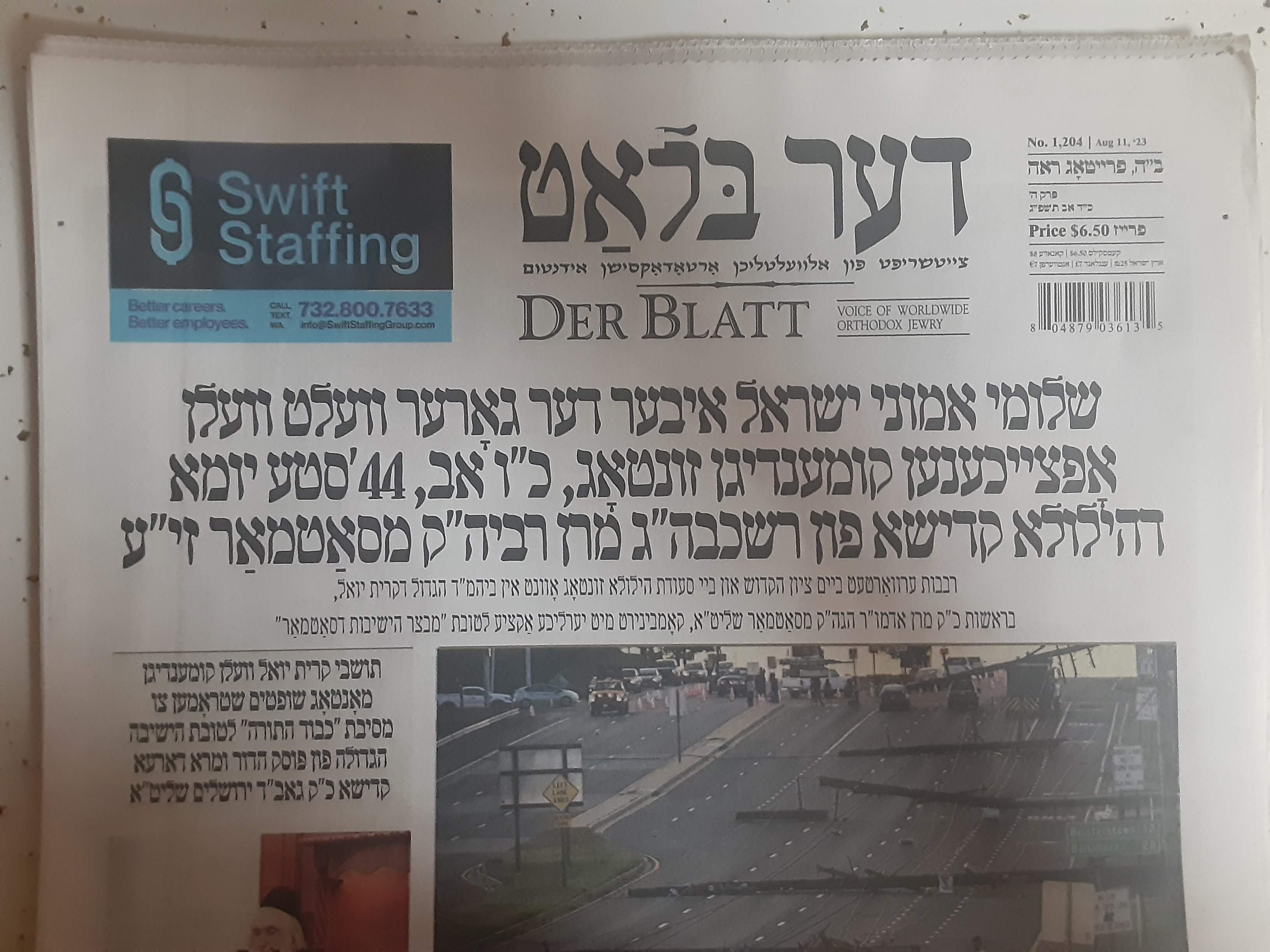
2023 issue of Der Blatt

Der Blatt was established in 2000, as a direct result of the Satmar succession feud. Prior to that time, there was only one Satmar newspaper, Der Yid. In the dispute over the succession, Der Yid came under the control of the supporters of Zalman Teitelbaum. This left rival supporters of his brother, Aaron Teitelbaum, without a platform for communication and public relations, prompting them to establish a newspaper of their own. The resulting publication promotes Aaron, rather than Zalman, as the legitimate successor of the previous rebbe, Moshe Teitelbaum. The publication adheres to a strict interpretation of tzniut that prohibits photographs of women on its pages. Der Blatt follows Satmar's anti-Zionist stance. Der Yid and Der Blatt function "more or less as official state organs" for Zalman and Aaron Teitelbaum respectively.

In November 2020, Der Blatt broke the news of the wedding of Rabbi Aaron Teitelbaum's grandson, which was held during the COVID-19 pandemic.

== See also ==
- Der Yid
- Di Tzeitung
- Hamodia
- Kindline
- The Jewish Press
