= Der Yid =

Yiddish New York newspaper

- Cover of Der Yid (2017), with the headline story reporting on a demonstration against Israel's compulsory military draft
- Type: Weekly newspaper
- Founded: 1953
- Language: Yiddish
- Headquarters: Brooklyn, New York
- Country: United States
- Circulation: 55,000 (as of 2019)
- Website: www.deryid.org

Der Yid (Yiddish: דער איד, lit. 'The Jew') is a nonprofit New York–based Yiddish-language weekly newspaper, founded in 1953. The newspaper is published by Der Yid Inc, a 501(c)(3) nonprofit. It is widely read within the broader Yiddish-speaking Haredi community. It uses a Yiddish dialect common to Satmar Hasidim, as opposed to "YIVO Yiddish", which is standard in secular and academic circles.

== History ==
1960 front page of Der Yid announcing the capture of Adolf Eichmann

Der Yid was founded in 1953 by Aaron Rosmarin as a fortnightly paper. He had previously been an editor of the Yiddish newspaper Der Morgn-Zhurnal ("The Morning Journal") where the religiously observant Rosmarin had run columns on the biographies of rabbis and Jewish customs. Rosmarin was laid off when the paper was bought out in 1953 by a rival Yiddish newspaper, Der Tog ("The Day"), forming the Tog-Morgn-Zhurnal ("The Day-Morning Journal"). At that point, Rosmarin decided to start his own newspaper, and Der Yid was born.

Under his influence, Der Yid was considered more sympathetic to Haredi Judaism than the other major Yiddish newspapers of the time. The first editor of Der Yid was the writer Uriel Zimmer, who was an anti-Zionist.

Rosmarin eventually sold Der Yid to activist leaders of the Satmar community, including Sender Deutsch, who became editor-in-chief. Deutsch was the newspaper's publisher for 19 years until he started publishing the Yiddish daily Yiddische Zeitung in 1971.

Joel Teitelbaum, the rebbe of Satmar, became the paper's guiding voice, firmly establishing Der Yid as a Haredi and anti-Zionist newspaper. He once approved an appeal for financial contributions to the newspaper on the night of Yom Kippur, as a counterweight to pro-Zionist financial appeals that were commonly held on that day.

In 1972, the paper was revamped by Chaim Moshe Stauber as a weekly newspaper carrying world news.

In the late 2010s, Der Yid had a circulation of between 55,000 and 80,000.

=== Today ===
Der Yid is owned by the supporters of Satmar Rabbi Zalman Teitelbaum, the dynasty's Williamsburg, Brooklyn faction, which is based at the community's central Congregation Yetev Lev D'Satmar on Rodney Street, Brooklyn. The editor-in-chief is Aron Friedman, who has been with the newspaper for over 40 years.

The paper remains firmly anti-Zionist, although some changes have occurred over time. For instance, when the State of Israel is mentioned, it no longer appears in mocking quotation marks. Der Yid refrains from publishing photographs of women in its pages, in keeping with Hasidic standards of tzniut. The newspaper also publishes a daily edition, which, according to its website, has 15,000 e-mail subscribers.

The community of Aaron Teitelbaum, Zalman's older brother, publishes a similar Yiddish newspaper, Der Blatt.

== See also ==
- Der Blatt
- Di Tzeitung
- Hamodia
- Kindline
