= Di Tzeitung =

Yiddish newspaper

- די זעלבסטשטענדיגע אידישע צייטונג (The Independent Yiddish Newspaper)
- Type: Weekly Newspaper
- Format: Paper
- Owner: Abraham Friedman
- Founded: 1988; 38 years ago
- Language: Yiddish
- Headquarters: Brooklyn, NY
- Website: http://ditzeitung.com

Di Tzeitung (Yiddish: די צייטונג; the newspaper) is a Yiddish weekly newspaper published in New York City, founded in 1988 and edited by Abraham Friedman, a Satmar Hasidic Jew, from Borough Park, Brooklyn, New York.

It is published weekly, on Wednesdays. and sold throughout New York, especially in Williamsburg and Borough Park, two prominent Yiddish-speaking neighborhoods in Brooklyn.

The newspaper's mission is to bring news to readers with a non-partisan outlook. Although the editor belongs to the Satmar community and advocates their methods, they do not interfere in its internal disputes. The newspaper's editors identify with a liberal worldview, and tend to the Democratic Party more than other Yiddish newspapers.

== History ==
The first edition was published on Parshat Acharei Kedoshim 5748 (1988), under the name Nayes Baricht or News Report (in English). For the first three weeks, they asked customers to offer good names for the new paper, and the winner would receive a lifetime subscription. The winning entry was its current name, Di Tzeitung.

== Controversy ==
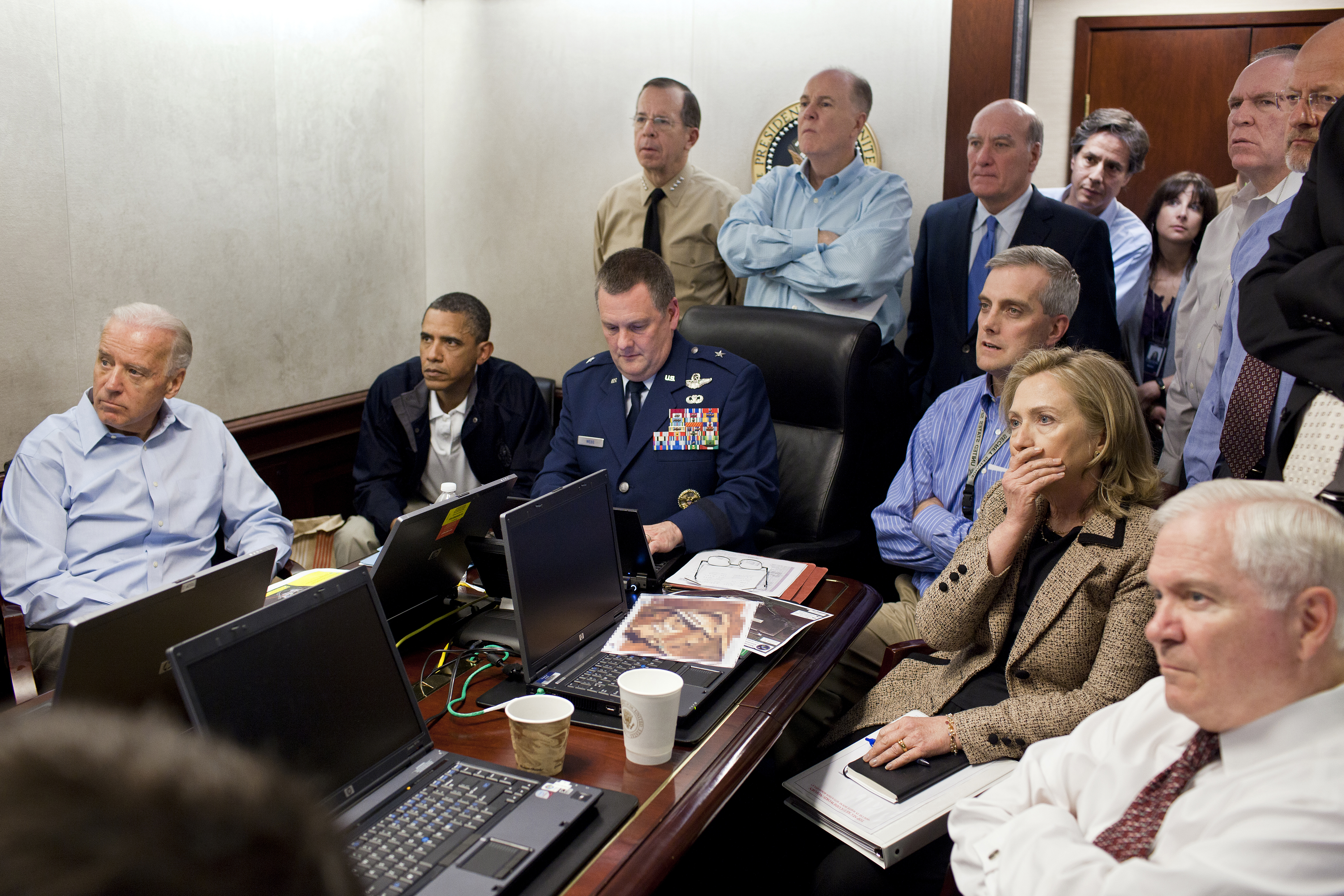
The original photo by The White House

The newspaper with the censored photo

In 2011, the newspaper was involved in a controversy when it digitally removed Secretary of State Hillary Clinton and Director for Counterterrorism for the NSC Audrey Tomason from the Situation Room, the iconic photo showing President Obama and his security team watching the raid on Osama bin Laden's compound on May 2, 2011. This was due to its policy of not running photographs with women because of modesty rules.

The newspaper subsequently apologized for altering the image in breach of the terms of its release, and explained that the editor who made the change had not seen the White House conditions for publication, which stipulated that the photo "may not be manipulated in any way". The newspaper said it has a "long-standing editorial policy" of not publishing women's images. The statement said that while Clinton has served "with great distinction", the newspaper does not publish images of women, as that is not "in accord with our religious beliefs".

The Washington Post subsequently issued a correction, noting that Di Tzeitung had not violated any White House copyright because the photograph was "in the public domain from the moment of inception". In addition, Dee Voch (The Week), a weekly Hasidic magazine from Brooklyn, also edited out the women.

The editing of images of women out of photographs is a common practice of Haredi newspapers. While some interpreted this practice as a result of inequality to women's rights in Hasidic Judaism.

== See also ==
- Der Blatt
- Der Yid
- Hamodia
- Kindline
