= Yiddish Wikipedia =

Yiddish-language edition of Wikipedia

- Website type: Internet encyclopedia project
- Available in: Yiddish
- Headquarters: Miami, Florida
- Owner: Wikimedia Foundation
- Website: yi.wikipedia.org
- Commercial: No
- Registration: Optional
- Launched: 3 March 2004; 22 years ago
- Content license: Creative Commons Attribution/ Share-Alike 4.0 (most text also dual-licensed under GFDL); Media licensing varies

The Yiddish Wikipedia (Yiddish: יידיש-וויקיפעדיע) is the Yiddish-language version of Wikipedia. It was founded on 3 March 2004, and the first article was written on 28 November of that year.

== Current status ==
The Yiddish Wikipedia has 15,815 articles as of September 2026. There are 62,091 registered users (including bots); 49 are active, including 3 administrators.

In accordance with the norms for the Yiddish language, it is written exclusively in Hebrew script with different Yiddish orthography including YIVO, Hasidic Yiddish and Daytshmerish.

In 2007, conflict among editors on the site, especially between editors who were mostly active on the Hebrew Wikipedia site, led to the proposed closure of the Yiddish Wikipedia. While the closure did not take place, continuing conflict between editors continue due to opposing interests of group members regarding shared and interrelated doctrines about Jewishness.

== Milestones ==
The Yiddish Wikipedia reached 6,000 articles on 8 March 2009. The 6,000th article is יהושע העשיל תאומים-פרענקל, a rabbi. The 7,000th article is חנינא סגן הכהנים, an article about the Hanina Segan ha-Kohanim created on 24 December 2009.

== Point of view ==
Combined, the different Hasidic groups form the largest Yiddish-speaking community in the world today. Therefore, many new articles are about Hasidic rabbis.

Other examples of the Yiddish Wikipedia's extensive coverage on Orthodox Judaism in general, and Hasidic Judaism in particular, are:

- the Yiddish Wikipedia's Main Page's covers Jewish topics extensively. Generally, at the top of the Main Page of any language Wikipedia is a list of links to portals or categories of general topics, for examples the arts, history, mathematics, and science. However, on the Yiddish Wikipedia Main Page, in addition to the usual links, there are links to the all-Jewish categories of Judaism, Hasidism, Sifrei Kodesh (sacred books of Jewish religious literature), the Holocaust, and rabbis.
- the Yiddish Wikipedia's page about user pages lists the rules a user must follow when making his user page. As a suggestion, the article says a user should not write untrue things about themselves on their user page, for example "if you live in Williamsburg, it's not proper to write that you live in Lakewood." The two places mentioned in the example, Williamsburg and Lakewood, are home to very large and influential Orthodox Jewish communities.
- on the Yiddish page for What Wikipedia is not, one of the sections is named "Wikipedia is not a mikveh". The name is based on the idea that Jews who find themselves together in the mikveh (Jewish ritual bath) share with each other the latest news and rumors. This section tries to convey that short news tidbits and rumors should not be written on Wikipedia, especially when unsourced.
- on the Yiddish language Wikipedia article about the Yiddish Wikipedia, five reasons are listed as to the purpose of the Yiddish Wikipedia in addition to simply being a free encyclopedia, with four of them being Judaism-related, and more specifically, related to the Haredi Jewish community (a subgroup of Orthodox Judaism which includes Hasidic Judaism). For example, about one of the reasons − to create Torah study, the following is written: "One [user] writes a sevara (Torah thought), reason, law, custom, or understanding [of the Torah], another [user] jumps up and questions it on the talk page, and changes it according to his conclusion, and the third makes a compromise. And so on until...a complete [discussion of] Torah is learned up."

Additional Judaism-related goals of the Yiddish Wikipedia are to spread Judaism and to create a virtual Jewish community online.

== Statistics ==
Yiddish Wikipedia statistics
Number of user accounts	Number of articles	Number of files	Number of active users	Number of administrators
62091	15815	981	49	3
