= Congregation Yetev Lev D'Satmar =

Kehilas Yetev Lev D'Satmar may refer to:

- Congregation Yetev Lev D'Satmar (Hooper Street, Brooklyn), a large Hasidic synagogue located at Kent Avenue and Hooper Street in Williamsburg, Brooklyn
- Congregation Yetev Lev D'Satmar (Rodney Street, Brooklyn), a large Hasidic synagogue located on Rodney Street in Williamsburg, Brooklyn
