= Situation Room (photograph) =

Photograph taken during Operation Neptune Spear

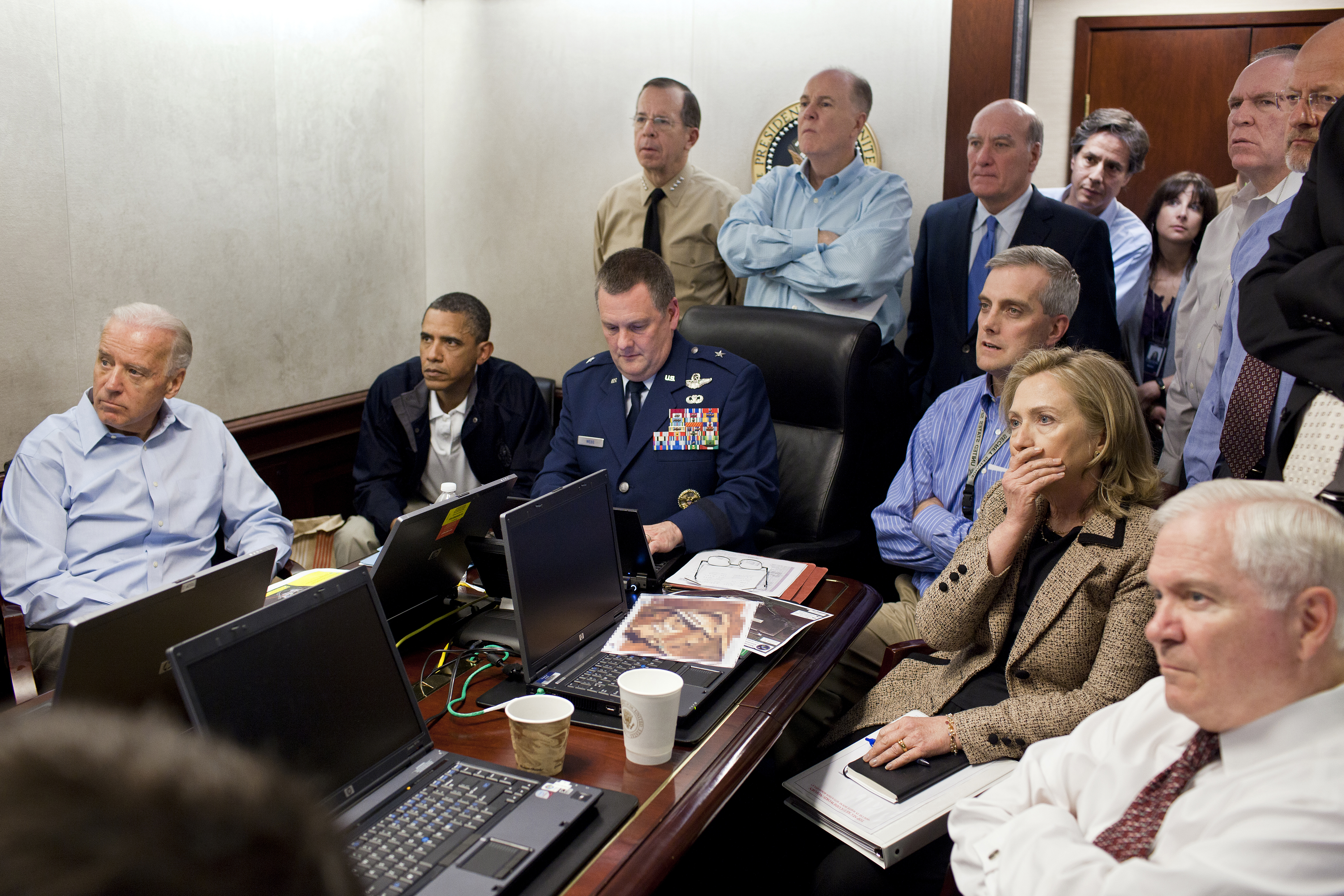
President Obama and his national security team in the White House Situation Room.

Situation Room is a photograph taken by Pete Souza, Chief Official White House Photographer, at 4:05 p.m. on May 1, 2011. The photograph shows U.S. president Barack Obama and his national security team in the White House Situation Room receiving live updates from Operation Neptune Spear, which led to the killing of al-Qaeda leader Osama bin Laden in Abbottabad, Pakistan.

== Background ==
Air Force Brigadier General Brad Webb was sitting at the table monitoring the raid on Osama bin Laden's compound when Michael Leiter, then director of the United States National Counterterrorism Center, entered the room. Leiter does not appear in the photograph, but was followed by Robert Gates, Hillary Clinton, Joe Biden, and others. Soon the president entered the room, commenting "I need to watch this," and sat down next to General Webb. According to journalist Peter Bergen, the group was watching a live feed from an unmanned drone flying overhead. Leon Panetta said that Obama did not see bin Laden being killed. Clinton said: "We could see or hear nothing when [the SEALs] went into the house. There was no communication or feedback coming so it was during that time period everyone was particularly focused on just trying to keep calm and keep prepared as to what would happen."

The picture was taken at 4:05 pm local time in Washington (16:05 EDT), which was 12:35 am local time in Afghanistan (20:00 UTC, May 1)—a few minutes after the SEALs reached the compound, and under 25 minutes before bin Laden was killed. President Obama later said he believed the picture was taken about the time the room's occupants were informed or realized that one of the raid's helicopters had crashed.

White House photographer Pete Souza commented on this photograph for Time in late 2012, writing:

Much has been made of this photograph that shows the President and Vice President and the national security team monitoring in real time the mission against Osama bin Laden, May 1, 2011. Some more background on the photograph: The White House Situation Room is actually comprised of several different conference rooms. The majority of the time, the President convenes meetings in the large conference room with assigned seats. But to monitor this mission, the group moved into the much smaller conference room. The President chose to sit next to Brigadier General Marshall B. 'Brad' Webb, Assistant Commanding General of Joint Special Operations Command, who was point man for the communications taking place. With so few chairs, others just stood at the back of the room. I was jammed into a corner of the room with no room to move. During the mission itself, I made approximately 100 photographs, almost all from this cramped spot in the corner. Please note: a classified document seen in front of Sec. Clinton has been obscured.

== People ==
Annotated photograph

The following people are pictured, from left to right:

=== Seated ===
1. Joe Biden, Vice President of the United States
2. Barack Obama, President of the United States
3. Brigadier General Marshall B. "Brad" Webb, Assistant Commanding General of the Joint Special Operations Command
4. Denis McDonough, Deputy National Security Advisor
5. Hillary Clinton, Secretary of State
6. Robert Gates, Secretary of Defense

=== Standing ===
1. Admiral Mike Mullen, Chairman of the Joint Chiefs of Staff
2. Tom Donilon, Assistant to the President for National Security Affairs
3. William M. Daley, White House Chief of Staff
4. Antony Blinken, National Security Advisor to the Vice President
5. Audrey Tomason, Director for Counterterrorism for the National Security Council
6. An unidentified person in a beige shirt behind Tomason (only a fragment of the person's shoulder is visible)
7. John O. Brennan, Assistant to the President for Homeland Security and Counterterrorism
8. James R. Clapper, Director of National Intelligence
9. A man in a black suit with a white tie. Though his head is out of frame, he has been identified as a CIA analyst, publicly known only as "John", who was "the first to put in writing [in summer 2010] that the CIA might have a legitimate lead on finding bin Laden."

== Reception ==
The photograph received much publicity after the news of Bin Laden's death was announced. CNN called it a "photo for the ages" and drew comparisons to other famous images of U.S. presidents such as Dewey Defeats Truman. Former White House photographer Eric Draper said that the photo captured "a defining moment in history very well." The photograph has also been the subject of commentary by historians and body language analysts.

Because the photograph was taken during the raid, it has been most noted for its intensity. Hillary Clinton, pictured in the photograph, described the moment as "the most intense 38 minutes of my life" while Obama commented that it may have been the longest 40 minutes of his life, possibly excepting when his daughter Sasha had meningitis as an infant. Brennan said "the minutes passed like hours and days" and Clapper said that "the tension in the air was palpable".

Particularly of note was Clinton's facial expression, holding her right hand over her mouth in apparent anxiety over the outcome of the raid. She later said that she was suffering from a spring allergy and was likely suppressing a cough. Regarding the photograph, Clinton said that she was unaware of the photographer in the room as she was so focused on the situation.

== Analysis ==
Some historians have commented on the historical significance of the photograph, particularly its depiction of the crossing of gender and racial boundaries. Lehigh University political science professor Saladin Ambar said that the picture suggests "a new American landscape that we're still crossing into." He continued, "When Obama was elected, there were some people who thought that we had crossed a racial threshold. What his presidency is revealing is that there are many crossings."

The photograph has also been noted to depict a change in presidential leadership style. Historian Clarence Lusane said that past presidents have felt a need to project "machismo" and "swagger." Meredith College sociology professor Lori Brown said it is significant, however, that Obama is neither in the center of the room nor in the tallest chair. Political analyst Cheryl Contee said "Obama's willingness to be photographed without the typical Oval Office swagger gives birth to a new type of swagger." She said that the image shows Obama's leadership style as a collaborator.

The New York Times commented on Clinton's expression in the photograph, writing, "She is what the French critic Roland Barthes called the 'punctum,' the not necessarily conspicuous detail that gives a photograph its emotional resonance." They also stated the mystery of the photograph—what are they looking at?—was analogous to the uncertainty of Western democracy's relationship with Islamic militant terrorism.

Ambar stated that the photograph also shows how entrenched women have become in U.S. politics; Clinton and Audrey Tomason are in the photograph, while the similar photograph of John F. Kennedy and his staff during the Cuban Missile Crisis does not show any women. Lori Brown said in a CNN article that the photograph also shows how women have made progress in U.S. political life, although Brown said that Clinton's visible reaction dulled the impact somewhat, because women "are often more physical in their emotional responses and in a 'power situation' it may not seem as acceptable."

Until the publishing of the photograph, Audrey F. Tomason, a woman identified by the White House as the Director for Counterterrorism, was unknown to the public. After the publication of the photo, because of the apparent proximity to President Barack Obama seen in the photograph, various rumors appeared regarding what her role was. She was the only woman, other than Hillary Clinton, in the photograph. She also appeared to be the only person in the photograph under 40 years of age. Alexis Madrigal, a senior editor at The Atlantic, said that Tomason "appeared to be an outlier in a room filled with the administration's heaviest hitters." Tommy Vietor, a United States National Security Council spokesperson, said that there were other young staffers in the room, but Tomason was the only one in the photograph. Vietor said "[t]here were at least half a dozen people with similar profiles in the immediate vicinity where that photo was taken." Madrigal added "The luck of the camera's gaze means that history will be able to place Tomason at a decisive moment in the war on terrorism, but not her colleagues." Little information is publicly available about Tomason, although Tufts University later confirmed that she is a Tufts graduate.

Robert Cardillo, deputy director of national intelligence, was cropped from the photo and was seated to the right of Vice President Biden.

== Alteration in Hasidic newspapers ==
The newspaper with censored photo (In the title, "When the wicked perish there is song", from Proverbs 11:10)

Di Tzeitung (The Journal), a Satmar Hasidic newspaper from Brooklyn, edited the image to remove Clinton and Tomason due to its policy of not running photographs with women because of modesty laws. The newspaper apologized for altering the image in breach of the terms of its release. The Washington Post issued a correction, noting that Di Tzeitung had not violated any White House copyright because the photograph was "in the public domain from the moment of inception". In addition, Dee Voch (The Week), a weekly Hasidic magazine from Brooklyn, also edited out the women.

The editing of images of women out of photographs is a common practice of Haredi newspapers. While some interpreted this practice as a result of inequality to women's rights in Hasidic Judaism, Di Tzeitung, in its statement, said it was done only because of modesty reasons, and should in no way be seen as degrading of women.

== Other uses ==
The photograph was used satirically on the cover of the May 13, 2011 issue of Private Eye magazine, suggesting that the people present were witnessing a massacre of the Liberal Democrats party in British local elections.

In the 2017 season five finale of the Netflix TV show House of Cards, fictional President Claire Underwood and her cabinet conduct a military operation in the White House Situation Room. The angle of the camera shot, placement of actors in the scene, their clothing, and even the placement of computers and coffee cups on the table, directly mimic Souza's photograph. The photograph was also mimicked in a shot in Bong Joon-ho's 2017 film Okja, only with a corporation taking the place of the U.S. government.

== See also ==
- List of photographs considered the most important

== External links and further reading ==
- Crawford, Jamie (May 1, 2012). "The bin Laden Situation Room revisited – One year later". CNN. Archived from the original on March 12, 2017.
- "Former CIA director reveals what it was like inside the White House situation room when Bin Laden was killed". Business Insider.
- "P050111PS-0210 ("President Barack Obama and Vice President Joe Biden, along with members of the national security team, receive an update on the mission against Osama bin Laden in the Situation Room of the White House, May 1, 2011")". Obama White House (Official White House Photographs). Flickr. May 1, 2011.
