= Ratnbildung =

Magazine

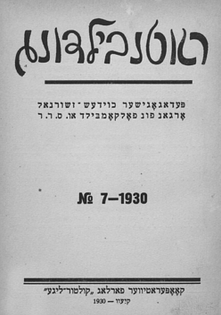
July 1930 issue of Ratnbildung

Ratnbildung (Yiddish: ראטנבילדונג, 'Soviet Education') was a Yiddish language pedagogical monthly magazine published in the Ukrainian Soviet Socialist Republic. It was an organ of the People's Commissariat for Education of the Ukrainian SSR. It was published form Kharkov 1927-1928, and from Kiev from 1929 to 1937. Copies of Ratnbildung contained 67 to 171 pages.
