= Daytshmerish =

Derogatory term for Germanized form of Yiddish

Daytshmerish (Yiddish: דײַטשמעריש) is a Yiddish derogatory term for Germanized variety of Yiddish orthography, style of speaking, and vocabulary.

== History and etymology ==
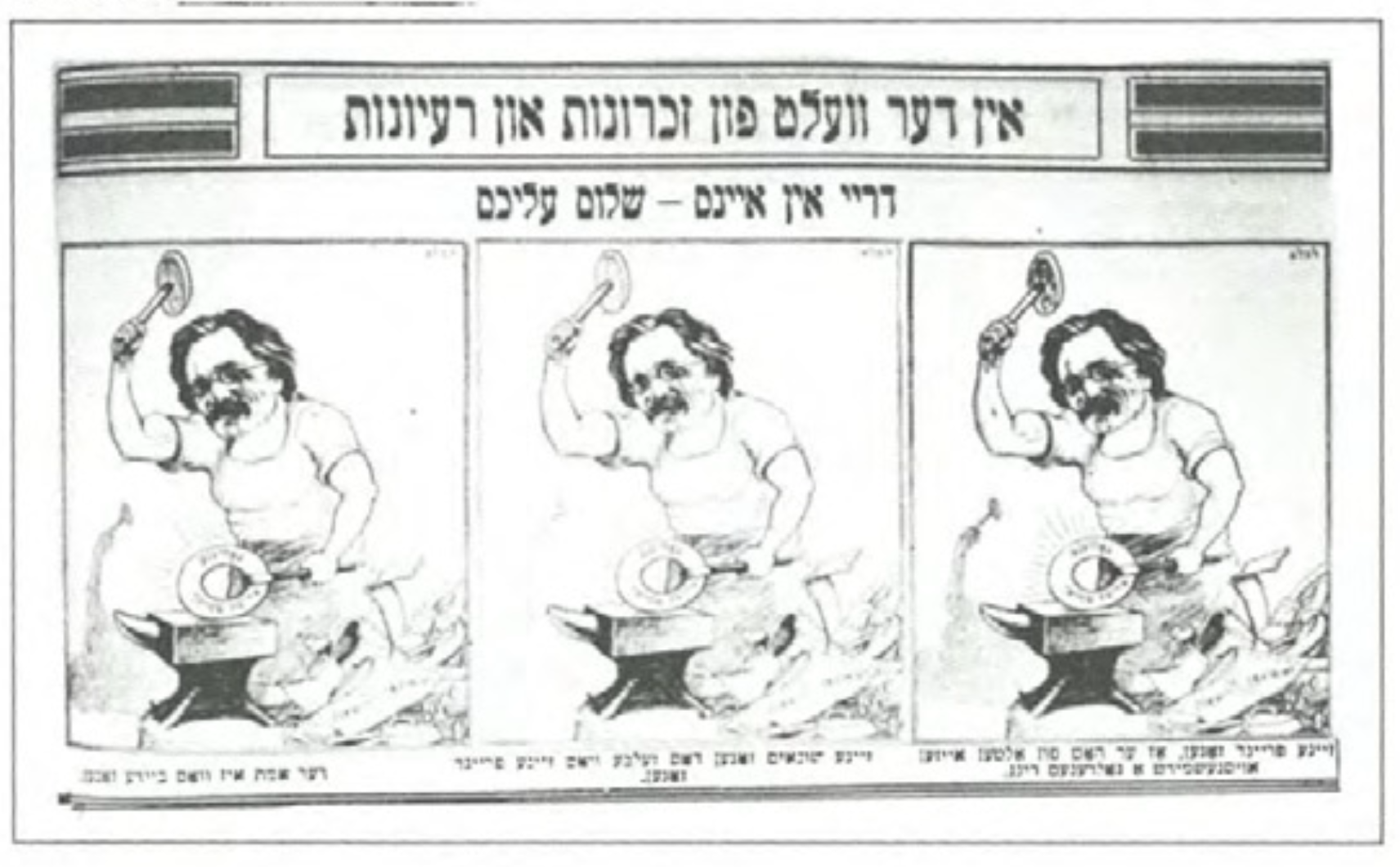
A drawing of Sholem Aleichem hammering the "jargon" form of Yiddish, into something of beauty. Published in Der Groyser Kundes newspaper.

The term was coined in the 19th century to describe the style of Yiddish spoken by some educated Eastern European Jews. Some educated Jews saw Yiddish as a lower-class slang (זשאַרגאָן, zhargon, "jargon") that could be 'improved' by inserting German terms. An example would be using German 'sogar' instead of Yiddish: אַפֿילו, romanized: afile, lit. 'even'. The many borrowings from German were intended to make users sound cultivated, but it sounded pompous and pretentious to those Yiddish speakers who had no sense of linguistic inferiority vis-à-vis German, thus it was often put to comic use by Yiddish playwrights and writers of fiction who parodied it.

The suggested etymology is as follows. In older Yiddish the word "German" was taytsh (cf. "Deutch"), and the interpreter into German was called taytcher. In 19th century the word would be dautsher to denote a Germanizer and his way of speaking was dautsherish. The extra letter "m" comes from the scornful prefix shm-.

According to the Yiddish scholar Dovid Katz, "prejudices and misconceptions" concerning Yiddish were promulgated by both antisemites and well-meaning Jewish assimilationists during the 19th century, both of whom regarded Yiddish as a degenerate form of German. According to Katz, critics of Yiddish often highlighted the German, Slavic, and Hebrew syncretism of Yiddish to allege that the language was impure and corrupted.

Sholem Aleichem is widely credited with elevating the prestige of Yiddish language as a cultured language in its own right.
