= Zalman Leib Teitelbaum =

One of the two Grand Rebbes of Satmar

Rebbe Yekusiel Yehuda Teitelbaum (Zalman Leib)
- יקותיאל יהודה טייטלבוים (Hebrew)
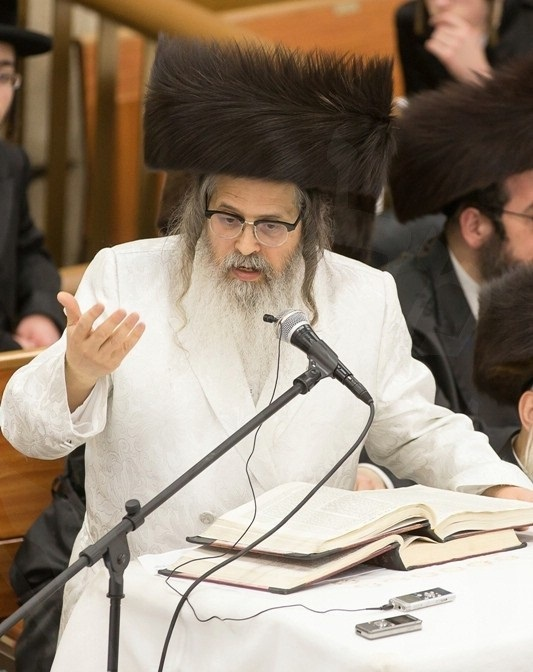

Personal life
- Born: 23 December 1951 (age 74) Williamsburg, Brooklyn, New York City, U.S.
- Spouse: Chaya Sarah
- Children: 10
- Dynasty: Satmar
- Occupation: Dean

Religious life
- Religion: Judaism
- Denomination: Hasidic

Jewish leader
- Predecessor: Moshe Teitelbaum
- Synagogue: Congregation Yetev Lev D'Satmar (Rodney Street, Brooklyn)
- Began: May 1999
- Dynasty: Satmar

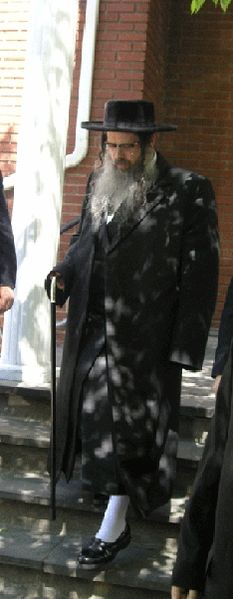
Yekusiel Yehuda Teitelbaum

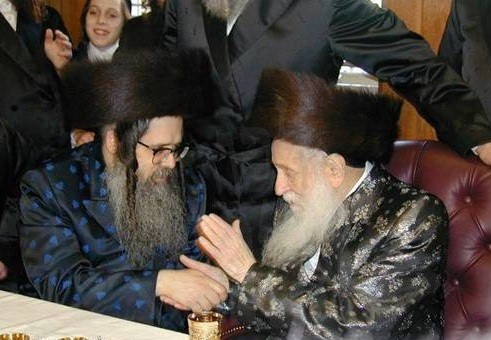
Teitelbaum (left) with his father Moshe Teitelbaum

Yekusiel Yehuda Teitelbaum (III), known by the Yiddish colloquial name Zalman Leib (born 23 December 1951), is one of the two Grand Rebbes of Satmar. He leads the dynasty's Williamsburg, Brooklyn faction, which is based at the community's central Congregation Yetev Lev D'Satmar on Rodney Street, Brooklyn. He is the dean of the Satmar yeshiva in Queens, New York.

== Early life and career ==
Teitelbaum is the third son born to Moshe Teitelbaum, the Grand Rebbe of the Satmar Hasidim, in Williamsburg, Brooklyn. His older brother is Aaron. Early on, Teitelbaum became the rabbi of the Sighet synagogue in nearby Borough Park, which had once been his father's synagogue. He later became the rabbi of the Satmar Hasidim in Jerusalem. In May 1999, he was designated by his father to lead the Williamsburg congregation at 152 Rodney Street, which was seen as a signal that Teitelbaum was to become the chief rabbi after his father's death. Additionally, he controls approximately ten smaller synagogues and gender-segregated schools in Williamsburg alone—with many more elsewhere—which cater to some 10,000 students. He oversees several charitable funds and large organizations, with the influential Yiddish newspaper Der Yid being published by his followers. In 2007, Newsweek named him the 15th most influential rabbi in the United States.

== Satmar succession feud ==
Prior to May 1999, it was generally assumed that Satmar would be led by Aaron after the death of their father, since he was the older brother. Aaron was his father's representative in communal affairs, and assumed his father's responsibilities while he was traveling. But Zalman Teitelbaum's designation as the local leader caused factions to start forming around both brothers. Aaron's supporters claimed that their father was persuaded by his advisers to appoint Zalman because they were worried that they would lose their influence if they fell under Aaron's regime.

When the Grand Rebbe died in April 2006, each side declared their rabbi as the chief rabbi. By that time, Aaron's supporters already controlled all of the assets in the community stronghold of Kiryas Joel, New York. They then initiated legal proceedings to take control of the Williamsburg holdings from Zalman's supporters, including control of the Brooklyn congregation's sacred cemetery. Since the court declined to render a decision, the status quo remained, which was seen as a victory for Zalman's faction. Subsequently, Aaron's followers established a parallel congregation in Williamsburg by erecting a dedicated synagogue on Hooper Street.

== Anti-Zionism ==
In keeping with the traditional beliefs of Satmar, Teitelbaum is a strong opponent of Zionism. He was closely affiliated with the Jerusalem-based anti-Zionist Eidah HaChareidis and its leader, Yitzchok Tuvia Weiss. Teitelbaum has referred to the State of Israel as "this generation's Amalek" and said that "the Zionists came from the seed of Amalek. There has never been such a sect that caused so much damage to the Jewish people." He opposed the 2013 proposed draft of Haredi men by the Israel Defense Forces and encouraged resistance against the draft decree: "We must fight it uncompromisingly so that such ideas won't even cross their minds."

Following the October 7th attacks, Teitelbaum condemned the activities of Neturei Karta.

== COVID-19 wedding controversy ==
In October 2020, during the COVID-19 pandemic, a whistleblower reported to authorities that a wedding was planned to attract 10,000 worshippers at the Williamsburg synagogue, in contravention of regulations regarding public gatherings. Governor Andrew Cuomo directed that the wedding of Teitelbaum's grandson could not proceed on the basis of a health order that read "...the owners or occupants of the venue to immediately cancel or postpone any event in excess of the 50 person gathering limit."

== Personal life ==
Teitelbaum married Chaya Sarah, the daughter of the previous Bistritzer Rebbe of Brooklyn. Teitelbaum's sons lead both the Borough Park and Jerusalem congregations that were previously administered by him.

== See also ==
- Hasidic Judaism
- Joel Teitelbaum
- Haredim and Zionism
