= Congregation Yetev Lev D'Satmar (Hooper Street, Brooklyn) =

Hasidic synagogue in Brooklyn, New York

Kehilas Yetev Lev D'Satmar
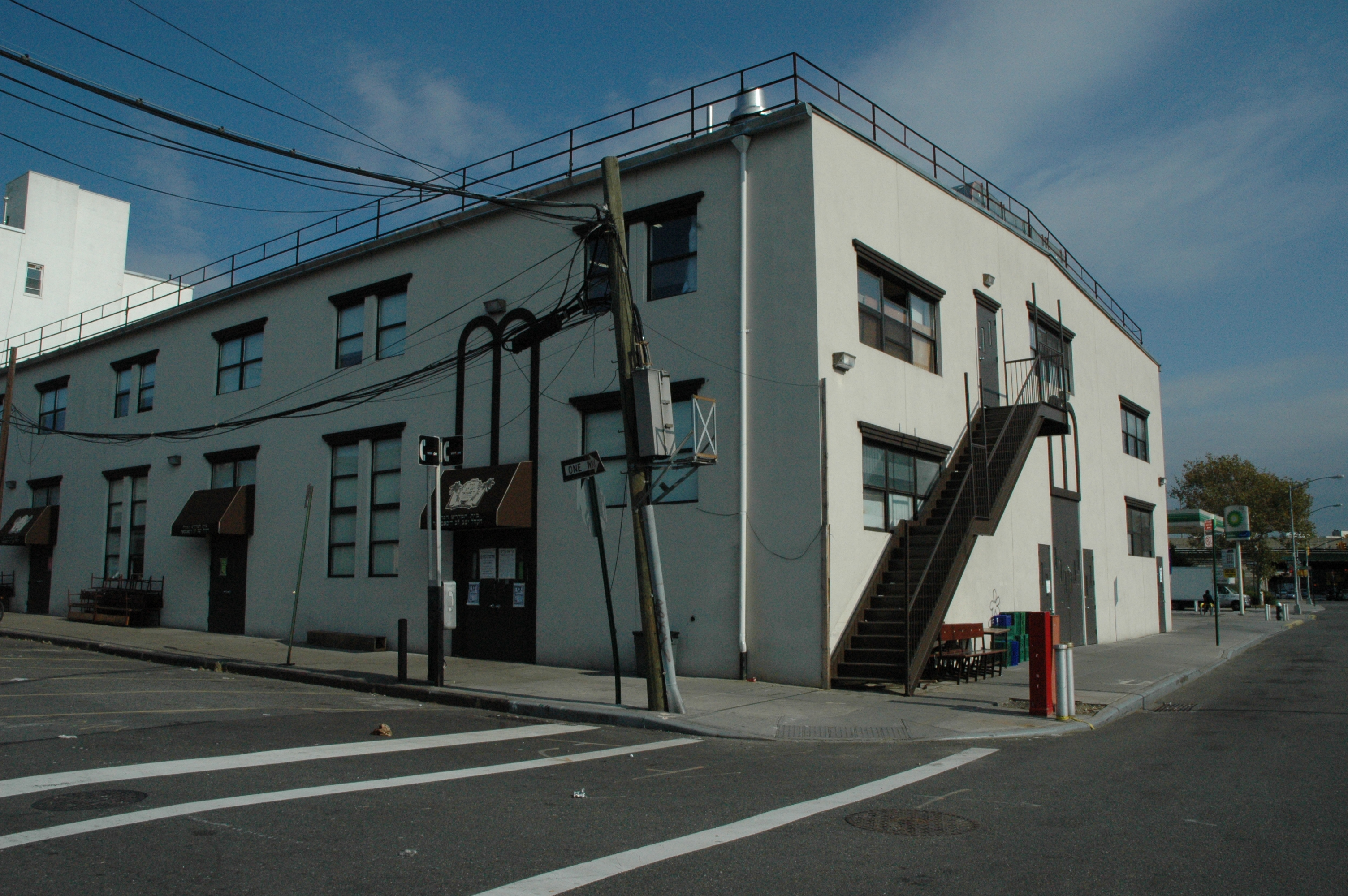

- Location in New York City

Religion
- Affiliation: Haredi Judaism
- Rite: Nusach Sefard (Satmar)
- Ecclesiastical or organizational status: Synagogue
- Leadership: Rabbi Aaron Teitelbaum (Grand Rebbe)
- Status: Active

Location
- Location: Kent Avenue and Hooper Street, Williamsburg, Brooklyn, New York City, New York
- Country: United States
- Interactive map of Kehilas Yetev Lev D'Satmar
- Coordinates: 40°42′04″N 73°57′47″W

Architecture
- Established: 2006 (as a congregation)
- Completed: 2006

Specifications
- Capacity: 2,300 – 4,350 (seated); 7,000 (total)
- Interior area: 13,000 to 18,000 square feet (1,200 to 1,700 m^{2})
- Materials: Steel frame, cinder block, stucco

Congregation Yetev Lev D'Satmar is a large Satmar Hasidic synagogue located at Kent Avenue and Hooper Street in Williamsburg, Brooklyn, New York City, New York, United States.

Its building was constructed in 2006 by followers of Aaron Teitelbaum, as a result of a feud with followers of Zalman Teitelbaum (both sons of the deceased Satmar rebbe Moshe Teitelbaum). It has been dubbed the "miracle synagogue" because it was constructed in just 14 business days.

== Background ==
In 1984, Satmar Rebbe Moshe Teitelbaum placed his oldest son, Aaron, in charge of the Satmar community in Kiryas Joel, New York, but in 1999, he appointed his third son, Zalman, as his helper in Williamsburg . Since then, the two sons and their respective followers have been feuding over who is the rightful successor of Moshe, with the followers of Aaron attempting to gain control of approximately $372 million (today $594 million) worth of Satmar buildings and land (including its synagogues) in Williamsburg, and elsewhere.

Following his death in April 2006, Moshe's will supported Zalman, as did a Satmar rabbinical court, though supporters of Aaron dispute the validity of both. After a New York State court ruled in July that the dispute was outside of its jurisdiction, followers of Aaron, who, in previous years, had been excluded from main Satmar institutions—including the main Satmar synagogue on Rodney Street—and celebrated the High Holy Days in a large tent, started plans to build an alternative main synagogue.

== Construction ==
In 2006, the synagogue was built in 14 days by a team of over 200 workers, including 125 employees and 80 volunteers. Workers worked 18-hour days to have the building ready in time for the Jewish New Year, pausing only on Shabbat.

As a result of the rapid pace of construction, a number of the city's Department of Buildings rules were violated, including "working without a sidewalk shed" and "straying from approved plans". The department did not take action after two reports of unsafe working conditions, but issued a stop-work order after a worker fell about 20 feet from a metal structure on September 15. Nevertheless, work continued; according to the New York Sun, Jennifer Givner, a department spokesperson "could not rule out the possibility that the department had given the go-ahead to resume work", and the congregation denied that it broke any rules.

== Building ==
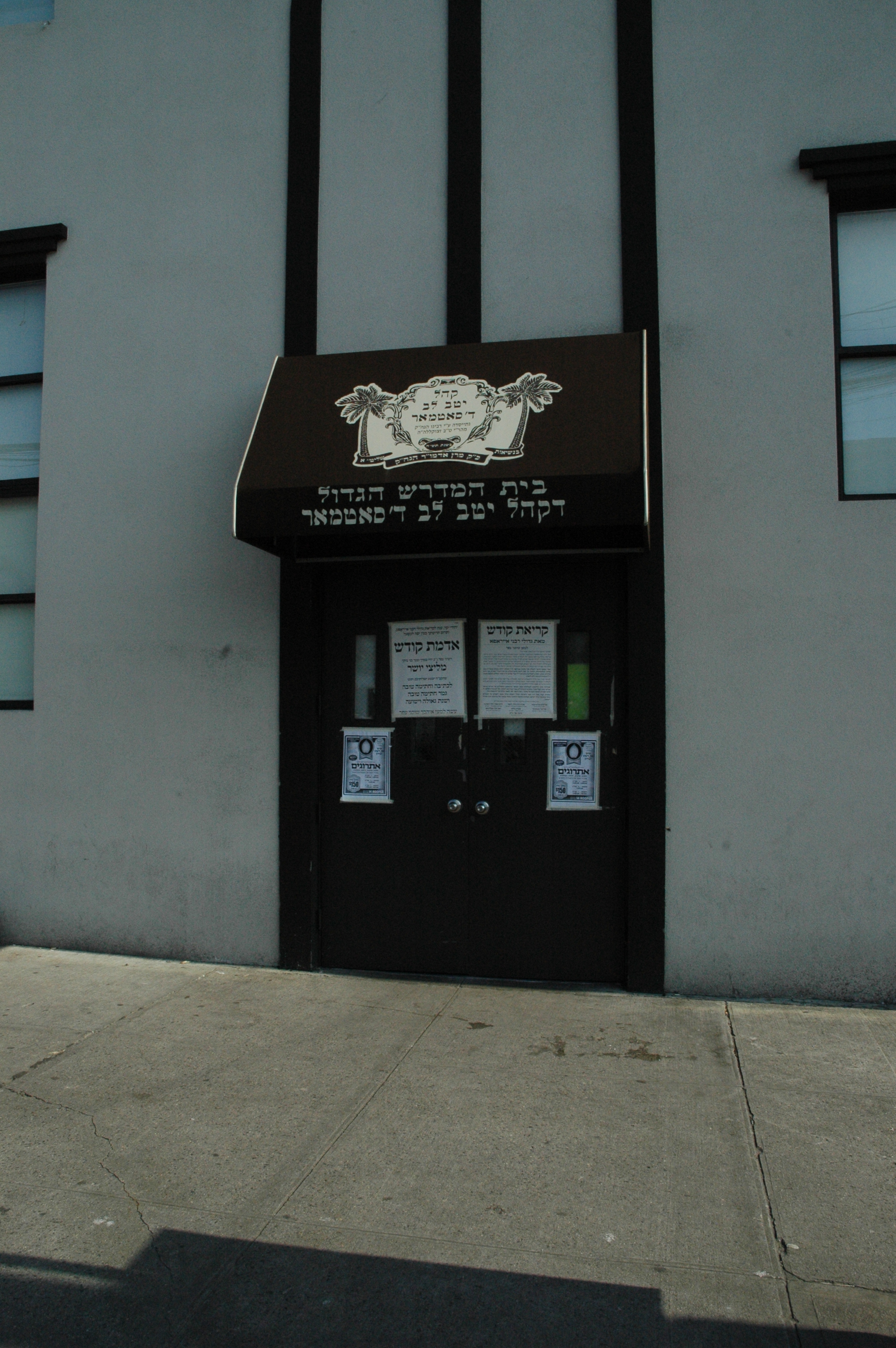
The Hebrew lettering on the awning reads "Bais Hamedrash Hagodol d'Kahal Yetev Lev d'Satmar"

The 13,000-to-18,000-square-foot (1,200 to 1,700 m^{2}) steel frame structure has cinder block walls, and is covered in stucco. The interior was not fully finished in time for the New Year, and it was planned that the concrete floors would be covered with wood and the walls with marble in time for the Simchat Torah holiday three weeks later. The structure seats between 2,300 and 4,350, and has a total capacity of 7,000 people.

The building was named after Aaron's great-great-grandfather, Rabbi Yekusiel Yehuda Teitelbaum, known as "The Yetev Lev", after the name of a book of Torah commentary he published. Zalman's supporters derisively referred to the synagogue as "the Home Depot shul".

== Subsequent events ==
In 2016, the synagogue's president, Rabbi Isaac (or Isack) Rosenberg—one of the main supporters and financial backers of the synagogue's construction—died, after being caught in a rip tide off the coast of Florida. The funeral took place on Hooper Street, in front of the synagogue, which was filled with nearly 1,000 mourners.

In October 2020, during the COVID-19 pandemic, a whistleblower reported to authorities that a wedding planned to attract 10,000 worshippers at the rival Rodney Street synagogue, in contravention of regulations regarding public gatherings. Governor Andrew Cuomo directed that the wedding of the grandson of Rabbi Zalman Leib Teitelbaum could not proceed on the basis of a health order that read "...the owners or occupants of the venue to immediately cancel or postpone any event in excess of the 50 person gathering limit." A much smaller event involving the Rabbi's family went ahead. A month later, another wedding was held, this time at the Hooper Street synagogue for the grandson of Aaron Teitelbaum, organised in private, attracting an estimated 7,000 worshippers, also in contravention of health orders. The Hooper Street congregation was fined $15,000 and the City of New York placed a cease-and-desist order on the building.
