= Congregation Yetev Lev D'Satmar (Rodney Street, Brooklyn) =

Hasidic synagogue in Brooklyn, New York

Kehal Yetev Lev D'Satmar
- Yiddish: קהל יטב לב ד'סאטמאר
- Logo of Kehal Yetev Lev D'Satmer

- Location in New York City

Religion
- Affiliation: Haredi Judaism
- Rite: Nusach Sefard (Satmar)
- Ecclesiastical or organizational status: Synagogue
- Leadership: Rabbi Zalman Teitelbaum (Grand Rebbe)
- Status: Active

Location
- Location: 152 Rodney Street, Williamsburg, Brooklyn, New York City, New York
- Country: United States
- Interactive map of Kehal Yetev Lev D'Satmar
- Coordinates: 40°42′17″N 73°57′37″W

Website
- satmarnews.wordpress.com

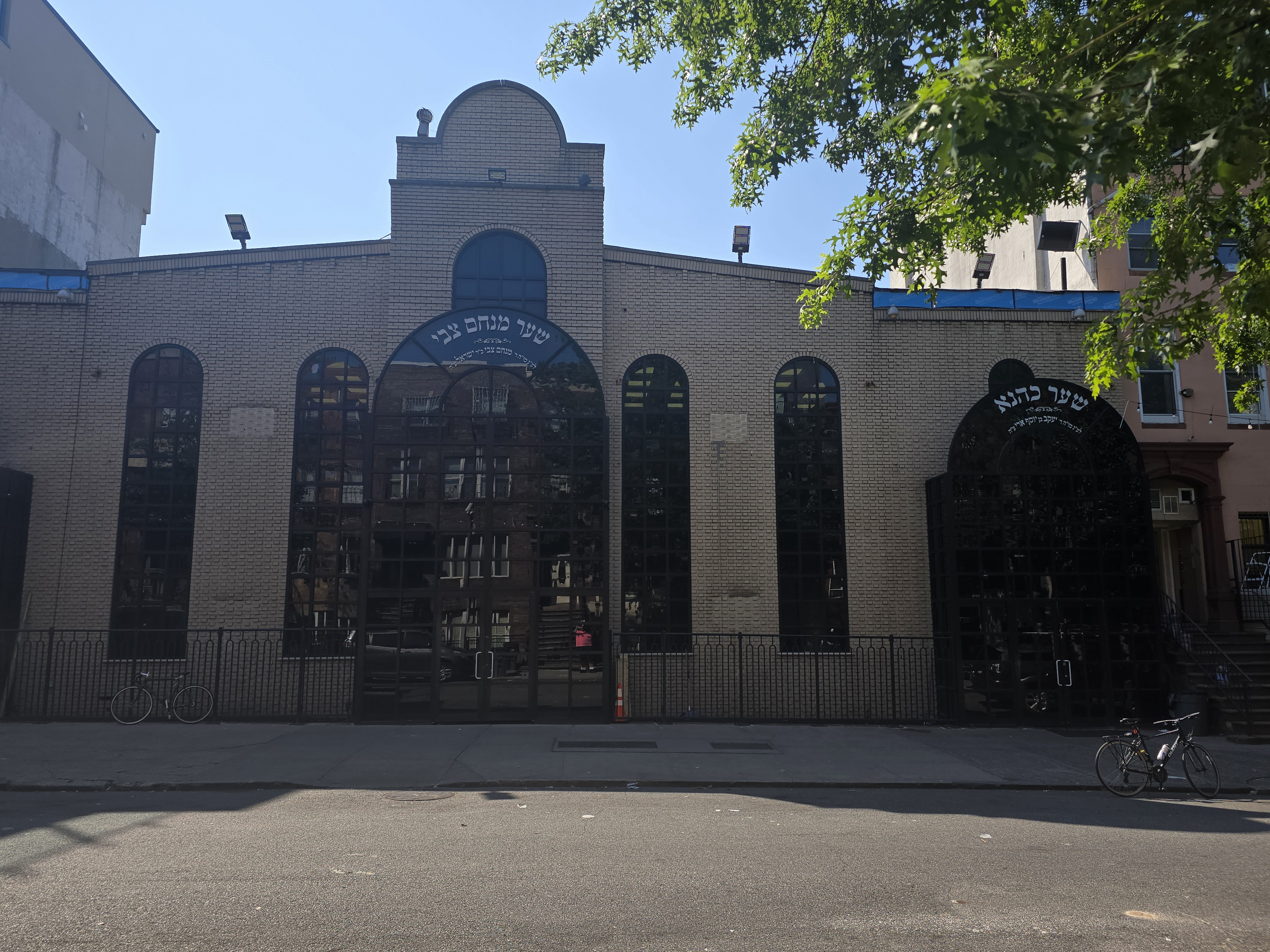
Congregation Yetev Lev D'satmar

Congregation Yetev Lev D'Satmar (Yiddish: קהל יטב לב ד'סאטמאר) is a large Satmar Hasidic synagogue located at 152 Rodney Street in Williamsburg, Brooklyn, in New York City, New York, United States.

== History ==
The synagogue was constructed to replace the previous main Satmar synagogue on Bedford Avenue, which could not accommodate the congregation's growing membership. It is now the main synagogue for followers of Zalman Teitelbaum, son of the deceased Satmar rebbe Moshe Teitelbaum. in the summer of 2025 due to the growth of the community the synagogue went through major construction by taking down the gallerys in the main hall giving space for bleachers to be placed

The monument of the Sigeter Rebbe, Yekusiel Yehuda Teitelbaum (1808–1883), spells Yetev with two yuds, (Note: Monument of the Yetev Lev; see File:Teie3.jpg) whereas the Congregation Yetev Lev D'Satmar on Rodney Street spells Yetev with only one. (Note: "Kehal Yetev Lev D'Satmar"; see File:KehalYetevLev.jpg)

== Controversy ==
In October 2020, during the COVID-19 pandemic, a whistleblower reported to authorities that a wedding planned to attract 10,000 worshippers at the synagogue, in contravention of regulations regarding public gatherings. Governor Andrew Cuomo directed that the wedding of the grandson of Rabbi Zalman Teitelbaum could not proceed on the basis of a health order that read "...the owners or occupants of the venue to immediately cancel or postpone any event in excess of the 50 person gathering limit." A much smaller event involving the Rabbi's family went ahead. A month later, another wedding was held, this time for the grandson of Rabbi Aaron Teitelbaum, held at the rival Hooper Street synagogue, organised in private, attracting an estimated 7,000 worshippers, also in contravention of health orders. The Hooper Street congregation was fined $15,000 and the government of New York City placed a cease-and-desist order on the building.

== See also ==
- Congregation Yetev Lev D'Satmar (Hooper Street, Brooklyn)
