= Correction (newspaper) =

Notice of a mistake that appeared in a past issue of a newspaper

A correction in a newspaper consists of posting a public notice about a typographical error or factual mistake in a previously published article.

Newspapers usually have specific policies for readers to report factual errors. Generally, this requires the reader to contact an editor, pointing out the mistake and providing the correct information. Sometimes, an editor or affected reporter will be asked to refer to a note or press release to determine how the mistake was made.

In print newspapers, a correction notice will often appear in its own column in a subsequent issue.

In online news media, a "trashline" or "advisory line" may be added to the top of a corrected article. According to the Reuters Handbook of Journalism, "the trashline should say exactly why a story is being withdrawn, corrected, refiled or repeated. All trashlines on refiles and corrections must include the word 'corrects' or 'correcting'."

A correction differs from a clarification, which clears up a statement that – while factually correct – may result in a misunderstanding or an unfair assumption.

== Examples ==
Most newspaper errors are relatively minor, but even mere typos or atomic typos can adversely affect a story, such as:

- Names – Names misspelled, someone was misidentified (e.g., in a photograph), their professional title was incorrect.
- Numbers – e.g., "the lawsuit was for $8 million, not $8 billion".
- Time/date/place – e.g., "the event will be on Friday, not Saturday".

However, some corrections are the result of major mistakes or carelessness in reporting, and in extreme examples involve such things as completely incorrect facts, gross misquotes and extreme misrepresentations. Following are some examples:

From The Guardian, 2004:

In our profile of Daniel Dennett (pages 20 to 23, Review, April 17), we said he was born in Beirut. In fact, he was born in Boston. His father died in 1947, not 1948. He married in 1962, not 1963. The seminar at which Stephen Jay Gould was rigorously questioned by Dennett's students was Dennett's seminar at Tufts, not Gould's at Harvard. Dennett wrote Darwin's Dangerous Idea before, not after, Gould called him a "Darwinian fundamentalist". Only one chapter in the book, not four, is devoted to taking issue with Gould. The list of Dennett's books omitted Elbow Room, 1984, and The Intentional Stance, 1987. The marble sculpture, recollected by a friend, that Dennett was working on in 1963 was not a mother and child. It was a man reading a book.

From the New York Daily News, 2009:

Correction: It has come to the attention of the Daily News that a number of statements in this article written for the Daily News by a freelance reporter are, or may be, false. Cornell University has told us that Shante did not receive any degree from it under either her birth or stage name. We have confirmed that prior to the article, at least four publications on Cornell's own website reported that Shante had earned a Ph.D. from the university. Those references have now been removed. And in response to an inquiry today, Marymount College stated that Shante attended there for less than one semester. Numerous e-mail and telephone inquiries by the freelance reporter to Marymount during the preparation of the article to confirm Shante's account were not responded to. Finally, there have been recent media reports that there never was an education clause in Shante's recording contract. When the reporter contacted Warner Brothers Records about the contract before the article, its only response was that it was having difficulty finding someone within the company who could "talk eloquently" about it.

In 2003, The New York Times published an article containing factual errors and misquotes contained in articles written by Jayson Blair, the reporter who became the central figure in the newspaper's plagiarism scandal earlier in the year. The corrections affected 10 articles that had been published from 2000 to 2003, with the errors reported to the newspaper after the scandal broke.

One 2007 study suggested that "fewer than 2 percent of factually flawed articles" in daily newspapers are actually followed by a correction.

== See also ==
- Erratum: correction in publications and industrial specifications.
- Hamilton Naki: an incident of delayed corrections.
- Journalism ethics and standards
- Retractions in academic publishing
