= Aaron Teitelbaum =

One of the two Grand Rebbes of Satmar

Rebbe Aaron Teitelbaum
- אהרן טייטלבוים
- Grand Rabbi Aaron Teitelbaum, Satmar Rebbe, in synagogue, on Hanukkah, in Kiryas Joel, New York State

Personal life
- Born: 20 October 1947 (age 79) Brooklyn, New York, U.S.
- Spouse: Sasha
- Children: Menachem Mendel, Chaye, Sarah Miriam, Hinda, Chyiam Hersh, Joel, Margulis
- Parent(s): Moshe Teitelbaum, Pessel Leah
- Dynasty: Satmar
- Occupation: Rabbi, Rosh yeshiva

Religious life
- Religion: Judaism
- Denomination: Hasidic

Jewish leader
- Predecessor: Moshe Teitelbaum
- Residence: Kiryas Joel, New York
- Dynasty: Satmar

Aaron Teitelbaum (born 20 October 1947) is an American rabbi who is one of the two Grand Rebbes of Satmar, and the chief rabbi of the Satmar community in Kiryas Joel, New York.

== Background ==
Aaron Teitelbaum is the oldest son of the late Grand Rabbi of Satmar Moshe Teitelbaum, who was the nephew of the late Satmar Rebbe, Grand Rabbi Joel Teitelbaum. Aaron Teitelbaum married Sasha, the daughter of Grand Rabbi Moshe Yehoshua Hager, the previous Vizhnitzer Rebbe of Bnei Brak, Israel.

In 1985, Aaron Teitelbaum was appointed as the chief rabbi and rosh yeshiva of the Satmar congregation in Kiryas Joel, which gave him authority over all the community's affairs. Some of the residents of Kiryas Joel at that time resented the appointment of Aaron, having issues with his personality and controlling nature.

== Satmar succession feud ==
In May 1999, Moshe Teitelbaum appointed his third son, Zalman Teitelbaum, as the local leader of the Williamsburg congregation. This was seen by some as a signal from Moshe that Zalman was to become Chief Rabbi after his death.

Prior to May 1999, it was assumed that after the death of Moshe Teitelbaum, Satmar would be led by Aaron Teitelbaum, the eldest son. He was his father's representative in communal affairs, and assumed his father's responsibilities when his father traveled.

Moshe's appointment of Zalman as the local leader caused factions to form around Aaron and Zalman. Aaron supporters claimed that Moshe was "swayed by his advisers" to appoint Zalman because the advisers were concerned they would lose influence under Aaron's regime.

In April 2006, when Moshe died, each side declared their rabbi as the chief rabbi. At that time, Aaron supporters already controlled all assets in Kiryas Joel. Aaron supporters initiated legal proceedings to take control of the Williamsburg holdings from the Zalman supporters, including control of the sacred cemetery of the Brooklyn congregation. The court declined to render a decision, leaving the status quo. The non-decision was seen as a victory for the Zalman faction. Aaron's followers constructed, and began worshiping in, their own synagogue on Hooper Street, Brooklyn.

== Positions ==
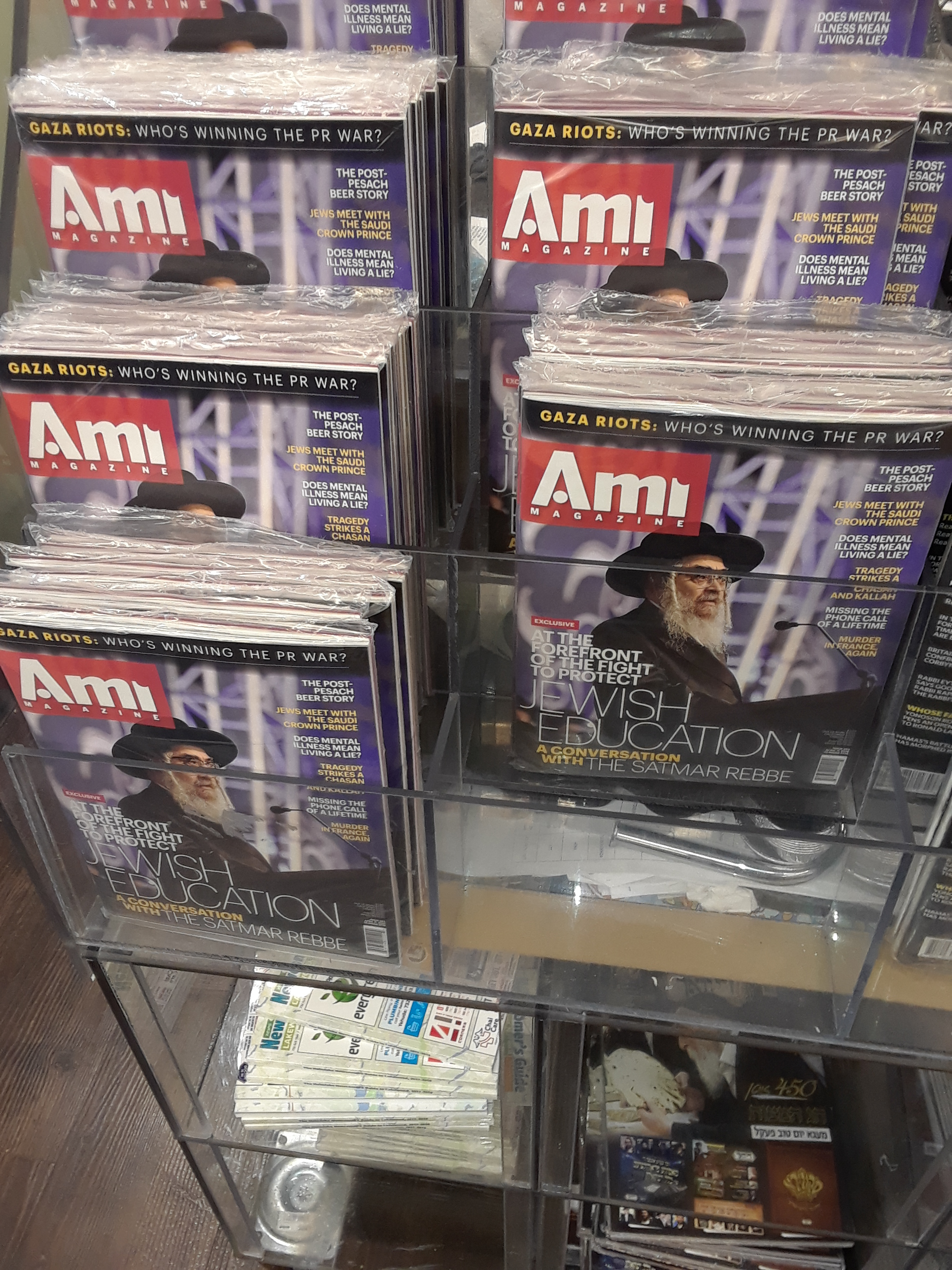
Teitelbaum on the front page of Ami magazine, as part of a report on his activism

In May 2012, Teitelbaum forbade his followers from possessing computers in their homes, unless the computers are strictly necessary for a business and have a content-control software program. He also ruled that his followers may not possess smartphones under any circumstances.

In keeping with the traditional beliefs of Satmar, Teitelbaum is firmly opposed to Zionism. Teitelbaum is affiliated with the Jerusalem-based anti-Zionist Edah HaChareidis, particularly with the organization's vice president, Moishe Sternbuch.

In April 2013, Teitelbaum denounced the proposed draft of Haredi men by the Israel Defense Forces as "a decree worse than the annihilation of the Jewish people".

In June 2014, contemporaneous to the 2014 kidnapping and murder of Israeli teenagers, Teitelbaum blamed the parents of the dead teenagers for their murder, proclaiming in a speech broadcast on Kol Satmar:

"During the funerals, the parents eulogized their sons, but I think it would have been preferable if they had done teshuva [repented], if they had said viduy [confession] with tears, in the nusach [style] that is used on Yom Kippur, to repent for their decision to live and learn Torah in a place of barbaric murderers."

Teitelbaum has expressed his wishes to establish a Satmar community in Romania.

In a historic first, during the 2024 United States presidential election, he shifted from the Satmars’ traditional stance with the Democratic party to endorse Donald Trump over Kamala Harris for President.

== Children ==
- Rabbi Menachem Mendel, heir apparent, previously served as a Chief Rabbi of the Satmar community, and also as a Rosh Yeshiva, in Antwerp, Belgium. In 2006, according to his father's order, he returned to the United States and was appointed to serve as a Chief Rabbi of his father's followers in Williamsburg. In 1984, in a wedding which took place in Nassau Coliseum with the participation of tens of thousands of people, he married his first cousin, Rebbetzin Brucha Sima, daughter of Rabbi Berish Meisles, the Chief Rabbi of the Satmar community in Borough Park and son-in-law of the deceased Grand Rabbi Moshe Teitelbaum of Satmar.
- Rebbetzin Chaya, married to Rabbi Chanoch Henich, son of Grand Rabbi Yitzchok Ashkenazi of Alesk.
- Rebbetzin Sarah Miriam, married to Rabbi Boruch, son of Grand Rabbi Nochum Efraim Teitelbaum of Volova.
- Rebbetzin Hinda, married Rabbi Shimon Zev, son of Rabbi Zalman Leib Meisles, Chief Rabbi of the local Satmar community in Sea Gate.
- Rabbi Chaim Tzvi, serves as a Rabbi of the Sighet synagogue in Williamsburg. Married to Rebbetzin Rivkah Sarah Chaya, granddaughter of Rabbi Moshe Halberstam, the previous Grand Rabbi of the Kiviashd community in Brooklyn. Named for his great-grandfather.
- Rebbetzin Channa, married Rabbi Duvid Dov, son of Grand Rabbi Yosef Tzvi Dushinsky (the second), the current Rebbe of the Dushinsky dynasty in Jerusalem.
- Rabbi Yoel, married Rivkah Blima, daughter of Rabbi Leibish Eichenstein from Monsey.
- Rebbetzin Margulis, married Rabbi Yosef, son of Rabbi Yoel Rokeach from Monsey.

== See also ==
- Hasidic Judaism
