= Kindline =

Yiddish children's magazine

- Editor-in-chief: David Reiner
- Staff writers: Fishel Shachter; Joseph Kwadrat; Dovid Weber
- Staff Illustrators: Batsheva Havlin; Avram Zmora
- Frequency: Weekly
- Founder: Mendel Paneth
- Founded: 2014
- First issue: December 16, 2014
- Company: Kindline Enterprises, Inc.
- Country: US
- Based in: Brooklyn NY
- Language: Yiddish

Kindline (Yiddish: קינדליין, /kɪndlaɪn/) is a New York City–based Yiddish-language weekly magazine founded in late 2014 by then editor-in-chief Mendel Paneth.

== Description ==
Originally aimed at children and young adults, Kindline is now read by all ages, and distributed worldwide weekly. Distribution scope is chiefly in areas where Yiddish readers reside, which include the United States, Canada, the UK, Belgium, Switzerland, Austria, and Israel.

Articles and features include an elucidation of the Weekly Torah portion, world history, Jewish history, wildlife, travel, comics, crafts, puzzles, parables, and stories.

Kindline is unique among Charedi publications in that writers and illustrators must attribute their work using their real name within the magazine, and not use a pseudonym as is traditionally accepted at many Yiddish publications. Kindline writers and editors are mostly noted educators, teachers or speakers in the Chareidi community. The editorial board includes author and lecturer, Fishel Shachter, editor-in-chief Mendel Paneth and Dovid Weber. Staff writers include Ari Abramowitz, and historian Joseph Kwadrat among many others.

Kindline weekly illustrations and comics are mostly the works of Batsheva Havlin, Avram Zmora, Motty Heller and several other artists. However, drawings and comics series by acclaimed Israeli artists, such as Yoel Waxberger, Gadi Pollak, Jacky Yarhi, Deborah Kotovsky are frequently published and appear regularly in special issues, such as the Purim or Pesach magazines.

=== Books ===
In collaboration with illustrators, writers, and publishing company Kinder Shpiel, Kindline regularly publishes hardcover comic books of comic serials and other weekly columns that were previously printed in the magazine.

== History ==
The first edition of Kindline appeared on December 16, 2014.

=== Conflict and leadership changes ===
In February 2021, Mendel Paneth, the founder and editor-in-chief of Kindline, announced his resignation from the magazine. This decision followed a prolonged dispute with David Reiner, an investor in Kindline. Paneth accused Reiner of financial misconduct, alleging embezzlement and mismanagement of company funds over several years. This dispute had impacted Paneth's management of the magazine, leading him to start a new journal titled "Hundert." In the interim, Kindline was overseen by Mrs. Paneth.

However, control of the magazine soon shifted to David Reiner, who managed it independently. Reiner initiated a campaign against Paneth and "Hundert," involving various tactics and securing a unilateral boycott from Rabbi Asher Landa of the Beit Din Beit Yosef in Borough Park, which was subsequently shuttered. In 2024, Mendel Paneth filed a RICO lawsuit again several rabbinical courts "alleging a conspiracy to sabotage his business and deprive him of a livelihood as punishment for defying a rabbinic judgment."
