= El Puente =

El Puente, meaning "The Bridge" in Spanish, may refer to:

- El Puente, Cantabria, capital of the municipality of Guriezo, Cantabria, Spain
- El Puente (Guarayos), a municipality in Santa Cruz, Bolivia
- El Puente del Arzobispo, a municipality in the province of Toledo, Castile-La Mancha, Spain
- El Puente (Maya site), a Maya archaeological site in the department of Copán in Honduras
- El Puente Academy for Peace and Justice, a public high school in Williamsburg, Brooklyn, New York City
- El Puente del Papa, a bridge in Monterrey, Nuevo León, Mexico
- El Puente (coalition), a grassroots environmental justice coalition located in the towns of Williamsburg and Greenpoint, Brooklyn, New York

== Other uses ==
- El Puente (TV series), a Spanish reality television series.

== See also ==
- Puente (disambiguation)
