= Taylor–Wythe Houses =

Public housing development in Brooklyn, New York

- NYCHA property
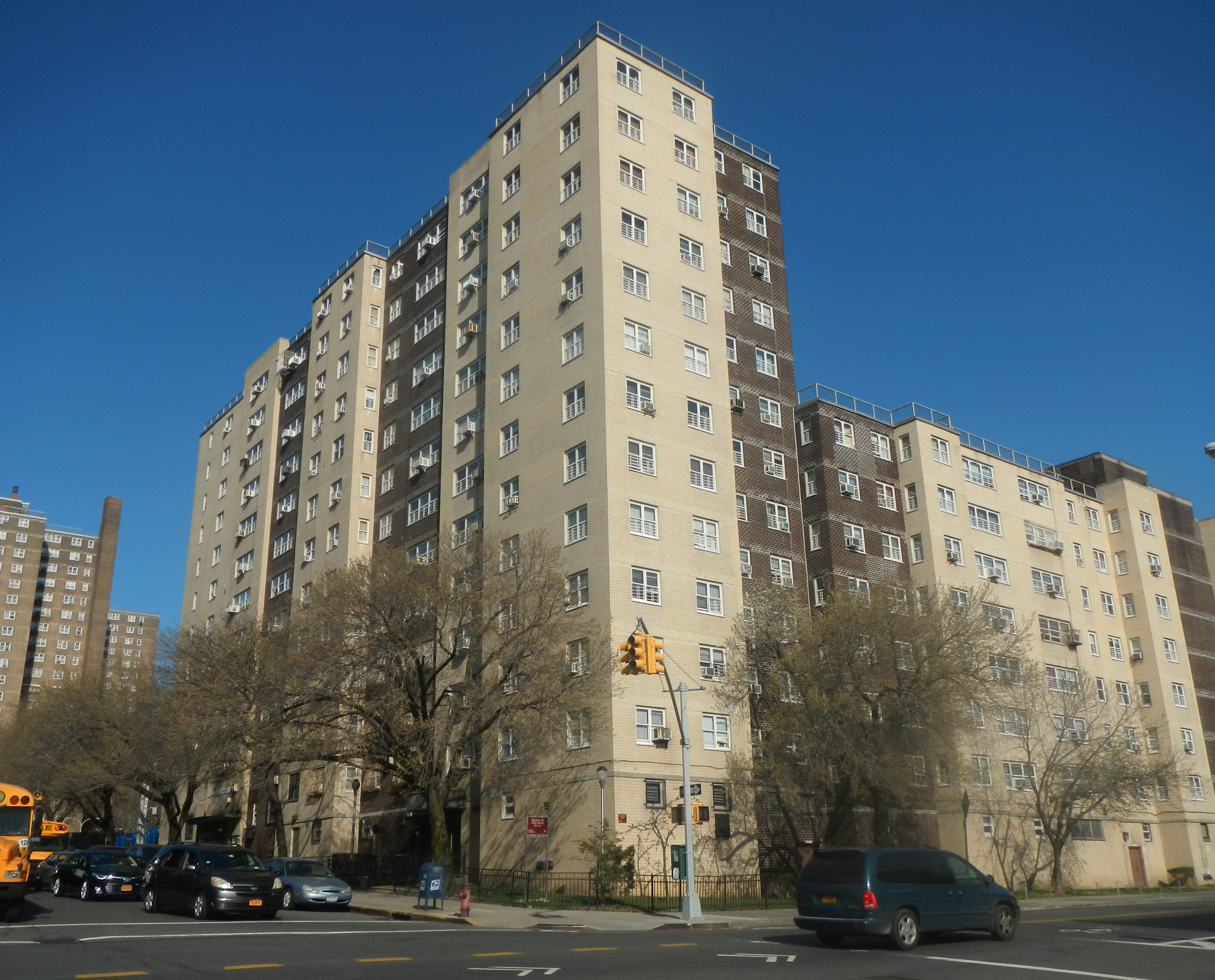
- Location within New York City
- Coordinates: 40.704570°N 73.964960°W
- Country: United States
- State: New York
- City: New York City
- Borough: Brooklyn
- Construction finished: 1974
- ZIP codes: 11211
- Area codes: 718, 347, 929, and 917

The Taylor–Wythe Houses is a New York City Housing Authority development in the South Williamsburg neighborhood, in Brooklyn, New York City.

== Development ==
The Taylor–Wythe Houses were completed on June 30, 1974 and consist of five buildings, 8, 11, 12 and 13 stories high on 4.27 acres (17,300 m^{2}). There are 525 apartments housing some 1,186 residents. The development is bounded by Wythe Avenue, Ross Street, and Clymer Street. The B44, B62, B67 buses and the J, M, and Z trains subway routes service the area. The neighborhood is a mix of Hispanic, African-American, and Hasidic families, with gentrification as an ongoing process that is transforming the landscape.

== See also ==
- New York City Housing Authority
- Independence Towers – another NYCHA housing complex adjacent to the site
