= Electoral history of Nydia Velázquez =

American political record

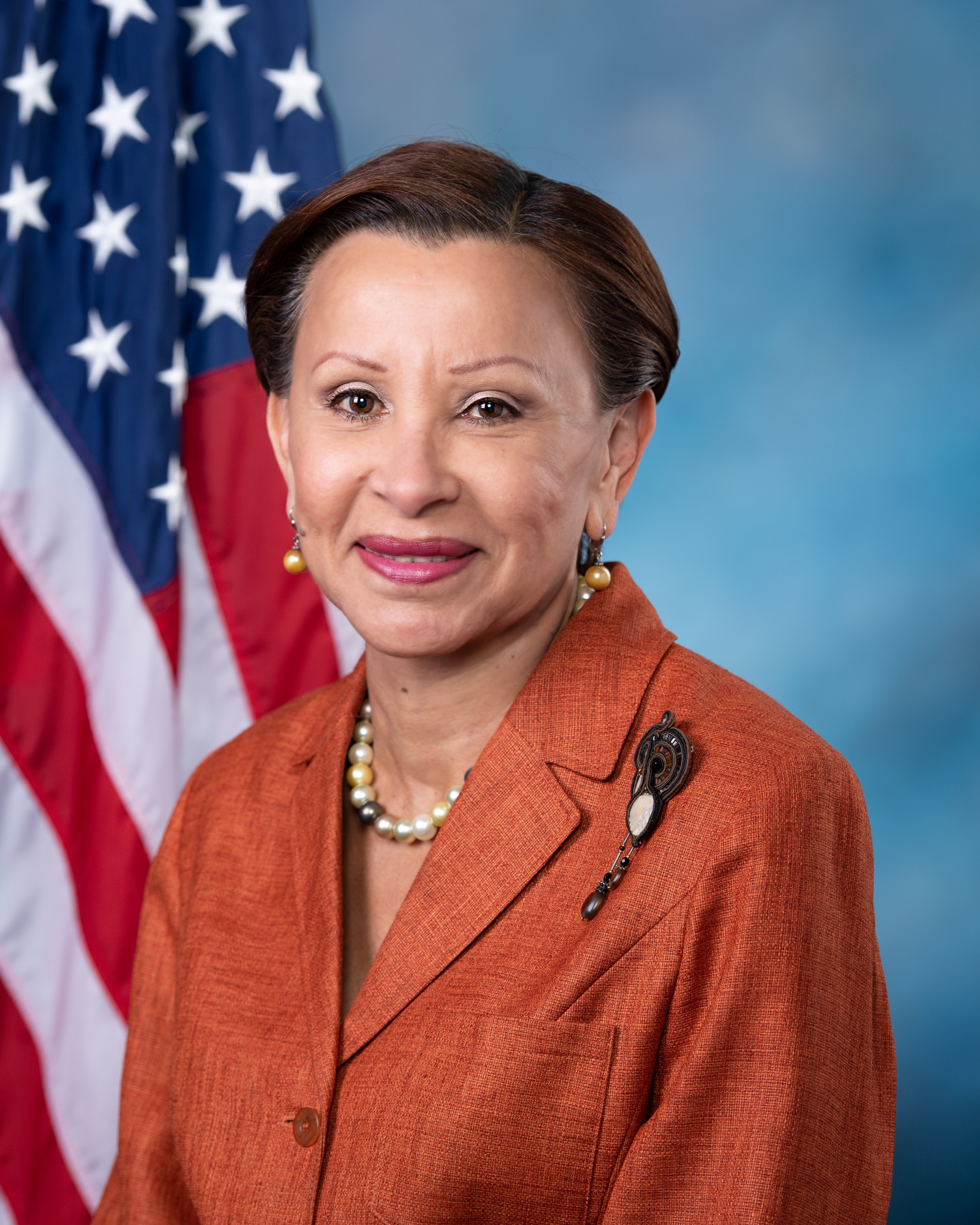
Official portrait, 2018.

Nydia Velázquez is an American politician from New York who is currently serving in the U.S. House of Representatives since 1993. She served the 12th district from 1993 to 2013, and the 7th district since 2013. Prior to serving in Congress, Velázquez briefly served on the New York City Council from 1984 to 1985.

== U.S. House of Representatives ==
=== 1990s ===
1992 New York's 12th congressional district election
Party	Candidate	Votes	%
Democratic	Nydia Velázquez	55,926	76.5
Republican	Angel Diaz	12,288	16.8
Conservative	Angel Diaz	1,535	2.1
Conservative	Angel Diaz	1,153	1.6
Total	Angel Diaz	14,976	20.5
Liberal	Ruben Franco	1,556	2.1
Natural Law	Rafael Mendez	609	0.8
Total votes		73,067	100.0
Democratic hold			

1994 New York's 12th congressional district election
Primary election
Party	Candidate	Votes	%
Democratic	Nydia Velázquez (incumbent)	13,208	81.7
Democratic	Pedro L. Velázquez	2,949	18.3
Total votes		16,157	100.0
General election
Democratic	Nydia Velázquez (incumbent)	37,322	86.3
Liberal	Nydia Velázquez (incumbent)	2,607	6.0
Total	Nydia Velázquez (incumbent)	39,929	92.3
Conservative	Genevieve R. Brennan	2,747	6.3
PHA Party	Eric Ruano-Melendez	589	1.4
Total votes		43,265	100.0
Democratic hold			

1996 New York's 12th congressional district election
Party	Candidate	Votes	%
Democratic	Nydia Velázquez (incumbent)	58,947	80.6
Liberal	Nydia Velázquez (incumbent)	2,966	4.1
Total	Nydia Velázquez (incumbent)	61,913	84.6
Republican	Miguel I. Prado	7,824	10.7
Conservative	Miguel I. Prado	1,303	1.8
Right to Life	Miguel I. Prado	851	1.1
Total	Miguel I. Prado	9,978	13.6
Socialist Workers	Eleanor Garcia	1,283	1.8
Total votes		73,174	100.0
	Blank/Void/Scattering	27,011	
Democratic hold			

1998 New York's 12th congressional district election
Party	Candidate	Votes	%
Democratic	Nydia Velázquez (incumbent)	53,269	83.6
Republican	Rosemarie Markgraf	7,405	11.6
Conservative	Angel Diaz	1,632	2.6
Liberal	Hector Cortes, Jr.	1,080	1.7
Fusion Party	Hector Henry	320	0.5
Total votes		63,706	100.0
	Blank/Void/Scattering	19,016	
Democratic hold			

=== 2000s ===
2000 New York's 12th congressional district election
Party	Candidate	Votes	%
Democratic	Nydia Velázquez (incumbent)	81,699	82.5
Working Families	Nydia Velázquez (incumbent)	4,589	4.6
Total	Nydia Velázquez (incumbent)	86,288	87.1
Republican	Rosemarie Markgraf	10,052	10.1
Socialist	Paul Pederson	1,025	1.0
Right to Life	Mildred Rosario	865	0.9
Conservative	Caesar Estevez	850	0.9
Total votes		99,080	100.0
	Blank/Void/Scattering	34,980	
Democratic hold			

2002 New York's 12th congressional district election
Party	Candidate	Votes	%
Democratic	Nydia Velázquez (incumbent)	43,809	86.7
Working Families	Nydia Velázquez (incumbent)	4,599	9.1
Total	Nydia Velázquez (incumbent)	48,408	95.8
Conservative	Caesar Estevez	2,119	4.2
Total votes		50,527	100.0
	Blank/Void/Scattering	34,238	
Democratic hold			

2004 New York's 12th congressional district election
Party	Candidate	Votes	%
Democratic	Nydia Velázquez (incumbent)	100,402	80.3
Working Families	Nydia Velázquez (incumbent)	7,394	5.9
Total	Nydia Velázquez (incumbent)	107,796	86.3
Republican	Paul A. Rodriguez	15,697	12.6
Conservative	Paul A. Rodriguez	1,469	1.2
Total	Paul A. Rodriguez	17,166	13.7
Total votes		124,962	100.0
	Blank/Void/Scattering	38,382	
Democratic hold			

2006 New York's 12th congressional district election
Party	Candidate	Votes	%
Democratic	Nydia Velázquez (incumbent)	55,674	79.5
Working Families	Nydia Velázquez (incumbent)	7,173	10.2
Total	Nydia Velázquez (incumbent)	62,847	89.7
Republican	Allan Romaguera	6,143	8.8
Conservative	Allan Romaguera	1,039	1.5
Total	Allan Romaguera	7,182	10.3
Total votes		70,029	100.0
	Blank/Void/Scattering	14,317	
Democratic hold			

2008 New York's 12th congressional district election
Party	Candidate	Votes	%
Democratic	Nydia Velázquez (incumbent)	115,633	84.5
Working Families	Nydia Velázquez (incumbent)	7,420	5.4
Total	Nydia Velázquez (incumbent)	123,053	89.9
Republican	Allan E. Romaguera	12,486	9.1
Conservative	Allan E. Romaguera	1,262	0.9
Total	Allan E. Romaguera	13,748	10.0
Write-in		8	0.0
Total votes		136,809	100.0
	Blank		
Democratic hold			

=== 2010s ===
2010 New York's 12th congressional district election
Party	Candidate	Votes	%
Democratic	Nydia Velázquez (incumbent)	60,586	82.8
Working Families	Nydia Velázquez (incumbent)	8,038	11.0
Total	Nydia Velázquez (incumbent)	68,624	93.8
Conservative	Caesar Estevez	4,482	6.1
Write-in		59	0.1
Total votes		73,165	100.0
	Blank	13,588	
Democratic hold			

2012 New York's 7th congressional district election
Party	Candidate	Votes	%
Democratic	Nydia Velázquez (incumbent)	17,208	57.9
Democratic	Erik Martin Dilan	10,408	35.0
Democratic	Daniel J. O'Connor	1,351	4.5
Democratic	George Martinez	745	2.5
Total votes		29,712	100.0
General election
Democratic	Nydia Velázquez (incumbent)	134,802	88.6
Working Families	Nydia Velázquez (incumbent)	9,128	6.0
Total	Nydia Velázquez (incumbent)	143,930	94.6
Conservative	James Murray	7,971	5.2
Write-in		210	0.1
Total votes		152,111	100.0
	Blank	29,855	
Democratic hold			

2014 New York's 7th congressional district election
Party	Candidate	Votes	%
Democratic	Nydia Velázquez (incumbent)	7,627	80.9
Democratic	Jeffrey M. Kurzon	1,796	19.1
Total votes		9,423	100.0
General election
Democratic	Nydia Velázquez (incumbent)	47,142	73.9
Working Families	Nydia Velázquez (incumbent)	9,451	14.8
Total	Nydia Velázquez (incumbent)	56,593	88.7
Republican	Jose Luis Fernandez	5,713	9.0
Conservative	Allan E. Romaguera	1,398	2.2
Write-in		108	0.2
Total votes		63,812	100.0
	Blank	4,710	
Democratic hold			

2016 New York's 7th congressional district election
Party	Candidate	Votes	%
Democratic	Nydia Velázquez (incumbent)	10,162	62.1
Democratic	Yungman F. Lee	4,479	27.3
Democratic	Jeffrey M. Kurzon	1,736	10.6
Total votes		16,377	100.0
General election
Democratic	Nydia Velázquez (incumbent)	165,819	87.3
We The People	Nydia Velázquez (incumbent)	6,327	3.3
Total	Nydia Velázquez (incumbent)	172,146	90.7
Republican	Allan E. Romaguera	14,941	7.9
Conservative	Allan E. Romaguera	2,537	1.3
Total	Allan E. Romaguera	17,478	9.2
Write-in		266	0.1
Total votes		189,890	100.0
	Blank	17,093	
Democratic hold			

2018 New York's 7th congressional district election
Party	Candidate	Votes	%
Democratic	Nydia Velázquez (incumbent)	134,125	85.3
Working Families	Nydia Velázquez (incumbent)	12,562	8.0
Total	Nydia Velázquez (incumbent)	146,687	93.3
Conservative	Joseph Lieberman	8,670	5.5
Reform	Jeffrey M. Kurzon	1,740	1.1
Write-in		205	0.1
Total votes		157,302	100.0
	Blank	7,533	
Democratic hold			

=== 2020s ===
2020 New York's 7th congressional district election
Party	Candidate	Votes	%
Democratic	Nydia Velázquez (incumbent)	56,139	79.8
Democratic	Paperboy Love Prince	13,946	19.8
Write-in		296	0.4
Total votes		70,381	100.0
	Blank/Void	5,190	
General election
Democratic	Nydia Velázquez (incumbent)	156,889	69.6
Working Families	Nydia Velázquez (incumbent)	34,184	15.2
Total	Nydia Velázquez (incumbent)	191,073	84.8
Republican	Brian W. Kelly	29,404	13.0
Conservative	Brian W. Kelly	3,116	1.4
Total	Brian W. Kelly	32,520	14.4
Libertarian	Gilbert Midonnet	1,522	0.7
Write-in		338	0.1
Total votes		225,453	100.0
	Blank/Void	9,716	
Democratic hold			

2022 New York's 7th congressional district election
Party	Candidate	Votes	%
Democratic	Nydia Velázquez (incumbent)	95,645	64.5
Working Families	Nydia Velázquez (incumbent)	23,828	16.1
Total	Nydia Velázquez (incumbent)	119,473	80.6
Republican	Juan Pagan	26,351	17.8
Conservative	Juan Pagan	2,246	1.5
Total	Juan Pagan	28,597	19.3
Write-in		234	0.2
Total votes		148,304	100.0
	Blank	5,253	
Democratic hold			

2024 New York's 7th congressional district election
Party	Candidate	Votes	%
Democratic	Nydia Velázquez (incumbent)	145,141	65.4
Working Families	Nydia Velázquez (incumbent)	27,654	12.5
Total	Nydia Velázquez (incumbent)	172,795	77.9
Republican	Juan Pagan	43,052	19.4
Conservative	Juan Pagan	5,383	2.4
Total	Juan Pagan	48,435	21.8
Write-in		549	0.2
Total votes		221,779	100.0
	Blank	15,556	
Democratic hold			
