= South Williamsburg, Brooklyn =

South Williamsburg Los Sures (Latino section), Southside
- Neighborhood
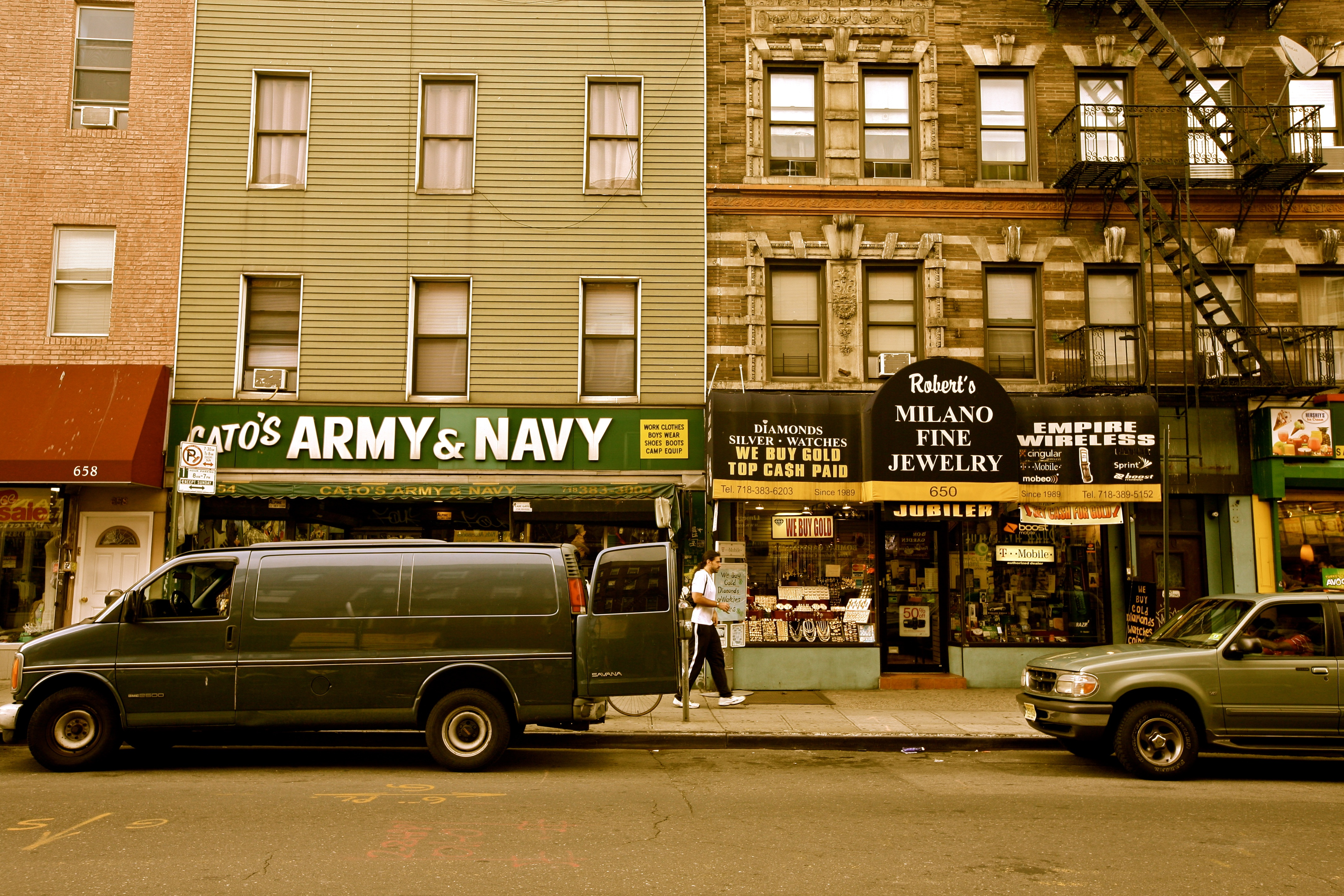
- A photo of Chymer street in South Williamsburg, taken in 2011.
- Nickname: Los Sures (Southside)
- Location in New York City
- Coordinates: 40°42′18″N 73°57′30″W
- Country: United States
- State: New York
- City: New York City
- Borough: Brooklyn
- Community District: Brooklyn CD 1
- Settled: 1827 (as part of Williamsburgh)
- Named for: Jonathan Williams

Government
  - Council District: 33rd

Population (2020 estimate)
  - Total: 47,065

Ethnicity
  - White: 86.3%
  - Hispanic: 8.4%
  - Asian: 0.5%
  - Black: 3.3%
  - Non-white: 13.7%
- Time zone: UTC-5 (EST)
  - Summer (DST): UTC-4 (EDT)
- ZIP Codes: 11206, 11211
- Area code: 718/347/929
- Police precinct: 90th
- Fire battalion: 35
- Fire companies: Engine 211/Ladder 119; Engine 216/Ladder 108

South Williamsburg is a neighborhood in the northern portion of the New York City borough of Brooklyn. It is generally bounded by Division Avenue to the north, Broadway to the northeast, Flushing Avenue to the south, and the East River to the west. The neighborhood is part of Brooklyn Community District 1 and is served by the 90th Precinct of the New York City Police Department.

South Williamsburg is known for its large Hasidic Jewish population, particularly adherents of the Satmar dynasty, who settled in the area following World War II. The neighborhood is also home to a significant Latino community, predominantly Puerto Rican and Dominican, concentrated in the area known as Los Sures. Since the 2005 rezoning of the Greenpoint-Williamsburg waterfront, the neighborhood has experienced rapid gentrification and demographic change. Politically, it is represented by the New York City Council's 33rd District.

== History ==
=== Indigenous peoples and colonial period ===
Before European colonization, the land comprising present-day South Williamsburg formed part of the ancestral territory of the Canarsie and Lenape peoples. When the Village of Williamsburg annexed a portion of the Town of Bushwick in 1835, it was organized into three districts; the first district was commonly called the "South Side," a designation that has persisted.

=== Nineteenth and early twentieth century development ===
During the mid-nineteenth century, the waterfront developed into a major industrial zone. The Havemeyer & Elder Sugar Refinery, later known as the Domino Sugar Refinery, opened in 1856 and grew to become the largest sugar-refining facility in the world. By 1870, Williamsburg produced a majority of the sugar consumed in the United States. German chemist Charles Pfizer founded Pfizer Pharmaceuticals in Williamsburg in 1849 and the company maintained an industrial plant in the neighborhood through 2007.

The neighborhood's population during this period consisted primarily of German and Irish immigrants, followed by waves of Italian, Polish, and Eastern European Jewish arrivals. By the 1890s, South Williamsburg had become a major center of Eastern European Jewish immigration.

=== Post-World War II demographic shifts ===
Following World War II, South Williamsburg experienced profound demographic transformation. Williamsburg had already developed a substantial Orthodox Jewish population in the decades after the Williamsburg Bridge opened, as religious Jews sought to escape the overcrowded Lower East Side while remaining close to established synagogues and kosher commerce.

This existing infrastructure made the area south of Division Avenue attractive to the thousands of Hasidic Jews, many of them Holocaust survivors from Hungary and Romania, who settled there beginning in the late 1940s. Rabbi Joel Teitelbaum of the Satmar Hasidic dynasty arrived in the United States in 1947 and established Congregation Yetev Lev in 1948, building what would become one of the largest ultra-Orthodox Jewish communities in the United States. Under his leadership, the Satmar community revitalized abandoned housing stock and constructed yeshivas, mikvahs, and synagogues throughout the 1950s and 1960s.

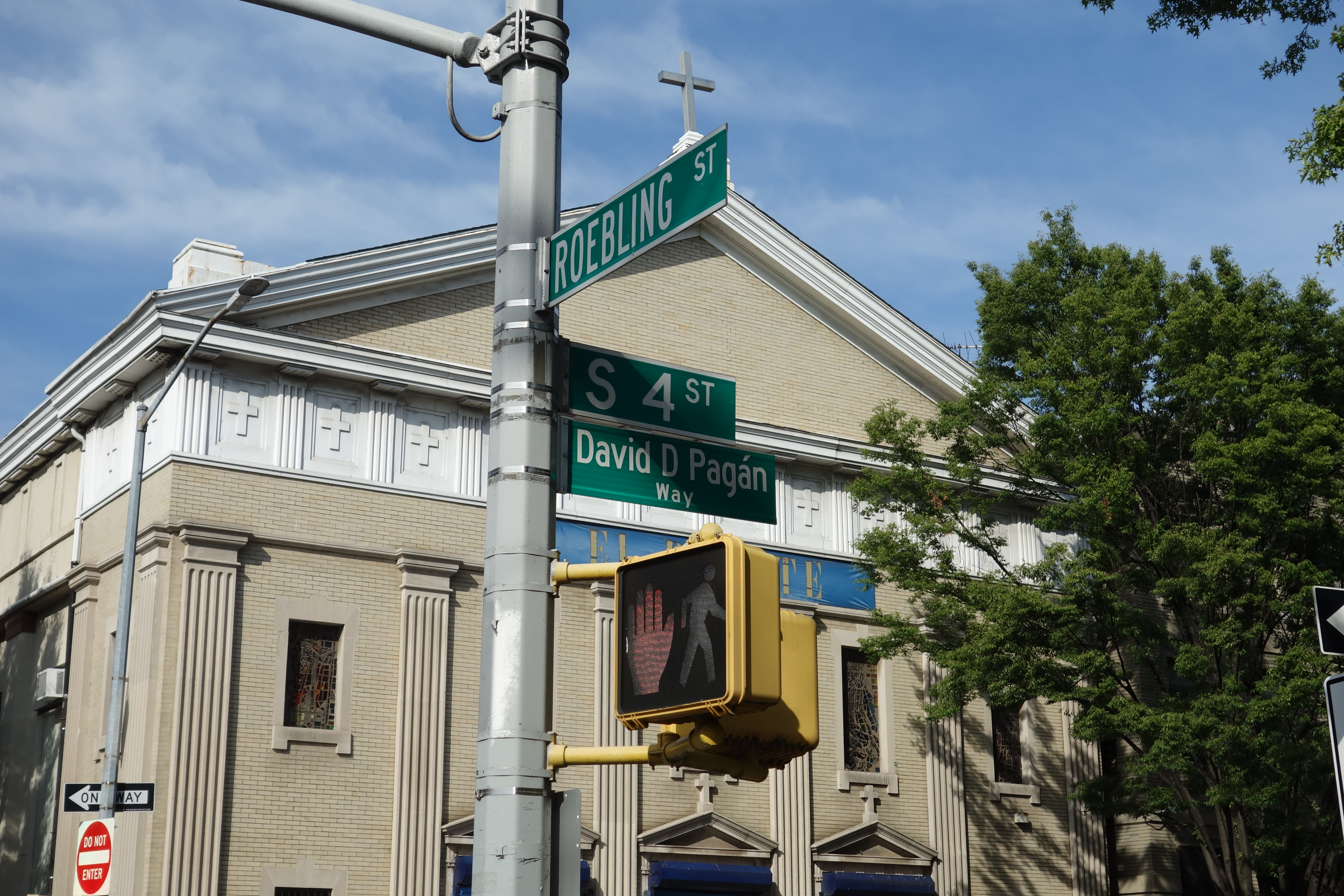
South 4th Street is named David D. Pagan Way after Pagan, the first executive director of Southside United H.D.F.C Los Sures.

Simultaneously, Puerto Rican migrants began arriving in large numbers during the postwar decades in what became known as the "Great Migration." By 1954, the New York City Youth Board reported that Puerto Ricans had established significant concentrations in South Williamsburg, representing a shift from earlier settlement patterns concentrated in Upper Manhattan. The Brooklyn Navy Yard's labor demands drew many Puerto Ricans to nearby Williamsburg in the 1940s and 1950s, and Graham Avenue became such a center of Puerto Rican life that it earned the nickname "Avenue of Puerto Rico." These newcomers settled primarily in the area south of Grand Street that would become known as Los Sures.

=== Urban decline and community organizing ===
By the 1980s, an estimated 20,000 Puerto Ricans lived in the Southside neighborhood. The deindustrialization of the mid-twentieth century devastated South Williamsburg's Puerto Rican and Latino community. Manufacturing jobs disappeared as factories closed or relocated, and by the 1970s and 1980s, the neighborhood suffered from widespread poverty, abandoned buildings, fires, and rising crime. The Hasidic community experienced these decades differently. Having arrived after World War II when manufacturing was already beginning to decline, the community's economy had developed around serving its own religious and communal needs rather than industrial employment. Synagogues, yeshivas, and religious institutions provided an organizing structure that helped maintain social cohesion during the broader neighborhood's turmoil. The Hasidic community established the United Jewish Organizations of Williamsburg (UJO) in 1966 to provide social services to Holocaust survivors and newly arrived refugees.

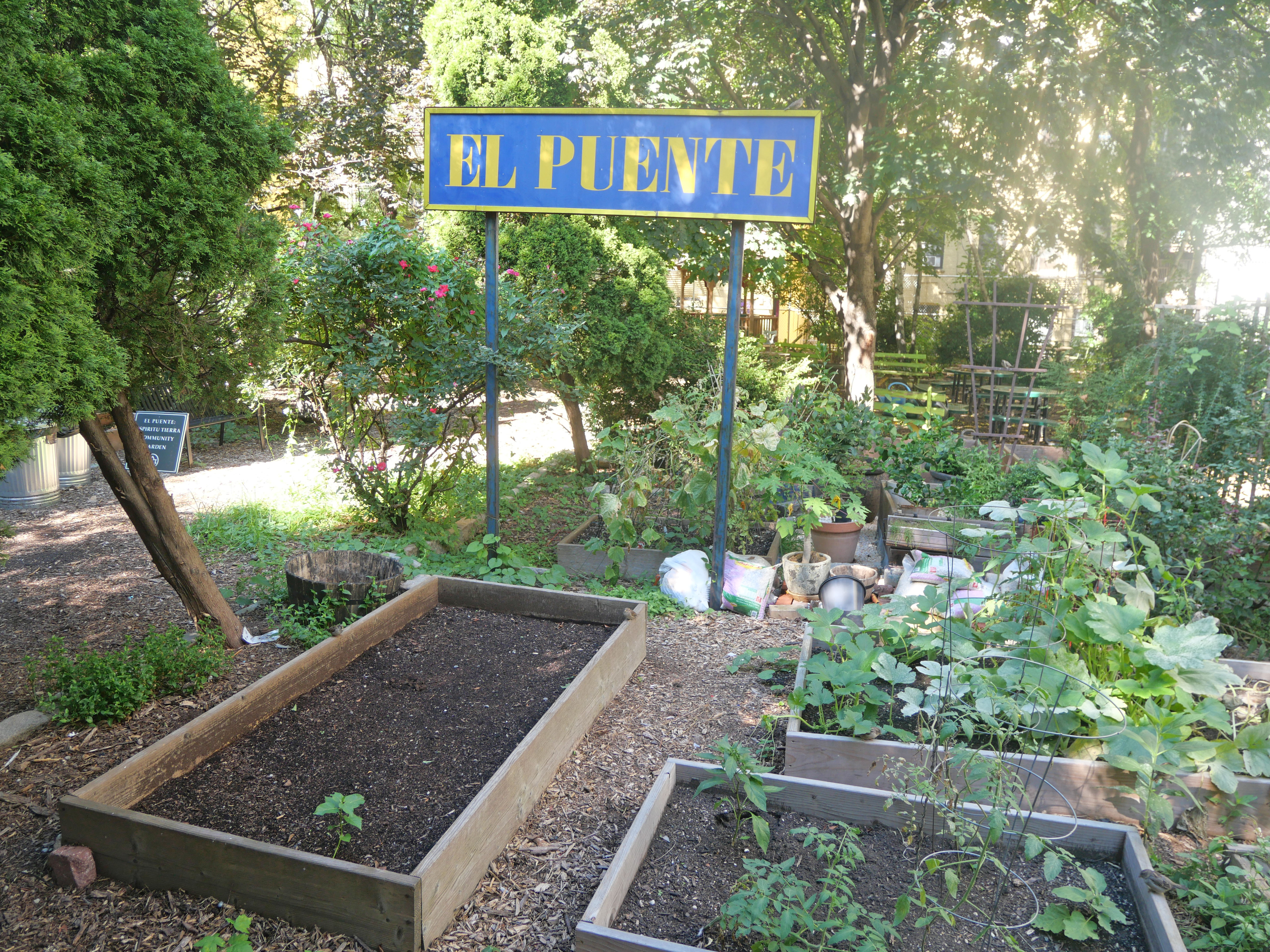
El Puente's community garden on South 2nd Street, between Roebling and Driggs Avenue

Latino residents organized to address deteriorating conditions. In 1972, Puerto Rican and Latino residents established Southside United HDFC, commonly known as Los Sures, which became one of New York City's most influential tenant-led housing organizations. Los Sures rehabilitated abandoned buildings, created affordable housing cooperatives, and established cultural centers that preserved the neighborhood's identity. In 1975, it became Brooklyn's first community-based organization to enter agreements to manage city-owned properties. El Puente, founded in 1982 by Luis Garden Acosta, Frances Lucerna, and Gino Maldonado, emerged as another influential community organization. Originally focused on combating gang and drug-related violence, El Puente developed into a human rights organization addressing education, arts, public health, and environmental justice issues affecting the Latino community.

These organizations sometimes collaborated across ethnic lines. Leaders of El Puente and UJO, along with other community nonprofits, created the Williamsburg Neighborhood Based Alliance to investigate housing, daycare, and healthcare issues affecting all residents. This coalition inspired the formation of the Community Alliance for the Environment (CAFÉ), which successfully organized opposition to a proposed 55-story incinerator at the Brooklyn Navy Yard that would have emitted hazardous chemicals into the atmosphere. El Puente's youth environmental group, the Toxic Avengers, campaigned to close Radiac, a radioactive waste facility, in 1992. A 2022 exhibit at El Museo de Los Sures and the Greenpoint Library, "Our Voices Seen and Heard: 50 Years of Protest," commemorated the neighborhood's environmental activism history.

=== Gentrification and zoning changes ===
Beginning in the 1990s and accelerating after 2000, South Williamsburg experienced dramatic change as artists and young professionals settled in the neighborhood. According to the NYU Furman Center, Williamsburg and Greenpoint were the most rapidly gentrifying neighborhoods in New York City between 1990 and 2014, with average rents rising 78.7 percent compared to 22.1 percent citywide. During that period, the Hispanic population fell by 12 percent while the white population grew by 9 percent. The neighborhood's two main communities responded differently to these changes. The Hasidic community viewed the influx of secular residents as a threat to their religious way of life and community cohesion. Latino organizations fought displacement through tenant advocacy, affordable housing development, and legal challenges. Despite opposition from both communities, the New York City Council approved the Greenpoint-Williamsburg rezoning on May 11, 2005, converting 175 blocks to permit high-density residential development. The rezoning's demographic impact proved significant. Housing advocates documented that the Latino population declined by 27 percent while the white population increased by 44 percent in the years following the rezoning.

== Geography ==
South Williamsburg occupies a compressed geography between the waterfront along Kent Avenue and the elevated tracks of the BMT Jamaica Line along Broadway. New York City considers South Williamsburg an environmental justice area due to disproportionate environmental burdens, including the Brooklyn-Queens Expressway which bisects the neighborhood.

== Demographics ==
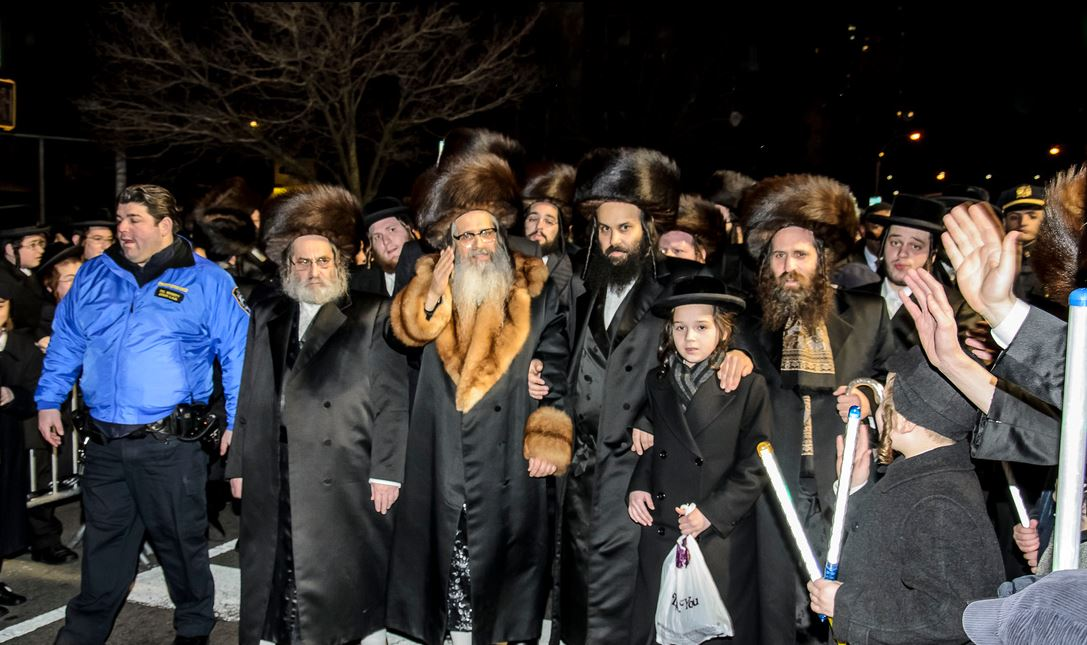
Rabbi Zalman Leib Teitelbaum of Satmar during an escort on the streets of Williamsburg

=== Hasidic community ===
The Hasidic community of South Williamsburg is centered along Lee Avenue and Bedford Avenue south of Division Avenue. A 2023 community study by UJA Federation found that Williamsburg is home to 36,000 Jewish adults and 32,000 Jewish children in 21,000 households. The community is predominantly affiliated with the Satmar Hasidic dynasty and is characterized by strict religious observance, Yiddish as the primary language, distinctive traditional dress, and comprehensive religious education. Following the death of Rabbi Moses Teitelbaum in 2006, the Satmar dynasty split into two factions led by his sons, Rabbis Aaron and Zalman Leib Teitelbaum.

=== Latino community ===
The Latino community, known locally as Los Sures (Spanish for "the Souths"), is concentrated between Grand Street and the Williamsburg Bridge. The community is predominantly Puerto Rican, with significant Dominican and Mexican populations.

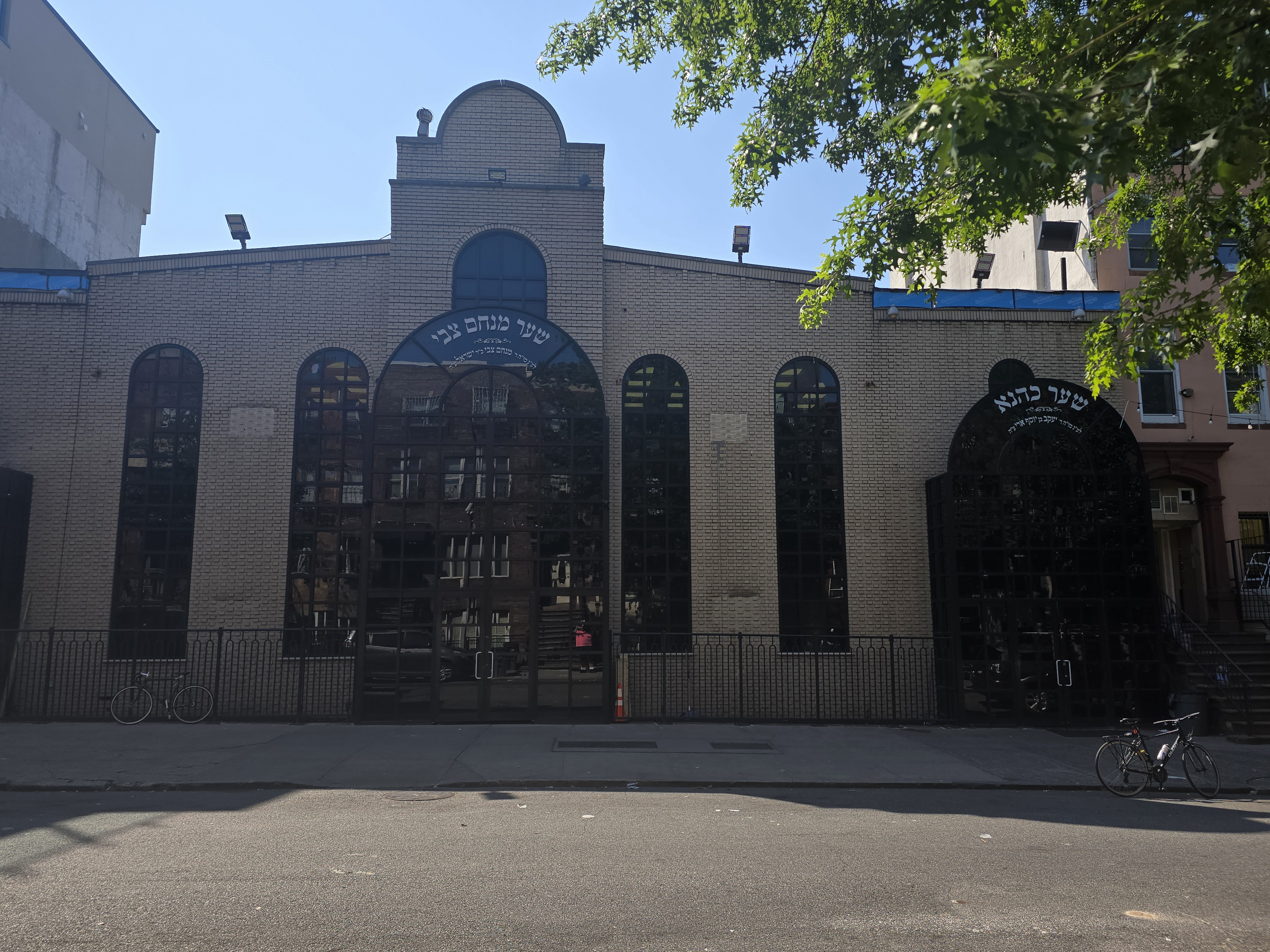
Congregation Yetev Lev D'satmar on Rodney Street

== Landmarks ==
=== Religious and community institutions ===
Congregation Yetev Lev D'Satmar is the main synagogue for followers of Rabbi Zalman Leib Teitelbaum and one of the largest Hasidic synagogues in the United States. The building was constructed to replace the previous main Satmar synagogue on Bedford Avenue, which could no longer accommodate the growing congregation.

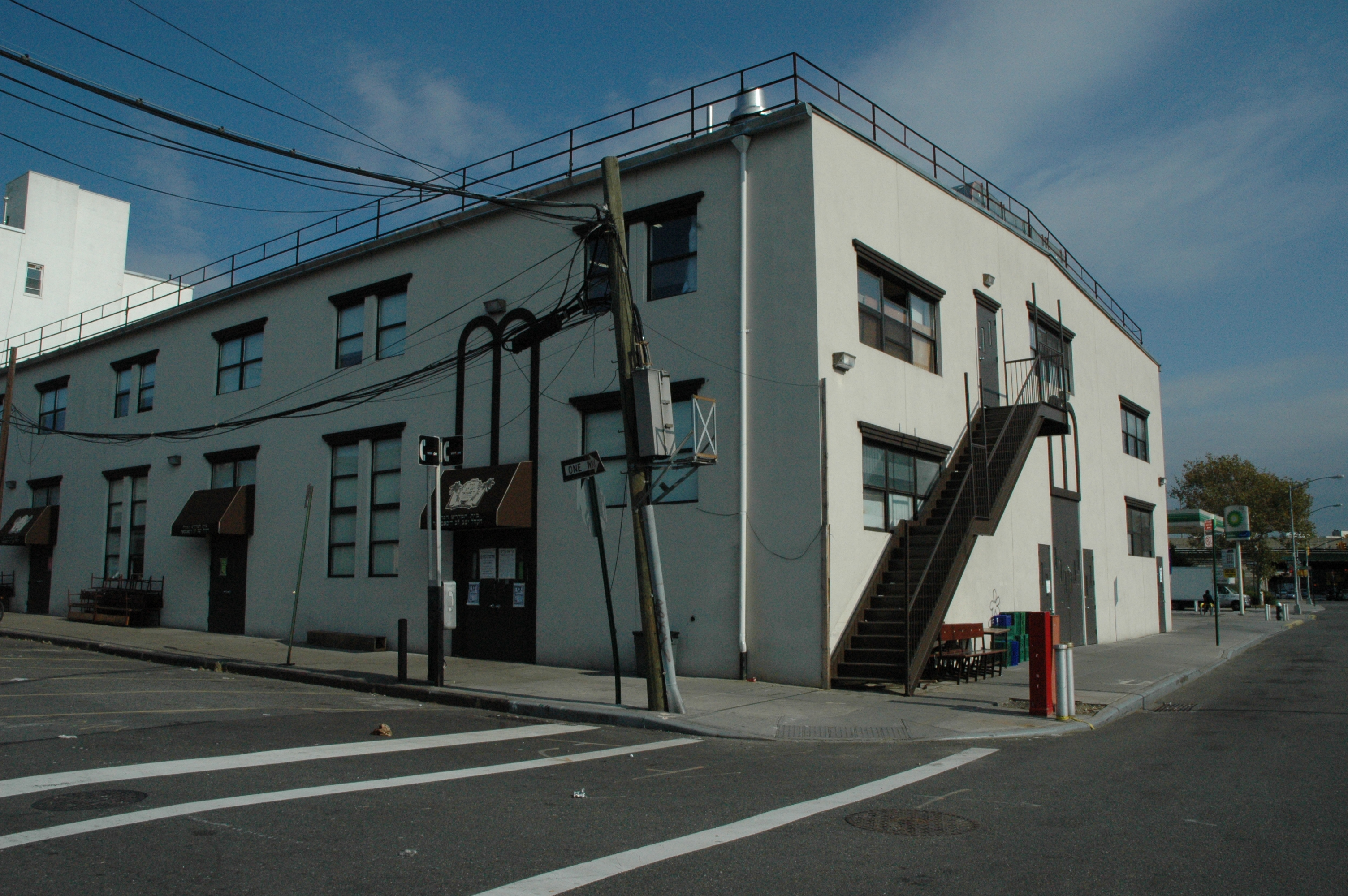
The Yetev Lev D'Satmar synagogue on Hooper Street

A rival Congregation Yetev Lev D'Satmar was constructed at Kent Avenue and Hooper Street in 2006 by followers of Rabbi Aaron Teitelbaum following the succession dispute. The building was completed in approximately two weeks of round-the-clock construction, earning it the nickname "the miracle synagogue."

El Puente, headquartered in a renovated former Catholic church, was founded in 1982 by Luis Garden Acosta, Frances Lucerna, and community activists to address youth violence in Los Sures. The organization operates leadership centers throughout the neighborhood and founded the El Puente Academy for Peace and Justice, the nation's first public high school for human rights, in 1993.

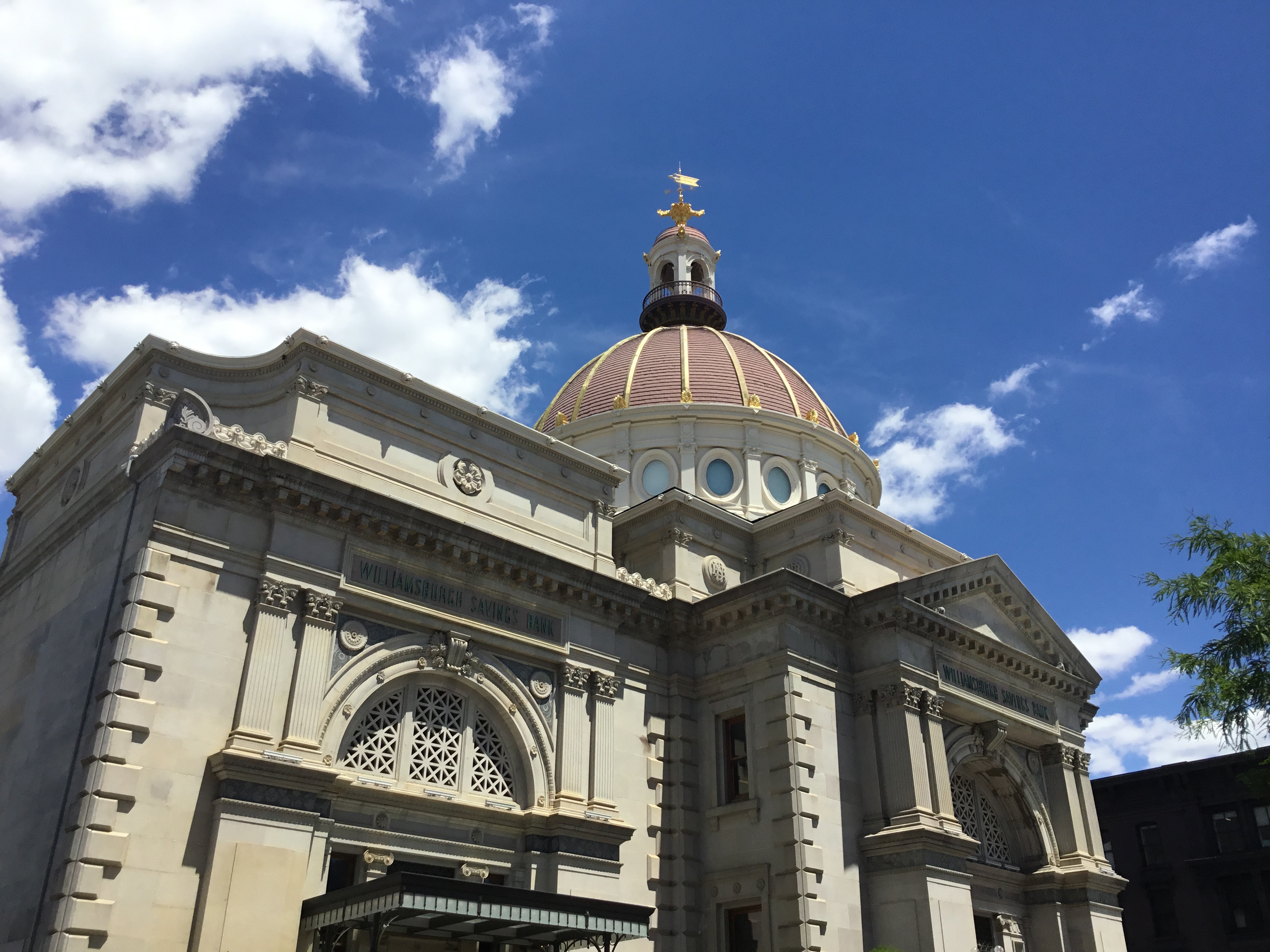
Williamsburgh Savings Bank Building

=== Historic buildings ===
The Williamsburgh Savings Bank Building, designed by George B. Post in 1875, features a distinctive domed roof and Classical Revival architecture. The building served as the bank's headquarters until 1929 and operated as a branch until 2010. It was designated a New York City landmark in 1966 and added to the National Register of Historic Places in 1980. Following restoration, the banking hall reopened as the Weylin event space in 2014.

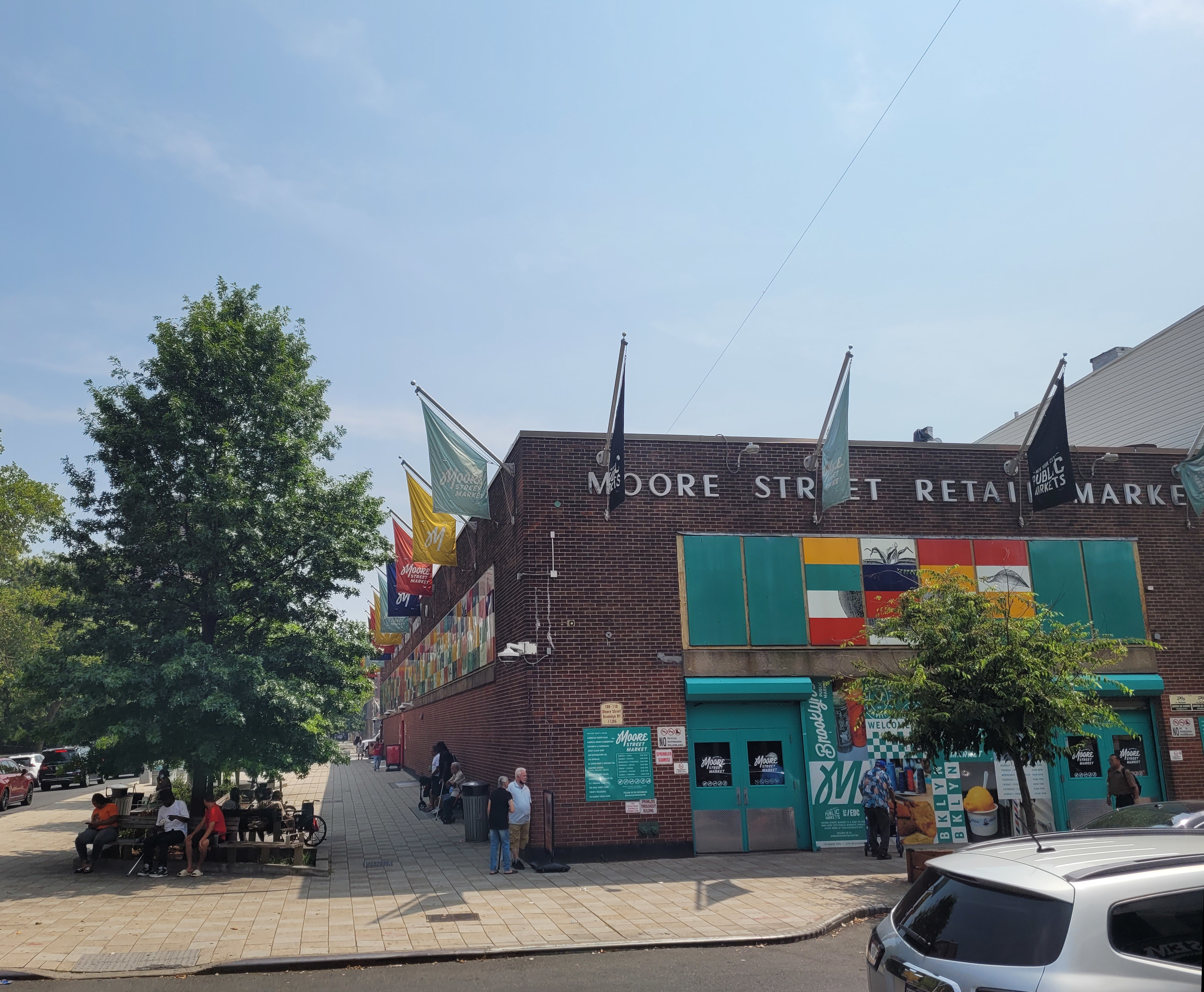
Moore Street Market exterior, as seen from the Moore Street and Humboldt Street entrance

The Williamsburgh Library was the first Carnegie library built in Brooklyn, with its cornerstone laid in 1903. Designed by Richard A. Walker in the Classical Revival style, the 26,000-square-foot building features a floor plan meant to evoke an open book. It was designated a New York City landmark in 1999 and remains one of the largest branches in the Brooklyn Public Library system.

The Moore Street Market, also known as La Marqueta de Williamsburg, opened in 1941 at 110 Moore Street as one of four public markets built by Mayor Fiorello La Guardia. The market houses vendors selling fresh produce, seafood, and specialty foods, and serves as a cultural anchor for the Latino community.

=== Industrial heritage ===
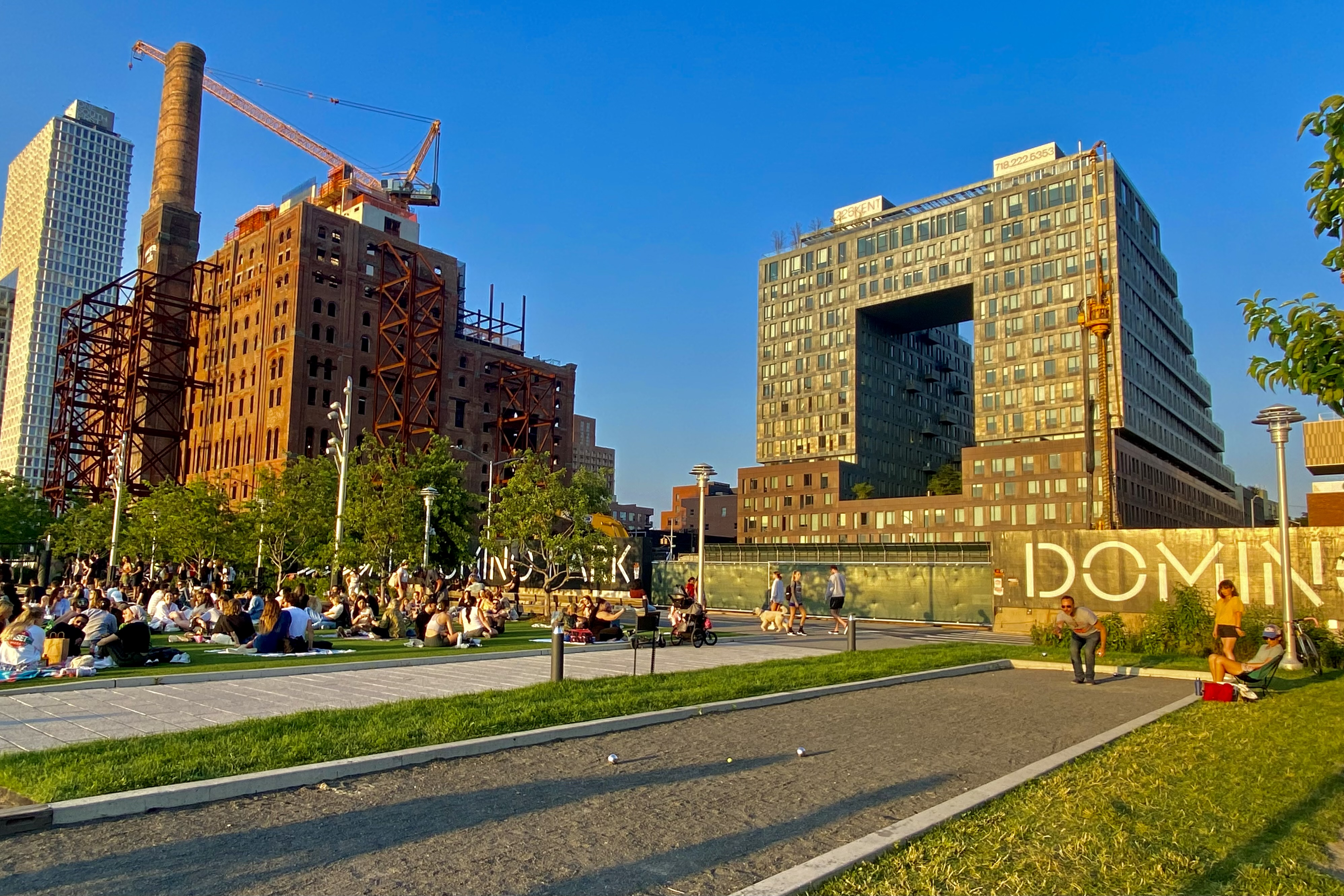
A couple enjoys a game of bocce at Domino Park in Williamsburg, Brooklyn on a June 2022 evening.

The former Domino Sugar Refinery, located at 292 Kent Avenue, operated from 1856 to 2004 and was once the largest sugar refinery in the world. The complex has been redeveloped into a mixed-use development including residential towers and the six-acre Domino Park.

The Williamsburg Houses, completed in 1938, were among the first public housing projects built in the United States under the Public Works Administration. Designed by Richmond Shreve and William Lescaze, the complex was praised for its modernist design and remains in operation as NYCHA housing.

== Popular culture ==
South Williamsburg and its communities have been depicted in numerous works:

- "A Tree Grows in Brooklyn" (1943), Betty Smith's novel set in early twentieth-century Williamsburg, and its 1945 film adaptation directed by Elia Kazan
- "The Chosen" (1967) and "The Promise" (1969), novels by Chaim Potok depicting tensions between Hasidic and Modern Orthodox Jews in mid-century Williamsburg
- "Los Sures" (1984), documentary film by Diego Echeverria chronicling the Puerto Rican community
- "Living Los Sures" (2014), interactive documentary project by UnionDocs expanding on Echeverria's original film
- "A Life Apart: Hasidism in America" (1997), PBS documentary featuring the Williamsburg Hasidic community
- "One of Us" (2017), Netflix documentary about individuals leaving the Hasidic community

== See also ==
- Williamsburg, Brooklyn
- Satmar (Hasidic dynasty)
- Puerto Ricans in New York City
