= Luis Olmedo =

New York politician

Luis A. Olmedo (born 1935) was a New York City Councilman from 1973 to 1984. He represented the Bushwick section of Brooklyn in the city council, as a Democrat.

== Life ==
Luis Olmedo was of Puerto Rican descent. After graduating from college Olmedo was employed in New York City as an anti-poverty worker. He worked as chairman of Los Sures to create, and then headed up the Southside United Housing Development Fund Corporation. He organized a number of protests against the racially biased allocations of public housing.

Olmedo was first elected in 1973 to the New York City Council from the newly redrawn 27th District, which included major portions of the Williamsburg and Bushwick sections of Brooklyn. The district as drawn was predominantly Puerto Rican. Over the course of his decade on th Council, became vice chairman of its Black and Hispanic Caucus, as well as chairman of the Council's Youth Services Committee.

== Corruption charges ==
Council member Olmedo was arrested in 1983, and charged with extorting money from two food production companies. In evidence, it was alleged that he received $12,000 from an undercover investigator. It was alleged that Olmedo and his assistant, Carlos Castellanos, had demanded the $12,000 before approving plans by a Brooklyn fish-processing company to move to a city-owned site in Mr. Olmedo's district. He was tried the following year and convicted in federal court of conspiracy and attempted extortion. Olmedo received a sentence of a year and a day in prison.

Olmedo was automatically expelled from his councilman's seat upon conviction. He was succeeded by Nydia Margarita Velázquez, who was appointment by the Council.
