= Independence Towers =

Independence Towers Independence Houses
- NYCHA Property
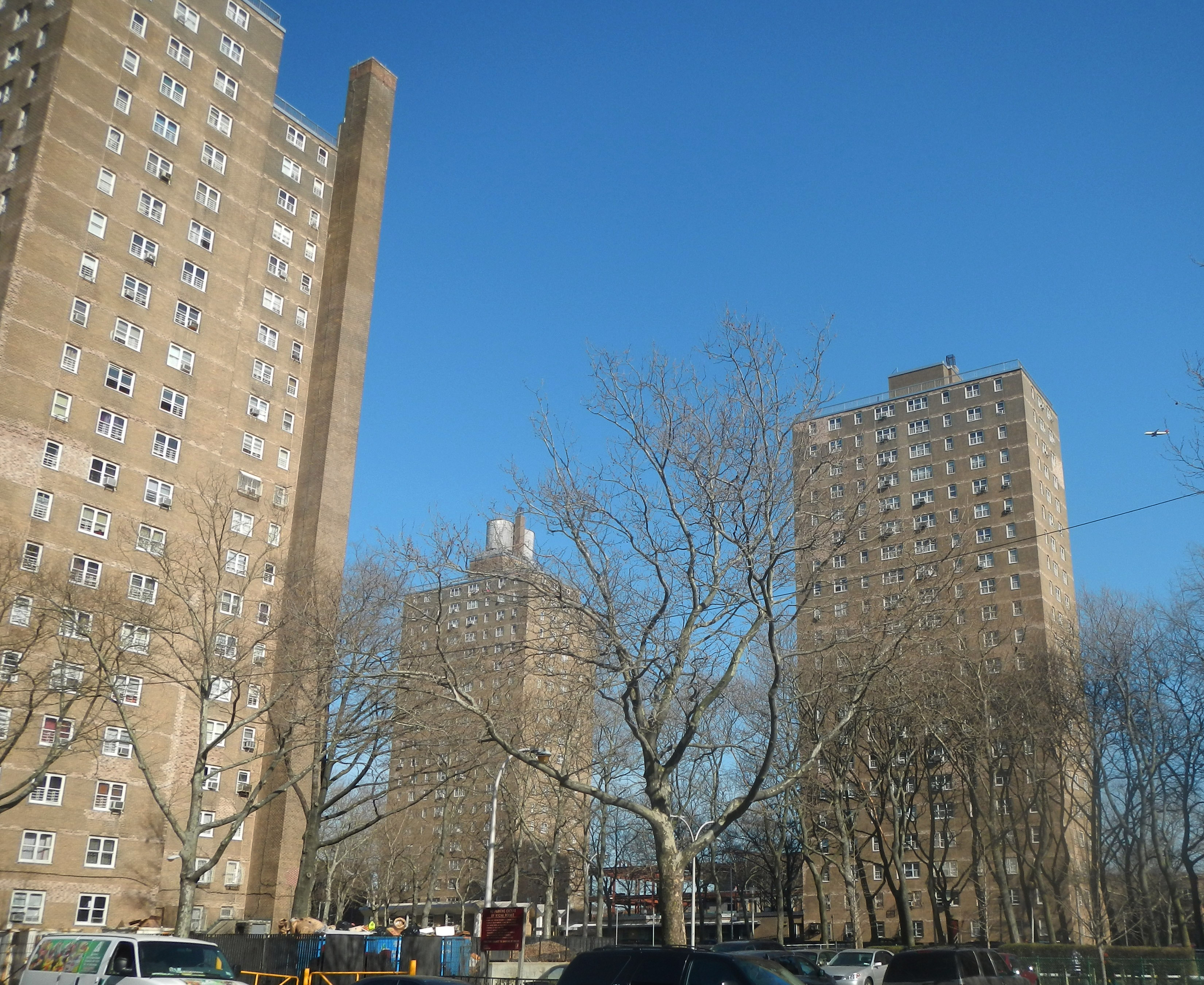
- Interactive map of Independence Towers
- Country: United States
- State: New York
- City: New York City
- Borough: Brooklyn

Area
  - Total: 5.63 acres (2.28 ha)

Population
  - Total: 1,690
- Zip Code: 11249

Independence Towers is a NYCHA housing project that consists of six 21-story buildings. It is located between Clymer to Wilson Streets and also between Wythe Place and Bedford Avenue in South Williamsburg, Brooklyn. Tenants began moving into the housing project in January 1965 and the complex was completed in October of that same year.

== History ==
Originally planned to be called the Bedford-Wilson project, the complex was named Independence Houses because four of the streets abutting the site were named after signers of the Declaration of Independence: George Clymer, George Taylor, James Wilson and George Wythe. Plans for the housing project were initially opposed by religious groups in the surrounding area.

The complex was designed by the architectural firm of Holden, Egan, Wilson & Corser and built by the Wilaka Construction Company.

=== 21st Century ===
In February 2020, the Permanent Affordability Commitment Together (PACT) conversion had started on this project. Announced in 2017, it was to protect the authority's unfunded apartments for 8 different development including this one and that cost NYCHA at least $23M per year and these developments required greater than $1,000,000 in repairing. It also had its boilers and heating equipment replaced and more high-efficiency boilers, new radiators, and temperature controls. The roofs, windows, elevators, doors, and flooring were also renewed.

== See also ==
- New York City Housing Authority
- Taylor–Wythe Houses – another NYCHA housing complex adjacent to the site
