= Puente =

Puente, a word meaning bridge in Spanish language, may refer to:

Punte is a word in Nepali . Its meaning is small .

== People ==
- Puente (surname)

== Places ==
- La Puente, California, USA
- Puente Alto, city and commune of Chile
- Puente de Ixtla, city in Mexico
- Puente Genil, village in the Spanish province of Córdoba
- Puente La Reina, town and municipality located in the autonomous community of Navarra, in northern Spain
- Puente Nacional, Veracruz, municipality in Mexico
- Puente Piedra District, district in Peru
- Puente, Camuy, Puerto Rico, a barrio
- Puentes de García Rodríguez, municipality in Ferrolterra, in northwestern Spain
- West Puente Valley, California, USA

== Bridges and transport ==
- Puente Aranda (TransMilenio), mass-transit system of Bogotá, Colombia
- Puente Centenario, major bridge crossing the Panama Canal
- Puente Colgante, transporter bridge in Spain
- Puente Colgante, a suspension bridge in Manila, Philippines
- Puente de Boyacà, bridge in Colombia
- Puente La Amistad de Taiwán, Taiwan-Costa Rica's Friendship Bridge, in Costa Rica
- Puente de la Mujer, bridge in Buenos Aires, Argentina
- Puente del Alamillo, bridge in Seville, Andalusia, Spain
- Puente de las Américas, bridge in Panama
- Puente de la Unidad, bridge in Mexico
- Puente de Piedra, bridge in Lima, Peru
- Puente de Vizcaya, bridge in Spain
- Puente Internacional Tancredo Neves, bridge in Brazil
- Puente Largo (TransMilenio), mass transit system in Colombia
- Puente Nuevo, bridge in southern Spain
- Puente Viejo, bridge in southern Spain

== Other uses ==
- Puente del Inca, natural arch that forms a bridge, located in Argentina
- Puente Hills, chain of hills in an unincorporated area in eastern Los Angeles County, California, USA
- Puente Hills Mall, located in Industry, California, USA
- Puente (holiday), the day between a holiday and the weekend
- "Puente" (song), by Ricardo Arjona
- "Puente", a song on the album Bocanada by Gustavo Cerati

== See also ==
- El Puente (disambiguation)
