= Nydia Velázquez =

American politician (born 1953)

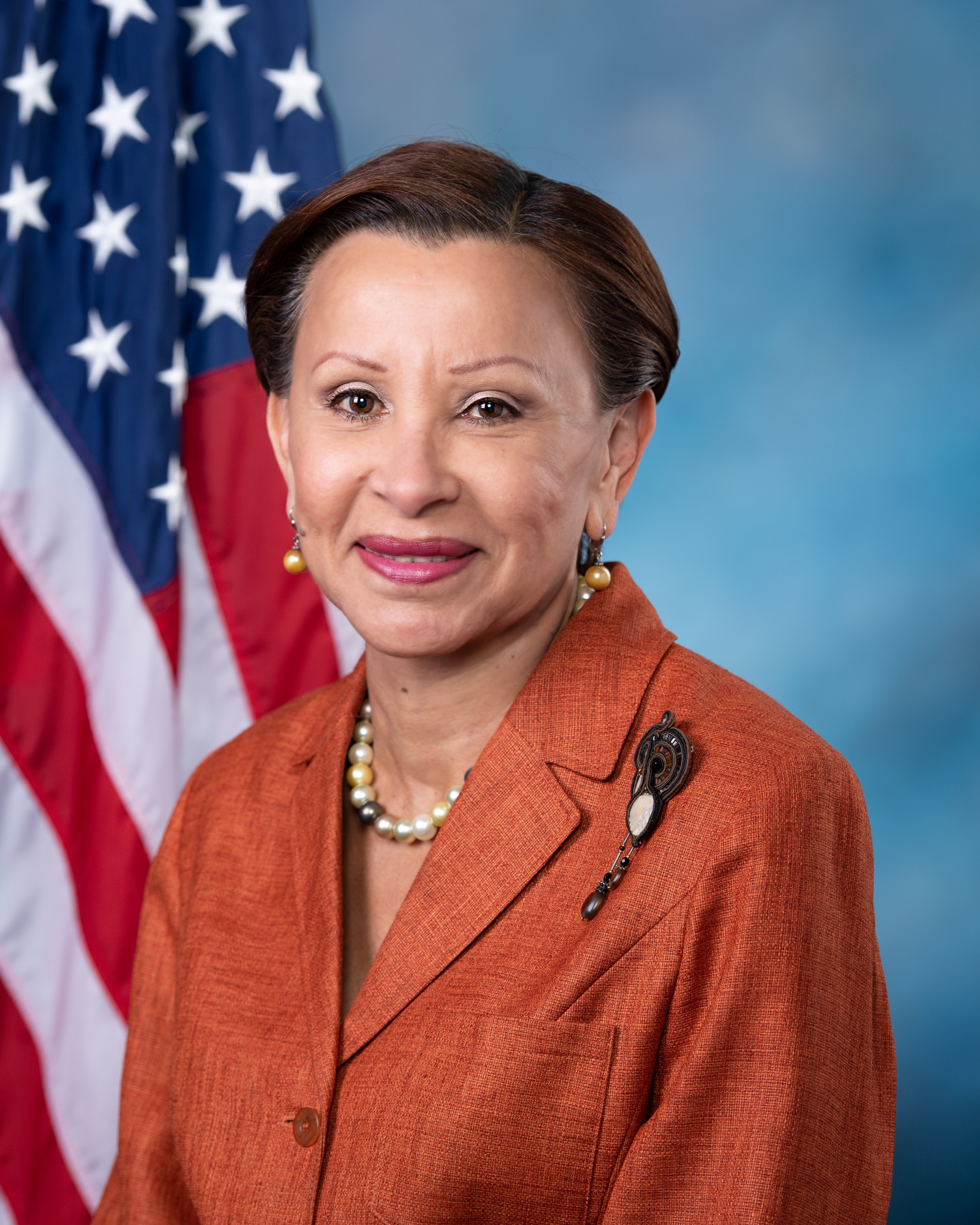
- Official portrait, 2018

Ranking Member of the House Small Business Committee
- Incumbent
- Assumed office January 3, 2023
- Preceded by: Blaine Luetkemeyer
- In office January 3, 2011 – January 3, 2019
- Preceded by: Sam Graves
- Succeeded by: Steve Chabot
- In office February 28, 1998 – January 3, 2007
- Preceded by: John LaFalce
- Succeeded by: Steve Chabot

Chair of the House Small Business Committee
- In office January 3, 2019 – January 3, 2023
- Preceded by: Steve Chabot
- Succeeded by: Roger Williams
- In office January 3, 2007 – January 3, 2011
- Preceded by: Don Manzullo
- Succeeded by: Sam Graves

Member of the U.S. House of Representatives from New York
- Incumbent
- Assumed office January 3, 1993
- Preceded by: Stephen Solarz (redistricted)
- Constituency: 12th district (1993–2013); 7th district (2013–present)

Chair of the Brooklyn Democratic Party
- Acting
- Assumed office September 23, 2026
- Preceded by: Rodneyse Bichotte Hermelyn

Member of the New York City Council from the 27th district
- In office 1984–1985
- Preceded by: Luis Olmedo
- Succeeded by: Victor L. Robles

Personal details
- Born: Nydia Margarita Velázquez; March 28, 1953 (age 73) Yabucoa, Puerto Rico
- Party: Democratic
- Spouse: Paul Bader (m. 2000)
- Education: University of Puerto Rico, Río Piedras (BA); New York University (MA)
- Website: House website Campaign website
- Velázquez's voice Velázquez supporting the Encouraging Small Business Innovation Act of 2019. Recorded January 14, 2019

Nydia Margarita Velázquez Serrano (/ˈnɪdiə/ NID-ee-ə, Spanish: [ˈniðja βeˈlaskes]; born March 28, 1953) is an American politician serving as the U.S. representative for New York's 7th congressional district since 2013. A member of the Democratic Party, she previously represented New York's 12th congressional district from 1993 to 2013, prior to redistricting. She chaired the Congressional Hispanic Caucus from 2009 to 2011. Velázquez is the first Puerto Rican woman to serve in Congress.

On November 20, 2025, Velázquez announced she would not run for re-election in 2026. On September 23, 2026, Velázquez was appointed Chairwoman of the Brooklyn Democratic Party.

== Early life, education and career ==
Velázquez was born in Limones, in the municipality of Yabucoa, Puerto Rico, on March 28, 1953. She grew up in a small house on the Río Limones with eight siblings. Her mother was Carmen Luisa Serrano Medina. Her father, Benito Velázquez Rodríguez, was a low-income sugarcane field worker who became a self-taught political activist and founded a local political party; he was listed as "Black" in the 1940 U.S. census. Political discussions in the Velázquez household often centered on workers' rights.

Velázquez attended public schools and skipped three grades as a child. She became the first person in her family to graduate from high school. At the age of 16, she enrolled at the University of Puerto Rico, Río Piedras Campus. In 1974, she earned a B.A. in political science, graduating magna cum laude, and later worked as a teacher.

While in college, Velázquez supported Puerto Rican independence. By the time she ran for Congress in 1992, she no longer made the issue part of her campaign, stating that Puerto Rico's political status should be decided by the Puerto Rican people. In the 2024 Puerto Rican gubernatorial election, Velázquez was among the public figures who endorsed Juan Dalmau Ramírez of the Puerto Rican Independence Party (PIP) for governor as part of the Alianza de País; Dalmau finished second.

In 1976, Velázquez received an M.A. in political science from New York University. She taught political science at the University of Puerto Rico at Humacao from 1976 to 1981. After returning to New York City, she served as an adjunct professor of Puerto Rican studies at Hunter College from 1981 to 1983.

== Political career ==
In 1983, Velázquez was special assistant to Representative Edolphus Towns, a Democrat representing New York's 10th congressional district in Brooklyn.

In 1984, Howard Golden (then the Brooklyn Borough president and chairman of the Brooklyn Democratic Party) named Velázquez to fill a vacant seat on the New York City Council, making her the first Hispanic woman to serve on the council. Velázquez ran for election to the council in 1986, but lost to a challenger.

From May 1986 to July 1989, Velázquez was national director of the Puerto Rico Department of Labor and Human Resources' Migration Division Office. In 1989 the governor of Puerto Rico named her the director of the Department of Puerto Rican Community Affairs in the United States. In this role, according to a 1992 New York Times profile, "Velazquez solidified her reputation that night as a street-smart and politically savvy woman who understood the value of solidarity and loyalty to other politicians, community leaders and organized labor."

Velázquez pioneered Atrévete Con Tu Voto, a program that aims to politically empower Latinos in the United States through voter registration and other projects. The Atrévete project spread from New York to Hartford, Connecticut; New Jersey; Chicago; and Boston, helping Hispanic candidates secure electoral wins.

=== Puerto Rico ===
Velázquez has been an advocate for human and civil rights of the Puerto Rican people.

In the late 1990s and the 2000s, she was a leader in the Vieques movement, which sought to stop the United States military from using the inhabited island as a bomb testing ground. In May 2000, Velázquez was one of nearly 200 people arrested (including fellow Representative Luis Gutiérrez) for refusing to leave the natural habitat the US military wished to continue using as a bombing range.

Velázquez was ultimately successful: in May 2003, the Atlantic Fleet Weapons Training Facility on Vieques Island was closed, and in May 2004, the U.S. Navy's last remaining base on Puerto Rico, the Roosevelt Roads Naval Station – which employed 1,000 local contractors and contributed $300 million to the local economy – was closed.

== U.S. House of Representatives ==
=== Elections ===
==== 1992 ====
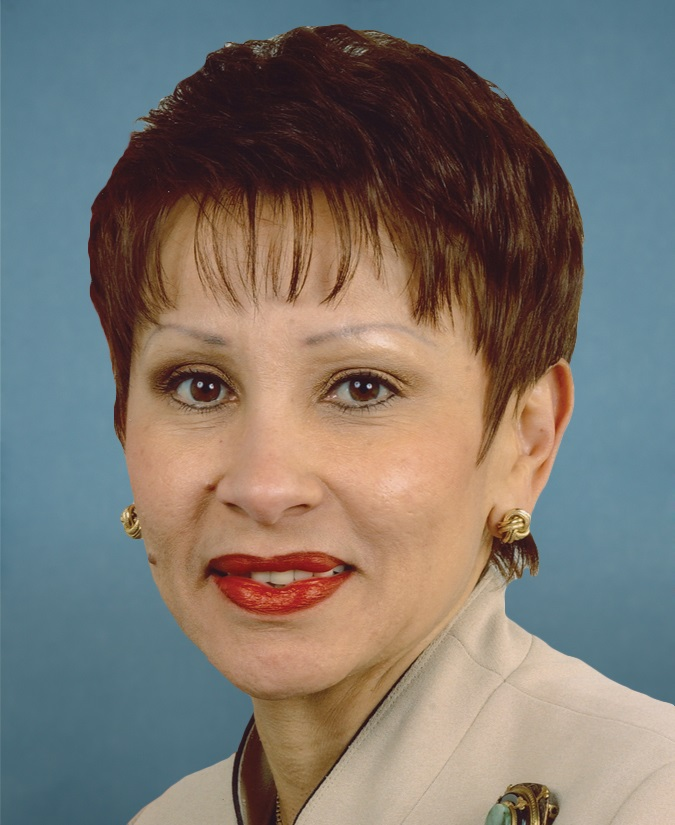
Congresswoman Velázquez's official congressional portrait, 113th Congress

Velázquez ran for Congress in the 1992 election, seeking a seat in the New York's newly drawn 12th congressional district, which was drawn as a majority-Hispanic district. She won the Democratic primary, defeating nine-term incumbent Stephen J. Solarz, who was heavily damaged by the House banking scandal, and four Hispanic candidates.

==== 2010 ====
Velázquez's 2010 campaign income was $759,359. She came out of this campaign about $7,736 in debt. Her top contributors included Goldman Sachs, the American Bankers Association, the National Roofing Contractors Association and the National Telephone Cooperative Association.

==== 2012 ====
Velázquez, who was redistricted into the 7th congressional district, defeated her challengers to win the Democratic nomination. Her top contributors included Goldman Sachs, the American Bankers Association and the Independent Community Bankers of America.

=== Tenure ===
On September 29, 2008, Velázquez voted for the Emergency Economic Stabilization Act of 2008. On November 19, 2008, she was elected by her peers in the Congressional Hispanic Caucus to lead the group in the 111th Congress.

Before removing her name from consideration, she was considered a possible candidate to be appointed to the United States Senate by Governor David Paterson after Senator Hillary Clinton resigned to become secretary of state.

Among Velázquez's firsts are: the first Hispanic woman to serve on the New York City Council; the first Puerto Rican woman to serve in Congress; and the first woman Ranking Democratic Member of the House Small Business Committee in 1998. She became the first woman to chair the United States House Committee on Small Business in January 2007 as well as the first Hispanic woman to chair a House standing committee.

Valazquez voted with President Joe Biden's stated position 100% of the time in the 117th Congress, according to a FiveThirtyEight analysis.

In September 2024, Velázquez presented a federal bill called the "Mel Law," which guarantees posthumous degrees to students who die before completing their mandatory studies.

In April 2024, Velázquez and nearly 20 other congresspeople voted against supplying offensive weapons that could result in killings of civilians to Israel.

=== Committee assignments ===
- Committee on Financial Services
  - Subcommittee on Financial Institutions and Consumer Credit;
  - Subcommittee on Insurance, Housing and Community Opportunity;
- Committee on Small Business (Ranking Member)
- Select Subcommittee on the Coronavirus Crisis

=== Caucus memberships ===
- Black Maternal Health Caucus
- Congressional Equality Caucus
- Congressional Hispanic Caucus
- Congressional Progressive Caucus
- Women's Issues Caucus
- Urban Caucus
- House Baltic Caucus
- Congressional Arts Caucus
- Congressional Asian Pacific American Caucus
- Climate Solutions Caucus
- Medicare for All Caucus
- Blue Collar Caucus
- Rare Disease Caucus
- United States–China Working Group

Velázquez was formerly a member of the Congressional Out of Iraq Caucus.

== Personal life ==
Velázquez, also known as "la luchadora", married Brooklyn-based printer Paul Bader in 2000. It was her second marriage. In November 2002, New York City Comptroller Bill Thompson controversially hired Bader as an administrative manager in the Bureau of Law and Adjudications, joining Joyce Miller, wife of Representative Jerry Nadler, and Chirlane McCray, wife of City Councilman Bill de Blasio. In 2010, Velázquez and Bader were in the process of divorce.

In October 1992, during her first campaign for the House, an unknown person at Saint Clare's Hospital in Manhattan anonymously faxed to the press Velázquez's hospital records pertaining to a suicide attempt in 1991. At a subsequent press conference, Velázquez acknowledged that she had attempted suicide that year while suffering from clinical depression. She said that she underwent counseling and "emerged stronger and more committed to public service." She expressed outrage at the leak of personal health records and asked the Manhattan district attorney and the state attorney general to investigate. Velázquez sued the hospital in 1994, alleging that the hospital had failed to protect her privacy. The lawsuit was settled in 1997.

Velázquez is Catholic.

== See also ==
- List of Puerto Ricans
- History of women in Puerto Rico
- List of Hispanic and Latino Americans in the United States Congress
- Women in the United States House of Representatives

U.S. House of Representatives
| Preceded by Major Owens | Member of the U.S. House of Representatives from New York's 12th congressional district 1993–2013 | Succeeded by Carolyn Maloney |
| Preceded by Don Manzullo | Chair of the House Small Business Committee; 2007–2011 | Succeeded by Sam Graves |
| Preceded by Joe Baca | Chair of the Congressional Hispanic Caucus; 2009–2011 | Succeeded by Charlie Gonzalez |
| Preceded by Joe Crowley | Member of the U.S. House of Representatives from New York's 7th congressional district 2013–present | Incumbent |
| Preceded by Steve Chabot | Chair of the House Small Business Committee; 2019–2023 | Succeeded by Roger Williams |
U.S. order of precedence (ceremonial)
| Preceded by Bobby Scott | United States representatives by seniority 15th | Succeeded by Bennie Thompson |
| Preceded by Bobby Scott | Order of precedence of the United States | Succeeded by Ken Calvert |
