= Los Sures =

Historic neighborhood in Brooklyn, New York

Los Sures is a historic neighborhood in Brooklyn's South Williamsburg that was predominantly Puerto Rican in the 1950s and 1960s. It is between the East River and Union Avenue.

The history of the neighborhood was documented in Diego Echeverria’s 1984 documentary Los Sures and celebrated in 2015 under a broader project called Living Los Sures.
