= Moore Street Retail Market =

Public market in New York City

Coordinates: 40.704°N 73.941°W

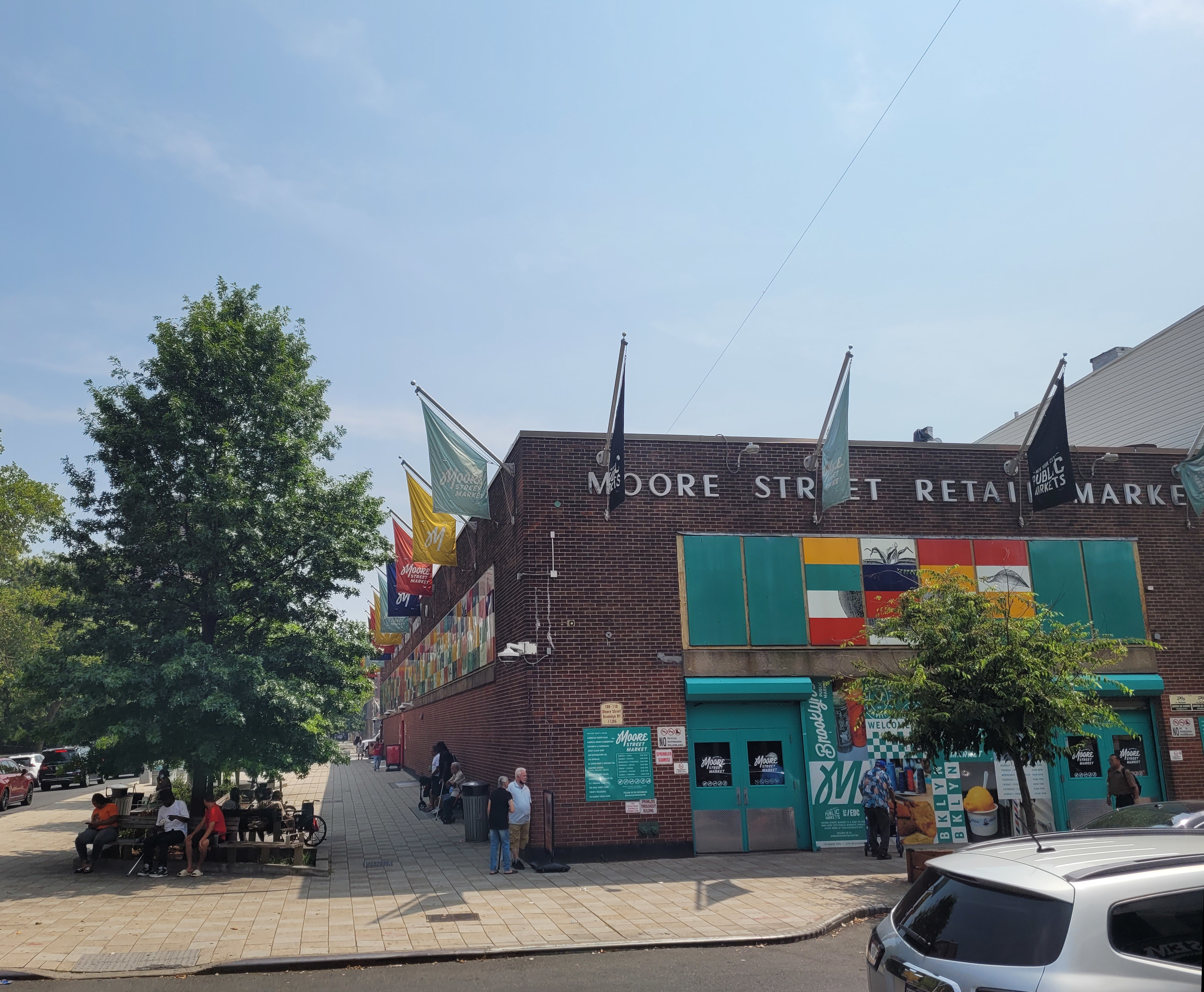
Moore Street Market exterior, as seen from the Moore Street and Humboldt Street entrance

Moore Street Market, also known as La Marqueta de Williamsburg, is one of four surviving public markets built by mayor Fiorello La Guardia in New York City in 1941 to get pushcarts off crowded and unclean streets. It is located at 110 Moore Street in the Williamsburg neighborhood of northern Brooklyn.

In early 2007, Moore Street Market was under the impending threat of closure by its owner and manager, the New York City Economic Development Corporation (NYC EDC). Community leaders and the long-time merchants succeeded in keeping the market open; beginning in December 2008, the market was managed by the Brooklyn Economic Development Corporation, until the New York City Economic Development Corporation was reassigned site management of the market in December 2014. A $2.7 million renovation was announced in 2019.

Merchants operating at the market are mainly from Spanish-speaking Caribbean countries or Latin America, and primarily sell products such as fruit, vegetables, crafts, herbs, candles and ethnic food from their respective countries. The market also serves as an economic and cultural anchor for Williamsburg and its community, regularly holding events for the public.

== Gallery ==
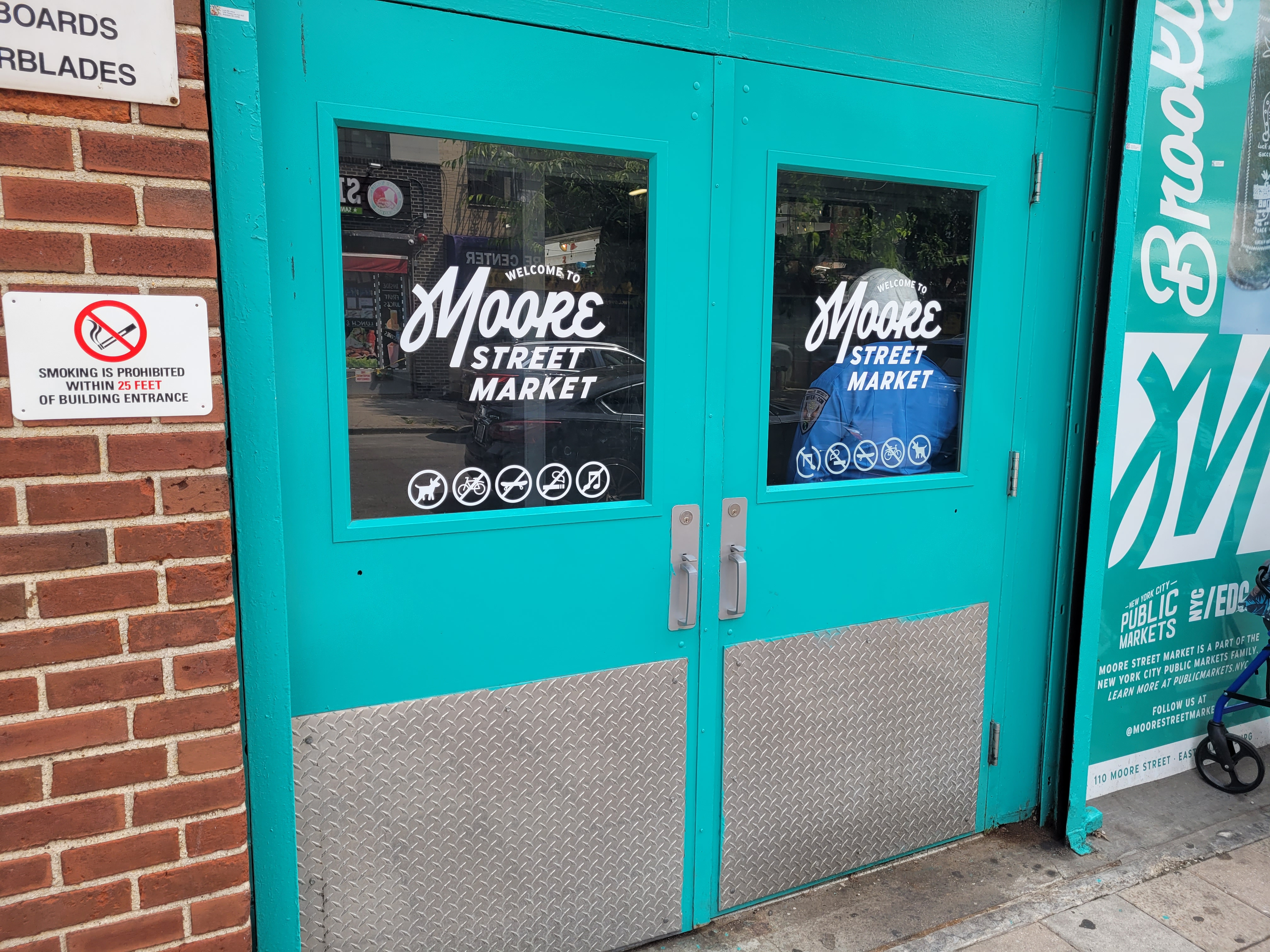
Moore Street entrance

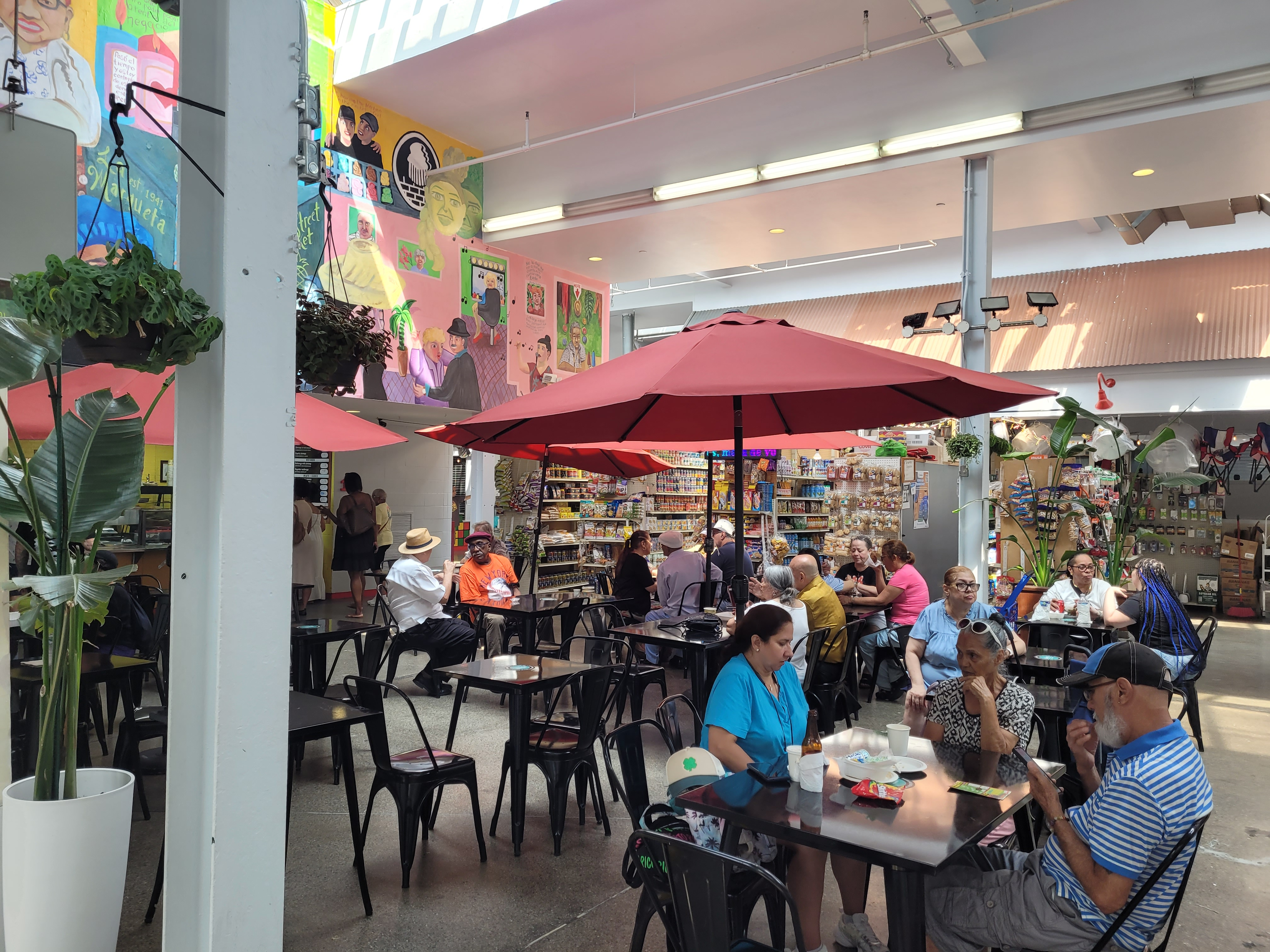
A seating area inside
