= Pope Bridge =

Bridge in Nuevo León, Mexico

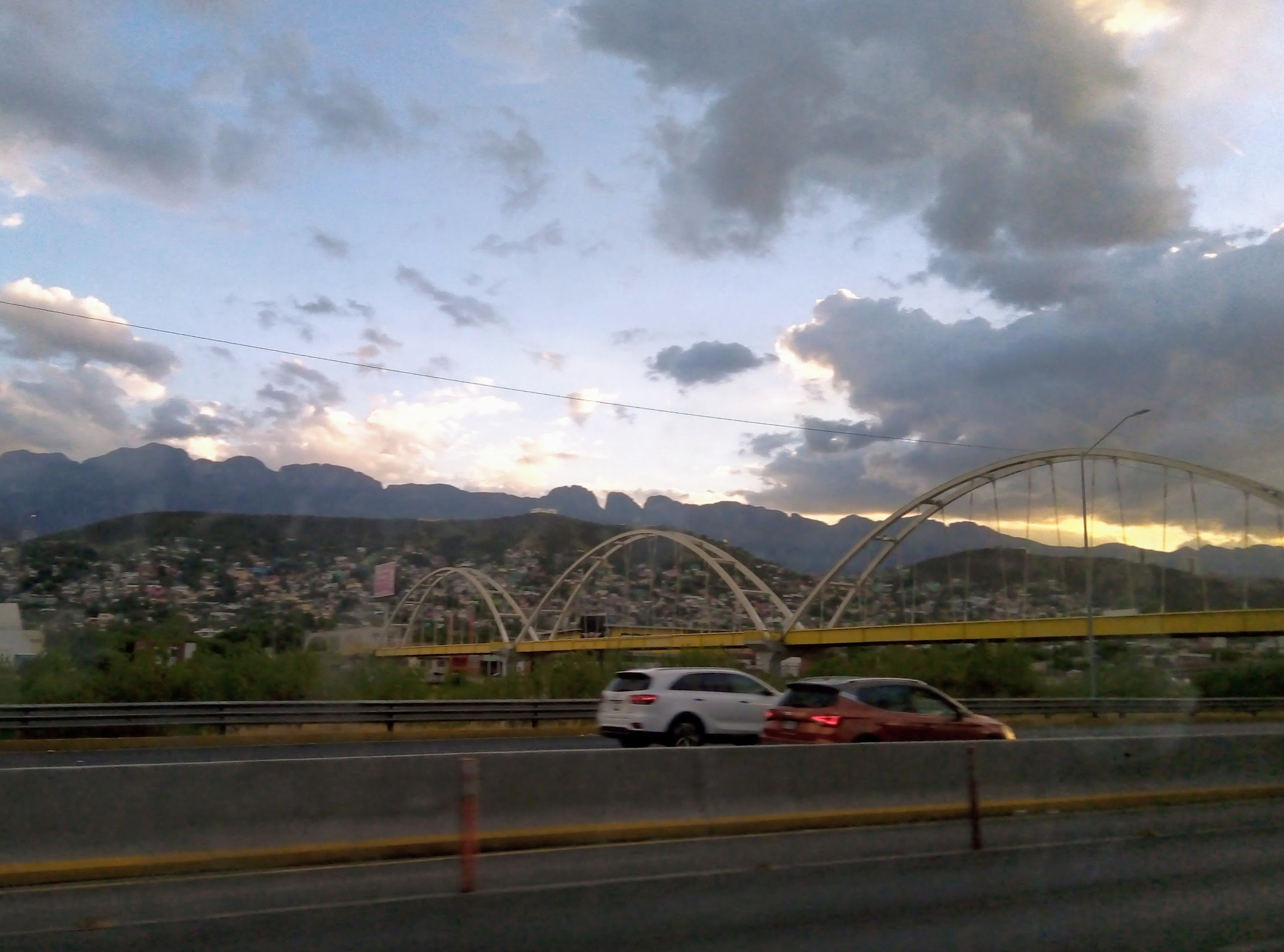
- Coordinates: 25°39′49″N 100°18′58″W
- Locale: Monterrey, Nuevo León, Mexico

The Pope Bridge (Spanish: Puente del Papa) is a bridge located in Monterrey, Nuevo León, Mexico, across the usually dry Río Santa Catarina. It took its name when Pope John Paul II offered a Catholic mass over the bridge.

A flea market by the same name used to install itself under the bridge during weekends, but after hurricane "Alex" struck the city, among many things, there was a shift in the way traffic was directed and the flea market ceased to exist.

Before the Pope John Paul II visited Monterrey, the bridge was called "Puente San Luisito" (St. Little Louis' Bridge), as it connected the "San Luisito" neighborhood, (today, Independencia neighborhood) with Monterrey Downtown, across the Santa Catarina River. The name of "Puente San Luisito" was the name of the bridge for over a century, and in just 20 years, it has been completely forgotten.
