= El Puente Academy for Peace and Justice =

Public school in New York City

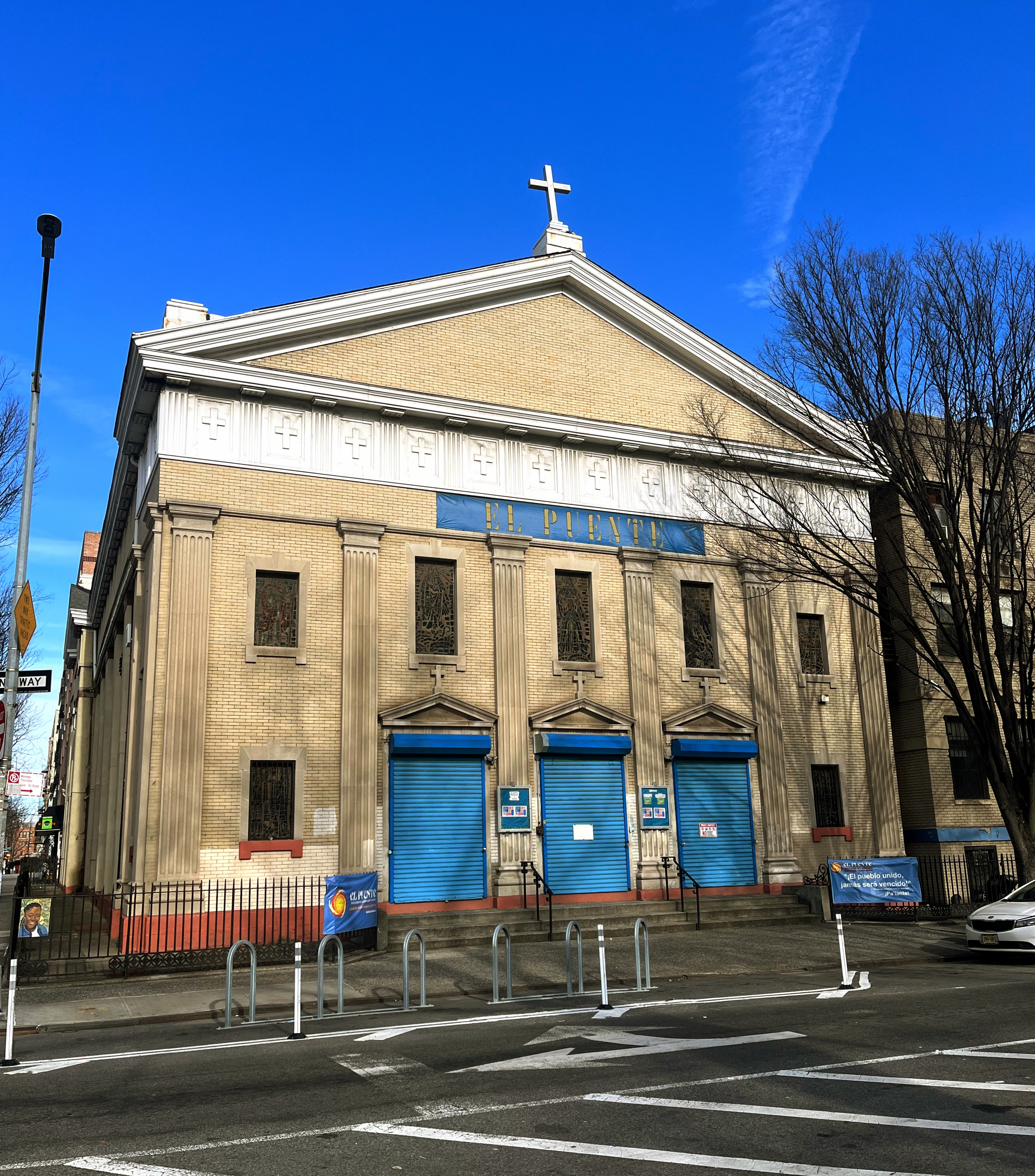
- Original location on South Fourth Street

Location
- 250 Hooper St; Brooklyn, New York 11211; United States; 40.7057°N 73.9556°W

Information
- Type: Alternative Public high school
- Established: 1993
- School district: NYC District #14
- NCES School ID: 360011900892
- Teaching staff: 23.95 (on an FTE basis)
- Grades: 9–12
- Enrollment: 221 (2021–2022)
- Student to teacher ratio: 9.23
- Campus type: Urban
- Website: elpuente.us/el-puente-academy-for-peace-justice

El Puente Academy for Peace and Justice is an alternative public high school in Williamsburg, Brooklyn, New York City. In 1998 it had a mostly Hispanic student body. As of 2012 Wanda Vazquez is the principal.

== History ==
El Puente Academy for Peace and Justice was established as a partnership between the El Puente, a Latino youth development group, and the New York City Board of Education (now the New York City Department of Education) in 1993 with money provided by New Visions for Public Schools, a nonprofit sponsor of alternative schools. It was created to teach social justice and human rights to high school students, training them to become community activists in Williamsburg's predominantly Hispanic South Side. Director of the school Frances Lucerna and leader of El Puente and member of the Young Lords Party Luis Garden-Acosta founded the school in hopes it transforms the community as well. The staff is multicultural with no strict hierarchy and work to connect the classroom with real-life experiences.

The school was originally housed at the South Fourth Street community center until City Department of Education officials ordered it to leave in 2006. The El Puente organization was the first organization authorized by the NYC board of education to own its own public school building and in 2008 moved to the vacant Transfiguration grammar school after the death of the church's long-time pastor.

== Criticism ==
At its founding, critics worried that the school's focus on social justice and human rights might lead to an indoctrination of politics. They feared that students in the Williamsburg area, known for being the city's teen-age gang capital at that time, needed more traditional academic skills for them to succeed.

In 1998, Heather Mac Donald of the City Journal, a publication of the Manhattan Institute think tank, criticized the school's culture and specifically its hip-hop class.

== In popular culture ==
In the 2010 movie It's Kind of a Funny Story, the El Puente Academy for Peace and Justice is lauded as a magnet school for do-gooders.
