= El Puente (coalition) =

American nonprofit organization

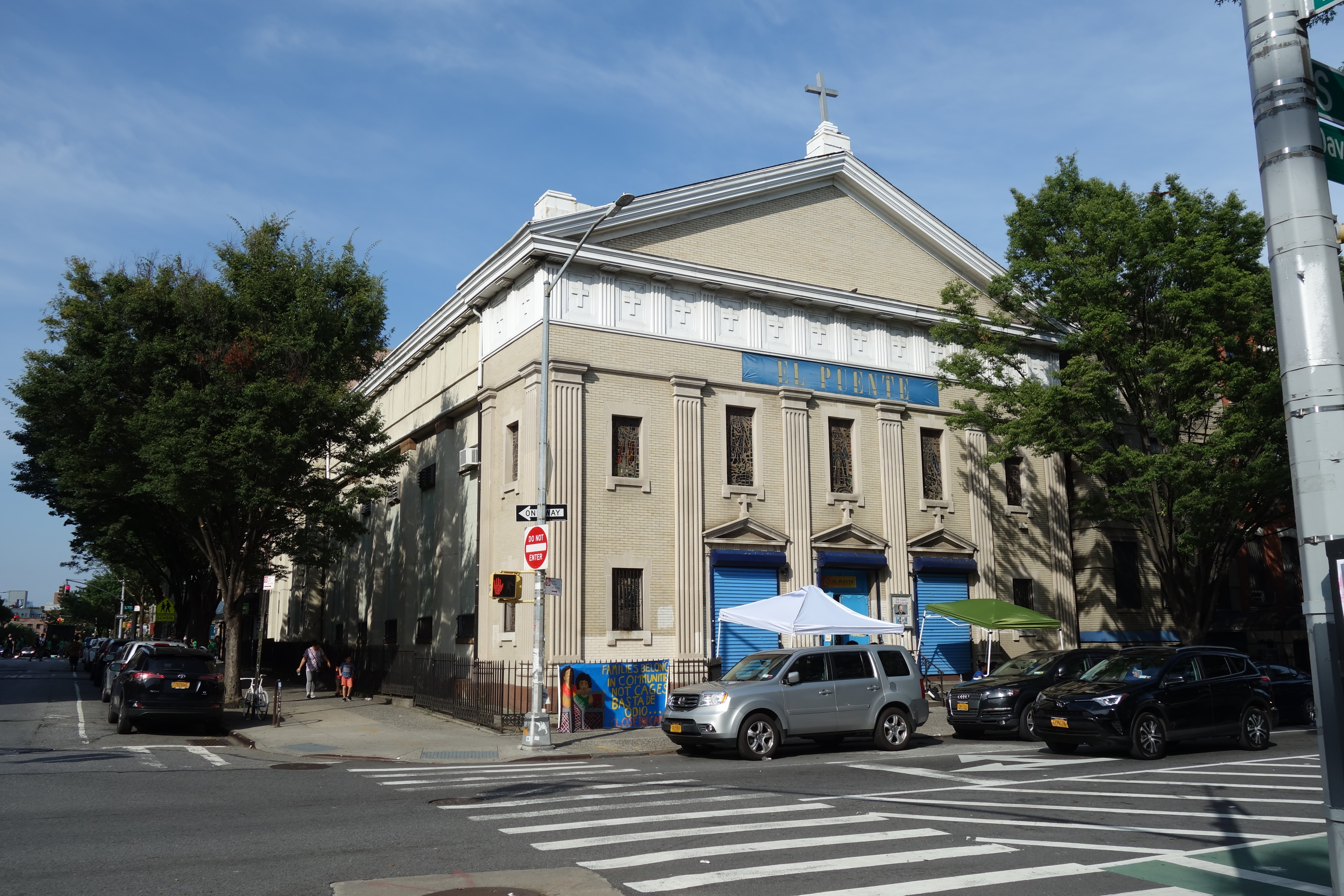
The headquarters of El Puente in Williamsburg, Brooklyn

El Puente is a non-profit arts and social justice organization located in the communities of Williamsburg and Greenpoint, Brooklyn, New York. El Puente was founded in 1982 by the late Luis Garden Acosta and co-founded with Eugenio Maldonado, and Dr. Frances Lucerna. Garden Acosta's mission was to stop the epidemic of violence stemming from youth gang/drug activity and street violence. El Puente's initiatives focus on fighting for a wide variety of social justice issues, including racial, environmental, immigration, educational, economic, housing justice, and more. As a renowned Latino arts and cultural institution, El Puente does most of its activism through various visual and performative art forms.

== History ==
El Puente was formed in 1982 when leaders of the Williamsburg and Greenpoint communities united to stop the youth from becoming involved in gang violence in the area. Their motives were to stop teen violence and improve health issues, which, like asthma, was a result of harmful pollutants being released into the community. El Puente was created by Luis Garden Acosta and the community in 1982; it was made possible by contributions from the students in Academy For Peace and Justice that opened in the 1990s. Youth groups are the main focus of El Puente because of the value they placed on the environment and because they are the future of Brooklyn.

El Puente means "the bridge" in Spanish, which symbolizes the progress they want to make from where the community is right now, to a place that they envision their community to be. They believe that a strong, united community is the key to success in moving forward.

=== Leader/Founder: Luis Garden Acosta ===
Luis Garden Acosta, a human rights activist, is the founder and president of a community and youth development organization in Brooklyn, New York. His drive to create peace and prevent injustices at the local and international scale was his reason to create the El Puente activist group in 1982. Luis Garden Acosta, son to a Puerto Rican mother and Dominican father, was born in Brooklyn, New York, in 1945. His initial life plan was to become a Catholic priest, however, after years of pursuing his career, Acosta's life plan changed after hearing a speech delivered by Dr. Martin Luther King Jr., which lead to his decision on becoming a political activist. Acosta has a diverse career background as he worked as community organizer, public health researcher, educator, and hospital director. He was also a member of the Young Lords Party, a Puerto Rican civil and human rights groups equivalent to the Black Panther Party. In January 2019, Acosta died from lung disease.

== Education initiatives ==
=== El Puente Academy for Peace and Justice ===
El Puente Academy for Peace and Justice, founded by Frances Lucerna and El Puente facilitators in 1993, is located in south Williamsburg, Brooklyn, New York. Members of the Latino community started El Puente Academy for Peace and Justice to produce a sense community for youth. The school is a theme-oriented public high school, known as a "new vision high school", which is part of a movement to improve schools in the education system as well. A theme-oriented school is one that is molded around a curriculum with certain theme, which in this case works towards helping their community provide a safe space for their students. The El Puente Academy for Peace and Justice programs provide meals as well as after school programs which are staffed by local members of the community in an effort to give students the means to make the school a safe space.

The school aims to foster both individual and community growth within the schooling system by incorporating students’ identities and experiences into the curriculum. This brings cultural practices from within the household and integrates them into the students’ education. The teachers help students understand the issues in their surrounding community so they can take action and make a change. Students learn ways to address possible social issues in their communities by discussing topics such as environmental racism and human rights in their classes and in doing so are given tools enabling them to attempt to create change in the overall atmosphere of the community to make it a more positive and progressive one.

Performance and visual arts are an integral aspect of their teaching, which allow students to share their knowledge to the public via art galleries, performances, and other forms of visual and performing arts. As a result, the knowledge that they obtain in school can be spread into the community.

== Environmental Justice Action Initiatives ==
=== Hurricane Maria Disaster Relief in Puerto Rico ===
El Puente has worked to aid Latino communities including people affected by Hurricane Maria in Puerto Rico. In 2013, El Puente started a group with around 100 members, called Enlance Latino de Accion Climatica, or Latino Climate Action Network, that were tasked with helping the affected areas. Ten thousand Ekotek solar lanterns, which provided light, radio access, and a charging port for cell phones, were distributed to Puerto Rican residents who did not have access to electricity. The lanterns gave people connection to the rest of the world, as well as families. In addition, El Puente facilitated food distribution, and rose the awareness of climate change through informational booklets. The first-ever Leadership Summit on Climate Change in Puerto Rico was possible because of El Puente's efforts. At the summit five Executive Orders were issued. The Executive Orders addressed climate change concerns that included the development of gas infrastructure and implementing initiatives for energy renewal.

=== Contesting the Building of an Incinerator ===
El Puente, in conjunction with the United Jewish Organizations of Williamsburg (UJO), prevented the construction of a massive incinerator in the Williamsburg area by protesting at the construction site. The plans if the incinerator indicate that it was supposed to be 55 stories tall. The incinerator was projected to burn up to 2,550 tons of trash a day. The two groups effectively deterred the process long enough for scientific research to be published, providing evidence regarding the harmful effects of burning garbage. This resulted in the Department of Sanitation being required to issue an Environmental Impact Statement. Funds were put into facilitating a study which proved that the levels of toxic pollution that would have been produced by the incinerator would exceed health regulations. The construction project was ultimately terminated.

=== Toxic Avengers ===
El Puente initially joined the environmental justice movement by starting a group called the Toxic Avengers. The Toxic Avengers are primarily Latino teenagers who protest environmental injustices. In 1988, students that were enrolled in science class taught by Jose Morales initiated a teen group that focused on the importance of education, and knowledge to put a stop to a nearby radioactive waste storage and transfer facility located one block from a local elementary school. The group relayed information about environmental hazards affecting local communities. The Toxic Avengers held Workshops, rallies, lectures, and marches to teach the community about the present pollution and to encourage the residents to become active. In 1992, the Toxic Avengers disbanded and are no longer a group.

=== Campaign Against Radiac Research Corporation ===
The Radiac Research Corporation has owned a radioactive waste plant in Williamsburg, New York since 1969. The plant has been highly debated and has been challenged by community protests for over 20 years. A bill was passed by the state legislature which requires the company to relocate the waste facility on the premise that it is only three blocks from a public school. El Puente has been involved in contesting the continuation of the plant. Specifically, the students of El Puente Academy for Peace and Justice helped to draft the bill which has been integral to making real strides towards relocation of the plant.

== Health initiatives ==
=== Action against asthma in Brooklyn New York ===
According to the American Journal of Public Health, asthma has become a label increasingly associated with Latino groups. Williamsburg and Greenpoint, Brooklyn, New York is a predominantly Latino that live with hazardous air quality and conditions that cause these high rates of asthma. In this town in New York, one of the primary causes of the air pollution is from waste transfer stations. El Puente's initiative is to take action against these harmful air pollutants by conducting citizen science within their community, otherwise known as community-based participatory research (CBPR). They have partnered with Centro Internacional de Epidemiología Tropical (CIET), an international organization whose purpose is to help community voices be heard. CIET helped El Puente create and administer surveys throughout the community to so they could properly collect data on the community and their health in relation with the pollution and air quality in the area.

The American Journal of Public Health researched the asthma rates conducted by El Puente's surveys, It was found that the effects of asthma in the Latino community within Williamsburg and Greenpoint varied depending on the Latino group. The two Latino groups compared were Puerto Rican and Dominican people, who showed the highest percentage of asthma among different Latino and Hispanic groups in the area. The study found that Puerto Ricans were more at risk than Dominicans because most Dominicans use homeopathic remedies while many Puerto Ricans do not. Through this study and other studies El Puente has done in researching the correlation of asthma rates in their community has shown a link to their hazardous environments including pollution and air quality. El Puente have been able to take action with the knowledge they have gained from their research by educating their community.

=== Vaccination initiatives ===
To provide health care for all one of El Puente health initiatives is to work towards providing better health care to their Latino communities. El Puente has made progress with health care through the El Puente Academy for Peace and Justice. The school initiated science programs and classes educating youth about measle vaccinations in the city. The academy was awarded New York State Governor's "Decade of the ChiId Award" for leading New York in "community-based vaccination campaigns". El Puente has promoted the greatest immunization effort against childhood illnesses within New York, evidence to the strength of their movement.

=== HIV/AIDS Awareness Campaign ===
As part of El Puente's goal to improve their local community, they are working towards HIV/AIDS awareness and prevention. The reason for their interest in the HIV/AIDS awareness campaign is because there is a connection between Puerto Ricans and HIV/AIDS. The efforts towards fighting the HIV/AIDS epidemic could not be done without the co-foundation of Latino Commission on AIDS and initiation of the ongoing HIV/AIDS Adolescent Drama Company: Teatro El Puente in America. El Puente has been awarded grants that lend a hand to fighting HIV/AIDS. One grant of $214,000 was used for prevention programs for illnesses such as HIV/AIDS, focusing on education measures. These programs include after school wellness activities, service programs, and performances, and events to raise awareness.

=== Williamsburg Neighborhood-Based Alliance ===
Leaders of El Puente and UJO as well as other community nonprofits created the Williamsburg Neighborhood Based Alliance (WNBA) to investigate public and individual housing, day care, and health care. This helped further health care initiatives, but it was a uniting point between the Hasidic Jews and the Hispanic communities. A power struggle between these two groups had resulted in violence and hate crimes. However, the communities decided to combine forces in order to combat environmental injustice and protect the health of the people living in Williamsburg, New York. This historic moment in creating the WNBA inspired the formation of the Community Alliance for the Environment (CAE)-- a group working for environmental justice initiatives that also reflects the ethnic composition of the Williamsburg area within the organization. The WNBA and the CAE have been involved in the lead poisoning awareness campaign, the incinerator prevention, and have worked to combat radioactive wastes.

== Using arts to communicate with the local community ==
Luis Acosta and the other founders of El Puente highly values the importance of using arts as a bridge for communication and as a teaching tool for the local communities in the Williamsburg area. The Williamsburg, Brooklyn communities have suffered from gang violence, environmental deterioration, and poverty, which are often associated with the high percentage of people of color that made up the majority of the communities. El Puente prioritizes the importance of education outreach with the community and the youth, especially preventing the younger generations from affiliating themselves with gang-related activities. The implementation of arts and culture is one of the main curriculums in the academy in order to expand the students’ perspectives on many of the contemporary social, environmental, and political issues. They believe that "art is the process through which students develop—and through which they can explore the environment, public health, economic development, and other issues that affect their lives".

El Puente's project-based curriculum includes a year-long project for students to use arts to discover different social, environmental, and political issues, and connect them to their own living experiences. The use of research-based project allows the students to experience the process of researching factual and relevant information to their topics, and also provides them the opportunity to present their researches to their surrounding communities. An example from one of the past projects was on the topic of garment industry. A group of students presented a public show with displays of rap, dance, and fashion show to address the issues and injustices occurring in the sweatshops by broadcasting the reality behind the fashion industry. The displays of entertainment not only created relationship development within the community, it also contained educational value which people in the community can learn about a serious ongoing issue.

Another example of using arts to create educational outreach and unify a community was the protest against the building of a garbage incinerator in the Williamsburg area. In the protest, a group of students from El Puente Academy of Peace and Justice created a 10-foot tall "incinerator monster" as a symbol of the threat and danger the facility will be to the community.
