= Carmen Avram =

Romanian politician (born 1966)

Carmen Avram MEP
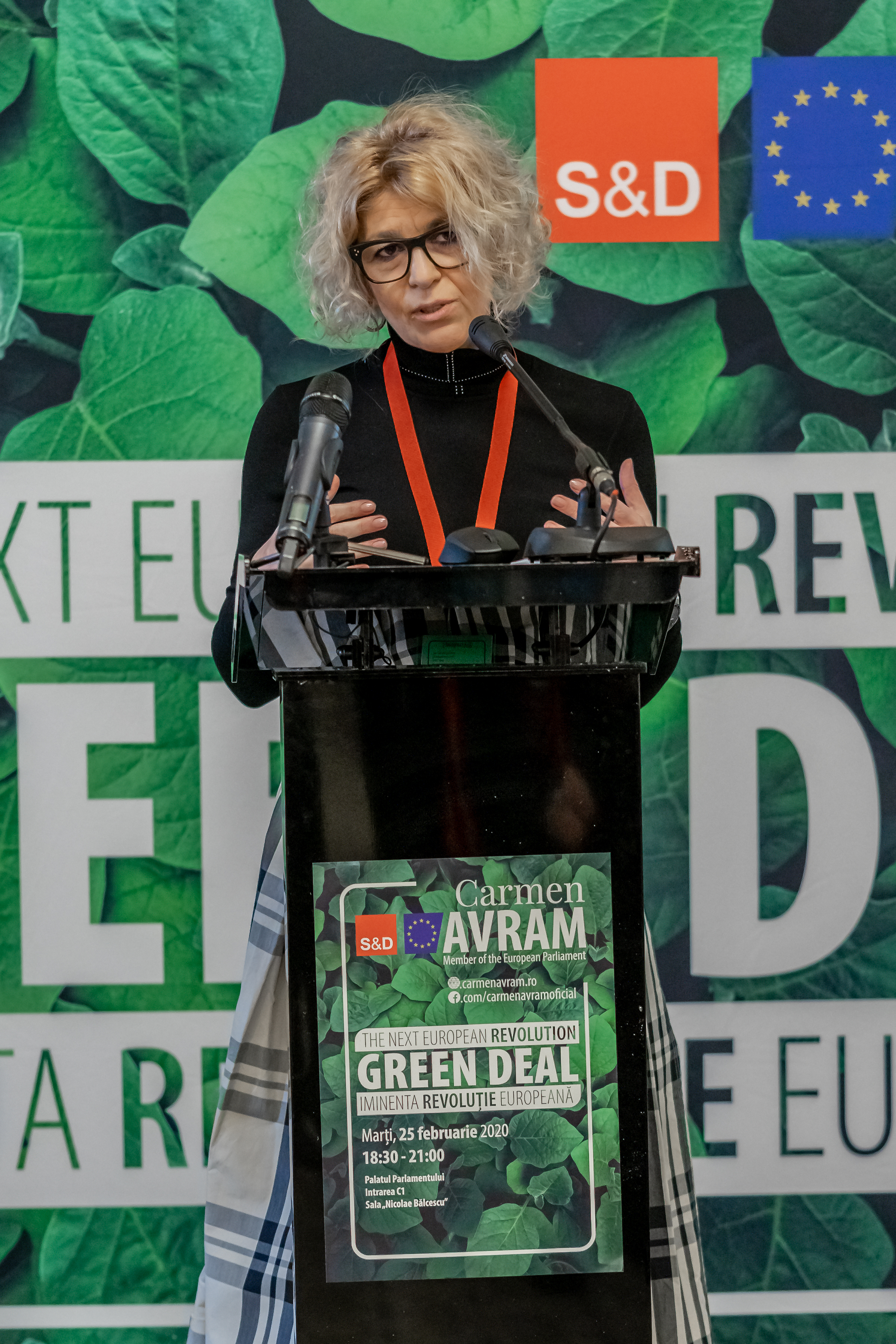
- Carmen AVRAM - MEP, during the Green Deal Conference she organized on February 25, 2020.

Member of the European Parliament for Romania
- Incumbent
- Assumed office 2 July 2019

Personal details
- Born: 8 May 1966 (age 59) Vișeu de Sus, Maramureș, Romania
- Party: Romania; Social Democratic Party; EU; Party of European Socialists
- Other political affiliations: Progressive Alliance of Socialists and Democrats; Party of European Socialists
- Education: Gheorghe Asachi Technical University of Iași; National University of Political Studies and Public Administration
- Occupation: Journalist, politician, producer
- Website: carmenavram.ro

Carmen Gabriela Avram (born 8 May 1966) is a Romanian journalist and politician. As a journalist, she has worked for the leading Romanian broadcasters ProTV and Antena 3. In May 2019 she was elected a Member of the European Parliament on behalf of the Social Democratic Party (PSD), a full member of the Party of European Socialists (PES). As an MEP, Carmen Avram is a member of the Progressive Alliance of Socialists of Democrats (S&D).

== Biography ==
=== Early life and education ===
Carmen Avram was born in Vișeu de Sus, Maramureș County, a small town situated in the picturesque mountainous region of northern Transylvania. Her father was a Romanian language professor and her mother worked as a chemical laboratory analyst at the pharmaceutical plant Terapia. She has two siblings, a brother and a sister. She attended the local German-language school, where she witnessed the massive emigration drive of her ethnic German colleagues to the Federal Republic of Germany, which has a major impact on her worldview. As a schoolchild, she helped plant a forest in the surrounding area of her hometown. This forest became the subject of a journalistic investigation decades later, in the documentary program "În Premieră cu Carmen Avram", as the forest had been clear-cut by illegal loggers and the town suffered unprecedented flooding.

After graduating from Garabet Ibrăileanu High School in Iași, in 1984, she attended the Faculty of Construction and Engineering at the Gheorghe Asachi Polytechnic Institute, graduating in 1989. As a qualified civil engineer, she briefly worked at the Călărași Siderurgical Plant up to the fall of the Communist regime in December 1989. After the Romanian Revolution restored liberal democracy and the free market, she worked as a substitute mathematics teacher and in 1992 moved to Bucharest to pursue a career in journalism.

In 2002, she undertook postgraduate studies at the National University of Political Studies and Public Administration, specializing in International Relations, graduating in 2004.

=== Journalistic career ===
Carmen Avram started her journalistic career at the leading daily newspaper Evenimentul Zilei, first as a news editor, then as foreign correspondent between 1992 and 1996. From 1996 to 2010, she worked for ProTV as a foreign affairs correspondent, covering major international events in Europe, North Africa, the Middle East and the United States. She then became an editor and reporter for the program "România, te iubesc!" at ProTV. In 2010 she joined broadcaster Antena 3, creating, producing and presenting the critically acclaimed documentary programme "În premieră cu Carmen Avram". The program, which was Emmy-nominated and winner of multiple national and international awards, made Avram a nationally recognized figure. While working as a journalist at Antena 3, between 2012 and 2019, she also taught reporting techniques at Intact Media Academy.

=== Political career ===
In March 2019, the Romanian Social Democratic Party announced its list of candidates for the 2019 European elections. Carmen Avram was second on the party's list. Following the election results in May 2019, she was elected as a Member of the European Parliament and joined the S&D political group.

She is a full member of the following parliamentary committees:

- Committee on Agriculture and Rural Development (AGRI)
- Committee of Inquiry on the Protection of Animals during Transport (ANIT)
- Delegation to the EU-Armenia Parliamentary Partnership Committee, the EU-Azerbaijan Parliamentary Cooperation Committee and the EU-Georgia Parliamentary Association Committee (DSCA)
- Delegation for relations with Israel (D-IL)
- Delegation to the EURONEST Parliamentary Assembly (DEPA)

In addition, Avram is also a substitute member of the following parliamentary committees:

- Committee on Employment and Social Affairs (EMPL)
- Committee on Fisheries (PECH)

She is Vice-Chair of SEARICA Intergroup (The Seas, Rivers, Islands and Coastal Areas Intergroup in the European Parliament) responsible for the Danube and the Black Sea and Vice President of the political committee of EURONEST.

=== Awards and distinctions ===
In her 27 years as a prominent Romanian journalist and producer, she received numerous awards and distinctions:

- APTR: “Human Condition Award” – Carmen Avram and Observator for “Împreună dăm viață poveștilor” campaign (2011)
- Association for International Broadcastings (AIBs): Jury Commendations and nominations every year from 2011 to 2018.
- Flacăra: Journalism award – “În Premieră cu Carmen Avram” (2011)
- TV Mania: Jury's special award – Carmen Avram (2011)
- “Woman of the Year - Excellency in social journalism” Award Ceremony, organized by Avantaje Magazine (2012)
- New York Festivals – Numerous gold, silver, bronze awards and nominations from 2012 to 2018.
- APTR Report award for “În Premieră cu Carmen Avram” (2013)
- Premiile Uniunii Cineaştilor din România (UCIN) – Jury Special Award for “În Premieră cu Carmen Avram” (2013)
- APTR Excellence Award for “În Premieră cu Carmen Avram” (2014)
- Emmy International Television Awards for “În Premieră cu Carmen Avram” (Nomination) (2014)
- Monte Carlo Television Awards for “În Premieră cu Carmen Avram” (Nomination) (2014)
- Premiile Superscrieri - 1st Prize for two episodes made for “În Premieră cu Carmen Avram” (2017)

== Personal details ==
In addition to her native Romanian, Carmen Avram speaks German, French and English. She also speaks Spanish and Hebrew at a beginner level.

Avram is a member of the Romanian Orthodox Church.
