= Yehuda Modern =

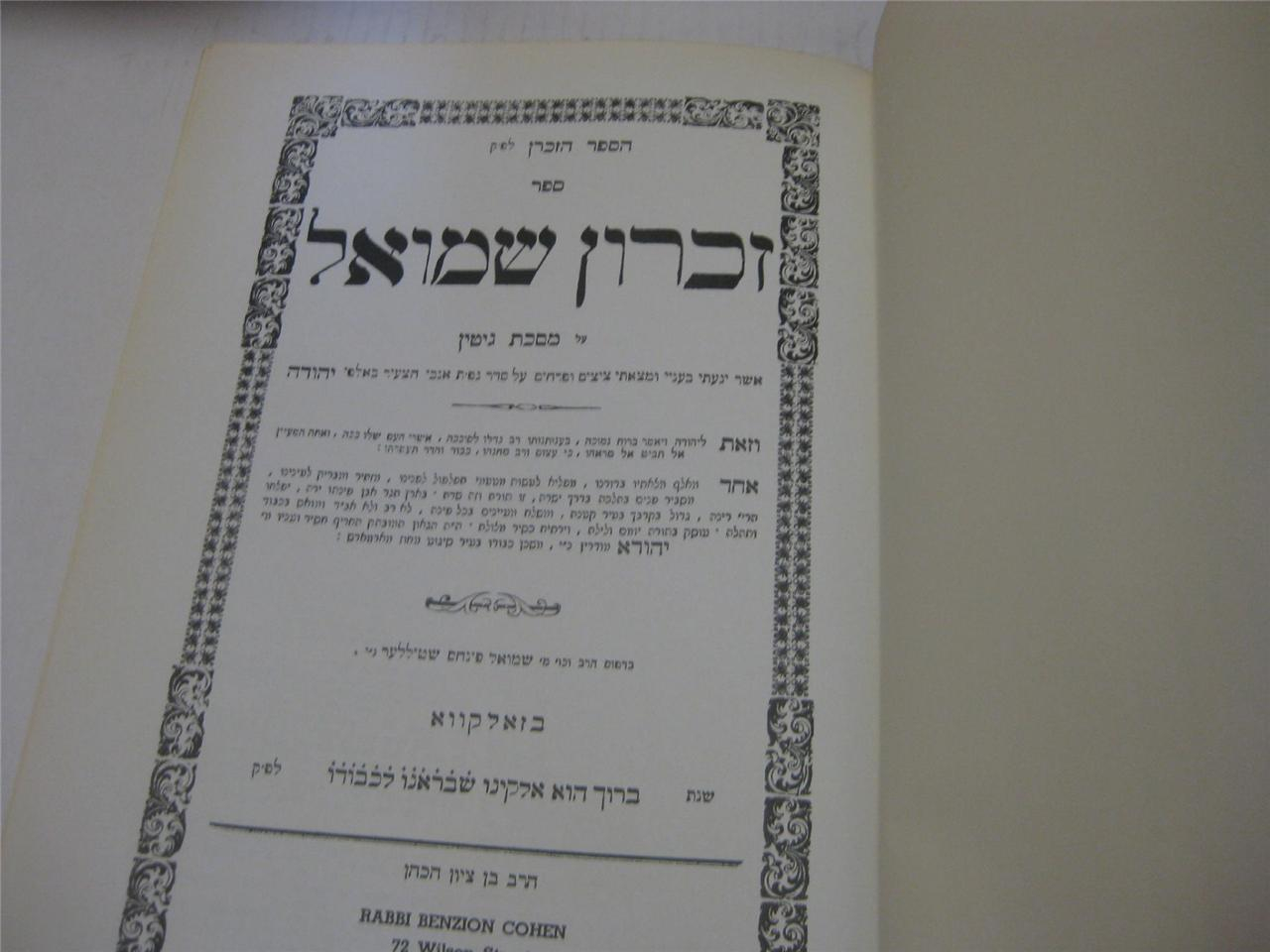

Yehuda Modern (December 26, 1819 – October 14, 1893) was a Hungarian nineteenth century.rabbi.

== Biography ==
Modern was born in Pressburg, Kingdom of Hungary (today Bratislava, Slovakia) on December 26, 1819 (8 Tevet 5580) and was circumcised by that city's rabbi, the famed Chatam Sofer. Modern was a child prodigy, and by the age of eight was attending the Chatam Sofer's lectures - sitting on the great master's lap as his beloved student. As a teenager, his knowledge of the Gemora was so thorough that he could state how many times the name of the sage Rava appeared on each page of Tractate Bava Batra (the longest Talmudic tractate).

At the age of 18, Modern decided to travel to a yeshiva where he was not known, and he set out for Ungvár (today Uzhgorod, Ukraine) to study in the yeshiva of Rabbi Meir Asch. Arriving there, and finding that Rabbi Asch was not at home, Modern decided to visit the great chassidic rebbe, Rabbi Moshe Teitelbaum (the "Yismach Moshe") in nearby Sátoraljaújhely (Ujhel). Rabbi Teitelbaum was impressed with the young Modern and proposed him as a husband for Chaya Rachel Kahana, the daughter of Rabbi Shmuel Kahana, one of the leading citizens of the town of Máramarossziget (today Sighetu Marmației, Romania). Modern and Chaya Rachel Kahana were married that year in 1837.

Modern lived the rest of his life in Máramarossziget devoted entirely to Torah study and the performance of acts of kindness (chessed). In particular, he was known for visiting the sick, often spending entire nights by their bedsides. At the same time, he declined all offers of rabbinic positions and all other honors.

Modern is buried in the Kahana family ohel in the Sighet Jewish Cemetery - built into the cemetery wall with a window to the outside so that kohanim can pray at the graves of those buried inside. Modern's great grandson was Rabbi David L. Genuth.

== Books ==
Modern published several works, including a Torah commentary, Pri Ha'etz, and a commentary on divorce entitled Zichron Shmuel in memory of his father-in-law.
