= Mendel Elefant =

Romanian-Czechoslovak poet, writer and journalist (1906–c.1942)

- מענדל עלעפאנט
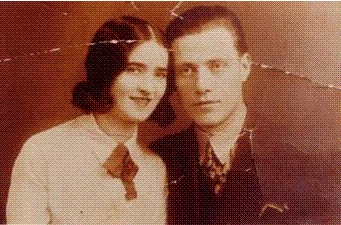
- Mendel and Ilonka Elefant
- Born: 6 September 1906; Vișeu de Sus, Austria-Hungary
- Died: c. 1942 (aged 35–36); Vilnius, Reichskommissariat Ostland
- Occupations: Poet; writer; editor; journalist
- Spouse: Ilonka Elefant
- Children: 1
- Relatives: Zechariah Elefant (brother)

Mendel Elefant (Yiddish: מענדל עלעפאנט; 6 September 1906 – c. 1942), also known as Emanuel Elefant, was a Romanian-Czechoslovak Yiddish-language poet, writer, editor and journalist.

== Early life and education ==
Mendel Elefant was born on 6 September 1906 in Vișeu de Sus, Austria-Hungary (present-day Romania) to the Rabbi Dov Berish Elefant and Bava Elefant {née Eisenberger: died 1917). Elefant's father was a Rabbi and served as a Dayan, and was fluent in six languages, whilst his mother was a businesswoman. One of 12 children, Elefant was the brother of Rabbi Zechariah Elefant and Rabbi Joseph Meir Elefant.

Mendel studied at the local Talmud Torah in Vișeu de Sus, before continuing to study at various Yeshivas in Northern Romania and Czechoslovakia, including the Yeshiva of Siget.

== Career ==
In the 1920s, Elefant immigrated to Rio de Janeiro in order to save money towards his upcoming marriage. While in Rio, Elefant published poems and literary articles in local journals and newspapers.

Returning to Czechoslovakia, Elefant worked as a journalist in Yiddish newspapers in the cities of Munkács and Košice. Elefant also worked as editor for the weekly newspaper "Der Kantshik" in Košice, as well as "Der Fackl" from 1929 and "Dus Yiddishe Vort" from 1933. in Košice, named in Hungarian "zsidó szó", which was well known at the time.

During the late 1930s, Mendel was a journalist for a Yiddish newspaper in Lwów, Poland (present-day Ukraine).

== World War II ==
During the Nazi invasion and the outbreak of World War II, Mendel was on a mission in Warsaw and fled towards Lithuania. His wife and child in Lwów fled to Lithuania as well, and they were reunited in Vilnius. Mendel had been walking in the snow for a long period of time, he developed gangrene and once he arrived in Vilnius – the doctors had to amputate his toes, among other things.

Later, his health continued to deteriorate, and he could not continue to run and was caught by the Germans. The year of death is estimated at 1942.

His wife, Ilonka Elefant, and his young son who was approximately 10 years old, continued to run until they were eventually intercepted by the Germans and were taken to a concentration camp. Upon arrival at the camp, a Nazi officer noticed the boy who was very handsome and had light blonde hair and blue eyes, and was a talented violinist. He took the boy to his house as a companion for his own son who was his age.

Ilonka Elefant perished in the camps, but managed to smuggle out a letter to her sister in hiding through a non-Jewish woman who worked at the camp every day, telling her what had befallen her son.and asking that she find him once the opportunity arose.

After the War, Ilonka's sister went to wealthy relatives in South America and they hired private investigators who were able to trace this Nazi Officer from camp to camp, but ultimately lost track of him when the war ended and the camps dissolved. No one knows what happened to the child, and it was assumed that the Nazi officer had eventually killed him.

== Personal life ==
Elefant married Ilonka Elefant, with whom he had a son (known fondly as "Pindichku").
