= Zechariah Elefant =

Hungarian-American Rabbi, writer and book seller (1886–1957)

- זכריהו עלעפאנט; זכריהו אלפנט; Elefánt Zoltan
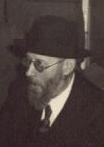
- Born: February 11, 1886; Kárász, Austria-Hungary
- Died: June 1957 (aged 71); New York City, New York, U.S.
- Occupations: Rabbi; writer; publisher; bookseller

Zechariah Elefant (Yiddish: זכריהו עלעפאנט; Hebrew: זכריהו אלפנט; Hungarian: Elefánt Zoltan; February 11, 1886 – June 1957) was a Hungarian-American Rabbi, writer, publisher, and bookseller.

== Early life and education ==
Elefant was born February 11, 1886 in Kárász, Austria-Hungary (present-day Hungary) to the Rabbi Dov Berish Elefant and Bava Elefant (née Eisenberger). Elefant was the brother of Rabbi Joseph Meir Elefant and Mendel Elefant, a Yiddish-language poet, writer, editor and journalist.

As a young man he studied at the Yeshiva of Siget and the Pressburg Yeshiva.

== Career ==
In 1923, he emigrated to New York City with his wife and three children. In New York, he served as rabbi of a synagogue. Later he opened a bookstore on Canal Street in Manhattan's Lower East Side, where he sold "rare manuscripts and published works" as well as Torah scrolls.

In 1938 he and his father published the book "Ein Habedolach" by Rabbi Chaim Zvi Menheimer, who was his father's teacher. After the death of his father, he published another book, "Ein Habadolach on the Talmud", in 1944.

The National Library of Israel has two manuscripts with his signature from his private library.

== Personal life ==
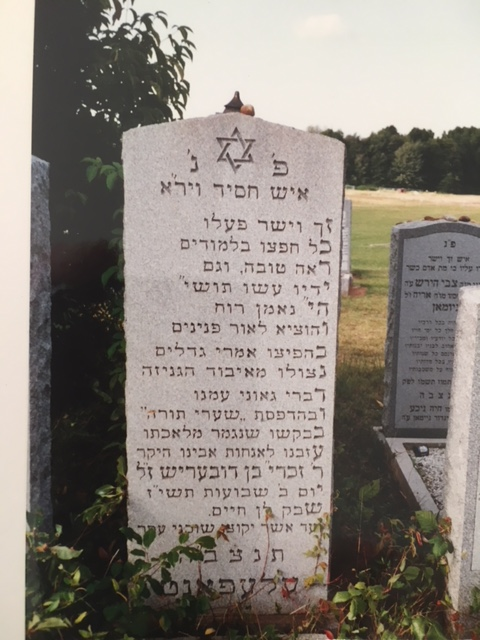
His tomb

A few years before the World War I, he married Sarah (née Kahane), a Polish citizen.

Elefant died in New York in June 1957.
