= Vișeu de Sus =

- Town
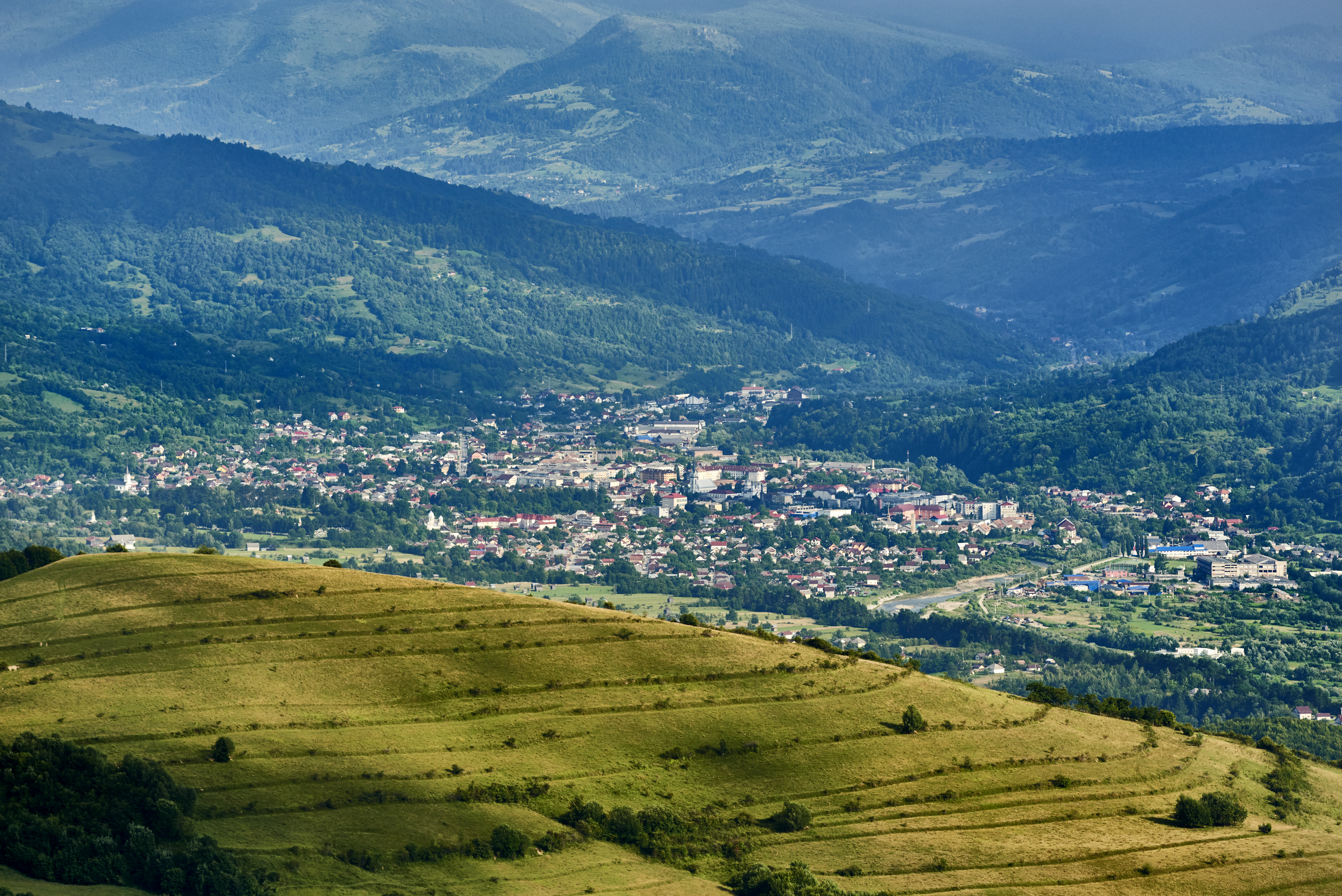
- Panoramic view of Vișeu de Sus

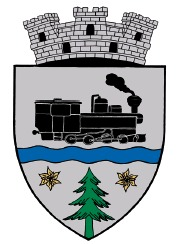
- Coat of arms

- Location in Maramureș County

- Location in Romania
- Coordinates: 47°42′33″N 24°25′26″E
- Country: Romania
- County: Maramureș

Government
  - Mayor (2024–2028): Vasile Coman (PNL)
- Area: 443.06 km^{2} (171.07 sq mi)
- Elevation: 427 m (1,401 ft)
- Highest elevation: 1,042 m (3,419 ft)
- Lowest elevation: 400 m (1,300 ft)
- Population (2021-12-01): 15,349
  - Density: 34.643/km^{2} (89.725/sq mi)
- Time zone: UTC+02:00 (EET)
  - Summer (DST): UTC+03:00 (EEST)
- Postal code: 435700
- Area code: (+40) 02 62
- Vehicle reg.: MM
- Website: primariaviseudesus.ro

Vișeu de Sus (Romanian pronunciation: [viˌʃe.u de ˈsus]; German: Oberwischau; Hungarian: Felsővisó; Ukrainian: Ви́шово-Ви́жнє; Yiddish: אויבערווישא, romanized: Ober Vishoi or Ober Wisho or Ojberwischo) is a town in Maramureș County, Maramureș, Romania, located at the confluence of the rivers Vișeu and Vaser. It administers one village, Vișeu de Mijloc (Középvisó). The town has an area of 443 km^{2} (171 sq mi) and a population of 15,349 as of 2021. It is best known for the Mocăniță.

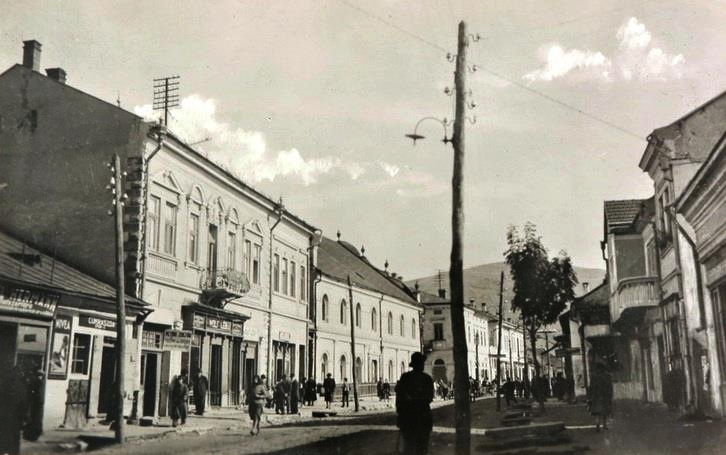
Viseu de Sus town centre, in the Interwar Period

== Demographics ==
Historical population
Year	Pop.	±%
1880	6,462	—
1900	9,221	+42.7%
1910	11,144	+20.9%
1930	13,456	+20.7%
1956	13,956	+3.7%
1966	16,601	+19.0%
1977	20,205	+21.7%
1992	19,167	−5.1%
2002	18,444	−3.8%
2011	15,037	−18.5%
2021	15,349	+2.1%
Source: Census data

According to the 2011 census, the total population of the town was 15,037. The town is situated in a hilly area and therefore most of the people live in the valleys with their settlements as follows:

- Țipțerai and Valea Poieniței
- Valea Vinului (1,000 inhabitants)
- Valea Vaserului (800 inhabitants)
- Valea Peștilor (500 inhabitants)
- Valea Scradei (700 inhabitants)
- Vișeu de Mijloc (1,900 inhabitants)
- Valea Botoaia, Arșița (500 inhabitants)
- Rădeasa (900 inhabitants)

=== Administration and local politics ===
Ethnic groups of Vișeu de Sus (2021)
1. Romanians (96.4%)
2. Hungarians (0.94%)
3. Germans (Zipsers) (2.23%)
4. Other (0.47%)

==== Town council ====
The town's current local council has the following multi-party political composition, based on the results of the votes cast at the 2020 Romanian local elections:

Party	Seats	Current Council
National Liberal Party (PNL)	11	
PRO Romania (PRO)	3	
Coalition for Maramureș (PSD)	3	
Democratic Forum of Germans in Romania (FDGR/DFDR)	1	

== Forestry railway ==
Vișeu de Sus is the terminus of a forestry railway system that extends deep into the Vaser River valley approaching the Ukrainian border. Timber is cut on the hillsides at the head of the valley and brought down by rail for cutting in the sawmill at Vișeu. The waste wood is burned in the locomotive boilers. The nearest national railway (CFR standard gauge) passenger station is at Vișeu de Jos, 4 km away, on the line 409 from Salva to Sighetu Marmației. The passenger branch to Borșa (via Vișeu de Sus itself), although closed to passengers in 2009, remains mostly intact (as of 2014) for freight.

The railway serves also for public transport between Vișeu de Sus and Paltin (terminus station for public). Trains go every day during spring and summer (from 20 June to 18 September), the departure is at 9 am. The stations on the way from Vișeu de Sus are: Novat, Novat Delta, Glimboaca, Cozia, and Paltin.

Trains may be delayed or cancelled without prior warning due to bad weather or Mountain Rescue advice.

== History ==
The town of Viseu de Sus, according to most authors of monographs, is documented from February 2, 1365 (Ketwyssou). This first mention of Vișeu de Sus as a settlement appears in the diploma of the King Louis I of Hungary. According to other authors, the settlement was documented since 1549, under the name of Vișeul Nou (The New Vișeu) or Între Râuri (Between Rivers), being situated at the confluence of the two rivers – name met until the beginning of the 20th century.

In 1373, the border of Vișeu de Sus and Borșa is marked, and in 1385 there appears Vișeu de Jos. The year 1453 is the one in which John Hunyadi, the Voivode of Transylvania and the governor of Hungary, gives Vișeu de Sus to the three knezes Ștefan, Petru Mândru, and Nan (Nașcu) and their brothers.

The evolution of the town itself starts after the year 1770, when there is established forestry centers with workers in Vişeu and Borșa – "țipțeri" colonists – from Spiš, brought to Vișeu by order of Joseph II, Holy Roman Emperor.

In 1743, in Vișeu de Sus there are settled miners from Saxony and establishes exploitation of ores. In 1773, in Vișeu there is established a logging exploitation center, colonized with "sași" (Transylvanian Saxons) from Spiš.

In 1775, in Vișeu there are settled German families from Austria (Salzburg and Tyrol). Between 1776 and 1794, the first colonists from Salzkammergut come. In 1778, 25 families from Gmunden settled in the village, mostly with many children. In 1780 the first construction by the newcomers were made such as: First mill in the east side of the city; the construction of the dam above Măcârlău begins, construction which would end in 1784, year when other families from Bavaria settle in Vișeu de Sus. Jews from Galicia also settled in Vișeu de Sus in the 18th century and worked primarily in the lumber industry.

In 1788, the elementary school of the treasury in Vișeu de Sus is established, and in 1790 the dam at Făina is built, as well as the first Roman Catholic parish in Vișeu. In 1798, the first general school is open. The work of the "țipțeri" is materialized also with the first timber factory (built in 1809), the state store (deposit) built in 1817. Between 1809 and 1810, the new neighborhood "Țipțerai" is formed and populated.

=== First War World and the "Miraj" German Military Cemetery ===
During the First World War the ridges east and north of Vișeu de Sus formed a static sector of the Eastern Front. In late July 1916 advance elements of the German III Jäger Regiment detrained at Leordina station and marched up the Vaser valley to block the Russian Brusilov offensive. Fighting continued in the surrounding Carpathian peaks until July 1917, costing the regiment alone two officers and 53 other ranks killed, plus about 500 wounded or evacuated sick.

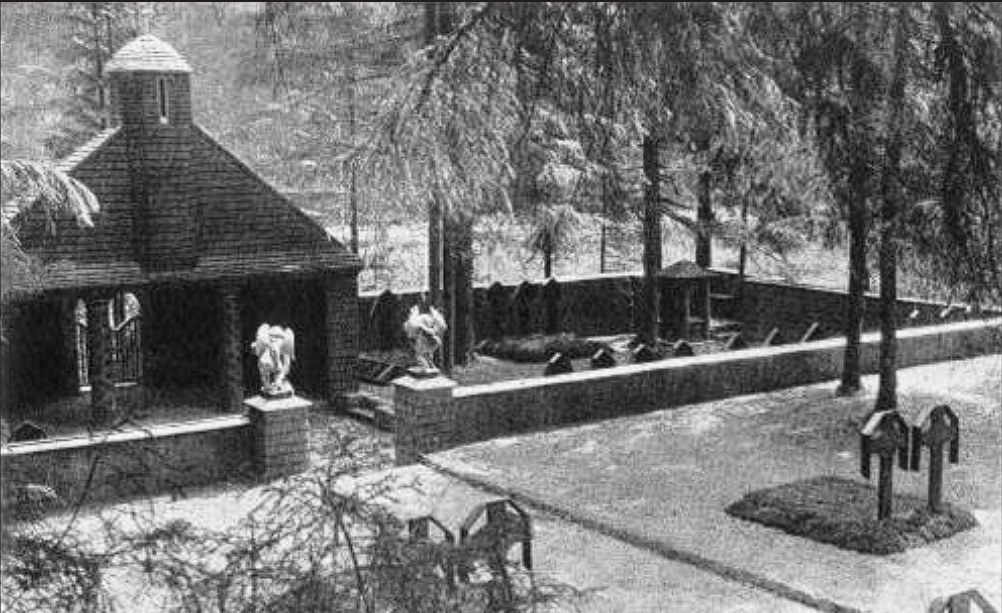
Picture of a chapel at "Miraj" Cemetery

To consolidate scattered graves that were vulnerable to weather and animals, the regiment’s commander, Oberst Richard von Rango, selected a three-terrace clearing at the confluence of the Vaser and Miraj rivers, 5 km upstream from the town. Construction of the cemetery began on 10 February 1917 while the ground was still frozen to a depth of 0.5 m; soldiers thawed the soil with field fires and worked in temperatures well below freezing. A wooden arch bridge, designed by a k.u.k. sapper sergeant-major, was thrown across the Vaser to give access; two carved red-deer finials; symbols of the Karpathenkorps flanked the entrance. Inside, the troops built a small chapel, rows of marked graves, and several wooden sculptures: a crucifix, a Madonna, and a 2-metre-high Jäger sentinel. The work was carried out by regimental personnel including Lt. Bruno Biehler (an architect from Freiburg), the sculptor Wilhelm Math, and the painters Hermann Grosselfinger and Walter Schwarz, using only hand tools and timber cut on site.

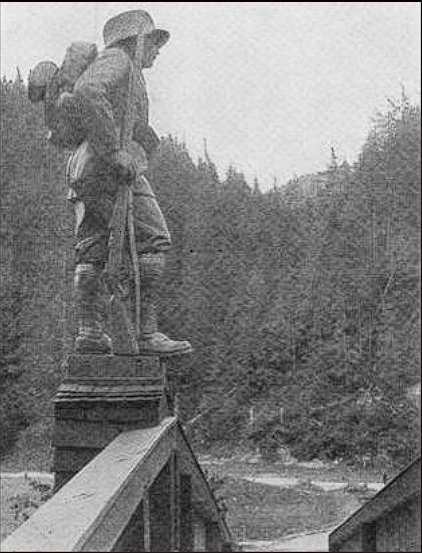
German Jager soldier Statue on a bridge in Valea Vaserului

Between February and July 1917, 105 identified dead were re-interred: 75 Jägers of the III Regiment, four Bavarian infantrymen, three artillerymen, one ulan, one machine-gunner, three mountain-gunners, one engineer, one Landsturm militiaman, and four Austro-Hungarian soldiers. The cemetery was formally consecrated on 25 July 1917 in the presence of General-Lieutenant Richard von Conta, commanders of the attached Austro-Hungarian battalions, and three military chaplains. After the war the wooden structures deteriorated; spring floods in 1929 destroyed part of the terraces and several graves. During the 1930s some remains were transferred to the Roman-Catholic cemetery at Poduri or repatriated to Germany, while others were gradually lost.

In 2011 a Romanian Orthodox triptych was erected on the surviving terrace to commemorate all soldiers who died in the Vaser valley, regardless of nationality.

The population of German and Austrian origin rose drastically and permanently, based on documents. In the 1930 census of Romania there were registered 2.753 Germans, making up 24,84% of the total population. At the census of 1977, there are 3,430 Germans in Vișeu de Sus, making up 16.97% of the total population. In 1920, the Jewish population of Vișeu de Sus was 3,912, making up 34% of the population.

The Zipser Germans were brought to Vișeu firstly as forestry workers. At 14, boys started their work in the forest. At Valea Vaserului, the Zipsers planted spruce. They took care of nurseries, deforested forests, sent rafts on the water to Sighet, Vișeu, and Borșa, they built rafts, roads, and wooden bridges. At easier works, women would help too. The hardest and dirtiest job was cutting down the forest and clearing the spruce trunks, and the most tempting for men was rafting.

Considering the long time the workers had to spend in the forest, an establishment in Valea Vaserului was a need. The settlement on Vaser represents the closest connection with the history and tradition of today's Zipsers. In this area several stories originated, among them: fata pădurii (forest's girl), omul alb (white human), piticul pădurii (forest's dwarf).

The stories of this ethnic group and the memories of the elders, as well as the documents, bear witness to a hard, primitive life of these people in the past. After 1868, Magyarization affected many Zipsers, some changed their names at the time with others of Magyar resonance.

The Jewish population was also engaged in the lumber industry. Between 1918 and 1939, Jewish-owned lumber mills employed hundreds of Jews and non-Jews.

In Vișeu de Sus, the exploitation of wood has an antiquity that is confused with the antiquity of the city. Even the legend says that more than a thousand years ago, a father and his son went to cut wood from the forest. Unhappiness caused a stick to hit his son dead. In memory of his son, the father built a church on this site. Houses were later built around the church and thus a human settlement took shape, which was called, at first, Între Râuri ("Between Rivers"), because it stretched between the rivers Vișeu and Vaser, and then it was called Vișeu de Sus.

With the arrival of German settlers, the exploitation of forests intensified. These occupations, which brought a certain income and a different social status to the residents, in addition to their occupations as animal breeders, are becoming more and more attractive.

The wood was cut from above with axes, on gutters with water downstream, gathered in dams at Măcârlău and Făina, and from here, formed into rafts, going on the Vaser and further to Tisza. Many of the "țipțieri" colonists practices were followed by Romanians. At the forest, they worked all week long, except on Saturdays when they went down the valley, and sometimes for those who lived further away, the work period was extended to 2–3 months. The "Butinars" (forestry workers) slept in cottages called "finnish", they had the fire in the middle, and the beds were arranged radially so that they could warm up more easily and dry their clothes in the winter. Today, in Valea Vaserului, the wood is transported by narrow gauge railway.

=== World War II ===
The situation of the Jews of Vișeu de Sus declined in September 1940, when Hungary took control of the region and Jews were sent to concentration camps in Hungary. During April 1944, the remaining Jewish residents of Vișeu de Sus were sent to ghettos along with the Jews of the surrounding region. Approximately 8,000 Jews were held in a ghetto near Vișeu de Sus. All the Jews were deported from area ghettos to Auschwitz in May 1944. In 1947, there were 800 Jewish survivors living in Vișeu de Sus, but by 1972 the Jewish community ceased to exist.

In 2011, a museum dedicated to the Jews of Vișeu de Sus opened at the site of the former home of Alexander Elefant, a former Jewish resident and timber factory owner. The exhibition presents the history of the Jewish community in Vișeu de Sus up until World War II when they were forcibly deported and sent to Auschwitz.

== Geography ==
Vișeu de Sus is located in the northeastern part of Maramureș County, on the border with Ukraine. The town lies at the confluence of the rivers Vișeu and Vaser, at an altitude of 427 m (1,401 ft) above sea level, having the characteristics of a mountain city. It neighbors the communes of Moisei to the southeast, Vișeu de Jos to the west, and Poienile de sub Munte to the northwest. It also borders Maramureș Mountains Natural Park to the north, and Rodna Mountains National Park to the south-east. The town administers a surface area of 44,306 ha (109,480 acres), making it the second-largest town by area in Romania.

=== Relief ===
The relief is mountainous, made of a plateau surrounded by hills, with the altitude varying from 400 m (1,300 ft) to 1,042 m (3,419 ft) at Vârful lui Dan (Dan's Peak). The relief has a major impact on the tourism in the zone, due to its views.

Vaser is the most attractive tourist route in the Maramureș Mountains, a defile, separating on the left a few crystalline shales: Prislopașul (1,201 m), Grebeni (1594 m), Novicioru (1,452 m). It shares its border with Ukraine at 1,500–1,700 metres (4,900–5,600 ft).

=== Hydrography and climate ===
The river Vișeu rises under the Prislop Pass, at an altitude of 1,414 m (4,639 ft) and flows in the river Tisza near the commune of Bistra at an altitude of around 330 m (1,080 ft). The river is 80 km (50 mi) long, and has an inclination of 2–50 m/km. Its river basin is developed, mostly, in the mountain zone (67%), which ensures a high density of the hydrographic network and a specific drainage of the highest in the country. The river Valea Vinului flows into the Vișeu in Vișeu de Mijloc.

The river Vaser rises from the Maramureș Mountains, forming from the springs Boului and Munceii Albi. It is 62 km (39 mi) long, and it is Vișeu's most important tributary, with a flow higher than itself.

The climate of Vișeu de Sus itself is classified as humid continental (Dfb), characterized by warm summers and cold, snowy winters, typical of high-altitude regions in Eastern Europe. The town’s geography, with its forested slopes, river valleys, and proximity to protected natural parks (i.e Maramureș Mountains Natural Park, and Rodna Mountains National Park.) They play a significant role in the local tourism, forestry, and agricultural activities.

=== Mineral waters ===
The special value of these natural riches is given by the great qualitative and quantitative diversity of mineralizations, as well as by the therapeutic (curative) qualities. Mineral waters, due to their complex chemical composition, are natural healing factors with a special therapeutic importance. Waters containing mineral substances and carbon dioxide are waters with a high therapeutic level. The mineral springs in the area resulted from an intense circulation of hydrothermal solutions in the eruptive rocks and in the mass of crystalline rocks and Eocene sedimentary rocks. In the Maramureș Mountains Natural Park, there had been identified 20.

Other mineral waters can be found in Vișeu de Sus and Valea Vinului. Mineral springs in Valea Vinului, especially the spring known as 'Gulaci', have a mineralization of 12.7 g/L and a concentration of 2,26 g/L CO_{2}.

=== Fauna, flora, and funga ===
Vegetation is an important element of the natural environment, as well as a factor of tourist attraction. The variety of the relief and the climate are elements that have determined a rich and varied background in the Maramureș Mountains.

The flora and vegetation represent a great importance and interest in several points of view. In an economic point of view, we mention the importance of fodder, melliferous flowers, medicine, food, decoration, etc. Among the food species, we find: strawberries, blackberries, raspberries, elderflower, cherries and edible mushrooms. Among the medicinal plants, we find: Betula pendula, Crataegus monogyna, Betonica officinalis and Pinus mugo. Some are used for their flavored content, such as: Carum carvi, Funingirus communis, Mentha species and Oxalis acetosella.

==== Fauna of alpine hollows ====
Mammals are represented by characteristic species of alpine hollows – the black goat (Rupicapra rupicapra). Although it is specific to the alpine floor, it descends mainly in winter and enters the spruce in search of food. There are only a few specimens of black goats and mountain marmots in the Maramureș Mountains Natural Park, being repopulated since 1965. Birds in the alpine zone are represented by golden eagles, water pipits, accentors and northern pintails. There are reptiles too, most notable being: common European vipers and viviparous lizards, being present in zones with calcareous rocks. At meadows, there are common frogs. There once lived other birds, such as bearded vultures, cinereous vultures and griffon vultures.

==== Fauna of forest zones ====
The fauna of the softwood forest is represented by: bears, wolves and wild boars. Bird species include: black grouse, western capercaillies, Eurasian three-toed woodpeckers, red crossbills, coal tits, ring ouzels, etc. - which are characteristic species for coniferous forests.

==== Fauna of deciduous forests ====
Includes: red deer, foxes, several marten species, squirrels, stoats, least weasels, etc. Birds in the forests are represented by wood owls, Eurasian jays, stock doves, etc. Here we also find birds of prey: Eurasian sparrowhawks, northern goshawks, common buzzards, lesser spotted eagles. There can also be found: grey partridges, common pheasants and common quails.

== Sister cities ==
- Fürstenfeld, Austria
- Zug, Switzerland
- Verkhovyna, Ukraine
- Staunton, United States

== Natives ==
- Carmen Avram (born 1966), journalist and politician
- Simion Bumbar (born 2005), footballer
- Marius Coman (born 1996), footballer
- Ioan Condruc (born 1951), footballer
- Mendel Elefant (1906–1942?), writer, artist, and journalist
- László Ferenczy (1898–1946), officer in the Hungarian Royal Gendarmerie
- David L. Genuth (1901–1974), Orthodox rabbi in Cleveland
- Liviu Pop (born 1974), politician
- Vasile Tomoiagă (born 1964), rower

== Image gallery ==
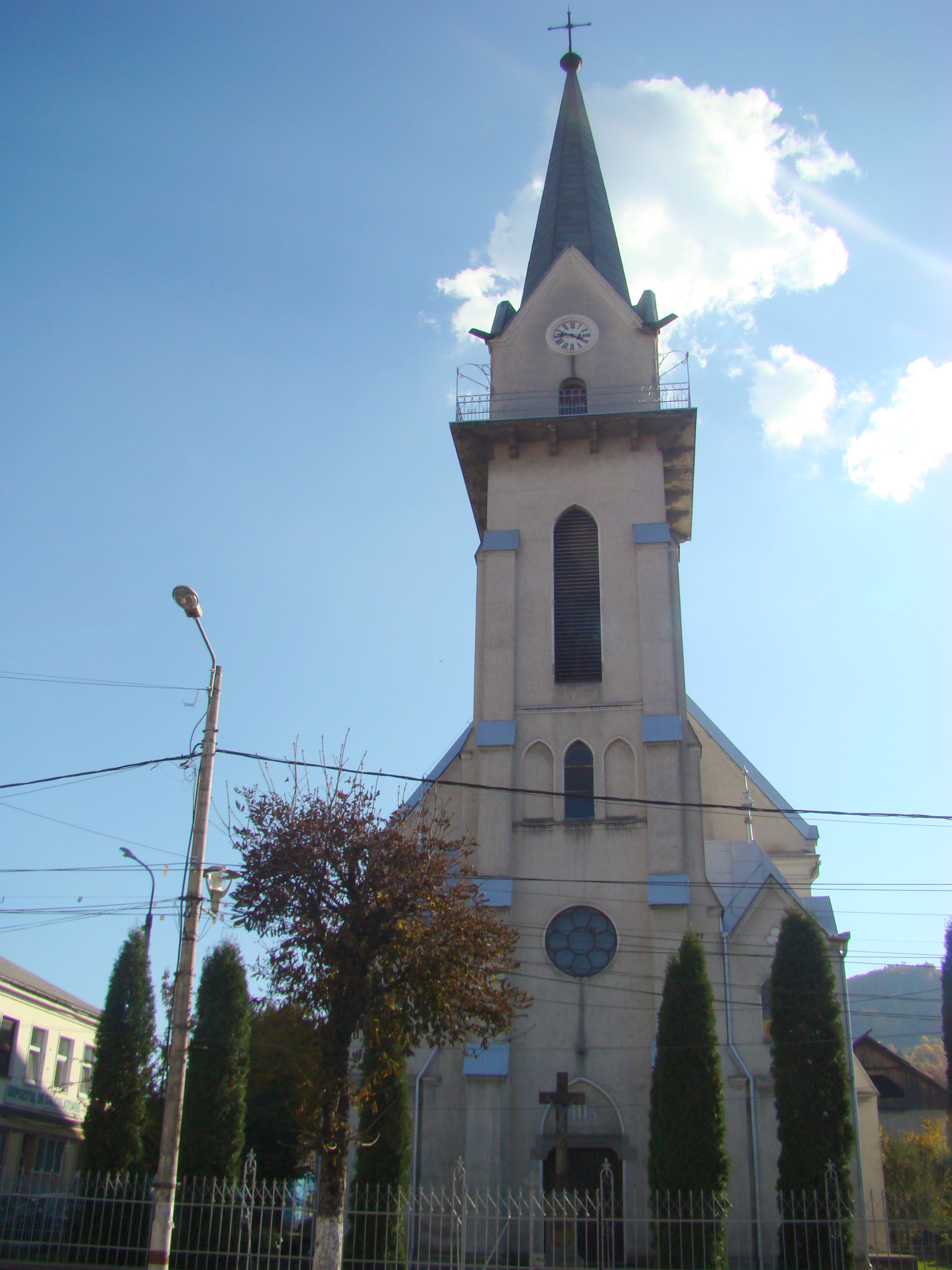

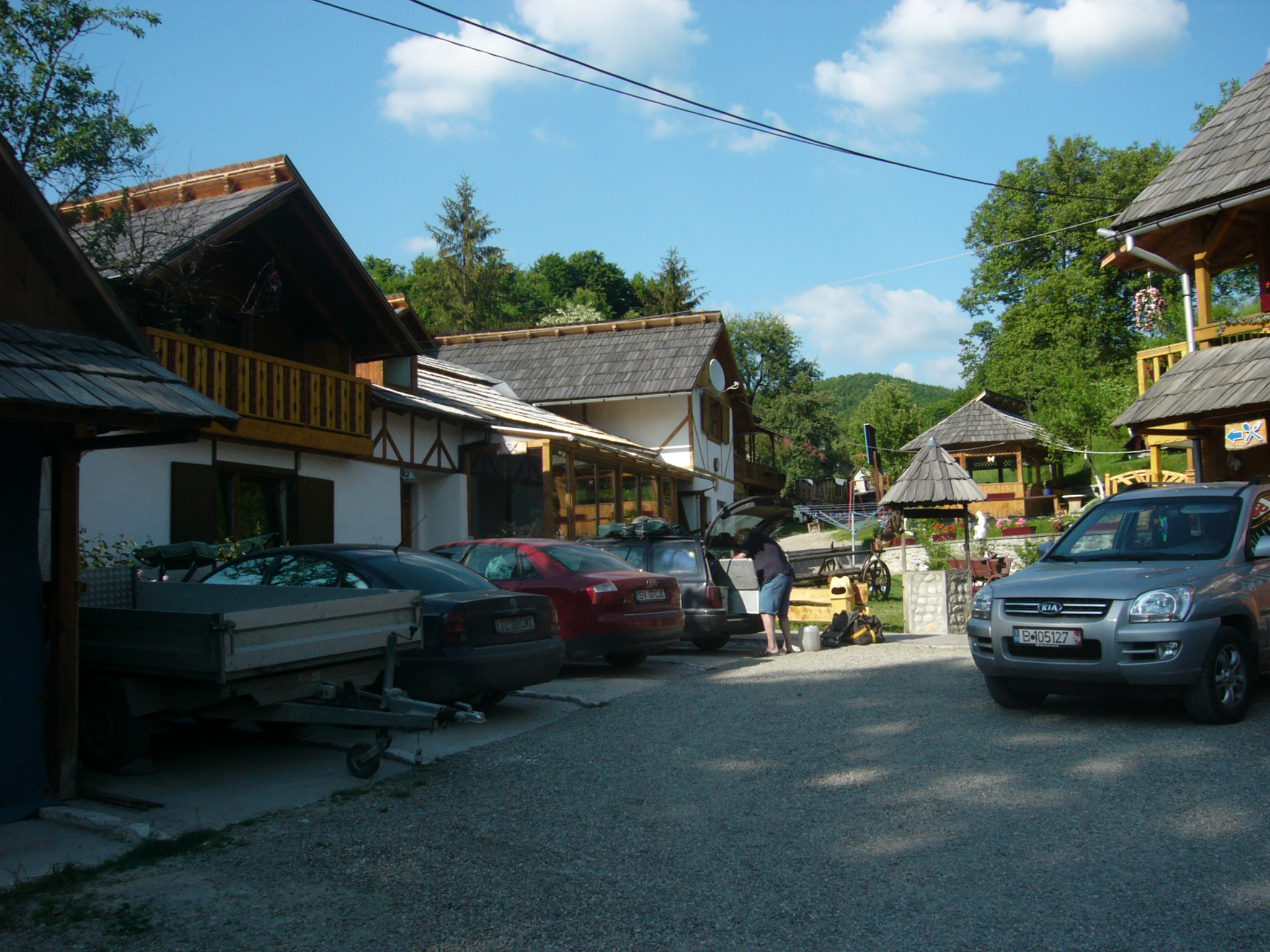

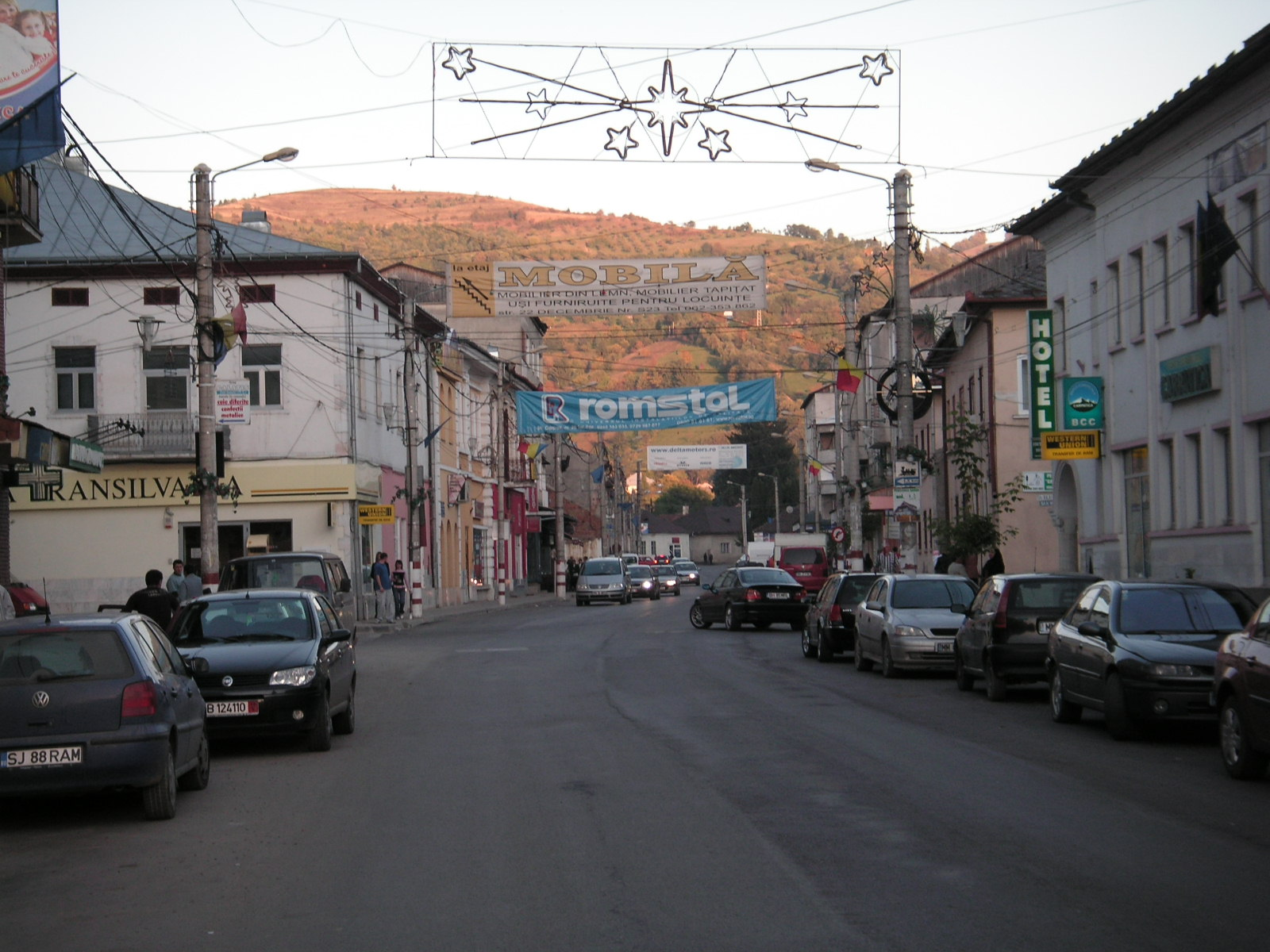

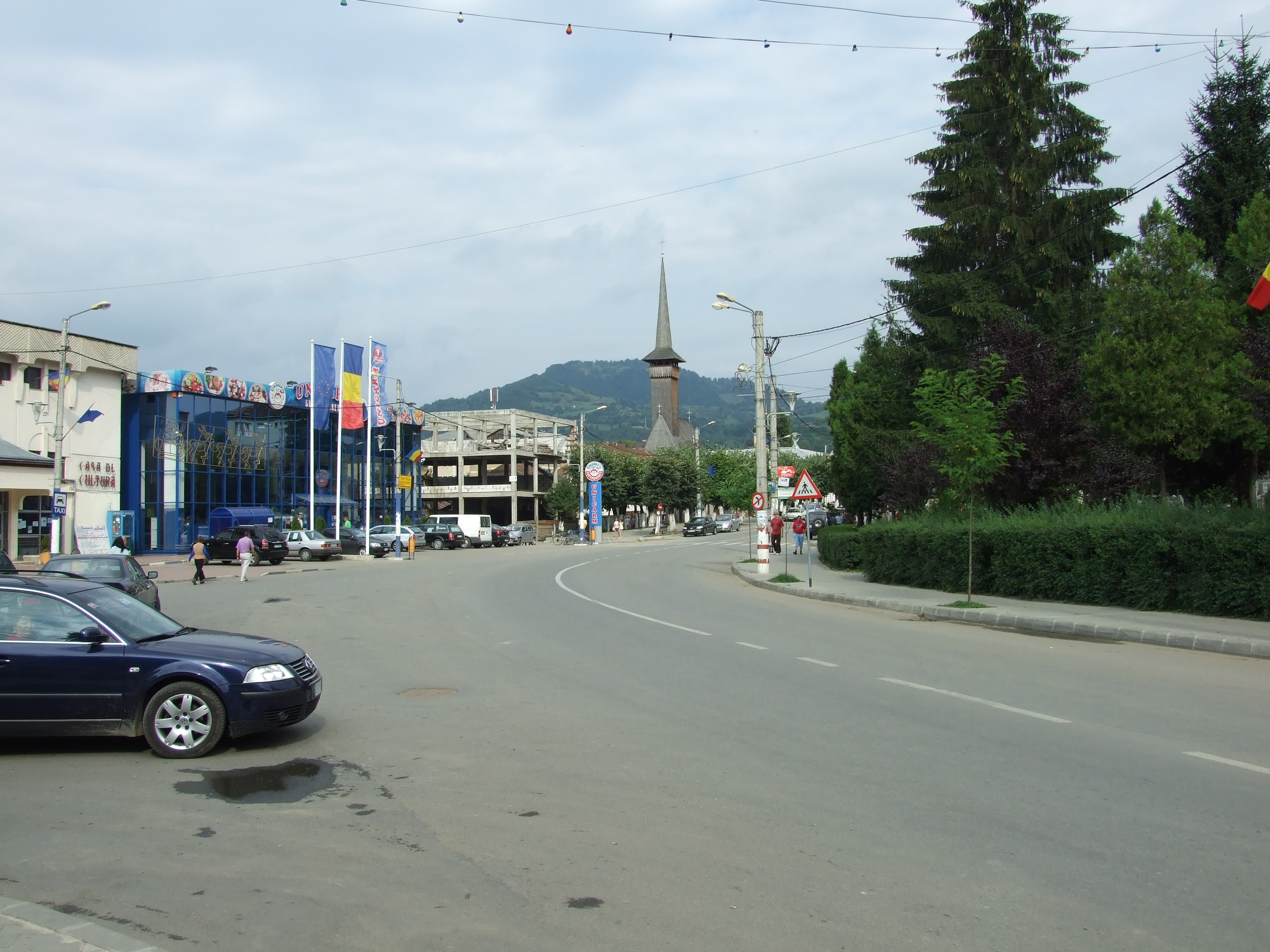

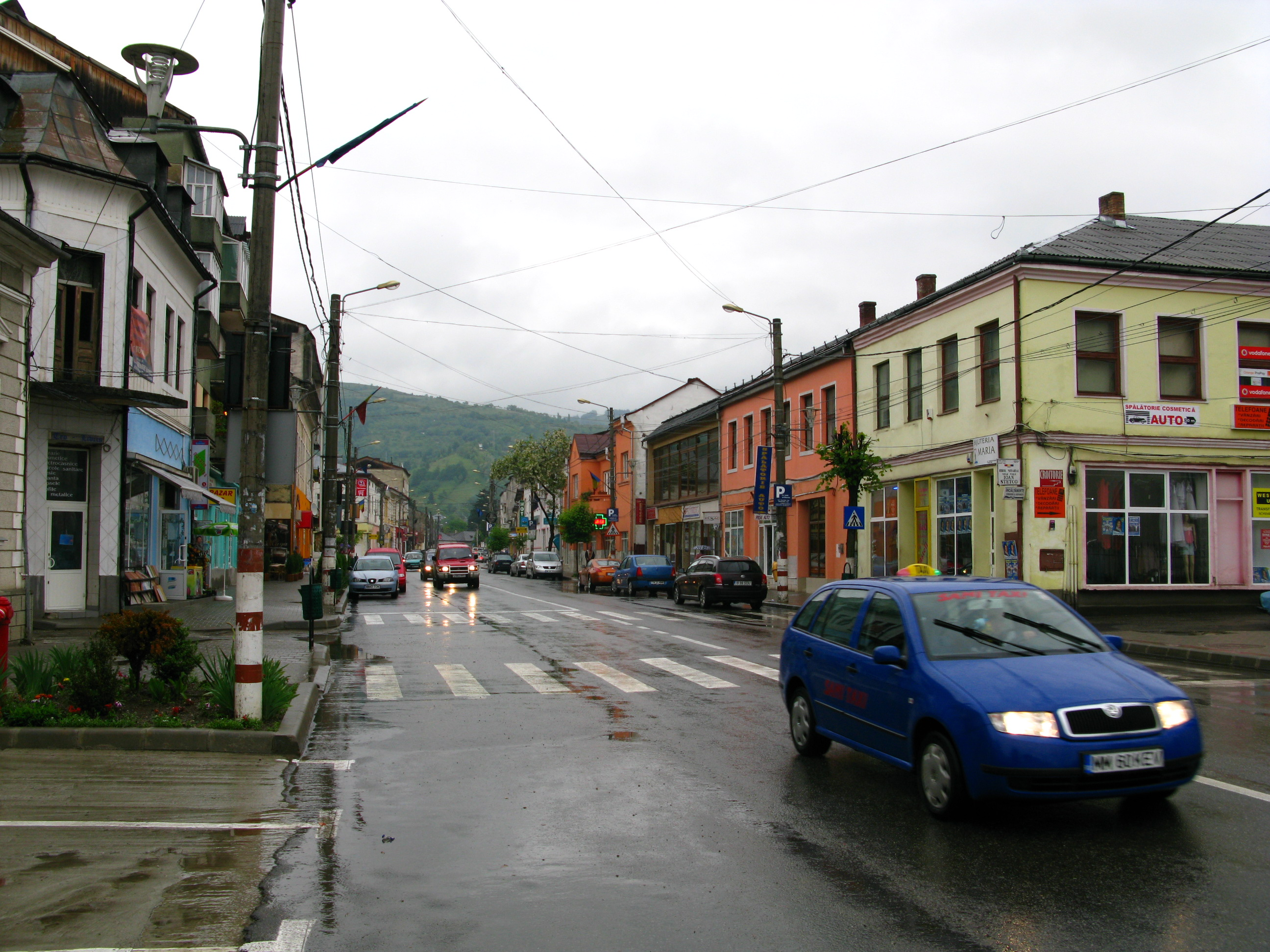

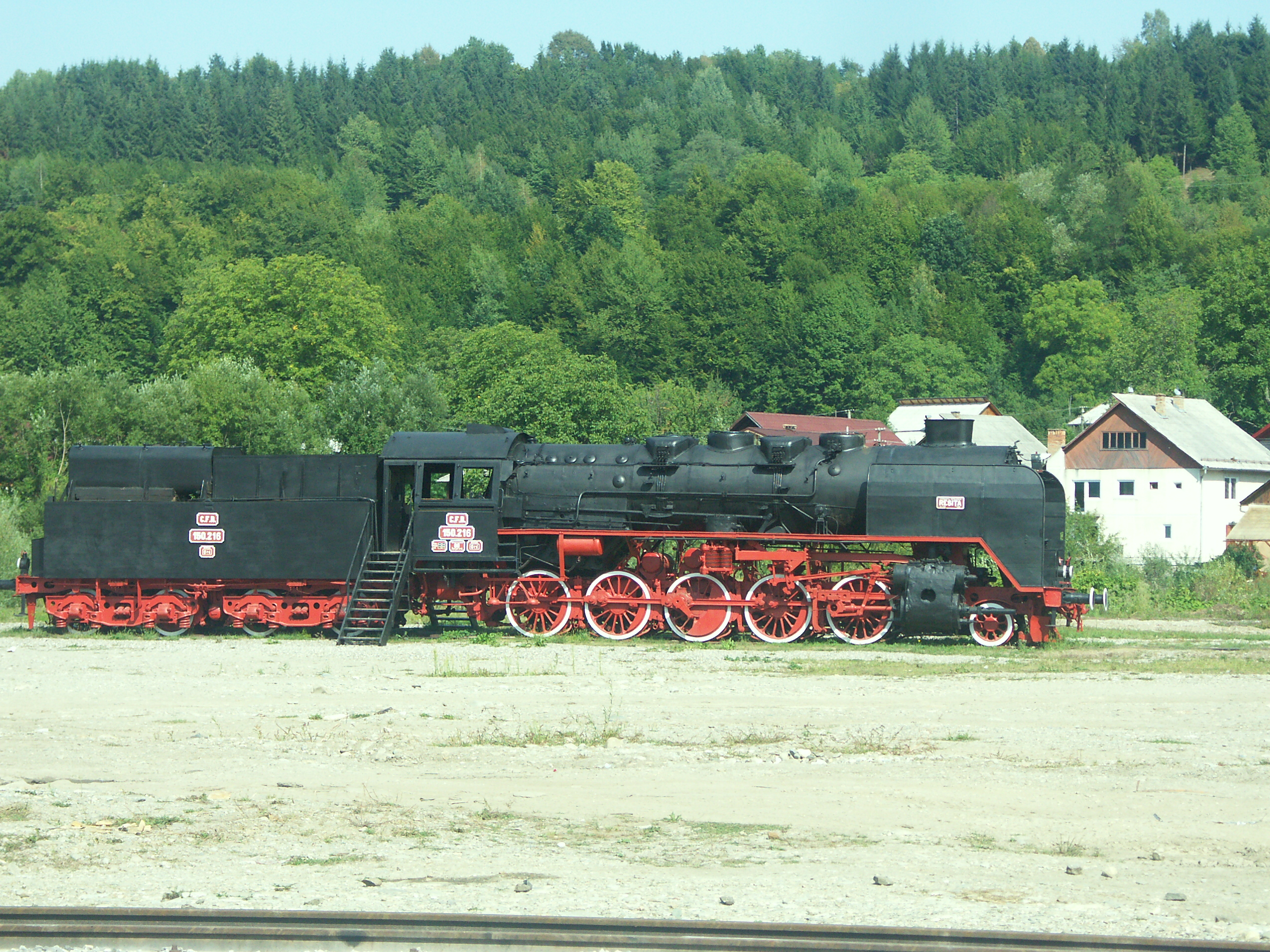

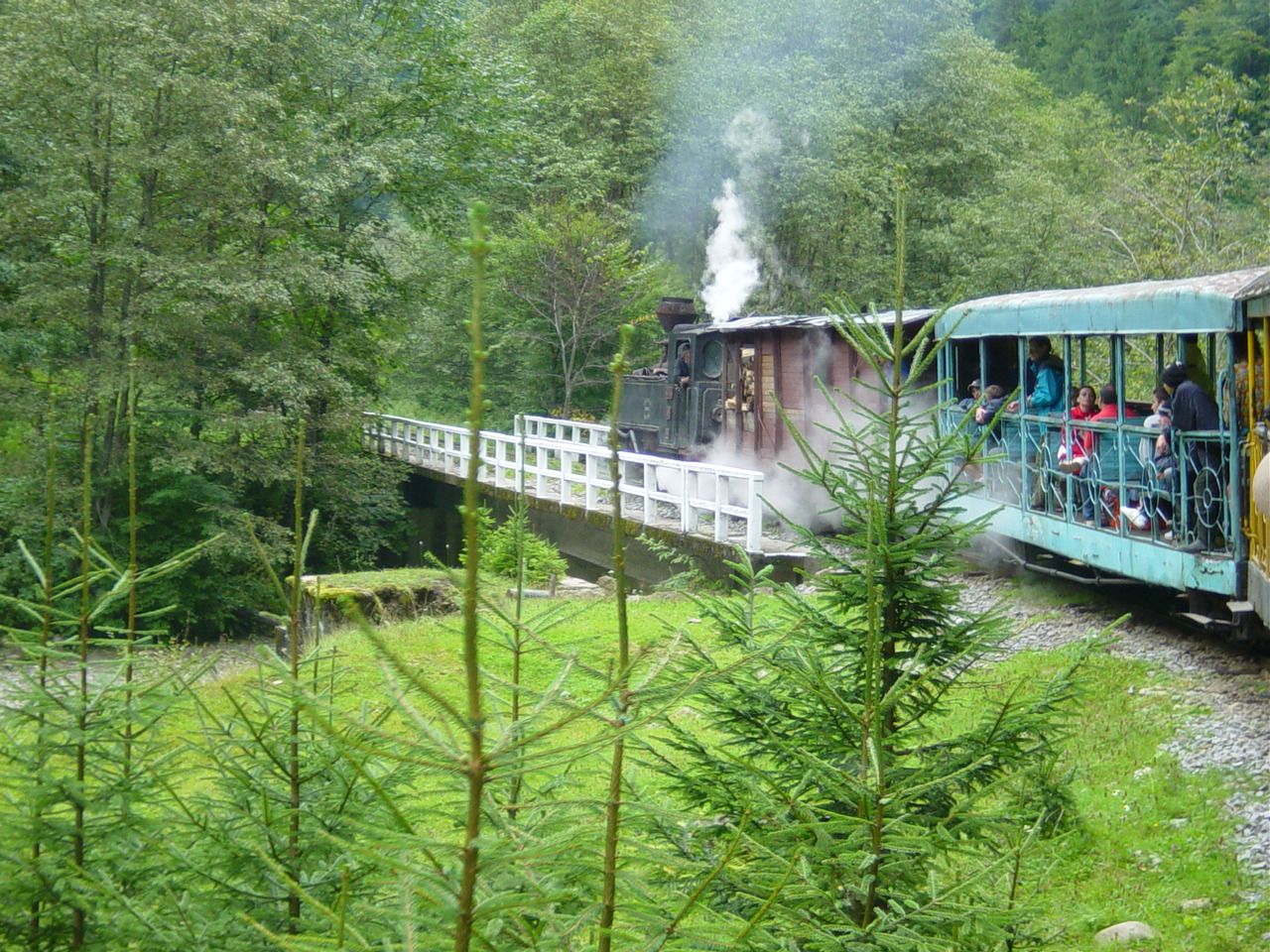

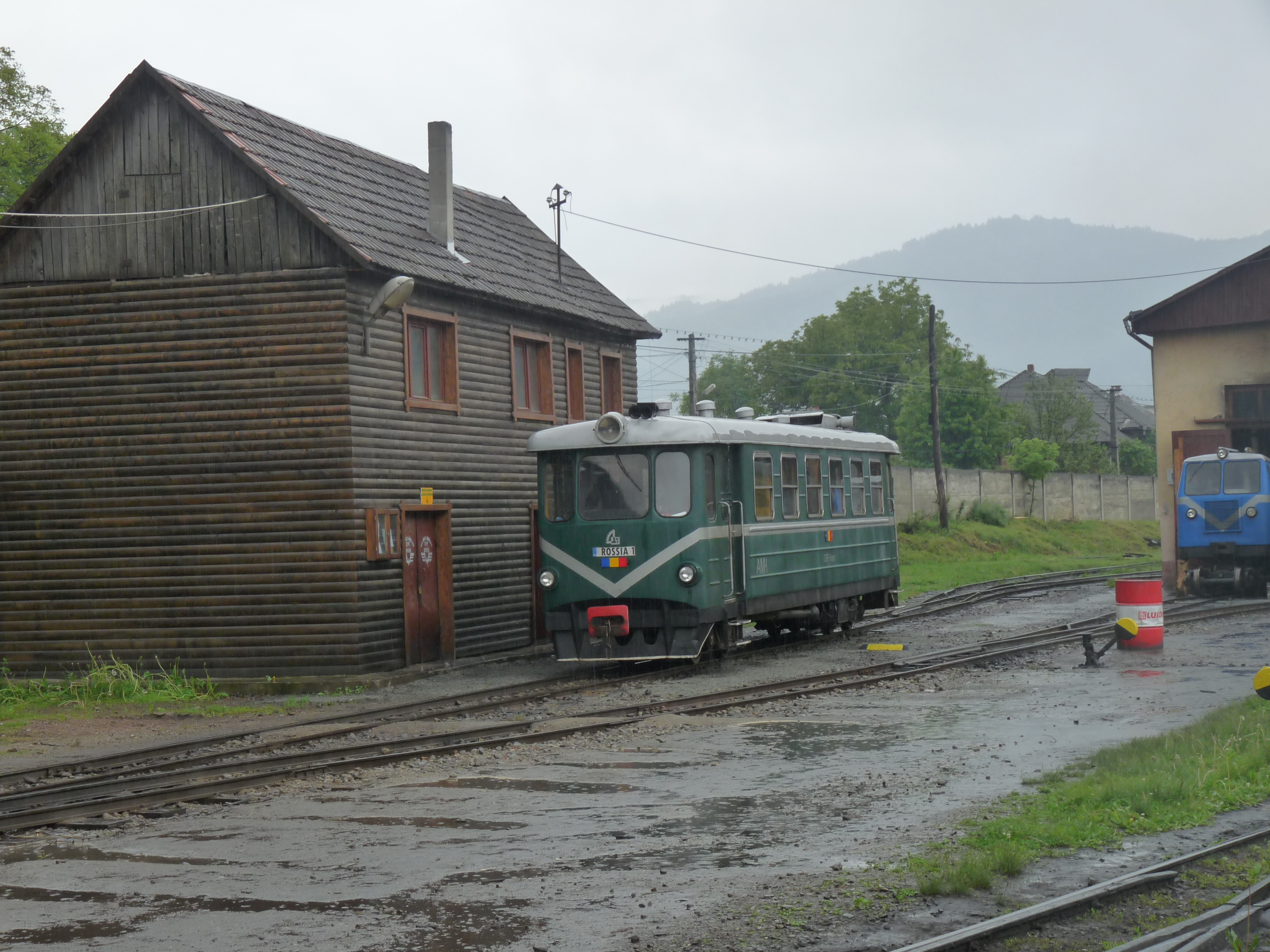

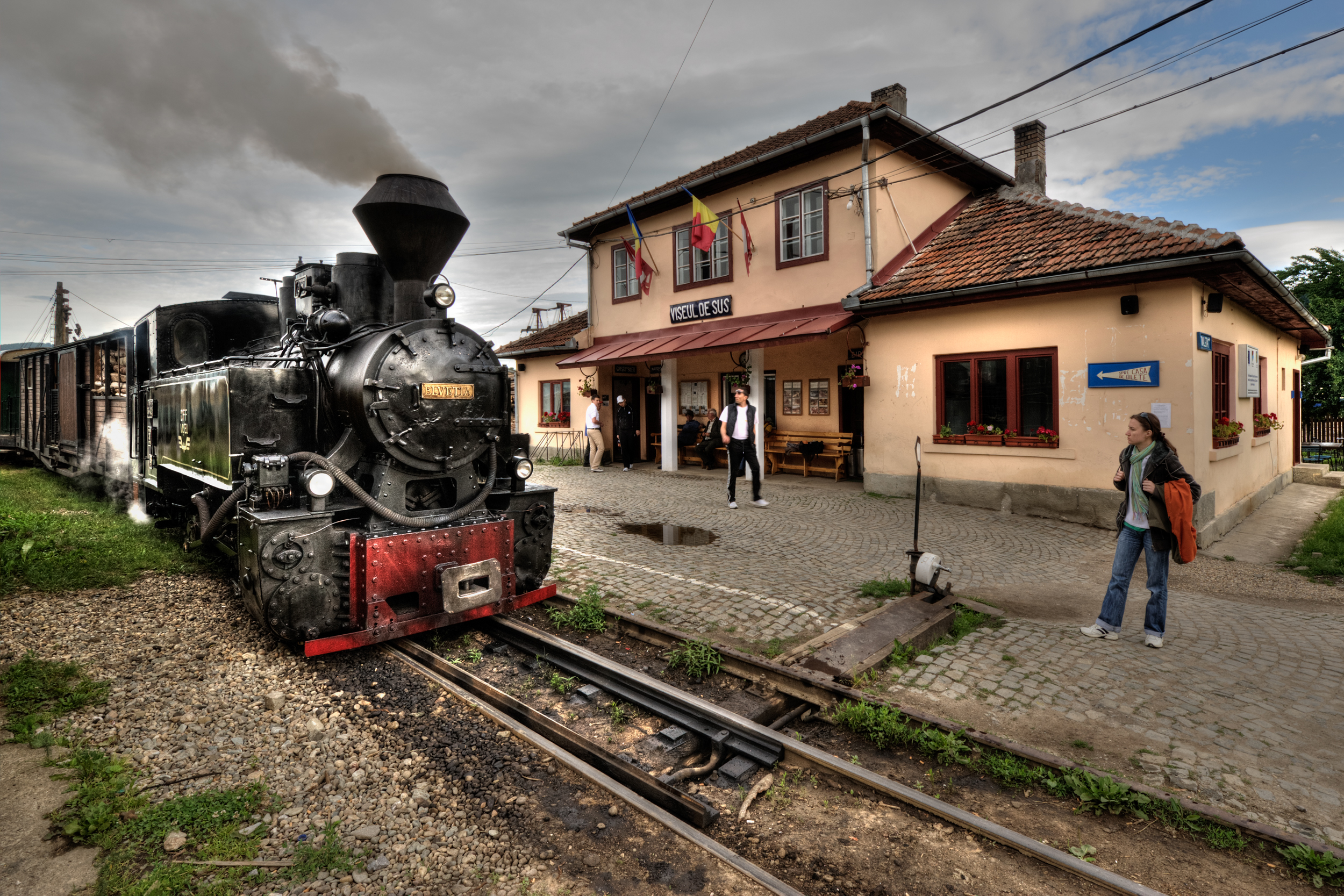

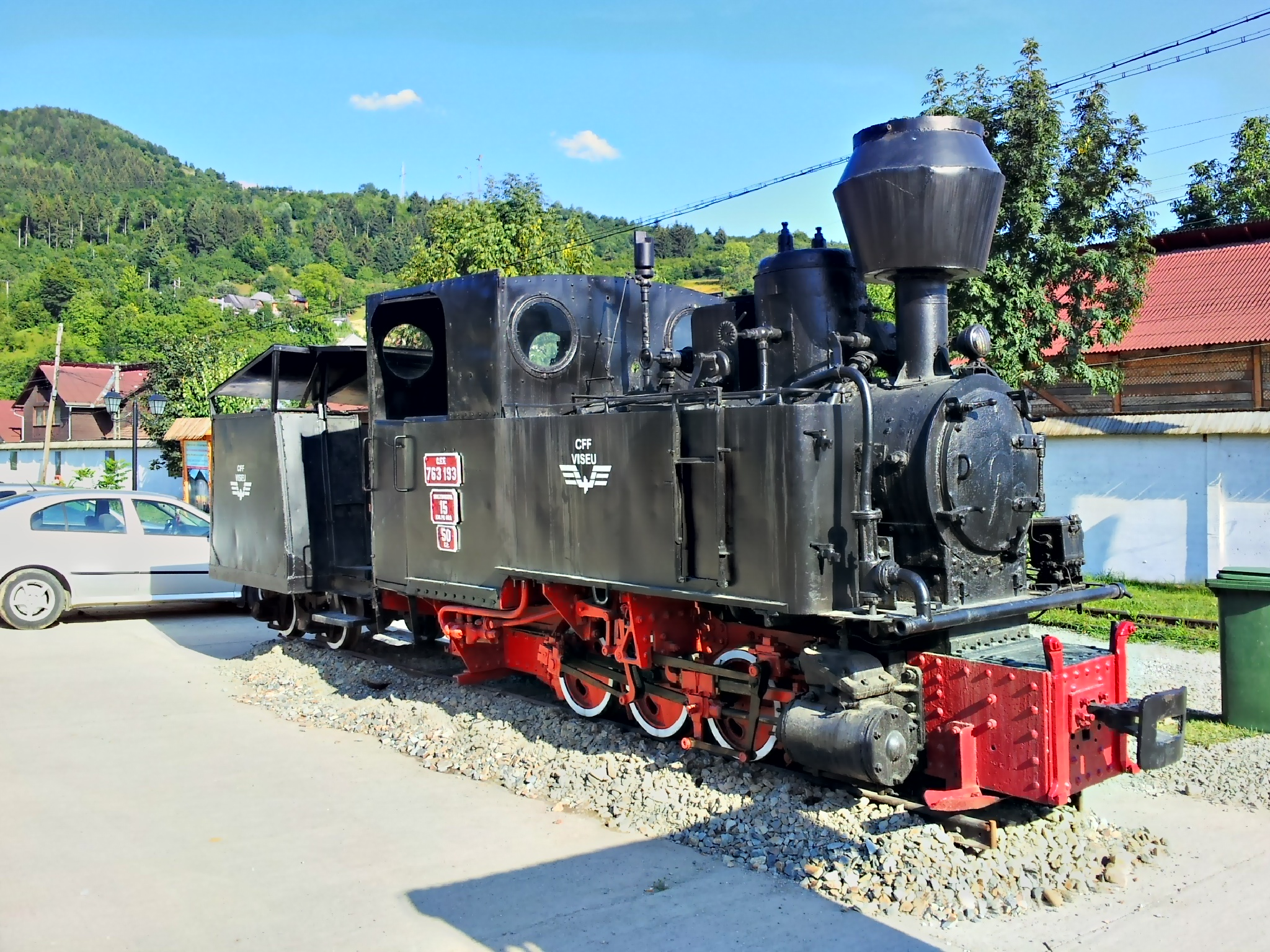

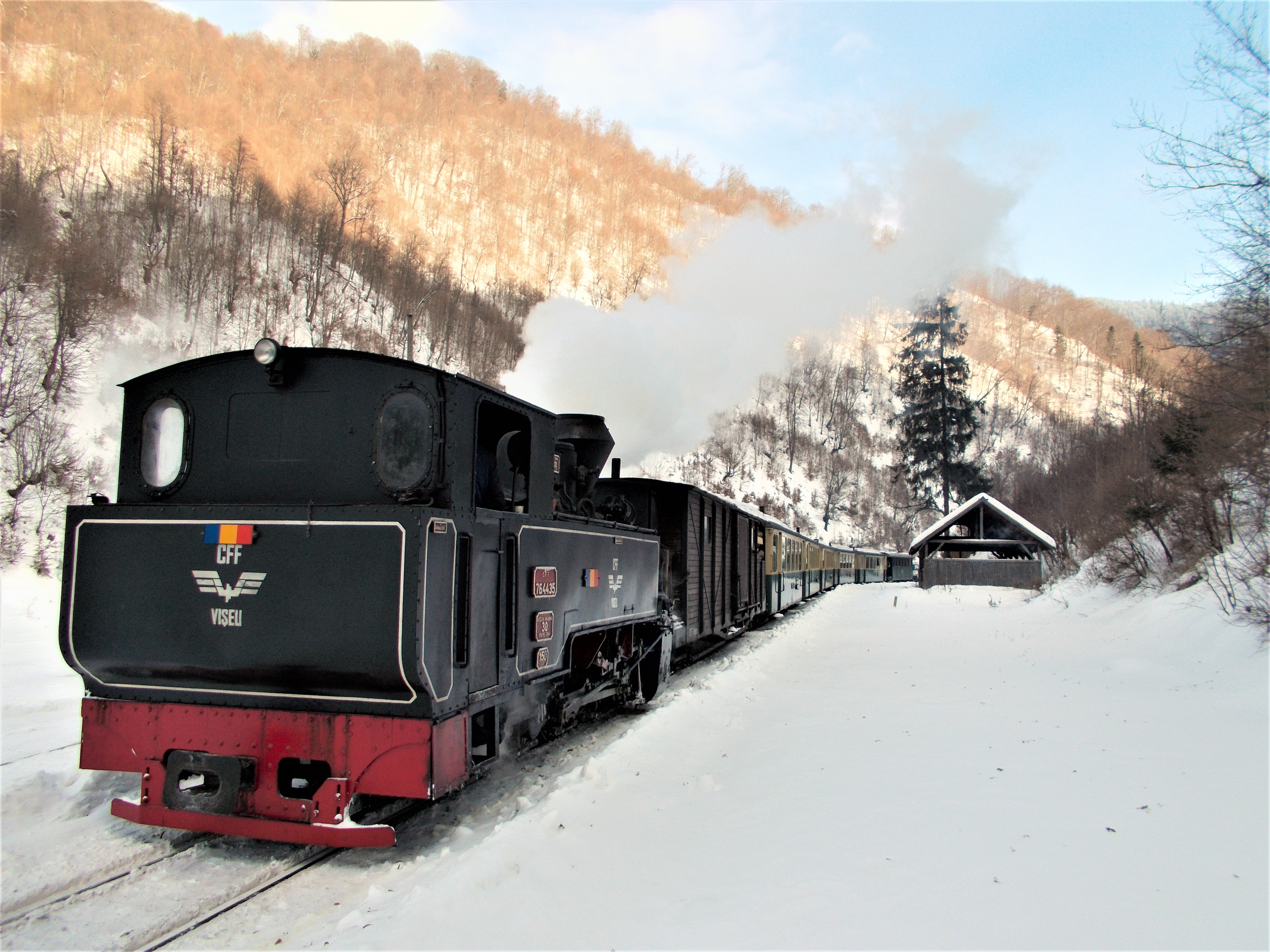

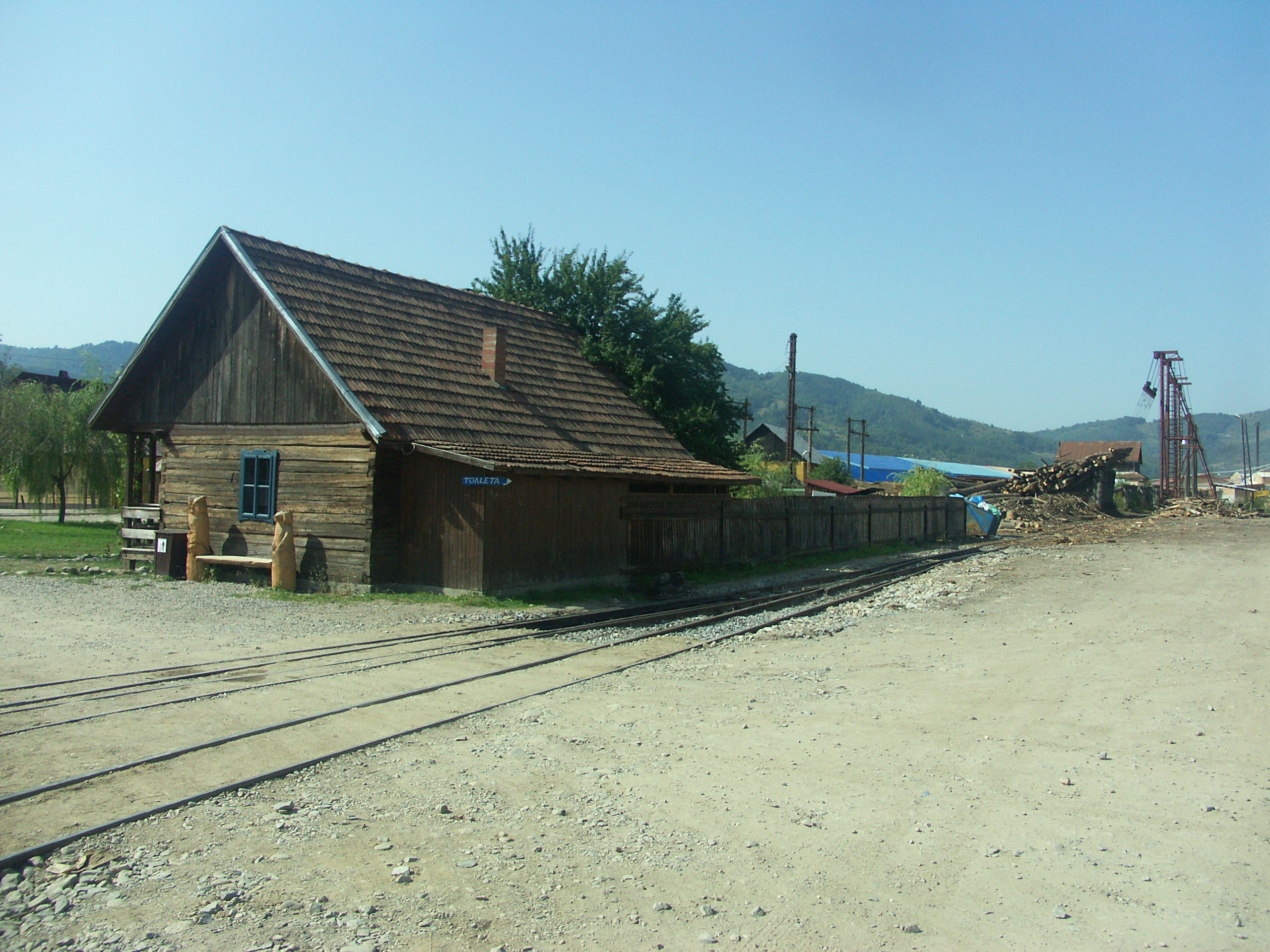
