= David L. Genuth =

Orthodox Jewish rabbi

David Leib Genuth (April 12, 1901 Középvisó, Kingdom of Hungary – February 23, 1974 Shaker Heights, Ohio, United States) was one of Cleveland's most influential Orthodox rabbis for more than 40 years.

== Early life ==
Genuth was the son of Isaac Genuth and Elka Kaner (granddaughter of Rabbi Yehuda Modern, head of the Yeshiva in Sighet). He emigrated to the United States in 1922.

== Education ==
Genuth was a student at the Yeshiva of the Grand Rabbi of Vișeu de Sus before emigrating to the United States in 1922. He continued his studies at the graduate school of Yeshiva University in New York, the Yeshiva in New Haven, Connecticut, and the Yale University Divinity School. Genuth was ordained in 1926.

== Professional life ==
In 1930, Genuth was appointed as the first Rabbi of Beth Israel Synagogue in Norwalk, Connecticut where he was an active supporter of the Norwalk Hospital. In 1931 he moved to Cleveland and in 1933 he was appointed the first rabbi at the Kinsman Jewish Center. At the Kinsman Jewish Center, whose membership included many members of the radical Labor Movement, Genuth created an important congregation by applying a modern view of Orthodoxy.

In 1950, after a disagreement with board members, Genuth left the Kinsman Jewish Center with eight families establishing Temple Beth El which described itself as "egalitarian/traditional" and was particularly notable for its seating of men and women together. The congregation moved into its building on Chagrin Blvd in 1954 - the first synagogue within the city limits of Shaker Heights. Genuth served as Temple Beth El's sole rabbi until his death in 1974.

Throughout the 1930s, Genuth was active with the Orthodox Jewish Children's Home and the Mt. Pleasant Consumptive Ladies Aid Society. Genuth was also active in aiding the United Order of True Sisters, the American Jewish Congress and was an organizer of the Jewish Community Council serving as a representative to its delegate assembly.

Genuth served as chaplain for Jewish patients at Highland View Hospital. He later served on the hospital's chapel building committee which accepted his recommendation for a revolving pulpit to accommodate Jewish patients. Genuth gave monthly lectures at the Montefiore Home.

== Views ==
A lifelong Zionist, Genuth was a member of the Cleveland Zionist Society, attending their first organizing meeting at the behest of Rabbi Abba Hillel Silver, and was an active supporter of the Jewish National Fund and Israel Bonds.

== Personal life ==
Genuth married Anna Einhorn (daughter of Reverend Chaim Einhorn) on February 2, 1929. They had three children. Saul, Phyllis Genuth and Esther. Genuth's parents and two of his three siblings were murdered in the Holocaust. Genuth died on February 23, 1974.
