= Valea Vinului (Vișeu) =

- Location within Romania

Location
- Country: Romania
- Counties: Maramureș County

Physical characteristics
- Mouth: Vișeu
  - coordinates: 47.7226°N 24.3992°E
- Length: 7 km (4.3 mi)
- Basin size: 20 km^{2} (7.7 sq mi)

Basin features
- Progression: Vișeu→ Tisza→ Danube→ Black Sea

The Valea Vinului is a right tributary of the river Vișeu in Romania. It discharges into the Vișeu in Vișeu de Mijloc. Its length is 7 km (4.3 mi) and its basin size is 20 km^{2} (7.7 sq mi).
