= Der Bialistoker Shtern =

Soviet Yiddish-language newspaper (1939–41)

- Founder(s): Zelik Akselrod; Hersh Smolar
- Editor-in-chief: I. Teveliev (October 1939 – February 1940); Beinim Shulman (February–October 1940); B. L. Gantman (October 1940 – June 1941)
- Founded: October 1939
- Ceased publication: June 22, 1941
- Political alignment: Communist Party (Bolshevik) of Byelorussia
- Language: Yiddish
- Headquarters: Białystok
- Country: Soviet Union
- Circulation: 4,000–6,000

Der Bialistoker Shtern (Yiddish: דער ביאליסטאקער שטערן, lit. 'The Białystok Star') was a Yiddish-language newspaper published in Białystok during the period of Soviet rule 1939–1941. It was the sole Jewish newspaper published in the territories of the Second Polish Republic incorporated in 1939 into the Byelorussian SSR (referred to as Western Belorussia or Western Belarus) during this period, and the editorial board of the newspaper became a hub for the Jewish intelligentsia of the city and attracted Jewish refugee writers displaced by the German occupation of Poland. The contents of the newspaper were predominantly translations of Soviet press materials and party editorials, and Jewish-related content to large extent restricted to attacks on Jewish religion and Jewish political parties. The spellings in the newspaper diverged from standard Soviet orthography. Publication of the newspaper was discontinued as Germany attacked the Soviet Union.

== Founding ==
The newspaper began publishing in October 1939. It was an organ of the City and District Committees of the Communist Party (Bolshevik) of Byelorussia and the City and District Executive Committees of Soviets. The party leadership in Minsk had approached Zelik Axelrod, a non-party Jewish writer, regarding publishing a Yiddish newspaper in Białystok. Akselrod managed to locate Hersh Smolar, a Jewish communist cadre who had recently been released from Polish prison in Brest, asking him to join the effort for the launch of the newspaper. The former printing house of Undzer Lebn ('Our Life') was taken over by Der Bialistoker Shtern to serve as its office. Following the Soviet capture of Białystok, a period in which the city received large number of Jewish refugees from Poland, the newspaper played a key role as a significant population could not read and write in any other language than Yiddish. Apart from the short-lived Lvov-based Der Royter Shtern publication ('The Red Star', published for a few weeks in June 1941), Der Bialistoker Shtern was the sole Jewish newspaper in the territories of former eastern Poland. In spite of limited circulation numbers, the newspaper became the mouthpiece towards entire Jewish population in former eastern Poland.

During the Soviet period in 1939–1941, the Białystok city also had a Russian language and a Polish language daily, these two dailies were almost identical in content whilst Der Bialistoker Shtern had a distinct character. The Minsk newspaper Oktyabr ('October') and the Kiev newspaper Der Shtern (´The Star') were also distributed in the Białystok region. The newspaper was initially published daily, but frequency was later reduced.

== Editors and contributors ==
Technically Der Bialistoker Shtern was a continuation of the newspaper Undzer Lebn, which had been founded by Pesach Kaplan in 1918. In Białystok Akselrod and Smolar approached the former members of the Undzer Lebn editorial board, offering them posts as correspondents for the new publication. The former Undzer Lebn editorial board members that joined Der Bialistoker Shtern included Aaron Berezinsky, the poet Mendel Goldman and the journalist Asher Zinowitz, among others. Kaplan, who was barred from joining the editorial board of Der Bialistoker Shtern due to his Zionist leanings, was allowed to contribute to the newspaper under a pen name and his salary would be brought directly to his home by editorial board members. The editorial board of the newspaper emerged as a meeting point for the Jewish intelligentsia in the city as well as Jewish refugee writers (the latter group seeking to be recognized as Soviet writers, which would confer job stability and protection from persecution). Editorial board members included displaced writers from Warsaw; Binem Heller (editor of the sports column), Bernard Ber Mark, (editor of the culture and education column), Dawid Sfard (former secretary of Linke shrayber-grupe in Poland, now a key functionary among displayed Yiddish writers), Dawid Mitzmacher and Dawid Rikhter (who was named deputy managing editor in 1940). Also represented on the editorial board were wristers from Vilna such as Shmuel Dreyer (former deputy editor of Der Tog) and Meyer Pups. Contributors to the newspaper included poets Peretz Markish (from Moscow), Shmerke Kaczerginski, Shalom Zirman, Pesach Binetsky, journalists Leib Strilovsky and Abraham Berakhot, writers I. Yonasewitz, Y. Akrutny and Moishe Knapheys.

I. Teveliev from Minsk served as the first managing editor of Der Bialistoker Shtern. In early February 1940 Beinish Shulman replaced Teveliev as managing editor. B. L. Gantman became the new managing director in early October 1940, a post he would hold until the demise of the newspaper in June 1941.

== Journalistic profile ==
The newspaper mainly carried TASS news stories and party editorials – much of the articles were translations from Russian, Ukrainian or Belarusian. The editors of the newspaper found themselves under pressure to accommodate translations of Soviet press material, leaving little space in the pages of Der Bialistoker Shtern for the some 50 unemployed Jewish displaced writers that had arrived in the city. Initially the newspaper provided space for Jewish refugee writers, but over time they were removed in favour of writers from Moscow, Kiev and Minsk.

Between November 1939 and February 1940 the newspaper ran a campaign, calling on refugees in Western Belorussia to move to the Soviet interior to seek employment there. The newspaper called on refugees to take Soviet citizenship, to oppose black-market activities and to join the Soviet industrial production. The campaign reached its peak in February 1940 with Der Bialistoker Shtern publishing a series of letters from resettled refugees who had taken industrial posts in other parts of the Soviet Union, highlighting satisfaction with living and working conditions in their new abodes.

Distinctly Jewish themes covered in Der Bialistoker Shtern largely focused attacks on Judaism, Shabbat observance and Jewish holidays. Such articles attacking Judaism would usually appear around Jewish holidays. The newspaper carried articles condemning the General Jewish Labour Bund, and occasionally against the Left Poalei Zion and other Zionist organizations. Occasionally the newspaper would carry reports on Jewish community events in Western Belorussia, but such articles would carry a disclaimer absolving the editorial staff of separatist, nationalist or chauvinist deviations.

== Orthography ==
Der Bialistoker Shtern had a unique spelling policy, with Hebrew words spelt according to Soviet orthography but retaining the traditional final form of Hebrew letters. In the final phase of the existence of the newspaper it fully switched to Soviet orthography. In its 191st issue (April 20, 1941) the word Shtern in the banner of the newspaper written with the regular nun letter for the first time, rather than its final form version.

== Decline and outbreak of war ==
Approximately 200 issues of the newspaper was published during the course of 20 months. Der Bialistoker Shtern was printed in between 4,000 and 6,000 copies. Der Bialistoker Shtern was distributed to a very limited extent in Volhynia and Eastern Galicia. Copies generally contained 4 pages, with exceptions for special editions (such as for electoral campaigns or May 5 Soviet Press Day). Over time Der Bialistoker Shtern declined in readership, with many readers shifting to the Minsk newspaper Oktyabr. The format of the newspaper was revised at least thrice, on each occasion the format became smaller than before. Frequency of publishing progressively decreased as well. In 1940 publishing frequency reduced from 7 days a week to 3 days a week. It eventually became a weekly publication.

The final issue of Der Bialistoker Shtern was published on June 22, 1941, the day of the German attack on the Soviet Union. The editorial team plastered copies of the last issue on walls of the deserted streets of the city.
