= Jewish Territorial Organization =

Jewish political movement (1903–1925)

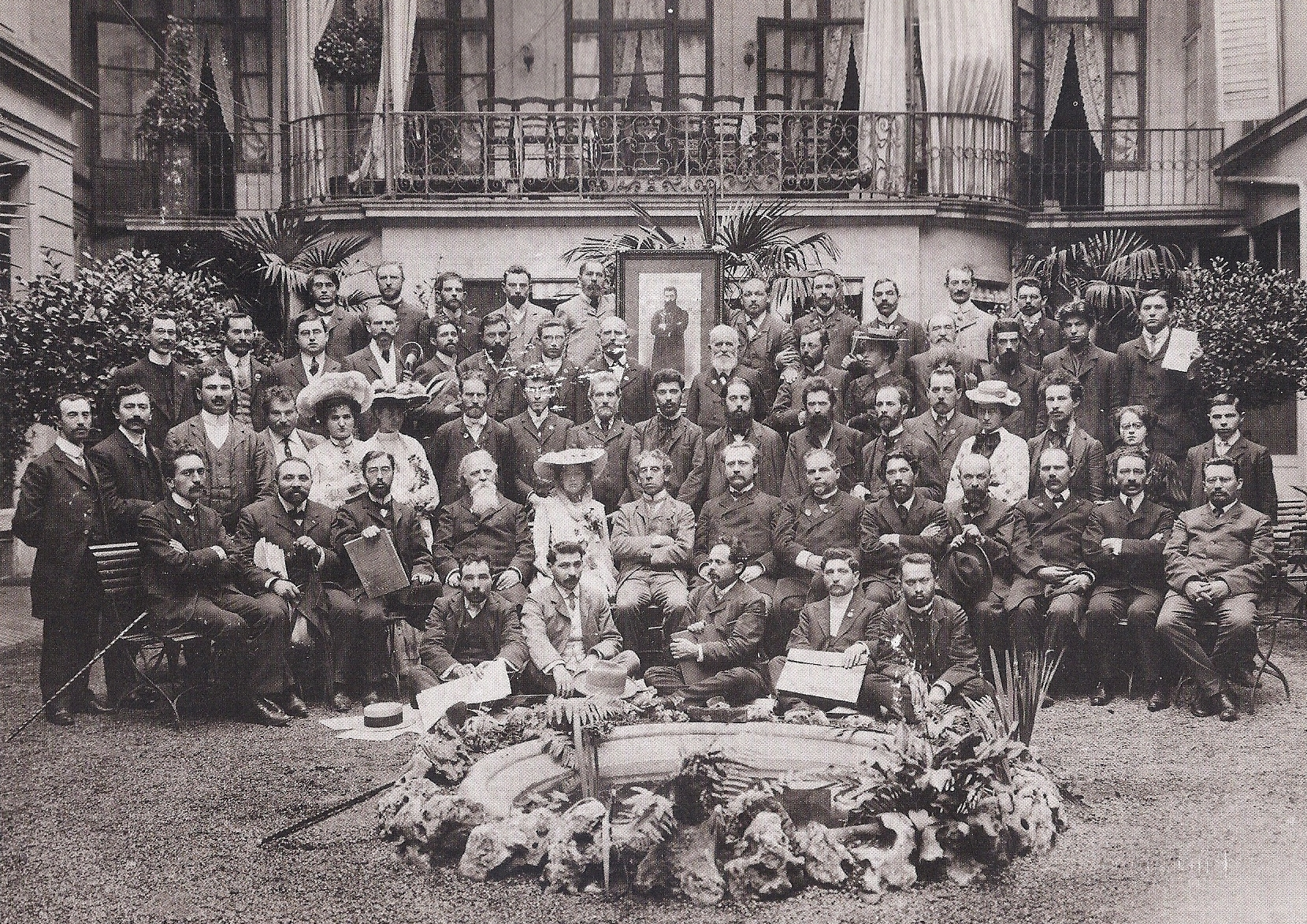
Members of the Jewish Territorial Organization in Basel, Switzerland, 1905

The Jewish Territorial Organisation, known as the ITO, was a Jewish political movement which first arose in 1903 in response to the British Uganda Scheme, but only institutionalized in 1905. Its main goal was to find an alternative territory to that of Palestine, which was preferred by the Zionist movement, for the creation of a Jewish homeland. The organization embraced what became known as Jewish Territorialism, also known as Jewish Statism (not to be confused with the political philosophy of statism). The ITO was dissolved in 1925.

== Overview of territorialism ==
The first instance of what might be termed Territorialism, though the term did not yet exist, much predated Zionism. In 1825 the playwright, diplomat and journalist, Mordecai Manuel Noah—the first Jew born in the United States to reach national prominence—tried to found a Jewish "refuge" at Grand Island in the Niagara River, to be called "Ararat", after Mount Ararat, the Biblical resting place of Noah's Ark. He purchased land on Grand Island—then on the frontier of white settlement—for $4.38 per acre, in order to build a refuge for Jews of all nations. He had brought with him a cornerstone which read "Ararat, a City of Refuge for the Jews, founded by Mordecai M. Noah in the Month of Tishri, 5586 (September, 1825) and in the Fiftieth Year of American Independence." However, the scheme failed to attract Noah's fellow Jews. It began and ended with the ceremonial laying of that cornerstone.

The Jewish Colonization Association, created in 1891 by the Baron Maurice de Hirsch, was aimed at facilitating mass emigration of Jews from the Russian Empire and other Eastern European countries, by settling them in agricultural colonies on lands purchased by the committee, particularly in North and South America (especially Argentina).

Before 1905 some Zionist leaders had seriously considered proposals for Jewish homelands in places other than the Land of Israel. Theodor Herzl hoped for a Jewish homeland in the Land of Israel but recognized that global events demanded an immediate solution to the Jewish problem, in Russia at least, even if that solution required Jewish refugees to settle outside of Eretz Israel. Theodor Herzl's Der Judenstaat argued for a Jewish state in either Palestine, "our ever-memorable historic home", or Argentina, "one of the most fertile countries in the world". Some socialist Zionist groups were more territorialist than Zionist, such as Nachman Syrkin's Zionist Socialist Workers Party (the Z.S.).

As early as 1902, Herzl's negotiations with the Ottoman Empire for a Jewish homeland in Palestine had proven so futile and the dream of Zion so distant that he decided to approach the British about the creation of a Jewish colony in Africa. And in April 1903 his efforts in London seemed to bear fruit. In response to the horrors of Kishinev, Britain's Colonial Secretary, Joseph Chamberlain, proposed to Herzl the creation a semiautonomous region on the Uasin Gishu plateau in British East Africa for Jewish settlement. When Herzl revealed Chamberlain's offer to the Sixth Zionist Congress in August 1903, Israel Zangwill spoke in favor of the proposal. In his speech to the Congress Zangwill made clear that, though he did not see East Africa as the ultimate consummation of the Zionist cause, he did believe that it proved a particularly useful, temporary (if still somewhat long-term) solution to the Jewish problem in Russia.

In 1903 British cabinet ministers suggested the British Uganda Program, land for a Jewish state in "Uganda" (contemporary Kenya). Herzl initially rejected the idea, preferring Palestine, but after the April 1903 Kishinev pogrom Herzl proposed to the Sixth Zionist Congress that the idea be considered as a temporary measure as a home for Russian Jews in danger. Notwithstanding its emergency and temporary nature, the proposal still proved very divisive, and widespread opposition to the plan was demonstrated by a walkout led by the Russian Jewish delegation to the Congress. Few historians believe that such a settlement scheme could have attracted immigrants, Jewish financial support, or international political support. Since there was strong support on the part of some members of the Zionist leadership, however, peace was kept in the movement by the time-honored parliamentary maneuver of voting to establish a committee for the investigation of the possibility, which was not finally dismissed until the Seventh Zionist Congress in 1905.

== History ==
The Jewish Territorial Organization (ITO) was founded by British Jewish author, critic, and activist Israel Zangwill and British Jewish journalist Lucien Wolf in 1903 and institutionalized in 1905. The establishment was a response to the Sixth Congress's rejection of the Uganda proposal, as the ITO led by Zangwill split off from the Zionist movement. It attempted to locate territory suitable for Jewish settlement in various parts of America (e.g. Galveston), and on the African, Asian, and Australian continents, yet with little success.

Zangwill's interest in territorialism began in 1903 in response to the Kishinev Pogrom. In April of that year in Kishinev, Bessarabia, a Western province of the Russian Empire, a local newspaper accused the region's Jews of killing a Christian child as part of their Passover rituals. This inflammatory use of the ancient "blood libel" sparked a three-day pogrom which resulted in the deaths of over forty Jews, as well as the destruction and looting of hundreds of Jewish homes and businesses. The specter of Kishinev profoundly influenced Zangwill's actions and work. Indeed, several years after the event, Zangwill would make the protagonist of his most important play, "The Melting Pot", a survivor of the pogrom who escapes to America after witnessing the murder of his family. The events of Kishinev also convinced Zangwill of the immediate need to find a place of Jewish refuge be it in Palestine or some other site. In commenting on the pogroms in a greeting to the Federation of American Zionists Zangwill commented:

The Kishineff massacre has brought home to the blindest the need of a publicly and legally safeguarded home for our unhappy race. When you come to consider where this centralized home should be you will find no place as practicable as Palestine, or at least for a start, its neighborhood.

But few in the Zionist Organization supported the Uganda Scheme, as the East Africa offer was called, particularly representatives from Eastern Europe who argued that Palestine was the sole acceptable site for a Jewish homeland. Herzl was severely criticized for his willingness to seek a Jewish state outside of the Middle East, and such criticism, Zangwill claimed, contributed to Herzl's death from heart failure in 1904. In a 1905 speech on the East Africa offer he exclaimed:

Herzl is dead: he worked for his people as no man ever worked for them since Judas Maccabaeus. His people called him dreamer and demagogue, and towards the end men of his own party called him traitor and broke his heart. He worked for his people: they paid him his wages and he has gone home.

In 1905, the members of the Seventh Zionist Congress formally rejected the Uganda Scheme. Following the rejection of the East Africa offer, Zangwill contacted Lucien Wolf, an English Jewish journalist and member of the Board of Deputies of British Jews, the main representative body of Anglo Jewry. Wolf was an opponent of political Zionism, but did support the creation of Jewish colonies in the Diaspora. In August 1905 Zangwill and Wolf met to discuss the Uganda Scheme, and in subsequent correspondence between the two we learn that both supported the creation of a Jewish colony in British East Africa. Wolf had objected to any specifically "Jewish national homeland", that is to say a state which ghettoized Jews, preserving Jewish customs and law as the basis for governance. Though Zangwill's literary works suggest his nostalgia for the ghetto, he too recognized the need for a modern Jewish polity. Both concurred that a self-governing Jewish territory should be based on a preponderance of Jews in the region rather than British legislative fiat, and both concurred that the new government should be formed on a modern, democratic basis rather than some earlier biblical ideal or Eastern European Kehilla structure. This basic agreement between Zangwill and Wolf would lead to the formation of the Jewish Territorial Organisation (ITO), an organisation dedicated to "obtaining a large tract of territory (preferably within the British Empire) wherein to found a Jewish Home of Refuge", and to the elevation of Zangwill to the ITO presidency.

The ITO's members were known as territorialists or "ITOmen". ITO attempted to locate territory suitable for Jewish settlement in various parts of America (e.g. Galveston, Texas, Alaska), Africa (in Angola, establishing several contacts with the Portuguese government, the colonial power at the time), Asia, and Australia, but with little success. The Balfour Declaration and the subsequent British occupation of Palestine had made the territorial alternatives to Eretz Israel less viable. Accordingly, in 1925, the ITO was dissolved and most of its members returned to the Zionist movement.

== Other Territorialist organizations ==
=== Zionist Socialist Workers Party ===
In pre-1917 the Zionist Socialist Workers Party also took up the idea, combining it with a strong Socialist Revolutionary orientation, and for a time had a considerable influence among Russian Jews. The party supported Herzl during the debate over the Uganda Scheme.

=== USSR ===
After the October Revolution, among Soviet Jews there was a Territorialist effort in Ukraine, the Crimea (see: Jewish autonomy in Crimea), and then in the region surrounding Birobidzhan, where a Jewish Autonomous Region was established in 1934. The latter Jewish Autonomous Oblast or JAO for short (Russian: Евре́йская автоно́мная о́бласть, Yevreyskaya avtonomnaya oblast; Yiddish: ייִדישע אווטאָנאָמע געגנט, romanized: yidishe avtonome gegnt) still exists in Russia's far east, with both Russian and Yiddish as its official languages. In the United States, the Organization for Jewish Colonization in Russia (known as ICOR) worked to encourage the emigration and settlement of Jews there, likewise with the Gezerd in Australia. Territorialist projects in the USSR ended mostly with the advent of the Great Purge (which saw the dissolution of the Territorialist KOMZET and its agitprop counterpart OZET), and then in their totality following the Holocaust, which saw the destruction of Jewish agricultural colonies in Ukraine and the Crimea. There were attempts to establish Crimea as a Jewish homeland following World War II, which had some support from Vyacheslav Molotov, however such plans were rejected by Stalin who went on to recognise Israel, along with launching another series of political purges against Jewish organisations within the USSR.

=== Freeland League for Jewish Territorial Colonization ===
In the face of the looming Nazi genocide, Isaac Nachman Steinberg established the Freeland League for Jewish Territorial Colonization (Yiddish: "Frayland-lige far Yidisher Teritoryalistisher Kolonizatsye") in London in 1935. This organization attempted, unsuccessfully, to pursue Jewish autonomy by obtaining a large piece of territory in sparsely populated areas in Ecuador, Australia, or Suriname. One of the more well-known ventures was the Kimberley Plan, to secure land in Australia. The Kimberley Plan was officially vetoed on 15 July 1944 by Australian Prime Minister, John Curtin, who informed Steinberg that the Australian government would not "depart from the long-established policy in regard to alien settlement in Australia" and could not "entertain the proposal for a group settlement of the exclusive type contemplated by the Freeland League".

After the establishment of the State of Israel in 1948, Steinberg criticized the exclusivist politics of the Israeli government and continued his attempts to create a non-nationalist Jewish settlement in some other region of the world. After Steinberg's death in 1957, the Freeland League was led by Mordkhe Schaechter, who gradually changed the focus of the organization to more cultural, Yiddishist goals.

== See also ==
- Colonia Lapin
- Free State Project
- Jewish Colonization Association
- Kiryas Joel, New York
- New Square, New York
- Organization for Jewish Colonization in Russia
- Proposals for a Jewish state
