= Der Veker (Minsk) =

Yiddish Newspaper

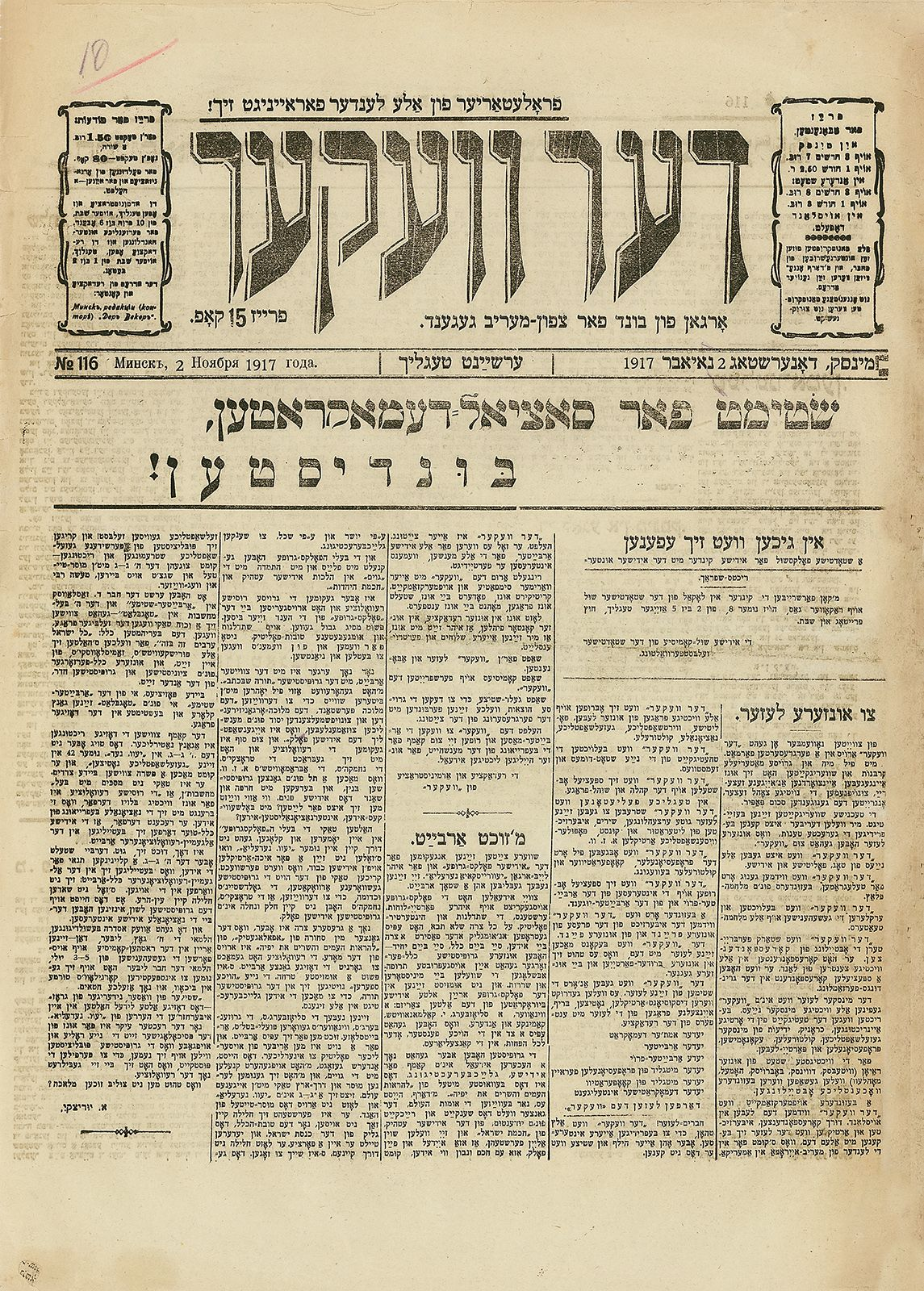
- Founded: May 12, 1917
- Ceased publication: November 7, 1925
- Political alignment: General Jewish Labour Bund (1917-1920); Kombund (1920-1921); Jewish sections of the Communist Party (bolshevik) of Byelorussia (1921-)
- Language: Yiddish
- Headquarters: Minsk
- Country: Soviet Union

Der Veker (Yiddish: דער וועקער, 'The Awakener') was a Yiddish language newspaper published from Minsk 1917–1941. Initially a Bundist publication founded in the midst of the 1917 revolutions, it continued publishing as a Communist Party organ until 1925.

== Bundist newspaper ==
During its first years, Der Veker was an organ of the General Jewish Labour Bund. Der Veker was the first legal bundist newspaper to be published in Minsk. The first issue was published on May 12, 1917. As Yiddish-language publishing bloomed in Minsk in 1917, Der Veker emerged as the most important Yiddish newspaper of the city. Initially it was published thrice weekly, on June 1, 1917, it became a daily newspaper. The name was taken from the Bund organ in Vilna published during the Russian Revolution of 1905.

In the early period, editors of Der Veker included Arn Vaynshteyn, Esther Frumkin and Abraham Kirzhnits. Max Weinreich served as the editor of Der Veker in December 1917. In 1918, the editorship was handed back to Frumkin. As the Red Army seized Minsk in December 1918, Der Veker was the sole Yiddish newspaper of the city that continued to be published.

By March 1921 Der Veker had a circulation of about 5,000. Following the 12th Bund conference, Der Veker became an organ of the Communist Bund (Kombund), albeit published irregularly.

== Communist Party organ ==
As the Communist Bund merged with the Communist Party, Der Veker became the main organ of the Yevsektsiya (Jewish section of the Communist Patrty) in the Byelorussian Soviet Socialist Republic on April 21, 1921. Elye Osherovitsh was named editor in chief of the newspaper in 1922. At this point, the editorial staff was overwhelmingly made up by ex-bundists. At the time, Der Veker was one of three main Yiddish dailies in the soviet republics (together with Der Emes in Moscow and Komunistishe fon in Kiev). In July 1922, the daily circulation of Der Veker was about 2,500. In mid-1922 the Yevsektsiya launched a campaign to increase subscriptions for the newspaper. The Yiddish used in Der Veker was heavily influenced by Russian vocabulary, in contrast to the purist Yiddish used in Der Emes.

On November 7, 1925, on the eighth anniversary of the October Revolution, the newspaper was replaced by Oktyabr ('October'). The name of the new publication was unequivocally Bolshevik, the usage of old bundist names had irked Jewish communist in Belorussia for some time as the Bund and the Jewish communists had a legacy of hostility.
