= Nisn Pups =

Soviet Lithuanian-Jewish revolutionary, journalist and trade unionist

- Nisonas Pupsas
- Born: 1892; Nevarėnai, Kovno Governorate, Russian Empire
- Died: 1978 (aged 86); Vilnius, Lithuanian SSR
- Other names: Meyer Ziv; Mier Pups
- Occupations: Revolutionary; journalist; publicist; trade unionist

Nisn Pups (Lithuanian: Nisonas Pupsas, Russian: Нисон Пупс Yiddish: ניסן פּופּס; 1892 - 1978) was a Soviet Lithuanian-Jewish revolutionary, journalist, publicist and trade unionist. He was known by the party name Meyer Ziv (Russian: Меер Зив, Meer Ziv) from 1921 onwards. In some periods he used combinations of his birth name and party name, going by Meir Pups (Lithuanian: Mejeris Pupsas, Polish: Majer Gerszon Pups).

== Life ==
Nisn Pups was born in 1892 in the small Lithuanian town of Nevarėnai. His father Nochemas Pupsas (Nachim Pups) owned a colonial goods store. His elder brother Isroelis Leibas Pupsas (Isroel Leiba Pups) became a Hebrew-language writer.

During the period of the First World War, he worked as a manual labourer in Riga and Vilna (Vilnius). In Vilna he became involved in journalistic and literary activities, and in 1915 he published a literary anthology on the inhabitants in the Western border region. At the age of 25, Pups was elected as the chairman of the Vilna Professional Union of Trade Employees. He would also become a member of the Central Council of Vilna Trade Unions.

As of 1917 Pups was a member of the Vilna Committee of the General Jewish Labour Bund. When the Vilna Soviet of Workers Deputies was formed in December 1918, Pups was elected as the second secretary of the Presidium of the Soviet.

Pups moved to Kaunas in 1920. In Kaunas he worked as editor and literary contributor of the weekly newspaper Naye tsayt ('New Times'). He was actively involved in the trade union movement in Kaunas. In June 1921 he was elected to the Kaunas City Council, as a candidate on the left-wing workers' list. In August 1921 Pups joined the Communist Party of Lithuania. As a leader in the communist movement, he was noted for his oratory skills. Pups was arrested shortly after becoming a member of the Communist Party. After release from captivity, the party instructed him to change his name to 'Meyer Ziv'. He moved to Germany, where he settled in Berlin and worked at the local branch of the Mezhdunaradnaya Kniga organization.

In 1923 he moved to Moscow. There he spent many years working at the editorial office of Der Emes ('The Truth'). He authored reviews, articles and pamphlets. In 1926 he graduated from the Plekhanov Workers Faculty. As of 1934 he worked on the Vilnius newspaper Kurz ('Brief'). He served on the editorial board of the 1939-1941 newspaper Der Bialistoker Shtern ('The Bialystok Star').

Nisn Pups/Meyer Ziv served in the Soviet army during the Second World War. He contributed to the setting up of the Museum of Jewish Art and Culture, in Vilnius in 1944. Between 1945 and 1948 he worked at the editorial office of the newspaper Eynigkayt ('Unity'), the organ of the Jewish Anti-Fascist Committee. After the closure of Eynigkayt in 1948 he moved back to Vilnius. Between 1967 and 1976 he published a number of stories and essays in the journal Sovetish Heymland ('Soviet Homeland'), Lithuanian-language press and the Warsaw-based publication Folks-shtime ('People's Voice').

In 1977 he was awarded with a Certificate of Merit issued by the Supreme Soviet of the Lithuanian Soviet Socialist Republic on his 85th birthday, in honour of his life work in journalism. Meyer Ziv/Nisn Pups died in Vilnius in 1978, at the age of 86. He was survived by his daughter Ruta Sakowska, a historian on Jewish history.
