= Der shtern =

Soviet Yiddish newspaper

- Founded: November 7, 1918
- Ceased publication: April 1921
- Language: Yiddish
- Country: Byelorussian SSR

Der shtern ('The Star') was a Soviet Yiddish newspaper, first published in Smolensk on November 7, 1918. Der shtern became one of the main Yiddish publications in the early Soviet period. Before the end of the year, as Minsk came under the control of the Soviets, the publication was shifted there. The first issue from Minsk was published on December 27, 1918. It was an organ of the North-Western Regional Committee of the Russian Communist Party (Bolshevik). The editors of the newspaper at the time were M. Kalmanavich and Zalman Khaykin. The newspaper had four pages, in a 36x53 cm format.

== History ==
In January 1919 Der shtern became the organ of the Jewish Communist Party in Belorussia. The editorial committee consisted of Zalman Khaykin, T. Kaplan and G. Sverdlov.

On April 3, 1919 Der shtern began publishing from Vilna, as an organ of the Central Committee of the Communist Party of Lithuania and Belorussia, replacing the Vilna-based newspaper Der Komunist. Publication of Der shtern was discontinued on April 18, 1919, when Vilna was seized by Polish forces. Khaykin, the founding editor of the paper, was killed in battle in Vilna. 12 issues of Der shtern were published from Vilna.

In early May 1919, Der Shtern is, from its 87th issue, again published from Minsk, now as an organ of the Central Committee and the Minsk City Committee of the Komfarband. From August 1919, it becomes an organ of the Central Committee of the Communist Party (bolsheviks) of Lithuania and Belorussia and the Central Bureau of the Yevsektsiya. The editorial committee at the time consisted of R. Weinshtein, G. Sverdlov and A. Shein.

On August 13, 1920, from its 158th issue, the newspaper began publishing from Vitebsk. It was the organ of the Vitebsk Governorate Committee of the Communist Party (bolshevik) of Belorussia and the Vitebsk District Secretariat of the Yevsektsiya. Abruptly, Der shtern was moved back to Minsk, where it was published as an organ of the Central Bureau of the Communist Party (bolshevik) of Belorussia and the Central Bureau of the Yevsektsiya in Belorussia.

In April 1921 Der shtern was replaced by Der Veker, a former bundist newspaper in Minsk, as the main Yiddish publication of the Communist Party (bolshevik) of Belorussia. The last issue of Der shtern was published on April 20, 1921. All in all 596 issues of Der shtern were published.
