= Der shtern (Kharkov) =

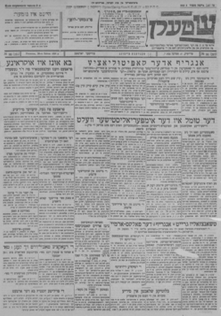
- April 30, 1926 issue of Der shtern
- Founded: May 1925
- Ceased publication: 1941
- Political alignment: Communist
- Language: Yiddish language
- Headquarters: Kharkov
- Circulation: 12,000

Der shtern (Yiddish: דער שטערן, lit. ''The Star'') was a Yiddish language daily newspaper published from Kharkov, Ukrainian SSR between 1925 and 1941. It was an organ of the Central Committee of the Communist Party (bolsheviks) of Ukraine and the All-Ukrainian Council of Trade Unions. M. Levitan served as editor in chief of the newspaper.

Der shtern replaced Komunistishe fon as the main Yiddish newspaper in Soviet Ukraine. The first issue of Der shtern was published in May 1925. In its initial phase Der shtern was the largest Yiddish newspaper in the Soviet Union, as well. It was printed around 12,000 copies, a larger number than that of the Moscow-based Der emes and the Minsk-based Oktyabr combined.

As of January 1928, Der Shtern had a circulation of 9,500 copies, by January 1929 12,600 and by January 1930 the publication had a circulation of 16,700 copies. By the late 1930s Der shtern was one of very few remaining Yiddish newspapers in the Soviet Union.
