= Organization for Jewish Colonization in Russia =

Communist-sponsored mass organization in North America

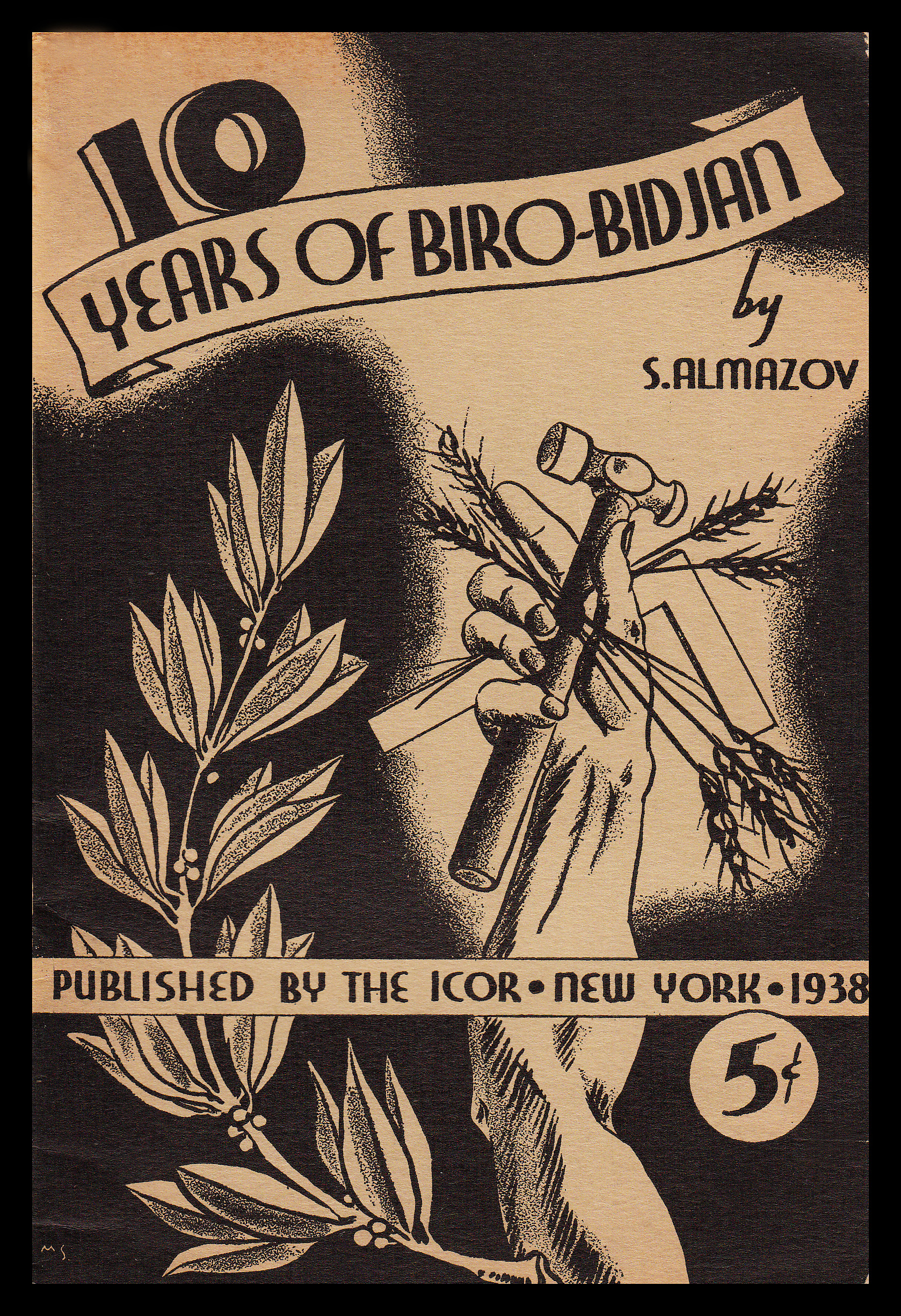
Agrarian and workerist imagery is evident on the cover of this 1938 pamphlet published in New York City by ICOR.

The Organization for Jewish Colonization in Russia (Yiddish: ייִדישע קאָלאָניזאַציע אָרגאַניזאַציע אין רוסלאַנד, Yidishe Kolonizatsye Organizatsye in Rusland), commonly known by its transliterated acronym of ICOR, was a Communist-sponsored mass organization in North America devoted to supporting the settlement of Jews in new collective settlements, firstly in the newly established Ukrainian Soviet Republic and Southern Russia (Stavropol Krai), and latterly in the Jewish Autonomous Oblast in Siberia. The organization was founded in the United States in 1924 and soon spread to Canada.

In 1934 the original ICOR organization was supplemented by a new fundraising and solidarity organization, the American Committee for the Settlement of Jews in Birobidjan (Ambidjan). The two groups merged into a unified organization in 1946.

== Organizational history ==
=== Establishment ===
The founding meeting was held in New York City in December 1924 and the initial mission of the organization was to raise money to fund Jewish collective farms in Crimea and to provide a humanitarian alternative for Jews facing anti-Semitism in Europe. ICOR was motivated by the situation of the Jews of Eastern Europe who had faced decades of pogroms and turmoil (including almost a decade of war) in the Pale of Settlement and constant threat of anti-Semitism in their countries of refuge in Central and Western Europe. Alternatively, the relative safety and welcome in the New World yielded what many saw as a trend towards the dissipation of Jewish culture, language, and "nationality". Originally, the committee worked in partnership with its American contributors and Soviet authorities in order to support the newly founded large Jewish collective farms in the former Pale of Settlement, notably Southern Ukraine and the Crimea. These "kolkhozes" (collective farms) attracted many former shtetl Jews from Ukraine and Belorussia who had previously fled to larger cities for safety, as well as those whose livelihoods had been disrupted in the requisitions and economic restructuring of the early period of Soviet consolidation.

When, in 1928, the Soviet Union abandoned the idea of Jewish settlement in Crimea and endorsed instead the eventual formation of a Jewish Autonomous Republic in the eastern USSR, ICOR followed suit. ICOR worked closely with the Komzet, the Soviet agency facilitating Jewish settlement, and its partner, the OZET.

One of ICOR's initial patrons was Julius Rosenwald, president of Sears, Roebuck and Company who contributed more than $2 million to ICOR. Rosenwald and many other prominent and wealthy American Jews contributed to ICOR's efforts, and their contributions were supplemented by those of working and middle class readers of the Yiddish press in the United States that carried appeals for funding and support.

=== Expansion ===
Yiddish was regarded as the national language of the Jewish people by the Soviet Union and some American ICOR literature was published in bilingual English and Yiddish editions.

The Canadian wing became a separate organization in 1935. The ICOR was active among first and second generation Yiddish-speaking Jewish immigrants and was intended as a rival to the Zionist movement and its agitation for a Jewish homeland in Palestine. In the 1930s the organization was also involved in protests against Nazi Germany and encouraged a boycott of German goods and also fundraised for the International Brigades fighting in the Spanish Civil War.

ICOR was associated with the Communist Party, USA and the Communist Party of Canada and generally followed the Comintern's party line. The organization declined following the signing of the Molotov–Ribbentrop Pact.

=== Ambidjan ===
The American Committee for the Settlement of Jews in Birobidjan (Ambidjan) was established on February 27, 1934, at a meeting held in the Ritz-Carlton Hotel in New York City. The meeting was addressed by Lord Marley, Dudley Leigh Aman, a British Labour Party Member of Parliament and leading spokesman for the Birobidzhan project in the United Kingdom.

The chief American behind the establishment of the new organization was William W. Cohen, a banker and stockbroker who had been a Congressman from New York's 17th Congressional District from 1926 to 1928. Cohen saw the establishment of a Jewish Autonomous Region in the USSR as providing an important "haven for the salvage and rehabilitation of many thousands of Jews suffering in the infernos of central and eastern Europe" and supported the establishment of Ambidjan with his money, time, and effort.

Ambidjan began formal operations in September 1935 with the establishment of an office located at 285 Madison Avenue in New York City. Lord Marley was named honorary president with Cohen the president of the organization.

A key figure behind the scenes at Ambidjan was Jacob M. Budish, a member of the Communist Party USA and employee of Amtorg, the New York-based Soviet foreign trade office in the United States. Budish's close ties with Soviet Ambassador Alexander Troyanovsky and position in the Communist Party apparatus made him the ideal conduit for information to Ambidjan regarding developments in the Soviet Union. In the summer of 1935 Budish travelled to Birobidzhan to tour the region and conduct talks with government officials regarding the future role of Ambidjan.

Following Budish's 1935 talks, Soviet authorities gave Ambidjan permission to proceed with its efforts to subsidize the emigration of European Jews to Birobidzhan. Selection of settlers, primarily from Poland, Lithuania, Romania, and Germany, was to be made by Ambidjan in consultation with Soviet officials. Ambidjan would provide a grant of $350 per family selected to aid in the costs of relocation.

Ambidjan's efforts attracted a wide spectrum of Americans to membership in its ranks, including a substantial contingent from the middle and upper classes, some of whom were non-Jews. Dues in the organization cost $5.

In 1946 ICOR and Ambijan merged to form a unified organization.

=== Dissolution ===
The organization was unable to withstand the anti-Communism of the McCarthy era; moreover, the creation of Israel in 1948 greatly increased the attractiveness of Zionism as offering an alternative for "Jewish Colonization". The organization was dissolved in 1951.

== See also ==
- Society for Settling Toiling Jews on the Land (OZET)
- Committee for the Settlement of Toiling Jews on the Land (KOMZET)
- Gezerd
- History of the Jews in Russia and the Soviet Union
- Jews and Judaism in the Jewish Autonomous Oblast
- Yevsektsiya
- Territorialism
- Jewish Colonization Association
