= Esther Frumkin =

Belarusian Bundist revolutionary and publicist, Soviet politician

- עסטער פרומקין
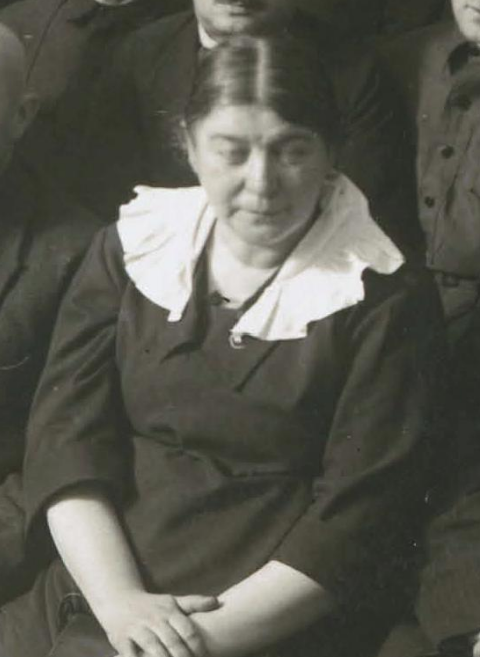
- Frumkin in 1926
- Born: Khaye Malkhe Lifshitz; 1880; Minsk, Minsk Governorate, Russian Empire (now Belarus)
- Died: 8 June 1943 (aged 62–63); Karlag, Kazakh SSR, Soviet Union (now Kazakhstan)

Esther Frumkin (Note: Sometimes known simply as Esther.) (Yiddish: עסטער פרומקין; 1880 – 8 June 1943), born Malkhe Khaye Lifshitz (Note: Yiddish: מלכה חיה ליפשיץ Belarusian: Малка Янкелеўна Ліўшыц, romanized: Malka Jankyelyeǔna Liǔšyc) and also known as Mariya Yakovlevna Frumkina (Note: Russian: Мария Яковлевна Фрумкина Belarusian: Мары́я Я́каўлеўна Фру́мкіна, romanized: Maryja Jakaǔlyeǔna Frumkina), was a Belarusian Bundist revolutionary and publicist and Soviet politician who served as leader of the General Jewish Labour Bund in Lithuania, Poland and Russia, and later of the Yevsektsiya in the Soviet Union. An ardent proponent of the Yiddish language, her political position on Jewish assimilation satisfied neither traditional Jews nor the Soviet leaders.

== Education and family background ==
Khaye Malke Lifshitz was born in 1880 in the city of Minsk, then part of the Russian Empire. A grandfather was a rabbi, as was her first husband. After a second marriage, she was known as Esther Wichmann.

Frumkin's father, Meyer Yankev Lifshitz, was well educated in both secular and classical Jewish studies. He wrote both poetry and prose. Basya, her mother, had family connections that included the Katzenellenbogens and Romms of Vilnius. Both were important families, known for their education, their position within the official Jewish community of Vilnius, and their successful business endeavors. Among other things, Tsvi-Hirsh Katzenellenbogen (1795–1868) supported Jewish social life and artistic talent through the salon he held in his home. One of his more important guests was Avraham Dov Ber Lebensohn (1794–1878), whose poetry written in Hebrew played a role in the revival of it as a modern language. The Romms' publishing house printed books of all genres, in Yiddish as well as Hebrew, and without discriminating among the various religious factions of the time.

Esther was educated at home until the age of 11, studying Hebrew, the Talmud, and texts associated with both the maskilim and Zionist movements of her time. She then attended the gymnasium in Minsk, and went on to study philology and Russian literature at the Pedagogical University in Saint Petersburg. There she came into contact with revolutionary circles, and became familiar with Marxist theory.

== Professional career ==
Frumkin began publishing in 1900, when she was twenty. Before joining the Bund, she was a social democrat. For the Bund she edited various periodicals. In 1910 she published On the Questions of the Yiddish Folkschul, a discussion of pedagogical issues, especially those associated with language instruction. In part an argument in support of the Bund's demand for national-cultural autonomy, it advocated the establishment of secular elementary schools for the children of the Jewish working class with the teaching to be in Yiddish.

In the 1920s, while living in Moscow, she edited the Yevsektsiya's Yiddish newspaper Der Emes (The Truth), which focused on culture and education. Between 1921 and 1936, she was rector of KUNMZ (the Communist University of the National Minorities of the West), also located in Moscow, where she ran an advanced seminar on Leninism. She published a Yiddish biography of Vladimir Lenin as well as an eight-volume anthology of his writings.

In 2018 Suzanne Sarah Faigan completed an annotated bibliography of 357 items as part of the requirements for her Ph.D. She catalogues the variety of material as translations, memoir, didactic party journalism, theory, poetry, and material for young readers; she characterizes Frumkin's tone in these pieces as ranging from moralistic, humorous, derisive, through to emotive, concluding that the work is always clear and well crafted, with a personal quality that made Frumkin's writing popular. Faigan's selection, as she acknowledges, is representative rather than complete.

Frumkin was a successful orator, persuading thousands of people to join the Bund, believe in the value of Yiddish, and to accept the idea of democracy as well as minority rights.

Imprisoned many times by the Tsarist police for her political activities between 1905 and 1917, during 1908 she went into exile in Austria and Switzerland. Later she was sent to Siberia, but she managed to escape and spent WWI in hiding. A victim of the purges of 1936–1938, she died in a detention camp in Kazakhstan and, although the Soviet Union "rehabilitated" her in 1956, the Bund omitted mention of her in its three-volume collection of remembrances of activists begun in 1956 and concluded in 1968.

== Influence on status of Yiddish language ==
Before the late 19th century, among Eastern European Jews (also known as Ashkenazi Jews), Hebrew was the language of Talmudic study and Yiddish was for domestic purposes. As the Zionist movement began to develop in the 19th century, advocates for the revival of Hebrew as a spoken language were beginning to make progress. Meanwhile, Yiddish was considered to be unworthy of respect for educational and other elevated purposes.

In this context, Frumkin took the extraordinary step in 1908 of proposing to the Chernowitz Language Conference that Yiddish should be proclaimed "the national Jewish language." In so doing, following the Bund position on class differences, she opposed Y. L. Peretz, who advocated a united international Jewish organization. The Conference opted only to adopt a resolution including Yiddish as a Jewish language (Hebrew being the other). Nonetheless, the resolution elevated the status of Yiddish to that of other national languages. In the years to follow, educationalists such as Dveyre Kupershteyn and Sofia Gurevitsh were among Jewish educationalists who set up elementary and secondary schools with classes solely in Yiddish, although not necessarily exclusively for working class students.

== Controversy ==
Despite having championed Yiddish, Frumkin is a controversial figure in Jewish history. In A Price below Rubies: Jewish Women as Rebels and Radicals, Naomi Shepherd writes that "no woman was more admired or more hated by Jews under the first phase of Soviet rule; no woman in Eastern Europe achieved such stature in Jewish politics." In fall 2019, the Workmen's Circle offered an online course on Jewish radicals that included Frumkin. Yet she has been associated with antisemitism by writers as divergent as the far-right figure Frank L. Britton, whose The Hoax of Soviet “Anti-Semitism”: Jews, Zionism, Communism, Israel and the Soviet Union 1918–1991 (Ostara Publications) includes Frumkin's "Address on 'National Minorities' to the Second Congress of the Communist International" (1920), and Dara Horn, whose essay "The Cool Kids: Self-mutilation as a Jewish cultural strategy and the sad history of the Yevsektsiya" appears in Tablet: A New Read on Jewish Life.
