= Komfarband of Bielorussia and Lithuania =

The Communist Union of Bielorussia and Lithuania (Yiddish: קאָמוניסטישן פאַרבאַנד פון ווײַסרוסלאַנד און ליטע, Komunistisher farband fun Weisrusland un Lite, usually called Komfarband) was a short-lived Jewish communist organization in Bielorussia. It was founded as the Jewish Communist Party in Bielorussia (Yiddish: אידישער קאָמוניסטישער פארטיי אין ווײַסרוסלאנד) on January 19, 1919. The Jewish Communist Party of Bielorussia functioned as an autonomous unit of the Communist Party (bolsheviks) of Bielorussia.

In the wake of the October Revolution, the issue of the integration of the General Jewish Labour Bund into the communist movement was unsolved. The Russian Communist Party (bolsheviks) (RCP(b)) opposed the notion of an independent Jewish communist movement, preferring territorial communist organizations. The Bund, on the other hand, demanded to retain an autonomous organization, the same demand it had put forth at the time of its entry into the Russian Social Democratic Labour Party.

In Bielorussia, however, conditions were somewhat different. Soviet rule was weaker and there was a division within the Communist Party. Thus the Communist Party (bolsheviks) of Bielorussia (CP(b)B) was more flexible towards cooperation with Jewish socialist groups than the RCP(b) at large. In December, the Kombund (communist faction of the Bund) and the Jewish Section of CP(b)B agreed to set up a joint organization and presented this suggestion to the Central Committee of the CP(b)B. They argued that the Jewish proletarians, due to their 'specific conditions', ought to have a Communist Party of its own albeit in union with the RCP(b). On January 15, 1919, the CP(b)B approved the merger between Kombund and the CP(b)B Jewish Section. Four days later, the Jewish Communist Party of Bielorussia was founded with representatives from both parties forming the Central Committee.

Some 2,000 Bundists joined the new party. Most of the party members were former Bundists. The first party congress was held in Minsk on February 28, 1919. The congress resolved to work for the establishment of an All-Russian Jewish Communist Party, which would function as an autonomous unit of RCP(b). The name was changed to Komfarband (reflecting the creation of the Lithuanian–Belorussian Soviet Socialist Republic) and a new Komfarband Central Committee was elected. Two-thirds of the delegates were former Bundists. Der shtern was the organ of Komfarband.

The RCP(b) did not approve of the Komfarband, and instructed the CP(b)B to eliminate it. On June 26, 1919, the CP(b)B Central Committee issued a memorandum announcing the dissolution of Komfarband.

== See also ==
- Jewish Communist Labour Bund (Ukraine)
- Jewish Communist Labour Bund in Poland
