= Semyon Dimanstein =

Soviet Jewish politician and publisher (1886–1938)

Semyon (Note: Shimen, Russian: Шимен) Markovich Dimanshtein (Russian: Семён Маркович Диманштейн; 21 March 1886 – 25 August 1938) was a Soviet state official, publisher, and leading theorist of national issues in the USSR, and one of the founders of the Soviet Oriental studies. He was considered by the Soviet government to be a representative of Soviet Jews.

Executed during the Great Terror; posthumously rehabilitated.

== Early years ==
Dimanstein was born in Sebezh, Vitebsk Governorate (today Pskov Oblast) in a poor Litvak family. His father, Mordechai, was a tinsmith. From age 12, he studied at the yeshivas of Telz, Slobodka, and Lubavitch. He moved to Vilna in 1903, and was ordained there as a rabbi, receiving smicha from Rabbi Eliyahu Ḥayim Meisel of Lodz, Rabbi Shlomo HaKohen, and Rabbi Chaim Ozer Grodzinski of Vilna. He suffered from poverty and homelessness, and soon abandoned his religious upbringing in favor of revolutionary activities.

== Pre-Revolution Socialist activities ==
In 1904 Dimanstein became a member of the Russian Social Democratic Labour Party in Vilnius. In political debates, he often clashed with the Bund and Zionist parties. After the range of the government repression in 1908, he was sentenced to life settlement in the Irkutsk region. Dimanstein escaped and left the Russian Empire for France until the March Revolution of 1917.

== Party career ==
At that time Russia was at war and Dimanstein was a propagandist of a peace treaty. He was one of the editors of Trench Truth (Окопной правды), a Bolshevik military newspaper in Riga. After the Battle of Riga, he returned to Petrograd and worked in the Central Committee of the Union of Metal Workers. Dimanstein played a significant role during the Bolshevik October Revolution in 1917. In January 1918, he was appointed head of the Commissariat for Jewish National Affairs, and later that year, of the Yevsektsiya. He was a signatory of the “Manifesto of the Provisional Revolutionary Workers Government of Lithuania.” Until the summer of 1919, he served as Commissar of Labor in the short-lived Lithuanian–Byelorussian Soviet Socialist Republic. Between 1918 and 1920, he played a central role in the work of the People's Commissariat of Nationalities. He served for a time as spokesperson for Commissar Joseph Stalin, and edited and contributed many articles to the Commissariat's journal, Zhizn' Natsional'nostei ("Life of the Nationalities"). He was also founder and editor of the Communist Yiddish newspaper Di Varhayt later renamed Der Emes ("The Truth"). He was one of the founders and member of the Committee for the Struggle against Antisemitism within the Soviet government

In 1920 Dimanstein was sent to Bukhara People's Soviet Republic where he established Soviet institutions and supported creation of a local Party-approved elite. He also worked in Tashkent, and as early as July 1920, Dimanstein was a member of the “Turkbureau” central committee. After contracting a severe case of malaria, he was reassigned to party work in Ukraine. In 1922-1924 Dimanstein served as the head of Agitprop of Central Committee of the CP(b)U and as a member of the Ukraine Orgburo.

In 1924 he returned to Moscow and was appointed Deputy Head of Agitprop of the Central Committee of the Communist Party of the Soviet Union. Dimanstein was an editor of New East and Revolution and Nationality ("Революция и национальности"). He was a steady supporter of Stalin's policies. Dimanstein was a founding member of KOMZET, a government agency created in 1924 to promote Jewish agricultural work. His last appointment was as head of the Central Committee of OZET and editor of the OZET's journal, Tribuna.

Dimanstein advocated the establishment of the Jewish Autonomous Oblast in the Russian Far East. In 1930 he published in media against the collectivization of Jewish settlements in Jewish national districts of Southern Ukraine and Northern Crimea. In 1935 Dimanstein was the editor of a propaganda book entitled Yidn in FSSR (Jews in the Soviet Union). From October 1936, Dimanstein was one of the editors of Forpost, a Yiddish journal in the Jewish Autonomous Oblast's capital city of Birobidzhan.

== Death ==
On 21 February 1938, during the Great Purge, Dimanstein was arrested. He received a death sentence on 20 August 1938 and was executed for the charge of belonging to a counterrevolutionary terrorist organization. He was rehabilitated posthumously on 13 August 1955, two years after the death of Stalin.

== Works ==
- Bam Likht fun Komunistisher Ideal, 1919
- Кто такие меньшевики, 1922
- Против укрощения марксизма: К нашим философским спорам, 1923
- Мировая война, 1924
- Прошлое и настоящее : Жизнь народов С.С.С.Р., 1924
- Борьба ленинизма с люксембургианством: Национально-колониальный вопрос, 1933
