= Jewish Communist Labour Bund (Ukraine) =

- Founded: 18 February 1919
- Dissolved: 23 May 1919
- Split from: Jewish Labour Bund
- Merged into: Komfarband
- Ideology: Communism

The Jewish Communist Labour Bund (Yiddish: ײדישער קאמוניסטישנ ארבעטער בונד, 'Idishe Kommunistishe Arbeiter-Bund'), or the Kombund (קאמבונד), was a Jewish Communist political party in Ukraine, formed after a split in the General Jewish Labour Bund (Bund). Moisei Rafes and Aleksandr Chemerisky were the main leaders of the party.

Divisions had simmered within the Bund in Ukraine during the fall of 1918. At a meeting of the Bund branch in Kyiv on 18 February 1919, held on the eve of the Third All-Ukrainian Conference of the Bund, the majority voted for a motion tabled by Rafes whereby the Kyiv branch declared itself the Kyiv branch of the Jewish Communist Labour Bund. Rafes' motion obtained 135 votes, against 79 votes for a motion reaffirming the affiliation with international social democracy and the all-Russian Bund party and 27 abstention. At the end of the vote, the Kyiv Bund branch had split into two separate party organizations. The Kyiv Bundist newspaper Folkstsaytung became the organ of the Kombund on 22 February 1919. Around the same time a similar split occurred in the Ekaterinoslav branch of the Bund (with 130 votes to become part a Kombund, against 108 votes against) in March 1919. The Poltava branch of the Bund voted, almost unanimously, to become part of a Kombund. In Kharkiv two separate meetings were held, at the latter a majority voted to become a Kombund.

The Kombund supported Jewish national autonomy. The Kombund was internally divided on tactics visa-vi the Communist Party. The Kombund wasn't completely committed to the Bolshevik line as such, but supported the Soviet side in the Russian Civil War.

At the Third Conference of the Communist Party (bolsheviks) of Ukraine, held in March 1919, voted to refuse the Kombund 'group entry' into the party (101 voted to refuse the Kombund to merge with the party, 96 votes in favour of a merger). Whilst the CP(b)U recognized the need to collaborate with the Ukrainian Kombund, they refused to recognize the Kombund as a communist party. CP(b)U held that the Kombund was a middle class movement and its members were not given responsibilities in different Soviets. At the local level, the relationship between the Communist Party and the Kombund was often hostile.

In the wake of the Hryhoriev Uprising, the Kombund was given representation in the All-Ukrainian Central Executive Committee. In the midst of the peak of pogroms in central and southern Ukraine, unity talks between the Kombund and the United Jewish Communist Party (the Komfareynikte) intensified. The Yevsektsiya (the Jewish section of the Communist Party) oversaw meetings between the two parties. In May 1919 the Kombund held its first party conference in Kiev. At this conference, on 22 May 1919 the Kombund and the United Jewish Communist Party merged, forming the Jewish Communist Union in Ukraine (Komfarband).

== Seea also ==
- Komfarband of Bielorussia and Lithuania
- Jewish Communist Labour Bund in Poland
