= Folkstsaytung (Kyiv) =

Yiddish newspaper in Ukraine (1917–1919)

Folkstsaytung (Yiddish: פֿאָלקסצייטונג, lit. ''People's Newspaper'') was a Yiddish language newspaper published from Kyiv (Kiev). The first issue of Folkstsaytung was published on August 8, 1917. It was the organ of the South Russia Regional Committee of the General Jewish Labour Bund in Lithuania, Poland and Russia. Moisei Rafes was the editor of the newspaper. From its seventh issue, it appeared as a daily newspaper.

On February 10 (23), 1918 its masthead included the label 'organ of the Bund for Ukraine'. Publication of Folkstsaytung was interrupted on February 13 (26), 1918. On May 28, 1918 the newspaper re-appeared, as the mouthpiece of the General Committee for Ukraine of the Bund. Publication of Folkstsaytung was again halted in January 1919, publication resumed on February 19, 1919. From February 22, 1919 onward it was the organ of the Jewish Communist Labour Bund (Kombund). On May 24, 1919 Folkstsaytung appeared as the organ of the Jewish Communist Union in Ukraine (Komfarband). The editorial college consisted of A. Cheskes, J. Frankel and M. Rafes. However, following the May 24, 1919 issue (no. 269) of Folkstsaytung publication was discontinued as Komunistishe fon ('Communist Banner') replaced Folkstsaytung and the former Fareynikhte newspaper Naye tsayt ('New Times') as the Komfarband organ.
