= May 5 =

May 5 this year in various calendars
- Tuesday, 5 May 2026
Akan	Fobene
Armenian	19 Mareri 1475
Aztec	Xocotlhuetzi 15, 12 Calli
Babylonian	17 Nisanu, 2337 SE
Balinese pawukon	Menga, Pasah, Jaya, Paing, Tungleh, Anggara of Taulu, Kala, Dangu, Suka
Bengali	22 Boisakh, BS 1433
Chinese	Yin Earth Rabbit・Tail Mansion; Fire Horse Year, Month 3, Day 19 (Lixia, 16 days until Xiaoman)
Common Era	5 May 2026 CE
Coptic	27 Parmouti, AM 1742
Egyptian	19 Thoth, 2775 NE
Ethiopian	27 Miyāzyā, 2018 Amätä Məhrät
French Republican	Décade II, Sextidi de Floréal de l'Année 234 de la République
Gregorian	5 May, AD 2026
Hebrew	18 Iyar, AM 5786; Omer 33
Hindu	Jyeṣṭhā・Śiva; Solar: 22 Vaiśākha, 1948 SE; Lunisolar: Caturthī, Kṛishna pakṣa of Vaiśākha, 2083 VE; Rāudra・5127 KY・1,872,700
Icelandic	Þriðjudagur, 13 Harpa 2026
Islamic	18 Dhu al-Qi'dah, AH 1447 (using tabular method)
ISO week date	2026-W19-2
Japanese	19 Yayoi, Reiwa 8 (Rikka, 16 days until Shōman)
Julian	22 April, AD 2026 (AM 7534)
Julian day	2461166
Korean	19 Yongdal, 4359 DE
Maya	13.0.13.10.3; 16 Uo, 12 Akbal
Roman	ante diem X Kalendas Maias, MMDCCLXXIX AUC
Solar Hijri	15 Ordibehesht, SH 1405
Tibetan	19 nag pa, me pho rta 2153 or 1772 or 1000

<<	May					>>
Su	Mo	Tu	We	Th	Fr	Sa
					1	2
3	4	5	6	7	8	9
10	11	12	13	14	15	16
17	18	19	20	21	22	23
24	25	26	27	28	29	30
31
2026

May 5 in recent years
2026 (Tuesday)
2025 (Monday)
2024 (Sunday)
2023 (Friday)
2022 (Thursday)
2021 (Wednesday)
2020 (Tuesday)
2019 (Sunday)
2018 (Saturday)
2017 (Friday)

May 5 is the 125th day of the year (126th in leap years) in the Gregorian calendar; 240 days remain until the end of the year.

== Events ==
=== Pre-1600 ===
- 553 – The Second Council of Constantinople begins.
- 1192 – Queen Isabella I of Jerusalem marries Henry II, Count of Champagne.
- 1215 – Rebel barons renounce their allegiance to King John of England — part of a chain of events leading to the signing of the Magna Carta.
- 1260 – Kublai Khan becomes ruler of the Mongol Empire.
- 1292 – Election of Count Adolf of Nassau as King of the Romans in the Dominican monastery of Frankfurt.
- 1494 – On his second voyage to the New World, Christopher Columbus sights Jamaica, landing at Discovery Bay and declares Jamaica the property of the Spanish crown.

=== 1601–1900 ===
- 1609 – Daimyō (Lord) Shimazu Tadatsune of the Satsuma Domain in southern Kyūshū, Japan, completes his successful invasion of the Ryūkyū Kingdom in Okinawa.
- 1640 – King Charles I of England dissolves the Short Parliament.
- 1654 – Cromwell's Act of Grace, aimed at reconciliation with the Scots, proclaimed in Edinburgh.
- 1762 – Russia and Prussia sign the Treaty of St. Petersburg.
- 1789 – In France, the Estates-General convenes for the first time since 1614.
- 1809 – Mary Kies becomes the first woman awarded a U.S. patent, for a technique of weaving straw with silk and thread.
- 1821 – Emperor Napoleon dies in exile on the island of Saint Helena in the South Atlantic Ocean.
- 1821 – The first edition of The Manchester Guardian, now The Guardian, is published.
- 1835 – The first railway in continental Europe opens between Brussels and Mechelen.
- 1862 – Cinco de Mayo: Troops led by Ignacio Zaragoza halt a French invasion in the Battle of Puebla in Mexico.
- 1864 – American Civil War: The Battle of the Wilderness begins in Spotsylvania County.
- 1865 – American Civil War: The Confederate government is declared dissolved at Washington, Georgia.
- 1866 – Memorial Day first celebrated in United States at Waterloo, New York.
- 1877 – American Indian Wars: Sitting Bull leads his band of Lakota into Canada to avoid harassment by the United States Army under Colonel Nelson Miles.
- 1886 – Workers marching for the eight-hour day in Milwaukee, Wisconsin, are shot at by Wisconsin National Guardsmen in what becomes known as the Bay View Massacre.
- 1887 – The Peruvian Academy of Language is founded.
- 1891 – The Music Hall in New York City (later known as Carnegie Hall) has its grand opening and first public performance, with Tchaikovsky as the guest conductor.

=== 1901–present ===
- 1904 – Pitching against the Philadelphia Athletics at the Huntington Avenue Grounds, Cy Young of the Boston Americans throws the first perfect game in the modern era of baseball.
- 1905 – The trial in the Stratton Brothers case begins in London, England; it marks the first time that fingerprint evidence is used to gain a conviction for murder.
- 1912 – The first issue of the Bolshevik newspaper Pravda is published.
- 1920 – US authorities arrest Nicola Sacco and Bartolomeo Vanzetti for alleged robbery and murder.
- 1930 – The 1930 Bago earthquake, the first of two major earthquakes in southern Burma, kills as many as 7,000 in Yangon and Bago.
- 1936 – March of the Iron Will: Italian troops occupy Addis Ababa, Ethiopia.
- 1940 – World War II: Norwegian campaign: Norwegian squads in Hegra Fortress and Vinjesvingen capitulate to German forces after all other Norwegian forces in southern Norway had laid down their arms.
- 1941 – Emperor Haile Selassie returns to Addis Ababa; the country commemorates the date as Liberation Day or Patriots' Victory Day.
- 1945 – World War II: The Prague uprising begins as an attempt by the Czech resistance to free the city from German occupation.
- 1945 – World War II: A Fu-Go balloon bomb launched by the Japanese Army kills six people near Bly, Oregon.
- 1945 – World War II: Battle of Castle Itter, one of only two battles in that war in which American and German troops fought cooperatively.
- 1946 – The International Military Tribunal for the Far East begins in Tokyo with twenty-eight Japanese military and government officials accused of war crimes and crimes against humanity.
- 1955 – The General Treaty, by which France, Britain and the United States recognize the sovereignty of West Germany, comes into effect.
- 1961 – Project Mercury: Alan Shepard becomes the first American to travel into outer space, on a sub-orbital flight.
- 1964 – The Council of Europe declares May 5 as Europe Day.
- 1972 – Alitalia Flight 112 crashes into Mount Longa near Palermo, Sicily, killing all 115 aboard, making it the deadliest single-aircraft disaster in Italy.
- 1973 – Secretariat wins the 1973 Kentucky Derby in 1:59.4, an as-yet-unbeaten record.
- 1980 – Operation Nimrod: The British Special Air Service storms the Iranian embassy in London after a six-day siege.
- 1981 – Bobby Sands dies in the Long Kesh prison hospital (Northern Ireland) after 66 days of hunger-striking, aged 27.
- 1985 – Ronald Reagan visits the military cemetery at Bitburg and the site of the Bergen-Belsen concentration camp, where he makes a speech.
- 1987 – Iran–Contra affair: Start of Congressional televised hearings in the United States.
- 1991 – A riot breaks out in the Mt. Pleasant section of Washington, D.C. after police shoot a Salvadoran man.
- 1994 – The signing of the Bishkek Protocol between Armenia and Azerbaijan effectively freezes the Nagorno-Karabakh conflict.
- 1994 – American teenager Michael P. Fay is caned in Singapore for theft and vandalism.
- 2006 – The government of Sudan signs an accord with the Sudan Liberation Army.
- 2007 – Kenya Airways Flight 507 crashes after takeoff from Douala International Airport in Douala, Cameroon, killing all 114 aboard, making it the deadliest aircraft disaster in Cameroon.
- 2010 – Mass protests in Greece erupt in response to austerity measures imposed by the government as a result of the Greek government-debt crisis.
- 2023 – The World Health Organization declares the end of the COVID-19 pandemic as a global health emergency.

== Births ==
=== Pre-1600 ===
- 1210 – Afonso III of Portugal (died 1279)
- 1282 – Juan Manuel, Prince of Villena (died 1348)
- 1310 – Preczlaw of Pogarell, Cardinal and Bishop of Wrocław (died 1376)
- 1352 – Rupert of Germany, Count Palatine of the Rhine (died 1410)
- 1479 – Guru Amar Das, Indian 3rd Sikh Guru (died 1574)
- 1504 – Stanislaus Hosius, Polish cardinal (died 1579)
- 1530 – Gabriel de Lorges, Count of Montgomery, French nobleman (died 1574)
- 1542 – Thomas Cecil, 1st Earl of Exeter, English soldier and politician, Lord Lieutenant of Northamptonshire (died 1623)
- 1582 – John Frederick, Duke of Württemberg (died 1628)

=== 1601–1900 ===
- 1684 – Françoise Charlotte d'Aubigné, French wife of Adrien Maurice de Noailles (died 1739)
- 1747 – Leopold II, Holy Roman Emperor (died 1792)
- 1749 – Jean-Frédéric Edelmann, French pianist and composer (died 1794)
- 1764 – Robert Craufurd, Scottish general and politician (died 1812)
- 1800 – Louis Christophe François Hachette, French publisher (died 1864)
- 1813 – Søren Kierkegaard, Danish philosopher and author (died 1855)
- 1818 – Karl Marx, German philosopher, sociologist, and journalist (died 1883)
- 1826 – Eugénie de Montijo, French wife of Napoleon III (died 1920)
- 1830 – John Batterson Stetson, American businessman, founded the John B. Stetson Company (died 1906)
- 1832 – Hubert Howe Bancroft, American ethnologist and historian (died 1918)
- 1833 – Ferdinand von Richthofen, German geographer and academic (died 1905)
- 1834 – Viktor Hartmann, Russian painter and architect (died 1873)
- 1843 – William George Beers, Canadian dentist and patriot (died 1900)
- 1846 – Henryk Sienkiewicz, Polish journalist and author, Nobel Prize laureate (died 1916)
- 1858 – John L. Leal, American physician (died 1914)
- 1859 – Charles B. Hanford, American Shakespearean actor (died 1926)
- 1864 – Nellie Bly, American journalist and author (died 1922)
- 1865 – Helen Maud Merrill, American litterateur and poet (died 1943)
- 1866 – Thomas B. Thrige, Danish businessman (died 1938)
- 1869 – Fabián de la Rosa, Filipino painter and educator (died 1937)
- 1869 – Hans Pfitzner, German composer and conductor (died 1949)
- 1873 – Leon Czolgosz, American assassin of William McKinley (died 1901)
- 1874 – Thomas Bavin, New Zealand-Australian politician, 24th Premier of New South Wales (died 1941)
- 1882 – Sylvia Pankhurst, English women's suffrage movement leader and socialist activist (died 1960)
- 1883 – Archibald Wavell, 1st Earl Wavell, English general and politician, 43rd Governor-General of India (died 1950)
- 1883 – Anna Johnson Pell Wheeler, American mathematician (died 1966)
- 1884 – Chief Bender, American baseball player and coach (died 1954)
- 1889 – Herbie Taylor, South African cricketer and soldier (died 1973)
- 1890 – Christopher Morley, American journalist and author (died 1957)
- 1892 – Dorothy Garrod, British archaeologist (died 1968)
- 1898 – Elsie Eaves, American engineer (died 1983)
- 1898 – Blind Willie McTell, American Piedmont blues singer and guitar player (died 1959)
- 1900 – Helen Redfield, American geneticist (died 1988)

=== 1901–present ===
- 1901 – Janne Mustonen, Finnish politician (died 1964)
- 1903 – James Beard, American chef and author (died 1985)
- 1905 – Floyd Gottfredson, American author and illustrator (died 1986)
- 1907 – Daryna Dmytrivna Polotniuk, Bukovinian (Ukrainian) journalist and author (died 1982)
- 1910 – Leo Lionni, American author and illustrator (died 1999)
- 1911 – Andor Lilienthal, Russian-Hungarian chess player (died 2010)
- 1911 – Pritilata Waddedar, Indian educator and activist (died 1932)
- 1913 – Duane Carter, American race car driver (died 1993)
- 1914 – Tyrone Power, American actor (died 1958)
- 1915 – Alice Faye, American actress and singer (died 1998)
- 1916 – Zail Singh, Indian politician, 7th President of India (died 1994)
- 1919 – Georgios Papadopoulos, Greek colonel and politician, Prime Minister of Greece (died 1999)
- 1921 – Arthur Leonard Schawlow, American physicist and academic, Nobel Prize laureate (died 1999)
- 1922 – Irene Gut Opdyke, Polish nurse and humanitarian (died 2003)
- 1923 – William C. Campbell, American golfer (died 2013)
- 1923 – Cathleen Synge Morawetz, Canadian mathematician (died 2017)
- 1925 – Leo Ryan, American soldier, educator, and politician (died 1978)
- 1927 – Pat Carroll, American actress (died 2022)
- 1929 – Ilene Woods, American actress (died 2010)
- 1932 – Stan Goldberg, American illustrator (died 2014)
- 1933 – Collie Smith, Jamaican cricketer (died 1959)
- 1934 – Henri Konan Bédié, Ivorian politician, 2nd President of Côte d'Ivoire (died 2023)
- 1934 – Victor Garland, Australian accountant and politician, 26th Australian Minister for Veterans' Affairs (died 2022)
- 1935 – Eddie Linden, Scottish poet and magazine editor (died 2023)
- 1935 – Bernard Pivot, French journalist, talk show host, and producer (died 2024)
- 1936 – Sandy Baron, American actor and comedian (died 2001)
- 1937 – Beryl Burton, English racing cyclist (died 1996)
- 1937 – Delia Derbyshire, English musician, arranger and composer (died 2001)
- 1938 – Michael Murphy, American actor
- 1939 – Ray Gosling, English journalist, author, and activist (died 2013)
- 1939 – Bill Watts, American professional wrestler and promoter
- 1940 – Lance Henriksen, American actor
- 1942 – Jean Corston, Baroness Corston, English lawyer and politician
- 1942 – Tammy Wynette, American singer-songwriter and guitarist (died 1998)
- 1943 – Michael Palin, English actor and screenwriter
- 1943 – Ignacio Ramonet, Spanish journalist and author
- 1944 – Bo Larsson, Swedish footballer (died 2023)
- 1944 – John Rhys-Davies, Welsh actor and screenwriter
- 1944 – Roger Rees, Welsh-American actor and director (died 2015)
- 1945 – Kurt Loder, American journalist, author, and critic
- 1946 – Jim Kelly, American actor, athlete, and martial artist (died 2013)
- 1948 – Bill Ward, English drummer and songwriter
- 1950 – Maggie MacNeal, Dutch singer
- 1952 – Ed Lee, American politician and attorney, 43rd Mayor of San Francisco (died 2017)
- 1955 – Jon Butcher, American singer-songwriter, guitarist, and freelance multimedia producer
- 1956 – Steve Scott, American runner and coach
- 1957 – Richard E. Grant, Swazi-English actor, director, and screenwriter
- 1958 – Robert DiPierdomenico, Australian footballer and sportscaster
- 1958 – Vanessa Downing, Australian actress
- 1959 – Bobby Ellsworth, American singer and bass player
- 1959 – Ian McCulloch, English singer-songwriter and guitarist
- 1959 – Brian Williams, American journalist
- 1960 – Doug Hawkins, Australian footballer and sportscaster
- 1961 – Marg Downey, Australian actress
- 1961 – Hiroshi Hase, Japanese wrestler and politician
- 1963 – James LaBrie, Canadian singer-songwriter
- 1964 – Jean-François Copé, French politician, French Minister of Budget
- 1964 – Heike Henkel, German high jumper
- 1966 – Shawn Drover, Canadian drummer
- 1966 – Sergei Stanishev, Bulgarian politician, 46th Prime Minister of Bulgaria
- 1966 – Josh Weinstein, American screenwriter and producer
- 1967 – Adam Hughes, American author and illustrator
- 1967 – Charles Nagy, American baseball player
- 1967 – Alexis Sinduhije, Burundian journalist and politician
- 1971 – Harold Miner, American basketball player
- 1972 – James Cracknell, English rower
- 1972 – Žigmund Pálffy, Slovak ice hockey player
- 1972 – Mikael Renberg, Swedish ice hockey player
- 1975 – Meb Keflezighi, American runner
- 1976 – Dieter Brummer, Australian actor (died 2021)
- 1976 – Juan Pablo Sorín, Argentinian footballer and sportscaster
- 1977 – Tiffany Roberts, American footballer
- 1980 – Yossi Benayoun, Israeli footballer
- 1981 – Craig David, English singer-songwriter, musician and producer
- 1981 – Danielle Fishel, American actress
- 1982 – Vanessa Bryant, American philanthropist and model
- 1982 – Corey Parker, Australian rugby league footballer
- 1983 – James Anyon, English cricketer
- 1983 – Henry Cavill, English actor
- 1985 – Emanuele Giaccherini, Italian footballer
- 1985 – P. J. Tucker, American basketball player
- 1987 – Graham Dorrans, Scottish footballer
- 1988 – Adele, English singer-songwriter
- 1988 – Mervyn Westfield, English cricketer
- 1989 – Agnes Knochenhauer, Swedish curler
- 1990 – Tatiana Schlossberg, American journalist and author (died 2025)
- 1990 – Darcy Kuemper, Canadian ice hockey player
- 1991 – Raúl Jiménez, Mexican footballer
- 1993 – Rickard Rakell, Swedish ice hockey player
- 1994 – Celeste, British singer
- 1994 – Laura Stacey, Canadian ice hockey player
- 1995 – James Conner, American football player
- 1996 – Christopher Eubanks, American tennis player
- 1996 – Mayar Sherif, Egyptian tennis player
- 1997 – Logan Gilbert, American baseball player
- 1997 – Mitch Marner, Canadian hockey player
- 1998 – Aryna Sabalenka, Belarusian tennis player
- 1999 – Nathan Chen, American figure skater
- 1999 – Justin Kluivert, Dutch footballer
- 2001 – Olly, Italian singer-songwriter and rapper
- 2003 – Angelica Bove, Italian singer-songwriter
- 2003 – Carlos Alcaraz, Spanish tennis player
- 2004 – Jenna Davis, American actress and YouTuber
- 2004 – Kirsty Muir, Scottish freestyle skier

== Deaths ==
=== Pre-1600 ===
- 465 – Gerontius, Archbishop of Milan
- 1194 – Casimir II the Just, Polish son of Bolesław III Wrymouth (born 1138)
- 1243 – Hubert de Burgh, 1st Earl of Kent, English justiciar (born c. 1160)
- 1306 – Constantine Palaiologos, Byzantine general (born 1261)
- 1309 – Charles II of Naples (born 1254)
- 1316 – Elizabeth of Rhuddlan, daughter of King Edward I of England (born 1282)
- 1338 – Prince Tsunenaga, son of the Japanese Emperor (born 1324)
- 1380 – Saint Philotheos, Coptic martyr
- 1432 – Francesco Bussone da Carmagnola, Italian adventurer
- 1525 – Frederick III, Elector of Saxony (born 1463)
- 1582 – Charlotte of Bourbon, Princess consort of Orange, married to William I of Orange (born 1547)
- 1586 – Henry Sidney, Irish politician, Lord Deputy of Ireland (born 1529)

=== 1601–1900 ===
- 1671 – Edward Montagu, 2nd Earl of Manchester, English general and politician, Lord Chamberlain of the United Kingdom (born 1602)
- 1672 – Samuel Cooper, English painter and linguist (born 1609)
- 1700 – Angelo Italia, Italian architect (born 1628)
- 1705 – Leopold I, Holy Roman Emperor (born 1640)
- 1714 – Nathaniel Lawrence, English politician (born c. 1627)
- 1760 – Laurence Shirley, 4th Earl Ferrers, English politician (born 1720)
- 1766 – Jean Astruc, French physician and scholar (born 1684)
- 1808 – Pierre Jean George Cabanis, French physiologist and philosopher (born 1757)
- 1821 – Napoleon, French general and emperor (born 1769)
- 1827 – Frederick Augustus I of Saxony (born 1750)
- 1833 – Sophia Campbell, English-Australian painter (born 1777)
- 1855 – Sir Robert Inglis, 2nd Baronet, English politician (born 1786)
- 1859 – Peter Gustav Lejeune Dirichlet, German mathematician and academic (born 1805)
- 1860 – Jean-Charles Prince, Canadian bishop (born 1804)
- 1883 – John O'Shanassy, Irish-Australian politician, 2nd Premier of Victoria (born 1818)
- 1892 – August Wilhelm von Hofmann, German chemist and academic (born 1818)
- 1896 – Silas Adams, American lawyer and politician (born 1839)

=== 1901–present ===
- 1901 – Mariano Ignacio Prado, Peruvian general, twice President of Peru (born 1825)
- 1902 – Bret Harte, American short story writer and poet (born 1836)
- 1907 – Şeker Ahmed Pasha, Turkish soldier and painter (born 1841)
- 1913 – Henry Moret, French painter (born 1856)
- 1916 – John MacBride, executed Irish soldier and rebel (born 1865)
- 1916 – Maurice Raoul-Duval, French polo player (born 1866)
- 1921 – Alfred Hermann Fried, Austrian journalist and publicist, Nobel Prize laureate (born 1864)
- 1924 – A. Sabapathy, Sri Lankan journalist and politician (born 1853)
- 1931 – Glen Kidston, English pilot and racing driver (born 1899)
- 1941 – Platon of Banja Luka, Serbian Orthodox bishop (born 1874)
- 1942 – Qemal Stafa, Albanian politician (born 1920)
- 1947 – Ty LaForest, Canadian-American baseball player (born 1917)
- 1957 – Leopold Löwenheim, German mathematician and logician (born 1878)
- 1959 – Carlos Saavedra Lamas, Argentinian academic and politician, Nobel Prize laureate (born 1878)
- 1962 – Ernest Tyldesley, English cricketer (born 1889)
- 1965 – Nikos Gounaris, Greek tenor and composer (born 1915)
- 1965 – John Waters, American director and screenwriter (born 1893)
- 1971 – Violet Jessop, Argentinean-English nurse (born 1887)
- 1973 – Zekai Özger, Turkish poet and academic (born 1948)
- 1977 – Ludwig Erhard, German economist and politician, Chancellor of Germany (born 1897)
- 1981 – Bobby Sands, PIRA volunteer, died on hunger strike (born 1954)
- 1983 – Horst Schumann, German physician (born 1901)
- 1983 – John Williams, English-American actor (born 1903)
- 1985 – Donald Bailey, English engineer, designed the Bailey bridge (born 1901)
- 1988 – Michael Shaara, American author and academic (born 1928)
- 1993 – Irving Howe, American literary and social critic (born 1920)
- 1994 – Mário Quintana, Brazilian poet and translator (born 1906)
- 1995 – Mikhail Botvinnik, Russian chess player and coach (born 1911)
- 1999 – Vasilis Diamantopoulos, Greek actor, director, and screenwriter (born 1920)
- 2000 – Gino Bartali, Italian cyclist (born 1914)
- 2000 – Bill Musselman, American basketball player and coach (born 1940)
- 2001 – Morris Graves, American painter and educator (born 1910)
- 2001 – Clifton Hillegass, American publisher, created CliffsNotes (born 1918)
- 2002 – Hugo Banzer, Bolivian general and politician, 62nd President of Bolivia (born 1926)
- 2002 – Paul Wilbur Klipsch, American engineer, founded Klipsch Audio Technologies (born 1904)
- 2002 – George Sidney, American director and producer (born 1916)
- 2002 – Louis C. Wyman, American lawyer and politician (born 1917)
- 2003 – Sam Bockarie, Sierra Leonean commander (born 1964)
- 2003 – Walter Sisulu, South African activist and politician (born 1912)
- 2006 – Naushad Ali, Indian composer and producer (born 1919)
- 2006 – Atıf Yılmaz, Turkish director, producer, and screenwriter (born 1925)
- 2007 – Theodore Harold Maiman, American-Canadian physicist and engineer, created the laser (born 1927)
- 2008 – Irv Robbins, Canadian-American businessman, co-founded Baskin-Robbins (born 1917)
- 2008 – Jerry Wallace, American singer and guitarist (born 1928)
- 2010 – Giulietta Simionato, Italian soprano (born 1910)
- 2010 – Umaru Musa Yar'Adua, Nigerian academic and politician, 13th President of Nigeria (born 1951)
- 2011 – Claude Choules, English-Australian soldier (born 1901)
- 2011 – Yosef Merimovich, Israeli footballer and manager (born 1924)
- 2011 – Dana Wynter, British actress (born 1931)
- 2012 – Surendranath, Indian cricketer (born 1937)
- 2012 – Carl Johan Bernadotte, Count of Wisborg (born 1916)
- 2012 – Aatos Erkko, Finnish journalist and publisher (born 1932)
- 2012 – George Knobel, Dutch footballer, coach, and manager (born 1922)
- 2012 – Roy Padayachie, South African lawyer and politician, South African Minister of Communications (born 1950)
- 2013 – Sarah Kirsch, German poet and author (born 1935)
- 2013 – Robert Ressler, American FBI agent and author (born 1937)
- 2014 – Michael Otedola, Nigerian journalist and politician, 9th Governor of Lagos State (born 1926)
- 2015 – Jobst Brandt, American cyclist, engineer, and author (born 1935)
- 2015 – Hans Jansen, Dutch linguist, academic, and politician (born 1942)
- 2017 – Binyamin Elon, Israeli Orthodox rabbi and politician (born 1954)
- 2017 – Ely Ould Mohamed Vall, Mauritanian politician (born 1953)
- 2020 – Millie Small, Jamaican singer-songwriter (born 1947)
- 2024 – Jeannie Epper, American stuntwoman and actress (born 1941)
- 2024 – Bernard Hill, English actor (born 1944)
- 2024 – César Luis Menotti, Argentine footballer and manager (born 1938)
- 2026 – Chris Phelan, Irish-Australian rugby league player (born 1955)

== Holidays and observances ==
- Children's Day (Japan, South Korea)
- Christian feast day:
  - Angelus of Jerusalem
  - Aventinus of Tours
  - Blessed Caterina Cittadini
  - Blessed Edmund Ignatius Rice
  - Frederick the Wise (Lutheran Church–Missouri Synod)
  - Gotthard of Hildesheim
  - Blessed Grzegorz Bolesław Frąckowiak
  - Hilary of Arles
  - Jutta of Kulmsee
  - Stanisław Kazimierczyk
  - May 5 (Eastern Orthodox liturgics)
- Cinco de Mayo (Mexico, United States)
- Constitution Day (Kyrgyzstan)
- Europe Day (Council of Europe)
- Feast of al-Khadr or Saint George (Palestinian)
- Indian Arrival Day (Guyana)
- International Midwives' Day (International)
- Liberation Day (Denmark, Netherlands)
- Lusophone Culture Day (Community of Portuguese Language Countries)
- World Portuguese Language Day (International)
- Martyrs' Day (Albania)
- Missing and Murdered Indigenous Women Awareness Day (Canada and United States)
- National Cartoonist Day
- Patriots' Victory Day (Ethiopia)
- Revenge of the Fifth (see Star Wars Day)
- Senior Citizens Day (Palau)
- Soviet Press Day (Soviet Union)
- Tango no sekku (Japan)
- Uyghur Doppa Cultural Festival (Doppa Day)
