= Komunistishe fon =

Yiddish newspaper in Ukraine (1919–1924)

- Editor: Henekh Kazakevitch
- Founded: 1919
- Ceased publication: 1924
- Political alignment: Jewish sections of the Communist Party of Ukraine
- Language: Yiddish
- Headquarters: Kiev
- Country: Soviet Union

Komunistishe fon (Yiddish: קאָמוניסטישע פֿאָן, lit. ''Communist Banner''), also known as Komfon, was a Soviet Yiddish newspaper published in Kiev 1919–1924. The newspaper was the result of the merger of two previously non-communist newspapers, Naye tsayt of the Fareynikte party and the Folkstsaytung of the Bund party. Kommunistishe fon was the organ of the Komfarband, and later became the organ of the Main Bureau of the Jewish sections of the Communist Party (bolshevik) of Ukraine.

Henekh Kazakevitch was the editor of Komfon. Between the 9th (April 1920) and 10th (March 1921) Party Congresses, 268 issues of Komfon were published. It had a circulation of around 2,000 at the time of the 10th party congress.

Komfon organized live newspaper readings with musical concerts. These events would attract 200–300 workers. Kazakevitch was known as a good public speaker at these events.

For a period, Komfon carried the supplement Di royte arme ('The Red Army'), which was the organ of the Jewish Military Section (an entity working to recruit Jews to regular units of the Red Army).

Komfon was one of two main Soviet Yiddish publications at the time (the other being the Moscow-based Der Emes). It was later replaced by the Kharkov-based Der Shtern.
