= Der Komunist (Vilna) =

Yiddish language daily newspaper

Der Komunist (Yiddish: דער קאָמוניסט, 'The Communist') was a Yiddish language daily newspaper published from Vilna (Vilnius) between December 26, 1918, and April 3, 1919. It was an organ of the Central Committee of the Communist Party of Lithuania and Belorussia. The inaugural issue of Der Komunist was printed completely in red letters. At the time, the editor was Moshe Lunevsky. Semyon Dimanstein was one of the contributors to the newspaper. The newspaper had four pages, in a format of 30x46 cm. Copies of Der Komunist were sold for 10 kopeks.

Der Komunist frequently included attacks on the Zionist movement and different Jewish socialist groups (especially the General Jewish Labour Bund).

Der Komunist fell out of favour with the Central Committee of the Communist Party, who resolved to merge it with Der shtern (a Minsk-based newspaper, whose editorial board was shifted to Vilna). The last issue of Der Komunist, published on April 3, 1919, declared that Der shtern was the new Central Committee organ. In total, 74 issues of Der Komunist were published.
