= Krestianivka =

Krestianivka Крестянівка (Ukrainian) Крестьяновка (Russian) Sırt Caylav (Crimean Tatar)
- Village
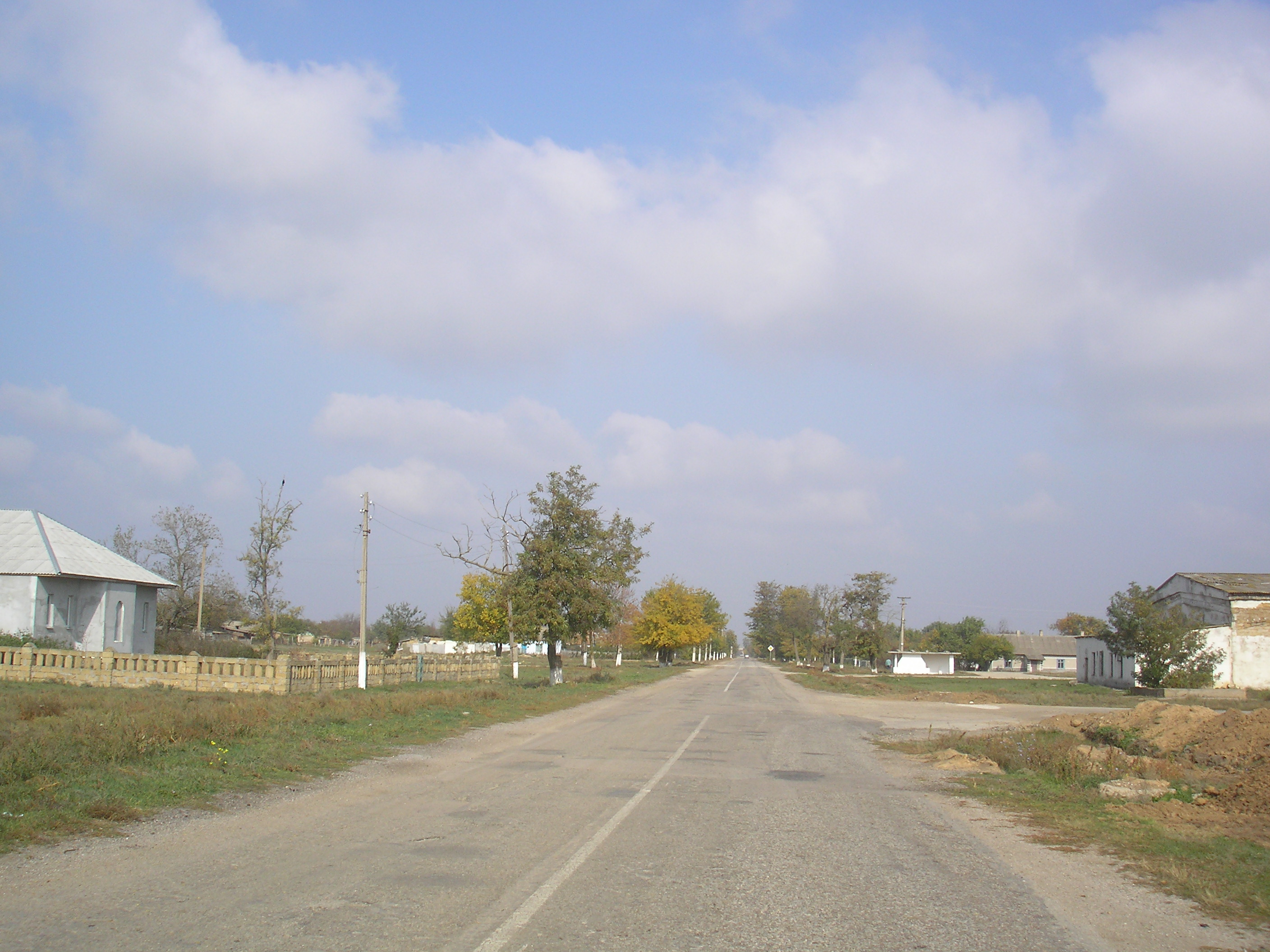
- Interactive map of Krestianivka
- Location of Krestianivka within Crimea Krestianivka (Ukraine) Krestianivka (Black Sea)
- Coordinates: 45°43′22″N 33°56′28″E
- Country: Ukraine (occupied by Russia)
- Autonomous republic: Crimea (de jure)
- Raion: Krasnohvardiiske Raion (de jure)
- Federal subject: Crimea (de facto)

Government
  - Mayor (2010): Roman Bohdanovych Kurtash

Population (2014)
  - Total: 1,623
- Time zone: UTC+3 (MSK)
- Postal code: 96312
- Climate: Cfa

Krestyanivka (Ukrainian: Крестянівка, Russian: Крестьяновка; Crimean Tatar: Sırt Caylav; known as Larindorf until 1945) is a village in the Krasnohvardiiske Raion of the Autonomous Republic of Crimea (Ukraine). Since 2014, the territory has been under Russian occupation and administered by Russia as the Republic of Crimea, though it is internationally recognised as part of Ukraine.

== History ==
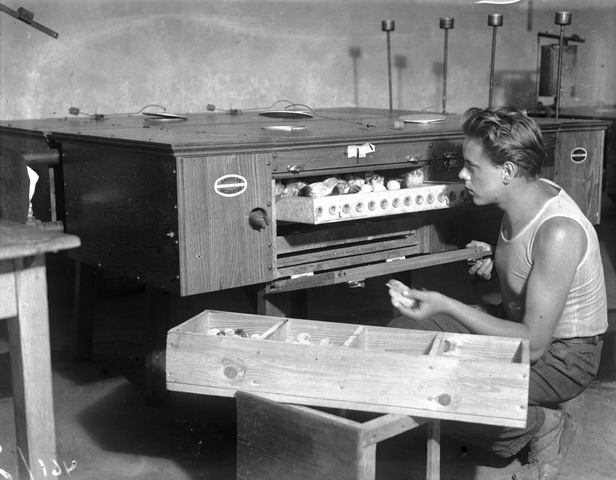
Incubator at the Jewish colony of Krestianivka, 1931

Krestyanivka was founded around 1923 by Jewish settlers under the initial designation Plot No. 62. In the 1926 All-Union Census, the settlement counted 24 inhabitants, all of them Jewish.

During the early 1930s, the village was incorporated into the newly created Jewish national districts of Crimea, first Fraydorf and later Larindorf, which became its administrative center. The name Larindof comes from Yuri Larin, the chairman of the Public Committee for the Land Settlement of Jewish Workers within OZET. According to the 1939 census, the population had grown to 729.

After the German invasion of Crimea, part of the Jewish population was evacuated, while most of those who remained under occupation were executed. In April 1944, 11 Soviet soldiers were killed near the village during the Crimean offensive. A memorial was erected in 1957 and replaced by a new monument in 1979, now classified as a regional cultural heritage site.

By decree of 21 August 1945, Larindorf was renamed Krestianivka. The 1989 census recorded 606 residents.

Since 2014, following the Russian annexation of Crimea, Krestianivka has been administered de facto by the Russian Federation, though the region is internationally recognized as part of Ukraine.

== Demographics ==
As of the 2001 Ukrainian census, Krestianivka had a population of 1,623 inhabitants. In terms of ethnic backgrounds, it is estimated that ethnic Ukrainians constitute a majority in the settlement, followed by large minorities of Crimean Tatars and Russians, as well as smaller groups of Moldovans, Belarusians and Armenians. The linguistic composition of the settlement was as follows:

Native languages in Krestianivka
	percent
Russian	39.2%
Ukrainian	30.7%
Crimean Tatar	26.7%
Romanian	0.6%
Belarusian	0.1%
Armenian	0.1%
others	2.6%
