= United Jewish Communist Workers Party =

Political party in Ukraine

The United Jewish Communist Workers Party was a political party in Ukraine.

The party was born out of a split in the United Jewish Socialist Workers Party (Fareynikhte), as after the February 25, 1919 Third Party Conference the Kiev organization had embraced communism and voiced support for the Bolshevik government. The Kiev communist fareynikhte did however retain the demand for Jewish national personal autonomy, to be expressed through the formation of Jewish soviets to govern Jewish community affairs. On April 8, 1919, the United Jewish Communist Workers Party was established as a separate party. Key leaders of the new party were Yehuda Novakovsky and Mikhail Levitan. The new party sought unity with the Communist Bund. The leadership of the two parties sought to merge with the Communist Party (Bolshevik) of Ukraine, on condition that their members could join en bloc.

By late April 1919 a conference of the party issued a statement addressed to the Communist Party (Bolshevik) of Ukraine protesting the de facto abolition of Jewish autonomy.

In May 1919 the United Jewish Communist Workers Party and the Communist Bund formed a joint commission, to pave the path for a merger of the two parties. Each of the two parties had three representatives on the commission. The commission adopted a platform, that was broadly in line with communist policies but included a demand for setting up separate Jewish sections in the People's Commissariats for Social Welfare and Education. Both parties held parallel conferences in Kiev, adopting resolutions in favour of the platform elaborated by the commission. On May 22, 1919, the two parties formally merged into the Jewish Communist Union in Ukraine (Komfarband).
