= Di Varhayt =

- Political alignment: Communist
- Language: Yiddish
- Headquarters: Petrograd
- Country: Russia

Di Varhayt (The Truth) was a Yiddish language communist newspaper published from Petrograd, today Saint Petersburg, Russia, published by Evkom belonging to the People's Commissariat for Nationalities. The first issue was published on March 8, 1918. Di Varhayt was the first Yiddish communist newspaper in the world. It was however closed down after a very brief existence, as the People's Commissariat was shifted to the new capital Moscow and due to the lack of Yiddish journalists residing in Petrograd. The paper was later restarted the same year as Der Emes.
