= Gezerd =

- Founder: Sender Burstin
- Founded: May 1930
- Dissolved: March 1944
- Succeeded by: Jewish Progressive Council (de facto); Jewish Council to Combat Fascism and Anti-Semitism (de facto)
- Headquarters: Melbourne, Victoria, Australia
- Newspaper: The Gezerd Tribune (1931); Dos Naye Vort / The New Word (1937)
- Membership: ~100 (c.1931) "Several Hundred" (Mid 1933)
- Ideology: Pro-Soviet; Communism; Jewish Territorialism; Settlement of Jews in Birobidzhan
- International affiliation: OZET (parent)

The Gezerd (Note: Short for: Gezelshaft far aynordnen oyf Erd arbetnidke Yidin in F.S.S.R, Yiddish: געזעלשאפט פאר איינארדענען ארבעטנדיקע יידן אויף ערד אין פ.ס.ס.ר English: Society for Settling Toiling Jews on the Land in the USSR) was a communist organisation of Australian Jews that promoted the settlement of Jews in Eastern Siberia, along with pro-Soviet positions. It was active in Melbourne and Sydney. The organisation was co-founded by the recent Polish Jewish immigrant & Bundist Sender Burstin. In its early years it cooperated strongly with the Jewish Labour Bund in Australia; including the formation of a Joint Culture Committee, however the two organisations split over the Molotov-Ribbentrop Pact along with the expelling of Sender Burstin as a "Social-Fascist". The organisation supported the activities of the Soviet Komzet in trying to build an alternative Jewish Homeland in Birobidzhan, working as a local wing of the public relations organisation OZET for this purpose. Towards these ends, it raised some £50 (Australian) within its first year to help with the settlement there, along with a microscope and an x-ray in 1934. The group also maintained strong ties with the Communist Party of Australia, although never formally joined or affiliated with the organisation. Beyond its support of Soviet policies, the group also engaged in yiddish culture events; including founding a "Culture House" in Carlton in 1938 and running a Yiddish theatre troupe between 1932 and 1937, efforts to support the integration of migrants (such Australian history and English language lessons), and events around international policy; especially the rise of fascism. It also supported the international boycott of German goods, and organised meetings against the political violence of the Nazi Regime against "Jews, Catholics, workers, and intellectuals". The group put itself at odds with the traditional Anglo-Jewery of Australia, positioning itself against Religious and ideologically Conservative elements of Australian Jewery: being described as an 'undesirable foreign element' by Newman Rosenthal, right-leaning editor of the Australian Jewish Herald newspaper. The organisation continued despite the liquidation of the Soviet OZET in 1938, apparently not aware of this event.

The aforementioned issues regarding the Molotov-Ribbentrop Pact would cause a decline in membership and public support from which the organisation would never recover. With the banning of the CPA by Prime Minister Menzies in 1940, the organisation voluntarily went underground for roughly 15 months. It re-emerged following the German Invasion of the Soviet Union, however this could not abate its decline. The organisation would dissolve in May 1944.

== See also ==
- Organization for Jewish Colonization in Russia
- OZET
- Komzet
