= Stalindorfer emes =

1930s Yiddish-language publication in Ukraine

- Founded: 1931?
- Political alignment: Communist
- Language: Yiddish language
- Ceased publication: 1940?
- Headquarters: Stalindorf
- OCLC number: 234343234

Stalindorfer emes ('Stalindorf Truth') was a Yiddish language newspaper published from Stalindorf (a Jewish agricultural settlement founded in 1930 in the Ukrainian SSR) throughout the 1930s. Stalindorfer emes was the organ of the Stalindorf raikom of the Communist Party (bolsheviks) of Ukraine, the Stalindorf Raion Executive Community and the Stalindorf Raion Collective Agriculture Union. It was published three times a week.
