= Jewish autonomy in Crimea =

Soviet project,1920s-1930s

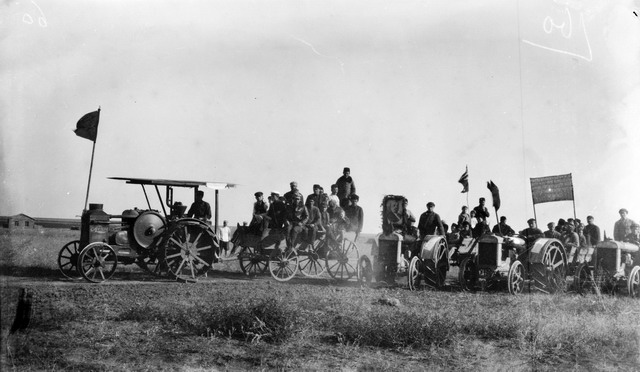
Tractors of an agricultural community near Fraydorf, 1 May 1926

Jewish autonomy in Crimea was a project in the Soviet Union to create an autonomous region for Jews in the Crimean peninsula carried out during the 1920s and 1930s. Following WWII and the creation of the Jewish Autonomous Oblast in the Far East, the project was abandoned, despite the existence of more than 80 kolkhozes and an attempt to renew the project in 1944 by the Jewish Anti-Fascist Committee.

== Background ==
Crimea historically possessed a large Jewish population, including Krymchaks and the non-Rabbinic Jewish Crimean Karaites.

The first Jewish agricultural colonies in the Russian Empire began to appear during the early 19th century in the Bessarabia, Kherson, Podolia, Taurida, and Yekaterinoslav Governorates. However, efforts to expand these settlements were opposed by Tsar Alexander II, who signed an ukase on 30 May 1886 against it. The status of these colonies was subsequently worsened by pogroms, the Russian Civil War, the Russian famine of 1921–1922, and general outbreaks of disease, leading to the destruction of several colonies. Additionally, many Jews living in these colonies chose to migrate to larger cities or other countries, such as the United States, altogether. By 1926, shtetls in the Pale of Settlement had halved in population compared to before the Russian Civil War.

== Agrarianisation ==
The abolition of the Pale of Settlement by the Alexander Kerensky's Russian Provisional Government in 1917 allowed a large number of Jews to move throughout Russia. With the October Revolution and the Russian Civil War, large portions of Russian Jewry were deprived of their livelihoods (which tended to be small crafts, trade, and finances).

Zionist organisations began their activities in Crimea with the intention of creating centres of agricultural work for future Jewish migrants in 1919. Population decline, both as a result of pogroms and refugees, was a significant issue; the Jewish population of Crimea had decreased from 50,043 in 1921 to 45,503 in 1923 (including 39,815 Rabbinic Jews and 5,688 Karaites). From 1922 to 1924, the Zionist HeHalutz movement established four agricultural communes in Crimea, including 300 people. These communes would not last long, however, being liquidated by Soviet authorities in the late 1920s.

These events, coupled with the Russian famine of 1921–22, led to the growth of the idea of "agrarianisation" of Jews among Bolshevik leadership. In order to achieve this, however, it was necessary to resettle Jews in empty land, so as not to upset non-Jewish peasants.

Following victory in the civil war (and even beforehand), Vladimir Lenin began to pursue the agrarianisation policy. The primary goal of the Jewish Commissariat of the People's Commissariat for Nationalities, or YevKom, was to find an area suitable for Jewish settlement. To organise this effort, in August 1924 the Committee for the Settlement of Toiling Jews on the Land, or Komzet, was established under Pyotr Smidovich. In December of that year, the similarly named Society for Settling Toiling Jews on the Land, or OZET was established under Yuri Larin.

== Southern Project ==
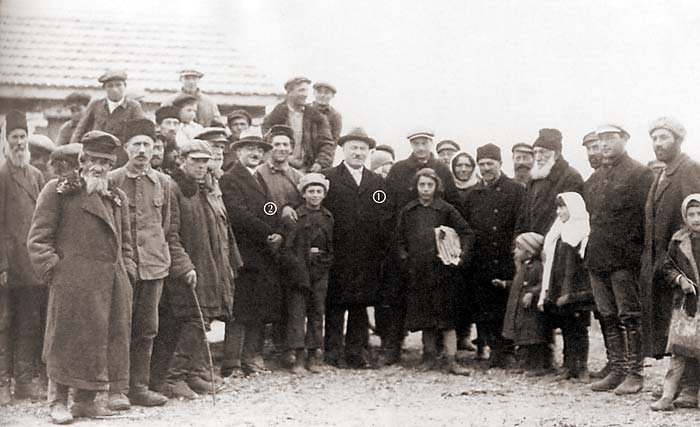
Delegation of Agro-Joint in the village of Ikor (now Romashkino), 1928

Joseph A. Rosen, director of the American Jewish Joint Distribution Committee, commonly known simply as the Joint, is considered to be the author of the proposal for Jewish settlement in Crimea. However, officially, journalist Abram Bragin and Grigory Broydo, then-deputy People's Commissar for Nationalities, developed the plan. In December 1923, per the decision of the Politburo, a special commission was created with Alexander Tsiurupa. Among the politicians who supported it were Nikolai Bukharin, Georgy Chicherin, Mikhail Kalinin, Lev Kamenev and Leon Trotsky.

In July 1924, the Joint established an organisation, known as the Agro-Joint, to assist the project. Rosen promised 15 million United States dollars on the condition that the persecution of Zionism, Judaism, and Jewish culture in the Soviet Union was ended. By December of the same year, the Soviet government had agreed. The agreement was renewed twice; once, for a three-year period, in December 1927, and once, until 1953, in February 1929. 9 million dollars were provided to the Soviet government for the purpose of assisting Jewish settlement in Crimea for 17 years at 5% yearly interest.

The Southern Project, however, was not without its opposition; Aleksandr Petrovich Smirnov, People's Commissar for Agriculture of the Russian SFSR, declared that it was unfair to non-Jewish working peoples, a sentiment agreed with by Mykola Skrypnyk, People's Commissar of Justice of the Ukrainian SSR, and Emanuel Kviring, General Secretary of Communist Party of Ukraine. The local government of the Crimean ASSR, headed by Veli İbraimov, also staunchly opposed the project, arguing that the land should instead be redistributed to Crimean Tatar peasants, and that the repatriation of Crimean Tatars who had fled to Turkey should take precedence over taking in Jewish migrants. In opposing a resolution by the Central Committee lecturing the Crimean ASSR for not following their instructions in redistribution of land, İbraimov stated, "As for shortcomings in land management, I believe that the norms in Crimea are correct and scientifically substantiated, but they need to be revised only in the interests of Jewish resettlement on the peninsula." Following İbraimov's 1928 execution, however, opposition within the government ceased.

On 13 October 1930, the Fraydorf Jewish National Raion was created, with a total population of roughly 30,000 people, of whom around 35% were Jews. This was followed up in 1935 by the creation of Larindorf Raion, which had a roughly 63.5% Jewish population.

Jewish colonies of the Southern Project
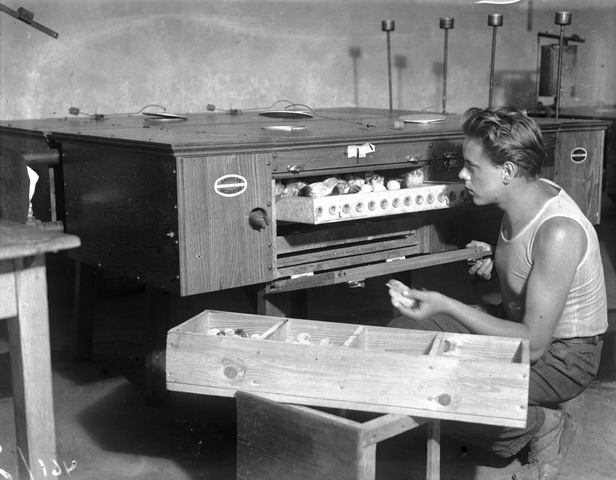
Incubator at Krestianivka, 1931

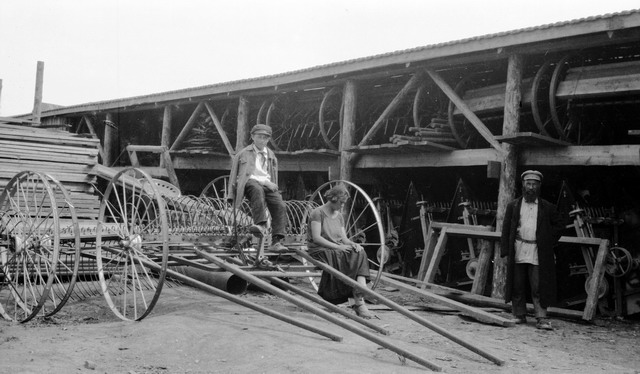
An OZET inventory base in Dzhankoi Raion, 1926

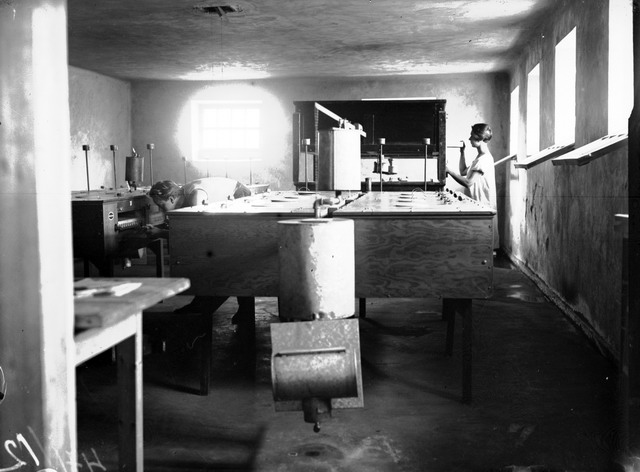
Incubation room at Krestianivka, 1931

However, the Southern Project had been usurped by another Jewish autonomous project in 1928; the Birobidzhan Jewish National Raion (now known as the Jewish Autonomous Oblast). According to Russian historian Gennady Kostyrchenko, the reason that Birobidzhan was prioritised over Crimea was due to a desire to not agitate landless peasants in southern Ukraine, who felt resentment towards Jews due to them being given precedence. Though never officially cancelled due to the need to continue receiving aid from the Joint, the Southern Project reached its zenith in 1930.

== Jewish Anti-Fascist Committee proposal ==
Though the Southern Project had effectively died prior to World War II, the Jewish Anti-Fascist Committee (JAC) had not forgotten it. According to Kortyrchenko, in summer 1943, during a trip to the United States, Solomon Mikhoels and Itzik Feffer acquired permission from Vyacheslav Molotov to negotiate material support for Jewish resettlement in Crimea after the peninsula (then under the occupation of Nazi Germany) was retaken by the Soviet Union.

On 15 February 1944, Mikhoels, Feffer, and Shakne Epshtein, in a letter edited by Solomon Lozovsky, sent a leader to Soviet leader Joseph Stalin, requesting that he create a Jewish Soviet Socialist Republic in the Crimean peninsula. They argued that Jews were unwilling to return to areas they historically inhabited, such as Belarus and Ukraine proper, where Jews were slaughtered en masse as part of the Holocaust, as well as that preserving the Jewish intelligentsia was necessary in the face of their decline among the upper strata of national republics and prevention of new outbreaks of antisemitism. At the same time, the existing Jewish Autonomous Oblast in Birobidzhan was rejected by the JAC on the grounds of its incredible distance from the "main Jewish labour masses". Despite the pleas of the JAC, however, the proposal was ultimately rejected by the Central Committee.

The project of Jewish autonomy in Crimea died for the final time in 1948. Both during the trial of Lozovsky and the trial which ultimately led to the Night of the Murdered Poets, the defendants were accused of "conspiring on how to fulfil the plan of American capitalist circles to create a Jewish state in Crimea." At the final plenum of the Central Committee during Stalin's lifetime, in October 1952, Stalin castigated Molotov for his support of the JAC plan, saying, "Molotov is a person devoted to our cause. If called to do so, I have no doubt he will unhesitatingly give his life for the party. But one cannot ignore his unworthy deeds [...] What is the value of Molotov's proposal to transfer Crimea to the Jews? This is comrade Molotov's grossest political mistake [...] On what basis did comrade Molotov make such a proposal? We have Jewish autonomy [in Birobidzhan]. Is that not enough? Let this republic develop. And comrade Molotov should not be a lawyer for illegal Jewish claims to our Soviet Crimea."

== See also ==
- Jews on Land
- The Jewish Steppe
- Organization for Jewish Colonization in Russia
