= Nevarėnai =

- Town
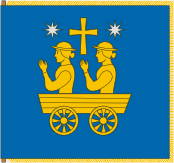
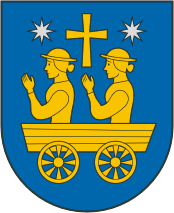
- Flag Seal

- Location within Lithuania
- Coordinates: 56°6′40″N 22°16′59″E
- Country: Lithuania
- County: Telšiai County
- Municipality: Telšiai district municipality
- Eldership: Nevarėnai eldership

Population (2011)
  - Total: 552
- Time zone: UTC+2 (EET)
  - Summer (DST): UTC+3 (EEST)

Nevarėnai (Samogitian: Nevarienā, Polish: Nieworany) is a town in Telšiai County, Lithuania. According to the 2011 census, the town has a population of 552 people.

== History ==
During the Second World War, 150 Jews from the town were massacred in mass executions perpetrated by an einsatzgruppen.
