= Soviet Press Day =

Soviet holiday

1962 Soviet Press Day poster of Qizil O‘zbekiston newspaper. Title reads "Glory to Lenin's Pravda".

The Soviet Press Day (Russian: День советской печати) was an annual observance in the Soviet Union, celebrated on May 5. The celebration was done in commemoration of the publishing of the first issue of the Bolshevik newspaper Pravda on 5 May [O.S. 22 April] 1912. Soviet Press Day was instituted in 1922 in connection with the tenth anniversary of the founding of Pravda, on decision by the Central Committee of the Russian Communist Party (Bolsheviks) and by approval of the 11th Party Congress.
