= Der royter shtern (Lvov) =

Defunct Yiddish newspaper

- Founded: June 1, 1941
- Political alignment: Communist Party (Bolsheviks) of Ukraine
- Language: Yiddish
- Headquarters: Lvov
- Country: Soviet Union

Der royter shtern (Yiddish: דער רויטער שטערנ, lit. ''The Red Star'') was a Yiddish language daily newspaper published in Lvov for a brief period in 1941. The first issue came out on June 1, 1941. Published daily, it was an organ of the Lvov District and City Committees of the Communist Party (Bolsheviks) of Ukraine and the Lvov District Soviet of Workers Deputies. Copies were sold at 15 kopeks. Per Levin (1995) Hersfeld was the editor of the newspaper, and 'Gordon' or 'Gadon' the deputy editor.

The publication lasted for about three weeks, the newspaper stopped publishing at the onset of the German invasion of the Soviet Union.
