= Jewish Communist Union in Ukraine =

The Jewish Communist Union in Ukraine (Yiddish: אידישער קאמוניסטישער פארבאנד אויף אוקראינע), also known as Komfarband (קאמפארבאנד), was a Jewish communist political party in Ukraine. Komfarband was formed on May 22, 1919, through the merger of the Jewish Communist Labour Bund (Kombund) and the United Jewish Communist Party (Komfareynikte). The Komfarband had some 4,000 members. Moisei Rafes and Mikhail Levitan were key leaders of Komfarband. The newspaper Komunistishe fon was the organ of Komfarband. Komfarband had three members in the All-Ukrainian Central Executive Committee of Soviets.

On July 4, 1919 the Central Committee of Komfarband sent a memorandum to the Ukrainian People's Commissariat for Internal Affairs, urging it to shut down Zionist political organizations and their related educational and cultural institutions. The memorandum was followed by a crackdown on the Zionist leadership in Ukraine. A few days later, commenting on the offensive against the Zionists, Rafes stated that the actions had been taken on the initiative of the Jewish communists and that the actions was an expression of 'Jewish civil war' and 'concretization of the dictatorship of the proletariat on the 'Jewish street'.'

On July 16, 1919 Komfarband held a party conference in Kiev, which requested a merger with the Communist Party (bolshevik) of Ukraine. Komfarband sought to be recognized as an autonomous Jewish organization within the CP(b)U. The CP(b)U rejected this request, but by mid-August 1919 allowed individual members of Komfarband to become party members. Komfarband members took active part in the struggle against Anton Denikin's White Army in August 1919. 1,757 former members of the Komfarband joined the CP(b)U in 1919. Komunistishe fon became the organ of the Jewish sections of the CP(b)U.
