= National Cartoonist Day =

Worldwide celebration of cartoonists

May 5th is National Cartoonist Day, a world-wide celebration of cartoonists and their work. The National Cartoonist Society declared the date in the 1990s to promote support for the cartooning industry, and to recognize the impact they have had on society. The establishment of the Day was spearheaded by co-chairpersons Polly Keener and Ken Alvine of the National Cartoonists Day Committee.

National Cartoonist Day honors those who create both the print comics and animated cartoons.

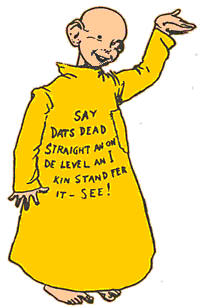
The Yellow Kid

The date of May 5th was chosen to recognize the first appearance (in color) of the mischievous cartoon character "The Yellow Kid" in the New York World newspaper on May 5, 1895. The character was created by comic strip artist Richard F. Outcault, and was featured in his cartoon titled "At the Circus in Hogan's Alley".

== See also ==
- Cartoon
- Comic strip
- Editorial cartoon
