= Sofia Gurevitsh =

Belarusian Jewish educator

- Born: 1880; Minsk, Minsk Governorate, Russian Empire
- Died: 1942 (aged 61–62); Gorki, Russian SFSR, Soviet Union
- Occupation: Yiddish educator
- Known for: Founder of Sofia Gurevitsh Gimnazye

Sofia Gurevitsh (1880–1942) was a Belarusian Jewish educator.

She was the founder of the Sofia Gurevitsh Gimnazye, an academy (secondary school) in Vilnius that promoted the use of Yiddish as a respected language for all purposes, including education.

== Biography ==
Born in Minsk, her father was a lumber merchant, wealthy enough to send her to a school for aristocratic women in St Petersburg, Russia where she studied pedagogy and natural sciences. She taught in Russian schools near Vitebsk before moving to Vilna in 1905 (according to Katz; Harshav says 1902).

At that time Vilna had begun to support a number of Yiddish schools at various levels. Along with Gurevitsh, Dveyre Kupershteyn (also known as Deborah Cooperstein; 1854–1939) also established a girls' school that originally taught in Russian before making what was then a bold switch in 1920 to teach entirely in Yiddish. Her school at first offered only four grades before expanding to offer another four. In contrast, Gurevitsh's academy began as a high school for Jewish girls at a time when this was a novelty. After World War I, when it was one of two Yiddish high schools in Vilna, the academy became a co-educational institution.

Gurevitsh's academy produced many students who survived World War II and who worked as academicians, artists, librarians, authors, and educators in Israel, the United States, and Lithuania itself. One of them, Aaron Garon, wrote a memoir about the academy, entitled “Sófye Gurévitsh un ir vílner gimnázye” ("Sofia Gurevich and her Vilna Academy"), that was published in 1995 in Oxford Yiddish 3; he credited Gurevitsh along with his parents for his achievements. Another student, Benjamin Harshav, who taught at Yale University, discusses the academy in an oral history as part of the Wexler Oral History Project; his mother, who had taught at the school, took it over when Gurevitsh was forced to leave.

In the 1930s Vilna came under Polish control and Yiddish educational establishments in general were banned. Gurevitsh in particular was banned because she did not speak Polish. She left Vilna for Russia, where she had two brothers who were senior officials in the Ministry for Heavy Industry. She died in Gorki.

== See also ==
- Profile on Gurevitsh and photo
