= Komzet =

Soviet Jewish organization

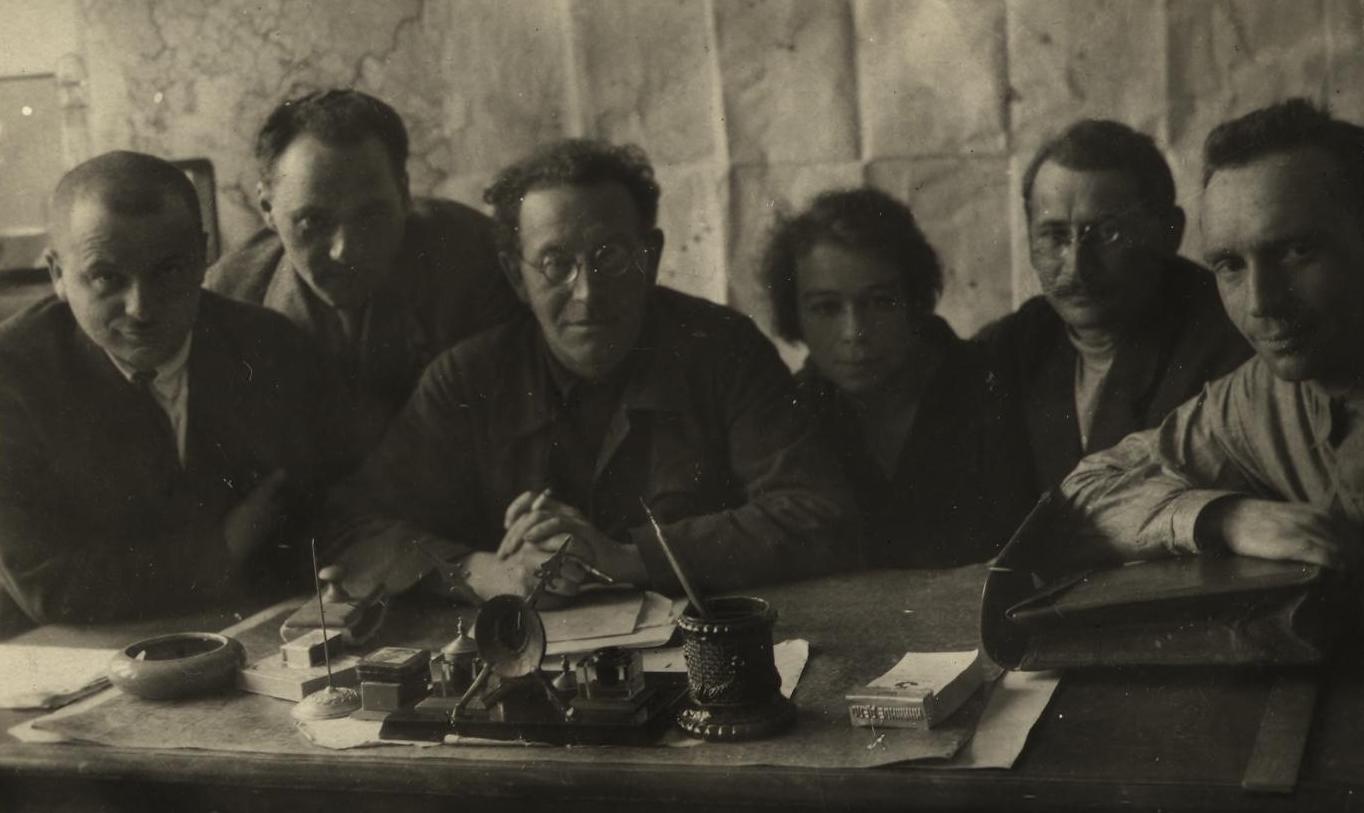
Komzet members of Birobidzhan in 1930

Komzet (Russian: Комитет по земельному устройству еврейских трудящихся, КОМЗЕТ) was the Committee for the Settlement of Toiling Jews on the Land (some English sources use the word "working" instead of "toiling") in the Soviet Union. The primary goal of the Komzet was to provide work for the unemployed agricultural Jewish population of the country.

== Function ==
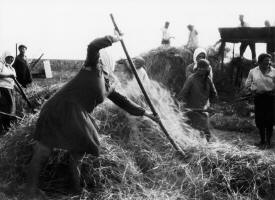
Threshing in the fields in a Jewish kolkhoz, c. 1930

The Komzet was a government committee whose function was to contribute and distribute the land for new kolkhozes. A complementary public society, the OZET was established in order to assist in moving settlers to a new location, housebuilding, irrigation, training, providing them with cattle and agricultural tools, education, medical and cultural services. The funds were to be provided by private donations, charities and lotteries.

== History ==
In 1924–1926, the Komzet helped to create several Jewish kolkhozes in various regions, most notably in Crimea, Ukraine and Stavropol region.

In 1927, following a failed attempt to establish Jewish autonomy in Crimea, the Birsko-Bidzhansky region in the Russian Far East was identified as a territory suitable for compact living of the Soviet Jews. The region was chosen for settlement due to tensions on the sparsely populated China-Russia border. The region would become the Jewish Autonomous Oblast. It did not attract the expected mass Jewish resettlement.

The first chairman of the Komzet was Pyotr Smidovich (1924–1935) who was succeeded by Sergey Chutskaev (1935–1938).

Komzet was abolished in 1938, after end of the Soviet policy of korenizatsiia.

== See also ==
- Organization for Jewish Colonisation in the Soviet Union (IKOR)
- Society for Settling Toiling Jews on the Land (OZET)
- Gezerd
- History of the Jews in Russia and the Soviet Union
- Jews and Judaism in the Jewish Autonomous Oblast
- American Jewish Joint Distribution Committee
- Yevsektsiya
