= OZET =

Soviet Jewish association

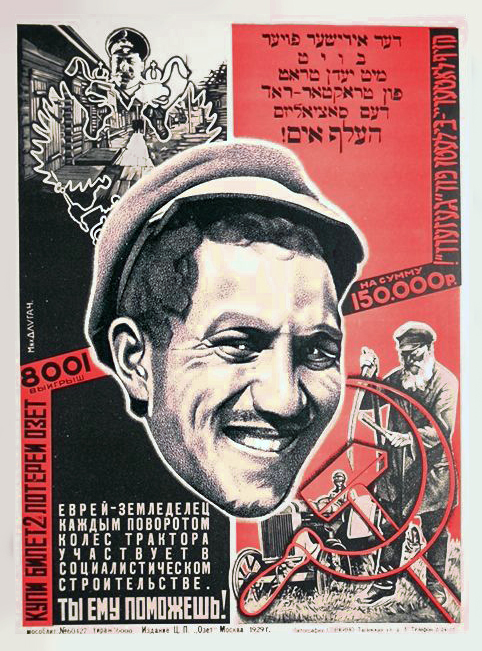
OZET poster in Russian and Yiddish (1929): "A Jewish landworker with every turn of the wheels of a tractor takes part in the building of socialism and you will help him. Buy a ticket for the OZET lottery."

OZET (Russian: ОЗЕТ, Общество землеустройства еврейских трудящихся romanised: Obshchestvo zemleustroystva yevreyskikh trudyashchikhsya, Yiddish: געזעלשאפט פאר איינארדענען ארבעטנדיקע יידן אויף ערד אין פ.ס.ס.ר romanised: Gezelshaft far aynordnen oyf Erd arbetnidke Yidin in F.S.S.R) was the public Society for Settling Toiling Jews on the Land in the Soviet Union in the period from 1925 to 1938. Some English sources use the word "Working" instead of "Toiling".

== Background ==
The principal sources of livelihood of the Jews in the Russian Empire were trade and small crafts. After the October Revolution, the Russian Civil War and instability and devastation that followed, these traditional occupations withered. Dictatorship of proletariat, War Communism and command economy were accompanied by persecution of those deemed class enemies or exploiters. As a result, in the early 1920s more than a third of the Jewish population of the USSR were officially counted as lishenets, disenfranchised people. A significant part of the population of shtetls (a small town with a large Jewish population in Central and Eastern Europe until the Holocaust), in former Pale of Settlement moved to big cities.

== Tasks and leadership ==
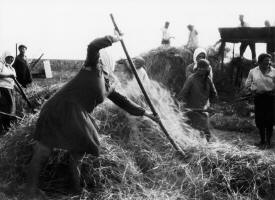
Threshing in the fields in a Jewish kolkhoz, c. 1930

In order to resolve socio-economic difficulties of the Russian Jews and promote agricultural labour among them, on January 17, 1925, the CPSU formally created a government committee, the Komzet, and a complementary public society, the OZET.

While the land for new kolkhozes was contributed and distributed by the Soviet government via the Komzet, the job of the OZET was assisting the transfer of settlers to a new location, housebuilding, irrigation, training, providing them with cattle and agricultural tools, education, medical and cultural services. The funds were to be provided by private donations, charities and lotteries.

The OZET was headed by respected Jewish Old Bolsheviks, not all of them Jewish: Yuri Larin, and later Semyon Dimanstein, and its board included such figures as Solomon Mikhoels, Vladimir Mayakovsky and Viktor Shklovsky.

== Geography and membership ==
Unlike many Soviet organizations of the time, there was no requirement for a member to be of proletarian ancestry. By the time of its first assembly in Moscow in 1926, the OZET counted over 60,000 members. At its height in the 1930s, it reached 300,000, but in many cases the membership was mandatory and/or formal.

By the end of 1920s, there were 160 Jewish selsoviets (rural councils) in Ukraine, 29 in Crimea (then part of the Russian SFSR), and 27 in Belarus. In Ukraine, three Jewish national regions were created: Kalinindorf, Stalindorf and Novo-Zlatopol. Crimea had two: Fraydorf and Larindorf.

The Jewish settlers were given around 5,000 square kilometres of land (not counting Birobidzhan). The plan was to settle 500,000 "toiling Jews" in ten years, and to establish Jewish autonomy in Crimea. In reality, from 1925 to 1937 only 126,000 were resettled, and only 53,000 of them stayed.

In Feb. 1928, the OZET's activity in the European part of the USSR was put on hold in favour of implementing the Birobidzhan project in the Russian Far East and the JAO was created.

== Propaganda and funding ==
In order to mobilize public opinion, the OZET undertook significant propaganda efforts in the West. Almost uniquely in the history of the USSR, it officially declared that it was not politically or ideologically affiliated. In November 1925 it even passed a resolution declaring its neutrality towards Zionism, officially branded as a bourgeois nationalist movement.

Until the 1930s, OZET was often represented in Soviet pavilions at international exhibitions and fairs. This won the USSR many supporters in the West. One particular success was the film A Jew on the Land («Еврей на земле») directed by Abram Room and authored by Mayakovsky and Viktor Shklovsky.

The American Jewish Joint Distribution Committee (Joint) alone contributed $25 million to the OZET, and established Agro-Joint, an organization specifically dedicated to the project. It is unclear how much of the collected funds was spent on further public relations campaigns, diverted to other projects, or pocketed by the government bureaucracy in the USSR, but the settlers were frequently left without necessities and had to survive by improvising.

In Australia a pro-OZET organisation existed called the Gezerd (a contraction of the OZET's name in Yiddish). It was co-founded by Australian Bundist Sender Burstin, who was eventually kicked out of the organisation for political disagreements. It would end up dissolving in 1944 as support for the project dried up in favour of Zionist, Bundist, and direct Communist organisations.

Likewise there was also a Gezerd in South Africa, which published a paper called Gezerdvort (Word of the Gezerd) that called for Jews to "shake off the harmful and illusory dream of establishing a 'National Home' in Palestine through an alliance with British Imperialism".

=== OZET-lottery ===
Ticket for the first OZET lottery, printed in 1927 for the 1928 drawing.

In total there were five lottery drawings: in 1928, 1929, 1931, 1932 and 1933.

== Birobidzhan project ==
The Birobidzhan project appeared in 1928. By 1932, out of 20,000 settlers only 7,000 remained and by 1938 the Jewish Autonomous Oblast (JAO) hosted 20,000 Jews constituting 25% of the total population.

To increase the prestige of settling the Far East, the Soviet government raised the status of the autonomy and in 1934 JAO was declared an autonomous republic; the city of Birobidzhan became its capital and it was to become the centre of Jewish culture.

== Demise ==
The first five year plans, intensive industrialization and militarization programs in the USSR required educated human resources and many Jews were able to find employment. On the other hand, collectivization in the USSR resulted in the failure of Soviet agriculture and many starving peasants of all ethnic backgrounds found escape in cities.

By the mid-1930s, the OZET had lost its usefulness. In 1937, its leadership and ranks were decimated in the Great Purge and in May 1938 the agency was liquidated by special order by the Central Committee of the CPSU as a "corner of various counter-revolutionary Bundist elements, turncoats and spies". International contacts, including the Agro-Joint, were discontinued. In 1938, Jewish national regions, councils, and schools were closed.

== See also ==
- Organization for Jewish Colonisation in the Soviet Union (IKOR)
- Committee for the Settlement of Toiling Jews on the Land (KOMZET)
- History of the Jews in Russia and the Soviet Union
- Jews and Judaism in the Jewish Autonomous Oblast
- American Jewish Joint Distribution Committee
- Gezerd
- Stalindorfer emes
