= Oktyabr (Yiddish newspaper) =

Defunct Yiddish newspaper

- Founded: November 7, 1925
- Ceased publication: June 1941
- Political alignment: Communist Party (bolshevik) of Byelorussia
- Language: Yiddish
- Headquarters: Minsk
- Country: Soviet Union

Oktyabr (Yiddish: אקטיאבער, 'October'), was a Yiddish language newspaper published in Minsk from 1917 to 1941.

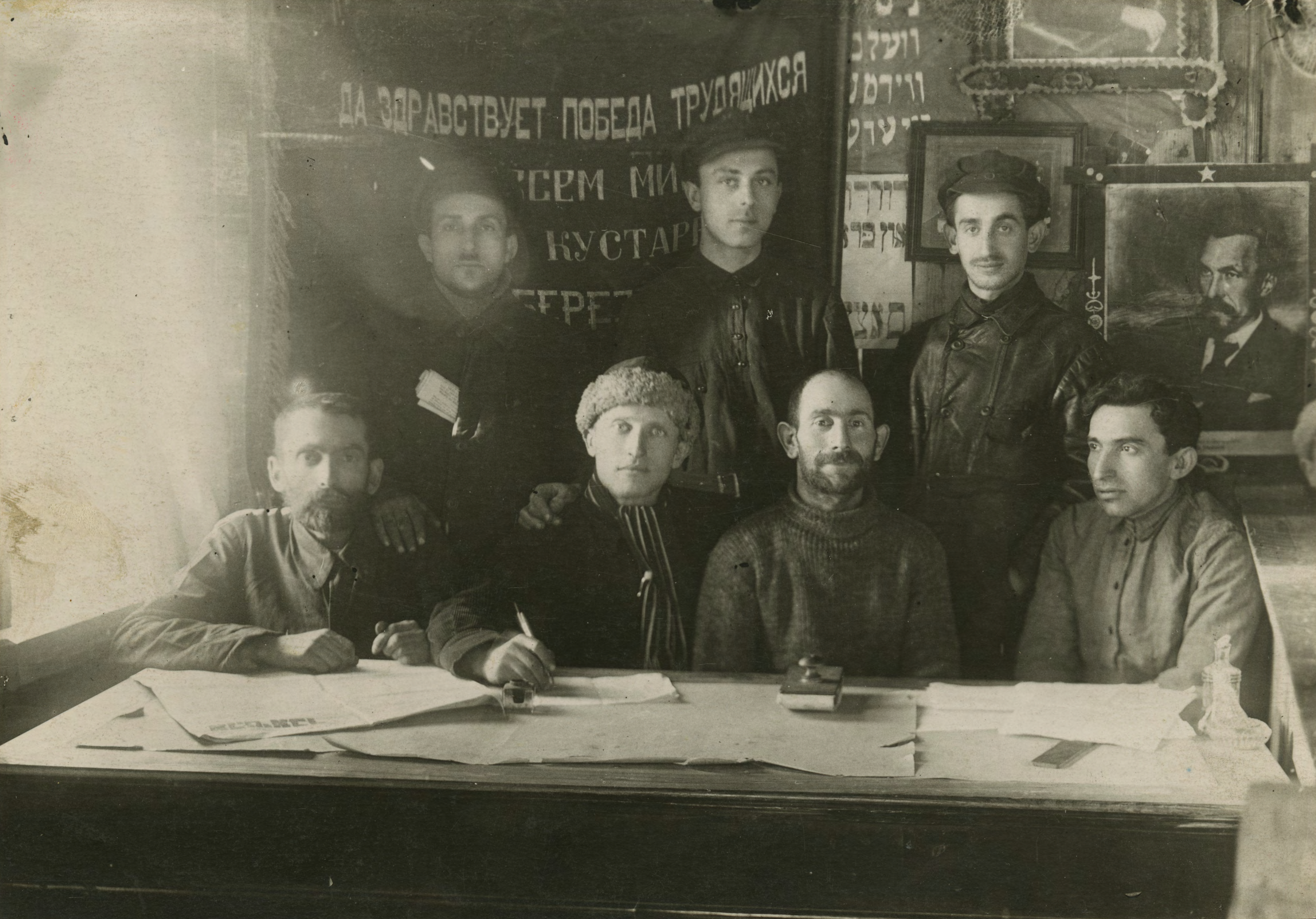
Oktyabr's managing committee c. 1925

Oktyabr was launched on November 7, 1925, on the eighth anniversary of the October Revolution, replacing the ex-Bundist newspaper Der Veker. The name of the new publication was unequivocally Bolshevik, in contrast with the Bundist legacy of Der Veker. As of 1925 Oktyabr had a circulation of 4,139, by 1926 it stood at 6,400 and by 1927 its circulation stood at 7,150, higher than any of the Belarusian language party organs. Publishing of Oktyabr continued until the German invasion of the Soviet Union.
