= Der Emes =

Soviet newspaper in Yiddish

- Founded: August 7, 1918
- Ceased publication: January 1939
- Political alignment: All-Union Communist Party (Bolsheviks)
- Language: Yiddish
- Headquarters: Moscow
- Country: Soviet Union

Der Emes (Yiddish: דער עמעס, IPA: [dɛr ˈɛməs], meaning 'The Truth'; from Hebrew אמת, emeth) was a Soviet newspaper in Yiddish. A continuation of the short-lived Di varhayt, Der Emes began publishing in Moscow on August 8, 1918. The publisher was the Central Committee of the Russian Communist Party (Bolsheviks). Moishe Litvakov was its editor-in-chief from 1921 until his arrest in the fall of 1937; after that, the newspaper was headed by an anonymous "editorial board". From January 7, 1921, to March 1930 Der Emes appeared as the organ of the Central Bureau of Yevsektsiya. It declined in 1937.

== Featured highlights ==
Der Emes was a conductor of Soviet propaganda and ideas directed at Jews in the USSR and all around the world.

The most prominent line of the newspaper was the struggle against antisemitic occurrences in the USSR and the Russian Diaspora. Since 1933 there was a continuous blaming of racism in Germany under Hitler.

Another topic was the promotion of Soviet Jewish proletarian culture in Yiddish that ranged from the Jewish Settlement to Yiddish theatres.

== See also ==
- History of the Jews in Russia and Soviet Union
- Yevsektsiya
- Jewish Bolshevism
- Esther Frumkin
