= Yevsektsiya =

Jewish Section of the Communist Party of the Soviet Union

A Yevsektsiya (Note: Also romanized Evsektsiya.) (Russian: евсекция, a syllabic abbreviation for "Jewish Section" (Russian: Еврейская секция). [jɪfˈsʲektsɨjə]; Yiddish: יעווסעקציע) was the ethnically Jewish section of the Communist Party of the Soviet Union and its main institutions; it is also sometimes described as the Yiddish-language branch of the CPSU. The section was established in fall of 1918 with consent of Vladimir Lenin to carry Party ideology and Marxist-Leninist atheism to the Soviet Jewish masses. The Yevsektsiya published a Yiddish periodical, Der Emes. According to Walter Kolarz, the Yevsektsiya inside the League of Militant Godless, "had a total of 40,000 Jewish members in 1929, the year when the anti-religious campaign was at its peak. These 'Jewish sections' were much despised by the bulk of Russia's Jewry. Their members were regarded with as much contempt as the Jewish renegades who turned persecutors of the own brethren in the Middle Ages."

== Mission ==
The Yevsektsiya sought to draw Jewish workers into the revolutionary organisations; chairman Semyon Dimanstein, at the first conference in October 1918, pointed out that, "when the October revolution came, the Jewish workers had remained totally passive ... and a large part of them were even against the revolution. The revolution did not reach the Jewish street. Everything remained as before".

== History ==
The Yevsektsiya remained fairly isolated from both the Jewish intelligentsia and working class. The sections were staffed mostly by Jewish ex-members of the Bund, which eventually joined the Soviet Communist Party as the Kombund in 1921, and the United Jewish Socialist Workers Party.

Former elements of the Bund and Faraynigte were historically hostile to Zionism. As they later joined Yevsektsiya, they deemed Russian Zionist organisations to be counter-revolutionary, and critiqued them. Delegates to a Zionist congress in March 1919 complained about administrative harassment of their activities - not from government agencies, but from Jewish communists. At the Yevsektsiya's second conference in July 1919, it demanded that the Zionist organizations be dissolved. After an appeal from the Zionists, the All-Russian Central Executive Committee issued a decree in that the Zionist organisation was not counter-revolutionary and its activities should not be disrupted. The campaign continued, however. In 1920, the first All-Russian Zionist Congress was disrupted by members of the Cheka and a female representative of the Yevsektsiya. At its third conference in July 1921, the Yevsektsiya demanded the "total liquidation" of Zionism.

According to Richard Pipes, "in time, every Jewish cultural and social organization came under assault". The section in Rostov-on-Don persecuted local Jewish leaders, Zionist and religious, especially the sixth Chabad Rebbe Yosef Yitzchak Schneersohn.

The Yevsektsiya attempted to use its influence to cut off state funds to Habima Theatre, branding it counter-revolutionary. The theatre left Russia to go on tour in 1926, before settling in Mandatory Palestine in 1928 to become Israel's national theatre.

== Dissolution ==
The Yevsektsia were disbanded as no longer needed in 1929. Many leading members were murdered during the Great Purge of the late 1930s, including Chairman Dimanstein. Executed in 1938, he was posthumously rehabilitated in 1955, two years after the death of Joseph Stalin.

== See also ==
- History of the Jews in Russia
- Communist Party of the Soviet Union
- Bolsheviks
- Birobidzhan
- Komzet
- Jewish Communist Party (Poalei Zion)
- Bundism
- Central Bureau of the Lithuanian Sections of the Russian Communist Party (Bolsheviks)
