= Noah Feldman =

American legal scholar (born 1970)

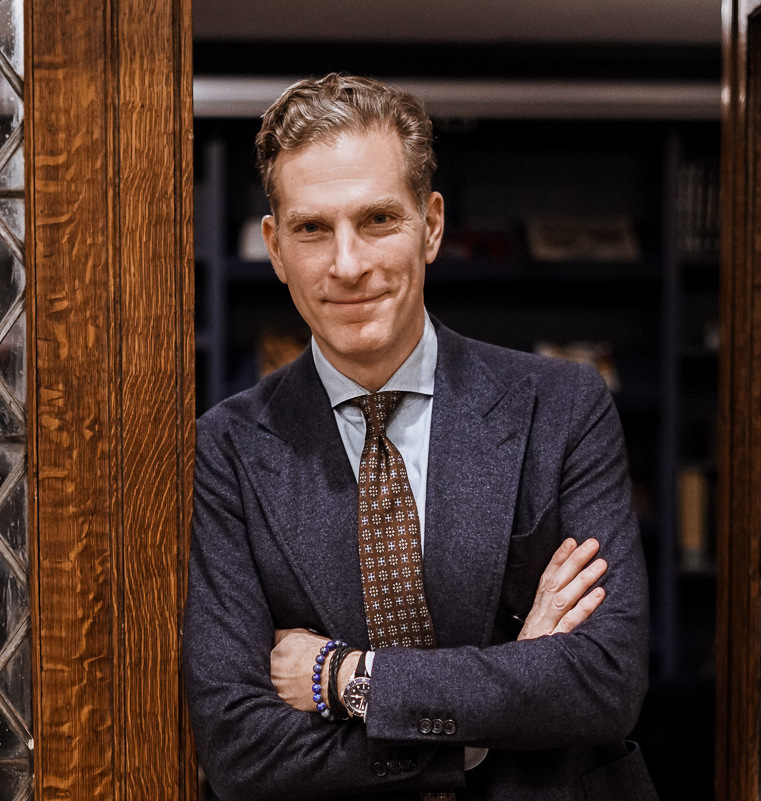
- Feldman in 2022
- Born: Noah Raam Feldman; May 22, 1970 (age 56); Boston, Massachusetts, U.S.

Academic background
- Education: Harvard University (BA); Christ Church, Oxford (DPhil); Yale University (JD)
- Thesis: Reading the Nicomachean ethics with Ibn Rushd (1994)
- Influences: Edwards; Souter

Academic work
- Discipline: Constitutional law Legal studies
- Institutions: Harvard University; Council on Foreign Relations
- Doctoral students: Rabea Eghbariah
- Main interests: Constitutional law, ethics, free speech, law and religion, AI innovation
- Website: www.noahfeldman.com

Noah Raam Feldman (born May 22, 1970) is an American legal scholar and academic who is the Arthur Kingsley Porter University Professor at Harvard University. He is also the chairman of the Harvard Society of Fellows.

Feldman was formerly a contributing writer for The New York Times, and has been a public affairs columnist for Bloomberg Opinion for over a decade, covering the Supreme Court and other legal and business matters. Feldman's work is focused on AI innovation, ethics and constitutional law with an emphasis on innovation, free speech, law and religion, and history.

== Early life and education ==
Feldman was raised in Cambridge, Massachusetts, to Orthodox Jewish parents. He studied Near Eastern languages and civilizations at Harvard University. In 1990, as a junior at Harvard College, he won a Harry S. Truman Scholarship. Feldman graduated first in his class in 1992 with a Bachelor of Arts, summa cum laude, and was elected to Phi Beta Kappa.

Upon graduating from Harvard, Feldman was awarded a Rhodes Scholarship to study at Christ Church, Oxford. In 1994, he earned a Doctor of Philosophy (D.Phil.) from Oxford in Oriental studies, writing his dissertation on Aristotelian ethics and its Islamic reception. While at Oxford, he was a member of the Oxford University L'Chaim Society. Feldman then returned to the United States to attend Yale Law School, where he was the book review editor of the Yale Law Journal. He graduated with a Juris Doctor in 1997.

== Career ==
=== Legal career ===
After graduating from law school, Feldman was a law clerk for Chief Judge Harry T. Edwards of the U.S. Court of Appeals for the District of Columbia Circuit from 1997 to 1998, then for Justice David Souter of the U.S. Supreme Court from 1998 to 1999.

In 2001, Feldman joined the faculty of New York University Law School, where he became a tenured full professor in 2005 and was appointed Cecelia Goetz Professor of Law in 2006. In 2007, he joined the Harvard Law School faculty as the Bemis Professor of International Law, teaching classes on the First Amendment, the Constitution, and the international order. In 2014, he was appointed the Felix Frankfurter Professor of Law at Harvard Law School.

In April 2024, Feldman was appointed co-chair (with Professor Alison Simmons) of Harvard's Institutional Voice Working Group by Interim President Alan Garber. The group's report, released May 28, 2024, recommended that Harvard refrain from making official statements on public matters that don't directly affect the university's core function. The recommendations were accepted by Harvard leadership and endorsed by the Harvard Corporation.

=== University Professor Appointment ===
In October 2025, Feldman was appointed the Arthur Kingsley Porter University Professor at Harvard University, the highest distinction a faculty member can receive at the university. The title of University Professor was created in 1935 to honor individuals whose groundbreaking work crosses the boundaries of multiple disciplines, allowing them to pursue research at any of Harvard's Schools.

The Arthur Kingsley Porter University Professorship specifically honors a scholar in the humanities. Feldman was honored alongside Catherine Dulac (Xander University Professor), Claudia Goldin (Samuel W. Morris University Professor), and Cumrun Vafa (Timken University Professor) in the announcement by President Alan M. Garber. Upon receiving the appointment, Feldman stated: "I'm deeply moved by this honor. I'm working on a book about the importance of being human in an age of artificial intelligence, so it is especially meaningful to hold a chair associated with humanistic study."

=== Writer and author ===
Feldman has published ten nonfiction books and two case books including The Broken Constitution, Divided By God, What We Owe Iraq, Cool War, Scorpions, The Three Lives of James Madison and The Arab Winter. Reviewing The Arab Winter in The New York Times, Robert F. Worth called Feldman's thesis "bold" and that Feldman "spins out its ramifications in fascinating and persuasive ways." Reviewing The Broken Constitution, James Oakes concludes that Feldman ignores "the voluminous historical evidence that would have added some much-needed nuance to his thoroughly unpersuasive analysis." He was a contributing writer for The New York Times Magazine from 2005 to 2011. Since 2012, he has been a regular columnist for Bloomberg Opinion. He contributes essays to The New York Review of Books about constitutional topics and the Supreme Court.

=== Podcast host ===
Since 2019, Feldman has been the host of the podcast Deep Background, which is produced by Pushkin Industries. Deep Background focuses on the historical, scientific, legal, and cultural context underlying the news, with a focus on power and ethics. He has interviewed Malcolm Gladwell, Laurie R. Santos, and Marc Lipsitch, among others.

=== Organizations and affiliations ===
In 2003, he was named senior constitutional advisor to the Coalition Provisional Authority in Iraq. In that capacity he advised on the drafting of the Transitional Administrative Law, the precursor to the Iraqi constitution.

In 2010, he became a senior fellow at the Harvard Society of Fellows, and in 2020, he was named chair. A Harvard Magazine profile describes the Society as such: "The values it represents to [Feldman] have shaped his career: 'convivial intellectual community with people from many very different backgrounds; interdisciplinary creativity and collaboration; openness to new, unorthodox ideas; pursuing solutions to long-term questions that really matter for the world; generosity to colleagues and across generations; nurturing originality to encourage risk-taking; and belief in sustained, in-person conversation as a central element of the good intellectual life.'"

He is founding director of the Julis-Rabinowitz Program on Jewish & Israeli Law at Harvard Law School.

In 2024, Feldman delivered several named lectures including the Yale L. Rosenberg Memorial Lecture at University of Houston Law Center (April 3, 2024) and the Brainerd Currie Memorial Lecture at Duke Law School.

=== Facebook Oversight Board ===
Feldman advised Facebook on the creation of its Oversight Board, whose members were announced in June 2020. Feldman proposed the idea of the oversight board to his friend Sheryl Sandberg in 2018 and shortly thereafter gave a presentation to Facebook's corporate board about the idea, at Mark Zuckerberg's invitation. According to Feldman, the purpose of the Oversight Board is to protect and ensure freedom of expression on the platform by creating an independent body to review Facebook's most important content moderation decisions.

A 2020 profile in Harvard Magazine describes the genesis of the board:

"On a bike ride one day, [Feldman] thought: Facebook and other social media are under a lot of pressure to avoid outcomes that are morally repugnant. What if they addressed the problem as governments do, giving independent bodies functioning like courts the authority to decide what content is acceptable and what is not? Social media themselves, he decided, should find ways to protect free expression—and he made a proposal to Facebook, the world’s largest social-media platform, with more than 2.6 billion users who send out an average of 115 billion messages a day: 'To put it simply: we need a Supreme Court of Facebook.'"

=== AI and technology governance ===
In 2021, Feldman co-founded Ethical Compass Advisors with Seth Berman, a consultancy firm helping technology companies improve ethical decision-making through innovative governance solutions. The firm's clients include Meta, eBay, TikTok, and other major AI startups.

From 2021 to 2023, Feldman served as an outside consultant in designing Anthropic's Long-Term Benefit Trust governance structure, which was announced on September 19, 2023. The trust ensures the AI laboratory balances profit with public benefit through five financially disinterested trustees.

Feldman has written extensively on AI regulation, including proposing creation of a new federal agency to regulate artificial intelligence.

=== Trump testimony ===
On December 4, 2019, Feldman, alongside law professors Pamela Karlan, Michael Gerhardt, and Jonathan Turley, testified before the House Judiciary Committee regarding the constitutional grounds for presidential impeachment in the impeachment inquiry against President Donald Trump.

"Some day, we will no longer be alive, and we will go wherever it is we go, the good place or the other place, and we may meet there Madison and Hamilton", Feldman suggested. "And they will ask us, 'When the president of the United States acted to corrupt the structure of the republic, what did you do?' And our answer to that question must be that we followed the guidance of the framers, and it must be that if the evidence supports that conclusion, that the House of Representatives moves to impeach him."

== Public perception ==
=== Media ===
In 2024, Feldman criticized characterizations of the Gaza genocide as a "genocide," and wrote a defense of the Israel's actions in the Gaza war for Time.

In 2020, Harvard Magazine wrote:

Feldman is increasingly prominent as a public intellectual and a voice about public affairs ... His work displays the mix of synthesis and substantive mastery that serious journalists aspire to, and the combination of clarity and eloquence that few scholars display. He writes with the conviction that the most important public position in American life is that of citizen, which makes his fellow citizens the most important audience for his writing about American public affairs.

In 2019, The New York Times wrote that Feldman was "part of a vanishing breed, a public intellectual equally at ease with writing law review articles, books aimed at both popular and scholarly audiences and regular opinion columns, all leaning left but with a distinct contrarian streak." According to The New York Times, Feldman "specializes in constitutional law and the relationship between law and religion and free speech".

In 2008, Feldman was named in Esquire's list of the "75 most influential people of the 21st century." The magazine called him "one of the country's most sought after authorities," "an acclaimed author" and "a public intellectual of our time."

In 2006, New York Magazine named Feldman "the next big public intellectual", and later, as "most beautiful brainiac" in The Most Beautiful People issue.

In 2005, The New York Observer called Feldman "one of a handful of earnest, platinum-résumé'd law geeks whose prospects for the Big Bench are the source of constant speculation among friends and colleagues".

=== Criticism of Modern Orthodox Judaism ===
In a New York Times Magazine article, "Orthodox Paradox", Feldman recounted his experiences of the boundaries of inclusion and exclusion of the Modern Orthodox Jewish community in which he was raised, specifically at his high school alma mater, the Maimonides School. He contended that his choice to marry a non-Jew led to ostracism by the school, in which he and his then-girlfriend were allegedly removed from the 1998 photograph of his class reunion published in the school newsletter. His marriage to a non-Jew is contrary to orthodox Jewish law, although he and his family had been active members of the Harvard Hillel Orthodox minyan. The photographer's account of an overcrowded photograph was used to accuse Feldman of misrepresenting a fundamental fact in the story, namely whether he was purposely cropped out of the picture, as many other class members were also cropped from the newsletter photograph due to space limitations.

His critique of Modern Orthodox Judaism has been commented on by many, including Hillel Halkin, columnist for the New York Sun; Andrew Silow-Carroll, editor of the New Jersey Jewish News; Rabbi Tzvi Hersh Weinreb, executive vice president of the Orthodox Union; Marc B. Shapiro Rabbi Shalom Carmy, tenured professor of Jewish philosophy at Yeshiva University; Rabbi Norman Lamm, chancellor of Yeshiva University; Rabbi Shmuley Boteach; Gary Rosenblatt, editor of Jewish Week, the editorial board of the Jewish Press; Rabbis Ozer Glickman and Aharon Kahn, roshei yeshiva at Yeshiva University; Ami Eden, executive editor of The Forward; Rabbi David M. Feldman, author of Where There's Life, There's Life; and Jonathan Rosenblum, columnist for the Jerusalem Post.

== Personal life ==
Feldman was previously married to Jeannie Suk, a professor of law at Harvard Law School and New Yorker contributor, with whom he has two children. In 2023, he became engaged to Julia Allison, and they married on June 15, 2025.

Feldman has been called a "hyperpolyglot" and is fluent in English, Hebrew, Arabic, and French. He also speaks conversational Korean, and reads Greek, Latin, German, Italian, Spanish and Aramaic.

== Publications ==
=== Books ===
Feldman has published ten nonfiction books and two casebooks:

- ——— (2024). To Be a Jew Today: A New Guide to God, Israel, and the Jewish People. New York, NY: Farrar, Straus and Giroux. ISBN 978-0374298340. (Note: To Be a Jew Today (2024) became a New York Times bestseller and examines how contemporary Jews understand their relationship to God, Israel, and each other, with particular focus on the post-October 7, 2023 context.)
- The Broken Constitution: Lincoln, Slavery, and the Refounding of America (2021) "seeks to retell the story of the meaning of the Constitution in the Civil War and of Lincoln’s decisive action not as the story of successful salvation but as something more dramatic, and more extreme: the frank breaking and frank remaking of the entire union of order, rights, constitution, and liberty." The book is a history of "an extraordinary transformation" in Lincoln's "beliefs about the meaning of the Constitution".
- The Arab Winter: A Tragedy (2020) seeks to "save the Arab spring from the verdict of implicit nonexistence and to propose an alternative account that highlights the exercise of collective, free political action." The book "is an interdisciplinary work of history and sociology, as well as linguistics, using insights of political philosophy to explore the right ways of governing in the very different countries of Egypt, Syria, and Tunisia, as well as the Islamic State."
- The Three Lives of James Madison: Genius, Partisan, President (2017) "explores Madison's reactive and improvisational thinking as it played out in the three uniquely consequential roles, or ‘lives,' he had — as constitutional architect and co-author with Alexander Hamilton and John Jay of the ‘Federalist Papers,' political partisan and wartime president." Feldman writes that Madison's "character emerges most vividly through the cycles of [his] extraordinarily close friendships" and that his biography is "entwined with that of the constitutional republic itself, its personalities, and its permanent struggle to reconcile unity with profound disagreement."
- Cool War: The Future of Global Competition (2013) is about the relationship between the United States and China, as "the world's two biggest economies are fated to remain geopolitical frenemies, locked in a chilly embrace necessitated by economic interdependence but made tense by constant military and political rivalry in Asia and, increasingly, the rest of the world." As each side vies for supremacy, Feldman warns, the Cool War has the potential to become a hot war.
- Scorpions: The Battles and Triumphs of FDR's Great Supreme Court Justices (2010) focuses on four of Roosevelt's Supreme Court appointees: Felix Frankfurter, Hugo Black, Robert Jackson, and William O. Douglas, and "how the backgrounds, personalities, and experiences of the four justices shaped their philosophies and how those philosophies changed the Court from a conservative one resisting America's liberal turn under FDR into the liberal one that helped remake the nation". This group biography demonstrates that their competing judicial philosophies "are the ones that continue to preoccupy lawyers, law professors and judges".
- The Fall and Rise of the Islamic State (2008) explains the increasingly loud call for implementing shari'a in Muslim countries. Feldman argues that current systems of government in certain Muslim countries have unchecked executive power because the previous system – in which scholarly interpretation of shari'a served to counterbalance executive power – was undermined by failed reforms in the modern era. Drawing on the success of this previous system, Feldman proposes a viable path for Islamic governance that depends on legislators to serve as the check on authoritarian executives.
- Divided By God: America's Church-State Problem and What We Should Do About It (2005) describes "key episodes in the history of church-state relations to show how the growing religious diversity of the American people has led to new efforts to find common ground for political and social life." Addressing the divide between the competing camps of "values evangelicals" and "legal secularists," Feldman proposes a compromise "to allow religious symbols in public places but not to allow public funding for specifically religious practices or activities".
- What We Owe Iraq: War and the Ethics of Nation Building (2004) argues that "having broken the Iraqi government, Washington has an obligation to bring about a new and better one" while ensuring that nation building does not become "a paternalistic, colonialist charade." As a constitutional advisor to the Coalition Provisional Authority in Iraq, Feldman suggests the United States ensure security and organize elections before withdrawing.
- After Jihad: America and the Struggle for Islamic Democracy (2003) contends that support of violent jihad in the Muslim world is declining in favor of popularity for both Islam and democracy. Explaining shared traits of Islam and democracy, such as equality and flexibility, Feldman argues that the two are in fact compatible and that "democracy in the Arab world should be Islamic in character."
- ——— (2003). After Jihad: America and the Struggle for Islamic Democracy. New York: Farrar, Straus and Giroux. ISBN 9780374177690. LCCN 2002192524. OCLC 1024173388.
- ——— (2004). What We Owe Iraq: War and the Ethics of Nation Building. Princeton, NJ: Princeton University Press. ISBN 9780691121796. LCCN 2004016041. OCLC 355628322.
- ——— (2005). Divided by God: America's Church-State Problem – and What We Should Do About It. New York: Farrar, Straus and Giroux. ISBN 9780374281311. LCCN 2005007064. OCLC 1033658906.
- ——— (2008). The Fall and Rise of the Islamic State. Princeton, NJ: Princeton University Press. ISBN 9780691120454. LCCN 2007047918. OCLC 437427441.
- ——— (2010). Scorpions: The Battles and Triumphs of FDR's Great Supreme Court Justices. New York: Twelve Books. ISBN 9780446580571. LCCN 2010007788. OCLC 528665984.
- ——— (2013). Cool War: The Future of Global Competition. New York: Random House. ISBN 9780812992748. LCCN 2013007907. OCLC 846844628.
- ——— (2017) The Three Lives of James Madison: Genius, Partisan, President. Description & arrow/scrollable preview. Random House, New York. ISBN 9780812992755. LCCN 2017-125 OCLC 1008877503.
- ——— (2020). The Arab Winter: A Tragedy. Princeton, NJ: Princeton University Press. ISBN 978-0691194929. LCCN 2019030393. OCLC 9421051640.
- ——— (2021). The Broken Constitution: Lincoln, Slavery, and the Refounding of America. New York, NY: Farrar, Straus and Giroux. ISBN 9780374116644.
- ——— (2024). To Be a Jew Today: A New Guide to God, Israel, and the Jewish People. New York, NY: Farrar, Straus and Giroux. ISBN 978-0374298340.
- Feldman, Noah R.; Sullivan, Kathleen M. (2022). Constitutional Law (21st ed.). St. Paul, MN: Foundation Press. ISBN 9781636598444. – various editions/supplements prior to this version
- Feldman, Noah R.; Sullivan, Kathleen M. (2019). First Amendment Law (Seventh ed.). St. Paul, MN: Foundation Press. ISBN 978-1684673308. LCCN 2019296312. OCLC 1111925275.

=== Selected articles ===
- Feldman, Noah R. (November 2015). "Chapter 39: Mormonism in the American Political Domain". In Givens, Terryl L.; Barlow, Philip L. (eds.). The Oxford Handbook of Mormonism. Vol. Part VIII Mormonism in the World Community. New York: Oxford University Press. doi:10.1093/oxfordhb/9780199778362.013.36. ISBN 9780199778362. OCLC 5932525069.
- Weisberg, Jacob; Feldman, Noah (September 28, 2017). "What Are Impeachable Offenses?". The New York Review of Books.
- Feldman, Noah (October 28, 2017). "Opinion: James Madison's Lessons in Racism". The New York Times.
- Feldman, Noah (2018). "On "It can't happen here"". In Sunstein, Cass R. (ed.). Can It Happen Here?: Authoritarianism in America. New York: Dey St., an imprint of William Morrow. ISBN 9780062696199. OCLC 1027963797.
- Feldman, Noah (May 24, 2018). "Crooked Trump?". The New York Review of Books.
- Feldman, Noah (June 5, 2018). "Opinion: Are You Sure You Want a Right to Trump's Twitter Account?". The New York Times.
- Feldman, Noah (July 19, 2018). "Tipping the Scales". The New York Review of Books.
- Feldman, Noah (December 6, 2018). "Justifying Diversity". The New York Review of Books.
- Feldman, Noah (September 26, 2020). "Amy Coney Barrett Deserves to Be on the Supreme Court". Bloomberg.
- Feldman, Noah (June 24, 2022). "Ending Roe Is Institutional Suicide for Supreme Court". Bloomberg.
- Feldman, Noah R. (2024). "Religion in Public Schools: Constitutional Revolution in Action". University of Cincinnati Law Review. 93 (2): 299–340.
- Feldman, Noah (May 15, 2025). "The Last Bulwark". The New York Review of Books.

== See also ==
- List of law clerks for the third seat of the Supreme Court of the United States
