= Libs of TikTok =

Far-right and anti-LGBTQ Twitter account

@libsoftiktok
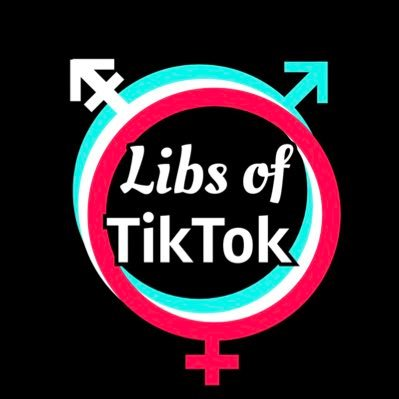
- Libs of TikTok's Twitter avatar
- Formation: April 2021
- Founder: Chaya Raichik
- Founded at: United States
- Publication: Twitter; TikTok (suspended); Bluesky (suspended); Instagram (suspended)
- Affiliations: Far-right politics, (Note: Attributed to multiple sources:) anti-LGBTQ rhetoric (Note: Attributed to multiple sources:)

Libs of TikTok is the username of various American anti-LGBTQ and far-right social-media accounts operated by Chaya Raichik (/ˈxɑːjə ˈraɪtʃɪk/ KHAH-yə RY-chik), a former real estate agent. Raichik uses the accounts to repost content from left-wing and LGBTQ people on TikTok or other social-media platforms, often with mocking or derogatory commentary. With millions of followers on Twitter, Raichik is influential among American conservatives and the political right.

The accounts promote transphobia and other anti-LGBTQ rhetoric, such as claims that transgender people are mentally ill and pretend to be of the gender they identify themselves as. Libs of TikTok also spreads false claims, especially relating to the medical care of transgender children. Raichik's posts regularly label LGBTQ people and mental-health providers "groomers". (Note: Attributed to multiple sources:) Her accounts have received several temporary suspensions and a permanent suspension from TikTok.

Raichik's posts have resulted in threats, harassment, and doxing perpetuated by her followers against teachers, medical providers, children's hospitals, libraries, LGBTQ venues, and educational facilities. At least 60 bomb threats have been linked to Libs of TikTok posts.

== History ==
=== Inception and original content (November 2020 – June 2021) ===
In November 2020, Raichik created a Twitter account with the handle @shaya69830552, later changed to @shaya_ray. According to The Daily Dot, the account began as "reply account that routinely showed up in the comments of prominent conservatives on Twitter." Under these handles, Raichik downplayed the severity of COVID-19, promoted the disproven conspiracy theory that the 2020 United States presidential election was stolen from Donald Trump through election fraud, and made posts showing that she was present at the January 6 Capitol attack. Raichik criticized Capitol Police. She tweeted that she did not enter the Capitol building like "a few crazy people" had, and called the breach "mostly peaceful", and she later favorably compared the attack to a Black Lives Matter protest. In early 2021, the account had less than 1,000 followers.

She later changed the handle to @cuomomustgo, focusing on demanding the resignation of then-governor of New York Andrew Cuomo following the sexual harassment allegations levied against him. Raichik also used the account to advocate for the recall of California governor Gavin Newsom. By March 2021, the handle had changed to @houseplantpotus, a parody account tweeting as a houseplant in the White House during the presidency of Joe Biden. On April 19, 2021, Raichik adopted the moniker @libsoftiktok, promising to "help you find your daily dose of cringe". In May and June 2021, before and during Pride Month, Libs of TikTok started posting anti-LGBTQ commentary, including her first tweet promoting the LGBTQ grooming conspiracy theory. The account's early reposts also included reposts of videos by progressives about Anthony Fauci and vaccinations that it deemed cringeworthy. Slate linked Libs of TikTok's early success to "shamelessly tagging alt-right and far-right heavy hitters on Twitter, a strategy she continues to use to this day".

=== Media attention (August 2021 – April 2022) ===
By August 2021, Libs of TikTok had amassed around 65,000 followers. In August 2021, podcaster Joe Rogan began promoting @LibsofTikTok on The Joe Rogan Experience, leading to a larger increase in followers. That same month, lawyer and Republican Party operative Grant Lally filed a trademark for Libs of TikTok as a "news reporter service". The account has been promoted by Donald Trump Jr., journalist Glenn Greenwald and political commentators Tucker Carlson, Jesse Watters and Laura Ingraham; has been featured in the New York Post, The Federalist, The Post Millennial, Fox News and in other right-wing news outlets; and its posts have been retweeted by Meghan McCain.

Prior to being revealed as the account creator, Raichik was interviewed anonymously on several occasions, during which she boasted that posts from the account led to the firings of several teachers. Raichik encouraged followers to join local school boards in order to remove teachers who teach about gender and sexuality. Raichik told the New York Post that "I don't do this for money or fame" and "I'm not some politician or blue-check journalist."

=== Identity revelation (April 2022) ===
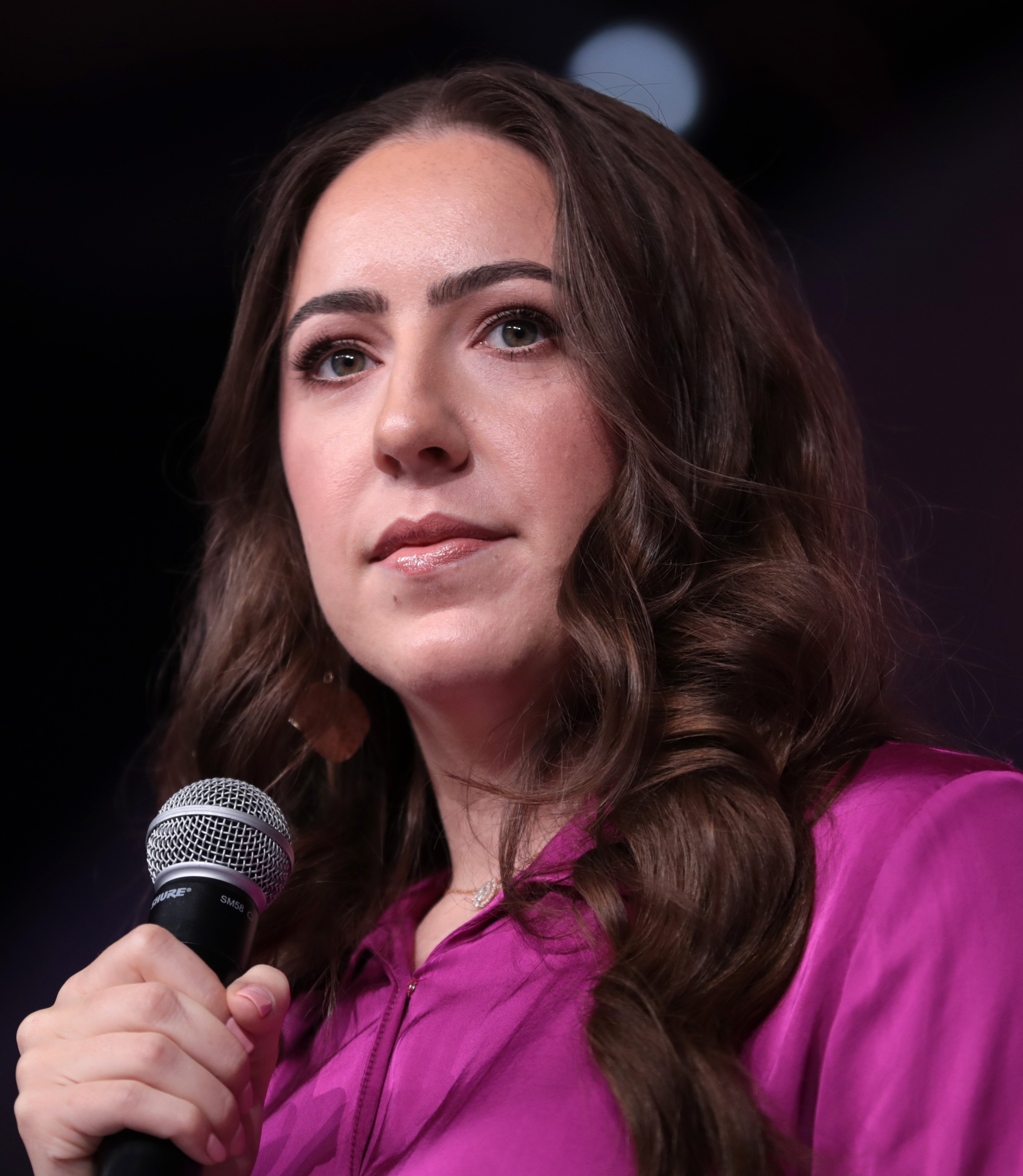
Chaya Raichik in 2023

In April 2022, details surfaced regarding the account's operator. Raichik registered the domain libsoftiktok.us in October 2021. The .us top-level domain does not allow anonymous registration, so her full name and other information was listed publicly on the WHOIS record for the domain. A software developer recognized this and named Raichik as the account's creator in early April 2022.

On April 19, 2022, The Washington Post published an article by journalist Taylor Lorenz which further reported on Raichik's identity, noting that she worked in real estate in Brooklyn and that she was "proudly" Orthodox Jewish, details scraped from early iterations of the Libs of TikTok Twitter account. The web version of the article initially linked to Raichik's real estate license, though it was later removed.

Conservatives criticized Lorenz for her methods in reporting, for revealing Raichik's identity at all, for alleged antisemitism, and for hypocrisy (having previously spoken out against online harassment). Some accused her of doxxing Raichik, though Lorenz countered that the information was already publicly available. The Washington Post stood by the reporting. Senior managing editor Cameron Barr stated that the Post "did not publish or link to any details about [Raichik's] personal life", though Raichik noted that a home address was listed on the real-estate license the article originally linked to. Lorenz said critics were trying to "sow doubt and discredit journalism".

Raichik personally accused Lorenz of doxxing and of violating her right to free speech, though she vowed to "never be silenced". The next month, she tweeted that she had "received about a dozen death threats", including threats to throw a pipe bomb into her house. Lorenz also reported that she faced personal backlash, noting that, in response to the article, her "whole family" had been doxxed, and that "trolls [then] moved on to doxxing and stalking any random friends I've tagged on Instagram".

The Libs of TikTok account gained 200,000 followers the day after The Washington Post's story was published.

Lorenz arranged an interview two years after The Washington Post article, during which Raichik argued against gender-affirming care and discussed whether Raichik considered herself a public figure after being outed.

== Content ==
Libs of TikTok has been described as right-wing, conservative, far-right, extreme right-wing, and extremist. The Times of London described the account as a "Twitter provocateur". The account is generally devoted to reposting content from left-leaning social-media accounts that sparks outrage among its right-wing followers. The reposted videos are most often LGBTQ-related.

=== Drag-show-related content ===
Raichik contends that adults teaching children about LGBTQ identities is abusive and constitutes child grooming. She often uses Libs of TikTok to publicize LGBTQ events either involving or aimed at youth, and, on more than one occasion, some of these events have been targeted by right-wing extremists. Raichik has claimed that being gender non-conforming or being an ally of the LGBTQ community is a "mental illness", and deliberately misgendered transgender people.

In June 2022, Libs of TikTok had some of their tweets removed after they posted the locations of drag-focused events in the United States, including at least one Drag Queen Story Hour that was geared toward preschool-aged children. That location, in San Lorenzo, California, was stormed by the Proud Boys, a far-right extremist group. Pride events in Dallas and Coeur d'Alene were also targeted by right-wing extremists after Libs of TikTok posted about them; at the Coeur d'Alene event, 31 Patriot Front members were arrested before getting to their destination. In June, a spokesperson for the Alameda County Sheriff's Office said investigators believe that the Proud Boys confrontation was caused by Libs of TikTok. In August, NPR reported that "no conclusive link between the posts and the extremist groups' activities" had been established.

The Proud Boys have also targeted or threatened to target other events Libs of TikTok has publicized, including a Woodland, California, bar's drag happy hour (which Raichik said was hosted by a "youth group" for "all ages"), a drag brunch planned to benefit a local LGBTQ resource center in Sanford, North Carolina, and a drag-queen story hour that was planned (and then cancelled) by a K-5 school in Columbus, Ohio.

In November, a South Dakota State University LGBTQ student group was the target of a bomb threat being investigated by the University Police Department, after Libs of TikTok posted alleged footage of that year's annual drag event, which was advertised as all-ages. The student group and the performer at the center of the event said Libs of TikTok's video spliced together scenes of that year's event with the previous year's event, which had been age-restricted.

In May 2023, it was reported that the shooter responsible for the Allen, Texas shooting had dedicated to Libs of TikTok a long screed he posted to social media denouncing Drag Queen Story Hour.

=== Gender-affirming-care-related content ===
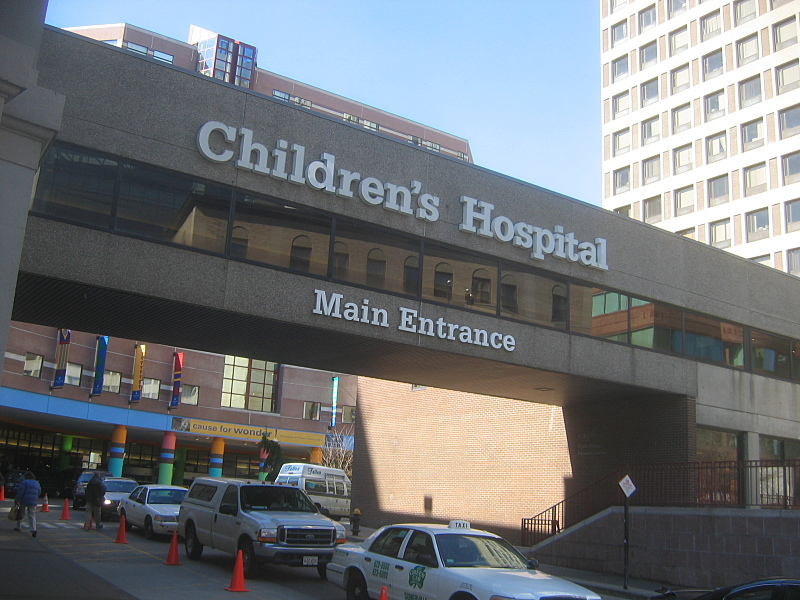
Main entrance of Boston Children's Hospital, which was targeted by Libs of TikTok with false claims about the hospital's gender-affirming care

Raichik opposes gender-affirming surgery on children, arguing that it is mass scale child abuse and that "[a]ny doctor performing these surgeries should have their license revoked. They belong in prison".

In August 2022, on Libs of TikTok social-media accounts, Raichik claimed that Boston Children's Hospital (BCH) and Children's National Hospital (CNH) were providing gender-affirming bottom surgeries to minors. With the BCH-related content, Raichik included a BCH video that featured one of the hospital's gynecologists explaining the procedure. USA Today, NPR, and PolitiFact concluded that BCH claim was false. The CNH content was an audio recording with two operators who stated that 16-year-old trans boys would be eligible for hysterectomies at the hospital. CNH denied the operators' statements and noted that "[n]one of the people who were secretly recorded by this activist group deliver care to our patients". Several conservative outlets—including The Daily Caller and The Post Millennial—republished one or both stories.

Both hospitals' websites featured mistaken information as to the eligibility for gender-affirming bottom surgeries: A public-facing file on BCH's website said that vaginoplasty patients must be "between 17 and 35 years of age at the time of surgery"; when asked about this document, the hospital explained that it had since been updated to reflect the protocol it said it had "always adhered to"—that, while consultations were available to 17 year olds, only those over 18 were eligible for the surgery. CNH's website had stated that hysterectomies were provided to patients "between the ages of 0–21". But a spokeswoman for the hospital stated: "We do not and have never performed gender-affirming hysterectomies for anyone under the age of 18."

After the Libs of TikTok posts, each hospital's employees were subject to harassment, and both BCH and CNH were subject to bomb threats, (Note: BCH bomb threats: CNH bomb threats:) though it was unclear whether the BCH threat was related to the harassment. NBC News described Libs of TikTok as "one of the primary drivers of the harassment campaign" against BCH. The threats of violence were widely denounced, and both state and federal authorities launched investigations into the threats. When contacted by The Washington Post, Raichik did not answer a question about whether she felt responsible for the threats against the hospitals, but said that "we 100% condemn any acts/threats of violence". In a later tweet, Raichik said that she would continue to call out hospitals, and, in the aftermath of the CNH tweets, after which Twitter temporarily suspended the Libs of TikTok account, Raichik said, "Getting suspended by Twitter has only made me realize my biggest mistake. I only called one hospital I should have called dozens because I promise you Children's National is not the only one. I promise to learn from my mistake and uncover more of what our Big Tech overlords don't want us to know. I will do better in the future."

Raichik subsequently posted stories about Akron Children's Hospital and Barbara Bush Children's Hospital providing non-surgical gender-affirming care, including puberty blockers, to minors. Raichik also posted about an adolescent clinic at Johns Hopkins All Children's Hospital, highlighting its practice of asking parents to step out of the room for a few minutes to give young patients a "safe space". In response to the social-media attention, which included threats, Akron Children's Hospital temporarily took down the gender-affirming care section of their website and information about its employees and the care they provide.

The account has targeted other hospitals that provide gender-affirming care, in some cases with false claims, including a children's hospital in Omaha, Nebraska, UPMC Children's Hospital of Pittsburgh, and Phoenix Children's Hospital, leading to phoned-in threats and harassment. After Libs of TikTok's targeting of specific hospitals, other pediatric facilities including Chicago's Lurie Children's Hospital have faced harassment and false claims about care they provide. In September 2022, in response to Libs of TikTok's posts, Lurie Children's Hospital increased its security and moved a transgender youth support group from in-person meetings to online meetings.

=== Teaching-related content ===
Teachers supporting LGBTQ students have been noted as one of the "most frequent" targets of the Libs of TikTok account. Several of the teachers targeted have reported harassment and death threats. (Note: Attributed to multiple sources:) According to a report by the left-leaning media watchdog group Media Matters for America, between January and April 2022, the account named or tagged around 222 educational institutions and teachers. According to Euronews, "some of the people targeted by [Libs of TikTok] have received hundreds or even thousands of hate comments."

On November 16, 2021, an assistant professor at Old Dominion University was placed on administrative leave after an interview in which the professor argued that pedophilia should be destigmatized was posted on the Libs of TikTok account and went viral. On November 24, the professor resigned from their position.

A teacher in California was placed on administrative leave after a video she posted joking about asking her students to pledge allegiance to a Pride flag was reposted by Libs of TikTok on August 27, 2021. After conservative and far-right accounts attacked her on social media, she deleted all of her social media accounts.

In April 2022, Raichik reposted a video supporting LGBTQ students by an 8th grade English teacher in Owasso, Oklahoma; in the video, the teacher stated, "If your parents don't accept you for who you are, fuck them. I'm your parents now. I'm proud of you. Drink some water. I love you". After parents complained about the video, the teacher resigned, later telling the Washington Post he had received death threats from Libs of TikTok's followers. Oklahoma Republican Senate candidate Jackson Lahmeyer accused the teacher of being a "predator". Libs of TikTok later made a post claiming, without evidence, that the teacher was fired "after complaints of grooming". Some parents defended the teacher, saying that he provided a "safe haven" for LGBTQ students.

In October 2022, a Huntsville, Alabama animal shelter faced backlash, including death threats and negative reviews on Google, after Libs of TikTok reposted a video from the shelter showing a middle school teacher reading in drag. Libs of TikTok alleged the teacher made lewd sexual innuendos and jokes to a room of children. As a result, the teacher was put on indefinite paid administrative leave by Huntsville City Schools for investigation. The teacher defended his comments, comparing them to innuendos in kids' movies. The animal shelter supported the teacher and the event, emphasizing their commitment to inclusivity and kindness. The teacher also received death threats.

==== Educational facilities and bomb threats ====
Multiple educational facilities and institutions that were featured in posts by Libs of TikTok have reported receiving bomb threats afterwards. When contacted by Vice, Raichik stated that "the threats had nothing to do with her or her followers." According to an October 2023 report by Vice, out of 42 establishments featured in Libs of TikTok posts that Vice contacted, 11 schools and school districts had reported receiving bomb threats. Although a direct connection between Libs of TikTok's posts and the threats were not made, some have found the nature of these threats to be unusual.

In August 2023, an Ellen Ochoa Elementary School (part of Union Public Schools in Tulsa, Oklahoma) librarian's video was edited and shared by Libs of TikTok and reposted by Oklahoma State Superintendent Ryan Walters. After the video was shared, both Ellen Ochoa Elementary School and the librarian's home received multiple bomb threats. Bombing threats were accompanied by letters to media threatening to bomb "every school in the union district", unless the schools stopped "pushing this woke ideology".

In August 2023, Libs of TikTok accused a California elementary school of being "racist against white people". The next day, a bomb threat was emailed to the school and it was evacuated; local police described the email as having "racial undertones". Around the same time, a library in Davis, California, became the target of bomb threats after Libs of TikTok tweeted about an event in the establishment which resulted in a group of speakers being asked to leave over speech that was hostile towards trans athletes. According to local police, the threats were laden with hate speech of some kind.

In September 2023, a school in Illinois received three bomb threats in four days after Libs of TikTok posted a picture of one of its classrooms where a Pride flag was hanging. The school evacuated students twice, on consecutive days, after the threats were received.

In November 2023, Raichik posted an image of herself smiling with a copy of USA Today featuring the front-page headline "When Libs of TikTok posts, threats increasingly follow". Will Carless, the reporter who wrote the piece, reported experiencing "harassment, bomb threats and death threats dozens of times".

In February 2024, NBC News reported 33 instances of violent threats being made against individuals or organizations that Libs of TikTok had previously posted about since November 2020, twenty of which were bomb threats. The report further commented saying, "the timing suggests that Libs of TikTok posts have been used to pick targets." In at least three instances, those bomb threats led to criminal charges against at least nine individuals.

In April 2024, at least 54 additional instances of bomb threats were reported to be linked to posts by Libs of TikTok.

=== Other content and hoaxes ===
In reference to a preschool that held a gay pride march, the account stated, "stop sending your kids to indoctrination camps". It has encouraged followers to contact schools that allowed transgender students to use bathrooms corresponding to their gender identity. Libs of TikTok also aims to "spread the horrors of what doctors are doing to young, confused individuals".

In since-deleted tweets, the account specifically accused Chasten Buttigieg and The Trevor Project organization of grooming. The account argued in another since-deleted tweet that any teacher who comes out as gay to their students should be fired.

Libs of TikTok has been criticized for spreading hoaxes, including the litter boxes in schools hoax about bathroom accommodations for students that identified as cats, and for spreading false claims such as that students in a second-grade class in Austin, Texas were being taught about furries, and that U.S. Representative Katie Porter had argued that pedophilia is not a crime after Porter lamented that LGBTQ people were being slandered as pedophiles and groomers on social media. The account has also posted, or been accused of posting, edited footage of drag events, in one case resulting in bomb threats against the audience and the performer in North Dakota, and in a separate incident resulting in death threats against a drag performer who eventually resigned from a teaching position in Alabama.

Libs of TikTok has denied the existence of systemic racism, but argued that racism against white people was "flourishing" in the United States. Reporting by Slate stated that "Raichik's feed is colored by an intense hostility to liberals generally, but she holds an especially pronounced animosity toward LGBTQ people, city dwellers, and Black people who have been killed at the hands of police", noting that the account has referred to George Floyd as a criminal, and mocked the killing of Ma'Khia Bryant.

The most popular video posted on Libs of TikTok, with 5.7 million views, was taken by a female student at Arizona State University. The video shows her and her friend repeatedly asking a white male student to leave a multicultural center due to a "Police Lives Matter" sticker on his laptop. After the video went viral, ASU investigated and then reprimanded the two female students.

=== Colorado Springs nightclub shooting ===
On November 20, 2022, Libs of TikTok received renewed media attention following the Colorado Springs nightclub shooting, a mass killing that took place at an LGBTQ venue in which five people were killed and dozens more were injured. Club Q, the venue targeted by the shooter, frequently hosts drag events, including those advertised to an all-ages audience. The Independent noted that Libs of TikTok often attracts negative attention to such events with her social media accounts and that harassment and threats are often sent by her followers against patrons and performers following her postings. Hours after the shooting, Raichik used her Twitter account to target a "drag organization" in the same state where the massacre took place, underlining the names of two Colorado state legislators, one of whom was trans, for supporting it. The Advocate criticized the post, saying that: "In the hours after news of the Club Q shooting spread, Raichik, for example, doubled down on her anti-LGBTQ+ messaging by posting about other drag-inclusive events in the state." They drew attention to an interview previously published on their website with Juliette Kayyem, a former assistant secretary at the Department of Homeland Security, in which she stated that social media accounts such as Libs of TikTok practice stochastic terrorism by provoking extremist outrage against marginalized groups, but using "vague language that allows the agitator to deny responsibility for the act".

== Account suspensions ==
=== Twitter ===
Twitter has temporarily suspended the Libs of TikTok account five times, including for promoting "violence, threats or harassment against others" based on minority status and for "hateful conduct". At least two of the suspensions stemmed from Raichik misgendering persons in tweets.

On September 25, 2022, Libs of TikTok received a one-week suspension from Twitter and claimed that Twitter did not cite a reason for the suspension. However, The Babylon Bee CEO Seth Dillon said that Libs of TikTok was suspended for "hateful conduct" with "no specific tweets [being] flagged". In response to the suspension, Libs of TikTok hired a law firm that sent a letter threatening legal action against Twitter if they decide to permanently suspend Libs of TikTok. Libs of TikTok also created a legal defense fund and encouraged her supporters to donate to the fund. Libs of TikTok said that the suspension was "the result of a targeted harassment campaign from the Left to deplatform me", adding that "The truth is I haven't engaged in hateful conduct. I've just exposed the Left's depravity by reporting the facts. There's no rule against that, so they have to make up violations I've never committed".

LGBTQ advocates on Twitter have advocated for Twitter to permanently suspend Libs of TikTok, and several commentators noted that Twitter had not imposed an outright (permanent) ban on the account. According to NPR, "Libs of TikTok appears to have evaded outright bans by coming right up to the edge of the platforms' rules but not breaking them", adding that the account "does not explicitly encourage followers to threaten anyone, and typically uses its target's own words, sometimes stripped of context, to imply wrongdoing." According to Joan Donovan, research director of the Shorenstein Center on Media, Politics and Public Policy, Raichik dodges bans by deleting problematic tweets before the platform takes action, a tactic Donovan said is common for digital actors spreading disinformation.

From roughly August to October 2022, Libs of TikTok was the subject of significant internal conversation at Twitter, with some employees arguing that the account should be permanently banned due to its potential for inciting violence. After Elon Musk acquired Twitter and became its CEO in October 2022, the site's moderation activity was reduced significantly. On December 9, journalist Bari Weiss claimed that Twitter had limited Libs of TikTok's reach via shadow banning, a claim that was rejected by Twitter's former head of product, Kayvon Beykpour, who replied with "You are characterizing any de-amplification as equating to shadow banning which is either a lazy interpretation or deliberately misleading." Conversely, Evan Urquhart of Slate argued that Weiss' own publishing revealed that Libs of TikTok was receiving preferential treatment, with moderators directed not to take any action against the account and to instead elevate issues to higher management. Urquhart further argued that Weiss' portrayal of Libs of TikTok dangerously conflated conservative opinions with stochastic terrorism and extremism.

=== Bluesky ===
Libs of TikTok joined the social media platform Bluesky in late November among millions of users who joined the platform from Twitter as a result of the 2024 United States presidential election. The account was reportedly suspended after nine days on the platform on December 2, 2024. In a statement to The Advocate, a spokesperson for media watchdog GLAAD praised the account's removal: "Social media platforms have hate speech policies for a reason — to maintain a safe environment for all users, and advertisers, and especially to protect historically marginalized groups, such as LGBTQ people, who are disproportionately targeted with hate and harassment."

=== Other platforms ===
Libs of TikTok had an account on TikTok itself, but it was suspended for violating TikTok's community guidelines in March 2022. The Libs of TikTok Instagram account was suspended for a few hours two months later, which a Meta spokesperson said was from an automated system responding to "multiple copyright complaints". In September of that year, the Libs of TikTok Facebook account was permanently suspended for violating the platform's community guidelines. Facebook said it was suspended in error and the account was reinstated after less than a day, an action that the LGBTQ organization GLAAD criticized. Activists campaigned for e-commerce platform Shopify to drop Libs of TikTok's store, claiming that it violated the platform's acceptable use policy which bans hateful content and goods and services that lead to harassment and threats. In a statement, Shopify defended Libs of TikTok, saying that "We host businesses of all stripes and sizes, with various worldviews".

== Impact ==
=== Political impact ===
Florida governor Ron DeSantis's press secretary Christina Pushaw credited the account for "opening her eyes" on the current state of education around sexuality- and LGBTQ-related topics. Pushaw interacted with the Libs of TikTok account more than 100 times between July 2021 and May 2022. Fox News host Tucker Carlson has credited Libs of TikTok, and Pushaw's championing of it, as partly responsible for Florida's passage of the 2022 Parental Rights in Education bill (commonly called the "Don't Say Gay bill"), which prohibits instruction on sexuality and gender identity in age-inappropriate ways from kindergarten to third grade in public schools.

Libs of TikTok was one of the top-ten most influential Twitter accounts in promoting use of the pejorative term groomer after the passage of Florida's Parental Rights in Education bill, according to a report by the Center for Countering Digital Hate and the Human Rights Campaign. Raichik uses the term as a pejorative for LGBTQ people, supporters of LGBTQ youth, and those who teach about sexuality.

On March 5, 2024, Libs of TikTok account on Twitter posted a video linking an LGBTQ+ center in Philadelphia to the promotion of a "BDSM, kink and fetish" event, and accused Senators Bob Casey and John Fetterman of sending the center earmarked funds. On the same day, Fetterman's and Casey's offices requested the Congress to cut the earmarks worth US$1 million they initially proposed from the national spending bill that was about to pass. On March 6, however, Fetterman denied he himself took his office's decision, and implied his staffers were pushed by Libs of TikTok's accusations. In a later statement, Fetterman said his staff felt it was up to his office to "pull it or watch it get stripped out, attacked by Republicans, and ultimately killed" adding he would push for LGBTQ funds in 2025.

=== Harassment and threats ===
According to a report by Advance Democracy Inc., tweets by Libs of TikTok result in a spike in mentions of specific hospitals and doctors across Twitter. In many of the mentions, doctors are referred to as "child molesters", "pedos", "groomers", and "butchers".

Drag queens and drag events organizers said that they received harassment and threats after tweets from Libs of TikTok about them and their work. In 2021, Libs of TikTok encouraged its followers to call child protective services (CPS) on a transgender couple who were shown in the Facebook Watch documentary series 9 Months with Courteney Cox attempting to breastfeed their newborn baby.

In July 2022, OutLoud North Bay, a centre for LGBTQ youth in Ontario, received hate messages and death threats after Libs of TikTok posted tweets in response to the centre announcing a drag show for all ages. Also in July, Libs of TikTok made a tweet criticizing the Conservative Jewish camping network, Camp Ramah in Northern California, for "housing kids according to their gender identity rather than birth sex".

On August 10, 2022, Libs of TikTok reposted a video of a therapist who works with sex offenders who have been jailed. In the video, the therapist says their pronouns and advises people to use the term "minor-attracted persons" (MAPs) instead of "pedophiles", arguing that the latter term has "moved from being a diagnostic label to being a judgmental, hurtful insult that we hurl at people in order to harm them or slander them". They also argue that pedophiles do not choose their attraction to children and should not be solely defined by that one aspect of themselves. Libs of TikTok only posted the first two minutes of the video, which made it sound like the therapist was advocating for acceptance of pedophilia and for people to be nicer to child sex abusers. In the full version of the video, the therapist condemns child sex abuse crimes. Libs of TikTok's reposted video has been promoted by Russian and European disinformation networks, such as Tsargrad TV.

Michael O'Brien, a pediatrics resident at a hospital in South Carolina, said that he received threats after Libs of TikTok, on August 15, retweeted a tweet in which he had criticized the account. O'Brien reported some of the threats to his employer's public safety office: "I got three specific threats that came from within a 50-mile radius of where I live", adding that "The threats felt very tangible. I had to take action to protect my partner and warn my family."

In September 2022, Libs of TikTok claimed that workshops for transgender youth and their families run by the American healthcare company Kaiser Permanente were being held "without parental consent" despite the workshops being designed for both children and parents. Also in September 2022, a tea shop in Salt Lake City reported receiving "an endless barrage of harassment" after Libs of TikTok's Instagram account reposted a video featuring a young girl dancing with a drag queen inside the tea shop.

On September 23, 2022, a two-minute video of Dr. Katherine Gast (co-director at the University of Wisconsin-Madison's UW Health gender services program) describing gender-affirming surgeries was reposted by Libs of TikTok with the caption: "Gast happily describes some of the "gender affirming" surgeries she offers to adolescents including vaginoplasties, phalloplasties, and double mastectomies." In an emailed response to NBC News, Libs of TikTok stood by her characterization of doctors who work in transgender healthcare. Although Gast does not perform genital surgery on minors, she does perform mastectomies (also known as "top surgery") in some cases for older teenagers after evaluations by mental health care professionals and doctors, and with parental consent. The original tweet by Libs of TikTok received almost half a million views, one of eight in a thread about Gast and her patients. Senator Ted Cruz tweeted: "She does this to children. Sterilizes & mutilates them. Before they are old enough to consent." Gast and her family were doxxed and her clinic has received "harassing phone calls".

In April 2024, over forty Planet Fitness establishments throughout the United States received bomb threats after Libs of TikTok posted that a customer was banned for photographing a transgender woman while she used the women's room. In August 2025, Libs of TikTok falsely claimed that Connecticut state representative Corey Paris had doxxed Immigration and Customs Enforcement agents, resulting in racist threats against him.

After analyzing Libs of TikTok's online activity in April 2022 through November 2022, a counter-extremism research group named "Task Force Butler Institute" estimated Raichik singled out a specific event, location or person over 280 times, resulting in 66 incidents of harassment or threats against her targets.

In the aftermath of the killings of Renée Good and Alex Pretti by federal agents, Libs of TikTok doxxed individuals who criticized immigration authorities or expressed sympathy for Good or Pretti, "in a seeming attempt to punish them, either by public harassment or professional retaliation".

== Reception ==
=== Response to account content ===
The account has been described as promoting harassment against and criticizing teachers, medical providers, and children's hospitals. It has been called a hate-speech account. It has also been described as spreading misinformation and disinformation by reposting videos clips of teachers, LGBTQ people, schools and other institutions out of context and with incendiary framing. While fans and supporters of Libs of TikTok say the account simply reposts content showcasing "sex and gender ideology" that was already publicly available, "the account's followers are rabidly anti-LGBTQ+ and routinely attack individuals whose content is shared."

Raichik has described Libs of TikTok's reposting of videos as "exposés" of "the crazies". She has also described criticism of her online activity as efforts to "cancel and silence" and has said that she receives death threats.

==== Positive ====
Tucker Carlson, then the host of Tucker Carlson Tonight, praised Libs of TikTok, saying that "no news organization in America has done more to reveal the reality in American schools than Libs of TikTok" and called the videos reposted by the account "idiotic and disgusting". Donald Trump Jr. argued that "the question Libs of TikTok often raises – And the Left wants to ignore – Is do parents have a right to know what their children are being taught in their public school, or not?" Ben Shapiro defended Libs of TikTok from criticism, calling it "a Twitter account that literally just posts Leftists owning themselves." Seth Dillon of The Babylon Bee called Libs of TikTok's work "heroic" and "high-risk". Christina Pushaw has described herself as "a strong supporter of [Libs of TikTok']s mission."

==== Negative ====
Gillian Branstetter, a media strategist for the American Civil Liberties Union, argued that Libs of TikTok "is finding new characters for right-wing propaganda" and that "it's relying on the endless stream of content from TikTok and the Internet to cast any individual trans person as a new villain in their story." Ari Drennen, the LGBTQ program director for the left-leaning media watchdog group Media Matters for America, argued that "Libs of TikTok is basically acting as a wire service for the broader right-wing media ecosystem", adding that the account has "been shaping public policy in a real way, and affecting teachers' ability to feel safe in their classrooms". According to Drennen, she received more than 500 hateful comments about her sexuality and appearance after criticizing Libs of TikTok. Kylie Cheung of Jezebel argued that "Deplatforming hateful accounts like LibsOfTikTok – whose online attacks can clearly, quickly escalate into real-life threats – is an important step. But it's clear we're in the midst of a terrifying, broader anti-LGBTQ moment right now that's being fueled by pretty much every right-wing media outlet as well as top Republicans." Reina Sultan of Them argued that "social media platforms are not doing enough, not only to limit Libs of TikTok's ability to spread hate, but also to protect LGBTQ+ people in general." Elad Nehorai of The Forward argued that Libs of TikTok is "fueling a pogrom against trans youth", comparing accusations of grooming to antisemitic blood libel. LGBTQ organization GLAAD said in a statement that "Libs of TikTok is synonymous with maliciously targeting LGBTQ organizations, people, and allies by posting lies, misinformation, and blatant hate."

Joan Donovan, research director at Harvard's Shorenstein Center on Media, Politics and Public Policy, argued that "we've reached this phase in social media where people know what to do when an account like Libs of TikTok calls out another account or a person or institution", calling the response to these posts "networked incitement" that can create "a snowball effect, where you see people getting more emboldened to participate". Donovan also argued that "the precipitating comments may not be that incendiary, but if that creates a pattern of attack that is recognizable, which it is with an account like Libs of TikTok, then these companies are well within their jurisdiction to warn and then ban the account." Donovan has drawn parallels between Twitter's handling of Libs of TikTok and Twitter's failure to stop QAnon, the Stop the Steal movement, and the January 6 Capitol attack, which Twitter only started cracking down on after several acts of violence were linked to these movements. She also drew parallels between right-wing media amplifying Libs of TikTok and the online campaign that resulted in the January 6 Capitol attack. Donovan noted that "We're seeing more people feeling — as they did during the insurrection — that storming a hospital might be their only option to defend themselves and their values". Harvard Law School clinical instructor and transgender activist Alejandra Caraballo argued that Twitter has not banned Libs of TikTok for its content because "they don't want to rock the boat politically while the [Elon Musk purchase] is ongoing." Meredithe McNamara, assistant professor of pediatrics at Yale University, argued that "allowing this hate speech to fester on the internet and fuel direct threats is going to create long standing harms that are difficult to recover from".

=== Response to identity reveal ===
Bonnie Kristian of The Week argued "the person behind Libs of TikTok doesn't matter much ... because conspiracism is communal now", adding that "Lorenz's exposé largely missed the point." Dan McLaughlin of National Review argued that identity reveals like that of Libs of TikTok have "become standard practice for major media reporters who do stories on people on the right who can be framed as 'extremists.'"

Kara Alaimo, a Hofstra University professor and former Obama administration staffer writing for NBC News, dismissed criticism regarding identifying the individual running the account, arguing that "the people in need of protection here are those who are being targeted with hate simply because of their identities – not the people who are hurling the abuse, like Raichik."

Writing about the revealing of Raichik's identity, Kaitlyn Tiffany of The Atlantic argued that "where the term [doxxing] once defined a category, it now expresses an emotion. Whoever feels doxxed will claim to have been doxxed."

Commentator and conspiracy theorist Jack Posobiec tweeted: "This isn't journalism. This is doxxing and smearing of Libs of TikTok by the billionaire-controlled Bezos Post".

Some Jewish critics, including watchdog organization StopAntisemitism.org and Jewcy magazine editor Isaac de Castro, argued that Lorenz's mention of Raichik's Orthodox Judaism was unnecessary and promoted antisemitism. Andrew Silow-Carroll, editor in chief of The Jewish Week, defended the inclusion of Raichik's religious beliefs in a blog for The Times of Israel, arguing that it "shed light on the growing connection between faith and right-wing politics".

In April 2022, another Orthodox Jew also named Chaya Raichik, a stay-at-home mom who grew up in Los Angeles, received hundreds of negative messages from people who mistook her for the person behind Libs of TikTok. Also in April, YouTuber Tim Pool and The Daily Wire CEO Jeremy Boreing purchased a billboard in Times Square to accuse Lorenz of doxxing Libs of TikTok. In response, Lorenz called the billboard "so idiotic it's hilarious."

=== Classifications of extremism ===
In March 2024, the Southern Poverty Law Center (SPLC) added Chaya Raichik to their hate watchlist as an anti-LGBTQ extremist. The entry describes Raichik as having engaged in an "anti-LGBTQ+ disinformation campaign" that "mobilizes right-wing extremist groups in violent attacks against LGBTQ+ people, spaces and events, as well as against doctors, hospitals, librarians, libraries, teachers and schools."

== Other media involvement by Raichik ==
=== Television appearance ===
Raichik made her first-ever in-person televised appearance on the December 27, 2022, episode of Tucker Carlson Today. In the episode, she stated, "The LGBTQ community has become this cult, and it's so captivating, and it pulls people in so strongly... They're just evil. They're bad people. They're just evil people, and they want to groom kids. They're recruiting." Following her appearance, some news outlets have linked her to a person who may have trespassed on federal property during the January 6 United States Capitol attack.

=== Children's book ===
In 2023, Raichik announced her children's picture book No More Secrets: The Candy Cavern, whose publisher is Brave Books. Promoted as "a modern twist to the familiar Grimm's-style fairy tale", the book is about a lamb named Rose who becomes suspicious when her second-grade teacher focuses more on candy than education. It reflects the LGBTQ grooming conspiracy theory; Raichik intended the book for helping children and their parents identify "predatory" behavior. Brave Books' storytime event which was to star Raichik and promote the book was canceled due to threats they viewed as dangerous.

=== Political appointments ===
In January 2024, Raichik was appointed as an adviser to the Oklahoma State Library Committee, despite not being an Oklahoma resident, a librarian, or an educator. The committee is tasked with reviewing material reported to them and advising schools on age appropriate media.

== See also ==
- LGBTQ rights in the United States
- Transphobia in the United States
- 2020s anti-LGBTQ movement in the United States
