= The Jewish News =

The Jewish News may refer to:

- Jewish News of London
- Cleveland Jewish News
- The Detroit Jewish News
- New Jersey Jewish News
- J. The Jewish News of Northern California, published since 1895
