= Gary Rosenblatt =

Journalist, editor, and publisher

- Born: February 25, 1947; Baltimore, Md.
- Occupations: Journalist, Editor, Publisher
- Notable credit(s): Editor of the Baltimore Jewish Times for 19 years; Casey Medal for Meritorious Journalism (2000); Pulitzer Prize finalist (1985)
- Title: Editor-in-chief and Publisher, The Jewish Week

Gary Rosenblatt (born 1947) is a journalist. He was the editor and publisher of The Jewish Week of New York, a position he held from 1993 through 2019. Previously he was the editor of the Baltimore Jewish Times for 19 years. Rosenblatt is the father of musician Dov.

== Early career ==
In 1972, Charles "Chuck" Buerger, the grandson of the founder of the Baltimore Jewish Times, became the weekly's publisher. In 1974 he hired Gary Rosenblatt as editor. The two expanded the scope of the paper's coverage, as well as the size; in the 1980s the paper regularly exceeded 200 pages, and circulation peaked at over 20,000. In 1984 Buerger acquired The Jewish News of Detroit, and Rosenblatt was named editor, in addition to his responsibilities in Baltimore. In 1988 Buerger bought The Atlanta Jewish Times, adding Rosenblatt as editor there as well. The Detroit and Atlanta papers were given similar makeovers, including an emphasis on more and deeper local reporting and enhanced graphics before Rosenblatt left for The Jewish Week in 1993.

== Notable articles ==
=== The Simon Wiesenthal Center's Holocaust Memorial ===
While at the Baltimore Jewish Times, Rosenblatt published an article on September 14, 1984, titled "The Simon Wiesenthal Center: State-of-the-art Activism or Hollywood Hype?" analyzing whether Wiesenthal Center officials were truthful in marketing their Holocaust museum as a non-sectarian, humanitarian institution in order to receive funding from the state of California.

This article was one of two finalists for the Pulitzer Prize in the category of Special Reporting in 1985. The honor marked the first time an article in a Jewish publication was cited in the Pulitzer competition.

=== Sexual Harassment Investigation of Baruch Lanner ===
On June 23, 2000, The Jewish Week published an article by Rosenblatt titled "Stolen Innocence," investigating a long list of sexual harassment charges against Orthodox rabbi Baruch Lanner, an Orthodox Union educator who worked closely with teenagers for more than three decades. The article also reported that the Orthodox Union was aware of Lanner's behavior but chose not to take any action. On learning of the newspaper's investigation—which included on-the-record interviews with many of Lanner's victims—OU officials asked Rosenblatt not to go to press, but he did anyway. Later, the OU forced the rabbi to resign and commissioned an independent inquiry; two congregations suspended their OU membership in protest; more victims came forward and filed complaints with local prosecutors; at least two rabbis used their pulpits to castigate the paper and a major advertiser threatened to lead a boycott.

Lanner was arrested, and on June 27, 2002, he was convicted of sexually abusing two teenage girls in incidents dating back to 1992 and 1997. He was sentenced to seven years in prison. An appeals court dismissed one of the child endangerment charges in 2005. He was released on parole on January 10, 2008, and will remain on parole for four years.

The Jewish Week received both praises for its reporting as well as criticism from the New York Jewish community.
