= Ritzenberg =

Ritzenberg is a surname. Notable people with the surname include:

- Albert Ritzenberg (1918–2018), American tennis player and coach
- Amy Graves, née Ritzenberg, American physicist
- Phillip Ritzenberg (1931–2022), American journalist
