= David Twersky =

David Twersky may refer to:

- David Twersky (journalist) (1950–2010), journalist, Zionist activist, and peace advocate in Israel and the United States
- David Twersky (Skverer Rebbe) (born 1940), Grand Rabbi and spiritual leader of the village of New Square, New York
