= Emily Morse =

American sex therapist, author, and media personality

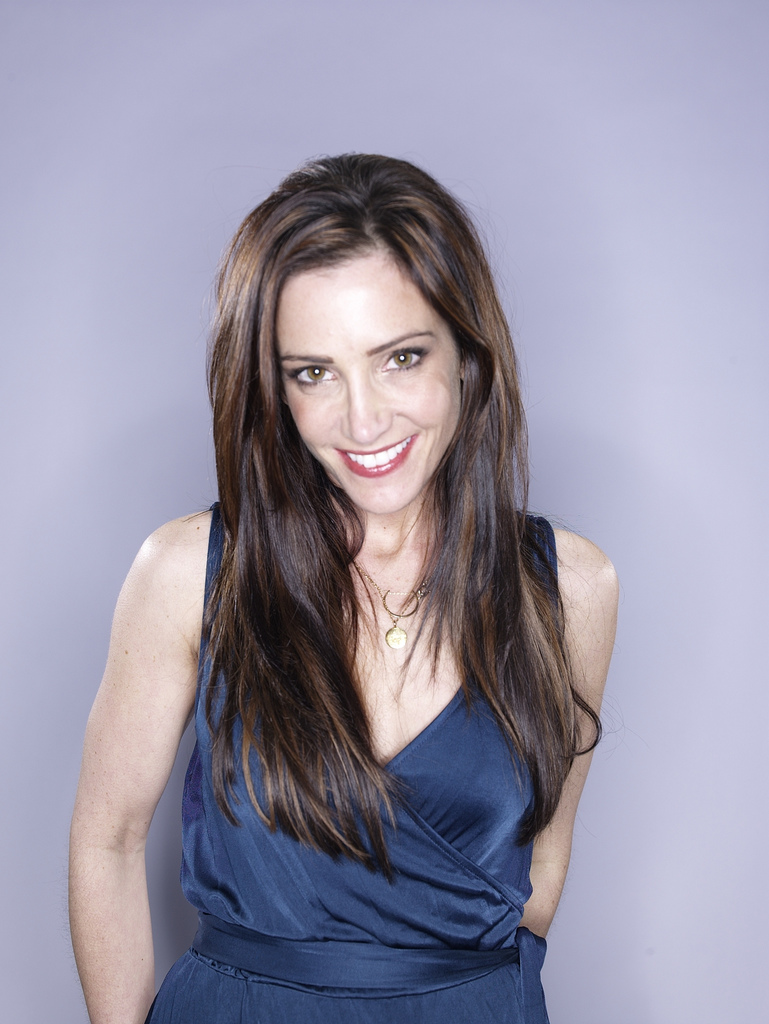
- Morse in 2012
- Born: Emily Hope Morse; June 2, 1970 (age 56); Farmington Hills, Michigan, United States
- Education: University of Michigan; Institute for Advanced Study of Human Sexuality
- Occupations: Sex therapist, author, media personality
- Website: https://sexwithemily.com/

Emily Hope Morse (born June 2, 1970) is an American sex therapist, author and media personality. She is the host of the long-running podcast Sex with Emily and is also known for her 2012 recurring reality television appearance in Bravo's series Miss Advised (2012).

== Career ==
Morse has appeared as a guest expert on many radio and television shows, and has been featured in The New York Times, The Los Angeles Times, and San Francisco Chronicle for her expertise in sex and relationships. Her first book Hot Sex: Over 200 Things You Can Try Tonight was released in October 2011. Morse has also acted in, produced, and directed the film, for which she received an award. Her podcast, Sex with Emily, has been in production since 2005.

In 2012 Morse began a four-year run as guest co-host on the nationally syndicated Loveline radio show with Dr. Drew Pinsky.

Morse contributes frequently to many major online publications including Glamour, Cosmopolitan, Ask Men, Popsugar, Pattiknows.com, Men's Health, and Harper's Bazaar.

In 2014, Morse became the host of the regularly-recurring Sexual Health Expo. Morse also serves as the sexual health expert for Lifestyles. She has been featured in The New York Times and The New York Times Magazine.

Since 2021, Morse has been teaching a MasterClass on sex and communication.

== Education ==
Morse holds two bachelor's degrees from the University of Michigan in psychology and political science. Morse attended Institute for Advanced Study of Human Sexuality in San Francisco and received a certificate in human sexuality. Morse is also an alumna of the Somatica Institute in San Francisco where she received training as a sex and relationship coach.

== Books ==
- Emily Morse; Jamye Waxman (2011). Hot Sex: Over 200 Things You Can Try Tonight. Weldon Owen. ISBN 9781616280734. OCLC 709681836.

== Radio shows ==
- Sex with Emily (podcast)
- Loveline Radio (special guest co-host)
- Sirius XM

== Television series ==
- Miss Advised, airing on Bravo (premiered June 18, 2012)

== Film ==
- See How They Run (2003) Morse produced & directed
- I Am a Sex Addict, 2005, Morse acted
