= Baltimore Jewish Times =

Weekly newspaper in Baltimore, Maryland, US

The Baltimore Jewish Times
- Type: Weekly newspaper
- Owner(s): Mid-Atlantic Media, LLC
- Founder: David Alter
- Publisher: Craig Burke
- Editor: N. Aaron Troodler
- Founded: 1919
- Headquarters: 9200 Rumsey Road, Suite 215, Columbia, MD 21045
- Circulation: 10,000
- Sister newspapers: Washington Jewish Week
- ISSN: 0005-450X
- OCLC number: 42077559 3981984; 42077559
- Website: jewishtimes.com

The Baltimore Jewish Times is a weekly newspaper aimed at the Jewish community of Baltimore.

== History ==
The newspaper was founded in 1919 by David Alter, and at one time it was the largest Jewish publication in the country. Alter built a chain of seven newspapers, but only two survived the Great Depression, including the Baltimore Jewish Times.

In 1972, the paper was taken over by Charles "Chuck" Buerger, the grandson of the founder, and in 1974 he was joined by Gary Rosenblatt as editor. The two expanded the scope of the paper's coverage, as well as the size; in the 1980s the paper regularly exceeded 200 pages, and circulation peaked at over 20,000. In the 1980s the two also acquired The Detroit Jewish News and The Atlanta Jewish Times, which were given similar makeovers.

Rosenblatt left in 1993 to become editor of New York's The Jewish Week. Buerger started the Palm Beach Jewish Times in November 1994, and launched a Boca Raton/Delray Beach edition in August 1996.

Buerger died in 1996, and the paper was taken over by his son Andrew. In 1998, Andrew Buerger sold off the Florida newspapers, and in 2000, he sold the Detroit and Atlanta papers to Jewish Renaissance Media.

Phil Jacobs, a Baltimore native and former Jewish Times reporter who had been serving as editor of the Detroit paper, was named executive editor of the Baltimore Jewish Times in 1997. During his tenure, the paper published a series of investigative reports on child molestation by members of the rabbinate, in which Jacobs revealed that he had been molested himself as a child. The series won critical acclaim, but also provoked outrage from some members of the Orthodox community, who disputed some of the accusations made. Jacobs' experience writing the series and living through the controversy it raised in his community was chronicled in Standing Silent, a 2010 documentary film by director Scott Rosenfelt (producer of Mystic Pizza and Home Alone, among others).

Jacobs left the Baltimore Jewish Times in June 2011 to become editor of Washington Jewish Week. Andrew Buerger then became editor and publisher, and continues to run the publication's former parent company, Alter Communications, which also published Baltimore STYLE magazine and a number of custom publications.

In 2011, the Baltimore Jewish Times underwent a major redesign and became more magazine-like, glossy coated paper, a smaller page size, and more color photography and graphics. In 2012, the publication was sold at a bankruptcy auction and purchased by Route 95 Publications LLC, owner of the Washington Jewish Week.

== Awards ==
In 2006 the Baltimore Jewish Times won a 2005 Simon Rockower Award for Excellence in News Reporting and Writing about Scientific and Technological Innovation Out of Israel from the American Jewish Press Association. The paper won six Simon Rockower Awards in 2020, one in 2021, and another two in 2022. In 2023, the American Jewish Press Association awarded the Baltimore Jewish Times one Rockower Award.

== See also ==
- Jewish Week
