= Washington Jewish Week =

Newspaper in Rockville, Maryland

- Type: Weekly newspaper
- Format: Broadsheet and online editions
- Owner: Mid-Atlantic Media
- Publisher: Craig Burke
- Managing editor: Aaron Troodler
- Founded: 1930, as National Jewish Ledger
- Political alignment: Independent
- Headquarters: Columbia, Maryland
- Circulation: 10,000
- Sister newspapers: Baltimore Jewish Times
- ISSN: 0746-9373
- Website: washingtonjewishweek.com

Washington Jewish Week (WJW) is an independent community weekly newspaper whose logo reads, "Serving the nation's capital and the greater Washington Jewish community since 1930." Its main office is located in Columbia, Maryland, a Maryland suburb in Howard County.

== Editorial staff ==
As of March 2011, Richard Greenberg, the paper's associate editor, was also Interim Editor, while the paper searched for a new permanent editor. The March 3, 2011, edition of WJW was the first to list Greenberg as Interim Editor.

As of June 2011, Phil Jacobs, former executive editor of the Baltimore Jewish Times, was the editor of Washington Jewish Week. Mr. Jacobs hired Meredith Jacobs (not related) to be managing editor at the company. Meredith Jacobs replaced him as editor in September 2013. She left in February 2014 and Joshua Runyan was listed as interim editor. As of June 2014, Geoffrey Melada was editor-in-chief.

As of 2015, Joshua Runyan became editorial director of Mid-Atlantic Media, publisher of Washington Jewish Week, and assumed the editor-in-chief role with WJW. David Holzel was elevated to the role of managing editor.

Aaron Troodler is now the managing editor of Washington Jewish Week.

== Circulation ==
As of March 2, 2011, the paper's website states that it has a paid circulation that reaches more than 30,000 readers, although an article in another paper, The Forward, published on that same date, estimates the circulation to be 10,000. In 2010 it won an award in a category for newspapers with circulations under 15,000.

Under former editor Debra Rubin, the WJW initiated an "aggressive foray" into social networking sites such as Facebook and Twitter in an effort to attract younger readers. While some other papers are making the move to solely online projects, Rubin said the paper is "not moving away from our print edition by any means. We're just trying to supplement our print edition."

== Content ==
The paper has both a hard-copy and online version, with sections identified online including News, Opinion, Arts & Culture, People, Podcasts, Obituaries and Special Sections.

=== News ===
News stories on the web edition are divided into five categories: Local, National, Israel, World and Synagogue Spotlight.

=== Weekly Kibbitz ===
This section, in print only, is a compilation of articles from the news, usually Jewish Telegraphic Agency. In March 2011, some examples of the news in this category included "Bone marrow drive for Hadassah leader," "Israeli killed, Chabad House destroyed in [New Zealand] quake," and "Fliers attack [Rahm] Emanuel."

=== Opinion ===
This section includes editorials, opinions (op-eds), letters to the editor and reader poll results.

=== Arts ===
Articles that include both a local focus, such as a local Jewish Community Center art exhibit, to news articles with a focus on the arts, such as "Jewish talent shines at 2011 Academy Awards."

=== Jewish life ===
Information on individual and family milestones, such as births, bar and bat (b'nai) mitzvah news, engagements and marriages, obituaries, anniversaries, and birthdays, in addition to additional sections, including recipes and a holiday calendar.

=== Features ===
The Features section includes "You Should Know" and "Last Word" (features on local Jewish residents), "D'var Torah" (remarks linked to the weekly Torah portion) and a news feature story typically by Jewish Telegraphic Agency.

== Editorial policy ==
In August 2010, when a group of local businessmen took over the paper, they stated that they would like the paper to be "a tool for increasing the number of people involved in the Jewish community." Louis Mayberg, one of the owners, added that this goal would be pursued while keeping the paper committed to "the highest journalistic standards": "That means accurately and fairly reporting the news in the community and not editorializing," Mayberg said.

=== 2011 controversy ===
When the long-time editor (since 1999) Debra Rubin was fired on February 23, 2011, some reports questioned whether one underlying issue leading to her discharge was the unwritten policy of the paper to avoid criticism of the Jewish Federation of Greater Washington, DC — with one unnamed source claiming that the new owners "felt the paper was owned by the federation...and tried to fight any negative reporting on the institution." The paper's owners claimed that such criticisms of Federation funding decisions had no bearing on their decision to seek a new editor. They attributed the decision to "creative differences" with Rubin and the owners' desire to take the paper in "a new direction."

One issue cited as an example of friction over the issue of Federation support (or non-criticism) was a report by reporter Adam Kredo in a February 17 blog posting that there was "dismay among several federation donors" with that organization's financial support of Theater J, the theater group associated with the Washington, D.C. Jewish Community Center. "Theater J" had hosted a production of Return to Haifa, an adaptation of a novella by Palestinian Ghassan Kanafani, which some critics had claimed was "anti-Israel". On February 22, additional criticism of the Federation was posted on the blog because of this theatrical production.

According to reports, the situation at this paper reflected a similar struggle affecting the larger Jewish press: "The firing highlights a struggle for editorial freedom at many Jewish publications. While some of the papers are owned outright by the local federation, even independent publications like Washington Jewish Week encounter difficulties when touching on issues relating to communal institutions."

Some leaders of the community voiced concern about the possibility that the paper might lose some of its editorial freedom. For example, Rabbi Shmuel Herzfeld, rabbi of Ohev Sholom - The National Synagogue, praised what he considered the "wonderful motivation and intentions" of the new owners, but added that: "they have ended up doing something that ultimately won't be helpful for the community. I don't think the community deserves to lose an independent voice that has served as a check on the Federation."

== History ==
=== Founding ===
The paper was founded in 1930 as the National Jewish Ledger, with its first issue, published September 26, 1930, featuring a New Year's message to the Jewish community from President Herbert Hoover.

The paper was known under a number of names over the years, until it officially adopted the name Washington Jewish Week in 1983. During its early years it was known as the Jewish Week, National Jewish Ledger, and later, after merging with the New York publication The American Examiner, it became The Jewish Week and the American Examiner. From 1975 to 1983 it was simply called Jewish Week.

=== Leonard Kapiloff ===
In 1983, Dr. Leonard Kapiloff, a dentist and former publisher of the Sentinel newspapers in suburban Maryland, purchased the paper, continuing as owner until his 1993 death. Among the paper's staff during Kapiloff's tenure were Michael Berenbaum, Larry Cohler-Esses, Judith Colp, Charles Fenyvesi, Buzzy Gordon, and Henry Srebrnik.

During Kapiloff's tenure in the 1980s and 1990s, by virtue of its geography and the quality of its staff, the Washington Jewish Week became a very influential paper and regularly published stories picked up by the mainstream press. In January 1986, for example, Gordon broke the story of how then Israeli ambassador to the US Meir Rosenne was being bypassed by the Israeli government in its dealings with the Reagan administration in the Iran-Contra affair, where arms were being traded for hostages and money. According to a 2004 interview with Michael Berenbaum about that story, Ambassador Rosenne protested and the Israeli Embassy was "livid," because of their feeling that "When the Washington Jewish Week puts that on the front page, it weakens the Israeli ambassador, at a time when he needs to be strong. Israel's in danger, etc."

Toward the end of Kapiloff's tenure, the paper lost some of its prominence along with much of its core staff. Editors Fenyvesi, Srebrnik and Renee Matalon as well as writers Berenbaum and Gordon all left in the mid- and late-1980s. Berenbaum and Srebrnik later became academics at universities in Los Angeles and Charlottetown, PEI, Canada, respectively. Gordon, who had been director of the news department of the Israel Government Press Office and official spokesman for Israel's Kahan Commission, became media relations director for B'nai B'rith International and later wrote Frommer's Jerusalem Day by Day Guide. Judith Colp later married the late Barry Rubin, founder of the Rubin Center for Research in International Affairs, formerly the Global Research in International Affairs (GLORIA) Center, located at the Interdisciplinary Center (IDC) in Herzliya, Israel. Barry and Judith Colp Rubin together authored a number of books on American, Israeli and Middle Eastern politics.

==== AIPAC controversy ====
In 1992, a story by Robert Friedman was published in Village Voice, accusing Kapiloff of firing WJW managing editor Andrew Silow-Carroll as a result of a move by the American Israel Public Affairs Committee (AIPAC) to "flex its muscles" when the editor "didn't toe the AIPAC line." According to Friedman's account Silow-Carroll was forced out "after an AIPAC staff member operating under cover witnessed Silow-Carroll's appearance at a May 1991 picnic sponsored by dovish Jewish groups, including the New Jewish Agenda and Tikkun magazine. As a result of Silow-Carroll's attendance, an AIPAC memo was written that characterized Silow-Carroll as anti-Israel — although Silow-Carroll saw himself as anti-Likud but absolutely not anti-Israel. Friedman's Village Voice story led to many others in the Jewish press, including a Jewish Telegraphic Agency August 13 story, published in the WJW itself, ""Was former WJW editor target of AIPAC 'spying'?"

According to the story, shortly after receiving the memo, Kapiloff brought in a new editor, Linda Gordon Kuzmack, to serve over Silow-Carroll, who was stripped of his story-assignment and editorial writing responsibilities, and soon left the paper. Kapiloff denied that the change was a result of the AIPAC memo, but instead just a movie that resulted from the fact that the paper was "not growing" during Silow-Carroll's tenure. Eventually, after Silow-Carroll's departure, Kuzmack was also dismissed.

Like the more recent 2011 discharge of Debra Rubin, some — including Larry Cohler-Esses — believe the Silow-Carroll departure reveals the larger tension between those who believe that the priority of the Jewish press is to report the news and those who believe it involves the role of supporter or "cheerleader" for certain organizations and political positions. Cohler-Esses states in a 2004 interview that AIPAC tried to get him fired, in addition to the pressure they leveled on WJW to fire Silow-Carroll.

=== Better Built Group ===
In April 1999, the paper's "family ownership" came to an end when WJW was purchased by Better Built Group, a newly formed affiliate of Ryan Phillips' NewsCo., the parent company of Alexandria-based Journal Newspapers. At that time, news of "a so-called shift in editorial focus and new employee guidelines" introduced by the new owner raised questions about "cultural sensitivity" that might not, in the words of a Washington Business Journal report, be "kosher."

According to the new owners, changes were made to improve the "financial outlook" of a paper that was "formerly family-owned," but a reduction of vacation allowances for holidays — originally set to accommodate Jewish holy days — from 11 to 4, would raise difficulty for observant Jews. Additional changes that included a requirement that the entire staff punch a time clock and a reduction in editorial space for the sake of increased advertising revenue, were seen as moves that would "diminish" the paper's standing at the same time it would negatively impact on the staff's morale.

Other changes raised questions about the paper's continuing commitment to Jewish issues. Marcia Kay, a former managing editor, pointed out that this was the first time in many years that no reporter from the paper attended the annual meeting of the DC JCC. However, publisher Craig Burke, the paper's former advertising director, stated that the changes were merely part of the process of becoming "part of a larger corporation."

=== HarborPoint Media ===
In 2004, newly formed newspaper company HarborPoint Media, LLC, announced that it had purchased a number of newspaper assets, including Washington Jewish Week, from the Better Built Group.

Larry Fishbein, previously director of marketing and business development for the Kiplinger Washington Editors, was appointed president and publisher of the paper.

=== Mid-Atlantic Media ===
On August 1, 2010, the newspaper was sold to the WJW Group, LLC, a consortium of local businessmen David Butler, Allan Fox, Michael Gelman, Stuart Kurlander and Louis Mayberg. With the purchase, Larry Fishbein left the paper; Craig Burke, previous publisher of Washington Jewish Week, was hired as chief operating officer; and Debra Rubin continued as editor until her February 2011 discharge temporarily replaced by Richard Greenberg as interim editor.

In April 2012, WJW Group formed a subsidiary LLC that purchased the assets to Alter Communications, which included Baltimore Jewish Times, Baltimore Style magazine and a formidable custom publishing portfolio. Later in 2015, the company rebranded itself as Mid-Atlantic Media, owners and publishers of both Baltimore Jewish Times and Washington Jewish Week, as well as, providing certain media services for Pittsburgh Jewish Chronicle, The Jewish Exponent (Philadelphia) and Jewish News (Phoenix). Washington Jewish Week has won more than 20 journalism awards since 2010.

== Community support ==
The paper sponsors and co-sponsors a number of community events, including the Washington Jewish Film Festival, and the annual Jewish Book Festival.

WJW executives were often active in leadership roles in the organization American Jewish Press Association. As of 2010, for example, then-publisher Larry Fishbein was a member of the AJPA executive committee along. Debra Rubin and Craig Burke, as past presidents, are ex officio members of the executive committee.

== Awards ==
The newspaper has won a number of Simon Rockower Awards for excellence in Jewish Journalism, including the First Place Boris Smolar Award for Excellence in Comprehensive Coverage in 2004 and the First Place Award for Excellence in Editorial Writing in 2005. Columnist Buzzy Gordon won two Rockower Awards for the paper in 1985 and 1986.

Under then-editor Debra Rubin's leadership, the paper won a number of awards from the Maryland-Delaware-DC Press Association, including four first-place 2009 awards: two articles by Adam Kredo, "Now I understand" (in the category of feature, nonprofile) and "What is too much?" (category, local government reporting); one article by Richard Greenberg, "The fabric of Judaism" (category, religion); and the editorial by Debra Rubin, "Symbol of tolerance, target of hate" (category, editorial writing).

In 2010, WJW won a first place Simon Rockower Award for Excellence in Jewish Journalism, for the paper's coverage of the June 2009 shooting at the U.S. Holocaust Memorial Museum that left one guard dead. The award was presented for coverage that included three articles by Richard Greenberg, associate editor, Debra Rubin, editor, and Lisa Traiger, arts correspondent.

In 2023, WJW won six Rockower Awards.

== See also ==
- List of newspapers in Washington, D.C.
- List of Jewish newspapers in the United States
