= To Be a Jew Today =

2024 book by Noah Feldman

To Be a Jew Today: A New Guide to God, Israel, and the Jewish People
- Author: Noah Feldman
- Language: English
- Subject: Jewish identity, Judaism, Israel, Jewish theology
- Publisher: Farrar, Straus and Giroux
- Publication date: March 5, 2024
- Publication place: United States
- Media type: Print, e-book, audiobook
- Pages: 416
- ISBN: 978-0-374-29834-0

To Be a Jew Today: A New Guide to God, Israel, and the Jewish People is a 2024 book by American legal scholar Noah Feldman, the Felix Frankfurter Professor of Law at Harvard Law School. Feldman studies contemporary Jewish identity through three sections addressing Jewish conceptions of God, relationships with the State of Israel, and understandings of Jewish peoplehood. Rather than using traditional denominational categories, he organizes Jewish beliefs into four patterns he terms Traditional, Progressive, Evolutionist, and Godless, and argues that struggle with tradition and divinity constitutes a defining characteristic of Jewish experience across these categories. The book became a New York Times bestseller.

== Author ==
Feldman is the Felix Frankfurter Professor of Law at Harvard Law School and founding director of the Julis-Rabinowitz Program on Jewish and Israeli Law. Raised in an Orthodox Jewish home in Cambridge, Massachusetts, and educated at the Maimonides School, Feldman has built a career studying the intersection of power and ethics, including serving as senior constitutional advisor to the Coalition Provisional Authority in Iraq and testifying in the 2019 impeachment inquiry into President Donald Trump. In writing To Be a Jew Today, Feldman turned his analytical focus to his own Jewish faith to understand identity, politics, and culture. In a 2024 PBS News Hour interview with Amna Nawaz, he explained that the book emerged from his observation that Israel has become central to American Jewish identity over the past thirty to forty years, even for those critical of or rejecting Israel, who still find they must define themselves in relationship to it. Feldman expressed his desire to challenge the notion of being a bad Jew, and explained how the Jewish tradition never treats someone as ceasing to be Jewish or crossing a line into being bad, and that as long as one is striving to figure out what makes them Jewish and has love for other Jews and the spiritual, they are being a good Jew.

== Book summary ==
Feldman asks what it means to be Jewish today through three interconnected lenses: God, Israel, and Jewish peoplehood. The book was written as both a personal exploration and analytical study. Feldman addresses fundamental questions about Jewish meaning and purpose in the twenty-first century, and acknowledges the dramatic transformations that have occurred in Jewish thought and practice over recent decades.

The book's first section investiagtes Jewish beliefs about God through four distinct belief patterns that transcend traditional denominational boundaries. Rather than employing conventional sociological categories like Orthodox, Reform, or Conservative, Feldman identifies interior modes of belief he terms Traditional, Progressive, Evolutionist, and Godless.

The Traditional pattern encompasses those who view Jewish law as eternal and unchanging, interpreted through rabbinic authority that channels divine will. The Progressive pattern includes Jews who understand God's truth as consonant with evolving moral progress, emphasizing social justice and universal values. The Evolutionist approach seeks to acknowledge both the binding authority of Jewish law and its capacity for change through human interpretation over time, though this position presents significant intellectual and spiritual contradictions. The Godless pattern addresses those who maintain Jewish identity and practice without theistic belief, viewing Judaism as a civilization or cultural inheritance rather than a divine covenant.

The second section traces how the establishment and existence of the State of Israel has fundamentally transformed all streams of Jewish thought and identity. Feldman tracks the evolution from classical Zionism's secular nationalism to the contemporary reality where Israel has become integral to Jewish consciousness across the belief spectrum, though this centrality varies significantly by generation and political orientation.

The analysis encompasses Religious Zionism's messianic interpretations, showing how figures like Rabbi Abraham Isaac Kook developed theological frameworks that cast the Jewish state as part of divine redemption. The section addresses shifting attitudes among American Jews, especially how Progressive Jews have integrated Israel and the Holocaust as new pillars of contemporary theology since the mid-twentieth century, hence creating what Feldman identifies as a distinctly Progressive American Jewish synthesis.

The work also explores generational differences in how Progressive Jews relate to Israel in light of social justice commitments, and more so following events like the 1967 and 1973 wars and more recent conflicts. It examines how Traditionalist communities have evolved from principled anti-Zionism or non-Zionism to pragmatic engagement with the Israeli state, while maintaining theological reservations about secular nationalism. The discussion includes extremist settler ideology and its mystical underpinnings, as well as the moral challenges posed by sovereignty and the exercise of state power.

The third section conceptualizes Jewish peoplehood as a form of extended family, both real and imagined, examining how Jews relate to one another across religious, political, and geographical divides. Drawing on biblical narratives of patriarchal families with their patterns of love and conflict, particularly the story of Jacob wrestling with the divine and receiving the name Israel, Feldman explores contemporary challenges to Jewish collective identity.

Feldman develops what he terms a theology of struggle, based on the biblical narrative of Jacob wrestling with the divine and receiving the name Israel, meaning one who struggles with God. This theological framework suggests that contention, debate, and wrestling with tradition constitute essential aspects of Jewish experience across all belief patterns. The struggle manifests differently for each group: Traditionalists engage through Talmudic argumentation, Progressives through moral reinterpretation, Evolutionists through reconciling tradition with modernity, and even Godless Jews through their relationship with Jewish civilization and identity.

Feldman also addresses contemporary challenges facing Jewish communities, including declining institutional affiliation, generational tensions over Israel, questions of inclusion and egalitarianism, and the role of mystical and spiritual practices in modern Jewish life. He shows how the Holocaust has been integrated into various theological frameworks, from Progressive emphasis on Never Again as a universal moral imperative to its role in legitimating the State of Israel.

== Reviews ==
Robert Siegel characterized the work as an ambitious undertaking accomplished with deep appreciation of Jewish thought and scripture, willingness to be provocative, and considerable wit. Describing Feldman as a multilingual polymath whose CV reads like a sketch for a comic-book action hero, Siegel praised the diagnosis of progressive Jewish theology and its contemporary dilemmas. He also noted that Feldman classified Jews not by denominational affiliations but by underlying ideas and beliefs, therefore offering readers from many branches of the Jewish family tree a glimpse of other boughs and what their close and distant cousins make of life in the family. Siegel observed that despite Feldman's personal challenges with the Modern Orthodox community after his marriage, he remained remarkably generous in his treatment of diverse Jewish groups.

Hannah Joyner traced how the author tried to puzzle out what it means to be Jewish today by studying how different groups envision God and Israel. Rather than providing a simple delineation from ultra-Orthodox to Reform, Joyner explained, Feldman outlined a wide spectrum of specific Jewish beliefs about proper religious observance, including Traditionalists, Evolutionists, Progressives, and Godless Jews. Joyner observed that the work was published at an especially fraught moment when bonds within the diverse Jewish family were more strained than ever, much of that tension due to different and sometimes opposing viewpoints on Israel. She suggested that Feldman might be overly optimistic about the existence of deep familial love between politically conservative Traditionalist Jews and left-leaning Progressive Jews, though she emphasized how much Feldman himself loves the entire Jewish family.

Martin J. Raffel described the work as an extraordinary and unique achievement that demands to be read by all who want to understand the complexity of the Jewish people. Raffel found the second section dealing with how these four types of Jews relate to Zionism and Israel to be extraordinarily timely, though he noted that Feldman's assertion about Israel becoming a defining component of Jewishness was more correctly aspirational than descriptive, especially regarding the younger generation whose connection to Israel has undeniably weakened. The third section on Jewish peoplehood, Raffel noted, grappled with difficult concepts and sought to answer the age-old question of who is inside and outside the Jewish tent.

Joy Getnick observed that in Feldman's estimation, past conceptions of Jewish life and ideas no longer accurately reflect what he perceives to be the current landscape of Jewish practice and thought. Getnick explained that Feldman sought to create a new map broken into three areas of Jewish thought: God, Israel, and community, resulting in an impressive and insightful assessment of the complexities of modern Jewish existence. Getnick emphasized that Feldman did not set out to tell the reader how to be Jewish or what makes someone a good or bad Jew. Rather, his intent was to help the reader chart their own path and understand those of the Jews around them.
