= Julia Allison =

American journalist and media personality (born 1981)

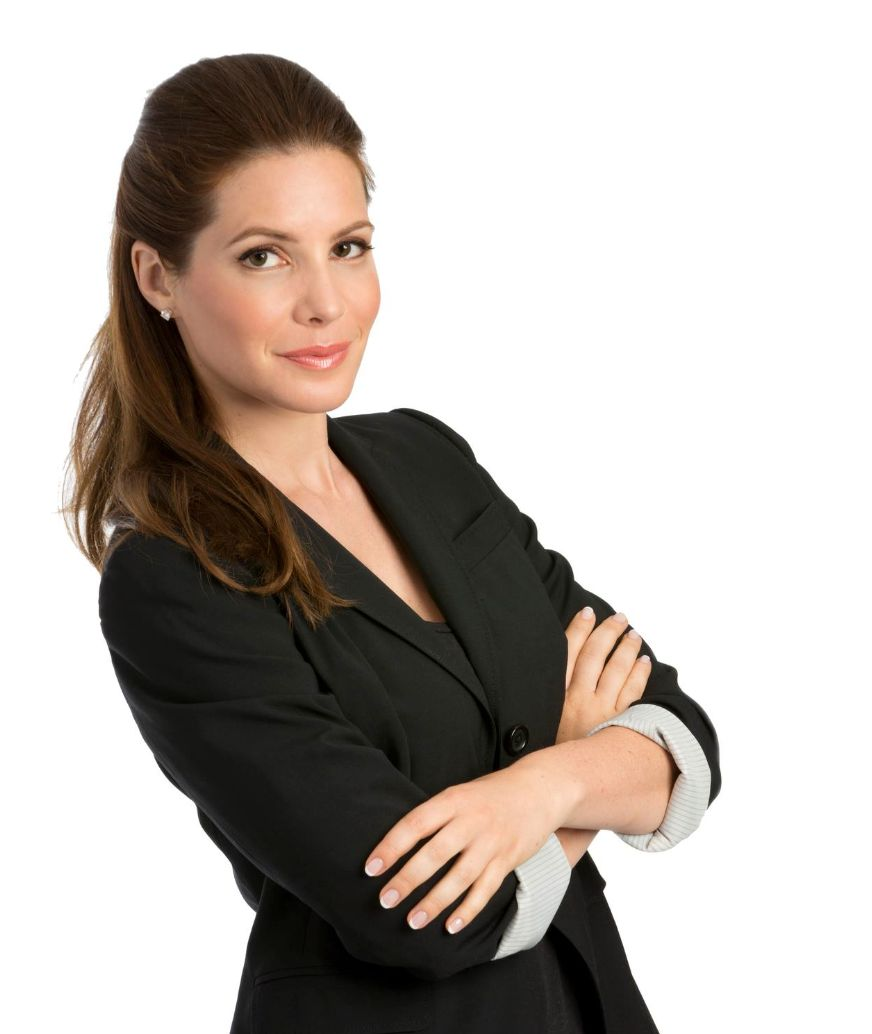
- Allison in 2013
- Born: February 28, 1981 (age 45); Wilmette, Illinois, U.S.
- Education: Georgetown University (BA); Harvard Kennedy School (MPA)
- Occupations: Journalist, columnist, media personality, entrepreneur, speaker
- Partner: Noah Feldman (2020-present)
- Website: juliaallison.com

Julia Allison (born February 28, 1981) is an American journalist, media personality, and entrepreneur.

As of 2025, Allison is a Shorenstein Fellow at Harvard University's Shorenstein Center on Media, Politics and Public Policy for Fall 2025 and Spring 2026, where her work explores the intersection of social and legacy media with a focus on technology, culture, and social impact.

== Early life and education ==
Allison grew up in Wilmette, Illinois. She earned a degree in government from Georgetown University in 2004 and received a master's degree from the Harvard Kennedy School in 2025.

== Career ==
=== Early career ===
While at Georgetown University, Allison worked for Mark Kirk, then a member of the House of Representatives from Illinois, serving as a Legislative Correspondent and Legislative Assistant for the 107th United States Congress, the youngest full time legislative staffer at the time. She subsequently covered politics on-air during the 2004 general election for Comcast.

Allison was among the earliest figures to explore the emerging intersection of personal storytelling, technology, and digital identity. Through her blogs and presence on platforms such as Twitter and Tumblr, she developed a serialized narrative style that would later become central to influencer culture. Long before social media "influencers" were a defined category, she referred to her practice as “lifecasting,” a continuous, multimedia documentation of her daily life, work, relationships, and creative pursuits.

In 2002, while attending Georgetown University, Allison began writing Sex on the Hilltop, the university's first sex column. This column was notable for being among the first of its kind at a Catholic university, addressing topics that were considered taboo within the institution. The column attracted national attention, leading to a Washington Post article about her work.

=== Media & TV Career ===
==== Journalism (Print, TV & Online) ====
After graduating in 2004, Allison moved to New York City, where she continued her writing career with a weekly column in AM New York, and published articles in magazines Seventeen and Cosmopolitan.

She became a television commentator, appearing regularly on CNN, MSNBC, Fox News, Fox Business, MTV, and E!. She has been credited with being the first commentator to explain the social media platform Twitter on MSNBC.

In 2007, Allison became a dating columnist for Time Out New York.

Her New York media fame led to profiles in the New York Times and a cover story in Wired magazine, both in 2008. She was also featured in a cover story in Time Out New York.

In 2010, she became a syndicated technology columnist for Tribune Media Services. In 2011, she joined Elle as a columnist. Her writing also appeared in New York Magazine, the New York Times, The Guardian, and Newsweek.

=== Fashion Reporting ===
Allison worked as an on-camera reporter covering New York Fashion Week for fourteen seasons for both NBC New York and Time Out New York, as well as other media outlets. Her coverage included behind-the-scenes segments and interviews with designers and celebrities, including conversations with designers such as Diane Von Furstenberg, Betsey Johnson, Christian Siriano, Viviane Tam and Jill Stuart, among others.

=== Business Ventures ===
In 2007, Allison founded NonSociety, an early social media talent agency that represented emerging online creators, including Jordan Reid (“Ramshackle Glam”). She also developed and pitched the concept of a collaborative living space for social media content producers, later referred to as a “collab house.” Bravo filmed a pilot based on the venture for a proposed reality television series titled IT Girls. During this period, Allison secured corporate endorsement deals with companies including Cisco, T-Mobile, and Sony, and appeared in a Sony advertising campaign alongside Justin Timberlake and Peyton Manning.

==== Speaking career ====
Allison has given keynotes at conferences like DLD Munich (The Guardian described her talk as "smart, tech-savvy and funny"), attended the annual World Economic Forum meeting and the White House Correspondents' Dinner. In 2010, she moved to Los Angeles, where she co-starred in Miss Advised, a documentary series about her writing a column for ELLE magazine, and living and dating in LA that ran for one season on Bravo.

==== Social Media ====
In 2005 she re-launched the blog she had begun in 2000, during her freshman year in college, where she posted details of her daily life and work. As one of Tumblr’s early adopters in 2007, Allison used the platform to merge confessional writing, visual aesthetics, and direct audience interaction, helping to shape the language of personal branding in the digital age.

In 2012, Allison withdrew from the public eye, deleting or making private most of her social media content. Although she maintains a social media presence, she has since used these platforms sparingly. As of the mid-2020s, she had several hundred thousand followers across major platforms, including Instagram and Facebook, but posts infrequently.

==== Media Strategy ====
In 2014, she moved to San Francisco and became a change activist & narrative strategist, founding a media strategy & communications firm called Reimagine Media, advocating for "environmentally & socially responsible entrepreneurs and businesses." According to the public website for Reimagine Media, its "mission is to support those who are doing good in the world by spreading their message to a larger audience." Her clients included Stanford professor Andrew Huberman, with whom she worked between 2016 and 2017 developing his public media presence, entrepreneur Brit Morin, the communal living organization Treehouse, and Apollo Neuroscience, founded by psychiatrist and neuroscientist Dr. Dave Rabin and entrepreneur Kathryn Fantauzzi. Allison closed the firm in 2023 in order to pursue graduate studies at Harvard.

==== Harvard University ====
As of 2025, Allison received a master's degree from the Kennedy School of Government at Harvard University.

In 2025, she was appointed as a Shorenstein Fellow at Harvard University's Shorenstein Center on Media, Politics and Public Policy. Her research "explores the intersection of social and legacy media, with a focus on technology, culture, social impact & innovation."

=== Performance Art and Dance ===
Allison’s work has frequently incorporated elements of performance art, both in digital and physical spaces. In the early years of social media, she used participatory and performative online practices as a form of self-authored media, including a series of highly produced “lip dub” videos staged in public settings. One such performance, filmed in Times Square, was featured in her 2008 Wired cover story and has since been cited as an early example of performative social media content that anticipated later trends in short-form video and lip-syncing platforms.

In the mid-2010s, Allison expanded into immersive and embodied performance art. In 2014, she staged a self-wedding ceremony at the Burning Man festival as a participatory feminist performance exploring autonomy, public identity, and cultural expectations surrounding marriage and womanhood. Her performance work often engages themes of visibility, ritual, and the relationship between personal narrative and collective meaning.

Allison has also incorporated dance into her performance practice, performing on stage at large-scale cultural and music events including Envision Festival, Lighting in a Bottle, Burning Man, and Red Rocks Amphitheatre.

== Personal life ==
Allison dated Congressman Harold Ford Jr. while she was a student at Georgetown University. In 2010-2011, she was romantically linked to Navy helicopter pilot Jack McCain, the son of U.S. Senator John McCain. She lived in New York City throughout her twenties, California during her thirties, and relocated to Cambridge, Massachusetts in 2021.

In 2020, Allison began dating Noah Feldman, a Professor of Law at Harvard University. The couple was engaged in 2023, and married on June 15, 2025, at Harvard University’s Widener Library.
