= Andrew Silow-Carroll =

American journalist

Andrew Silow-Carroll is an American journalist. In 2019, he resigned as editor of the Jewish Telegraphic Agency (JTA) to become editor of The Jewish Week.

== Career ==
Silow-Carroll has served as managing editor of The Forward, editor of the Washington Jewish Week and senior editor of Moment. He was a reporter for JTA from 1987 to 1990. He was CEO and editor in chief of the New Jersey Jewish News for 13 years. At the New York Jewish Week, Silow-Carroll replaces Gary Rosenblatt, who is retiring.

== Personal life ==
Silow-Carroll was born and raised in North Bellmore, New York. He lives in Teaneck, New Jersey, with his wife, Sharon. The couple have three children.
