= Miss Advised =

Television series

- Julia Allison, Emily Morse, and Amy Laurent (from left)
- Genre: Reality
- Starring: Amy Laurent; Emily Morse; Julia Allison
- Country of origin: United States
- No. of seasons: 1
- No. of episodes: 8

Production
- Executive producers: Ashley Tisdale; Brad Bishop; Jessica Rhoades; Michaline Babich; Tom Forman
- Running time: 44 minutes
- Production companies: Blondie Girl Productions; RelativityREAL

Original release
- Network: Bravo
- Release: June 18 – August 6, 2012

Miss Advised is an American reality television series that debuted on June 18, 2012, on Bravo in the United States. The series follows three single relationship experts – Emily Morse, Amy Laurent, and Julia Allison – as they provide dating advice but struggle to make their own love lives work.

== Episodes ==
No.	Title	Original release date	U.S. viewers (millions)
1	"Old Flames and New Beginnings"	June 18, 2012	0.56
2	"Breaking All the Rules"	June 25, 2012	0.60
3	"What's Your Type?"	July 2, 2012	0.44
4	"Kissing, Drinking and Dancing"	July 9, 2012	0.59
5	"True Colors"	July 16, 2012	0.61
6	"Eat, Pray, Fight"	July 23, 2012	0.70
7	"The One?"	July 30, 2012	0.50
8	"True Love, True Life"	August 6, 2012	0.60
