= David Twersky (journalist) =

David Twersky in an undated photo

David Twersky (Hebrew: דוד טוורסקי; February 19, 1950 – July 16, 2010) was a journalist, Zionist activist, and peace advocate in Israel and the United States. He was an editor for The Jewish Daily Forward and The New York Sun and a leader of the American Jewish Congress.

== Biography ==
David Twersky was born and raised in the Bronx, New York, where he grew up in the left-leaning Sholem Aleichem cooperative housing project. He attended Ramaz School in Manhattan and was active in the Labor Zionist youth movement Habonim. He attended City College of New York. In 1974, Twersky made aliyah (emigrated to Israel) and helped to re-establish Kibbutz Gezer. Twersky died of cancer on July 16, 2010, at the age of 60 in his home in West Orange, New Jersey.

== Journalism career ==
In Israel, Twersky worked for the Labor Party's international affairs department, where he dealt with the Socialist International. He edited Shdemot, the literary journal of the kibbutz movement, and Spectrum, an English-language political monthly. Twersky served in an artillery unit during the 1982 Lebanon War.

Twersky returned to the U.S. in 1986 and became a full-time journalist. When the Yiddish Forverts started an English-language edition in 1990, he became deputy editor and Washington bureau chief. During his seven years at The Forward, Twersky was responsible for breaking many news stories. One of his best-known stories involved President Bill Clinton's associate Johnnetta B. Cole, who had been suggested as a possible nominee for Secretary of Education, and the fact that she had served on the national committee of the Venceremos Brigade. Another of Twersky's stories brought to light some views of Lani Guinier, a law professor whom Clinton had nominated to be Assistant Attorney General for Civil Rights; those opinions were considered controversial and her nomination was withdrawn.

After leaving The Forward, Twersky became editor of the New Jersey Jewish News. Later he joined The New York Sun as foreign editor and columnist. Twersky also worked as director of international affairs for the American Jewish Congress.

Following his death, colleague Amir Cohen, who had worked with Twersky at both The Forward and the New Jersey Jewish News, established the David Twersky Journalism Award in his memory. The award was initially presented to journalists at those two publications, recognizing work focused on Israel and Jewish political affairs. Twersky's children, Anna and Michael, served on the judges committee alongside Cohen. The first award was presented in 2012 to Andrew Silow-Carroll, Twersky's successor as editor of the New Jersey Jewish News. Subsequent recipients have included Larry Cohler-Esses and Jane Eisner of the Forward, Johanna Ginsberg of the New Jersey Jewish News, JJ Goldberg, Adam Langer, Danielle Berrin of the Los Angeles Jewish Journal, and David Abitbol of Jewlicious — the last two recipients representing an expansion of the award beyond its original two publications.
