= Atlanta Jewish Times =

Weekly newspaper in Atlanta, Georgia, United States

- Type: Weekly newspaper
- Owner: Michael A. Morris
- Publisher: Michael A. Morris
- Editor: Kaylene Ladinsky
- Founded: 1925
- Headquarters: Atlanta, Georgia
- Circulation: 15,000
- Website: atlantajewishtimes.com

The Atlanta Jewish Times (AJT) is a weekly community newspaper serving the Jewish community of Atlanta, Georgia, United States. Its owner and publisher is Michael Morris.

== History ==
The newspaper began publishing as the Southern Israelite in 1925. In the 1980s, it was purchased by Charles "Chuck" Buerger, the owner of the Baltimore Jewish Times. Buerger died in 1996, and the paper was taken over by his son, Andrew.

In 2000, Andrew Buerger sold the paper, along with The Detroit Jewish News, to Jewish Renaissance Media (JRM), which also operated the website Jewish.com.

In 2005, it claimed a readership of 25,000. As of 2007, Arthur M. Horwitz of Jewish Renaissance Media was the publisher and Michael Jacobs the Managing Editor. When Jacobs left the paper in 2008, Ann Marie Quill was then promoted to managing editor.

On April 14, 2009, Andrew B. Adler (Metro Jewish News) acquired The Atlanta Jewish Times, with a staff of five and a subscribership of only 3,500. After his takeover the website jtonline.us ceased to be updated.

In late October 2009, The Atlanta Jewish Times moved to a new office, though still in the Dunwoody area. As of the end of that month, the paper's staff had expanded to 10, with new employees taken on for sports coverage and advertising coordination.

In January 2012 Adler wrote a column stating that one option for Israel to defend itself against Iran would be to have U.S.-based Mossad agents "take out" an "unfriendly" president. Mainstream Jewish organizations denounced the column, which was read as referring to an assassination of Barack Obama. Adler subsequently apologized and resigned as editor, and announced he was looking for a buyer for the publication.

In 2012 the paper was purchased by Cliff Weiss and the office was moved to Sandy Springs.

Michael Morris purchased the paper from Weiss in December 2014 and re-hired Michael Jacobs as Editor.

In June 2018, Kaylene Ladinsky took over as Editor and Managing Publisher. The newspaper currently prints 15,000 copies per week and distributes them at more than 320 locations across Metro Atlanta.

== See also ==
- List of Jewish newspapers in the United States
