= Phillip Ritzenberg =

American journalist (1931–2022)

- Born: June 22, 1931; Cleveland, Ohio, U.S.
- Died: May 26, 2022 (aged 90)
- Education: Case Western Reserve University; Humboldt University of Berlin
- Occupation: Journalist
- Spouse: Edith "Edna" Ritzenberg
- Children: 2

Phillip Ritzenberg (June 22, 1931 – May 26, 2022) was an American journalist. He was known for his work on the newspaper New York Daily News and The Jewish Week.

Born in Cleveland, Ohio, the son of Gertrude and Jack Ritzenberg, Ritzenberg attended Case Western Reserve University, where he graduated in 1953. He then attended the Humboldt University of Berlin on a Fulbright scholarship. Ritzenberg served as a United States Navy officer on the aircraft carrier USS Midway (CV-41). He was also a reserve officer at Floyd Bennett Field in Brooklyn. Ritzenberg worked at his father's printing shop.

Ritzenberg worked as a journalist and assistant managing editor for the New York Daily News. He left in 1982 to work as a journalist for The Jewish Week. In 1992, Ritzenberg announced that he would leave his post as publisher and editor of Jewish Week in early 1993. He was a founder of the Society for News Design, and was honored with the society's Lifetime Achievement Award in 2008.

Ritzenberg died of cancer in May 2022, at the age of 90. He was cremated.
