= Journalism Center on Children & Families =

US research center

The Journalism Center on Children & Families is a nonprofit program of the Philip Merrill College of Journalism at the University of Maryland, College Park. The center inspires and recognizes exemplary reporting on children and families. Since 1993, over 14,000 journalists have attended its intensive training programs and relied on it for balanced information and resources.

The Journalism Center has received funding from the Annie E. Casey Foundation, McCormick Foundation, Ms. Foundation for Women, Challenge Fund for Journalism, Freddie Mac Foundation and individual donors.

== Resources ==
The Journalism Center offers the training, resources and story ideas needed to cover the challenges today's children and families.

- Awards: Casey Medals for Meritorious Journalism honor distinguished coverage of U.S. children and families. First-place winners in 12 categories receive a $1,000 prize.
- Fellowships: Fellowships give journalists the opportunity to participate in discussions with renowned experts and build their skills in journalism workshops. Past conferences have covered children's health, crime and working families.
- News Summary: A roundup of the top child/family stories e-mailed every day or weekly.
- Website: The center's website is journalists' first stop for sources and story ideas.
- Source Assistance: The center offers online and personal help for journalists looking for the best sources on child/family topics.
- J-Community: Journalists exchange ideas about stories, sources and reporting issues in this private forum.

== The Casey Medals for Meritorious Journalism ==
The Casey Medals for Meritorious Journalism honor distinguished coverage of disadvantaged children and families. First-place winners in 12 categories receive $1,000 and are honored in an awards ceremony in Washington, D.C. Runners-up and honorable mentions are recognized with certificates of merit. Categories include newspapers, magazines, television, radio, online and photojournalism. More than 5,000 journalists have applied for Casey Medals since 1994.

Eligible work must be published or broadcast between January 1 and December 31 of the previous year. Awards are funded by the Annie E. Casey Foundation.

== Advisory board ==
- Patty Fisher, editorial writer, the San Jose Mercury News
- Peggy Girshman, executive editor, Kaiser Health News
- David Lawrence Jr., president, Early Childhood Initiative Foundation
- Albert Oetgen, managing editor, NBC News Washington
- David Park, Senior Vice President of Communications and Marketing, America’s Promise Alliance
- Laura Sessions Stepp, senior media fellow, National Campaign to Prevent Teen and Unplanned Pregnancy
- Ruth Teichroeb, former investigative reporter specializing, the Seattle Post-Intelligencer (now defunct)
- Judy Woodruff, senior correspondent, "The NewsHour with Jim Lehrer"
