= New York Jewish Week =

Weekly Jewish community newspaper in New York City

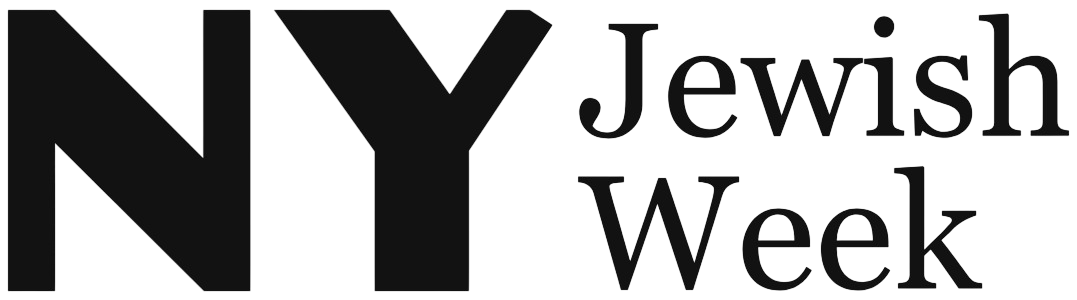

- Front page
- Type: News and opinion website
- Format: All-Digital
- Owner: 70 Faces Media
- Editor: Andrew Silow-Carroll
- Headquarters: New York City, New York, U.S.
- Circulation: 155,000
- Website: jta.org/newyork

New York Jewish Week (formerly The Jewish Week) is a weekly independent community newspaper targeted towards the Jewish community of the metropolitan New York City area.

== History ==
In March 2016, The Jewish Week announced its partnership with the online newspaper The Times of Israel. Later in 2016, The Jewish Week acquired the New Jersey Jewish News, which had been published by the Jewish Federation of Greater MetroWest New Jersey and had a circulation of 32,000. In July 2020, The Jewish Week suspended publication of its weekly print publication, and in January 2021 was acquired by 70 Faces Media, publisher of the Jewish Telegraphic Agency and other Jewish brands.

Each year The Jewish Week published "36 Under 36", honoring younger New Yorkers making a difference in Jewish philanthropy, education, the arts, religion and social action. Beginning in 2022, the list was published as "36 to Watch", without an age limit for awardees.

== Editorial staff ==
Phillip Ritzenberg was publisher and editor until 1993. Gary Rosenblatt was the editor and publisher from 1993 to 2019. Andrew Silow-Carroll took over in September 2019. Rosenblatt served as editor at large and continued to write for the paper and be involved in several of its educational projects.

== Awards ==
The Jewish Week won two first-place awards from the American Jewish Press Association in 2021.

In 2016, The Jewish Week became a finalist for awards in two categories by the Deadline Club, the New York City chapter of the Society of Professional Journalists, for its series on the battle to improve secular education in chasidic schools. The series was done in partnership with WNYC.

In 2000, Rosenblatt and the newspaper won the Casey Medal for Meritorious Journalism from the Journalism Center on Children & Families for the story "Stolen Innocence", an investigative report that uncovered allegations of decades of child abuse by a youth movement leader and high school principal, Baruch Lanner. The story was criticized by some in the Orthodox community for being "malicious gossip". Lanner and other officials of the Orthodox Group were forced to resign. Lanner was convicted of child sexual abuse in 2002.

== See also ==
- Institute for Nonprofit News (member)
