= The Jewish News (Detroit) =

American weekly community newspaper

The Detroit Jewish News
- Type: Weekly newspaper
- Owner: The Detroit Jewish News
- Editor: Jackie Headapohl
- City: Metro Detroit, Michigan
- Country: United States
- Circulation: 7,814 (as of 2022)
- Website: thejewishnews.com

The Detroit Jewish News is a weekly newspaper serving the Jewish community of Metro Detroit and Michigan. The non-profit Detroit Jewish News publishes the newspaper. The publication's headquarters are in Farmington Hills, Michigan.

== History ==
The mission of the Detroit Jewish News is to “be of service to the Jewish Community. The Detroit Jewish News will inform and educate the Jewish and general community to preserve, protect and sustain the Jewish people of greater Detroit and beyond, and the State of Israel.”

The vision of the Detroit Jewish News is to “operate to appeal to the broadest segments of the greater Detroit Jewish Community, reflecting the diverse views and interests of the Jewish Community while advancing the morale and spirit of the community and advocating Jewish unity, identity and continuity.”

The English-language Detroit Jewish News was founded in 1942 by publisher and editor Philip Slomovitz, who would later be called the “Dean of English Language Jewish Newspapers.” In 1951, the Detroit Jewish News absorbed an older newspaper, the Detroit Jewish Chronicle, which began publishing in 1916.

In 1984, the Detroit Jewish News was purchased by Charles "Chuck" Buerger, the owner of the Baltimore Jewish Times. Buerger expanded the scope and the size of the paper; issues regularly exceeded 200 pages. Buerger died in 1996, and the paper was taken over by his son, Andrew. In 2000, Andrew Buerger sold the Detroit Jewish News, along with The Atlanta Jewish Times, to Jewish Renaissance Media,

In 2005, the newspaper claimed an "adult readership of more than 40,000 every week". That year, the Detroit Jewish News was named Newspaper of the Year by the Michigan Press Association, which also gave it first place awards for Design, Editorial Writing, Local Columnist and Special Section, and a second place for Feature Story. Every year since, the Detroit Jewish News editors, reporters and designers have continued to win various awards from the Detroit Chapter of the Society of Professional Journalists and the American Jewish Press Association.

In 2020 the newspaper became a nonprofit news organization, published by the 501(c) (3) Detroit Jewish News Foundation.

Detroit Jewish News Publishers

- Philip Slomovitz, 1942–1984
- Arthur M. Horwitz, 1986-2020 (named Publisher Emeritus, 2020)
- Jewish News Foundation, 2020 -

Detroit Jewish News Editors

- Philip Slomovitz, 1942–1984, named Editor Emeritus,1984
- Gary Rosenblatt, 1984–1990; Corporate Editor, 1990–1993
- Phil Jacobs, Managing Editor, 1993–1997
- Alan Hitsky, Interim Editor, 1997
- Robert Sklar, Editor, 1998–2011
- Arthur M. Horwitz, Executive Editor, 2011–2020
- Andrew Lapin, Editor, 2021–2022
- Bryan Gottlieb, Editor, Read Thread Magazine, 2009–2011
- Jackie Headapohl – Managing Editor 2011–2022; Director of Editorial, 2022 -

== The Detroit Jewish News F0undation ==
The Detroit Jewish News Foundation was established in 2011 to digitize all historic issues of the Detroit Jewish News. Its educational, cultural and scholarly mission focuses on illuminating the ongoing story of the Detroit-area Jewish community and its families.

The William Davidson Digital Archive of Jewish Detroit History, established with a generous donation from the William Davidson Foundation, opened in November 2013 with the entire contents of The Detroit Jewish News. In October 2015, the entire content of the Detroit Jewish Chronicle (1916–1951) was added. Collectively, the two Detroit English-language Jewish newspapers represent over 100 consecutive years of community and family history.

Housed and managed by the Bentley Historical Library of the University of Michigan, the archive provides more than 345,000 pages in an open source, word searchable, downloadable database available at no cost.

The Detroit Jewish News Foundation was dissolved when the Detroit Jewish News became a non-profit in 2020.

== Notes ==
1. "2022-2023 Michigan Press Association Member Directory". Michigan Press Association. 2022-02-01. Retrieved 2023-04-22. 2. "Contact Us." (Archive) The Detroit Jewish News. "Detroit Jewish News 29200 Northwestern Hwy., Suite 110, Southfield, MI 48034" 3. About Us, The Detroit Jewish News website), 11/24/2024. 4. Ockerbloom, John Mark. "The Detroit Jewish Chronicle". University of Pennsylvania Library. 5. David, Michael. Publisher of 6 Jewish weeklies, Charles Buerger, dies at 58, J. The Jewish News of Northern California, November 15, 1996. 6. Jewish Times owner sells two newspapers, Baltimore Business Journal, February 11, 2000. 7. Display & Classified Advertising, Detroit JN online (The Detroit Jewish News website), 10/18/2005. Retrieved July 12, 2006. 8. 2005 "Newspaper of the Year" awards (PDF), Michigan Press Association, October 2, 2005. 9. Cramer, Philissa (18 September 2020). "At a time when many Jewish newspapers are struggling, Detroit's to seek sustainability by going nonprofit". Jewish Telegraphic Agency. Archived from the original on 22 September 2020. Retrieved 22 December 2020. 10. "Our Story - The Detroit Jewish News Foundation". Retrieved July 5, 2020.
