= New Jersey Jewish News =

Weekly newspaper in the US

The New Jersey Jewish News
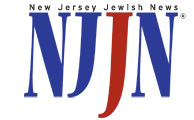
- Type: Weekly newspaper
- Owner: JJMedia, LLC
- Editor: Joanne Palmer
- Founded: 1946
- Headquarters: PO Box 2128; Teaneck, New Jersey 07666, U.S.
- Circulation: 24,000 (as of 2014)
- Website: njjewishnews.timesofisrael.com
- Free online archives: Archives at the Jewish Historical Society of New Jersey

The New Jersey Jewish News (NJJN) is a weekly newspaper.

== Coverage and scope ==
In addition to other issues, it covers local, national, and world events; Jewish culture and the arts; and Jewish holidays, celebrations, and other topics of interest. It is among the largest Jewish newspapers in the United States, and the largest-circulated weekly newspaper in New Jersey. NJJN previously published five editions, reaching 24,000 households.

== History ==
The newspaper was founded in 1946 as The Jewish News. Merging in 1947 with the Jewish Times of Newark, it kept the Jewish News name. In 1988, it was renamed the MetroWest Jewish News. In 1997, under the direction of Associate Publisher Amir Cohen, Editor David Twersky and Managing Editor Debra Rubin, it acquired The Jewish Horizon of Union and Somerset counties, changed its name to the New Jersey Jewish News, and focused on Jewish issues in New Jersey. In 1998, the newspaper acquired the Jewish Reporter.

In 2016, The Jewish Week acquired the New Jersey Jewish News from the Jewish Federation of Greater MetroWest NJ.

In 2020, the newspaper ceased publication after 74 years due to financial trouble. The decision to shutter the paper was announced to readers in late July. In September 2020, the newspaper resumed publication, with JJMedia, LLC, as publisher.

== See also ==
- Times of Israel
