= List of Yiddish newspapers and periodicals =

The following is a list of Yiddish-language newspapers and periodicals.

== Current newspapers ==
=== Russia ===
- Birobidzhaner Shtern

=== United States ===
- Der Blatt
- Der Yid
- Di Tzeitung

== Current periodicals ==
=== United States ===
New York

- Yugntruf
- Maalos
- Kindline
- Moment Magazine (est. 2014)

Others

- Shpaktiv
- Gigulim
- Di Naye Gvardie
- Dos Yidishe Kol
- Yungvarg

== Former newspapers ==
=== Belarus ===
Gomel

- Der yidisher komunist (1919)

Grodno

- Grodner Sztyme (c. 1920–1939)

Minsk

- Oktyabr (1918–1941)

Vitebsk

- Der royter shtern (1920–1923)

=== Belgium ===
- Unzer Wort (1941–1942)
- Unzer Kamf (1941–1942)

=== Canada ===
- Di hamiltoner yidishe shtime (1933–1943)
- Der Keneder Adler (1907–1977)

=== France ===
Paris

- Unser Stimme
- Naye Prese (1934–1993)
- Unzer Wort (–1996), the last worldwide daily Yiddish-language newspaper

=== Hungary ===
Sziget

- Yidishe Folkstsaytung (1893–1913)

=== Lithuania ===
Kaunas

- Arbeter Tsajtung

Vilnius

- Folks-shtime
- Der proletarisher gedank (1906–1907)
- Der yidisher arbeyter
- Flugblat (1915–1916)
- Di royte fon (1920)

=== Poland ===
- Arbeiterstimme (1897–1905, 1917 – c. 1939)
- Di royte fon (1906)

Łódź

- Lodzsher Togblat (1908–1936)
- Lodzer veker
- Folks Sztyme (1939)
- Folks-Sztyme (1946 – c. 1950)

Warsaw

- Dos jidysze arbeterwort (1906–1907)
- Haynt (1906–1939)
- Folkstsaytung (1921–1939)
- Folks-Sztyme (c. 1950–1991)

Włocławek

- Wloclawker Weker (c. 1920–1939)

=== Romania ===
Iasi

- Korot Haitim (1855–), the first-ever Yiddish-language newspaper
- Der Wecker (1896)

=== Russia ===
- Eynikayt (before 1945–?) (JAC)

Moscow

- Der Emes (1918–1939)

Saint Petersburg

- Jidishes Folksblat (1881–1889)
- Der Fraind (1903)
- Di Tsayt (1913–1914)
- Dos vort (1914)
- Di varhayt (1918)

=== South Africa ===
- Afrikaner Yidishe Tsaytung

=== Ukraine ===
Kharkiv

- Der Shtern (1925–1941)

Kiev

- Folks-shtime
- Naye tsayt (1917–1919)
- Komunistishe fon (1919–1924)

Odesa

- Komunistishe shtime (1919–1921)
- Unzer Lebn (before 1908–)

Stalindorf

- Stalindorfer emes (1930s)

=== United Kingdom ===
Liverpool

- Dos Fraye Vort (1898)

London

- Arbeter Fraynd (1885–1914)
- Der Poylisher Yidl (1884), later Di Tsukunft (Die Zukunft) (1892)
- Die Zeit (1910–1951)
- Teglicher Ekspress (1905, mocking the Daily Express)

=== Argentina ===
Buenos Aires

- Der royter shtern (1923–1934)
- Unser Gedank

=== Mexico ===
- Idish Lebn
- Radikaler Arbeter Tzenter
- Unzer Lebn

=== United States ===
New York

- The Tageblatt (1885-1928)
- Freie Arbeiter Stimme (1890–1977)
- Dos Abend Blatt (1894–1902)
- Di Arbeter Tsaytung (1894–1902)
- Morgn Zshurnal (1901–1971)
- Yidisher Tagblat (before 1903–1928)
- Di Varhayt (1905–1919)
- Der Tog (1914–1971)
- Di Tsayt (1920–1922)
- Morgen Freiheit (1922–1988)
- Der Algemeiner Journal (1972–2008)
- Yiddish Moment (2010–????)

== Former journals ==
=== France ===
Paris

- Der yidisher arbeyter (1911–1914)

=== Lithuania ===
Vilnius

- Der arbeyter (1902–1905)
- Forverts (1906–1907)

=== Netherlands ===
Amsterdam

- Die Kuranten (1686–1688)

=== Poland ===
- Arbeiter Fragen

Warsaw

- Der arbeyter (1905)

=== Romania ===
Iasi

- Likht (1913–1914)

=== United Kingdom ===
London

- Der arbeyter (1898–1901)
- Germinal (1900–1903, 1905–1908)
- Di proletarishe velt (1902–)

=== Ukraine ===
Odessa

- Kol Mevasser (1862–1872)

=== Israel ===
- Lebns Fragn (1951–2014)
- Israel Shtime (1956–1997)
- Die Woch (1959–)
- Dos Yiddishe Licht, replaced with Beleichtungen

=== Canada ===
- Keneder Adler (1907–1977)

=== Czechoslovakia ===
- Munkatsher Humorist

== Literary journals ==
=== United Kingdom ===
Oxford

- Yidish Pen (s. 1994)

=== Poland ===
Warsaw

- Forojs

=== Romania ===
Bucharest

- Die wokh (c. 1935)
- Shoybn (c. 1935)

=== Russia ===
Moscow

- Heymland (before 1948–c. 1961)
- Sovetish Heymland (c. 1961 – before 1993)
- Di yidishe gas (s. 1993)

=== Israel ===
- Naye vegn (after 1991)

Tel Aviv

- Di goldene keyt (1948–?)
- ToplPunkt

=== Argentina ===
Buenos Aires

- Dorem Amerike (1926–1927)
- Naivelt (1927–1930)

=== United States ===
New York

- Yidishe Kultur (1938–2006)
- Oyfn Shvel (Afn Shvel) (1957–)

=== Sweden ===
- Yidishland (2019–)

== Web ==
- Archive of Jewish Periodicals (German)
- Alphabetic list of Yiddish newspapers at the National Library of Russia

== See also ==
- List of Jewish newspapers
- List of Judaeo-Spanish language newspapers and periodicals
