= List of Jewish newspapers =

A Jewish newspaper is a newspaper which focuses on topics of special interest to Jews, although Jewish newspapers also include articles on topics of a more general interest as well. Political orientations and religious orientations cover a wide range.

This list includes dailies, weeklies, and papers of other frequencies. It includes newspapers in Hebrew, Yiddish, and a variety of other languages. It includes defunct as well as active publications.

Shalom Magazine, quarterly Jewish publication in English, in print and online distributed free of charge in Massachusetts and Rhode Island. Independent and supported by advertisers. Includes local news and opinion articles since April 2009. Journalist Shirley Nigri Farber is the published and editor. Available online at www.ShalomMA.com.

Newspapers
Name	Language(s)	Translated name	Current country	Region	Years active	Circulation	Frequency	More info
Afrikaner Yidishe Tsaytung	Yiddish	The African Jewish Newspaper	South Africa	Johannesburg	1931-1985	3000	weekly	founded by Ben-Zion Alumni, expanded by Boris Gersman, continued by Levi Shalit
Der Beobachter an der Weichsel	Polish, German	The Vistula Observer	Poland	Warsaw	1823–1824	150	Weekly	The first ever Jewish newspaper
The Jewish Word	Polish, Yiddish		Poland	Warsaw	1992–Present		Periodical	Primary Polish Jewish publication
Folks-Sztyme	Polish, Yiddish		Poland		1946–1991		Daily	
Australian Jewish News	English		Australia				Weekly	See Australian Jewish Media
Calgary Jewish News	English		Canada		1962–88			
Canadian Jewish News	English		Canada					
The Jewish Post & News	English		Canada	Winnipeg				
The Jewish Star (Alberta)	English		Canada	Alberta	1980–90			
The Jewish Tribune (Canada)	English		Canada		1964–2015			
The Jewish Independent	English		Canada	Vancouver				
Israel's Messenger	English		China	Shanghai	1904–41			
Shanghai Jewish Chronicle	German		China	Shanghai	1939–48			Renamed to Shanghai Echo in 1945
Jüdische Zeitung	German		Germany		2005–2014			
Еврейская газета	Russian	Jewish newspaper	Germany		2002–			Еврейская газета, Published by Jüdische Zeitung
Jewish Voice From Germany	English		Germany					German
Jüdische Allgemeine	German	Jewish general	Germany		1946–Present			Jüdische Allgemeine
Jüdische Rundschau	German		Germany		1902–38			See: Jüdische Welt-Rundschau
Yidishe heftn	Yiddish	Yiddish notebook	France	Paris	1996–?			http://yiddish-sources.com/yidishe-heftn-les-cahiers-yiddish
Revista Cultului Mozaic din R.P.R.	Romanian, Yiddish, Hebrew, English		Romania	Bucharest	1956–1995			
Realitatea Evreiască	Romanian, Yiddish, Hebrew, English		Romania	Bucharest	1995–Present			Renamed from Revista Cultului Mozaic din R.P.R.
Új Kelet	Hungarian	New East	Romania	Transylvania	1918–1940			Moved to Tel Aviv, Israel
Szombat	Hungarian	Saturday	Hungary		1989–Present			https://www.szombat.org/about
Új Élet	Hungarian	New Life	Hungary		1945–Present			Neolog paper, maintained by Mazsihisz since 1990.
Remeny	Hungarian	Hope	Hungary		2002–15			http://www.remeny.org/
Kibic Magazin	Hungarian	Kibitzer	Hungary		2013–Present			http://akibic.hu/
Múlt és Jövő	Hungarian	Past and Future	Hungary		1911–1944; 1988–Present			http://www.multesjovo.hu/en/?___from_store=hu
Sófár Újság	Hungarian	Shofar newspaper	Hungary		1998?-Present			unrelated to Shofar (journal)
Új Kelet	Hungarian	New East	Hungary		1948–Present			
Gut Sábesz	Hungarian	Good Shabbat	Hungary		2002/3-Present			Costs 300 Ft, and Chabad Paper
Egység	Hungarian	Unity	Hungary				Monthly	Costs 300 Ft, and Chabad Paper
Birobidzhaner Shtern	Yiddish, Russian		Russia	Birobidzhan, Jewish Autonomous Oblast	1930–44			
Ha-Melitz	Hebrew		Russia	Saint Petersburg	1860–1904			
Şalom	Turkish, Ladino	Peace/Hello	Turkey		1947–Present			
El Amaneser	Ladino	The Dawn	Turkey	Istanbul	2003–Present	6000	Monthly	Currently the only full Ladino newspaper in the world
Aki Yerushalayim	Ladino	Jerusalem Here!	Israel	Jerusalem, Israel	1979–2016			
Dos Yiddishe Licht/ Beleichtungen	Yiddish/English	The Jewish Light	Israel	Jerusalem, Israel	1950–Present		Weekly	Started in 1923 in New York
Kol Mevasser	Yiddish		Russia (in 2019, Ukraine)	Odessa	1862–72			Supplemented Ha-Melitz
The Jewish Chronicle	English		United Kingdom		1841–Present			Longest running Jewish paper
The Jewish Echo	English		United Kingdom	Glasgow	1928–1992		Weekly	
Jewish Telegraph	English		United Kingdom		1950–Present			
Jewish Tribune (UK)	English, Yiddish		United Kingdom		1962–Present			Only current paper in UK with Yiddish
Jewish News	English		United Kingdom		1997–Present			
The Jewish World (London)	English		United Kingdom	London	1873–1934			
The Jewish Voice	English		United States	New York	2003–Present			Original name The Jewish Voice Media Group
The Jewish World	English		United States	Capital District, New York	1965–Present			Also published as Schenectady Jewish World and Albany Jewish World
Der Blatt	Yiddish		United States	New York	2000–Present		Weekly	
Kindline (magazine)	Yiddish		United States	New York	2014–Present			
Five Towns Jewish Times	English		United States	5 Towns, New York	2000–Present	20,000	Weekly	
Hatsofe B'Erez Hachadosho	Hebrew		United States		1871–76			First Hebrew periodical in US
The Hebrew Standard	English		United States		NYC	late 1800s-early 20th century		
Jewish Post of New York	English		United States	New York	1974–Present	21,000		
New Jersey Jewish News	English		United States	New Jersey	1946–2020	24,000	Weekly	
The Jewish Week	English		United States	New York	1875–Present	55,000	Weekly	UJA funded
Yated Ne'eman	English		United States	Monsey, New York	1987–Present	20,000	Weekly	
Der Yid	Yiddish		United States		1953–Present	25,000	Weekly	
Westchester Jewish Life	English		United States	Westchester, New York				
The Long Island Jewish World	English		United States	Long Island, New York	1976	16,000	Weekly	
The Manhattan Jewish Sentinel	English		United States					
Jewish Insider	English		United States	Washington, D.C.	2015–Present	unknown	Daily (email newsletter), web updates	Covers U.S. politics, business, philanthropy, and Middle East affairs. Known for its "Daily Kickoff" newsletter.
The Rockland & Westchester Jewish Tribune	English		United States					
The Israelite (1854–1874); The American Israelite (1874–present)	English		United States	Cincinnati	1854–Present	6,500	Weekly	Second longest running paper
The Atlanta Jewish Times	English		United States	Atlanta, Georgia	1925–Present	6,500	Weekly	
JTNews	English		United States	Seattle, Washington	1924–2015		Biweekly	
Mishpacha (News magazine)	English, Hebrew		United States		1984–Present	50,000	Weekly	
Washington Jewish Week	English		United States	Washington D.C.	1930–Present	10,000		
Wisconsin Jewish Chronicle	English		United States	Milwaukee, Wisconsin	1921–Present	3,000	Weekly	
Texas Jewish Post	English		United States	Texas	1947–Present	4,000		
The St. Louis Jewish Light	English		United States	St. Louis, Missouri	1947–Present	10,000	Weekly	
Philadelphia Jewish Voice	English		United States	Philadelphia, Pennsylvania	2005–2019		Weekly	
Baltimore Jewish Times	English		United States	Baltimore, Maryland	1919–Present			
Chicago Jewish Star	English		United States	Chicago, Illinois	1991–2018	17,500	Twice-monthly	
Chicago Jewish News	English		United States	Chicago, Illinois	1994–2019	10,000		
Cleveland Jewish News	English		United States	Cleveland, Ohio	1964–Present	12,000	Weekly	
The Detroit Jewish News	English		United States	Detroit, Michigan	1942–Present	17,000	Weekly	
Jewish Telegraphic Agency	English		United States		1917–Present			
The Jewish Press	English		United States	Brooklyn, New York	1960–Present	50,000	Weekly	
The Jewish Observer (Los Angeles)	English		United States	Los Angeles, California	1999–Present			
Jewish Herald-Voice	English		United States	Houston, Texas	1908–Present	7,000	Weekly	Longest running paper in South US
Jewish News of Greater Phoenix	English		United States	Phoenix, Arizona	1948–Present	6,000	Weekly	
Jewish Ledger	English		United States	Connecticut	1929–Present	15,000	Weekly	
The Jewish Journal of Greater Los Angeles	English		United States	Los Angeles, California	1985–Present	50,000	Weekly	
The Jewish Journal (Boston North)	English		United States	Boston, Massachusetts	1976–Present	17,000	Bi-weekly	
Federation Star	English		United States	Naples, Florida	Greater Naples, Florida	3,000	Monthly	
Florida Jewish News	English		United States	South Florida	2005–2007			
Florida Jewish Journal	English		United States	Fort Lauderdale, Florida		125,000	Weekly	
The Jewish News of Sarasota-Manatee	English		United States	Sarasota, Florida		13,000	Monthly	
L'Chayim, Florida	English		United States	Fort Myers, Florida	1989-Present		Monthly	http://ufdc.ufl.edu/AA00032761/00073/citation
Pittsburgh Jewish Chronicle	English		United States	Pittsburgh, Pennsylvania	1962–Present	8,500	Weekly	
The Jewish Exponent	English		United States	Philadelphia, Pennsylvania	1887–Present	24,000	Weekly	
The Jewish Advocate (Boston)	English		United States	Boston, Massachusetts	1902–Present	40,000	Weekly	
Intermountain Jewish News	English		United States	Denver-Boulder, Colorado	1913–Present	30,000	Weekly	
J. The Jewish News of Northern California	English		United States	San Francisco, California	1895–Present	17,000	Weekly print edition, daily online edition	
Algemeiner Journal	Yiddish, English		United States	Brooklyn, New York	1972–Present	23,000	Weekly	
The American Jewish World	English		United States	Minneapolis and Saint Paul, Minnesota	1912–Present	4,000	Monthly	http://ajwnews.com/about/
Buffalo Jewish Review	English		United States	Buffalo, New York		3,500	Weekly	
The Forward/Forverts	English, Yiddish		United States	Lower East Side, New York City. Moved to Brooklyn in late 20th century.	1897–Present	English: 28,000	English: weekly. Yiddish: biweekly	
Charlotte Jewish News	English		United States	Charlotte, North Carolina		4,000	Monthly	
Hamodia	English, Hebrew, French		United States	Brooklyn, New York	1950–Present		Weekdays	
Jewish Review	English		United States	Portland, Oregon	1959–2012		Twice-monthly	
Jewish Standard	English		United States	Teaneck, New Jersey	1931–Present	24,000	Weekly	oldest Jewish weekly in New Jersey
The Jewish Star (New York)	English, Hebrew column		United States	Garden City, New York	2002–Present		Weekly	
The New Standard (newspaper)	English		United States	Columbus, Ohio			Semi-monthly	
Westchester Jewish Life	English		United States	Westchester County, New York	1995?-Present	24,000	Monthly	
Belaaz News	English	Online News Outlet	United States	Queens, New York	2012–Present	15,000	Weekly	
The Asmonean	English		United States					
Occident and American Jewish Advocate	English		United States					
Jewish South	English		United States					
Di Tzeitung	Yiddish	The Newspaper	United States	Brooklyn, New York	1988–Present		Weekly	
Dos Yiddishe Licht	Yiddish/English	The Jewish Light	United States	New York	1923–1927		Weekly	Revived in 1950 in Jerusalem
Maalos	Yiddish	Virtue/steps	United States	New York	1996–Present		Monthly	
Der Bay	Yiddish/English		United States	San Mateo, California	1991–2016		Monthly	
Flatbush Jewish Journal	English		United States	New York	2010–Present		Weekly	
Jewish Rhode Island	English		United States	Rhode Island	1929–present		Weekly	
The Iowa Jewish News	English		United States	Des Moines, Iowa	1932–1952	1,817	Weekly	
Magen David	Armenian, Hebrew, Russian		Armenia	Yerevan	2002–Present		Monthly	
