= Red star (disambiguation) =

A red star is an important ideological and religious symbol.

Red Star may also refer to:

== Astronomy ==
- Red dwarf, a small and relatively cool star
- Red giant, a large, cool non-main sequence star

== Books ==
- Krasnaya Zvezda, or Red Star, a Soviet and Russian military newspaper
- Red Star (publication), a 1970–1971 series of American communist publications
- Red Star (novel), a 1908 novel by Alexander Bogdanov
- The Red Star, a comic book series by Christian Gossett
  - The Red Star (video game), a video game based on that graphic novel
- Red Star (comics), a character in the DC universe
- Red Star (G.I. Joe), a character in the G.I. Joe universe
- Red Star, a fictional planet in the Dragonriders of Pern universe
- Red Star, a planet-like star in the Bionicle line of toys

== Brands ==
- Beijing Hongxing, or Beijing Red Star, a Chinese baijiu distillery
- Red Star, an unrecognized humanitarian protection emblem proposed by Zimbabwe
- Red Star Line, a former passenger ocean line between Antwerp and New York City
- Redstar Morning Glory, the plant Ipomoea coccinea
- Red Star Parcels, a former parcels service in the UK
- Red Star poultry, another name for the Red Sex Link breed of poultry
- Red Star Yeast, a brand of yeast produced in Milwaukee, Wisconsin
- Red Star OS, a North Korean Linux distribution

== Music ==
- Red Star (Noah Howard album), a 1977 album by Noah Howard
- Red Star (Showaddywaddy album), a 1977 album by Showaddywaddy
- Red Star (EP), an EP by Third Eye Blind
- Bravado Cartel, formerly RedStar, an English rock band
- "Red Stars", a song by the Birthday Massacre from Walking with Strangers

== Places ==
- Red Star, Alberta, Canada
- Red Star, Kentucky, US
- Red Star, a station on the Pyongyang Metro, North Korea

== Sport ==
- SD Crvena Zvezda (Sport Society Red Star) (Serbian: Sportsko društvo Crvena Zvezda), a sports association in Belgrade, Serbia
  - Red Star Belgrade (Serbian: Crvena Zvezda Beograd), a football club which is a member of this association
- Red Star F.C., a football club in Paris, France
- Red Star FC (Seychelles), a football club in Anse-aux-Pins, Seychelles
- FC Red Star Zürich, a football club in Zürich, Switzerland
- Seaham Red Star F.C., a football club in Seaham, England
- Rudá Hvězda Brno, a football club from Brno, Czech Republic
- Rudá Hvězda Znojmo, former name of a football club 1. SC Znojmo from Czech Republic
- Rudá Hvězda Cheb, a former name of a football club FK Hvězda Cheb from Czech Republic
- Rudá Hvězda Bratislavax, a former name of the football club FK Inter Bratislava from Slovakia
- FK Crvena Zvezda Gnjilane, a former name of a football club KF Drita from Gnjilane, Kosovo
- Cherveno Zname, a former name of the football club PFC CSKA Sofia from Bulgaria
- Estrella Roja FC, a football club from Caracas, Venezuela
- Estrela Vermelha do Huambo, a football club from Huambo, Angola
- Estrela Vermelha (Beira), a football club from Beira, Mozambique
- Russian Red Stars or MHL Red Stars, an ice hockey team formed with players of the Russian Junior Hockey League
- Chicago Stars FC, a soccer club in Chicago, United States formerly known as Chicago Red Stars
- HC Kunlun Red Star, an ice hockey club in Beijing, China

== Other ==
- Red Star (UK), a revolutionary socialist organisation in Britain
- Der royter shtern (disambiguation) ('The Red Star'), a name used by different Yiddish publications
- Red Star, a fictional country in the Wars series of video games

== See also ==
- Star Red, a Japanese manga series
- Krasnaya Zvezda (disambiguation)
- Communist Party of India (Marxist–Leninist) Red Star
- Red triangle
