= Di royte fon =

Di royte fon ("The Red Banner") may refer to:

- Di royte fon (1906), a newspaper published in Congress Poland in 1906
- Di royte fon (1920), a newspaper published in Vilna, Lithuania in 1920

== See also ==
- Red Banner
