= Der royter shtern =

Der royter shtern ("The red star") may refer to:

- Der royter shtern (Buenos Aires), a newspaper published between 1923 and 1934
- Der royter shtern (Lvov), a newspaper published in 1941
- Der royter shtern (Vitebsk), a newspaper published between 1920 and 1923

== See also ==
- Red star (disambiguation)
