= Jewish press =

Jewish press may refer to:

- The Jewish Press
- Jewish newspapers in general
- Antisemitic canard than Jews control the press coverage in general
