= NDPR =

NDPR can stand for:

- Notre Dame Philosophical Reviews, Academic book review journal published by University of Notre Dame
- Prairie Public, a public radio and television broadcaster in North Dakota
- National Sovereignty Party of Russia, a Russian nationalist party
