= Jewish Community of Armenia =

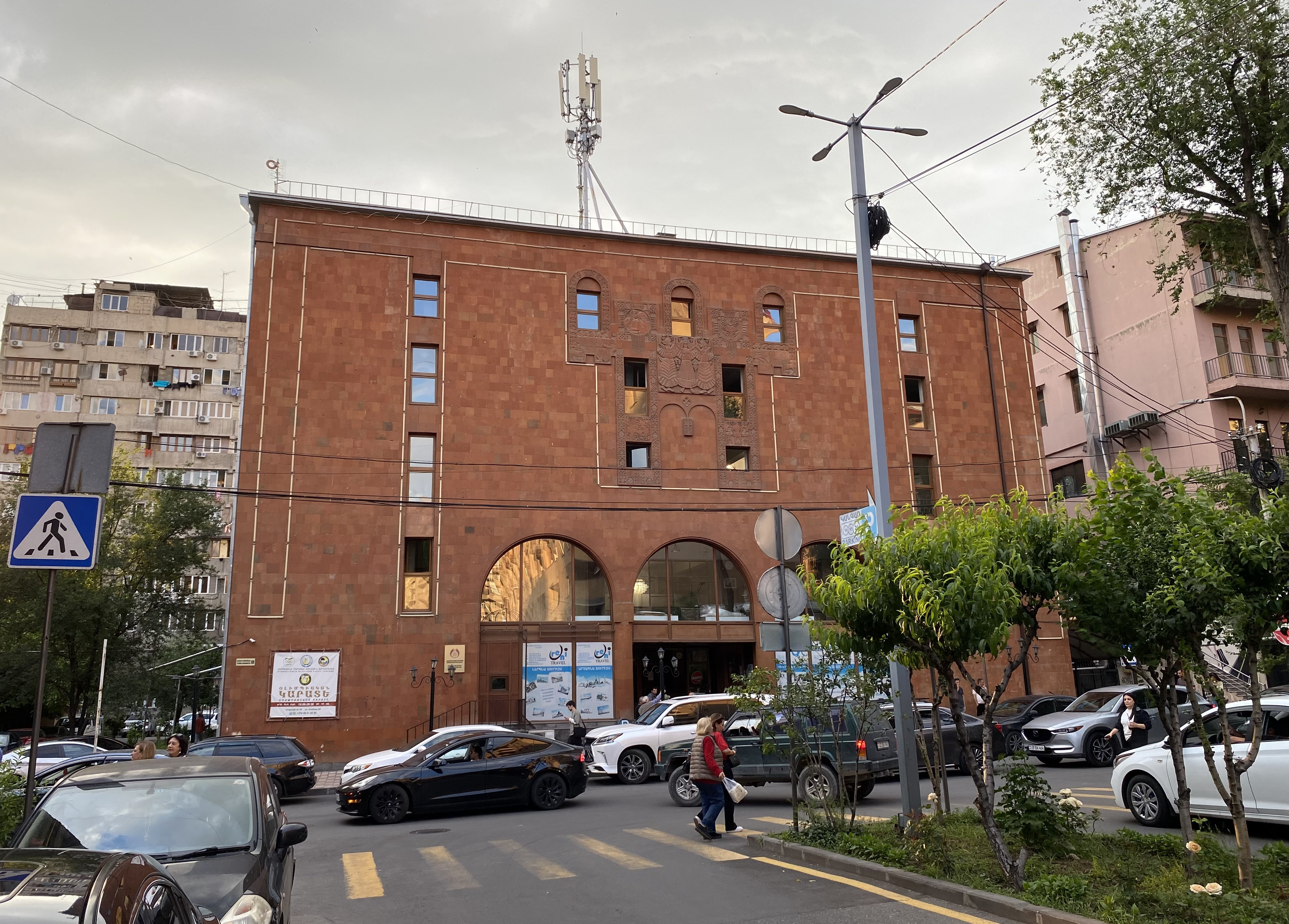
Building hosting the JCA office in Yerevan

The Jewish Community of Armenia (Armenian: Հայաստանի հրեական համայնք) is Armenia's oldest and largest Jewish non-governmental organization. It serves as a community center for Jewish holidays and cultural events and owns Armenia's only Jewish newspaper, Magen David.

== History ==
The Jewish Community of Armenia was founded in 1991 by a group of activists including Gershon Burstein and William Weiner. Since 1996, it has been headed by Rima Varzhapetyan-Feller. It is affiliated with the World Jewish Congress and the Euro-Asian Jewish Congress and represents the communal interests of Armenia's Jewish citizens and residents in the Council for National Minorities.

In the 2000s, the community installed a monument commemorating the victims of both the Holocaust and the Armenian genocide in Yerevan.

Armenia's only medieval Jewish cemetery in Yeghegis, previously abandoned for centuries, was cleaned up by the community and has since then become a tourist destination.

== Publications ==
The Jewish Community of Armenia owns and operates the only Jewish newspaper in Armenia, Magen David. It is published monthly and contains articles in three languages: Russian, Armenian and Hebrew. Paper copies are distributed free of charge at the community's Yerevan office, and online copies can be accessed on the organization's website.

Members of the community have also coauthored and published several multilingual books on the history of Armenian Jewry, including Jews in Armenia: The Middle Ages (2009) and The Jews of Noah's Land (2020).

== See also ==
- History of the Jews in Armenia
- Israelis in Armenia
- Armenia–Israel relations
