= Red triangle (disambiguation) =

A red triangle is used as a symbol with several meanings.

Red triangle or Red Triangle may also refer to:

- Red Triangle (Pacific Ocean), the colloquial name of a region off the coast of northern California, US
- Red triangle slug, a species of land slug from Australia
- Red Triangle, the parent company of the Alvis Car and Engineering Company
- Red Triangle (factory), in St. Petersburg, Russia

== See also ==
- Red Triangle Gang, a fictional entity in the film Batman Returns
- Pyramid Head, or Red Pyramid Thing, a fictional character from the Silent Hill horror video game series
