= Salomon Korn =

German architect

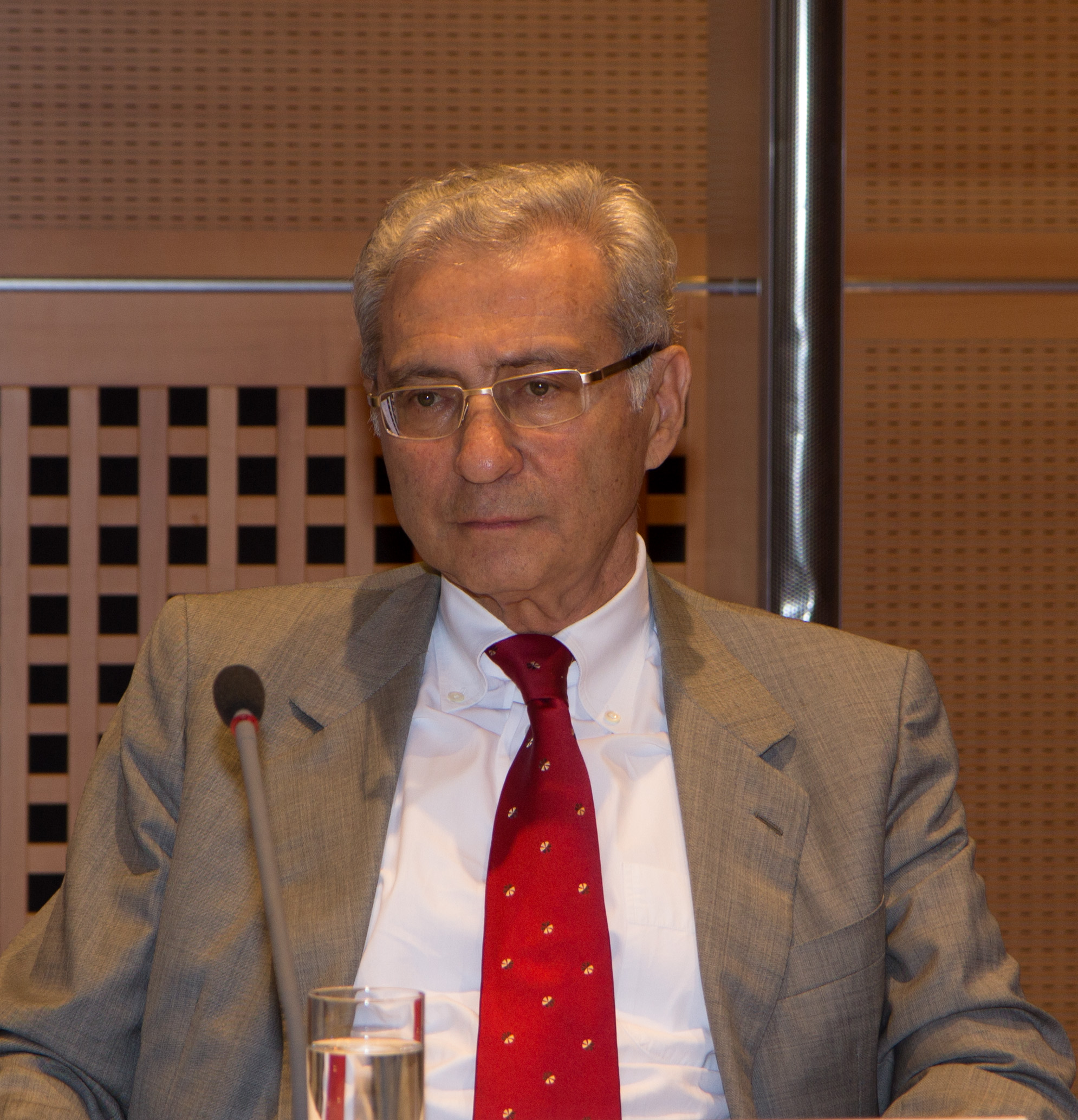
Korn in 2018

Salomon Korn (born 4 June 1943 in Lublin, Poland) is a German architect and an honorary senator of Heidelberg University. Since 1999 he has served as chairman of the Jewish Community of Frankfurt am Main and since 2003 as vice president of the Central Council of Jews in Germany.

== Life ==
Salomon Korn's grandfather was a rabbi in Lublin, Poland. He was born as the eldest of three brothers in the Lublin ghetto. After the fall of the Nazi regime, he and his parents were transferred to a camp for displaced persons in Frankfurt-Zeilsheim. The family had planned to emigrate to the USA or to Israel, but moved emigration over and over again. Korn visited the Helmholtz School during this time. His father successfully established a real estate business. In 1964 he married Maruscha Rawicki. The couple has three children. Korn studied architecture and sociology in Berlin and Darmstadt. In 1976, he achieved a PhD with a study of the reform of the prison system. His brother Benjamin Korn (born 1946) became a theatre director.

Korn became the architect of the Jewish Community Center in Frankfurt am Main that opened in 1986. On that occasion, he stated: "Someone who builds a house, wants to remain — and hopes for security." A week after the opening ceremony, he was elected to the board of the Jewish Community of Frankfurt. In 1999 he became the chairman.

Korn serves in several foundations and cultural and scientific institutions, such as the Ludwig Börne Foundation and the Foundation for the Promotion of the Scientific Relations of Johann Wolfgang Goethe University in Frankfurt. He is member of the board of trustees of the Ignatz Bubis Award for Mutual Understanding, of the foundation Monument to the Murdered Jews of Europe, and of the Senate of the Deutsche Nationalstiftung; he is also a Board Member of Aktion Sühnezeichen Friedensdienste. He serves in honorary functions for the Opera in the Abbey ruins of Bad Hersfeld, the German Film Institut and the Sigmund Freud Institute, both in Frankfurt/Main. He is a member of the advisory council of the American Jewish Committee in Berlin, of the Kuratoriums of the Leo Baeck Instituts and of the Federal Foundation Jüdisches Museum Berlin. He also serves in several scientific committees.

In 2003 he was elected vice president of the Central Council of Jews in Germany. He has repeatedly declined to be a candidate for the presidency of this institution.

In May 2006, the State of Hesse awarded him the title of Professor in recognition of his contributions to the field of "remembrance". Since October 2006, he has been an honorary senator of Heidelberg University, and from 2008 to 2017 he was a member of the University Council of Heidelberg University.

He published works on social science and architectural history. In the 1990s, Korn made critical contributions to the debate about a central Holocaust memorial. In 2014, he took a stand in the controversy about the Stolpersteine by Cologne artist Gunter Demnig, favoring their collocations also in Munich.

== Quotation ==
Between 1900 and 1933, synagogues in Germany began to become a part of the respective urban landscape — in spite of previous controversies, especially in large cities. With the destruction of more than 1,400 Jewish god houses during and after the Reichskristallnacht in 1938 — including the Semper Synagogue in Dresden — this prodigious development ended abruptly, and a German architectural category disappeared almost entirely from the consciousness of the Germans

— Korn, FAZ, 27 October 2008

== Accolades ==
- 2005 Cicero-Rednerpreis for extraordinary rhetoric performances in the category of politics
- 2006 Honorary title Professor of the State of Hesse for his merits on the subject of remembrance
- 2006 Honorary Senator of the Ruprecht-Karls-Universität Heidelberg
- 2009 Hessian Cultural Prize

== Publications ==
- Salomon Korn, Micha Brumlik: Europa und der Judenmord. 2005, ISBN 3-86572-500-7.
- Salomon Korn: Die fragile Grundlage. Auf der Suche nach der deutsch-jüdischen Normalität. 2003, ISBN 3-82570-340-1.
- Salomon Korn: Geteilte Erinnerung. Beiträge zur deutsch-jüdischen Gegenwart. 2001, ISBN 3-86572-205-9.
- Helga Krohn, Matthias Morgenstern, Salomon Korn: Ostend. Blick in ein jüdisches Viertel. 2000, ISBN 3-7973-0742-X.

Articles

- Moschee auf der Alm: Zu schwach, um Fremdes zu ertragen?, in: FAZ, 27 October 2008 (about the construction of synagogues and mosques in Germany)
- München soll stolpern, Die Zeit (Hamburg), 15 November 2014 (about the Stolperstein controversy in Munich)

Interviews

- Evelyn Finger: Diktaturenvergleich jetzt!, in: Die Zeit (Hamburg), 15 November 2007
- Stefan Reinecke and Christian Semler: Wir brauchen keine Opferkonkurrenz – Die Tageszeitung (Berlin), 6 May 2004
- Peter Voß: „Normalität lässt sich nicht herbeireden“ – SWR-Kulturzeit, November 2004.
- Alexander Wendt: Ein Unbehagen des Westens – focus, 18 September 2006
- Moritz Reininghaus: Ein Anfang scheint gemacht – Jüdische Zeitung, November 2008
