= FJJ =

FJJ can refer to:

- Flatbush Jewish Journal, an Orthodox Jewish weekly newspaper based in Brooklyn, New York, U.S.
- Fondation Jean-Jaurès, a French socialist think tank
- FJJ, a British military squadron that was part of the No. 28 Elementary Flying Training School RAF, by squadron code; see List of RAF squadron codes

== See also ==
- Frans Julius Johan van Eysinga (1818–1901) or F. J. J. van Eysinga, a Dutch politician
