= Moment Magazine (Yiddish) =

Weekly Yiddish-language magazine based in New York

Moment
- Native name: מאָמענט
- Editor: Shmuel Herman
- Categories: Yiddish-language magazine
- Frequency: Weekly
- Format: Print
- Total circulation: c. 25,000 (2024)
- Founder: Yoel Krausz
- First issue: 2014; 12 years ago
- Country: United States
- Based in: New York
- Language: Yiddish
- Website: momentmagazine.org

Moment (Yiddish: מאָמענט) is a Yiddish-language weekly printed magazine serving Orthodox Jewish communities, primarily in the New York metropolitan area and other regions with significant Yiddish-speaking populations. Established in 2014, it is regarded as the largest Yiddish weekly magazine in the United States, with reported circulation of about 25,000 copies and an estimated weekly readership exceeding 150,000, as of 2024.

== History ==
The magazine was co-founded by Yoel Krausz, a member of the Satmar Hasidic community, with the aim of producing a publication that would appeal to a broad Orthodox Yiddish-speaking audience rather than to one particular Hasidic group. Its content is overseen by a rabbinic review board and avoids coverage of topics considered inappropriate for its readership, such as certain crime or scandal stories.

From its inception, Moment has operated with a print-first approach, reflecting the limited internet use within many Haredi communities. The publication has built a wide distribution network that reaches readers across the United States and internationally.

== Content and readership ==
Moment publishes community news, interviews, features, cultural essays, and serialized works. Special supplements are occasionally issued, such as thematic editions covering topics of Jewish life in the former Soviet Union and the activities of the Chabad-Lubavitch movement in Russia. These supplements have been noted in Orthodox Jewish community media for their depth and presentation.

== Distribution ==
While based in New York, Moment is distributed in Orthodox neighborhoods across the United States, including communities in New Jersey, upstate New York, and Florida. Internationally, the magazine reaches readers in London, Antwerp, and Israel.

== See also ==
- List of Yiddish newspapers and periodicals
