= Chicago Jewish News =

American Jewish newspaper (1994–2019)

- Type: Weekly newspaper
- Founder: Joseph Aaron
- Editor-in-chief: Joseph Aaron
- Founded: 1994
- Ceased publication: 2019
- Headquarters: Skokie, Chicago, Illinois
- Circulation: 10,000
- Website: chijewishnews.com (Archives of homepage at the Wayback Machine (archive index). Additional archives: List of webpages archived in the Wayback Machine.) Formerly available at chicagojewishnews.com (Archives of homepage at the Wayback Machine (archive index). Additional archives: List of webpages archived in the Wayback Machine, Deprecated link.)

Chicago Jewish News was a newspaper mainly serving the Jewish population in Chicago. The newspaper won two Simon Rockower Awards in 2015, where it is categorized as a newspaper with a circulation of less than 15,000 copies. At its peak the newspaper had a readership of over 40,000.

== History ==
The Chicago Jewish News was founded by Joseph Aaron in 1994. He served as the paper's editor-in-chief and wrote a weekly column for the publication. The paper ceased after Aaron died of a heart attack outside a restaurant in Jerusalem on November 16, 2019. He was 64.

== See also ==
- List of Jewish newspapers in the United States
