= Benjamin Korn =

German theatre director and essayist (1946)

Benjamin Korn (born 1946 in Lublin) is a German theatre director and essayist.

== Life ==
Korn, the son of devout Polish Jews, studied sociology in Frankfurt am Main at the Institute for Social Research. In 1975, he became an assistant director to Michael Gruner in Frankfurt and Wiesbaden. From 1976, he worked independently as a director and achieved early success in 1978 with a production of Stella.

Following this, Jürgen Bosse brought him to the Nationaltheater Mannheim, where he directed Clavigo in 1979. His 1980 production of Maria Magdalena in Wiesbaden also received attention. In 1980/81, Peter Striebeck invited him to the Thalia Theater in Hamburg, where he staged Fegefeuer in Ingolstadt (1980), Nathan the Wise (1981), and Leonce and Lena (1982).

He went on to direct The Dispute at the Cologne Schauspielhaus (1983), Woyzeck at the Munich Kammerspiele (1984), Miss Julie at the Schauspiel Frankfurt (1985), and Dom Juan (1985) at the same theatre. Further productions included Tartuffe at the Bavarian State Theatre (1987), Faith, Hope and Charity at the Schauspielhaus Bochum (1988), and Elle by Jean Genet (1991, German premiere) at the same venue. Other engagements took him to the Schauspielhaus Zürich and to Paris, where he has lived since 1982.

In 1999, Korn was considered as a candidate to succeed Holger Berg as director of drama at the Municipal Theatres of Nuremberg, although Klaus Kusenberg was ultimately appointed to the position.

For his essay collection Kunst, Macht und Moral ("Art, Power and Morality"), he received the Clemens Brentano Prize of the city of Heidelberg in 1998.

Korn has also published numerous essays in German newspapers such as Die Zeit, addressing topics including the remembrance of fascism, theatre scandals as political phenomena, and current political movements in France.

His elder brother, Salomon Korn, is chairman of the Jewish Community of Frankfurt and a former vice president of the Central Council of Jews in Germany.

== Publications ==
- Kunst, Macht und Moral. Suhrkamp, Frankfurt am Main, 1998, ISBN 3-518-39352-9. (Essays)
- Afterword in: Anatoli Kusnezow: Babi Yar – The Ravine of Suffering: A Documentary Novel. Berlin: Matthes & Seitz, 2001, ISBN 3-88221-295-0.
- Contribution in: Katja Behrens (ed.): Ich bin geblieben – warum? Juden in Deutschland – heute ("I Stayed – Why? Jews in Germany Today"). Bleicher, Gerlingen, 2002, ISBN 3-88350-055-0.
