= Jewish Standard =

Weekly newspaper in Bergen County and Northeastern New Jersey

- Type: Weekly newspaper
- Founded: 1931
- Headquarters: Teaneck, New Jersey
- ISSN: 0021-6747
- Website: jewishstandard.timesofisrael.com

The Jewish Standard is a newspaper based in Teaneck, New Jersey, USA, that primarily serves the Jewish community in Bergen County and Northeastern New Jersey. The Jewish Standard was founded in 1931, and is the oldest Jewish weekly in New Jersey. It has partnered with the online newspaper Times of Israel and is hosted by the latter's website platform.

Unaffiliated with any program, organization, or movement, it states it is dedicated to giving expression to all phases of Jewish life. The Jewish Standard is independently owned, and says it is committed to "Jewish continuity and to Israel and America's well-being that have made both countries blessed."

== Expansion ==
In 1984, the company took over publishing of the Jewish Community News, the Jewish newspaper of Passaic County. In 1991, the company began publishing the Rockland Jewish Reporter as the official publication of The Jewish Federation of Rockland County. In 2002, the company began publishing About Our Children, a source for information for Jewish families.

The papers have won numerous awards from the American Jewish Press Association, the North Jersey Press Club, the Society of Professional Journalists and from Parenting Publications of America.

== See also ==
- List of Jewish newspapers in the United States
- The Hebrew Standard
