= National Sovereignty Party of Russia =

National Sovereignty Party of Russia (Russian: Национально-державная партия России) is an unregistered Russian nationalist party established in 2002.

The declared ideology of the party is "Russian nationalism". Co-Chairmen of the party are Alexander Sevastyanov and Stanislav Terekhov.

It is affiliated with the Russian National Movement, and the Movement Against Illegal Immigration (DPNI), Russian National Union (RONS) and other nationalist organizations.

In 2003, the Ministry of Justice of the Russian Federation issued a formal warning to the party of the inadmissibility of the implementation of extremist activities. In May 2003 the NDPR was excluded from the unified state register of political parties as it failed to meet the legal requirement of fielding 45 registered regional offices (as the NDPR had only 40 at the time).

In 2002, the World Congress of Russian Jewry, published in the newspaper The Jewish Word, accused the party of "inciting hatred of the peoples living in Russia, primarily the Jews". In response, representatives of the party filed a lawsuit for libel and demanded to recover from Berel Lazar 1.3 million rubles In 2004 the court ordered Berel Lazar to apologize and pay damages of 100 rubles.

The organization was denied registration in 2012.
