= Arbeter Zeitung (Kaunas) =

- Type: weekly newspaper
- Editor-in-chief: Moshe Erem
- Founded: 1921
- Ceased publication: 1926
- Political alignment: Labour Zionism
- Language: Yiddish
- Headquarters: Kaunas

Arbeter Zeitung (Yiddish: אַרבעטער צײַטונג, 'Workers Newspaper') was a weekly newspaper published from Kaunas, Lithuania 1921–1922 and again in 1926. It was an organ of the Poalei Zion Smol. Moshe Erem served as the editor-in-chief of the newspaper. However, the 'official' editor of the newspaper was Tuvia Meshorer. Another key figure in the running of the newspaper was Leib Rabinowitz.

Politically, the editorial line of Arbeter Zeitung differed little from that of the Lithuanian Jewish communist movement. However, the newspaper had a different approach on the issue of Jewish national identity than the communists.

Forty issues of Arbeter Zeitung were published between April 1921 and May 1922, when the government launched a crack-down on the publication. Meshorer was sentenced to one year in jail. By 1926, the political tide in Lithuania had turned and Arbeter Zeitung was relaunched with Israel Nitzevitz as its editor. The newspaper was again banned in December 1926, as nationalists were now in control over the government.
