= The Jewish Journal (Boston North) =

Newspaper published in Essex County, Massachusetts, U.S.

The Jewish Journal Boston North
- Type: Biweekly newspaper
- Founded: 1976
- Language: English
- Headquarters: United States
- Circulation: 17,000

The Jewish Journal (The Jewish Journal of Greater Boston, formerly The Jewish Journal Boston North) is an independent, community-sponsored Jewish newspaper serving the Jewish community of Essex County, Massachusetts north of Boston, and published bi-weekly on Fridays since 1976.

A grant from the Jewish Federation of The North Shore allows it to be distributed free of charge to all Jewish residents in Beverly, Boxford, Byfield, Danvers, Essex, Georgetown, Gloucester, Hamilton, Ipswich, Lynn, Lynnfield, Manchester, Marblehead, Middleton, Nahant, Newbury, Newburyport, Peabody, Rockport, Rowley, Salem, Saugus, Swampscott, Topsfield, Wenham, and West Newbury. Jewish residents of Amesbury, Andover, Bradford, Groveland, Haverhill, Lawrence, Merrimac, Methuen, North Andover, and Salisbury must pay a subscription fee to receive the newspaper. The current Publisher is Barbara Schneider, and Bette Keva is the Editor.

== See also ==
- List of Jewish newspapers in the United States
