= Krasnaya Zvezda (disambiguation) =

Krasnaya Zvezda (Красная звезда; Russian for Red Star) is a Soviet and later Russian military newspaper.

Krasnaya Zvezda may also refer to:

- Krasnaya Zvezda State Enterprise, a Russian state enterprise that research and produce nuclear power systems for spacecraft
- Order of the Red Star, Soviet military decoration
- Red Star (novel), 1908 Russian sci-fi novel about a Martian communist society

== See also ==
- Red star (disambiguation)
