= Komunistishe shtime =

Yiddish newspaper from Odesa, Ukraine (1919–1921)

- Founded: 1919
- Ceased publication: 1921
- Political alignment: Jewish sections of the Odesa City Committee of the Communist Party of Ukraine
- Language: Yiddish
- Headquarters: Odesa
- Country: Soviet Union

Di komunistishe shtime ('The Communist Voice') was a Yiddish language newspaper published from Odesa between 1919 and 1921. Its frequency of publishing was irregular, alternating between daily and weekly. It was founded in early 1919 as the organ of the Odesa Committee of the Komfarband (Jewish Communist Union). Later it became the organ of the Jewish Section of the Odesa City Committee of the Communist Party (bolsheviks) of Ukraine. Published in the midst of the Russian Civil War, times of great scarcity of printing paper, Komunistishe shtime was printed on old postal paper.

During its initial phase Komunistishe shtime was edited by S. Epstein and A. Chemerinsky. Later the editing was managed by a collective team. As of 1921 it had a circulation of around 800. Komunistishe shtime was closed down in 1921. It was one of the publications that didn't survive the new policy imposed by the Sovnarkom in 1921 that newspapers had to be self-financing. 18 issues of Komunistishe shtime are kept at the National Library of Russia.

== See also ==
- List of Yiddish newspapers and periodicals#Ukraine
