= Charlotte Jewish News =

American Jewish magazine

- Cover of the August 2020 issue
- Type: Monthly magazine
- Owner: The Jewish Federation of Greater Charlotte
- Publisher: The Jewish Federation of Greater Charlotte
- Editor: Elizabeth Breyer Johnson
- Founded: January 1979
- Headquarters: Charlotte, North Carolina
- Circulation: 4,600 households (March 2022)
- OCLC number: 38071216
- Website: charlottejewishnews.org

The Charlotte Jewish News (the CJN) is a monthly (except July) Jewish magazine headquartered in Charlotte, North Carolina.

== Content, editor, and circulation ==
The Charlotte Jewish News reports on local and international Jewish news, events, rituals, and Jewish holidays. It has sections on art, sports, entertainment, health, business, finance, real estate, Jewish travel, as well as kosher recipes.

The circulation as of March 2022 was 4,600 households.

== History ==
The first issue of the Charlotte Jewish News was published in January 1979. That issue was sponsored by the Charlotte Jewish Federation, the Hebrew Academy, and the Jewish Community Center, and its editor was Ann Langman. Its co-Editor and co-founder was Rita Mond, who served as its full-time Editor for many years and subsequently as an advertising executive.

The editors through the years are as follows:

Editor	First Issue	Ref.
Ann Langman (with Rita Mond listed as co-editor)	Jan 1979	
Ann Langman and Rita Mond	Dec 1979	
Rita Mond	Jun/Jul 1984	
Harvey Cohen	Jun/Jul 1994	
Cynthia Chapman	Aug 1996	
Susan Kramer	May 1997	
Suzanne Cannon (interim editor)	Apr 1998	
Amy Krakovitz Montoni	Aug 1998	
Shira Firestone	Aug 2020	
(Vacant position, although JFGC Communications Specialist Jessica Goldfarb wrote a majority of the articles)	Sep 2025	
Elizabeth Breyer Johnson	December 2025	

== Ownership and management ==
The Charlotte Jewish News is affiliated with and published by the Jewish Federation of Greater Charlotte, and operates as a 501(c)(3) non-profit organization. It is overseen by a board of directors representing members of the Charlotte Jewish community. It is a member of the Jewish Press Association, and abides by its ethics.

The Foundation of Shalom Park, a non-profit agency, owns and manages the properties and facilities for the Charlotte Jewish News.
