= Yiddish Moment =

Defunct Yiddish newspaper (2010–?)

- Native name: דער ייִדיש מאָמענט
- Type: Yiddish-language monthly newspaper
- Format: Online
- Owner: Dr Oytser Namast
- Editor-in-chief: Jacob Kornfeld
- Founded: 2010
- Ceased publication: 2019
- Language: Yiddish
- City: New York
- Country: United States
- Website: yiddishmoment.com

Der Yiddish Moment (Yiddish: דער ייִדיש מאָמענט) was an online Yiddish-language newspaper established in 2010, and now defunct. It was updated regularly and covered many current and important issues. It was written by a group of intellectuals from eastern Europe who had survived World War II.

== Staff ==
- Editor in Chief - Jacob Kornfeld, deceased 2020
- Assist Editor Dr. Simcha Eckelstein
- Edit Secretary - Benjamin Eckelstein
- Founder/President - Dr Oytser Namast, Professor, Journalist, Doctor.
- Spec. Consultant and Chief Correspondent - Dr R. Fishbein, Doctor, Journalist, Author, news writer for der FORVERTS (1996-1998) under Dr. R. ben Pesach) and news-writer, columnist, assistant-editor at der Algemeiner Journal (1999-2002).
- Writer/Correspondent - Louis Gavortshik, deceased 2019

NB all staff listed are actually pseudonyms for Robert Kaufstein, who published under the name Rakhmiel Fishbein at the Algemeiner Journal and the Forverts.

== See also ==
- List of Yiddish newspapers and periodicals
