= Lodzsher Togblat =

Polish Yiddish newspaper

Lodzsher togblat or Lodzer togblat (Yiddish: לאדזשער טאָגבלאַט, "Łódź Daily", in Polish sources referred to as Łodzier Togbłat and sometimes erroneously as Lodzer Tageblatt) was the oldest Yiddish daily in Poland outside of Warsaw, published in Łódź during 1908–1936. It is not to be confused with German-language Lodzer Tageblatt printed by Leopold Zoner from 1881 to 1905.

The first Yiddish newspaper in Łódz, Lodzsher Togblat was established in 1908 by Emanuel Hamburski and Abram Tenenbaum. Its editor-in-chief was Isaiah Uger.

Initially it was published by the publishing house of Mendel Hamburski by ul. Ogrodowa, 3.

It was suspended during World War I by the occupying German powers for about a year.

In July 1931, a few weeks after the death of Emanuel Hamburski, the newspaper was in a hiatus but later resumed until 1936.
