= The Hebrew Standard =

Defunct NYC newspaper

The Hebrew Standard was an English language weekly newspaper published in New York City in the early 20th century. (and the late 19th century). Writers editorialized against intermarriage, and on questions of Jewish sabbath observance and Sunday blue laws.

The newspaper included pieces about celebrating days of importance on the Jewish calendar, and covered Jewish community news (locally, USA-wide, and beyond).

== See also ==
- The Jewish Daily Forward (in English)
- The Jewish Standard
