= The Jewish Post =

American newspaper

The Jewish Post (Vol.1, No. 1, March 1933, Indiana

The Jewish Post and Opinion cover (11 January 2017)

The Jewish Post is a set of Jewish publications with several U.S. state editions including Indiana, Kentucky, Chicago, Missouri and New York.

== Spinoffs ==
Later on the Indiana publication became known as The National Jewish Post starting August 2, 1944. It has the slogan "A Journal for Indiana Jewry".

The Jewish Post and Opinion is a monthly English Jewish publication, published in Indianapolis, Indiana. It is a continuation of The Jewish Post founded and funded by Gabriel Murrel Cohen, it is managed by Jennie Cohen, his daughter.

The Missouri Jewish Post edition ran from 1948 to 1992 before stopping publication.

The Jewish Post of New York traces its origins as an independent publication from 1974 to 1983 when the New York City edition became a separate publication from The Jewish Post and Opinion. It had a circulation of 21,000.
