= Gershon Burstein =

Rabbi

- גרשון מאיר בורשטיין

Personal life
- Born: Terevan, Armenia

Religious life
- Religion: Judaism
- Synagogue: 23 Nar-Dos Street, Yerevan

Gershon-Meir Burshtein (Modern Hebrew: גרשון מאיר בורשטיין) — is an Armenian Jew and chief Rabbi of Armenia.

== Biography ==
In 1991, he was among the initiative group that organized the Jewish religious community of Armenia.

In 1995, he returned to Armenia as the chief rabbi of Armenia, envoy of the Lubavitcher Rebbe and representative of the international charitable foundation "Or Avner". With sponsorship, he purchased a building for the Jewish Religious Community Center of Armenia “Mordechai Navi”, named in memory of the destroyed Yerevan synagogue.

In 2012, he called on Israel to recognize the Armenian genocide.
