= Jüdische Zeitung =

Monthly German-language Jewish newspaper

- Type: monthly newspaper
- Founder: Werner Media Group Berlin
- Founded: autumn 2005
- Language: German
- Ceased publication: 2014
- Country: Germany
- Website: j-zeit.de

The Jüdische Zeitung (English Jewish newspaper) was a monthly newspaper in German language, founded in autumn 2005 by two Jewish brothers from Moldova, Nicholas and David Werner. The paper received some criticism over its lack of Jewish staff members and journalists.

It ceased publication in 2014. The target audience of the monthly publication was the German-speaking Jewish community as well as all readers interested in topics of Judaism. The journal informed about relevant events from Europe, the US and especially from Israel. Upon its formation it joined the previously founded monthly newspaper Еврейская газета (English: Jewish newspaper) published in the Russian language in Germany also by the same publishing house, published since 2002.

== Topics ==
- current political, religious (not only Jewish), social, cultural and economic events in Germany
- world affairs and diaspora
- tradition and modernity
- Jewish community and contemporary Judaism
- inter-religious dialogue
- views and disputes about current questions of Judaism and many general social, relevant themes
- updated Jewish art and culture
- science and education in Jewish context
- history of Judaism

== See also ==
- Jewish newspaper
