= Red triangle =

Symbol

A red triangle (upright 🔺 or 🔻 inverted) or red wedge is used as a symbol with a variety of meanings, including:

== Red triangle ==
=== Societal symbols ===
- Red triangle (badge), anti-fascist symbol partly derived from a Nazi concentration camp badge worn by political prisoners
- Red triangle (Channel 4), British television content warning system symbol
- Red triangle (family planning), the symbol for family planning health and contraception services
- Red triangle (Palestinian symbol), a symbol used by al-Qassam (militant wing of Hamas) in Palestine and pro-Palestinian protesters worldwide
- Donald Trump 2020 presidential campaign § Red triangle – advertisements banned on Facebook for using a red triangle symbol (see also: Trump 2020 § Political positions)

=== Internet and communications ===
- Red triangle emoji (see also: list of emojis)

The dictionary definition of 🔻 U+1F53B at Wiktionary

- Unicode block: Miscellaneous Symbols and Pictographs

U+1F53A 🔺 "UP-POINTING RED TRIANGLE"

U+1F53B 🔻 "DOWN-POINTING RED TRIANGLE"

== Red wedge ==
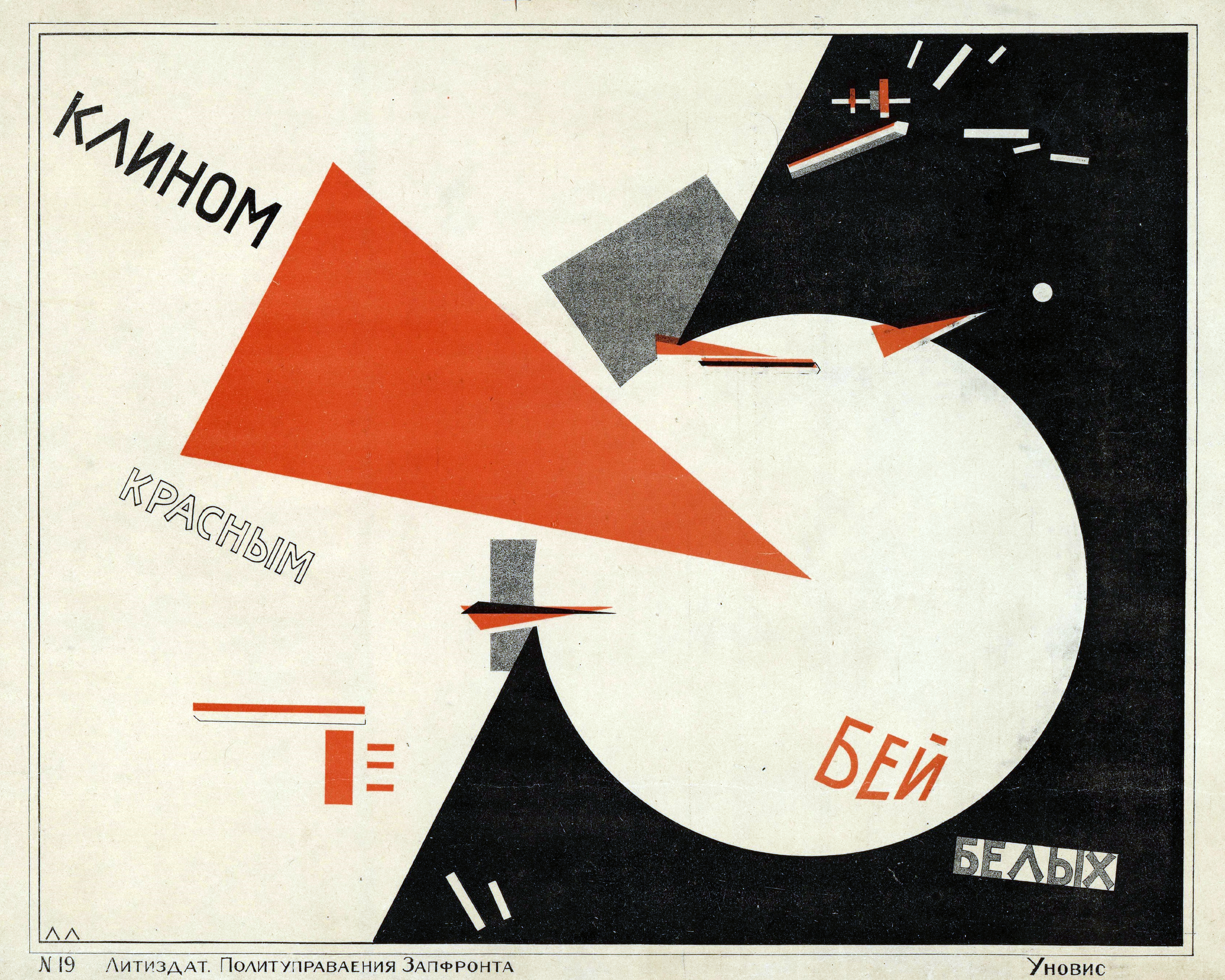
Beat the Whites with the Red Wedge

The red wedge from El Lissitzky's 1919 poster Beat the Whites with the Red Wedge has been used in many artworks and political symbols.

=== Other artworks and artists ===
- The Red Wedge – 1918 sculpture by Nikolai Kolli (an earlier artwork)
- Red Wedge – British left-wing musical collective of the 1980s

=== Red wedge symbols in logos and artworks ===
- Network of Communists – Italian political network, founded in 1998
- Former logo of Revolutionary Left (Spanish: Izquierda Revolucionaria)
- Searchlight (magazine) – British magazine
- Organisation of Communist Internationalists (Russian: Организация Коммунистов Интернационалистов)

== Upright red triangles ==
An upward-pointing red triangle has been used to represent:

=== Commercial logos ===
- Bass Brewery's "iconic red triangle" trademark, England's first registered trademark
- Delta Air Lines' logo

=== Military and maritime ===
- Republican Guard (Iraq) – Republican Guard Forces Command insignia
- Strafbataillon – Military penal unit of the Wehrmacht
- United States Coast and Geodetic Survey – Former U.S. government scientific agency

=== Geography ===
- A symbol on the Brazilian state flag of Minas Gerais

=== Politics ===
- 19th Century symbol for the eight-hour workday

Further: Red triangle (badge) § Eight-hour workday

- National Mobilization – Political party in Brazil

=== Other symbols ===
- The alchemical symbol for Fire (classical element)
- Warning triangle – Marker used to warn motorists about temporary road hazards

== Inverted red triangles ==
A downward-pointing red triangle has been used to represent:

=== Commercial logos ===
- BJ's Restaurants – American restaurant chain
- Canadian Tire – Canadian retail company
- Manifold System – Geographic information system software
- Alvis Car and Engineering Company

=== Logos of NGOs ===
- YMCA – Worldwide youth organization

=== Media ===
- Antifaschistisches Infoblatt – Antifascist magazine in Germany

=== Anti-fascism ===
- Association of Persecutees of the Nazi Regime – Federation of Antifascists – Political confederation in Germany (VVN-BdA)
- Associazione nazionale ex deportati nei campi nazisti
- Committee of Antifascist Resistance Fighters – Organization in East Germany, 1953–1990
- Liberté chérie – Masonic Lodge

=== Military ===
- 3rd (UK) Division – Armoured division of the British Army
- The Military Media (الإعلام العسكري) logo of the Qassam Brigades in Palestine

=== Awards and honours ===
- Auschwitz Cross (Polish WWII medal)
- Political Prisoner's Cross 1940–1945 (Belgian WWII medal)

== See also ==
=== Disambiguation ===
- Black triangle (disambiguation)
- Red star (disambiguation)
- White Terror (disambiguation)

=== Articles ===
- Brown triangle – used to mark victims of the Romani Holocaust
- Pink triangle – Symbol for the LGBTQIA+ community
- LGBTQ symbols § Triangle badges of Nazi Germany
- P (Nazi symbol) – Sign for Polish workers during the NS-Regime in Nazi Germany
- Purple triangle – Badge used in Nazi concentration camps to identify Jehovah's Witnesses
- Traffic warning sign – Sign that warns people for a risk or danger
