= Dorem Amerike =

Magazine

Dorem Amerike (Yiddish: דרום אַמעריקע, 'South America') was a Yiddish-language literary monthly magazine published in Argentina in 1926-1927. Politically, Dorem Amerike was pro-communist but without open affiliation to the Communist Party of Argentina.
