= Die Woch =

Yiddish-language newspaper in Tel Aviv, Israel

Die Woch (Yiddish: די וואָך, 'The Week') was a Yiddish-language weekly newspaper published in Tel Aviv.

The newspaper was founded on 29 March 1959 as a 12-page tabloid. Die Woch was an organ of Mapai. Y. Magen was the editor. The newspaper was sold for 200 Israeli pruta.
