= Moshe Erem =

Israeli politician (1896–1978)

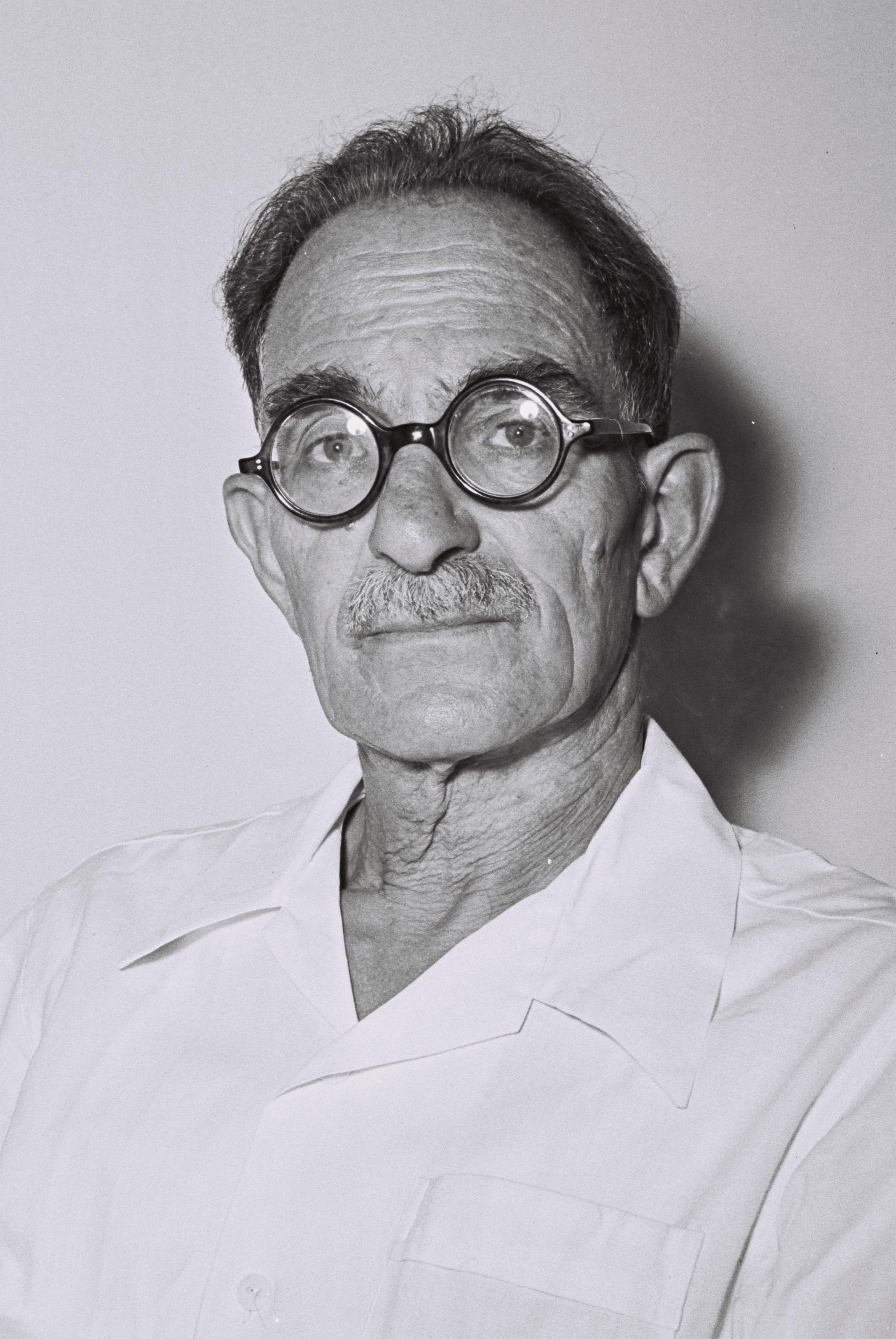
- Erem in 1955

Faction represented in the Knesset
- 1949–1954: Mapam
- 1954–1959: Ahdut HaAvoda
- 1965: Ahdut HaAvoda
- 1965–1968: Alignment
- 1968–1969: Labor Party
- 1969: Alignment

Personal details
- Born: 7 August 1896 Lyady, Russian Empire
- Died: 14 October 1978 (aged 82)

Moshe Erem (Hebrew: משה ארם; 7 August 1896 – 14 October 1978) was an Israeli politician who served as a member of the Knesset for several left-wing parties and factions from 1949 until 1959, and again from 1965 until 1969.

== Biography ==
Born Moshe Kazanovski in Lyady in the Mogilev Governorate of the Russian Empire (now in Belarus), Erem worked as a high school headteacher in Kaunas. He emigrated to Mandatory Palestine in 1924, and worked in building and road construction. He joined Poale Zion movement, later becoming one of its leading figures. In the same year that he immigrated he became a member of the Tel Aviv–Jaffa workers council that year, serving on it until 1935. In 1926, he was elected onto Tel Aviv's city council.

In 1935, he was sent to the United States as a Poale Zion emissary, working there for two years. In 1937, he was invited to Spain (during the civil war) by the republican government. He also served on the Zionist Executive Committee and the Histadrut's executive committee, and worked in the Organisation department of the Jewish Agency in the 1940s.

In the 1949 elections he was voted into the Knesset on the Mapam list. He retained his seat in the 1951 elections, but on 23 August 1954, left the party alongside Israel Bar-Yehuda, Yitzhak Ben-Aharon and Aharon Zisling to re-establish Ahdut HaAvoda - Poale Zion as an independent party. He was re-elected on the new party's list in the 1955 elections, but lost his seat in 1959. He failed to win a seat in the 1961 elections, but entered the Knesset on 4 May 1965 as a replacement for the deceased Bar-Yehuda. He retained his seat in the November 1965 elections, by which time Ahdut HaAvoda had entered an alliance with Mapai, known as the Alignment. Following a formal merger of the two (with the addition of Rafi), in 1968 this became the Labor Party, and, following the addition of Mapam to the alliance, was again renamed the Alignment in 1969. Erem lost his seat in the elections that year. He died in 1978.

A street in north Tel Aviv is named after him
