= The Jewish Post & News =

Canadian Jewish newspaper

- The Jewish Post and News (20 August 1987)
- Type: Weekly newspaper (1925-2007); Bi-weekly newspaper (from 2007)
- Owner(s): Gwen Secter Creative Living Centre
- Founder(s): Ben Cohen
- Founded: 1925 as The Jewish Post (1925-1986); The Jewish Post and News after merger with Western Jewish News (1986-present)
- Language: English
- City: Winnipeg, Manitoba
- Country: Canada
- Circulation: 1,500 (as of 2024)
- Website: jewishpostandnews.ca

The Jewish Post & News of Winnipeg, Manitoba, Canada, is Western Canada's first and oldest Anglo-Jewish newspaper, so described because its language was English rather than Yiddish though its concerns were those of the Canadian Jewish community particularly in Western Canada.

== The Jewish Post ==
The first issue of The Jewish Post, founded as an English-language weekly by Benjamin M. Cohen, appeared on Jan. 9, 1925. After going through a succession of owners it was purchased in 1984 by its then-editor, Matt Bellan, along with his brother Bernie Bellan, and the paper's then-advertising manager, Gail Frankel. In 1987, The Jewish Post purchased the rival Western Jewish News and the title after the merger of the two publications was changed to The Jewish Post & News.

In August 2007, the newspaper changed its publication schedule from weekly to bi-weekly. In 2008, Matt Bellan retired as editor of the paper. Bernie Bellan worked as both editor and publisher until retiring in 2024. He then donated the newspaper to the Gwen Secter Creative Living Centre.

== Rivalry with Dos Yiddishe Vort and The Western Jewish News ==
Less than two years after the launch of the Jewish Post came The Western Jewish News, founded in Winnipeg as an English-language weekly by Samuel A. Berg, a lawyer. Its first issue was dated Oct. 26, 1926. This led to heated Jewish newspaper wars in Winnipeg.

Preceding the two English-language papers was Dos Yiddishe Vort (The Yiddish Press, also known as The Israelite Press), a Yiddish-language mainly weekly publication which dated to 1910 as Der Kanader Yid (The Canadian Israelite). Frank Simkin claimed to be a co-founder of Der Kanader Yid. From 1938, Dos Yiddishe Vort also carried English-language articles.

The presence of the three newspapers meant that the Winnipeg Jewish community was able to use them (as historian Lewis Levendel put it) "as conveyor belts for their news." The three-way rivalry continued until Dos Yiddishe Vort closed in 1981, and then ended in 1987.

== The Jewish Post & News ==
The Western Jewish News engaged in a fierce fight for advertising with the Jewish Post for six decades until it was purchased by The Jewish Post in 1987, resulting in the paper's merger and current name of The Jewish Post & News which continues publishing to this day.

== Bibliography ==
- Levendel, Lewis (1989). A Century of the Canadian Jewish Press: 1880s-1980s. Ottawa: Borealis Press. ISBN 0-88887-909-1
