= Bravado Cartel =

English rock band from Huddersfield

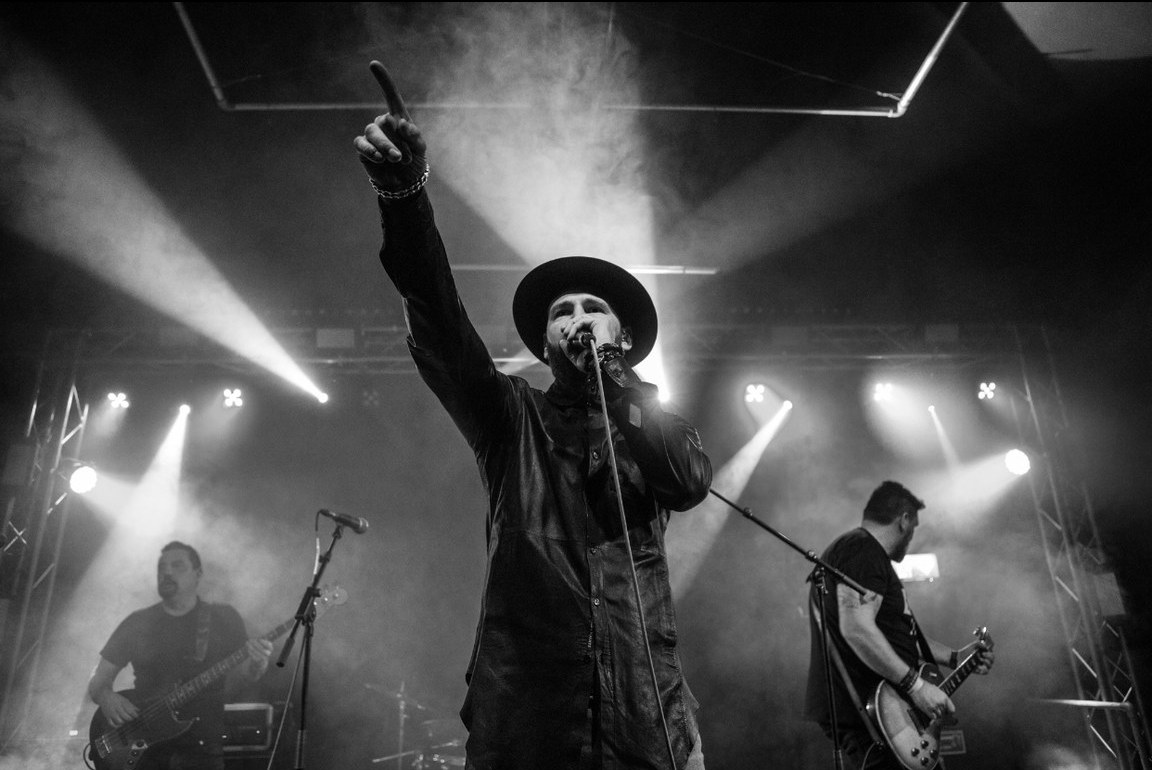
Bravado Cartel

Bravado Cartel are an English rock band from Huddersfield, West Yorkshire, consisting of Will Bloy (vocals), Jonny Green (guitar), Shayne Whitton (drums), Jonathan Armstrong (bass guitar) and William Gould (keyboards), particularly noted for their 2016 UK single "Just Like Fighting Shadows" with Emma Kirke, which charted 33 in the i-Tunes rock downloads in that year. The band have released five studio albums spanning the period 2009 to 2019.

== History ==
Originally named RedStar, the band was formed by Will Bloy after leaving the armed forces in 2004. Early members included Steve Smith (guitars), Shayne Whitton (drums), Tim Whiteley (bass) and Gary Hutchinson (keyboards). In 2005, Joe Leadbeater replaced Hutchinson on keyboards and on 2007 Smith was replaced by Jonny Green on guitars. In the early years, RedStar gigged in pubs and clubs across the north of England but expanded to regular slots in London and a tour of Holland.

In the summer of 2012, the band reached fourth place at Live and Unsigned out of a pool of approximately 40,000 band entries, which resulted in a gig at the O2 Arena, London. During this period, RedStar's music was described by a music journalist at The Apollo Festival, as having 'great lyrics, stomping riffs and anthemic choruses ... [with] West Yorkshire accents seeping through the vocals, giving a feeling of home and heart right within the music ... RedStar are moving their genre forward and are definitely ones to watch'.

== Huddersfield A.F.C. and "Smile Awhile" ==
In 2013, RedStar were asked to write and record the official song for Huddersfield Town A.F.C. The resulting single "Smile Awhile" was based on the lyrics of the club's 1920 song of the same title, originally adapted from a First World War song, "Till We Meet Again". Released in late 2013, "Smile Awhile" supported the Huddersfield Town Foundation and became the team's match song starting all games for three years, including the year Huddersfield Town entered the Premiership. The song charted in the top 10 on i-Tunes Rock downloads in 2013, and achieved just under 35,000 views on YouTube. A second i-Tunes top 40 single followed with "Just Like Fighting Shadows", written and recorded with Emma Kirke in 2016.

== Tours of the United States ==
In 2014, Green left the band due to ill health and Leadbeater announced he would be leaving to tour with Joanne Shaw Taylor for 12 months. In 2015, Whiteley was replaced by Jonathan Armstrong on bass, Green was replaced by Karl Woolston, Leadbeater was replaced by Jack Manning (keyboards and guitars) and Whitton (temporarily) by Stefan Drapan. In the same year, the band's name was changed to Bravado Cartel. In the years 2016, 2017 and 2018 the band toured the US, performing in Hard Rock Cafés in Boston and New York, conducting radio shows and playing at New York's oldest rock club, The Bitter End (2018). The first tour was set up by Bruce Replogle, ex-publicist of John Lennon on Double Fantasy. Jonny Green returned to the band as guitarist in 2017.

In 2020, Manning left the band and was replaced by William Gould on keyboards. Bravado Cartel continued to write and record material through the Covid pandemic and returned to live performances from the summer of 2021. In November 2022, the band signed with Paint The World Music, and recorded two singles in early 2023 - "I'm Always There for You Digitally" and "Revolution on the Lips". In September 2023, the band released the single "Everything and Anything" which became the official song for the nationwide mental health charity Andy's Man Club. The video for the song was filmed during a gig at the Piece Hall, Halifax, West Yorkshire and was sponsored by Battenbrook Clothing. The lead role in the video was played by actor Jamie Dorrington. who has appeared in the British soap opera, Emmerdale.

== Musical style ==
Imogen Bell described Bravado Cartel's sound as "a mix of old-school rock like Led Zeppelin and new-school mashups of mould-breakers Arctic Monkeys fused with the swagger of Oasis". The same review compared the synth and piano inflected rock of the band as comparable to early Kasabian.

== Discography ==
=== Studio albums ===
- Law and Order – 2009
- Revelator – 2012
- The Vaults – 2013
- Violence Has no Place at the Table of Democracy – 2016
- Anything for an Easy Life – 2019
