= Di royte fon (1906) =

Yiddish newspaper

Di royte fon ('The Red Flag') was an illegal Yiddish-language publication in Congress Poland, issued by the Social Democracy of the Kingdom of Poland and Lithuania (SDKPiL) from Warsaw between June and September 1906. The publication was part of a short-lived effort (1905-1906) of the SDKPiL to organize Jewish workers in the Pale of Settlement.

== See also ==
- Di royte fon (1920)
