= Red Star, Kentucky =

Unincorporated community in Kentucky, United States

- Unincorporated community
- Location in Kentucky Location in the United States
- Coordinates: 37°7′52″N 83°1′1″W
- Country: United States
- State: Kentucky
- County: Letcher
- Elevation: 1,152 ft (351 m)
- Time zone: UTC-5 (Eastern (EST))
  - Summer (DST): UTC-4 (EDT)
- GNIS feature ID: 2336185

Red Star was an unincorporated community in Letcher County, Kentucky, United States. It is described as being a coal camp or coal town.
