= Magen David (newspaper) =

- Publisher: Jewish Community of Armenia
- Editor-in-chief: Adelina Livshitz
- Editor: Karen Hovhannesyan
- Language: Armenian, Hebrew, Russian
- Headquarters: 69 Yeznik Koghbatsi Street, Yerevan, Armenia
- Website: jewish.am

Magen David or Davti Vahan (Armenian: Դավթի վահան, Shield of David) is the only Jewish newspaper in Armenia. It is published monthly by the Yerevan-based non-governmental organization Jewish Community of Armenia.

== History ==
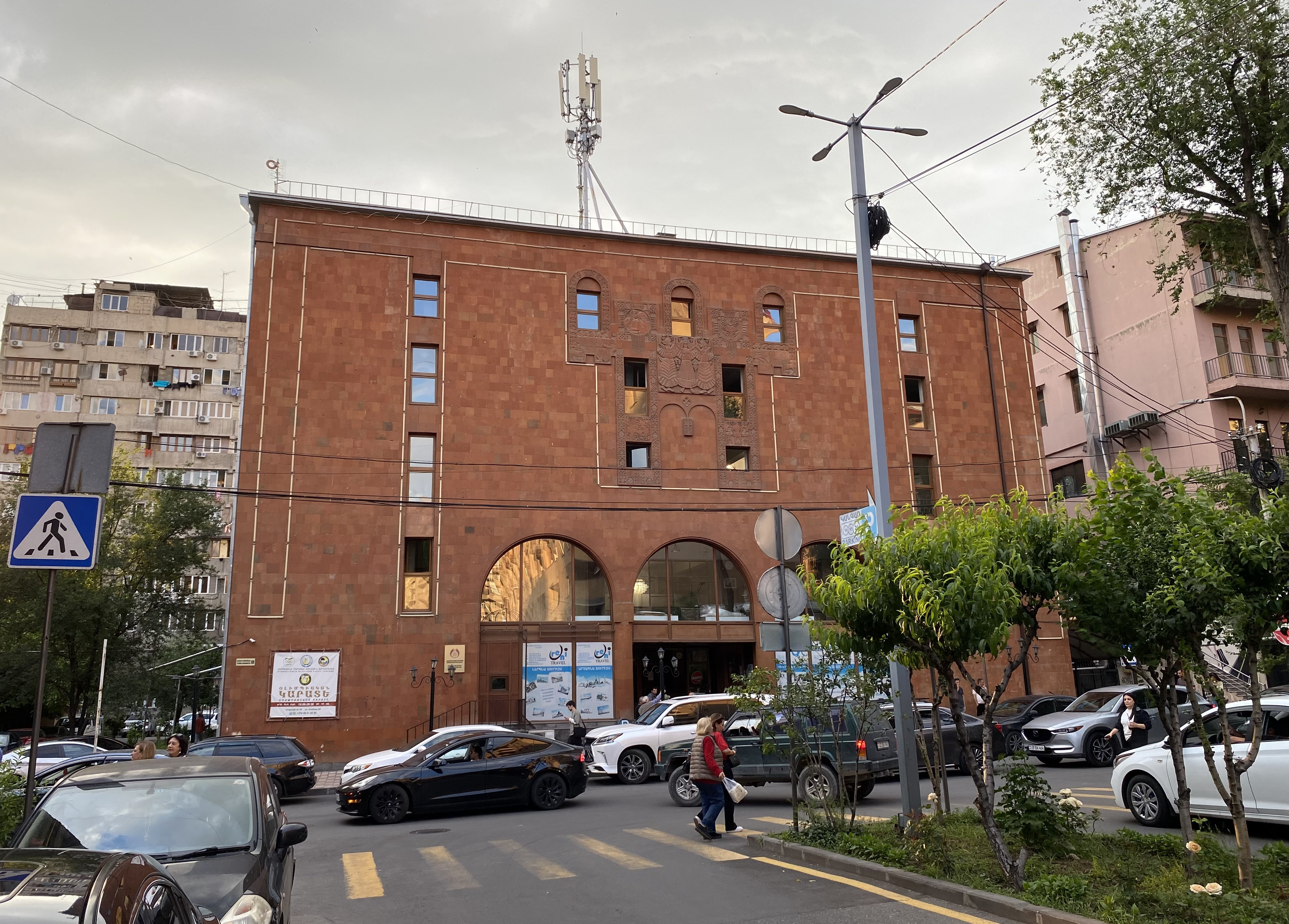
Building hosting the newspaper's editorial office in Yerevan

Magen David was established by the Jewish Community of Armenia in 2002. Throughout its history, it has been mostly funded by grants from Armenia's state budget allocated through the Council for National Minorities. However, after a temporary funding suspension in 2021 it was at risk of closure. The newspaper's small editorial office eventually received financial support from the local security equipment supply company Zvezda owned by Igor Podolsky, a member of Armenia's Jewish community.

The newspaper is co-edited by Adelina Livshitz, a Ukraine-born Armenian-Israeli journalist, and Karen Hovhannesyan, an Armenian-Jewish native of Yerevan who used to work as an electrical engineer. It is affiliated with the Euro-Asian Jewish Congress.

== Contents and distribution ==
Monthly issues of the newspaper feature articles on Jewish communal life, holidays and cultural events held by the community, history of Armenia's Jewry, as well as local and global news with a special focus on Israel. The newspaper is trilingual, with most articles being in Russian and some of them either fully translated into or summarized in Armenian and Hebrew. Paper copies are distributed free of charge at the community's Yerevan office, and a digital archive of issues published since 2018 can be accessed on the organization's website.
