= Realitatea Evreiască =

Romanian cultural and news magazine

- Editor: Alexandru Marinescu
- Publisher: Federation of Jewish Communities of Romania
- Founder: Moses Rosen
- Founded: 1956
- Country: Romania
- Based in: Bucharest
- Language: Romanian; Yiddish; Hebrew; English
- Website: romanianjewish.org
- ISSN: 1223-7736
- OCLC: 752987901

Realitatea Evreiască (Romanian for "The Jewish Reality") is a Romanian cultural and news magazine, based in Bucharest, and addressed to the local Jewish community. The magazine was founded in 1956 under the name Revista Cultului Mozaic din România ("Review of the Mosaic Religion in Romania"), but in 1995 it changed its name to Realitatea Evreiască. Its publisher is the Federation of Jewish Communities of Romania.

In October 1956 Rabbi Moses Rosen received an authorization to publish Revista Cultului Mozaic. The official press organ of Romanian Jewry during the communist period, it was issued in Romanian, Yiddish and Hebrew. By 1970 it had become the only Jewish periodical in Romania. With its last-page articles in Hebrew, it was for more than thirty years the only Hebrew-language journal to be printed in all the Second World. Scholar Ezra Fleischer, formerly jailed in Romanian communist prisons as a Refusenik, was one of Revista Cultului Mozaic's original editors, before his emigration to Israel.
