= Red Star (publication) =

Publication of the Red Women's Detachment of the Marxist-Leninist Party, USA

Red Star was a communist publication created by the Red Women's Detachment, consisting of six issues released between March 1970 and October 1971. Articles in Red Star advocate for communist revolution to bring about women's liberation and focus on themes of violent revolution, welfare, and birth control. The Red Women's Detachment differs from traditional women's groups in its working class demographics and its revolutionary ideals, and is critical of the Women's Liberation Movement.

== The Red Women's Detachment ==
The Red Women's Detachment was a New York City based communist women's organization made up of working-class women and women on welfare. The Red Women's Detachment was a part of the Marxist–Leninist Party with a theoretical basis in Mao Tse-tung Thought (also known as Mao Zedung Thought or Maoism). In their own words, "The force at the core leading our cause forward is the Marxist-Leninist Party." Marxism–Leninism is a communist ideology founded on the works and ideas of Karl Marx and Vladimir Lenin. The Red Women's Detachment's was run by a Central Committee and had a structured organizational system. The second issue of Red Star lays out this organization in the "Draft Constitution of the Red Women's Detachment," outlining three groups: Mao Tse Tung Thought study groups, martial arts collectives, and women's armed defense groups.

== Publication information ==
The Central Committee of the Red Women's Detachment created and published Red Star in New York City and distributed it to other women's organizations in the United States, particularly those composed of working-class women sympathetic to their communist revolutionary goals, including Bread and Roses in Cambridge, MA; Female Liberation in Somerville, MA; Women's Caucus in Chicago, IL; and Radical Women in Seattle, WA. Other women's groups in the Red Women's Detachment's circle included The New Orleans Female Workers Union and The White Panther Party. Red Star consists of articles written by the Red Women's Detachment or reprinted from other sources.

== Topic discussed ==
=== Revolution ===
The Red Women's Detachment advocated revolution by the working class. They believed such a revolution was the only way for women to be liberated. The first issue contains a call to arms, asking women to "arm for proletarian revolution." An article by the Women's Armed Defense Groups branch of the Red Women's Detachment titled Guns, Sisters, Guns asserts that for women to be liberated and for revolution to be successful, women need to be armed and learn combat skills. The same issue contains diagrams indicating targets on the male body in combat situations. Articles including "Revolutionary Women: Fight Back!!", "Women in Struggle", and "Indian Heroines in Peasant Armed Revolutionary Struggle", discuss women's participation in revolutions around the world. One of the countries included India, where the article discuss the involvement of Indian women in the Peasant Armed Revolutionary Struggle such as the 1967 Naxalbari Uprising, where peasants and laborers revolted against the local government and land owners. The reprinted article "Vietnamese Women" asserts that the August Revolution liberated Vietnamese women, and that "the Vietnamese woman has literally won equality with a weapon in her hand and through the sheer strength of her arms". The article "Open Letter to Welfare Women", written by the Red Women's Detachment, asserts that they "are following the example of our brave sister-comrades in China and Albania who fought long and hard for socialism which brought about their liberation."

=== Welfare ===
In the 1960s, based on considering poverty a social problem and not an individual problem, President Johnson launched a war on poverty including welfare reform. Red Star critiques contemporary welfare rights groups and proposes a system to benefit women that emphasizes collaboration and solidarity of working class and welfare women. The Red Women's Detachment denounced parts of the welfare rights movement focused on the welfare struggle but did not consider other struggles and potential coalitions. The welfare discussion based in their revolutionary ideals argues that they "will never get what [they] want except by an armed revolution followed by socialism." Their child care goals include educating children about politics and self defense "to make children revolutionary fighters." The article "Open Letter to Welfare Women" opposes forced birth control based on class or welfare status. In the mid-1960s, almost all states had public funding for birth control, in some states through the welfare department.

=== Birth control ===
The first issue of Red Star includes a two-page article entitled "The Genocideology of Birth Control" and the second issue includes an "Open Letter to Welfare Women" that discusses birth control and forced sterilization to prevent working-class women from reproducing. The Red Women's Detachment reports Richard Nixon July 18, 1969 address to Congress, where he explained the dangers of population growth and advocated creating the Commission on Population Growth and the American Future and an increased availability for family planning. The Red Women's Detachment critiques Malthusian notions of population control and refers to family planning efforts by the government as "conspiratorial schemes of racial extermination." Individuals who subscribed to eugenics, including doctors, scientists, and politicians, deemed women on welfare, particularly women of color, "unfit" to reproduce. Doctors performed tubal ligations and hysterectomies on such women without their consent or knowledge. During the 1950s and 1960s, while poor women, women of color, and disabled women were coercively rendered infertile, middle and upper class white women were prevented from accessing methods of birth control that contributed to the Women's Liberation Movement's focus on birth control access. In The "Genocideology of Birth Control", the Red Women's Detachment critiques the Women's Liberation Movement for advocating the repeal of abortion laws while working-class women on welfare were forcibly sterilized.

=== The Women's Liberation Movement ===
Many women's groups while Red Star's was published challenged the notion that women belong in the private sphere and should conform to stereotypical women's roles. The Red Women's Detachment considered the National Organization for Women (NOW) to be "bourgeois-feminist." In the second issue of Red Star, they describe the Red Women's Detachment as a women's liberation group, but "different from the other groups in several ways." They differ from traditional women's liberation groups in that their membership is working class and they advocate for revolution and socialism to achieve women's liberation. The Red Women's Detachment was critical of the women's movement, particularly because of its middle and upper class demographics. The experience of working-class women was different from middle and upper classes as their economic position did not allow them to stay in the private sphere. Therefore, their struggles did not align with that of women's groups attempting to gain autonomy and fulfillment through entering the workforce. The Red Women's Detachment argues that women's oppression can not be separated from class oppression, noting "the task now is to overthrow the bourgeoise to bring about the dictatorship of the proletariat, not fight the male supremacy by itself as if it were not a component of class rule" aligning with the 1950s communist view that "one of the explicit purposes of bourgeois culture was to keep women down." The feminist's conceptualization of women and women's issues as essential and universal served to exclude groups of people based on class, race, and sexuality.

== Inside Each Issue ==
=== Issue Number 1 - March 1970 ===
Contents:

- Stalin's 1925 speech on International Women's Day
- Toward A Working Women's International
- The Genocideology of Birth Control
- Revolutionary Women: Fight Back!!
- Vietnamese Women
- Women in Struggle

=== Issue Number 2 - April 1970 ===
Contents:

- Open Letter to Welfare Women
- Correspondence
- Power to the Proletarian Women
- The Rise and Fall of Feminism in America: "Everyone Was Brave"
- They Love Their Uniforms Not Silks and Satins
- We are Critics of the Old World
- Draft Constitution of the Red Women's Detachment
- Quotations from Chairman Mao Tsetung
- Call to arms

=== Issue Number 3 - August 1970 ===
Contents:

- I am for the Slogan "Fear Neither Hardship nor Death"
- Indian Heroines in Peasant Armed Revolutionary Struggle
- The Struggle Between Two Lines at the Moscow World Congress of Women
- Children of the World Unite!

=== Issue Number 4 - December 1970 ===
Contents:

- The History of All Hitherto Existing Class Systems has been the History of Women's Oppression
- Some Aspects of the Problem of the Albanian Women
- Mrs. Kang Ban Sok: Mother of the Great Leader of Korea
- City-Run Daycare Centers or Co-Operative Nurseries?
- The Invincible P.L.A.F.

=== Issue Number 5 - March 1971 ===
Contents:

- Monogamy, Prostitution, and the Family
- Guns, Sisters, Guns
- Letter Addressed to the Women of the Counterfeit Left
- Red Women's Detachment Letter to the Feminists
- On Some Aspects of the Problem of the Albanian Women
- Study Marxist Dialects and be a Vanguard Fighter in Consciously Making Revolution
