= Der arbeyter =

Yiddish-language weekly newspaper published

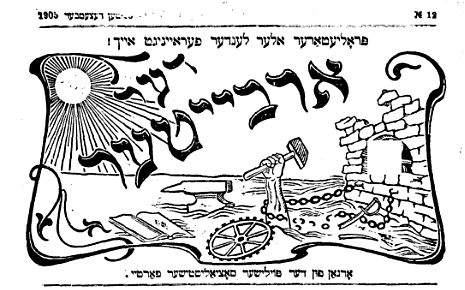
- Publisher: Polish Socialist Party
- Editor: Maks Horwitz, Leon Wasilewski, Feliks Sachs
- Founded: 1898
- Ceased publication: 1905
- Political alignment: Socialist
- Language: Yiddish
- Headquarters: London (1898-1901), Vilna (1902-), Warsaw (1905-)
- Circulation: 1,500 (1898), 20,000 (1905)

Der arbeyter (דער ארבײטער, 'The Worker') was a Yiddish-language newspaper, issued by the Polish Socialist Party (PPS). The newspaper was launched in 1898, named after a Galician Jewish social democratic publication by the same name. Der arbeyter was initially published from London.

== London period ==
Initially Der arbeyter had a circulation of 1,500 copies, intended for distribution inside Congress Poland. Maks Horwitz, the sole Yiddish-speaking intellectual in PPS at the time, was the founding editor of the publication.

Der arbeyter argued that a Polish democratic republic had to be established in order to achieve Jewish emancipation and socialism. It opposed Russification of the Jewish population in Poland. Furthermore, it consistently used the term 'Jew' as a religious, not national, denomination. Catholic Poles were labelled as 'Christians' in its articles, and the publication stressed that Jewish and Christians alike were equally part of the Polish nation and the Polish proletariat. This approach contrasted the line of the General Jewish Labour Bund, who argued that Jews constituted a separate national group in the Russian empire.

Der arbeyter was mainly directed towards mobilizing support for PPS amongst Jewish workers in Poland. The PPS lagged behind its competitor, the General Jewish Labour Bund, in terms of Yiddish-language publishing. Thus, PPS felt it could not compete with the Bundist press amongst the Jewish intelligentsia, it concentrated its propaganda work toward Jewish labourers. Der arbeyter dealt with questions of everyday working class life, rather than theoretical articles.

Horwitz, who had edited the first edition of Der arbeyter, was arrested in Warsaw in 1899. Thus the PPS no longer had any person who could manage a Yiddish publication. After Horwitz's arrest, the PPS cadre Leon Wasilewski learned Yiddish so that the publication could be continued and a second edition could be published. With the arrival of Feliks Sachs, who spoke fluent Yiddish, to the PPS centre in London, two more editions were published in 1901 (April and August). Sachs eventually became the editor of Der arbeyter and the head of the Jewish section of PPS.

== Shift to Vilnius ==
In 1902, the seventh issue of Der arbeyter was published. Now the publishing had shifted from London to Vilnius. Detached from the PPS centre in London, Sachs implemented changes in the editorial line of the paper. It began to talk about the Jewish people as a separate national group, and about Poland and Lithuania as two separate countries.

In 1902 the PPS centre in London began publishing a new Yiddish periodical, Di proletarishe velt.

== Warsaw weekly ==
As of 1905 (the year of revolution in the Russian empire), Der arbeyter had become a weekly paper published from Warsaw and reached a circulation of 20,000. The publication ceased later the same year.
