= Jewish Rhode Island =

Monthly newspaper

- Type: Monthly newspaper
- Owner: Jewish Alliance of Greater Rhode Island
- Founded: 1929
- Headquarters: 401 Elmgrove Avenue Providence, RI 02906
- Website: jewishrhody.com

Jewish Rhode Island is a monthly newspaper that serves the Jewish communities of the state of Rhode Island. The newspaper's origins were in 1929, then a weekly called The Jewish Herald until 1958, then called Rhode Island Herald until 1989. It merged with a monthly Jewish publication called The Voice, for a period adopting the name The Jewish Voice & Herald.
