= Mixed marriage =

Mixed marriage may refer to:

- Intermarriage
  - Endogamy, the act of marrying inside of one's own specific group
  - Exogamy, the act of marrying outside of one's own specific group
    - Interracial marriage, between people of different races
      - Miscegenation, a pejorative term for interracial sexual relationships
    - Interethnic marriage, between people of different ethnicities
    - Interfaith marriage, between people who adhere to different religions
      - Interdenominational marriage, between people who adhere to different sects of the same religion
- Marital conversion, the act of converting to one's partner's religion in order to facilitate marriage and thereby assimilate into their society
- Royal intermarriage, between people belonging to different royal dynasties
- Transnational marriage, between people who are not citizens of the same country
- Mixed-orientation marriage, between people who do not have corresponding sexual orientations
  - Lavender marriage, between a man and a woman who seek to feign heterosexuality
- Mixed Marriage (play), a 1911 Irish play
