= Wloclawker Weker =

Former Yiddish newspaper in Poland

- Type: Weekly newspaper
- Political alignment: General Jewish Labour Bund
- Language: Yiddish
- Headquarters: Włocławek
- Country: interbellum Poland

Wloclawker Weker was a Yiddish-language weekly newspaper in interbellum Poland, published from Włocławek. Wloclawker Weker was an organ of the General Jewish Labour Bund in Poland.
