= Grodner Sztyme =

Yiddish newspaper in Poland (1927–1939)

- Type: weekly newspaper
- Political alignment: General Jewish Labour Bund
- Language: Yiddish
- Headquarters: Zamkowa 12, Grodno
- Country: interbellum Poland

Grodner Sztyme (Yiddish: גראָדנער שטימע, 'Grodno Voice') was a Yiddish-language weekly newspaper in interbellum Poland, published from Grodno (in present-day Belarus). Grodner Sztyme was an organ of the General Jewish Labour Bund in Poland. It was published 1927–1939. A total of 205 issues were published. Mosze Rubinsztejn was the editor and publisher of Grodner Sztyme 1927–1935, followed by I. Lewi. It was printed by M. Mejłachowicz.

On October 5, 1939, Berl Abramovitz (one of the editors of Grodner Sztyme) was arrested.
