= Arbeiterstimme =

Jewish Russian newspaper

Arbeiterstimme (Worker's Voice) was the central organ of the General Jewish Labour Bund in Lithuania, Poland and Russia. It appeared from 1897 to 1905, as an underground publication. The Bund resumed the publication, now as a legal paper, after the February Revolution of 1917.
