= Der yidisher komunist =

- Type: weekly newspaper
- Founded: June 1919
- Political alignment: Communist
- Language: Yiddish
- Headquarters: Gomel
- Country: Soviet Byeloruss

Der yidisher komunist (Yiddish: דער אידישער קאמוניסט, 'The Jewish Communist') was a short-lived Yiddish language newspaper published from Gomel. It was founded as a weekly newspaper in June 1919. It was the organ of the Yevsektsiya (Jewish Section of the Communist Party) in Gomel.
