= Munkatsher Humorist =

Yiddish satirical periodical

Munkatsher Humorist (Yiddish: מונקאטשער הומאָריסט) was a Yiddish language satirical weekly, published in Munkács, Subcarpathian Rus', Czechoslovakia (present-day Mukachevo in Ukraine) between 1924 and 1927. The paper was published by Aser Zelig Weiss, a badchen (Jewish wedding entertainer) famous in the city. The publication was popular among the local Jewish community.

Munkatsher Humorist was published on Wednesdays. It featured local news and comments on current events, as well as anecdotes and jokes. The newspaper carried advertisements in Yiddish, German and Hungarian. The language used in Munkatsher Humorist was distinctively folksy and idiomatic, showcasing a rich repository of the local Yiddish dialect.

The paper was politically independent. The paper ridiculed local Jewish internal politics, in particular joking about the struggles of the Hasidic courts of Munkács and Belz.

The launching of Munkatsher Humorist in 1924 had been preceded the same year by the emergence in Munkács of the daily newspaper Dos Yidishe Folksblat ('The Jewish People's Newspaper') during the lead-up to the 1924 election. In 1927 a rival Yiddish daily, Yidishe Tzaytung ('Jewish Newspaper'), was founded by Chief Rabbi Chaim Elazar Shapira. Munkatsher Humorist would dedicate significant attention to the squabbles between the two dailies.

The copies of the periodical were printed by the Meisels Bernat printing shop. The paper consisted of four pages. The format was 24x32 cm.

Munkatsher Humorist was eventually driven out of the market by other Yiddish-language publications.
