= The Jewish Word =

Polish-Jewish magazine published in Warsaw

The Jewish Word Słowo Żydowskie דאס אידישע ווארט
- Cover page (2020)
- Editor: Artur Hofman
- Categories: Jewish life in Poland, news, art, cultural events
- Frequency: Monthly
- Format: A4
- Publisher: Social and Cultural Association of Jews in Poland (TSKŻ)
- Founded: 1992
- Country: Poland
- Based in: Warsaw
- Language: Polish, Yiddish
- Website: tskz.pl/en/slowo-zydowskie-2/
- ISSN: 0867-8421

The Jewish Word (Polish: Słowo Żydowskie – Yiddish: דאס אידישע ווארט, romanized: Dos Jidisze Wort; stylized as SŁOשO ŻYDOWSKIE) is a bilingual periodical magazine published monthly in Polish and Yiddish. Founded in 1992, it is currently the primary Jewish publication in Poland.

== History ==
It was founded 1992 to replace a previous periodical newspaper called Folks-Sztyme ("People's Voice"), published in the Polish People's Republic between 1946 and 1991. In the 1950s the publishing rights were transferred to the Social and Cultural Association of Jews in Poland (TSKŻ), which was founded after the merging of the Central Committee of Jews in Poland with the Jewish Society of Culture and Art. However, the Polish United Workers' Party (PZPR) had direct control over the newspaper's editors and enforced censorship. The political shift to democracy at the end of the 1980s allowed the publication of free content.

The number of readers gradually decreased due to the emigration of Polish Jews following World War II. The 1968 political crisis and an antisemitic campaign orchestrated by the Communist Party caused several branches of the publication to be closed, particularly in the Lower Silesia region. It was subsequently converted from a weekly into a monthly publication.

== Modern times ==
The contemporary magazine is the longest published Jewish periodical on the Polish market. It presents an outlook on Polish-Jewish life in modern times, whilst also presenting unusual stories, curiosities and interviews. The primary aspect of "The Jewish Word" is attention to culture and art.

The magazine is sold in some kiosks and bookstores across Poland, including Empik.

== See also ==
- Jews
- History of Jews in Poland
- List of Yiddish newspapers and periodicals
