= Der Bay =

Anglo-Yiddish newsletter

- Type: Monthly newsletter
- Owner: Philip "Fishl" Kutner
- Publisher: Philip "Fishl" Kutner
- Editor: Philip "Fishl" Kutner
- Founded: 1991
- Headquarters: 1128 Tanglewood Way; San Mateo, California 94403
- Website: www.derbay.org

The first issue of Der Bay was published in January 1991 as a local newsletter for the Yiddish community in the United States. As an Anglo-Yiddish publication, the articles were mainly in English with some Yiddish and others in transliteration. It grew steadily so that Yiddish club leaders, Yiddish teachers, translators, performers and klezmer group leaders in every state and in 35 other countries received it.

It was a 16-page monthly that was published 10 times a year with a suggested contribution of $18 a year. It was augmented by its website at www.derbay.org and was the organ of the International Association of Yiddish Clubs (IAYC). Regular monthly columns included: Der internatsyonaler kalendar, Oystsugen fun briv in der redaktsye, Der altveltlekher farband fun yidish-klubn nayes, monthly updates on the upcoming IAYC conference, original Chełm stories, stories about mama and poetry, articles and stories submitted by readers.

The last issue was published in January 2016 on its 25th anniversary. The website still exists and is a resource for Yiddish teachers, club leaders, translators and klezmer musicians.
