= Forojs =

Yiddish-language arts and literature magazine

Forojs was a fortnightly Yiddish-language arts and literature magazine published by the General Jewish Labour Bund from Warsaw, Poland.
