= JTNews =

Newspaper in Washington, US (1924–2015)

The JTNews (formerly The Jewish Transcript) was a Jewish-American newspaper that served the U.S. state of Washington. The biweekly paper, published in Seattle, was owned by the Jewish Federation of Greater Seattle and had a readership of 16,000. Founded by Herman Horowitz, it was first published on March 6, 1924, as the Jewish Transcript of the Pacific Northwest. The paper ceased publication in February 2015.
