= Dos Yiddishe Licht =

Yiddish weekly publication

Dos Yiddishe Licht (Yiddish: דאָס יידישע ליכט; transl. This Jewish/Yiddish light) is the name of two different Haredi publications, that came out in the 20th century. They had a black & white paper cover.

== New York, 1923 ==
In 1923, Reb Shraga Feivel Mendlowitz and the Chazzan Yossele Rosenblatt produced Dos Yiddishe Licht, a short-lived English and Yiddish language weekly that included articles of comment and inspiration. It eventually became a daily but was forced to discontinue publication in 1927, because of financial difficulties. In fact, Chazan Rosenblatt went on a year-long concert tour to pay back the monies owed to creditors.

== Jerusalem, 1950 ==
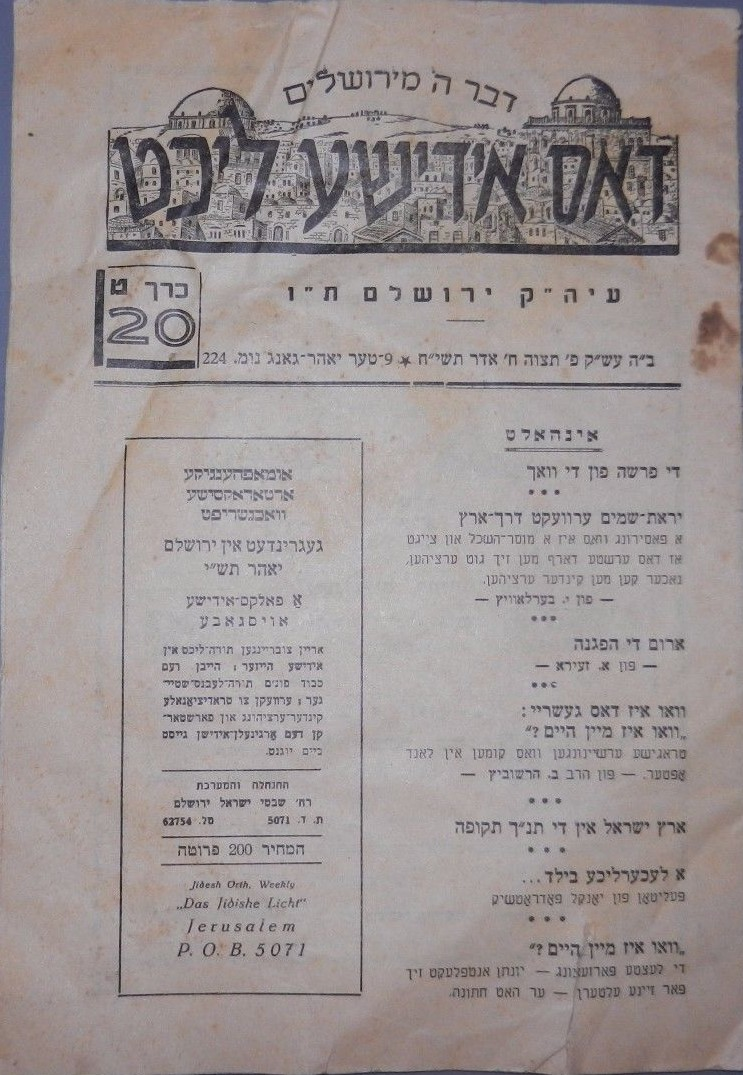
Cover of Dos Yiddishe Licht 1958

Dos Yiddishe Licht - Independent Orthodox Weekly. Established in Jerusalem, in 1950. A folks-Yiddish publication. To enter Torah Light in Jewish Houses; raise the glory of Torah-life-style; awaken to traditional children's education and strengthen the original-Jewish spirit at the youth.

— Weekly cover of "Dos Yiddishe Licht"

Dos Yiddishe Licht was founded by R' Moshe Ehrntal, an activist of the Yishuv haYashan and had his fingerprints. DYL was formerly one of the only few Kosher Yiddish reading material for children. It was published by "Bnos Yerusheloyim".

== 2001 as Beleichtungen ==
In 2001 it was established in Jerusalem "Dos Yiddisher Licht - Beleichtungen association" (NGO), by David Erenthal, Shlomo Brandwin, Yoel Sheinberger, Akiva Chaim Greenfeld, Jacob Jacob, Amram Katzenelbogen and Chaim Israel Mintzberg, with the following official goals: "Publishing Jewish material in the Yiddish language. Support for Yiddish-speaking institutions and organizations. Promoting the penetration of the Yiddish language into the public consciousness."

Beleichtungen is the newer version of Dos Yiddishe Licht. Unlike its forerunner and umbrella company, it follows a more modern style with a more sophisticated graphic layout. While Dos Yiddishe Licht had a paper cover including only a picture of another Jewish leader, Beleichtungen is printed in glossy paper, and in full colored graphic.
