= Der royter shtern (Vitebsk) =

- Founded: August 19, 1920
- Ceased publication: 1923
- Political alignment: Communist
- Language: Yiddish language
- Headquarters: Vitebsk
- Circulation: 4,000

Der royter shtern (Yiddish: דער רויטער שטערן, 'The Red Star') was a Yiddish-language newspaper published from the Soviet city of Vitebsk between 1920 and 1923. It was the organ of the Jewish Section of the Communist Party Committee of the Vitebsk Governorate. The first issue was published on August 19, 1920. It was published as a daily newspaper for about a year, and then became a weekly. Between the 9th (April 1920) and 10th (March 1921) congresses of the Russian Communist Party (bolsheviks), 268 issues of Der royter shtern were published. It had a circulation of around 4,000.

At first it was edited by a collective. Later Leib Abram (former Bundist, member of the Central Committee of the Communist Party (bolsheviks) of Bielorussia), became the editor of Der royter shtern, followed by M. Patasch.
