= Flatbush Jewish Journal =

Upstate New York newspaper

- Type: Weekly newspaper
- Founder: Mordy Mehlman
- Founded: 2010
- City: New York City, New York
- Country: United States
- Website: https://www.flatbushjewishjournal.com/

Flatbush Jewish Journal (FJJ) is a Brooklyn-based weekly newspaper catering to the Orthodox Jewish community. It is closely associated with Agudath Israel of America.

== Overview ==
Mordy Mehlman, who founded the FJJ in 2010, claimed that 19,000 homes receive the publication. Larry Gordon, publisher of the Five Towns Jewish Times (another New York-based newspaper) claimed that FJJ was modelled after his own publication. In 2015, the physical page size shrank due to a change that reduced printing costs.

The newspaper is closely associated with Agudath Israel of America, an Orthodox Jewish advocacy organization. While the publication's audience is the Orthodox community in New York City, the name Flatbush Jewish Journal hints towards a focus on the Brooklyn neighborhood of Midwood, which many Jews consider to be part of Flatbush. For religious reasons, the newspaper refuses to print pictures of women or girls. If a yartzeit article is published about a woman, the accompanying photo, if present, is of her husband.

== Features ==
Reb Yaakov, The Life and Times of HaGaon Rabbi Yaakov Kamenetsky serialized 2021 by FJJ

FJJ publishes ongoing Torah content by several well-known rabbis; Artscroll books are serialized. Some of their weekly columnists with professional recognition feature a reader's letter and a response, sometimes continued to the following week. Content from Artscroll volumes previously or presently excerpted include writings by or about Yaakov Kamenetsky (Reb Yaakov: The Life and Times of HaGaon Rabbi Yaakov Kamenetsky), Abraham J. Twerski (Letters To My Children) and Avraham Yaakov Pam (The Life and Ideals of Rabbi Avrohom Yaakov Hakohen Pam).

Since 2013 the newspaper has featured advertisements from an anonymous source aimed to reduce chatter during Jewish religious services headlined "Stop the Talking in Shul!".

The letter pages were, for ten years, the source of material for Rocky Zweig's submissions, whose presence was described by a larger Orthodox newspaper as "a weekly column." The late Zweig wrote a major satire in the guise of a full page of the Talmud, describing the reasons why Donald Trump should or should not build a wall, and why or why not Mexico should want to pay for it; it was printed as the front page of the Purim issue. The Flatbush Jewish Journal's letter pages are considered important reading: in 2013 a long-time elected legislator's negative reaction to content was covered by The Jewish Press.

== Impact ==
Local newspapers, including The New York Times, cover their content. Gordon conceded that FJJ covered Brooklyn yeshiva events well.

In April 2020, during the height of the COVID-19 pandemic in New York City, FJJ ran a 50-page obituary section. This was followed up by a shorter yartzeit tribute one year later.

== See also ==
- A Bintel Brief
