= Maalos =

Yiddish monthly magazine

- Type: Monthly publication
- Political alignment: Haredi Jewish
- Language: Yiddish

Maalos (Yiddish: מעלות; lit. "virtues, steps") is a Hasidic monthly magazine published in New York and mostly geared for women featuring a token section devoted to children. Maalos was founded by Sarah Jungreisz in 1996.

The editors have a distinct Yiddish spelling and grammar, and a distinct graphic layout. Many of the articles are written with the goal of fighting against modern assimilation. They also have articles discussing education and psychology.

Although Maalos abides by the same stringent standards as other Hasidic publications—it provides moral instruction, features no images of women, and is anti-Zionist—it places more emphasis on literary excellence than its compatriots. For example, its fiction serials include historical fiction, YA fiction with a psychological bent, and articles or stories that employ lyrical language and poetic techniques. The nonfiction pieces run the gamut from well-researched scholarly write-ups to biographies of noteworthy personalities; from self-help columns on marriage, parenting, and business to thought-provoking or controversial essays on mental health and art. Additionally—and perhaps unintentionally—Maalos serves a similar function to the work of pre-World War I classic Yiddish writers like I. L. Peretz and S. Ansky: it documents Hasidic life by highlighting the people, the pressing issues, and the tales that are central to modern-day Hasidim.
