= Der royter shtern (Buenos Aires) =

- Type: Weekly newspaper
- Ceased publication: 1934; 92 years ago
- Political alignment: Communist
- Language: Yiddish
- Country: Argentina

Der royter shtern ('Red Star') was a Yiddish-language communist newspaper published in Argentina. The first issue of Der royte shtern was published at the time of the sixth anniversary of the October Revolution. The newspaper was the weekly organ of the Jewish Section (Idsektie) of the Communist Party of Argentina. Der royte shtern played an important role in the Yiddish communist press in the country, and around it various cultural and thematic publications were issued. As of 1925, Der royter shtern had 2,000 subscribers. As of 1927, the weekly edition stood at 3,500 copies (which can be compared with the figure for the Spanish-language organ of the party, La Internacional, at 6,000 and more than the Italian-language organ Ordine Nuovo).

The newspaper continued to be published until 1934. Der royter shern was replaced by Soviet, but only one issue of the new publication was published.
