= Folks-Sztyme =

Polish and Yiddish magazine (1946–1991)

Folks-Sztyme (Yiddish: פֿאָלקס שטימע), or People's Voice in English, was a bilingual magazine published in Polish and Yiddish in Communist Poland between 1946 and 1991.

A homonymous newspaper existed before World War II. According to Henri Minczeles, the paper began to be circulated in 1946, from Łódź, but it moved to Warsaw after a few years. In 1953, the American Jewish Yearbook noted that "The only newspaper was the Communist Folks-Sztyme. It appeared four days a week and had an illustrated weekly supplement. Yiddishe Szriften, a monthly devoted to literature and art, continued to appear under the sponsorship of the Social and Cultural Union."

From 1956 onwards, it was published by the official Jewish association formed by the Communist authorities, the Social and Cultural Association of Jews in Poland (Polish: Towarzystwo Społeczno-Kulturalne Żydów w Polsce, TSKŻ).

The editor from 1950 to 1968 was Hersz (Gregory) Smolar, and after 1968 successively Samuel Tenenblatt and Adam Kwaterko.

Due to the declining number of Jews in Poland, the number of his readers constantly decreased and it became a weekly in 1968. In 1991, it ceased operations and a year later it was replaced by the monthly The Jewish Word (Polish: Słowo Żydowskie, Yiddish: Dos Jidisze Wort).
