= Di royte fon (1920) =

- Type: daily newspaper
- Editor: Moisei Rafes
- Founded: August 1, 1920
- Ceased publication: August 24, 1920
- Political alignment: Communist
- Language: Yiddish
- Headquarters: Vilna
- Country: Lithuania

Di royte fon ('The Red Banner') was a Yiddish-language daily newspaper, published in Vilna between August 1, 1920, and August 24, 1920. It was an organ of the Central Committee of the Communist Party (Bolsheviks) of Lithuania and Belorussia. Moisei Rafes was the editor of Di royte fon.
