= Aquila =

Aquila may refer to:

== Arts, entertainment, and media ==
- Aquila, a series of books by S.P. Somtow
- Aquila, a 1997 book by Andrew Norriss
- Aquila (children's magazine), a UK-based children's magazine
- Aquila (journal), an ornithological journal
- Aquila (TV series), a BBC TV production for children based on the Norriss book
- Aquila Theatre, a theatre company of New York

=== Fictional entities ===
- Aquila, a ship in the video game Star Ocean: The Last Hope
- Aquila, a ship in the video game Assassin's Creed III
- Aquila Yuna, a character in the anime Saint Seiya Omega
- Aquila, a medieval city in the fantasy film Ladyhawke (1985)
- Aquila, a character in the video game Dragon Quest IX

== People ==
- Aquila (name), a given name or surname

== Places ==
- Aquila, Michoacán, a town in Mexico
- Aquila, Switzerland, a former municipality
- Aquila, Veracruz, a municipality in Mexico
- L'Aquila, sometimes Aquila, the regional capital of Abruzzo in Italy
- Province of L'Aquila, Italy

== Transportation ==
=== Automotive ===
- Aquila Italiana, Italian car manufacturer or brand
- Aquila racing cars, a Danish firm
- Hyosung GV250, a cruiser motorcycle nicknamed the "Aquila"

=== Aviation ===
- Angus Aquila, a British aircraft
- Bristol Aquila, an aircraft engine
- Aquila, an air traffic management services company owned by NATS Holdings
- Aquila A 210, a German lightweight aircraft
- Aquila Airways, a British flying boat operator (1948–1958)
- Facebook Aquila, Facebook's design for an atmospheric satellite, a high-flying drone circling a particular location
- Lockheed MQM-105 Aquila, the U.S. Army's first battlefield reconnaissance drone
- Global 4L Aquila, a quadcopter drone; see List of UAVs

=== Boats ===
- Aquila 27, a French sailboat design

=== Ships ===
- Italian ship Aquila, various Italian naval ships
- USS Aquila, more than one ship of the United States Navy

== Other uses ==
- Aquila (bird), a genus of birds including some eagles
- Aquila (constellation), the astronomical constellation, the Eagle
- Aquila (Roman), a Roman military standard
- Aquila, Inc., a former electric and gas utility in Kansas City, Missouri, United States
- Aquila Capital, an independent investment firm in Hamburg, Germany

== See also ==
- Aguila (disambiguation)
- Aquila College of Ministries, former name of Hillsong College
- Aquila Court Building of Omaha, Nebraska
- Aquileia, an ancient Roman city in Italy
- Aquilia (disambiguation)
- Aquilinus (disambiguation)
- Aquilla (disambiguation)
- Balanus aquila, a species of barnacle
- Dell'Aquila, a surname
- Macroglossum aquila, a species of moth
- Roman Catholic Archdiocese of L'Aquila, Italy
