= Anatoly Belov =

Soviet religious scholar and propagandist

Anatoly Vasilyevich Belov (Russian: Анато́лий Васи́льевич Бело́в; 1927–1998) was a Soviet religion scholar and atheist propagandist. He was a First Deputy Chairman of the Council for Religious Affairs under the Council of Ministers of the USSR, an expert on Adventism and one of the authors of the Atheistic Dictionary and Atheist Handbook.

== Biography ==
During the Great Patriotic War he served in the Baltic Fleet. After the war he worked in a newspaper.

He graduated from the Faculty of Philosophy of Moscow State University named after M. V. Lomonosov.

In 1965, at the Moscow Institute of National Economy named after G. V. Plekhanov, he defended his thesis for the degree of Candidate of Philosophy on the topic "Seventh-day Adventists: (A critical analysis of eschatological dogma, religious peculiarities, adaptive tendencies and sect activity in the USSR)".

In 1982 he defended his thesis for the degree of Doctor of Philosophy on the topic "A critical analysis of the ideology and politics of modern clerical anti-communism" (specialty 09.00.06 - scientific atheism).

He worked as the head of the editorial staff on the subject of scientific atheism at the publishing house Politizdat.

He was a chairman of the atheistic section of journalists under the Board of the Union of Journalists of the USSR. Also, he was a member of the editorial board and author of articles in the Soviet popular science magazine Nauka i Religia (transl. Science and Religion).

== Awards ==
- Certificate of honor of the Presidium of the Supreme Council of the RSFSR (1987)

== Works ==
=== Books ===
- Белов А. В., Певзнер А. М. О праздниках престольных. — М.: Знание, 1960. — 40 с. (Брошюры-лекции. Серия 2. Философия/ Всесоюз. о-во по распространению полит. и науч. знаний; 4).
- Белов А. В., Певзнер А. М. Тайны "святых мест". — М.: Госполитиздат, 1961. — 80 с.
- Как провести занятие по научному атеизму: Методическое пособие. / А. В. Белов, А. П. Каждан, П. Ф. Колоницкий и др. — М.: Московский рабочий, 1963. — 96 с.
- Белов А. В., Никоненко С. С. Наука против суеверий. — М.: Воениздат, 1963. — 123 с. (Научно-популярная б-ка).
- Белов А. В. Адвентисты. — М.: Наука, 1964. — 159 с. (Научно-популярная серия/ Акад. наук СССР).
- Белов А. В. Правда о "святых местах". — М.: Советская Россия, 1964. — 80 с. (Отвечаем на вопросы верующих).
- Ответы верующим: Популярный справочник
  - Ответы верующим: Популярный справочник. Вып. 1 / Авт. В. П. Алексеев, А. В. Белов, Ф. И. Гаркавенко и др.; Под общ. ред. В. А. Мезенцева. — М.: Политиздат, 1964. — 383 с.
  - Ответы верующим: Популярный справочник. Вып. 2 / Авт. А. В. Белов, Н. Н. Блохин, Ф. И. Гаркавенко и др.; Под общ. ред. В. А. Мезенцева. — М.: Политиздат, 1965. — 382 с.
  - Ответы верующим: Популярный справочник. Вып. 3 / Авт. А. В. Белов, Г. Р. Гольст, В. Ф. Зыбковец и др.; Под общ. ред. В. А. Мезенцева. — М.: Политиздат, 1971. — 272 с.
- Белов А. В., Мезенцев В. А., Митрохин Л. Н., Чертихин В. Е. Беседы о религии и знании: популярный учебник. — 4-е изд., перераб. — М.: Политиздат, 1967. — 319 с.
- Белов А. В. Правда о православных "святых". — М.: Наука, 1968. — 168 с. (Научно-популярная серия/ АН СССР).
- Белов А. В. Современное сектантство. — М.: Знание, 1969. — 63 с.
- Белов А. В., Шилкин А. Д. Идеологические диверсии империализма и религия. — М.: Знание, 1970. — 47 с.
- Белов А. В., Шилкин А. Д. Религия в СССР и буржуазные фальсификаторы. — М.: Знание, 1970. — 32 с.
- Кругозор: В помощь изучающим основы политических знаний. / А. В. Белов, канд. филос. наук, Н. И. Демидов, канд. ист. наук, И. В. Милова и др.— 2-е изд. — М.: Молодая гвардия, 1971. — 303 с. (Для системы политической учёбы молодёжи)
- Белов А. В., Шилкин А. Д. Религия в современной идеологической борьбе. — М.: Знание, 1971. — 63 с.
- Белов А. В. Адвентизм. — 2-е изд. — М.: Политиздат, 1973. — 239 с. (Б-ка "Современной религии"). Тираж: 100000 экз.
- Белов А. В. Лженаставники юношества: О деятельности христианских сект. — М.: Педагогика, 1973. — 112 с. (Воспитание и обучение. Б-ка учителя).
- Белов А. В. Обвиненные в ереси. — М.: Знание, 1973. — 190 с. (Рассказы о героях и мучениках науки).
- Белов А. В., Шилкин А. Д. Западные религиозные центры на службе антикоммунизма. — М.: Знание, 1974. — 64 с.
- Белов А. В. Рождество Христово. — 2-е изд. — М.: Политиздат, 1974. — 78 с.
- Белов А. В. Карловацкий раскол — прошлое и настоящее. — М.: Знание, 1975. — 64 с. (Новое в жизни, науке, технике. Научный атеизм; 8).
- Белов А. В. Как подготовить лекцию "Религия в планах антикоммунизма". — М.: О-во "Знание" РСФСР, 1976. — 40 с. (В помощь лектору)
- Белов А. В. Мнимое братство: Атеистические очерки. — М.: Детская литература, 1976. — 144 с. Тираж: 100000 экз.
- Белов А. В., Шилкин А. Д. Диверсия без динамита. — 2-е изд., перераб. и доп. — М.: Политиздат, 1976. — 183 с. Тираж: 100000 экз.
- Белов А. В. Секты, сектантство, сектанты. — М.: Наука, 1978. — 151 с. (Научно-атеистическая серия).
- Белов А. В. Мистика на службе антикоммунизма. — М.: Знание, 1978. — 63 с. (Новое в жизни, науке, технике. Серия "Научный атеизм". № 2, 1978 г.).
- Белов А. В. Улыбка дракона: Очерки о суевериях. — М.: Молодая гвардия, 1979. — 112 с.
- 100 ответов верующим : Популярный справочник / А. В. Белов, Н. Н. Блохин, Г. Р. Гольст и др.; Под общ. ред. В. А. Мезенцева. — 2-е изд., перераб. — М.: Политиздат, 1980. — 440 с.
- Белов А. В., Карпов А. Д. Под флагом антисоветизма. — М.: Знание, 1980. — 63 с.
- Белов А. В. От рождества Христова: Атеистические очерки. / Рис. В. Терещенко. — М.: Детская литература, 1981. — 143 с.
- Белов А. В. Святые без нимбов. — М.: Советская Россия, 1983. — 213 с.
- Белов А. В., Павлов С. И., Шилкин А. Д. Миф о "религиозном возрождении" в СССР. — М.: Знание, 1983. — 64 с. (Новое в жизни, науке, технике).
- Белов А. В. О Рождестве Христовом. — 3-е изд., испр. и доп. — Пермь: Пермское книжное издательство, 1983. — 90 с.
- Белов А. В. Не делай себе кумира: Беседы о религии и знании. — М.: Молодая гвардия, 1984. — 175 с.
- Белов А. В. Современная идеологическая борьба и религия. — Тбилиси : о-во "Знание" ГССР, 1984. — 32 с. (О-во "Знание" ГССР).
- Белов А. В. Через костры и пытки / Худож. Т. Элиава. — М.: Детская литература, 1985. — 302 с.
- Белов А. В. Клерикальный антикоммунизм: идеология, политика, пропаганда. — М.: Политиздат, 1987. — 256 с. (Критика буржуазной идеологии и ревизионизма).
- Белов А. В. Когда звонят колокола: О религиозных праздниках]. — 2-е изд., перераб., доп. — М.: Советская Россия, 1988. — 333 с. ISBN 5-268-00399-2

=== Articles ===
- Белов А. В., Другов А. Духовные спекулянты и их покровители. // Труд, 20.03.1970. № 66.
- Белов А. В. Художественная литература в атеистической пропаганде // Вопросы научного атеизма. Вып. 9. Система атеистического воспитания / Редкол. сб. А. Ф. Окулов (отв. ред.) и др.; Акад. обществ. наук при ЦК КПСС. Ин-т научного атеизма. — М.: Мысль, 1970. — С. 293—304. — 406 с. — 17 500 экз.
- Белов А. В. Отповедь фальсификаторам // Наука и религия. — 1975. — № 11. — С. 96.
- Белов А. В. Мери Бекер и её "христианская наука" // Наука и религия. — 1977. — № 9. — С. 46—48
- Белов А. В. Атеистическая литература: решения и перспективы // Религии мира. История и современность. Ежегодник 1982 / Академия наук СССР. Институт востоковедения; Отв. ред. И. Р. Григулевич. — М.: Издательство «Наука». Главная редакция восточной литературы, 1982. — С. 275—278. — 285 с. — 25 000 экз.
- Белов А. В. Атеист обращается в людям // Журналист. 1982. Вып. 7-12. С. 43−46.
- Белов А. В. Христа ради юродивые // Наука и религия. 1984. № 6.

=== Compilation and scientific edition ===
- Сила проповеди: Из фр. и амер. фольклора: Пер. / сост.: А. В. Белов; Ил.: Л. Филиппова. — М.: Политиздат, 1967. — 39 с. (Художественная атеистическая библиотека)
- Христианство и Русь: Сб. ст. / АН СССР; Под общ. науч. ред. А. В. Белова . — М.: Наука, 1988. — 136 с. ("Советское религиоведение" 2).

== Sources ==
- Вопросы философии. — 1968. — Т. 22. — С. 182.
- Колкунова К. А. Атеистическая пропаганда в художественной литературе 1950–60-х годов // "Наука о религии", "Научный атеизм", "Религиоведение": актуальные проблемы научного изучения религии в России XX — начала XXI в.: коллективная монография / сост., предисл, общ. ред. К. М. Антонов. — 2-е изд.. — М.: Изд-во ПСТГУ, 2015. — С. 167—188. — 261 с. — ISBN 978-5-7429-1000-8.
- Кравченко, П. А. [in Ukrainian]; Сітарчук, Р. А. (2005). М-во освіти і науки України; Полтав. держ. пед. ун-т ім. В. Г. Короленка [in Ukrainian] (eds.). Протестантськi об'єднання в Украïнi у контекстi соцiальноï полiтики бiльшовикiв: (20-30 — і роки ХХ ст.). Полтава: АСМI. p. 13.
