= Atrocities and victims of the USSR anti-religious campaign (1928-1941) =

Stalinist USSR's promotion of state atheism

The atrocities and victims of the USSR anti-religious campaign (1928–1941) include the arrests, exiles, imprisonments and executions of clergy and believers during the Soviet anti-religious campaign. Because the campaign was conducted in secrecy, no complete record of the state's actions exists, and much of what is known about individual cases comes from church sources and later historical studies. This article summarizes the best-documented cases, mostly from the Russian Orthodox Church.

== Bishops executed or killed in custody ==
Arkadii Ostal'sky was accused in 1922 of inciting the population against the state. At his trial every witness rejected the charge, and the prosecution argued that the number of witnesses showed he was popular and that his religious preaching was harmful to the Soviet state. He was sentenced to death, commuted to ten years' hard labour, and was later consecrated a bishop. He was exiled to Solovki in 1931, returned in 1934, went into hiding, and was caught and sent to another camp. Shortly before the war, a camp administrator offered him security if he gave up the priesthood. He refused, was re-arrested and disappeared.

Metropolitan Konstantin (D'iakov) of Kyiv was arrested in 1937 and shot in prison twelve days later without trial. Metropolitan Pimen (Pegov) of Kharkiv, who had successfully resisted the local Renovationists, was arrested on charges of contacts with foreign diplomats and died in prison in 1933. Bishop Maxim (Ruberovsky) returned to Zhytomyr from prison in 1935. By 1937 about 200 priests from Soviet Volhynia had been sent to the city, and in August all of them and the bishop were arrested. They were shot that winter without trial, and the Soviet press afterwards accused them of subversion.

Archbishop Antonii of Arkhangelsk was arrested in 1932. He refused to confess to anti-Soviet activity and wrote on a questionnaire that he prayed daily for God to forgive the Soviet government its sins and stop the shedding of blood. He was tortured in prison by being given salty food without adequate water and held in an unventilated cell, and died of dysentery.

Metropolitan Serafim (Meshcheriakov) of Belorussia had led the Renovationists before returning to the Orthodox church. He was arrested in 1924 and exiled to Solovki, then re-arrested and shot without trial in Rostov-on-Don in 1932 together with 122 other clergy and monks.

Bishop Onufrii (Gagliuk) of Yelisavetgrad, now Kropyvnytskyi, was arrested in 1924 and released within a year. He was exiled to Krasnoyarsk in 1927, held two further sees after his return, and was re-arrested in the mid-1930s. He was deported beyond the Urals, where he was rumoured to have been shot in 1938. Bishop Illarion (Belsky) was exiled to Solovki from 1929 to 1935 for resisting Metropolitan Sergii. He was re-arrested in 1938 for still refusing to recognize Sergii, and was shot. Bishop Varfolomei (Remov) was accused, on information from one of his own pupils, of running a secret theological academy and was shot in 1936.

Bishop Maxim (Zhizhilenko) had worked for 25 years as a prison doctor and surgeon before becoming a bishop in 1928, and was known for his humanitarian work among prisoners. He broke with Sergii after 1927, joined the most strongly anti-Sergiite faction, and brought several parishes over to it. He was arrested in 1929 and executed in 1931.

Bishop Alexander (Petrovsky) was consecrated in 1932 and appointed to Kharkiv. He was arrested without charge in 1939 and died in prison soon afterwards.

== Priests and monastics ==
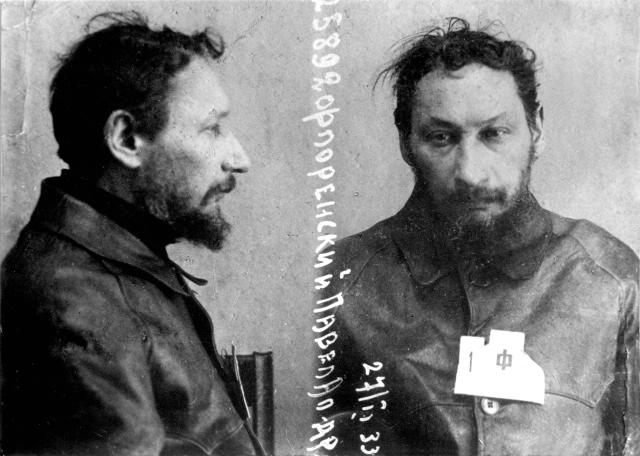
Pavel Florensky after his arrest in 1934

Pavel Florensky was a theologian, a professor of electrical engineering at the Moscow Pedagogical Institute and a consultant to the Soviet electrification office. He refused to remove his cassock and pectoral cross whenever teaching, leading to his being arrested several times from 1925 onward. He was sent to a camp in the far north in 1933, where he did research for the armed forces until his death.

Roman Medved was arrested in 1931 for acts of charity and personal influence that were drawing people to religion. He had founded an unofficial church brotherhood in the 1920s. He was released in 1936 with ruined health and died within a year. Priest Valentin Sventsitsky, a former Christian socialist journalist who became a leading opponent of the Renovationists, was exiled in 1922 and again in 1928, and died in Siberia in 1931. Alexander Zhurakovsky of Kyiv, a popular priest who had joined the opposition to Sergii, was sentenced to ten years' hard labour in 1930. He was sentenced to ten more in 1939 while gravely ill with tuberculosis, and died soon afterwards in a northern camp.

Sergii Mechev of Moscow, a prominent organizer of semi-monastic church brotherhoods, was arrested in 1922 and exiled in 1929. In 1934 he was sentenced to fifteen years in a camp in the Ukrainian SSR, and in 1941 the retreating Soviets shot him along with all prisoners serving terms longer than ten years. Antonii Elsner-Foiransky-Gogol of Smolensk was exiled in 1922 and his church was closed in 1935. In 1937 several thousand people petitioned for him to serve as priest at one of the city's last two churches, and Moscow approved the petition. He was arrested the night before services were to begin, on 21 July 1937, and shot on 1 August.

A priest named Gavriil in Kharkiv, where only one church remained open and the authorities refused to register priests to serve in it, conducted the Easter vigil there in what may have been 1936 and was never seen again.

== Mass arrests and executions ==
A convent near Kazan closed in the late 1920s, and its community had broken with Sergii. The authorities allowed the local cathedral to open once a year, on 14 February. On 14 February 1933, an armed NKVD detachment surrounded the church and arrested everyone leaving it. Two months later ten of them were executed, and most of the rest were sent to camps for five to ten years for taking part in an unregistered service.

According to an account of geologists camped near a Siberian camp in the summer of 1933, the guards led a group of priests to a freshly dug ditch and told them they would live if they denied God. The geologists watched from nearby tents as each priest in turn answered "God exists" and was shot, sixty times in all. In early 1934, three priests and two laypeople were taken from a special-regime camp at Kolyma to the local OGPU office and told to renounce their faith. Four of them refused and were shot at a freshly dug grave, and the fifth was ordered to bury them. In Poltava, all remaining clergy were arrested on the night of 26–27 February 1938, and their relatives were told they had been sentenced to "ten years without the right to correspond", a euphemism for execution.

In Kharkiv, the last functioning church was ordered in Lent of 1941 to pay a tax of 125,000 roubles, against an average annual wage of roughly 4,000 roubles. Despite the money being paid, the church was closed before Easter. A crowd of about 8,000 reportedly held an impromptu service in the square outside, singing the hymn "Glory to Thy Passion, O Lord!", and a larger crowd repeated it on Easter Sunday.

== Fabricated charges ==
Pospielovsky records several cases in which the charges against clergy were implausible. A bishop in Ryazan was arrested in 1935, with a priest and a deacon, for allegedly stealing 130 kg (287 lb) of silver. Bishop Dometian (Gorokhov) was tried in 1932 for black marketeering and for writing anti-Bolshevik leaflets in 1928. He was sentenced to death, commuted to eight years' imprisonment, and in 1937 may have been executed after being accused of organizing young people for espionage and terrorism.

A bishop of Ivanovo was accused of running a military espionage network made up of the girls in his church choir, although Ivanovo was a textile town of no military value. Ivanovo had seen strong protests against church closures in 1929–1930. Pospielovsky suggests that such accusations may have been meant to discourage people from associating with clergy or joining church choirs. The Renovationist Serafim (Ruzhentsov) was alleged to have led a spy network of monks and priests who held orgies at altars and raped and infected teenage girls. Metropolitan Evlogii in Paris was alleged to have directed a terrorist group in Leningrad, and Archbishop Venedikt (Plotnikov) of Kazan was executed in 1938 for allegedly leading a group of church terrorists and spies.

== Clergy who survived ==
Metropolitan Nikolai of Rostov-on-Don was exiled without trial to Kazakhstan, where exiled clergy lived in clay huts and ate grass to survive. He returned in 1934 and was re-arrested and condemned to death in 1938. After being shot and dumped in a mass grave, he was found alive by believers who took him away and cared for him in secret. He served as metropolitan under the German occupation and left for Romania with the retreating Germans, and his later fate is unknown.

Bishop Manuil (Lemeshevsky) of Leningrad had won back most of Petrograd's parishes from the Renovationists in the early 1920s. He was arrested in 1923, exiled to Siberia in 1933, and arrested again in 1940 and sentenced to ten years' hard labour for spreading religious propaganda among youth. After his release in 1945 he became Archbishop of Orenburg and was arrested again in 1948. He was released in 1955 and died in 1968 aged 83, as Metropolitan of Kuibyshev. His survival was unusual among the bishops of his generation.

Bishop Luka (Luke Voyno-Yasenetsky) was a surgeon and a founder of Tashkent University. He was imprisoned in 1923 on charges of treasonous foreign ties and exiled to Yeniseysk, then to Arkhangelsk in 1927. After his arrest in 1937 he was tortured for two years, including beatings, interrogations lasting weeks and food deprivation, in attempts to make him sign confessions. He was then deported to Siberia. In 1941 his expertise in treating infected wounds led the state to make him chief surgeon at a military hospital in Krasnoyarsk. He became archbishop of Tambov after the war and received the Stalin Prize in 1946 for his book on infected wounds, donating the prize money to war orphans.

Bishop Afanasii (Sakharov), vicar-bishop of the Vladimir archdiocese, was consecrated in 1921 and spent no more than two and a half years performing episcopal duties between then and 1954. He refused offers of being left alone if he retired, opposed the 1927 declaration of loyalty, and was imprisoned or exiled at least a dozen times, mostly without formal indictment. He was released in 1954 and died in 1962.

The monk Sampson, a physician who had converted from Anglicanism, survived a mass execution in 1918 by being wounded and covered by other bodies. He was arrested again in 1929 and 1936, served as a prison doctor in Central Asia, and escaped when the authorities refused to release him in 1946. He did pastoral work without legal papers and died in 1979. Bishop Stefan (Nikitin), a physician, survived the camps as a camp doctor and allowed exhausted prisoners to recuperate in the hospital. When the authorities threatened him with a new trial, he reportedly called on a woman in Penza named Matrionushka to pray for him. The trial did not happen and he was released weeks later. She was later arrested and died in a Moscow prison.

== See also ==
- Marxist–Leninist atheism
- Persecution of Christians in the Soviet Union
- Persecution of Christians in Warsaw Pact countries
- Soviet anti-religious legislation
- The Mores of the Russian Clergy
- USSR anti-religious campaign (1917–1921)
- USSR anti-religious campaign (1921–1928)
- USSR anti-religious campaign (1958–1964)
- USSR anti-religious campaign (1970s–1990)
