= Akilov =

Akilov (masculine, Russian: Акилов) or Akilova (feminine, Russian: Акилова) is a Russian surname. It originates either from the old-Russian nickname Akul (meaning crook, deceiver) or from the Greek given name Aquila (Ἀκύλας). Notable people with the surname include:

- Kirill Akilov (born 1989), Russian football player
- Natalya Akilova (born 1993), Kazakhstani volleyball player
- Rakhmat Akilov, perpetrator of the 2017 Stockholm truck attack

== See also ==
- Akulov
- Okulov
