= Okulov =

Okulov (Russian: Окулов) is a Russian masculine surname, its feminine counterpart is Okulova. The surname originates either from the old-Russian nickname Okul (meaning shark, eagle) or from the Greek given name Aquila (Ἀκύλας). It may refer to

- Aleksandr Okulov (1908–1993), Russian philosopher
- Artem Okulov (born 1994), Russian weightlifter
- Konstantin Okulov (born 1995), Russian ice hockey player
- Valery Okulov (born 1952), Deputy Minister of Transport of the Russian Federation

== See also ==
- Akulov
