= The Institute for Research of social awareness and scientific atheism of Czechoslovak Academy of Sciences =

The Institute for Research of social awareness and scientific atheism CSAS (Czech: Ústav pro výzkum společenského vědomí a vědeckého ateismu Československé akademie věd) was established on 1 July 1983 by merging the Department of scientific atheism of CSAS and Psychological Laboratory CSAS, became the center of scientific activities of Czechoslovak Academy of Sciences (CSAS) in the field of scientific atheism and philosophy, sociological and psychological studies of social and individual consciousness. In 1990 it was renamed the Department of social consciousness Academy.

Director of the institute was Ivan Hodovský.
