= Atheistic Dictionary =

- Original title: Атеистический словарь
- Language: Russian
- Genre: Religion, Atheism, Dictionary
- Published: 1983 (1st), 1985 (2nd), 1986 (3rd)
- Publication place: Soviet Union
- Pages: 512

Atheistic Dictionary (Russian: Атеисти́ческий слова́рь) is a one-volume reference work devoted to various aspects of religion and atheism. It contains more than 2,500 terms.

== History of creation ==
The dictionary was the result of many years of cooperation of scientists from various scientific and educational institutions of the USSR and the socialist countries. It was based on the word list, compiled by the candidate of historical sciences V.F. Zybkovets with V.V. Zybkovets, which has been widely discussed by the scientific community of Moscow, Leningrad and Kiev — Institute of Scientific Atheism Academy of Social Sciences under the CPSU Central Committee and its Kiev branch, Department of history and theory of scientific atheism, Moscow State University named after Lomonosov, Department of history and theory of scientific atheism KSU named after Taras Shevchenko, Department of scientific atheism, ethics and aesthetics Herzen University. The final wordlist was I. N. Yablokov.

== Literature ==
- Аринин Е. И. [in Russian] (2014). Философия религии:Академическое введение в основные концепции и термины. Учеб. пособие. Вып. 1 (100 экз ed.). Владимир: Владим. гос. ун-т. p. 13.
- "Авторы словаря". Атеистический словарь (2-е изд., испр. и доп, 200000 экз ed.). М.: Политиздат. 1985. p. 512 – via Абдусамедов А. И., Алейник Р. М., Алиева Б. А. и др.; Под общ. ред. М. П. Новикова.
- "Предисловие". Атеистический словарь (2-е изд., испр. и доп, 200000 экз ed.). М.: Политиздат. 1985. p. 3 – via Абдусамедов А. И., Алейник Р. М., Алиева Б. А. и др.; Под общ. ред. М. П. Новикова.
- Яблоков И. Н. [in Russian] (2010). "Вехи истории". 50 лет кафедре философии религии и религиоведения философского факультета МГУ им. М. В. Ломоносова (PDF). М.: Издатель А. В. Воробьёв. pp. 5–14. ISBN 978-5-93883-106-3 – via Под общ. ред. З. П. Трофимовой, И. Н. Яблокова.
