= Scientific atheism =

Scientific atheism may refer to:

- Marxist–Leninist atheism, a communist doctrine and philosophical science formerly promoted in the Eastern Bloc
- New Atheism, a 21st-century atheist movement
- Relationship between religion and science, more general discussion
