= Aquilla =

Aquilla may refer to:

== Places ==
United States

- Aquilla, Alabama, an unincorporated community in Washington County, Alabama
- Aquilla, Missouri
- Aquilla, Ohio
- Aquilla, Texas

== People with the surname ==
- Adelaide Aquilla, American track and field athlete

== People with the given name ==
- Aquilla B. Caldwell (1814–1893), Attorney General of West Virginia
- Aquilla Smith (1806–1890), Irish physician and scholar
- Aquilla Wren (1787–1844), American businessman and land owner

== Other uses ==
- Aquilla, a character in the wargame Heroscape

== See also ==
- Aquila (disambiguation)
