= Aquilla Wren =

American politician (1787–1844)

County commissioner
- In office 1832–1836

Personal details
- Born: 1787
- Died: 1844 (aged 56–57)

Wren v Wren
- Court: Peoria County Circuit Court
- Started: September 1843
- Decided: June 17, 1844

Wren v. Moss et al
- Court: Illinois Supreme Court
- Decided: December 22, 1845

Case opinions
- Decision by: Walter B. Scates

Aquilla Wren (1787–1844) was a businessman and land owner in Peoria, Illinois in the 1830s and 1840s. He and his wife came of note beyond Peoria as a result of a sensational divorce proceeding in which Abraham Lincoln was involved.

After Aquilla Wren divorced Clarissa (Jones) Wren, she pursued an alimony payment from him despite significant cultural and legal obstacles. Even after Aquilla Wren died during the course of the proceedings, Clarissa Wren continued the case, which eventually wound up in the Illinois Supreme Court. Lincoln seems to have come into the case late in the term of court when he assisted Elihu H. Powell and William F. Bryan in their efforts to obtain a new trial.

== Pre-divorce ==
Aquilla Wren was born in 1787; his wife was born as Clarissa Jones in 1781. They married in Jackson County, Ohio, in January 1826. They moved to Springfield, Illinois in 1829, then to Peoria in 1830.

In Peoria, Aquilla Wren became an important merchant and landowner. He was elected a county commissioner in 1832, and again in 1836. He was elected a town trustee and assessor for Peoria in 1841.

By 1834 he owned a steamboat ferry to cross the Illinois River to Tazewell County. In 1835, he became one of the original 24 commissioners of the State Bank of Illinois. By the 1840s, in addition to the ferry and the money-lending business, he also owned a store and a sawmill.

== Divorce proceedings ==
=== Circuit court ===
In 1843, Aquilla Wren hired lawyers Norman H. Purple, future Illinois Supreme Court justice; George T. Metcalfe; and Onslow Peters, who later became a judge on the 16th Circuit of Illinois. In September 1843, Wren filed for divorce in Peoria County Circuit Court.

Aquilla Wren accused his wife of committing adultery with four men in the year the couple lived in Springfield, of committing adultery with his Peoria store clerk Jacob Darst, of peeping through a keyhole to "see a young man undress and go to bed", and of asking a neighbor where another man "got his skin now that his wife was dead". Aquilla Wren further accused his wife of telling others that she wanted to "ruin" him, that she "could stand over him and see him draw his last breath with pleasure," and that she wanted his brother to die as well.

On September 4, 1843, the circuit clerk issued a summons for Clarissa Wren to appear in court on October 16, 1843. Clarissa Wren proceeded to hire local law partners William F. Bryan and Elihu N. Powell, who also later became a judge of the state 16th Circuit, and law partners Stephen T. Logan and future U.S. president Abraham Lincoln from Springfield. Lincoln charged $150 for his services.

Aquilla Wren was granted a decree after a finding by a jury that his wife Clarissa had been guilty of misconduct.

On June 17, 1844, Peoria County Circuit Court issued a ruling on the divorce case. Caton ordered that the marriage be dissolved, but the court postponed its ruling on Clarissa's alimony claim.

==== Aquilla's death ====
On August 14, 1844, Aquilla Wren died of fever. An executor sold Aquilla's land, but Clarissa had not released her right of dower. Attorneys argued that according to Illinois statute, a wife divorced for fault or misconduct lost those rights.

On October 16, 1844, Lincoln filed a motion to abate the case due to Aquilla's death, but withdrew the motion and instead filed a bill of exceptions.

During the course of the case, Clarissa Wren married Amaziah Hart in Peoria. Because of the doctrine of coverture, in which the wife's legal personality was subsumed into that of her husband, Amaziah Hart became a party to the case.

=== Illinois Supreme Court ===
During the December 1844 term of the Illinois Supreme Court, Lincoln filed a transcript from the circuit court and requested Clarissa's case be placed on the docket concerning her property rights.

On December 22, 1845, Justice Walter B. Scates wrote the opinion for the 7–1 majority (Justice Richard M. Young dissented). On December 29, the attorneys for Moss, Frye, and Thomas Wren filed a petition for rehearing, which the court denied.

== Legacy ==
Between 1839 and 1861, Lincoln or his legal partners were involved in seventeen similar cases where husbands sued their wives and accused them of adultery.

== See also ==
- Divorce in the United States
- Marriage in the United States
