= Aquilia =

Aquilia or Aquillia may refer to:

- Aquilia Severa, wife of the ancient Roman emperor Elagabalus
- Lex Aquilia, ancient Roman law which provided compensation to the owners of property injured by someone's fault
- Aquillia gens, a family in ancient Rome

== See also ==
- Aquila (disambiguation)
- Aquileia, an ancient Roman city in Italy, at the head of the Adriatic
