= Ivan Hodovský =

Ivan Hodovský (March 13, 1938 in Brno – April 8, 2009) was a Czech Marxist and former director of the Department of scientific atheism of Czechoslovak Academy of Sciences in Brno. He graduated in 1956 in Blansko and then learn history and philosophy at the Masaryk University. In 1976 he became a candidate of sciences, associate professor in 1986.

Since 1964 to 1970 he worked as a lecturer at the Faculty of Arts in Brno, from 1970 to 1990 he was a researcher at the Department of scientific atheism of Czechoslovak Academy of Sciences, since 1982 to 1990 he was its director. After 1990, he moved to Filozofická Fakulta (FF) at the Masarykova Univerzita and from 1994 he also teaches at the Faculty of Education at Palacky University in Olomouc.
