= Akulov =

Akulov (masculine, Russian: Акулов) or Akulova (feminine, Russian: Акулова) is a Russian surname. The surname Akulov is of Russian origin, and its meaning can be traced to various possible roots within Russian language and culture:

Derived from the Word "Akula" (Shark):

The surname may originate from the Russian word "акула" (akula), meaning "shark." This could reflect traits such as strength, sharpness, or fierceness associated with the animal

. Patronymic Origin:

In Russian, the suffix "-ov" indicates "belonging to" or "descendant of." Akulov could imply "son of Akul," with Akul being a diminutive or nickname, possibly from older Slavic names or traits

. Connection to the Name Aquila:

The name may also have roots in the Greek word "Aquila" (Ἀκύλας), meaning "eagle." This association could reflect noble or aspirational qualities

. Cultural and Regional Influence:

Russian surnames often reflect familial, geographical, or characteristic origins. Akulov may have originated in regions where animal-derived surnames (like Sokolov from falcon) were common

. This surname structure is typical in Russia, where names often carry familial or symbolic significance.. Notable people with the surname include:

- Dinara Akulova (born 1964), Kyrgyz singer
- Igor Akulov (1897–1937), Russian Orthodox monk and Eastern Catholic priest
- Ivan Akulov (1888–1937), Soviet politician
- Marina Akulova (born 1985), Russian volleyball player
- Varya Akulova (born 1992), Ukrainian strongwoman
- Yevgeny Akulov (1905–1996), Soviet conductor

== See also ==
- Okulov
