= Aquilinus =

Aquilinus may refer to the following people:

- Aquilinus, a pagan commander confronted by Pancras of Taormina (died c. 40 AD)
- Aquilinus of Milan or Aquilinus of Cologne (died 1015), martyr
- Aquilinus of Évreux (c. 620–695), Frankish bishop and hermit
- Aquilinus, sometime Bishop of Colonia Agrippina before 248 AD
- Aquilinus of Fossombrone (5th century)
- Aquilinus (589–599), sometime Bishop of Vic
- Aquilinus (c. 430–c. 470), a nobleman of Lyon, father of St Viventiolus and St Rusticus
- Titus Herminius Aquilinus (died 498 BC), a hero of the Roman Republic
- Lucius Titius Epidius Aquilinus, consul in 125 AD
  - Lucius Titius Plautius Aquilinus, consul in 162 AD, probably his son
- Lars Herminius Aquilinus, Roman consul in 448 BC
