= Department of scientific atheism of Czechoslovak Academy of Sciences =

Department of scientific atheism of Czechoslovak Academy of Sciences (Czech: Ústav vědeckého ateismu Československé akademie věd) was one of the institutes of the Czechoslovak Academy of Sciences. The Institute was formed by reorganizing the former Institute for Academy of Philosophy. Engaged in the research contemporary forms of religiosity and the development of the theory of scientific atheism. In 1983, together with the psychological laboratory of CSAS in Brno converted at the Institute for Research of social awareness and scientific atheism Academy.

== Literature ==
- Vědecký ateismus [kol. vědeckých pracovníků pod vedením Ivana Hodovského]. 2. přeprac. vyd. Praha : Státní pedagogické nakladatelství, 1976. 348 s. (Knižnice výuky marxismu-leninismu), schváleno jako příručka pro studium vědeckého ateismu na vysokých školách. (v době do r. 1989) (in Czech)
- K aktuálním otázkám vědeckého ateismu. Jiří Loukotka, Milan Daňhel, Karel Hlavoň, Ivan Hodovský. 1. vyd. Praha : Horizont, 1974. 125 s.
- Jiří Loukotka: Za pravdu marxismu-leninismu (výbor ze statí a článků). 1. vyd. Brno : Blok, 1979. 239 s. (in Czech)
- Základy komunistické výchovy v rodině : (podle zásad V.A. Suchomlinského). Jiří Loukotka, Lada Slováková. 1. vyd. Praha : Státní pedagogické nakladatelství, 1977. 132 s. (Rodičům o výchově dětí; sv. 51) (in Czech)
