= USSR anti-religious campaign (1928–1941) =

Stalinist USSR's promotion of state atheism

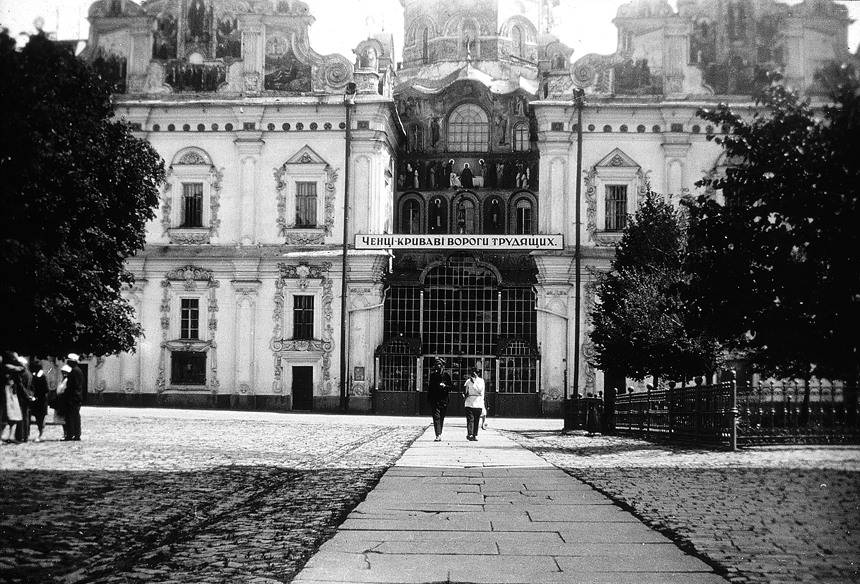
"Monks are bloody enemies of the working people" (banner on the Dormition Cathedral of the Kiev Cave Monastery, 1930s)

The USSR anti-religious campaign of 1928–1941 was a new phase of anti-religious campaign in the Soviet Union following the anti-religious campaign of 1921–1928. The campaign began in 1929, with the drafting of new legislation that severely prohibited religious activities and called for an education process on religion in order to further disseminate atheism and materialist philosophy. This had been preceded in 1928 at the fifteenth Party congress, where Joseph Stalin criticized the party for failure to produce more active and persuasive anti-religious propaganda. This new phase coincided with the beginning of the mass collectivization of agriculture and the nationalization of the few remaining private enterprises.

The main target of the anti-religious campaign in the 1920s and 1930s was the Russian Orthodox Church, which had the largest number of faithful. Nearly all of its clergy, and a number of its believers, were shot or sent to labour camps. Theological schools were closed, and church publications were prohibited. Only a twelfth of the Russian Orthodox Church's priests were left functioning in their parishes by 1941.

In the period between 1927 and 1940, the number of Orthodox Churches in the Russian Republic fell from 29,584 to less than 500 due to systematic demolitions of the churches and cathedrals.

The campaign slowed down in the late 1930s and early 1940s, and came to an abrupt end after the commencement of Operation Barbarossa and the Invasion of Poland. The challenge produced by the German invasion would ultimately prevent the public withering away of religion in Soviet society.

This campaign, like the campaigns of other periods that formed the basis of the USSR's efforts to eliminate religion and replace it with atheism supported with a materialist world view, was accompanied with official claims that there was no religious persecution in the USSR, and that believers who were being targeted were for other reasons. Believers were in fact being widely targeted and persecuted for their belief or promotion of religion, as part of the state's campaign to disseminate atheism, but officially the state claimed that no such persecution existed and that the people being targeted—when they admitted that people were being targeted—were only being attacked for resistance to the state or breaking the law. This guise served Soviet propaganda abroad, where it tried to promote a better image of itself especially in light of the great criticism against it from foreign religious influences.

== Education ==
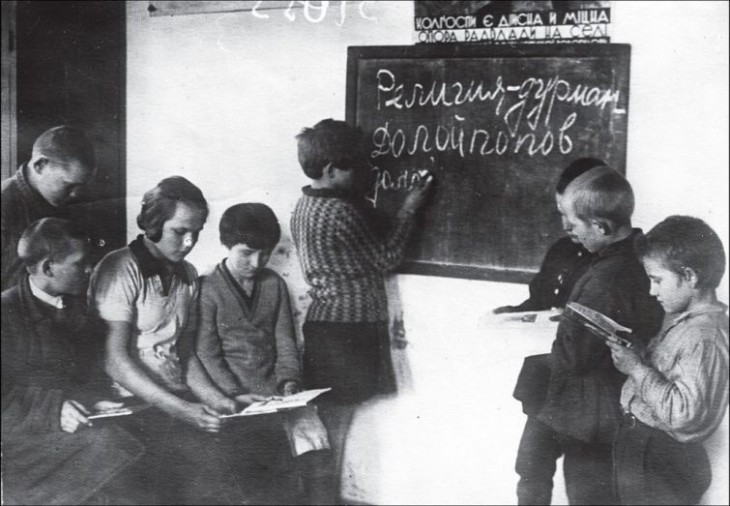
Schoolchildren writing anti-religious slogans for Easter in Kharkiv, April 1931

In 1928 the Soviet People's Commissar for Education, Anatoly Lunacharsky, pressured by leftist Marxists, agreed to an entirely anti-religious education system from the first grade up, however, he still warned against a general expulsion of teachers with religious beliefs due to the shortage of atheist teachers. In 1929 an Agitprop conference resolved to intensify anti-religious work throughout the education system. This led to the setting-up of anti-religious sections at all research and higher-education teaching institutions. A special anti-religious faculty was instituted at the Institute of Red Professors in 1929.

In 1927 during an interview with the American labor delegation, Joseph Stalin affirmed that the party could not be neutral towards religion:

There are cases when some of the party members sometimes interfere with the all-out deployment of anti-religious propaganda. If such members of the Party are expelled, then it is very good, because such "Communists" have no place in the ranks of our Party." – Joseph Stalin

A campaign was led against schoolteachers of the old intelligentsia who were asserted to be working against the system and were even allowing priests to spiritually influence schoolchildren. Teachers accused of such could be fired, and in most cases the Soviet authorities imprisoned or exiled them.

The antireligious press identified by name believers among the ranks of top Soviet scholars. This labeling led to the 1929–1930 purge of the Academy of Sciences of the Soviet Union, in which up to 100 scholars, their assistants and graduate students were arrested on forged charges and given sentences that ranged from three years of internal exile to the death penalty. Most of them subsequently perished in camps or in prison. One of the aims of this purge was to take away the church's intellectuals and to assist the propaganda that only backward people believed in God.

In one instance the famous Soviet historian Sergei Platonov was asked why he appointed a Jew named Kaplan to the directorship of the Pushkin House, and he replied saying that Kaplan was not a Jew but an Orthodox Christian; on this basis Kaplan was sent to a concentration camp for five years.

The Central Committee called off "administrative measures" against religion from 1930 to 1931, which weakened the anti-religious educational work, but another resolution in September 1931 re-instituted active anti-religious education.

== Sergii and the Church ==
Most of the bishops arrested between 1928 and 1932 were arrested for reasons surrounding opposition to Metropolitan Sergius and his notorious declaration of loyalty. The state did officially maintain the line that church and state were separate in the Soviet Union during this time, despite the multiple arrests of people for not following their religious leaders. The GPU often cynically questioned arrested believers "what is your attitude to 'our' Metropolitan Sergii, heading the Soviet church?".

Opposition to Sergius was used as a pretext to close multiple churches and sending clergy to exile. The last officially functioning anti-Sergiite church in Moscow was closed in 1933 and in Leningrad in 1936. After these churches were closed, they were usually demolished or turned to secular use (rather than being given to Sergii's jurisdiction as though they were really being closed simply for the reason of their opposition to Sergii). This campaign greatly diminished the number of functioning churches in the country.

Although officially anti-Sergiite churches were destroyed, multiple unofficial underground church communities existed and formed what was called 'The Catacomb Church'. This underground church movement claimed to be the true legitimate continuation of Orthodoxy in Russia.

Twenty percent of inmates at the Solovki camps in 1928–1929 were imprisoned in connection with these affairs. Between 1928 and 1931, at least thirty-six bishops were imprisoned and exiled, and the total number surpassed 150 by the end of 1930. This did not mean, however, that clergy loyal to Sergii were safer for they were also widely attacked and arrested.

Metropolitan Sergii told foreign press in 1930 that there was no religious persecution and that Christianity shared multiple social goals with Marxism. A large number of clergy had made peace with Sergii by 1930.

Due to the massive number of bishops being arrested, both the Orthodox and the Renovationists consecrated bishops secretly who could take the place of arrested bishops and continue the apostolic lineage. Also as a result of this massive arrest of bishops, the Orthodox Holy Synod ceased functioning in 1935.

According to the anti-religious press, priests would wander from village to village surreptitiously performing religious services in the homes of believers, while being disguised as wandering repairmen, or some other profession. It also claimed the young people were being attracted to Christianity by clergy who hired themselves out free of charge to youth parties as games organizers, musicians, choir directors, readers of secular Russian literature, drama-circle directors, etc. It also claimed that multiple believers were keeping themselves away from churches and priests due to shame of observing religious ritual overtly, and that in response to this multiple priests performed religious rituals in absentia; this meant that marriage ceremonies were performed over rings that were then sent to absent bride and groom, or that funeral services were performed over empty coffins in which the corpse was later laid in a secular funeral.

== Legislative measures ==
The League of Militant Godless called for sectarians to be expelled from farm management in 1929.

In 1929 Lunacharsky, made some statements in which he claimed that religious freedom could be suspended "when it is abused for the direct class struggle against the proletarian dictatorship". While Lunacharsky had urged moderation, this quotation would be taken out of context in order to justify the intense anti-religious persecution carried out in the next decade.

The church's successful competition with the ongoing and widespread atheistic propaganda, prompted new laws to be adopted in 1929 on "Religious Associations" as well as amendments to the constitution, which forbade all forms of public, social, communal, educational, publishing or missionary activities for religious believers. The Church thereby lost any public voice and was limited strictly to religious services that took place in the walls of churches. Atheist propaganda continued to have an unlimited right of propagation, which meant that the Church could not respond to the arguments used against it any longer. The Church was not permitted to run study groups for religious adults, organize picnics or cultural circles, or organize special services for groups of believers, such as schoolchildren, youth, women or mothers. Any pursuit of the true pastoral duties by clergymen became punishable by law. These laws also forbade Christian charity efforts, participation of children in religious activities, and religious functionaries were restricted to the area associated with them.

Young Pioneer organizations were urged to participate in the anti-religious struggle by the 16th party congress. The same congress also made it illegal for children to serve as acolytes in churches or to be drawn into groups for home religious instruction.

The official explanation for this campaign was that the state was vulnerable due to foreign religious efforts (e.g. the Vatican, US evangelical churches) and that therefore the churches in Russia needed to be deprived of all public rights with the exception of liturgical services conducted within church walls. All of these regulations together made it much easier for the state to arbitrarily persecute clergy and their families, especially with regard to the discriminatory financial, land use and housing regulations.

In 1929 the Soviet calendar was changed to replace the seven-day work week with a six-day one, with five days of work and the sixth day off; this was done in order to force people to work on Sunday instead of going to church. The Soviet leadership instituted measures to stop the celebration of Christmas and other religious feasts. For example, the 25th and 26 December were proclaimed "Days of Industrialization" in which the whole country was obligated to celebrate national industrialization by being at work for the whole day. High work absenteeism on religious feast days was reported throughout the 1930s, however. Workers that did go to church services on working Sundays or on such religious feast days could be punished for truancy. The new work week remained in effect until 1940.

The celebration of the traditional Russian holiday of New Year (Feast of the Circumcision of Christ) was prohibited (later on New Year was reinstated as a secular holiday and is now the most significant family holiday in Russia). Gatherings and religious processions were initially prohibited and later on strictly limited and regulated.

In later years, a more subtle method of disrupting Christian holidays involved broadcasting popular movies one after the other on the major holidays when believers are expected to participate in religious processions, especially during the Easter celebration. Apparently, this was intended to keep those whose faith was uncertain or wavering in their homes and glued to their TVs.

In 1929 a resolution of the CPSU central committee called on the Komsomol to eliminate religious prejudices from its membership through mandatory "voluntary political education" (note: this is not a typo, "voluntary" did not mean allowing refusal to participate in Soviet legislative jargon). Coercive pressure was applied to members of trade unions and local party cells to join the League of the Militant Godless. In 1930, the 16th party congress mentioned the duty of the party to help "the emancipation of the masses from the reactionary influence of religion" and called on trade unions to "correctly organize and strengthen anti-religious propaganda".

The party adopted a resolution at its 16th congress (1930) that priests should not be invited to private homes, donations to churches should discontinue, and that trade unions should be pressured not to perform any work for churches (including building repairs). It also called upon the unions to boost anti-religious propaganda.

== Financial persecution ==
The church was treated as a private enterprise and clergy qualified as kulaks for taxation purposes, and they were subject to the same oppressive taxation that was introduced for private peasants and shopkeepers (up to 81% of income). The lack of regulations that defined how such should be assessed allowed for arbitrary assessments and financial persecution. The rural clergy were required to pay the full tax on land use, along with tax on income received for special clerical functions as well as a special tax paid by those deprived of voting rights (all clergy were in this category). All church communities were required to pay a special tax on the leased church building at 0.5% of the "market" value of the building, which would be arbitrarily assessed by the State Insurance Office. Furthermore, clergy and conscientious objectors had to pay a special tax for not serving in the armed forces, but still had to serve in special auxiliary forces (felling trees, mining, and doing other labour) when called upon. This tax was equal to 50% of the income tax on incomes under 3000 rubles and 75% of the income tax on incomes greater than 3000 rubles. Through all of these taxes combined, the taxes charged to clergy could exceed 100% of their income. Failure to pay taxes could be criminally prosecuted and lead to imprisonment or exile in Siberia. Failure to pay taxes could also be treated as a subversive activity to undermine the Soviet economy during the Five Year Plan and could lead to execution.

Clergy were deprived of any social security rights as well. Up until 1929, the Church could insure their clergy for medical care and for pension by paying required sums, but after this date all such sums were to be kept by the state and no insurance or pension would be issued including to clergy who were already retired. This caused clergy to be only served by doctors who could charge as much as they wanted.

Since the church had been deprived of property in 1918, and the clergy had no fields to till as a result, along with the facts that the wealthier members of their congregation were being liquidated and the clergy were still forbidden to collect membership dues, they often no longer had a financial base to maintain their churches.

Discriminatory land use policies had been introduced prior to 1929, which made it such that clergy who wanted land plots for private cultivation needed special permission and that this permission could only be given if no one else requested the land for use, and if such a request did arise the state could confiscate the land from the clergyman and give it to the person who requested it. The clergy also had no priority in claim to the land that belonged to the Church prior to 1917. In 1928 it was made illegal for clergy to join co-operative and collective farms. In addition there were no laws that limited the rights of local governments to refuse land plots to clergy arbitrarily. All of this legislation contributed to a situation in which the clergy had no land to cultivate.

Clerical housing began to be rented at 10% of their commercial value in 1929 (in comparison to 1–2% for others living in the same type of building). Clergy that had annual income surpassing 3000 rubles could not remain in nationalized or municipalized buildings and they had to be evicted by April 8, 1929. No further leases of such buildings to clergy of any income were permitted, and it was also made illegal for them to reside in the homes of others. The only way they could live then was in private houses that they rented, of which after the collectivization nothing remained except semi-rural cottages. In the context of the persecution few laypeople would offer such housing to clergy out of fear of reprisal. This lack of housing forced a number of priests to leave their vocation and take civilian jobs.

Priests' wives could nominally divorce their husbands in order to get jobs to support their families. Priests could be seen in rags in front of churches begging for alms and reportedly it could occur where priests had to mount the pulpit wearing their underclothes for lack of any other clothing that they owned.

== Antireligious propaganda ==
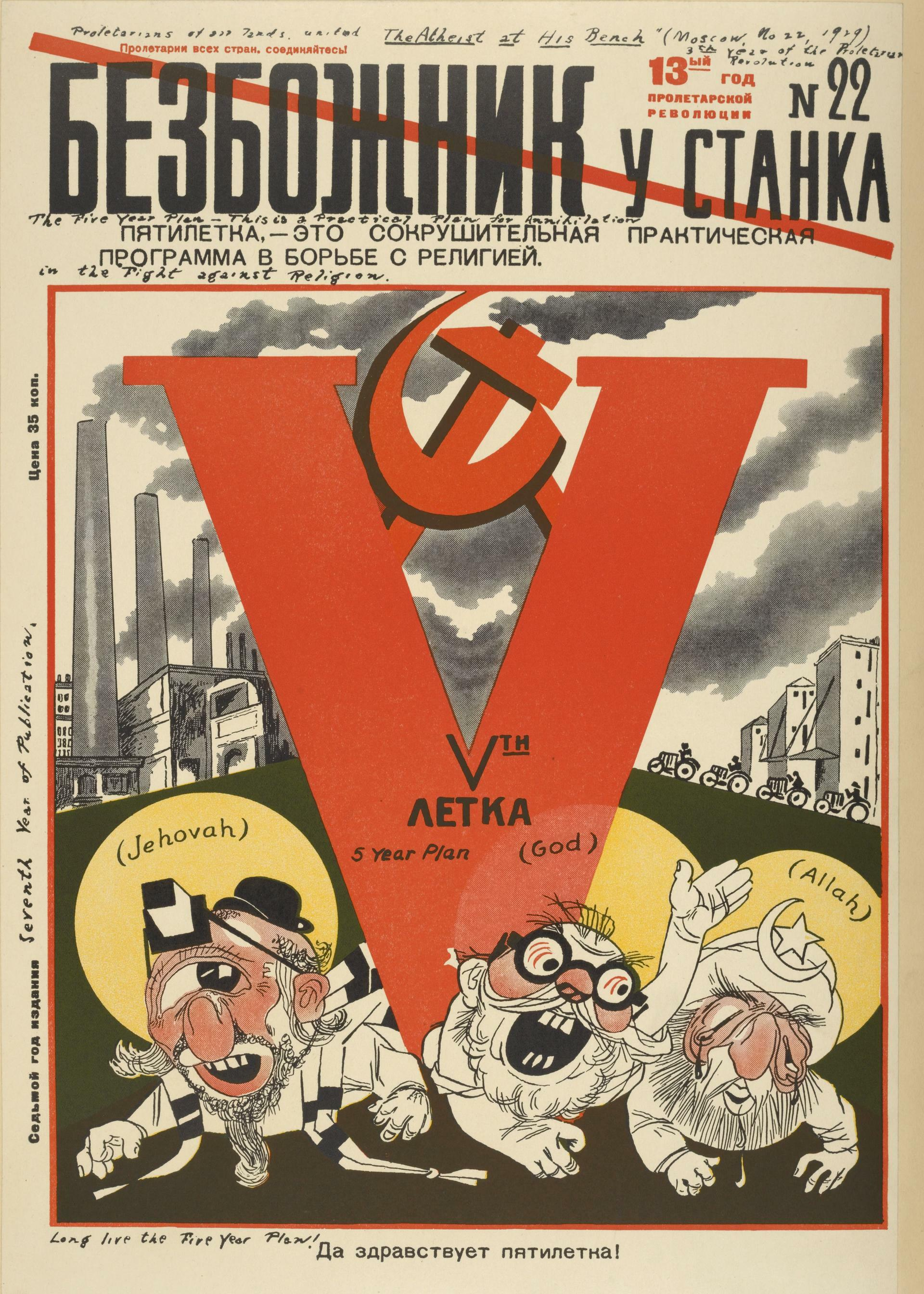
Cover of Bezbozhnik u Stanka in 1929, magazine of the Society of the Godless. The first five-year plan of the Soviet Union is shown crushing the gods of the Abrahamic religions.

The antireligious propaganda was critical in order to demonize active believers and foster a mindset of hostility against them as 'vermin' or 'scum', and it was in some ways similar to the contemporary anti-Semitic propaganda of Nazi Germany. Creating this mindset was critical in order to make the public accept the campaign.

The published anti-religious propaganda was not as conspicuous as it was during the 1920s, but this did not bear reflection on the level of actual persecution. The verbal propaganda was increasingly relegated to public organizations, such as party branches, the Komsomol, the Young Pioneers, the League of the Militant Godless, Museums of Scientific Atheism, Workers' Evening Universities of Atheism under the auspices of Trade Unions, and others.

All forms of behaviour and policies of the Churches were treated in the official propaganda as insincere and aiming to overthrow Communism (including both believers that were pro-soviet and anti-soviet). Even acts of loyalty by religious leaders to the system were considered to be insincere attempts to curry favour in order to retain their influence over the believers and protect religion from its final liquidation as the sworn enemy of the workers.

Religious behaviour was presented in the official propaganda as being linked to psychological disorders and even criminal behaviour. Textbooks for schoolchildren tried to evoke contempt for believers; pilgrims were depicted as morons, repulsive-looking alcoholics, syphilitics, plain cheaters and money-grubbing clergy. Believers were treated as harmful parasites that spread ignorance, filth and disease, and which needed to be liquidated.

The press relayed slogans like "let us deal a crushing blow to religion!" or "we must achieve liquidation of the Church and complete liquidation of religious superstitions!". Religious belief was presented as superstitious and backward. It often printed pictures of former churches that had been demolished or turned into other uses.

The official press instructed people to sacrifice their family ties for the sake of atheism, and that they should not make compromises with family religious tradition for the sake of family unity or loving pity for their relatives.

The anti-religious propaganda attempted to show a relationship between religious belief and immoral or criminal behaviour. This included a revision of Russian history, in which religious figures were condemned. Fr Gapon, the leader of the Bloody Sunday March in January 1905 who was praised by Lenin, was turned into a Japanese spy, and Patriarch Tikhon was alleged to have been affiliated with British capitalists.

The massive man-made famine in the early 1930s was blamed on religious believers who supposedly were infiltrating the collective farms and wrecking them from within. They were blamed in similar ways for the failures of the Soviet economy in the 1930s. Religious festivals were also blamed for hurting the economy by introducing high work absenteeism and drunkenness.

Crimes were invented in the press against religious believers that corresponded with their arrest. Accusations of lechery and Sexually transmitted disease were used against clergy wherever possible, since the propaganda maintained that the only reason why an intellectual would become a priest would be by moral decline and dishonesty in order to exploit people. Black marketing was one of the easiest accusations to put against believers, because after the abolition of the New Economic Policy the sale of a cross or icon could be categorized as illegal private enterprise, since the state did not produce these.

Under the USSR's policy of denying the existence of religious persecution, the press only admitted the existence of persecution in the past during the Russian Civil War and during the campaign to seize church valuables, and this was justified by claiming that the Church was conducting counter-revolutionary activities. Under the same policy, it was claimed that the mass closure of churches represented a voluntary decline in religion of the population (and closed supposedly as a result of demands of the workers). These claims were contradicted even before 1929, by cases of thousands of believers who petitioned the government to open churches that had been 'voluntarily' closed. Decades later, Soviet writers would admit the existence of persecution in the 1930s. The fact that less than 1% of the churches used in 1917 were available for believers by 1939 when they still numbered at least 50% of the population also is cited as proof against the supposed voluntary closures.

The anti-religious press lost much creativity in the 1930s and often regurgitated the same routine of hate propaganda from publication to publication along with drab articles that praised state policies or called on people to be good citizens. It also tended to exaggerate the success of eliminating religion and claimed that the state had dealt it a mortal blow.

In the hostile climate of the time, believers were named and exposed in the atheist press. Those who attended church at Easter could be reported by name. Such reporting could precede further attacks against them. Students at public schools could be asked to write on the blackboard the names of fellow students that had been attending religious services. Students were given homework assignments to try to convert a member of their family to atheism.

== Muslims ==
Sultan Galiev, the Central Asian Marxist leader who had advocated for an independent Marxist state in Central Asia, began to be attacked in 1927. From 1927 to 1940 he and his supporters were purged from the CPSU. Galiev was arrested and sent to penal servitude; he was later executed in 1940. A number of Muslims who had supported a united Muslim state in Central Asia were targeted and liquidated in the 1930s as traitors.

Much of the communist party in Central Asia was composed of believing Muslims, and the state found that it was not pragmatic to eliminate all of them, because of the lack of experience that Russian communist replacements had with Central Asia and the shortage of sufficient numbers of atheist members of the CPSU in those territories.

Muslims nevertheless were attacked along with the believers of other religions during this period. The 1929 law on religious associations for the whole country was implemented in Central Asia by the dissolution of all Islamic courts that oversaw rulings on both Sharia and customary law.

There were 20,000 mosques in Soviet Central Asia in 1917, fewer than 4,000 in 1929 and by 1935 it is known that there were less than 60 still functioning in Uzbekistan, which held half of the Muslim population of Central Asia. Muslim clerics encountered the same financial persecution as Christian clergy, and were unable to support themselves. There was also a massive decrease in the number of registered Muslim clergy, which left significant amounts of areas without imams or mullahs. A number of unregistered Muslim clerics continued to practise illegally, however, as well as multiple Muslim mosques existed illegally without registration. The unregistered mosques along with the registered ones, still represented a tiny fraction of the number of mosques in the region of Central Asia in 1917.

Many Muslim clerics were arrested and executed during Stalin's purges. The campaign against Islam in the 1930s was directly linked with the physical annihilation of the "Islamic" nationalistic communists of the Central Asian parts of the USSR. In 1936 there was an "unmasking" of the supreme Muslim Mufti of Ufa as a Japanese and German agent who had turned the entire Muslim Spiritual Administration of Ufa into a giant espionage network. In some parts of the Caucasus, the anti-religious campaign and attacks against Islam provoked guerrilla warfare that Soviet troops were brought in to suppress.

== Activities ==
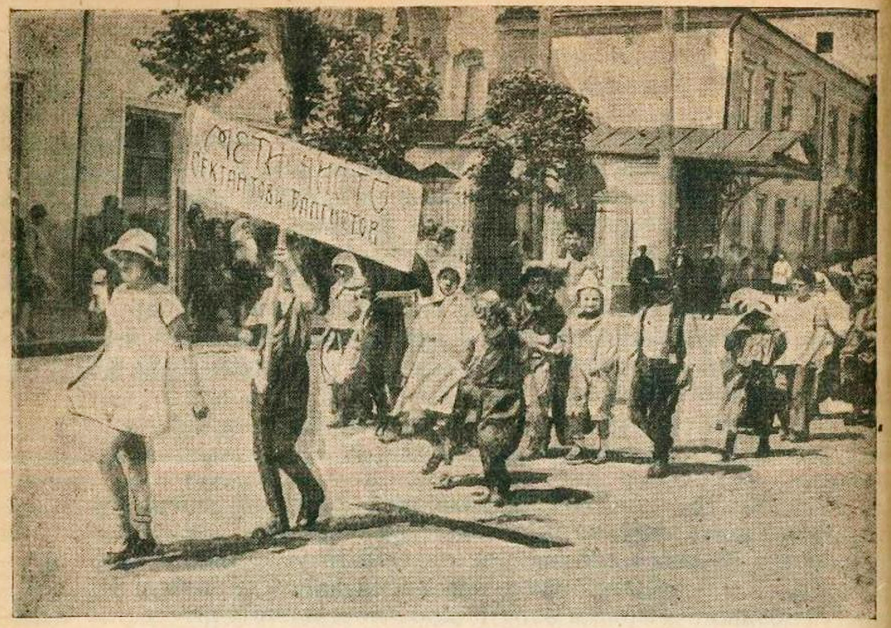
Children carrying an anti-religious slogan in Belarus, circa 1932

Stalin called "to bring to completion the liquidation of the reactionary clergy in our country". Stalin called for an "atheist five year plan" from 1932 to 1937, led by the LMG, in order to eliminate all religious expression in the USSR. It was declared that the concept of God would disappear from the Soviet Union.

Some of the tactics that had been used early on and discarded in the 1920s due to their crude nature or providing too much offense to the feelings of believers. Included in these tactics were the anti-Christmases and anti-Easters that were organized by groups such as the Komsomol.

Anti-clericalism, and attempting to divide religions by pitting laity against their hierarchy was still encouraged. Most of the clergy arrested and imprisoned in the 1920s and onwards never had trials. The maximum sentence for administrative exile in the 1920s had been three years, but this was extended to four years in 1934 when the NKVD was created and given the power to issue such sentences. After serving such terms, most clergy would return their dioceses. Those whose terms ran out around 1930 were often transported later under surveillance to an isolated village in the far north or north-east, never to return.

There had initially been great resistance by religious associations against the beginning of the attack in 1929-1930 and large volumes of petitions to the government.

After 1929 and through the 1930s, the closing of churches, mass arrests of the clergy and religiously active laity, and persecution of people for attending church reached unprecedented proportions. For example, in the central Russian region of Bezhetsk, 100 of the surviving 308 churches were shut in 1929 (only twelve were closed in this region between 1918 and 1929) and in Tula diocese 200 out of the 700 churches were closed in 1929. This campaign began to intensify first in the rural areas before it came to the cities after the liquidation of monasteries in 1932.

Much of this was carried out on secret unpublished instructions from the Central Committee, while confusingly the same Committee would publicly call for an end to the practice of shutting churches. In relation to this, the terror campaign of the 1930s was conducted in an atmosphere of absolute secrecy after bad international publicity that initially followed the campaign run from 1929 to 1930.

Party members that were found to have religious affiliation were purged. Party members that were found to have insufficiently detached themselves from religious affiliations (e.g. if they continued to be friends with the local priest) were expelled and purged.

In 1929 the Soviet press claimed that an espionage organization serving the Polish intelligence service was uncovered in the Baptist community. It was supposedly headed by the Baptist leader Shevchuk and employed a hundred secret agents that were collecting Soviet military secrets. These claims were doubtful, however, and the accusation followed a decision by the Baptist church to allow its membership to serve in the armed forces, which thereby deprived Soviet propaganda of its ability to make accusations, as it had earlier, that the Baptists were irresponsible pacifists who parasitically enjoyed the security provided by their fellow citizens who shed their blood in that nation's defense. Other accusations of this sort were leveled against the Ukrainian Autocephalous Orthodox Church, students at the Leningrad Theological Institute and a number of top engineers and scientists, who were accused of doing espionage for foreign powers and the Vatican, or subversion; this led to trials, imprisonments and executions of multiple individuals. The Ukrainian Autocephalous Orthodox Church was essentially shut down in 1930 through this means, and in the remainder of the decade most of its bishops were killed as well as a number of its followers. A number of Protestant and Roman Catholic dignitaries were "exposed" as foreign spies in 1929–1930. Charges of espionage were commonly used against religious believers in order to arrest them.

There were even accusations that clergy were cooperating with Trotskyites and Zinovievites against the state, although Leon Trotsky was an energetic and militantly atheistic communist leader. In the same theme, Nikolai Bukharin was accused of promoting extreme attacks against believers in order to strengthen the religious convictions of believers and demoralize the atheists.

Church icons and religious architecture were destroyed. The People's Commissariat for Education reduced the list of protected churches from 7000 to 1000, thus leaving 6000 churches to destruction. There were public burnings of thousands of religious icons. The built religious cultural heritage of the country was largely destroyed.

A lull in the active persecution was experienced in 1930–33 following Stalin's 1930 article "Dizzy with Success"; however, it swept back in fervor again afterwards.

=== Campaign against monasteries ===
In 1928 the Politburo adopted a plan to eliminate monasticism in the country, and in the next several years all monasteries were officially closed. This was accompanied by press campaigns that depicted them as parasitic institutions that engaged in immorality (nuns were especially accused of sexual immorality). A number of the dispossessed monks and nuns formed semi-legal clandestine communities around the country after the closures. Prior to and up to this time, there had also been multiple believers who had taken monastic vows in secret and met with secret monastic communities that existed in Soviet cities. Beginning on February 18, 1932, the state conducted a campaign that resulted in near-complete annihilation of all monasticism in the country. On that night all of the monks and nuns in Leningrad were arrested (a total of 316), and the local prisons were filled to their limits in the subsequent period with the arrest of monks and nuns in Leningrad province. In Ukraine, there may have been some survival of semi-overt monasticism into the later 1930s.

The NKVD Kul'tkommissiya, formed in 1931, was used as the chief instrument for legal supervision and forceful repression of religious communities over the next decade.

There was another lull after the 1932 campaign that ended when it re-intensified in 1934.

In 1934 the persecution of the Renovationist sect began to reach the proportions of the persecution of the old Orthodox church. This was triggered by a growing interest of Soviet youth in the Renovationist church.

German Lutheran communities began to experience the same level of persecution and anti-religious repression as other faith communities after 1929.

In Moscow over 400 churches and monasteries were dynamited, including the famous Cathedral of Christ the Saviour.

Oleschuk in 1938 accused the Church and clergy of misinterpreting the new Soviet Constitution's article 146, which allowed social and public organizations to put forward candidate for election to local soviets, by thinking that this meant the Church could put forward candidates. The supreme procurator Andrei Vyshinsky claimed that the only public organizations that were allowed to do this were those "whose aim is active participation in the socialist construction and in national defense". The Church did not fall into either of these categories because it was considered anti-socialist and because Christianity taught to turn the other cheek and love one's enemies, which therefore meant Christians could not be good soldiers and defenders of the homeland.

A large body of Orthodox clergy were liquidated in Gorky in 1938 for supposedly belonging to a network of subversive agents headed by Feofan Tuliakov, the Metropolitan of Gorky, Bishop Purlevsky of Sergach, Bishop Korobov of Vetluga and others. The network was allegedly trying to subvert collective farms and factories, destroy transportation, collect secret information for espionage and to create terrorist bands. They were alleged to have burned twelve houses of collective farmers, and to have cooperated with militantly atheistic Trotskyites and Bukharinites against the Soviet state. This guise served to cover mass executions of clergy.

In the late 1930s being associated with the Church was dangerous. Even a brief visit to a church could mean loss of employment and irreparable career damage, expulsion from educational establishments and even to arrest. People who wore pectoral crosses underneath their clothing could be subject to persecution. People could be arrested for such things as having an icon in their home (the orthodox practice of kissing icons was blamed for an epidemic of syphilis), inviting a priest to perform a religious rite or service at home since the local churches were closed. Priests caught performing such rites were often imprisoned and disappeared forever. Massive numbers of believers were effectively imprisoned or executed for nothing except overtly witnessing their faith, especially if they were charismatic or of great stature and spiritual authority, because they were therefore undermining the antireligious propaganda.

Exact figures of victims is difficult to calculate due to the nature of the campaign and may never be known with certainty. During the purges of 1937 and 1938, church documents record that 168,300 Russian Orthodox clergy were arrested. Of these, over 100,000 were shot. Lower estimates claim that at least 25,000–30,000 clergy were killed in the 1930s and 1940s. When including both religious (i.e., monks and nuns) and clergy, historian Nathaniel Davis estimates that 80,000 were killed by the end of the 1930s. Alexander Yakovlev, the head of the Commission for Rehabilitating Victims of Political Repression (in the modern Russian government) has stated that the number of monks, nuns and priests killed in the purges is over 200,000. About 600 bishops of both the Orthodox and the Renovationists were killed. The number of laity killed likely greatly exceeds the number of clergy. Thousands of victims of persecution became recognized in a special canon of saints known as the "new martyrs and confessors of Russia".

In the late 1930s when war was brewing Europe, the anti-religious propaganda carried the line that devout Christians could not make good soldiers because Christianity was anti-war, preached love of one's enemies, turning the other cheek, etc. This propaganda stood in sharp contradiction with the anti-religious propaganda that had been produced in the 1920s that blamed the church for preaching unqualified patriotism in World War I. To a lesser degree, it also differed from the criticism of Christians who had fought for Russia in World War I but who would not take up arms for the USSR.

Regarding the persecution of clergy, Michael Ellman has stated that "...the 1937–38 terror against the clergy of the Russian Orthodox Church and of other religions (Binner & Junge 2004) might also qualify as genocide".

== Notable atrocities and victims ==
Because the campaign was conducted in secrecy, no complete record of the state's actions exists, and much of what is known about individual cases comes from church sources. Many bishops were arrested, exiled and killed. Metropolitan Konstantin (D'iakov) of Kyiv was shot in prison in 1937 without trial, and Bishop Maxim (Zhizhilenko), a former prison surgeon, was executed in 1931. The theologian Pavel Florensky was sent to a northern camp in 1933 and died there in 1943.

Arrests also took the form of mass actions against clergy and congregations. In 1933, the NKVD arrested worshippers leaving a church near Kazan, and ten were later executed. In 1938, all remaining clergy in Poltava were arrested in a single night. Some clergy survived repeated arrests, among them Bishop Manuil (Lemeshevsky) and Bishop Luka, a surgeon who was later awarded the Stalin Prize.

== Foreign criticism ==
Many protests occurred in Western countries against the wild persecutions in the USSR, and there were mass public prayers in the United Kingdom, Rome and other places on behalf of the persecuted Church. These activities contributed greatly to the temporary halt in persecution in the early years of the 1930s and to the decision to run the anti-religious terror campaign covertly; Stalin could not afford total alienation of the West as he still needed its credits and machines for industrialization.

== Resolution of debate ==
The ongoing debate between the "rightist" and "leftist" sides of how to best combat religion found some resolution by 1930. The journal Under the Banner of Marxism, edited by Abram Deborin, proclaimed victory of the leftist side of the debate in 1929, but it was a year later withdrawn from publication until February 1931, when an editorial appeared in it that condemned both the rightist thinking and the Deborin group. The journal was criticized for failing to become "the organ of militant atheism" as Lenin had ordered by being too philosophical and abstract in argumentation, as well as detached from the real anti-religious struggle. This was part of the purges that characterized the 1930s as well as Stalin's efforts to submit all marxist institutions to himself. Marxist leaders who took either position on this issue would find themselves attacked by a paranoid Stalin who did not tolerate other authorities to speak as authorities on public policy.

Trotsky, Bukharin and other "traitors" were condemned as well as their ideas on the antireligious struggle.

== Drop in enthusiasm for the anti-religious campaign ==
The failure of the propaganda war was evident in the increasing reliance on terror tactics by the regime in the antireligious campaign in the 1930s. However, by the end of the decade it may have become apparent to the leadership of the antireligious campaign that the previous two decades of experience had shown that religion was a much deeper rooted phenomenon than originally thought.

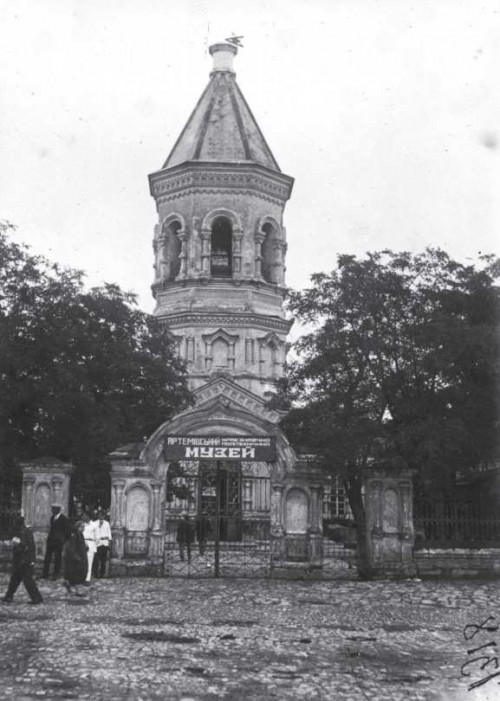
Conversion of a former church into a museum in 1932

Anti-religious museums began to be closed in the late 1930s and chairs of "scientific atheism" were abolished in universities. The average figures for those who attended atheist lectures was dropping to less than 50 per lecture by 1940. The circulation of anti-religious journals was dropping as was membership in the League of the Militant Godless. There are different reasons that may have caused this, including some moral alienation of people from the brutality of the campaign as well as the fact that the centralized terror did not have much tolerance for autonomous organizations, and even those who worked for anti-religious purposes could find themselves criticized in the campaign or subject to purge for deviating from the established line. Stalin's mind may have changed as well; he may have lost patience with the campaign, alternatively he may have thought that it had reached its goals once organized religion had ceased to exist in any public way throughout the country or he may have thought that the looming war clouds needed a more unified country. The leadership may also have concluded that a long-term, deep, insistent and patient persuasion would be needed in light of religion's perseverance.

In 1937, Grekulov, a Soviet historian, author of The Mores of the Russian Clergy, published an article in an official journal that praised Russia's conversion to Christianity in the 10th century as a means that culture and learning entered the country. This was in contrast to years earlier when the League of the Militant Godless had attacked school teachers who claimed that the church benefitted Russia in this way. What Grekulov wrote would become the official Soviet position until the fall of communism.

Even still, the persecution continued full swing and the clergy were attacked as foreign spies in the late 1930s and trials of bishops were conducted with their clergy as well as lay adherents who were reported as "subversive terroristic gangs" that had been unmasked.

The tone was changing at that point though, especially following the annexation of the new territories in eastern Poland in 1939, as party leaders, such as Oleschuk, began to claim that only a tiny minority of religious believers were class enemies of state. Church institutions in Eastern Poland were abolished or taken over by the state. The anti-religious work in the new territories was even criticized for being too zealous and Oleschuk advised against setting up new LMG cells in the territories. When the Nazis invaded in 1941, the secret police rounded up multiple Ukrainian Catholic priests who were either murdered or sent into internal exile.

Official Soviet figures reported that up to one third of urban and two thirds of rural population still held religious beliefs by 1937 (a decrease from estimated 80% of the country being religious in the late 1920s); altogether this made up 50% of the state's population (and even these figures may have been low estimates). However, religion had been hit powerfully; the number of churches had been reduced from 50,000 in 1917 to only a few hundred (and there was not a single church open in Belarus) or perhaps even less, out of 300 bishops in 1917 (and 163 in 1929) only 4 remained (Metropolitan Sergii (the head of the church), Metropolitan Alexii of Leningrad, Bishop Nikolai (Yarushevich), and Metropolitan Sergi (Voskresenski)), out of 45,000 priests there were only to 2,000–3,000 remaining, not a single monastery remained open and the only thing that enthusiasts of atheism could still do was to spy on individual believers and denounce them to the secret police.

There were 600 religious communities in Moscow in 1917, and only 20–21 of these still existed by 1939. In Leningrad, where there had been 401 Orthodox churches in 1918, there were only five remaining. Belgorod and district, which had 47 churches and 3 monasteries in 1917 had only 4 churches left by 1936. Novgorod, which had 42 churches and 3 monasteries in 1917 had only 15 churches by 1934. Kuibyshev and its diocese, which had 2200 churches, mosques and other temples in 1917 had only 325 by 1937. The number of registered religious communities by 1941 had dropped to 8000 (of which the vast majority were present in the newly annexed western territories). Proportionally more churches had been closed in rural areas than in cities. All religions in the country by the end of the 1930s had had most of their buildings either confiscated or destroyed, and most of their clerical leadership arrested or dead.

The anti-religious campaign of the past decade and the terror tactics of the militantly atheist regime, had effectively eliminated all public expressions of religion and communal gatherings of believers outside of the walls of the few churches (or mosques, synagogues, etc.) that still held services. This was accomplished in a country that only a few decades earlier had had a deeply Orthodox Christian public life and culture that had developed for almost a thousand years.

== See also ==
- Marxist–Leninist atheism
- Persecution of Christians in the Soviet Union
- Persecution of Christians in Warsaw Pact countries
- Soviet anti-religious legislation
- The Mores of the Russian Clergy
- USSR anti-religious campaign (1917–1921)
- USSR anti-religious campaign (1921–1928)
- USSR anti-religious campaign (1958–1964)
- USSR anti-religious campaign (1970s–1990)
