= Dell'Aquila =

Dell'Aquila is an Italian surname. Notable people with the surname include:

- Antonio Dell'Aquila (born 1957), Italian rower
- Armando Dell'Aquila (born 1987), Italian rower
- Giuseppe Dell'Aquila (born 1962), Italian criminal
- Richard Dell'Aquila, American politician
- Vito Dell'Aquila (born 2000), Italian Taekwondo athlete
