= God-Building =

Early Bolshevik idea to reform religion towards Marxism

God-Building is the idea that in place of the abolition of religion, there should be a meta-religious context in which religions were viewed primarily in terms of the psychological and social effect of ritual, myth, and symbolism. It was proposed by some prominent early Marxists in the Bolshevik faction of the Russian Social Democratic Labour Party in the early-20th century, who were inspired by Auguste Comte's Religion of Humanity. They aimed to harness this for pro-communist aims, both by creating new ritual and symbolism, and by re-interpreting existing ritual and symbolism in a socialist context.

== Origin ==
Anatoly Lunacharsky was aligned with the Vperedist wing of the Bolshevik faction. Although he would later rejoin the Bolsheviks and indeed become People's Commissar for Education after October 1917, he was originally closely associated with Vladimir Lenin's rival, his brother-in-law Alexander Bogdanov. In his two volume work Religion and Socialism (1908–11), Lunacharsky propounded his theory of bogostroitel'stvo (богостроительство, 'God-Building'):

Scientific socialism, is the most religious of all religions, and the true Social Democrat is the most deeply religious of all human beings.

He proposed a new religious sentiment which would be accommodating to the world-view of communism by creating a new religion that was compatible with science and not based on any supernatural beliefs.

Lunacharsky claimed that, while traditional religion was false and was used for the purposes of exploitation, it still cultivated emotion, moral values, desires, and other aspects of life that were important to human society. He believed that these aspects should be transformed into positive humanistic values of a new communist morality, instead of destroying religion outright when it served as the psychological and moral basis for millions of people. In his idea, God would gradually be replaced with a new vision of humanity, and through doing so socialism would achieve great success.

He and his supporters argued that Marxism was too mechanically deterministic with regard to human beings and that it alone would not be able to inspire masses of people. They further posited that symbolism and ritual served a necessary social and psychological role.

Ludwig Feuerbach's 'religion of humanity', on which this was inspired, held that God would be replaced by man as an object of worship. It did not mean that single individuals would be worshipped, but rather the entire potential of the human race and all its achievements would be the object of worship. Instead of projecting human values onto the heavens and submitting people to their own illusory creation, these values would be worshipped in humanity as a whole, which possessed them collectively. This religion would bring people to value themselves and to find common purpose, community and universal meaning in themselves as a collective.

Along with Feuerbach, they also received inspiration from Richard Avenarius' Naturfilisof, Ernst Mach's Empirio-criticism, as well as from Friedrich Nietzsche. Lunacharsky was also particularly interested in the Greek Mystery Schools, especially the Eleusinian Mysteries. Lunacharsky viewed the Eleusinian Mysteries as a model for how communal ritual could be used as a vehicle for the teaching of moral concepts.

They understood the term religion to mean a link between human beings as individuals, a link between human beings and communities, and a link between human beings and societies in the past as well as future. Lunacharsky wrote, "For the sake of the great struggle for life... it is necessary for humanity to almost organically merge into an integral unity. Not a mechanical or chemical... but a psychic, consciously emotional linking-together... is in fact a religious emotion." He argued that atheism in itself is pessimistic, because life becomes meaningless, and that in order to solve this one needed to turn to the pleasure of a religion to give meaning. Atheism didn't provide people with the meaning in their lives that religion did and once religion was taken away, people would feel empty unless something was put in its place. In its place, Lunacharsky proposed they should place humanity as a transcendent entity.

Lunacharsky wished to change the commandment to love God above everything:

You must love and deify matter above everything else, [love and deify] the corporal nature or the life of your body as the primary cause of things, as existence without a beginning or end, which has been and forever will be... God is humanity in its highest potential. But there is no humanity in the highest potential... Let us then love the potentials of mankind, our potentials, and represent them in a garland of glory in order to love them ever more.

Lunacharsky saw Marxism as having religious components, including its faith in the inevitable victory of socialism, as well as its belief in science and material existence as producing all human relations. These elements could assist in the God-Building. Lunacharsky interpreted the events of the 1905 revolution as an expression of religious forces in the nation. The religion to be created would worship the social ideal of socialism in its deification of humanity.

Lunacharsky and his supporters rejected the divinity of Christ, but they deeply respect him and re-interpreted him as a revolutionary leader and the world's first Communist. The new religion would have prayer that would be addressed to progress, humanity, and human genius. Collective, rather than individual, prayer was stressed due to the wish to use the spiritual practice to support a common revolutionary action. This new religion would have temples and rituals, and theatre with symbolic plays to induce spiritual feelings. Lunacharsky believed that theatre and symbolism were important tools of psychological and sociological transformation, and the "struggle of the human soul" against oppression.

== Rejection ==
Anatoly Lunacharsky's notion that religion was a complex phenomenon with many aspects stood in contrast to the views of other Soviet leaders in the early days of the USSR who thought that religion would disappear with the changing material conditions, under the Marxist presumption that religion and all ideology was simply a product of material conditions.

Vladimir Lenin was infuriated by this concept, and considered Lunacharsky's position to be extremely harmful, by supposedly transforming Marxism into a mild liberal reformism. He believed it obscured the fact that religion had been a tool of ideological exploitation, and that this idea was making a compromise with reactionary forces.

Lenin's victory in the 1917 October Revolution led to the rejection of this school of thought, except in the case of Alexander Bogdanov.

Lenin had strong views on religion going back many years:

Religion is one of the forms of spiritual oppression which everywhere weighs down heavily upon the masses of the people, over burdened by their perpetual work for others, by want and isolation. Impotence of the exploited classes in their struggle against the exploiters just as inevitably gives rise to the belief in a better life after death as impotence of the savage in his battle with nature gives rise to belief in gods, devils, miracles, and the like. Those who toil and live in want all their lives are taught by religion to be submissive and patient while here on earth, and to take comfort in the hope of a heavenly reward. But those who live by the labour of others are taught by religion to practise charity while on earth, thus offering them a very cheap way of justifying their entire existence as exploiters and selling them at a moderate price tickets to well-being in heaven. Religion is opium for the people. Religion is a sort of spiritual booze, in which the slaves of capital drown their human image, their demand for a life more or less worthy of man.

Marx had rejected Feuerbach's idea of a religion of humanity as well; this example served Lenin's argument. Lenin would not compromise with religion even in this form, and he felt that it would ultimately degenerate into a betrayal of the Bolshevik cause. Lunacharsky himself gave in to the atheist view after the revolution, changing his views on Christ in later propaganda by calling him a mythical personality and not a historic figure.

== Legacy of Lunacharsky ==
Lunacharsky's idea was adopted by a number of other leading Bolsheviks, including Maxim Gorky and Alexander Bogdanov.

Lunacharsky advocated criticizing clergymen for failing to keep biblical teaching and other strategies that relied on understanding religion in greater depth. While he urged moderation (not on principle but out of pragmatic concerns) and this would be ignored, the simplistic views on religion as a mere class phenomenon were discarded in favour of understanding it as a more complex phenomenon.

Ideas related to God-building did emerge in the years following.

Beginning in 1926, the Russian-Soviet writer and medical doctor V. Veresaev, argued in favour of developing beautiful and standardised rituals for important occasions such as giving names to infants, weddings and funerals. He argued that the state already possessed many rituals (parades, demonstrations, etc.), but that they were "depressingly untalented and miserable." He and many others argued that people were going to churches due to disappointment in the bureaucratic indifference and poor quality of Soviet state marriages or birth-registration. One Communist rural teacher who supported him claimed that he would not preach atheism to peasants because when one makes them atheists, one deprives them of all rituals along with the religion and gives nothing to replace them with. A Komsomol activist who supported him presented a case of a person whose wife had died, was buried through means of an emotionally cold and indifferent secular-communist ceremony, and the man, greatly depressed by it, consumed a full bottle of vodka while crying in tears. Lenin had claimed that religion was a kind of spiritual booze in that it acted like a drug for people, while this man had turned to booze in place of religion.

Veresaev, however, was attacked by Marxist intellectuals and his ideas, like Lunacharsky's, were rejected. Veresaev warned that "life would become a bore and man would turn into an empty container' as a result, and that these people who opposed him were 'stooping people with protruding foreheads, short-sighted eyes and thick spectacles" who didn't appreciate beauty and had no need for rituals in their lives.

Lunacharsky's idea of 'God-building' would not be revived in any major way, however, until the 1960s.

The Russian Orthodox Church saw this whole new religion in the category of the false prophets that Christ had predicted, and related it to Satanism. Laskovaia, a Soviet author, pointed to a similarity in Lunacharsky's ideas with the Death of God concept of western theologians, such as Dietrich Bonhoeffer and John A.T. Robinson.

=== Revival of God-Building ===
In February 1962, the "All-Union Conference on Scientific Propaganda" was held in Moscow. Among the ideas discussed it was suggested that "Religious people should be educated in the principles of communist morality and ethics, religious customs and traditions are to be replaced by religious feasts and rituals to satisfy the aesthetic and emotional needs of believers."

In 1965, as Nikita Khrushchev's attack on religion had appeared to produce no effective results, more suggestions began to appear in the Soviet press that pseudo-religious rites should be instituted that would create a mystical link between people and the promised Communist society of the future, glorified in the labour of the present. The rites and services would be oriented to an utopian future promised by the Communist society. Events and days for glorifying Communism would be celebrated. Special temples with symbolic artistic ornaments would be built to glorify Communism as man's greatest achievement, with oratorios composed and performed in the temples.

The new proponents of this God-Building scheme did not go as far as Lunacharsky and tried to avoid blatantly challenging Lenin's earlier rebuke. The theoretical discussion produced little of what it proposed, but it did lead the way to the introduction of special rituals being created in certain official events. For example, in 1966, an 'All-Union Day of the Agricultural Worker' was set up and based on rituals connected with St John the Baptist's Day. The new ceremonies were meant to help call people to the social, political, and ideological unity of society under socialism. In Ukraine it was called the 'Holiday of the Hammer and Sickle', which is described:

On an early December morning tractor drivers [from the surrounding region] converge in Zhytomyr. At the entry to the city they are met by the representatives of the city factories who report to them on the progress of the socialist emulation and invite the drivers to their factories, where the peasants and the workers engage in heart-searching and business like discussions. Then a parade of agrarian technology takes place at the Lenin Square. Solemnly, accompanied by an orchestra, the best workers and peasants receive their prizes and diplomas. Then all of them make public production-quota pledges for the forthcoming year at the city theatre.

Special rites and ceremonies were devised in the 1960s to celebrate the granting of passports on the sixteenth birthday. Another rite was created for initiation into the ranks of workers and peasants. As early as the late 1950s, the state had also been making more ceremonious civil marriages, name-giving ceremonies for babies and funerals, in order to compete with the church.

In Western Ukraine, clubs of militant atheists in the post-Khrushchev years created new secular rites to replace church-related rites.

Paganism re-emerged in areas that the church had been eliminated from, and this was used in the arguments of those who argued in favour of God-building and the need for people to have religion.

Official Soviet propaganda proclaimed much success in these rites tearing people away from the church, however, this may not have been truthful. Official figures that showed declines in baptisms or church marriages, may have reflected more people asking pastors to do such things secretly rather than an actual decline after the introduction of improved secular rites.

== See also ==
- Cult of Reason
