= Norman H. Purple =

American judge

Norman Higgins Purple
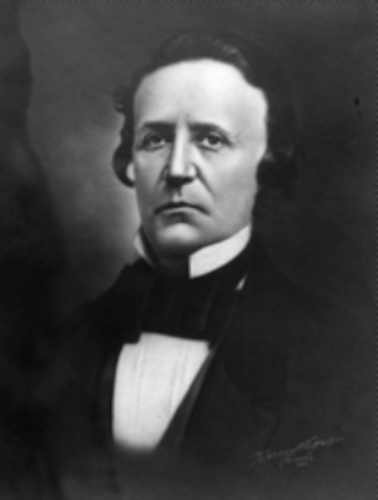
- Purple's portrait at the Illinois Supreme Court.
- Born: March 29, 1803; Exeter, New York
- Died: August 9, 1863 (aged 60); Chicago, Illinois
- Occupation: American jurist

Norman Higgins Purple (March 29, 1803 – August 9, 1863) was an American jurist.

Born in Exeter, Otsego County, New York, Purple studied law in Tioga and Wayne Counties, Pennsylvania and was admitted to the Pennsylvania bar in 1830. In 1837, Purple moved to Peoria, Illinois and practiced law. From 1840 to 1842, Purple served as state's attorney. In 1844, Purple was a presidential elector on the Democratic ticket for the United States Presidential Election of 1844. From 1845 until 1848, Purple served on the Illinois Supreme Court. He resigned in 1848 when the Illinois Constitution of 1848 was adopted. Purple continued to practice law in Peoria, Illinois and published several works on law, including the Illinois real-estate statutes. He served on the Illinois Constitutional Convention of 1862. Purple died in Chicago, Illinois.
