= USS Aquila =

Two ships in the United States Navy have been named Aquila after the constellation Aquila.

- USS Aquila (AK-47) was a cargo transport in service from 1941 to 1945.
- USS Aquila (PHM-4) was a Pegasus-class hydrofoil launched in 1981.
