= Aquilla, Ohio =

- Unincorporated community
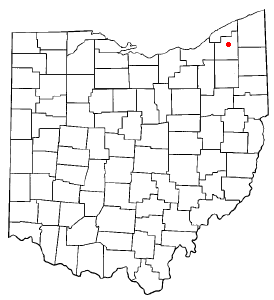
- Location of Aquilla, Ohio

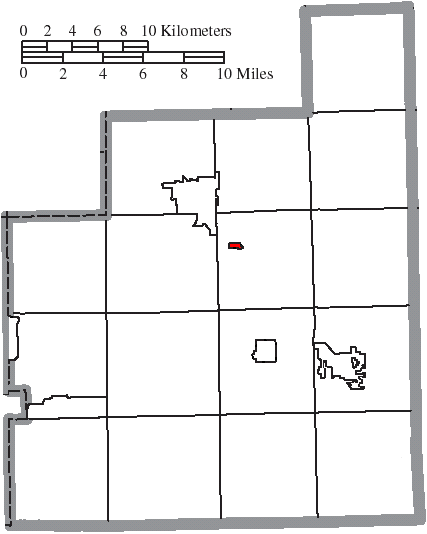
- Location of Aquilla in Geauga County
- Coordinates: 41°32′47″N 81°10′33″W
- Country: United States
- State: Ohio
- County: Geauga

Area
  - Total: 0.15 sq mi (0.38 km^{2})
  - Land: 0.15 sq mi (0.38 km^{2})
  - Water: 0 sq mi (0.00 km^{2})
- Elevation: 1,145 ft (349 m)

Population (2020)
  - Total: 305
  - Estimate (2023): 306
  - Density: 2,068.2/sq mi (798.54/km^{2})
- Time zone: UTC-5 (Eastern (EST))
  - Summer (DST): UTC-4 (EDT)
- FIPS code: 39-02274
- GNIS feature ID: 2397975

Aquilla is an unincorporated community and former village in Claridon Township, Geauga County, Ohio, United States. The population was 305 at the 2020 census. It is part of the Cleveland metropolitan area.

== History ==
Aquilla incorporated as a village in 1946. On March 30, 2021, Aquilla withdrew from Claridon Township by forming a paper township named Aquilla Township. Residents of Aquilla voted to dissolve the village in 2024.

== Geography ==
According to the United States Census Bureau, the village had a total area of 0.15 square miles (0.39 km^{2}), all land.

== Demographics ==
Historical population
Census	Pop.	Note	%±
1950	386		—
1960	459		18.9%
1970	389		−15.3%
1980	355		−8.7%
1990	360		1.4%
2000	372		3.3%
2010	340		−8.6%
2020	305		−10.3%
2023 (est.)	306	▲	0.3%
U.S. Decennial Census

=== 2010 census ===
As of the census of 2010, there were 340 people, 128 households, and 97 families living in the village. The population density was 2,266.7 inhabitants per square mile (875.2/km^{2}). There were 150 housing units at an average density of 1,000.0 per square mile (386.1/km^{2}). The racial makeup of the village was 97.9% White, 0.3% Asian, and 1.8% from two or more races.

There were 128 households, of which 37.5% had children under the age of 18 living with them, 48.4% were married couples living together, 17.2% had a female householder with no husband present, 10.2% had a male householder with no wife present, and 24.2% were non-families. 19.5% of all households were made up of individuals, and 4.7% had someone living alone who was 65 years of age or older. The average household size was 2.66 and the average family size was 2.98.

The median age in the village was 39.3 years. 28.5% of residents were under the age of 18; 6.2% were between the ages of 18 and 24; 24.9% were from 25 to 44; 30.6% were from 45 to 64; and 9.7% were 65 years of age or older. The gender makeup of the village was 49.4% male and 50.6% female.

=== 2000 census ===
As of the census of 2000, there were 372 people, 138 households, and 98 families living in the village. The population density was 2,658.4 inhabitants per square mile (1,026.4/km^{2}). There were 146 housing units at an average density of 1,043.4 per square mile (402.9/km^{2}). The racial makeup of the village was 98.39% White, 0.27% African American, 0.81% Asian, and 0.54% from two or more races. Hispanic or Latino of any race were 0.27% of the population.

There were 138 households, out of which 38.4% had children under the age of 18 living with them, 52.9% were married couples living together, 17.4% had a female householder with no husband present, and 28.3% were non-families. 23.2% of all households were made up of individuals, and 6.5% had someone living alone who was 65 years of age or older. The average household size was 2.70 and the average family size was 3.18.

In the village, the population was spread out, with 27.7% under the age of 18, 5.9% from 18 to 24, 36.6% from 25 to 44, 21.8% from 45 to 64, and 8.1% who were 65 years of age or older. The median age was 35 years. For every 100 females there were 83.3 males. For every 100 females age 18 and over, there were 86.8 males.

The median income for a household in the village was $48,750, and the median income for a family was $50,750. Males had a median income of $29,643 versus $19,583 for females. The per capita income for the village was $16,256. None of the families and 1.6% of the population were living below the poverty line, including no under eighteens and none of those over 64.

== Education ==
It is in the Chardon Local School District.
