= Frank J. Aquila =

American corporate lawyer (born 1957)

- Born: February 3, 1957; New York City
- Education: Columbia University (BA, 1979); Brooklyn Law School (JD, 1984)
- Occupation: Corporate Lawyer
- Website: http://www.sullcrom.com

Frank J. Aquila is an American corporate lawyer. His practice focuses on mergers and acquisitions and corporate governance matters.

Aquila serves as partner at prominent New York City law firm Sullivan & Cromwell and played a crucial role as lead counsel to InBev in their 2008 unsolicited acquisition of Anheuser-Busch, the largest all-cash acquisition ever.

Aquila is frequently quoted in the media on complex negotiation issues. He has appeared on CNBC, Fox Business, Bloomberg Television, and Bloomberg Radio. He is a frequent author and has been a columnist for Bloomberg Businessweek, and the New York Times DealBook blog.

== Early life ==
Aquila was born in 1957, in New York City. He attended Columbia University (BA, 1979) and received a degree from Brooklyn Law School (J.D., 1984).

== Career ==
Aquila joined Sullivan & Cromwell in 1983 after graduating from Brooklyn Law School. He honed his deal making skills under legendary mergers and acquisitions lawyer H. Rodgin Cohen, the firm's former chairman and became a partner in 1992. Aquila is co-head of Sullivan & Cromwell's General Practice Group. This group includes the firm's corporate, financial institutions, securities, mergers and acquisitions, corporate governance, real estate, leveraged finance, private equity, project finance, restructuring, and intellectual property transactional practices.

Aquila represents large multinational corporations in transactions and has represented British Airways, Diageo, Amgen, Goldman Sachs, Morgan Stanley, EchoStar, InBev, Sainsbury, Payless ShoeSource, Pharmacia, Burger King, Pillsbury Company, and Medtronic. In 2008, Aquila successfully led InBev in their unsolicited $52 billion acquisition of Anheuser-Busch, the largest all-cash acquisition in corporate history. He was named "Dealmaker of the Week" by the American Lawyer for his "tenacity and creativity in getting the deal done".

Aquila serves as a regular adviser to companies such as Amgen, International Airline Group (British Airways), Diageo, Avon, Navistar International, United Rentals and Anheuser-Busch InBev.

== Notable transactions ==
Aquila has been involved in several high-profile acquisitions including:

- Amgen in its acquisition of Onyx Pharmaceuticals
- Optimer Pharmaceuticals in its acquisition by Cubist Pharmaceuticals
- Collective Brands in its acquisitions of Stride Rite and Collective International
- J. Sainsbury in the sale of its U.S. supermarket businesses to Albertsons
- Aames Investment Corp. in its merger with Accredited Home Lenders
- Medtronic in its acquisitions of MiniMed and Medical Research Group
- Western Resources in its bids for ADT and KCP&L
- Pharmacia & Upjohn in its merger with Monsanto
- InBev in its acquisition of Anheuser-Busch and Anheuser-Busch InBev in its acquisition of Grupo Modelo
- British Airways in its combination with Iberia to form International Airline Group and its joint venture with American Airlines and Iberia.

== Awards and recognition ==
Aquila received the Burton Award for Legal Achievement twice, in 2005 and 2010.

In 2008 and again in 2013, he was named "Dealmaker of the week" by The American Lawyer.

In 2009, he was named "Dealmaker of the year" by The American Lawyer.

In 2009, he was selected by the American Bar Association as a "Legal Rebel" – one of the profession's 50 leading innovators .

In 2010, Aquila received the Atlas Award for Global M&A Lawyer of the Year .

In 2011, Aquila was a distinguished Alumni of the Year honoree at his alma mater Brooklyn Law School .

Aquila has been named by the National Association of Corporate Directors (NACD) to their "Directorship 100" – one of the 100 most influential people in corporate governance and inside the boardroom in 2011, 2012 and 2-13.

Aquila is a member, and former Chairman, of the Board of Trustees of the NALP Foundation for Law Career Research and Education . He also serves on the Board of Directors of the International Institute for Conflict Prevention and Resolution, the Board of Directors of Dress for Success Worldwide, the Board of Trustees of Brooklyn Law School and is a former member of the Board of Advisors of the Salvation Army of Greater New York and a former Vice Chairman of the Board of Trustees of Saint Peter's University Hospital and Healthcare System.

Aquila is a member of the Council on Foreign Relations and the Leadership Council on Legal Diversity.

== Features ==
Aquila has been featured twice in the American Lawyer, the Wall Street Journal, and in the book Dethroning the King: The Hostile Takeover of Anheuser-Busch, an American Icon by Julie MacIntosh

== Personal life ==
Frank Aquila is married to Cathy Aquila and they have three daughters, Jessica, Jillian and Elaina. Aquila is an avid fan of the New York Mets, Jets, Knicks, and Rangers. He is a wine collector with a 3,000-bottle wine cellar .
