= Aquilinus of Fossombrone =

Italian saint and bishop

- Born: 5th century Fossombrone
- Honored in: Catholic Church
- Feast: March 29

Aquilinus of Fossombrone, was an Italian saint and bishop who lived in the late 5th century. He is revered as a Christian martyr and a patron saint of Fossombrone, a town in Italy. Aquilinus' life and legacy are commemorated in Christian traditions, and he is venerated by the Catholic Church. The martyrologies mention several martyrs of Fossombrone including Aquilinus, Geminus, Gelasius, Magnus and Donata, also a bishop, Timothy, and his daughter.

Aquilinus' life and death are not well-documented. However, his legacy has been preserved through the town's history and the religious traditions of the area. Aquilinus is believed to have been a devout Christian who was killed for his faith.
