= Varya Akulova =

Ukrainian circus performer

Varvara Akulova
- Born: 10 January 1992 (age 34); Kryvyi Rih, Ukraine
- Occupations: school performer, strongwoman

Varvara Yuriyivna Akulova (Ukrainian: Варвара Юріївна Акулова; born 10 January 1992 in Kryvyi Rih), daughter of circus performers Yuriy Akulov and Larysa Akulova and referred to as "The Strongest Girl In The World", was capable of lifting up to 48 stone (300 kg), over four times her bodyweight in 2006. In 2000, she weighed 40 kg and could lift 220 pounds (100 kg). She has been in the Guinness Book of World Records.

Akulova, while living with her parents in Kryvyi Rih, performed in an acrobatic act with them in a circus.
