= Italian ship Aquila =

Aquila was the name of at least three ships of the Italian Navy and may refer to:

- Italian cruiser Aquila, an Aquila-class scout cruiser ordered by Romania as the destroyer Vifor. Seized in 1915 by Italy and renamed before her launch in 1916. Transferred to Spain, unofficially in 1937 and officially in 1939, as Melilla. Reclassified as a destroyer in 1938. Sold for scrapping in 1950.
- Italian aircraft carrier Aquila, previously the passenger liner SS Roma. Conversion started in 1941 but was never finished. She was broken up in 1951.
- Italian corvette Aquila (F 542), an Albatros-class corvette launched in 1954 as the Dutch HNLMS Lynx. Transferred to Italy and renamed in 1961. She was stricken in 1991.
