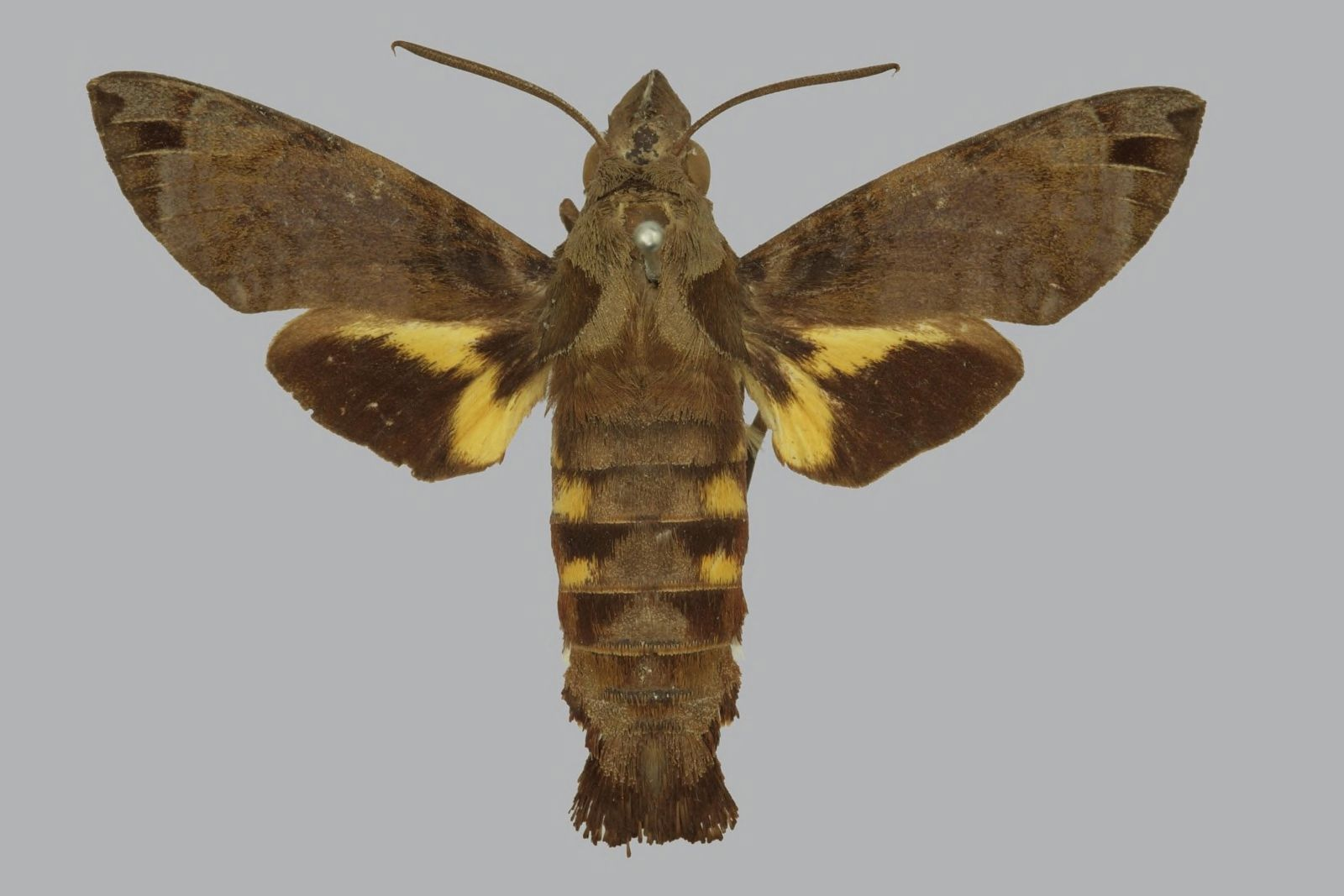

Scientific classification
- Kingdom: Animalia
- Phylum: Arthropoda
- Class: Insecta
- Order: Lepidoptera
- Family: Sphingidae
- Genus: Macroglossum
- Species: M. aquila

Binomial name
- Macroglossum aquila Boisduval, 1875

Synonyms
- Macroglossa aquila Boisduval, [1875]

= Macroglossum aquila =

Species of moth

Macroglossum aquila is a moth of the family Sphingidae. It is known from north-eastern India, Bangladesh, Thailand, southern China, Vietnam, Malaysia (Peninsular, Sarawak), Indonesia (Sumatra, Java, Kalimantan) and the Philippines (Luzon).

The wingspan is 49–54 mm.
