= Aquila (name) =

Aquila is both a given name and a surname. Notable people with the name include:

== Ancient and biblical ==
- Priscilla and Aquila, a New Testament couple who assisted Paul of Tarsus
- Aquila of Sinope, second-century translator of the Old Testament
- Aquila Romanus, a third-century Latin grammarian
- Pontius Aquila, first-century B.C. Roman tribune of the plebs

== Medieval and renaissance ==
- Caspar Aquila (1488–1560), German reformer
- Nicholas de Aquila (died after 1220), English bishop
- Peter of Aquila (died 1361), Italian theologian
- Pietro Aquila (c. 1630–1692), Italian painter
- Richard II of Aquila, 12th-century Italo-Norman Count of Fondi
- Serafino dell' Aquila (1466–1500), Italian poet

== Modern ==
- Aquila Chase (17th century), early Puritan settler in the American colonies and founder of the influential Chase family
- Aquila Emil (died 2011), Papua New Guinean rugby league footballer
- Aquila Berlas Kiani (1921–2012), Pakistani scholar
- Frank Aquila, a Manitoba judge
- Frank J. Aquila (born 1957), American lawyer
- Samuel J. Aquila (born 1950), Roman Catholic bishop

== See also ==
- Aquilla (disambiguation)
