= Aquila 27 =

Sailboat class

Aquila 27 Regatta
Development
- Designer: Philippe Harlé
- Location: France
- Year: 1975
- No. built: 1048
- Builder: Jeanneau
- Role: Cruiser-Racer
- Name: Aquila 27 Regatta

Boat
- Displacement: 6,393 lb (2,900 kg)
- Draft: 5.64 ft (1.72 m)

Hull
- Type: monohull
- Construction: fiberglass
- LOA: 27.17 ft (8.28 m)
- LWL: 23.72 ft (7.23 m)
- Beam: 9.74 ft (2.97 m)
- Engine: inboard 12 hp (9 kW) diesel engine

Hull appendages
- Keel: fin keel
- Ballast: 2,200 lb (998 kg)
- Rudder: skeg-mounted rudder

Rig
- Rig type: Bermuda rig
- P mainsail luff: 27.67 ft (8.43 m)
- E mainsail foot: 9.5 ft (2.9 m)

Sails
- Sailplan: masthead sloop
- Mainsail area: 149 sq ft (13.8 m^{2})
- Jib/genoa area: 260 sq ft (24 m^{2})
- Spinnaker area: 564 sq ft (52.4 m^{2})
- Upwind sail area: 409 sq ft (38.0 m^{2})
- Downwind sail area: 713 sq ft (66.2 m^{2})

The Aquila 27 is a French sailboat that was designed by Philippe Harlé, as a cruiser-racer and first built in 1975.

== Production ==
The design was built by Jeanneau in France, from 1975 until 1984, with 1048 boats completed.

== Design ==
The Aquila 27 is a recreational keelboat, built predominantly of fiberglass, with wood trim. It has a masthead sloop rig, with a deck-stepped mast and aluminum spars with stainless steel wire rigging. The hull has a raked stem, a reverse transom, a skeg-mounted rudder controlled by a tiller and a fixed fin keel or shoal draft keel.

The boat is fitted with an inboard diesel engine of 8 or 12 hp (6 or 9 kW) for docking and maneuvering. The fuel tank holds 7.1 U.S. gallons (27 L; 5.9 imp gal) and the fresh water tank has a capacity of 23.8 U.S. gallons (90 L; 19.8 imp gal).

The design has sleeping accommodation for five people, with a double "V"-berth in the bow cabin, two straight settee berths and one pilot berth in the main cabin around a drop leaf table. The galley is located on the port side just forward of the companionway ladder. The galley is U-shaped and is equipped with a two-burner stove. The head is located opposite the galley on the starboard side. Cabin headroom is 68 in (173 cm).

For sailing downwind the design may be equipped with a symmetrical spinnaker of 564 sq ft (52.4 m^{2}).

The design has a hull speed of 6.47 kn (11.98 km/h).

== Variants ==
Aquila 27 Standard (Shoal Draft)
This cruising-oriented model displaces 5,732 lb (2,600 kg) empty and carries 2,094 lb (950 kg) of iron ballast. The mast has one set of spreaders. The boat has a draft of 4.3 ft (1.3 m) with the shoal draft keel.
Aquila 27 Regatta (Sport)
This lightened racing-oriented model displaces 5,181 lb (2,350 kg) empty and carries 2,205 lb (1,000 kg) of lead ballast. The mast has two sets of spreaders. The boat has a draft of 5.42 ft (1.65 m) with the fin keel.

== See also ==
- List of sailing boat types
