= The Mores of the Russian Clergy =

1928 book by Yefim Grekulov

- Author: Yefim Grekulov
- Original title: Нравы русского духовенства
- Language: Russian
- Genre: Historical, propaganda
- Published: 1928
- Publication place: Soviet Union
- Pages: 96
- ISBN: 978-5904788087

The Mores of the Russian Clergy (Russian: Нравы русского духовенства) is a book by Soviet historian and atheist propagandist Yefim Grekulov, originally published in 1928.

== Content ==
Publication of the book in 2011 contains the following chapters:

- Foreword by Alexander Nevzorov
- Composition of ancient clergy
- Church - the bearer of culture and education
- "The immense upivanie"
- "Prodigal obyadenie"
- "Carnal lust"
- "Sodom misery"
- "Special acquiring"
- Moneylenders from the clergy
- The mores of the clergy in the XIII century

== Reception ==
Candidate of Historical Sciences and associate professor at the Department of Social Sciences and Technologies of the Volga State University of Technology, S. M. Vasina, notes that alongside E. F. Grekulov's other works written in the 1920s–1930s, his book Mores of the Russian Clergy "depicts the Church and the clergy as exploiters, oppressors, and a conservative force of the autocratic state". This view is also shared by Candidates of Historical Sciences L. K. Dribas and I. A. Semin.

Candidate of Historical Sciences N. A. Basova notes that the book is a part of works of the 1920s–1930s that "bear an agitation-propaganda character and do not contain a scientific analysis of facts, the selection of which is also distinguished by a biased attitude," speak of the "anti-people's essence of the Church as a political and ideological enemy of the Soviet state," and "lack a scholarly apparatus".

Candidate of Historical Sciences D. N. Kalashnikov notes that Grekulov's book belongs to works written in the 1920s–1930s where "the clergy is presented as a community of 'oppressors' and 'dependents'".

Candidate of Historical Sciences and senior lecturer at the Department of State and Municipal Administration of the Tambov branch of OLAGS, E. N. Shabelnikova, notes that the book was written in an atheistic vein and with the aim of portraying the Church and clergy "first and foremost as a feudal institution that oppressed the masses not only spiritually, but also economically." Shabelnikova points out that Grekulov's book became one of those studies whose publication "was driven by the beginning of persecutions against the Church," and that "therefore, the main task of the authors boiled down to identifying negative facts in church history".

== Publications ==
- Нравы русского духовенства. — Москва : Атеист, [19--]. — 40 с.
- Нравы русского духовенства. — (Изд. 2-е, исправл.). — [Москва] : Атеист, 1929. — 39 с.
- Нравы русского духовенства. — 3-е изд., доп.. — М.: Атеист, 1929. — 51 с.
- Нравы русского духовенства. — 4-е изд. — Москва : Атеист, [19--]. — 60 с.
- Нравы русского духовенства. — СПб.: Невзоров От Эколь, 2011. — 96 с. — 3000 экз. — ISBN 978-5-904788-08-7.
