= Institute of Scientific Atheism =

Soviet research organization (1964–1991)

Institute of Scientific Atheism (Russian: Институт Научного Атеизма) was a research organization founded in 1964 in Moscow for the coordination of research in atheism conducted research institutes of the Academy of Sciences of the Soviet Union, universities and institutions of the Ministry of Culture.

== History of Institute ==
The Institute was established in accordance with the decision of the CPSU Central Committee, within the framework of the party of scientific institutions - Academy of Social Sciences under the CPSU Central Committee.

=== Directors of the Institute ===
- Aleksandr F. Okulov (1964—1978)
- Pavel K. Kurochkin (1978—1981)
- Viktor I. Garaja (1981—1990)
- Eduard G. Filimonov (1991—1992, as director of the Institute of Religious Studies)

All the director of the institute are doctors of Philosophy science.

== Research ==
The institute conducted a comprehensive study of the problems of scientific atheism and the history of religion, postgraduate study. Employees of the institute published their works in the magazine "Problems of Philosophy", "Science and Religion" (Russian: Наука и религия). In addition, the Institute published its own book "Questions of scientific atheism" (Russian: Вопросы научного атеизма) in volume from 17 to 25 printed pages, is published twice a year with a circulation of 20 thousand copies on average. The publications in this edition brought Soviet and foreign scientists, party functionaries, propagandists of atheism.

The Institute was closed with the collapse of the USSR in 1991.

== See also ==
- League of Militant Atheists
- Marxist-Leninist atheism
- State atheism
- Persecution of Christians in the Soviet Union
