= Aleksandr Okulov =

Soviet scientist (1908–1993)

Alexandr Fedorovich Okulov
- Born: September 12, 1908; Vypolzovo, Kotelnich district, Vyatka province, Russia
- Died: October 6, 1993 (aged 85)
- Awards: Honored Scientist of the RSFSR
- Scientific career
- Fields: History
- Institutions: Institute of Scientific Atheism

Alexandr Fedorovich Okulov (Russian: Александр Фёдорович Окулов; September 12, 1908 – October 6, 1993) was a Soviet and Russian philosopher, specialist in the history of Marxist philosophy, atheism and social philosophy. Doctor of Philosophy, professor. One of the authors of the "Atheist Dictionary" (Russian: Атеистический словарь).

== Background ==
He graduated from the Communist Institute of Journalism (1937), he was also a graduate of GA in the department of history of philosophy. (1950).

In the 1930s and 1940s, he worked as editor of the political department of MTS in the Azov-Black Sea region, the editor of the regional and regional newspaper in the Far East, the secretary of the regional committee of the Sakhalin and Khabarovsk regional committee of the party.

Deputy Director of the IF of the USSR (1951-1964). In 1961-1962 gg. - The editor in chief of the journal "Problems of Philosophy". From 1964 to 1978 - Director of the Institute of Scientific Atheism.

Main research areas: the history of philosophy in Soviet society and foreign philosophy; the philosophical and atheistic legacy of Lenin, the problems of modern clericalism, social, philosophical and sociological problems of religious studies.

He participated in the creation of collective scientific works: "History of Philosophy" (6 m.), "History of the USSR philosophy", Proc. "Questions of scientific atheism", "Scientific-atheistic library" textbook "scientific atheism" (4th ed., 1978), and others.

== Works ==
- The struggle of Lenin and Stalin for the theoretical foundations of the Marxist party. M., 1951;
- About the book Lenin's "Materialism and Empiric". M., 1953;
- Lenin on the ideological origins and the class nature of the Social-Democracy. M., 1954;
- Fighting Plekhanov against the neo-Kantian revision of Marxism // "Problems of Philosophy" 1956. No. 6;
- The struggle of Lenin against revisionism, for the purity of Marxist theory // "Problems of Philosophy" 1958. No. 2;
- The great philosophical work of creative Marxism. [In et al.]. M., 1959;
- The struggle of Lenin against the philosophy of reformism and revisionism. M., 1959;
- Soviet philosophical science and its problems. A short essay. M., 1976;
- The scientific outlook and atheist upbringing. M., 1976;
- Social progress and religion. M., 1982;
- Leninist atheistic heritage and modernity. M., 1986.

== Literature ==
- Алексеев П. В. (2002). "Окулов, Александр Фёдорович". Философы России XIX-XX столетий. Биографии, идеи, труды (4-е изд., перераб. и доп. ed.). М.: Академический проект. p. 1152. ISBN 5-8291-0148-3.
