= Vilikovský =

Vilikovský is a surname. Notable people with the surname include:

- Ján Vilikovský (1937–2023), Slovak translator
- Pavel Vilikovský (1941–2020), Slovak writer
