= Petkus =

Petkus may refer to:

- Viktoras Petkus (1928-2012), Lithuanian political activist and dissident, political prisoner,
- Andrius Petkus (born 1976), Lithuanian sculptor
- Josef Petkus, a member of the fictional Red Guardian team of the Supreme Soviets in Marvel Universe
- Almantas Petkus, Lithuanian politician, Member of the Seimas, 2008–2012
- Petkus, a former municipality, now part of Baruth/Mark, Berlin
- Petkus (variety)
