= Lithuanian Helsinki Group =

Human rights non-governmental organization in the Lithuanian SSR, Soviet Union

- Lietuvos Helsinkio Grupė
- Merged into: Lithuanian Human Rights Association
- Formation: 27 November 1976; 49 years ago
- Founder: Viktoras Petkus; Tomas Venclova; Karolis Garuckas; Eitanas Finkelšteinas; Ona Lukauskaitė-Poškienė
- Type: Non-profit; NGO
- Purpose: Human rights monitoring
- Headquarters: Vilnius, Lithuania
- Members: 41 (total)
- Parent organization: Helsinki Committee for Human Rights

The Lithuanian Helsinki Group (full name: the Public Group to Promote the Implementation of the Helsinki Accords in Lithuania; Lithuanian: Helsinkio susitarimų vykdymui remti Lietuvos visuomeninė grupė) was a dissident organization active in the Lithuanian SSR, one of the republics of the Soviet Union, in 1975–83. Established to monitor the implementation of the Final Act of the Conference on Security and Cooperation in Europe, better known as Helsinki Accords, it was the first human rights organization in Lithuania. The group published over 30 documents that exposed religious repressions, limitations on freedom of movement, political abuse of psychiatry, discrimination of minorities, persecution of human right activists, and other violations of human rights in the Soviet Union. Most of the documents reached the West and were published by other human rights groups. Members of the group were persecuted by the Soviet authorities. Its activities diminished after it lost members due to deaths, emigration, or imprisonment, though it was never formally disbanded. Some of the group's functions were taken over by the Catholic Committee for the Defense of the Rights of Believers, founded by five priests in 1978. Upon his release from prison, Viktoras Petkus reestablished the Lithuanian Helsinki Group in 1988.

== History ==
Inspired by the Moscow Helsinki Group, the Lithuanian grouped was founded by five dissidents of different walks of life: Jesuit priest Karolis Garuckas, Jewish "refusenik" Eitanas Finkelšteinas, poet and deportee Ona Lukauskaitė-Poškienė, twice-imprisoned Catholic dissident Viktoras Petkus, and poet Tomas Venclova. The formation was formally announced in a press conference to foreign journalists from Reuters and Chicago Tribune on November 27 or December 1, 1976 in the apartment of Yuri Orlov (Natan Sharansky acted as an interpreter to English). The group did not have a more formal structure or a defined leader, though Petkus was its unofficial leader and driving force.

The various backgrounds of the founders were intended to serve a wide range interests. The group did not want to become yet another Catholic or nationalistic dissident group; instead it strove to work on fundamental and universal human rights that would attract intelligentsia, city residents, non-Lithuanians, and others. The group did not limit its reports to Lithuania or Lithuanians; for example, it reported on arrests of three Estonians (Mart Nikius, Erik Udam, and Enn Tarto), discrimination of 49 Volga German families living in Radviliškis, and persecution of a Russian Pentecostal living in Vilnius. The group produced not only reports concerning specific individuals, but also reports on broader issue. In 1977, the group produced reports on situation of the former political prisoners, focusing on prohibition to return to Lithuania even after their prison term ended, and the Catholic church. It also sent a report to the Follow-up Meeting of the Conference on Security and Co-operation in Europe in Belgrade (4 October 1977 – 8 March 1978).

In January 1979, Commission on Security and Cooperation in Europe nominated Helsinki Groups of the Soviet Union, including the Lithuanian group, for the Nobel Peace Prize. Petkus hoped to establish a broader Baltic organization that would represent all three Baltic states, but these plans were abandoned after his arrest in August 1977. After the arrest of Petkus, there was a lull in the group's activity. It became more active again in early 1979 and published further documents primarily protesting arrests of various dissidents, including Antanas Terleckas, and statements critical of the Czechoslovak government and the Soviet–Afghan War. However, arrests of four other members effectively discontinued the activities of the Lithuanian Helsinki Group.

The group was reestablished in 1988 when glasnost and perestroika policies allowed freer political expressions. On November 20, 1988, the group admitted three new members Balys Gajauskas, Kazimieras Kryževičius, and Nijolė Sadūnaitė. The group joined the independence movement and published many reports and documents (some 100 documents in 1991 alone). The documents were collected and published in two volumes by the Genocide and Resistance Research Centre of Lithuania in 1999 (ISBN 9986-757-29-0) and by the Lithuanian Human Rights Association in 2006 (ISBN 978-9955-9972-0-7). Many members of the group, including Viktoras Petkus, joined the Lithuanian Human Rights Association, the first official human rights organization established in 1989. The Helsinki Group continues as an official group; in March 2014, it became co-founder of the Lithuanian Human Rights Coordination Centre (Lithuanian: Lietuvos žmogaus teisių koordinavimo centras).

== Membership ==
Tomas Venclova, a son of Antanas Venclova, a prominent Soviet writer, was allowed to emigrate to the United States just two months after the group's formation. Viktoras Petkus was arrested on August 23, 1977. After a trial in 1978, he was sentenced to 10 years in prison and 5 years in exile. He was freed after the introduction of glasnost in 1988. Karolis Garuckas died of cancer on April 5, 1979; Ona Lukauskaitė-Poškienė died on December 4, 1983. Eitan Finkelstein resigned from the group in 1979 and was allowed to emigrate to Israel in December 1983.

Besides the five founding members, the group added six others. Bronius Laurinavičius, a Catholic priest, was admitted in January 1979 but he died in a suspicious traffic accident on November 25, 1981. In November 1979, the group added Algirdas Statkevičius, a physician and former member of the Lithuanian Territorial Defense Force, and Mečislovas Jurevičius, a former Lithuanian partisan. Vytautas Skuodis, a professor of geology, also joined the group but was arrested in November 1979 for the possession of a 300-page manuscript titled Spiritual Genocide of Lithuania. On February 14, 1980, Statkevičius was arrested and transferred to a psychiatric hospital. The group protested the arrests and wanted to admit Vytautas Vaičiūnas, a worker, but Jurevičius and Vaičiūnas were arrested on March 25, 1981. Therefore, in early 1981, Lukauskaitė-Poškienė was as the only member of the group, but due to poor health she was unable to continue group's activities.

In the late 1980s and early 1990s, the reestablished group added many new members. In total, the group had 41 official members plus about 84 unofficial members. Among them were Vytautas Bogušis, Gintautas Iešmantas, Nijolė Sadūnaitė, and Kazys Saja.

=== Imprisoned members ===
The following members of the Group were arrested and sentenced by the Soviet authorities:

- Viktoras Petkus was sentenced on 13 July 1978, to three years in prison, seven years in special regimen camp and five years of internal exile for "anti-Soviet agitation and propaganda";
- Algirdas Statkevičius was sentenced on 11 August 1980, to forcible psychiatric treatment after being arrested on 14 February 1980, reportedly for "anti-Soviet activities";
- Vytautas Skuodis was sentenced on 22 December 1980, to seven years strict regimen camp and five years of internal exile for "anti-Soviet agitation and propaganda";
- Mečislovas Jurevičius was sentenced on 25 June 1981, to three years of strict regimen camp for "organization of religious processions";
- Vytautas Vaičiūnas was sentenced on 25 June 1981, to two and half years of general regimen camp for "organization of religious processions".
