= Chronicle of the Catholic Church in Lithuania =

1972–1989 Catholic samizdat periodical in the Lithuanian SSR, Soviet Union

Cover of the Chronicle of the Catholic Church in Lithuania

The Chronicle of the Catholic Church in Lithuania (Lithuanian: Lietuvos katalikų bažnyčios kronika or LKB kronika) was the longest-running and best-known samizdat periodical in the Lithuanian SSR, one of the republics of the Soviet Union. Following the example of the Russian Chronicle of Current Events, the Lithuanian Chronicle was published from 19 March 1972 to 19 March 1989 by Catholic priests and nuns. In total, 81 issues appeared. It focused on repressions against Catholics in Lithuania, but also included reports of other violations of human rights in the Soviet Union. Selections from its reports regularly appeared in the Moscow-based Chronicle of Current Events; in turn items from Russia and Ukraine were translated into Lithuanian.

The Chronicle inspired the Chronicle of the Catholic Church in Ukraine, issued from 1984 to 1987 by the Ukrainian Greek Catholic Church.

== Contributors and editors ==
The writers and the publishers were routinely interrogated, arrested, and imprisoned by the KGB, including its founder and first editor Sigitas Tamkevičius. Between 1973 and 1983, a total of 17 people were arrested (2 priests, 4 nuns, and 11 secular persons).

After Tamkevičius' arrest in 1983, the Chronicle was edited by Jonas Boruta. Other writers and collaborators included Petras Plumpa, Nijolė Sadūnaitė, Gerarda Elena Šuliauskaitė, Bernadeta Mališkaitė, Kazimieras Ambrasas. The texts were usually pessimistic and reflecting siege mentality.

== Circulation at home and abroad ==
The Chronicle was reproduced using a typewriter and copied with primitive self-made machines. Therefore, the initial circulation was only about 100–300 copies.

With the help of Russian dissidents (Sergei Kovalev, Gleb Yakunin, and others) and Western visitors (who agreed to take souvenirs with photographic films of the Chronicle hidden inside), copies of the Chronicle were smuggled across the Iron Curtain. In the United States, the Chronicle was translated and published by various Lithuanian American organizations. The text was also read on Vatican Radio, Voice of America, Radio Liberty.
