= Eugen Strouhal =

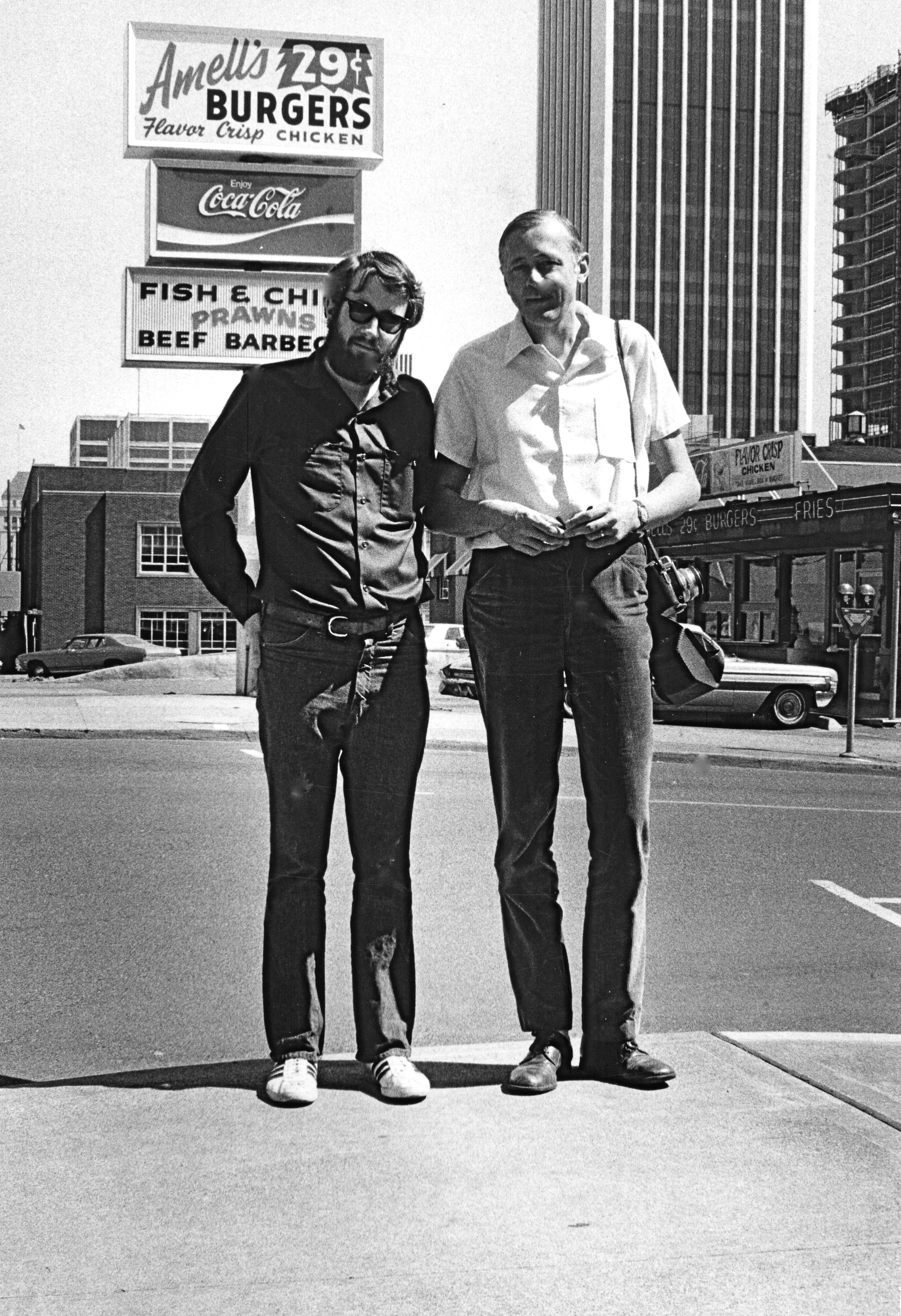
- Strouhal (right) in 1975 in Oregon
- Born: 24 January 1931; Prague, Czechoslovakia
- Died: 20 October 2016 (aged 85); Prague, Czech Republic
- Education: Charles University (1956)
- Occupations: Anthropologist, archaeologist, physician, Egyptologist, paleopathologist
- Writing career
- Pen name: Evžen Strouhal

Eugen Strouhal (also called Evžen Strouhal; 24 January 1931 – 20 October 2016) was a Czech anthropologist, archaeologist, physician and museum curator. He contributed to the establishment of the scientific field of paleopathology and was mainly involved in research on Ancient Egypt. He worked at the Czechoslovak Institute of Egyptology of Charles University (today the Czech Institute of Egyptology), subsequently at the Náprstek Museum of Asian, African and American Cultures, and later also at the First Faculty of Medicine of Charles University in Prague. Since he was a practicising Catholic who advocated an ecumenical approach to Christianity and rejected joining the Communist Czechoslovak Party, Strouhal "was not considered for a higher ranking position at that time [in his career]" by the ruling communist Czechoslovak government.

== Life and work ==
Eugen Strouhal was born in Prague, Czechoslovakia on 24 January 1931 into a scientific family. Both his parents were doctors. His grandfather, Vincenc Strouhal, was a leading figure in the field of experimental physics, and the founder of Czech experimental physics, dedicated one of his last books to his biography. In 1956, he graduated from the Faculty of General Medicine at Charles University in Prague and three years later from the Faculty of Philosophy and History.

== Career ==
From 1956 to 1957, he worked as a doctor in Františkovy Lázně. Subsequently, in 1957, he joined the Institute of Biology of the Faculty of Medicine of Charles University in Plzeň as an assistant professor, where he worked until 1960. Here he began his teaching activities, which were very popular with students. Then he worked briefly at the inpatient department of the Endocrinology Research Institute in Prague-Motol. From 1961, he became a member of the Czechoslovak Institute of Egyptology of the Faculty of Arts of Charles University in Prague, where he worked until 1968. During these years, he also taught anthropology and archaeology to foreign students in English and French at the University of 17 November.

== Political background ==
Due to the events of the Prague Spring of 1968, he was pressured to join the Communist Party of Czechoslovakia in order to remain at Charles University. He refused this and decided to take a job at the Náprstek Museum of Asian, African and American Cultures, where he was allowed to continue his work. He worked there as a curator of collections from 1969 to 1992. There, he was instrumental in continuing expeditions and in establishing and organizing collections of prehistoric and ancient artefacts from the region of Egypt. He returned to Charles University as a teacher after the Velvet Revolution in 1989. He began teaching at the First Faculty of Medicine in 1990 at its Institute of the History of Medicine and Foreign Languages, of which he was the head from 1993 (in the same year he ended his employment at the Náprstek Museum) to 1998 when he stepped down as the head of this institution. and then as its professor emeritus. He was instrumental in the rebirth of this institute.

== Career achievements ==
He transferred a significant part of the ancient Egyptian mummies to the Náprstek Museum. In 1971, he organized the exhibition Ancient Egyptian Mummies, which he examined together with the radiologist Luboš Vyhnánek. This collaboration resulted in the publication Egyptian Mummies in Czechoslovak Collections, published in 1979, which was one of the most recognized works of its type. Thanks to his popularity among students, he was instrumental in promoting paleopathology as an individual component of the medical program. He organized several conferences at the Faculty of Medicine of Charles University, such as the Conference on the History of Medicine in 1996 and the 12th Congress of the Paleopathological Association in Prague and Plzeň in 1998.

In 2004, he recovered from a serious, life-threatening illness. He subsequently decided to leave Charles University, and for his services to this institute he was awarded the title of professor emeritus. He continued to devote himself to the study and research of paleopathology.

== Expeditions to Egypt ==
From 1961 to 1965, he repeatedly participated in expeditions to Nubia as part of a UNESCO program that sought to save monuments threatened by the waters of the newly built Aswan High Dam. Here, he participated primarily in the research of burial grounds from the late Roman and early Byzantine periods at Wadi Qitna and Kalabsha South. These expeditions inspired him to organize another series of research expeditions, which took place from 1965 to 1967, investigating the population resettled from the area flooded by the Aswan Dam. He participated in the Czechoslovak archaeological research in Abusir near Cairo. In 1961, 1966 and 1968, he was directly involved in the excavation of the Ptahshepses mastaba, which is one of the largest non-royal tombs in Egypt from the 3rd millennium BC. He continued to participate in expeditions to Abusir even after leaving the Faculty of Arts at Charles University in 2004. He also collaborated with the British-Dutch expedition in northern Saqqara and the Austrian expedition in the Nubian Sajal.

== Contributions to paleopathology ==
Strouhal was one of the greatest scientists in this field. He co-founded the Paleopathological Association (Detroit 1982). He was primarily concerned with evidence of tumor growth and the research of the physical remains of historical figures of ancient Egypt, especially rulers and members of their families—and also secondarily in the ancient world.

== Publications ==
Eugen Strouhal "was the author of sixteen books and 350 articles" in his career. The Following Article gives a Comprehensive List of his publications from 1958 to 2010 with a Further Updated List from 2010 to 2014 which includes his important 2010 paper on the mysterious royal mummy in Tomb KV55 given in the Paragraph 'Selected accessible PDF publications' below.

== Selected accessible PDF publications ==
- Eugen Strouhal & Luboš Vyhnánek, Egyptian Mummies in Czechoslovak Collections, SBORNtK NARODN1HO MUZEA V PRAZE (Collection of the National Museum in Prague), Volumen XXXV B (1979), No. 1- 4 ARCHIVED
- Eugen Strouhal & Alena Němečková & Přemysl Klír & Jaromír Tesař, Princess Khekeretnebty and Tisethor: Anthropological Analysis Anthropologie Volume 22, Issue 2, 1984. pp.171-183 ARCHIVED
- Eugen Strouhal & Gae Callendar, A Profile of Queen Mutnodjmet (Download Link), Bulletin of the Australian Centre for Egyptology (BACE) 3 1992. pp.67-75
- Eugen Strouhal & Ladislav Bareš, SECONDARY СЕМЕТERY IN THE MASTАВА OF PTAHSHEPSES AT ABUSIR, Charles University, Prague, 1993 ARCHIVED
- Eugen Strouhal, Physical Features and Disease of a Middle Kingdom Official ANTHROPOLOGIE 31 Vol.1-2, 1993, pp.25-34 ARCHIVED
- Eugen Strouhal, Traces of a Smallpox Epidemic in the Family of Ramesses V in the Egyptian 20th Dynasty, Anthropologie (1962-) Vol.34, No.3 (1996), pp. 315-319 ARCHIVED
- Ladislav Bares (with a chapter by Květa Smoláriková and an appendix by Eugen Strouhal), Abusir IV:The Shaft Tomb of Udjahorresnet at Abusir, Universitas Carolina Pragensis, 1999 ARCHIVED
- Eugen Strouhal, Luboš Vyhnánek, M.F. Gaballah, S.R. Saunders, W. Woelfli, G. Bonani & Alena Němečková, IDENTIFICATION OF ROYAL SKELETAL REMAINS FROM EGYPTIAN PYRAMIDS Anthropologie Vol.39 (2001), pp.15-23 ARCHIVED
- Eugen Strouhal, Luboš Vyhnánek's Contribution to Czech and Slovak Palaeopathology and Anthropology Anthropologie 39, Vol.1, 2001 pp.1-8 ARCHIVED
- Eugen Strouhal & J. Maarten & Rene Van Walsem & Barbara G. Aston, Preliminary Report on the Leiden Excavations at Saqqara; Season 2001: The Tomb of Meryneith JEOL 37 (2001-2002), pp.71-89 ARCHIVED
- Miroslav Bárta (with a contribution by Viktor Černý and Eugen Strouhal), ABUSIR V: The Cemeteries at Abusir South I, Czech National Centre for Egyptology 2001 ARCHIVED
- Eugen Strouhal, RELATION OF IUFAA TO PERSONS FOUND BESIDE HIS SHAFT-TOMB AT ABUSIR (EGYPT) Anthropologie, Vol.40, No.1, 2002, pp. 37–50
- Eugen Strouhal, Examination of Mummies from the Tomb of Iufaa at Abusir (Egypt), Journal of Biological Research, Vol LXXX No.1, 2005, pp. 179–183 ARCHIVED
- Eugen Strouhal & Hans Barnard, Wadi Qitna Revisited, ANNALS OF THE NAPRSTEK MUSEUM 25 .-"PRAGUE, 2004 ARCHIVED
- Eugen Strouhal, Anthropology of the Egyptian Nubian Men Anthropologie Volume 45, Issue 2-3, 2007. pp.105-245 ARCHIVED
- Eugen Strouhal & Alena Němečková, History and palaeopathology of malignant tumours, Anthropologie Volume 47, Issue 3, 2009. pp.289-294 ARCHIVED
- Eugen Strouhal, Biological age of skeletonized mummy from Tomb KV55 at Thebes, Anthropologie Volume 48, No.2 (2010), pp. 97–112 ARCHIVED (On the Royal Mummy in Tomb KV55)
