= Vilenica International Literary Festival =

Slovenian literary festival

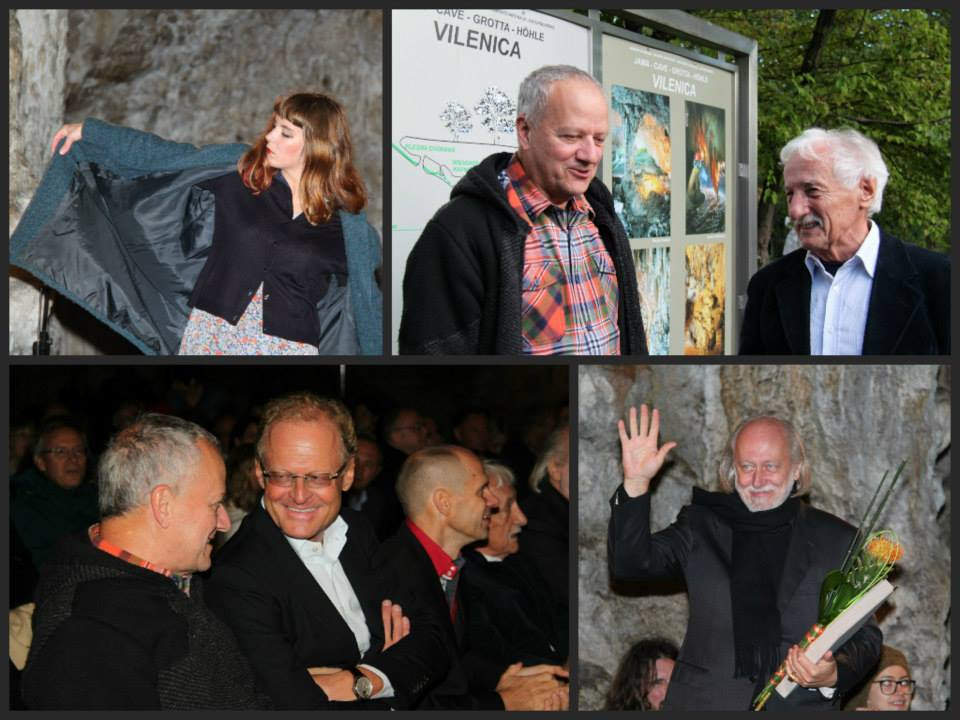
- Photographs from the 2014 edition of Vilenica International Literary Festival
- Genre: Central European literature
- Begins: early September
- Frequency: annual
- Locations: Vilenica Cave and other locations in Slovenia
- Inaugurated: 1986; 40 years ago
- Organiser: Slovene Writers' Association and the Cultural Centre Vilenica
- Website: http://vilenica.si/

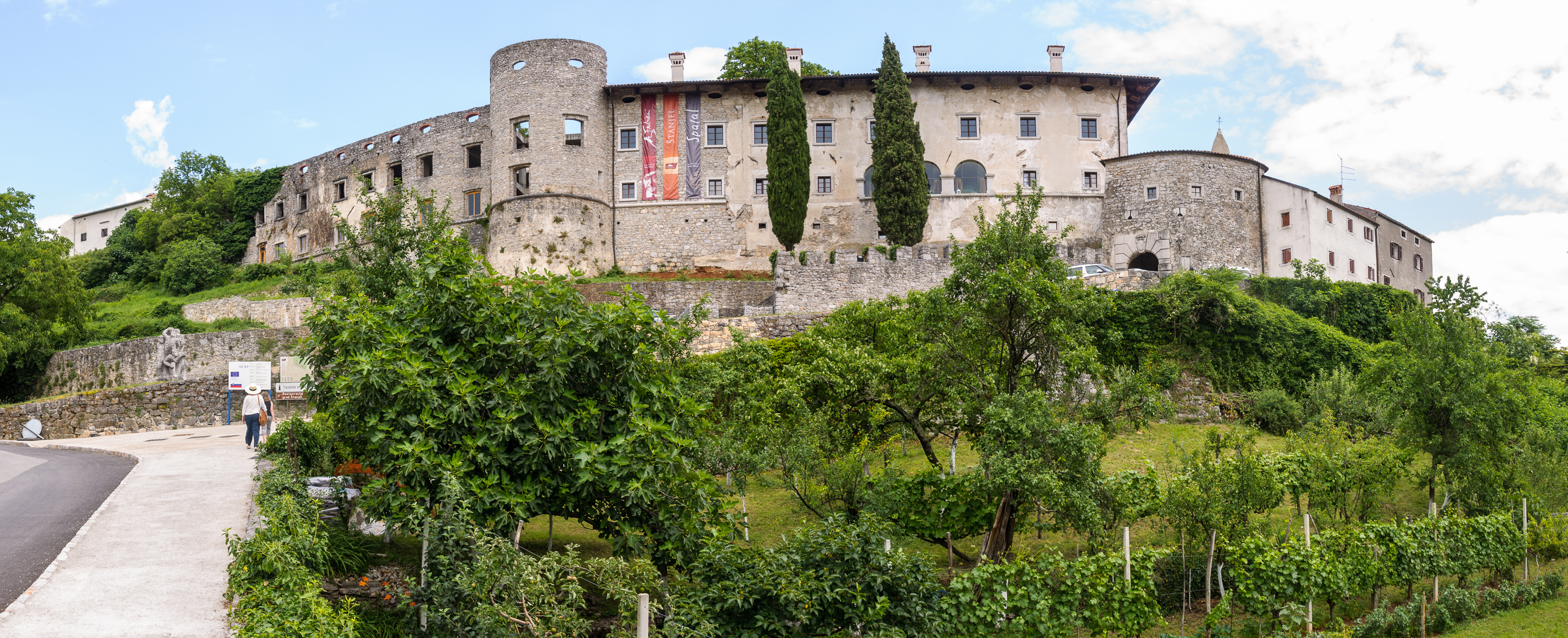
The Crystal Vilenica award ceremony takes place in Štanjel Castle

Vilenica International Literary Festival (Slovene: Mednarodni literarni festival Vilenica) is a festival dedicated to literature that was founded in 1986 in Slovenia. It takes place annually in several locations on the Karst Plateau in the Slovene Littoral, including inside Vilenica Cave. It is arranged by the Slovene Writers' Association together with the Cultural Centre Vilenica from Sežana. The highlight of the festival is the awarding of the Vilenica International Literary Prize to a Central European author for "outstanding achievements in the field of literature and essay writing."

== Background and events ==
The festival was arranged for the first time in 1986 and was co-founded by Veno Taufer, who is still a member of the prize awarding jury. Originally it was simply called "Vilenica Festival" but since 2005 it is formally called "Vilenica International Literary Festival". From the outset, it was the outspoken purpose of the organisers to promote "cultural pluralism, tolerance and non-aggression", and at that time to provide an opportunity for the literary community from both sides of the Iron Curtain to meet and exchange ideas.

According to the statutes of the festival, it aims to be a "gathering of poets, writers, dramatists and essayists as well as editors, publishers and cultural managers and translators from Central European countries." Central Europe is loosely defined by the festival organisers as ranging "from the Baltic to the Adriatic, from Bern to Belgrade". The statutes notes that participants from countries outside Central Europe also are welcome to the festival. The official languages of the festival are Slovene, German and English. The festival incorporates many different events such as book readings in several different locations across Slovenia, discussions, seminars, a book fair and so on. The highlight of the festival is the ceremony in which the Vilenica International Literary Prize is awarded to a winner, announced beforehand, for "outstanding achievements in the field of literature and essay writing". The prize consists of a monetary gift of 10,000 euros (in 2016) and in addition, a book by the author is translated into Slovene and published in the country. The winner is chosen by a jury consisting of experts in the field of literature. Financial support for the award is given by the Government of Slovenia and the Municipality of Sežana, as well as by private sponsors. Apart from the main prize, two other awards are also handed out under the auspices of the festival. The Crystal Vilenica award is similarly to the main prize awarded to an author from Central Europe, but by a jury consisting of the festival guests and not the organisers. The winner is awarded a minor piece of art and an invitation to participate at the Cúirt International Festival of Literature in Galway, Ireland. The Young Vilenica award is given by the Cultural Centre Vilenica to three young writers from different age categories. The winners are awarded crystal pens and get their work published in the "Young Vilenica Almanac". The winners also get the opportunity to participate at the International Poetry Festival in Limerick, also on Ireland.

The festival takes place in several locations, including inside Vilenica Cave near the villages of Lokev and Lipica on the Karst Plateau in the Slovene Littoral. The main event of the festival, the ceremony of awarding the Vilenica International Literary Prize, takes place inside the cave. The award ceremony for the Crystal Vilenica prize is inside Štanjel Castle. The festival usually takes place in early September.

== Vilenica International Literary Prize winners ==
Recipients of the Vilenica International Literary Prize, the most prestigious prize given at the festival.

| Year | Picture | Laureate | Country |
|---|---|---|---|
| 1986 | | Fulvio Tomizza | Italy |
| 1987 | | Peter Handke | Austria |
| 1988 | | Péter Esterházy | Hungary |
| 1989 | | Jan Skácel | Czech Republic |
| 1990 | | Tomas Venclova | Lithuania |
| 1991 | | Zbigniew Herbert | Poland |
| 1992 | | Milan Kundera | Czech Republic/France |
| 1993 | | Libuše Moníková | Czech Republic/Germany |
| 1994 | | Josip Osti | Bosnia and Herzegovina |
| 1995 | | Adolf Muschg | Switzerland |
| 1996 | | Adam Zagajewski | Poland |
| 1997 | | Pavel Vilikovský | Slovakia |
| 1998 | | Péter Nádas | Hungary |
| 1999 | | Erica Pedretti | Switzerland |
| 2000 | | Slavko Mihalić | Croatia |
| 2001 | | Jaan Kaplinski | Estonia |
| 2002 | | Ana Blandiana | Romania |
| 2003 | | Mirko Kovač | Croatia |
| 2004 | | Brigitte Kronauer | Germany |
| 2005 | | Ilma Rakusa and Karl-Markus Gauß | Switzerland (Rakusa) and Austria (Gauß) |
| 2006 | | Miodrag Pavlović | Serbia |
| 2007 | | Goran Stefanovski | Republic of Macedonia |
| 2008 | | Andrzej Stasiuk | Poland |
| 2009 | | Claudio Magris | Italy |
| 2010 | | Dževad Karahasan | Bosnia and Herzegovina |
| 2011 | | Mircea Cărtărescu | Romania |
| 2012 | | David Albahari | Serbia |
| 2013 | | Olga Tokarczuk | Poland |
| 2014 | | László Krasznahorkai | Hungary |
| 2015 | | Jáchym Topol | Czech Republic |
| 2016 | | Dubravka Ugrešić | Croatia |
| 2017 | | Yurii Andrukhovych | Ukraine |
| 2018 | | Ilija Trojanow | Bulgaria/Germany |
| 2019 | | Dragan Velikić | Serbia |
| 2020 | | Mila Haugová | Slovakia |
| 2021 | | Josef Winkler | Austria |
| 2022 | | Amanda Aizpuriete | Latvia |
| 2023 | | Ottó Tolnai | Serbia/Hungary |
| 2024 | | Miljenko Jergović | Bosnia and Herzegovina/Croatia |
| 2025 | | Georgi Gospodinov | Bulgaria |
| 2026 | | Serhiy Zhadan | Ukraine |
