= Vilenica Cave =

Cave in Sežana, Slovenia

Vilenica
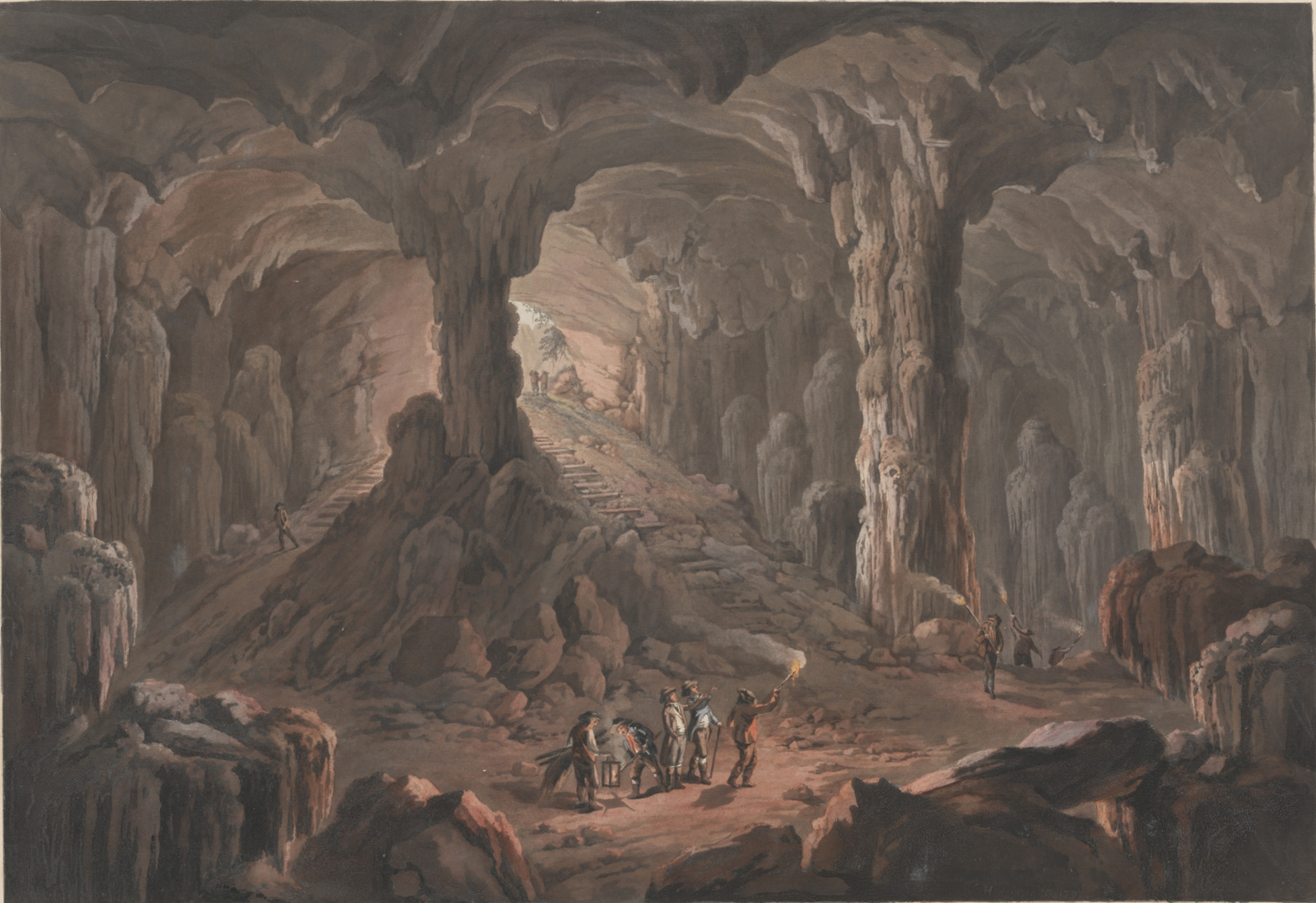
- Depiction of Vilenica Cave by the Austrian painter Ferdinand Runk (1810)

- Location within Slovenia
- Coordinates: 45°40′28″N 13°54′42″E

Vilenica Cave or Vilenica Cave at Lokev (Slovene: Jama Vilenica pri Lokvi) is the oldest show cave in Europe. The first tourists to the cave were recorded in 1633. It is located next to the village of Lokev in the municipality of Sežana on the Karst Plateau in southwestern Slovenia.

== Natural environment ==
Vilenica Cave is more than 1,300 metres (4,300 ft) in length, with a depth of 180 m (590 ft), but tourists are only allowed into the first 450 m (1,480 ft) of the cave.

== History ==
Until the mid-19th century it was known as the biggest, most beautiful, and most frequently visited cave of the Classical Karst. It attracted artists such as Ferdinand Runk and Peter Fendi, who was awarded a gold medal in 1821 for his oil painting of the cave. Later it was surpassed by Postojna Cave.

Since 1986, the annual Vilenica International Literary Festival has taken place in the cave and in the towns and villages of the Karst and elsewhere. The event most commonly happens in the beginning of September. The central part of the festival is the conferral of the Vilenica Prize for literature by the Slovene Writers' Association. The award is bestowed in the cave's Plesna Hall (Plesna dvorana) on an author from Central Europe for his or her achievements in literary and essay writing.

== See also ==
- List of deepest Dinaric caves
- List of longest Dinaric caves
