= Ján Vilikovský =

Slovak translator and diplomat (1937–2023)

- Born: 13 July 1937; Palúdzka, Czechoslovakia
- Died: 5 May 2023 (aged 85); Bratislava, Slovakia
- Occupation(s): Translator and diplomat
- Known for: Being the first Slovak Ambassador to the UK

Ján Vilikovský (13 July 1937 – 5 May 2023) was a Slovak translator and diplomat who served as the first Ambassador of Slovakia to the United Kingdom from 1992 to 1996.

== Biography ==
Vilikovský was born on 13 July 1937 in the village of Palúdzka, which is now a part of the town of Liptovský Mikuláš and grew up in Bratislava. His parents were teachers. His younger brother, Pavel Vilikovský, was a writer.

Vilikovský studied English and Slovak language at the Comenius University in English and Slovak language in 1959. Following his graduation he taught at the University of 17 November and, following its abolition, at the Comenius University. Following the end of his tenure as the Ambassador, he taught at the Matej Bel University.

Vilikovský translated many classics from the American literature, including writings by Norman Mailer, William Faulkner, Ernest Hemingway and F. Scott Fitzgerald to Slovak. For his translations, he received many professional acknowledgements, including the Ján Hollý prize. He published several translation textbooks.

In the early 1990s, he contributed to the development of relations between the newly independent Slovakia and the United Kingdom as the first Ambassador of Slovakia to the Court of St James's.

Vilikovský died in Bratislava on 5 May 2023, at the age of 85.
