= Tomas Venclova =

Lithuanian poet and scholar (born 1937)

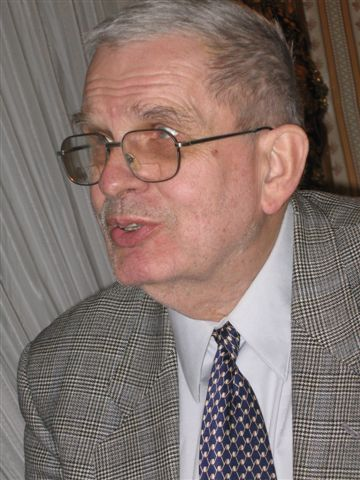
- Venclova in Warsaw, 20 March 2007
- Born: 11 September 1937 (age 88); Klaipėda, Lithuania
- Citizenship: Lithuanian; American
- Education: Vilnius University
- Occupations: philologist, essayist, writer, poet
- Writing career
- Notable awards: Lithuanian National Prize, Petrarca-Preis, Vilenica International Literary Prize, Zbigniew Herbert Award, Doctor Honoris Causa of Vilnius University

Tomas Venclova (born 11 September 1937) is a Lithuanian poet, prose writer, scholar, philologist and translator of literature. He is one of the five founding members of the Lithuanian Helsinki Group. In 1977, following his dissident activities, he was forced to emigrate and was deprived of his Soviet citizenship. Since 1980, he has taught Russian and Polish literature at Yale University. Considered a major figure in world literature, he has received many awards, including the Prize of Two Nations (received jointly with Czesław Miłosz), and The Person of Tolerance of the Year Award from the Sugihara Foundation, among other honors.

== Life ==
Tomas Venclova was born in Klaipėda in 1937. His father, Antanas, was a poet and later a Soviet politician. Tomas was educated at Vilnius University. He was one of the five founding members of the Lithuanian Helsinki Group, and took part in Lithuanian and Russian dissident movements. He became friends with poets Anna Akhmatova and Boris Pasternak, as well as Natalya Gorbanevskaya and Joseph Brodsky. In Vilnius, he translated Baudelaire, T.S. Eliot, W.H. Auden, Robert Frost, Osip Mandelstam, Anna Akhmatova, Boris Pasternak, and other authors into Lithuanian. In Lithuania he was forbidden to publish his own work, except in samizdat, although one volume appeared in 1972, entitled A Sign of Speech. In 1977, following his dissident activities, he was forced to emigrate.

He was invited by Czesław Miłosz to teach at the University of California at Berkeley. He did not return to Lithuania until its independence in 1991. Between 1980 and 2012, he has taught Russian and Polish literature at Yale University.

He has published over twenty books including volumes of poetry, literary criticism, political commentary, literary biography, translation and books on Vilnius. His work has been translated into many languages including by Czesław Miłosz into Polish, and by Joseph Brodsky into Russian. He is active in the contemporary cultural life of Lithuania, and is one of its most well-respected figures.

He lived in New Haven (Connecticut, United States), in the past also temporarily in Vilnius and Kraków. In 2018, after retiring from Yale University, Venclova and his wife moved to Vilnius.

== Selected honors and awards ==
- 2025 Baltic Assembly Prize for Literature
- 2023 Zbigniew Herbert International Literary Award (Poland)
- 2018 Doctor Honoris Causa of Göttingen University (Germany)
- 2017 Doctor Honoris Causa of Tbilisi University (Georgia)
- 2017 Doctor Honoris Causa of Vilnius University (Lithuania)
- 2017 HOMER - The European Medal of Poetry and Art – (Tbilisi)
- 2014 Petrarca-Prize (Germany)
- 2013 Honorary Citizen of Vilnius, Lithuania
- 2012 Lithuanian Cultural Prize
- 2012 Lithuanian Diplomacy Star from the Lithuanian Ministry of Foreign Affairs (for contributions to Lithuanian Human Rights)
- 2012 Person of Tolerance of the Year Award, Sugihara-Diplomats for Life Foundation
- 2011 Qinhai International Poetry Prize (China)
- 2008 Baltic Star (Russia)
- 2007 Member, Polish Academy of Arts and Sciences
- 2005 Jotvingiai Prize (Lithuania)
- 2005 New Culture of New Europe Prize
- 2002 Prize of Two Nations (received jointly with Czesław Miłosz)
- 2001 Borderland Award (Poland)
- 2000 Lithuanian National Prize
- 1990 Vilenica International Literary Prize (Slovenia)

== Selected bibliography ==
Books written in Lithuanian

- Visi eilėraščiai: 1956–2010. Collected Poems. Vilnius: Lietuvių literatūros ir tautosakos institutas, 2010. 404 p.
- Vilnius: asmeninė istorija. Vilnius: R. Paknio leidykla, 2011. 200 p.
- Kitaip: poezijos vertimų rinktinė. Vilnius: Lietuvos rašytojų sąjungos leidykla, 2006. 432 p.
- Vilniaus vardai. Vilnius: R. Paknio leidykla, 2006. 333 p.
- Sankirta: Eilėraščiai. Vilnius: Lietuvos rašytojų sąjungos leidykla, 2005. 80 p.
- Ligi Lietuvos 10 000 kilometrų. Vilnius: Baltos lankos, 2003. 236 p.
- Vilnius: Vadovas po miestą. Vilnius: R. Paknio leidykla, 2001. 216 p.
- Manau, kad… Pokalbiai su Tomu Venclova. Vilnius: Baltos lankos, 2000. 320 p.
- Rinktinė. Vilnius: Baltos lankos, 1999. 216 p.
- Reginys iš alėjos: eilėraščiai. Vilnius: Baltos lankos, 1998. 64 p.
- Pašnekesys žiemą: eilėraščiai ir vertimai. Vilnius: Vaga Publishers, 1991. 376 p.
- Vilties formos: eseistika ir publicistika. Vilnius: Lietuvos rašytojų sąjungos leidykla, 1991. 544 p.
- Tankėjanti šviesa: eilėraščiai. Chicago: Algimanto Mackaus knygų leidimo fondas, AM&M Publications, 1990. 72 p.
- Tekstai apie tekstus. Chicago: Algimanto Mackaus knygų leidimo fondas, 1985. 240 p.
- Lietuva pasaulyje: publicistika. Chicago: Akademinės skautijos leidykla, 1981. 292 p.
- 98 eilėraščiai. Chicago: Algimanto Mackaus knygų leidimo fondas, 1977. 142 p.
- Kalbos ženklas: eilėraščiai. Vilnius: Vaga, 1972. 64 p.
- Golemas, arba dirbtinis žmogus: pokalbiai apie kibernetiką. Vilnius, 1965. 272 p.
- Raketos, planetos ir mes. Vilnius: Valstybinė grožinės literatūros leidykla, 1962. 168 p.
- Lietuvos istorija visiems, I tomas. Vilnius: R. Paknio leidykla, 2018, 336 p.
- Lietuvos istorija visiems, II tomas. Vilnius: R. Paknio leidykla, 2019, 380 p.*

Books written in Russian

- Собеседники на пиру. Литературные эссе. Москва, НЛО, 2012, 624 с.
- Статьи о Бродском. Москва: Baltrus, Новое издательство, 2005. 176 с.
- Собеседники на пиру. Статьи о русской литературе. Vilnius: Baltos lankos,1997, 256 c.
- Неустойчивое равновесие: восемь русских поэтических текстов. New Haven: YCIAS, 1986.

Books written in English

- Magnetic North: Conversations with Tomas Venclova (Rochester, N. Y.: University of Rochester Press, 2017).
- Aleksander Wat: Life and Art of an Iconoclast. New Haven and London: Yale University Press, 1996. 370 p.

Books in English translation

- Vilnius. A Personal History. The Sheep Meadow Press, 2009, 276 p.
- The Junction: Selected Poems. Edited by Ellen Hinsey. Bloodaxe Books, 2008.
- Vilnius. Vilnius. R. Paknio leidykla, 2001. 216 p.
- Forms of Hope: Essays. The Sheep Meadow Press, 1999 [paperback 2003], 286 p.
- Winter Dialogue. Northwestern University Press, 1997 [paperback 1999], 148 p.

Books in German translation

- Gespräch im Winter: Gedichte. Frankfurt am Main: Suhrkamp Verlag, 2007
- Vilnius. Eine Stadt in Europa. Frankfurt am Main: Suhrkamp Verlag, 2006
- Vilnius: Stadtfuehrer. Vilnius: R. Paknio leidykla, 2002
- Guenter Grass, Czesław Miłosz, Wisława Szymborska, Tomas Venclova. Die Zukunft der Erinnerung. Goettingen: Steidl, 2001
- Vor der Tuer das Ende der Welt: Gedichte. Hamburg: Rospo Verlag, 2000

Books in Russian translation

- Metelinga: Стихотворения и не только / Пер. и сост. А. Герасимовой. — М.: Пробел-2000, Umka-Press, 2017.
- Вильнюс: город в Европе. Пер. с лит. Марии Чепайтите. СПб. Изд-во Ивана Лимбаха, 2012
- Негатив белизны. Стихи разных лет/ На русском языке с параллельным литовским текстом. М.: Новое издательство, 2008
- Гранёный воздух. Стихотворения. Москва: ОГИ, Дом Юргиса Балтрушайтиса, 2002
- Свобода и правда. Москва: Издательская группа «Прогресс», 1999

Books in Swedish translation

- Former av hopp: Essaer 1976–2001. Kristianstad: Ariel/Ellerstroms, 2001
- Samtal vintertid: Dikter 1956–2000. Satarod/Malmo: Ariel, 2000

Books in Polish translation

- Czesław Miłosz, Tomas Venclova, Powroty do Litwy. Returns to Lithuania. Warszawa: Zeszyty Literackie, 2011
- Z dzienników podróży. Warszawa: Zeszyty Literackie, 2010
- Opisać Wilno. Warszawa: Fundacja Zeszytów Literackich, 2006.
- Niezniszczalny rytm — eseje o literaturze. Pogranicze, 2002
- Wilno: Przewodnik. Vilnius: R. Paknio leidykla, 2001
- Rozmowa w zimie. Warszawa: Zeszyty Literackie, 2001
- Eseje. Publicystyka. Pogranicze, 2001
- Aleksander Wat. Obrazoburca. Przeł. J. Goślicki. Kraków: Wydawnictwo Literackie, 1997
- Rozmowa w zimie. Paris-Kraków: Zeszyty Literackie-Oficyna Literacka, 1991
- Sześć wierszy. Lublin: Wydawnictwo FIS, 1991
- Siedem wierszy. Warszawa: Wydawnictwo S, 1986
- Czesław Miłosz, Tomas Venclova, Dialog o Wilnie. Warszawa: Niezależna Oficyna Wydawnicza, 1981

Books in Hungarian Translation

- Vilnius egy város Európában (translated by Tölgyesi Beatrix). Budapest: Európa Könykviadó, 2009
- Litvánok és... . Budapest: Európa Könyvkiadó, 2003
- Mondjátok meg Fortinbrasnak. Budapest: Európa Könyvkiadó, 1992

Books in Ukrainian Translation

- Передчуття і пророцтва Східної Європи. Дух і літера, 2016

Books in Finnish translation

- Vilna: Kaupungin tarina. Tampere: Jagellonica-kulttuuriyhdistys ry, 2012

Books in Italian translation

- Cinquantuno poesie e una lettera (In forma di parole, 2003, No. 1 Bologna)

Books in Chinese translation

- Selected Poems. Xining: Qinghai Renmin Press, 2011

Books in Portuguese translation

- Literatura lituana (Sinopse). New York: Lithuanian National Foundation, Inc., 1979

Books in Slovenian translation

- Čistost soli. Ljubljana: Društvo slovenskih pisateljev, 1991

Books in Albanian translation

- Dialog ne dimer: Poezi te zgjedhura. Tirane: Aleph, 2005
