= Lokev, Sežana =

Lokev Lokev na Krasu
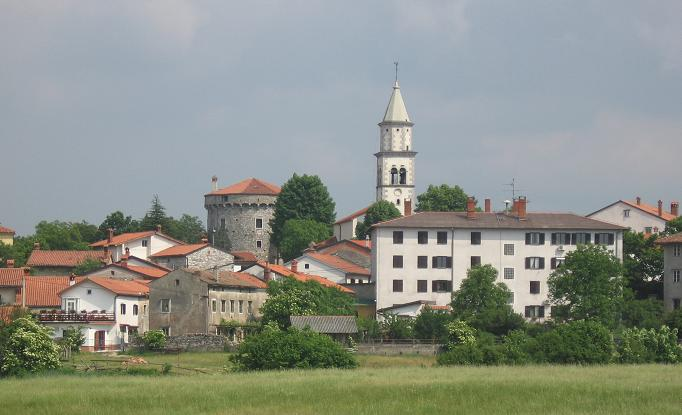

- Location in Slovenia
- Coordinates: 45°39′42.16″N 13°55′45.63″E
- Country: Slovenia
- Traditional region: Littoral
- Statistical region: Coastal–Karst
- Municipality: Sežana

Area
  - Total: 14.25 km^{2} (5.50 sq mi)
- Elevation: 449.5 m (1,475 ft)

Population (2002)
  - Total: 737

Lokev (pronounced [ˈloːkɛu̯]; also Lokev na Krasu; Italian: Corgnale, Corniale, or Loque; German: Hülben) is a settlement in the Municipality of Sežana in the Littoral region of Slovenia, close to the border with Italy.

== Name ==
The name Lokev refers to a large pond where travelers drank and watered their donkeys. Lokev and similar names (e.g., Lokve, Lokvica, Lokovica) are derived from the Slovene common noun lokva 'pond, pool, watering hole', from Proto-Slavic *loky 'water-filled depression, pond'. The German name of the settlement, Hülben (literally, 'ponds'; cf. Hüle) is a translation of the Slovene name, whereas the Italian name Corgnale is a corruption of the German word Kornhalle 'grain warehouse'—that is, the village granary.

== Landmarks ==
The most prominent cultural monument in Lokev is the defense tower at the Tabor Fortress, which was built in 1485 by the Venetians for protection against the Ottomans. Later it served as the village granary, and today it is a museum. The Knights Templar built Saint Michael's Parish Church, which contains frescoes by Tone Kralj. Nearby is the gothic chapel of Mary Help of Christians from 1426. On top of Klemenka Hill above Lokev stands the prehistoric Klemenka Fort. The ruins of a church dedicated to Saint Clement, the patron saint of sheep, are still visible on the hill. The villagers prayed to the saint to protect their sheep from wolves. Kokoš Hill (670 m) stands on the Italian border, separating the Sežana Karst from the Gulf of Trieste. Several marked walking, cycling, and riding paths are also maintained. Vilenica Cave, the oldest show cave in Europe, is near Lokev.

=== Fabiani museum shop ===
A store operated in the Fabiani house from 1869 to 1948. It is now a museum with items that were sold at grocery shops in the past: candy, seeds, shoe polish, baking powder, vinegar, cosmetics, paper, packaging made of tin, glass, and wood, notions, tobacco products, spices, washing powder, soap, coffee, paint, and enamel and zinc dishes.

=== Tabor Military Museum ===
Tabor Military Museum was opened in 1995 by Srečko Rože and his wife in Lokev's 15th-century Venetian Tabor Fortress. The collection has more than 140,000 items, most dating from the first and second world wars. About 4,200 items are on display. The items include military uniforms, among which a red one from the time of Maria Theresa stands out. A special item is a gold-handled sabre that Hitler presented to his officers for exceptional service; only 11 of these have been preserved. Rare items from the Second World War include children's gas masks and soap from the Dachau concentration camp. A unique item at the museum is a thick chronicle of the Habsburg dynasty from the time of Franz Joseph I with a front cover made of 16-karat gold.
