= Lokvica =

Lokvica may refer to:

- Lokvica, Slovenia, a village in the Municipality of Miren-Kostanjevica
- Lokvica, Croatia, a village near Brod Moravice
- Lokvica, North Macedonia, a village in the Makedonski Brod Municipality
- Lokvica, Kosovo, a village near Prizren
