= Pavel Vilikovský =

Slovak writer (1941–2020)

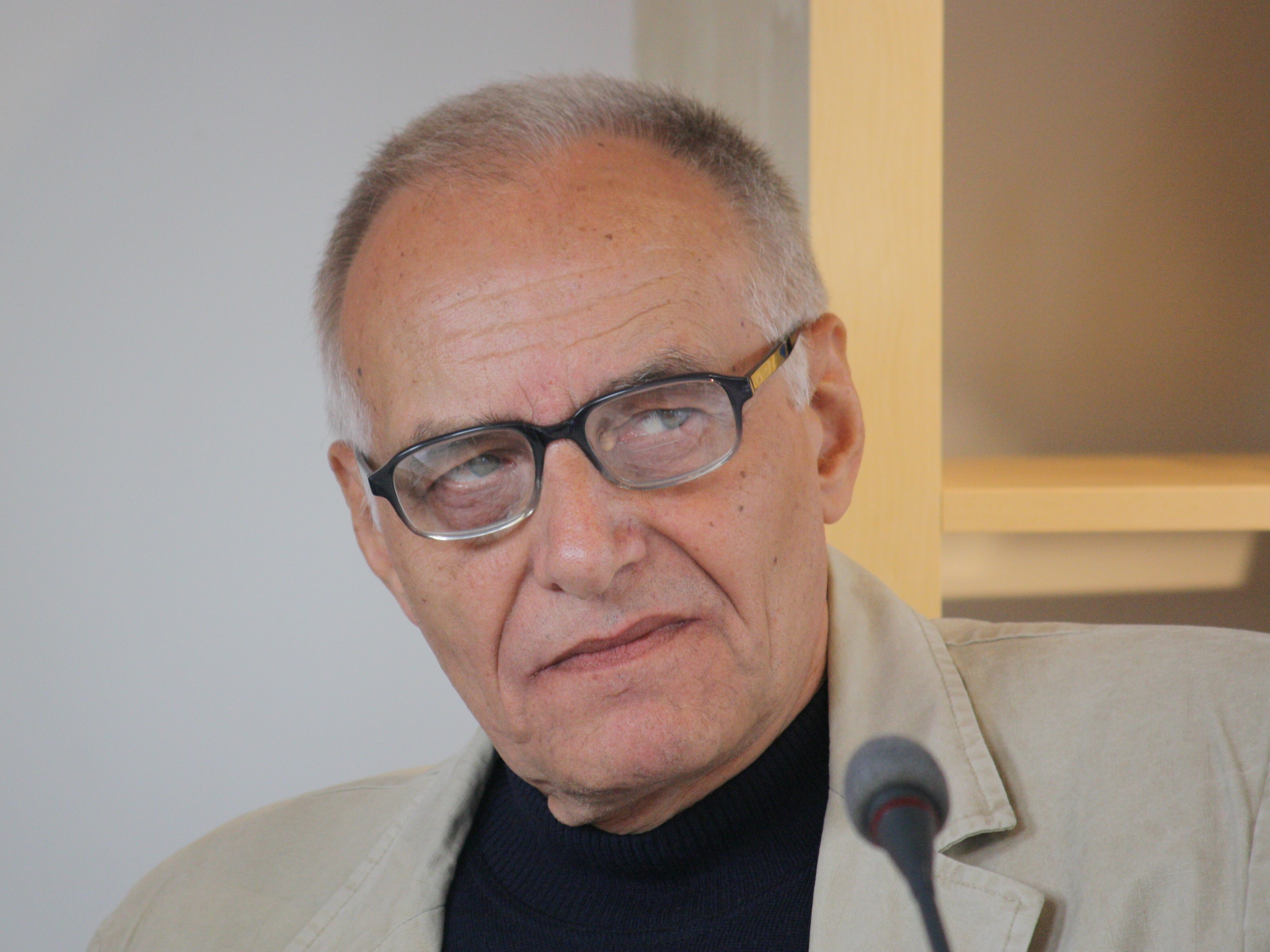
- Vilikovský in 2011
- Born: 27 June 1941; Palúdzka, Slovak Republic
- Died: 10 February 2020 (aged 78)
- Occupation: Writer
- Writing career
- Language: Slovak

Pavel Vilikovský (27 June 1941 – 10 February 2020) was a Slovak writer. He was born in Palúdzka, now part of Liptovský Mikuláš. He attended the FAMU film school in Prague, before switching to Comenius University in Bratislava where he studied languages. He worked as an editor at various journals and publishing houses. Although he started writing in the 1960s, his literary output only became freely available after the Velvet Revolution. He published more than a dozen books, of which Letmý sneh (2014) has been translated into English, as Fleeting Snow. In 1997, Vilikovský won the Vilenica Prize.

He was the younger brother of the translator and diplomat Ján Vilikovský.
