= Viktoras Petkus =

Lithuanian human rights activist

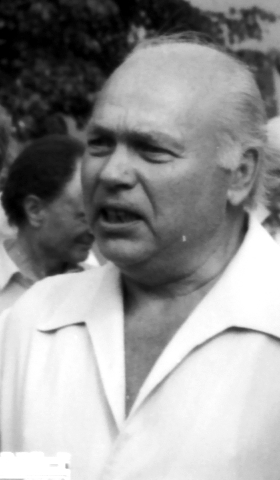
- Petkus in 1997
- Born: 17 May 1928; Aleksandrai, Lithuania
- Died: 1 May 2012 (aged 83); Vilnius, Lithuania
- Burial place: Raseiniai
- Known for: Soviet dissident
- Board member of: Lithuanian Helsinki Group; Christian Democratic Union

Viktoras Petkus (17 May 1928 – 1 May 2012) was a Lithuanian political activist and Soviet dissident. He was a founding member of the Lithuanian Helsinki Group in 1976 which set out to document violations of human rights in the Soviet Union. For various anti-Soviet activities, Petkus was imprisoned three times in various prisons and Gulag camps by the Soviet authorities.

== Biography ==
=== Soviet dissident ===
==== First two imprisonments ====
Petkus was born in Aleksandrai near Raseiniai. As a high school student in Raseiniai, he was an active member of Ateitis, a Lithuanian Catholic youth organization. For such activities he was arrested by the Soviet authorities and sentenced to five years in a Gulag under Article 58 of the Soviet Penal Code for anti-Soviet agitation. He served the sentence in the Vladimir Central Prison and in the Komi ASSR. He attempted to escape in 1949 and the sentence was doubled to ten years. He was sent to Minlag. However, after the death of Joseph Stalin in 1953, he was released under a clemency program that pardoned juvenile offenders. He returned to Lithuania and wanted to join a priest seminary, but was refused due to his imprisonment. He then enrolled into Vilnius University to study languages and literature.

In 1957, Petkus participated in anti-Soviet protest during the All Saints' Day gathering in Rasos Cemetery. He was sentenced by the Supreme Court of the Lithuanian SSR to seven years in labor camps. He served the sentence in Ozerlag (Irkutsk Oblast), Dubravlag (Mordovia ASSR), and Vladimir Central Prison. He returned to Vilnius in December 1965 and took various short-lasting jobs (technician of medical equipment, accountant, sacristan at the Church of Saint Nicholas, etc.).

==== Lithuanian Helsinki Group ====
He remained active in anti-Soviet circles. He was arrested again in December 1975 when he went to meet Andrei Sakharov who arrived to Vilnius for the trial of Sergei Kovalev. This time Petkus was released, and Sakharov listened to the radio broadcast of the ceremony awarding him the Nobel Peace Prize in Petkus' apartment. Petkus was a key participant in organizing the Lithuanian Helsinki Group in November 1976 to monitor human rights in the Lithuanian SSR after the adoption of the Helsinki Accords. He also initiated the establishment of the Joint Supreme Committee of the Estonian, Latvian, and Lithuanian National Movements in August 1977. The committee included Juris Ziemelis, Mart-Olav Niklus, and other activists. The committee published documents related to the Soviet occupation of the Baltic states and attempted to collaborate with Russian and Ukrainian dissidents, but disintegrated after arrests of its leaders.

Petkus was arrested again in August 1978. Soviet officials searched his apartment and found two typewriters, an underground press and, documents from the Lithuanian Helsinki Group. To discredit him in the eyes of the public, Petkus was also charged with two criminal counts on sodomy and involving minors in drunkenness. In July 1978, the Supreme Court of the Lithuanian SSR ruled him to be a "particularly dangerous recidivist" and sentenced him to three years in prison, seven years in special regimen camp, and five years of internal exile for "anti-Soviet agitation and propaganda". He served his sentence in the Vladimir Central and Chistopol Prisons and Perm-36 camp. In August 1988, Petkus was exiled to the village of Bagdarin, Buryat ASSR.

Petkus' persecution attracted international attention. For example, his case was mentioned by U.S. President Jimmy Carter in a news conference when discussing human rights in the Soviet Union. Harsh sentences handed out to Petkus, Alexander Ginzburg, Aleksandr Solzhenitsyn, and other dissidents prompted the U.S. government to enact punitive measures against the Soviet Union, including requiring export licenses for oil and gas equipment and reviewing cultural and scientific exchanges.

=== Independent Lithuania ===
When Soviets introduced glasnost and perestroika policies that allowed freer political expression, Petkus was released. He returned to Lithuania in fall 1988 and joined political activities. In 1989, he became chairman of the Christian Democratic Union (until 2001), one of the co-founders of Ateitis Catholic youth organization and the Lithuanian Human Rights Association (was its honorary chairman). He also co-founded the Union of Lithuanian Political Prisoners in 1990. He published newspaper Nepriklausoma Lietuva (Independent Lithuania) in 1990–1995 and edited journal Lietuvos sargas (Guardian of Lithuania) in 1994–1995. In 1992–1997, he was advisor to the Seimas and the Government of Lithuania on human rights.

He then largely retired from public life and devoted his time to writing. While Petkus did not complete his university education, he was well read and amassed a large personal library (5,000 books were gifted to the library of Mykolas Romeris University in 2010). He wrote several works on the history of the Catholic church in Lithuania: chapels of Vilnius Cathedral (1994), bishop Ignacy Jakub Massalski (2000), bishops of Vilnius (2002), priest Česlovas Kavaliauskas (2002), Dominican Order in Lithuania (2004), Church of Saint Nicholas in Vilnius (2004). He also published two volumes of documents of the Lithuanian Helsinki Group (1999 and 2007) and a collection of letters, memoirs, and poems of political prisoners of the Soviet Union (2007).

After a long illness, Petkus died on 1 May 2012 in Vilnius. He was buried in Raseiniai where a progymnasium was renamed in his memory in September 2012.

== Awards ==
Petkus received the following awards:

- 1994: Knight's Cross of the Order of the Lithuanian Grand Duke Gediminas
- 1999: Commander Cross of the Order of the Cross of Vytis
- 2000: Lithuanian Independence Medal
- 2007: Ukrainian Order for Courage (1st Class)
- 2011: Estonian Order of the Cross of Terra Mariana (3rd Class)
