= Andrius Petkus =

Lithuanian sculptor

Andrius Petkus (born 1976) is a Lithuanian sculptor from Palanga, a pioneer and promoter of sand sculpture in Lithuania. He established the sand sculpture park / museum in Palanga. He also works in other medias, create conceptual sculptures. He is a winner of some ice sculpture contests.

In 1991 – 1996 Petkus studied Institute of Applied and Decorative Arts, Telšiai. Department of Artistic wood treatment. He obtained BA (1996 – 2000) and MA (2000 – 2002) degrees in sculpture from Vilnius Academy of Arts. He has had personal exhibitions in Lithuania and won many competitions in Lithuania, Latvia, Russia, Italy, Finland, China, Australia, Canada and the USA. Petkus is an organizer of international sculpture symposiums and art festivals in Lithuania (stone & wood carving, steel welding, pumpkin carving, fire sculptures, concrete and other materials).

2023 First place in Doubles with his Father Vaclovas Petkus in international sand sculpture festival at Siesta Key, USA.

2023 First place in International sand sculpture festival at Rhode Island, USA.

2021 European champion. First place. International sand sculpture Europe championship in Belgium.

2018 World champion. First place in Doubles with Dmitri Klimenko at the Virginia Beach Neptune Championship Sand Sculpting. Sculptors choice medals as well.

2017 Second place in Doubles with Dmitri Klimenko at the Virginia Beach Neptune Championship Sand Sculpting.

2016 Third place in Doubles with Jihoon Choi at the Virginia Beach Neptune Championship Sand Sculpting.

2016 second place at the International Sand Sculpture Competition in Toronto, Canada.

2014 World champion. First place. International Sand Sculpture Championship in Moscow, Russia.

2014 Second place at the International Sand Sculpture Festival, Saint Petersburg, Russia.

2012 Fourth place at the International Sand Sculpture Championship "Neptune festival", Virginia Beach, USA.

2011 Third place at the International Sand Sculpture Festival, Perm, Russia.

2011 Fifth place at the International Sand Sculpture Championship "Neptune festival", Virginia Beach, USA.

2009 First place at the International Sand Sculpture Festival, Jelgava, Latvia.

2008 Second place at the International Sand Sculpture Festival, Jelgava, Latvia.

2007 Third place at the International Sand Sculpture Festival, Jelgava, Latvia.

In summer 2015 he attracted attention with his sand sculpture Last Supper, showing 13 Lithuanian celebrities:Egmontas Bžeskas, Mantas Petruškevičius, Marijonas Mikutavičius, Arūnas Valinskas, Žilvinas Žvagulis, Stasys Povilaitis, Juozas Statkevičius, Vaidas Baumila, Žilvinas Grigaitis, Andrius Mamontovas, Algis Ramanauskas, Ramūnas Rudokas, with Arvydas Sabonis sitting in the place of Jesus Christ.
