= Ferdinand Runk =

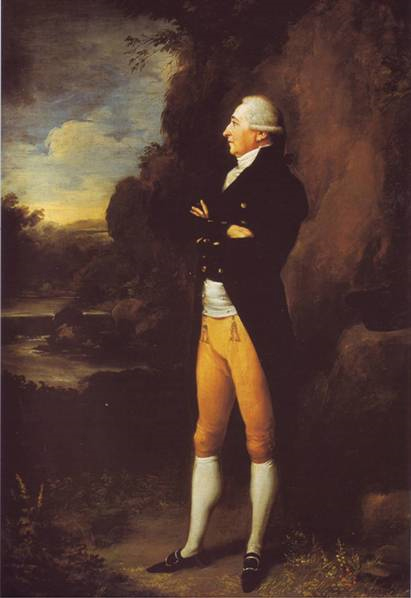
Ferdinand Runk by Joseph Bergler, 1802

Ferdinand Runk (October 14, 1764 – December 3, 1834), also known as Franz Ferdinand Runk, was a German-Austrian landscape painter, draftsman and etcher.

== Early life ==
In 1778 Runk graduated from the Academy of Fine Arts Vienna, and studied with among others Hubert Maurer, Friedrich August and Johann Christian Brand. Soon after completion of the Academy, he was very successful, in addition to oil paintings mainly with gouache, his preferred technique. From 1795 he was employed by John of Austria, later employed by Karl Philipp, Prince of Schwarzenberg and Johann I Joseph, Prince of Liechtenstein. For them, he traveled through the Tyrol, the Netherlands, Germany and France, where he painted many landscape views. Many of his drawings and watercolors were reproduced in print series.

== Patronage ==
He lived and worked mainly in Bohemia, mainly in Český Krumlov, but also in Styria, in the service of Joseph II of Schwarzenberg (1769–1833). Between 1803 and 1810, an intense friendship and collaboration with his pupil and patron Pauline Schwarzenberg, the wife of Joseph II. On the death of Pauline in 1810 was followed by a nearly year-long hiatus.

== Later years ==
In 1811 Runk married Rosalie Zadlitzová, with whom he had two daughters. He later lived primarily in Austria. Despite its popularity, his works were rarely found on exhibitions, but were shown at the exhibitions of the Academy of Fine Arts in 1822 and 1824. In his last years he turned his attention increasingly to the restoration of old paintings from the collection of Schwarzenberg. When Runk died in 1834 he was buried at Schloss Neuwaldegg. Many of his works can be found in the Graphic Collection of the Academy of Fine Arts and in the Albertina museum in Vienna today.

== Other ==
The asteroid 4662 Runk was named by Czech astronomer Jana Tichá after Ferdinand Runk, as Runk had in 1830 painted a panoramic watercolor of the view from Kleť (1038 meters), the location of the Kleť Observatory.
