= Nijolė Sadūnaitė =

Lithuanian Catholic nun and human rights activist (1938–2024)

Nijolė Sadūnaitė (22 July 1938 – 31 March 2024) was a Lithuanian clandestine Catholic nun of the Soviet period who worked with the Chronicle of the Catholic Church in Lithuania. In 1975 she faced three years of imprisonment for her efforts. She spent time imprisoned in Mordovia and then in Boguchany. She reportedly faced a variety of abuses in this period, including torture. She wrote A Radiance in the Gulag about her experiences.

In 2018, Sadūnaitė received the "Lithuanian Freedom Award". She was the first female in history to receive the award.

Sadūnaitė died on Easter Sunday, 31 March 2024, at the age of 85.
