= USSR anti-religious campaign (1970s–1987) =

A new and more aggressive phase of anti-religious persecution in the Soviet Union began in the mid-1970s after a more tolerant period following Nikita Khrushchev's downfall in 1964.

Yuri Andropov headed the campaign in the 1970s when it began. This new persecution followed the 1975 amendments to the 1929 anti-religious legislation and the 25th Party Congress. A Central Committee resolution in 1979 played a key role in the period as well. The intensification of anti-religious activity had continued since the early 1970s; between 1971 and 1975 over 30 doctoral and 400 magisterial dissertations were defended on the subjects of atheism and criticism of religion. In 1974 there was a conference in Leningrad dedicated to "The Topical Problems of the History of Religion and Atheism in the Light of Marxist–Leninist Scholarship".

This persecution, like other anti-religious campaigns in the USSR's history, was used as a tool to eliminate religion in order to create the ideal atheist society that Marxism–Leninism had as a goal.

== Criticism of Khrushchev's campaign ==
After Khrushchev left office, the anti-religious campaign that occurred under him was criticized. The same anti-religious periodicals that had participated in the campaign criticized the articles of past contributors.

Anti-religious propaganda in those years was criticized for failing to understand the causes of religious belief and that religion did not simply survive as a legacy of the past, but continued to attract new people. It was criticized for reducing religion to simply a mass of swindling of credulous fools and failing to acknowledge the notion of faith. It was criticized for misrepresenting religious societies as being composed of evil and immoral people who were working against the Soviet Union. It was also criticized for misrepresenting believers as mentally handicapped enemies who were worthy of all contempt.

The propaganda was criticized for being counter-productive, immoral (by telling lies about believers and encouraging hatred of them thereby) and for being false. The propaganda had not adequately explained why people really practiced religion nor had it given an accurate portrayal of what occurred. Many criticized it for having done more harm than good, because rather than eliminating religious belief, it instead simply pushed it underground where the state would have more difficulty trying to control it. The persecution had also attracted popular sympathy for believers, both in the USSR and abroad, as well as to increase interest in religious faith among non-believers.

There were calls that atheism should not be forced down upon people, but rather should be accepted voluntarily.

The propaganda after Khrushchev employed a more moderate tone.

== Anti-religious propaganda ==
The official line that believers' feelings should not be insulted continued to be widely violated in practice. Anti-religious propaganda after Khrushchev was still very much influenced by the policy set down by the 21st CPSU Congress in 1959.

The Soviet press began to sound an alarm in 1972 on account of Communist party and Komsomol members who were not only participating in religious rites, but even initiating them.

The volume of anti-religious literature grew in the 1970s, partly due to a hardening general line towards religion formed as a result of more people turning to it. The press and special conferences complained about the insufficiency of atheistic propaganda. The anti-religious education in the school system was accused of laxity.

Faculties and departments were created for training atheist lecturers in the regions of Moscow, Leningrad, Lipetsk, Gorky and in the Tatar ASSR; permanent seminars existed for the same purpose in Ukraine, Moldavia and Lithuania. All of the state work, however, was found insufficient to counter the influence of religion, especially among youth, who were believed to be finding the atheistic material unconvincing and of low quality. In some areas, such as Uzbekistan, the quality of the propaganda allegedly declined. The establishment was troubled by the growing indifference and apathy among the youth for atheism as well as anti-religious propaganda.

The Eastern Orthodox Church was seen as an increasing threat, especially with regard to its historic claims of developing the Russian nation. At the same time, anti-religious propaganda came to increasingly distinguish between the supposed loyal majority of believers and the enemies of the state who occupied the fringes of religion.

The atheistic journal Problems of Scientific Atheism (Voprosy nauchnogo ateizma) in the late 1970s began to question the explanation that the perseverance of religious beliefs in the USSR was simply a survival of the pre-revolutionary past. This was because the vast majority of believers were born and raised after the October revolution, as well as the fact that religion had shown surprising vitality, despite the decades of efforts to stamp it out. The number of believers who were considered well-educated Soviet citizens was also a challenge for old theories of religious belief being a result of intellectual ignorance. The journal criticized the old Marxist notion that religion would die away with the disappearance of class society.

In the post-Khrushchev years, the leading anti-religious periodical Science and Religion adopted a new approach through a dialogue with believers, by printing portions of letters to the periodical and responding to them. Typically the periodical preferred to print letters that contained assertions that were easier to argue against. For example, a believer might write a letter that argued God must exist because many people believe in Him and they cannot all be wrong, and the periodical would then respond by noting that there were many cases in history where many people believed something that was discovered to be false, such as a flat Earth or even the pagan religions that came before Christianity.

Among justifications used for not printing everything believers' wrote included the argument that believers would not print atheist material in their publications, that by doing so it would help disseminate religious propaganda and also because believers wrote things that bordered on criticism of the state. The publications that believers were permitted to print were limited to be far smaller in circulation than the atheistic propaganda, and the material that was permitted to be printed by believers was also often dictated by the state.

The atheistic side possessed almost a monopoly on the media and it had relative impunity to tell lies, which believers were not permitted to expose.

There continued to be criticisms of the anti-religious propagandists employed by the USSR for being uneducated about religion and failing to produce effective arguments that convinced believers. However, the volume and quality of critical studies of theology, church history and believers greatly increased after Khrushchev, although it retained much bias. Clichés, insults and name-calling that had been repeated for decades continued to be the main methods of propaganda. A critical problem with the more serious studies was that by doing serious critiques of religion, this could be interpreted as admitting religion's respectability, which was not a view that the Ideological Commission of the CPSU Central Committee was willing to tolerate.

There was a Marxist hypothesis that prehistoric humans possessed no religion that was advocated as truth. The atheist propagandists argued that people turned to religion as a result of some tragedy in life, loneliness or lack of compassion from others.

Anti-religious propaganda often depicted kind, compassionate and good atheists, while contrasting them with believers who were depicted as fanatical, intolerant and heartless (e.g. for breaking up marriages when one partner was a non-believer). They were blamed for counterfeiting miracles and promoting anti-Sovietism. Christianity was partly blamed for this by alleging that its teaching of humility deprived people of courage and freedom. In one instance, a female Christian writing to the propagandist Osipov claimed that there was more intolerance and drinking than in previous years, and she blamed the state for provoking this.

A growing interest among the Russian population in its national culture and history, including iconography and religious art, growing nationalism coupled with renewed interest in Orthodoxy as "Russia's church", as well as a number of conversions to Christianity that began with interests in these topics, prompted the Soviet media to argue that culture and religion were not linked, and that religion had bastardized Russian art and culture. The media further argued that the religious art of previous ages (including the work of Andrei Rublev or Theopanes the Greek) was simply expressing humanistic and secular concepts through the only way that such things were permitted to be depicted. Science and Religion printed pictures of religious artwork which they interpreted according to secular values.

The atheist press also criticized museum guides in religious buildings that had been converted to museums, for giving uncritical theological dimensions to what they presented, such as explaining the theology of icons and their function in the Orthodox church, explaining the theological symbolism of the liturgy, the purpose of monastic life and for uncritically explaining the lives of the saints. The press called on them to explain the class character of religion and give secular explanations of religious art and that they should emphasize the negative aspects of church history and not the positive. In a similar vein, the atheist press often published stories about episodes in Russian history that portrayed believers and the Church in a negative light in order to emphasize the point that Christian morals are deficient and that the Church is immoral.

Scientific means were used to support atheism by placing holy water under a microscope and determining it to be identical to normal water, the corpses of saints were exhumed to show that they did in fact experience deterioration, while exhibits at atheist museums showed Noah's ark to be impossible even in concept due to the fact that the number of different animal species on the Earth could not fit within the dimensions in Genesis.

The press avoided attacking the Church establishment, but directed the brunt of its attacks against actively-evangelizing believers and banned religions.

The anti-religious propaganda tried to depict a connection between religious dissent and foreign intelligence services as well as with anti-communist Russian émigré organizations such as NTS. Caches of religious literature confiscated by Soviet customs officials reportedly were subversive and were alleged to be widely accepted among believers. Marxist ideology held that religion was intrinsically hostile to communism, and therefore believers could not be trusted to be sensitive to the ideological threat posed from the West. They even may have felt affinities for the West, and cooperation between the Vatican or other western Christian establishments with the CIA, or the radio messages by Orthodox priests broadcast through Voice of America, also influenced the interpretation to see believers as untrustworthy. Believers were in this manner depicted as the 'weak link' in the Soviet defense line.

The anti-religious propaganda cited cases of conflicts in schools involving religion, which were always blamed on the believers for continuing to hold on to religion (e.g. a schoolchild who committed suicide due to the labeling and contempt against him as a believer in the education system, and the press blamed this on his parents and priest for fostering religion in him, thus incurring the contempt). It also claimed that believers made poorer students and were less successful in academic pursuits than atheists.

Professors at theological schools, and all clergy as well as laity working for the Department of External Ecclesiastical Relations of the Church were taxed similarly to all Soviet employees in recognition of their contribution to a positive Soviet image abroad.

P. Kurochkin, one of the leading Soviet religiologists, argued that eliminating religion should be accompanied by a replacement with communist morality, otherwise the deprival of religion will simply be replaced with moral decline, consumerism and lechery.

== Revived interest in religion ==
Furov, the CRA vice-chairman wrote a report ca. 1975 (smuggled to the west 1979) wherein he claimed the existence of 'irrefutable evidence' of a decline in religion in the USSR. His evidence was a decrease in Orthodox clergy from 8252 in 1961 to 5994 in 1974 (he did not cite the pre-Khrushchev figure of 30,000 in 1958). In his conclusion that this was a natural decline he did not take account for the masses of priests who were de-registered, imprisoned, executed, etc. The CRA had also during this period prevented more clergy from being registered or enrolling at seminaries. Furov's report provided a great deal of information about the church. He cited cases of people prevented from attending theological institutes including people who would have been greatly embarrassing to the state had they become clergy (e.g. children of highly placed Soviet leaders). With the slow erosion of the Church's institutional strength, the extinction of the Church as an institution seemed possible.

Only 4% of parents attended church in 1970 and many of them did not bring their children with them.

There were rumours in the late 1970s that a comprehensive scientific study was done by Pisarov that blatantly contradicted the official figures of people abandoning religion, but was never published for that reason.

Many Soviet youth turned to religion, and concern was expressed over this attraction, which was believed by Soviet authorities to be caused by the art, architecture and music of the Church, as well as that the church's separation from political and material power by the state had removed previously negative associations with religion. This view held that the youth saw the church as preserving a cultural-historical role that had been now purified from its ugly past.

For a long period the Soviet press refused to report on this growth of religion among the youth and claims of it occurring were brushed aside as false. Readers' letters to atheist journals that stressed the reader's concern over this growth contradicted these claims. In the 1970s a special irregular publication called 'The World of Man' issued by the Komsomol monthly 'The Young Guard' (Molodaia guardiia) was created as an answer to this threat. In this journal, religion was compared with Nazism by stressing the religious components of Nazism, and it re-interpreted Russian history through distortions such as claiming that Pushkin was an atheist and claiming such things as that Gogol's mind was harmed by religious influence. It answered letters from young Komsomol who stated things like that they didn't think there was any harm in their Komsomol friends getting married in a church, and in response the publication decried the influence of religion penetrating the lives of Soviet youth. This propaganda alleged that the growing interest among youth was a plan of Western ideological subversion, Western broadcasts and Western religious organizations that smuggled religious literature into the USSR.

At the June 1983 CPSU Central Committee Plenum, General Secretary KU Chernenko declared that the West was trying to cultivate religiosity in the USSR as a method of subversion.

A notable example of some of the press campaign directed in response to this phenomenon was the story of Sasha Karpov published in 'Science and Religion'. The story was designed to show that young educated Soviets who became religious were hypocrites looking for fame and distinction in originality in society, without possessing any qualities that would give them the same prestige in normal Soviet life. Sasha's mother was described as a biology teacher at a rural school, who was cold and had no warmth or interest in her children. Sasha's divorced father was an alcoholic who also did not care for his children. After Sasha's mother retired from teaching she retired to a village with a functioning Orthodox church and became a pious laywoman, telling her children that she had always been a believer, but just never mentioned it ('Science and Religion' failed to mention that she would have lost her teaching job if she had mentioned it). Sasha, left on his own, then decides he wants to prove himself and he attempts singing, writing poetry, and studying to become a teacher. His artistic skill proves to be poor and the latter career frightens him with its hard work and modest life, and so he instead becomes a singing hippy. He comes across a priest eventually who hires him as a church reader and singer. Six months later he then leaves the priest, but not before he gets the priest's list of acquaintances in Moscow. One of such acquaintances he travels to, and finds a couple of young physicists (husband and wife) with an apartment full of icons and Russian artifacts. They like Sasha and consider him a seeker of Truth, and he adopts their religious habits (e.g. Crossing themselves facing the icons, praying before meals, etc.) Eventually he decides to join a monastery where he is told his voice and musical talent will let him do choral singing as his monastic duty. The article stressed that Sasha wore his cassock whenever he went to visit friends and relatives in Moscow in order to shock and impress them, and that everything in life is turned into a fraud through such choices.

Young people, especially if they were educated, were actively persecuted for practicing religion, and especially if they did so openly, or participated in Christian study groups or choirs. People who were part of such groups could be arrested and even placed in "psychiatric prisons". Placing the religious youth in psychiatric hospitals was based on the principle that any person who had gone through the atheistic education from kindergarten to university and yet remained religious (or even worse, if he converted), could be considered to have a kind of psychological disorder.

The 19th Komsomol congress in 1982 ordered all local committees 'to perfect that atheistic upbringing of the young generation, to profoundly expose the anti-scientific essence of religious ideology and morals'. It also called for a 'fuller use of the cinema, the theatre, institutions of culture and libraries for the scientific-atheistic propaganda' and to 'improve individual atheistic work with children and teenagers, especially with those stemming from religious families; recruit young teachers, pioneer and Komsomol workers for this work... Educate militant atheists, form active atheistic public opinion, do no leave without an exacting reprimand every case of the Komsomol members' participation in religious rites'.

Official journals in 1982 raised more alarm about growing apathy towards Marxism and ideology among Soviet youth. This was blamed on 'bourgeois philosophers' who charged the Marxist–Leninist ideology with responsibility for bad science, and who blamed the state for violating freedom of research and academic autonomy. The journal 'Voprosy filisofi' on the sixtieth anniversary of Lenin's 1922 article 'On the Importance of Militant Materialism' even claimed that the state's antireligious struggle was still quite weak and needed improvement.

The state's allowance of expansions to existing seminaries bore fruit, and by the early 1980s, the student population at these institutions had grown to 2300 day and extramural students (it had been 800 in 1964).

Soviet Statistics from the late 1960s claimed that more people were leaving the Orthodox Church to join other sects than vice versa. There were Orthodox Christians who also formed independent communities that were separated from the official hierarchy.

== Illegal religions ==
Several religions had been completely outlawed and practicing members of them could be arrested if caught. These included Eastern Catholics, Jehovah's Witnesses, Russian Jehovists, Buddhists (Buriats and Kalmyks were permitted to practice Buddhism but no one else), Pentecostals and the unofficial or 'Initiative' Baptists (Baptists who had broken from the Baptist community in 1962 because they did not accept state control of their church). Any religion that was not registered with the Soviet government was automatically considered illegal and the state could pursue a policy of open persecution of these groups (for other religions it was a hidden policy using other guises). Lack of registration resulted both from the Soviet government refusing to register certain groups and also as a result of certain groups refusing to be registered as well as to then accept some degree of Communist influence through registration.

The Soviet government had an official policy that the Jehovah's Witnesses would not be persecuted if they registered with the state. At the same time Soviet propaganda constantly maligned the group as a subversive organization. A large amount of space in the anti-religious press was devoted to attacking Jehovah's Witnesses and Jehovists during the course of 1983–1985, which suggests growth in the movement in these years. At least fifteen of their activists were arrested in 1984, of which seven received prison sentences.

The Russian Jehovists were a sect similar to the Jehovah's Witnesses, founded by Russian artillery captain, NS Il'insky in the 19th century. It was characterized by its radical condemnation of all state power as the kingdom of Satan, which was a message that attracted many people in the USSR, leading to the growth in the movement.

In the early history of the state, Buddhist communities had tried to reform their religion in the face of Communism. Prominent Buddhists proclaimed that the Buddha lived in Lenin, and that the Buddha in Lenin had founded Communism. After Khrushchev, Buddhists were subjected to a wave of attacks after some Eastern bloc intellectuals converted to Buddhism. In 1972 a leading Buddhist and Tibetan scholar in the USSR, Bidia Dandaron, was arrested and sentenced to five years' hard labour. He was a secret Buddhist monk, lama and teacher and was hated by the regime for converting a number of intellectuals to Buddhism. He was charged in the press for supposedly organizing drunken orgies under the guise of religious meetings, taking bribes, cultivating adoration of himself and corrupting youth. Several of his associates and students were arrested with him. Dandaron had already spent almost twenty years in prison under Stalin, and most of the charges were thrown out in court, however, he was still given his sentence of five years. The judge at his trial claimed "If it were in my power I would send all religious believers to Kolyma". Four of his students, who were active research scholars and teachers, were sent to psychiatric institutions and eight other students of his lost their employment.

Hindu groups in Krasnoyarsk in Siberia were disbanded in 1981–1982, and their leader, E. Tretiakov, was sent to prison for 'parasitism'.

One of the leaders of the unofficial Baptists had a campaign of character assassination used against him in the press after a supposedly adulterous love affair he had in Siberia, which also played upon the conclusion that the underground Baptists as a whole were immoral lechers (the press never mentioned the reason why he was in Siberia, however; he was in an administrative exile).

Persecution was stepped up in the 1970s against the Initiative Baptists. The official Baptist church was treated comparatively well, with allowance of genuine debates in its congresses, and voting against decisions or candidates promoted by the state (even succeeding once in electing their own candidate instead). The official baptists were allowed to open many new churches (exceeding per capita numbers for the Orthodox). This preferential treatment was designed to strike at the baptists who had broken off in order to give them the message that there was no point in remaining in opposition.

The Initiative Baptists had a position that they would accept state registration but only if it did not involve control of their religion. The Soviet government refused to accept these terms, and the group was persecuted. Initiative Baptists who tried to give religious instruction to children or organize youth groups were arrested. Eugene Pushkov, an initiative Baptist, was arrested for these and other reasons in 1980, and after his release in 1983, he was asked to cooperate with the KGB as an informer, but he refused, which led to his re-arrest shortly thereafter and a sentence of four years, which he appealed, and after hearing his appeal, he was given an eight-year sentence.

Many Baptists were arrested under charges of breaking the laws against performance of religious activities outside of officially recognized church structures. 202 baptists were arrested for this reason in mid-1967, of which 190 were sentenced to imprisonment. The number of initiative Baptists in the camps went from 79 in 1979, to 120 in 1981, to 165 in 1982 and to over 200 in 1984. Many of the buildings they used for prayers were destroyed. In one instance, in Chervotsy in the western Ukraine, a huge tent was raised by Initiative Baptists, which was visited by the militia (local police). The militia forbade people to come to the tent, stating that there were land mines placed in the tent, and it was soon after destroyed.

Sadism was present in some of these closures for the Initiative Baptists as it was also present for closures for other religions. For example, in the city of Issyk in Alma-Ata province, the local government suggested to the local initiative Baptist group in 1974 that they should build a permanent house of worship, the community happily did this. In 1976, the authorities then ordered the believers to wreck the building they had constructed, which they refused to do. The state then took the opportunity to arrest the minister for breaking the law and then confiscated the building.

The Baptists ran an illegal printing press called the Khristianin Publishers. One of their presses was found by the KGB near Riga in October 1974 and those who ran it were sentenced to long terms of hard labour. Their underground publishing continued, however, and they boasted of having published nearly half a million copies of the Gospels in ten years.

Fifty of their members were imprisoned in 1981, and seventy-three in 1982. A total of 165 of their members were in prison and camps by the end of 1982.

The Baptists ran illegal children and youth camps for many years. The state made great efforts at trying to eliminate religious instruction to minors.

George Vins, the former Council Secretary of the Initiative Baptists, was imprisoned and expelled to the United States in 1979. After he left, it was alleged that he was sending instructions from the US back to the USSR to protest Soviet legislation. P. Rumachik, another Initiative Baptist leader, was released from prison in 1977, and was alleged to have been caught by the KGB in 1980 for running clandestine printing shops. The Initiative Baptists ran underground printing presses, which greatly irritated the state. Rumachik was linked with Vins, and sentenced to five years' hard labour. This affair was further linked to an Initiative Baptist pastor named Dimitry Miniakov who was arrested in 1978 for supposed collaboration with the Germans in World War II.

Pentecostals had merged with the Baptists in 1945, but when the split in the Baptists occurred in 1961–62, many Pentecostals left the official church and did not join the initiative Baptists. They became more prominent in the 1960s and 1970s, and in some areas they successfully achieved registration with the CRA, but about half of their community refused to register because of their refusal to accept Soviet bans on spreading religion to youth or children, bans on prayer meetings, as well as bans on preaching, missionary and charity work as well the practice of their key religious rites. The renegades suffered fines and arrests for breaking these rules, and they were also persecuted for refusing to take part in the Soviet military except in engineering or medical corps. They were subject to many raids and their religious literature was confiscated. In 1971 there was an incident in Chernogorsk where they were dispersed with a firehose. A number of people of German background belonged to this sect, and some of them attempted to emigrate, but were persecuted for attempting to do so. A group of such Pentecostal were tried in April 1985 for going on a hunger strike until they were allowed entry to West Germany, and their leader was sentenced to five years in a labour camp.

An extremist religious group which had broken off from the Ukrainian Rite Catholics called Pukutnyky had appeared in the mid-1950s and was illegal. It was attacked in the press for supposedly counterfeiting signs from God that declared the end of the world, as well as for terrorizing people who left their sect by burning their houses.

Eastern Rite Catholics (Uniates) had been outlawed in the USSR since 1946. After they were made illegal at that time, seven of their bishops, and two thousand of their priests, who refused to discontinue their tradition were sent to concentration camps or imprisoned. These churches continued to exist underground up to the fall of the Soviet Union. The state was officially opposed to these groups because of their strong association with nationalist identities. The state mercilessly persecuted them, and constantly raided their places of worship. Many eastern-rite catholic clergy were released in the 1950s following Stalin's death. Problems with regard to strong resistance to the state on account national identification with religion were found among Muslims in Central Asia.

In 1924 at the Fifth Congress of the Seventh-day Adventists in Russia, the leaders of the Adventist community declared Lenin's socialism a blessing and that Lenin was a leader chosen by God; they also proclaimed their full support and dedication to Marxism. After this congress, there was a significant split in the Adventist community when a portion of the community formed what was called the 'True and Free' Adventists. This breakdown was further amplified in 1928 at their congress when the leaders of the official Adventists declared it the duty of Adventists to serve in the Red Army and to bear arms. The breakaway group became subject to continual and vicious persecutions down to the fall of communism. Its leader, VA Shelkov served three sentences in prisons totally 23 years prior to his fourth and final sentence in 1979 during, which he died. Shelkov was an excellent organizer of his underground community, and the sect continued to survive as well as to print bibles or other religious tracts, despite constant raids and imprisonments. A wave of arrests of this group occurred in 1978–1979, when the authorities unsuccessfully conducted a national search to find their printing press. The community did not have any religious buildings, but gathered in private quarters for prayers on Saturdays, which allowed this sect to keep itself hidden more easily.

== Muslims ==
Soviet scholars estimated that 10 to 25% of the traditional Muslim minority in the USSR were still active believers, but this was contradicted by Western observers and Soviet Islamic leaders who claimed that almost all of the traditional Muslim minority were active believers. In 1965 an investigation into mosque attendance in the Kazakh SSR revealed that 10% of worshippers were Komsomol members. A further study in 1985 found that 14 percent of the Uzbek Communist Party and 56 percent of the Tajik Communist Party were believing Muslims.

A considerable amount of reconciliation existed between Muslims in the Soviet state. There was support for the Soviet system in the Muslim community for adopting laws dictated by Allah through Muhammad, even though the government were atheists.

Circumcisions, like Christian baptisms, were often done in secret.

Sufi groups had been outlawed, and the state organized 4 bodies to oversee Islamic activities in the USSR. Three of these were for Sunni Muslims (based in Makhachkala, Tashkent and Ufa) and the fourth was for Shi'ite Muslims (based in Baku). These bodies reported directly to the CRA. A madrassa in Bukhara as well as an Islamic Institute in Tashkent were permitted to exist and trained Islamic clergy. In great contrast to other faiths in the USSR, the Muslim clergy could leave the country in order to receive training.

An example of Soviet perspective on Islam is what is written in a Soviet grammar book that had the following answers to a series of questions on Islamic practices:

Q: What does the Mullah do?

A: The Mullah reads the Qur'an and when someone dies he reads prayers.

Q: What does he read about in the Qur'an?

A: We do not know.

Q: Does he himself understand what he reads?

A: No.

Q: Does he read the prayers for nothing?

A: No, he gets money for this.

In 1984 there were 1100 mosques functioning in the country, which fell far below the requirements of the population.

Like other religions, large amounts of illegal underground activities took place among Muslims who operated underground presses, organized unofficial Islamic communities and pilgrimages to local holy places. The Hajj to Mecca was nearly impossible for most Soviet Muslims, and only a handful (around 60) were officially permitted to go each year and they were tasked beforehand with presenting a positive Soviet image abroad.

Problems with regard to strong resistance to the state on account national identification with religion were found among Muslims in Central Asia. The clear ethnic linkage between Islam and certain ethnic groupings made it difficult for the state to wipe out the religion due to their attacks provoking nationalist feelings among the ethnic groups.

The state tried to showcase its (supposedly) positive treatment of Muslims in propaganda campaigns in the Third World in order to gain support for Soviet interests. The events of the revolution in Iran in the late 1970s, as well as the growing Islamic opposition to the USSR in the war in Afghanistan, led to the USSR launching a new crackdown on Islam in its last decade, with arrests of Muslims who attempted to disseminate religious literature.

Following the collapse of communism, in many Muslim areas the collapse was celebrated and Muslim leaders tried to educate the population about Islam.

== Orthodox sects ==
Old Believer sects (Russian Orthodox believers who had split from the Orthodox church in the 17th century) were still treated as anti-social and criminal institutions. Many distortions of them were in the official press after Khrushchev. A sect called Skrytniki (concealers) led by Khristofor Zyrianov was accused of engaging in mass suicides through self-immolation in the woods of Northern Russia in the pre-war period. Zyrianov had been suspected of this at the time and was oddly given a brief sentence of administrative exile in 1932 (which may make the allegations untrue, since if he really had done this, he would likely have been shot).

A novel was published in 'Science and Religion' supposedly based on a true story that concerned an Old Believer sect called the 'True Orthodox Wanderers'. In the story, a young Moscow Komsomol girl comes under the influence of a regular Moscow Orthodox priest who sends her to an underground Siberian skete with a pious woman. There, the girls is taught to do future missionary work and to take secret monastic vows. She is treated to severe fasting, hatred of the world, despotic exploitation, banning of all literature but the Bible and some theological tracts, living in a cellar without seeing the sun, absence of smiles or friendliness, and rudeness. This atmosphere was presented as an accurate depiction of life in the Old Believer sects. Eventually the girl is rescued by her Sherlock Holmes-like, heroic Komsomol friends.

Often the official propaganda failed to make a distinction between these sects and the regular Orthodox church. This may have been deliberate in order to tie up the Orthodox with the supposed crimes of the sects.

The Old believers attempted to have many churches reopened, but they were unsuccessful. There was a Samizdat report in 1969 that an Old Believer priest was murdered by the KGB for refusing to work for them.

== Roman Catholics ==
Before the war, Roman Catholic areas in Ukraine and in Belarus stubbornly defended their faith in the 1930s and the anti-religious institutions complained of the great influence that Catholic priests had over the local people.

Most Roman Catholics in the USSR lived in areas that had been annexed during World War II, which meant that most of them escaped the pre-war persecutions. This meant that the Catholic Church had proportionally more functioning churches and seminaries that could be attacked in the post-war persecutions than the Orthodox church. In Lithuania two of the three seminaries were closed, and the clergy was reduced from 1500 to 735 serving 628 churches.

Organized persecutions developed against the Roman Catholic Church in Lithuania. Priests were harassed and imprisoned for catechesis to children, since this was considered organized religious instruction to minors (banned in 1918). Lithuanian bishops, Steponavichus and Sladkiavichus were exiled. Teachers could be fired for their religious views, and many Catholic churches were demolished. The church of St Casimir was turned into a museum of atheism, the Vilnius cathedral became an art gallery, the Church of the Resurrection in Kaunas became a radio factory, and the Jesuit Cathedral in Kaunas became a sports hall. The Klaipėda cathedral, which had been built after many years of petitioning in 1961, was closed and confiscated.

The authorities in Lithuania, as in other parts of the country, also resisted attempts to reverse Khrushchev's acts against religion. A church in the village of Žalioji, which was closed in 1963, was turned into a flour mill in 1978. The local miller, however, refused to work in it, and the mill was forced to be run only four hours a week. Petitioners failed to gain its reopening when they petitioned the government.

The state encountered a major problem in its campaign in Lithuania, however, because like in Poland, there was a strong national identification of the Lithuanians with the Roman Catholic Church and the persecutions provoked nationalist resistance as well as publicity. Thousands of Lithuanians protested the antireligious campaign in their country. A petition of 148,149 signatures was printed as a book that was sent to Brezhnev. In 1977, a petition was signed by 554 of the over 700 Roman Catholic priests in Lithuania, and the state reacted very cautiously by arresting and sentencing only a few priests among the signatories.

Roman Catholicism in the Western Ukraine also put up a strong resistance to Soviet attempts to curtail it.

A lack of such an atmosphere in Russia in defence of the Orthodox church allowed for the regime to pursue less tolerant positions there.

In areas where Catholics were only a small minority such as in Belarus or Moldova, the state found it much easier to attack their communities. In Moldova, every Catholic church was closed except for a small chapel in Kishinev. The priest in this church was forced to only use German or Polish during the masses, which deprived it of seeking potential converts among the local population. He was also denied permission to visit the rural communities. In the largest of such communities in Rashkovo, the church was wrecked on Christmas Day 1977 by a detachment of militia, and the religious activists who were guarding the church were temporarily arrested.

Roman Catholic Bishops in Lithuania were denied the right to visit the Vatican in 1986 and Pope John Paul II was not allowed to visit Lithuania in 1987 on the 600th anniversary of the signing of the treaty of union between Lithuania and Poland which led to Lithuania's conversion.

== Jews ==
By the 1980s the number of legally authorized synagogues in the Soviet Union had dropped to 50 and rabbinical training had long since been prohibited.

== Samizdat ==
In order to print their own material, believers often used 'samizdat' (underground press), which became increasingly widespread in the later years of the USSR. Samizdat was the illegal publishing of works carried out by religious groups, dissidents, and many others who wanted to avoid the official censorship.

For believers this often took the form of some text from the scriptures, prayers or writings of the church fathers, which were handwritten with an attached instruction to make nine more copies and to send these copies to other addressees, or else God would punish them (and those addressees would then copy and send another nine, and so on). The state employed historical revisionism of its history, and therefore accounts of the state's crimes had to be printed in Samizdat. Some of the most popular of samizdat letters contained excerpts from the Book of Revelation.

The state was aware of these letters (which sometimes even produced fake samizdat that was spread among believers in order to sow distrust among them). They were viciously attacked by the atheist press, for supposedly containing all sorts of evil anti-soviet and hateful writings, as well as for being used in an inhuman manner (e.g. the journal Science and Religion reported many supposed situations where the letters arrived in the middle of a family tragedy, wherein they could duplicate the letters but, in their gried, they tried to fulfill the instruction out of fear of divine punishment by getting a child to do it, who would therefore become traumatized by being exposed to religious propaganda).

Attempts to import religious literature from the West were treated as anti-Soviet subversion. Jehovah's Witness's literature was treated likewise.

In April 1982, five young Orthodox Christians were arrested in Moscow for having illegally possessed a Xerox copier that they used to print thousands of religious books and brochures, which they allegedly sold for a profit. It was disproved in court that they had made profit from the enterprise, but they were given three and four year prison sentences. Further searches of their associates revealed more caches of religious literature.

== Legislative measures ==
Two new decrees issued by the RSFSR Supreme Soviet on 18 March 1966 (219 and 220) assigned penalties of fines for people who organized religious meetings for youth and children or for failing to register a religious community, and also assigned a penalty of imprisonment for people who repeatedly violated this law.

In the late 1960s most of the human rights movements in the Soviet Union developed under the slogan of defence of Soviet legality and demanded that Soviet officials respect their own laws (since the acts used in the persecutions were often technically illegal under Soviet law). Internal instructions were used as a basis for much of the persecutions, however, and they usually trumped Soviet law in practice.

In 1975 the Council for Religious Affairs (CRA) was given an official legal supervision role over the church (prior to this it had unofficial control). Every parish was placed at the disposal of the CRA, which alone had the power to grant registration. It was illegal for a religious community to practice their faith without CRA approval (including public prayers, meeting together, etc.) Until a religious community was registered was the CRA, it could not practice its faith. In order to be registered it needed to submit a petition to the local government which would then send it to the CRA with its own comments and recommendations within a period of no longer than one month. The CRA, however, could take as much time as it chose before it came to the decision of registering a parish. This greatly weakened the church, which earlier had only needed to deal with local government with which it had the power to appeal. The new policy was designed to more greatly strangle the Church. This was accompanied by intimidation, blackmail and threat to the clergy, and as a whole it was meant to demoralize the Church.

This legislation did, however, strengthen the church by admitting the Church's legal status to build and own secular buildings for residence or administrative use, or for the production of articles necessary for the given religious cult.

The Soviet Constitution of 1977 was sometimes interpreted by authorities as containing a requirement for parents to raise their children as atheists. This had been preceded by the new family legislation in 1968 and the laws on national education in 1973. These laws maintained that it was the duty of parents to raise their children as communists and atheists. The family code allowed for courts to deprive parents of their rights over their children if they failed in this task, and the constitution implied this as well. These legal restrictions were only enforced selectively when the authorities chose to do so.

The 1977 constitution in Article 124 also replaced the terminology 'freedom of antireligious propaganda' (from the old constitution) with the new phrase 'freedom of atheistic propaganda'. This was interpreted as a difference between a negative approach of destroying religion and a positive approach of replacing it with an atheistic culture.

The CPSU Central Committee in 1979 called for the implementation of concrete measures for the escalation of atheistic education, and to 'raise the responsibility of communists and Komsomol members in the struggle against religious superstitions'. This was seen as signal to intensify anti-religious propaganda by CP organizations, the mass media, higher and secondary schools, as well as institutions of culture and scientific research.

The Moscow Patriarchate successfully applied pressure in order to get revision of some of the anti-religious legislation. In January 1981, the clergy were requalified in their tax status from being taxed as a private commercial enterprise (as they were before) to being taxed as equal to that of medical private practice or private educators. This new legislation also gave the clergy equal property and inheritance rights as well as the privileges that were granted to citizens if they were war veterans. The parish lay organization of 20 persons who owned the parish was granted the status of a legal person with its appropriate rights and the ability to make contracts (the church had been deprived of this status by Lenin in 1918). For the first time in many years, religious societies could legally own their houses of worship. There was still some ambiguity left in this legislation, however, which allowed room for re-interpretation if the state wished to halt 'uncontrolled' dissemination of building new churches.

The CC issued another resolution in 1983 that promised for ideological work against religion to be the top priority of party committees on all level.

Religious societies were given control over their own bank accounts in 1985.

This legislation in the 1980s marked a new attitude of acceptance towards religion by a state that decided that best it could do was simply to minimize the harmful impact of religion. While the state tried to intensify persecution during the 1980s, the church came to see this increasingly as merely rearguard attacks by an ideologically bankrupt, but still physically powerful, enemy. The top party leaders refrained from direct involvement in the new offensive, perhaps due to an uncertainty over their potential success and a desire to have some flexibility according to a desire to avoid antagonizing believers too much on the eve of the millennial anniversary of Russia's conversion to Christianity.

Religious bodies could still be heavily infiltrated by state agents, due to the power of local governments to reject elected parish officials and install their own people in the lay organization that owned the parish, which meant that even if they had ownership over their churches, it was still effectively in the state's hands. The largest gain of this new legislation, however, was that children of ten years of age and over could actively participate in religious ritual (e.g. service as acolytes, psalmists, in choirs) and that children of any age could be present inside a church during services as well as receive communion.

== Psychiatric abuse ==
Soviet psychiatric practice considered that highly educated people who became religious believers at a mature age, especially if they came from atheist families, suffered from a psychotic disorder. This diagnosis was especially used for monks or nuns as well as for well-educated preachers. This practice allowed for popular monks and nuns (or other believers) who otherwise could not be plausibly charged with any other crime, to be removed and sent to psychiatric facilities. Since their faith was considered to be a mental disorder, people who were given this treatment were given immediate release if they renounced their faith in God and therefore had become "cured".

Particular cases of this that are known include:

The religious nationalist Gennady Shimanov was interned for two and half months in 1962 in a psychiatric hospital that administered insulin shock therapy to cure him of his religious belief. He was interned again in 1969 for a few weeks after which he was released as a result of public attention of his incarceration.

Fr Iosif Mikhailov of Ufa who was sent to the Kazan psycho-prison in 1972 and remained there for up to at least the last years of communism.

Valeria (Makeev), a nun at the same facility from 1978 up to at least the last years of communism. She was initially accused of black-marketing (for selling religious articles to believers), but when the case for this failed to materialize, she was instead diagnosed as psychotic.

Fr Lev Konin was sent to psycho-prison several times before he was expelled to the West in 1979. He had contacts with Leningrad students and had spoken at an unofficial religio-philosophic seminar of young Soviet intellectuals in Leningrad.

Yurii Belov, a student of history and literature, was sent to the Sychevcka psycho-prison and was told in 1974 by a representative of the central Moscow Serbsky Institute of Forensic Medicine: 'In our view religious convictions are a form of pathology, hence our use of drugs'.

A 33-year-old doctor, Olga Skrebets with a PhD in medical sciences, was diagnosed with an early stage of schizophrenia and sent to a hospital in Kyiv in 1971 after she had withdrawn from CPSU membership for religious reason.

The 44-year-old Baptist, Alexander Yankovich, had engaged in unofficial writing and duplication of religious literature from 1957 to 1976. In 1976 he was arrested and declared insane.

Evgenii Martynov, a thirty-five-year-old Pentecostal civil engineer was sent to the Cherniakhovski psycho-prison in 1978.

Vasilii Shipilov, an Orthodox layman, was sentenced to ten years' hard labour in 1939 at the age of 17 for being a student at an underground seminary. In 1949, after his release, he roamed Siberia and proclaimed the Kingdom of God as well as criticized Stalin's abuses. He was soon rearrested and declared insane. He spent most of the period between 1950 and 1979 in psycho-prisons, where he was subject to constant beatings and mockery of his religion.

A twenty-year-old history student named Galliamov was baptized when he was eighteen and had spent the summer of 1978 as a pilgrim at the few remaining monasteries. He was diagnosed a 'psychopath of mixed type' and subjected to high doses of neuroleptics, causing him nausea, high fever and heart attacks. He was released after two months and warned by the doctor to stop visiting monasteries or else his condition might evolve into schizophrenia.

One of the most blatant of such cases occurred in 1976 to 25-year-old Moscow intellectual, Alexander Argentov, a neophyte Orthodox Christian from an atheistic family. He had founded the Moscow-based religio-philosophic seminar in 1974, headed by Alexander Ogorodnikov (a graduate student of cinematography that was expelled from the institute along with others for trying to produce a film about religious life among Soviet youth). This seminar declared itself the successor of the religio-philosophic societies of Moscow and Leningrad that had been dispersed in the 1920s. The seminar began to be harassed in earnest in 1976 after it had grown considerably and shown much vitality, as well as established itself in Ufa (Bashkiria), Leningrad, L'vov (Ukraine), Minsk and Grodno (Belarus). Argentov and others were arrested and locked up in psychiatric institutions. Argentov's religious belief was diagnosed as a psychotic disorder. Powerful neuroleptics were administered to him for two months before he was released after wide publicity and protests of his case which reached outside the USSR.

== Activities ==
There were no radical revisions of official state policies after Khrushchev (much of his campaign was carried out under secret unpublished instructions anyway). Most of the closed churches would remain closed and none of the closed seminaries or monasteries would be reopened. Believers tried unsuccessfully to reopen many churches. In the late 1970s and into the 1980s the state did begin to allow more churches to be built and reopened.

Those convicted of religious crimes in the Soviet Union were given especially harsh treatments and were classed (along with political dissidents) as "especially dangerous state criminals", which disqualified them from amnesty or leniency. Religious crimes such as circulating a petition or organizing religious classes for children could be punished with strict terms in concentration camps (assault, robbery and rape had lesser sentences in the USSR) and could not be considered for parole without a formal confession.

In the entire region of Sakha-Yakutia (about half the size of the continental United States) there was only one functioning church left open after Khrushchev until the fall of communism, which meant that many believers needed to travel up to 2000 kilometres in order to get the nearest church.

The following are examples of situations known to history of these activities. In the city of Chernigov, the cathedral was closed in 1973 and only a small wooden church remained. The believers had been petitioning for a new church since 1963, but never received anything until the fall of communism. In the city of Gorky, there were only three small churches remaining to serve an estimated population of 100,000 believers (out of 40 pre-1917, when the population of Gorky was 1/15th what it was in the 1970s). The believers had been petitioning for some churches to reopened since 1967, and the petitioners were subject to professional demotions, and their demands were ignored. In the town of Naro Fominsk in the Moscow Province petitions began in 1968 to open a church. There had been no church in the vicinity of the town since the 1930s. Their petitions were ignored and given negative replies. The local atheist press claimed that no new church could be given since the existing church was going to be transformed into a museum and the press claimed there were not enough practicing Christians in the city to merit it (there were in fact 1443 signatories to the petition). The atheist press also claimed that this petition was being issued by evil people who were trying to heat up religious fanaticism and gain a cushy job at a new church. The believers presented their case in court, but were unsuccessful.

A notorious church closure occurred in 1968 in the rural town of Kolyvan in the vicinity of Novosibirsk. The church of Alexander Nevsky in that town was built in the 18th century and was one of the oldest architectural monuments in the region. The local CRA plenipotentiary, Nikolaev, had been boasting for years that he would turn the church into a museum. The local fire department requested that a special water reservoir should be built next to the church to protect it from fire, and the church council complied with this request, by digging the reservoir. Shortly afterwards, the local militia declared this to be an illegal construction and confiscated the building materials from the church council so that they could not complete building the reservoir. Then the Soviet government declared the church to be unsafe due to a lack of a water reservoir, and ordered the church to be closed. In 1974, the historic church was dismantled and its pieces were sold. The local community tried to continue having services without a priest in the watchman's house in the church yard, but this was met with harassment and short arrests of the organizers. Nikolaeve eventually agreed to give them a twenty square-metre basement to hold services for their congregation of 200.

Another notorious closure occurred in 1979 in the town of Rechitsa in Belarus. The church was too small for the congregation and they requested to enlarge it. They received permission and began to do construction at their own expense. Once they finished the expansion, the building was declared a fire hazard and closed, militia guards were placed in front of it to prevent believers from using it.

An 18th-century church in the village of Mshany in Lvov diocese was closed in March 1978 and turned into grain storage. In 1979, believers surrounded the church and tried to physically prevent grain from being stored in the church. The militia was dispatched to disperse them and one woman was arrested. The believers launched unsuccessful petitions on behalf of the church.

In the village of Znosychy near Rovno in Volhynia, there was a church that had been deprived of a priest for several years, and which had been taken care of by its congregation who also gathered there for prayers. In 1977 the authorities tried to demolish the church but were stopped by resistance from the local community, and instead they tried to store grain inside the church. In response, the local village went on strike, and the authorities decided to remove the grain. On 25 April 1979 the entire population of Znosychy was ordered to work in an adjacent village, while the children were locked up in school, and during this time the church was demolished. Afterwards, believers began to gather at the site of the former church for prayers and pilgrims would come to the village. The authorities responded by putting up patrols and barriers around the village to prevent visitors. The believers also began to decorate pine trees around the church and pray under them. The authorities responded by cutting down the trees.

In two other villages in Rovno, the local population tried to reopen churches closed under Khrushchev. In one of these in 1973, while the believers were at work, the authorities dismantled the domes and stored grain in the church. The population protested furiously and the grain was removed. In 1978, after years of complaints, an official commission arrived to investigate, but they were told that believers were a tiny minority in the area by the local authorities and the commission left. In the other village, in 1973 the believers made vain appeals to re-open their churches, but they were told in reply to go to another town for services. In the autumn of 1978, a CRA representative came and promised to give them their church back, and in the meantime the local authorities asked the villagers to sign a pledge not to let their pigs roam the village streets. The villagers signed the document without reading it, and it turned out to be pledge that no one wanted a church in the village. The document was then used by the district authorities to justify their refusal to accept any more pleas to reopen the church.

Many more examples beyond these exist.

In 1983 at least over 300 of all religions were in some sort of imprisonment solely for practicing their faith. Other estimates are far higher and this figure does not include the masses of believers who were subject to administrative harassment and persecutions from day to day. These figures of course are little in comparison, however, with what occurred earlier in the USSR's history.

These persecutions could result from acts of charity (which were still illegal according to the 1929 legislation). Such illegal acts of charity could include bishops who secretly gave money to poorer parishes that could not pay for their repairs, clergy and parish staff who gave money to poor parishioners, giving money to parishioners who suffered loss of homes from fires, or believers giving public dinners to people, including pilgrims.

They could result from group pilgrimages to holy places (which was also still illegal). These pilgrimages were subjected to very brutal attacks by militia and Komsomol voluntary aides leading to physical injuries and the state claimed that they were organized by either fanatic believers or opportunists trying to make income.

Persecutions could also result from either worship or performance of religious rites in private dwellings, or doing it in churches without reporting them to the state. There was official pressure against people getting baptism and there were often practical difficulties of obtaining a baptism in areas without churches. Few couples had traditional Christian marriage ceremonies. Religious rites were sometimes done secretly in order to protect believers from harassment at work or in school, since the record books that churches had to keep were regularly inspected by the KGB. The state reported that such activities were done by priests who were trying to earn extra income from unrecorded donations. This paradigm was cited by Feodosii, the former bishop of Poltava in his 1977 letter to Brezhnev where he stated that most adults who converted to Orthodoxy went to retired priests for baptisms, because they could perform baptisms without having to enter the names of the newly baptized into the registry. The provincial CRA official found out about this and demanded that every baptismal candidate be reported, after which CRA agents would attempt to create many problems at the candidate's place of work or study in order to dissuade him from receiving baptism. The Bishop refused to cooperate with this.

The Komsomol was still engaged in vandalism of churches and harassment of believers during this period (as it was during the 1930s when it was also criticized for laxity).

Priests and bishops who did not completely subordinate themselves to the state and/or who engaged in religious activities outside of the routine performance of religious rites, were considered to be enemies of the state. Bishops criticized for 'high religious activity' were moved around the country. The Council for Religious Affairs claimed to have gained control of the Patriarch's Synod, which was forced to co-ordinate its sessions and decisions with the CRA.

The widespread persecution of clergy under Khrushchev was replaced with a more selective persecution of simply the most dedicated priests, especially if they attracted young people, or offered pastoral guidance. The CRA had a policy to appoint priests who were not wanted, and the state continued to find means to shut down churches. At the same time, however, the CRA claimed that the church's position was improving under newly passed legislation.

The church hierarchy could have no disciplinary powers. While the state allowed for freedom of sermons and homilies, this freedom was limited in that they could only be of an 'exclusively religious character' (in practice this meant that clergymen who preached against atheism and the state ideology were not protected). All of the anti-religious legislation was designed to make the church as passive as possible. Lukewarm clergy were tolerated while clergy with a missionary zeal could be deregistered. This was in accordance both with Lenin's teaching that immoral or even criminal priests should be preferred over active and popular ones, and it was also in accordance with a secret 1974 CRA resolution 'On the State of Supervision over the Activities of the Theological Educational Establishments of the Russian Orthodox Church' in which it was resolved to study seminary candidates, to take measures to prevent 'fanatical' (i.e. actively religious) people from entering seminaries as teachers or students, to elevate the sense of citizenship among teachers and students, as well as to enhance political education for teachers and students so as to give them 'profound patriotic convictions'.

A massive number of cases could be cited of clergy who were persecuted for being dedicated priests. Examples include:

Vasilii Boiko, a young Kyiv priest, lost his position as the choir director at the Virgin Mary Protection church in Kyiv for organizing a youth choir, consisting of recent converts and reverts. The choir was disbanded and he was sent as a reader to a provincial church.

Zdriliuk, a young Kyiv engineer and convert to Orthodoxy, was privately ordained a priest after passing theological examinations. Three years after his ordination he was de-registered following a police search of his house that revealed a cache of religious literature as well as his distribution of such literature to believers.

Paganism was reported to have re-appeared in areas where the church had been eliminated.

Cases of less preferential treatment occurred in the cases of believers who had greater educational or professional levels. Party members, administrative personnel of the high and middle executive categories, teachers and professors of all types, army officers and personnel of the Ministry of Internal Affairs, and other such people would incur direct persecution for baptizing their children. Often they had to find priests who would agree to do perform the sacrament secretly. Peasants and workers rarely suffered the same degree of consequences for engaging in religious activities. The uneducated and elderly in the post-Khrushchev years were generally left alone.

Almost no new clerical ordinations were allowed in Ukraine during this period. There were bans on home-educated candidates as well. Unsuccessful candidates to seminaries anywhere in the country could face all sorts of harassment and persecution.

Archbishop Feodosii reported in his account that he refused to cooperate with the local plenipotentiary when the latter wanted to close churches, and after this he was transferred to the north-Russian diocese of Vologda where there was only 17 open churches. The Archbishop listed a number of direct and indirect persecutions employed by the CRA almost daily. Included among such things were methods like him being attacked for sending priests to replace sick priests during a Sunday liturgy without permission, and temporarily depriving the replacement priest of registration. Attempts to replace structures falling into dilapidation with better ones resulted in the new brick structures being torn down by militia and komsomol. The Bishop was criticized for supporting petitions to Moscow. He also cited CRA pressure to raise peace fund contributions and historical monuments contribution, from 36,210 roubles in 1968 to 161,328 roubles in 1976 (while the diocese only received 124,296 roubles in donation). Parishes had to increase their donations in order to meet this, and eventually the diocese fell into debt. This resulted in more parishes being closed for lack of funds.

Harassment of pilgrims and monasteries increased in the early 1980s.

== Notable atrocities and victims ==
Two priests named Nikolai Eshliman and Gleb Yakunin received worldwide fame after issuing a brave memoranda to the Soviet government and to Patriarch Alexii in 1965, which protested the persecution, the forced closure of churches and the inactivity of the Patriarchs and bishops in defending the church. Shortly afterwards the atheist press conducted a campaign of character assassination. They claimed that Yakunin had become a priest for purely pecuniary reasons. Yakunin and Eshliman had, like many other Christian evangelists in the USSR, attempted to acquire illegal religious publications, including from the west. This fact allowed the state to then brand the men as well laity connected with them as criminals, black-marketeers and even being connected with Western intelligence services (who were allegedly sending religious and theological literature into the USSR for purposes of ideological subversion).

On 15 November 1966, the church of the Holy Trinity was demolished in Leningrad.

A notable case was reported in Samizdat documents concerning Vladimir Rusak (a.k.a. Vladimir Stepanov), a Russian Orthodox deacon and a graduate of the Moscow Theological Academy who had worked as one of the editors of the Journal of Moscow Patriarchate. In 1980 he complete a manuscript about the history of the Russian church under the Soviet Union, which was critical of the state. His immediate superior, Archbishop Pitirim, discovered this and ordered him to destroy it, but he refused, and he was sent to Vitebsk in Belarus to serve a church there. On 28 March 1982 he gave a sermon at a Passion service on the Passion of Christ and the suffering of the church in the world, and he claimed that a persecuted Church was spiritually stronger and closer to God than a triumphant Church, and in this context he condemned the post-Constantine legacy of national and state churches, and he praised the Bolshevik Revolution for having once again raised persecution against the Church, which therefore purified the Church of all but those who were truly dedicated to it. In the same sermon he discussed the persecutions of the state and condemned the hierarchy for disowning the martyrs, to whom he claimed the Church owed its survival. He told the parishioners not to lose heart in the wake of the atheist persecution, and that one should not expect both an easy life on earth and a reward in heaven. After this sermon, he was de-registered and sent to a monastery, and his superiors said they could do nothing to help because of KGB pressure upon them. He was recommended to get a secular job, because there was no longer any position in the church that would be allowed to him.

Fr Dimitry Dudko was a popular preacher and catechist in Moscow, who prepared hundreds of adults for baptism. He began to hold question-and-answer sessions instead of regular sermons at this church, and this made him very popular among people but very unpopular among the authorities. He was one of the most influential religious dissidents of the time. Under their pressure he was forced to be removed in 1973 to the rural parish of Kabanovo, eighty kilometres outside of Moscow. Foreigners who visited his church in Moscow could not go to that area, but many people began flocking to his new church. In December 1975 the local soviet forced the church council to dismiss Fr. Dimitry from this parish, and thereafter he was transferred to another rural parish in the vicinity of Moscow. At that parish he began to create a well-knit church community and published a mimeographed bulletin (the first time this was used in Russia since the 1920s). In his writings and sermons he attacked atheism and blamed it for moral decline and rising alcoholism. In January 1980 he was arrested and within six months he appeared on state TV with a speech of apology wherein he condemned his past behaviour. The state magnanimously forgave him and allowed him to return to his pastoral duties, and much of his previous following deserted him.

Fr Vasilii Romaniuk of the village of Kosmach in the Carpathians was criticized for organizing illegal carol-singing youth groups and visiting believers' homes during Christmas-time. The CRA claimed that he was trying to earn extra money through donations. Four years after this, he was arrested and given 10 years in jail, a labour camp and enforced internal exile for appending his signature on behalf of a Ukrainian nationalist named Valentyn Moroz. He has been sentenced in 1944 to ten years of hard labour in Siberia. He attended pastoral courses and was ordained a deacon in 1959, but the local CROCA plenipotentiary refused to allow him ordination to the priesthood. In 1964, he became a priest, and acquired a good reputation among believers as well as a bad reputation among the authorities, the latter of which harassed him continually. He was forced to change six parishes, before being arrested in 1972 for the aforementioned crime involving Moroz.

Fr Pavel Adelgeim was arrested in December 1969 in Kagan in Uzbekistan where he served as rector of the only local Orthodox church. He was accused of having attracted children and teenagers to the church. He was also accused of being a sadist who beat his wife and the young girls who came to his church. He had produced writings that criticized the legal status of religion in the USSR, criticizing the official ideology, and he had also had contacts with Eshliman and Yakunin. He was sentenced to three years hard labour, and he lost one of his legs during his time in the camp. After his release he became priest in the Uzbek town of Fergana. The previous pastor of the church he came to had been expelled by the parishioners for corruption with parish finances, inappropriate observation of religious rituals and other problems. The CRA, however, thought that this priest should remain and the more popular Fr Pavel was deprived of his registration in order to replace him.

Gleb Yakunin, a famous priest who had gathered information on persecutions that he sent to Western journalists and churches in the West, was arrested in 1979 for anti-Soviet agitation and propaganda; he was sentenced to five years in a strict regime labour camp followed by another five years of internal exile. His position on the unofficial committee that was sending these reports was inherited by Fr Vasilii Fonchenkov and Fr Nikolai Gainov, the latter of whom lost his teaching position at the Moscow theological academy and was soon after transferred to a rural parish outside of Moscow, which made his work on the committee impossible. This committee, while organized by Orthodox priests, sent reports on behalf of all Christians in the USSR.

Fr Alexandr Pivovarov, a very popular and dedicated Siberian priest, was arrested in 1983 and given a 3 1/2-year sentence for distributing free religious literature, which he had acquired from secret Christian printers who were also arrested and sentenced.

Fr Pavel (Lysak) was expelled from the Moscow Theological Academy at the Trinity St Sergius Monastery in 1975. He was also deprived of residence rights in Moscow province, where many of his spiritual children lived. Soviet law allowed him to visit Moscow on three-day visits, and he took full advantage of this, but neighbours of the apartment that he lived at in Moscow were intimidated by the KGB to denounce him in such a way that he could be found guilty of breaking the law, and in 1984 he was arrested and sentenced to ten months in a labour camp.

One of the most appalling cases was reported to have occurred in the summer of 1983 in the Caucasus sixty kilometres outside of Sukhumi where an unregistered monastic community was discovered and dispersed. Eighteen of the monks, however, hid themselves in a narrow cave and continued their community. The authorities brought barrels filled with an incendiary mixture, dumped them at the mouth of the cave and set them on fire, so that the eighteen were burned to death.

Fr Nikolai Ivasiuk, in the city of Chardzhou in Turkmenistan, was found murdered on 17 December 1978. His hair was torn out, his eyes were removed, his body had been burned and there were knife wounds as well as carvings on him. The previous night believers reported having seen a car pull up with six militiamen leaving the car and entering the house. The murderers were not found in any following investigation.

In Vilnius in Lithuania, a very popular Catholic priest named Bronius Laurinavičius was reportedly thrown by four men onto a thoroughfare where he was killed by an approaching truck. Less than a year later, a lay dissident activist, Valeri Smolkin was told by the KGB to emigrate or else he would share Bronius' fate.

In October 1981 at the Holy Virgin Protection Convent in Kyiv, on the patronal feast day when there were masses of pilgrims, there was a police raid. This convent was often subject to such harassment and administrative fines, and police raids often came to capture overnight pilgrims.

The famous Pskov Monastery of the Caves was successfully infiltrated by the KGB when their informer Gavriil became abbot of the monastery after the death of his predecessor. Gavriil then began throwing out pilgrims, harassing revered monks for giving counsel or hearing confession, and he forbade group prayers. The Patriarch received many complaints about him and ordered his removal, but the Soviet Government rescinded the order and insisted he remain in place. Gavriil in 1983 was reported for having conducted violent beatings of the monks and pilgrims.

The Trinity St Sergius Lavra in Zagorsk had forty of their monks expelled between 1975 and 1980. These monks were popular among pilgrims as spiritual advisors and confessors, which led to their expulsion.

Of all of the monastic communities, however, the Pochaev Lavra continued to suffer some of the worst persecutions to be reported. The Soviets had granted permits to very few novices to enter this monastery in order to keep down the number of the monks. In 1979 the monastery launched a petition to request the return of the land that had been confiscated under Khrushchev, as well as to let it accept more novices. The confiscated land had been turned into a museum of atheism and a polyclinic. The authorities responded to this petition by launching more searches and expulsions of pilgrims as well as the expulsion of ten novices. The highly revered spiritual father Amvrosii was expelled in 1981, and his library, which contained samizdat and religious literature, was investigated by the KGB. This was followed by the arrest of more monks, one of whom, Archimandrite Alimpi, was beaten to death, and another named Pitirim became mentally ill as a result of beatings.

The aforementioned Argentov seminar continued to be harassed after its leadership was sent to psychiatric institutions. The new chairman Alexander Ogordnikov was forced to resign his janitor's job after it was discovered he had used his janitor's hut for seminar meetings. The authorities prevented him from getting a new job, and in 1979 he was arrested and sentenced to one year's hard labour for parasitism. While he was still at the camp at the end of his term, he was re-tried and accused of anti-Soviet propaganda; he was sentenced to an additional six years' hard labour followed by another five years of internal exile.

The seminar increased in popularity and numbers, however. It expanded to Kazan, Odesa and Smolensk after Ogordonikov's arrest. In February 1979 there was a joint conference of the Leningrad and Moscow seminars. The regime reacted with various forms of unofficial harassment, including a severe anonymous beating of one of its members. This was followed by numerous KGB warnings, raids, termination of jobs and temporary arrests of the whole membership. Tat'iana Shchipkova, a professor of French and Latin at the Smolensk Pedagogical Institute and the seminar's representative in Smolensk, lost her teaching position in July 1978 and several who had attended the seminar who were students were expelled. She was deprived of her doctoral degree by the end of August 1978 on political grounds. In January 1980 she was sentenced to three years' hard labour after she had slapped a Komsomol member on the face during a raid of a seminar meeting. Other notables arrests included Sergei Ermolaev and Igor Poliakov who were sentenced respectively to four and three-and-a-half-years' hard labour in September 1979 for shouting anti-Soviet slogans. In April 1980, member Viktor Popkov and Vladimir Burtsev were sentenced to eighteen months' hard labour for allegedly counterfeiting documents. Shortly afterwards, seminar leader Vladimir Proesh was sentenced to five years' hard labour in strict regime camps followed by three years of internal exile. Just before his term ended, he was given an additional three years' labour camp in October 1983. This long series of arrests resulted in the seminar being effectively shut down.

The 53-year-old writer and journalist, Zoia Krakhmal'nikova was a former member of the Soviet Union of Writers. She had converted to Orthodoxy as an adult and published religious samizdat. She published excerpts of the writings of the Church Fathers as well as modern Orthodox theologians, articles by converts, excerpts from the lives of the saints, and post-1917 Russian religious writing. There was very little political element in her writing beyond short biographical notes of people who had been killed by the Soviets. She was arrested and tried on 4 August 1982 and put on trial on 1 April 1983 after a long series of investigations. She was sentenced to one year in prison, followed by five years of internal exile under surveillance.

A baptist named Valerii Barinov wrote and recorded a Christian rock opera entitled 'The Trumpet Call' around 1982. In January 1983, he and his friend Sergei Timokhin sent a petition to be able to give legal religious concerts. In response, the Soviet press launched a campaign of character assassination. In March 1984, the two were detained in Murmansk and accused of trying to cross the border to Scandinavia. Barinov was sentenced to two and a half years' hard labour. Barinov declared a hunger strike and requested either emigration or to be declared innocent. The authorities force-fed him. He was released in September 1986.

In 1985, 'The Trumpet Call' was translated into English and re-recorded by British bass guitarist Dave Markee under the moniker The Dave Markee Band. The album was released in the U.S. on Fortress Records, a division of the Christian rock label Refuge Records.

== The millennium ==
In the years leading up to the 1988 millennial anniversary of Russia's conversion to Christianity, the church and the state fought over the meaning of the event and the role of the Church in Russia's history as well as culture. The state returned some of the most valued of religious sites in the country to the Church as a gesture of goodwill (such as the ancient monastery of St Daniel in Moscow that had been used as a juvenile prison, a warehouse and a factory, with the church sanctuaries deliberately used as public lavatories; the church would pay 5 million rubles to rebuild it).

A campaign ran through the media that the Church had no legitimate claim to being the source or champion of Russian culture and the development as well as survival of the Russian nation. This was a painful subject for Soviet propaganda, due to the USSR's own poor historical record as well as its wholesale destruction of cultural monuments, churches, monasteries and other elements of Russia's heritage. The media, however, nevertheless presented the Soviet state as a champion of the preservation of old cultural and historical monuments, and condemned acts of vandalism against them. The media accused the Church of capitalizing on the anniversary in order to attract attention.

Soviet writers and academics tried to downplay the old thesis that the Slavs had little culture prior to Christianization, and they tried to promote the pagan culture of the country before Christianization as already developed. The 988 date was also downplayed by claiming that the Christianization of the country occurred over a few centuries and that that date was simply when Prince Vladimir forcibly baptized the Kievites. It was also downplayed by inventing (out of thin air) that the city of Kyiv had its 1500th anniversary which was celebrated in 1980–82. They blamed Christianity for freezing Russian culture and that Christianity destroyed the cultural heritage of antiquity. The pre-Christian Kievan state was presented as a world power that benefitted little from Byzantium's influences. Ivan the Terrible was presented as inspired by Christian theology. It was denied that Christianity had introduced monogamy. The role of monasticism in Russia's history was belittled and blackened.

They blamed the Church for a reactionary role in the development of secular culture. The church was also criticized for an alleged lack of patriotism as well as collaboration with invaders of Russia. The church was accused of misinforming people of the past, and church historians and theologians could be held criminally responsible.

The Church's role in history was admitted to be significant, but only in that it was used to strengthen the oppressing classes by teaching the masses to be docile. It was admitted to be progressive only in that it helped progress the supposedly feudal society of Kievan Russia as long as feudalism was a progressive force.

== Conclusion ==
By 1987 the number of functioning churches in the Soviet Union had fallen to 6893 and the number of functioning monasteries to just 18.

The Church and the government remained on unfriendly terms until up to the fall of communism. In practice, the most important aspect of this conflict was that openly religious people could not join the Communist Party of the Soviet Union, which meant that they could not hold any political office. However, among the general population, large numbers remained religious. In 1987 in the Russian SFSR, between 40% and 50% of newborn babies (depending on the region) were baptized and over 60% of all deceased received Christian funeral services.

Arrests and persecution of believers continued under Gorbachev, although some who had been arrested previously were released. The volume of antireligious propaganda did not decrease under Gorbachev in contrast to the general Soviet literary and cultural scene. This received reprimands from the party ideological department as well as a counter-campaign in the antireligious press wherein such writers were criticized.

Gorbachev's government reversed the pattern of his predecessors, however, with regard to creating a fund to protect and restore historical monuments including religious monuments and to educate the nation in a spirit of love and respect for its national history and culture. At the chair of this fund, a practicing Christian was placed and he was permitted to defend Christian culture and the positive role of the Church in the nation's history. Historic accounts of the state's many crimes against religious believers were allowed to be openly published in the final years of the USSR. Another breakthrough that occurred in the final years was the allowance of Christians to respond to atheist attacks in the press, and some Christian writers took the opportunity to criticize the atheist propagandists in the national media. In the national media some articles were printed that argued the decline of Soviet society resulted from a loss of the traditional family, which was held together by Christian ethics and traditions. He also adopted a new religious policy in the last years of the Soviet regime as a result of his own pragmatism, the need for international support and his desire to gain more supporters.

== See also ==
- VIDgital
- Marxist–Leninist atheism
- Persecution of Christians in the Soviet Union
- 1971 Bangladesh genocide
- Kosheh massacres, Egypt
- Maspero demonstrations, Egypt
- Chittagong Hill Tracts conflict
- Antireligious campaigns of the Chinese Communist Party
- Cultural Revolution#Historical relics
- Cambodian genocide
- Operation Blue Star
- 1984 Anti-Sikh riots
- Persecution of Christians in Warsaw Pact countries
- Soviet anti-religious legislation
- USSR anti-religious campaign (1917–1921)
- USSR anti-religious campaign (1921–1928)
- USSR anti-religious campaign (1928–1941)
- USSR anti-religious campaign (1958–1964)
