= Bronius Laurinavičius =

Lithuanian priest

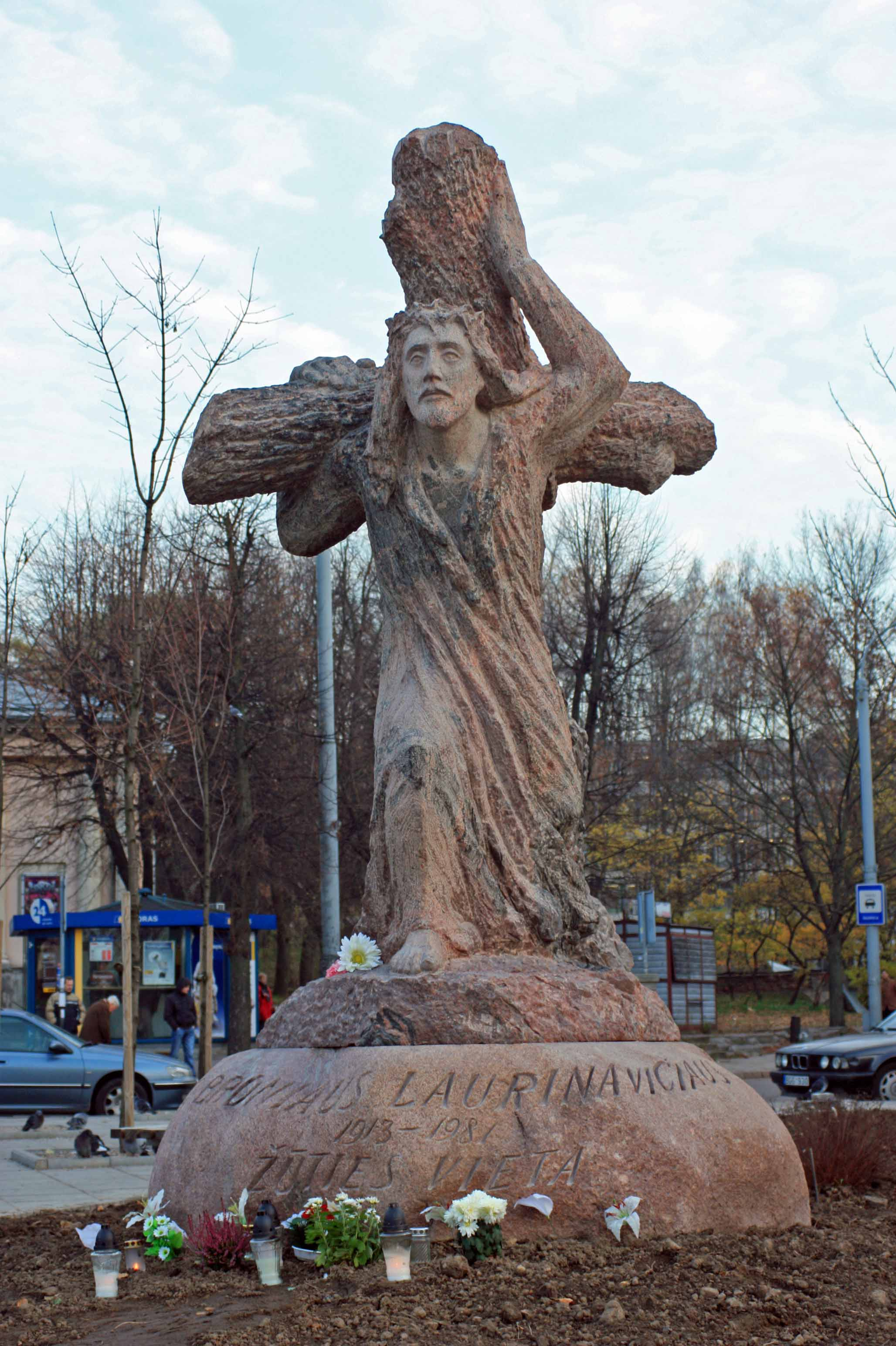
Monument to Laurinavičius in Vilnius (sculptor Antanas Kmieliauskas)

Bronius (Bronislavas) Laurinavičius (17 July 1913 – 25 November 1981) was a Lithuanian priest, member of the Lithuanian Helsinki Group.

He was killed in 1981 after reportedly being thrown by four men affiliated with the KGB onto a street where he was killed by an approaching truck driver. In 1998 he was awarded the Commander's Grand Cross of the Order of the Cross of Vytis.
