= University of 17 November =

Former university for students from the developing world in Czechoslovakia

- Universita 17. listopadu
- Other names: USL
- Type: Public university
- Active: 1961–1974
- Location: Prague, with several campuses around the entire country, Czechoslovakia

The University of 17 November (Czech: Universita 17. listopadu, abbreviated USL)) was a university in Czechoslovakia that existed between 1961 and 1974. It was designed for students from formerly colonized countries in Africa, Asia and Latin America. The name of the school referred to the 17 November 1939 Massacre of Czech university students by the Gestapo.

Modeled after the example of Patrice Lumumba Peoples' Friendship University in USSR and the Herder Institute at the Karl Marx University in East Germany, the aim of the university was to influence the development of future elites in the developing world in line with the ideological views of the Communist regime in Czechoslovakia.

The university was based in Prague but, in line with its aim to expose the students to the socialist society, teaching took place also in Záhrádky, Dobruška, Holešov, Poděbrady, Mariánské Lázně, Senec and Herľany. Following the federalization of Czechoslovakia, the USL opened a second central campus in Bratislava in 1961. Until 1966, the university had three departments - linguistics, social science and sciences. In 1966 the sciences department was discontinued. The university had only two rectors over the course of its existence, both lawyers: Jaroslav Martinic (1961–1969) and Otakar Taufer (1969–1974) The teaching languages were mainly English and French.

The university admitted around 600 students annually from over 60 countries. Most of the students lacked the means to support themselves through their education. Therefore the USL charged no tuition fees and the students were provided with dormitory accommodation, regular meals, as well as a monthly allowance to cover their living costs.

The University was abolished in 1974. The key reasons were high costs, the conflicts between students from different regions and ethnicities as well as between foreign students and local and the high share of alumni, that remained in Czechoslovakia instead of returning home after graduation, which was at odds with the stated aims of the university. The linguistic department was preserved and moved to the Charles University

== Literature ==
- HOLEČKOVÁ, Marta Edith. Příběh zapomenuté univerzity. Prague: Charles University, Faculty of Arts 2019. ISBN 978-80-7308-921-4 (print), ISBN 978-80-7308-922-1 (online: pdf) (in Czech)
