= Church of the Intercession of the Most Holy Mother of God, Volkovskoye =

Church in Sverdlovsk oblast, Russia

- Церковь Покрова Пресвятой Богородицы (Волковское)
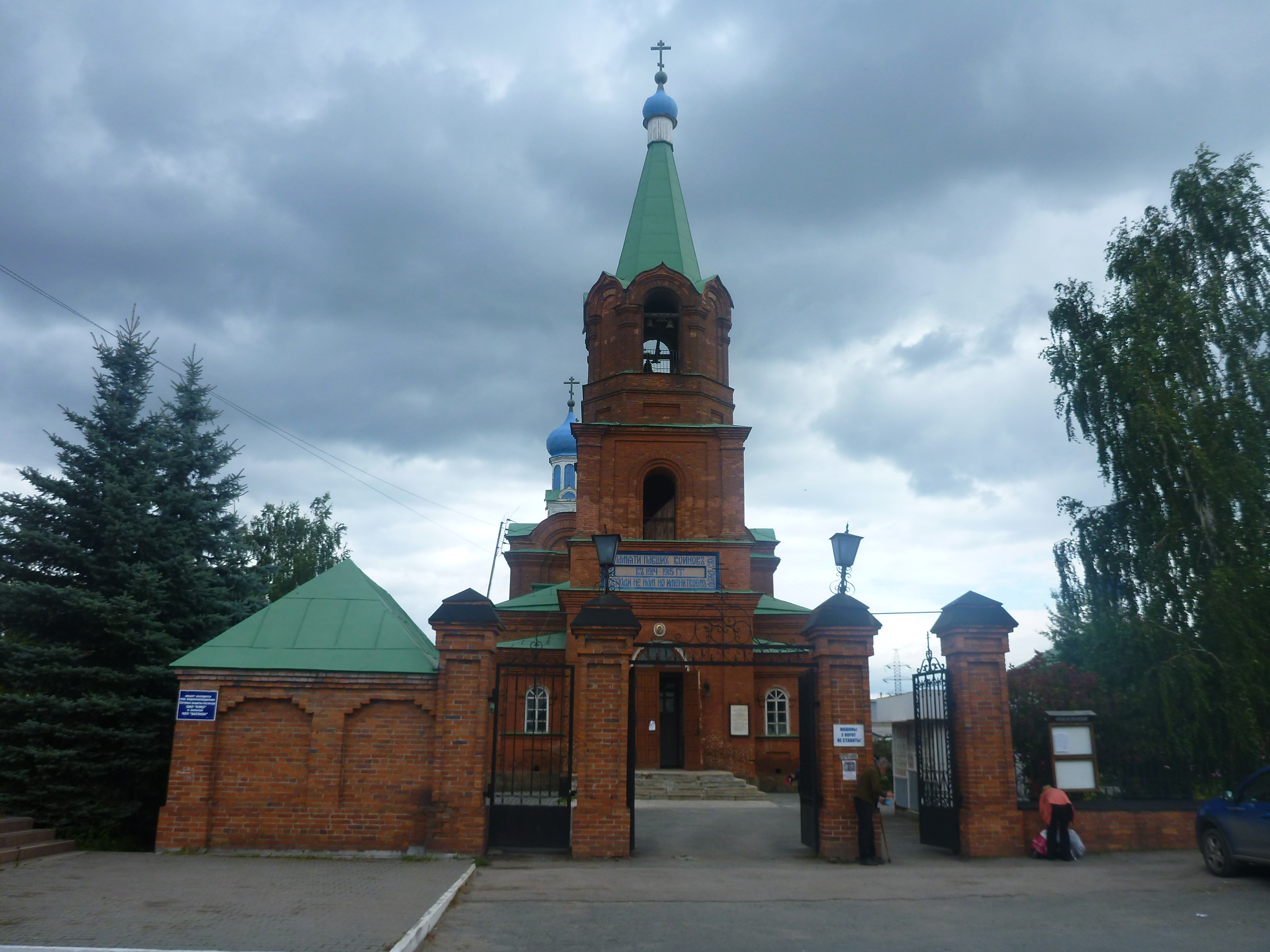
- Interactive map of the Church of the Intercession of the Most Holy Mother of God, Volkovskoye area

General information
- Location: Kamensk-Uralsky, 13 Fevralskoy Revolucii Street
- Coordinates: 56°21′22″N 61°59′38″E
- Completed: 1849

Church of the Intercession of the Most Holy Mother of God is an Orthodox church in Kamensk-Uralsky, Sverdlovsk oblast.

The building was granted the status of regional significance on 28 December 2001 (the Sverdlovsk oblast Government Decree № 859). The object number of cultural heritage of regional significance is 661710983730005.

== History ==
The first wooden church was bought from Travyanskoye village and set in 1849. The building was renovated several times in the early 20th century. Later was decided to build a stone church. The document stated that the church was closed in 1936. During the Soviet period the church didn't function and stood abandoned.

A new stone church was located in the south-eastern part of the town in Volkovo village (nowadays it is a microdistrict). The building was constructed in 1914-1916 in honor of the 100th anniversary of the Victory in the Patriotic War of 1812. It was consecrated in 1916. One of the first priests was Eugene Landyshev. He was arrested in 1917: "Fr. (Father) Eugene is the publisher of a reference book for priests. He gives instructions how to deal with socialism, and also criticizes Bebel ".

Divine services were stopped in 1936. The building was used as a grain storehouse, later as the builders' offices of the Ural Aluminum Combine and Krasnogorskaya Cogeneration. By decision of the Council for Religious Affairs under the Council of Ministers of the USSR, the church was again returned to believers in 1987. During this time the church came to desolation and was almost destroyed. Since 1988, the restoration is underway, the domes and gilded crosses are restored to their places, the interior painting is being restored. Regular services are held. On 2 April 1988 the church was consecrated by Melchizedek, Archbishop of Sverdlovsk and Kurgan.

There is a Sunday church and parish school for children and a library.

== Literature ==
- Свод памятников истории и культуры Свердловской области. Vol. 2. Екатеринбург: Сократ. 2008. p. 648. ISBN 978-5-88664-323-7 – via ред. В.Е.Звагельская.
- Памятники архитектуры Каменска-Уральского / С. И. Гаврилова, Л. В. Зенкова, А. В. Кузнецова, А. Ю. Лесунова — Екатеринбург: Банк культурной информации, 2008. — 92 с.
