= Boris Kandidov =

Russian anti-religious writer (1902–1953)

Boris Pavlovich Kandidov (Russian: Борис Павлович Кандидов, 1902–1953) was a Soviet journalist and anti-religious writer.

== Career ==
Kandidov served in the People's Commissariat of Justice, where he dealt with issues of administrative control over the activities of the Church during the Russian Civil War. In 1923, he organized an anti-religious exhibition in the premises of the Moscow Military Engineering School. The exhibition ceased its work a few months later, but Kandidov, on a personal initiative, kept the exhibits in his apartment. In 1929, they became the basis for the Central Antireligious Museum which opened in the premises of the former Passionate Monastery (Strastnoy Monastery) in Moscow and of which he was the first director. He was a member of the League of Militant Atheists of the USSR. In the late 1920s–1930s Kandidov published a large number of articles on atheistic and anti-church topics. In his publications, he accused the Russian Orthodox Church of reactionary activity in the years of the Russian Revolution and Civil War. He put forward in his book The Hunger of 1921 and the Church that "Every church is a fortress of counter-revolution, every churchman is its agent and a spy!". On this basis, his book justified repressions against believers in God. His book The Church and Espionage sustained five editions in 1937–1940. His books include documentary materials that are not available in other sources. He occupied the extreme positions among his comrades-in-arms in a fight against "church and sectarian leaders [opposed to] the dictatorship of the proletariat".

In autumn 1939, after the annexation of Western Ukraine and Western Byelorussia to the USSR, he advocated the immediate conduct of an anti-church campaign in these territories. This was not approved by higher structures. Kandidov was criticized for political "inflection", and his articles ceased to be published in the central publications. During World War II, Kandidov was a lecturer in Siberia, the Volga region, the Urals, Kazakhstan and Central Asia. While in Kazan in 1945, he opposed the softening of the policy of the Soviet state towards the Church and continued to denounce religion. He wrote a letter to Zhdanov, secretary of the Central Committee of the AUCP (b), proposing again to launch an anti-religious campaign. He sent a report to the Propaganda and Agitation Department of the Central Committee of the AUCP (b), in which he assessed the patriotic activities of the Russian Church during the German-Soviet War as "self-advertisement and deception," condemned the leaders of the council for the Russian Orthodox Church Affairs and the Council for the Affairs of Religious Cults for "repetition of priests' allegations", demanded that the party organs "move from complacency to fighting against churchmen". In the official response of the Office of Propaganda and Agitation, it was said that Kandidov "lives with old views." His work as a lecturer was sharply criticized in the newspaper Pravda, after which Kandidov was removed from the propaganda work. In the late 1940s, he acted as a reviewer of books on anti-church topics.

== Work ==
- Kandidov, Boris Pavlovich. The Church and 1905 / B. P. Kandidov. - [Moscow] : scientific. the Atheist, [1926]. - 123, III p.: Il.;
- Kandidov, Boris Pavlovich. The deification of the Romanov dynasty / Boris Kandidov; Center. the Council of the Union of the godless Soviet Union. - [Moscow] : ACC. ed-tion about "the Infidel", 1927 (Mospoligraf, tipo-lit. "Working case"). - 63 p., [1] p. declared. : slime.;
- Kandidov, Boris Pavlovich. Church front in the world war / Boris Kandidov. - [Moscow] : Scientific. the atheist, [1927] (type. OGPU them. so the thieves). - 147 p., [1] p. declared. : slime.;
  - Church front in the world war / Boris Kandidov. - Ed. 2nd (EXT.). - Moscow : Atheist, 1929. - 158, [1] p.: Il.;
- Kandidov, Boris Pavlovich. A cross and a whip. : (Pochaiv monastery and the black hundred movement) / Boris Kandidov; Cover: K. of P.; Union of the godless Soviet Union. - Moscow : Joint-Stock Company. publishing house "the Atheist" : book factory Center. publishing house of peoples S. S. R., 1928. - 39 p.: Il.;
- Kandidov, Boris Pavlovich. The legend of the Christ in the class struggle : Essays and materials / Boris Kandidov. - [Moscow] : Atheist, [1928] (18 type. "Mospoligraf" to them. M. I. Rogov). - 84 p.: Il.;
  - The legend of the Christ in the class struggle / Boris Kandidov. - 2nd ed. - [Moscow] : Atheist, 1929] ([type. 18-I Mospoligraf). - 80 p.: Il.;
  - The legend of the Christ in the class struggle / Boris Kandidov. - 4th ed. - [Moscow] : Atheist, 1930] ([Ryazan : Ryazan.). - 88 p.: Il.;
- Kandidov, Boris Pavlovich. Religion in the Imperial army / Boris Kandidov; ed, Deputy head of Agitprop Pour and T. Tsirlin; Union of the godless Soviet Union. - [Moscow] : ACC. publishing house "the Atheist", 1928 (type. "Peasant newspaper"publishing house). - 80 p.: Il., Fax.;
  - Religion in the Imperial army / Boris Kandidov; Cover: P. K(Athenian). - 2nd ed. extra, newly revised, proreduction / Deputy head of Agitprop Pour and T. Rodionov. - (Moscow) : Joint-Stock Company. publishing house "the Atheist", 1929 (type. gas. "Truth.)" - 92 p.: Il., Fax.;
- Kandidov, Boris Pavlovich. Monasteries-museums and anti-religious propaganda ... / Boris Kandidov; Union of the godless Soviet Union and Glavpolitprosvet. - Moscow : publishing house of the mechanical joint. the atheist, 1929 (tip. gas. "Truth.)" - 227 p.: Il., Fax.;
- Kandidov, Boris Pavlovich. The Church and the October revolution / E. Kandidov; [Center. Soviet Union of militant atheists of the USSR]. - Moscow : Joint-Stock Company. published. the atheist, 1929 (tip. "Beep.)" - 31 p., [1] p. declared.;
  - The Church and the October revolution / Boris Kandidov; Center. Soviet Union of militant atheists of the USSR. - 2nd ed. - Moscow : Joint-Stock Company. published. the atheist, 1930 (typ. ed. NKVD.) - 32 p.;
- Kandidov, Boris Pavlovich. A religious counter-revolution 1918-20 and intervention : (studies and materials) / Boris Kandidov; Center. Soviet Union of militant atheists of the USSR. - Moscow : joint-stock company. publishing house "the Atheist", 1930. - 148 p.;
- Kandidov, Boris Pavlovich. Religious persecution in Poland / Boris Kandidov; the Central Council of the Union of militant atheists of the USSR. - Moscow : Bezbozhnik, 1930. 55 PP.;
- Kandidov, Boris Pavlovich. Church-the white Cathedral in Stavropol in may, 1919 / Boris Kandidov. - Moscow : Moscow worker, 1930. - 96 p.;
- Kandidov, Boris Pavlovich. Church and counterintelligence: counter-Revolutionary and terrorist activities of churchmen in the South during the civil war. M., 1930;
- Kandidov, Boris Pavlovich. The Church and the Moscow uprising of 1905 / Boris Kandidov. - [Moscow] : Atheist, [1930] (Penza : tip. they. Thievish.) - 68 p.: Il., port.;
- Kandidov, Boris Pavlovich. Sabotage, intervention and Church / Boris Kandidov; Center. the Council of the Union armies. atheists of the USSR. - Moscow : Atheist, 1931 (type. "Der EMEs"publishing house). 72 p.;
- Kandidov, Boris Pavlovich. Who saved the temple of Christ the Savior. / B. Candida; the Central Council of the Union of militant atheists of the USSR. - Moscow; Leningrad : Moscow worker, 1931. - 70, [2] p.
- Kandidov, Boris Pavlovich. The Mensheviks and clericalism in the struggle against the October revolution : (Essays) / Boris Kandidov; Center. the Council of the Union armies. atheists of the USSR. - Moscow; Leningrad : Ogiz - Moscow. worker, 1931 (M.: 13th type. Ogiza). - 109, [2] p.;
- Kandidov, Boris Pavlovich. October battles in Moscow and the Church. Essays / Boris Kandidov; Center. the Council of the Union armies. atheists of the USSR. - Moscow : Atheist, 1931 (type. Beep.) - 40 p.;
- Kandidov, Boris Pavlovich. The Church and Wrangell. / Boris Kandidov. - [Kharkiv] : Proletar, 1931. - 98 p.; 18 cm. - (atheist Library);
- Kandidov, Boris Pavlovich. The Church and the civil war in the South : (materials to the history of religious counter-revolution during the civil war) : according to unpublished archival materials / Boris Kandidov; Center. the Council of the Union armies. atheists of the USSR. - Moscow : Atheist, 1931. - 295 p.;
- Kandidov, Boris Pavlovich. For the Palace of Soviets / Boris Kandidov; Center. the Council of the Union armies. atheists of the USSR. - Moscow; Leningrad : Ogiz - Moscow. worker, 1931 (M.: type. "Der EMEs"publishing house). - 16 p., 1 p. "List of recommended literature" in the region.;
- Kandidov, Boris Pavlovich. Famine of 1921 and the Church. / Boris Kandidov; Center. the Council of the Union armies. atheists of the USSR. - Moscow; Leningrad : Ogiz - Moscow. worker, 1932 (M.: type. "Der EMEs"publishing house). - 92, [2] p., 2 p. declared.;
- Kandidov, Boris Pavlovich. Japanese intervention in Siberia and the Church. / Boris Kandidov; Center. the Council of the Union armies. atheists of the USSR. - Moscow : Gaiz, 1932 (type. Beep.) - Obl. 64 p.: Il.;
- Kandidov, Boris Pavlovich. Participation of churchmen in the civil war and intervention. / p. 101-122 / Militant atheism in the USSR for 15 years. 1917-1932. : a collection / the Central Council of the Union of militant atheists and the Institute of philosophy of the Communist Academy; under the editorship of M. Enisherlova, A. Lukashevskogo, M. Mitina. - Moscow : ogiz : State anti-religious publishing house, 1932. - 525, (2) p.: Il., port.;
- Kandidov, Boris Pavlovich. Imperialist war and religion. : Explained. brochure to the kinopl series. slides / B. Candida; Under the General editorship of C. O. of the Union of militant atheists. - Moscow : [b. I.], 1933. - 44 p.; 16 cm. - (Factory film transparencies trust "Tehfilm" Soyuzkino; No. 851).
- Kandidov, Boris Pavlovich. The Church and the February revolution. : Class position of the Orthodox Church in the period of February.Aug. 1917 : Materials and essays / Boris Kandidov; Center. the Council of the Union armies. atheists of the USSR. - Moscow : ogiz-GAIZ, 1934. - 95 p.: Il.;
- Kandidov, Boris Pavlovich. War and religion. : Method. guide to traveling exhibition / B. P. Kandidov; Center. entirely. Museum of the USSR; Ed. T. M. R. Galaktionov. - Moscow : [b. I.], 1934. - 28 p.;
- Kandidov, Boris Pavlovich. Plot sheet for a series of slides Imperialist war of 1914–18. and religion. / Author B. P. Kandidov, M. R. Galaktionov; f-ka "Diavolo" Paucara. - [Moscow] : Center. the Council of the Union armies. atheists of the USSR, [1935] (typ. f-Ki 7 "Diafoto"). 3 PP.;
- Kandidov, Boris Pavlovich. Imperialist war of 1914-18 and religion. : (Explains. the text is a series of transparencies on glass) / B. Candida; Center. the Council of the Union armies. atheists of the USSR. - Moscow : GOS. anti-religious publishing house, 1936 (type. The profizdat). - 16 p.;
- Kandidov, Boris Pavlovich. Religion in the service of the counter-revolution in 1917 and during the civil war. : Explained. text to a series of transparencies on "Religion and October. revolution" / B. P. Kandidov; Center. the Council of the Union armies. atheists of the USSR. - Moscow : type. "Cu. star", 1936. 15 PP.;
- Kandidov, Boris Pavlovich. The Church and espionage : some facts are counter-revolutionary and espionage activities of religious organizations / Boris Kandidov. - Moscow : Ogiz-Gaiz, 1937. 94 p.;
- Kandidov, Boris Pavlovich. The Church's agents of the Polish gentry // Antireligioznik. 1937. No. 2. 10. P. 14–28.
- Kandidov, Boris Pavlovich. The Church and the autocracy. - Moscow : tipo-Steklov. Promtrest Kuibyshev. district, 1937. - Titus. L., 11 p.; 29×20 cm. - (Microphone materials of the all-Union radio Committee : Exclusively for broadcasting ... / Ed. "To help self-education" No. 102).
- Kandidov, Boris Pavlovich. The Church in the service of the Japanese samurai : On the rights of the manuscript / Candida. - Moscow : [b. I.], 1938. - 6 p.; 30 cm. - (Microphone materials of the all-Union radio Committee. Exclusively for broadcasting. For the agitation and propaganda Sector; 1938. No. 2. 140).
- Kandidov, Boris Pavlovich. Church spies of Japanese imperialism : On the rights of the manuscript / Ed. Candida. - Moscow : [b. I.], 1938. - 10 p.; 30 cm. - (Microphone materials of the all-Union radio Committee. Exclusively for broadcasting. For the agitation and propaganda sector/ Chapters. edited by RMC; No. 23).
