= Anti-Catholicism in the Soviet Union =

Anti-Catholicism in the Soviet Union, including the Soviet Anti-Catholic Campaigns, refer to those concerted efforts taken by the Soviet Union to defame, undermine, or otherwise decrease or limit the role of the Catholic Church in Europe.

== History ==
Prior to the Russian Revolution of 1917, Russia had an Anti-Catholic Tradition, dating back to Ivan the Terrible in the 16th Century and before. In the eyes of the Russian leadership, Catholicism was intrinsically linked with the West; therefore, attempts by the Holy See to expand into Russia meant attempts by the West to expand its culture into Russian territory.

Particularly during and following the reign of Peter the Great, Catholicism saw much growth in Russia. Russian nobility wanted to be more 'Westernized,' and in their eyes, Russia was a 'backwards' state. Thus, to be Catholic was to embrace Western innovation and culture. By the time of the Revolution of 1917, there were two Latin-rite Catholic dioceses, one Eastern-rite Catholic exarchate, and 331 parishes on Russian territory.

One confirmed way which the Soviets attempted to gain influence & control in the Catholic Church was via infiltration. For example, some authors establish that the Soviets attempted to eliminate the subordination of local churches to the Vatican. When not attempting to destroy the Church in a particularly country altogether, some effort was made to create "national" churches. These churches would be self-governing, maintain the outward symbols of the original liturgy and practice, and instead have clergy which were either obedient to the state or agents of the state. The Soviets sent loyal agents to study at seminaries to learn how to perform the liturgy so that they could then install those clergymen in place of the validly ordained clergy.

One author described the Stalinist view of the Catholic Church this way:

The struggle against organized religion continued; it was especially vicious as far as Roman Catholicism was concerned, because it had ties beyond the limits of the Soviet sphere. Numerous members of the Catholic hierarchy were arrested and tried, including Cardinal Mindszenty in Hungary and Archbishop Beran in Czechoslovakia. The religious persecution survived even Stalin's demise; the Primate of Poland, Cardinal Stefan Wyszynski, was arrested in September 1953.

Thus, the attempt was to remove any "foreign" ties of the Church. In Romania in 1949, all Catholic bishops were arrested within the territory, along with priests, and congregations were dissolved. In Ukraine, instead of completely subduing the Church, Stalin conducted a forced integration of the Ukrainian Greek-Catholic Church with the Russian Orthodox Church, thus despite an official policy of state atheism, some attempt to use religion to control the population was made. In Lithuania, one of the first countries to fall under the Soviet rule, there was such a strong Catholic identity that it was not feasible to destroy it altogether. The Soviets instead kept one Catholic seminary open, infiltrated it with KGB agents, recruited seminarians, put mandatory pro-Soviet education in place, and attempted to use the Church to become a means of anti-religious policy.

== Propaganda ==
Examples of specifically anti-Catholic propaganda after 1917 frequently include anti-Western or anti-Imperialism tones. In the example on the left, a depiction of Western Imperialism is pushing along a Catholic priest, who is completely reshaping the landscape of a colonial/tribal location. Carrying packs which read "Religious Drug" (red canister) and "Choking Gas" (blue canister), and titled "Imperialism and Religion," this piece of propaganda has the following message: "The popes and missionaries are laying tracks for capitalism and imperialistic oppression in the colonies, with the help of the poison drug of religion." It was a common practice in Soviet propaganda to link Catholicism with capitalism and imperialism. For example, Gheorghe Gheorghiu-Dej, General Secretary of the Romanian Communist Party, at a meeting of the Romanian Grand National Assembly in 1948 portrayed the Vatican as leading the flock to the "golden calf" of America, a reference to greed, licentiousness, and corruption.

During World War II, the Soviets occupied the Baltic States, including Lithuania. The government revoked the Concordat of 1925 which had established official relations between the Holy See and Lithuania. Instead, the new Soviet Lithuanian constitution attempted to limit the continued spread of religion, particularly Catholicism. The constitution banned the proselytization of religious groups, allowed people to practice their existing religious rites, and promoted the spread of atheistic propaganda. While ostensibly permissive of religion compared to other Soviet states, in practice all religions, including Catholicism, were persecuted and repressed. The state institutionalized this suppression & propagation of atheistic principles through the creation of the Council for the Affairs of Religious Cults. Some efforts were institutionalized across the Soviet Union. For example, one publishing company started an atheist magazine, Nauka i Religiya, "Science and Religion." The first issue, which included articles on the origins of the universe and a report on contemporary Russian Orthodoxy, ran an article attacking Pope John XXIII.

Following World War II, the Soviets took over Catholic news sources, scholarly journals, and other means of communication to spread their message. For example, one author writes that once-Catholic theological journals would only sell copies within the Soviet Union, and were focused on converting Ukrainian Greek Catholics to Orthodoxy. In Romania, the strategy of the Communist leadership was to take a two-pronged approach to suppressing Catholicism. First, the leadership would deal with the official church hierarchy separately and without much media coverage.

Second, propaganda was sent directly to the Catholic faithful, bypassing the Church hierarchy in order to avoid stirring any nationalist sentiments. This was indicative of the view of the Church as a separate, foreign entity that had to be dealt separately from the congregations. For example, the forcible integration of the Greek Catholic Church with the Romanian Orthodox Church was portrayed as a type of religious liberation. Orthodox clergy entered Catholic churches and provided sermons giving praise to the Communist leaders for "uniting" the Christendom in Romania and that this would provide greater liberty and freedom. In an attempt to control the seminaries in Romania, the Orthodox hierarchy conducted conferences where anti-Vatican theological journals would be presented and discussed.

In 1967, in response to growing Catholic unrest, the Central Committee of the Communist Party of the Soviet Union passed measures which called for increased & intensified atheistic propaganda, including enhancing Scientific materialism training in the schools. In 1979, prior to the creation of the Polish Solidarity trade union, the Communist leadership in Poland grew concerned about domestic instability. The result was a "multi-faceted" campaign, which included propaganda, suppression of unapproved religious activity, and international mobilization. Internationally, under the guise of a peace movement, the Soviets attempted to label the Vatican and newly elected Pope John Paul II as belligerents against peace.

The attempts to quell the Catholic Church in Poland proved futile. While Communist leadership attempted to use the words of the Primate of Poland Stefan Wyszyński to fabricate a view of the Church hierarchy as supporting the cessation of struggles against Communism, the efforts only backfired. Polish media issued a headline the next day which read, 'Primate of Poland censored!' As in Lithuania and Romania, the Soviets attempted to promote division between the Catholic hierarchy & conservatives on one side and the leftist Catholics on the other. For example, the 'Znak' publication in Poland blended intellectuals and religious talk, promoting Catholicism and attacking Communism. On the other hand, The publication 'Neo-Znak' was set up as a splinter group to publish anti-Vatican or pro-Soviet Catholic materials.

In 1979, the KGB was given the task of publishing internationally articles capable of decreasing the international opinion of the Vatican. Similar to the censoring of Cardinal Wyszyński, where only parts of his ideas were expressed in official news sources, the Polish media broadcast widely any messages from Church hierarchy officials which could be construed to be instructing the people to submit to the Soviets. For example, following the declaration of Marshall Law in Poland in 1981, then archbishop – now cardinal – Józef Glemp, called for nonviolence in Poland. The media portrayed the message as a call for submission to the authorities.

Václav Havel wrote in 1987 of one instance where the state-controlled Polish media ran articles labeling priests as "practitioners of black magic who, with the assistance of the Devil, serves the black mass of anticommunism in the church of St. Stanislaw Kostka," and murdering the particularly anti-Soviet ones. Indeed, in 1984 priest Popiełuszko (later beatified) was murdered within an unauthorized Internal Security operation.

== Pope Pius XII ==
In 1949, Pius XII issued a decree prohibiting collaboration with communists. The Council for the Affairs of Religious Cults issued a response in the form of a published letter, which labelled the pope as a "warmonger."

=== Operation Seat 12 ===
Following the collapse of the Soviet Union, according to statements by former Soviet operatives, the alleged existence of a Soviet anti-Catholic propaganda operation came to light. "Operation Seat 12," named for the fact that Pius XII was the 12th pope named Pius, was an alleged Soviet plot following the death of the pontiff to frame the war-time pope as a Nazi sympathizer and a weak puppet. One allegation was that part of Operation Seat 12 involved the production of the 1963 play, The Deputy, which is a dramatization depicting the Pope in a negative light.

== Pope John Paul II ==
The 1978 election of Karol Józef Wojtyła as John Paul II as the first Polish pope in the history of the Catholic Church caused great alarm within the Soviet leadership. Following the election, the Politburo in Poland held an emergency session to discuss the election and the impact it could have on heavily Catholic Poland. On the one hand, the Soviets maintained an official policy of atheism and continued atheistic propaganda against the Catholic Church and religion in general. On the other, the predominantly Catholic population in Poland met the election of the Polish pope with such great jubilation that the Soviet leadership averted direct attacks against the Pope, even allowing him to visit Poland in 1979. The Kremlin was alarmed that the Polish government allowed the visit. Despite the visit, the Soviets took measures to reduce the impact of the visit where possible; sending constant status reports to the Kremlin and limiting media coverage. The first extensive critique of the pope to appear in the press was an article approved by Soviet leadership to run across the USSR between May and September 1980. The article was published by Iosif Grigulevich, now known to have been an illegal operative of the KGB serving as a diplomat, agent, and expert on Latin America and the Catholic Church. Grigulevich was known as an anti-Catholic voice in the USSR for his attacks on the broadcasts of Radio Vaticana as being "heated propaganda and destructive religious fanaticism." Further, when the pope issued requests to the faithful to commemorate through prayer the murders of Polish Catholics by the Soviet NKVD, the Soviets lumped the entire Church in with others taking part in "anti-Soviet action… with other hostile groups."

During the Pope's visit to Poland in 1979, the pope distanced himself from the breakaway Catholic groups, such as the 'Neo-Znak' publication, as he did not want to provide legitimacy to the groups which promoted Soviet goals & propaganda, according to one author. In response to the papal visit, a meeting of government religious affairs agencies met to discuss strategies and tactics aimed at reducing the influence of the Vatican and countering their activity. Part of the effort included mandatory "patriotic education" in Catholic seminaries to teach clergy about Soviet laws. Further, the Polish authorities held workshops with the media sources in the country to prepare them to respond to difficult questions about religious freedom that would arise domestically and internationally following the visit.

== Resistance ==
In Poland, Lech Wałęsa, Chairman of the Solidarity movement, and, after the fall of communism, President of Poland, summed up the contrasting Polish view of the Soviets and of Religion (specifically Catholicism) this way:

If you choose the example of what we Poles have in our pockets and in our shops, then… communism has done very little for us. But if you choose the example of what is in our souls, I answer that communism has done very much for us. In fact our souls contain exactly the opposite of what they wanted. They wanted us not to believe in God, and our churches are full. They wanted us to be materialistic and incapable of sacrifice. They wanted us to be afraid of the tanks, of the guns, and instead we don't fear them at all.

— Lech Wałęsa

Thus, it is clear that Polish nationalists linked their struggle against the Soviet Union with a struggle against atheism.

In Hungary, following the Hungarian Revolution of 1956, one of the first actions of the resistance was to retrieve imprisoned Cardinal József Mindszenty; a large crowd took him to the episcopal palace in the city, and his first free action was to celebrate mass in honour of the resistance.

In Czechoslovakia, the 1968 Prague Spring provided a renewed Catholic resistance to the Soviets and the Soviet-led Orthodox control of Catholic lands, churches, and institutes. This inspired Ukrainian Greek-Catholics to renew their efforts to achieve official recognition from the Soviets.

== See also ==
- Religion in the Soviet Union
- Soviet anti-religious legislation
- Persecution of Christians in Warsaw Pact countries
- Persecution of Christians in the Soviet Union
- Persecutions of the Catholic Church and Pius XII
- Eastern Catholic victims of Soviet persecutions
- Red Terror
- USSR anti-religious campaign (1917–1921)
- USSR anti-religious campaign (1921–1928)
- USSR anti-religious campaign (1928–1941)
- USSR anti-religious campaign (1958–1964)
- USSR anti-religious campaign (1970s–1990)
- Persecution of Muslims in the USSR
- Persecution of Jehovah's Witnesses in the Soviet Union
