= Council for Religious Affairs =

Former government council in the Soviet Union

The Council for Religious Affairs (Russian: Совет по делам религий) was a government council in the Soviet Union that dealt with religious activity in the country. It was founded in 1965 through the merger of the Council for the Affairs of the Russian Orthodox Church (CAROC) and the Council for the Affairs of Religious Cults. It ceased to exist after the dissolution of the Soviet Union.

== Background ==
The operations of the Council for Religious Affairs (CRA) became more apparent to scholars outside of the Soviet Union following glasnost and an opening of the Soviet archives. The CRA was a result of a renewed assault against religion, which started under the Khrushchev era, even though the CRA was not created until after his deposition. Letters from individual parishes express their frustration and alarm at a wave of new attacks starting in 1959, before the CRA was formed. Concerns came from both non-Orthodox and Orthodox figures, including Patriarch Alexy I of Moscow. The first head of the CRA, Vladimir A. Kuroyedov, was in fact the final head of the Council for the Affairs of the Russian Orthodox Church. He replaced Chairman Karpov and was seen as a much more anti-religious enthusiast who did not have reservations about attacking established religion. In the period of 1958-1964, when the CRA was officially created, Kuroyedov oversaw the dissolution of over 1,000 places of worship for non-Orthodox religious denominations, and over 6,000 Orthodox churches.

== Structure ==
The CRA statute organizes the council as being attached to the USSR Council of Ministers, but the Chairman of the CRA did not have ministerial rank. The chairman oversaw different divisions, which focused on particular religious groups, e.g. the Russian Orthodox Church, the Roman Catholic Church, Islam, Judaism, etc. The CRA has been described as a go-between for religious denominations and the Soviet state. It was tasked with overseeing execution of legislation pertaining to religious "cults." Officially, the CRA had "no part to play" in promoting atheism or serving as the means for the party's anti-religious campaigns; however, one author found during the time of the collapse of the Soviet Union, when the archives were generally more open than before, that there is evidence to the contrary. He cites an example of the CRA joining with another state agency, The Institute of Scientific Atheism, in combating the resurgence of Ukrainian Catholic activists.

== Activities ==
The CRA adopted and continued many of the activities of its predecessors. For example, By the 1960s, the CAROC had already been interfering in the administration of the Russian Orthodox Church, appointing priests and forbidding them from managing their own parishes. According to one source, archives show that the over 20 years of CRA activity show a vast interference in religious affairs, while not having the statutory authority to do so. Through these operations of the CRA, the Soviets were able to install clergymen who were compliant to the Soviet message and authority. Similar attempts were conducted in Baptist and Catholic parishes, with CRA authorities looking to impose "tame bishops" on the church. While the Holy See had the sole authority to appoint bishops, the CRA's Soviet Anti-Catholic Campaigns actively engaged in the creation of national churches to sequester local Catholic churches from the mother church in Rome.

In 1980, the CRA teamed with official media outlets, such as the Novosti press agency to "unmask the reactionary content of the political and social conceptions of the Vatican, papal encyclical and other programmatic Vatican documents with the subsequent aim of distributing these materials among the Soviet and foreign mass media. The CRA added a Catholic Department following the election of John Paul II to deal specifically with the "Catholic Question".

== Archival sources ==
The archives of the CRA are now available in the State Archive of the Russian Federation in Moscow (collection number Р-6991, inventory #6), the titles of the archival files are searchable through the online database.

== Heads ==
- Vladimir Kuroyedov (1960—1984)
- Konstantin Kharchev (1984—1989)
- Yuri Khristoradnov (1989—1991)

== See also ==
- Society of the Godless
- USSR anti-religious campaign (1970s–1990)
- Soviet anti-religious legislation
- State Administration for Religious Affairs (People's Republic of China)
