= Council for the Affairs of Religious Cults =

Soviet council

The Council for the Affairs of Religious Cults (Russian: Совет по делам религиозных культов) was a government council in the Soviet Union that dealt with religious activity in the country. It was established in May 1944. The council, established at the Council of People's Commissars (later Council of Ministers), was set up to oversee all religious confessions aside from the Russian Orthodox Church, which had its own council, the Council for the Affairs of the Russian Orthodox Church. It was also charged with the responsibility of managing relations with non-Christian religions and the Soviet state. For example, the Soviet Union had discontinued formal diplomatic relations with the Holy See following the installation of the Soviet Government. The council would have been responsible for responding to the actions of the Holy See, even when the USSR did not officially recognize the Holy See's statehood, and was instrumental in the Soviet campaign against various religious groups, including Catholicism.

The membership consisted of members from each Soviet territory and was headed by a chairman and was divided into divisions regarding particular denominations, for example Lutheranism, Roman Catholicism, and Islam. The council was combined with the Council for the Affairs of the Russian Orthodox Church in December 1965 to form the Council for Religious Affairs.

== Heads ==
- Konstantin Zaitsev (19 May-16 June 1944)
- Ivan Vasilyevich Polyansky (1944-1956)
- Aleksei Aleksandrovich Puzin (1957-1965)

== See also ==
- Society of the Godless
