= Religion in the Soviet Union =

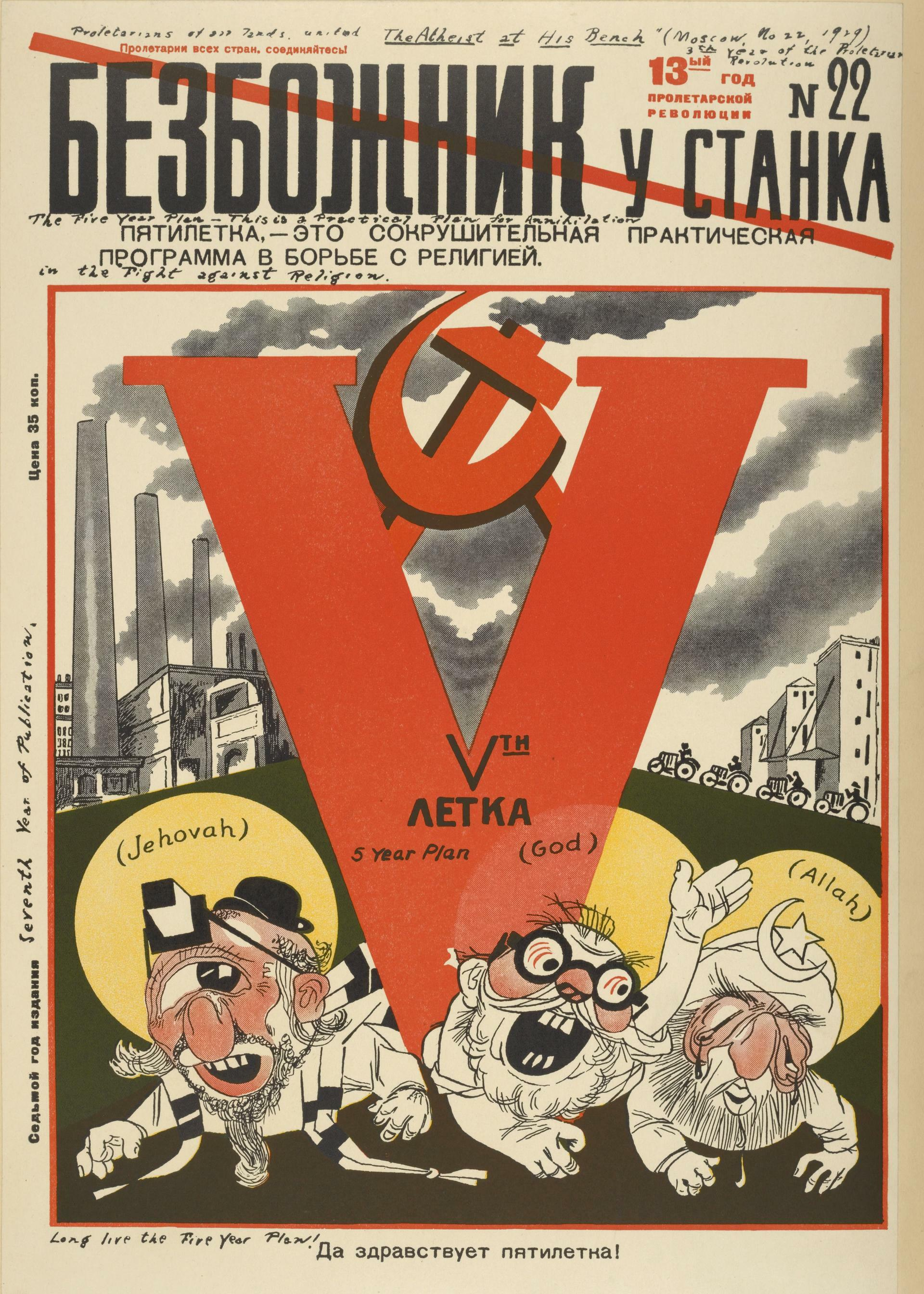
1929 cover of Bezbozhnik u Stanka, the antireligious magazine of the League of Militant Atheists. The Soviet Union's first five-year plan is shown to be crushing the gods of the Abrahamic religions (Judaism, Christianity, and Islam, respectively).

Religion in the Union of Soviet Socialist Republics (USSR) was dominated by the fact that it became the first state to have as one objective of its official ideology the elimination of existing religion, and the prevention of future implanting of religious belief, with the goal of establishing state atheism (gosateizm). However, the main religions of pre-revolutionary Russia persisted throughout the entire Soviet period and religion was never officially outlawed. Christians belonged to various denominations: Orthodox (which had the largest number of followers), Catholic, Baptist and various other Protestant denominations. The majority of the Muslims in the Soviet Union were Sunni, with the notable exception of Azerbaijan, which was majority Shia. Judaism also had many followers. Other religions, practised by a small number of believers, included Buddhism and Shamanism.

The vast majority of people in the Russian Empire were, at the time of the revolution, religious believers. After the October Revolution saw the Bolsheviks overthrow the Russian Provisional Government and establish the Russian Soviet Federative Socialist Republic (RSFSR), the communists aimed to break the power of all religious institutions and eventually replace religious belief with atheism. As part of the campaign, churches and other places of worship were systematically destroyed, and there was a "government-sponsored program of conversion to atheism" conducted by communists. "Science" was counterposed to "religious superstition" in the media and in academic writing. The communist government targeted religions based on state interests, and while most organised religions were never outlawed, religious property was confiscated, believers were harassed, and religion was ridiculed while atheism was propagated in schools. In 1925, the government founded the League of Militant Atheists to intensify the persecution.

== Marxism-Leninism and religion ==
As the founder of the Soviet state, Vladimir Lenin, put it:

Religion is the opium of the people—this dictum by Marx is the corner-stone of the whole Marxist outlook on religion. Marxism has always regarded all modern religions and churches, and each and every religious organisation, as instruments of bourgeois reaction that serve to defend exploitation and to befuddle the working class.

Marxist–Leninist atheism has consistently advocated the control, suppression, and elimination of religion. Within about a year of the revolution, the state expropriated all church property, including the churches themselves, and in the period from 1922 to 1926, 28 Russian Orthodox bishops and more than 1,200 priests were killed. Many more were persecuted. The Russian Orthodox Church also used its properties to aid the cause of the White Russians during this period, several closed churches were later reopened

== Christianity ==
=== Orthodox Christianity ===
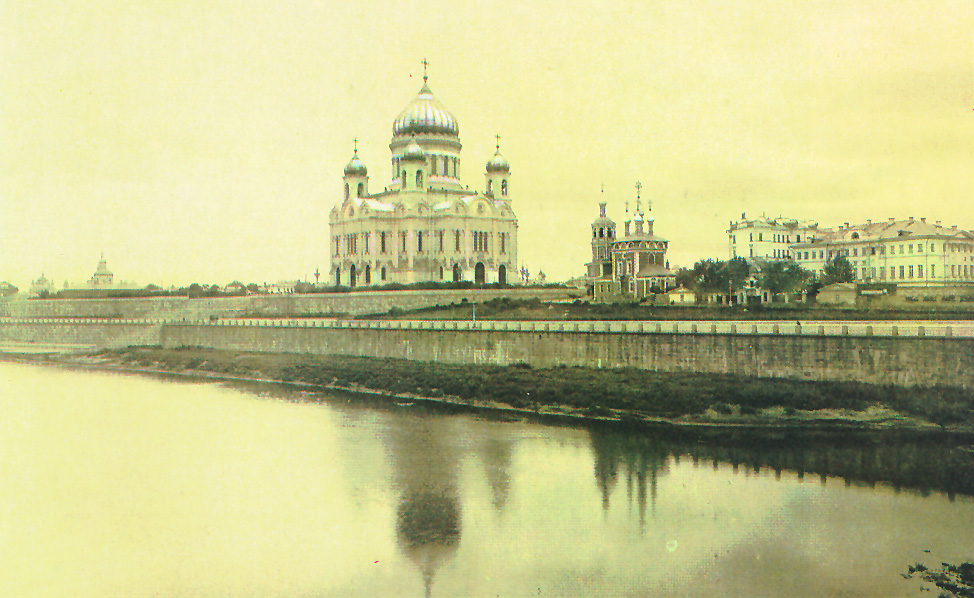
The Cathedral of Christ the Savior in Moscow was demolished by the Soviet authorities in 1931 to make way for the Palace of Soviets. The palace was never finished, and the cathedral was rebuilt in 2000.

Orthodox Christians constituted a majority of believers in the Soviet Union. In the late 1980s, three Orthodox churches claimed substantial memberships there: the Russian Orthodox Church, the Georgian Orthodox Church, and the Ukrainian Autocephalous Orthodox Church (AOC). They were members of the major confederation of Orthodox churches in the world, generally referred to as the Eastern Orthodox Church. The first two functioned openly and were tolerated by the state, but the Ukrainian AOC was not permitted to function openly. Parishes of the Belarusian Autocephalous Orthodox Church reappeared in Belarus only after the dissolution of the Soviet Union, but they did not receive recognition from the Belarusian Exarchate of the Russian Orthodox Church, which controls Belarusian eparchies.

==== Russian Orthodox Church ====
According to both Soviet and Western sources, in the late 1980s, the Russian Orthodox Church had over 50 million believers but only about 7,000 registered active churches. Over 4,000 of these churches were located in the Ukrainian Republic (almost half of them in western Ukraine). The distribution of the six monasteries and ten convents of the Russian Orthodox Church was equally disproportionate: only two of the monasteries were located in the Russian Soviet Federative Socialist Republic, with another two in Ukraine and one each in Belarus and Lithuania. Seven convents were located in Ukraine and one each in Moldova, Estonia, and Latvia.

==== Georgian Orthodox Church ====
The Georgian Orthodox Church, another autocephalous member of Eastern Orthodoxy, was headed by a Georgian patriarch. In the late 1980s it had 15 bishops, 180 priests, 200 parishes, and an estimated 2.5 million followers. In 1811, the Georgian Orthodox Church was incorporated into the Russian Orthodox Church, but it regained its independence in 1917, after the fall of the Tsar. Nevertheless, the Russian Orthodox Church did not officially recognise its independence until 1943.

==== Ukrainian Autocephalous Orthodox Church ====
The Ukrainian AOC separated from the Russian Orthodox Church in January 1919, when the short-lived Ukrainian state adopted a decree declaring autocephaly of the Ukrainian Orthodox Church. Its independence was reaffirmed by the Bolsheviks in the Ukrainian Republic, and by 1924 it had 30 bishops, almost 1,500 priests, nearly 1,100 parishes, and between 4 and 6 million members.

From its inception, the Ukrainian AOC faced the hostility of the Russian Orthodox Church in the Ukrainian Republic. In the late 1920s, Soviet authorities accused it of nationalist tendencies. In 1930 the government forced the church to reorganise as the "Ukrainian Orthodox Church", and few of its parishes survived until 1936. Nevertheless, the Ukrainian AOC continued to function outside the borders of the Soviet Union, and it was revived on Ukrainian territory under the German occupation during World War II. In the late 1980s, some of the Orthodox faithful in the Ukrainian Republic appealed to the Soviet government to reestablish the Ukrainian AOC.

==== Armenian Apostolic ====
The Armenian Apostolic Church is an independent Oriental Orthodox church. In the 1980s it had about 4 million adherents – almost the entire population of Armenia. It was permitted 6 bishops, between 50 and 100 priests, and between 20 and 30 churches, and it had one theological seminary and six monasteries.

=== Catholics ===
Catholics formed a substantial and active religious constituency in the Soviet Union. Their number increased dramatically with the annexation of territories of the Second Polish Republic in 1939 and the Baltic republics in 1940. Catholics in the Soviet Union were divided between those belonging to the Latin Church, which was recognised by the government, and those remaining loyal to the Greek Catholic Church, which was banned in 1946.

==== Latin Church ====
The majority of the 5.5 million Latin Catholics in the Soviet Union lived in the Lithuanian, Belarusian, and Latvian republics, with a sprinkling in the Moldavian, Ukrainian, and Russian republics. Following World War II, the most active Latin Catholic community in the Soviet Union was in the Lithuanian Republic, where the majority of people are Catholics. The Latin Church there was viewed as an institution that both fostered and defended Lithuanian national interests and values. From 1972 a Catholic underground publication, The Chronicle of the Catholic Church in Lithuania, supported not only Lithuanians' religious rights but also their national rights.

==== Greek Catholic Church ====
Western Ukraine, which included largely the historic region of Galicia, became part of the Soviet Union in 1939. Although Ukrainian, its population was never part of the Russian Empire, but was Eastern Catholic. After the Second World War, the Ukrainian Greek Catholic Church identified closely with the nationalist aspirations of the region, arousing the hostility of the Soviet government, which was in combat with Ukrainian Insurgency. In 1945, Soviet authorities arrested the church's Metropolitan Josyf Slipyj, nine bishops and hundreds of clergy and leading lay activists, and deported them to forced labor camps in Siberia and elsewhere. The nine bishops and many of the clergy died in prisons, concentration camps, internal exile, or soon after their release during the post-Stalin thaw, but after 18 years of imprisonment and persecution, Metropolitan Slipyj was released when Pope John XXIII intervened on his behalf. Slipyj went to Rome, where he received the title of Major Archbishop of Lviv, and became a cardinal in 1965.

In 1946, a synod was called in Lviv, where, despite being uncanonical in both Catholic and Orthodox understanding, the Union of Brest was annulled, and the Ukrainian Greek Catholic Church was officially annexed to the Russian Orthodox Church. St. George's Cathedral in Lviv became the throne of Russian Orthodox Archbishop Makariy.

For the clergy that joined the Russian Orthodox Church, the Soviet authorities refrained from the large-scale persecution seen elsewhere. In Lviv only one church was closed. In fact, the western dioceses of Lviv-Ternopil and Ivano-Frankivsk were the largest in the USSR. Canon law was also relaxed, allowing the clergy to shave their beards (a practice uncommon in Orthodoxy) and to conduct the liturgy in Ukrainian instead of Church Slavonic.

In 1989, the Ukrainian Greek Catholic Church was officially re-established after a catacomb period of more than 40 years. There followed conflicts between Orthodox and Catholic Christians regarding the ownership of church buildings, conflicts which continued into the 1990s, after the Independence of Ukraine.

=== Protestants ===
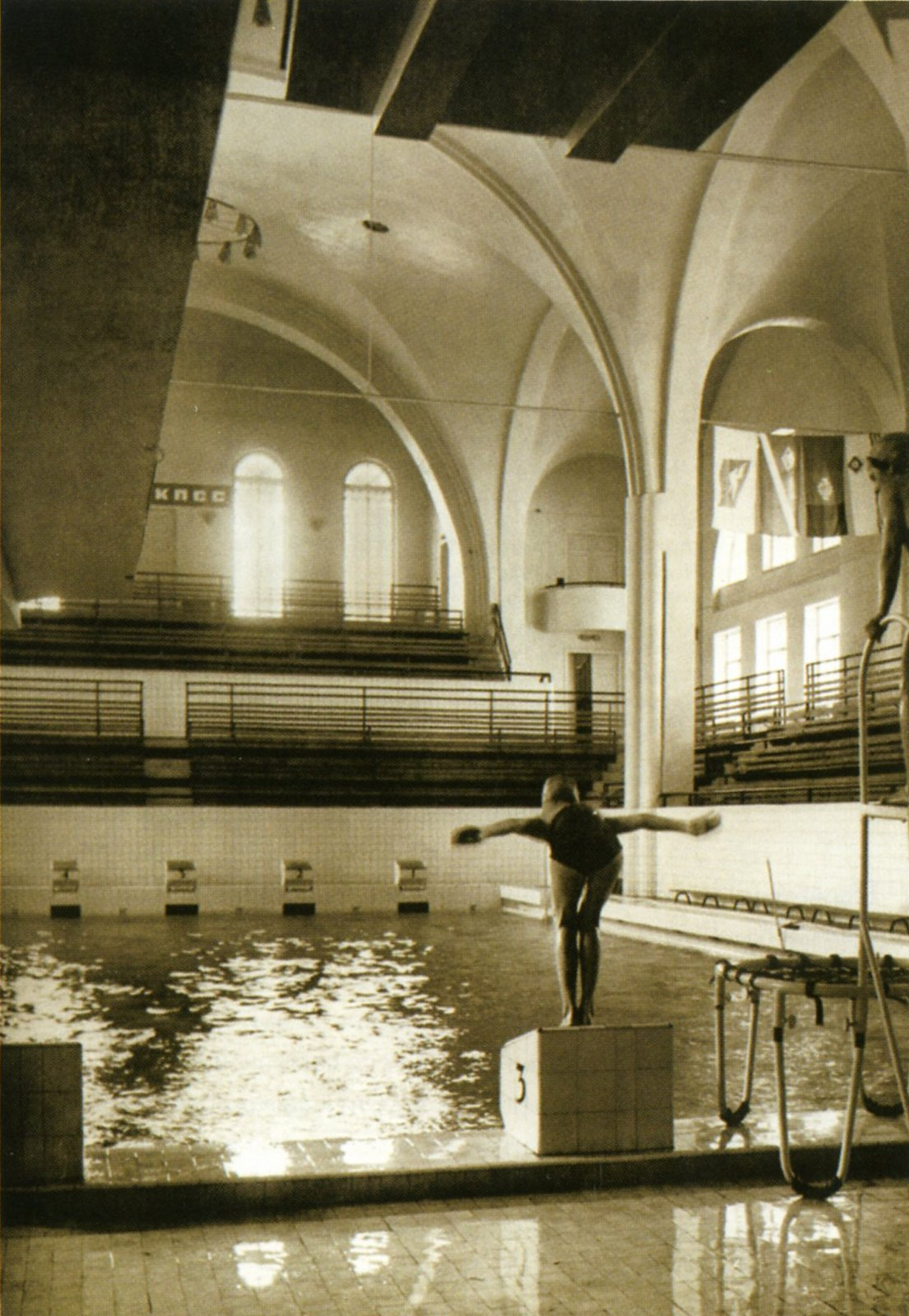
Lutheran Church of Saint Peter and Saint Paul in Leningrad used as a swimming pool after 1958.

Protestant communities (particularly Lutherans) first appeared in the Russian Empire in the 16th and 17th centuries in connection with expatriate communities from western Europe. In the 18th century, under Catherine II (the Great), large numbers of German settlers were invited to the Russian Empire, including Mennonites, Lutherans, Reformed and also Roman Catholics. From the 17th to the 19th centuries, various heresies (sektanty: sectarians) and spiritual Christian new religious movements emerged opposing the Russian Orthodox Church (including Molokans, Dukhobors, Khlysts, Pryguny and to some extent, Subbotniks, and in 19th century Tolstoyan rural communes), and their existence prepared the ground for Protestantism's future spread. The first Baptist communities within the Russian Empire arose in unrelated strains in three widely separated regions of the Russian Empire (Transcaucasia, Ukraine, and St. Petersburg) in the 1860s and 1870s. In the early twentieth century, Pentecostal groups also formed. In the very early years of Soviet power, the Bolsheviks focused their anti-religious efforts on the Russian Orthodox Church and it appeared to take a less hostile position towards the 'sectarians'. Already before Stalin's rise to power, the situation changed, however. And from the start of the 1930s, Protestants – like other religious groups – experienced the full force of Soviet repression. Churches were shut and religious leaders were arrested and convicted, often charged with anti-Soviet activity. One of the leaders of the Pentecostals movement, Ivan Voronaev, was sentenced to death in 1937, for example.

==== Baptists, Evangelical Christians, and Pentecostals ====
The Second World War saw a relaxation of church-state relations in the Soviet Union and the Protestant community benefited alongside their Russian Orthodox counterparts. In 1944, the All-Union Council of Evangelical Christians-Baptists was formed, bringing together the two main strands within Soviet Protestantism. Over the following two years, the leaders of the two main Pentecostal branches within the Soviet Union also agreed to join. The immediate post-war period saw the growth of Baptist and Pentecostal congregations and there was a religious revival in these years. Statistics provided by the leaders of the registered church suggest 250,000 baptised members in 1946 rising to 540,000 by 1958. In fact the influence of the Protestantism was much wider than these figures suggest: in addition to the existence of unregistered Baptist and Pentecostal groups, there were also thousands who attended worship without taking baptism. Many Baptist and Pentecostal congregations were in Ukraine. Women significantly outnumbered men in these congregations, though the pastors were male. By 1991, Ukraine had the second-largest Baptist community in the world, behind only the United States.

Although the Soviet state had established the All-Union Council of Evangelical Christians-Baptists in 1944, and encouraged congregations to register, this did not signal the end to the persecution of Christians. Many leaders and ordinary believers of different Protestant communities fell victims to the persecution by Communist government, including gulag imprisonment. Persecution was particularly vicious in the years 1948–53 and again in the early 1960s.

Despite the Soviet state's attempt to create a single, unified church movement, there were many divisions within the evangelical church. In the early 1960s, a break-away group formed a new movement which called for a spiritual awakening and greater independence from the Soviet state. Leaders of this group (eventually known as the Council of the Church of Evangelical Christians-Baptists) faced particular persecution. Pentecostals, too, formed their own underground organisation and were targeted by the state as a result.

The Evangelical Christians-Sabbatarians baptized by the Holy Spirit or Sabbatarian Pentecostals (particular denomination) and Evangelical Christian "Holy Zionists" (Pentecostal) were among the small religious movements persecuted by the authorities.

The Tallinn Revival was a religious movement in the former USSR that began in Tallinn in 1977, resulting from successful proselytizing by Charismatics among the congregation of the St. Olaf's Church.

==== Lutherans ====
Lutherans, the second-largest Protestant group in Russian Empire, lived for the most part in Finland and Latvian and Estonian Baltic regions, as well as German districts of Russia. The state's attitude toward Lutherans was generally benign. In 1924, the first General Synod of the Evangelical Church of the USSR took place in Moscow, adopting a series of reforms regarding church governance. However, by 1937, not a single Lutheran pastor remained in the USSR. The last parishes were closed in 1938–1939.

Following the establishment of Soviet rule in the Baltic states, many Lutheran pastors were forced to emigrate or deported, however, the Estonian Evangelical Lutheran Church and the Evangelical Lutheran Church of Latvia retained their legal status as a religious organization during the Soviet years (the Latvian Church were re-legalized in 1954). Unlike them, the Lutheran Church in different regions of the country was persecuted during the Soviet era, and church property was confiscated. In the late Soviet years, Lutheran churches in the Baltics finally began to settle themselves in the two republics.

==== Other Protestants and other Christians ====
A number of other Protestant groups were present, including Russian Mennonites, Seventh-day Adventists, Reformed, and others. Among other Christians groups: Innokentyevtsy, Jehovah's Witnesses, Yehowists, and Spiritual Christians.

The Irvingite community in St. Petersburg, which had existed since the 1860s, was liquidated by the authorities in the spring of 1933.

In the 1920s and 1930s, the center of the Church of God (Anderson, Indiana) mission—a Holiness movement which worked with Russian Germans—was relocated from Riga to Tbilisi. Following the deportation of Soviet Germans (1941–1942) to Kazakhstan, the Altai region, and Siberia, charismatic movements resembling Pentecostalism spread among the believers.

In 1952, at the suggestion of Brezhnev—then Secretary of the Communist Party of the Moldavian SSR—the USSR Minister of State Security Ignatov submitted a proposal to the CPSU Central Committee regarding the deportation of Jehovah's Witnesses, "as well as 400 families of Innokentyevtsy, Arkhangelisty, Sabbatarians [namely, Sabbatarian Pentecostals], Pentecostals, and Reform Adventists, totaling 1,100 people.". It was only in 1965 that the restrictions on special settlement were lifted.

Nearly 9,000 Jehovah's Witnesses were deported to Siberia in 1951; the numbers of those who were not deported is unknown. The number of Jehovah's Witnesses increased greatly over this period, with a KGB estimate of around 20,000 in 1968. Russian Mennonites began to emigrate from the Soviet Union in the face of increasing violence and persecution, state restrictions on freedom of religion, and biased allotments of communal farmland. They emigrated to Germany, Britain, the United States, parts of South America, and other regions.

The March 1961 instruction on religious cults explained for the first time, that "sects, the teaching and character of activities of which has anti-state and savagely extremist [изуверский] character: Jehovah's Witnesses, Pentecostals, Adventists-reformists" are not to be registered and were thus banned.

== Judaism ==
See history of the Jews in the Soviet Union.

== Islam ==
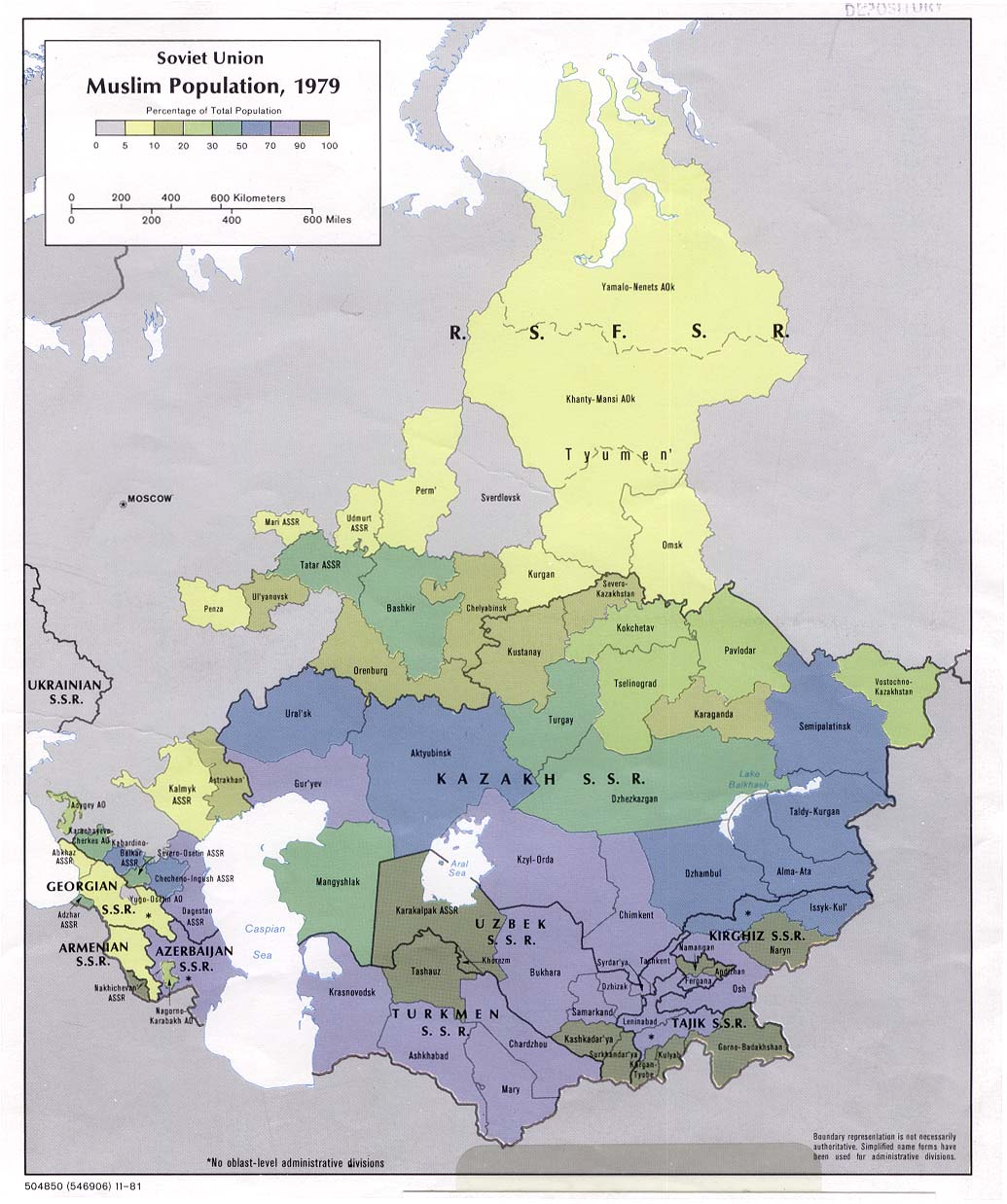
Map showing the distribution of Muslims within the Soviet Union in 1979 as a percentage of the population by administrative division.

After the Bolshevik revolution, Islam was for some time (until 1929) treated better than the Russian Orthodox Church, which Bolsheviks regarded as a center of the "reaction", and other religions. In the declaration "Ко всем трудящимся мусульманам России и Востока" (To All Working Muslims in Russia and the Orient) of November 1917, the Bolshevik government declared the freedom to exercise their religion and customs for Muslims "whose beliefs and customs had been suppressed by the Czars and the Russian oppressors."

During the World War II, the restrictions on religion were eased somewhat. In 1943 the Spiritual Administration of the Muslims of Central Asia and Kazakhstan was established. In 1949, 415 registered mosques functioned in the Soviet Union.

In the late 1980s, Islam had the second-largest following in the Soviet Union: between 45 and 50 million people identified themselves as Muslims. However, the Soviet Union had only about 500 working mosques, a fraction of the number in prerevolutionary Russia; further, Soviet law forbade Islamic religious activity outside working mosques and Islamic schools.

All working mosques, religious schools, and Islamic publications were supervised by four "spiritual directorates" established by Soviet authorities to provide government control. The Spiritual Directorate for Central Asia and Kazakhstan, the Spiritual Directorate for the European Soviet Union and Siberia, and the Spiritual Directorate for the Northern Caucasus and Dagestan oversaw the religious life of Sunni Muslims. The Spiritual Directorate for Transcaucasia dealt with both Sunni Muslims and Shia Muslims. The overwhelming majority of the Muslims were Sunnis.

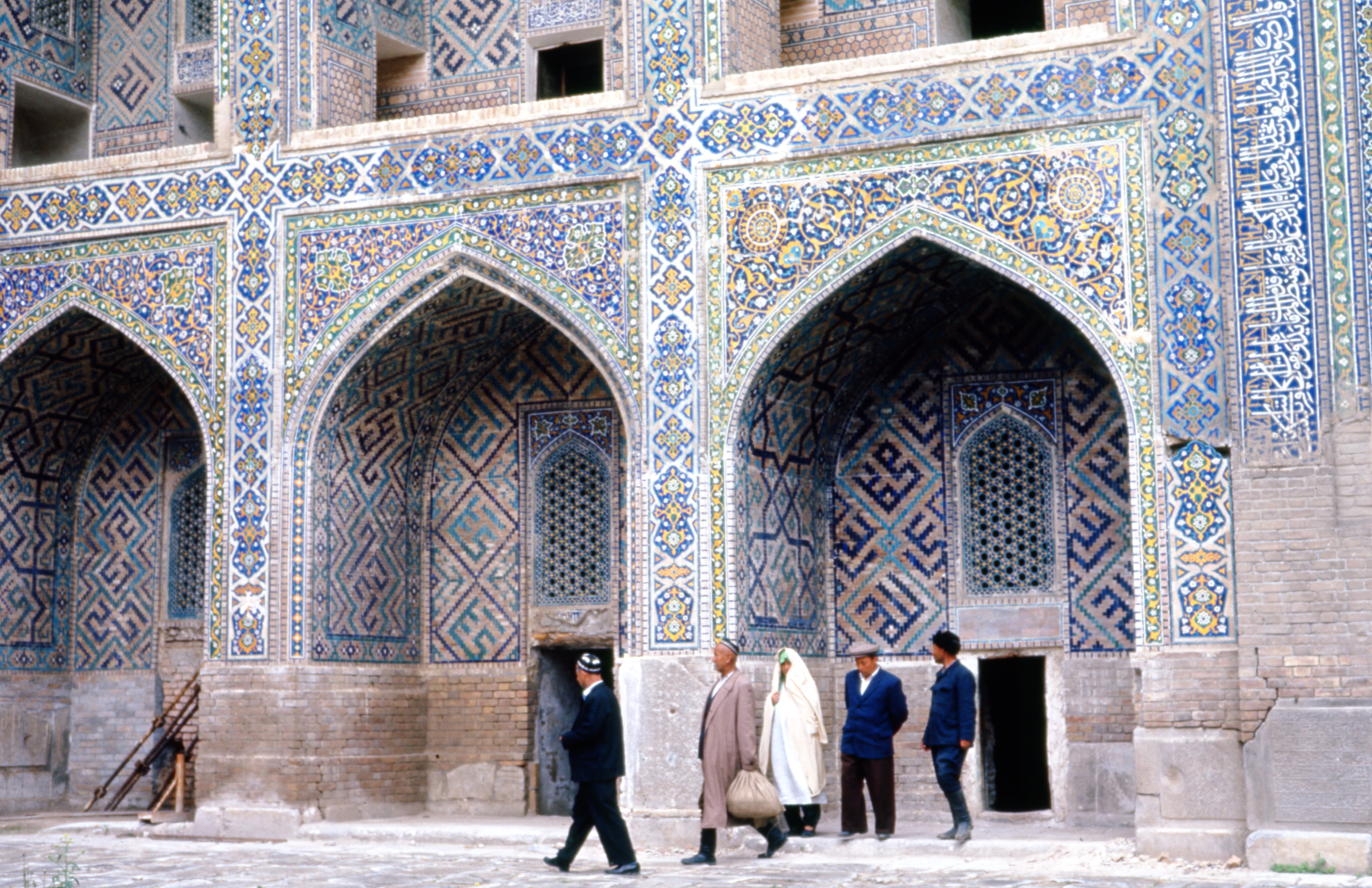
Group of people gathering in the Sher-Dor Madrasa, Samarkand, 1964.

Soviet Muslims differed linguistically and culturally from each other, speaking about fifteen Turkic languages, ten Iranian languages, and thirty Caucasian languages. Hence, communication between different Muslim groups was difficult. In 1989 Russian often served as a lingua franca among some educated Muslims.

Culturally, some Muslim groups had highly developed urban traditions, whereas others were recently nomadic. Some lived in industrialised environments, others in isolated mountainous regions. In sum, Muslims were not a homogeneous group with a common national identity and heritage, although they shared the same religion and the same country.

In the late 1980s, unofficial Muslim congregations, meeting in tea houses and private homes with their own mullahs, greatly outnumbered those in the officially sanctioned mosques. The unofficial mullahs were either self-taught or informally trained by other mullahs. In the late 1980s, unofficial Islam appeared to split into fundamentalist congregations and groups that emphasised Sufism.

== Religious belief systems founded in the Soviet Union ==
Porfiry Ivanov's teaching (Ivanovism) founded during 1930s and Daniil Andreyev's Rose of the World, a mystical work completed in 1958 are known among religious belief systems founded in the Soviet Union. In the late Soviet Perestroika years other doctrines and related new religious movements appeared, such as Peterburgian Vedism, Russian Authentism, Slavic-Hill Rodnovery, and White Brotherhood.

== Policy toward religions in practice ==
Soviet policy toward religion was based on the ideology of Marxism-Leninism, which made atheism the official doctrine of the Communist Party. However, "the Soviet law and administrative practice through most of the 1920s extended some tolerance to religion and forbade the arbitrary closing or destruction of some functioning churches", and each successive Soviet constitution granted freedom of belief.

Marxism-Leninism advocates the suppression and ultimately the disappearance of religious beliefs, considering them to be "unscientific" and "superstitious". In the 1920s and 1930s, such organisations as the League of the Militant Godless were active in anti-religious propaganda. Atheism was the norm in schools, communist organisations (such as the Young Pioneer Organization), and the media.

The state's efforts to eradicate religion in the Soviet Union, however, varied over the years with respect to particular religions and were affected by higher state interests. In 1923, a New York Times correspondent saw Christians observing Easter peacefully in Moscow despite violent anti-religious actions in previous years. Official policies and practices not only varied with time, but also differed in their application from one nationality to another and from one religion to another.

In 1929, with the onset of the Cultural Revolution in the Soviet Union and an upsurge of radical militancy in the Party and Komsomol, a powerful "hard line" in favor of mass closing of churches and arrests of priests became dominant and evidently won Stalin's approval. Secret "hard line" instructions were issued to local party organizations, but not published. When the anti-religious drive inflamed the anger of the rural population, not to mention that of the Pope and other Western church spokesmen, the state was able to back off from a policy that it had never publicly endorsed anyway.

Although all Soviet leaders had the same long-range goal of developing a cohesive Soviet people, they pursued different policies to achieve it. For the Soviet government, questions of nationality and religion were always closely linked. Therefore, their attitude toward religion also varied from a total ban on some religions to official support of others.

=== Policy towards nationalities and religion ===
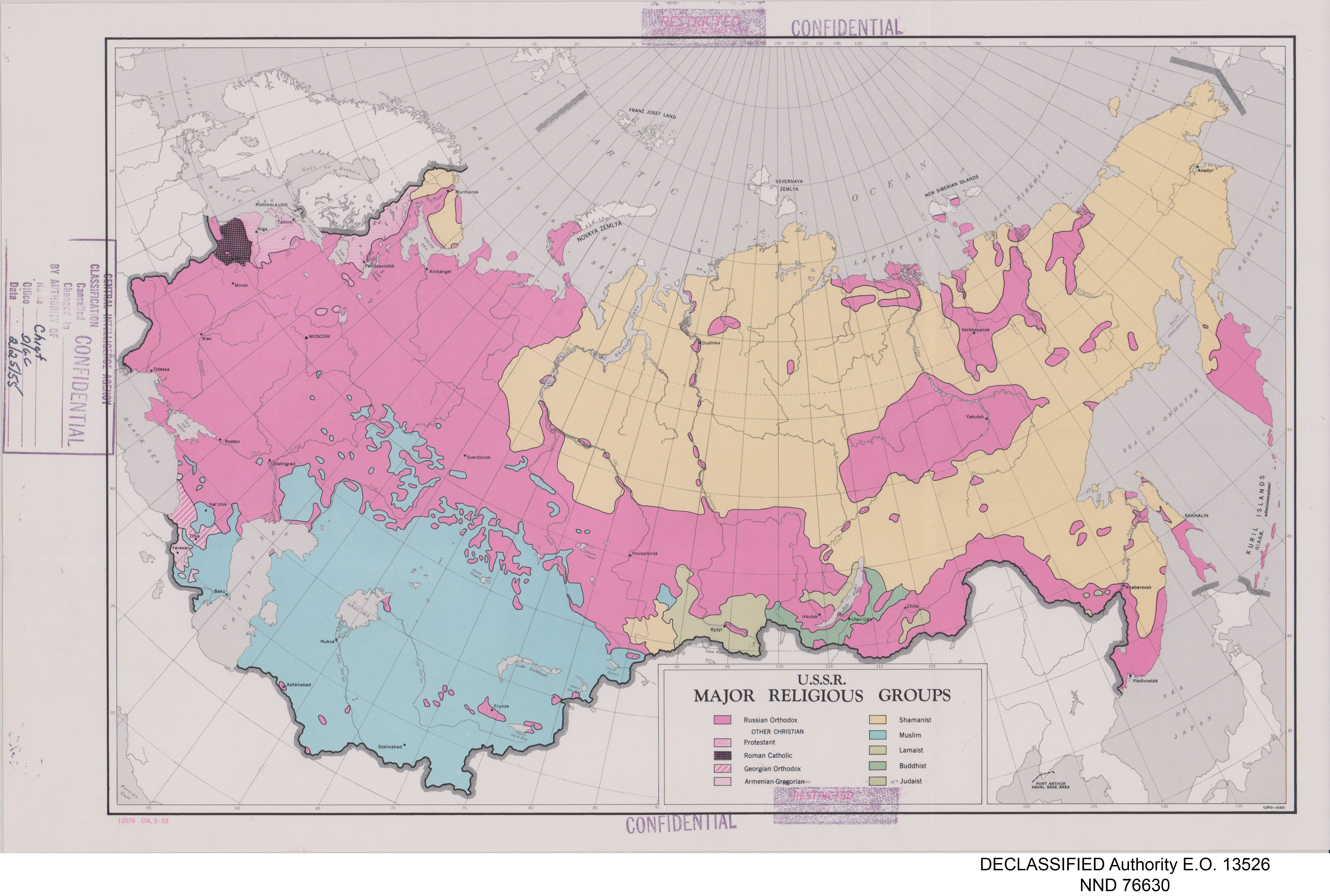
United States CIA map of religious groups in the Soviet Union, 1953

In theory, the Soviet Constitution described the state's position regarding nationalities and religions. (Note: Article 123 of the constitution stated that all citizens of the union had equal rights "irrespective of their nationality or race, in all spheres of economic, state, cultural, social, and political life.", while Article 124 allowed freedom of religion, including separation of church from school and state.) It stated that every Soviet citizen also had a particular nationality, and every Soviet passport carried these two entries. The constitution granted a large degree of local autonomy, but this autonomy was subordinated to central authority. In addition, because local and central administrative structures were often not clearly divided, local autonomy was further weakened. Although under the Constitution all nationalities were equal, in practice they were not treated so. Only fifteen nationalities had union republic status, which granted them, in principle, a number of rights, including the right to secede from the union.

Twenty-two nationalities lived in autonomous republics with a degree of local self-government and representation in the Council of Nationalities in the Supreme Soviet. Eighteen more nationalities had territorial enclaves (autonomous oblasts and autonomous okrugs) but had few powers of self-government. The remaining nationalities had no right of self-government at all. Joseph Stalin's 1913 definition of a nation as "a historically constituted and stable community of people formed on the basis of common language, territory, economic life, and psychological makeup revealed in a common culture" was retained by Soviet authorities throughout the 1980s. However, in granting nationalities union republic status, three additional factors were considered: a population of at least 1 million, territorial compactness, and location on the borders of the Soviet Union.

Although Lenin believed that eventually all nationalities would merge into one, he insisted that the Soviet Union be established as a federation of formally equal nations. In the 1920s, genuine cultural concessions were granted to the nationalities. Communist elites of various nationalities were permitted to flourish and to have considerable self-government. National cultures, religions, and languages were not merely tolerated but, in areas with Muslim populations, encouraged.

Demographic changes in the 1960s and 1970s whittled down the overall Russian majority, but they also caused two nationalities (the Kazakhs and Kirgiz) to become minorities in their own republics at the time of the 1979 census, and considerably reduced the majority of the titular nationalities in other republics. This situation led Leonid Brezhnev to declare at the 24th Communist Party Congress in 1971 that the process of creating a unified Soviet people had been completed, and proposals were made to abolish the federative system and replace it with a single state. In the 1970s, however, a broad movement of national dissent began to spread throughout the Soviet Union. It manifestated itself in a number of ways: Jews insisted on their right to emigrate to Israel; Crimean Tatars demanded to be allowed to return to Crimea; Lithuanians called for the restoration of the rights of the Catholic Church; and Helsinki Watch groups were established in the Georgian, Lithuanian, and Ukrainian republics. Petitions, literature, and occasional public demonstrations voiced public demands for the human rights of all nationalities. By the end of the 1970s, however, massive and concerted efforts by the KGB had largely suppressed the national dissent movement. Nevertheless, Brezhnev had learned his lesson. Proposals to dismantle the federative system were abandoned in favour of a policy of drawing the nationalities together more gradually.

Soviet officials identified religion closely with nationality. The implementation of policy toward a particular religion, therefore, depended on the state's perception of the bond between that religion and the nationality practicing it, the size of the religious community, the extent to which the religion accepted outside authority, and the nationality's willingness to subordinate itself to political authority. Thus the smaller the religious community and the more closely it identified with a particular nationality, the tighter were the state's policies, especially if the religion also recognised a foreign authority such as the pope.

=== Policy towards Orthodoxy ===
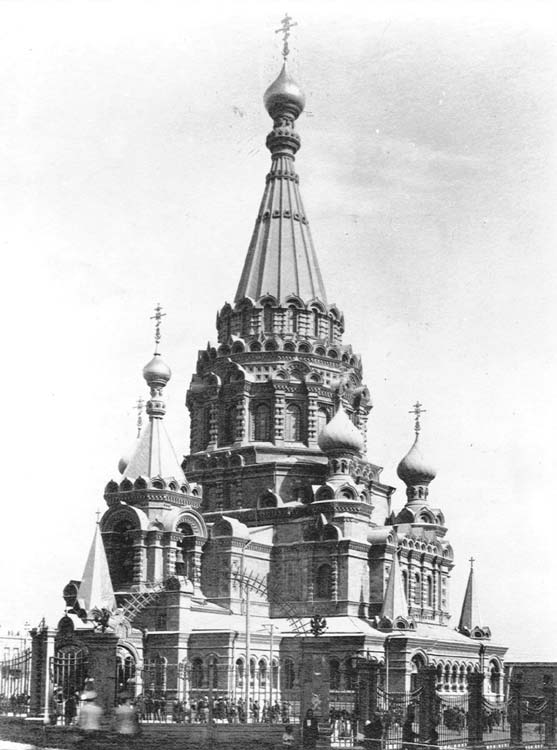
The Russian Orthodox Cathedral, once the most dominant landmark in Baku, was demolished in the 1930s under Stalin.

Soviet authorities both exploited the Church for state purposes and also moved to eliminate it. In the first five years of Soviet rule, 12 bishops and 1,215 priests were killed. Others were imprisoned or exiled. Almost all seminaries were closed, and most religious material was banned from publication. By 1941 only 500 churches remained open out of about 54,000 in existence prior to World War I.

Such crackdowns related to a number of people's dissatisfaction with the church in pre-revolutionary Russia. The close ties between the church and the state led to the perception of the church as corrupt and greedy by members of the intelligentsia. A number of peasants, while highly religious, also viewed the church unfavorably. Respect for religion did not extend to the local priests. The church owned a significant portion of Russia's land, and this was a bone of contention – land ownership was a big factor in the Russian Revolution of 1917.

The Nazi attack on the Soviet Union in 1941 induced Stalin to enlist the Russian Orthodox Church as an ally to arouse Russian patriotism against foreign aggression. Russian Orthodox religious life experienced a revival: thousands of churches were reopened; there were 22,000 by the time Nikita Khrushchev came to power. The state permitted religious publications, and church membership grew.

During the final years of Joseph Stalin's rule, there was once again a tightening of anti-religious measurements. In April 1948, Council for Religious Affairs sent out an instruction to its local commissioners to halt the registration of new religious communities and from that point churches were no longer opened. The "Knowledge Society", which was established a year earlier, was engaged in educational activities and again began to publish anti-religious literature.

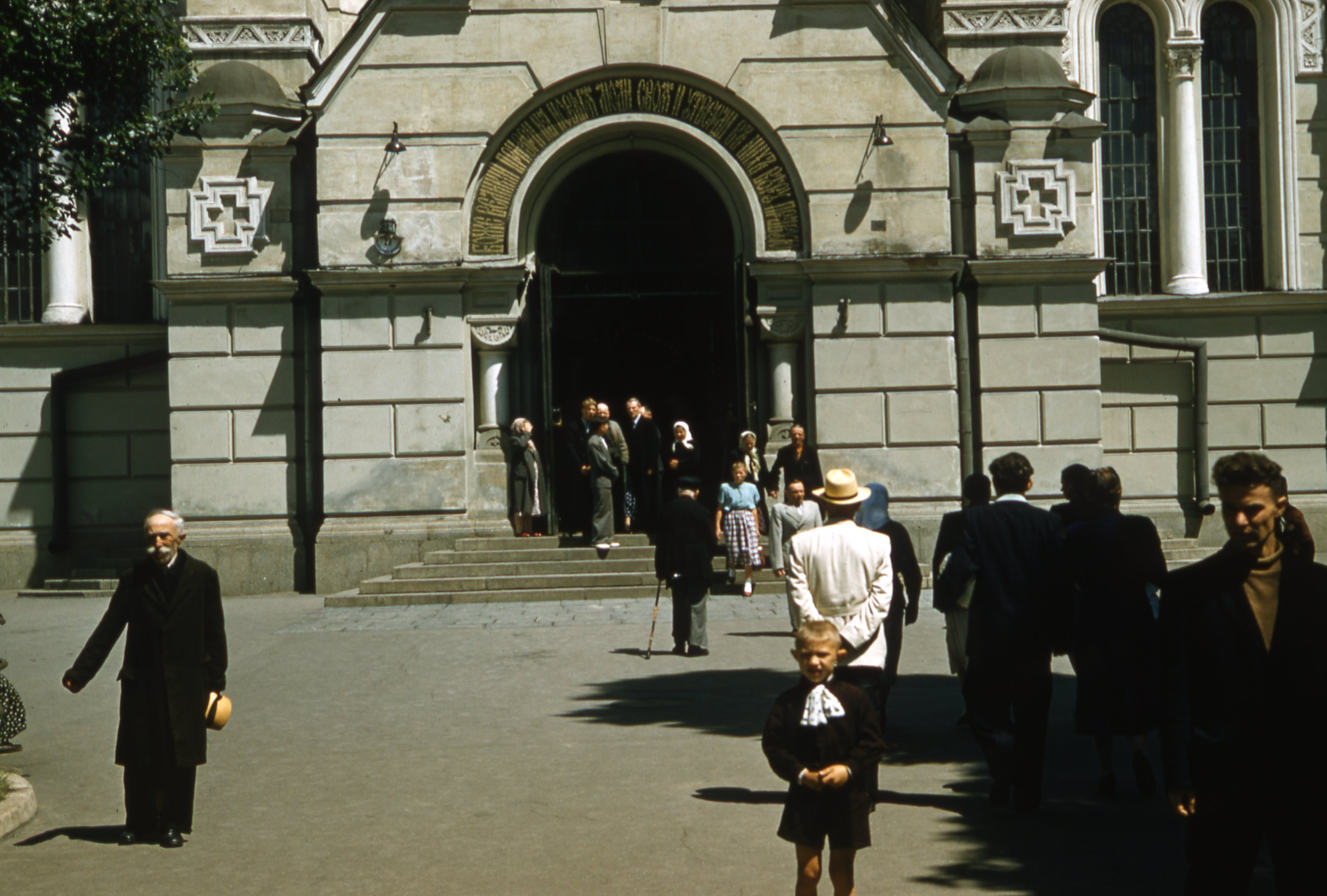
St Volodymyr's Cathedral, Kiev, 1958.

Khrushchev reversed the government's policy of cooperation with the Russian Orthodox Church. Although it remained officially sanctioned, in 1959 Khrushchev launched an antireligious campaign that was continued in a less stringent manner by his successor, Leonid Brezhnev. By 1975 the number of active Russian Orthodox churches was reduced to 7,000. Some of the most prominent members of the Russian Orthodox hierarchy and some activists were jailed or forced to leave the church. Their place was taken by docile clergy who were obedient to the state and who were sometimes infiltrated by KGB agents, making the Russian Orthodox Church useful to the government. It espoused and propagated Soviet foreign policy and furthered the russification of non-Russian Christians, such as Orthodox Ukrainians and Belarusians.

The state applied a different policy toward the Ukrainian Autocephalous Orthodox Church and the Belarusian Autocephalous Orthodox Church. Viewed by the government as nationalistic, both were suppressed, first at the end of the 1920s and again in 1944 after they had renewed themselves under German occupation. The leadership of both churches was decimated; large numbers of priests were shot or sent to labor camps, and members of their congregations were harassed and persecuted.

The Georgian Orthodox Church was subject to a somewhat different policy and fared far worse than the Russian Orthodox Church. During World War II, however, it was allowed greater autonomy in running its affairs in return for calling its members to support the war effort, although it did not achieve the kind of accommodation with the authorities that the Russian Orthodox Church had. The government reimposed tight control over it after the war. Out of some 2,100 churches in 1917, only 200 were still open in the 1980s, and it was forbidden to serve its adherents outside the Georgian Republic. In multiple cases, the government forced the Georgian Orthodox Church to conduct services in Old Church Slavonic instead of in the Georgian language.

=== Policy towards Catholicism and Protestantism ===
The Soviet government's policies toward the Catholic Church were strongly influenced by Soviet Catholics' recognition of an outside authority as head of their church. As a result of World War II, millions of Catholics (including Greco-Catholics) became Soviet citizens and were subjected to new repression. Also, in the three republics where most of the Catholics lived, the Lithuanian SSR, the Byelorussian SSR and the Ukrainian SSR, Catholicism and nationalism were closely linked. Although the Roman Catholic Church was tolerated in Lithuania, the clergy were imprisoned, multiple seminaries were closed, and police agents infiltrated the remainder. The anti-Catholic campaign in Lithuania abated after Stalin's death, but harsh measures against the church were resumed in 1957 and continued through the Brezhnev era.

Soviet policy was particularly harsh toward the Ukrainian Greek-Catholic Church. Ukrainian Greek-Catholics came under Soviet rule in 1939, when western Ukraine was incorporated into the Soviet Union as part of the Nazi-Soviet Nonaggression Pact. Although the Ukrainian Greek Catholic Church was permitted to function, it was almost immediately subjected to intense harassment. Retreating before the German army in 1941, Soviet authorities arrested large numbers of Ukrainian Greek Catholic priests, who were either killed or deported to Siberia. After the Red Army reoccupied western Ukraine in 1944, the Soviet state liquidated the Ukrainian Greek-Catholic Church by arresting its metropolitan, all of its bishops, hundreds of clergy, and the more active church members, killing some and sending the rest to labor camps. At the same time, Soviet authorities forced the remaining clergy to abrogate the union with Rome and subordinate themselves to the Russian Orthodox Church.

Before World War II, there were fewer Protestants in the Soviet Union than adherents of other faiths, but they showed remarkable growth since then. In 1944 the Soviet government established the All-Union Council of Evangelical Christian Baptists (now the Union of Evangelical Christians-Baptists of Russia) to gain some control over the various Protestant denominations. A number of congregations refused to join this body, however, and others that initially joined it subsequently left. All found that the state, through the council, was interfering in church life.

=== Policy toward other Christian groups ===
A number of congregations of Russian Mennonites, Jehovah's Witnesses, and other Christian groups faced varying levels of persecution under Soviet rule.

Jehovah's Witnesses were banned from practicing their religion. Under Operation North, the personal property of over 8,000 members was confiscated, and they (along with underage children) were exiled to Siberia from 1951 until repeal in 1965. All were asked to sign a declaration of resignation as a Jehovah's Witness in order to not be deported. There is no existing record of any having signed this declaration. While in Siberia, some men, women, and children were forced to work as lumberjacks for a fixed wage. Victims reported living conditions to be very poor. From 1951 to 1991, Jehovah's Witnesses within and outside Siberia were incarcerated – and then rearrested after serving their terms. Some were forced to work in concentration camps, others forcibly enrolled in Marxist reeducation programs. KGB officials infiltrated the Jehovah's Witnesses organisation in the Soviet Union, mostly to seek out hidden caches of theological literature. Soviet propaganda films depicted Jehovah's Witnesses as a cult, extremist, and engaging in mind control. Jehovah's Witnesses were legalised in the Soviet Union in 1991; victims were given social benefits equivalent to those of war veterans.

Early in the Bolshevik period, predominantly before the end of the Russian Civil War and the emergence of the Soviet Union, Russian Mennonite communities were harassed; several Mennonites were killed or imprisoned, and women were raped. Anarcho-Communist Nestor Makhno was responsible for most of the bloodshed, which caused the normally pacifist Mennonites to take up arms in defensive militia units. This marked the beginning of a mass exodus of Mennonites to Germany, the United States, and elsewhere. Mennonites were branded as kulaks by the Soviets. Their colonies' farms were collectivised under the Soviet Union's communal farming policy. Being predominantly German settlers, the Russian Mennonites in World War II saw the German forces invading Russia as liberators. A number of people were allowed passage to Germany as Volksdeutsche. Soviet officials began exiling Mennonite settlers in the eastern part of Russia to Siberia. After the war, the remaining Russian Mennonites were branded as Nazi conspirators and exiled to Kazakhstan and Siberia, sometimes being imprisoned or forced to work in concentration camps. In the 1990s the Russian government gave the Mennonites in Kazakhstan and Siberia the opportunity to emigrate.

=== Policy towards Islam ===
Soviet policy toward Islam was affected, on the one hand by the large Muslim population, its close ties to national cultures, and its tendency to accept Soviet authority, and on the other hand by its susceptibility to foreign influence. Although actively encouraging atheism, Soviet authorities permitted some limited religious activity in all the Muslim republics, under the auspices of the regional branches of the Spiritual Administration of the Muslims of Central Asia and Kazakhstan. Mosques functioned in most large cities of the Central Asian republics, the Caucasus, Tatarstan, Bashkortostan, Crimea, the Azerbaijan Republic, and elsewhere, but their number decreased from 25,000 in 1917 to 500 in the 1970s. Under Stalinist rule, Soviet authorities cracked down on Muslim clergy, closing multiple mosques or turning them into warehouses. In 1989, as part of the general relaxation of restrictions on religions, some additional Muslim religious associations were registered, and some of the mosques that had been closed by the government were returned to Muslim communities. The government also announced plans to permit the training of limited numbers of Muslim religious leaders in two- and five-year courses in Ufa and Baku, respectively.

=== Policy towards Judaism ===
Although Lenin publicly condemned antisemitism, the government was hostile toward Judaism from the beginning. In 1919 the Soviet authorities abolished Jewish community councils, which were traditionally responsible for maintaining synagogues. They created a special Jewish section of the party, whose tasks included propaganda against Jewish clergy and religion. To offset Jewish national and religious aspirations, and to reflect the Jewish national movement's role in the socialist movement of the Russian Empire (for example, Trotsky was first a member of the Jewish Bund, not the Social Democratic Labour Party), an alternative to the Land of Israel was established in 1934.

The Jewish Autonomous Oblast, created in 1928 by Stalin, with Birobidzhan in the Russian Far East as its administrative center, was to become a "Soviet Zion". Yiddish, rather than "reactionary" Hebrew, would be the national language, and proletarian socialist literature and arts would replace Judaism as the quintessence of its culture. Despite a massive domestic and international state propaganda campaign, the Jewish population there never reached 30% (as of 2003 it was only about 1.2%). The experiment ended in the mid-1930s, during Stalin's first campaign of purges. Jewish leaders were arrested and executed, and Yiddish schools were shut down. Further persecutions and purges followed.

The training of rabbis became impossible until the early 1940s, and until the late 1980s only one Yiddish periodical was published. Because of its identification with Zionism, Hebrew was taught only in schools for diplomats. Most of the 5,000 synagogues functioning prior to the Bolshevik Revolution were closed under Stalin, and others were closed under Khrushchev. The practice of Judaism became difficult, intensifying the desire of Jews to leave the Soviet Union.

== Religion in the Post-Soviet states ==
- Armenia
- Azerbaijan
- Belarus
- Estonia
- (Georgia (country)) Georgia
- Kazakhstan
- Kyrgyzstan
- Latvia
- Lithuania
- Moldova
- Russia
- Tajikistan
- Turkmenistan
- Ukraine
- Uzbekistan

== See also ==
- Hujum
- Council for Religious Affairs
- Central Spiritual Board of Buddhists of the USSR
- Culture of the Soviet Union
- Demographics of the Soviet Union
- State Atheism
- Soviet anti-religious legislation
- Soviet Anti-Catholic Campaigns
- Persecution of Christians in Warsaw Pact countries
- Persecution of Christians in the Soviet Union
- Persecutions of the Catholic Church and Pius XII
- USSR anti-religious campaign (1917–1921)
- USSR anti-religious campaign (1921–1928)
- USSR anti-religious campaign (1928–1941)
- USSR anti-religious campaign (1958–1964)
- USSR anti-religious campaign (1970s–1990)
- Eastern Catholic victims of Soviet persecutions
- Persecution of Muslims in the former USSR
- Persecution of Jehovah's Witnesses in the Soviet Union
- Soviet Orientalist studies in Islam
- Religion in Russia
- Bezbozhnik
- Enemy of the people
- Russification
- Sovietization
- Red Terror
