= Soviet anti-religious legislation =

The government of the Soviet Union followed an unofficial policy of state atheism, aiming to gradually eliminate religious belief within its borders. While it never officially made religion illegal, the state nevertheless made great efforts to reduce the prevalence of religious belief within society. To this end, at various times in its history it engaged in anti-religious persecutions of varying intensity and methodology. Believers were never officially attacked for being believers, but they were officially attacked for real or perceived political opposition to the state and to its policies. These attacks, however, in the broader ideological context, were meant to serve the ultimate goal of eliminating religion, and the perceived political opposition acted as a legal pretext to carry this out. Thus, although the Soviet Union was officially a secular state and guaranteed freedom of religion in its constitutions, in practice believers suffered discrimination and were widely attacked for promoting religion.

As part of its anti-religious campaigns, the Soviet state enacted a significant body of legislation that regulated and curtailed religious practices. This, along with many secret instructions that were not published, formed the legal basis for the Soviet state's anti-religious stance. Laws were designed in order to hurt and hamper religious activities, and the state often vigilantly watched religious believers for their breaking of these laws to justify arresting them. In some places, volunteer neighbourhood committees, called "public commissions for control over observance on the laws about religious cults", watched their religious neighbours and reported violations of the law to the appropriate authorities. The state sought to control religious bodies through such laws with the intention of making those bodies disappear. Often such laws incorporated many ambiguities that allowed for the state to abuse them in order to persecute believers.

This article lists and discusses some of the most important legislation below, although this list is by no means comprehensive.

== The Russian Civil War and the first anti-religious campaign (1917–1928) ==
=== Legislation that preceded Lenin's Decree on the Separation of Church and State ===
From November 1917 until Lenin's Decree on the separation of church and state in January 1918, legislative measures against religion were enacted. Among important Acts included:

i) Act of the Commissar of Education, 11 December 1917: ... It is declared that all control of educational matters shall be handed over to the Commissariat of Education from all religious organizations. All church/parish schools, teachers colleges, religious colleges and seminaries, ... all missionary schools, [and] all academies ... with all of their property, both movable and immovable, i.e. with all buildings ... land, with all gardens, with all libraries ... valuables, capital and vulnerable papers ... and with all that was credited to the above-mentioned schools and institutions, shall likewise be handed over to the Commissariat of Education. ... (Chairman of the Council of People's Commissars VI Lenin).

ii) Decree on the Dissolution of Marriage (Divorce), 18 December 1917: ... 12 ... All records currently in the possession of any religious organization are to be handed over to the local courts without delay. ... All decisions regarding the dissolution of marriage already made or in the process of being ruled upon by any religious organization or by any of its representatives, are hereby declared destroyed and not valid, they are to be decided upon by the local courts upon their taking possession of the appropriate records. Parties not wishing to wait until this takes place have the right to issue a new petition for the dissolution of their marriage as described by this decree. ... (Chairman of the Council of People's Commissars VI Lenin)

iii) Decree on Civic Marriages, on Children, and on the Introduction of Books or Records, 18 December 1917: The Russian Republic from now on recognizes only civil marriages. ... (Chairman of the Council of People's Commissars VI Lenin)

iv) Order of the People's Commissar of Military Affairs No. 39, 16 January 1918, On the prohibition of all powers of religious departments:

1. All religious ministers and practisers currently employed by war departments are discharged.
2. All powers of military clergy are dissolved.
3. War committees have the right to retain religious ministers, providing this is in accordance with the desires of their members.
4. In the above case the support of such a minister will be entirely up to the concerned committees.
5. All wealth and property of military churches, without exception, is to be handed over to the war committees of the units involved for safe-keeping.

v) Order of the People's Commissar of Welfare, 20 January 1918: The distribution of subsidies for the maintenance of churches, chapels, and for the operations of religious orders are to be halted. Governmental support of clergy and teachers of religion is to be halted as of 1 March of this year. ... Church services and the fulfillment of the needs of believers may be continued on the condition of an expressed desire by collectives of believers who must assume the full cost of repairs and maintenance of churches, [and] of all inventory and all servers. (People's Commissar A. Kollontai)

This meant that religious communities from then onward had to rely entirely upon the voluntary support of its laity in order to continue existence.

=== 1918 Legislation ===
Religion is one of the forms of spiritual oppression, lying everywhere on the masses of the people, who are oppressed by eternal work for others, need and isolation. The helplessness of the exploited classes in their struggle with the exploiters just as inevitably generates faith in a better life beyond the grave as the helplessness of the savage in his struggle with nature produces faith in gods, devils, miracles, etc. To him who works and is poor all his life religion teaches passivity and patience in earthly life, consoling him with the hope of a heavenly reward. To those who live on the labor of others religion teaches benevolence in earthly life, offering them a very cheap justification for all their exploiting existence and selling tickets to heavenly happiness at a reduced price. Religion is opium for the people.

— Vladimir Lenin in Thoughts of Lenin about Religion

Lenin's important 1918 Decree on the Separation of Church and State was followed by another body of legislation. Lenin's legislative acts would form what would be called the 'Leninist legality' and would be considered a milestone and a reference point for later anti-religious campaigns and thought. Among key legislation passed included:

i) Separation of the Church from the State and the Schools from the Church: Decree of the Soviet of People's Commissars, 12 January 1918:

1. The Church is separated from the State.
2. Within the territory of the Republic, it is forbidden to pass any local laws or regulations which would restrain or limit the freedom of conscience or which would grant special rights or privileges on the basis of the religious confession of citizens.
3. Every citizen may confess any religion or profess none at all. Every legal restriction connected with the profession of no faith is now revoked.
  Note: in all official documents every mention of a citizen's religious affiliation or nonaffiliation shall be removed.
4. The actions of the government or other organizations of public law may not be accompanied by any religious rites or ceremonies.
5. The free performance of religious rites is granted as long as it does not disturb public order or infringe upon the rights of citizens of the Soviet Republic. In such cases the local authorities are entitled to take the necessary measures to secure public order and safety.

According to Riho Altnurme, 'disturbing public order' was used as grounds to outlaw religions sects with 'extreme mysticism' such as Skoptsy, Hlysty, Pentecostals and Jehovah's Witnesses.

6. No one may refuse to carry out his citizen's duties on the grounds of his religious views.
7. Religious vows or oaths are abolished. In necessary situations a ceremonial promise will suffice.
8. The acts of civil status are registered exclusively by the civil authorities at the departments for the registration of marriages and births.
9. The school is separated from the church. The teaching of religious doctrines in all state and public schools, or in private educational institutions where general subjects are taught, is prohibited. Citizens may receive and give religious instructions privately.
10. All ecclesiastical and religious associations are subject to the same general regulations to private associations and unions, and shall not enjoy any benefits, nor any subsidies either from the Government, nor from any of its autonomous or self-governing institutions.
11. Religious organizations are prohibited from calling obligatory gatherings for its members, from establishing membership dues, and from disciplining any of its members in any way.

According to Gregory Freeze, church hierarchies and dioceses could not legally exist under Soviet law, and therefore if believers received instruction from priests or bishops as though such people were spiritual authorities, they could be punished along with the offending clergymen. In effect this made it extremely difficult for dioceses to be run except in a chaotic fashion; it also allowed for laity to assert increasing control over their churches and sometimes to have conflicts with the hierarchy as a result (and such conflicts were encouraged by the state).

12. No church or religious organizations are permitted to own property. They do not have the rights of a legal person.
13. Any and all property that any church or religious organization may in Russia is hereby declared to be public property. Buildings and objects required specifically for religious ceremonies, are to be given only by special decrees by either local or central governmental powers, for free use for the appropriate religious organization. (Chairman of the Council of People's Commissars, VI Lenin)

ii) Constitution of the Russian Federated Socialist Republic, 10 July 1918:

Article Two: General Provisions of the Constitution of the Russian Socialist Federated Soviet Republic. Chapter Five:

1. For the purpose of securing to the workers real freedom of conscience, the church is to be separated from the state and the school from the church, and the right of religious and anti-religious propaganda is accorded to every citizen.

This right to carry out religious propaganda was limited by censorship in 1918 up until the right was later removed. Church presses were confiscated and virtually all church periodicals were shut down; the hierarchy was denied much ability to influence lay opinion in the hope that this would sow discord and confusion in the church.

The Constitution was later modified in 1929, and the right of religious groupings to carry out religious propaganda was taken away, and it was made completely illegal to try to defend religion against atheist arguments or to engage in public discussion on religion. In its place the language read (Article 52) that all citizens had a right to "conduct religious worship or atheist propaganda".

Article Four: The Right to Vote. Chapter Thirteen:

65. The following persons enjoy neither the right to vote nor the right to be voted for, even though they belong to one of the categories enumerated above, namely:
66. (b) Persons who have an income without doing any work, such as interest from capital, receipts from property, etc.;
  (d) Monks and clergy of all denominations;

iii) Declaration of the People's Commissar of Education, 17 February 1918:

All teachers of religion of all religions are relieved of all of their duties and responsibilities as of 1 January 1918. (People's Commissar AV Lunacharsky)

iv) Declaration by the People's Commissar of Public Property, 14 January 1918:

The Court Clergy is abolished.

The protection of Court churches, as artistic and national monuments, is temporarily assigned to the Committees and Commissars of those places and institutions to which the churches are attached. If any religious society declares a desire to celebrate in those churches, then it will have to take upon itself the full cost of supporting the clergy, other religious servers and other associated costs ... (Deputy People's Commissar Iu. Flakeerman)

v) Declaration of the People's Commissar of Justice, 24 August 1918:

6. The minimum of local citizens required, in order to receive the use of religious property, shall be set by the local Soviet of Worker and Peasant Deputies, but this number may not be less than 20.

The fact that, this was a 'minimum' and there was no stated 'maximum', allowed for local authorities to set the minimum number at a high level.

8. Those who take upon themselves the use of a church building are obligated to: ... in the event of the revelation by the Soviet of Worker and Peasant Deputies of embezzlement or ill usage of lent property, immediately give up said property to the Soviet of Worker and Peasant Deputies upon their first demand. ...
10. All local citizens of the corresponding faith have the right to ... take part in the administration of the church property to the same degree as the founders of the association.

This allowed for local authorities to fill a religious building's administration with citizens and thereby take control of the parish or faith community, even to the extent of 'voluntarily' shutting down the building.

29. In government and all publicly administered buildings, it is, without exception, forbidden to:
30. a) hold religious functions or ceremonies (prayer services, funerals, etc.);
  b) house any sort of religious items (icons, pictures, statues of a religious nature, etc.).
31. Religious processions, and the carrying-out of any sort of religious functions outside, is allowed only with written permission from the local Soviet authority, which must be obtained for each separate occasion. ... (People's Commissar D. Kursky)

== USSR anti-religious campaign (1928–1941) ==
=== Laws on the Separation of Church and State from 1929 ===
i) Act #259 of the People's Commissar of Internal Affairs, 30 July 1929:

4. ... for former church/parish houses or former monastery buildings, if they are rented out to workers, they will be responsible for all repairs, and they must be charged rent equivalent to the devaluation of the property. This is to be considered as 1 per cent of the current construction cost for stone buildings, and 2 per cent for wooden buildings. For tenants living off non-labour income, including religious servers, the rent shall be determined as the cost of the devaluation of the property plus the interest upon the cost of the construction of the building, assumed to be up to 10 per cent per year, depending upon local condition and the situation of the tenant.

According to Dimitry Pospielovsky, this meant that religious minister could be charged from 5 to 10 times the rent that would be required from workers for the same property.

ii) Act of the All-Russian Central Administrative Committee and Soviet of People's Commissars RSFSR, 8 April 1929:

1. Persons living off non-labour income ... exceeding 3000 roubles per year, living in nationalized or municipally owned housing, cannot have their leases extended past the 1st of October 1929 ... they must be moved out without being offered alternative living space.
3. In all municipally owned or nationalized housing ... it is from now on forbidden to rent out space to those on non-labour incomes. It is also likewise forbidden to sublet, or take in as boarders those living on non-labour incomes.

Pospielovsky argued that a priest could not live with a parishioner or relative in government-owned housing.

iii) Decree of SNK RSFSR #23-24, 1929:

1. All cemeteries.. and all funeral organizations are hereby placed in the control of local Soviet deputies. (People's Commissar of Internal Affairs Tolmachev)

=== Laws Concerning the Taxation of Religious Cults and their Employees ===
High taxes on religious buildings and clergy were meant to cripple the religious bodies financially.

i) Circular NKF USSR #398, 10 September 1929:

1. Buildings, assigned for religious use ... and supplied free of charge for use to religious organizations, are subject to local taxes ...
4. ... nonpayment of taxes on time will result in the confiscation of the building.

(People's Commissar of Finance Briukhanov)

Rule #21/177

1. In those municipalities where there are municipal administrators, those citizens who are deprived of civic rights and thus cannot perform administrative functions are subject to a surtax. (those deprived of civic rights are defined in the constitution from 1918 above.)
4. ... The surtax shall not exceed 10 roubles ...

(Assistant Head of Taxation the RSFSR People's Commissariat of Finance Starobinsky)

=== Laws Concerning Civil Obligations ===
These come from the latter part of the 1920s.

i) Law on military obligations, 1 September 1928:

Section 1: ... The armed defence of the USSR shall be carried out only by the workers. Non-worker elements are charged with the fulfillment of other tasks for the defence of the USSR.

Section 236: Citizens, free from military service on religious ground ... are to be assigned to: in peacetime – public benefiting work (combating natural disasters, epidemics, etc.) ... and in wartime – special brigades for the servicing of the front and rear.

Local courts freed people from military service.

The Central Committee and the Soviet of People's Commissars of the USSR decrees:

1. Citizens assigned to home front service ... in peacetime are subject to a special military tax for the duration of their home front service designation.
2. ... the rate of tax shall be as follows: ... for those with an income up to 1800 roubles – the equivalent of 50 per cent of their income tax; with an income up to 3000 roubles – 75 per cent of their income tax; over 3000 roubles – 100 per cent of their income tax ... but the special tax shall not exceed 20 per cent of the person's taxable income.
5. The special military tax shall be collected for the first five-year period of one's home front service designation, and after this – for one year of every six years of home front service designation.

(Moscow, Kremlin, 10 April 1929)

ii) Instruction for the Fulfilment of [the above] Decree, 25 April 1929:

19. The maximum age for being designated for home front service is 40 ...

(Assistant Head of Taxation)

iii) Instruction on the Elections to the Soviets, Confirmed by the Presidium of the Central Committee, 4 November 1926:

15. Servers of cults of all religions and beliefs, including: monks, novices, deacons, psalmists, mullahs, rabbis, lamas, shamans, pastors ... and all those who fulfill similar functions, are denied voting privileges ... Family members of those whose voting privileges are suspended, and if the source of their income is social benefiting labour ...

iv) Act of the Central Committee and the Soviet of People's Commissars, 11 January 1928:

All Citizens of the USSR, who possess voting privileges ... may organize consumer organizations to serve their consumer and household needs ...

According to Pospielovsky, all clergy members (e.g. the people mentioned in the above list who had their voting rights deprived) could not form, participate or benefit from consumer organizations. This was very critical in some places of the country, since it was essential to be a member of such an organization in order to have access to any consumer goods.

v) Confirmation of the Central Committee, 15 December 1928:

... Those whose voting privileges have been suspended, have the last and lowest priority in land distribution for use ... Members of land organizations are considered all those who ... possess voting privileges ...

Pospielovsky argued that land organizations assigned land for all use. This meant that the clergy and non-voting members could not have a say in land allocation. This was a very harsh measure against rural clergy who often depended on small gardens and farms for their survival. If rural clergy did receive land from the land organization it was usually the worst land available, that no one else wanted.

A fairly large number of people wanted to refuse political rights to the priests lest they influence politics unduly. "The time has come to introduce universal suffrage without limitations," said Stalin, arguing that the Soviet people were now mature enough to know their own minds.

— Joseph Stalin as quoted by Anna Louise Strong in "Stalin: The Soviets Expected It"

In 1936, this unequal status was repealed by Article 124 of the new constitution, also known as the "Stalin" constitution, which redesigned the government of the Soviet Union. Article 124 restored equal political rights to clergy (allowing them to run for office as well) on grounds that not all clergy were hostile to the government and under the belief that the public ought to have been sufficiently 're-educated' by that point so as not to vote for people hostile to the Soviet Union.

vi) Act of the Soviet of People's Commissars of the USSR, 24 September 1929:

1. In all industries ... [and] in all institutions, that operate year-round ... the five-day work week (four days of work and one day of rest) is to be introduced ...

According to Pospielovsky, since only every seventh Sunday was a day of rest, this made it impossible to have regular Sunday church attendance. The celebration of holidays such as Christmas or Easter was also hampered by mandatory work on those days.

=== The Laws on Religious Associations (LRA) of 8 April 1929 ===
A new volume of anti-religious legislation was introduced in 1929 due to the failure of the anti-religious campaign in the previous decade and the church's successful resistance against atheistic propaganda. The legislation would form part of the basis for the harsh persecution that would be carried out in the 1930s. This 1929 legislation formed the main legal basis for the governing of religious activities in the USSR. It would be added to by the Instruction on the Supervision over the Fulfillment of Religious Cults in 1961 and the 1965 Statue of the Council for Religious Affairs (CRA). The 1929 laws would be amended later in 1975.

The 1929 legislation effectively curtailed the church's public presence and mostly limited religious activities to services conducted within religious buildings only.

3. A religious society is a local association of believers at least 18 years of age, belonging to the same religious cult, faith, orientation or sect, numbering no less than twenty persons, having come together for the joint satisfaction of their religious needs.

According to Christel Lane and the United States Department of State Bulletin of 1986, this meant that those under 18 years of age could not be part of a religion and therefore the law required that they be excluded from religious activities.

4. A religious society or group of believers may start its activities only after the registration of the society or group by the Committee on Religious Matters at the proper city or district (raion) Soviet.

According to Edward Derwinski, the state used this right to de-register religious groupings, thus making it illegal for them to continue worship, and this was used to gradually reduce the number of registered religious buildings (i.e. churches, synagogues, mosques, etc.) across the country.

5. In order to register a religious society at least 20 initiators must submit to the agencies mentioned in the previous Article an application in accordance with the form determined by the Permanent Committee for Religious Matters at the Council of Ministers.
6. In order to register a group of believers, the representative of the group (Art. 13) must submit an application to the agencies mentioned in Article 4 of the city or district where the group is located in accordance with the form determined by the Permanent Committee for Religious Matters at the Council of Ministers.
7. The registration agencies shall register the society or groups within one month, or inform the initiators of the denial of the registration.
8. The registration agencies shall be informed on the composition of the society, as well as on their executive and accounting bodies and on the clergy, within the period and in accordance with the forms determined by the Permanent Committee for Religious Matters at the Council of Ministers.
9. For the satisfaction of their religious needs, the believers who have formed a religious society may receive from the district or city Soviet, under a contract, free of charge, special prayer buildings and objects intended exclusively for the cult. Besides that the believers who have formed a religious society or group of believers may use for prayer meetings other premises left to them by private persons or local soviets on lease. Such premises shall be subject to all regulations provided for in the present law relating to prayer buildings; the contracts for the use of such premises shall be concluded by individual believers on their personal responsibility. Such premises shall be subject to technical and sanitary regulations. A religious society or group of believers may use only one prayer building or [complex of] premises.
10. Individual members of the executive organs of religious societies or representatives of groups of believers may make contractual agreements hiring persons to fulfil various jobs connected with guarding, repairing or procuring church property or material necessary for its preservation. [paraphrased] Such contracts may not include any commercial or industrial operations, even if related to the church, e.g. leasing of candle-producing plants or printing shops for the production of religious prayer books.
11. For each general assembly of a religious society or group of believers, permission shall be obtained: in cities from committees for religious matters of the city soviets, and in rural areas from the executive committees of the district.

Article 17 banned churches from being used for activities beyond worship, thereby outlawing parish libraries, organized religious education, prayer meetings for women and young people, religious study groups and sewing circles.

18. Teaching of any kind of the religious cult in schools, boarding schools, or preschool establishments maintained by the State, public institutions or private persons is prohibited. Such teaching may be given exclusively in religious courses created by the citizens of the USSR with the special permission of the Permanent Committee for Religious Matters at the Council of Ministers.
19. The clergy and other ministers of religion may operate only in the area of residence of members of the religious association by which they are employed and in the area of the temple where they serve. Clergymen regularly serving two or more religious associations may minister only in the areas of residence of the members of the given religious communities.

According to Jennifer Wynot, priests were forbidden from living in cities.

20. The religious societies and groups of believers may organize local, All-Russian or All-Union religious conventions or conferences by special permission issued separately for each case by:
21. a) the Permanent Committee for Religious Matters of the Council of Ministers if an All-Russian or All-Union convention or congress on the territory of the RSFSR is supposed to be convoked.

b) the local Committee for Religious Matters, if a local convention is supposed to be convoked. The permission for convocation of republican conventions and conferences shall be granted by the Committee for Religious Matters of the appropriate republic.

25. All the property necessary for the performance of the religious rite, both that contractually leased to the believers forming the religious society, and that newly acquired or donated for the use in religious cult, is a nationalized property and is listed in the files of the local government organs.
27. Prayer buildings and religious objects shall be leased to believers forming religious associations for use by the Committee for Religious Matters at the city or district soviet.
28. The temples and all the cult utensils within them are handed over for the use of believers forming the religious society, on conditions stated in the agreement concluded by the religious society with a representative of the local government.
29. The agreement must state that the persons taking over the building and its contents for religious use, pledge:
  a) to preserve and protect them as state property entrusted to them;
  b) to carry out all necessary repairs and to fulfill all financial obligations connected with the rental and use of the property e.g. for the heating, insurance, guarding, payment of taxes, special collections, etc.;
  c) to use all these properties only for the purpose of satisfying religious needs;
  d) to repay to the government the costs of any damaged or lost goods;
  e) to keep a register of all the belongings of the given temple, entering therein all additionally obtained (whether by purchase, personal donations, or receipt from other churches) objects of the religious rite... objects falling into disuse through wear and tear must be stricken out of the register informing the local government organ and receiving permission from the same to do so.
  f) official representatives of the local governments to be permitted by the parish executive to inspect the property and all its contents at all times except during the performance of the religious rite.
31. All local residents belonging to the same faith may add their names to those who have already signed the lease agreement, thereby obtaining equal right with the former in administering over the properties...
32. Every signatory may remove his/her signature at a later date, departing from the religious community. This however does not free him/her from the responsibility for the state of the property and its contents up to the moment of his/her resignation.
33. Prayer buildings shall be subject to compulsory fire insurance for the benefit of the appropriate local government at the expense of the persons who signed the contract. In case of fire, the insurance payment may be used for the reconstruction of the prayer building destroyed by fire, or upon decision of the appropriate local government for special and cultural needs of a given locality in full accordance with the Decree of 24 August 1925 on the Utilization of Insurance Payments Acquired for Prayer Buildings Destroyed by Fire.
34. If there are not persons who wish to use a prayer building for the satisfaction of religious needs under the conditions provided for in Articles 27–33, the city or district soviet puts up a notice of this fact on the doors of the prayer building.
36. The transfer of a prayer building leased for the use of believers for other purposes (liquidation of the prayer building) may take place only according to a decision of the Council of Ministers of the autonomous republic or oblast which must be supported by reasons, in a case where the building is needed for government or public purposes. The believers who formed the religious society shall be informed regarding such decision.
38. Lease agreements regarding... houses used for religious rites can be annulled ahead of time by court action.
39. Only the pre-CRA authority may close a temple by the request of the Council of Ministers of an autonomous republic, a province or a city (in the cases of Moscow and Leningrad) government.
40. Should a temple be closed, its contents are distributed thus:
  a) all goods made of precious metals and containing precious or semi-precious stones go to the local government financial organs or the Ministry of Culture;
  b) all objects of historical and special artistic value for the Ministry of Culture;
  c) other objects (icons, clergy vestments, etc.) having special significance for the performance of the rite are given to believers for transfer to other, active, places of worship of the same faith...;
  d)...
  e) money, incense, candles, oil, wine, wax, firewood and coal remain with the religious society, should the latter remain in existence after the closure of the temple.
41. Prayer buildings and wayside shrines subject to liquidation, which are registered in special local agencies for State funds, may be transferred for use free of charge to proper Executive Committees or city soviets under the condition that they will be continuously considered as nationalized property and their use for other purposes than stipulated may not take place without the consent of the Minister of Finance.
43. When the religious association does not observe the terms of the contract or orders of the Committee for Religious Matters (on registration, repair, etc.) the contract may be annulled. The contract may also be annulled upon the presentation of lower executive committees by the Council of Ministers of the autonomous republic, oblast, etc..
44. When the decision of the authorities mentioned in Article 43 is appealed to the Council of Ministers within two weeks, the prayer buildings and property may actually be taken from the believers only after the final decisions of the council.
45. The construction of a new prayer building may take place upon request of religious societies under the observance of the general regulations pertaining to construction and technical rules as well as the special conditions stipulated by the Permanent Committee for Religious Matters at the Council of Ministers.
46. Should the temple, owing to its age, become a hazard to the believers using it, the executive committee of the local government has the right to propose to the parish executive organ to discontinue the building's use for religious purposes until an inspection by a technical commission.
48. The technical inspection commission formed by the local government is to include a representative of the religious society in question.
49. The conclusion of the commission is final and its fulfilment is obligatory.
50. The commission's report is to state whether the building must be demolished or repaired. In the latter case the report is to detail the necessary repairs and the time needed for their conclusion.
51. In the case of the believers' refusal to carry out the required repairs, the agreement with the religious society on the lease of the property is nullified by the pre-CRA authority...
52. The pre-CRA authority also annuls the contract with the society if the commission concludes that the building must be wrecked.
54. The members of the groups of believers and religious societies may pool money in the prayer building or premises and outside it by voluntary collections and donations, but only among the members of the given religious association and only for the purpose of covering the expenses for the maintenance of prayer building or premises and religious property, and for the salary of the clergy and activities of the religious bodies.
57. Religious services take place in the temples without any express information to the effect of any local government organs. Local governments must be informed in advance, should a religious service take place in a building other than those officially assigned for such use.

This meant that they had to get advanced permission.

58. No religious rites may be performed in any state, public or co-operative institutions and enterprises. Neither may there be any religious symbols displayed in such buildings. This ban does not extend to special rites performed by request of a dying or gravely ill person, being in hospital or prison, if these rites are performed in special isolated rooms. Neither does the band extend to cemeteries and crematoria.
59. A special permission [granted] for each case separately by the Committee for Religious Matters is required for the performance of religious processions as well as the performance of religious rites in the open air. An application for such permission must be submitted at least two weeks prior to the ceremony. Such permission is not required for religious services connected with funerals.
60. No special permission is required for processions around the church as a part of the religious service, as long as they do not interfere with the traffic.
61. All other religious processions and all performances of religious rites outside the regular cult building require special permission of the local government in each particular case.
63. The registration agencies of religious associations (Art. 6) submit data to the Committee for Religious Matters at the city and district soviets in accordance with the forms and within the period established by the Permanent Committee for Religious Matters at the Council of Ministers.

Legislation passed in 1929 also forbade clergy or monastics from wearing religious garb in public. Islamic courts in Central Asia that interpreted Shariah were fully eliminated after this legislation in 1929.

== USSR anti-religious campaign (1958–1964) ==
=== Supervision of the Fulfillment of Legislation on Religious Cults of the USSR ===
This legislation, drafted in 1961 during the height of a renewal persecution under Nikita Khrushchev, was designed to assist the anti-religious campaign especially with regard to the massive number of church closures that were conducted. It gave the state tight control over religious practices.

Instruction on the Application of the Legislation on Religious Cults. Approved on 16 March 1961:

I General

1. [Right to believe]
2. Definition of a religious society. See LRA, Art. 3.
3. Believers forming a religious association [society or group] may:
  a) observe religious rites, organize worship meetings as required by the given cult;
  b) hire or elect clergymen and other personnel necessary for the observance of the cult;
  c) use a house for prayer and other cult utensils;
  d) collect voluntary donations within the temple for the support of the clergy, the prayer house, its property and the executive organs of religious associations.
4. On the open elections of the executive organs. The same as in the Laws on Religious Associations. See below.
5. The council on the Russian Orthodox Church Affairs (CROCA), the Council on Religious Cults (CRC), their local plenipotentiaries and local government organs must carry out strict supervision that the constitutional rights of believers and non-believers are observed, that no administrative methods are used in antireligious struggle, no administrative interference in the activities of a religious association, rudeness towards the clergy and insults of believers feelings.

II The Activities of the Clergy and the Religious Associations must correspond to the following demands

6. Free performance of religious rites is warranted as long as it does not disturb public order and is not accompanied by acts infringing on the rights of Soviet citizens. Otherwise, organs of national government may take any measures deemed necessary to restore public order and security.
7. Religious associations and clergy may not:
  a) use religious services for political pronouncements, contradicting the interests of Soviet society;
  b) urge the believers to abstain from fulfilling their citizens' duties;
  c) carry on propaganda aimed at tearing the believers away from active participation in the state, and the cultural and socio-political life of the country;
  d) perform religious rites and ceremonies in the state, public and cooperative institutions and enterprises

An exception was made for the sick and dying.

7. Religious associations and the clergy may not engage in any activities, except those aimed at satisfying believers' needs.
8. Meeting and processions. Same as in LRA.
9. Religious centres, religious associations and the clergy may not:
  a) organize special groups, etc. – as in LRA below;
  b) organize pilgrimages to the so-called 'holy places', perform fraudulent actions aimed at raising superstitions in the masses of population in order to derive some kind of benefits (declaration of all sorts of miracles, e.g. curing of illness, prophecies, etc.);
  c) make any compulsory collections or imposing dues on believers for the support of religious associations or other purposes;
  d) apply any forms of compulsion of punishment to believers.
10. Religious centres, diocesan administrations and other religious organs are forbidden to:
  a) use their resources and funds for charity or for the support of churches and monasteries, not supported by the population as it drifts away from religion, or for any other needs except for the covering of expenses required for the sustenance of the organs themselves;
  b) convoke religious congresses and councils, establish theological schools, publish religious literature, without the express permission each time of the Council in Religious Cults or the Council for the Russian Orthodox Church Affairs.
12. (& 13). Technicalities, repeated in LRA (CRA's inspections, etc.).

III. Supervision over the fulfilment of the Legislation on Cults

14. Technical.
15. On the discovery of breaches of the Legislation on Cults in the activities of a religious association or a clergyman, state of organs and official of the CROCA/CRC musk ask the said clergyman or religious association's executive organ to remove the breaches by a certain date. Should the said bodies discontinue to disregard the rules and refuse to do otherwise, the said government organs must raise the question of depriving the clergyman or the religious association of registration... and, in special circumstances, bring the guilty ones to justice.
16. Technical: on keeping registers, listing and reporting...
17. On the duty of local CROC/CRC officials to inform the central offices on all details of local religious life, breaches of legislation by the church organs, etc.

IV. Order and Procedures regarding Registration of Religious Associations, Opening and Closing of Prayer Houses

18. No religious association may begin its functioning without first registering with the organs of the state government.
19. Technicalities of the procedure. Basically the same as in LRA
20. The executive committee of the local government addresses the believers' petition with its resolution attached to the provincial government or to the Council of Ministers of the given autonomous republic, adding to it all the necessary information as established by the CROCA/CRC.
21. On the instruction of the provincial government... the local official of the CROCA/CRC reviews the believers' petition and checks its soundness.
22. The Provincial Government or Council of Ministers of an autonomous republic makes the decision to register or not to register the petitioners as a religious association.
23. Religious societies and groups of believers belonging to the sects the teaching and character of activities whereof is of an anti-state and fanatical nature, may not be registered. To these belong: The Jehovah's Witnesses, Pentecostals, the True Orthodox Christians, the True Orthodox Church, the Adventist-Reformists, Murashkovites, etc. (The Ukrainian Catholic rite was also outlawed.)
24. Religious associations may be deprived of registration in cases of breaking the Soviet legislation on religious cults. The Procedure is the same as in the LRA below, except that the registration is revoked by local government rather than by the CRA or its predecessors.
25. Prayer houses may be closed in the following cases:
  a) if the religious association using it has been deprived of registration;
  b) if the building has to be demolished owing to the reconstruction of the area or owing to the dilapidated state of the building as confirmed by a technical inspection document and co-ordinated with the local official of the CROCA/CRC.
26. No Eastern Orthodox, Old Believers, Armenian-Gregorian, Roman Catholic, Lutheran churches, Muslim mosques, Jewish synagogues, sectarian places of worship, Buddhist temples, actively in use by their religious societies may be closed without the express permission of the provincial government or Council of Ministers of an autonomous republic, co-ordinated with the central CROCA/CRC.
27. Registration and de-registration of clergy. The same as in LRA.
28. Provincial governments and their equivalents may order a limitation on tolling church bells, should this become necessary and be supported by the local population.

V. Rules on the Use of Objects (Utensils) of the Cult Basically the same as in LRA. A lesser role is given to the CROCA/CRC; a greater to local governments.

CROCA and CRC were amalgamated in 1965 to form the Council for Religious Affairs (CRA). CROCA and CRC were originally created by Joseph Stalin during the second world war (1939–1945) as liaison bodies between religion and the government. Under Nikita Khrushchev this function began to evolve into dictatorial bodies that exerted control over religious activities in the country. Articles 24–26 were ambiguous enough, that in practice they could be effectively used in order to close churches on a wide scale, as occurred under Khrushchev. The meagre protection that they offered (such as in article 26) were eliminated in 1975.

Articles 6, 7, 10 and 11 could also be used. Choral singing, processions, church bells and other normal functions of churches could be interpreted as 'disturbing public order' and prohibited.

Article 7a–c could be used by the state, which could apply it to any homily or sermon it didn't like. For example, Bishop Khrizostom of Kursk criticized 'scientific atheism' and claimed that science also needed faith as a motivation for its development, and as a result the bishop lost his position in the Department of External Ecclesiastical Relations and was moved to the Urals in 1984. Monks who preached about concentrating on the spiritual life and disregarding the temptations of the material world could be interpreted as 'propaganda aimed at tearing believers away from active participation in the state'. Fr Amvrossi was harassed and expelled twice in 1976 as a result of such homilies. Before this legislation had taken effect, believers who preached against atheism could be arrested for making 'political' sermons that were interpreted as an attack on state ideology.

Article 10b in practice forbade priests from organizing pilgrimages, and from making claims of the miraculous. Priests were de-registered and even imprisoned for telling their parishioners about miracles. For example, Fr Sergi Zheludkov lost his registration in the 1960s for taking some of his parishioners to see supposed miraculous icon renewals (where an icon that is dark and covered with soot suddenly begin to shine again as though new).

Article 11, made it such that it was not the Church that decided to have a church council or how many theological colleges were needed for its spiritual needs but rather it was the government that decided.

Legislation in this year also gave the state control of financial activities of religious institutions and legally separated priests from control of parishes. A further law in 1962 gave the state control of all baptisms, marriages, burial services and other religious rites.

=== Provisions on the Council for Religious Affairs ===
In 1965 the Council for Religious Affairs (CRA) of the Council of Ministers was created from the amalgamation of CROCA and CRC. This organization inherited the role of dictatorial control over religious life in the country and it used whatever means it could in order to disrupt or put down religious activities. Its legal mandate was strengthened in the 1975 amendments to the LRA, although many of the powers that it would be officially given were things that it had already effectively been using (from its predecessors) since Nikita Khrushchev.

1. The CRA... has been formed for the implementation of the policies of the Soviet Government regarding religions.
2. The main functions of the CRA are:
  a) to make sure that the constitutional and all other legal provisions regarding Church-State relations are observed;
  b) to study and draw conclusions regarding the practice of the laws on religious cults, to draft new laws and decrees in this sphere...;
  c) to inform the Soviet Government on the activities of religious organizations;
  d) to help religious organizations in making international contacts, in participating in the struggle for peace and strengthening friendship between nations.
3. The CRA's duties include:
  a) assuring the realization of the constitutional right of Soviet citizens to profess a religion or not to profess any;
  b) supervision over the correct fulfillment of the laws on religion by religious organization and clergy;
  c) liaison functions between the religious organization and the Soviet Government on questions needing a governmental decision;
  d) keeping a register of all religious associations prayer houses and buildings;
  e) study and decision-making regarding questions arising out of activities of religious organizations in the USSR;
  f) checking the application of the laws on religion by central and local organizations;
  g) issuing resolutions on the union republican draft laws relating to religion;
  h) receipt of information and materials on religion from the central and local government organs.
4. The CRA has the right to:
  a) make decisions on the registration or de-registration of religious associations, on the opening and closing of temples and prayer houses;
  b) check the activities of religious organizations in regard to their observance of Soviet laws on religion; its orders to discontinue any abuses of the laws must be met without fail;
  c) raise the question of initiating penal administrative or criminal procedure against those in breach of the laws on religion
  d) clarify questions relating to the laws on religion to central and local government organs and other Soviet organizations;
  e) suggest to local and higher administrative organs abolition of instructions that contradict Soviet laws on religion.
5. Structure and staffing of the CRA
6. The CRA of the Soviet Council of Ministers at its meetings studies questions related to the practical application of the Soviet religious policies... makes decisions on the registration and de-registration of religious temples and prayer houses ... [and regarding all the other issues enumerated in article 1-5]
7. The CRA has its plenipotentiary officials in each union and autonomous republic and in every province, subordinate to the central CRA.
8. The local CRA official is responsible for all the actions on the local level, stipulated in the above articles. Has the same controlling powers over local church organizations and bishops as, in principle, the central CRA Office has over the whole Church. He also informs the CRA central office on all details of life and activities of local churches and clergy.
9. More details of the kind enumerated under No. 9
10. (& 12). Additional details on the relationship between the local CRA and local governments, and on the CRA stamp.

Adopted on 8 December 1965, confirmed on 10 May 1966

== USSR anti-religious campaign (1970s–1990) ==
=== 23 June 1975, Amendments to 1929 Laws on Religious Associations ===
The 1929 legislation on religious associations was amended in 1975. The most prominent difference was the status of the Council for Religious Affairs (created in 1965), which was given effective legal control and interference in the spiritual life of religious organizations. The amendments are listed below.

4. A religious society or a group of believers may begin to function only after the Council for Religious Affairs... has made a decision regarding the registration of the society or group. The decision on the registration of a religious society or a group or believers and on the establishment of a prayer house is made by the council... on the recommendations of the Councils of Ministers if autonomous republics or the executive committees of regional, provincial or city (Moscow and Leningrad) soviets of workers' deputies.
5. In order to register a religious society its founders, consisting of at least twenty persons, address a petition to the executive committee of the district or city soviet... requesting the registration of the society and the opening of a prayer house... The Soviet addresses the received petition of the believers with its resolution to the Council of Ministers of the autonomous republic, [or] the executive committee of the regional, provincial, city (Moscow and Leningrad) soviet...
6. In order to effect the registration of the group, the petition signed by all the believers of the given group is submitted to the executive committee of the district or urban soviet... which forwards this petitions with its resolution attached to the Council of Ministers of an autonomous republic, to the executive committee of a regional, provincial or ([in the cases of] Moscow and Leningrad) city soviet...
7. The Council of Ministers of an autonomous republic, or the executive committee of a regional, provincial or city (Moscow and Leningrad [only]) soviet... having received the materials regarding the registration of a society or group of believers, is to complete their scrutiny within one month and then forward them with its representation to the Council for Religious Affairs of the USSR Council of Ministers for authorization. The Council for Religious Affairs... studies the materials... and makes the decision whether to register or to refuse to register the... group, and informs the latter on its decision.

According to Yakunin and Regelson, there was no time limit for when it had to make a decision and this legal ambiguity was abused by the CRA.

8. The Council for Religious Affairs keeps a register of all religious associations, houses of prayer and [other church] buildings... [and] establishes the order of submission of data on religious societies or groups of believers, their executive and auditing organs and the clergy.
10. For the satisfaction of religious needs the believers making up a religious society may, on the decision of the Council for Religious Affairs... receive a special building for prayer, free of charge, on the conditions... stipulated in the agreement concluded between the religious society and a legitimate representative of the executive committee of the district or urban soviet. In additions, believers comprising a religious society or a group of believers may use for their communal prayer other structures on lease holding conditions placed at their disposal by individual persons or executive committees of district or urban soviets... These structures are subject to all the regulations of the legislation in force regarding house of prayer... Moreover, these structures must correspond to the regular building and sanitary safety regulations. A religious society or group of believers may used only one house of prayer.
12. General meetings (other than prayer meetings) of religious societies and groups of believers may take place [only] on the permission of the executive committee of the district or urban soviet...
18. No religious doctrines whatsoever may be taught in educational institutions. The teaching of religion is permitted in theological schools only, which may be established in accordance with the existing regulations.
20. Religious societies and groups of believers may convoke religious congresses and conferences only with the express permission of the Council for Religious Affairs in each particular case. Religious centres, spiritual administrations and other religious organizations elected at such congresses and conferences have administrative jurisdiction only over the religious (canonical) activities of religious associations. They are supported by the contributions of religious associations collected exclusively by means of voluntary donations. Religious centres and diocesan administration have the right to produce church-plate and [other] objects of the religious cult, and to sell the same to societies of believers. [They also have the right] to obtain means of transportation, to rent, build and purchase buildings for their own needs in accordance with the legally established order.
27. Houses of prayer and religious belongings are transferred to the believers comprising a religious society for use on conditions and in the order established in the agreement concluded between the religious society and a plenipotentiary representative of the executive committee of a district or urban soviet...
33. Houses of religion must be insured at the cost of the persons signing the agreement [on the behalf of the religious society][but] in favour of the executive committee of that district or urban soviet... on whose territory the structure is situation. The insurance payments for prayer houses destroyed by fire and are used, in accordance with the decisions of the Council of Ministers of an autonomous republic or the executive committee of a regional, provincial or city (Moscow and Leningrad [alone]) soviet... coordinated with the Council for Religious Affairs, for the reconstruction of the ruin buildings or for the cultural needs of the district or town in which the ruined prayer house was situated.
34. If the believers do not submit a petition to lease to them for religious purposes a building and its belongings necessary for the religious cult... the Council of Ministers of an autonomous republic or the executive committee of a regional, provincial or city (Moscow and Leningrad [alone]) soviet... decides on the subsequent use o the prayer house and all its belongings in accordance with articles 40 and 41 of this enactment.
36. A cult building used by believers may be reassigned for other needs exclusively by a decision according to a decision o the Council of Ministers of the autonomous republic or oblast which must be supported by reasons, in a case where the building is needed for government or public purposes. The believers who formed the religious society shall be informed regarding such decision.

This allowed prayer houses to be closed down and reassigned for public purposes.

41. Prayer houses subject to closure which are not under state protection as cultural monuments may be... rebuilt for other uses or demolished only by the decision of the Council for Religious Affairs... on the representation from the Council of Ministers of an autonomous republic [etc.]...
43. Religious associations may be deprived of registration if they transgress the legislation on cults.

Deregistration of religious associations is enacted by the Council for Religious Affairs... on the representation from the Council of Ministers of an autonomous republic [etc.]...

1. In the case of non-observance by the religious association of the agreement on the use of the prayer house or cult belongings the Council for Religious Affairs... has the right to annul the agreement on a representation from the Council of Ministers of an autonomous republic [etc.]...
2. On the request of religious societies and with the permission of the Council for Religious Affairs... on the representation from the Council of Ministers of an autonomous republic [etc.]... believers may be permitted in individual cases to build new prayer houses out of their own resources.
54. Religious societies and members of groups of believers may voluntarily pool their resources together and solicit voluntary collections inside the prayer house among members of the given religious association for purposes connected with the maintenance of the building, [the purchase and upkeep] of the cult belongings, the hiring of the clergy, and support of the executive organs.
59. Religious processions, the performance of religious ceremonies in the open air, as well as in apartments and houses of believers, may take place only by the express permission in each individual case from the executive committee of the regional or urban soviet... Petitions for permissions [for the above ceremonies]... must be submitted at least two weeks prior to the date [of the desired action]... Religious ceremonies in private residences requested by dying or very seriously ill believers may be performed without the [above] permission or request [of the same]...
63. The Council of Ministers of an autonomous republic [etc.]... reports all information on religious associations to the CRA... in accordance with the established order.

=== Criminal Code of the USSR, 1 January 1979 ===
Article 142

The breaking of the laws on the separation of Church and State, and Schools and Church – is punishable by correctional labour for up to one year, or by a fine of up to fifty roubles... repeat offenders are to be imprisoned for up to three years.

Article 143

The hindrance of prevention of the fulfillment of religious functions, so far as they do not harm the social order or infringe upon individual rights – is punishable by correctional labour for up to six months by a public reprimand.

Article 142 could only be applied to believers who violated the law, while article 143 was for non-believers. This meant that in the unlikely scenario that a group of religious believers who sued a Soviet official, and an even less likely scenario of them winning the case, the guilty administrator would likely only have to face a public reprimand. No matter how many times such an official could be found guilty, the most he could be punished would be six months or correctional labour, while believers could face up to three years imprisonment.

Article 190

The systematic distribution of false information, harmful to the Soviet government, or to the social order, whether in oral, written, or any other form – is punishable by imprisonment for up to three years, or by correctional work for up to one year, or by a fine up to 100 roubles.

This included homilies condemning religious persecutions.

Article 199

... the unlicensed construction of a dwelling or an addition – is punishable by correctional work for a period of 6 months to one year with a confiscation of the construction or addition.

This punished the expansion of a church without government authorization.

Article 277

Organizations or the leadership of a group, which function under the guise of fulfilling religious duties, that are harmful, or that enlist other citizens into harmful activities by threat of expulsion from the religious group, or attempt to enlist or force others to enlist minors into the group – is punishable by imprisonment for up to five years, or banishment for up to five years with or without confiscation of property...

According to Pospielovsky, this was interpreted to prohibit any missionary work, and threatened with imprisonment any person who attracted converts or who strengthened religious convictions. This also allowed for the punishment of clergymen who tried to invoke spiritual discipline upon those under them who exhibited immoral or spiritually demoralizing behaviour.

Other laws not mentioned included prohibitions of teaching religion to children under the age of 18, requirements to register all baptisms and religious rites with the state, as well as forbidding of priests to be on church councils.

== See also ==
- Antisemitism in Russia
- Antisemitism in the Soviet Union
- Bezbozhnik
- Chinese Laws on Religious Activities
- Council for Religious Affairs
- Culture of the Soviet Union
- Demographics of the Soviet Union
- Persecutions of the Catholic Church and Pius XII
- Persecution of Christians in the Soviet Union
  - Persecution of Jehovah's Witnesses#Soviet Union
    - Operation North
- Antireligious campaigns of the Chinese Communist Party
- Persecution of Christians in the Eastern Bloc
- Persecution of Muslims in the former USSR
- Red Terror
- Religion in Russia
- Religion in the Soviet Union
- Society of the Godless
- Soviet Orientalist studies in Islam
- State atheism
- USSR anti-religious campaign (1917–1921)
- USSR anti-religious campaign (1921–1928)
- USSR anti-religious campaign (1928–1941)
- USSR anti-religious campaign (1958–1964)
- USSR anti-religious campaign (1970s–1987)
