= Eleanor Vere Boyle =

British artist (1825–1916)

- Born: Eleanor Vere Gordon; 1 May 1825; Maryculter, Kincardineshire, Scotland
- Died: 29 July 1916 (aged 91); Brighton, East Sussex, England
- Occupations: Illustrator, Writer
- Writing career
- Period: 19th century
- Genre: Children's Literature

Eleanor Vere Boyle (née Gordon; 1 May 1825 – 29 July 1916) was a Scottish artist of the Victorian era whose work consisted mainly of watercolor illustrations in children's books. These illustrations were strongly influenced by the Pre-Raphaelites, highly detailed and haunting in content. Love and death were popular subject matter of Pre-Raphaelite art and something that can be seen in Boyle's work. Dante Gabriel Rossetti, the founder of the Pre-Raphaelite Brotherhood, called her work "great in design."

However, even though she was one of the first woman artists to be recognised for her achievements, she did not exhibit or sell work often, as it was not acceptable given her family's aristocratic background. Thus, she signed her works "EVB" to obscure her identity and quickly became one of the most important female illustrators in the 1860s.

== Life ==
Vere Boyle's illustration of Beauty and the Beast, 1875

Eleanor Vere Gordon was born in 1825 in Scotland, at Auchlunies House in Maryculter, Kincardineshire, (now Aberdeenshire), the daughter of Alexander Gordon of Ellon Castle, the illegitimate son of George Gordon, 3rd Earl of Aberdeen. Her mother, Albinia Elizabeth Cumberland, was the granddaughter of the dramatist Richard Cumberland and George Hobart, 3rd Earl of Buckinghamshire. The youngest of nine children, she was raised in the Scottish hills above the River Dee. The diplomat George John Robert Gordon was her elder brother. She later moved to England and married Hon. Richard Cavendish Boyle, son of the 8th Earl of Cork and chaplain to Queen Victoria.

Boyle's fascination with nature strongly influenced her later work, which primarily consisted of garden books after her husband died. However, during her lifetime, up until she died in 1916, she produced, and was praised for, work for children's books. Eleanor had written or illustrated twenty-one books in about a fifty-year time-span. All these works were inspired by many things in which Eleanor was fascinated: nature, but also fate, dreams and flowing water.

== Principal works ==
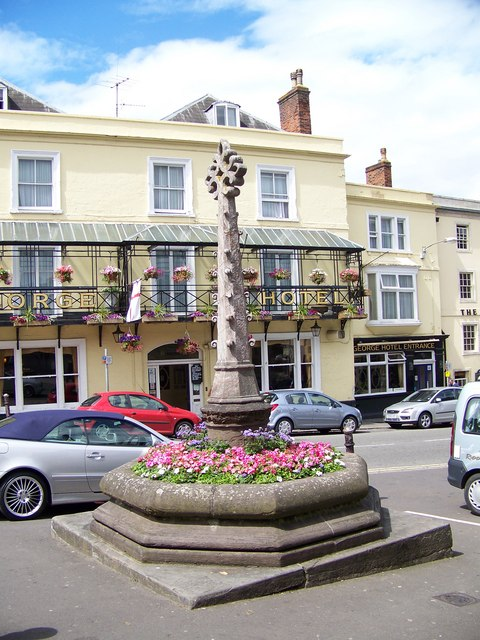
The Boyle Cross in Frome, Somerset was designed by Boyle.

Her fascinations and their influence were clear in her illustrations she created for the poet Tennyson's May Queen in 1852. Such fascinations were even more evident in her illustrations for Hans Christian Andersen’s fairy tales in 1872, which was one of the earliest editions illustrated by an English person. It included twelve full color images and many other line drawings. Andersen had a definite dark side to many of his stories. With Boyle's ability to translate it into visual form with her own slightly sinister taste, this edition was made to be one of the most cohesive between illustration and writing. This cohesiveness set a new standard for the future illustration in Hans Andersen’s work. Some of the most highly acclaimed illustrations from this book include: "The Snow Queen," The Wild Swans," "The Ugly Duckling," "The Little Mermaid," "Thumbkinetta," "The Garden of Paradise," "The Fellow Traveller" (which inspired Tolkien's The Hobbit) and "The Angel."

Three years later, in 1875, Boyle created what is considered one of her greatest works, a retelling and illustration of the story Beauty and the Beast. This book includes ten full colour images. She is praised most for her unique take on the Beast. While this story has been illustrated many times, Boyle's version seems to be the first and only to be reminiscent of a sea-creature, with walrus-like tusks and flippers. This is different from the usual humanistic portrayal. Boyle veers away from all normalities of the character, lacking an upright position, human facial features and clothes.

Other notable works by Boyle are her illustrations in The Story Without an End and Child’s Play, as well as her illustrations and writings in Ros Rosarum Ex Horto Poetarum (1885). The Story Without an End is originally a German story by Friedrich Wilhelm Carové. It was later translated by Sarah Austin into English, and illustrated by Boyle. On the other hand, Child’s Play and Ros Rosarum ex Horto Poetarum were written by Boyle herself. In Child’s Play, she matched famous nursery rhymes with her illustrations, and in Ros Rosarum ex Horto Poetarum she wrote poems and created illustrations for them. Ros Rosarum Ex Horto Poetarum is subtitled "Dew of the Ever-living Rose, Gathered from the Poets' Gardens of Many Lands". It is one of the most highly acclaimed works by scholars and claimed to be culturally important.

Boyle continued to write, with a focus on nature, as she wrote and illustrated garden books. In the last thirty-two years of her life, she wrote and illustrated four: Days and Hours in a Garden (1884), A Garden of Pleasure (1895), Seven Gardens and a Palace (1900), and Garden Colour (1905). Her last work came eight years prior to her death: The Peacock's Pleasaunce (1908), a collection of twelve essays (considered belles-lettres) accompanied by eight of her own illustrations.

== Other works ==
- A Child's Summer (1853)
- In the Fir-Wood (1866)
- A New Child's Play (1877)
- A London Sparrow at the Colinderies (1887)
- A Midsummer-Night Dream (1887)
- Sylvana's Letters to an Unknown Friend (1900)
