= Opposition to the Russian Orthodox Church during the Russian Civil War =

Religious repression in Russia from 1917 to 1922

After the Russian Civil War erupted in 1917, the opposition to the Russian Orthodox Church and its institutions strengthened in territories held by the former Russian Empire. The initial anti-religious campaign of Bolsheviks after the fall of the Tsarist regime and the Bolshevik seizure of power in 1917 focused on targeting Eastern Orthodox Church, seizing its assets, and depriving the church of its capacity to function through antireligious legislation.

== Background ==
=== Religious situation before the October Revolution ===
Since 1721, the Russian Orthodox Church (ROC) had been the established church of the Russian Empire. The church reforms introduced by Peter I introduced a period of Caesaropapism to the ROC. This meant that while the ROC enjoyed substantial privileges, it was nevertheless subordinated to the state. As the intelligentsia became more critical of the Tsarist regime, this was often accompanied by a rejection of the ROC, and sometimes by a rejection of religion in general. Others, such as Leo Tolstoy retained a strong Christian belief but rejected the autocracy. He was excommunicated by the ROC. Some Bolsheviks, such as Vladimir Bonch-Bruyevich became involved with the religious minorities collectively called the sectarians. Bonch-Bruyevich joined Tolstoy and Vladimir Chertkov in supporting the Dukhobors, even sailing with a group of them when they migrated to Canada.

In 1914, there were 55,173 Russian Orthodox churches and 29,593 chapels, 112,629 priests and deacons, 550 monasteries and 475 convents with a total of 95,259 monks and nuns in Russia.

=== Following the Bolshevik seizure of power ===
Eleven days following the storming of the Winter Palace a council of the Russian Orthodox church reestablished the patriarchate (it had been abolished under Peter the Great in 1721) and elected Metropolitan Tikhon of Moscow (Vassily I. Bellavin) as patriarch. Tikhon refused to take sides in the civil war, although the official Bolshevik propaganda presented him, as well as the Church, as supporting the whites. The Bolsheviks used the alleged support of the Russian Orthodox Church for the Whites as their justification for killing clergy in massive numbers. Following the Bolshevik seizure of power, one issue they faced was the removal of the privileged position of the ROC. The Declaration of the Rights of the Peoples of Russia (November 2/15, 1917) removed special privileges based on faith or nationality. This was soon followed by a decision by Sovnarkom to confiscate all the ROC's monasteries and educational establishments. When the Bolsheviks seized the Holy Synod's printing house, relations between them and the ROC became further strained.

== Persecution of the Church during the Civil War ==
During the Russian Civil War, the Red Army massacred large numbers of clergy and believers often on grounds of alleged support for the Whites; much of these killings were not officially instigated from the top, but were done on the initiative of local units of soldiers. In later years, the church would declare that the excommunication was a misunderstanding based on the belief that these killings were officially instigated (however, they were never officially repudiated either).

Many monasteries were attacked. Holy Mountain Monastery near Kharkov was plundered very early in the civil war. In a nearby skete in the village of Gorokhova a monk named Izrail was murdered for refusing to hand over the keys to the skete cellars. In the same area, a religious procession was attacked on its way as it rested the night, and two priests, a deacon, the owner of the cottage where they were staying at as well as his daughter were all killed.

Metropolitan Vladimir (Bogoyavlensky) of Kiev was the first bishop killed by the Bolsheviks on January 25, 1918. He had consistently opposed the revolution, and he was severely beaten as well as tortured before being shot outside the Monastery of the Caves. Before being shot he prayed to God for his killers to be forgiven.

Yakov Sverdlov ("president" of Soviet Russia) ordered in June 1918 to take hostages from the ranks of industrial entrepreneurs, members of the Liberal and Menshevik parties as well as the clergy. Few of these hostages would survive.

Between June 1918 and January 1919, in Russia (but not including the Volga, Kama and several other regions) there were killed 1 metropolitan, 18 bishops, 102 priests, 154 deacons, 94 monks and nuns, and there were imprisoned four bishops, and 211 priests. The state sequestered 718 parishes and 15 monasteries, it closed 94 churches and 26 monasteries, it desecrated 14 churches and 9 chapels, it forbade 18 religious processions, it dispersed by force 41 religious processions, and it interrupted church services with insults to religious feelings in 22 cities and 96 villages.

The orthodox church must have thought that the Bolsheviks would lose power, because after Tikhon's election it declared that the Russian Orthodox Church was the national church of Russia, that the state needed church approval to legislate on church matters, that blasphemy should remain illegal, that church schools should be recognized and that the head of the state as well as the top appointees in education as well as religious affairs should be Orthodox.

The Orthodox were the primary target due to their association with the old regime, although other religions were attacked as well. A Polish priest named Krapiwnicki in 1918 was arrested on the feast of Corpus Christi and scheduled for execution, but the execution was called off after intervention from the Polish government. After the papal protest against the persecution of the Orthodox church, the regime retaliated by arresting Archbishop de Ropp of the Roman Catholic diocese of Mogilev in April 1919, but he was later released to Poland in exchange for a Polish communist named Radek who had been arrested in Poland. Despite the fact that non-Orthodox religions had been persecuted under Tsarist Russia, leaders of other faith communities (Christians, Muslims and Jews) gave messages of sympathy to the Orthodox church during this time. Many of these sects that had been persecuted by the Orthodox state found themselves better prepared for the situation post-1917 than the Orthodox church.

The state initially showed a friendly attitude towards Protestant evangelicals and Muslims, while maintaining some pretense that they were only fighting against the Orthodox hierarchy for its relationship with the Tsar and not against religion generally. The leader of Russia's Protestant evangelicals, Ivan Prokhanov, joined the Bolsheviks in denouncing the Orthodox church as reactionary.

The Mennonite community numbered 110,000 in 1917, and it would emigrate from Russia in massive numbers in the following decade.

There were 1.6 million Roman Catholics on the territory of the new state in 1917. There had been over 15 million prior to the war, but after Poland and the western territories were lost, this number shrunk greatly.

Christians outside of orthodoxy would actually have some benefit of increasing membership in the succeeding years even while the Orthodox church declined in membership. In 1900 about 11 percent of the population were Christians belonging to non-Orthodox groupings (not including Roman Catholics) and by 1970 this number had become 31 percent.

=== Examples ===
In the Don region in February 1918, the Reds were killing every priest they could find. An 80-year-old monk-priest named Amvrosi was beaten with rifle butts before being killed. A priest named Dimitri was brought to a cemetery and undressed, but when he tried to cross himself before being killed, a soldier chopped off his right arm. An old priest who tried to stop the execution of a peasant was beaten and cut to pieces with swords. In the Holy Saviour Monastery, Red soldiers arrested and killed the 75-year-old abbot by scalping him and beheading him. In the Kherson province a priest was crucified. In a Kuban Cossack village an eighty-year-old priest was forced to wear women's clothing, brought to the village square and ordered to dance; when he refused, he was hanged.

In the Kuban Cossack village of Plotavy, Fr Yakov Vladimirov was targeted by the Cheka for his popularity. They executed him along with wife and one of his sons (he had two sons, but they killed a different child in place of that son by mistake).

Bishop Hermogenes (Dolganyov) of Tobolsk, was killed along with other detainees on 16 June 1918 by drowning. He had organized a religious procession the day after the Tsar had come through Tobolsk on their way to Ekaterinburg (April 28), in which he blessed the royal family. He was arrested the following week and the Soviets promised to release him for 10,000 roubles, and later 100,000 roubles. When the ransom was collected and submitted, the delegation of notables and clergy that had delivered it were arrested as well (and later executed). Germogen was reportedly taken on a river steamer, rocks were attached to his head and he was thrown into the water.

Archbishop Joachim of Nizhni Novgorod was murdered by red forces who hanged him head down on the iconostasis above the central 'Royal Doors'. The clergy in the Crimea suffered terribly: one priest named Ugliansky was killed by Red forces on grounds that he used green ribbons instead of red ribbons on the church icon lamps. Churches in Simferopol, Feodosia and other parts of the Crimea were desecrated and their clergy were brutally murdered.

Filosof Ornatsky, a priest in Petrograd, was arrested in the spring of 1918 after giving a public requiem for victims of the Bolsheviks. He and thirty-two others were driven to a cliff overlooking the Gulf of Finland, where the priest was allowed to perform a brief funeral service and bless the victims, before they were all shot and dropped into the sea. Archpriest John Vostorgov in Moscow, a famous Orthodox missionary and church activist, preached against the Bolsheviks and as a result he was black-mailed by the Bolsheviks, arrested and executed. He was executed along with Roman Catholic priest Lutoslawski and his brother, two tsarist ministers (N. Maklakov and Alexei Khvostov), an Orthodox bishop Efren, former State Council Chairman Ivan Shcheglovitov and Senator S. Beletsky. Fr Vostorgov conducted a short funeral service and preached to his victims to face death as a sacrifice of atonement, after which each victim came forward to be blessed by Fr Vostorgov and the Bishop; then they were shot.

During the Red occupation of Stavropol diocese in 1918, the Bolsheviks killed at least 52 Orthodox priests, four deacons and four lectors. Priest Alexander Podolsky was tortured and killed for giving a Te Deum service for a Cossack regiment before it attacked the Bolsheviks. When a peasant came to collect his body, the peasant was shot dead on the spot. Fr Alexei Miliutinsky was tortured, scalped and killed for preaching to Red army soldiers that they were leading Russia to disaster and for offering prayers for the Cossacks. Even left-wing priests could be killed, such as Ivan Prigorsky who was taken out of church on Holy Saturday into the street, where Red soldiers cursed him, mutilated his face and then killed him.

In the diocese of Perm, during 1918, at least 42 churchmen were murdered. A priest in Perm was killed by the Cheka who cut out his cheeks and eyes, and then paraded him through the streets before he was buried alive. Adronik, the archbishop of Perm, was arrested immediately after the rite of anathema was performed in his cathedral. He was probably executed some time shortly after December 1919. As a result of the unusual situation in which the local residents gave the Cheka popular support for these actions, they followed up Adronik's murder with mass killings of Perm's clergy including vicar-bishop Feofan of Solikamsk. A delegation from the All-Russian Church Sobor in Moscow went to Perm to investigate what had happened. While returning, however, their train was boarded and they were all shot by Red soldiers.

In the town of Chorny Yar on the Volga, a lay missionary named Lev Z. Kunsevich, proclaimed the Patriarch's encyclical to a crowd of people. Kunsevich was arrested and publicly shot in July 1918.

Bishop Macarius (Gnevushev) of Vyazma, who was beloved by the local population, was arrested as a result of his popularity in the summer of 1918. He was executed along with fourteen others in a field near Smolensk, whom he ministered and attempted to comfort with blessings before their execution. One of the soldiers who executed him afterward confessed on his deathbed that he had killed a saint.

Bishop Nikodim (Kononov) of Belgorod, condemned acts of violence, plunder and murder in his sermons and he was arrested by the local Cheka commandant, Saenko, at Christmas 1918. Resistance from the population in protest to his arrest, caused Saenko to release him and ordered him not to preach those things again. The bishop continued to preach these things, however, and he was arrested again. A priest's wife who went to plead on the bishop's behalf was executed on the spot. The bishop was killed soon after, but they disguised his corpse to make it look like a soldier and threw it into the common graveyard.

On January 14, 1919, in the Estonian University town of Tartu, retreating Red soldiers killed twenty clerics. Among those killed was Bishop Platon (Kulbusch) of Tallinn, two orthodox priests, a Lutheran pastor and sixteen laymen.

Bishop Leontius (von Wimpffen) was murdered along with most of the diocesan clergy in 1919 after he made a sermon that quoted Jesus' words "I was naked and you have clothed me, I was ill and you looked after me" and this quotation was interpreted as an attack against the Bolsheviks.

== Muslims ==
Many Muslims in the Russian Empire were attracted to the Bolsheviks' anti-imperialist stance, due to the imperialism of Western powers over Muslim nations. The Muslim Socialist Committee of Kazan (MSK; Russian: Мусульманский социалистический комитет) was established following the February Revolution.

Despite their hard anti-religious stance, the Bolsheviks in the years following the revolution and during the civil war, were in a very poor position to fight against Islam in Central Asia. Therefore, the Bolsheviks appealed to them as allies and promised them political independence and religious freedom. Lenin even voiced admiration of Muslims who had fought against imperialism and saw Muslim folk heroes as emblems of the struggle against imperialism.

In 1917, the Bolsheviks made this pronouncement to Muslims in Russia:

To all toiling Moslems of Russia and the East, whose mosques and prayer-houses have been destroyed, whose beliefs have been trampled on by the czars and the oppressors of Russia. Your beliefs and customs, your national and cultural institutions are declared henceforth free and inviolable. Organize your national life freely and without hindrance. This is your right. Know that your rights ... are protected by the entire might of the revolution and its organs.... Support this revolution and its government!

Many Muslims embraced this call and saw this revolution as a means of empowering Islam. An influential group of Central Asian Marxists led by Sultan Galiev then took the initiative to try to reform Islam for the modern era and they were accepted by the state as a buffer between itself and the native population of the central Asian republics.

== Reaction of the populace ==
The populations of some areas protected their churches and clergy, and even to pay for church costs after the state deprived it of any funding; after the elimination of all state support for religion, congregations had to rely entirely upon voluntary donations and voluntary support from their parishioners in order to continue. The Te Deum service was banned, but in some places such services in defiance. Some places, such as the city of Iuzovka (Donetsk) the miners and industrial workers threatened the Bolsheviks with rebellion if they harmed the clergy or the Church, and the Bolsheviks took no action as a result. In other places, the people were so afraid of the terror tactics that they remained passive and even clergymen would give in to obedience to Bolshevik demands.

Leagues of laymen began to form in many cities for the Church's defence. In Moscow and Petrograd 6-10% of their population joined these leagues. These leagues took action in preventing the state from taking over monasteries. Between February and May 1918, 687 persons were killed in clashes between these leagues and the government.

== Nationalization of church property ==
Lenin's decree on the separation of church and state on January 23, 1918 (Julian calendar) deprived the formerly official church of its status of legal person, the right to own property or to teach religion in both state and private schools or to any group of minors. This measure was meant to cripple the church and allow for its collapse. All theological schools were closed as well as all monasteries and convents eventually. With the eradication of the church's legal status, the laity of the Russian Orthodox Church increasingly gained control over their parishes, which led to some conflicts between the laity and clergy. The new government for the next few years launched a campaign to seize church property. Churches were closed, and could be converted to other uses, such as government departments, collective farm community centers, and warehouses.

This order to seize property was carried out with ruthless violence by Red soldiers. They often opened fire on crowds that surrounded churches in an attempt to defend them and on religious processions in protest against Church persecution. Thousands were killed in this way, especially in the spring of 1918. Shooting down of religious processions are well documented in Voronezh, Shatsk (Tambov province), and Tula (where thirteen were killed and many wounded, including Bishop Kornilii).

Patriarch Tikhon excommunicated the Soviet leadership on January 19, 1918 (Julian calendar) for conducting this campaign. In retaliation the regime arrested and killed dozens of bishops, thousands of the lower clergy and monastics, and multitudes of laity. The seizing of church property over the next few years would be marked by a brutal campaign of violent terror.

High ranking Orthodox bishops issued reports that called for the church to focus more on combatting atheism among the Russian populace in 1918–1919. They also issued statements of concern over liturgical changes that were being carried out by priests.

== Rejection of miracles ==
It was ideologically important for the government to suppress and disprove accounts of miracles that contradicted Marxist atheism. To this effect the government issued a decree on March 1, 1919, regarding "the complete liquidation of the cult of corpses and mummies", which ordered the public exposure of saints' relics in order to show them to be frauds (to counter the belief that the saints' bodies were miraculously preserved). In 1918 there were even calls to outlaw the sacrament of the Eucharist on account of its miraculous transformation as believed by Orthodox and Catholic Christians.

The body of St Sergius of Radonezh was exposed as fraudulent and the Soviet media eagerly spread this news that there was nothing but rotten bones and dust in his shrine. Revolution and the Church wrote: "Believers no longer weep, don't fall into fits of hysteria, and don't hold a grudge against the Soviet government anymore. They see there has been no blasphemy... Only an age-old fraud has been made naked in the eyes of the nation."

From the St Sergius-Trinity Monastery where these relics came from, an entirely different story was circulated that when the relics were exposed it was found that the saint's body was in excellent condition (he had lived in the 14th century), and when the crowd of believers that had come there saw this they fell on their knees in prayer, while the Bolshevik commander was pulled off his horse and beaten by the crowd. A similar event occurred in the city of Vladimir when the relics of two saints were exposed and the doctor who had acted as medical state witness reconfirmed his faith according to his own testimony.

There were a number of instances, however, where nothing but cloth and rotten bones was found. The exposure of Tikhon of Zadonsk and some Novgorodian saints were examples of this. The anti-religious press after such instances would declare that the church had been deceiving the nation. Bishop Alexii of Novgorod later declared, however, that the church did not teach that the saints must necessarily be immune to decay or that non-corruption of the body was proof of sainthood.

Stories of supernatural manifestations in the families of fanatical communists where some members were practicing Christian were allegedly common in the early post-1917 years. The most common of such miracles reported were sudden renovations of family icons that had gone dark over years would suddenly shine with fresh colours as though newly painted before the eyes of the communist. Some of the communists converted back to the Church after such events. The Soviet propaganda countered these claims by claiming that they were tricks created by priests and kulaks to dupe people.

The Sretenskaia church at the Sennoi marketplace in Kiev had two gold-plated domes that had for been completely tarnished after many years. These domes experienced similar renovations one day, when light shone so brightly from the domes that it was at first thought to be on fire, and a huge crowd gathered to see it with an atmosphere of religious euphoria. The light reportedly moved in patches around the dome for three days as they were progressively "renovated". The local communist newspaper then printed two articles, one of them signed by members of the Academy of Sciences, which stated that the phenomenon was caused by a rare air wave containing a peculiar electric discharge. A witness claimed it later became known that the GPU had forced the Academy to say this, and that there were other gold-plated things in the area that were not similarly renovated. Several months later, the church was blown up. A similar event occurred at the church of the Holy Jordan, also in Kiev, which was also blown up soon afterward.

One of the most famous of these supposed miracles occurred in the village of Kalinovka near Vinnitsa in Ukraine. A detachment of mounted police had come to the village in order to close the local church, but they were met by hostile crowds. The crowds were too big for the police to force their way through and so they retreated. Not far from the church, however, there was a traditional Crucifix standing at a crossroads, and the policemen in frustration fired at the crucifix. One of the bullets hit the crucifix in Christ's side and, reportedly, blood suddenly gushed out of the hole. One of the policemen lost control of himself and fell off his horse, while the others took off. The crowd went on its knees and prayed in front of the bleeding crucifix. The news spread and thousands of people came to see it. The blood reportedly kept running out for several days. Soon after more police came with orders to hack down the crucifix, but each time they returned in failure under the claim that some force was preventing them from approaching it. The local communist press tried to explain the phenomena by claiming that there had been an accumulation of water in the wooden cross behind the metallic figure, and that once the bullet hit the metal, the water, which had turned red from the metal's rust, must have seeped through. The crowds brought crosses with them that they set up beside it, prayed before it and dipped cloths in the miraculous blood. For days and nights, they sang hymns as well as burned candles. Priests were absent in fear. Many atheists reportedly converted after seeing this. At the first opportunity the Soviets destroyed the bleeding Crucifix and all adjacent crosses. It was later claimed that a commission of experts had reported that the fluid coming out of the bullet hole was not blood. The people who had gathered there that day were later depicted as drunkards, fools, and scum, and it was claimed that the kissing of the Crucifix had resulted in an outbreak of syphilis and mass robberies.

== Other legislation and official measures ==
In November 1917, within weeks of the revolution, the People's Commissariat for Education was established, which a month later created the All-Russian Union of Teachers-Internationalists for the purpose of removing religious instruction from school curricula. In order to intensify the anti-religious propaganda in the school system, the Chief Administration for Political Enlightenment (Glavpolitprosvet) was established in November 1920.

After the registration of marriage was secularized, local governments began to force the clergy to remarry those who had had their marriages annulled by civil divorce. The church was only willing to remarry those who conformed to church canons (from Jesus' sermon on the mount when He declares it wrong to divorce and remarry except on grounds of unchastity). This situation was solved in May 1920 when the Patriarch relegated all formal marriage and divorce proceedings to the civil authorities.

Prior to the revolution, Lenin had accepted believers into the ranks of the Bolshevik party, so long as they worked towards the party goals. This was because the initial conquest of power was a higher priority than the dissemination of atheism. After the Bolsheviks took power, old party members who were believers received some tolerance in exceptional cases initially. Yaroslavsky in later years recalled an episode wherein an old party member wrote on the top of a questionnaire: 'In the name of the Father, and of the Son, and of the Holy Spirit. Amen.

It was originally believed in the ideology that religion would disappear quickly with the coming of the revolution and that its replacement with atheism would be inevitable. The leadership of the new state did not take much time, however, to come to the conclusion that religion would not disappear on its own and greater efforts should be given to anti-religious propaganda.

For this purpose atheistic work was centrally consolidated underneath the Agitation and Propaganda Department of the CP Central Committee (Agitprop) in 1920 using the guidelines of article 13 of the Russian Communist Party (RCP) adopted by the 8th party congress.

Article 13 stated

As far as religion is concerned, the RCP will not be satisfied by the decreed separation of Church and State... The Party aims at the complete destruction of links between the exploiting classes and... religious propaganda, while assisting the actual liberation of the working masses from religious prejudices and organizing the broadest possible education-enlightening and anti-religious propaganda. At the same time it is necessary carefully to avoid any insult to the believers' feelings, which would lead to the hardening of religious fanaticism.

The article would be very important in anti-religious policy in the USSR in later years, and its last sentence, which would be both ignored and recalled back at different point in Soviet history, would play an important role in later rivalries in the power struggles of later years between different Soviet leaders.

== Anti-monastic campaign ==
The state took a particular hard-line against monasticism in the Orthodox church, which it saw as being a critical institution for the spiritual life of the church especially through their function as centres of pilgrimage. The prestige they had, as well as the possibility of their use to co-ordinate resistance, also provoked the state. A widespread campaign to liquidate monasteries was undertaken with much brutality and many monks and monastic believers were killed.

By 1921 the number of liquidated monasteries and convents rose to 573. They were liquidated on the basis that they were parasitic communities. The Patriarch in response turned monasteries into working communes on the model of voluntary Orthodox Christian agrarian communes (in existence pre-1917). The regime responded to this move by accusing the Church of trying to create its own state and economy, and forbade it from doing this.

== Anti-religious propaganda ==
Atheistic propaganda was considered to be of essential importance to Lenin's party from its early pre-revolutionary days and the regime was quick to create atheist journals to attack religion shortly after its coming to power. The first operated under the name Revolution and the Church (Revolustiia i tserkov) published by the People's Commissariat for Justice. This publication in its earliest editions attacked the Orthodox church as a fraud and tried to sow division by singling out the Orthodox for attack, while presenting Protestants and Muslims as supportive of the state.

Public debates were held between Christians and atheists after the revolution up until they were suspended in 1929. Among famous participants of these debates included on the atheist side, Commissar for Enlightenment Anatoly Lunacharsky. People would line up for hours in order to get seats to see them. The authorities sometimes tried to limit the speaking time of the Christians to ten minutes, and on other occasions the debates would be called off at last minute. Professor V.S. Martsinkovsky, raised as orthodox but who had become an evangelical Protestant was one of the best on the religious side, and Lunacharsky reportedly canceled one of his debates with him after having lost in a previous debate. On one occasion in 1921 a large crowd of Komsomol hecklers arrived at one of Martsinkovsky's debates and occupied the two front rows. When the leader tried to heckle, he found himself unsupported by his boys, and afterwards they told the Komsomol leader that he hadn't said what they were told he was going to say.

During the Second World War Metropolitan Sergii of Vilnius, an Orthodox bishop described the Bolshevik actions in regard to the Orthodox church as demonstrating the "utmost cruelty" and claimed that Orthodox Christians were persecuted for their belief, rather than because the Bolsheviks saw the church as a counter-revolutionary focal point for opposition to their regime.

== See also ==
- Marxist–Leninist atheism
- Persecution of Christians in the Soviet Union
- Persecution of Christians in Warsaw Pact countries
- Soviet anti-religious legislation
- USSR anti-religious campaign (1921–1928)
- USSR anti-religious campaign (1928–1941)
- USSR anti-religious campaign (1958–1964)
- USSR anti-religious campaign (1970s–1990)
