= German Catholic Women's Association =

Catholic women's organization

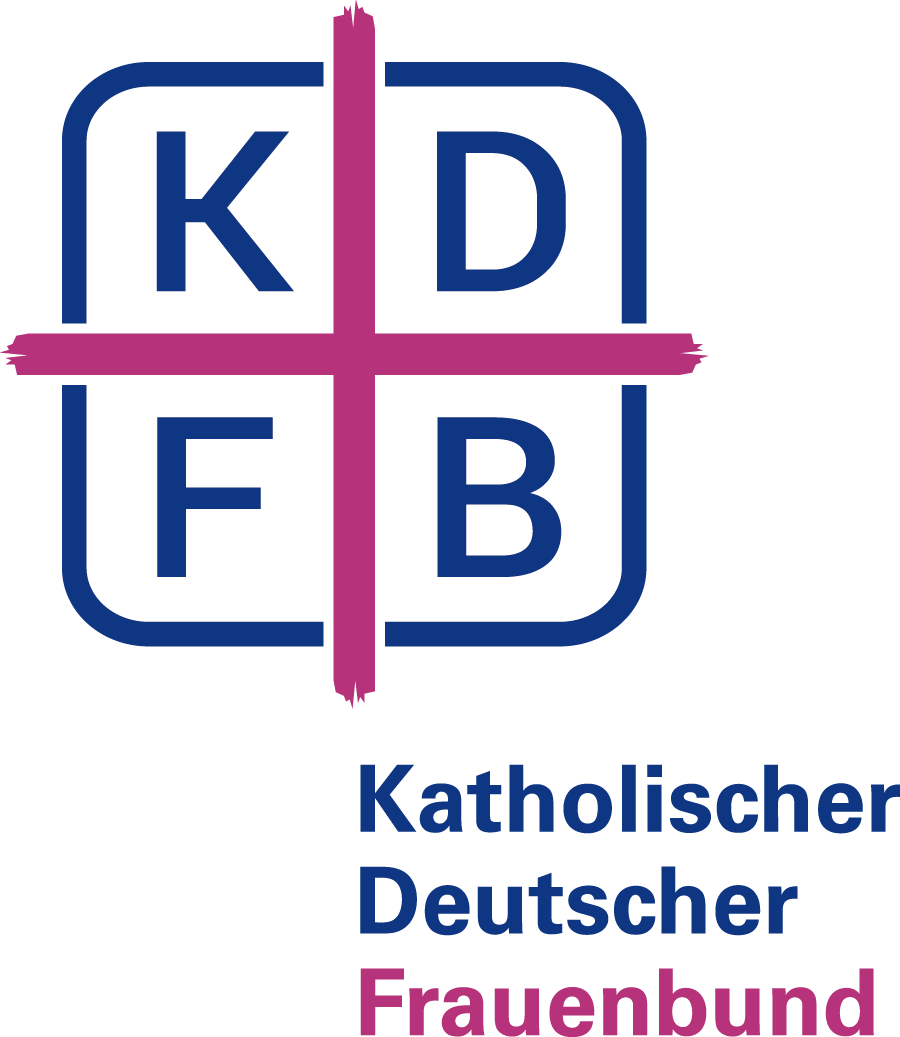
- Formation: 6 November 1903; 122 years ago
- Type: Catholic lay organization
- Legal status: active
- Headquarters: Cologne, North Rhine-Westphalia; Germany
- Region served: Germany
- President: Maria Flachsbarth
- Parent organization: Catholic Church
- Website: KDFB

The German Catholic Women's Association (German: Katholischer Deutscher Frauenbund), abbreviated as KDFB, is a federally registered Catholic lay women's organization and political interest group. The association has roughly 180,000 members in Germany with 1,800 branches in twenty-one German dioceses.

The KDFB focuses on advocating for the rights of women in the Catholic Church in Germany and organizing educational seminars, crisis support programs, and religious pilgrimages and devotions for Catholic women. The KDFB promotes gender equality, environmental protections, charity, and education as Christian issues. The organization has been criticized by conservative Catholic organizations, such as the Forum of German Catholics, for supporting the Mary 2.0 movement and advocating for legal protections, equality, and Catholic blessings of same-sex couples.

== History ==
The KDFB was founded on 16 November 1903 in Cologne for women of the Catholic laity as part of the Women's Movement in Germany. The founding chairwoman was Emilie Hopmann, who served as chair of the association until 1912. Hopmann co-founded the KDFB with Minna Bachem-Sieger and Hedwig Dransfeld. Dransfeld worked closely with the women's rights activist Ellen Ammann, who founded the Munich branch of the KDFB in 1904. Later that year Emy Gordon founded a branch of the KDFB in Würzburg. In 1911 Marie Zettler and Countess Pauline von Monteglas helped start the Bavarian branch of the organization. Zettler was elected as the Bavarian Secretary of KDFB in 1912 and remained in the position for forty years. The organization was originally called Katholische Frauenbund. The name changed in 1916 to Catholic Women's Association of Germany. It changed again in 1921 to Katholischer Deutscher Frauenbund.

The KDFB originally served as a union of Catholic women from all social and economic classes, ages, and professions focused on service to the Catholic Church and the German people. The primary goal of the organization was to provide education to women, opening social women's schools in Munich, Cologne, Aachen, and Berlin. The KDFB also opened marriage counseling centers, family education centers, and helped organize maternity holidays. During the Great Depression in Central Europe, the KDFB campaigned for working rights for unmarried women and opened career counseling centers in Cologne and Berlin.

== Function and activities ==
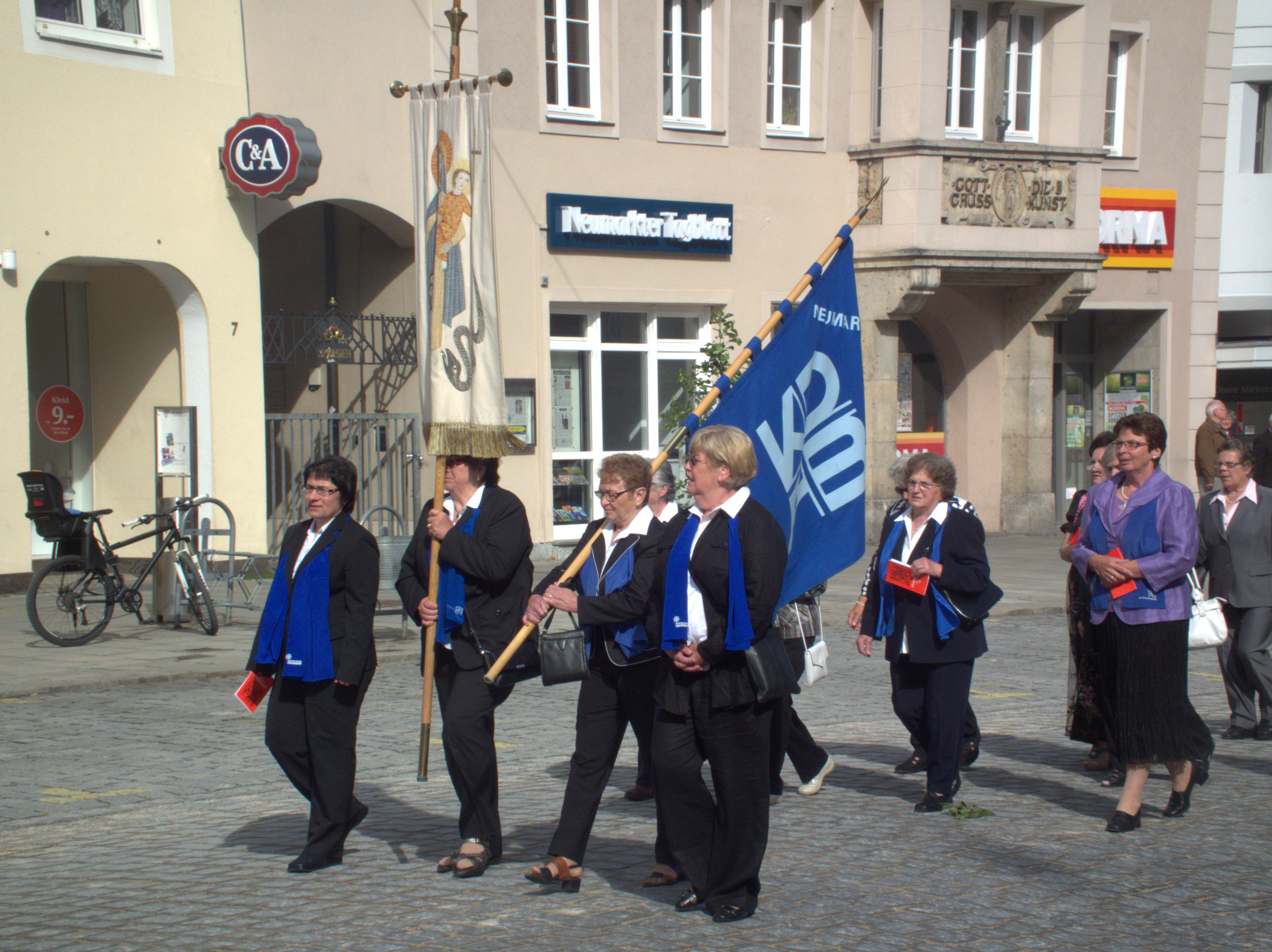
Members in a Corpus Christi procession in 2012.

The KDFB offers educational programs and seminars, social justice work, and crisis support for women, as well as information on Catholic teachings and advocacy for women's rights in society, government, and the Catholic Church. The KDFB organizes religious services, devotions, and pilgrimages. They also participate in Women's World Prayer Day annually.

The organization supports environmental protections, gender equality, charitable work, and education and advocates that these issues pertain to Christianity.

The KDFB advocates supports same-sex marriage in Germany and advocates for Catholic blessings of same-sex couples.

The KDFB publicly supports the Mary 2.0 movement, which works to bring awareness to sexism in the Catholic Church and the mishandling of the clerical sex abuse crisis. The movement also calls for an end to mandatory celibacy for priests and to reform the Church's teachings on sexuality. In 2019 the KDFB was criticized by the Forum of German Catholics, who called for a boycott of the association after it had publicly supported the Mary 2.0 movement.
