= Pauline von Montgelas =

German Catholic activist

- Full name: Pauline Mathilde Sophie de Garnerin de la Thuile von Montgelas
- Born: Pauline Mathilde Sophie von Wimpffen; 28 February 1874; Rome, Kingdom of Italy
- Died: 10 May 1961 (aged 87); Rottach-Egern, Germany
- Noble family: Wimpffen (by birth); Garnerin von Montgelas (by marriage)
- Spouse: Count Maximilian von Montgelas
- Father: Count Felix von Wimpffen
- Mother: Countess Margarethe von Lynar
- Occupation: Catholic activist, writer, photographer

Countess Pauline Mathilde Sophie de Garnerin de la Thuile von Montgelas (née von Wimpffen; 28 February 1874 - 10 May 1961) was an Italian-born German writer, photographer, and Catholic activist. She was a leading figure in the development of the German Catholic Women's Association and a staunch opponent of Nazism during World War II. Von Montgelas worked extensively in advocating for the rights of women working in domestic service and wrote articles about social responsibility for The Christian Woman.

== Biography ==
Von Montgelas was born Countess Pauline Mathilde Sophie von Wimpffen on 28 February 1874 in Rome to Countess Margarethe von Lynar and Count Felix von Wimpffen. Since her father was a diplomat, who served as an ambassador of Austria-Hungary, she spent much of her childhood in different European cities including Rome, Berlin, and Paris.

When she was twenty-three years old, she married Count Maximilian von Montgelas. From 1900 to 1903, she lived in Beijing, where her husband worked as a military attaché. While living in China, Von Montgelas traveled extensively around South Asia. In 1906 she published a book, including her own photographic works, on her travels titled Pictures from South Asia. Upon moving back to Germany, she and her husband took up residence in Munich, where she became involved in the Marian Girls Protection Association, a lay Catholic organization. Through this organization she met Ellen Ammann, with whom she helped found a Munich-based branch of the German Catholic Women's Association. Von Montgelas was elected as the second chairperson of the association, taking over management of the social programs which included advocating and caring for waitresses, maids, and other domestic workers. She also founded the Trade Association of Home Workers in Germany, the Catholic Workers' Association, and the Bavarian Home Industry Association. Her work in the establishment of social courses eventually brought about the development of the Social-Charitable Women's School. In 1921 she was appointed as the chairperson of the German Catholic Women's Association's foreign commission, helping establish Catholic women's organizations in other countries.

In 1906 Von Montgelas was appointed as honorary president of the Patronage for Young Catholic Workers in the city of Nuremberg.

Von Montgelas, who had initially supported National Socialism, was an outspoken critic of the Nazi dictatorship, particularly regarding their treatment of women. She was particularly affected by the deportation of her friend Alice Salomon, a Jewish woman who was expelled from Germany. She firmly rejected government requests to join the Nazi Party and the League of German Girls, which resulted in her being blackmailed. She was accused of being of Jewish birth since her paternal uncle, Count Franz von Wimpffen, was married to a Jewish convert to Catholicism, Baroness Maria Anna Cecilia Bernhardine von Eskeles.

Von Montgelas is buried in the Montgelas family crypt in Egglkofen.

== Bibliography ==
Some of Von Montgelas' written works include:

- East Asian sketches, Munich, Theodor Ackermann, 1905
- Pictures from South Asia, Munich 1906
- Social Responsibility, in: The Christian Woman, 1907/1908, pp. 85–88
- For the Reform of the Waitress Profession, in: The Christian Woman 1909/1910, 354-357
- The Empire in: The Christian Woman 1933, pp. 278–284
