= Harriet Sundström =

Swedish artist (1872–1961)

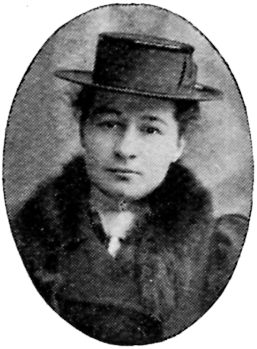
Harriet Sundström

Harriet Sundström (23 December 1872 – 28 April 1961) was a Swedish landscape artist.

== Biography ==
She was the younger daughter of Carl Rudolf Sundström (1841–1889) and Carolina Sofia Häggström (1849–1943), both of whom were educators. Her father was an ornithologist and doctor of zoology. Her mother was a journalist and foreign editor with Stockholms-Tidningen. She was the sister of Ellen Ammann (1870–1932), who became a co-founder of the German Catholic Women's Association.

Sundström studied at Tekniska Skolan in Stockholm, in Paris at Académie Colarossi with artists Franz Roubaud and Heinrich von Zügel, and with Charles Tooby in Munich. She was also a student for artist Anders Zorn.

She was part of the art-group "De Frie" and also created the organisation Originalträsnitt in 1911. She was vice president of the Grafiska Sällskapet from 1928 to 1937. Her art is on display at Nationalmuseum, Moderna Museet, Zornmuseet, at museums in Malmö and Norrköping, and also at Konstakademien. Harriet Sundström died in Stockholm in 1961. Harriet's work was always signed with "HS" or "H.Sundström".
