= Christiane von Preysing =

German benefactor (1852–1923)

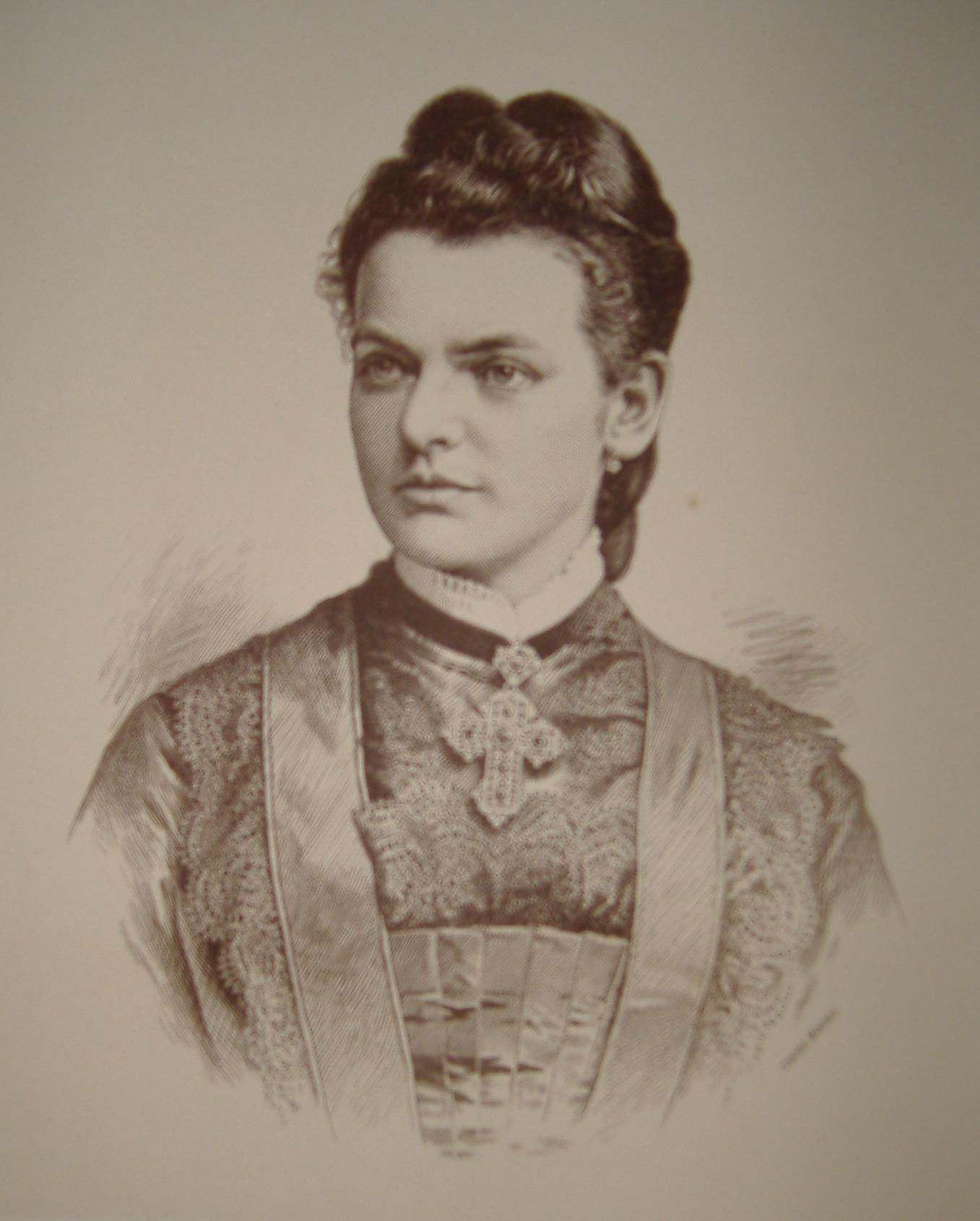
- Christiane Countess Preysing; archived in the Ida Seele Archive
- Born: 27 November 1852; Munich
- Died: 30 September 1923 (aged 70); Munich
- Known for: founder of the Marian Society for the Support of the Sisters of Mercy

Christiane Maximilian Countess von Preysing, née von and zu Arco-Zeinberg (born 27 November 1852 in Munich – died 30 September 1923 in Munich), was the founder of the Marian Society for the Support of the Sisters of Mercy and the first Catholic railway missionary.

== Life and work ==
She was the thirteenth and youngest child of Count Maximilian Joseph Bernhard von and zu Arco-Zeinberg and his wife Leopoldine, née Countess von Waldburg-zell-Trachburg. The Countess enjoyed the education customary for girls of her social standing at the time. She was educated privately and attended prestigious girls' boarding schools in Switzerland and Belgium. In 1878, she married Johann Conrad Count von Preysing-Lichteng-Mass. The couple had ten children.

The Countess received her initial inspiration for her involvement in the Seraph charity, founded by her priest, the Capuchin monk Cyprian Fröhlich. Looking back, the Countess wrote:

The spark of apostolic love that ignited this idea in her also lit a spark in our hearts: we did not want to be called upon as guardian angels to protect souls from harm, even if we could only save one person.

Together with Louise Vogt, Marie von Hohenhausen, Wilhelmine Angstrom, Pauline Kolb, Baroness Leopoldine von Schrenk, Baroness Franziska von Soden-Franhofen, and others, the noblewoman founded the Marian Girls' Social Service (today: IN VIA Catholic Girls' Social Work) in Munich in 1895 under the patronage of Our Lady, the Good Counselor. This newly founded organization supported and helped young girls and women in the city, protecting them from religious and moral dangers. The Countess was the first woman to head the association. She soon recognized the need for a railway board. Thus, in 1897, largely thanks to the efforts of Ellen Amann, the first Catholic railway board was founded in Munich, which provided care and support for women and girls traveling alone. In addition, the Countess supported Ellen Amann in establishing and expanding social and charitable educational programs for young women and girls.

In 1903, the Countess's husband died, and her suffering continued: in 1911, she lost her youngest son, and in 1913, her eldest son. During World War I, she lost two more sons, and shortly after, three of her daughters died. Her other son also died shortly after her death. Only two daughters survived their mother. His son, Johann Georg, married Princess Gondelinde of Bavaria as his second wife. The only son from this marriage, Johann Caspar, died in 1940 at the age of 21.

== Works ==
- The Litany of Loreto as a May Devotion, Regensburg 1918
- A Quarter Century of the Marian Girls' Protection Association in Bavaria, in: Bayerische Caritasblätter 1920, No. 5/6, pp. 33–39
