= Holy Cross Church, Münster =

Catholic church in Münster, North Rhine-Westphalia, Germany

Coordinates: 51°58′13″N 7°37′26″E

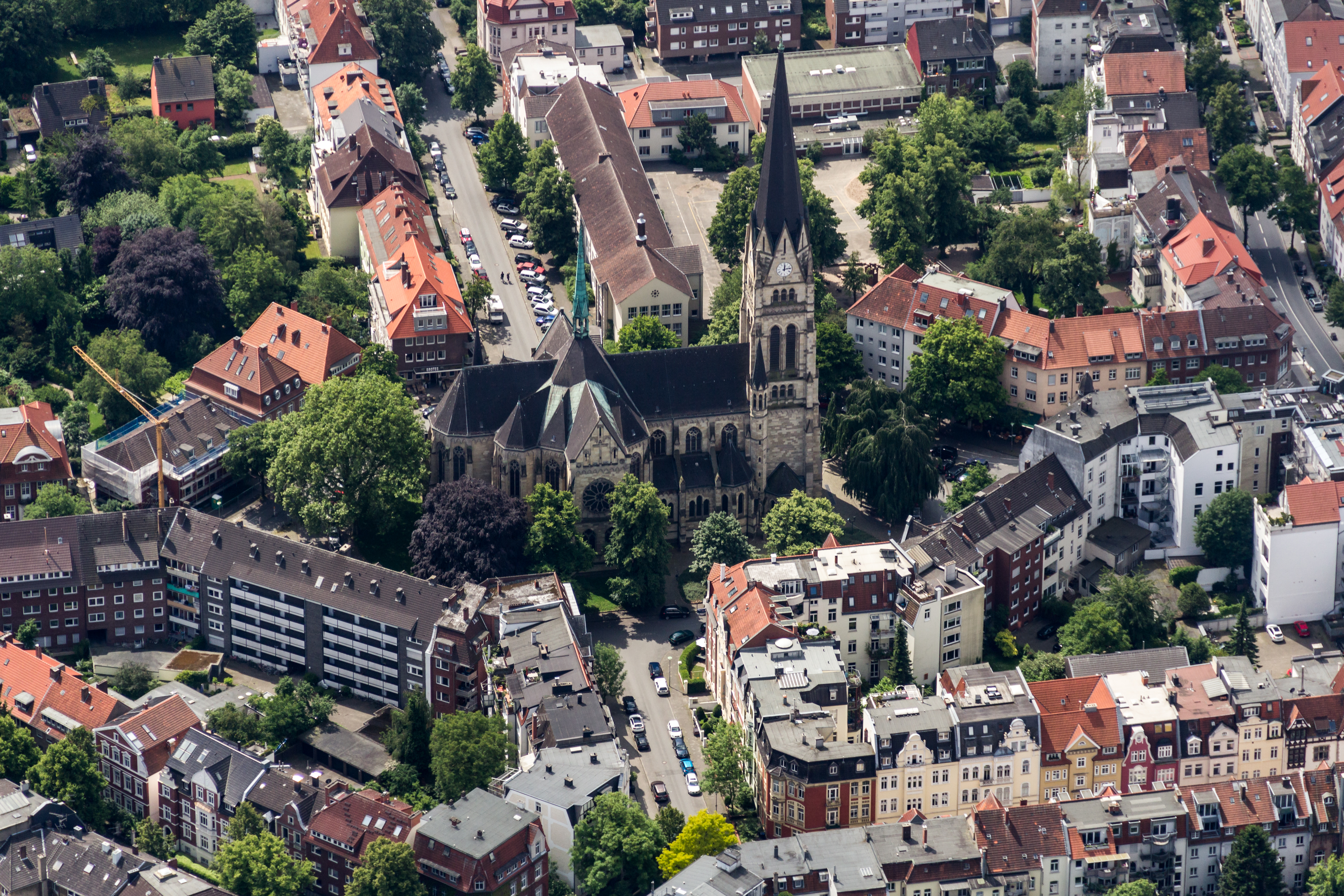
Heilig-Kreuz-Kirche in Münster

The Holy Cross Church (German: Heilig-Kreuz-Kirche) is a Catholic church in Münster, North Rhine-Westphalia, Germany. It is often also referred to as Kreuzkirche (transl. cross church).

== Architecture ==
The Holy Cross Church is a Gothic Revival Basilica on a cross layout. The crossing is expanded to a star shape and has a dragon rider on the elevated roof. The spire is 87 metres tall.

== History ==
The church was under construction from 1899 to 1902 after the plans of Bernhard and Hilger Hertel. First as a quasi-parish of the Liebfrauen-Überwasser community it was established as a parish in 1905. The spire was completed in 1908. Until the reconstruction of the Münster Cathedral after World War II the Holy Cross Church served as temporary cathedral. After his return from Rome the newly appointed cardinal Clemens August Graf von Galen celebrated on 17 March 1946 his first and only Pontifical High Mass. Just five days later the Pontifical High Mass was held for the suddenly deceased cardinal.

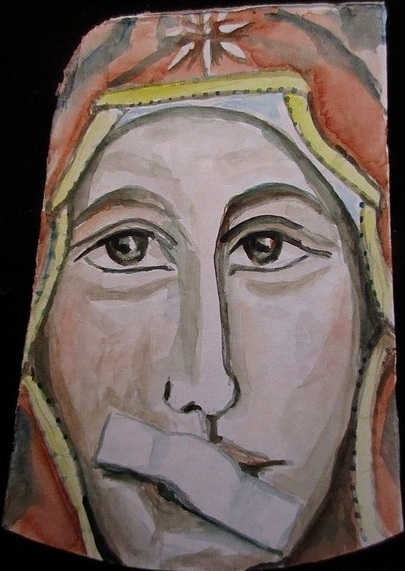
Icon of the Blessed Virgin Mary that was created for the Maria 2.0 movement.

In 2019, Holy Cross Church became a centre of the Maria 2.0 Movement.
