= Boyle Cross =

Historic monument in Frome, England

Coordinates: 51°13′52″N 2°19′17″W

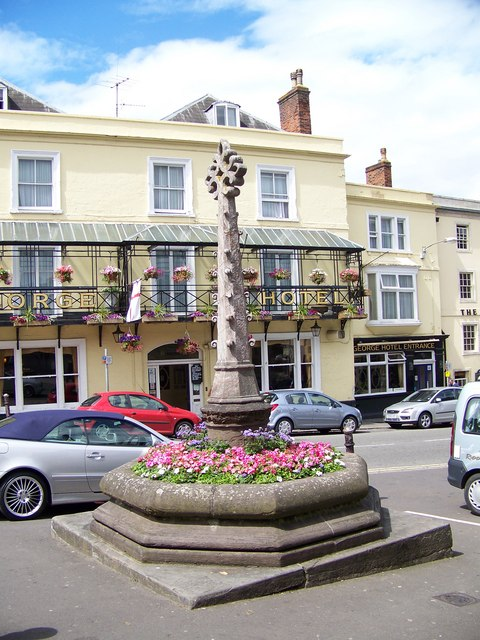
The Boyle Cross in 2008. It has since been restored as a fountain.

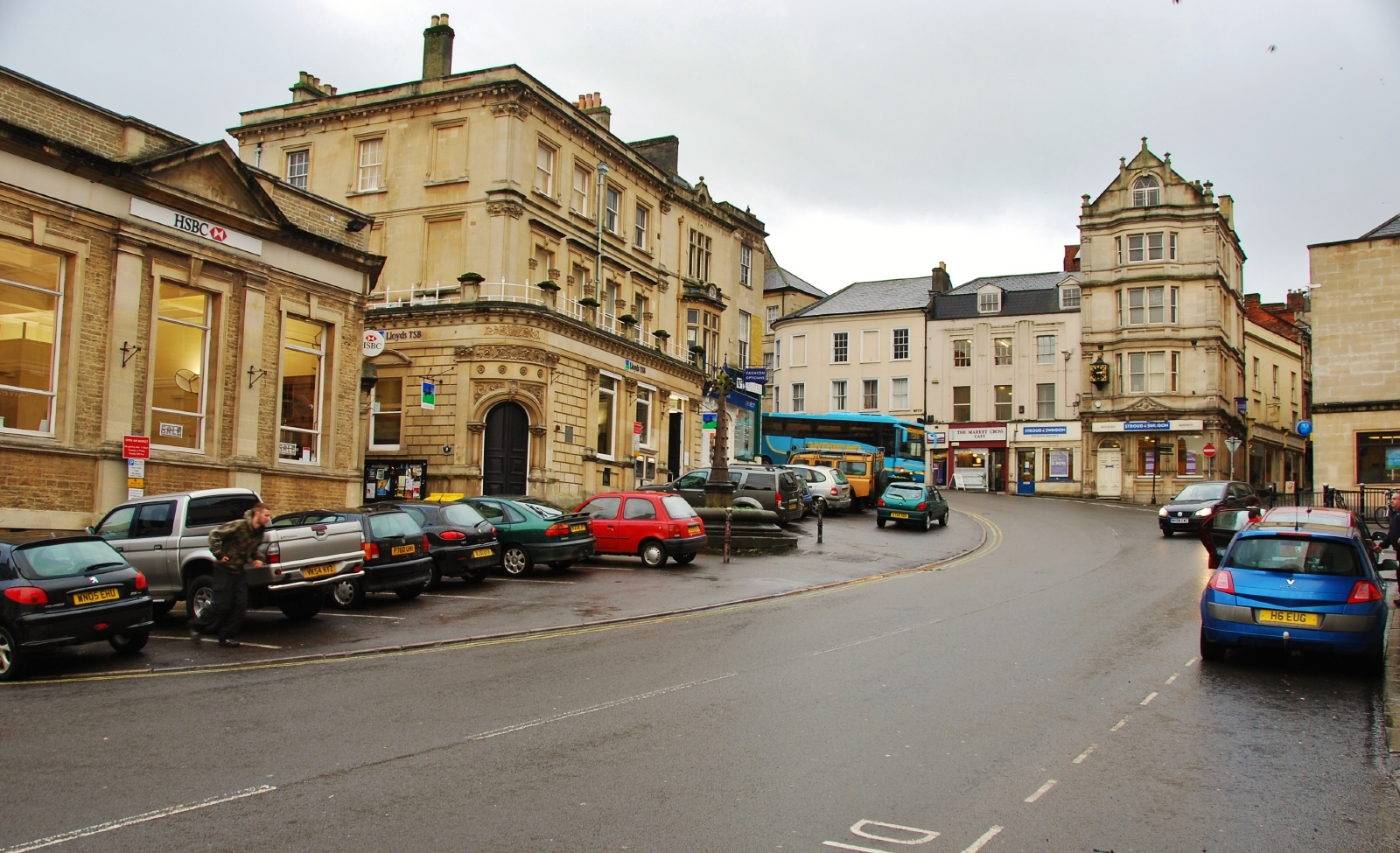
The Cross and surrounding buildings in 2011.

The Boyle Cross is a Grade II listed structure located in the town centre of Frome in Somerset, England. Directly across the road from the George Hotel, it functions as a market cross for the town. It was erected in 1871 and was designed by the Victorian artist Eleanor Vere Boyle, the wife of Richard Boyle, a chaplain to Queen Victoria who was by then rector of the nearby village of Marston Bigot. He was a descendant of the Anglo-Irish Earls of Cork, long-standing landowners in the area. It was sculpted of Devon marble and weighs approximately a ton. The land for the cross was donated by the Ninth Earl of Cork. Catherine Hill begins a little to the west of the Boyle Cross.

Originally designed as a fountain supplied by a channel running down from a well at the Church of St John the Baptist, this function has been restored in recent years.

== Bibliography ==
- Lassman, David. Frome at War 1939–45. Pen and Sword Military, 2020.
- Pevsner, Nikolaus. South and West Somerset. Yale University Press, 2001.
- Pickering, Andrew & Kearley, Gary. Secret Frome. Amberley Publishing, 2019.
