= Max Montgelas =

Bavarian general and diplomat

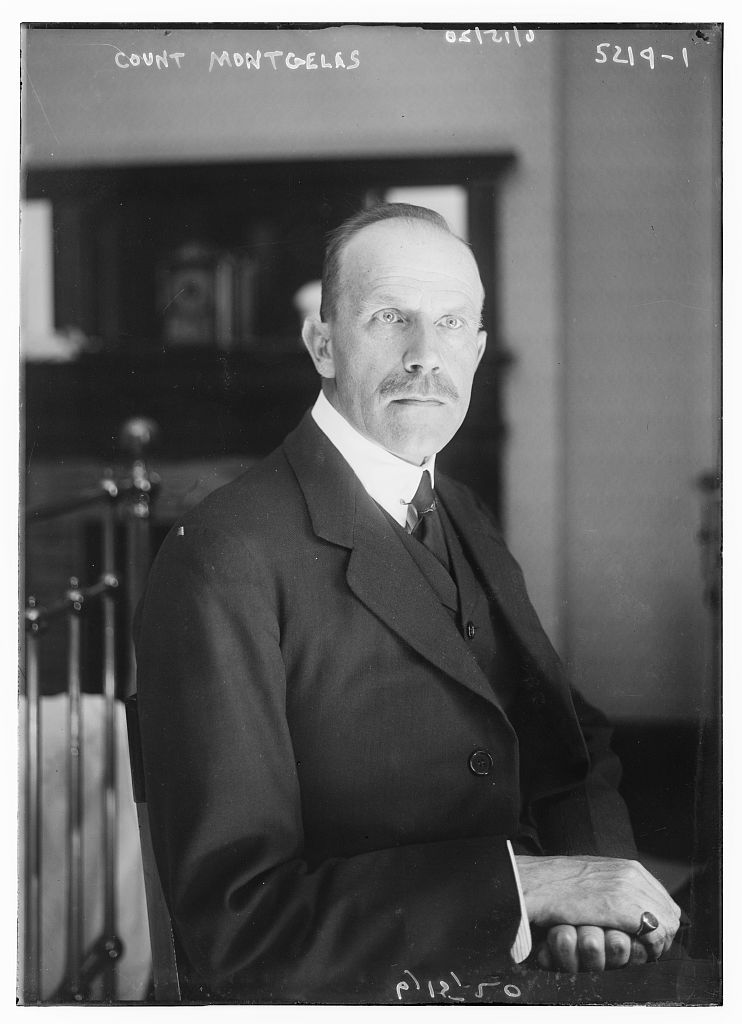
Montgelas in 1920

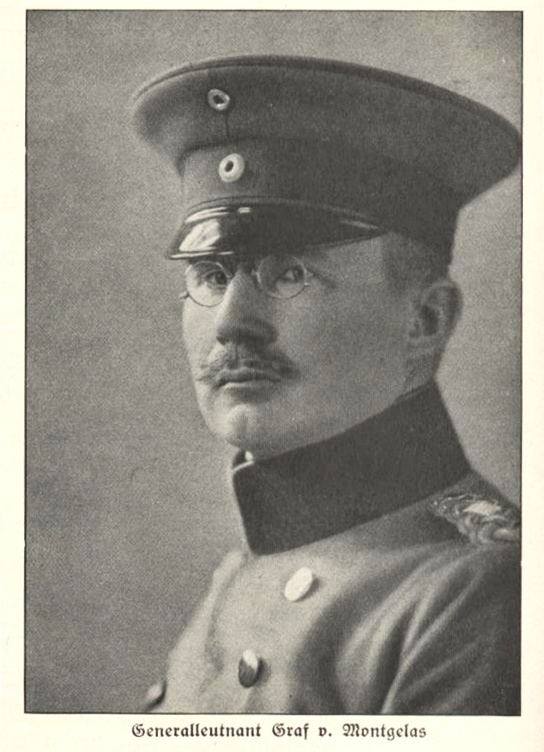

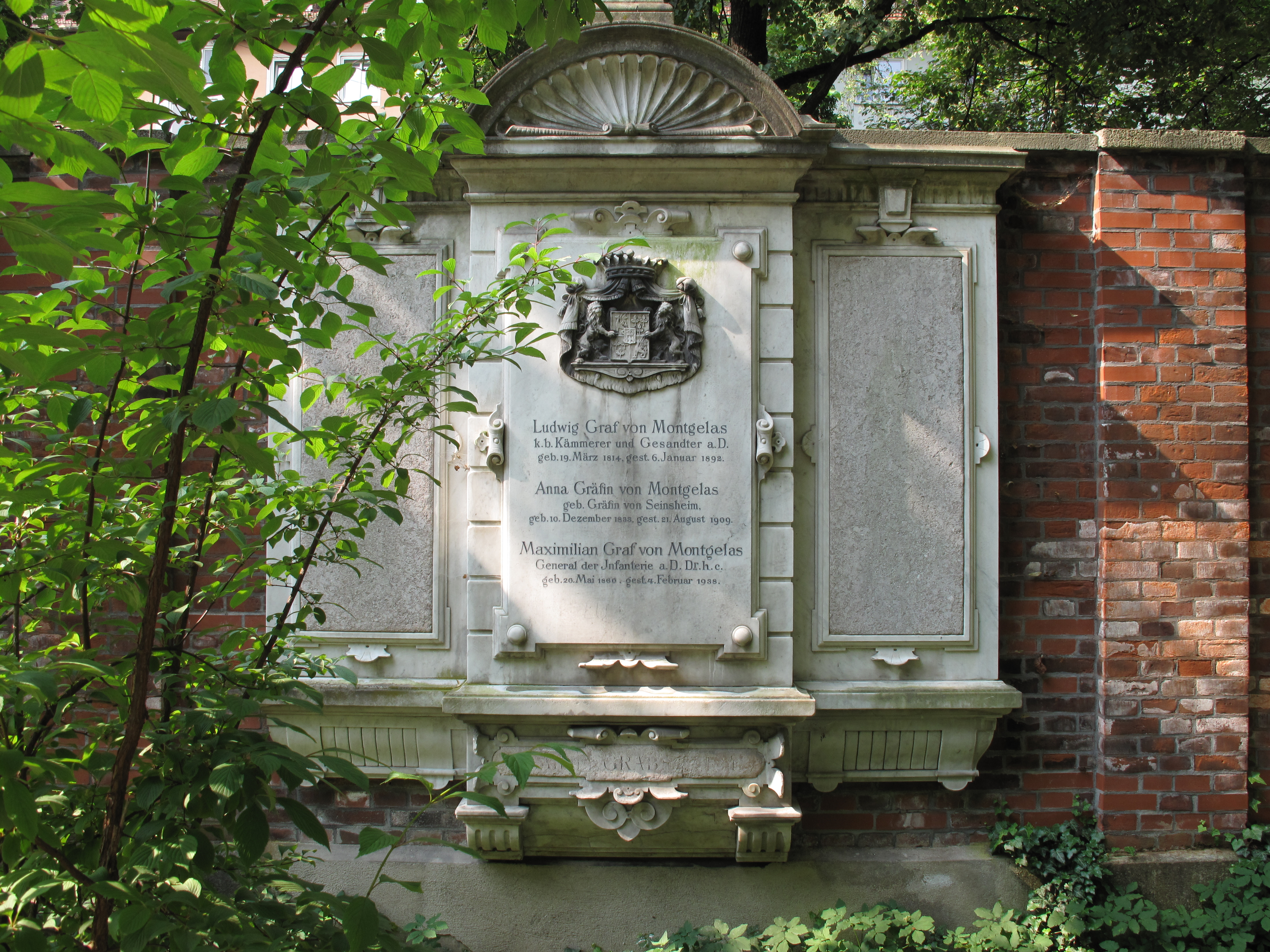
Montgelas' grave at the Alter Nordfriedhof in Munich

Count Maximilian Maria Karl Desiderius de Garnerin de la Thuile von Montgelas (23 May 1860 in Saint Petersburg – 4 February 1938 in Munich) was a Bavarian general and diplomat.

== Biography ==
The grandson of Maximilian von Montgelas, he joined the army in 1879, served in the Boxer Expedition and was military attaché in Peking from 1901 to 1902. In 1914, during the early phase of World War I, he commanded the 4th Bavarian Infantry Division but retired the following year to devote himself to careful study of the matters relating to the outbreak of the war and responsibility for it. In that capacity, he was official adviser to the Reichstag Committee of Enquiry.

During the German spring offensive of 1918 Montgelas contacted British intelligence regarding peace overtures. In October 1918 he also reported to a British agent that:

"The military situation is desperate, if not hopeless, but it is nothing compared to the interior condition due to the rapid spread of Bolshevism. Owing to this development, news of which has just reached me, nothing can save Germany but an immediate acceptance of an armistice and peace, no matter what the terms.

Montgelas was not thought by British intelligence to be working for the German government in making these statements, but thought credible as he was well-connected in Germany and the brother of a senior German diplomat.

He was married to Countess Pauline von Wimpffen.

He was a German count and the official spokesman for the German Weimar Republic at the Paris Peace Conference following World War I to investigate the question of responsibility for the war. He helped to draft the German answer to what they saw as charges of war guilt within the Versailles treaty, and was one of the four signatories to the Memorandum, presented in May 1919, in reply to the Western Allies. Later, in the absence of the other members of the German Commission, he was jointly responsible, with Delbrück, for a further Memorandum replying to the Allied Note of 16 June.

He subsequently wrote his controversial book The Case for the Central Powers: An Impeachment of the Versailles Verdict, published in London by George, Allen & Unwin Ltd., in 1925. The previous year he and Professor Walther Schücking had edited The Outbreak of the World War - German Documents collected by Karl Kautsky, commonly known as the Kautsky Documents, which were published by the Oxford University Press.

== See also ==
- Article 231
- War guilt question
