= George John Robert Gordon =

British diplomat (1812–1902)

George John Robert Gordon (4 March 1812 – 2 October 1902) was a British diplomat in South America and Europe who attracted attention in the 1870s for his marital situation. He also played a role in introducing the mediaeval song collection Piae Cantiones to a wider audience.

== Early life and career ==
Gordon was born in Maryculter, Aberdeenshire, on 4 March 1812, the oldest child of Alexander Gordon (an illegitimate son of the 3rd Earl of Aberdeen) and Albinia Elizabeth Cumberland.

He joined the diplomatic service in 1833 and served in various locations in South America and Europe. From 1842 to 1843 he was the British envoy to Paraguay and in 1850 he was the chargé d'affaires in Stockholm, where he was among a group of British residents who helped to set up regular Anglican church services. From 1853 to 1854 he was the British ambassador to Uruguay before serving as Minister Plenipotentiary to the Swiss Confederation from 1854 to 1858 and Envoy Extraordinary and Minister Plenipotentiary to the Kingdom of Württemberg from 1859 until his retirement in 1871.

== Piae Cantiones ==
On a visit to England in 1853, after his time in Sweden, Gordon presented a copy of Piae Cantiones, a collection of mediaeval songs published in Finland in 1582, to the Anglican clergyman and hymnwriter John Mason Neale. The songs were translated and published by Neale, in collaboration with Thomas Helmore, and include now well-known Christmas carols such as In dulci jubilo and Good King Wenceslas.

== Marriages ==
Gordon married Rosa Justina Young (1817−1891) in Rio de Janeiro in 1843 and had three children:

- Cosmo Frederick Maitland Gordon (1843−1884), a naval officer
- Alicia Albinia Georgiana Gordon (1845–1935), who married the Austrian army officer Count August von Dillen-Spiering
- Arthur John Lewis Gordon (1847–1910), a diplomat, who married his cousin Caroline Augusta Hamilton Gordon, daughter of Colonel Sir Alexander Hamilton Gordon

In the 1860s, Gordon began an affair with Emilie von Beulwitz (1841−1909). After he declared himself a bachelor and converted to Catholicism, they married in 1871, and were the parents of:

- Georgina Gordon (1866−1958)
- Robert Gordon (b. 1869)
- Richard Wolf Gordon (b. 1870)
- Louise Ignace Therese Julie Gordon (b. 1872)

After inheriting his father's estate at Ellon Castle in 1873, Gordon lived in Scotland before moving to the continent, residing first in Bruges in Belgium before settling permanently in Würzburg in Germany. In 1892, after his first wife's death, Gordon and his second wife were married in a civil ceremony in Maastricht in the Netherlands.

Gordon died in Würzburg in 1902, at the age of 90.

== Notes ==
Diplomatic posts
| Preceded by Sir Charles Murray | Minister Plenipotentiary to the Swiss Confederation; 1854–1858 | Succeeded by Sir Edward Harris |
