= Emmanuel Félix de Wimpffen =

French general

Emmanuel Felix de Wimpffen Baron
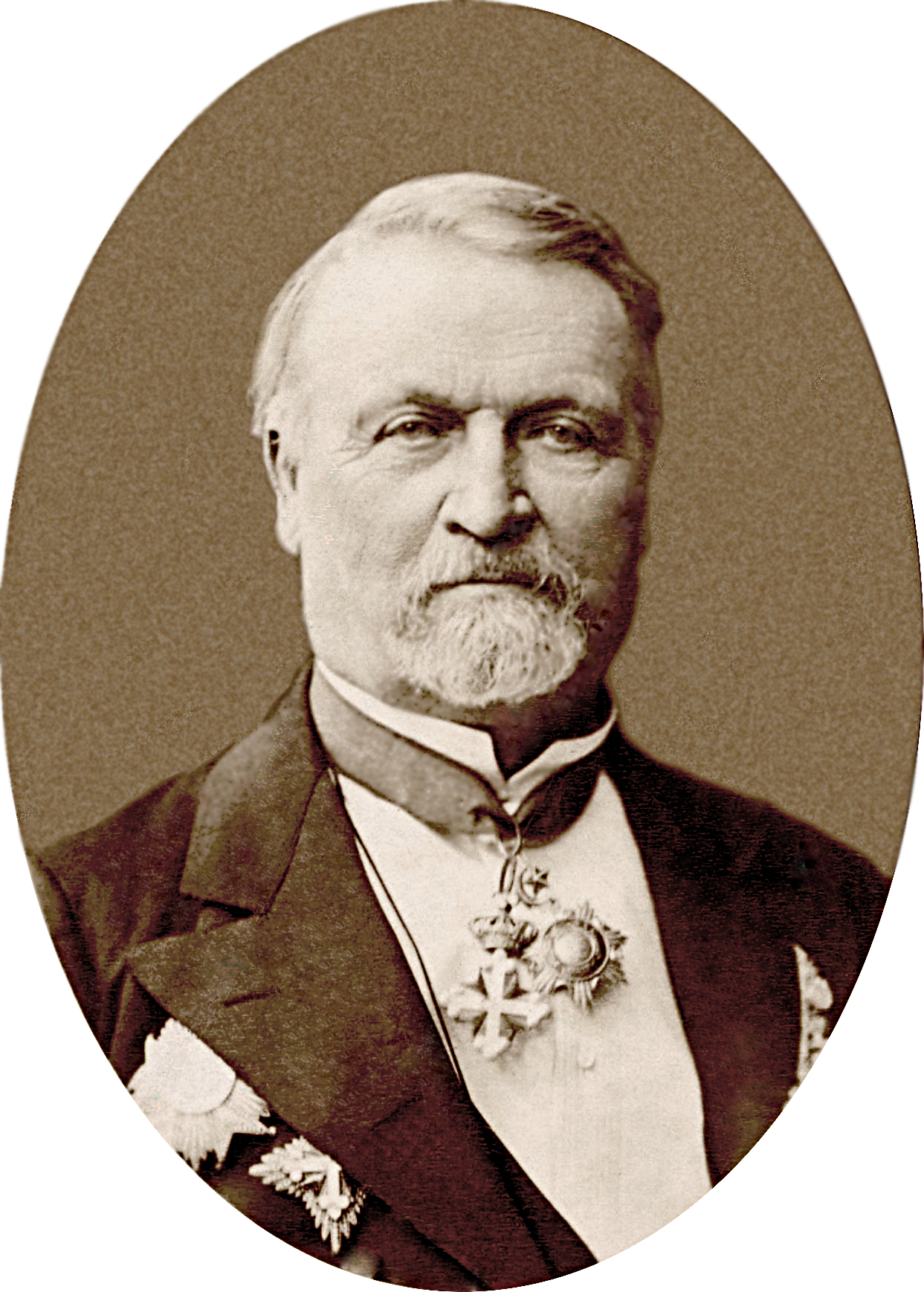
- Born: September 13, 1811
- Died: February 26, 1884 (aged 72); Paris, France
- Military career
- Allegiance: France
- Branch: French Army
- Rank: General
- Unit: Army of Châlons
- Conflicts: Battle of Sedan

Baron Emmanuel Felix de Wimpffen (13 September 1811 – 26 February 1884) was a French soldier and general.

== Biography ==
A member of the Wimpffen family, de Wimpffen was born in Laon, the illegitimate son of Baron Félix Victor Charles Emmanuel de Wimpffen by Cornélie Bréda. His father was a general in the French Army who had been created a Baron of the Empire in 1810. In 1836 he was recognized by his father.

Entering the army from the military school of Saint-Cyr, he saw considerable active service in Algeria, and in 1840 became captain; in 1847 chef de bataillon. He first earned marked distinction in the Crimean War as colonel of a Turco-Persian regiment, and his conduct at the storm of the Mamelon won him the grade of general of brigade.

In the campaign of 1859 he was with General MacMahon at the battle of Magenta at the head of a brigade of Guard Infantry, and again won promotion on the battlefield. Between this campaign and the Franco-Prussian War, he was mainly employed in Algeria, and was not at first given a command in the ill-fated Army of the Rhine. But when the earlier battles revealed incapacity in the commander of the 5th corps, De Wimpffen was ordered to take it over, and was given a dormant commission appointing him to command the Army of Châlons in case of Marshal MacMahon's disablement. He only arrived at the front in time to rally the fugitives of the 5th Corps, beaten at Beaumont, and to march them to Sedan.

In the disastrous Battle of Sedan on the first of September, MacMahon was soon wounded, and the senior officer, General Ducrot, assumed the command. Ducrot was beginning to withdraw the troops when Wimpffen produced his commission and countermanded the orders. In consequence it fell to him to negotiate the surrender of the whole French army.

After his release from captivity, he lived in retirement at Algiers, and died at Paris in 1884. His later years were occupied with polemical discussions on the surrender of Sedan, the responsibility for which was laid upon him.

He wrote, amongst other works, Sedan (1871), La Situation de la France, et les reformes necessaires (1873) and La Nation armée (1875).
