= Diocese of Astrakhan =

Diocese of Astrakhan Астраханская епархия
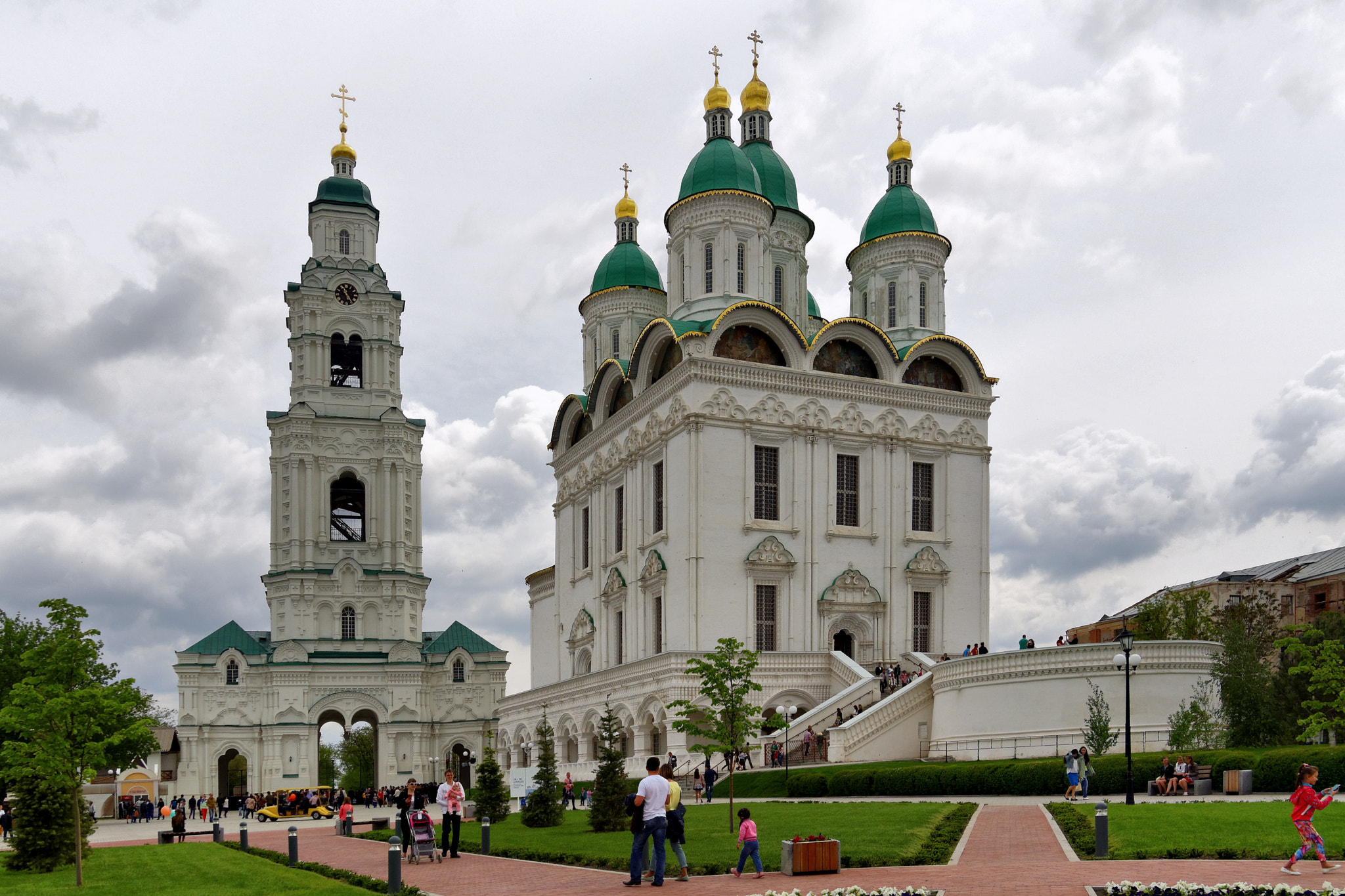

Location
- Deaneries: 10
- Headquarters: Astrakhan

Information
- Denomination: Eastern Orthodox
- Sui iuris church: Russian Orthodox Church
- Established: 1602
- Cathedral: Assumption Cathedral
- Language: Church Slavonic

Current leadership
- Governance: Eparchy
- Bishop: Nikon (Fomin) since July 15, 2016

Website
- astreparh.ru

Diocese of Astrakhan (Russian: Астраханская епархия) is an eparchy of the Russian Orthodox Church, uniting parishes and monasteries in the southern part of the Astrakhan Oblast (within the city of Astrakhan, as well as Volodarsky, Ikryaninsky, Kamyzyaksky, Limansky and Privolzhsky districts). It is part of the Astrakhan Metropolitanate.

== History ==
The diocese was established in 1602 under Tsar Boris Godunov and Patriarch of Moscow and all Rus', Patriarch Job after the petition of the abbot of the Astrakhan Trinity Monastery, Theodosius (Kharitonov) to separate it into an independent diocese from the vast Diocese of Kazan. The former superior of the Holy Trinity Monastery in Astrakhan, Theodosius (Kharitonov), became the first ordinary bishop. The rapid development of monasteries and church institutions in the region ensured the rights to control fisheries and the salt industry since the 17th century.

Archdiocese since 1605, metropolitanate from June 8/18, 1667 to April 3/14, 1714.

From 1991 to 2001, the number of parishes in the Astrakhan Diocese increased from 17 to 61. Compared to the same 1991, when 29 priests and 6 deacons served in the diocese, in 2001 there were already 60 and 13, respectively.

On March 12, 2013, by decision of the Holy Synod of the Russian Orthodox Church, the northern part of the Astrakhan region was separated from the diocese, on the territory of which the Akhtubinsk Diocese was formed.

=== Former names ===
- Astrakhan and Terek diocese (1602–1723)
- Astrakhan and Stavropol diocese (1723–1799)
- Astrakhan and Mozdok diocese (1799–1803)
- Astrakhan and Caucasus diocese (1803–1829)
- Astrakhan and Enotaevsk diocese (1829–1917)
- Astrakhan and Tsarev diocese (September 5, 1917 – 1943)
- Astrakhan and Stalingrad diocese (1943–1959)
- Astrakhan and Enotaevsk diocese (July 27, 1959 - March 12, 2013)
- Astrakhan diocese (since March 12, 2013)

== Bishops ==
- Theodosius (Kharitonov) (1602 - December 18, 1606)
- Onufry (February 15, 1615 - July 23, 1628)
- Macarius (January 13, 1629 - January 28, 1638)
- Raphael (May 17, 1638 - December 20, 1640)
- Pachomius (Borzunov) (June 17, 1641 - May 31, 1655)
- Joseph (May 4, 1656 - May 11, 1671)
- Parthenius (February 25, 1672 - October 5, 1680)
- Nikephoros (June 27, 1681 - October 28, 1682)
- Savvaty (March 4, 1683 - July 1, 1696)
- Sampson (February 2, 1697 – April 3, 1714)
- Joachim (Vladimirov) (January 22, 1716 - June 23, 1723)
- Lavrenty (Gorka) (September 6, 1723 - September 7, 1727)
- Varlaam (Lenitsky) (September 7, 1727 - June 7, 1730)
- Lev (Yurlov) (June 8 – October 2, 1730) did not arrive in the diocese
- Hilarion (August 15, 1731 - June 9, 1755)
- Methodius (Petrov) (May 10, 1758 - May 29, 1776)
- Anthony (Rumovsky) (August 27, 1776 - November 10, 1786)
- Nikifor (Feotoki) (November 28, 1786 - April 16, 1792)
- Tikhon (Malinin) (May 18, 1792 - November 14, 1793)
- Theophilus (Raev) (February 6 – March 11, 1794) was not in the diocese, the appointment was canceled
- Platon (Lyubarsky) (March 11, 1794 - August 18, 1805)
- Afanasy (Ivanov) (August 18, 1805) died on the day of his appointment
- Anastasy (Bratanovsky-Romanenko) (December 20, 1805 - December 9, 1806)
- Sylvester (Lebedinsky) (February 25, 1807 - February 10, 1808)
- Gaiy (Tokaov) (February 10, 1808 - February 20, 1821)
- Jonah (Wasilevsky) (April 26, 1821 - October 1, 1821)
- Abraham (Shumilin) (October 29, 1821 - May 7, 1824) According to the Church Gazette (1890)), - the first date is different: October 21, 1821)
- Methodius (Pishnyachevsky) (June 27, 1824 - September 30, 1825)
- Pavel (Sabbatovsky) (February 26, 1826 - February 7, 1832)
- Vitaly (Borisov-Zhegachev) (March 12, 1832 - December 4, 1840)
- Stefan (Romanovsky) (March 1, 1841 - December 4, 1841)
- Smaragd (Kryzhanovsky) (December 31, 1841 - November 12, 1844)
- Evgeny (Bazhenov) November 12, 1844 - April 15, 1856)
- Afanasy (Drozdov) (April 15, 1856 - April 6, 1870)
- Feognost (Lebedev) (June 27, 1870 - December 7, 1874)
- Chrysanthus (Retivtsev) (December 29, 1874 - December 8, 1877)
- Gerasim (Dobroserdov) (December 8, 1877 - June 24, 1880)
- Evgeny (Shereshilo) (June 26, 1880 - December 16, 1889)
- Pavel (Vilchinsky) (December 16, 1889 - November 21, 1892)
- Isaac (Polozhensky) (November 21 – December 19, 1892) was not in the diocese
- Pavel (Vilchinsky) (December 19, 1892 - November 13, 1893)
- Mitrofan (Nevsky) (November 13, 1893 - August 10, 1896)
- Sergius (Serafimov) (August 10, 1896 - April 13, 1902)
- Tikhon (Obolensky) (April 1902) supreme, Bishop of Nikolaev
- Georgy (Orlov) (April 27, 1902 - July 11, 1912)
- Innokenty (Kremensky) (1912) v/u, Bishop of Karevsky
- Feofan (Bystrov) (June 25, 1912 - March 8, 1913)
- Innokenty (Kremensky) (February 7, 1913 - March 2, 1913) v/u, Bishop of Karevsky
- Nikodim (Bokov) (March 8, 1913 - March 13, 1914)
- Filaret (Nikolsky) (March 20, 1914 - May 24, 1916)
- Mitrofan (Krasnopolsky) (July 6, 1916 - June 21, 1919)
- Leontius von Wimpffen (1918); supreme, Bishop of Tsarevsky
- Anatoly (Sokolov) (1919–1920) v/u, Bishop of Tsarevsky
- Palladium (Sokolov) (February - June 1, 1920)
- Anatoly (Sokolov) (1920–1922) high-ranking, deviated from Renovationism
- Thaddeus (Uspensky) (March 13, 1922 - June 27, 1927)
- Innokenty (Yastrebov) (June 1927 - May 22, 1928)
- Stefan (Gnedovsky) (1927–1928) v/u, Bishop of Enotaevsky
- Philip (Stavitsky) (June 13, 1928 - August 30, 1933)
- Andrey (Komarov) (October 28, 1929 - October 13, 1930), military
- Alexy (Orlov) (1930–1931) v/u, Bishop of Malmyzh
- Andrey (Komarov) (October 13, 1933 - April 27, 1939)
- 1939-1942 - not occupied
- Grigory (Chukov) (October 14, 1942 - December 1943) v/u, Archbishop of Saratov
- Philip (Stavitsky) (December 1943 - October 30, 1947)
- Nikolai (Chufarovsky) (October 30 – December 12, 1947) was not in the diocese, the appointment was canceled
- Philip (Stavitsky) (December 12, 1947 - December 12, 1952) 3rd time
- Gury (Egorov) (December 1952 - June 1953) v/u
- Leonid (Lobachev) (June 7, 1953 - February 9, 1954)
- Sergius (Larin) (February 9, 1954 - July 27, 1959)
- Gabriel (Ogorodnikov) (July 27, 1959 - September 15, 1960)
- Pavel (Golyshev) (September 15, 1960 - June 23, 1964)
- Jonah (Zyryanov) (July 5, 1964 - February 27, 1968)
- Pimen (Khmelevsky) (February 27 – July 30, 1968) supreme, Bishop of Saratov
- Mikhail (Mudyugin) (July 30, 1968 - December 27, 1979)
- Feodosius (Dikun) (December 27, 1979 - February 20, 1990)
- Filaret (Karagodin) (March 11, 1990 - October 20, 1992) from August 12, 1992, bishop of Dmitrov
- Jonah (Karpukhin) (October 25, 1992 - July 15, 2016)
- Nikon (Fomin) (since July 15, 2016)
