= Emy Gordon =

German writer and translator

Emilie Caroline Albertine Gordon (née von Beulwitz) (6 March 1841 − 2 February 1909), known as Emy Gordon, was a German writer, translator and Catholic activist who was married to the Scottish diplomat George Gordon.

== Family ==
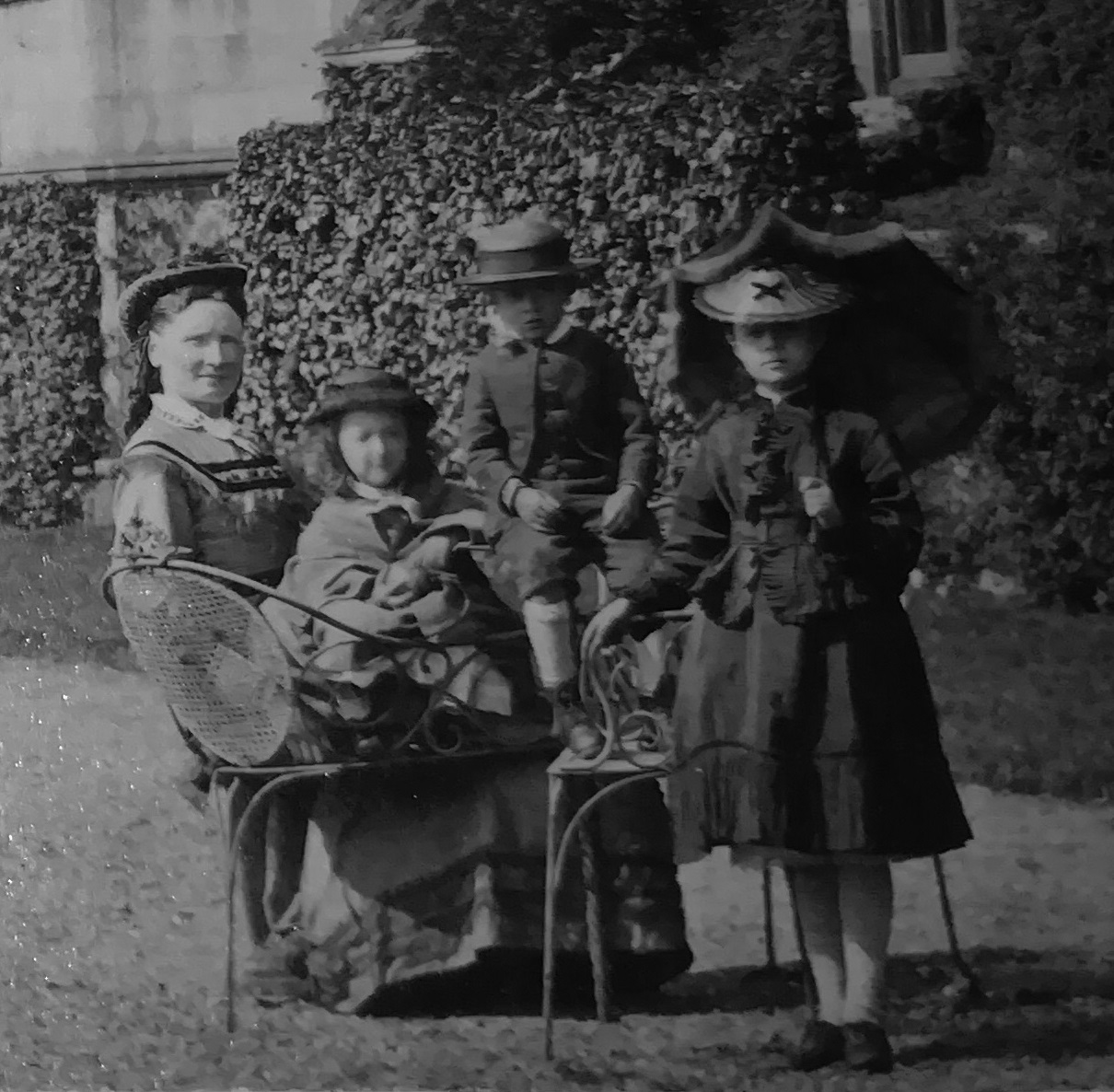
Gordon with her three eldest children at Ellon Castle in 1871.

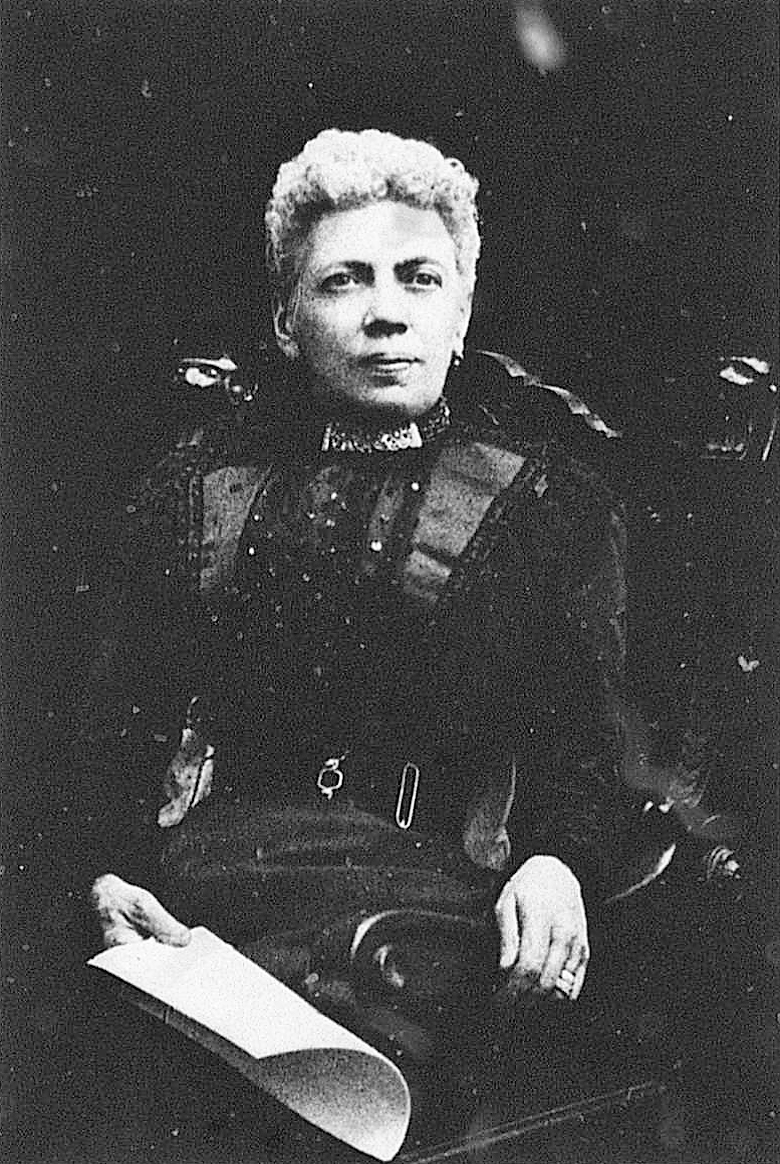
Emy Gordon in the early 1900s.

Gordon was born in Cannstatt, near Stuttgart, to Hartmund von Beulwitz (1814−1871), a Protestant landowner, and his Catholic wife Nanette Riedlinger (1808−1869).

In the 1860s she began an affair with George John Robert Gordon (1812−1902), a Scottish diplomat serving as Britain's Envoy Extraordinary and Minister Plenipotentiary to the Kingdom of Württemberg, who had been married to Rosa Justina Young (1817−1891) since 1843. Nevertheless, he declared himself a bachelor and converted to Catholicism, and married Emilie von Beulwitz in Manchester in 1871, causing a scandal.

Gordon and her husband had four children, three of whom were born before their marriage:

- Georgina Gordon (1866−1958)
- Robert Gordon (b. 1869)
- Richard Wolf Gordon (b. 1870)
- Louise Ignace Therese Julie Gordon (b. 1872)

After her husband inherited his father's estate at Ellon Castle in Scotland in 1873, the family lived there for several years before moving to the continent, residing first in Bruges in Belgium before settling permanently in Würzburg in Germany. She and her husband were married in a civil ceremony in Maastricht in the Netherlands in 1892, after her husband's first wife died.

== Writing and translation work ==
In her later years Gordon published a number of books on home and family life, the most popular of which was Die Pflichten eines Dienstmädchens, oder: das A-B-C des Haushaltes (1894), a guide to the duties of the housewife. She also edited Die praktische Hausfrau (The Practical Housewife), a supplement to the regional Catholic newspaper Fränkisches Volksblatt, and published articles in several Catholic magazines.

Gordon's translation work included the publication of a German version of Cardinal Manning's Why I Became a Catholic, Or Religio Viatoris.

== Catholic activism ==
In 1904 Gordon established a branch in Würzburg of the German Catholic Women's Association, a lay organisation founded the previous year in Cologne. She attended the Second Conference of the International Woman Suffrage Alliance in Berlin in June 1904, and was the opening speaker at the 1907 Katholikentag in Würzburg. In her home town she helped to set up other organisations providing social services to women and girls, and was president of the non-denominational women's education movement Frauenheil.

Some of her papers are held at the Ida-Seele Archive in Dillingen an der Donau.

== Selected works ==
- Allerlei Malverfahren. Anleitung zur häuslichen Kunstarbeit für Anfänger (1888)
- New fairy-tales: for children young and old (1889)
- Henry Edward Manning: Religio viatoris. Die vier Grundsteine meines Glaubens (1889, translation)
- Lose Blätter aus Märchens Sammelmappe (1890)
- Praktischer Ratgeber für Erwerb suchende Frauen und Mädchen aus besseren Ständen (1893)
- Die Pflichten eines Dienstmädchens, oder: das A-B-C des Haushaltes (1894)
- Praktische Anweisung zur Ölmalerei in ihren verschiedenen Arten für Anfänger und Dilettanten (1899)
- Die katholische Kindergärtnerin in Schule und Haus (1902)
- Historisch-kritischer Rückblick auf die Verhandlungen des Internationalen Frauenkongresses in Berlin vom 12.–18. Juni 1904: Fingerzeige für die katholische Frauenbewegung (1905)
