= Alexander Gordon (British Army officer, born 1781) =

- Born: 1781
- Died: 1873 (aged 89–90); Ellon, Aberdeenshire, Scotland
- Relatives: George Gordon, 3rd Earl of Aberdeen (father); Penelope Dearing (mother)
- Military career
- Allegiance: United Kingdom
- Branch: British Army
- Rank: Captain
- Commands: 15th The King's Hussars
- Conflicts: Napoleonic Wars; Peninsular War

Alexander Gordon (1781–1873) was a British officer during the Napoleonic Wars. He was commissioned a captain in the 15th Hussars and he fought in the Peninsular War. His correspondence during the Corunna Campaign were collated and published early in the 20th century.

== Biography ==
Gordon was the son of George Gordon, 3rd Earl of Aberdeen and his mistress Penelope Dearing. His commission was purchased for him in 1803. After service in the Peninsular War he sold his commission in 1811 on his marriage to Albinia Elizabeth Cumberland. He was acknowledged by the 3rd Earl as being his son and was provided for in the Earl's will. He died at Ellon in Aberdeenshire on 21 March 1873.

== Family ==
On 20 May 1811 Gordon married Albinia Elizabeth, daughter of Richard Cumberland and granddaughter of Richard Cumberland and George Hobart, 3rd Earl of Buckinghamshire. They had five sons and four daughters:

- George John Robert Gordon, JP, DL, of Ellon Castle, Aberdeenshire (1812–1912)m British diplomat in Sweden and Germany who married Rosa Justina Young and had two sons and one daughter:
  - Cosmo Frederick Maitland Gordon (b.1843), naval officer
  - Alicia Albinia Georgiana Gordon (1845–1930), married Count Ivan von Dillen von Spiering of Württemberg
  - Arthur John Lewis Gordon (1847–1918), British diplomat, married 1885 Caroline Augusta Hamilton Gordon, daughter of Colonel Sir Alexander Hamilton Gordon (1817–1890)
- Sophia Albinia Georgiana Gordon, (b.1813)
- Bertie Edward Murray Gordon (1813–1870), army officer who married Katherine Alicia Hacket
- Richard Louis Hobart Gordon (1815–1835), naval officer who drowned in the wreck of HMS Challenger
- Harriet Albinia Louisa Gordon (1816–1854) who married Charles Elphinstone-Dalrymple, son of Sir Robert Dalrymple-Horn-Elphinstone, 1st Bart., and had one son:
  - William Robert Elphinstone-Dalrymple (b.1854), army officer
- William Everard Alphonso Gordon, CB (b.1817), naval officer
- Catherine Louisa Caroline Gordon, (b.1819)
- Charles Alexander Boswell Gordon (b.1823), army officer who married Eweretta Rosa Johnstone
- Eleanor Vere Gordon (1825–1916), artist and author who married the Rev. and Hon. Richard Cavendish Boyle, son of Edmund Boyle, 8th Earl of Cork, and had three sons and one daughter:
  - Isabella Albinia Boyle
  - Hamilton Richard Boyle (b.1848), army officer
  - Charles John Boyle (b.1849), army officer
  - Algernon Edward Richard Boyle, JP (b.1854)

== Bibliography ==
H.C. Wylly, ed. (2009) [1909]. A Cavalry Officer in the Corunna Campaign, 1808-1809; The Journal of Captain Gordon of the 15th Hussars (reprint ed.). N&M Press. ISBN 978-1-84734-991-0. "This is a valuable eye-witness account of an often overlooked campaign by a perceptive and informed professional observer".
