= Wimpffen family =

Austrian noble family

Coat of arms of the Wimpffen family

The Wimpffen family is an old and distinguished Austrian noble family, originating in Württemberg, Germany.

== History ==
Originating in the Duchy of Württemberg, the family became prominent in the Kingdom of Bohemia during Habsburg rule, while its members held significant military positions throughout the Empire. On 8 April 1797, they were awarded the title of Count by Leopold II.

== Notable members ==
- Emmanuel Félix de Wimpffen (German: Emmanuel Felix Graf von Wimpffen; 1811–1884), French general
- Franz (Emil Lorenz Heeremann) Graf von Wimpffen (1797, Prague - 1870), Austrian general
- Maximilian von Wimpffen (1770–1854), Austrian general during the Napoleonic Wars
- Franz Graf von Wimpffen (1797-1870), Austrian general during the First Italian War of Independence
- Leontius (von Wimpffen) (1873-1919), Russian bishop murdered by the Bolsheviks
- Pauline von Wimpffen (1874-1961), German writer and Catholic activist

== See also ==
- Bad Wimpfen
- János L. Wimpffen (born 1950s, Graz), an American motorsport historian and writer of Austro-Hungarian descent
