= Mary 2.0 =

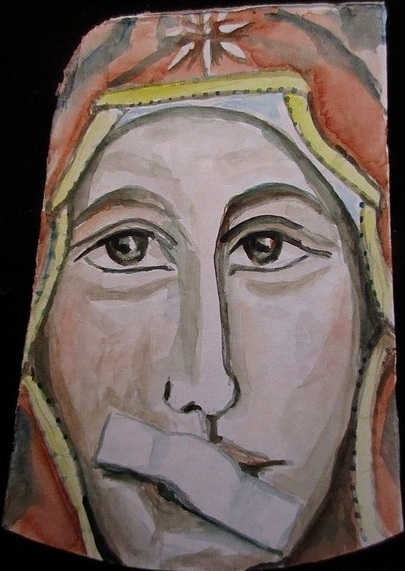
Icon of the Blessed Virgin Mary that was created for this movement.

Mary 2.0 (German: Maria 2.0) is a movement by Roman Catholic women in Germany to raise awareness of sexism, the mishandling of sexual abuse scandals, and other issues within the Catholic Church.

== Name ==
The name of the initiative was chosen since St. Mary was purportedly traditionally portrayed as the ideal silent and serving woman. As stated by Barbara Stratmann, a movement leader, "2.0 stands for a new beginning. Reset everything to zero. We are no longer like that."

== Demands ==
The group laid out its demands in an open letter to Pope Francis, which read as follows:

"We therefore call upon the Catholic Church, in accordance with many before us...

- to deny office to those that have harmed others or have tolerated or covered up such wrongdoings
- to surrender all offenders to secular courts and to cooperate in all prosecutions without restrictions
- to allow women access to all church functions
- to abolish mandatory celibacy
- to align churchly sexual morals realistically with the reality of life."

== Church strikes and activities ==
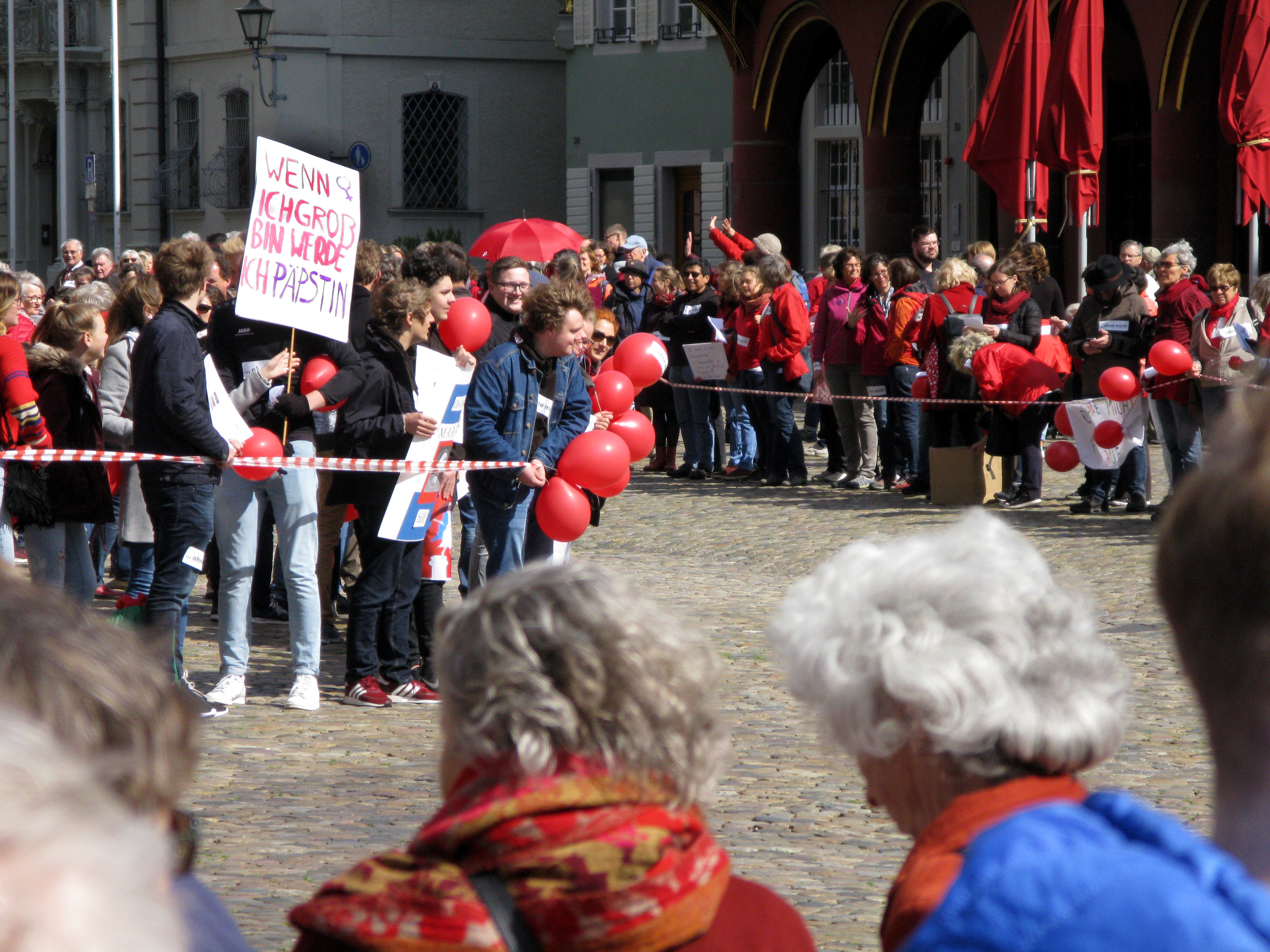
"When I grow up, I will become Popess."

The initiators asked all women to participate in a boycott during the May devotions to the Blessed Virgin Mary, which occurred May 11–18 in 2019. This boycott included women holding services outside their churches and refraining from all church-related voluntary work. In addition, church squares were covered with white sheets symbolizing "charity, sorrow, and a new beginning" to serve as a canvas for expressing complaints and demands in creative and emphatic ways.

At least 50 locations announced participation in the Mary 2.0 movement, and both women and men were participants. One such location was the Parish Herz-Jesu-Kirche (Essen-Burgaltendorf), where honorary active men joined the boycott. On Sunday, May 12, a vigil was held on the Münsteraner Domplatz, and 700-800 believers were gathered there.

== Preceding events ==
The origin of the movement was a reading circle in the parish of the Holy Cross Church in Münster. In early 2019, the group studied the first apostolic exhortation of Pope Francis, Evangelii gaudium. Major factors leading to the movement included women being unable to serve in all ministry positions and mandatory celibacy. The manner in which the Catholic Church sexual abuse cases were handled also led to the movement.

== Response ==
Support came from the Katholische Frauengemeinschaft Deutschlands (Kfd) and the Katholischer Deutscher Frauenbund (KDFB), which are large associations of Catholic women.

Catholic priests also voiced their support of Mary 2.0. In particular, Jörg Hagemann, the Dean of Münster, took part in a Liturgy of the Word mass in front of the church where he later held the regular mass with the Eucharist.

Franz-Josef Bode, the Bishop of Osnabrück and head of the subcommission women of the pastoral commission of the Deutsche Bischofskonferenz, welcomed the initiative, stating that while it is problematic that women left the Eucharistic communion and held their own ceremonies in parishes, one had to recognize that the profound injury to many active women in the church is behind this impatience: they don't feel the approval in the church as their commitment deserves.

Stephan Burger, the Archbishop of Freiburg, was sympathetic to women's denial of access to the deaconry and priesthood, but did not see any space for it in the Canon law of the Catholic Church.

Matthias Kopp, a speaker at the German Bishops' Conference, stated that change and discussion were necessary, but strikes were not the proper approach.

Critics of the awareness week included the archbishop Georg Gänswein, personal secretary to Pope Emeritus Benedict XVI., who warned against "creating a new church and tinkering around with its DNA." The Conservative Forum of German Catholics called for KDFB members who were "committed to the teaching of the Catholic Church" to depart the organization.

The Catholic Johanna Stöhr from the diocese Augsburg founded the initiative Mary 1.0, in order to "show that there are also women who are faithful to the teachings of the church." Her slogan is, "Mary doesn't need an update."

Peter Winnemöller believed that self invented services did not satisfy the Sunday obligation and that the boycott did not meet the requirements of a dispensation, therefore making the participants guilty of a mortal sin.

== Participation outside Germany ==
In addition to the participants in Germany, many women in Austria also joined the movement.

Women involved in the church in Switzerland organized their own boycott, which took place June 15–16 in 2019. In addition, they participated in the national women's strike on the 14th.

A group in Washington, D.C., joined forces by hosting an outdoor Mass near the Vatican Embassy on Massachusetts Avenue, called Mass On Mass. The liturgy was led by two women "priests" and attended by 75 people in the cold rain. The date of May 12 was chosen because it was both Mother's Day and Vocations Sunday.
