= Ellon Castle =

Castle-style country house in Aberdeenshire, Scotland

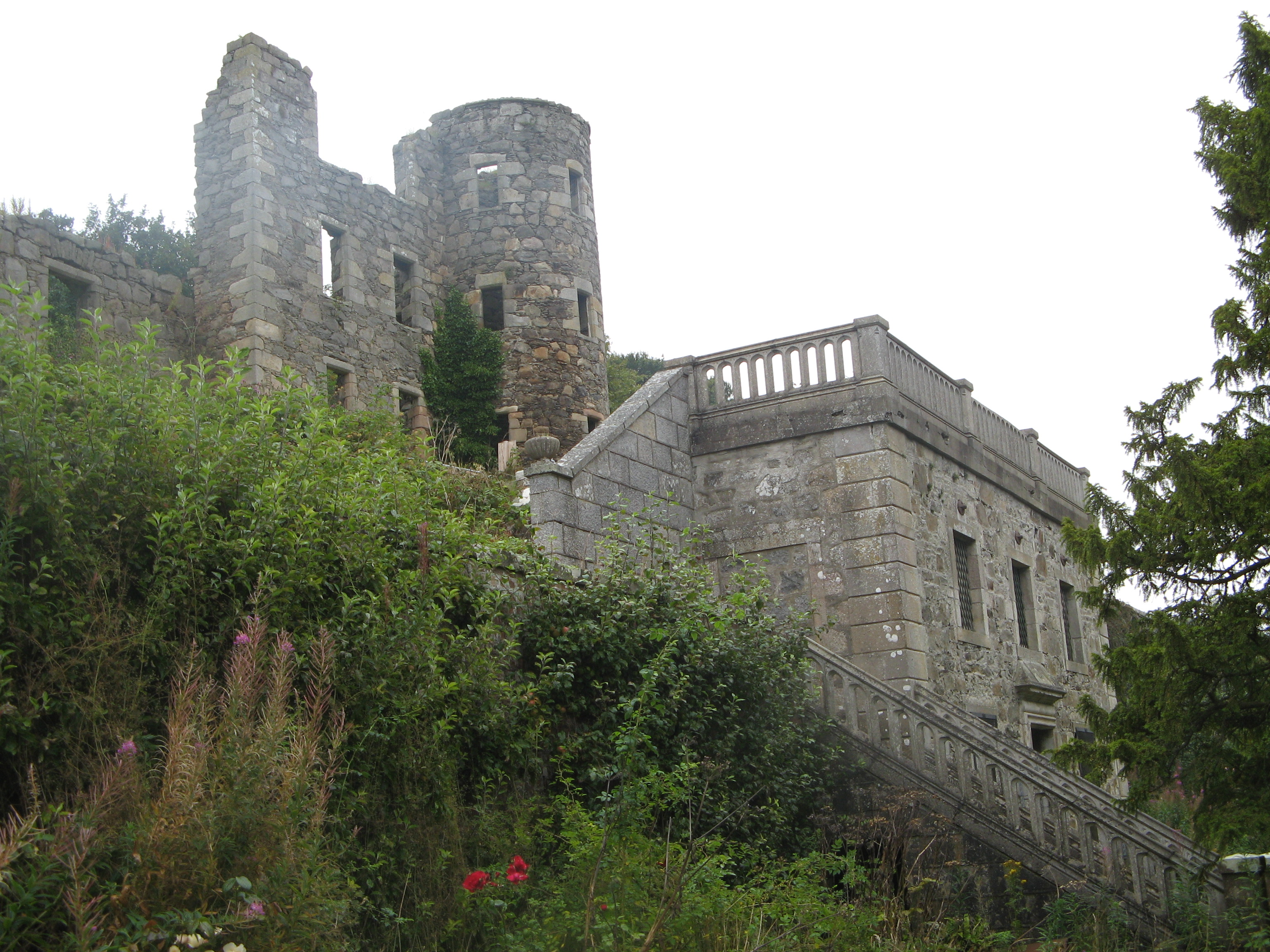
- Ruins of Ellon Castle

Location
- Coordinates: 57.366965°N 2.06803039°W

Site history
- Built: 15th century

Scheduled monument
- Official name: Ellon Castle (Old)
- Type: Secular: castle
- Designated: 2 September 1997
- Reference no.: SM7333

Ellon Castle is a scheduled monument within the town of Ellon, Aberdeenshire, Scotland. Only ruins survive of the structure dating primarily from the 16th century, incorporating elements from the 15th century and later 18th-century alterations. The ruins form a focal point within a formal 6-acre (2.4 ha) garden laid out in 1745, centred on a Category A listed sundial dating from c. 1700.

== History ==
=== Motte Castle ===
A timbered motte castle existed on a different site (Note: The site was recorded on an 1874 town plan as being opposite the New Inn on Market Street.) in Ellon. Later known as Moot Hill or Earl's Hill, the site dates back to the 13th-century rule of the Comyns. One of the principal seats of the Mormaers who controlled Buchan, the motte was used by Alexander Comyn as the prime centre to carry out legal affairs. Surrounded by a deep ditch, the level hill of earth was topped by a wooden tower containing accommodation for the family. A drawbridge prevented intruders gaining access to the timber staircase on the side of the slope leading to the palisade around the tower. Barns, stables and other ancillary structures were housed in another courtyard alongside it that incorporated the same protection measures. After Robert the Bruce defeated Comyn's son, John, at the Battle of Barra on 24 December 1307, there followed the Harrying of Buchan and Ellon was destroyed by fire; the earthen mound survived until it was flattened at the start of the 19th century. The downfall of the Comyns saw the ownership of the lands returned to the Crown which held them until gifted to Alexander Stewart, Earl of Buchan by Robert II of Scotland.

=== Old Castle ===
Land known as the Hill of Ardgith was sold by Isobel Moffat to Thomas Kennedy in 1413. Kennedy – sometimes spelt as Kynidy – had been appointed as hereditary Constable of Aberdeen by the Duke of Albany in appreciation for his actions during the Battle of Harlaw. A fortification was constructed at some point after the purchase date of the land and before 1500; originally known as the Fortalice of Ardgith, the castle was likely built by the Kennedy of Kermuck – sometimes recorded as Kinmuck – family and was used as their family seat. According to the archaeology historian W. Douglas Simpson the basement vault dates to the 15th century and pre-dates any later remains. The castle was reconstructed in the late 16th century that, according to Simpson, was undertaken by the masons John and Thomas Leiper, who were also responsible for work at nearby Tolquhon Castle, the House of Schivas and Castle Fraser.

A stone bearing the Kennedy arms is set into the ruins. Dated 1635, the marriage stone pictures a shield and bears the initials G. K.

=== Later history ===
In 1706 the site was acquired by Baillie James Gordon. In 1752 it was sold to the Earl of Aberdeen, who extended the castle to a U-shaped plan and allowed one of his mistresses to live there with their son, Alexander Gordon. After Gordon's death in 1873, the house passed to his son George, a retired diplomat, who lived there with his German wife Emy until moving to the continent in the 1880s.

The castle was later demolished and replaced by a mansion house, itself demolished in 1927. Today only the stable block bears the name.

== Garden ==
The centrepiece of the 6 acres (2.4 ha) formal garden is a facet head sundial. Dating from c. 1700, it is mounted on three steps and features twenty-four faces. It may have been erected as a memorial to Baillie Gordon of Ellon's two children who were murdered by their tutor, Robert Irvine, in 1717. The two boys were killed in Edinburgh after reporting that they had seen him with their mother's servant in a compromising situation.
