= Leontius von Wimpffen =

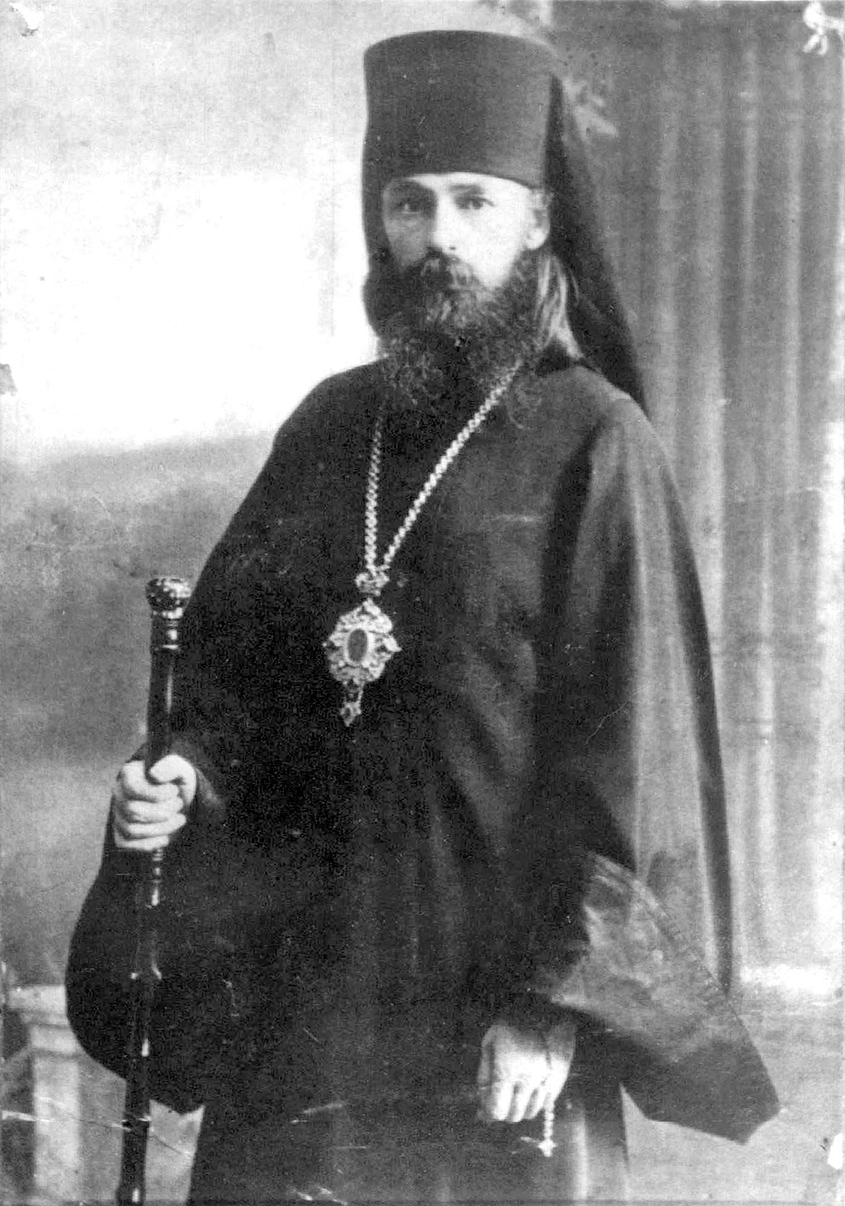

Bishop Leontius (secular name Vladimir Fyodorovich von Wimpffen, Russian: Владимир Фёдорович фон Вимпфен, born Baron Leopold von Wimpffen; 18 May 1873 – 6 June 1919) was a bishop of the Russian Orthodox Church, auxiliary bishop of Yenotayevka. He was killed during the Red Terror.

== Biography ==
Leontius was from a distinguished noble family, the Wimpffen. His father, Baron Theodore von Wimpffen, was a German citizen. His Mother, Lyubov Voyeikova, belonged to the families of the Moscow noblemen.

He was baptized in the Lutheran Church with the name of Leopold and in conscious age, influenced by his mother converted to Orthodoxy and took name Vladimir.

On 28 September 1914, was ordained bishop of Cheboksary, vicar of Kazan diocese.

From 12 February 1915, was Bishop of Yerevan (Armenia), vicar of the Georgian exarchate.

From 24 March 1916, was Bishop of Kustanai, vicar Orenburg diocese.

From 16 December 1916 he became Bishop of Petrovsk, vicar of Saratov diocese.

Came into conflict with the ruling bishop Palladius (Dobronravov). May 5, 1917 was dismissed with the appointment of his seat in the Astrakhan Pokrovo-Boldinsky monastery.

From 5 September 1917, was Bishop of Enotaevka, vicar of Diocese of Astrakhan.

On 26 September 1918 Bishop Leontius was retired.

On 7 June 1919, by order of Sergey Kirov, he was arrested and charged (along with Archbishop Mitrophan of Astrakhan) with organization of the White Guard conspiracy. Shot 23 June 1919 in one day with Archbishop Mitrophan. It is known that they met before the execution. Bishops, in the face of impending death, forgot all his previous wrongs, asked each other for forgiveness, bowed to each other to the ground and embraced. They were thrown into a hole, and refused a burial.
