= George Gordon, 3rd Earl of Aberdeen =

3rd Earl of Aberdeen from 1745 to 1801

George Gordon, 3rd Earl of Aberdeen (19 June 1722 – 13 August 1801), styled Lord Haddo until 1745, was a Scottish peer.

He sat in the House of Lords as a Scottish representative peer from 1747 to 1761, and from 1774 to 1790. He was against William Pitt the Younger's Regency Bill.

== Family ==
Aberdeen was the son of William Gordon, 2nd Earl of Aberdeen, by his second wife Lady Susan, daughter of John Murray, 1st Duke of Atholl.

Lord Aberdeen married Catherine Elizabeth Hanson (ca 1730-March 1817 Rudding Park House), daughter of Oswald Hanson, in 1759; they had six children. According to recent sources, she was the cook at the Stafford Arms in Wakefield, and a handsome woman of 29. She apparently blackmailed him into marriage with a loaded pistol after he had seduced her:

- Lady Catherine Gordon (died 30 September 1784)
- Lady Anne Gordon, who married Edward Place on 5 July 1787, taking his last name
- Lady Susan Gordon (died 26 July 1795)
- Lady Mary Gordon (died August 1852)
- George Gordon, Lord Haddo (28 January 1764 – 2 October 1791 of a fall from his horse at Gight Castle), who was the father of Prime Minister George Hamilton-Gordon, 4th Earl of Aberdeen, two other sons, and three daughters.
- Hon. William Gordon (c. 1765 – 19 March 1845) Built Rudding Park House 1805–1824.

Lord Aberdeen, known as the "Wicked Earl" for his exploitation of his tenantry through 19-year-leases as well as his private life, also had children by at least three mistresses:

- (by his London housekeeper Mrs Forest) John Gordon, who was born at Cairnbulg Castle, near Fraserburgh
- (by an unknown woman) Charles Gordon, who was born at Wiscombe Park, in Devon
- (by Penelope Dering, a lady from Sussex) a son (Alexander Gordon) and daughter, who were born at Ellon Castle.

Lord Aberdeen died in August 1801, aged 79. The Countess of Aberdeen died at Rudding Park in March 1817.

Peerage of Scotland
Preceded by William Gordon	Earl of Aberdeen; 1745–1801	Succeeded by George Hamilton-Gordon
