= Ellen Ammann =

German politician and activist

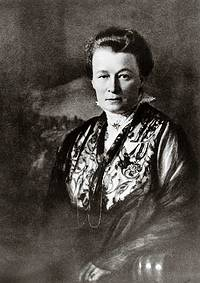
- Ellen Sundström Ammann
- Born: Ellen Aurora Elisabeth Morgenröte Ammann née Sundström; 1 July 1870; Stockholm, Sweden
- Died: 23 November 1932 (aged 62); Munich, Germany

Ellen Aurora Ammann (1 July 1870 – 23 November 1932) was a German politician and activist of Swedish origin, a representative of the Bavarian People's Party.

From 1919 to 1932, she served as Landtag deputy for the Bavarian People’s Party, where she advocated the professionalisation of women's education. In January 1923, together with Anita Augspurg, Lida Gustava Heymann and a delegation of women, Amman called for Austrian-born Adolf Hitler to be expelled from Germany. During the Beer Hall Putsch, she and several members of government hastily composed a condemnation of the attempted coup d'état. She continued to oppose National Socialism until her death.

== Life ==
Ellen Sundström was born in Stockholm, Sweden. She was the elder daughter of Carl Rudolf Sundström (1841–1889) and Carolina Sofia Häggström (1849–1943). Her father was an ornithologist and doctor of zoology. Her mother was a journalist and foreign editor with Stockholms-Tidningen. She was the sister of Swedish landscape artist Harriet Sundström (1872–1961) .

Ellen, who was baptized a Protestant, was brought up in the spirit of the Catholic Church by her mother, who secretly converted to the Catholic faith in Denmark in 1881. Her parents made it possible for her to attend the Franska skolan (French school), intended for children of diplomats, where religious sisters, the Sœurs de Saint-Joseph de Chambéry, taught. At the age of 14, Ellen Ammann converted to the Roman Catholic Church. After graduating from high school, she went on a long trip to Germany with her mother. For almost a year she was the guest of Clemens Heereman von Zuydwyck and his family at Surenburg Castle near Riesenbeck.

After returning to Sweden, she studied Swedish remedial gymnastics, the founder of which is Pehr Henrik Ling. Ellen Sundström did not complete her studies because she fell in love with the German orthopedist Ottmar Ammann, who was staying in Stockholm for further training in this same therapeutic gymnastics and who lived with the Sundström family as a sublet. They married in October 1890 and 20-year-old Ellen Ammann moved to Munich with her husband. Six children were born to the couple. The eldest son Albert Maria (1892–1974) was ordained a Catholic priest, church and art historian. His brothers also made careers as merchants in the USA, Hong Kong and Shanghai.

Ellen Ammann soon got involved in charitable work. In 1895, she was a co-founder of the Marian Association for the Protection of Girls. Two years later, with the support of Countess Christiane von Preysing-Lichtenegg-Moos, she founded the first Catholic station mission in Munich, which she led for more than two decades. She was also actively involved in founding the Munich branch of the Catholic Women's League, which she chaired on December 6, 1904. In 1911 she founded the Bavarian state association of the Catholic Women's League.

Ellen Ammann recognized very soon that "besides the women's school, which concludes the higher girls' school, special female educational institutions should be set up that provide models for the social and charitable work of paid or honorary social workers and assistants in this area". Until her death, she taught the subject "Women's Questions and Women's Movement" once a week. The educational institution founded by Ellen Ammann was one of the first programmatic training centers for social work in Germany. Her daughter Maria Ammann headed the social women's school from 1929 to 1961, which was integrated into what is now the Catholic University of Applied Sciences in Munich in July 1970.

In 1914, Ellen Amman was awarded the papal order Pro Ecclesia et Pontifice for her social and charitable commitment. In 1919 she founded the Association of Catholic Women Deacons (today: Secular Institute Ancillae Sanctae Ecclesiae), whose original impulse goes back to the idea of the so-called "third women's profession".

After the introduction of women's suffrage in November 1918, Ellen Ammann was one of the first women to be elected to the Bavarian State Parliament for the Bavarian People's Party in 1919, of which she was a member until 1932. She represented the areas of youth welfare, health care, public welfare and welfare in the Bavarian state parliament.

She viewed with particular concern the increasing strength of National Socialism, whose danger she recognized from the start. In the spring of 1923, she tried to get Adolf Hitler expelled from Bavaria. She was instrumental in the suppression of the Hitler putsch of November 9, 1923. After she found out about the planned march to the Feldherrnhalle, she gathered all members of the government who could be reached at her school. In a resolution to the Bavarian people, the putsch was condemned as a state crime. Ammann made sure that people who were in danger could get to safety and that Reichswehr units were transferred to Munich.

Immediately after a speech in Parliament about help for large families, Ellen Ammann died in Munich during 1932 in the aftermath of a stroke. She was buried at Alter Südfriedhof.

== See also ==
- List of Bavarian People's Party politicians

== Other sources ==
- Adelheid Schmidt-Thomé (2020) Ellen Ammann: Frauenbewegte Katholikin (Verlag Friedrich Pust) ISBN 9783791761695
- Gunda Holtmann (2017) Ellen Ammann – Eine intellektuelle Biographie (Nomos Verlagsgesellschaft mbH & Co) ISBN 978-3956502705
- Marianne Neboisa (1992) Ellen Ammann, geb. Sundström 1870-1932. Dokumentation und Interpretation eines diakonischen Frauenlebens. (St. Ottilien) ISBN 978-3880962804
- Manfred Berger (2002). "Ammann, Ellen Aurora Elisabeth Morgenröte". In Bautz, Traugott (ed.). Biographisch-Bibliographisches Kirchenlexikon (BBKL) (in German). Vol. 20. Nordhausen: Bautz. col. 27–34. ISBN 3-88309-091-3.
- Manfred Berger: Frauen in sozialer Verantwortung: Ellen Ammann. In: Unsere Jugend. 59 2007/H.4, S. 176-179
