= Bezbozhnik =

Bezbozhnik may refer to:

- Bezbozhnik (magazine), a Soviet satirical magazine
- Bezbozhnik (newspaper), a Soviet anti-religious and atheistic newspaper
- Bezbozhnik (rural locality), name of several rural localities in Russia

== See also ==
- Bezbozhnik u Stanka, a Soviet satirical magazine
