= Bezbozhnik (magazine) =

Soviet llustrated magazine (1925–1941)

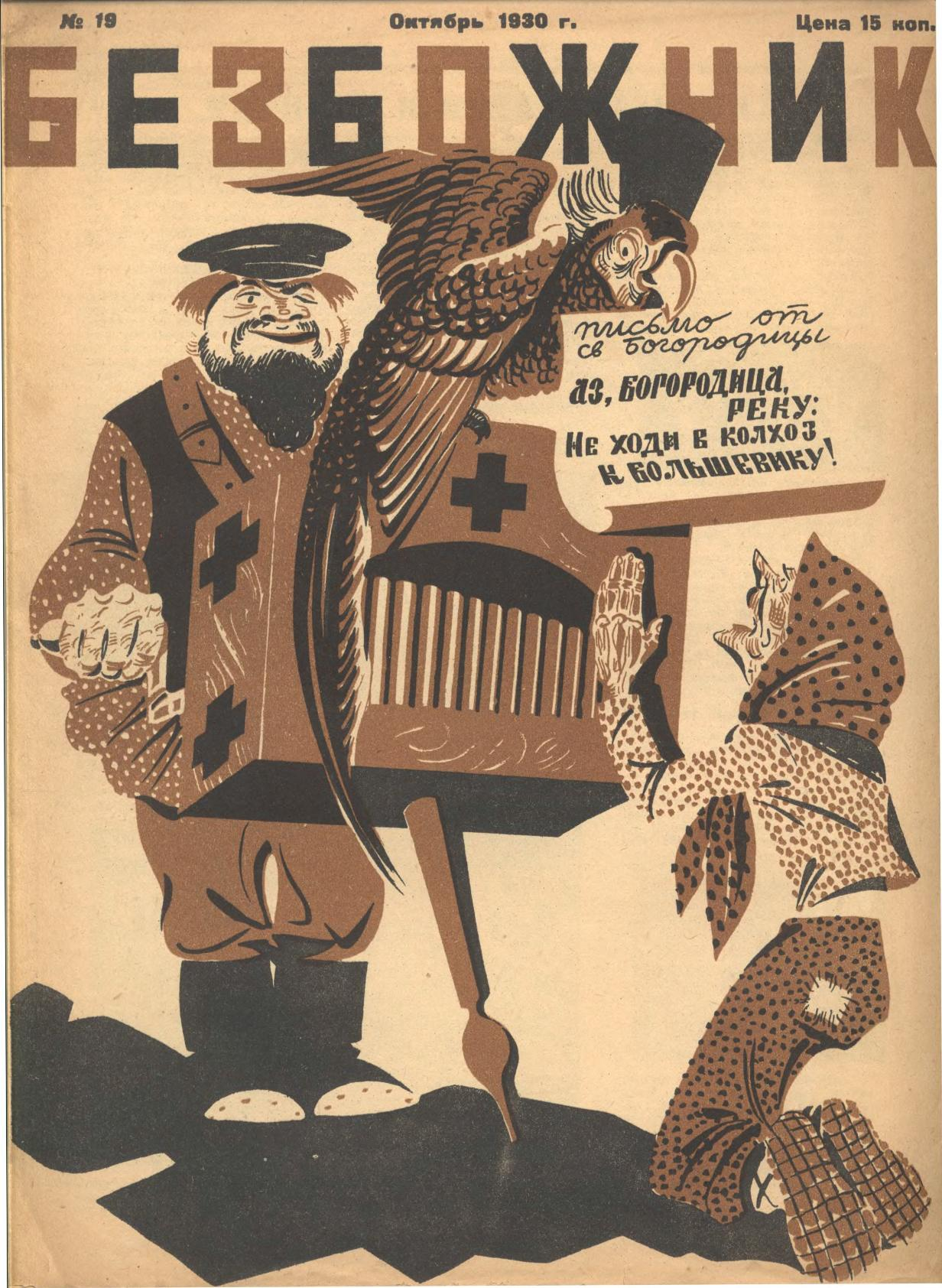
- Cover of the magazine «Bezbozhnik» 1930, No. 19. A kulak with a barrel organ is depicted, in front of him is a peasant woman kneeling. On the barrel organ is a priest in the image of a parrot with a note that says: «Letter from the Holy Virgin. I, the Virgin, say: do not go to kolkhoz of the Bolsheviks».
- Editor: Y. M. Yaroslavsky, F. M. Putintsev
- Categories: antireligious
- Frequency: Monthly
- Founded: March, 1925
- Final issue: June, 1941
- Country: Soviet Union/Russia
- Based in: Moscow
- Language: Russian

Bezbozhnik (Russian: «Безбожник», IPA: [bʲɪzˈboʐnʲɪk], lit. 'The Atheist') was an illustrated magazine, an organ of the Centre Soviet and Moscow Oblast Soviet of the League of the Militant Godless.

The magazine was published in Moscow from March 1925 to June 1941. From 1926 to 1932, the magazine was published twice a month. In other years, the magazine was published once a month. From 1925 to 1932, the editor-in-chief of the magazine was Y. M. Yaroslavsky. From 1933 to 1941, the editor-in-chief of the magazine was F. M. Putintsev. The magazine was designed for the mass working reader. On its pages articles, essays, fictional works were printed. The magazine criticized religion from the point of view of Marxism. In addition, the magazine covered the experience of the atheistic work of the cells of the League of the Militant Godless. The magazine included works by cartoonists N. F. Denisovsky, M. M. Cheremnykh, D. S. Moor, K. S. Eliseev and others. The circulation of the magazine Bezbozhnik reached 200 thousand copies.

== See also ==
- Bezbozhnik (newspaper)
- Bezbozhnik u Stanka
- Derevenskiy Bezbozhnik
- Council for Religious Affairs
- Persecutions of the Catholic Church and Pius XII
- Persecution of Christians in the Soviet Union
- Persecution of Muslims in the Soviet Union
- Religion in the Soviet Union
- State atheism
- USSR anti-religious campaign (1928–1941)

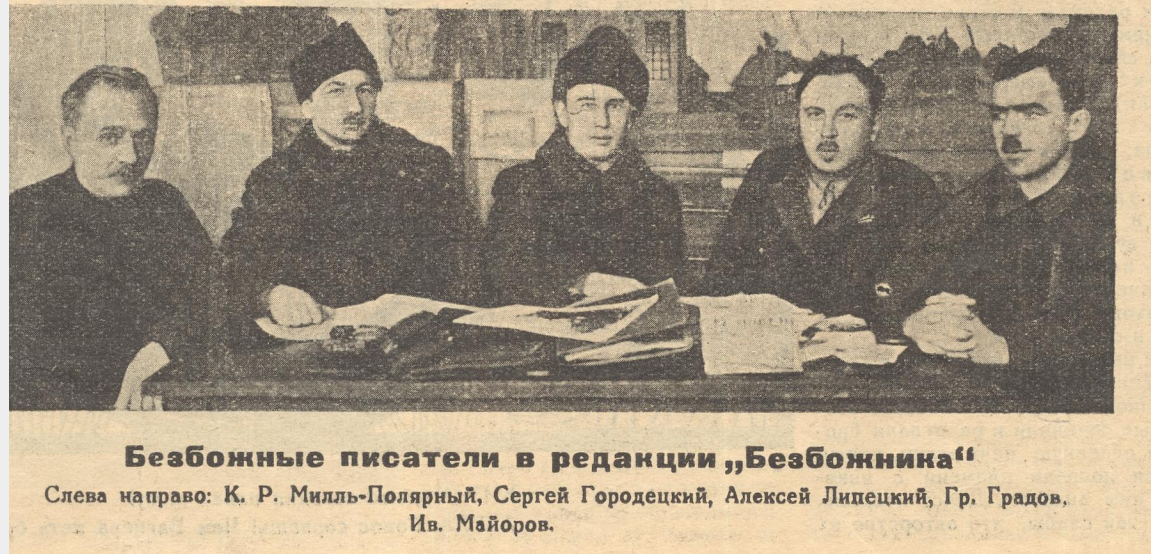
Atheist writers at the editorial office of Bezbozhnik. From left to right: K. R. Mill-Polyarny, Sergey Gorodetsky, Alexey Lipetskiy, Gr. Gradov, Iv. Mayorov

== Notes ==
- «Православие : Словарь атеиста» / [Беленкин И. Ф. и др.]. / Под общей редакцией доктора философских наук Н. С. Гордиенко/ - М. : Политиздат, 1988. - 270,[2] с.; 17 см.; ISBN 5-250-00079-7 / С. 34
- Атеистический словарь / [Абдусамедов А. И., Алейник Р. М., Алиева Б. А. и др.; под общ. ред. М. П. Новикова]. - 2-е изд., испр. и доп. - Москва : Политиздат, 1985. - 512 с.; 20 см / С. 51
- Безбожник / Православная энциклопедия / Т. 4, С. 444-445
