= Derevenskiy Bezbozhnik =

Soviet anti-religious magazine (1928–1932)

Derevenskiy Bezbozhnik (Деревенский безбожник)
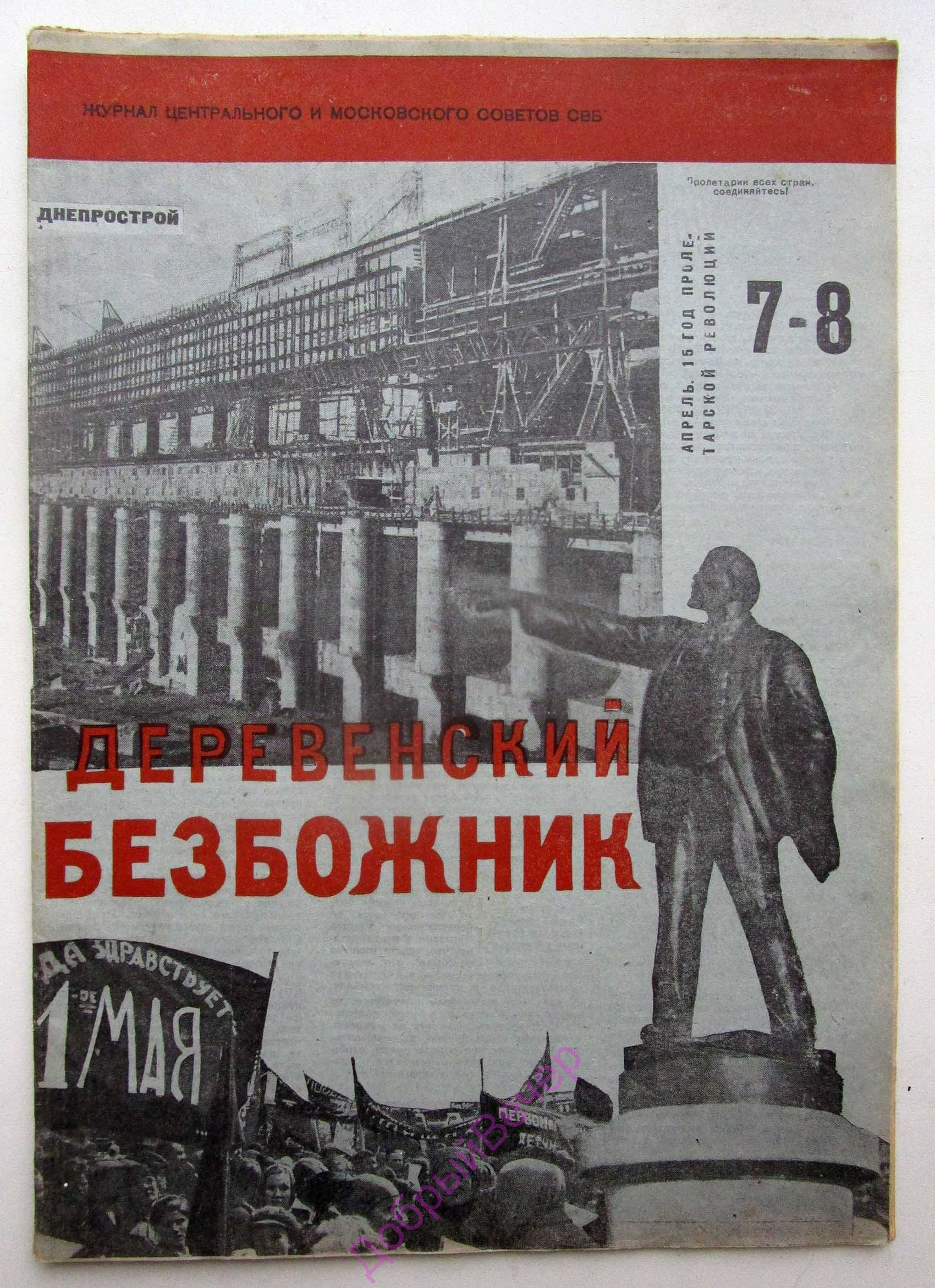
- Cover of the magazine «Derevenskiy Bezbozhnik» 1932, No. 7-8.
- Editor: Zalezhsky, Vladimir Nikolaevich (Russian: Залежский, Владимир Николаевич), since November 1929 − Lunin, Anatoly Vladimirovich (Russian: Лунин, Анатолий Владимирович)
- Categories: antireligious
- Frequency: Monthly
- Founded: April 1928
- Final issue: November 1932
- Country: Soviet Union/Russia
- Based in: Moscow
- Language: Russian

Derevenskiy Bezbozhnik (Russian: «Деревенский безбожник»; translation of the name: «The Rural Godless») was an illustrated magazine, an organ of the Centre Soviet and Moscow Oblast Soviet of the League of the Militant Godless.

The magazine was created by the Moscow Committee of the All-Union Communist Party (b). The magazine was published in Moscow from April 1928 to November 1932. Since 1 July 1930 Derevenskiy Bezbozhnik became an organ of the Centre Soviet and Moscow Oblast Soviet of the League of the Militant Godless. First, the magazine came out once, then twice a month, with a circulation of 5 to 50 thousand copies. The magazine covered issues of the anti-religious movement during the period of collectivization. Pyotr Krasikov, Yemelyan Yaroslavsky, Demyan Bedny, Dmitry Moor and others collaborated in the magazine. Among the materials published in the magazine, a large place was occupied by the messages of rural correspondents.

== See also ==
- Bezbozhnik (newspaper)
- Bezbozhnik u Stanka
- Council for Religious Affairs
- Persecutions of the Catholic Church and Pius XII
- Persecution of Christians in the Soviet Union
- Persecution of Muslims in the former USSR
- Religion in the Soviet Union
- State atheism
- USSR anti-religious campaign (1928–1941)

== Notes ==
- Атеистический словарь / [Абдусамедов А. И., Алейник Р. М., Алиева Б. А. и др.; под общ. ред. М. П. Новикова]. - 2-е изд., испр. и доп. - Москва : Политиздат, 1985. - 512 с.; 20 см / С. 124
- Безбожник / Православная энциклопедия / Т. 4, С. 444-445
- Воинствующее безбожие в СССР за 15 лет. 1917-1932 : сборник / Центральный совет Союза воинствующих безбожников и Институт философии Коммунистической академии; под редакцией М. Енишерлова, А. Лукачевского, М. Митина. - Москва : ОГИЗ : Государственное антирелигиозное издательство, 1932. - 525, (2) с. : ил., портр.; 22 см. / С. 390
