= Putintsev =

Putintsev (Russian: Путинцев) is a Russian masculine surname, its feminine counterpart is Putintseva. It may refer to

- Fedor Putintsev (1899–1947), Soviet propagandist of atheism
- Yulia Putintseva (born 1995), Kazakhstani tennis player of Russian origin
