= Fedor Putintsev =

Soviet propagandist of atheism (1899–1947)

Fedor Maksimovich Putintsev (Russian: Федор Максимович Путинцев; 1899–1947) was a Soviet propagandist of atheism and a scientific worker in the study of problems of religion and atheism. He was also a journalist and writer.

== Biography ==
Member of the Russian Communist Party (b) since 1920. From 1921 to 1922 he actively participated in anti-religious propaganda. He was a member of the Central Council of the League of Militant Atheists of the USSR from 1925. In 1932–1934 he edited the newspaper Bezbozhnik. He was the editor of the magazine Bezbozhnik. Putintsev in particular participated in the campaign against religious holidays. The basic direction of his research work was history, ideology, the political role of religious sectarianism. He was a researcher of the problems of evolutionists religion, sectarianism in the period of construction of the Socialist society. Putintsev developed a handbook "Questionnaire and instructions for the collection of information about sects", on the basis of which were held sociological studies that gave a more or less complete picture of sectarian religiosity at the end of the 1920s and beginning of the 1930s. On these and other issues he wrote a lot of articles, a number of books. The main ones are "The origin of religious feasts" (M., 1924 and 1925), "The political role of sectarianism" (M., 1927 and 1929), "The Doukhobors" (M., 1927 and 1928), "The debt bondage brotherhood of the sectarians" (M., 1931), "The political role and tactics of sects" (Moscow, 1935), "On freedom of conscience in the USSR" (Moscow, 1939).

== Published works ==
- Воинствующее безбожие в СССР за 15 лет. 1917–1932 : сборник / Центральный совет Союза воинствующих безбожников и Институт философии Коммунистической академии; под редакцией М. Енишерлова, А. Лукачевского, М. Митина. – Москва : ОГИЗ : Государственное антирелигиозное издательство, 1932. – 525, 2 с. : ил., портр.; / Путинцев, Федор Максимович. Ленин и борьба с религией (Lenin and the fight against religion)/ С. 63 – 100;
- Путинцев, Федор Максимович. Рождественские и послерождественские обряды. (Christmas and post-Christmas rituals) – Томск : [б. и.], [1924]. – 23 с.;
- Путинцев, Федор Максимович. О свободе совести в СССР (On freedom of conscience in the USSR) / Ф. Путинцев. – [Москва] : Партиздат, 1937. – 46 с.;
- Путинцев, Федор Максимович. Кабала и ростовщичество под флагом сектантской взаимопомощи (Kabala and usury under the flag of sectarian mutual aid) / Ф. Путинцев. – Москва : Безбожник, [19--]. – 16 с.;
- Путинцев, Федор Максимович. Кулацко-сектантский проект поднятия урожайности (Kulak-sectarian project of raising yields) : бесплатное приложение к газ. "Безбожник" / Ф. Путинцев. – Москва : Изд. Акц. О-ва "Безбожник, [1928?] (Тип. "Кр. Газ."). – 15, [1] с.;
- Путинцев, Федор Максимович. Происхождение Пасхи (The origin of Easter) / Путинцев, Баронов. – [Орел] : Орловск. губком РКСМ : Дорпрофсож, 1923. – 26 с.;
- Путинцев, Федор Максимович. Сектанты и перевыборы советов (Sectarians and re-elections of Soviets) / Ф. Путинцев; Центр. совет воинствующих безбожников. – Москва : Безбожник, 1931 (тип. "Гудок"). – 46, [2] с.;
- Путинцев, Федор Максимович. Выборы в Советы и разоблачение поповщины (Elections to the Soviets and exposure of clericalism) / Ф. Путинцев; Ин-т философии Акад. наук СССР. – [Москва] : ГАИЗ, 1937 (17 ф-ка нац. книги треста "Полиграфкнига"). – Обл., 92 с.;
- Путинцев, Федор Максимович. Выборы в советы и разоблачение поповщины (Elections to the Soviets and exposure of clericalism) / Ин-т философии Акад. наук. – Москва : Гаиз, 1938 (17 ф-ка нац. книги). – 96 с.;
- Путинцев, Федор Максимович. Кабальное братство сектантов (The debt bondage brotherhood of the sectarians) / Ф. Путинцев; Центральный совет Союза воинствующих безбожников СССР. – Москва; Ленинград : Московский рабочий, 1931. – 200 с.;
- Путинцев, Федор Максимович. Кулацкое светопреставление (The kulak doomsday): (случаи помешательства и массового религиозного психоза на почве кулацко-провокационных слухов о "конце света") / Ф. Путинцев; Центральный совет Союза воинствующих безбожников СССР. – Москва : Безбожник, 1930. – 82 с. : ил., табл.;
- Путинцев, Федор Максимович. О свободе совести (On freedom of conscience) / Ин-т философии Академии наук СССР. – Москва : ГАИЗ, 1939. – 60 с.;
- Путинцев, Федор Максимович. Происхождение религиозных праздников (Origin of religious holidays) / Ф. Путинцев; Под ред. М. В. Горева-Галкина; С предисл. Ем. Ярославского. – Москва : Красная новь, 1924. – 222, [1] с. : ил.; 22 см. – (В помощь работе среди молодежи).
- Путинцев, Федор Максимович. Происхождение религиозных праздников (Origin of religious holidays) / Ф. Путинцев; Под ред. М. В. Горева-Галкина; С предисл. Ем. Ярославского. – 2-е изд., испр. и доп. – Москва; Ленинград : Гос. изд-во, 1925. – 192 с. : ил.;
- Путинцев, Федор Максимович. Духоборье (Doukhobors) : (Очерк из современной жизни сектантов-духоборов) / Ф. Путинцев; С предисл. П. А. Красикова; Главполитпросвет и Союз безбожников СССР. – 3-е изд. – Москва : акц. изд-ское о-во "Безбожник", [19--] (тип. изд-ва "Крестьянская газета"). – 48 с. : ил.;
- Путинцев, Федор Максимович. Политическая роль сектантства (The political role of sectarianism) / Ф. Путинцев; Под ред. К. А. Попова; Союз безбожников СССР и Главполитпросвет. – [Москва] : акц. изд-ское о-во "Безбожник, 1928 (тип. изд-ва "Крестьянская газета"). – 125 с., [3] с. объявл. : ил., портр., факс.;
- Путинцев, Федор Максимович. Политическая роль сектантства (The political role of sectarianism) / Ф. Путинцев; Под ред. К. А. Попова; Союз безбожников СССР и Главполитпросвет. – [Москва] : акц. изд-ское о-во "Безбожник", 1929 (тип. изд-ва "Крестьянская газета"). – 124, [3] с. : ил., портр., факс.;
- Путинцев, Федор Максимович. Сектантство и антирелигиозная пропаганда : (Методическое пособие) / Ф. Путинцев; Под ред. К. А. Попова; Главполитпросвет и Союз безбожников СССР. – [Москва] : акц. изд-ское о-во "Безбожник", 1928 (5-я тип. "Транспечати" НКПС "Пролетарское слово"). – 52 с.;
- Путинцев, Федор Максимович. Сектантство и антирелигиозная пропаганда (Sectarianism and anti-religious propaganda) : (Методическое пособие) / Ф. Путинцев; Обложка: ПК; Под ред. К. А. Попова; Главполитпросвет и Союз безбожников СССР. – 2-е изд. – [Москва] : акц. изд-ское о-во "Безбожник", 1928 (тип. изд-ва "Крестьянская газета"). – 52 с.;
- Путинцев, Федор Максимович. Политическая роль и тактика сект (The political role and tactics of sects) / Ф. М. Путинцев; Под ред. П. Красикова; Ин-т философии Ком. акад. и ЦС СВБ СССР. – Москва : Гаиз, 1935 (17 ф-ка нац. книги треста "Полиграфкнига"). – Переплет, тит. л., 476, [4] с. : ил.;
- Путинцев, Федор Максимович. Духоборье (Doukhobors) : (Очерк из современной жизни сектантов-духоборов) / Ф. Путинцев; С предисл. П. А. Красикова; Главполитпросвет и Союз безбожников С.С.С.Р. – Москва : акц. изд-ское о-во "Безбожник", 1928 (Мосполиграф. 12-я типо-лит. "Рабочее дело"). – 49 с. : ил., карт. в 2 краски.;
- Путинцев, Федор Максимович. Сектантство и антирелигиозная пропаганда (Sectarianism and anti-religious propaganda) : (Методическое пособие) / Ф. Путинцев; Обложка: П. К.; Под ред. К. А. Попова; Главполитпросвет и Союз безбожников СССР. – 3-е изд. - [Москва] : акц. изд-ское о-во "Безбожник", 1929 (тип. изд-ва "Крестьянская газета"). – 52 с.;
- F. Putinzew. Die Sektierer und der Kollektivwirtschaftliche Aufbau / F. Putinzew; Ubers. von I. Dyck; Red. von A. Leichtling. – Engels : Deutscher Staatsverlag, 1935. – 80 с.;
- Путинцев, Федор Максимович. Духоборье (Doukhobors) : (Очерк из современной жизни сектантов-духоборов) / С предисл. П. А. Красикова. Главполитпросвет и Союз безбожников С.С.С.Р. – 2-е изд. – [Москва] : акц. изд-ское о-во "Безбожник" : [Крестьянская газета], [1928] (тип. изд-ва "Крестьянская газета"). – 48 с. : ил., карт.;
- Путинцев, Федор Максимович. Методическое введение к серии: "Происхождение религии" / Сост.: Ф. М. Путинцовым; Под ред. Ем. Ярославского; Моск. отд. нар. образования. Мастерская световых картин. Бюро изд. Центр. дома работников прос. – Москва : Производ.-торг. отд. МОНО, 1924. – 13 с.;
- Путинцев, Федор Максимович. Об'яснительный текст к серии [диапозитивов]: "Происхожденiе религии" / Сост.: Ф. М. Путинцовым; Под ред. Ем. Ярославского; Бюро изданий Центр. дома работников просвещения; Моск. отд. нар. образования. Мастерская световых картин. – Москва : Производ.-торг. отд. МОНО, 1924. – 9 с.;
- Путинцев, Федор Максимович. Сектантская молодёжь и задачи её перевоспитания. С. 76 / Комсомол и антирелигиозная пропаганда : Сборник статей и очерков. – Москва : Мол. гвардия, 1937. – 142 с.; 20 см. – (Библиотека "Комсомольской правды");
- Путинцев Ф. М. Вопросник и методические указания по собиранию сведений о сектах / / Антирелигиозник. 1927. № 6;
- Пасха / Ем. Ярославский, Ф. Путинцев. – Москва : Изд-во газ. "Безбожник", 1925. – 48 с.;
- Голосовский, Семен Семенович. На Маныче "священном" : Сектантское движение среди молодежи / С. Голосовский, Г. Круль; Предисловие: Ф. Путинцев. – Москва; Ленинград : Молодая гвардия, 1928 (М. : тип. изд-ва "Крестьянская газета"). – 67, [2] с., [1] с. объявл.;
- Всесоюзная коммунистическая партия. Московский комитет. Агитационно-пропагандистский отдел. Лекции для партийного актива Агитпроп МК ВКП(б) : Программа и указатель литературы. – Москва : [б. и.], 1928. – 5 бр. Вып. 6: Современное сектантство / Путинцев; Путинцев. – 1928. – 4 с.;
- Исторический материализм (Historical materialism) / Авторский коллектив Ин-та красной профессуры философии в составе: И. Александров, Б. Базилевсий, Н. Волошин, М. Коломейцев, М. Корнеев, Ф. Константинов, Н. Липендин, Н. Львов, С. Николаев, Ф. Путинцев, В. Ральцевич, Е. Ситниковский; Под ред. В. Ральцевича. – [Москва] : Огиз – Моск. рабочий, 1931 (тип. "Красный пролетарий"). – 382, [2] с.; 26х17 см. – (Учебник для совпартшкол и средних звеньев сети партпросвещения);
- Антирелигиозный крестьянский учебник (An anti-religious peasant textbook) : Для деревенского антирелиг. актива и деревенских антирелигиозных кружков / С предисл. Ем. Ярославского...; Союз безбожников СССР и Главполитпросвет. – [Москва] : акц. изд-ское о-во "Безбожник", 1928 (5-я тип. "Транспечати" НКПС "Пролетарское слово"). – 237, [2] с. : ил., черт., карт.; 24х16 см. То же: То же / В составлении учебника приняли участие М. Воронцовская, Г. Воронцовский, Ф. Ковалев и др.; Ред. Ф. Путинцев и М. Шейнман. – 1930. – 432 с. : ил., портр., диагр., карт.
