= Persecution of Christians in the Soviet Union =

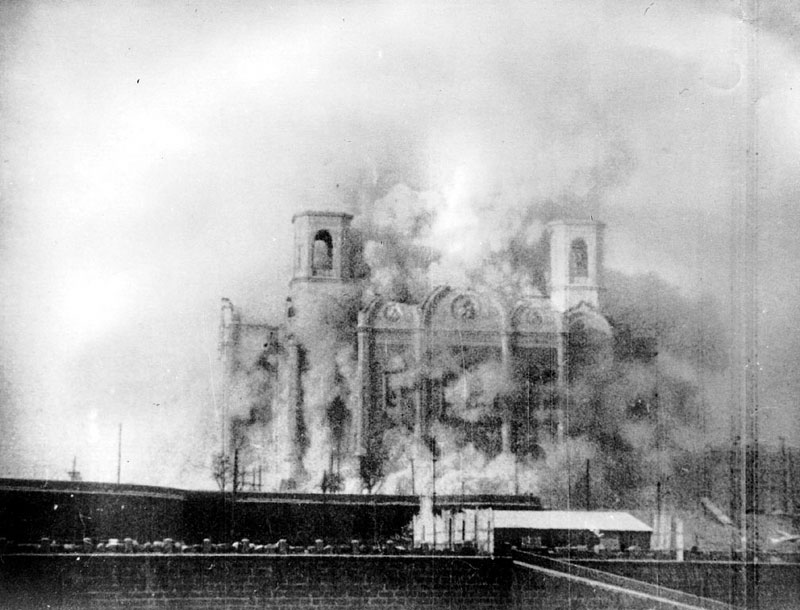
The destruction of the Cathedral of Christ the Saviour under the policy of Marxist-Leninist state atheism in the USSR

Throughout the history of the Soviet Union (1922–1991), there were periods when Soviet authorities suppressed and persecuted various forms of Christianity to different extents depending on state interests. Soviet Marxist-Leninist policy consistently advocated the control, suppression, and ultimately, the elimination of religious beliefs, and it actively encouraged the propagation of Marxist–Leninist atheism in the Soviet Union. However, most religions were never officially outlawed.

The state advocated the destruction of religion, and to achieve this goal, it officially denounced religious beliefs as superstitious and backward. The Communist Party destroyed churches, synagogues, and mosques, ridiculed, harassed, incarcerated and executed religious leaders, as part of the promotion of state atheism. Religious beliefs and practices persisted among some of the population.

From 1917 until 1991, Christians were imprisoned by Soviet authorities for numerous reasons such as protesting antireligious policies, leading congregations, conducting missionary work, organizing Sunday schools, mobilizing the youth to Christian societies, political opposition to Soviet power, national or class identity, and ordinary crimes.

== Official Soviet stance ==
The Soviet Union had an ostensible commitment to the complete annihilation of religious institutions and ideas. Communist ideology could not coexist with the continued influence of religion even as an independent institutional entity, so "Lenin demanded that communist propaganda must employ militancy and irreconcilability towards all forms of idealism and religion", and that was called "militant atheism". "Militant" meant an uncompromising attitude toward religion and the effort of winning the hearts and minds of believers from a false philosophy. Militant atheism became central to the ideology of the Communist Party of the Soviet Union and a high priority policy of all Soviet leaders. Convinced atheists were considered to be more politically astute and virtuous individuals.

The state established atheism as the only scientific truth. Soviet authorities forbade the criticism of atheism and agnosticism until 1936 or of the state's anti-religious policies; such criticism could lead to forced retirement.

Soviet law never officially outlawed the holding of religious views, and the various Soviet Constitutions always guaranteed the right to believe. However, since Marxist ideology as interpreted by Lenin and his successors regarded religion as an obstacle to the construction of a communist society, putting an end to all religions (and replacing them with atheism) became a fundamentally important ideological goal of the Soviet state. The official persecution of religion took place through many legal measures which were designed to hamper the performance of religious activities, through a large volume of anti-religious propaganda and education. In practice, the state also sought to control the activities of religious bodies and interfere in their internal affairs, with the ultimate goal of making them disappear. To this effect, the state sought to control the activities of the leaders of different religious communities.

The Communist Party often rejected the principle of treating all religious believers as public enemies, partly due to pragmatic considerations (given the large number of people who adhered to a particular faith) and partly based on its belief that the large number of believers included many loyal Soviet citizens whom the authorities sought to convince to become atheists rather than attack outright.

Religious believers always found themselves subjected to anti-religious propaganda and legislation that restricted their religious practices. They frequently suffered restrictions within Soviet society. Rarely, however, did the Soviet state ever officially subject them to arrest, imprisonment or death simply for holding their religious beliefs. Instead, the methods of persecution represented a reaction to the perception (real or imagined) of their resistance to the state's broader campaign against religion.

The campaign was designed by Soviet authorities to disseminate atheism, and the acts of violence and terror tactics which were deployed, while almost always officially invoked on the basis of perceived resistance to the state, aimed in the larger scheme not simply to dampen opposition, but to further assist in the suppression of religion in order to disseminate atheism.

== Soviet tactics ==
Tactics varied over the years and they became more moderate or harsher at different times. Some common tactics included confiscating church property, ridiculing religion, harassing believers, and promoting atheism through the educational system. Actions against particular religions, however, were determined by State interests, and most organized religions were never outlawed.

Some actions against Orthodox priests and believers included torture, execution or sending them to prison camps, labor camps and mental hospitals. Many Orthodox (along with peoples of other faiths) were also subjected to psychological punishment or torture and mind control experimentation in order to force them to give up their religious convictions (see Punitive psychiatry in the Soviet Union). During the first five years of Soviet power, the Bolsheviks executed 28 Russian Orthodox bishops and over 1,200 Russian Orthodox priests. Many others were imprisoned or exiled.

The Lutheran Church was persecuted in the Soviet Union, with congregations dwindling from 1,828 in 1917 to just 160 in 1922. Lutherans in the USSR lost their churches, in addition to farmland. In 1929, two Lutheran priests and thirty Sunday School teachers were arrested.

In the Soviet Union, in addition to the methodical closing and destruction of churches, the charitable and social work which was formerly done by ecclesiastical authorities was taken over by the state. As with all private property, Church-owned property was confiscated and put to public use. The few places of worship which were still left to the Church were legally viewed as state property which the government permitted the church to use.

In the period which followed the Second World War, Protestant Christians in the USSR (Baptists, Pentecostals, Adventists etc.) were forcibly sent to mental hospitals, or they were tried and imprisoned (often for refusing to enter military service). Some were forcibly deprived of their parental rights.

== Anti-religious campaign (1917–1921) ==
In August 1917, following the collapse of the tsarist government, a council of the Russian Orthodox Church reestablished the patriarchate and elected the metropolitan Tikhon as patriarch.

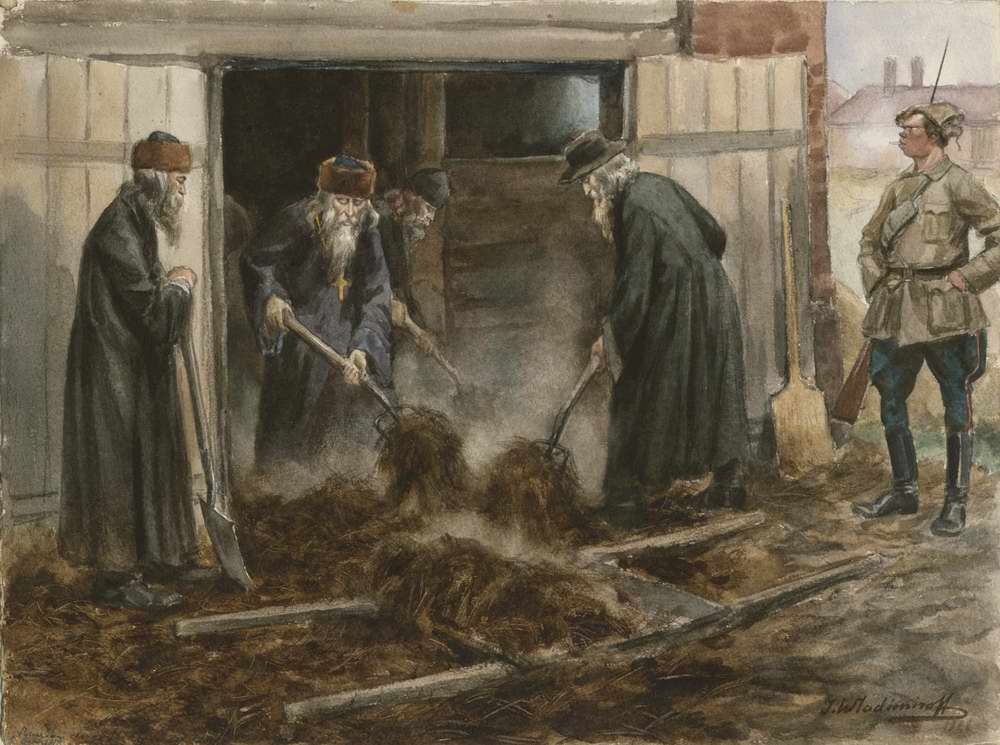
Clergy on forced labor, by Ivan Vladimirov

In November 1917, within weeks of the revolution, the People's Commissariat for Enlightenment was established, which a month later created the All-Russian Union of Teachers-Internationalists for the purpose of removing religious instruction from school curricula. In order to intensify the anti-religious propaganda in the school system, the Chief Administration for Political Enlightenment (Glavpolitprosvet) was established in November 1920.

Lenin's decree on the separation of church and state in early 1918 deprived the formerly official church of its status of legal personhood, the right to own property, or to teach religion in both state and private schools or to any group of minors. The decree abolished the privileges of the church and thus ended the alliance between church and state. The clergy openly attacked the decree. The leadership of the Church issued a special appeal to believers to obstruct the enforcement of the decree.

In addition, the Decree "On the Separation of the Church from the State and the School from the Church" also determined the relationship between school and church. "School shall be separated from church," the Decree said. "The teaching of religious doctrines in all the state and public, as well as private educational institutions where general subjects are taught shall not be permitted. Citizens may teach and be taught religion in private."

Patriarch Tikhon of Moscow excommunicated the Soviet leadership on January 19, 1918 (Julian Calendar), for conducting this campaign. In retaliation, the Soviets arrested and killed dozens of bishops, thousands of the lower clergy and monastics, and multitudes of laity. The seizing of church property over the next few years would be marked by a brutal campaign of violent terror.

During the Russian Civil War, many clerics were killed. Some died as a result of spontaneous violence endemic in the power vacuum of the war and some were executed by state security services for supporting the White armies. The church claimed that 322 bishops and priests had been killed during the Revolution. Between June 1918 and January 1919, official church figures (which did not include the Volga, Kama and several other regions in Russia) claimed that one metropolitan, eighteen bishops, one hundred and two priests, one hundred and fifty-four deacons, and ninety-four monks/nuns had been killed (laity not recorded). The estimate of 330 clergy and monastics killed by 1921 may have been an underestimate, due to the fact that 579 monasteries/convents had been liquidated during this period and there were widespread mass executions of monks/nuns during these liquidations.

Many sections of the Russian Orthodox Church supported the anti-Soviet regimes such as those of Kolchak and Denikin during the civil war. In 1918, the Bishop of Ufa made xenophobic and anti-Bolshevik speeches and rallied the people to the White cause in 1918. The Archbishop of Ekaterinburg organized protest demonstrations when he learned of the Romanov family's execution in July 1918, and he held a victory celebration when Admiral Kolchak took the city in February 1919. In both the Siberian and Ukrainian fronts, "Jesus Christ Regiments", organized by Orthodox hiearachs on the scene, aided White Armies. In December 1918, the priest Georgy Shavelsky joined the propaganda agency of the White government in the South.

This widespread violence by members of the Red Army against the church was not openly supported by Lenin, though in later years high-ranking Soviet officials including Emelian Yaroslavsky claimed central responsibility for these killings. They justified the violence by revising history and declaring that the church had been actively fighting against them.

The church had expressed its support to General Kornilov's counter-revolutionary coup attempt, assisted the rebellions of Kerensky and Krasnov, and had called on believers to fight against the new state, and even to shed blood in fighting against it. There was Tikhon's appeal "To the Orthodox People" in which he presented Tikhon's call for believers to be willing even to give up their lives as martyrs in the effort to preserve their religion ("It is better to shed one's blood and to be awarded martyr's crown than to let the enemies desecrate Orthodox faith," said the Appeal.)

Most of the clergy reacted toward the Russian Revolution with open hostility. During the Civil War, many representatives of the Russian orthodox clergy collaborated or had sympathies with the White Armies and foreign invading armies, hoping for a restoration of the prerevolutionary regime. The church had expressed its support to General Kornilov's counter-revolutionary coup attempt. The church adopted the Enactment on Legal Status of the Church in Russia which tried to vindicate the rights that the church had previously enjoyed for centuries. The Orthodox Church said the document, "holds the pre-eminent public and legal position in Russian state among other denominations". Tikhon anathematized the Soviet government and called on believers to fight against it and its decrees. The church leadership openly urged fighting against the Soviet government in its appeal entitled "To the Orthodox People". "It is better to shed one's blood and to be awarded martyr's crown than to let the enemies desecrate Orthodox faith," said the Appeal.

The church's opposition to the Soviet government was part of a general counter-revolutionary movement. In the first days after the victory of the October armed uprising in Petrograd, the clergy assisted the rebellion of Kerensky and Krasnov as they attempted to overthrow Soviet power. The activity of the Local Council in Moscow supported the cadets who had revolted. When the rebels seized the Kremlin for a time, its cathedrals and bell-towers were placed at their disposal at once.

Church resistance was not organized nationally, however, and Tikhon never gave his blessing to White forces. The Patriarch in fact declared his neutrality during the civil war and attempted to issue instructions to the Russian Orthodox Church on political neutrality and disengagement. Propaganda at the time claimed that this was a camouflage for the church's real position which was supposedly support for a return of Tsarism.

Furthermore, the fraudulence of later Soviet revisions is clearly shown through the fact that none of the documented acts of brutalities against members of the clergy by the Reds involved anyone who actually took up arms with the Whites, and only a few of them were cases of clergy who gave vocal support.

Anti-religious atheistic propaganda was considered to be of essential importance to Lenin's party from its early pre-revolutionary days and the party quickly created atheist journals to attack religion shortly after coming to power. The first operated under the name Revolution and the Church (Revolustiia i tserkov). It was originally believed in the ideology that religion would disappear quickly with the coming of the revolution and that its replacement with atheism would be inevitable. The leadership of the new state did not take much time, however, to come to the conclusion that religion would not disappear on its own and greater efforts should be given to anti-religious propaganda.

For this purpose atheistic work was centrally consolidated underneath the Agitation and Propaganda Department of the CP Central Committee (Agitprop) in 1920 using the guidelines of article 13 of the Russian Communist Party (RCP) adopted by the 8th party congress.

Article 13 stated:

As far as religion is concerned, the RCP will not be satisfied by the decreed separation of Church and State... The Party aims at the complete destruction of links between the exploiting classes and... religious propaganda, while assisting the actual liberation of the working masses from religious prejudices and organizing the broadest possible education-enlightening and anti-religious propaganda. At the same time it is necessary carefully to avoid any insult to the believers' feelings, which would lead to the hardening of religious fanaticism

The article would be very important in later years for anti-religious policy in the USSR, and its last sentence—which was both ignored and recognized at different points in Soviet history—would play a role in subsequent power struggles between different Soviet leaders.

Public debates were held between Christians and atheists after the revolution up until they were suspended in 1929. Among famous participants of these debates included, on the atheist side, Commissar for Enlightenment Anatoly Lunacharsky. People would line up for hours in order to get seats to see them. The authorities sometimes tried to limit the speaking time of the Christians to ten minutes, and on other occasions the debates would be called off at the last minute. This may have been a result of a reportedly high quality of some of the religious debaters. Professor V.S. Martsinkovsky, raised as Orthodox but who had become an evangelical Protestant, was one of the best on the religious side, and Lunacharsky reportedly canceled one of his debates with him after having lost in a previous debate. On one occasion in 1921, a large crowd of Komsomol hecklers arrived at one of Martsinkovsky's debates and occupied the two front rows. When the leader tried to heckle, he found himself unsupported by his boys, and afterwards they told him that he was not saying what they were told he was going to say.

== Anti-religious campaign (1921–1928) ==
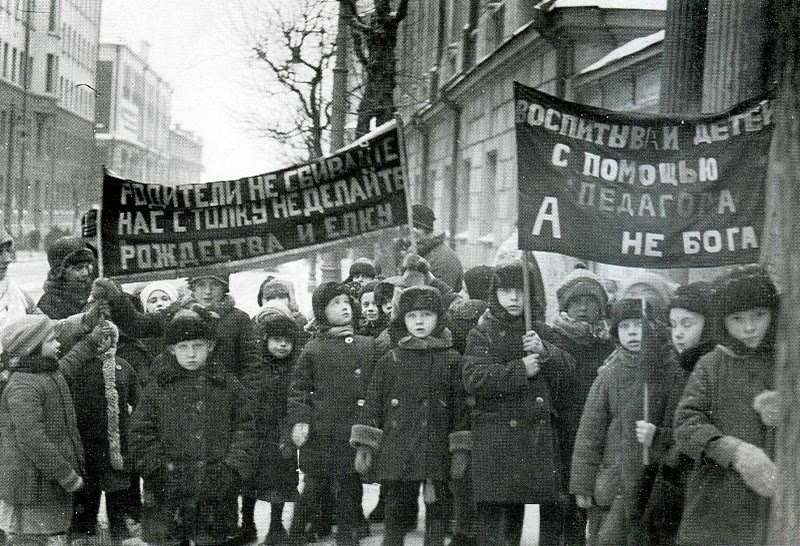
Soviet children protesting against Christmas in Moscow, 1929. The banners call for parents not to buy Christmas trees (left) and for the encouragement of secular education (right).

The tenth CPSU congress met in 1921 and it passed a resolution calling for 'wide-scale organization, leadership, and cooperation in the task of anti-religious agitation and propaganda among the broad masses of the workers, using the mass media, films, books, lectures, and other devices.

When church leaders demanded 'freedom of religion' under the constitution, the Bolsheviks responded with swift justice. They killed the metropolitan of Kiev and executed twenty-eight bishops and 6,775 priests. Despite mass demonstrations in support of the church, repression cowed most ecclesiastical leaders into submission.

In August 1921, a Plenary meeting of the CPSU Central Committee (the highest leadership of the state) adopted an 11-point instruction on the interpretation and application of article 13 (mentioned above). It differentiated between religious believers and uneducated believers, and allowed the latter to have party membership if they were devoted to Communism, but that they should be re-educated to make them atheists. It also called for moderation in the anti-religious campaign and emphasized that the state was fighting against all religion and not simply individual ones (such as the Orthodox church)

The public debates began to be suppressed after the 10th congress, until they were formally suspended in 1929 and replaced with public lectures by atheists. V. S. Martsinkovsky was arrested and sent into exile in 1922 on account of his preaching that was attracting people to religion and told he could return in a few years once the workers had become wiser (he was in fact never allowed to return).

The church allegedly tried to set up free theo-philosophical academies, study circles and periodicals in the 1920s, which Lenin met by arresting and expelling all the organizers abroad and shutting down these efforts with force.

Despite the August 1921 instruction, the state took a very hard line against the Orthodox Church on the pretext that it was a legacy of the Tsarist past (the difference in practice and policy may have reflected internal disagreement among the party leadership). Leon Trotsky wanted Patriarch Tikhon to be killed, but Lenin forbade it for fear it would produce another Patriarch Hermogenes (a Patriarch who was killed by the Poles when they occupied Moscow in 1612).

In order to weaken the Orthodox church, the state supported a schism called the Renovationist sect, by giving it legal recognition in 1922 and continuing to terrorize the old Orthodox as well as deprive it of legal means of existence. The Patriarch was arrested in 1922 under thinly veiled criminal proceedings, and his chancery was taken over by the Renovationists. The Renovationists restored a Holy Synod to power, and brought division among clergy and faithful.

In March 1922, amid a devastating famine that struck Soviet Russia and Ukraine, the Soviet government launched a campaign to confiscate valuable items from Orthodox churches. The aim of the campaign had both economic and political dimensions: to help manage the economic crisis caused by the Russian Civil War and the War Communism, and to reduce the influence of the Orthodox Church over the peasantry. In a secret letter to Politburo, Lenin said that famine provides a perfect opportunity to make an offensive campaign against the church:

"It is precisely now and only now, when in the starving regions people are eating human flesh, and hundreds if not thousands of corpses are littering the roads, that we can (and therefore must) carry out the confiscation of church valuables with the most savage and merciless energy, not stopping [short of] crushing any resistance." - Lenin, Letter to Molotov for Politburo Members, 1922.

Factory and office workers in 1921 proposed that the church's wealth be used for hunger relief. These proposals were supported by some clergymen. In August 1921, Patriarch Tikhon issued a message to the Russian people calling them to help famine victims and he gave his blessing for voluntary donations of church valuables that were not directly used in liturgical services. The Church position has changed when the All-Russian Central Executive Committee of the RSFSR issued a decree that all church valuables should be expropriated in response to the people's requests on February 26, 1922, an action which according to the 73rd Apostolic Canon of the Orthodox Church is regarded as sacrilege. Because of this, Tikhon and many priests opposed giving any part of the valuables, doubting that the valuables would go to help the hungry. Tikhon threatened repressions against those clergymen and laymen who wanted to give away church riches.

Under the decree, part of the gold and silver articles were to be confiscated from the property placed at the disposal of believers by the state free of charge. Articles made of precious metals were to be taken away with caution and the clergymen were to be informed in advance of the procedure and dates for the confiscation. It was stipulated that the process of expropriation should not hinder public worship or hurt the interests of believers.

The Soviet campaign to confiscate church property was met with resistance from peasant and workers, with the violent incident occurring in March 1922 in the small town of Shuia. Large crowds of people have been gathering at the Resurrection Cathedral to protect it from the commissioners. To keep the situation under control, the Presidium of the District Executive Committee prohibited public demonstrations and declared a state of emergency. The tensions escalated when people stormed the local Military Commissariat. As violent clashes with soldiers began, two trucks with machine gunners opened the fire into the crowd. Five believers were killed and eleven hospitalized.

Soviet police reports from 1922 claim that the peasantry (and especially women) considered Tikhon to be a martyr after his arrest over his supposed resistance and that the 'progressive' clergy were traitors to the religion; there were also rumors circulated that Jews were running the Soviet Supreme Church Administration, and for this reason Lenin forbade Trotsky from involvement with the campaign, and prevented certain key roles being given to those of Jewish descent.

Reacting to the incident in Shuia, Lenin wrote that the entire issue of the church valuable campaign could be used as a pretext in the public eye to attack the church and kill clergy, since he believed that the peasant masses would not support the church's hold on its valuables in light of the famine. Otto von Radowitz, the counselor at the German embassy in Moscow, recorded that the campaign was a deliberate provocation to get the clergy to react in order to attack it in response.

The sixth sector of the OGPU, led by Yevgeny Tuchkov, began aggressively arresting and executing bishops, priests, and devout worshipers, such as Metropolitan Veniamin in Petrograd in 1922 for refusing to accede to the demand to hand in church valuables (including sacred relics). Archbishop Andronik of Perm, who worked as a missionary in Japan, who was shot after being forced to dig his own grave. Bishop Germogen of Tobolsk, who voluntarily accompanied the czar into exile, was strapped to the paddle wheel of a steamboat and mangled by the rotating blades. .

In 1922, the Solovki Camp of Special Purpose, the first Russian concentration camp and a former Orthodox monastery, was established in the Solovki Islands in the White Sea. In the years 1917–1935, 130,000 Russian Orthodox priests were arrested; 95,000 were put to death, executed by firing squad. Father Pavel Florensky, exiled in 1928 and executed in 1937, was one of the New-martyrs of this particular period.

In the first five years after the Bolshevik revolution, an English journalist estimated that 28 bishops and 1,215 priests were executed. Recently released evidence indicates over 8,000 were killed in 1922 during the conflict over church valuables.

Specialized anti-religious publications began in 1922, including Yemelyan Yaroslavsky's Bezbozhnik, which later formed the basis for the League of the Militant Godless (LMG).

With the conclusion of the campaign of seizing church valuables, the terror campaign against the church was called off for a while. The church closings ended for a period and abuses were investigated. The propaganda war continued, and public institutions worked to purge religious views from intellectuals and academia.

The old Marxist assumption that religion would disappear on its own with changing material conditions was pragmatically challenged as religion persisted. The Soviet leadership debated how best to combat religion. The positions ranged from the 'rightist' belief that religion would die on its own naturally with increasing education and the 'leftist' belief that religion needed to be attacked strongly. Lenin called the struggle to disseminate atheism 'the cause of our state'.

The government had difficulties trying to implement anti-religious education in schools, due to a shortage of atheist teachers. Anti-religious education began in secondary schools in 1925.

The state changed its position on the renovationists and began to increasingly see them as an independent threat in the late 1920s due to their great success in attracting people to religion. Tikhon died in 1925 and the Soviets forbade the holding of patriarchal elections. Patriarchal locum tenens (acting Patriarch) Metropolitan Sergius (Stragorodsky, 1887–1944) issued a declaration in 1927, accepting the Soviet authority over the church as legitimate, pledging the church's cooperation with the government and condemning political dissent within the church.

He did this in order to secure the survival of the church. Metropolitan Sergius formally expressed his "loyalty" to the Soviet government and thereafter refrained from criticizing the state in any way. This attitude of loyalty, however, provoked more divisions in the church itself: inside Russia, a number of faithful opposed Sergius, and abroad, the Russian metropolitans of America and western Europe severed their relations with Moscow.

By this he granted himself with the power that he, being a deputy of imprisoned Metropolitan Peter and acting against his will, had no right to assume according to the XXXIV Apostolic canon, which led to a split with the Russian Orthodox Church Outside of Russia abroad and the Russian True Orthodox Church (Russian Catacomb Church) within the Soviet Union, as they remained faithful to the Canons of the Apostles, declaring the part of the church led by Metropolitan Sergius schism, sometimes coined as sergianism.

Due to this canonical disagreement it is disputed which church has been the legitimate successor to the Russian Orthodox Church that had existed before 1925.

In 1927, the state tried to mend the schism by bringing the renovationists back into the Orthodox church, partly so that the former could be better controlled through agents they had in the latter.

The Komsomol and later LMG would try to implement the 10th Congress resolution by various attacks, parades, theatrical performances, journals, brochures and films. The Komsomol would hold crude blasphemous 'Komsomol Christmases' and 'Komsomol Easters' headed by hooligans dressed as orthodox clergy. The processions would include the burning of icons, religious books, mock images of Christ, the Virgin, etc. The propaganda campaign, however, was a failure and many people remained with their religious convictions. The church held its own public events with some success, and well competed with the anti-religious propaganda during these years.

== Anti-religious campaign (1928–1941) ==
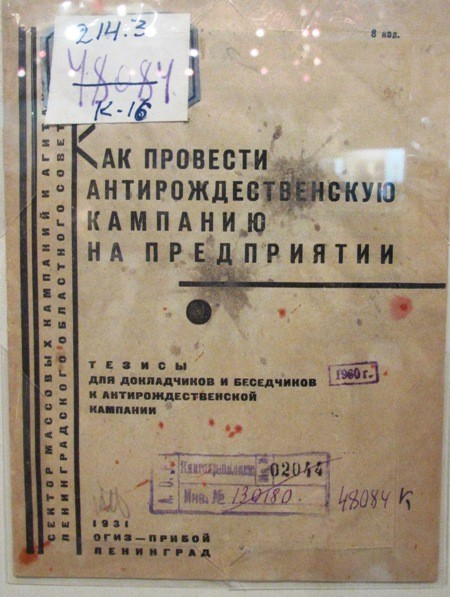
How to hold a workplace-wide anti-Christmas campaign. 1931.

The Orthodox church suffered terribly in the 1930s, and many of its members were killed or sent to labor camps. Between 1927 and 1940, the number of Orthodox churches in the Russian Republic fell from 29,584 to fewer than 500. The watershed year was 1929, when Soviet policy put much new legislation in place that formed the basis for the harsh anti-religious persecution in the 1930s.

Anti-religious education was introduced beginning in the first-grade in 1928 and anti-religious work was intensified throughout the education system. At the same time, in order to remove the church's intellectuals and support official propaganda that only backward people believed in God, the government conducted a massive purge of Christian intellectuals, most of whom died in the camps or in prison.

The church's successful competition with the ongoing and widespread atheistic propaganda, prompted new laws to be adopted in 1929 on 'Religious Associations' as well as amendments to the constitution, which forbade all forms of public, social, communal, educational, publishing or missionary activities for religious believers. This also prevented, of course, the church from printing any material for public consumption or responding to the criticism against it. This caused many religious tracts to be circulated as illegal literature or samizdat. Numerous other measures were introduced that were designed to cripple the church, and effectively made it illegal to have religious activities of any sort outside of liturgical services within the walls of the few churches that would remain open, and even these would be subject to much interference and harassment. Catechism classes, religious schools, study groups, Sunday schools and religious publications were all illegal and/or banned.

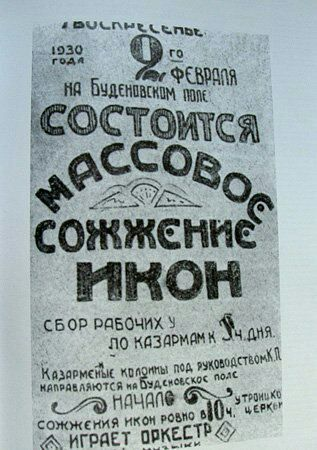
Mass burning of icons, 1930, in Noginsk, Russian SFSR

The League of the Militant Godless, under Yemelyan Yaroslavsky, was the main instrument of the anti-religious campaign and it was given special powers that allowed it to dictate to public institutions throughout the country what they needed to do for the campaign.

After 1929 and through the 1930s, the closing of churches, mass arrests of the clergy and religiously active laity, and persecution of people for attending church reached unprecedented proportions. The LMG employed terror tactics against believers in order to further the campaign, while employing the guise of protecting the state or prosecuting law-breakers. The clergy were attacked as foreign spies and trials of bishops were conducted with their clergy as well as lay adherents who were reported as 'subversive terroristic gangs' that had been unmasked. Official propaganda at the time called for the banishment of the very concept of God from the Soviet Union. These persecutions were meant to assist the goal of eliminating religion. From 1932 to 1937 Joseph Stalin declared the 'five-year plans of atheism' and the LMG was charged with eliminating all religious expression in the country. Many of these same methods and terror tactics were also imposed against others that the Soviet Union considered to be its ideological enemies.

The debate between the 'rightist' and 'leftist' sides of how to best combat religion found some conclusion in 1930 and afterwards, when the state officially condemned extremes on both sides. Marxist leaders who took either position on this issue would find themselves attacked by Stalin, who did not tolerate other authorities to speak as authorities on public policy.

A lull in the active persecution was experienced in 1930-33 following Stalin's 1930 article 'Diziness From Success', however, it swept back in fervor again afterwards.

In 1934 the persecution of the Renovationist sect began to reach the proportions of the persecution of the old Orthodox church.

During the purges of 1937 and 1938, church documents record that 168,300 Russian Orthodox clergy were arrested. Of these, 106,300 were shot. Many thousands of victims of persecution became recognized in a special canon of saints known as the "new martyrs and confessors of Russia".

A decline in enthusiasm in the campaign occurred in the late 1930s. The tone of the anti-religious campaign changed and became more moderate . It ended at the outbreak of World War II.

Official Soviet figures reported that up to one third of urban and two thirds of rural population still held religious beliefs by 1937. However, the anti-religious campaign of the past decade and the terror tactics of the militantly atheist government had effectively eliminated all public expressions of religion and communal gatherings of believers outside of the walls of the few churches that still held services. This was accomplished in a country that only a few decades earlier had had a deeply Christian public life and culture that had developed for almost a thousand years.

Of the Christians persecuted in the former Soviet Union, at least 106,300 were Christian clergy who were executed between 1937 and 1941.

== World War II rapprochement ==
The USSR annexed new territories including Eastern Poland, the Baltic republics and a portion of Finland in 1939–1940. Anti-religious work in these territories was lax in comparison with the rest of the country, which as a whole experienced a decline in persecution after the annexations. The regular seven-day work week was brought back in 1940.

Hitler invaded the Soviet Union in June 1941, and many churches were re-opened under the German occupation. Stalin ended the anti-religious campaign in order to rally the country and prevent a large base of Nazi support (which existed in some areas in the early stages of the invasion). In September 1941, three months after the Nazi attack, the last antireligious periodicals were shut down, officially because of a paper shortage. Churches were re-opened in the Soviet Union and the League of the Militant Godless was disbanded. Emelian Yaroslavsky, the leader and founder of the LMG, who had led the entire national anti-religious campaign in the 1930s, found himself writing an article in praise of Orthodox Christian Fyodor Dostoyevsky for his alleged hatred of the Germans.

The German forces, while allowing much greater religious tolerance, attempted to sever the Orthodox church's loyalties to the Patriarch in Moscow during the occupation, sometimes with threats. Ukrainian Banderist nationalist partisans killed a number of clergy under the occupation who retained loyalty to the Patriarch. The Germans, while allowing the reopening of churches and religious life in the occupied region, did not allow for seminaries to reopen due to the occupation objective of eliminating education for the Slavic peoples, which would be reduced to no more than the first two primary school grades.

Joseph Stalin revived the Russian Orthodox Church to intensify patriotic support for the war effort and presented Russia as a defender of Christian civilization, because he saw the church had an ability to arouse the people in a way that the party could not. On September 4, 1943, Metropolitans Sergius (Stragorodsky), Alexius (Simansky) and Nicholas (Yarushevich) were officially received by Soviet leader Joseph Stalin who proposed to create the Moscow Patriarchate. They received permission to convene a council on September 8, 1943, that elected Sergius Patriarch of Moscow and All Russia. The church had a public presence once again and passed measures reaffirming their hierarchical structure that flatly contradicted the 1929 legislation and even Lenin's 1918 decree. The official legislation was never withdrawn, however, which is suggestive that the authorities did not consider that this tolerance would become permanent. This is considered by some a violation of the XXX Apostolic canon, as no church hierarch could be consecrated by secular authorities. A new patriarch was elected, theological schools were opened, and thousands of churches began to function. The Moscow Theological Academy Seminary, which had been closed since 1918, was re-opened.

Many surviving clergy could return from camps or prisons, although a significant number (especially those who did not recognize Sergii's 1927 loyalty pledge) remained and were not allowed to return unless they renounced their position. Some clergy that had not recognized the 1927 pledge, such as Bishop Afanasii (Sakharov), recognized the validity of the new election and even encouraged those in the underground church to do so as well, but were not allowed to return from exile despite this.

Even after the rapprochement, there was still use of terror tactics in some cases. After the Red Army recaptured occupied territories, many clergy in these territories were arrested and sent to prisons or camps for very long terms, allegedly for collaboration with the Germans, but effectively for their rebuilding of religious life underneath the occupation.

For example, Riga priest Nikolai Trubetskoi (1907–1978) lived under the Nazi occupation of Latvia, and when the Germans retreated out of Latvia in 1944, he escaped out of a German evacuation boat and hid behind to await the Red Army, but he was arrested by the NKVD and sentenced to ten years of hard labor for collaboration with the enemy. This was because under the occupation he had been a zealous pastor and had done very successful missionary work. In reference to missionary work in the occupied territory near Leningrad he wrote 'We opened and re-consecrated closed churches, carried out mass baptisms. It's hard to imagine how, after years of Soviet domination, people hungered after the Word of God. We married and buried people; we had literally no time for sleep. I think that if such a mission were sent today [1978] to the Urals, Siberia or even the Ukraine, we'd see the same result.'.

Metropolitan Iosif (Chernov) (1893–1975), the Bishop of Taganrog before the War, had spent nine years in Soviet prisons and camps by the time Germans occupied the city. He used the opportunity of the occupation to very actively revive church life and suffered threats from the Nazis for remaining loyal to the Patriarch in Moscow. After the Nazis retreated, he was sentenced to eleven years of hard labor in Eastern Siberia for reviving church life. He was released in 1955. Archbishop Veniamin (1900–1976) of Poltava lived in the territory that belonged to Poland from 1921 to 1939. He was consecrated a bishop in 1941 just before the invasion, and he suffered some pressure from the occupying forces to break relations with the Patriarch in Moscow, but he resisted. After the Germans retreated he was arrested and imprisoned for twelve years in the Kolyma camps, from which experience he never physically recovered and lost all of his hair.

These mass arrests were echoed in territories that were not even occupied by the Germans. For example, in April 1946 there was a wave of arrests in Moscow of clergy that belonged to Bishop Afanasii's group that had returned to the official church; they were sentenced to long terms of hard labor. Many laity were arrested and imprisoned as well including the religious philosopher SI Fudel; most of them had already been in prison and few of them would see freedom until after Stalin died. The spiritual father of the group, Fr Seraphim (Batiukov), had died in 1942, but his body was dug up and disposed of elsewhere in order to prevent pilgrimages to his grave by people who believed him to be a saint.

== Post-war era ==
Between 1945 and 1959 the official organization of the church was greatly expanded, although individual members of the clergy were occasionally arrested and exiled. The number of open churches reached 25,000. By 1957 about 22,000 Russian Orthodox churches had become active. But in 1959, Nikita Khrushchev initiated his own campaign against the Russian Orthodox Church and forced the closure of about 12,000 churches. By 1985, fewer than 7,000 churches remained active.

As the Red Army progressively began to push the German soldiers out of Russia and victory became more certain, anti-religious propaganda began to resurrect. The Central Committee issued new resolutions in 1944 and 45 that called for a renewal of anti-religious propaganda. For the rest of Stalin's life, however, the propaganda was mostly limited to words and its main target was against the Vatican. With the construction of the 'Iron Curtain' across countries with large amounts of Roman Catholics, this policy was partly meant to isolate the communist countries from the Vatican's influence. Caricatures of Pius XII and other RCC bishops depicted them as war mongers and supporters of police brutalities. This propaganda was accompanied by the liquidation of the Byzantine Catholic Churches in Ukraine, Czechoslovakia, Poland, and Romania, which were forcibly merged with the Orthodox Church. They were given the option of becoming western-rite Catholics, but the absence of functioning churches in that rite except in large cities and dedication to the Byzantine ritual stopped many from doing so; many who resisted the official measure were imprisoned. The Lutheran Church in the Baltic territories along with the Roman Catholic Church were both subject to attacks for what the state perceived as loyalties to foreign influences—the Lutherans in particular were blamed for having open support for the German conquest.

Ukrainian Greek Catholic Church and its clergy became one of the victims of Soviet authorities in immediate postwar time. In 1945 Soviet authorities arrested, deported and sentenced to forced labor camps in Siberia and elsewhere the church's metropolitan Josyf Slipyj and nine bishops, as well as hundreds of clergy and leading lay activists. While being restricted in the rest of the country, the Orthodox church was encouraged to expand in the western Ukraine in order to take away believers from the Ukrainian Catholics.

All the above-mentioned bishops and significant part of clergymen died in prisons, concentration camps, internal exile, or soon after their release during the post-Stalin thaw. The exception was metropolitan Josyf Slipyj who, after 18 years of imprisonment and persecution, was released thanks to the intervention of Pope John XXIII, arrived in Rome, where he received the title of Major Archbishop of Lviv, and became cardinal in 1965. All Eastern-rite monasteries had been shut down by 1953.

The Orthodox believers fought in order to keep the churches that were re-opened during the war, and some of them were closed by the Council for the Affairs of the Orthodox Church, which also tried to prevent bishops from using disciplinary measures against church members for immorality. Local plenipotentiaries of the Council for the Affairs of the Orthodox Church used much effort to make it difficult for clergy to protect newly reopened churches (this likely applied to other religions as well). For example, in 1949, three of the fifty-five churches in the diocese of Crimea were closed, partly perhaps as a measure to scale down the prestige and achievements of the martyr-Bishop Luka. In order to assist new closures, a new measure was imposed that allowed for churches to be closed if it had not been served by a priest for six months. This new measure, coupled with the post-war shortage of clergy (through both the liquidation or arrests of clergy by the state and the lack of reopenings for seminaries), allowed for many churches to be closed.

Protestants also saw more tolerance in the post-war period. Baptists, however, were viewed with great suspicion for their active proselytizing and their strong foreign ties, especially with the United States.

Tax exemptions for monasteries were instituted on August 29, 1945.

Stalin's new tolerance for religion was limited, however, and the state would not tolerate priests who actively promoted the expansion of religion, such as the Sakharovites. For example, in 1945, Bishop Manuil was made head of the Orenburg Diocese in the Southern Urals where he reopened dozens of new parishes, re-lit the fires of faith in many lukewarm people and sparked a religious revival in the area. Consequently, he was arrested in 1947 and sentenced to eight years of hard labour. Dimitri Dudko was arrested for unpublished religious poems, and a group of Moscow University students that had started a religio-philosophic study group in the late 1940s were also infamously arrested. The latter group had started in 1946-1947 by Ilia Shmain, a 16- to 17-year-old youth and a student of philology. Shmain had concluded that materialist philosophy was inadequate to explain fundamental existential questions, and he started his club where the group discussed art, philosophy and religion. They discussed both eastern religions and Christianity. They had planned to get baptized when they were arrested on January 19, 1949 and then sentenced to 8–10 years of hard labour under the charge of criticizing the teachings of Marxist–Leninism (since they had criticized the atheistic aspects of it). The theological seminary in Saratov was shut down in 1949.

Administrative decrees and political articles of the criminal code continued to be used as guises under which antireligious persecution occurred. Religiously active and dedicated believers who tried to disseminate their faith were attacked.

There was little physical attack on the church for the remainder of Stalin's lifetime; however, the persecution escalated in 1947, at which point it was again declared that membership in the Komsomol or holding of a teaching position was incompatible with religious belief. Anti-religious propaganda was renewed in the newspapers, but with much less strength as before. Often the propaganda would refrain from mentioning religion specifically and would use some euphemism for it.

Beginning in 1946, the Soviet press began to criticize passive attitudes towards religion, especially in youth organizations such as the Komsomol and the Pioneers. It criticized public schools where it demanded re-activization of antireligious propaganda on all levels.

In 1947 the All-Union Society for the Dissemination of Political and Scientific Knowledge, Znanie ('knowledge'), for short, was established and it effectively inherited the role that had been left behind by the LMG as an anti-religious propaganda organ. It was a much more scholarly institution than the LMG, however, and it was very diverse such that even religious believers could join it. In 1949 it claimed to have 40,200 full and associate members. The CPSU Central Committee criticized the organization in 1949 for failing to have enough membership including particularly scholarly membership, not paying sufficient attention to atheist propaganda and for showing insufficient concern for ideological content in its lectures. The Committee called for it to be transformed into a mass voluntary organization of Soviet Intelligentsia (note: this did not mean people could actually refuse to join), it called for it to have more ideological content in its lectures and that all lectures are to be submitted for approval prior to delivery.

In 1950 it claimed to have 243,000 full and associate members with 1800 institutional members. It would eventually climb, by 1972, to have 2,470,000 members, including 1700 members of the Union and Republican Academics of Sciences and 107,000 professors and doctors of sciences; it would run 'Houses of Scientific Atheism' in Soviet cities.

The USSR Academy of Sciences published its first post-war atheistic periodical in 1950, but did not follow up with a second until 1954.

On July 7, 1954, the CPSU Central Committee noted that the Orthodox church and other Christian sects had successfully been attracting many young people with their sermons and public activities (which were still technically illegal under the 1929 legislation), and more people were coming to religious services. The Committee therefore called on public institutions to intensify anti-religious propaganda. It also called for all school subjects to be saturated with atheism and that anti-religious education should be enhanced. On November 10, 1954, the Committee issued a contrary resolution (there was a lack of political unity after Stalin's death) that criticized arbitrariness in the anti-religious campaign, as well as the use of slander, libel and insults against believers.

Public institutions, in answer to the July 1954 resolution, would begin producing more anti-religious propaganda in the coming years. The Academy of Science in 1957 published its Yearbook of the Museum of History of Religion and Atheism, and Znanie would begin producing a monthly-journal in 1959 called Nauka i religiia (Science and Religion), which would have some resemblance to the pre-war Bezbozhnik. It grew from 100,000 copies per issue to 400,000 by the early 1980s, and then declined to 340,000-350,000.

The school system would also begin enhancing atheistic materials in its curriculum. For example, one published textbook had the declaration, 'Religion is a fantastic and perverse reflection of the world in man's consciousness.... Religion has become the medium for the spiritual enslavement of the masses.

The period in the years following shortly after 1954 was characterized by much liberalism towards religious belief, but this would come to an end in the late 1950s. The church was built up during this period and the number of baptisms as well as seminary candidates rose

== Resumption of the anti-religious campaign ==
A new period of persecution began in the late 1950s under Nikita Khrushchev. The church had advanced its position considerably since 1941, and the government considered it to be necessary to take measures in response.

The two state organizations for overseeing religion in the country (one for the Orthodox, the other for all other faiths), changed their functions between 1957 and 1964. Originally Stalin had created them in 1943 as liaison bodies between religious communities and the state. However, in the Khrushchev years their function was re-interpreted as dictatorial supervisors over the religious activities in the country.

New instructions were issued in 1958 that attacked the position of monasteries, by placing them under high taxation, reducing their lands and working to shut them down in order to weaken the Church.

From 1959 to 1964, the persecution operated on several key levels:

1. There was a massive closure of churches (reducing the number from 22,000 to 7,000 by 1965.)
2. Closures of monasteries and convents as well as reinforcement of the 1929 legislation to ban pilgrimages
3. Closure of most of the still existing seminaries and bans on pastoral courses
4. Banning all services outside of church walls and recording the personal identities of all adults requesting church baptisms, weddings or funerals. Non-fulfillment of these regulations by clergy would lead to disallowance of state registration for them (which meant they could no longer do any pastoral work or liturgy at all, without special state permission).
5. The deprivation of parental rights for teaching religion to their children, a ban on the presence of children at church services (beginning in 1961 with the Baptists and then extended to the Orthodox in 1963) and the administration of the Eucharist to children over the age of four.
6. The forced retirement, arrests and prison sentences to clergymen who criticized atheism or the anti-religious campaign, who conducted Christian charity or who in made religion popular by personal example.
7. It also disallowed the ringing of church bells and services in daytime in some rural settings from May to the end of October under the pretext of field work requirements.

The government adopted many methods of creating situations that allowed for churches or seminaries to be legally closed (e.g. refusing to give permits for building repair, and then shutting down churches on grounds they were unsafe).

Anti-religious education and anti-religious propaganda were intensified as well as improved. Stalin's legacy of tolerating the church after 1941 was criticized as a break with Lenin.

In 1960, The Central Committee brought back 'individual work' among believers, which was a concept used in the 1930s. This was a practice of atheist tutors (appointed by different public institutions including the CP, Komsomol, Znanie and trade unions) visiting known religious believers at their homes try to convince them to become atheists. In most cases the tutors were workmates of the believers. If the believer was not convinced, the tutor would bring it to the attention of their union or professional collectives, and the 'backwardness and obstinancy' of the specific believers were presented in public meetings. If this did not work, administrative harassment would follow at work or school, and the believers would often be subject to lower-paid jobs, blocking of promotion, or expulsion from college if the believer was in college. Teachers commonly physically punished believing schoolchildren.

The closure of churches and seminaries was actually reported in the Soviet media as reflecting a natural decline of people who followed religious faith.

The government in 1961 forbade clergy from applying any kind of disciplinary measures to the faithful. Priests were turned into the employees of the group of lay members who 'owned' the parish under the law. The state attempted to achieve more defections from clergy to atheism, although they would have little success.

Measures were introduced that interfered with the spiritual life of the church and worked to destroy its financial capacity. Clergy were watched in order to find instances where they could be arrested for breaking the law.

New public institutions were created to assist the anti-religious struggle. Laxity in the anti-religious struggle was criticized and methodology was discussed in conferences and other means.

Lower estimate stated that 50,000 clergy were executed between 1917 and the end of the Khrushchev era. The number of laity executed likely greatly exceeds this. Members of the church hierarchy were jailed or forced out, their places taken by docile clergy, many of whom had ties with the KGB.

== 1964–1970s ==
After Khrushchev's fall, Soviet writers began to cautiously question the effectiveness of his anti-religious campaign. They came to a general conclusion that it had failed in spreading atheism, and that it had only antagonized believers as well as pushed them underground, where they were more dangerous to the state. It had also drawn the sympathies of many unbelievers and indifferent people. The mass persecutions stopped after Khrushchev, although few of the closed churches would be re-opened, and the few that did matched those closed by local authorities.

The two main anti-religious serials, Yearbook of the Museum of History of Religion and Atheism and Problems of History of Religion and Atheism soon ceased publication. This may have reflected negative attitudes towards such dubious scholastic publications among the genuine scholars that were part of the institutions that produced these documents.

On November 10, 1964, the Central Committee of the CPSU made a resolution in which it reaffirmed previous instructions that actions that offend believers or do administrative interference in the church as unacceptable.

The principle of persecuting religion in order to spread atheism did not disappear, however, even if the methodology was re-examined after Khrushchev. Many of the secret, unofficial, instructions aimed at suppressing the Church were made into official laws during Brezhnev's control, which thereby legally legitimized many aspects of the persecutions.

One of the early signs of the change in policy were articles in the official press reported that there were millions of believers who supported communism, including particularly leftist religious movements in the west and third world (e.g. Liberation theology in Latin America), and that all religion should not be attacked.

The Academy of Social Sciences of the CPSU Central Committee was handed the function of publishing major studies on religion and atheism, which was work previously done by the Academy of Sciences. A new publication, 'Problems of Scientific Atheism', came to replace 'Problems of History and Atheism' in 1966. The new publication was less scholarly than the previous one and contained intellectually cruder criticism of religion.

In 1965 the two councils over religious affairs in the country were amalgamated into the Council for Religious Affairs (CRA). This new body was given official legislation that gave it dictatorial powers over the administration of religious bodies in the country (previously the two organizations that preceded it used such powers under unofficial instructions). Several years later, V. Furov, the CRA deputy head wrote in a report to the CPSU Central Committee, 'The Synod is under CRA's supervision. The question of selection and distribution of its permanent members is fully in CRA's hands, the candidacies of the rotating members are likewise coordinated beforehand with the CRA's responsible officials. Patriarch Pimen and the permanent members for the Synod work out all Synod sessions' agendas at the CRA offices ... and co-ordinate [with us] the final 'Decisions of the Holy Synod'.

The state did not permit the re-opening of seminaries right through to the end of the 1980s, however, it agreed to allow expansions of the three seminaries and two graduate academies in the country that were not closed.

The volume of anti-religious propaganda, in lectures, books, the press, articles, etc., generally decreased after 1964. The circulation, however, of the works that were printed would come to surpass what it had been under Khrushchev. There was not a lull in anti-religious propaganda, therefore, although the party documents of the time used less direct language in criticizing religion.

The tone of the anti-religious propaganda was lowered and became less vicious as it had been in previous years. This incurred some criticism by Pravda, which editorialized about a growing indifference to anti-religious struggle. Znanie was criticized for reducing its volume of anti-religious lectures.

The Komsomol was criticized in internal Komsomol and in party documents in the 1970s and 1980s for laxity in anti-religious work among youth. The resolution of the 15th Komsomol congress in 1966 resolved to create special republican and district Komsomol schools, modeled after party schools, as part of the renewal of ideology and atheism among Soviet youth.

In December 1971, the 'Philosophic Society of the USSR' was founded with the aim (rather than pursuing truth) of, 'an untiring atheistic propaganda of scientific materialism and... struggle against the revisionist tolerant tendencies towards religion, against all concessions to the religious Weltanschauung. This had followed from a 1967 CPSU Central Committee resolution.

While clergy who violated the law could be punished, there was never any legal penalty given to secular authorities who violated the Laws on Religious Cults.

Despite the decline in direct persecution, the Soviet media reported in the post-Khrushchev years that religious rites (e.g. weddings, baptisms and funerals) were on the decline as well as the actual number of people practicing religion. This was presented as a natural process, rather than a result of terror, harassment, threats or physical closures, as had characterized previous anti-religious work. The quality of the studies that found these figures was questioned by scholars, including even Soviet scholars implicitly.

The Soviet media attempted to popularize KVAT clubs (clubs of Militant Atheism) but they found little success anywhere except Latvia. Similar clubs found some success in the western Ukraine.

== Renewal of persecution in the 1970s ==
A more aggressive period of anti-religious persecution began in the mid-1970s, following upon the 1975 amendments to the 1929 anti-religious legislation and the 25th party congress. This resulted from growing alarm over indifference, especially among youth, towards the anti-religious struggle, as well as growing influences of the Church. Anti-religious propaganda was intensified. At the same time, the anti-religious propaganda came to increasingly distinguish between the supposed loyal majority of believers and the enemies of the state who occupied the fringes of religion. Priests and bishops who did not completely subordinate themselves to the state and/or who engaged in religious activities outside of the routine performance of religious rites, were considered to be enemies of the state. Bishops criticized for 'high religious activity' were moved around the country. The Council for Religious Affairs claimed to have gained control of the Patriarch's Synod, which was forced to co-ordinate its sessions and decisions with the CRA.

The church hierarchy could have no disciplinary powers. While the state allowed for freedom of sermons and homilies, this freedom was limited in that they could only be of an 'exclusively religious character' (in practice this meant that clergymen who preached against atheism and the state ideology were not protected). Lukewarm clergy were tolerated while clergy with a missionary zeal could be deregistered. People who were more highly educated or who occupied more important positions were subject to harsher harassment and punishment than those who were uneducated. Religious youth at colleges could sometimes be sent to psychiatric hospitals on grounds that only a person with a psychological disorder would still be religious after going through the whole anti-religious education.

In 1975 the CRA was given an official legal supervision role over the state (prior to this it had unofficial control). Every parish was placed at the disposal of the CRA, which alone had the power to grant registration. The CRA could arbitrarily decide on the registration of religious communities, and allow them to worship or not. This policy was accompanied by intimidation, blackmail and threat to the clergy, and as a whole it was meant to demoralize the Church.

The Soviet Constitution of 1977 was sometimes interpreted by authorities as containing a requirement for parents to raise their children as atheists. It was legally possible to deprive parents of their children if they failed to raise them as atheists, but these legal restrictions were only enforced selectively when the authorities chose to do so.

The methodology of anti-religious propaganda was refined and old methods were criticized, and participants were criticized for laxity. The CPSU Central Committee issued an important resolution in 1979 that called for stronger anti-religious propaganda. The CC issued another resolution in 1983 that promised for ideological work against religion to be the top priority of party committees on all level.

There were rumours in the late 1970s that a comprehensive scientific study was done by Pisarov that blatantly contradicted the official figures of people abandoning religion, but was never published for that reason.

The Church and state fought a propaganda battle over the role of the Church in Russia's history in the years leading up to the 1,000th anniversary of Russia's conversion to Christianity, observed in 1988.

By 1987 the number of functioning churches in the Soviet Union had fallen to 6,893 and the number of functioning monasteries to just 18.

== Penetration of churches by Soviet secret services ==
According to Mitrokhin Archive and other sources, the Moscow Patriarchate has been established on the order from Stalin in 1943 as a front organization of NKVD and later the KGB. All key positions in the Church including bishops have been approved by the Ideological Department of CPSU and by the KGB. The priests were used as agents of influence in the World Council of Churches and front organizations, such as World Peace Council, Christian Peace Conference, and the Rodina ("Motherland") Society founded by the KGB in 1975.

The future Russian Patriarch Alexius II said that Rodina has been created to "maintain spiritual ties with our compatriots" as one of its leading organizers. According to the archive and other sources, Alexius has been working for the KGB as agent DROZDOV and received an honorary citation from the agency for a variety of services. Priests have also recruited intelligence agents abroad and spied on the Russian diaspora. This information by Mitrokhin has been corroborated by other sources.

In a particularly damaging case exposed only by after the collapse of the Soviet Union, United States Army Reserve Colonel George Trofimoff, a senior military intelligence analyst descended from the Russian nobility, was recruited into spying for the KGB while stationed in West Germany during the 1970s by his foster brother Kyr Irenaeus (Susemihl), the Russian Orthodox Metropolitan bishop of Vienna and all Austria.

There were rumours that the KGB infiltration of the clergy even reached the point that KGB agents listened to confessions. According to Ruthenian Greek Catholic Church historian and biographer László Puskás, not all Moscow Patriarchate priests were willing to violate the absolute secrecy of the Confessional, but those who did were especially prized by the KGB, as they made it possible to blackmail Orthodox parishioners into becoming informants as well by using information drawn from that very source. László Puskás also writes that a very clear distinction must be drawn between those who collaborated and those who refused and accordingly paid a terrible price; while many Russian Orthodox priests and Hierarchs were definitely guilty of complicity in the religious persecution of their own Church, many other Russian Orthodox clergy, laity, and religious firmly and unreservedly belonged to "the Church of the Martyrs".

In the Roman Catholic Church, a particularly damaging espionage breach involved former Russicum seminarian Alexander Kurtna, a convert to the Byzantine Rite Catholicism from Estonian Orthodoxy. Following his expulsion by the Russicum's Rector in 1940, Kurtna worked, with only one interruption, between 1940 and 1944 as a translator for the Vatican's Congregation for the Eastern Churches. During those same years, Kurtna covertly spied for the Soviet NKVD, with devastating results for fellow Russicum alumni Walter Ciszek, Pietro Leoni, Ján Kellner, and many other underground priests and faithful. Kurtna, who was always loyal to the USSR, only started spying for Nazi Germany in 1943 because his handler, SS Obersturmbannführer Herbert Kappler, threatened otherwise to send Kurtna and his wife to a concentration camp. Kurtna, however, turned the tables on Kappler by stealing the codebooks from his office and passing them to the Soviets. Ironically, Kurtna was returned to the USSR after the Liberation of Rome and became a political prisoner in Norillag, a region of the Gulag located above the Arctic Circle.

Citing documents in both the Polish and East German secret police archives, as well as sources in both Western and former Soviet Bloc intelligence, as well as the Commission for the Prosecution of Crimes against the Polish Nation, Cold War intelligence historian John O. Koehler accused Fr. Jerzy Dąbrowski (d. 1990), the late former bishop of Gniezno, of spying for both the Polish SB and the Soviet KGB while studying art in Rome between 1961 and 1970. Fr. Dąbrowski was the source for highly valued information about the inner workings of the Second Vatican Council, which Fr. Dąbrowski extracted, based on careful coaching from his handlers behind the scenes, from the Polish delegation attending the council. As part of his research process, Koehler was able to acquire copies of Fr. Dąbrowski's spy reports on Vatican II from the Stasi Records Agency. According to Fr. Dąbrowski's sources, the council had been called at the urging of anti-Communist Catholic clergy in West Germany, with the intentions of both strengthening the Church internally and going upon the offense in response to the global rise of both Marxism and Communism. Fr. Dąbrowski's reports on the council were considered so important that Yuri Andropov was briefed upon them immediately after taking command of the KGB in 1967 and cited them as grounds to order a mass offensive against the Catholic Church beginning in 1969. Even though the Second Vatican Council had allegedly been called to strengthen the Church as an ally of the Free World in the ongoing Cold War, after its completion, according to Koehler, the KGB was easily able to recruit moles inside every Department of the Roman Curia.

During the early 1970s, Koehler alleges that a highly placed mole inside the Vatican's diplomatic service was secretly recording conversations between Pope Paul VI and foreign dignitaries. In a particularly damaging case, a 22 February 1973 meeting between the Pope and an increasingly desperate South Vietnamese Foreign Minister Trần Văn Lắm was recorded, transcribed and shared with the North Vietnamese intelligence service. At the time, a north–south ceasefire was in effect, but Minister Trần was expressing to the Pope in vain the mounting terror of his government about what was seen as South Vietnam's abandonment by its allies. According to Koehler, who found a transcript of the conversation in the East German archives and confirmed its authenticity, "when this transcript reached Hanoi, the Communist leadership would not have harbored any doubts that their resumption of armed aggression would go unopposed by any Western Government."

In a chapter-long critique of both West German and Vatican Ostpolitik, Koehler documented how the Czechoslovak StB was able in the early 1970s to successfully plant a ceramic statue of the Blessed Virgin which contained a covert listening device inside the office of Vatican Secretary of State Cardinal Agostino Casaroli. A second listening device was located very close to the statue and was concealed inside an armoire. The operation was carried out with the assistance of the Cardinal's own nephew, Marco Torreta, who, according to Italian counterintelligence agents, had been an informant for the KGB since 1950. The intention was to compromise as much as possible the Cardinal's efforts to negotiate an end to the religious persecution of Catholics behind the Iron Curtain. Both listening devices proved extremely damaging, particularly due to the Cardinal's decades at his post. Both devices were only uncovered in 1990, as part of a massive investigation into the 1981 attempt on the life of Pope John Paul II which had been ordered by Italian investigative magistrate Rosario Priore. Both listening devices had still been transmitting all that time.

Koehler also alleges, based on detailed documentary material in both Polish and Soviet archives, that the 1981 assassination attempt by Mehmet Ali Ağca against Pope John Paul II was a Soviet intelligence operation which had been unanimously voted upon in advance by the Politburo, the ruling Central Committee of the Communist Party of the Soviet Union. In a document that still survives, all members of the Party Central Committee, including future Soviet Premier Mikhail Gorbachev, co-signed the orders.

== Glasnost ==
Beginning in the late 1980s, under Mikhail Gorbachev, the new political and social freedoms resulted in many church buildings being returned to the church, to be restored by local parishioners. A pivotal point in the history of the Russian Orthodox Church came in 1988 - the millennial anniversary of the Baptism of Kievan Rus'.

The Moscow Patriarchate successfully applied pressure in order to get revision of some of the anti-religious legislation. In January 1981, the clergy were requalified in their tax status from being taxed as a private commercial enterprise (as they were before) to being taxed as equal to that of medical private practice or private educators. This new legislation also gave the clergy equal property and inheritance rights as well as the privileges that were granted to citizens if they were war veterans. The parish lay organization of 20 persons who owned the parish was granted the status of a legal person with its appropriate rights and the ability to make contracts (the church had been deprived of this status by Lenin in 1918). For the first time in many years, religious societies could legally own their houses of worship. There was still some ambiguity left in this legislation, however, which allowed room for re-interpretation if the state wished to halt 'uncontrolled' dissemination of building new churches.

The religious bodies could still be heavily infiltrated by state agents, due to the power of local governments to reject elected parish officials and install their own people in the lay organization that owned the parish, which meant that even if they had ownership over their churches, it was still effectively in the state's hands. The largest gain of this new legislation, however, was that children of ten years of age and over could actively participate in religious ritual (e.g. service as acolytes, psalmists, in choirs) and that children of any age could be present inside a church during services as well as receive communion.

Professors at theological schools, and all clergy as well as laity working for the Department of External Ecclesiastical Relations of the Church were taxed similarly to all Soviet employees in recognition of their contribution to a positive Soviet image abroad.

The state's allowance of expansions to existing seminaries bore fruit, and by the early 1980s, the student population at these institutions had grown to 2,300 day and extramural students (it had been 800 in 1964).

Religious societies were given control over their own bank accounts in 1985.

This legislation in the 1980s marked a new attitude of acceptance towards religion by a state that decided that the best it could do was simply to minimize what it considered the harmful impact of religion. While the state tried to intensify persecution during the 1980s, the church came to see this increasingly as merely rearguard attacks by an ideologically bankrupt, but still physically powerful, enemy. The top party leaders refrained from direct involvement in the new offensive, perhaps due to an uncertainty over their potential success and a desire to have some manoeuvrability according to a desire to avoid antagonizing believers too much on the eve of the millennial anniversary of Russia's conversion to Christianity.

After the fall of the Soviet Union, the government of Russia to some extent openly embraced the Russian Orthodox Church, and there was a renaissance in the number of the faithful in Russia.

== See also ==
- Anti-Catholicism in the Soviet Union
- Religion in the Soviet Union
- Soviet anti-religious legislation
- Persecution of Christians

== Bibliography ==
- And God Created Lenin: Marxism vs. Religion in Russia, 1917–1929. Author : Paul Gabel ISBN 1-59102-306-8 And God Created Lenin: Marxism Vs. Religion in Russia, 1917-1929
- Storming the Heavens: The Soviet League of the Militant Godless Author : Daniel Peris Publisher: Cornell University Press ISBN 0-8014-3485-8 ISBN 978-0-8014-3485-3
- The Plot to Kill God: Findings from the Soviet Experiment in Secularization Author : Paul Froese Publisher: University of California Press ISBN 0-520-25529-1 ISBN 978-0-520-25529-6 The Plot to Kill God: Findings from the Soviet Experiment in Secularization
- Religion and the State in Russia and China: Suppression, Survival, and Revival Author : Christopher Marsh ISBN 1-4411-1247-2 ISBN 978-1-4411-1247-7
- Russian Society and the Orthodox Church: Religion in Russia after Communism Author : Zoe Knox Publisher: Routledge (August 13, 2009)ISBN 0-415-54616-8 ISBN 978-0-415-54616-4 Russian Society and the Orthodox Church: Religion in Russia after Communism
- "Godless communists": atheism and society in Soviet Russia, 1917-1932 Author : William Husband Publisher: Northern Illinois University Press ISBN 0-87580-257-5 ISBN 978-0-87580-257-2 "Godless Communists": Atheism and Society in Soviet Russia, 1917-1932
- Secularism Soviet Style: Teaching Atheism and Religion in a Volga Republic Author : Sonja Luehrmann Publisher: Indiana University Press ISBN 0-253-35698-9 ISBN 978-0-253-35698-7
- Doubt, Atheism, and the Nineteenth-Century Russian Intelligentsia Author : Victoria Frede Publisher: University of Wisconsin Press ISBN 0-299-28444-1 ISBN 978-0-299-28444-2 Doubt, Atheism, and the Nineteenth-Century Russian Intelligentsia
- After Atheism: Religion and Ethnicity in Russia and Central Asia (Caucasus World) Author : David C. Lewis Publisher: Palgrave Macmillan ISBN 0-312-22692-6 ISBN 978-0-312-22692-3 After Atheism: Religion and Ethnicity in Russia and Central Asia
- Russian Orthodoxy on the Eve of Revolution Author : Vera Shevzov Oxford University Press, USA ISBN 0-19-533547-3 ISBN 978-0-19-533547-7 Russian Orthodoxy on the Eve of Revolution
- The Heart of Russia: Trinity-Sergius, Monasticism, and Society after 1825 Author: Scott M. Kenworthy Oxford University Press, USA ISBN 978-0-19-973613-3
- State Secularism and Lived Religion in Soviet Russia and Ukraine Editor: Catherine Wanner Oxford University Press USA ISBN 978-0-19-993763-9
