= Bezbozhnik (rural locality) =

Bezbozhnik (Russian: Безбожник, lit. godless) is the name of several rural localities in Russia:

- Bezbozhnik, Bryansk Oblast, a settlement in Kozhanovsky Selsoviet of Gordeyevsky District of Bryansk Oblast
- Bezbozhnik, Chuvash Republic, a settlement in Ivankovo-Leninskoye Rural Settlement of Alatyrsky District of the Chuvash Republic
- Bezbozhnik, Kirov Oblast, a settlement in Bezbozhnikovsky Rural Okrug of Murashinsky District of Kirov Oblast
- Bezbozhnik, Novosibirsk Oblast, a village in Tatarsky District of Novosibirsk Oblast
