= Bezbozhnik u Stanka =

Soviet anti-religious magazine (1923–1931)

Bezbozhnik u Stanka (Безбожник у станка)
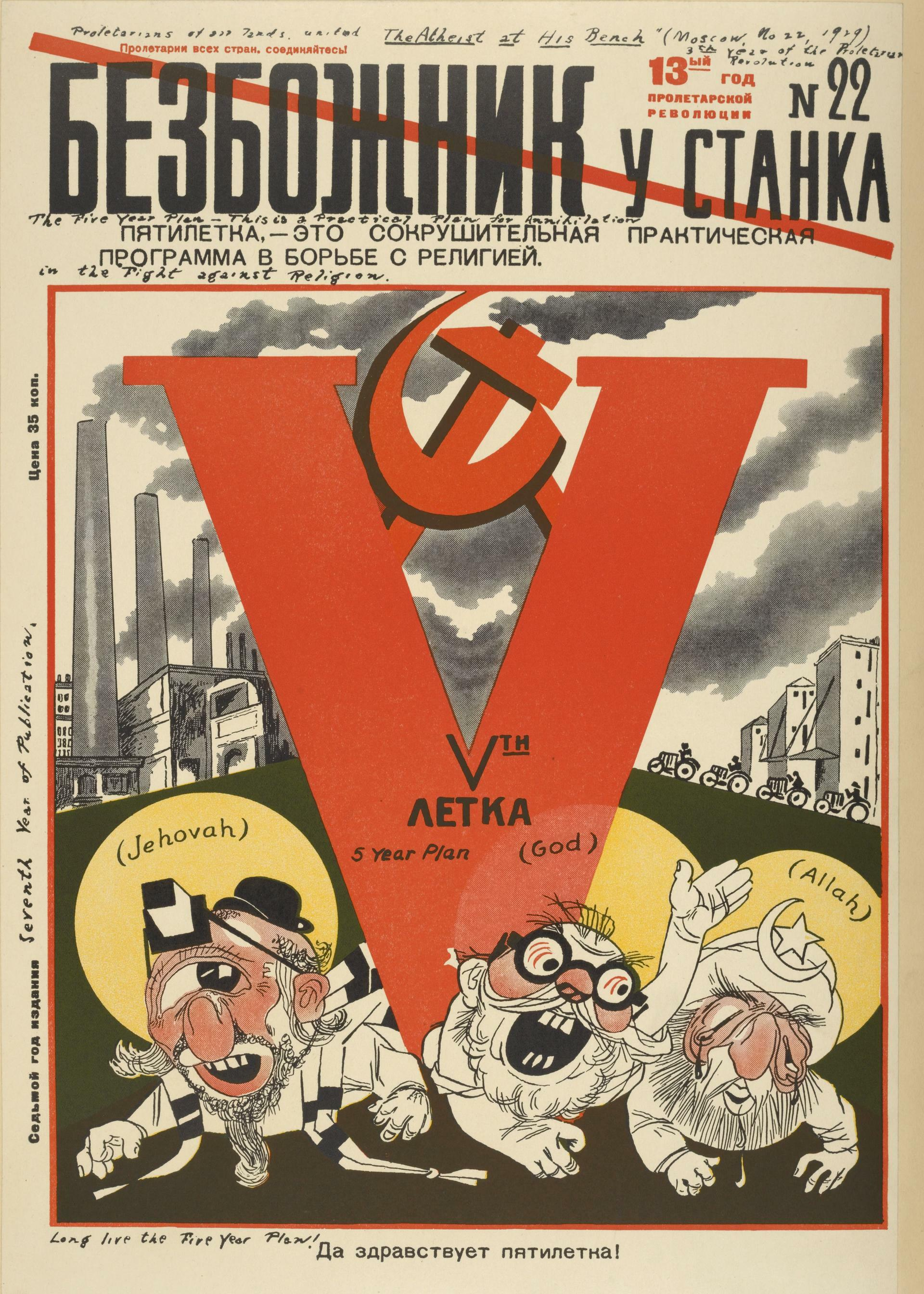
- Editor: Maria Kostelovskaya (1923—06.1928); Innokenty Stukov (07.1928—1931)
- Categories: Antireligious
- Frequency: Monthly
- Founded: 1923
- Final issue: 1931
- Country: Soviet Union
- Based in: Moscow
- Language: Russian

Bezbozhnik u Stanka (Russian: «Безбожник у станка», lit. 'The Godless at the Workbench') was a monthly and later biweekly antireligious magazine of the Moscow Committee of the AUCP(b). Published from December 1923 to 1931, it circulated roughly 35 thousand to 70 thousand copies per issue.

The magazine criticized religion from the point of view of Marxism. On its pages the questions of socialist construction, culture, anti-religious propaganda in the USSR were highlighted in a popular form, the connection of religious organizations with the exploiting classes was revealed. Criticism was directed at the Christian, Jewish, Muslim, Buddhist and other religions. The magazine had the following sections: 1) the class essence of religion, 2) religion and the class struggle abroad, 3) eastern religions, 4) in the camp of white emigrants, 5) the significance of religion in the USSR, as brakes on material and spiritual culture, 6) the reactionary role of religions in family life, 7) religion and class struggle under tsarism, 8) religion and revolution, 9) pioneer page, 10) methods of anti-religious propaganda, 11) materialism and idealism (religion), as two class systems of understanding of nature, human and social life, 12) questions and answers, 13) bibliography. The editor-in-chief of the magazine Bezbozhnik u Stanka was Maria Kostelovskaya.

The first edition of the Great Soviet Encyclopedia reports that the magazine from the moment of its appearance began to penetrate abroad, especially to America, and met with lively interest from the workers; 1924, in the House of Lords, the Archbishop of Canterbury protested against the distribution of the magazine in England, saying that the Bolsheviks "encroached on the highest achievement of human culture" – on religion; from the spring of 1925 the magazine in England was banned.

However, in publications and illustrations of the magazine, often brutal attacks against religion were made, which offended the religious feelings of believers. For this, the magazine has been criticized more than once in the party press and by party organizations.

== Examples of issues ==
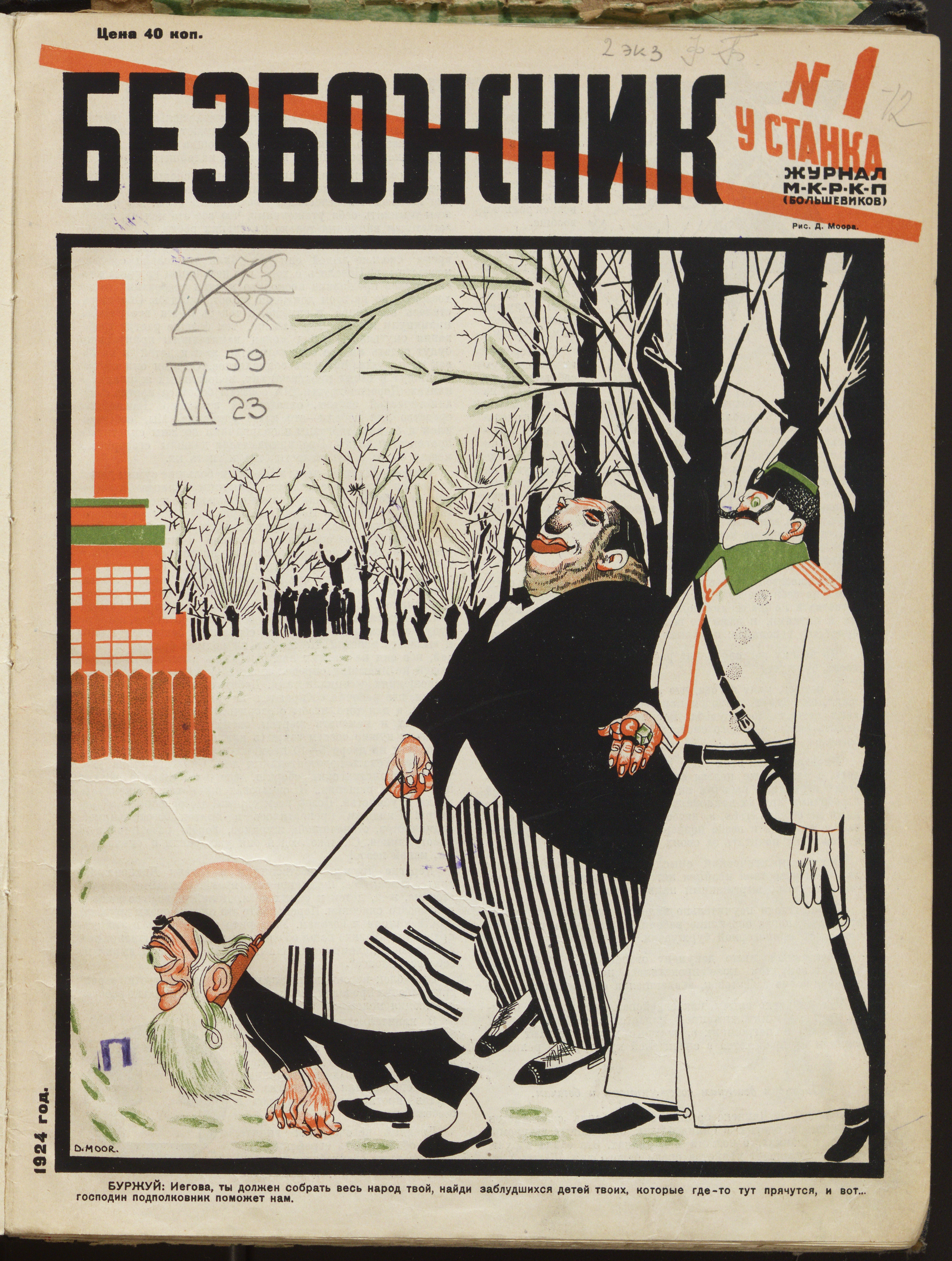
Jehovah is shown being used as a bloodhound.

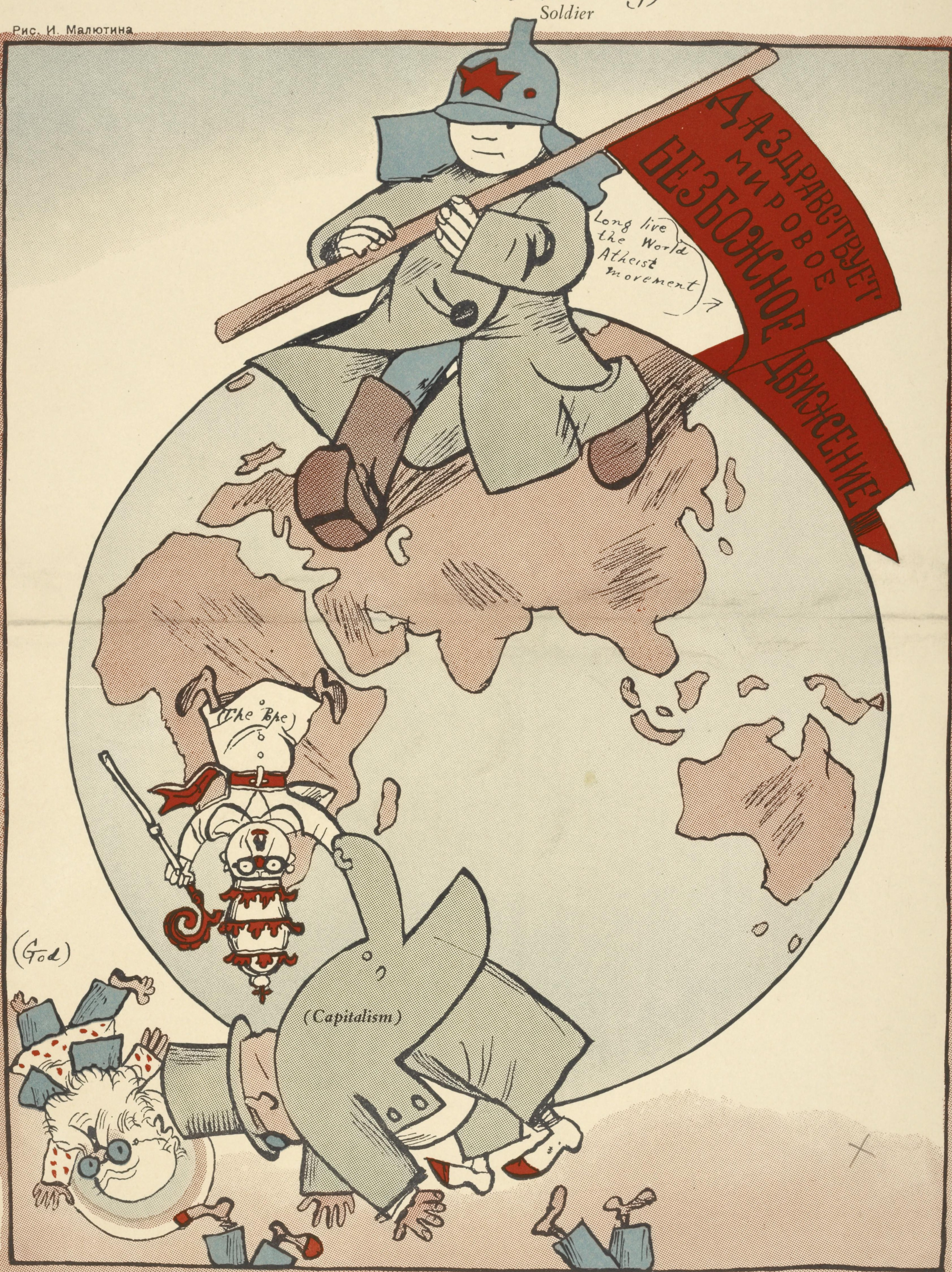
The child mascot of the magazine has knocked God, Capitalism, and the Pope off of the Earth.

== See also ==
- Bezbozhnik (newspaper)
- Council for Religious Affairs
- Religion in the Soviet Union
- State atheism
- USSR anti-religious campaign (1928–1941)

== Notes ==
- Atheistic Dictionary / [Абдусамедов А. И., Алейник Р. М., Алиева Б. А. и др.; под общ. ред. М. П. Новикова]. - 2-е изд., испр. и доп. - Москва : Политиздат, 1985. - 512 с.; 20 см / С. 51
- Siegelbaum, Lewis H. Soviet state and society between revolutions, 1918-1929 / Lewis H. Siegelbaum. - [Repr.]. - Cambridge [etc.] : Cambridge univ. press, 1994. - XIII, 284 с.; 23 см. - (Cambridge soviet paperbacks; 8).; ISBN 0-521-36987-8 (paperback)/ p. 161
