= Yemelyan Yaroslavsky =

Russian revolutionary and historian (1878–1943)

- Емельян Ярославский
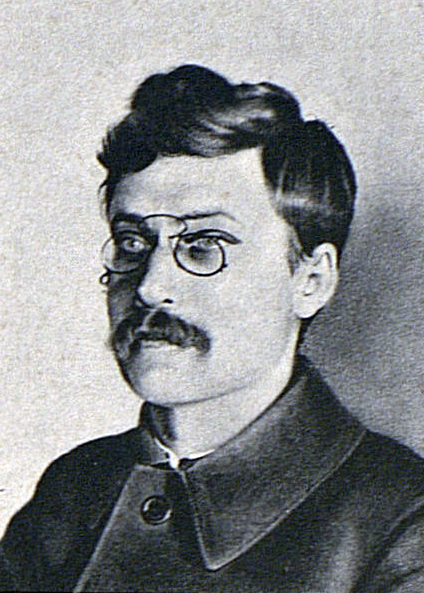
- Yaroslavsky in 1917

Member of the 10th Secretariat
- In office 16 March – 8 August 1921

Full member of the 10th, 18th Central Committee
- In office 22 April 1939 – 4 December 1943
- In office 16 March – 8 August 1921

Personal details
- Born: Minei Israilevich Gubelman; 3 March [O.S. 19 February] 1878 Chita, Russian Empire
- Died: 4 December 1943 (aged 65) Moscow, Russian SFSR, Soviet Union
- Resting place: Kremlin Wall Necropolis, Moscow
- Party: RSDLP (1898–1903); RSDLP (Bolsheviks) (1903–1918); Russian Communist Party (1918–1943)

Yemelyan Mikhailovich Yaroslavsky (Russian: Емелья́н Миха́йлович Яросла́вский, born Minei Izrailevich Gubelman, Мине́й Изра́илевич Губельма́н; 3 March [O.S. 19 February] 1878 – 4 December 1943) was an Old Bolshevik revolutionary, Communist Party functionary, journalist and historian.

An atheist and anti-religious polemicist, Yaroslavsky served as editor of the atheist satirical magazine Bezbozhnik (The Godless) and led the League of the Militant Godless organization. Yaroslavsky also headed the Anti-Religious Committee of the Central Committee. In his book How Gods and Goddesses Are Born, Live, and Die (1923), Yaroslavsky argued that religion was born under man, lived under man, and would die under man.

== Early years ==
Yemelyan Yaroslavsky was born on 3 March 1878, into a Jewish family as Minei Israilevich Gubelman in Chita, then the capital of Russia's Transbaikal Oblast, where his parents were political exiles. His first job was as a bookbinder.

Yaroslavsky joined the Russian Social Democratic Workers Party in 1898 and organized party cells on the Trans-Baikal (Zabaikalsky) Railroad. In 1901, he was a correspondent for the revolutionary newspaper "Iskra," and the following year became a member of the Party's Chita Committee. In 1903 he was arrested and put under police surveillance, but absconded to St. Petersburg Committee of the Russian Social Democratic Labour Party and a leader of its military wing, siding with the Social Democrats' Bolshevik faction during the intraparty split. He was arrested in April 1904, and spent eight months in prison, but was released on the outbreak of 1905 Revolution. During that year, he was an agitator in St Petersburg, Odessa, Tula, and Yaroslavl. In Odessa, he was arrested and spent four months in prison. In Yaroslavl, he organised a textile workers' strike – hence his pseudonym Yaroslavsky.

=== First wife ===
In 1903, Yaroslavsky married Olga Mikhailovna Genkina, a 21-year-old student at the Women's Medical Institute in St Petersburg, from which she was expelled after being caught in possession of revolutionary literature in February 1904. In 1905, the party sent her to Nizhny Novgorod, to organise textile workers. She was arrested but released when the crowd stormed the jail. The party then sent her to Ivanovo-Vosnesensk in November 1905, but she was intercepted at the station by the Black Hundreds, and killed. She was 24.

=== Party career in 1906–1921 ===
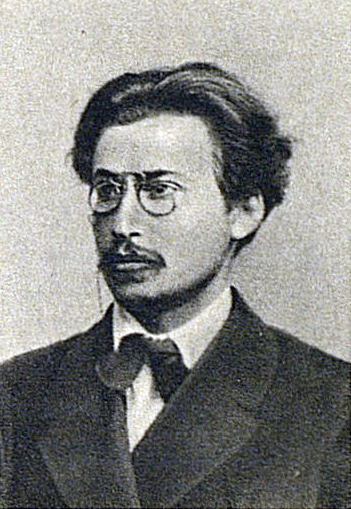
Yaroslavsky in 1906

Yaroslavsky was a delegate to the party conferences in Tammerfors (Tampere) in December 1905, Stockholm, in April 1906, and London, June 1907. After his return from London, he was arrested, held for 18 months, then sentenced to five years hard labour in the Gorny Zerentu Prison in the Nerchinsk region. When he had completed his sentence, in 1912, he was exiled to Eastern Siberia.

After the February revolution in 1917, he returned to Moscow, to edit a Bolshevik newspaper. In the months after the October Revolution of 1917, Yaroslavsky became associated with the Left Communist tendency, which opposed the negotiated settlement of military hostilities with the invading army of the German empire. Early in the Russian Civil War, he was a political commissar with the Red Army in Moscow. He supported the 'Military Opposition', who objected to the strategy deployed by the People' Commissar for War Leon Trotsky, which relied on professional army officers and set-piece battles, rather than guerilla tactics. The opposition is presumed to have been indirectly encouraged by Trotsky's rival, Josif Stalin. Later, Yaroslavsky was transferred to party organisation in Perm and Omsk. He was named a candidate member of the governing Central Committee of the Bolshevik Party in 1919 as a candidate member.

=== Party Secretary ===
Yaroslavsky's influence peaked in March 1921, after he had backed Lenin against Trotsky in a dispute over the role of trade unions. He was appointed one of three secretaries of the Central Committee of the Communist Party of the Soviet Union (Bolshevik) (CPSU {B}), and raised to full membership of that body. The senior secretary was Vyacheslav Molotov. Many years later, Molotov complained: "One moment, Yaroslavsky would request trousers for one person, another time it would be shoes for someone else. Trifles. True, the times were such that people were in need of everything. But attention had to be focused on major problems."

Molotov complained to Lenin, who had Yaroslavsky transferred to Siberia. On September 15, 1921, Yaroslavsky was the prosecutor at the trial in Novonikolaevsk, now Novosibirsk, of the counter-revolutionary Lieutenant General Roman von Ungern-Sternberg. However, he was back in Moscow in December 1921 for a party conference, at which – to Trotsky's lasting annoyance – he arranged that Grigory Zinoviev was billed as second in seniority to Lenin, with Trotsky third. He held the title of Central Committee secretary until April 1922, when Josif Stalin was appointed General Secretary, with Molotov as his deputy. Yaroslavsky retained his Central Committee membership until 1923 but never held a position as important as that of a party secretary.

=== Atheist activist ===
Late in 1922, Yaroslavsky created a new role for himself, as the Soviet Union's foremost anti-religious propagandist. He performed this function for nearly two decades, until the German invasion of the USSR when Stalin turned to the Russian Orthodox church for help in the war effort.

In the fall of 1922, the Central Committee of the Russian Communist Party established a new standing committee, the "Committee on the Execution of the Decree Separating Church and State" (unofficially known as the "Anti-Religious Commission"), granted "full authority in general leadership and policy in regard to religion and the church and development of party directives on issues of anti-religious propaganda." Although a body of limited power, the Anti-Religious Commission marked the first step towards an official Bolshevik policy of systematic religious extermination and anti-religious propaganda.

Trotsky claimed that Yaroslavsky was put in charge of this campaign while Lenin was absent through illness and that when he returned he rebuked Molotov for sanctioning it, saying: "Don't you know what Yaroslavsky is? It's enough to make a chicken laugh. He will never be able to manage this work."

Yaroslavsky's chaired the League of the Militant Godless, and edited its principal journal Bezbozhnik. At different times, he also edited other anti-religious periodicals.

=== Role in party disputes ===
In April 1923, Yaroslavsky was appointed Secretary of the Central Control Commission, the committee in charge of party discipline, and a member of the directing collegium of the Workers' and Peasants' Inspectorate (Rabkrin), a closely related monitoring agency which extended its purview outside of the party into the economic sphere. Over the course of his career as a Communist Party functionary, Yaroslavsky sat on the boards of several leading Soviet publications, including the Communist Party daily Pravda and the party theoretical journal Bolshevik.

He backed Stalin in all the factional disputes within the communist party that followed Lenin's incapacity and death. He appears to have been the first prominent communist to attack Trotsky personally, during a meeting of the Moscow party organisation, for which he was heckled by part of his audience. When Trotsky addressed the Central Committee for the last time in October 1927, before his expulsion, while others barracked and insulted him, Yaroslavsky threw a heavy book at his head.

In December 1925, after the rift between Stalin and Zinoviev, Yaroslavsky was part of the team sent to Leningrad to purge Zinoviev's supporters from the regional party, and made so provocative a speech that he was shouted down by Leningrad party members.

In an 8 March 1931 speech before the Communist Academy held in the aftermath of the 1931 Menshevik Trial, Yaroslavsky attacked David Riazanov, scholarly head of the Marx-Engels Institute and a former member of the Menshevik Party, for the allegedly insufficient number of Communist Party members employed at that archive and research center. Later that year the academy would officially condemn Riazanov as "an agent of counter-revolutionary Menshevism," leading to his arrest and exile outside of the city of Moscow.

In February 1937, when the two former party leaders Nikolai Bukharin and Alexei Rykov were arraigned before the Central Committee, prior to being arrested, put on trial and executed, Yaroslavsky denounced them as treasonous, and claimed that the charges against them were "totally proven".

== Historian ==
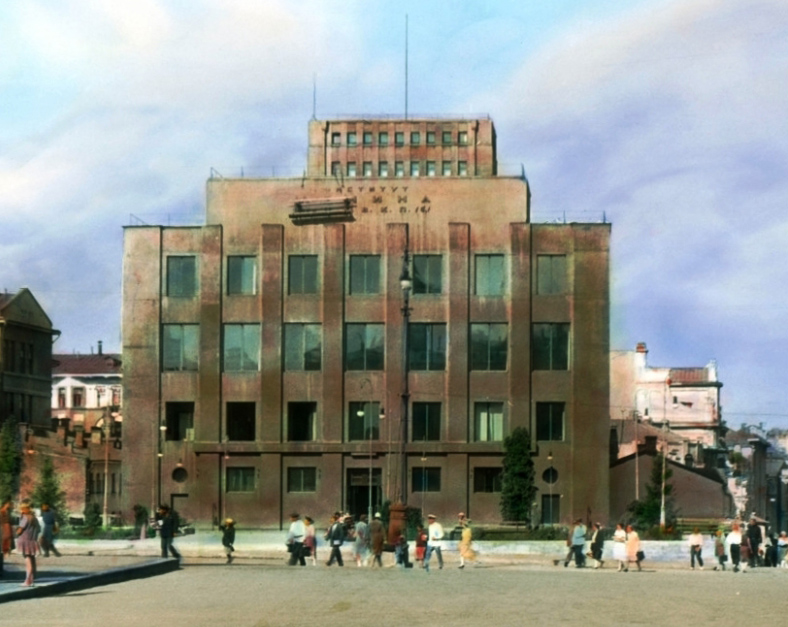
The Lenin Institute, archival repository and partisan historical research center, which Yaroslavsky helped supervise as a member of its directorate.

Yaroslavsky was an early biographer of Bolshevik leader V. I. Lenin with his first biography, Velikii vozhd' rabochei revoliutsii (The Great Leader of the Workers' Revolution) seeing print in 1918 in the aftermath of a failed assassination attempt. Yaroslavsky was subsequently chosen as a member of the directorate of the Lenin Institute, an archive and research center established in 1923 to gather and publish the various letters, manuscripts, and writings of Lenin. A second and more widely distributed Lenin biography by Yaroslavsky, Zhizn' i rabota V.I. Lenina (The Life and Work of V.I. Lenin), was rushed to the press in 1924, following Lenin's death.

Yaroslavsky was also a frequent writer on the history of the Bolshevik Party and an editor of one of the main historical journals of the 1920s, Istorik-Marksist (Marxist Historian). But changes in political conditions compelled him periodically to rewrite the record. In February 1923, Yaroslavsky wrote a long article on Trotsky's early career, covering 1900–1902, in which he declared that

the brilliant work of Comrade Trotsky as a writer and publicist has earned him the world-name of 'prince of pamphleteers'...We had before us a man profoundly devoted to the revolution, matured for the role of a tribune, with a tongue as sharp and flexible as steel...

The campaign to denigrate Trotsky began that same year. Writing in the 1930s, Trotsky claimed that "Yaroslavsky rose to his present position entirely by his slandering of me. As the official corrupter of the history of the party, he represents the past as an unbroken struggle of Trotsky against Lenin."

Yaroslavsky suddenly came under attack in 1931, when Stalin published an essay on the alleged mistakes made by historians and claimed that "even Comrade Yaroslavsky is not, unfortunately, an exception; his books on the history of the CPSU (B), despite all their merits, contain a number of errors in matters of principle and history." Stalin did not say what the 'errors' were, but others picked up the attack, accusing Yaroslavsky of being a Trotskyist, a Menshevik etc. He wrote several plaintive letters to Stalin but got no reply, so wrote a letter confessing to being in the wrong. He then wrote a new biography of Stalin that magnified his role in early Bolshevik history.

After the rise of Nazi Germany, and of Japanese expansionism, there was a sudden change in the demands made on historians. In the 1920s, the Soviet Union's most eminent historian had been Mikhail Pokrovsky, who had depicted Russia under the Tsars as an aggressor that persecuted smaller nations such as the Jews and Poles, and which shared the blame for the outbreak of war against France in 1812, Japan in 1905, and Germany in 1914. With the renewed threat of war, Stalin proposed to appeal to Russian nationalism and tales of military glory. In 1939, Yaroslavsky denounced Pokrovsky as a Trotskyite, saying that:

Pokrovsky ignored the indisputable fact that the army of Napoleon was crushed as a result of the heroic people's war against intervention...Pokrosky did not show the predatory aims of Japanese imperialism...Pokrovsky considered that the Russian landlords were the ones chiefly to blame for the (1914) war. Such a version was completely to the advantage of the German imperialists.

== Later years ==
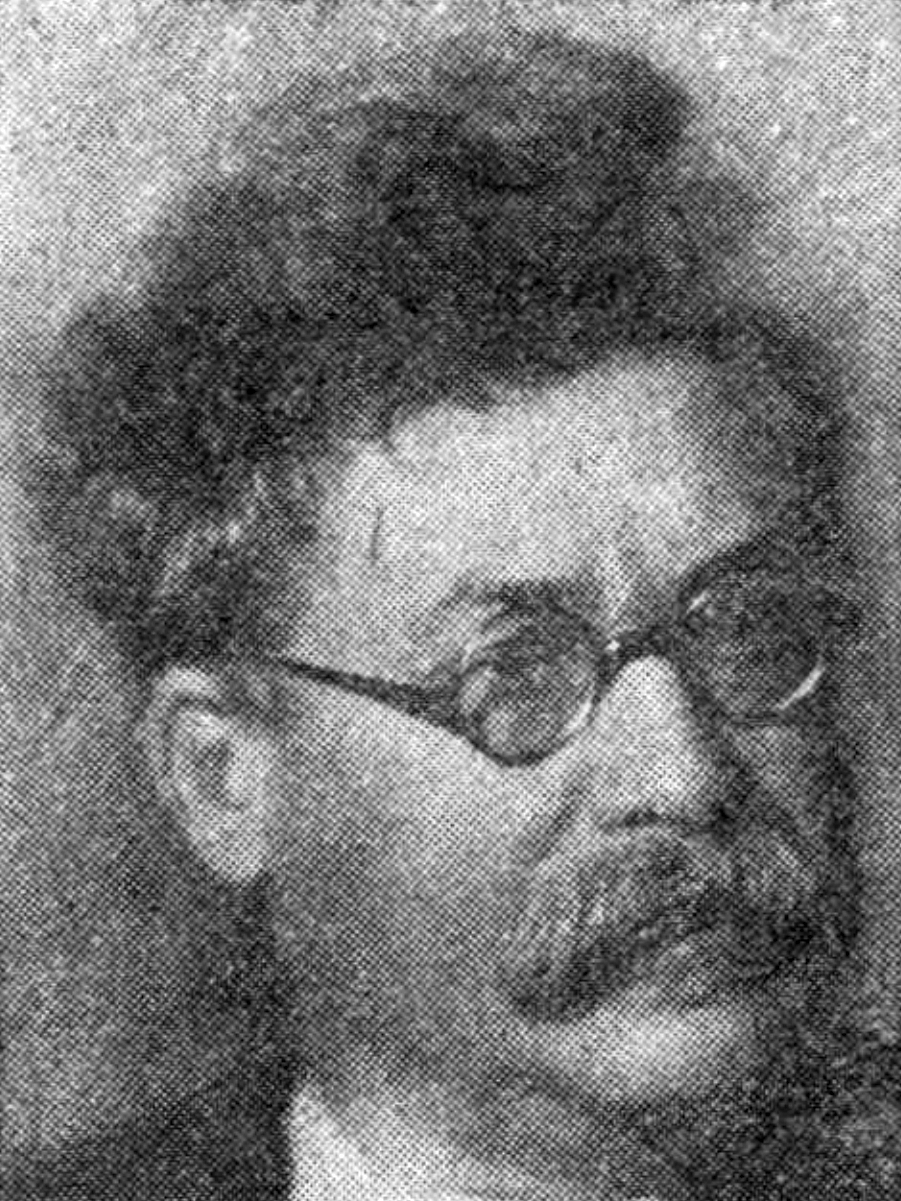
Yaroslavsky in 1931

Yaroslavsky was Chairman of the Society of Old Bolsheviks in 1931 until Stalin ordered the society's dissolution in 1935. He was also the head of the Society of Former Political Prisoners and Penal Exiles, a fraternal benefit society which aided Old Bolsheviks and other political prisoners of the Tsarist era. He was a member of the Party Control Commission in 1934–39. From 1939, he was a member of the Central Committee.

With the outbreak of the German–Soviet War, in the summer of 1941, the Soviet state reduced its anti-religious activities in an effort to make use of the Russian Orthodox Church as an institution to rally the population to defend the nation. The journals Bezbozhnik and Antireligioznik ceased publication and the League of the Militant Godless fell into obscurity.

Yaroslavsky, still an esteemed senior historian of the Bolshevik Party, dutifully promoted the government's new nationalistic political line, writing an article for Pravda entitled "The Bolsheviks – Continuers of the Best Patriotic Tradition of the Russian People" which declared the Bolsheviks the "lawful heirs to the Russian people's great and honorable past" and acknowledged the place of the Russian nationality "at the head of the other peoples of the USSR." Yaroslavsky's high-profile Pravda piece, along with a similar patriotic and nationalist article by Agitprop chief G. F. Alexandrov, was taken as an official signal to the historical profession to mine the imperial Russian past for examples of heroic unity and national defense which could be transformed into illustrative propaganda to aid the USSR in its attempt to combat the Nazi German invaders.

=== Death and legacy ===
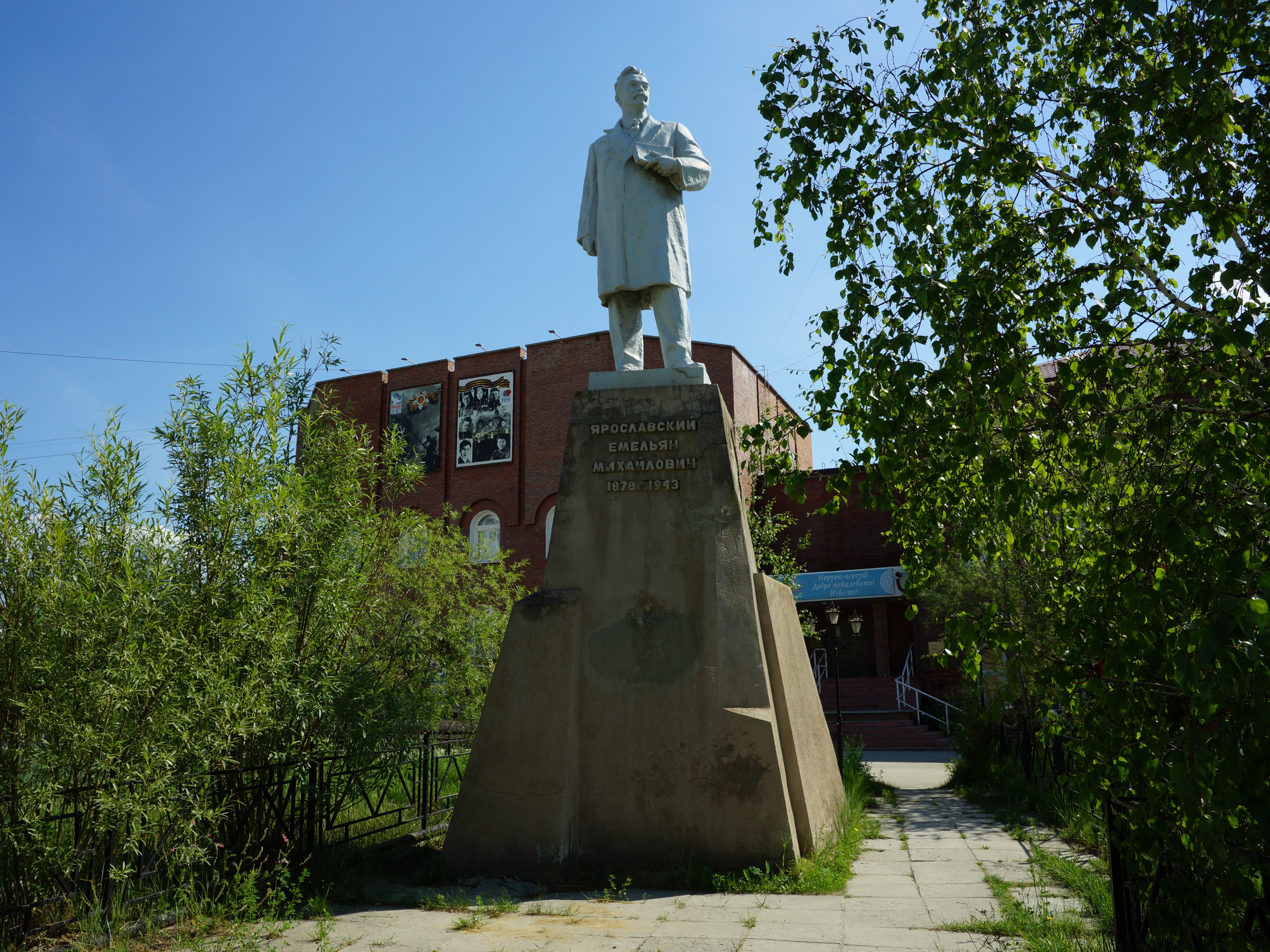
Monument to Yemelyan Yaroslavsky in Yakutsk

Yaroslavsky died on 4 December 1943 in Moscow of stomach cancer. His remains were cremated and the urn with his ashes was interred to the left side of the Senate Tower in the Kremlin Wall Necropolis behind Lenin's Mausoleum.

== Honours and awards ==
- Order of Lenin (1938)
- Stalin Prize, 1st class (1943) — For the collective research work entitled "History of the Civil War," Volume 2. (1942)

== Works in English ==
- How Gods and Goddesses are Born, Live, and Die. Moscow: Red Virgin Soil, 1923.
- The Bible for Believers and Non-Believers. Moscow: Red Virgin Soil, 1923–1925.
- Lenin: His Life and Work. Chicago: Daily Worker Publishing Co., n.d. [c. 1926].
- A Short History of the Russian Communist Party. In Two Volumes. Moscow: n.p., n.d. [1930s].
- Bolshevik Verification and Purging of the Party Ranks. Moscow: Cooperative Publishing Society of Foreign Workers in the USSR, 1933.
- Religion in the U.S.S.R. New York: International Publishers, 1934.
- History of Anarchism in Russia. New York: International Publishers, 1937.
- Meaning of the Soviet Trials. Contributor. New York: Workers Library Publishers, 1938.
- The Great Patriotic War of the Soviet People. Moscow, Foreign Languages Publishing House, 1941.
- Landmarks in the Life of Stalin. London : Lawrence & Wishart, n.d. [1942].
- Twenty-five Years of Soviet Power. London: Hutchinson & Co., 1943.

== See also ==
- Outline of the Russian Revolution and Civil War
- Bibliography of the Russian Revolution and Civil War
- Bibliography of Stalinism and the Soviet Union
- Index of Old Bolsheviks
- Index of articles related to the Russian Revolution and Civil War
