= Voinstvuiuschii ateizm =

Antireligious monthly magazine in 1931 in the USSR

Voinstvuiuschii ateizm (Воинствующий атеизм, Der kämpfende Atheismus, Militanta ateismo)
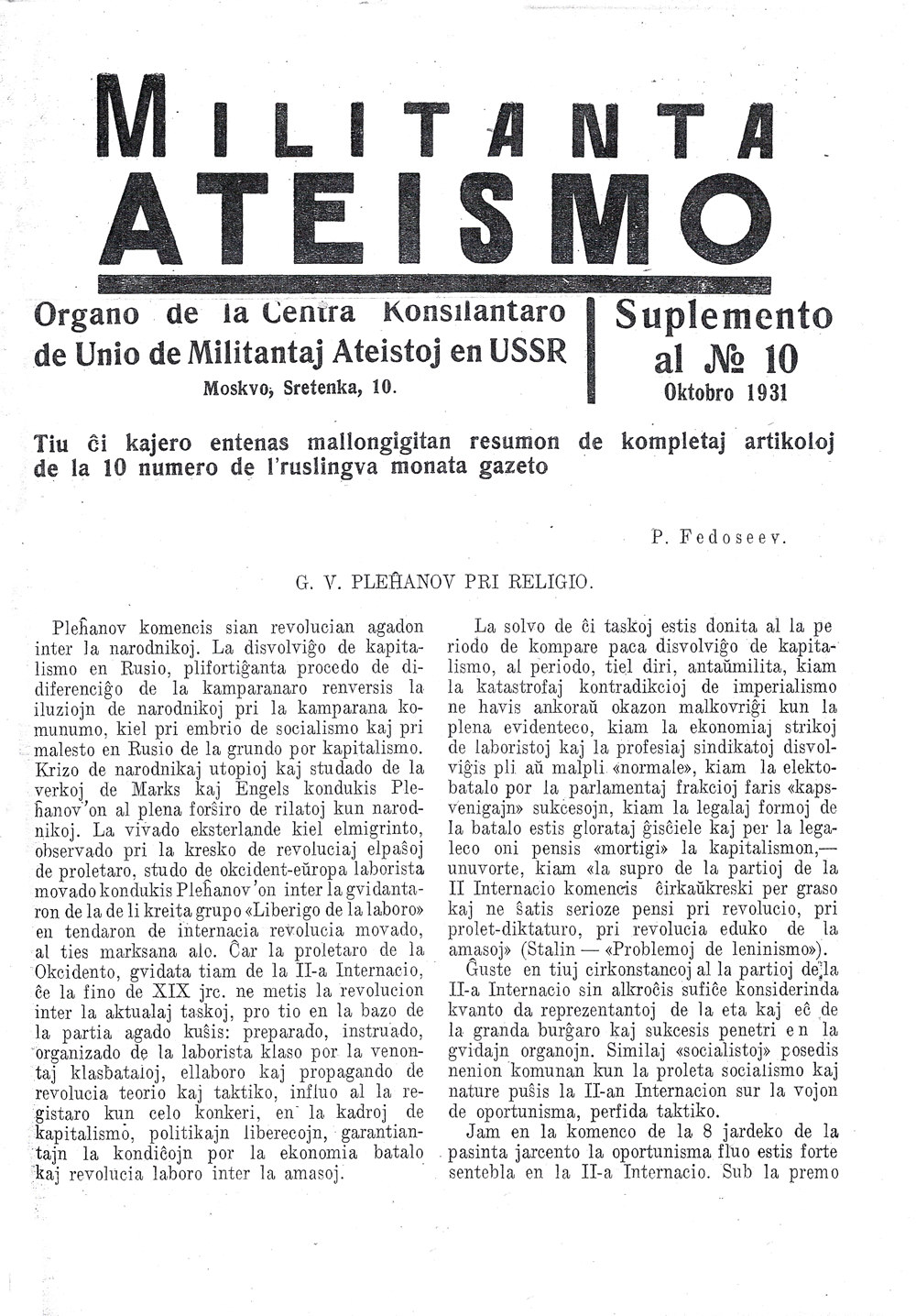
- Editor: P. A. Krasikov
- Categories: antireligious
- Frequency: Monthly
- Founded: January, 1931
- Final issue: December, 1931
- Country: Soviet Union/Russia
- Based in: Moscow
- Language: Russian, German, Esperanto

Voinstvuiuschii ateizm (Russian: «Воинствующий атеизм»; German: «Der kämpfende Atheismus»; Esperanto: «Militanta ateismo»; lit. «Militant Atheism») was an antireligious monthly magazine in Russian, German, and Esperanto, which was published from January to December 1931, in the USSR.

The League of Militant Atheists began publishing the magazine Voinstvuiuschii ateizm in 1931. The magazine was the organ of the Central Council of the League of Militant Atheists of the USSR. P. A. Krasikov became the editor-in-chief of the magazine. This magazine was a replacement for the magazine Ateist. The editorial board of the journal included Y. M. Yaroslavsky, F. M. Putintsev, A. A. Ivanovskii, E. D. Krinitsky, A. T. Lukachevsky, N. M. Matorin, A. Nyrchuk, V. N. Ralcevic, I. A. Shpitsberg (responsible secretary). The magazine published articles on various issues of Marxist atheism, criticism of bourgeois theories of the origin of religion, the history of atheism and free-thinking, as well as the experience of atheistic education.

The circulation of the magazine was 5,500 copies. The publishing house of the magazine was in Moscow, on Sretenka Street, 10.

Dimitry Pospielovsky believes that the "scholarship" of the magazine did not fare very well, and in 1932, it was swallowed up by the magazine Antireligioznik.

== See also ==
- Bezbozhnik (newspaper)
- Council for Religious Affairs
- Persecutions of the Catholic Church and Pius XII
- Persecution of Christians in the Soviet Union
- Persecution of Muslims in the former USSR
- Religion in the Soviet Union
- State atheism
- USSR anti-religious campaign (1928–1941)
