= Fedor Oleshchuk =

Soviet journalist and writer, anti-religious author, lecturer-propagandist

Fedor Nestorovich Oleshchuk (Russian: Федор Несторович Олещук; 1898–1975) was a Soviet journalist and writer, anti-religious author, lecturer-propagandist.

== Biography ==
The Priest's Son. In 1917, as a 19-year-old youth, he came to work at the Zamoskvoretsky District Soviet of Workers' Deputies. Member of the Russian Communist Party (b) since 1921. On April 1, 1926, he was appointed head of the publishing house «Bezbozhnik» (newspaper and magazine). He was a propagandist, agitator, worker of Agitprop of the Moscow Party Committee. 17 years of his work activity are connected with the League of Militant Atheists. He was the responsible secretary, then the deputy chairman of its Central Council and at the same time the deputy editor-in-chief of the magazine «Antireligioznik». From 1942 to 1947 he worked in the party.

After the death of Yemelyan Yaroslavsky in 1943, he became acting chairman of the League of Militant Atheists and held this post until the end of the latter’s existence in 1947. And since 1947 — on the Board of the All-Union Society «Znanie». Oleshchuk is one of the organizers of the magazine «Nauka i religiya», in 1959—1962 he was a member of the editorial board and deputy editor-in-chief. He wrote many brochures and articles on issues of atheism and international life. Already in retirement, he did not break ties with the editorial board and with propaganda activities.

Oleshchuk wrote the article «League of Militant Atheists» in the first edition of the Great Soviet Encyclopedia and the article Anti-religious propaganda in the second edition of the Great Soviet Encyclopedia. In addition to Russian, his books were published in Greek, German, Hungarian, Bulgarian, Spanish, French and English.

== Published works ==
- Что такое Союз безбожников. - Москва : акц. изд. о-ва "Безбожник", [19--] (тип. изд. "Крестьянская газета"). - 32 с.; 15х11 см. - (Материалы для массовой работы в избах-читальнях, клубах и красных уголках/ Союз безбожников СССР и Главполитпросвет).
- Чтения о Рождестве : [Сборник статей] / Под ред. Политпросвета ЦК РЛКСМ. - Москва; Ленинград : Молодая гвардия, 1925. - 34 с. : ил.; 16 см. - (Библиотека деревенской молодежи).
- Кулак и поп враги батрачества / Ф. Олещук; Обложка: А.; Центр. ком-т Профсоюза сельхозлесрабочих СССР. - Ленинград; Москва : Гос. изд-во, 1928 (М. : 3-я тип. Транспечати). - 38, [2] с.; 17х13 см.
- Школа и воспитание активных атеистов / Ф. Олещук; Под ред. В. Н. Ральцевича. - Ленинград; Москва : Московский рабочий, [1928] ("Мосполиграф" 14-я тип.). - 125 с., [3] с. объявл.; 17х13 см.
- В поход на бога / Ф. Олещук. - Ленинград; Москва : Гос. изд-во, 1929 (М. : 6 типо-лит. Транспечати). - 53, [1] с.; 17х12 см.
- Как работать деревенской ячейке СВБ / Ф. Олещук. - Москва : Безбожник, 1929 ("Мосполиграф", 14-я тип). - 123, [3] с., [2] с. объявл. : ил., диагр.; 15х11 см. - (Популярная антирелигиозная библиотека/ Под общ. ред. А. Лукачевского и Вл. Сарабьянова. Центр. совет Союза воинствующих безбожников).
- Кто строит церкви в СССР / Ф. Олещук. - Ленинград; Москва : Московский рабочий, [1929] ("Мосполиграф" 14-я тип.). - 96 с. : ил.; 17х12 см. - (Библиотечка воинствующего атеиста/ Под ред. В. Н. Ральцевича).
- Кто такие сектанты / Ф. Олещук. - Ленинград; Москва : Гос. изд-во, 1929 (М. : тип. "Красный пролетарий"). - 46 с., [2] с. объявл.; 16х12 см. - (Библиотека "Простые беседы").
- Что решил Второй Всесоюзный съезд воинствующих безбожников / Ф. Олещук; Центр. совет Союза воинствующих безбожников СССР. - Москва : Безбожник, 1929 ([тип. "Гудок"]). - 64 с.; 16х11 см.
- Школа и воспитание активных атеистов / Ф. Олещук. - 2-е изд., доп. - Ленинград; Москва : Московский рабочий, [1929] (14 тип. Мосполиграф). - 128 с.; 17х13 см. - (Библиотечка воинствующего атеиста/ Под ред. В. Н. Ральцевича). — РГБ
- В поход на бога / Ф. Олещук. - 2-е изд., испр. и доп. - Ленинград; Москва : Гос. изд-во, 1930. - 60, [3] с.; 16 см.
- Как бороться с религией / Ф. Н. Олещук. - [Москва] : Безбожник, 1930 (тип. изд-ва. "Дер эмес"). - 62, [2] с.; 17х12 см. - (Цикл лекций/ Воскресный антирелигиозный ун-т. Общ. ред. В. Л. Сарабьянова. Центр. сов. Союза воинствующих безбожников СССР).
- Как работать деревенской ячейке СВБ / Ф. Олещук; Обложка: П. К.; Центр. совет Союза воинствующих безбожников. - 2-е изд., испр. и доп. - Москва : Безбожник, 1930 (тип. "Гудок"). - 113 с., из них 1 с. на обл. : ил., диагр.; 18х13 см.
- Кулак и поп враги батрачества / Ф. Олещук; ЦК Проф. союза сельхозлесрабочих СССР. - 2-е изд., доп. и перераб. - Ленинград; Москва : Гос. изд-во, 1930 (М. : тип. "Красный пролетарий"). - 45, [2] с.; 19х14 см.
- Непрерывка и религия / Ф. Олещук. - Москва : Госиздат РСФСР Московский рабочий, 1930 (Центр. полигр. школа ФЗУ им. т. Борщевского). - 63 с.; 18х13 см. - (Непрерывное производство/ Под ред. Л. М. Сабсовича и Ю. А. Шауэра).
- Пасха и крестовый поход / Ф. Олещук. - Ленинград; Москва : Гос. изд-во, 1930 (М. : тип. "Рабочий коммунар"). - 46 с.; 17х11 см. - (Библиотека безбожника).
- Пятилетие Союза воинствующих безбожников / Ф. Олещук; Центр. совет Союза воинствующих безбожников СССР. - Москва : Безбожник, 1930 (Л. : гос. тип. им. Евг. Соколовой). - 24 с.; 21х15 см.
- Социалистическое соревнование и задачи безбожников : (Стенограмма доклада на активе Моск. орг-ции и СВБ) / Ф. Олещук; Центр. сов. Союза воинствующих безбожников СССР. - Москва : Безбожник, 1930 (тип. изд-ва "Дер эмес"). - 56, [6] с., [2] с. объявл.; 15х11 см.
- Что такое Союз воинствующих безбожников / Ф. Олещук. - 2-е изд. - Москва : Безбожник, 1930 (тип. "Гудок"). - 32 с.; 14х11 см.
- Антипасхальный сборник для деревни / Под ред. Ф. Олещука; Центр. совет Союза воинствующих безбожников СССР. - Москва; Ленинград : Моск. рабочий, 1931. - 80 с.; 22 см.
- Антипасхальный сборник для деревни / Под ред. Ф. Олещука; Центр. совет Союза воинств. безбожников СССР. - 2-е изд., стер. - Москва; Ленинград : Моск. рабочий, 1931. - 80 с.; 22 см.
- Безбожник лицом к производству / Ф. Олещук. - Москва : Безбожник, 1931 (тип. "Гудок"). - 29, [2] с.; 15х10 см. - (Библиотека безбожника-активиста/ Под ред. Ф. Н. Олещука. Центр. совет Союза воинств. безбожников СССР; № 1).
- Безбожники, лицом к третьему решающему : Доклад об итогах III пленума ЦС СВБ на Нижег. краев. съезде СВБ / Ф. Олещук; Центр. совет Союза воинств. безбожников СССР. - Москва; Ленинград : Огиз - Моск. рабочий, 1931 (М. : 13-я тип. Огиза). - 30, [2] с.; 17х12 см.
- Безбожники на лесах новостроек / Ф. Олещук; Центр. совет Союза воинств. безбожников СССР. - Москва; Ленинград : Огиз - Моск. рабочий, 1931 (М. : тип. "Гудок"). - 32 с.; 14х11 см.
- Борьба с религией - борьба за социализм / Ф. Олещук. - Москва : изд. и тип. изд-ва ВЦСПС, 1931. - 62, [2] с.; 18х13 см.
- Буржуазно-кулацкая пасха / Ф. Олещук. - Москва; Ленинград : Огиз - Моск. рабочий, 1931 (М. : 13-я тип. Огиза). - 43 с., 3 с. объявл.; 17х11 см.
- Об уклонах на антирелигиозном фронте / Ф. Олещук. - Москва; Ленинград : Огиз - Моск. рабочий, 1931 (М. : 13-я тип. Огиза). - 40 с.; 15х10 см. - (Библиотека городского безбожника-активиста/ Под ред. Ф. Н. Олещука. Центр. совет Союза воинств. безбожников СССР; 5).
- Правда про церковь и религию / Ф. Олещук. - Москва; Ленинград : Гос. изд-во, 1931 (М. : тип. "Красный пролетарий"). - 109, [2] с.; 18х14 см. — РГБ
- Религия и классовая борьба / Ф. Олещук. - Москва; Ленинград : Гос. изд-во, 1931 [на обл.: 1930] (М. : тип. изд-ва "Дер эмес"). - 77, [2] с.; 17х11 см. - (Что должен знать рабочий, вступающий в ВКП(б)).
- Gottlose mit dem gesicht zur produktion : Aus dem russischen / F. Oleschtschuk. - Pokrowsk : Deutscher staatsverlag, 1931 (druck. des ZVWR der ASRR d. Wolgadeutschen). - 23 с.; 19х14 см. - (Bibliothek des gottlosen).
- Ο κυλακον κι ο ποπας ινε εχθρι τυ πατρακ : Перевод: Георгиади Иракли / Φ. Ολεςςυκ. - Ростов-Дон : Издание греческого издательства «Коммунистис», 1931. - 47 с.; 17 см.
- Wie kampft man gegen die religion? : Leitfaden fur die praktische antireligiose arbeit in stadt und dorf in den verhaitnissen des verstarkten sozialistischen vormarschen mit einem fronten / F. N. Oleschtschuk; Uebersetzung aus dem russischen mit einem vorwort von Rudolf Ondratschek. - Pokrowsk : Zentral-volker-verlag des Bundes der SRR : Abteilung fur den Unteren Wolgagau, 1931 (druck. des ZVWR der ASRR d. Wolgadeutschen). - 52 с.; 20х14 см.
- Учебник для ячейковых организаторов СВБ : (Для города) / Под ред. Ф. Олещука; Центр. совет Союза воинств. безбожников СССР; [В составлении учебника принимали участие... Агиенко, Головкин, Гольцева]. - Москва; Ленинград : Огиз - Моск. рабочий, 1931 (М. : тип. изд-ва "Дер эмес"). - 182 с., 2 с. объявл.; 23х15 см.
- Кулацкое рождество / Ф. Олещук; Центр. совет Союза воинств. безбожников СССР. - [Москва] : Огиз - Моск. рабочий, 1931 (тип. изд-ва "Дер эмес"). - 32 с.; 17х13 см.
- Антирелигиозная кампания в деревне / М. Попов. - Москва; Ленинград : Огиз - Моск. рабочий, 1931 (М. : тип. "Гудок"). - 29, [2] с., 1 с. объявл.; 14х10 см. - (Библиотека деревенского безбожника-активиста/ Центр. совет Союза воинств. безбожников СССР. Под ред. Ф. Н. Олещука; 2).
- За новый быт/ А. Агиенко. - Москва; Ленинград : Огиз - Моск. рабочий, 1931 (М. : тип. изд-ва "Дерэмес"). - 30, [2] с.; 16х12 см. - (Библиотека городского безбожника-активиста/ Под ред. Ф. Н. Олещука. Центр. совет Союза воинств. безбожников СССР; 4).
- Как выращивать актив / Н. Соколов. - Москва; Ленинград : Огиз - Моск. рабочий, 1931 (М. : 13-я тип. Огиза). - 32 с.; 15х10 см. - (Библиотека деревенского безбожника-активиста/ Под ред. Ф. Н. Олещука. Центр. совет Союза воинств. безбожников СССР).
- Антирелигиозный уголок в избе-читальне / Ю. Коган. - Москва; Ленинград : Огиз - Моск. рабочий, 1931 (М. : 13-я тип. Огиза). - 29, [2] с.; 14х10 см. - (Библиотека деревенского безбожника-активиста/ Центр. совет Союза воинств. безбожников СССР. Под ред. Ф. Н. Олещука; 3).
- Антирелигиозная работа стенной газеты / Д. Е. Михневич. - Москва; Ленинград : Огиз - Моск. рабочий, 1931 (М. : 13 тип. Огиза). - 30 с., 2 с. объявл. : объявл.; 17х12 см. - (Библиотека городского активиста-безбожника/ Под ред. Ф. Н. Олещука. Центр. совет Союза воинств. безбодников СССР).
- Как ячейке СВБ составить план работы / М. Попов. - Москва; Огиз; Ленинград : Моск. рабочий, 1930 [на обл.: 1931] (М. : тип. "Гудок"). - 30 с., 1 с. объявл.; 14х10 см. - (Библиотека городского безбожника-активиста/ Центр. совет Союза воинств. безбожников СССР. Под ред. Ф. Н. Олещука; 3).
- Безбожники на соцстройке : (Опыт ячейки на заводе "Электропровод") / Л. Игнатьев. - Москва; Ленинград : Огиз - Моск. рабочий, 1931 (М. : тип. "Гудок"). - 32 с.; 15х11 см. - (Библиотека городского безбожника-активиста/ Под ред. Ф. Н. Олещука. Центр. совет Союза воинств. безбожников СССР; 2).
- Как работать с безбожной газетой и журналом / К. Журбицкий, В. Дубчук. - Москва; Ленинград : Огиз - Моск. рабочий, 1931 (13-я тип. Огиза). - 32 с.; 14х10 см. - (Библиотека деревенского безбожника-активиста/ Центр. совет Союза воинств. безбожников СССР Под ред. Ф. Н. Олещука; 1).
- Как работать с безбожной газетой и журналом / К. Журбицкий, В. Дубчук. - Москва; Ленинград : Огиз - Моск. рабочий, 1931 (13-я тип. Огиза). - 32 с.; 14х10 см. - (Библиотека деревенского безбожника-активиста/ Центр. совет Союза воинств. безбожников СССР Под ред. Ф. Н. Олещука; 1).
- За безбожное ударничество : (Опыт работы безбожников заводов им. Петровского и Ленина) / Г. Левентант. - Москва; Ленинград : Огиз - Моск. рабочий, 1931 (тип. изд-ва "Дер эмес"). - 30 с., 1 с. объявл.; 15х11 см. - (Библиотека городского безбожника-активиста/ Под ред. Ф. Н. Олещука. Центр. совет Союза воинств. безбожников СССР; 12).
- Борьба с религией на водном транспорте / С. Н. Малиновкин. - Москва; Ленинград : Огиз - Моск. рабочий, 1931 (М. : 13-я тип. Огиза). - 29, [2] с.; 18х12 см. - (Библиотека городского безбожника-активиста/ Под ред. Ф. Н. Олещука. Центр. совет Союза воинств. безбожников СССР; 11).
- Работа безбожника в колхозе / П. Федосеев. - Москва; Ленинград : Огиз - Моск. рабочий, 1931 (М. : 13-я тип. Огиза). - 31 с., 1 с. объявл.; 16х11 см. - (Библиотека деревенского безбожника-активиста/ Под ред. Ф. Н. Олещука. Центр. совет Союза воинств. безбожников СССР; 5).
- Против религиозных праздников / Д. Брауде. - Москва; Огиз; Ленинград : Моск. рабочий, 1931 (М. : 13-я тип. Огиза). - 32 с.; 15х11 см. - (Библиотека городского безбожника-активиста/ Центр. совет Союза воинств. безбожников СССР. Под ред. Ф. Н. Олещука; 9).
- За новый быт / М. Кривохатский. - Москва; Ленинград : Огиз - "Моск. рабочий", 1931 (М. : тип. "Дер эмес"). - 40 с.; 15х11 см. - (Библиотека деревенского безбожника-активиста/ Центр. совет Союза воинств. безбожников СССР. Под ред. Ф. Н. Олещука; 4).
- Антирелигиозная работа в жактах / А. Штраус-Одинокий. - [Москва] : Огиз - Моск. рабочий, [1931] (13-я тип. Огиза). - 30, [2] с.; 15х11 см. - (Библиотека безбожника-активиста. Для города/ Под ред. Ф. Н. Олещука; № 10).
- Радио на борьбу с религией / М. Шамбадал. - Москва; Ленинград : Московский рабочий, 1932. - 63 с.; 15 см. - (Библиотека деревенского безбожника активиста/ Под ред. Ф. Н. Олещука. Центр. сов. Союза воинствующих безбожников СССР; № 8).
- XVII партконференция и задачи антирелигиозной работы / Ф. Н. Олещук; Центр. совет Союза воинств. безбожников СССР. - Москва : Гос. антирелигиозное изд-во, 1932 (тип. "Гудок"). - Обл., 38, [2] с., включ. тит. л.; 19х13 см.
- Подготовка и организация доклада / Вл. Сарабьянов; Предисловие: Ф. Олещук. - Москва; Ленинград : Огиз - Моск. рабочий, 1931 (М. : 13-я тип. Огиза). - 27, [2] с., 3 с. объявл.; 17х11 см. - (Библиотека городского безбожника-активиста/ Под ред. Ф. Н. Олещука. Центр. совет Союза воинств. безбожников СССР; 8).
- Работа с безбожной газетой на фабрике / Н. Инцертов. - Москва; Ленинград : Огиз - Моск. рабочий, 1931 (М. : 13-я тип. Огиза). - 39 с., 1 с. объявл.; 15х11 см. - (Библиотека городского безбожника-активиста/ Под ред. Ф. Олещука, Центр. совет Союза воинств. безбожников СССР; 6).
- XVII партконференция и задачи антирелигиозной работы / Ф. Н. Олещук; Центр. совет Союза воинств. безбожников СССР. - 2-е изд. - Москва : Гаиз, 1932 (типо-лит. им. Воровского). - Обл., 34, [2] с.; 22х15 см.
- Борьба против религии на новом этапе / Ф. Олещук; Центр. совет Союза воинств. безбожников СССР. - Москва : Гаиз, 1933 (тип. "Гудок"). - Обл., 110, [2] с.; 15х11 см.
- Строительство социализма и преодоление религии : (К антирождественской кампании) / Ф. Олещук; Центр. совет Союза воинств. безбожников СССР. - Москва : Гаиз, 1933 (тип. "Гудок"). - Обл., 64 с.; 17х13 см.
- Религиозное и антирелигиозное движение в СССР и за границей : Сборник статей В. Мащенко, В. Шишакова, С. Урсыновича, Евг. Беляева, Люциана Климовича, Н. Завадской, И. Флерова / Под ред. Ф. Н. Олещука; Центр. заоч. антирелигиозный ин-т НКП РСФСР. - Москва : Гаиз, 1933 ("Образцовая" тип.). - Обл., 120 с.; 22х15 см.
- Небо религии и небо науки : (Проблема межпланетных сообщений) : Пояснит. текст к серии диапозитивов / Автор М. Искринский; Консультант по науч. разделу инж. М. К. Тихонравов; Ред. Ф. Н. Олещук; Центр. совет Союза воинств. безбожников СССР. - Москва : НКП - Главучтехпром, 1936 (Ф-ка № 7 "Диафото", тип. "Диафото"). - 24 с.; 13x9 см.
- Как работают и живут в безбожном колхозе : [Колхоз им. Маторина. Ленингр. обл.] / Коллектив авторов: Барышев... Огрызко... Перлов... [и др.; Предисл.: Ф. Олещук]; Центр. совет Союза воинст. безбожников СССР. Ленингр. гос. антирелигиозный музей. - Москва : Гаиз, 1933 (тип. "Гудок"). - Обл., 52 с.; 20х13 см.
- XVII съезд ВКП(б) и задачи антирелигиозной работы / Ф. Н. Олещук; Центр. совет Союза воинств. безбожников СССР. - Москва : Гаиз, 1934 (17 ф-ка нац. книги треста "Полиграфкнига"). - Обл., 100, [3] с.; 18х12 см. — Электронная библиотека ГПИБ
- Чей праздник рождество / Ф. Н. Олещук. - Москва : Гаиз, 1935 (17 ф-ка нац. книги треста "Полиграфкнига"). - Обл., 74, [2] с.; 19х13 см.
- X лет Союза воинствующих безбожников СССР / Ф. Олещук; Центр. совет Союза воинств. безбожников СССР. - Москва : Гаиз, 1936 (17 ф-ка нац. книги треста "Полиграфкнига"). - Обл., 80 с.; 19х13 см.
- Против религиозных праздников - за новый быт : (Пояснит. текст к серии диапозитивов на кинопленке) / Автор Н. В. Румянцев; Ред. Ф. Н. Олещук; Центр. совет Союза воинств. безбожников СССР. - [Москва] : 5 тип. Трансжелдориздата, [1936]. - 20 с.; 14х11 см.
- О задачах антирелигиозной пропаганды / Ф. Олещук. - Москва : ГАИЗ, 1937 (тип. "Кр. воин"). - Обл., 33 с., 2 с. объявл.; 17х13 см.
- О реакционной роли мусульманского духовенства / Ф. Олещук. — Алма-Ата : Партиздат, 1937. — 28 с. : 16 см.
- Выборы в Советы трудящихся и антирелигиозная пропаганда : [Сборник]. - Сталинград : Обл. кн-во, 1937 (т.-л. из-ва "Сталингр. правда"). - Обл., 68 с.; 17х13 см.
- О религиозных праздниках / Ф. Олещук; Союз воинств. безбожников Крым. АССР. - [Симферополь] : Гос. изд. Крым. АССР, 1937 (1 тип. Крымполиграфтреста). - 16 с.; 17х13 см.
- О сектантстве / Ф. Олещук. - ст. Основа : изд. и Тип. газ. "Електропромінь", 1937. - Обл., 22 с., без тит. л.; 20, 5х14, 5 см.
- Против религии : [Сборник статей]. - Саратов : Сарат. обл. изд., 1937 (тип. Облместпрома). - 56 с., без тит. л., 1 с. "Оглавление" на обл.; 22х15 см.
- Сталинская Конституция и вопросы религии. - Москва : типо-стеклогр. Промтреста Куйбышев. района, 1937. - Тит. л., 11 с.; 28х29 см. - (Микрофонные материалы Всесоюзного радиокомитета : Исключительно для радиовещания. Редакция "В помощь самообразованию" № 59).
- Антирелигиозная пропаганда и стенная газета в колхозе / Ф. Н. Олещук; Крестьян. газ. Заоч. курсы ред. колхоз. и бригадных стенгаз. - [Москва] : тип. изд-ва "Крестьян. газ.", [1937]. - Обл., 39 с., без тит. л. : ил.; 22х15 см. - (Заочные курсы редакторов колхозных и бригадных стенгазет / Лекции выпускаются под общ. ред. С. Б. Урицкого).
- Антирелигиозная пропаганда и стенная газета в колхозе. - 2-е изд., перераб. - Москва : Изд. и тип. изд-ва "Крестьян. газ.", 1938. - 33 с., без тит. л.; 22 см. - (Задание/ "Крестьян. газ.", Заоч. курсы ред. колхоз. и бригадных стенгазет; Задание 5).
- Выборы в советы депутатов трудящихся и антирелигиозная пропаганда. - [Москва] : Мол. гвардия, 1938 (Тип. им. Сталина). - 64 с.; 17 см.
- Ленин и Сталин о религии : На правах рукописи / Ф. Н. Олещук. - Москва : [б. и.], 1938. - 7 с.; 30 см. - (Микрофонные материалы Всесоюзного радиокомитета. Исключительно для радиовещания. Для Сектора агитации и пропаганды; № 106).
- Молодежь и религия / Ф. Олещук. - Москва : Гаиз, 1938 (18 тип. треста "Полиграфкнига"). - 56 с.; 22 см.
- Происхождение и классовая сущность пасхи. - [Москва] : Моск. рабочий, 1938 (13 тип. Мособлполиграфа). - 24 с.; 19 см. - (В помощь пропагандисту и агитатору-антирелигиознику).
- Происхождение пасхи : На правах рукописи / Авт. Олещук. - Москва : [б. и.], 1938. - 7 с.; 30 см. - (Микрофонные материалы Всесоюзного радиокомитета. Исключительно для радиовещания. Для Сектора агитации и пропаганды/ Глав. ред. ВРК; № 48).
- Разоблачим предвыборные маневры церковных мракобесов. - Москва : Моск. рабочий, 1938 (Тип. изд-ва "Дер эмес"). - 24 с.; 19 см. - (В помощь пропагандисту и агитатору-антирелигиознику).
- Диверсанты в рясах : сборник статей. / Деревянкин, И. Г.; Лаврушин, И. Я.; Юрин, А.; Олещук, Ф. - Горький : Обл. изд-во, 1938 ([Тип.] Полиграфа). - 64 с.; 20 см. — РГБ
- Выборы в советы депутатов трудящихся и задачи антирелигиозной пропаганды : Сборник / Ем. Ярославский, Ф. Олещук, М. Шейнман. - Москва : ГАИЗ, 1939. - 72 с.; 21 см.
- Легенда о рождестве Христовом. - Сталинград : Обл. кн-во, 1939. - 32 с. Без тит. л.; 14 см. - (В помощь агитатору и пропагандисту).
- Играло ли христианство в истории человечества прогрессивную роль : [Перер. стеногр. лекции]. - [Москва] : Моск. рабочий, 1940. - 44 с.; 20 см.
- Религиозные пережитки среди трудящихся СССР и пути их преодоления. - Сталинград : Обл. кн-во, 1940 (Астрахань). - 40 с.; 20 см.
- Der Kampf der Kritische gegen das Volk / F. Oleschtschuk. - Kiew : Staatsverl. der nationalen Minderheiten der USSR, 1940. - 164 с.; 17 см.
- Борьба церкви против народа. - Москва : Воениздат, 1941 (Ленинград). - 140 с.; 20 см. - (Антирелигиозная библиотека).
- О преодолении религиозных пережитков. - Москва : ГАИЗ, 1941. - 40 с.; 20 см.
- "Марксизм-ленинизм о религии и борьбе с ней" : (Беседа) : На правах рукописи / Ф. Н. Олещук. - Москва : [б. и.], 1941. - 7 с.; 30 см. - (Микрофонные материалы Всесоюзного радиокомитета : Исключительно для радиовещания. Для Сектора пропаганды и агитации; № 36).
- Партия большевиков - авангард советского народа / Ф. Олещук. - Пенза : изд. и типолит. изд-ва газ. "Сталинск. знамя", 1945. - 19 с.; 14 см. - (Библиотечка агитатора и пропагандиста).
- Борьба демократических сил за окончательный разгром фашизма : Стенограмма публ. лекции, прочит. 17-го июня 1946 г. в Круглом зале Дома Союзов в Москве / Ф. Н. Олещук; Всесоюз. лекц. бюро при Министерстве высш. образования СССР. - Москва : Правда, 1946 (тип. им. Сталина). - 32 с.; 21 см.
- Демократические преобразования в освобожденных странах Европы : Стенограмма публичной лекции, прочит. 23 мая 1946 г. в Лекционном зале в Москве / Ф. Н. Олещук; Всесоюз. лекционное бюро при М-ве высшего образования СССР. - Москва : [б. и.], 1946. - 31 с.; 21 см.
- Наша цель - коммунизм / Ф. Олещук. - Москва : Гос. изд-во полит. лит., 1946. - 39 с.; 20 см.
- Партия большевиков - авангард советского народа / Ф. Олещук. - Москва : Правда, 1946. - 45 с.; 16 см.
- Наша цель - коммунизм / Ф. Олещук. - Брянск : Брян. рабочий, 1947 (тип. Облупр. полиграфии и изд-в). - 28 с.; 21 см.
- Наша цель - коммунизм / Ф. Олещук. - [Воронеж] : Воронеж. обл. книгоизд-во, 1947 (тип. "Коммуна"). - 36 с.; 20 см.
- Наша цель - коммунизм / Ф. Н. Олещук. - Иваново : Ивгиз, 1947. - 52 с.; 19 см.
- Наша цель - коммунизм / Ф. Н. Олещук. - Москва : Правда, 1947. - 47 с.; 20 см. - (В помощь слушателю политшколы).
- Наша цель - коммунизм / Ф. Н. Олещук. - Москва : Воен. изд-во, 1947 (тип. им. Тимошенко). - 40 с.; 22 см. - (В помощь руководителю политических занятий / Гл. полит. упр. Вооруж. Сил СССР).
- Наша цель - коммунизм / Ф. Н. Олещук. - Москва : Воен. изд-во, 1947. - 38 с.; 22 см. - (В помощь руководителю политических занятий / Гл. полит. упр. Вооруженных Сил Союза ССР).
- Наша цель - коммунизм / Ф. Олещук. - Орел : Изд-во газ. "Орлов. правда", 1947 (Тип. "Труд"). - 35 с.; 20 см.
- Партия большевиков - авангард советского народа / Ф. Олещук. - Астрахань : изд-во и тип. газ. "Волга", 1947. - 39 с.; 20 см.
- 1 мая 1947 года : (Материалы в помощь пропагандисту и агитатору) / Ф. Олещук, З. Фазин. - [Б. м.] : изд-во и тип. "Волж. коммуна", 1947. - 19 с.; 20 см.
- СССР в борьбе за мир / Ф. Н. Олещук. - [Москва] : Госполитиздат, 1947 (тип. "Кр. пролетарий"). - 80 с.; 20 см.
- Историческото значение на Октомврийската социалистическата революция / Ф. Н. Олещук. Три десет годишният юбилей на СССР и тридесетгодишната на провокационната дейност на неготовите противници (1917-1947) / Е. Тарле. - София : Съюз на българо-съветските дружества, 1947. - 19 с.; 21 см.
- Наука и религия / Ф. Н. Олещук. - Казань : Татгосиздат, 1948 (кн. ф-ка им. Камиль Якуб). - 36 с.; 20 см.
- Международное обозрение : Стенограмма публичной лекции, прочит. 18 марта 1950 г. в Центр. лектории О-ва в Москве / Ф. Н. Олещук; Всесоюз. о-во по распространению полит. и науч. знаний. - Москва : [б. и.], 1950. - 28 л.; 30 см.
- A vallás a tudomány tükreben / P. Kolonyickij, F. Olescsuk. - 2-ik kiadás. - Budapest : Szikra, 1952. - 44 с.; 19 см. - (Marxista ismeretek kiskönyvtára. Filozófia, politikai gazdaságtan, társadalomtudomány; 118).
- Материал к лекции на тему "Международное обозрение" / Всесоюз. о-во по распространению полит. и науч. знаний. - Москва : [б. и.], 1956. - 24 с.; 21 см.
- Неизбежна ли война. - Москва : Госполитиздат, 1956. - 64 с.; 20 см.
- La guerre est-elle fatale? / F. Olechtchouk. - Moscou : Éditions en langues étrangères, 1957. - 54 с.; 19 см.
- ¿Es inevitable la guerra? / F. Oleschuk. - Moscú : Ed. en lenguas extranjeras, 1957. - 70 с.; 19 см.
- Is war inevitable? / F. Oleshchuk. - Moscow : Foreign languages publ. house, 1958. - 63 с.; 19 см.
- Пропаганда атеизма в лекциях по международному положению : (Метод. материалы к лекции) / О-во по распространению полит. и науч. знаний РСФСР. - Москва : [б. и.], 1960. - 23 с.; 20 см.
- Война и мир . - Москва : Моск. рабочий, 1964. - 54 с.; 17 см.
