= Bezbożnik wojujący =

Soviet anti-religious magazine (1929–1935)

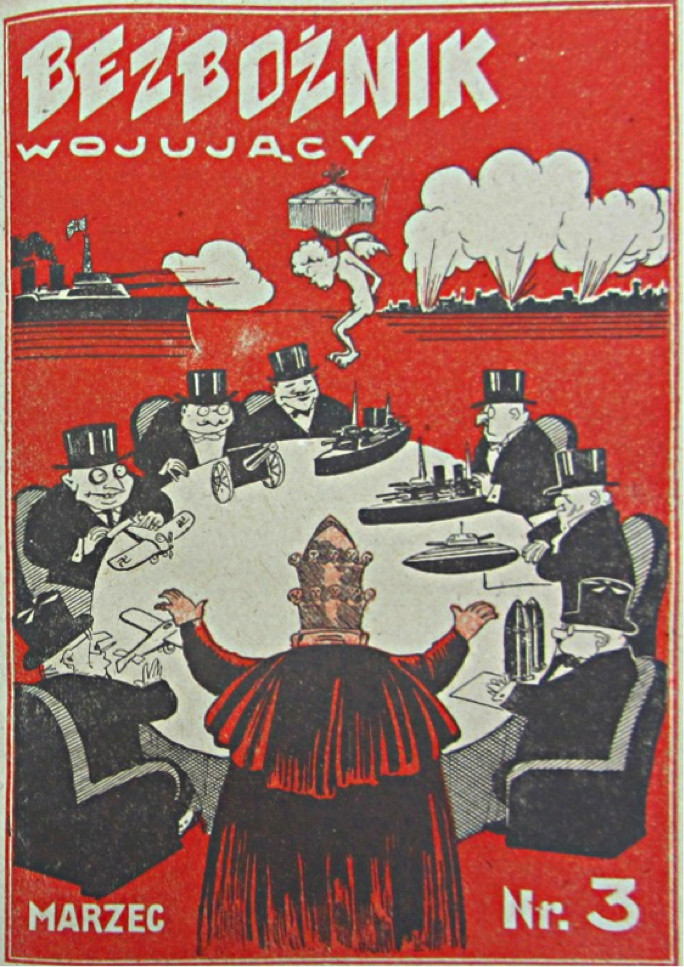
- Cover of Bezbożnik wojujący magazine, №3
- Editor: Bolesław Przybyszewski
- Categories: Anti-religious
- Publisher: SVB
- Founded: December 1929
- Final issue: June 1935
- Country: Soviet Union
- Based in: Moscow
- Language: Polish

Bezbożnik wojujący (Russian: Воинствующий безбожник; translation of the name: Militant Godless) was an anti-religious magazine in the Polish language. It was the publication of the Anti-Catholic Section at the Central Soviet of the League of Militant Atheists.

The magazine was published in Moscow. The editor-in-chief of the magazine was Bolesław Przybyszewski.

== Notes ==
- Российская национальная библиотека. Bezbożnik Wojujący
- Biblioteka Narodowa. Bezboznik wojujący
