= Erdem ba Shazhan =

Soviet antireligious magazine (1928–1934)

Erdem ba Shazhan (ᠡᠷᠳᠡᠮ ᠱᠠᠰᠢᠨ)
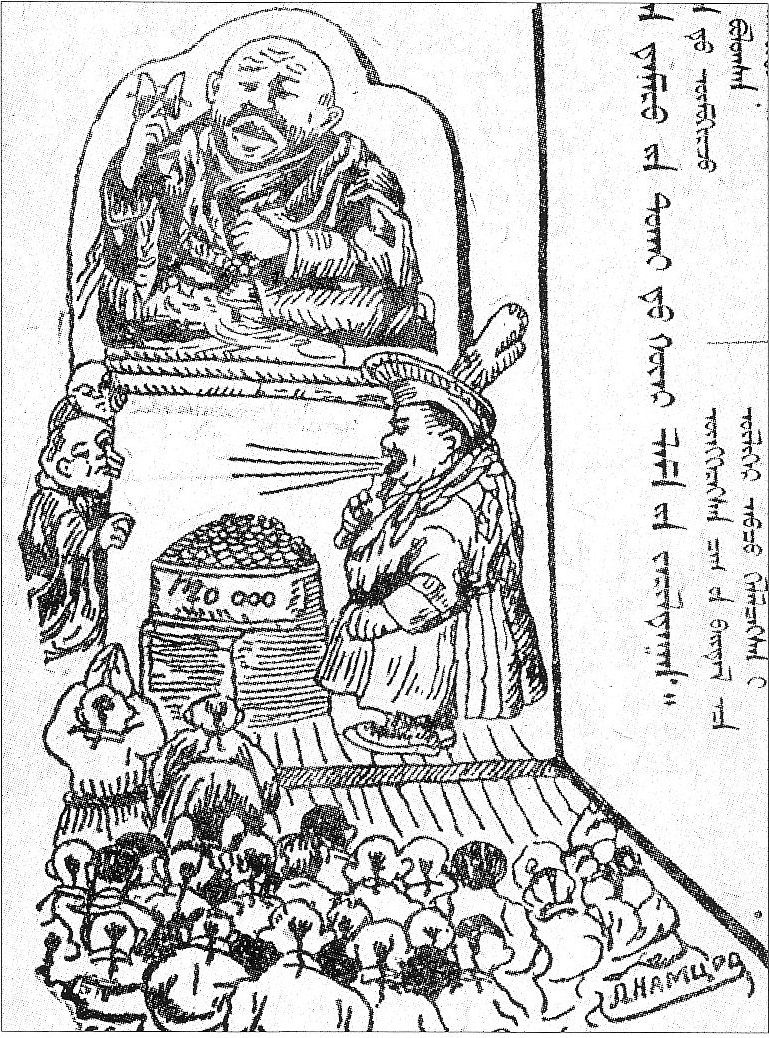
- Anti-Buddhist caricature. Magazine «Erdem ba Shajan» («Science and Religion», 1928)
- Editor: Bato-Dalai Togmitov
- Categories: antireligious
- Frequency: several times a year
- Founded: 1928
- Final issue: 1934
- Country: Soviet Union
- Based in: Verkhneudinsk
- Language: Buryat

Erdem ba Shazhan (Buryat: «Эрдэм ба шажан»; Russian: Наука и религия; translation of the name: "Science and Religion") was an anti-religious magazine in the Buryat-Mongolian language in the Mongolian script. The magazine was published by decision of the regional committee of the RCP(b) of May 8, 1928. It was the central publication of the Republican League of Atheists of the Buryat-Mongol Autonomous Soviet Socialist Republic. The magazine was published in Verkhneudinsk. In 1928, 3 issues of the magazine were published, in 1929 − 6 issues, in 1930 and 1931 − 9 numbers, in 1932 − 5 numbers, in 1934 − 2 numbers. The organizer and first editor of the magazine was Bato-Dalai Togmitov (Buryat: Бато-Далай Тогмитов; 1905 or 1906 -1938), who at that time worked as a researcher in the scientific committee of the republic. The magazine published materials explaining the policies of the cultural revolution, the fight against religion and the promotion of atheism among the Buryat population. The magazine published works of Buryat literature. In 1928, Abiduyev’s poem “Airplane” was published in the magazine.

== Notes ==
- А.Д. ЖАЛСАРАЕВ. РОССИЯ И БУДДИСТЫ БУРЯТИИ. 1917—2014. ЧАСТЬ 2 Взаимоотношения государственных органов России с буддистами Бурятии с 1917 г. по 2014 г. (часть 2)
- Периодическая печать СССР 1917-1949. Том 1. Библиографический указатель. Издательство: М:, Всесоюзной книжной палаты . Год: 1958. / Стр. 87
