= Tatar Union of the Godless =

Organisation in the Muslim republics

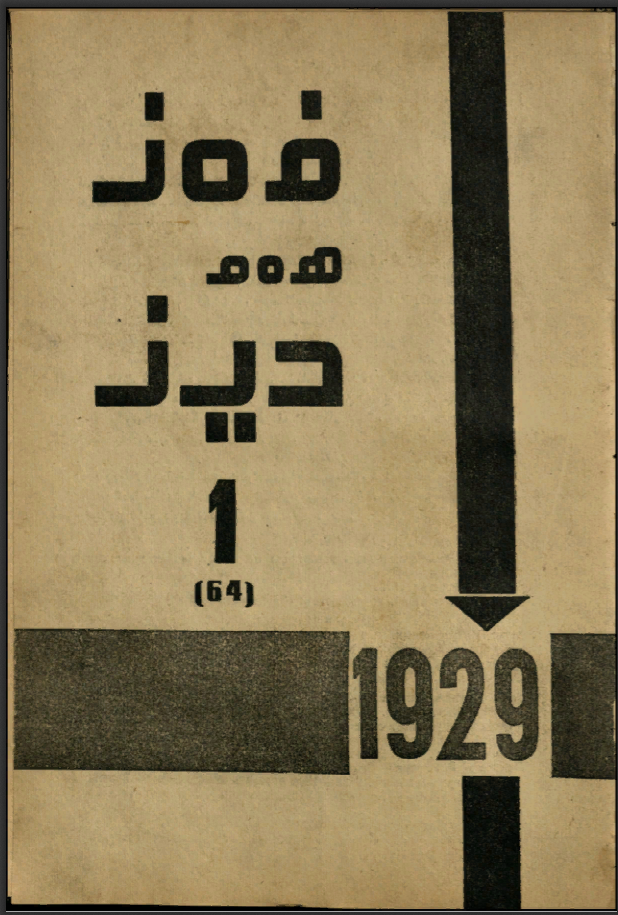
The cover of the anti-religious magazine in the Tatar language: فەن هەم دین - Fәn-Һәm-Din. 1929, No. 1

The Tatar Union of the Godless was an organisation in the Muslim republics during the purges by the Soviet Union. From 1928 to 1937, Burhan Mansurov served as the chairman of the organisation. The territory presently known as Tatarstan made demands for greater Tatar autonomy within the USSR, which came into conflict with the advocates of a federal system grouped around Joseph Stalin. In 1928, the leaders of the Tatar Union of the Godless were arrested, stripped of Bolshevik Party membership, and some were sentenced to death.

== See also ==
- League of Militant Atheists
