= League of Militant Atheists =

Soviet antireligious organization

- Сою́з Вои́нствующих Безбо́жников
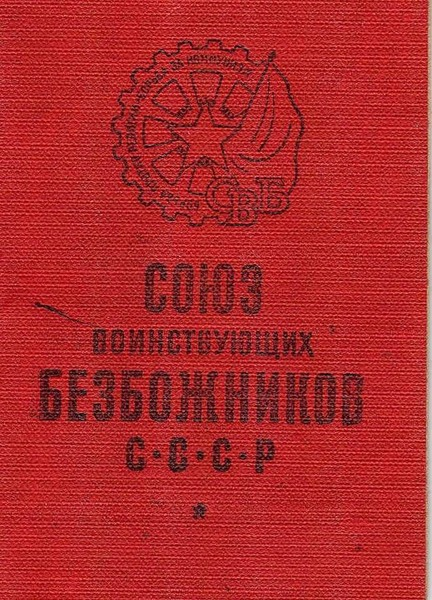
- Membership card of the league Членский билет Союза воинствующих безбожников
- Abbreviation: SVB
- Successor: All-Union Society for the Dissemination of Political and Scientific Knowledge
- Formation: 1925
- Dissolved: 1947
- Type: Volunteer organisation
- Location: Union of Soviet Socialist Republics
- Founder: Yemelyan Yaroslavsky
- Volunteers: 3,500,000
- Remarks: The fight against religion is the fight for socialism!

The League of Militant Atheists (Russian: Сою́з Вои́нствующих Безбо́жников, romanized: Soyúz Voínstvuyushchikh Bezbózhnikov, lit. 'The League of the Militant Godless', SVB), also Society of the Godless (Russian: О́бщество безбо́жников, romanized: Óbshchestvo Bezbózhnikov) or Union of the Godless (Russian: Сою́з Безбо́жников, romanized: Soyúz Bezbózhnikov), was an atheistic and antireligious organization of workers and intelligentsia that developed in Soviet Russia under the influence of the ideological and cultural views and policies of the Communist Party of the Soviet Union from 1925 to 1947. It consisted of party members, members of the Komsomol youth movement, those without specific political affiliation, workers, and military veterans.

The league embraced workers, peasants, students, and intelligentsia. It had its first affiliates at factories, plants, collective farms (kolkhozy), and educational institutions. By the beginning of 1941 it had about 3.5 million members from 100 ethnicities. It had about 96,000 offices across the country. Guided by Bolshevik principles of communist propaganda and by the Party's orders with regard to religion, the League aimed at exterminating religion in all its manifestations and forming an anti-religious scientific mindset among the workers. It propagated atheism, conducted so-called "individual work" (a method of sending atheist tutors to meet with individual believers to attempt to make them renounce their faith); most of the peasantry was unimpressed, and even the party apparatus regarded the League as meddling and inefficient. The League's slogan was "Struggle against religion is struggle for socialism", which was meant to tie in their atheist views with the Communist drive to 'build Socialism'. One of the slogans adopted at the 2nd congress proclaimed: "Struggle against religion is struggle for the five-year plan!" The League had international connections; it was part of the International of Proletarian Freethinkers and later of the Worldwide Freethinkers Union. By the mid-1930s, the Communist regime considered socialism to have been 'built', and the League adopted a new slogan: "Struggle against religion is struggle for communism", communism being the next stage after socialism according to Marxist ideology.

The league was a "nominally independent organization established by the Communist Party to promote atheism". It published newspapers, journals, and other materials that lampooned religion; it sponsored lectures and films; it organized demonstrations and parades; it set up antireligious museums; and it led a concerted effort telling Soviet citizens that religious beliefs and practices were wrong and harmful, and that good citizens ought to embrace an atheistic worldview.

== Origins and formation ==
The newspaper Bezbozhnik (Godless, Atheist) (1922–1941), founded and edited by Yemelyan Yaroslavsky, played a significant role in the League's establishment, and had a wide network of correspondents and readers. Bezbozhnik appeared first in December 1922, and the following year a Moscow monthly for industrial workers Bezbozhnik u Stanka (The Godless at the Work-Bench, also known as "Bezbust") formed the like-minded Moscow Society of the Godless in August 1924.

In November 1924, the Anti-Religious Commission of the All-Union Communist Party (b), and in December, the Organizing Bureau of the Central Committee supported the project of creating an all-Union godless society. A special commission was set up to prepare for the congress of atheists.

The first congress of the organization, which took place in April 1925, decided to create a single all-union anti-religious society, called the "Union of Atheists". Well known members of the Communist Party and Old Bolsheviks such as Nadezhda Krupskaya, Anatoly Lunacharsky, Pyotr Krasikov, Ivan Skvortsov-Stepanov, Vladimir Bonch-Bruyevich, Nikolai Bukharin and others participated in the foundation of the organization and Yemelyan Yaroslavsky was elected chairman.

In addition to the newspaper Bezbozhnik, the Central Soviet of the League of Militant Atheists published the illustrated magazine Bezbozhnik and the monthly magazine Antireligioznik. The publishing society "Ateist" arose in 1921 in Moscow. It published the magazine Ateist from 1923 to 1931. This magazine published mainly works translated from foreign languages. Since 1931, the magazine Voinstvuiuschii ateizm, a periodical of the Central Soviet of the League of Militant Atheists, began to be published. Along with periodicals in Russian, the League of Militant Atheists published periodicals in other languages:

- "Bezvirnik" (Ukrainian: "Безвірник") − in Ukrainian,
- "Xudasizlar" (Uzbek: "Xudasizlar"; Uzbek: "Худасызляр" − transcription: "Khudasyzlyar") − in Uzbek
- "Fen-em-Din" (Tatar: "فەن هەم دین" "Фән һәм дин") − in Tatar (Tatar: Сугышчан алласыз, lit. 'Warrior God')
- "Der Apikoires" (Yiddish: "דער אפיקוירעס") - in Yiddish
- "Anastvats" (Armenian: "Անաստված") – in Armenian
- "Das Neuland" − in German
- "Erdem ba Shazhan" (Buryat: "Эрдэм ба шажан") – in Buryat
- "Mebrdzoli Ateisti" (Georgian: "მებრძოლი ათეისტი") – in Georgian
- "Bezbożnik wojujący" – in Polish
- "Allahsyz" (Azerbaijani: "Аллаhсыз") – in Azerbaijani
- "Allakhyz" (Bashkir: "Аллаһыҙ") – in Bashkir

By 1932, 10 anti-religious newspapers and 23 anti-religious magazines were published in the USSR.

The Moscow group tended to support the leftist side of the debate on how to destroy religion (i.e. in favour of attacking religion in all of its forms rather than moderation), and in 1924 it attacked Yaroslavsky, Anatoly Lunacharsky and Vladimir Bonch-Bruyevich for differentiation between different religions, instead of genuine godlessness. It accused Yaroslavsky of attacking only the clergy rather than religion in general. Yaroslavsky protested this and affirmed that all religions were enemies of socialism including the Renovationist schism in the Orthodox church, but that the methods of struggle against different religions should vary due to the large number of loyal Soviet citizens with religious beliefs who should be re-educated as atheists rather than treated as class enemies. Bezbozhnik argued that it was an oversimplification to treat religion solely as a kind of class exploitation to be attacked, forgetting the complex nature of religions, as well as the individual believers. The CPSU Central Committee supported Yaroslavsky's viewpoint on this issue, although this debate remained unresolved at the Union that came in 1925.

The Moscow group merged with the Society of Friends of the Godless Newspaper (associated with Bezbozhnik) in April 1925 to form the All-Union League of the Godless at its first congress. Between 1925 and 1929 a power struggle took place in the new organization between Yaroslavsky and his followers, and the leadership of the former Moscow group (Galaktionov, Polidorov, Kostelovskaia, Lunin and others). The 1926 All-Union Conference on Antireligious Propaganda voted in favour of Yaroslavsky's views on the antireligious campaign, but the debate still continued. The Moscow group argued that the antireligious struggle should be led only by the party and the industrial proletariat, as opposed to the whole nation which Yaroslavsky wanted to mobilize to conduct the antireligious campaign.

In 1929, when resolutions that would set the tone for intensive persecution of the next decade were set and Yaroslavsky's victory in the power struggle had been completed, there were a few last attacks made on Yaroslavsky and the organization for minimizing the class-enemy thesis in attacking religion, of having few workers and peasants in its ranks, of using archaeology instead of aggressively attacking religion, of being indifferent to transforming the school system into a fundamentally antireligious atmosphere and of opportunistically citing works by non-Marxist Western bourgeois atheists in publications. In response, Yaroslavsky claimed that they had supported antireligious education for years, but in contrast to the leftists who simply wanted to attack religion, he was working to replace the popular religious ideology with that of dialectical materialism. He also pointed out correctly that Lenin had used the works of the 18th century French atheists and other bourgeois atheists to assist in the campaign to disseminate atheism in the USSR. He admitted that the effect of their efforts up to that point was less than he had hoped, which he implicitly blamed on the Moscow branch for their lack of cooperation, lack of support from the party and some branches of the Komsomol, and a ban operating on their activities in Ukraine, as well as an inadequate finances.

Yaroslavsky, Stalin's loyal aide in the secretariat and one of the founding editors of Kommunist, came out on top despite the Moscow group's resistance in an effort to retain autonomy and the support for that group from the daily Komsomol'skaia Pravda.

The problems that Yaroslavsky outlined in his response were addressed in 1929 at the second congress. The CPSU Central Committee delegated to the LMA full powers to launch a great antireligious attack with the objective of completely eliminating religion from the country, granting them the right to mobilize all public organizations.

In 1929, the Second Congress changed the society's name to The Union of Belligerent (or Militant) Atheists. At this Second Congress of Atheists, Nikolai Bukharin, the editor of Pravda, called for the extermination of religion "at the tip of the bayonet." The Central Council chose Yaroslavsky as its leader; he occupied this post continuously.

=== Atheistic periodicals published in various languages ===
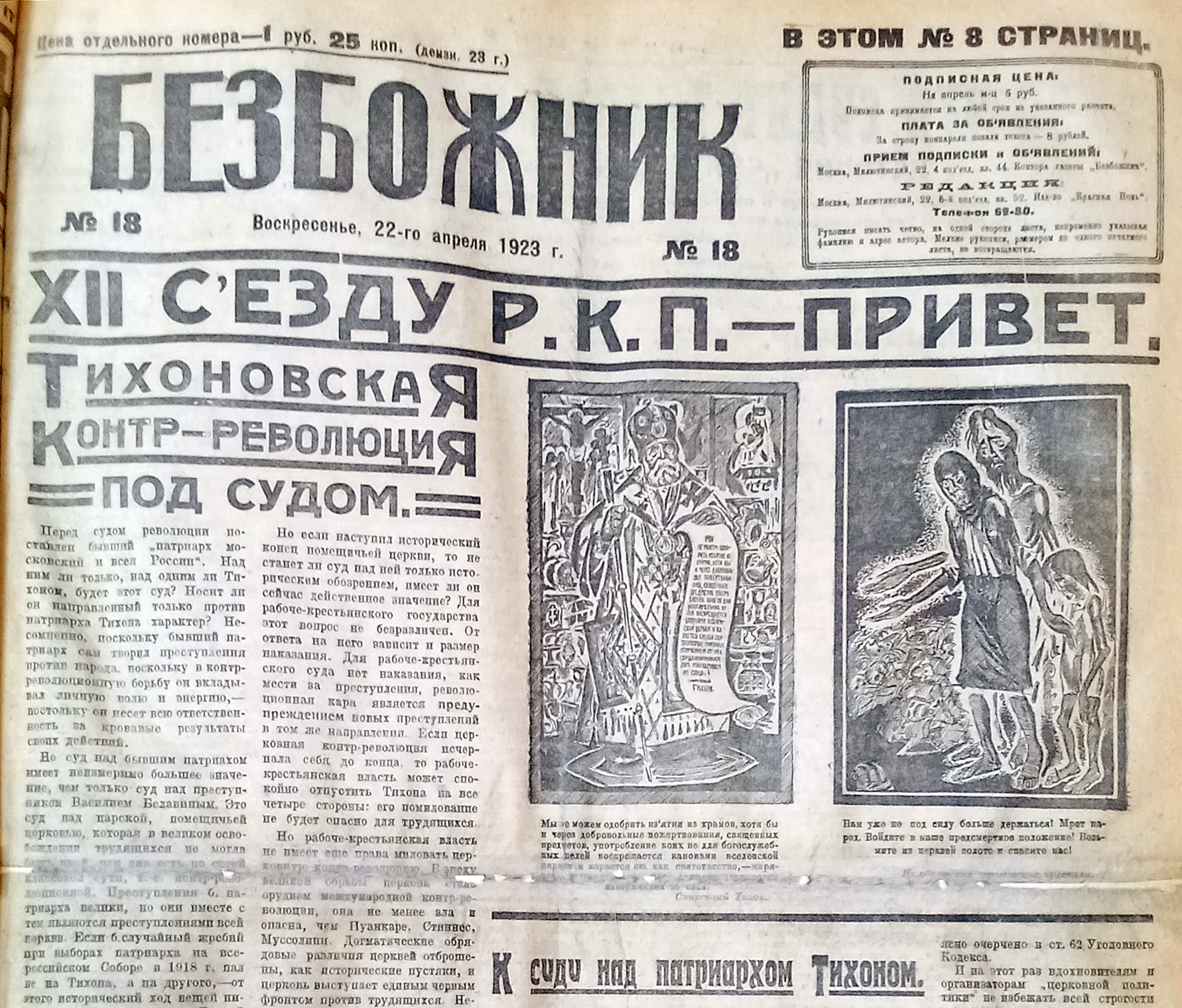
language − Russian. Moscow. Bezbozhnik

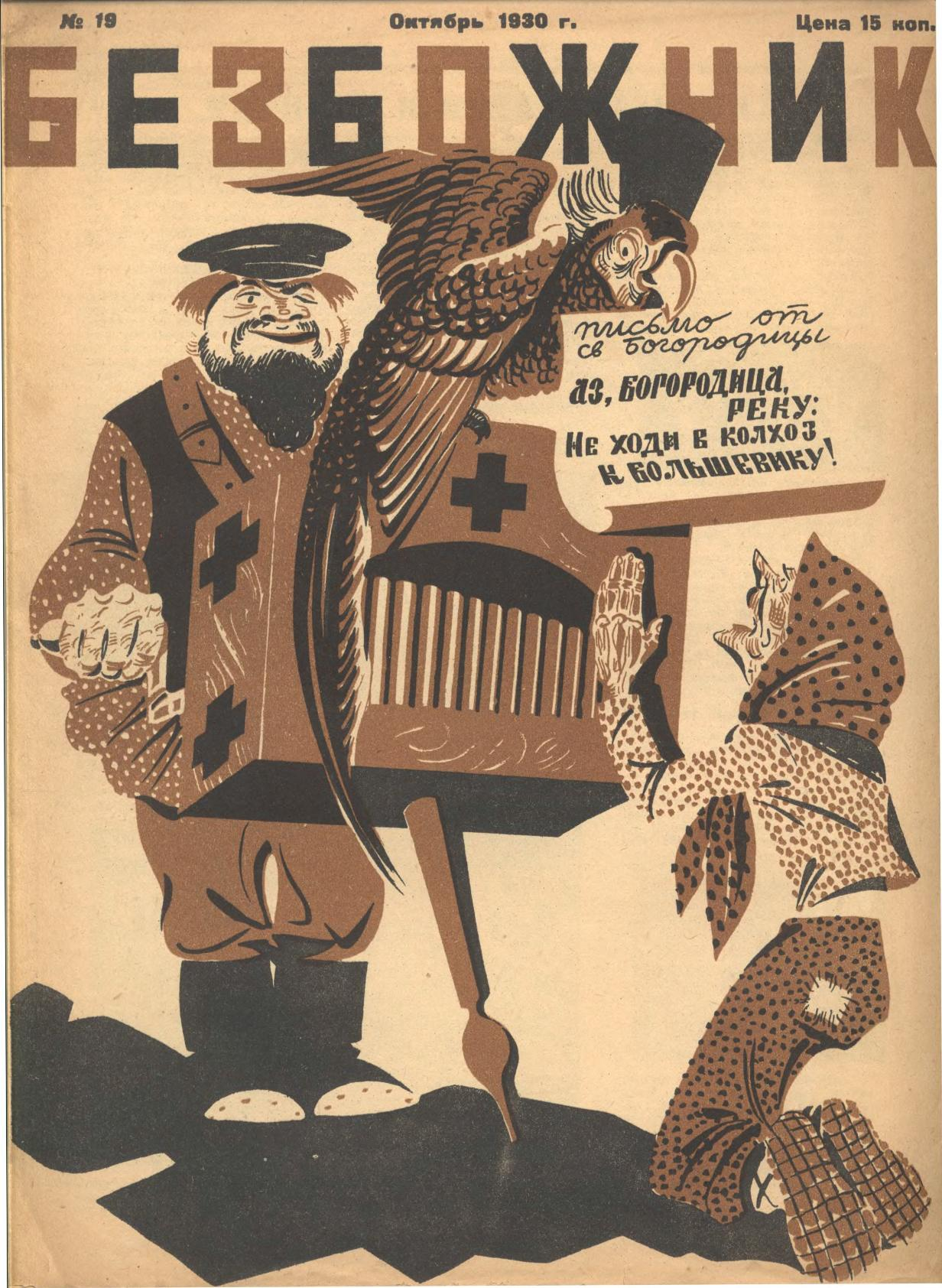
language − Russian. Moscow. Bezbozhnik

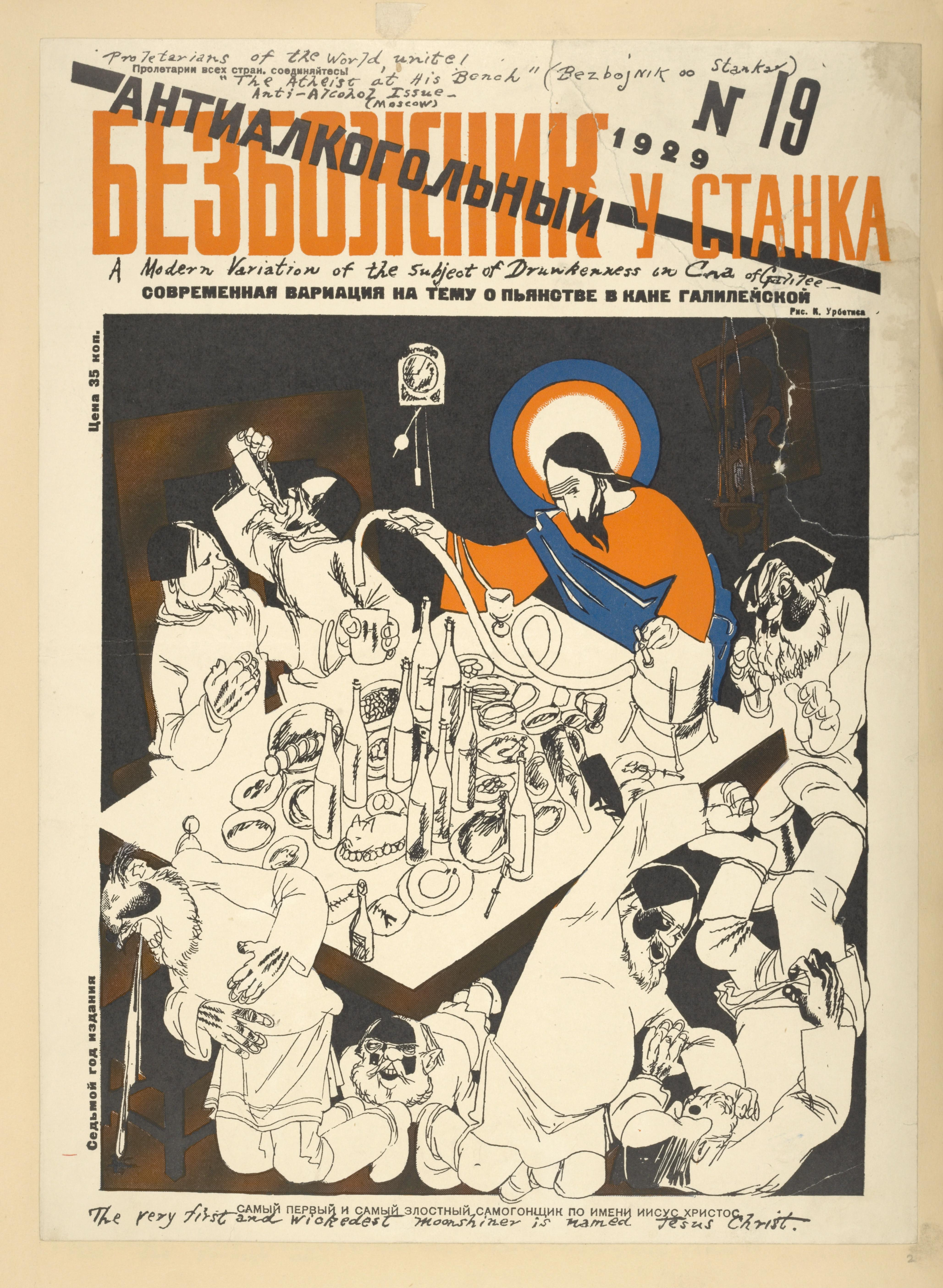
language − Russian. Moscow. Bezbozhnik u Stanka

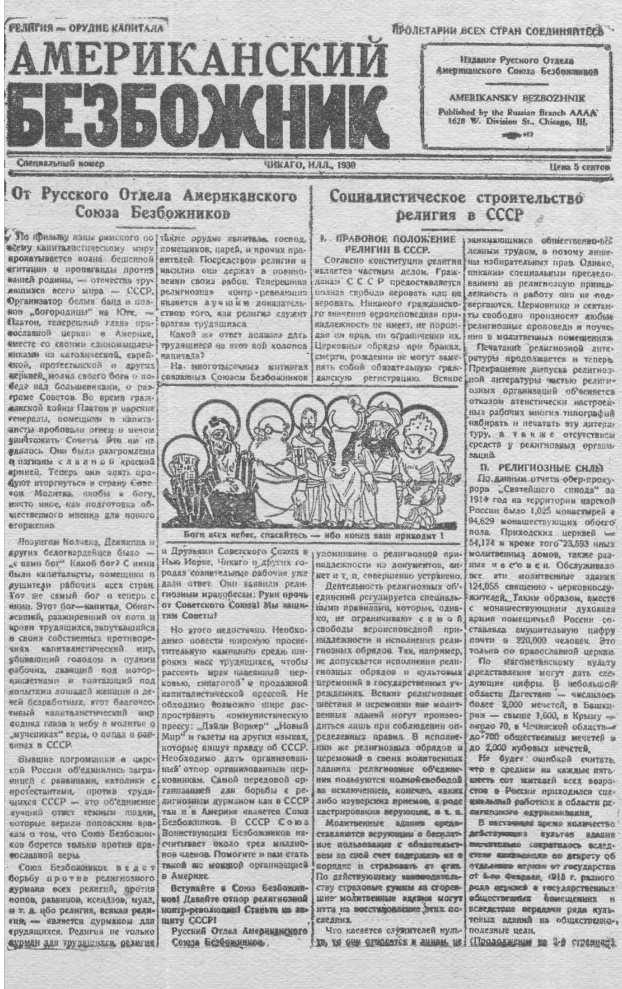
language − Russian. Chicago. Amerikansky Bezbozhnik (newspaper)

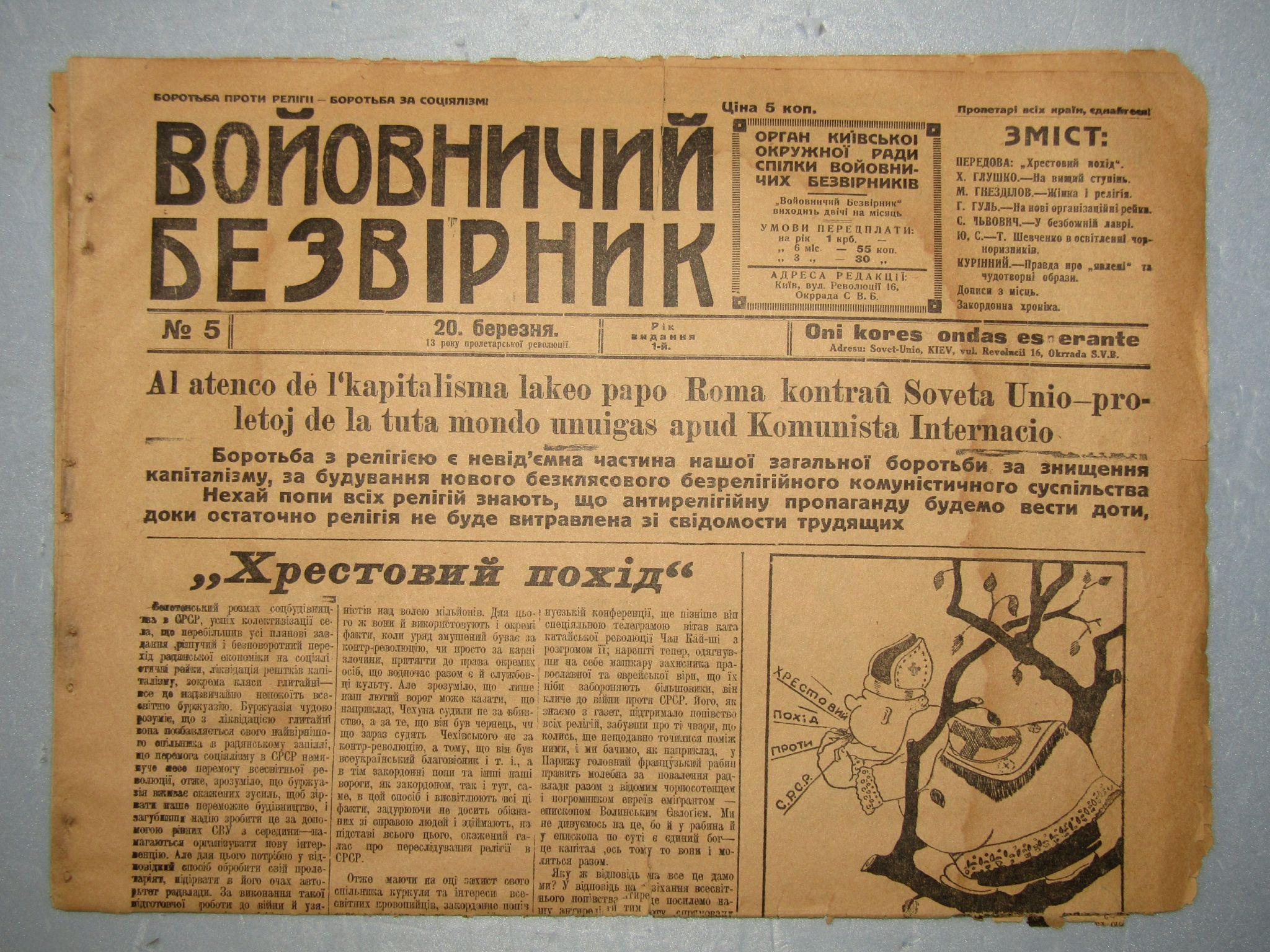
language − Ukrainian. Kiev. Voyovnichny Bezvirnik

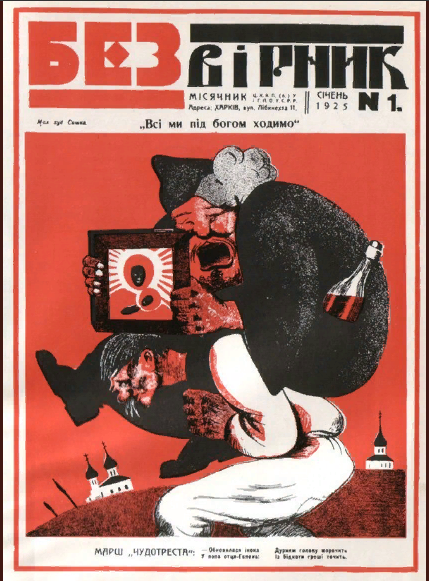
language − Ukrainian. Kharkiv. Bezvirnik

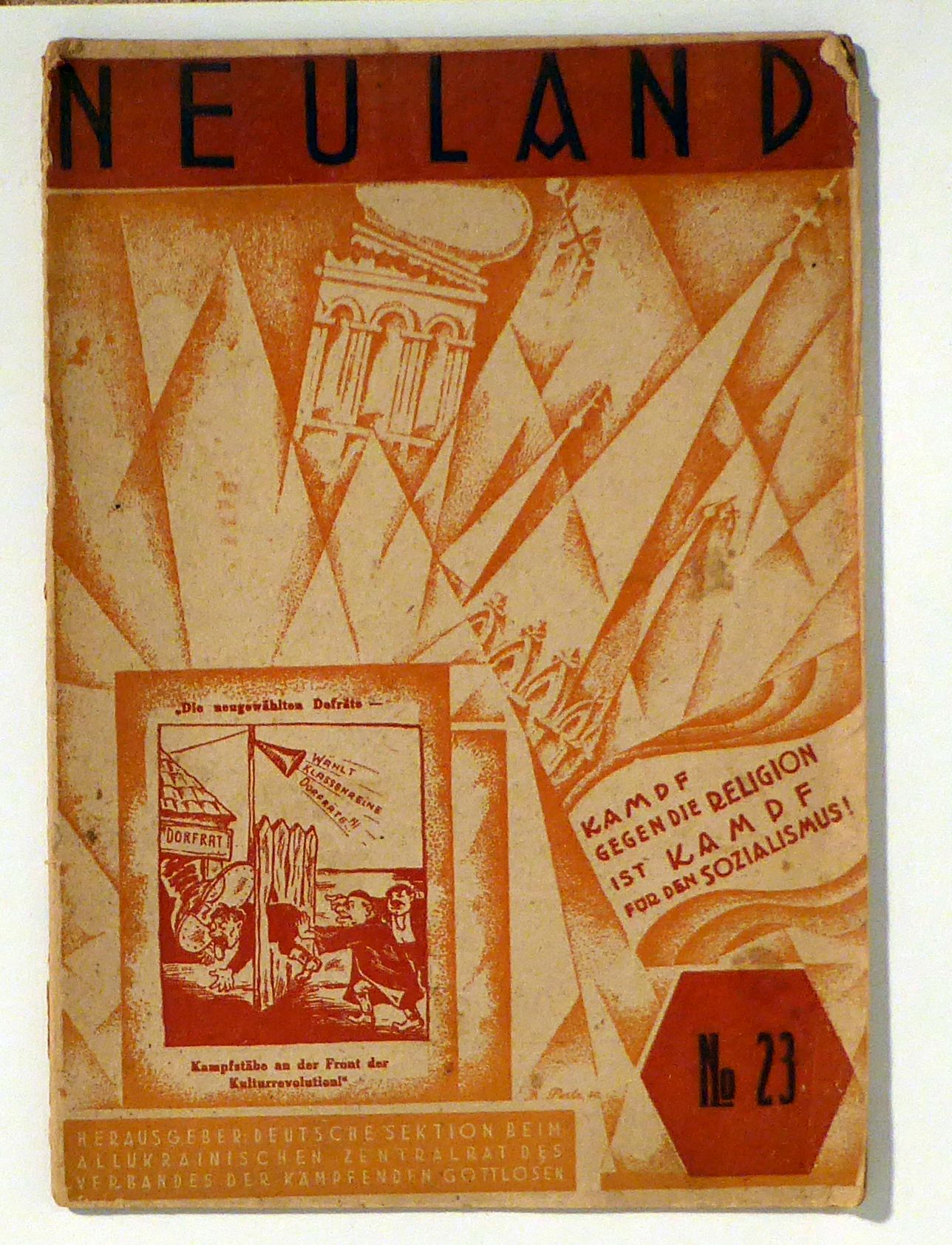
language − German. Kharkiv. Das Neuland

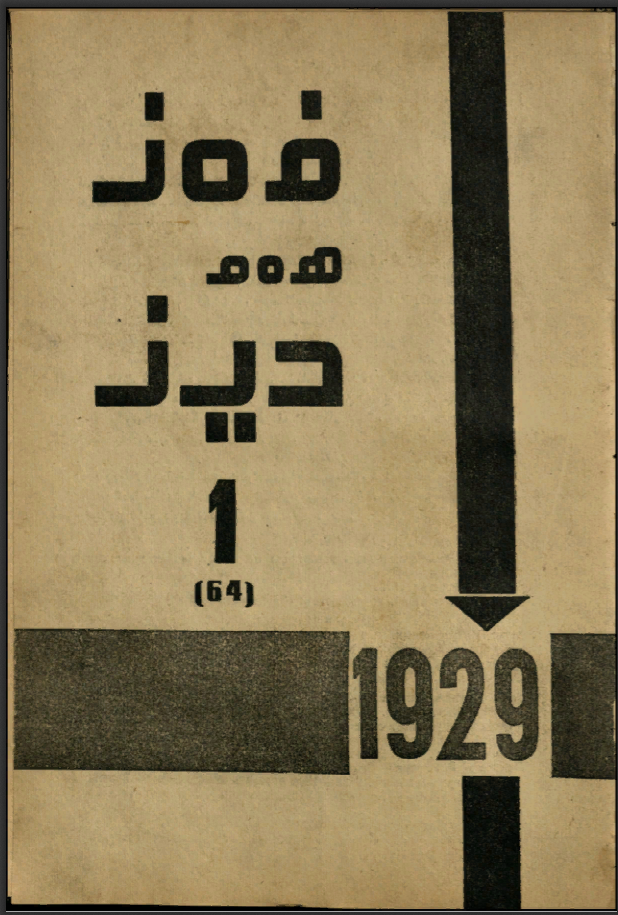
language − Tatar. Moscow. Fen-em-Din

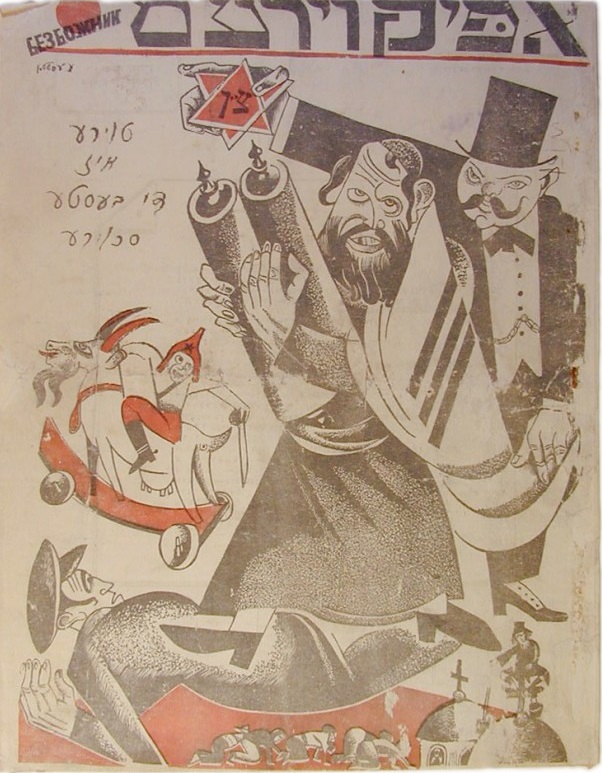
language − Yiddish. Moscow. Der Apikoires (דער אפיקוירעס)

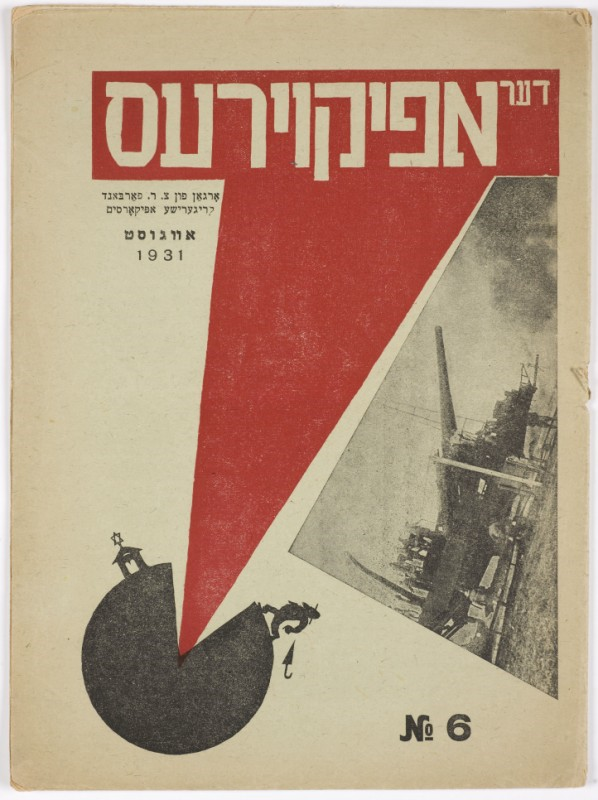
El Lissitzky's cover of Der Apikojres

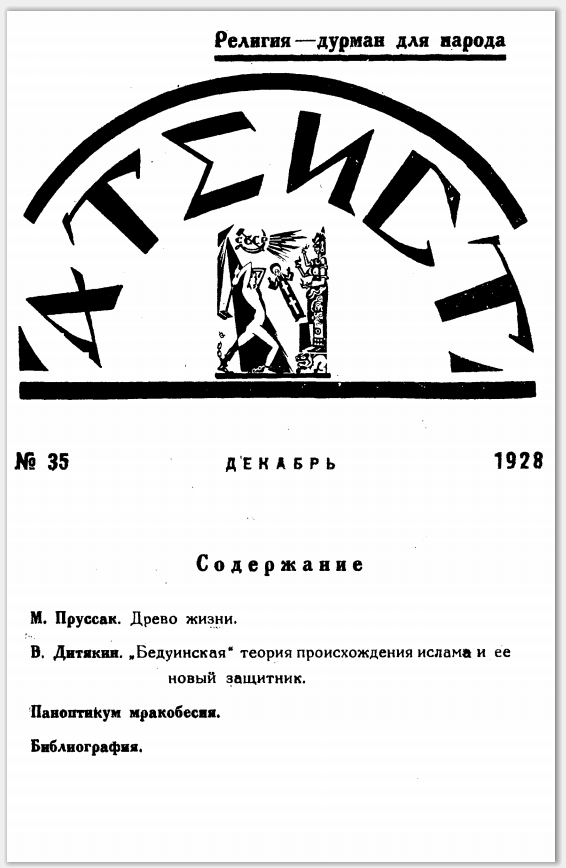
language − Russian. Moscow. Ateist

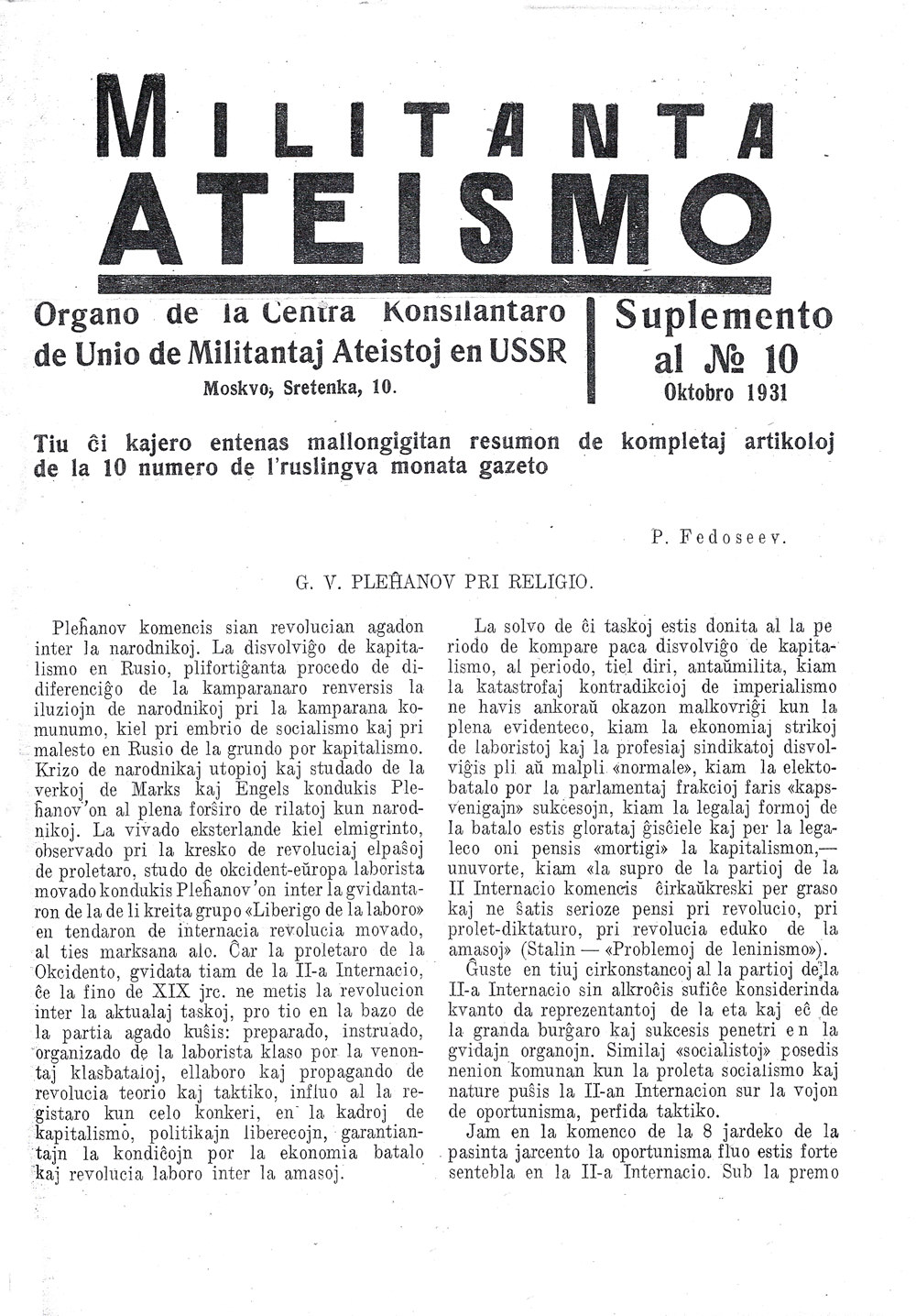
language − Russian, German, Esperanto. Moscow. Voinstvuiuschii ateizm

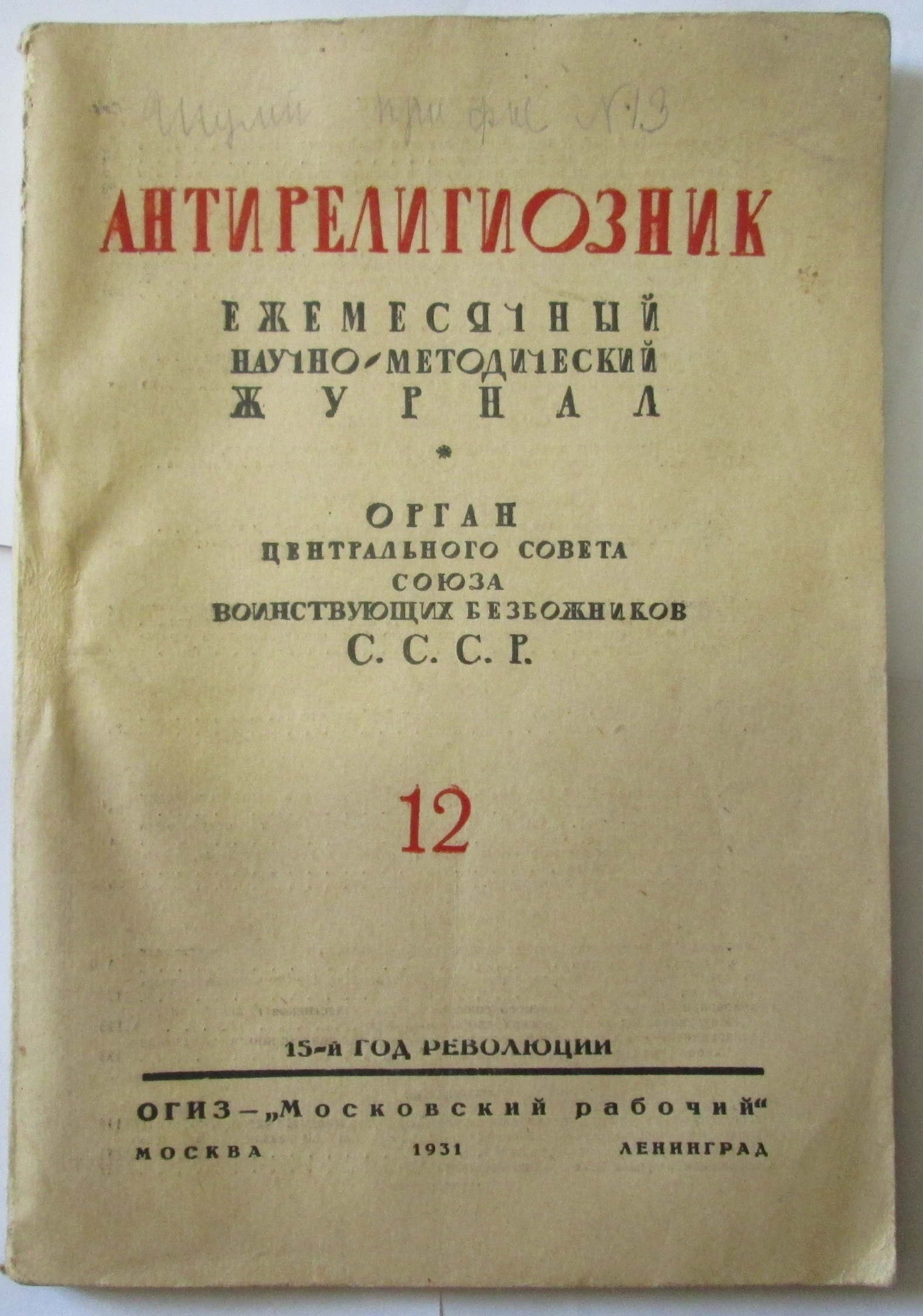
language − Russian. Moscow. Antireligioznik

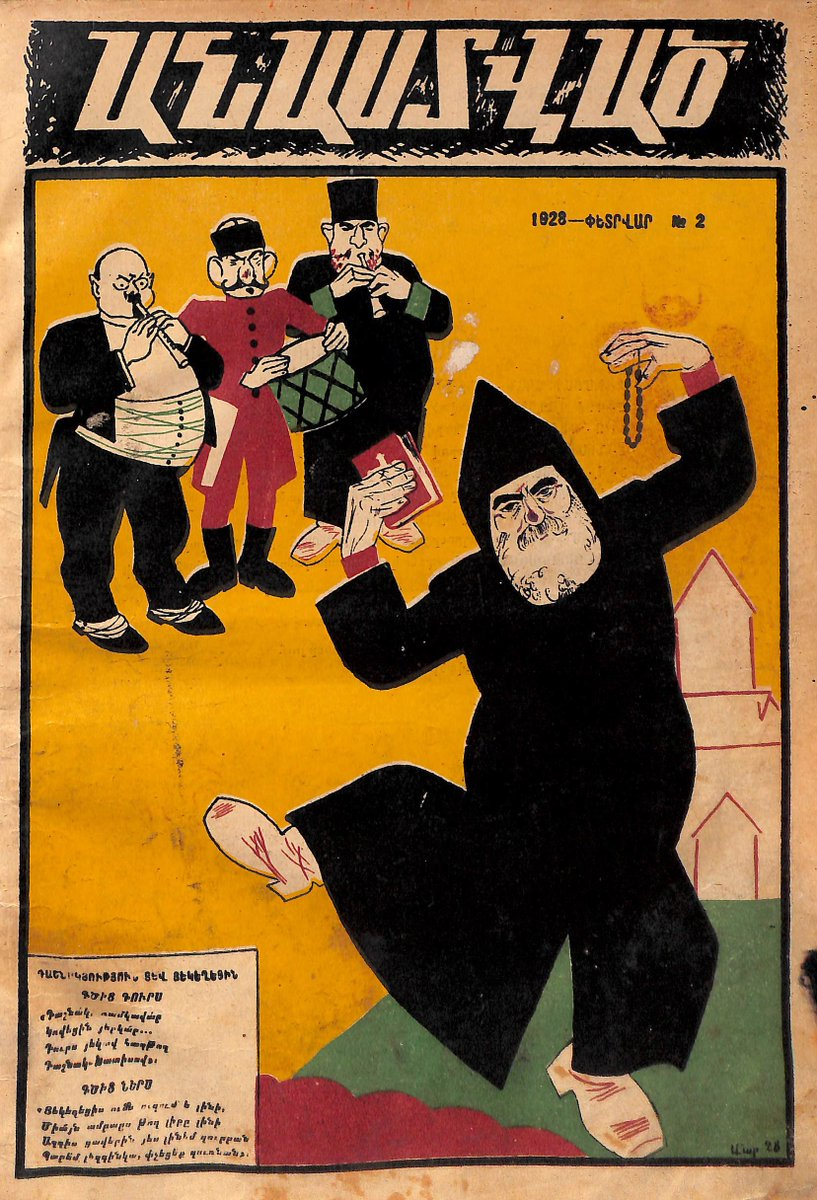
language − Armenian. Yerevan. Anastvats

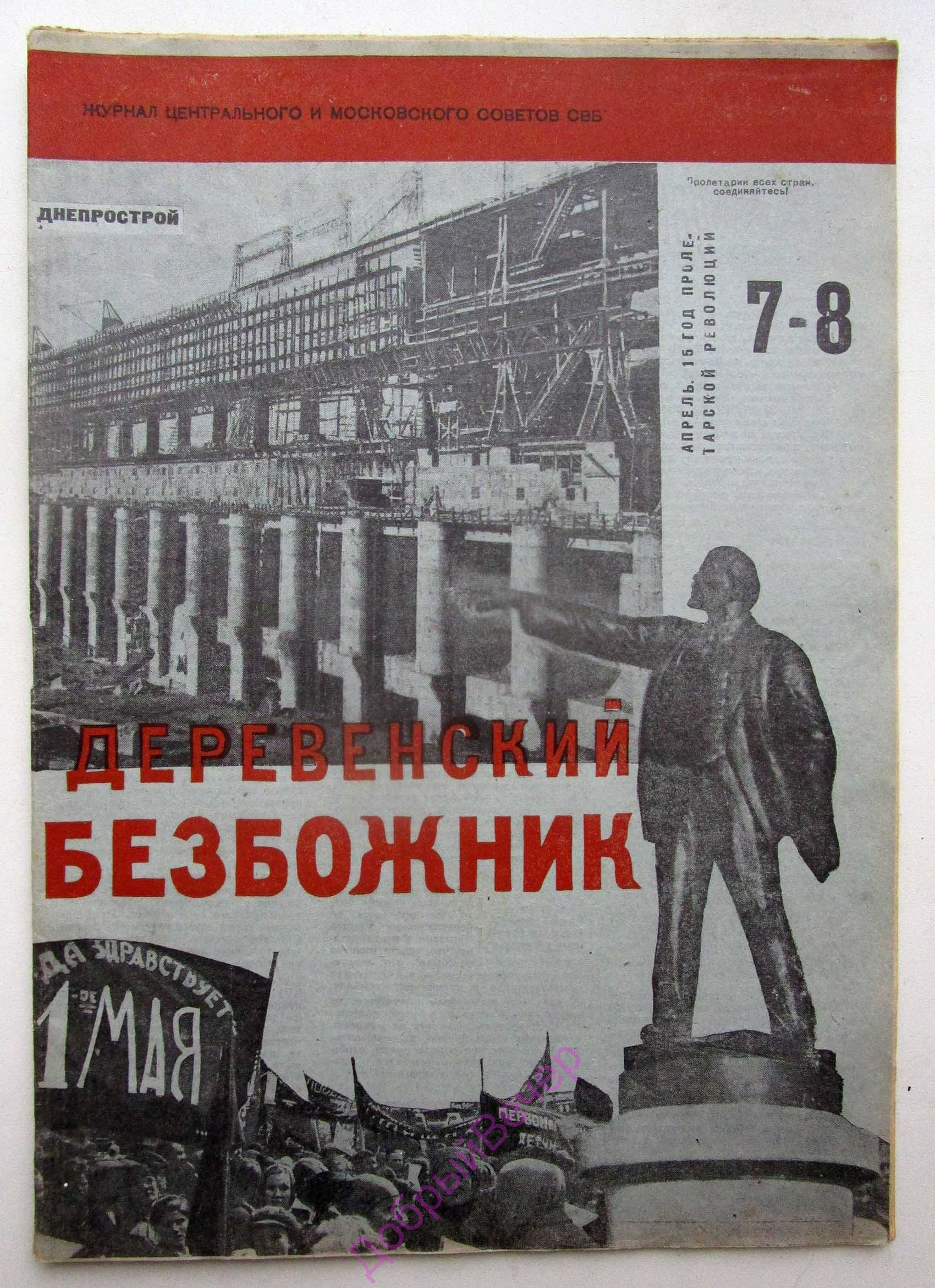
language − Russian. Moscow. Derevenskiy Bezbozhnik

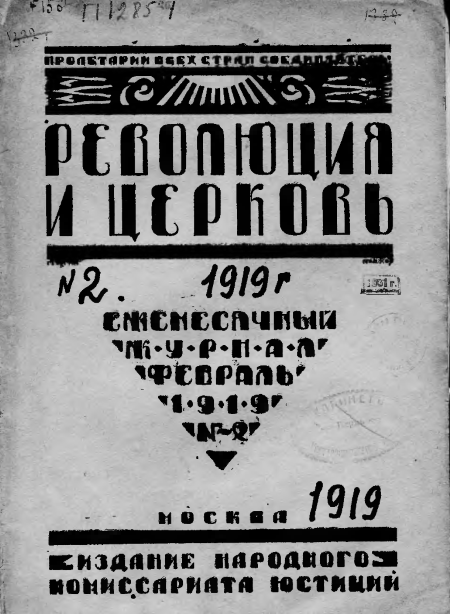
language − Russian. Moscow. Revolution and the Church

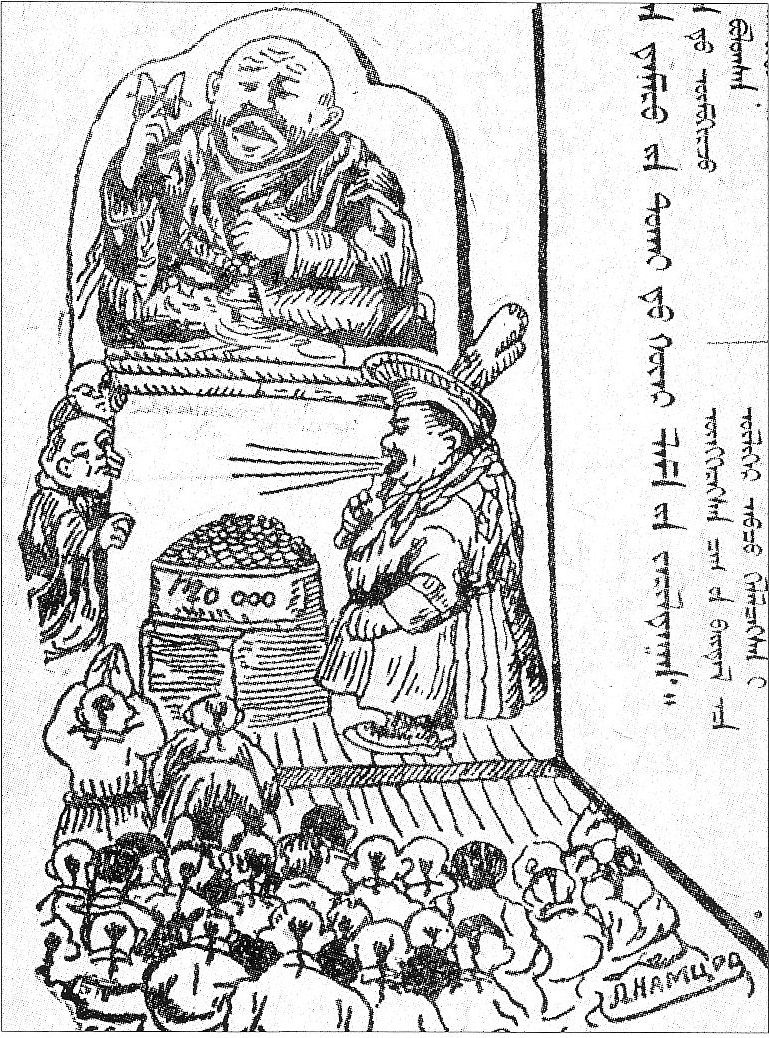
language − Buryat. Ulan-Ude / Verkhneudinsk. Erdem ba Shazhan

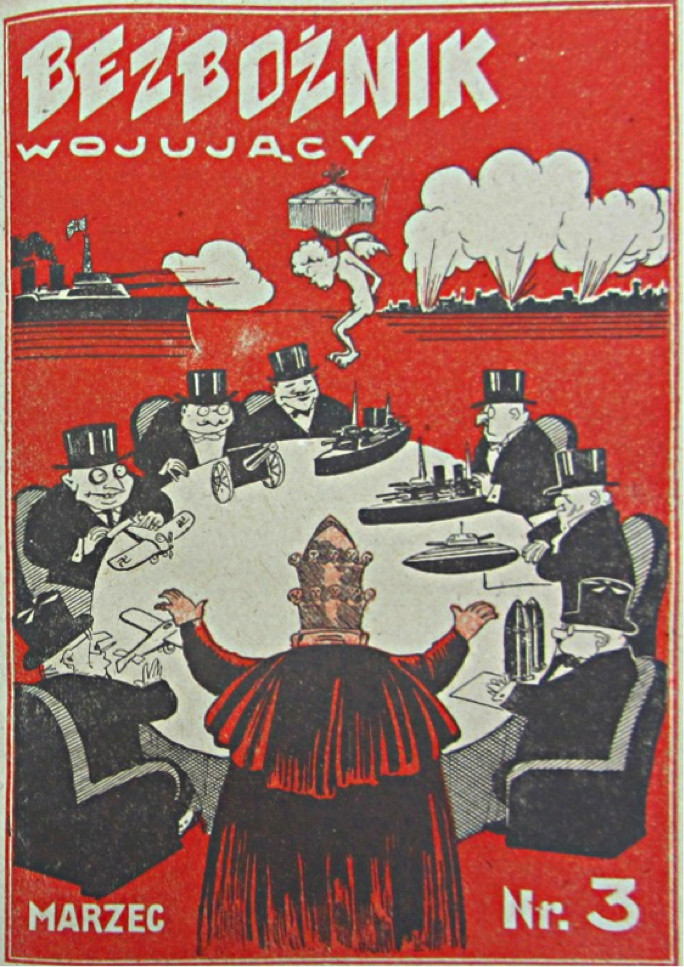
language − Polish. Moscow. Bezbożnik Wojujący

language − Georgian. Tbilisi. Mebrdzoli Ughmerto

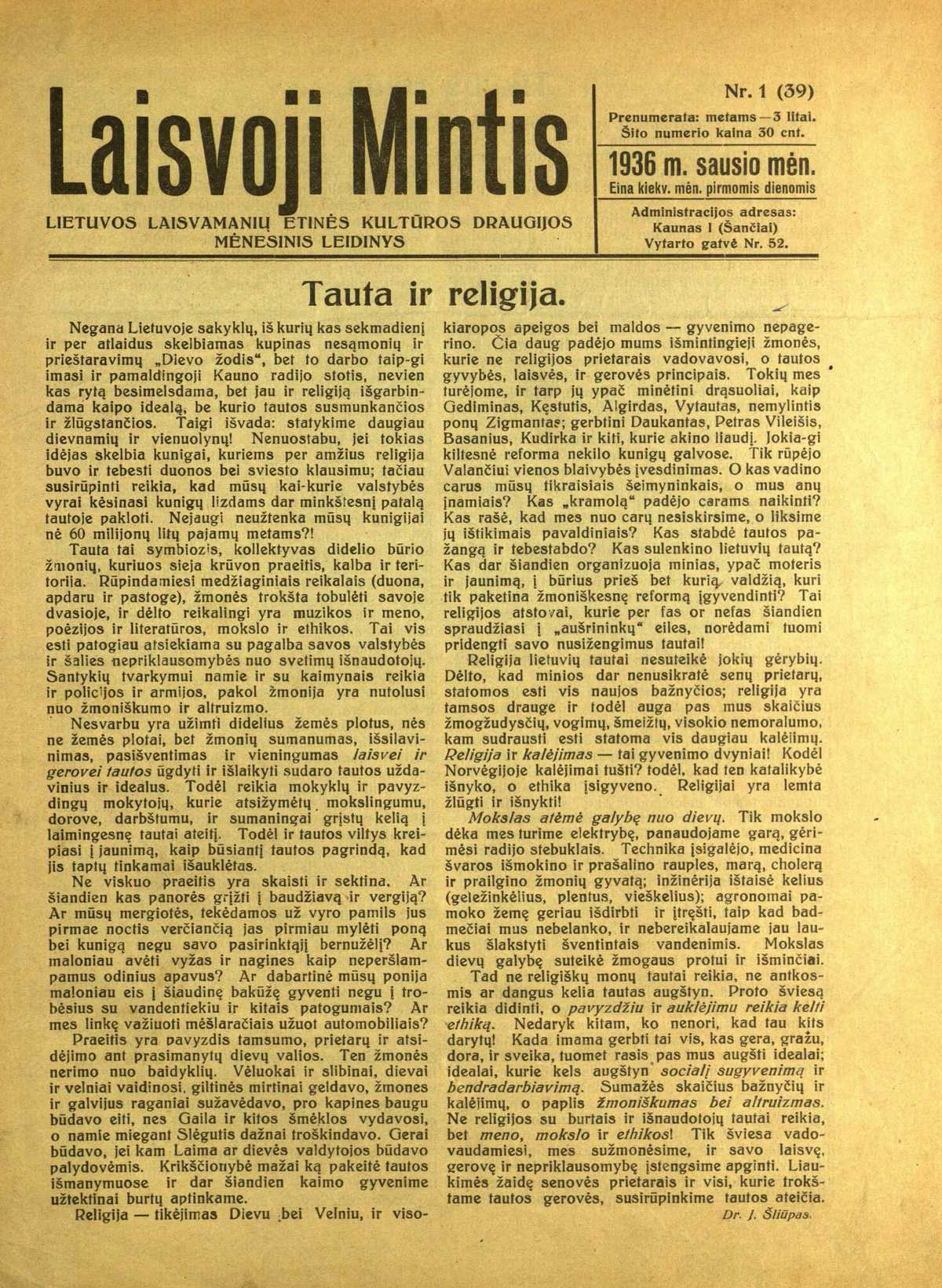
language − Lithuanian. Kaunas. Laisvoji mintis

== Authority on antireligious methodology ==
The debate on how to best exterminate religion was argued among the Soviet leadership, until in the late 1920s and early 1930s, when it was resolved by Stalin who condemned the extremes of both sides, and Yaroslavsky followed suit. The do-nothing approach of the rightists who thought religion would die away naturally and the leftist approach to attack all forms of religion as class enemies were both condemned as deviations from the party line. Yaroslavsky argued against the leftists (who had earlier criticized him) that if religion was simply a class phenomenon there would be no need to combat it if a classless society was truly being produced. He affirmed that an all-sided attack on religion was needed, but did not subscribe to the leftist deviation that had been condemned.

The League not only attacked religion but also attacked deviations from what it saw as the proper line to combat religion in the USSR and, in effect, set the 'proper' line to follow in this sphere for party membership. Early Marxist beliefs that religion would disappear with the coming of a tractor were ridiculed by the League. The popularity of religion among nationalistic intellectuals was pointed out by Lukachevsky (LMG) and he claimed that if religion was only rooted in ownership of property, it could not explain the growth of the renovationists.

The League occupied the leadership role in the antireligious campaign of the Communist Party.

It employed the powers given to it by the CPSU Central Committee at the 1929 congress to dictate orders to schools, universities, the Soviet Armed Forces, the trade unions, the Komsomol, the Vladimir Lenin All-Union Pioneer Organization, the Soviet press, and other institutions for the purpose of its antireligious campaign. It criticized many public institutions (including the Communist Party) for failing to adequately attack religious belief and instructed them on how to be more effective. The People's Commisariat of Education was heckled and Glavnauka, the Chief Administration for Science and Scholarship was also singled out for criticism. A spokesperson for the latter tried to justify their behaviour to the LMA by claiming that they had reduced the total number of historical buildings under its protection (mostly ancient churches and monasteries) from 7000 to 1000, by destroying them.

The League concerned itself with the issue of active believers who had infiltrated its own membership and who were trying to prove their loyalty to the regime or even undermine the antireligious work of the League. League members who suspected each other of harbouring religious beliefs secretly discussed their concerns in the early years. The League also had to address the issue of atheists in its membership who may have sympathized with the religious believers and who may have had doubts about what they were doing. In answer to these, the League adopted a policy that any League member who entered a church (to conduct antireligious work by checking on the strength of believers or numbering them) had to first receive local branch approval beforehand in order so that he did not give the impression that he was going to the church to pray. In contrast the League in Tashkent actually tried to translate the Quran into Uzbek so that more Muslims could read it, in hope that when Muslims were able to read what the Quran actually said, they would reject its content as fallacious.

All members of the Komsomol were obligated to join the League, and it directed all members of the CPSU to support the League's work. The extreme character of the line to be taken against religion is described:

All religions, no matter how much they 'renovate' and cleanse themselves, are systems of idea... profoundly hostile to the ideology of... socialism... Religious organizations... are in reality political agencies... of class groupings hostile to the proletariat inside the country and of the international bourgeoisie... Special attention must be paid to the renovationist currents in Orthodoxy, Islam, Lamaism and other religions... These currents are but the disguises for more effective struggle against the Soviet power. By comparing ancient Buddhism, and ancient Christianity to communism, the Renovationists are essentially trying to replace the communist theory by a cleansed form of religion, which therefore becomes more dangerous.

In 1932 the Second Plenum of the LMA Central Council was ordered by Stalin to adopt an antireligious five-year plan with the intention of eliminating the Church and its influence in the USSR.

Under the doctrine of state atheism in the Soviet Union, there was a "government-sponsored program of forced conversion to atheism" conducted by the Communists, with the LMA at the forefront of this campaign. Many priests were killed and imprisoned. Thousands of churches were closed, some turned into hospitals.

== 1929 Congress ==
In addition to what is stated above, the 1929 LMA Congress also issued a number of other orders that would form the basis of the LMA's activities (as well as the character of the antireligious persecution throughout the country) in the following decade.

At its 1929 Congress, it admitted that there had been some growth in sectarian groups, but claimed that this was local rather than national phenomena. They said, however, that lay religious activists exceeded one million and that all of the religious communities including the old Orthodox had begun to adopt modern methods and were attracting youth. It determined therefore that the fight against religion needed to be pressed, although it still, as Yaroslavsky had said for years, warned against extreme antireligious ultra-left attacks. At the same meeting it demanded that no holidays should be allowed to coincide with important Church feast days; this policy was carried out in the same year.

The resolutions at the meeting called for local LMA branches to effect total public ostracism of the clergy. They ordered that priests should not be invited to private homes, donations to churches should be halted once and for all, and that trade unions should be pressured not to perform any work for the churches in compliance with the policies in force. The party would adopt this resolution a year later.

The congress also criticized the armed forces for failing to conduct adequate antireligious education among servicemen in the forces. The organization had set up cells in the armed forces in each unit beginning in 1927. In a study done on a unit in 1925, it was found that 60% of recruits were religious believers at the time of recruitment, while only 28% remained believers at the end of their service. This data may have ignored the phenomena of soldiers who hid their religious convictions during their service and thus have some inaccuracy. These experiences nevertheless played a role in the LMA's approach to combatting religion in the military in the following decade.

The 1929 Congress called on public institutions to treat antireligious propaganda as an inseparable part of their work and to provide regular funding for it.

The congress eliminated preferential treatment for different sects and declared unrelenting war against them, but contained the moderating statement to differentiate between the rank-and-file believers and the leadership, the latter of which were considered fully conscientious class enemies of the state.

The congress resolutions stated that religious temples should be shut only with the agreement of the majority of the working populace. There were, however, no qualifications for this majority to include religious believers associated with the given religious structure. This allowed the practice to be conducted in the following years wherein a meeting would be organized under pressure at which believers who attended would be risking their social status and would often find themselves in a minority, which would allow for a vote to close the structure. The LMA would take advantage of rifts between different believers, including that between the Orthodox and Renovationists, in order to get either side to vote for the closure of each other's religious structures.

The congress called on antireligious education to be instituted from the first-grade up in schools. Two years later, further calls would be made by leading antireligious propagandist N. Amosov to institute antireligious education among pre-school children.

This congress received much larger coverage in the Soviet press than the previous congress, although it was overshadowed by the German Communist congress that occurred at the same time.

== Activities ==
In 1931, the LMA boasted that 10% of the nation's schoolchildren who were Young Pioneers or Komsomol members also concurrently held LMA memberships.

The LMA underwent great growth between 1929 and 1932, partly as a result of the requirement of Komsomol members to join it. The LMA's hold over the Komsomol is reflected in the latter's programme at its 10th congress that state 'The Komsomol patiently explains to the youth the harmfulness of superstitions and of religious prejudices, organizing for this purpose special study circles and lectures on antireligious propaganda. The League had grown from 87,000 members in 1926 to 500,000 in 1929 and it reached a peak of 5,670,000 in 1931 (dropping to 5.5 million in 1932) (it had intended to get 17 million, however, as its target). It declined to 2 million in 1938, but rose again to 3.5 million in 1941. The Communist party at the time had 1.8 million members. Almost half of the LMA's membership, however, resided within the cities of Moscow and Leningrad and their metropolitan areas, which led to the LMA then creating 'cells' across the country in order to reach rural citizens for atheist propagation.

The LMA alleged massive growth in the Central Asian republics in the 1930s. The Central Asian Muslims, who had a long history of encountering Christian missionaries attempting to convert them away from Islam, were considered to pose a special issue for LMA activists who were told by Yaroslavsky that

A careless approach to the matter of antireligious propaganda among these people can call up memories of this [Tsarist] oppression and be interpreted by the most backward and the most fanatical part of the Muslim population as a repeat of the past, when Christian missionaries reviled the Mohammedan faith.

Under the LMA's guidance, 'Godless collective farms', were formed. Yaroslavsky in 1932 thought that the campaign would be successful, when he said:

There can be no doubt that the fact that the new state of the USSR led by the communist party, with a program permeated by the spirit of militant atheism, gives the reason why this state is successfully surmounting the great difficulties that stand in its way - that neither "heavenly powers" nor the exhortations of all the priests in all the world can prevent its attaining its aims it has set itself.

The enthusiasm of its new members was notably poor, however, as its dues were left unpaid and only a minority appeared to have great interest in antireligious work.

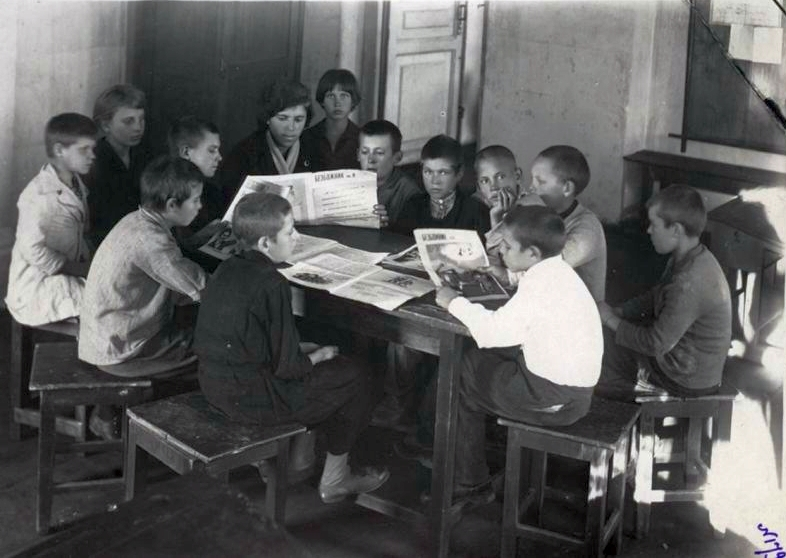
Club of young atheists, 1930s

The League printed masses of antireligious literature. These would mock religious belief. The weekly Bezbozhnik reached 500,000 copies per issue in 1931. The monthly Bezbozhnik, grew from 28,000 in 1928 to 200,000 in 1931, dropped to 150,000 after 1932, climbed to 230,000 in 1938 and went down 155,000 in 1939. The Bezbozhnik u Stanka consistently ran 50,000-70,000 copies per issue, however, it changed from a monthly to a fortnightly in 1929 and continued to produce until it was closed in 1932. Yaroslavsky's scholarly monthly for the LMA central committee 'Antireligioznik' (The Antireligious) appeared in 1926, and reached 17,000 circulation in 1929 (it was a 130-page publication), 30,000 in 1930 and 27,000 in 1931. Its material was often repeated over different issues and it was more primitive in its scholarly material than it had been intended. It was reduced to 64 pages in 1940, and produced between 40,000 and 45,000 in 1940-41 before it was finally cancelled.

The League also printed antireligious textbooks. An 'Antireligious Textbook for Peasants' was produced between 1927 and 1931, with a circulation of 18,000 for the first edition and 200,000 for the sixth. A similar textbook for urban people was created in 1931, followed by a universal amalgamated textbook. LMA member, I. A. Shpitsberg began publishing a scholarly journal in the late 1920s called Ateist. It was changed to Voinstvuiuschii ateizm (Militant Atheism) in 1931 and it was published by the LMA central council. In 1932 it was swallowed up by Antireligioznik.

From 1928 to 1932, a journal for peasants named Derevenskii bezbozhnik (The Rural Godless) was produced. It was alleged to be so "popular" among the peasantry that it was 'read to tatters', and contradictorily it ceased publication in 1932. The supposedly popular nature of the atheist propaganda was also contradicted by cases of reported lynchings of antireligious propagandists and murder of LMA agitators. In a similar vein, in 1930, the LMA leadership advised that social surveys of believers in school classes where the majority of pupils were believers was harmful, and that such data should not, as a principle, be used. Another such anecdote can be found in the 1929 Moscow religion survey, in which 12,000 industrial workers were surveyed anonymously and only 3,000 returned the survey, of which 88.8% claimed to be atheists, and it was then declared that 90% of Moscow industrial workers were atheists.

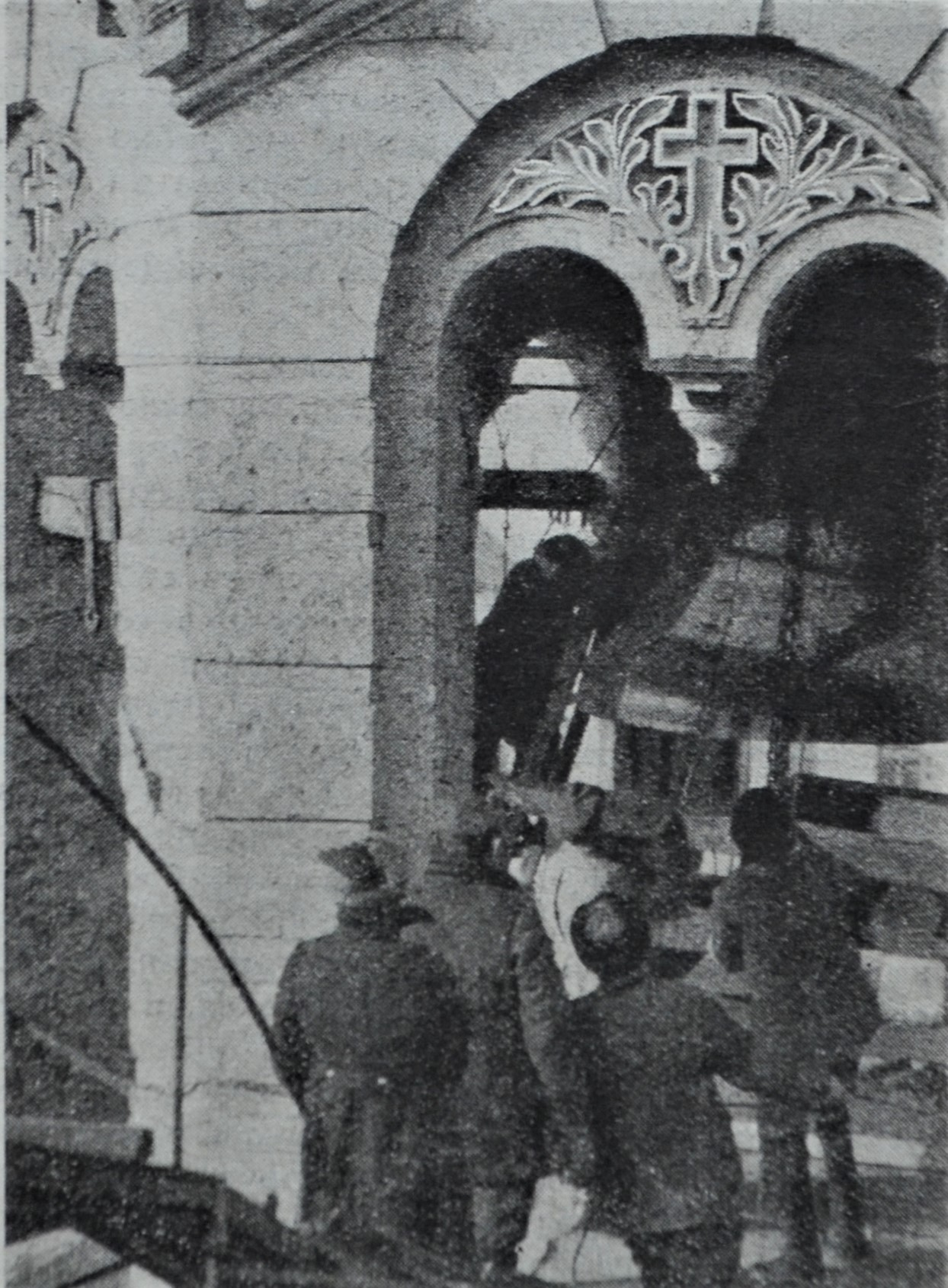
The anti-religious activists remove the large (5000 kg) bell from the St Volodymyr's Cathedral central Kiev USSR (now Ukraine).

The non-serial LMA literature grew from 12 million printed pages in 1927 to 800 million in 1930 (making up at least 100 million pieces of printed antireligious literature). In 1941 sixty-seven books and brochures of antireligious propaganda were printed with a total circulation of 3.5 million copies. Up to 1940 there were about 2000 titles published every year.

A textbook produced by the LMA in 1934 admitted the existence of sincere believers among the intellectuals; however, Yaroslavsky in 1937 claimed that all scholars and scientists who believe in God were insincere deceivers and swindlers.

The League trained a massive number of antireligious propagandists and other workers. This work included lecture cycles. The League of Militant Atheists attempted to "control and exploit the Proletarian Freethinkers," a group founded by socialists in 1925, in order to diminish the influence of religion, particularly Catholic Christianity, in Central and Eastern Europe.

The League of Militant Atheists aided the Soviet government in killing clergy and committed believers. The League also made it a priority to remove religious icons from the homes of believers. Under the slogan, "the Storming of Heaven," the League of Militant Atheists pressed for "resolute action against religious peasants" leading to the mass arrest and exile of many believers, especially village priests. By 1940, "over 100 bishops, tens of thousands of Orthodox clergy, and thousands of monks and lay believers had been killed or had died in Soviet prisons and the Gulag."

The LMA had reduced the number of religious communities of all faiths from 50,000 in 1930 to 30,000 by 1938 and 8,000 by 1941. The last figure includes, however, 7,000 communities in the annexed western territories (so that only 1,000 actually remained in the rest of the country).

== Disbandment ==
The climate of the campaign against religion was changing in the late 1930s and early 1940s. The regime slowly became more moderate in its approach to religion. Yaroslavsky, in 1941 warned against condemning all religious believers, but said that there were many loyal Soviet citizens still possessing religious beliefs. He called for patient and tactful individual work without offending the believers, but "re-educating" them. He claimed that religion had disappeared in some parts of the country but in other parts (especially in the newly annexed territories) it was strong, and he warned against starting brutal offensives in those areas.

He alleged that there were very few attempts to re-open churches and that this was a sign of the decline in religion. He branded those who tried to re-open churches as "former kulaks" and "falsifiers of figures". This report was contradicted, however, by the LMA's own figures (based on the 1937 census) that found perhaps half the country still held religious beliefs, even if they had no structures to worship in any longer and they could no longer openly express their beliefs.

An answer to this report was found when Nazi Germany invaded in 1941. Churches were re-opened under the German occupation, while believers flocked to them in the thousands. In order to gain support for the war effort (both domestic and foreign), Stalin ended the antireligious persecution and the LMA was disbanded. Internal pressure to end the persecution came from the need to win the loyalty of religious Soviet citizens for the war effort, while external pressure came from the Allies, who would not support Stalin if he continued the campaign. Yaroslavsky turned his attention to other pursuits. In 1942, he even published a positive article about Orthodox writer Dostoevsky, describing his alleged hatred of the Germans. After the death of Yaroslavsky in 1943, the chairman of the organization became Fedor Oleshchuk, who led it until its disbandment.

Most of LMA periodicals ceased to publish by September 1941. In 1947, the organization was formally dissolved.

== See also ==
- Antisemitism in the Soviet Union
- Eastern Catholic victims of Soviet persecutions
- Persecution of Christians in the Eastern Bloc
- Persecution of Christians in the Warsaw Pact countries
- Persecution of Christians in the Soviet Union
- Persecutions of the Catholic Church and Pius XII
- Persecution of Jehovah's Witnesses in the Soviet Union
- Persecution of Buddhists in the Soviet Union
- Persecution of Buddhists in Vietnam
- Persecution of Muslims in the former USSR
- Political religion
- Red Terror
- Soviet Orientalist studies in Islam
- Soviet anti-religious legislation
- State atheism
- Tatar Union of the Godless
- USSR anti-religious campaign (1917–1921)
- USSR anti-religious campaign (1921–1928)
- USSR anti-religious campaign (1928–1941)
- USSR anti-religious campaign (1958–1964)
- USSR anti-religious campaign (1970s–1990)
