= Mebrdzoli Ateisti =

Soviet anti-religious magazine (1932–1941)

Mebrdzoli Ateisti (მებრძოლი ათეისტი), Mebrdzoli Ughmerto (მებრძოლი უღმერთო)
- Cover of the magazine «Mebrdzoli Ughmerto»
- Editor: Sylvester Todria
- Categories: antireligious
- Frequency: Mebrdzoli Ughmerto − several, Mebrdzoli Ateisti − weekly
- Founded: 1932
- Final issue: May, 1941
- Country: Soviet Union
- Based in: Tbilisi
- Language: Georgian

Mebrdzoli Ateisti (Georgian: მებრძოლი ათეისტი; Russian: Воинствующий атеист; translation of the name: "Militant Atheist") was an anti-religious magazine in the Georgian language. It was the publication of the Central Soviet of the League of Militant Atheists of the Georgian Soviet Socialist Republic. The magazine was published in Tbilisi. In 1932, the newspaper Mebrdzoli Ughmerto (Georgian: მებრძოლი უღმერთო; Russian: Воинствующий безбожник; translation of the name: "Militant Godless") began to be published in Tiflis. It left the printing house several. Since 21 issues of 1934 the newspaper changed its name to Mebrdzoli Ateisti and began to be published in the form of a magazine. The editor of the magazine was Sylvester Yasevich Todria. The latest issue of this magazine was published in May 1941. The circulation of the magazine was 6,000 copies. The magazine published materials on the essence of religion, its social and epistemological roots, highlighted certain aspects of the history of religion, examined forms and methods of anti-religious propaganda. In addition to this magazine, other anti-religious periodicals in the Georgian language were also published, in 1933-1934 the newspaper «Sakartvelos Ugmerto» (Georgian: საქართველოს უღმერთო; translation of the name: «The Godless of Georgia») was published, and then the magazine «Religiis Tsinaagmdeg» (Georgian: რელიგიის წინააღმდეგ; translation of the name: «Against Religion»)

== Notes ==
- მებრძოლი უღმერთო ტფილისი, 1932-1934
- მებრძოლი ათეისტი ტფილისი, 1934-1941
