= Bolesław Przybyszewski =

Soviet musicologist (1892–1937)

Boleslaw Stanislavovich Przybyszewski
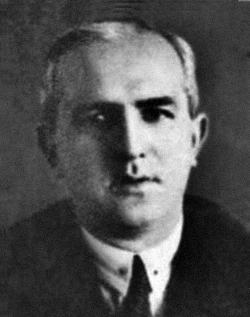
- Director of the Moscow Conservatory (1929—1932)
- Born: Bolesław Przybyszewski; 22 January 1892; Berlin
- Died: 21 August 1937 (aged 45); Moscow
- Occupation(s): Musicologist, teacher

Boleslaw Stanislavovich Przybyszewski (Polish: Bolesław Przybyszewski; 22 February 1892 – 21 August 1937) was a Soviet public person, teacher, and musicologist. Head of the Moscow Conservatory in 1929–1932.

== Life ==
Boleslaw Przybyszewski was born in Berlin on 22 February 1892; he was an illegitimate son of the Polish writer Stanisław Przybyszewski. His mother Marta Foerder committed suicide on 9 June 1896. The boy was taken to his father's parents in Kuyavia, then a part of the Russian Empire. Later they moved to Wągrowiec. Due to his grandmother's influence, young Boleslaw developed a keen interest in music. In 1912 he moved to Warsaw and entered the Chopin University of Music. During World War I he was interned and forcibly moved to Orsk. On 14 October 1918, he married Emilia Nidekker, a daughter of the former city mayor and lieutenant colonel in reserve of the Imperial Army. In August 1919, when the Cossacks retreated and left the city, Przybyszewski stayed in Orsk and took an active part in public and cultural life. In January 1920 he published an open letter in the local press, where he openly criticized "all vulgar and crude attacks" on his father.

In 1920 Przybyszewski moved to Moscow and joined the CPSU. He started working at the Communist University of the National Minorities of the West as an inspector of the specialised secondary music schools. Later he headed the music department of the People's Commissariat for Education.

In 1929 Przybyszewski was given the rector's post at the Moscow Conservatory. At that time the state policy was to actively 'proletarize' the conservatories, accepting only class-approved students and also striving to restructure the staff and curricula with Marxist standards. The professors reacted to such reforms negatively; they already were in a bitter conflict with the RAMP due to its obvious harm to musical standards with ideology, vulgarism and dilettantism. The kapellmeister Konstantin Saradzhev recalled the reforms of 1930–1931 as 'pernicious for the conservatory. The new curriculum cut the hours for most important disciplines and burdened the students with completely unnecessary lessons, such as political-economic studies...'. Saradzhev and several other distinguished professors left the conservatory, however, the core staff stayed. The new director gained a reputation as an odious figure. In 1931 the conservatory was renamed after Feliks Kon, Przybyszewski's superior. The renaming caused particular outrage. The institution immediately received a vulgar nickname 'Horse school', based on wordplay in Russian, where "Kon" pronounced with the soft last consonant means 'horse'. Memories of Przybyszewski's years as the head of the conservatory were highly controversial. In the memoirs of the composer Vissarion Shebalin, Przybyszewski was described as a 'typical intellectual in a bad way: a weak, unreliable person who strived to look nice in everyone's eyes. The conservatory was alien to him and he did nothing good to it.'

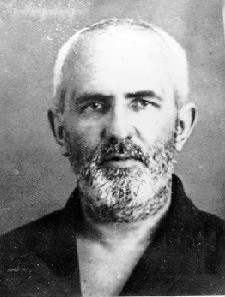
Boleslaw Przybyszewski in prison

Another professor and a colleague Grigory Kogan remembered Boleslaw Przybyszewski as a "man of the highest morality, who, unfortunately, was succumbed by the RAMP mottos and tried to shape the conservatory's education accordingly". On the contrary, the composer Vladimir Shcherbachov mentioned Przybyszewski as a "very interesting man, who led a highly intellectual and intense cultural life, a great dreamer, passionate and dedicated to his ideas up to the extremes. He read aloud to me some chapters from his work on Beethoven, which I found very profound. His notes on Bach as a harmonist in the first place, not a polyphonist, were also intriguing and profoundly explained from a sociological point of view. We also talked about my plans and affairs, all conversations with him were very intense and demanding." However, in later publications the director was often described as a despot and a strict censor. By late 1931, the influence of the new political movements in music fading, on 11 February 1932 Przybyszewski was removed from the director's post.

Boleslaw Przybyszewski fell victim to the Soviet repressions. In 1933 he was expelled from the CPSU during Stalin's purges. Then he was accused of homosexuality, a criminal offense in the USSR, and sentenced to three years. He served the sentence at the Belbaltlag forced labor camp at the White Sea–Baltic Canal construction. At the camp, he was appointed to the post of the Belbaltlag's Central Theatre and raised its performance to a high standard. Przybyszewski was released on 7 January 1936, but continued his work at the theatre. His second arrest followed on 1 March 1937. On 21 August, the Military Collegium of the Supreme Court of the Soviet Union sentenced him to be shot on counts of espionage and planning acts of terrorism. The sentence was carried out on the same day. Przybyszewski was posthumously rehabilitated as a victim of the political repressions on 15 September 1956. His wife Emilia Nidekker was also repressed and imprisoned in 1937; she was released in 1945, ill with tuberculosis, and died in 1946. In Solomon Volkov's Testimony, the prosecution of Przybyszewski was mentioned as an example of political terror upon musicians and intellectuals.

== Sources ==
- Averintsev, Sergey (1989). Lazarev, V. (ed.). Что с нами происходит?: Записки современников [What’s Happening to Us? Memoirs of my Contemporaries] (in Russian). Vol. 1. Sovremennik. p. 371. ISBN 9785270007812.
- Elagin, U. B. (2002). Укрощение искусств [Taming the Arts] (in Russian). The Russian Way. p. 384. ISBN 5-85887-119-4.
- Kogan, G. M. (2016). ""Случилось так, что я родился..."" [It happened so that I was born...]. Urals Mussorgsky State Conservatoire Journal (in Russian). No. 12. p. 94.
- Kuzyakina, N. (2009). Театр на Соловках, 1923–1937. ДБ. p. 175. ISBN 9785860076082.
- Nizhnick, E. V. (2014). "Судьбы германских и австро-венгерских подданных польского происхождения, депортированных в Оренбургскую губернию в годы Первой мировой войны" [German and Austro-Hungarian Captives of Polish Origin, Interned to Orsk during World War I]. Orsk Museum of Regional Studies (in Russian). Orsk.
- Raku, Marina (2014). Музыкальная классика в мифотворчестве советской эпохи [Classical Music in Soviet Mythogenesis] (in Russian). Moscow: Novoe Literaturnoe Obozrenie. p. 1060. ISBN 978-5-4448-0377-6.
- Skryabin, A. S.; Nikolaeva, A. U., eds. (2015). "Наш Старик". Александр Гольденвейзер и Московская консерватория [“Our Old Man”. Alexander … and the Moscow Conservatory] (in Russian). Moscow: Humanitarian Initiatives Centre. p. 704. ISBN 9785040061693. }
- Shebalin, Vissarion (1970). "Доцентура. О советской песне. Турксиб". Articles. Memoirs. Documents [Assistant Professorship. On Soviet Songwriting. Turksib] (in Russian). Moscow.
- Vlasova, E. S. (2010). 1948 год в советской музыке [1948 in Soviet Music] (in Russian). Moscow: Klassika XXI. p. 472. ISBN 978-5-89817-323-4.
- Volkov, Solomon (2004). Testimony: The Memoirs of Dmitri Shostakovich. Limelight Editions; 8th Anniversary ed. edition. p. 338. ISBN 978-0879109981.
