= Antireligioznik =

Soviet anti-religious magazine (1926–1941)

Antireligioznik (Антирелигиозник)
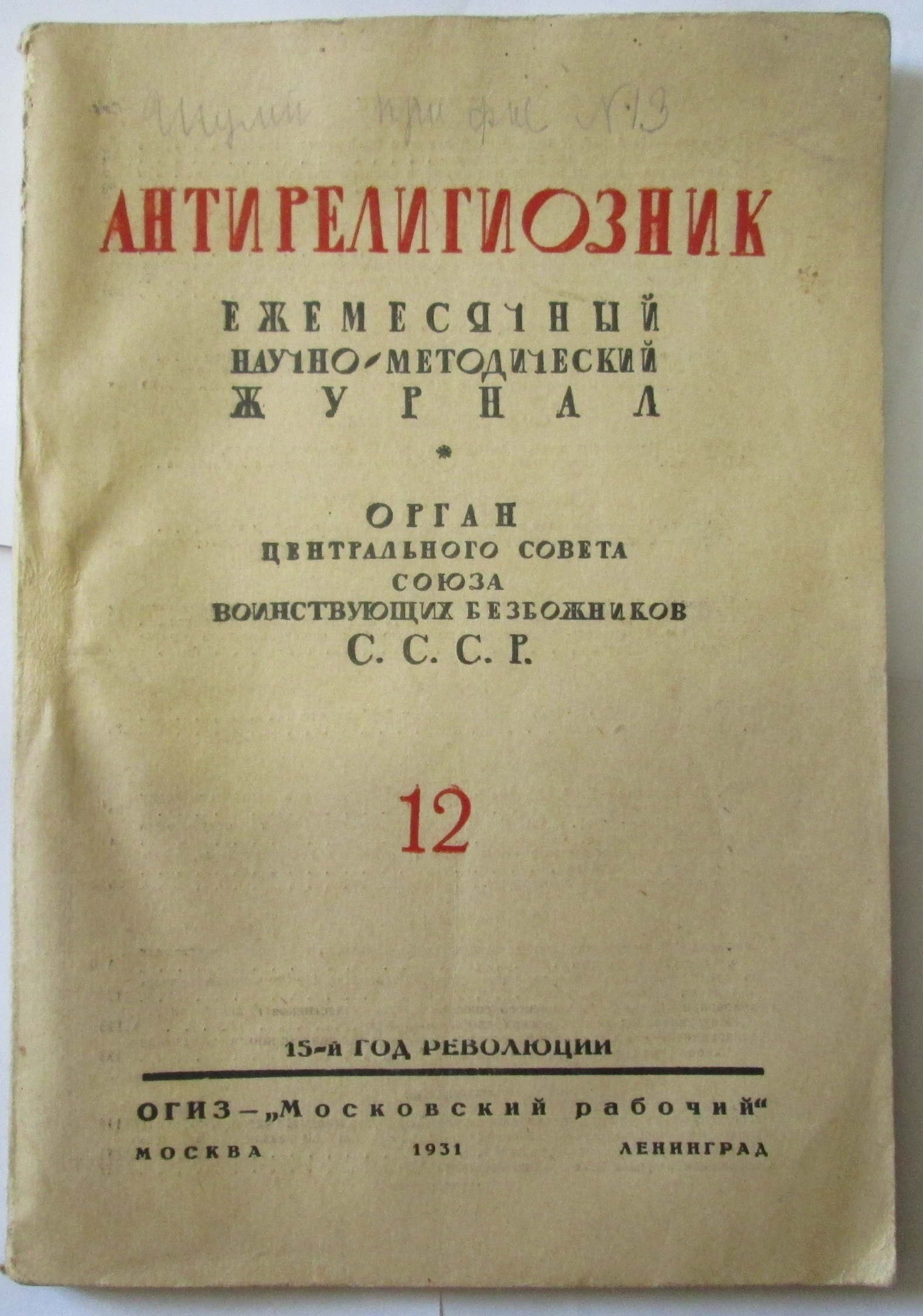
- Editor: Y. M. Yaroslavsky
- Categories: antireligious
- Frequency: Monthly
- Founded: January, 1926
- Final issue: June, 1941
- Country: Soviet Union/Russia
- Based in: Moscow
- Language: Russian

Antireligioznik (Russian: «Антирелигиозник»; translation: Opponent of religion, lit. Antireligionist) was a monthly anti-religious and atheistic magazine in Russian, the organ of the Central Council of the League of Militant Atheists of the USSR, and was published in Moscow from January 1926 to June 1941.

The editor of the publication was Yemelyan Yaroslavsky. Antireligioznik systematically covered the experience of the atheistic work of the League of Militant Atheists, published articles on the history of religion and atheism, propagated atheism, and addressed from a Marxist standpoint questions of criticism of religion.

Antireligioznik had a volume of about 130 pages, consisting of articles with headings such as "Anti-religious education in school", "Letters from the field", "Chronicle", "Methodology of anti-religious propaganda", and "Criticism and bibliography." Among the magazine's authors were Vladimir Bonch-Bruyevich, Nadezhda Krupskaya, Aleksandr Timofeevich Lukachevsky (deputy editor), and activists of the League of Militant Atheists. The section "Chronicle" contained detailed information on the League of Militant Atheists' actions in various regions of the USSR. In the section "Criticism and Bibliography", reviews were published on books of anti-religious content (Ateist, Bezbozhnik and others), and reviews of current publications on atheistic topics were given. The magazine developed the ideological foundations of mass atheist propaganda, directed primarily against Orthodoxy carried out through the lower organizations (cells) of the LMG. Antireligioznik also published articles and notes directed against Catholicism and Protestantism.

After 1960, the USSR published the magazine Nauka i religiya (Russian: «Наука и религия», lit. Science and Religion).

== See also ==
- Bezbozhnik (newspaper)
- Council for Religious Affairs
- Persecutions of the Catholic Church and Pius XII
- Persecution of Christians in the Soviet Union
- Persecution of Muslims in the former USSR
- Religion in the Soviet Union
- State atheism
- USSR anti-religious campaign (1928–1941)
