= Ateist =

Ateist (Атеист)
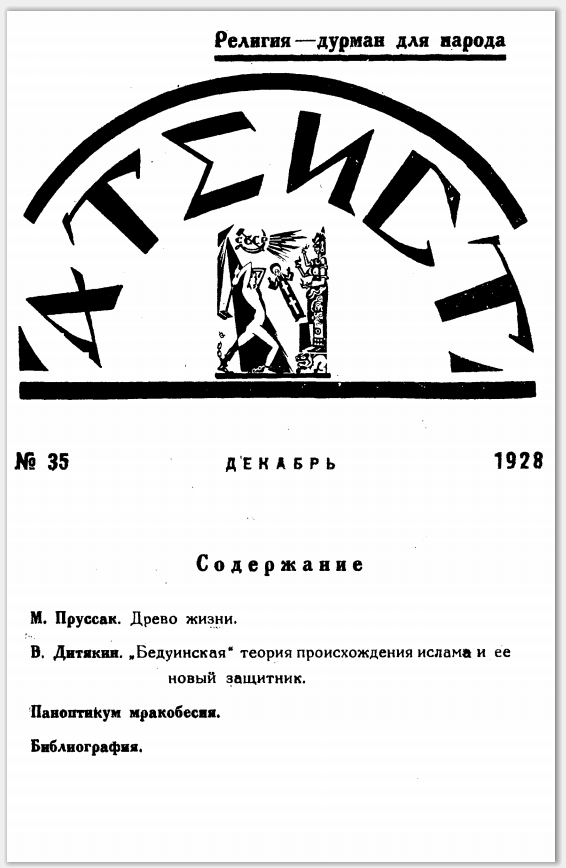
- December, 1928 issue of Atheist
- Editor: I. A. Spitzberg
- Categories: antireligious
- Frequency: Monthly
- Circulation: 4,000
- Founded: 1922
- Final issue: 1930
- Country: Soviet Union/Russia
- Based in: Moscow
- Language: Russian

Ateist (Russian: «Атеист»; lit. «Atheist») was an antireligious monthly journal in Russian, which was published from 1922 to 1930 in the RSFSR and the USSR.

Ateist was established in 1921 in Moscow, on the initiative of P. A. Krasikov and I. A. Shpitsberg in order to promote leading works that were critical of religion. Shpitsberg became the editor-in-chief of the journal. The first two issues of the publication Atheist were printed in the form of a newspaper in 1922, in February and March. The format of the newspaper was considered uncomfortable, and it was therefore published as a journal instead. From April 1922 to April 1925, the journal was published on a continual basis. Further, between 1925 and 1930, 59 issues were released.

The main objective of the journal was to highlight perceived issues throughout the history of religion, particularly concerning its role in the previous Russian empire, as well as to document the development of atheism as a philosophical position. The journal also intended to help foster the Soviet policies of state atheism by highlighting the spread of atheism in the USSR and abroad, in addition to providing translations of material from Western bourgeois scholars regarding religion and the church. Emphasis was put upon criticizing organized religion as a power structure and its supposed incompatibility with Soviet thought.

The editorial board of the journal consisted of: N. Rumyantsev, V. Shishakov, E. Fedorov-Greekulov, I. Voronitsyn, professor S. A. Kamenev, professor S. G. Lozinsky, professor V. T. Dityakin and I. A. Shpitsberg (editor-in-chief). The slogan of the journal, printed on the front page, read: "Religion is a datura for the people" (Russian: «Религия — дурман для народа»). Dmitry Moor created the logo for Ateist. Ateist's publisher was located at: Moscow, Granatny Lane, house 1. The bookstore was located at: Malaya Nikitskaya Street, house 12.

In 1931, the League of Militant Atheists began publishing the journal Voinstvuiuschii ateizm (Russian: «Воинствующий атеизм»; lit. «Militant Atheism»). This journal served henceforth as a replacement for Ateist.

== See also ==
- Bezbozhnik (newspaper)
- Revolution and Church
- Council for Religious Affairs
- Culture of the Soviet Union
- Demographics of the Soviet Union
- Persecutions of the Catholic Church and Pius XII
- Persecution of Christians in the Soviet Union
- Persecution of Christians in Warsaw Pact countries
- Persecution of Muslims in the former USSR
- Red Terror
- Religion in Russia
- Religion in the Soviet Union
- Society of the Godless
- Soviet Orientalist studies in Islam
- State atheism
- USSR anti-religious campaign (1917–1921)
- USSR anti-religious campaign (1921–1928)
- USSR anti-religious campaign (1928–1941)
- USSR anti-religious campaign (1958–1964)
- USSR anti-religious campaign (1970s–1990)

== Notes ==
- «Православие : Словарь атеиста» / [Беленкин И. Ф. и др.]. / Под общей редакцией доктора философских наук Н. С. Гордиенко/ - М. : Политиздат, 1988. - 270,[2] с.; 17 см.; ISBN 5-250-00079-7 / С. 32
- Журнал "Атеист"
- Издательство «Атеист»
- Журнал "Атеист" (3 фото)
- Издательство «Атеист»
- Атеизм
- Журнал "АТЕИСТ"-1925
