= State anti-religious publishing =

Soviet publishing house

The State Anti-Religious Publishing House (Russian: Государственное антирелигиозное издательство) (GAIZ) was a Soviet publishing house which existed from 1932 to 1942.

== History ==
Established in 1932 in Moscow, Russia as part of OGIZ, (Note: Объединение государственных книжно-журнальных издательств, the Association of state book and magazine publishing houses) the government-owned publishing conglomerate, it was governed by the Central Board of the League of Militant Atheists.

== Directors ==
- A. S. Bogad

== Publishing activities ==
GAIZ released anti-religious literature, including books on atheism, the history of religion, the attitudes of the ВКП(б) (Note: Всесоюзную Коммунистическую партию (большевиков), All-Union Communist Party (Bolsheviks), a name used for the Soviet Communist party between 1925 and 1952) about religion, about the origin and history of religion, and the church.

Published works include:

- E. M. Yaroslavsky "Against religion and the church," Vols. 1–5. (1932–1936) (Russian: Против религии и церкви)
- I. I. Skvortsov-Stepanov "Thoughts on Religion" (1936) (Russian: Мысли о религии)
- V. K. Nikolsky "The Origin of Religion" (1940) (Russian: Происхождение религии)
- A. B. Ranovich "Essays on the History of the Early Church" (1941) (Russian: Очерки истории раннехристианской церкви)
- Baruch Spinoza "Tractatus Theologico-Politicus" (1934)
- P. Holbach "Selected works of anti-religious" (1934)
- Ernst Haeckel "Riddle" (1937).
- Newspaper "Bezbozhnik" and "Antireligioznik" magazines.

== Literature ==
- Novikov, Mikhail Petrovich; Novikova, M.P., eds. (1985). "ГАИЗ (GAIZ)". Atheistic Dictionary (in Russian) (2nd, revised and expanded ed.). Moscow: Политиздат (Politizdat).
- Sheinman, M. M. (1964). ГАИЗ, Государственное антирелигиозное издательство [GAIZ, State Anti-Religious Publishing House]. Словарь атеиста [The Atheist's Dictionary] (in Russian). Издательство политической литературы (Publishing house of political literature).
