= Mark Persits =

Russian atheist and historian (1908-1986)

Mark Mendelevich Persits (Russian: Марк Менделевич Персиц, c. 1908–1986) was a Soviet propagandist of atheism, a scientific worker in the study of problems of religion and atheism, a writer, and a historian of social thought.

Persits was senior researcher at the Institute of History of the USSR Academy of Sciences. In 1952, he defended his thesis for the degree of candidate of historical sciences on the topic «Decree of the Council of People's Commissars of the RSFSR of January 23 (February 5), 1918 "On the separation of church from state and school from the church" and its historical significance».

He studied the history of Marxist atheism and atheism and the history of free thinking and the struggle for freedom of conscience in Russia. Persits suggested that the success of an atheist lecture depended not so much on the content as on the lecturer.

== Work ==
- Персиц, Марк Менделевич. Иудаизм в царской России и в СССР. / Воинствующее безбожие в СССР за 15 лет. 1917–1932: сборник / Центральный совет Союза воинствующих безбожников и Институт философии Коммунистической академии; под редакцией М. Енишерлова, А. Лукачевского, М. Митина. – Москва : ОГИЗ : Государственное антирелигиозное издательство, 1932. – 525, 2 с. : ил., портр.;
- Сюжетный лист к серии диапозитивов Как возникла религия. / Авторы: М. Ю. Енишерлов, Н. Р. Минлос, М. А. Персиц; Ред. А. Т. Лукачевский; Фабрика "Диафото". Главучтехпром. – [Москва] : Центр. совет Союза воинств. безбожников СССР, [1935] (тип. ф-ки 7 "Диафото"). – 4 с.;
- Как возникла религия. : (Пояснит. текст к серии диапозитивов на кинопленке) / Авторы: М. Ю. Енишерлов, Н. Р. Минлос, М. А. Персиц; Ред. А. Т. Лукачевский; Центр. совет Союза воинств. безбожников СССР. – [Москва] : 5 тип. Трансжелдориздата, 1936. – 16 с.;
- Персиц, Марк Менделевич. Декрет Совета Народных Комиссаров РСФСР от 23 января (5 февраля) 1918 г. "Об отделении церкви от государства и школы от церкви"и его историческое значение : Автореферат дис. на соискание учен. степени кандидата ист. наук / Ин-т истории Акад. наук СССР. – Москва : [б. и.], 1952. – 13 с.;
- Персиц, Марк Менделевич. Разговор двух приятелей о пользе наук и училищ» В. Н. Татищева как памятник русского свободомыслия XVIII в. // Вопросы истории религии и атеизма, сб. 3. М., 1956.
- Персиц, Марк Менделевич. Мораль и религия / Канд. ист. наук М. М. Персиц. – М.: Знание, 1957. – 32 с.;
- Персиц, Марк Менделевич. Отделение церкви от государства и школы от церкви в СССР (1917 – 1919 гг.) М.: Наука, 1958.
- Персиц, Марк Менделевич. Морал и религия / Канд. на ист. науки М. М. Персиц; Прев. от рус. Катя Койчева. – София : Профиздат, 1958. – 67 с.;
- Персиц, Марк Менделевич. Атеизм русского рабочего. (1870–1905 гг.) / Акад. наук СССР. Ин-т истории. – Москва : Наука, 1965. – 256 с.;
- Деятели Октября о религии и церкви (Статьи, речи, воспоминания). М., 1968.
- Ленин об атеизме, религии и церкви. Сборник статей, писем и других материалов. М., 1969.
- К.Маркс, Ф.Энгельс. Об атеизме, религии и церкви. Сост.: Г. С. Лялина, М. М.Персиц, Ю. Б. Пищик. М., 1986.
