= Vladimir Kapitonovich Nikolsky =

Soviet historian and ethnologist (1894–1953)

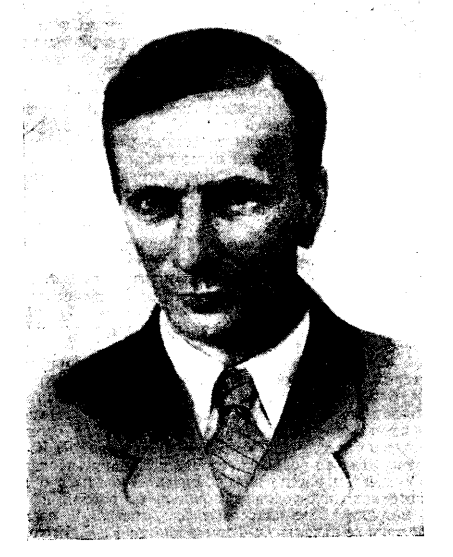
Vladimir Kapitonovich Nikolsky

Vladimir Kapitonovich Nikolsky (Russian: Владимир Капитонович Никольский; 20 September 1894, Yaroslavl – 17 October 1953, Moscow) was a Soviet historian, ethnologist, translator, religious scholar, Doctor of Historical Sciences (1943), and professor.

== Biography ==
He was born into the family of an army podporuchik. At age 18, he entered Moscow University. In 1916 he graduated from the Faculty of History and Philology of Moscow University. He was a student of M. K. Lubavsky. He was left at the university to prepare for a professorship. From 1918 to 1925 he taught at the Faculty of Social Sciences; from 1925 to 1930 – at the Faculty of Ethnology; since 1934 – at the Faculty of History (head of the commission on the history of the pre-class society at the Department of the History of the Ancient World), professor of the Department of Ancient History of the Moscow Institute of Philosophy, Literature and History. From 1942 to 1953 he was the head of the Department of Ancient History of the Moscow Regional Pedagogical Institute and professor of the Department of General History of the Moscow State Historical and Archival Institute.

His first published studies, begun in his student years, were devoted to the Zemsky Sobors in Russia in the 17th century. However, the main area of his scientific interests was the history of primitive society and the early forms of religion. Numerous articles and brochures are mainly of a popular scientific nature, devoted to the problems of anthropogenesis, the origin and early forms of religion.

In 1926 he was on a business trip to Europe, where he studied modern literature about early forms of religion in libraries. In the same year he published a large article in the magazine Antireligioznik, devoted to various theories of the origin of religion, where he devoted considerable attention to criticism of the theory of urmonotheismus, and in 1929 he made a large report on this subject at the Communist Academy.

In the late 1920s to the early 1930s, under his editorship and with his preface, translations of the works of European scholars on the history of culture and primitive religion (Heinrich Cunow (The History of the Economy), Lucien Lévy-Bruhl (Supernatural in Primitive Thinking), Edward Burnett Tylor (Primitive Culture), James George Frazer (The Golden Bough)), were published at Ateist and Sotsekgiz publishing houses. In 1931, under his editorship, the first volume of the work Religious Beliefs of the Peoples of the USSR (Russian: Религиозные верования народов СССР) was published. In 1943, he defended his doctoral dissertation on the theme of the Primeval Community (Russian: Первобытная община). In 1952 he joined the Communist Party of the Soviet Union. Nikolsky died after a short illness. He was buried at the Vvedenskoye Cemetery in Moscow.

== Work ==
List of scientific works:

=== Books ===
In Russian

- Рязанское соборное представительство при царях Алексее, Федоре и патриархах / Вл. Никольский. - Рязань : Б. и., 1917 (тип. Любомудрова). – 74 с.; 24 см.
- Очерк первобытной культуры / В. К. Никольский Со вступ. статьей проф. В. А. Городцова. - Москва; Петроград : Л. Д. Френкель, 1923. – 222 с., 1 л. ил. : ил.; 23 см.
- От камня к металлу / В. К. Никольский. - Москва : Молодая гвардия, 1923. – 119 с. : ил.; 17 см.
  - От камня к металлу / В. Никольский. – [2-е изд.]. – Москва; Ленинград : Молодая гвардия, 1924. – 166, [2] с. : ил., табл.; 20 см.
- Первобытная культура : Критико-библиографический указатель / В. К. Никольский. – Москва; Ленинград : Френкель, 1924. – II, 61 с.; 23 см.
- Очерки первобытного человечества / В. К. Никольский. – [Москва] : Новая Москва, 1926. – 320 с. : ил.; 18 см. - (Библиотека молодого коммуниста/ Под общ. ред. МК РЛКСМ. Ред. Вл. Сарабьянова).
- Когда появился человек? : [Объясн. текст к диапоз.] / Проф. В.К.Никольский. – М. : Тип.ЦИТ, [1924]. – 22 с.; 26 см.. – ([Издание] / Культоб-ние Госкино. Изд-во диапоз.; Сер. № [53]). – Библиогр.: с.22.
- Как появилось христианство на Руси / Проф. В. К. Никольский. - Москва : Безбожник у станка, 1926. – 48 с.; 23 см. - (Лекции безбожников).
- Как люди без кузнеца жили. – Москва; Ленинград : Гос. изд-во, 1927 (М. : 1-я Образцовая тип.). – 71 с.+[1] с. объявл. : ил., карт., черт., портр.; 20х13 см. - (Наука для всех).
- Зонлейтнер, А. Пещерные дети : Роман / Зонлейтнер; С предисл. В. К. Никольского. – Москва; Ленинград : Молодая гвардия, 1926 (Л. : тип. изд-ва "Молодая гвардия"). – 358, [2] с. : ил.; 18 см.
- Объяснительный текст к таблице происхождения человека (по ископаемым данным) / Проф. В. К. Никольский; Составленной В. К. Никольским и нарисованной П. П. Ермоловым; Акц. общ. наглядных пособий (АОНАПО). – Москва : тип. "Связь", 1927. – 16 с.; 18х14 см.
  - Объяснительный текст к таблице Происхождение человека (по ископаемым данным) / Проф. В. К. Никольский; Составленной В. К. Никольским и нарисованной П. П. Ермоловым; Гос. акц. общ. наглядных пособий (АОНАПО). – 2-е изд., пересмотр. автором. - Москва : 17-я тип. "Мосполиграф", 1928. – 16 с.; 18х13 см.
- Земский собор о вечном мире с Польшей 1683-84 г. / В.К. Никольский. – Москва : Индустр.-пед. ин-т им. К. Либкнехта, 1928. – 75 с.; 27х18 см. – (Научные труды Индустриально-педагогического института им. К. Либкнехта Социально-экономическая серия; Вып. № 2).
- Первобытная культура. / В. К. Никольский. – Москва : Работник просвещения, 1928. – 95 с.; 18 см. – (Ступени самообразования. Обществоведческий цикл. Ступень 1/ Под ред. А. Г. Калашникова и А. П. Пинкевича. Центр. ком-т Проф. союза работников просвещения СССР. Комис. помощи самообразованию при Культотд. ЦК).
  - Первобытная культура. / В. К. Никольский. – Москва : Работник просвещения, 1928 (7-я тип. "Икра революции" Мосполиграфа). – 96 с. : схем.; 18х13 см. – (Ступени самообразования. Систематические программы самообразовательного чтения. Обществоведческий цикл. Ступень I/ Под ред. А. Г. Калашникова и А. П. Пинкевича. Центр. ком-т Профес. союза работников просвещения СССР. Комиссия помощи самообразованию при Культотд. ЦК).
- Происхождение человека : (По ископаемым данным).. / В. К. Никольский; Обложка: А. Лео. – Москва; Ленинград : Молодая гвардия, [1928] (Л. : тип. изд-ва Молодая гвардия). – 92, [4] с. : ил., черт.; 20х14 см. – (История развития общественных форм в отдельных очерках/ Под ред. проф. В. К. Никольского и доц. В. Д. Преображенского).
- Как появились цари : (По данным архаического Египта) : С 6 рис... / В. К. Никольский; Обложка: А. Лео. - Москва; Ленинград : Молодая гвардия, 1928 ([Л.] : тип. изд-ва "Молодая гвардия"). – 36 с. : ил., карт.; 20х14 см. - (История развития общественных форм в отдельных очерках/ Под ред. проф. К. К. Никольского и доц. В. Д. Преображенского).
- Как человек перестал быть диким : Альбом / Проф. В. К. Никольский; Рис. выполнял и табл. монтировал художник П. П. Ермолов; Центр. совет. Союза воинствующих безбожников СССР и Главполитпросвет НКП. – Москва : Безбожник, 1929 (книжная фабрика Центр. издат. народов СССР). – 64 с. : ил., черт., карт.; 24х32 см.
- Атлас по истории религии / Сост. при участии проф. А. А. Захарова, проф. Е. Г. Кагарова, проф. В. К. Никольского и [др.]; Отв. ред. И. А. Шпицберг. - Москва : Атеист, 1930. – 246, [2] с. : вкл. ил.; 26 см.
- Первобытный коммунизм : [Пояснит. текст к диапозитивам] / Составил В. К. Никольский; Объединение художников реалистов - ОХР. – [Москва] : [издат. ОХР], [1931] (тип. школы ФЗУ Мособлпечатьсоюза). – 4 с.; 14х12 см.
- Религии наименее культурных племен : Сборник этнографич. материалов из работ: Г. Базедова, Д. Блик, А. Броун... и др. / Составили: проф. В. К. Никольский, М. В. Бердоносов; С пред. проф. В. К. Никольского; Центр. совет Союза воинств. безбожников СССР. – Москва; Ленинград : Огиз - Моск. рабочий, 1931 (М. : тип. "Гудок"). – 325, [3] с. : ил.; 25х17 см.
- Религиозные верования народов СССР. Т. 1-2 : Сборник этнографич. материалов / Составлен науч. работниками Центр. музея народоведения: М. Г. Левиным, М. Т. Маркеловым, М. С. Плисецким, С. А. Токаревым, С. П. Толстовым. При участии: А. Г. Аполлова, Е. Р. Бинкевич, Р. С. Липец, Е. М. Шилинга; Предисл. С. Л. Урсыновича; Под общ. ред. проф. Моск. ун-та В. К. Никольского; Центр. совет Союза воинств. безбожников СССР. – Москва; Ленинград : Огиз - Моск. рабочий, 1931 (Рязань : Ряз. тип. "Мосполиграфа"). – 2 т.; 25х18 см.
- Происхождение человека по ископаемым остаткам : Плакат с объясн. текстом : Плакат исполнил худ. А. Люминарский / Проф. В. К. Никольский; Центр. совет Союза воинств. безбожников СССР. – Москва : Гаиз, 1933 (тип. "Образцовая"). – Обл., 12 с., 1 отд. вкл. л. крас. плакат; 24х18 см.
- Лекции по доклассовому обществу / Проф. Никольский; Историч. фак-т 1 МГУ. – Москва : Стеклогр. Пром. комб. Дзерж. райсовета рк и кд, 1934. – Обл., 20, 14, 17 с., без тит. л.; 29х20 см.
- Сюжетный лист к серии диапозитивов "Происхождение и развитие религии" [Текст] / Автор В. Никольский; Ред. И. Гейзер; Фабрика "Диафото" Главучтехпром. - [Москва] : тип. ф-ки № 7 "Диафото", [1935]. – 4 с.; 16х11 см.
- Доисторическая культура / В. К. Никольский; Под ред. Л. Рудаша. - Москва; Ленинград : ОНТИ. Глав. ред. научно-попул. и юношеской лит-ры, 1936 (Л. : тип. им. Бухарина). – Обл., 135 с. : ил.; 19х13 см. – (Научные беседы выходного дня).
- Семья и брак в прошлом и настоящем. / Проф. В. К. Никольский. – Москва : Соцэкгиз, 1936 (18 тип. треста "Полиграфкнига"). – Обл., 86, [2] с.; 19х13 см.
- Происхождение нашего летосчисления. / Проф. В. К. Никольский. – [Москва] : Гаиз, 1938 (Типо-лит. им. Воровского). – 64 с., 1 вкл. л. табл.; 20 см.
- Фашистские бредни и выводы науки о расах : На правах рукописи / Авт. проф. Никольский. - Москва : [б. и.], 1938. – 5 с.; 30 см. – (Микрофонные материалы Всесоюзного радиокомитета. Исключительно для радиовещания. Для Сектора агитации и пропаганды; № 92).
- Возникновение человеческого общества : (Из цикла "История культуры") : На правах рукописи / Проф. В. К. Никольский. - Москва : [б. и.], 1938. – 11 с.; 30 см. - (Микрофонные материалы Всесоюзного радиокомитета. Исключительно для радиовещания/ Глав. ред. ВРК. Ред. "В помощь самообразованию" № 7).
- Как возникла человеческая речь / проф. В. К. Никольский, проф. Н. Ф. Яковлев. – Москва : изд-во и тип. Госкультпросветиздата, 1949. – 64 с., 3 л. ил. : ил.; 17 см.
- Детство человечества (Childhood of Humanity)/ проф. В. К. Никольский. - Москва; Ленинград : Детиздат, 1939 (Москва). – 224 с. : ил.; 20 см. – (Школьная библиотека. [Для неполной средней и средней школы]).
  - Детство человечества (Childhood of Humanity)/ проф. В. К. Никольский. – 2-е изд., испр. и доп. – Москва : изд-во и тип. Госкультпросветиздата, 1950. – 156 с. : ил.; 22 см.
- О воскресном дне (About Sunday). / проф. В. Никольский. – [Гомель] : Гомельский обл. совет Союза воинств. безбожников, [1940]. – 20 с. Без тит. л.; 10 см.
- Новейшие данные науки о происхождении человека (Latest Science Data about the Origin of Human). Беседа 2 : На правах рукописи / Проф. В. К. Никольский. - Москва : [б. и.], 1940. – 1 бр.; 30 см. – (Микрофонные материалы Всесоюзного радиокомитета : Исключительно для радиовещания. Для Сектора пропаганды и агитации; № 66).
- Происхождение религии (The Origin of Religion)/ проф. В. К. Никольский; редактор – П. Н. Федосеев; художник А. Фролов. – Москва : Центральный Совет Союза воинствующих безбожников СССР, 1938. – 39 отд. л. : ил.; 24 см. – (Фотосерия).
- Происхождение религии (The Origin of Religion): (Пояснит. текст к серии диапозитивов) / Проф. В. К. Никольский; Центр. сов. союза воинствующих безбожников СССР. - Москва : [б. и.], 1940. – 27 с.; 14 см.
- Происхождение религии (The Origin of Religion). – Москва : ГАИЗ, 1940. – 104 с. : ил.; 20 см.
  - Происхождение религии (The Origin of Religion). / В. К. Никольский. – 2-е изд., испр. – Москва : изд-во и тип. Госкультпросветиздата, 1949. – 88 с. : ил.; 22 см.
  - Происхождение религии (The Origin of Religion). – Кишинев : Гос. изд-во Молдавии, 1950. – 99 с. : ил.; 20 см. – (Библиотечка по научно-атеистическим вопросам).
- Великие русские полководцы : [Александр Невский, Дмитрий Донской, Минин и Пожарский, Александр Суворов, Михаил Кутузов] : Книга для внекл. чтения учащихся неполной сред. школы : Утв. НКП РСФСР / В.И. Лебедев, В.К. Никольский и М.Н. Тихомиров. – Москва : Учпедгиз, 1943. – 88 с. : ил.; 22 см.
  - Наши великие предки : Книга для внеклассного чтения учащихся неполной сред. школы. – [2-е изд.]. – Москва : Учпедгиз, 1948 (Тип. М-316 Тип. М-104). – 108 с. : ил.; 20 см.. – (Школьная историческая библиотека).
- Почему люди говорят на разных языках? : Стенограмма публичной лекции д-ра ист. наук В. К. Никольского, прочит. 6 апреля 1945 г. в Лекционном зале в Москве / Лекционное бюро при Ком. по делам высш. школы при СНК СССР. - Москва : [б. и.], 1945. – 20 с.; 22 см.
- Почему люди говорят на разных языках. / проф. В. Никольский. – Сталинград : Обл. книгоизд-во, 1947 (Камышин : тип. Упр. изд-в и полиграфии). – 24 с.; 20 см. – (Научно-просветительная библиотека).
- История первобытного общества : Учеб.-метод. пособие для студентов-заочников пед. ин-тов : Ист. фак. / проф. В. К. Никольский; Гл. упр. высш. учеб. заведений М-ва просвещения РСФСР. Науч.-метод. кабинет по заоч. обучению учителей. – Москва : Учпедгиз, 1948 (Свердловск : 5-я тип. треста "Полиграфкнига"). – 64 с.; 22 см.
- Наши великие предки : Книга для внеклассного чтения учащихся неполной сред. школы / В. И Лебедев, В. К. Никольский, М. Н. Тихомиров. – 2-е изд. – Москва : Учпедгиз, 1948 (тип. М-316). – 168 с. : ил.; 20 см. – (Школьная историческая библиотека).
- История первобытного общества : Учеб.-метод. пособие для студентов-заочников пед. и учительских ин-тов / проф. В. К. Никольский; Гл. упр. высш. учеб. заведений М-ва просвещения РСФСР. Науч.-метод. кабинет по заоч. обучению учителей. - Москва : Учпедгиз, 1951. – 96 с.; 22 см.

In Yiddish

- Fun shteyn tsu metal / V. Nikolski; Yidish – D. Hokhberg פון שטיין צו מעטאל / וו. ניקאָלסקי; אידיש - ד. האָכבערג. – Moskve : Shul un bukh, 1925. – 128 с. : Ил.; 22 см.. – מאָסקווע, 1925. - 128 с. : Ил.; 22 см.. – Москва : Школа и книга, 1925. – 128 с. : Ил.; 22 см.. – Объяснение слов (ווערטער-פארטייטשונג): С. 124–126.
- Di opshtamung funem mentsh / Prof. V. Nikolski un prof. M. Nesturkh; [Yidish - F. Altshuler] די אָפּשטאמונג פונעמ מענטש / פּראָפ. וו. ניקאָלסקי אונ פּראָפ. מ. נעסטורכ; [יידיש - פ. אלטשולער]. – Moskve : OGIZ; Der emes, 1947. – 63 с. : Ил.; 16 см. – מאָסקווע : אָגיז; דער עמעס, 1947. – 63 с. : Ил.; 16 см. – Москва : ОГИЗ; Дер эмес, 1947. – 63 с. : Ил.; 16 см.
- Farvos reydn mentshn af farsheydene shprakhn / Prof. V. Nikolski un prof. N. Yakovlev; Forvort un redaktsie fun akademiker I.I. Meshtshaninov [Yidish - R. Fish] פאָרוואָס ריידנ מענטשנ אפ פארשיידענע שפּראכנ / פּראָפ. וו. ניקאָלסקי אונ פּראָפ. נ. יאקאָוולעוו; פאָרוואָרט אונ רעדאקציע פונ אקאדעמיקער אי.אי. מעשטשאנינאָוו [יידיש - ר. פיש]. – Moskve : OGIZ; Der emes, 1947. – 71 с.; 16 см. – מאָסקווע : אָגיז; דער עמעס, 1947. - 71 с.; 16 см. – Москва : ОГИЗ; Дер эмес, 1947. – 71 с.; 16 см.

In German

- Als die Menschen ohne Schmieide lebten / W. Nikolsky; Deutch von N. Dyck. – Moskau etc. : Zentralverlag Allukr. Abt., 1931. – 59 с. : ил.; 18 см. – (Deutsche Schuler-Bibliotek).
- Wie die Menschen sprechen lernten : Die Entwicklung der Sprache aus ihren Uranfängen / W. K. Nikolskij – N. F. Jakowlew; Aus dem Russ. übertr. von Hilde Koplenig. - Wien : Globus, 1950. – 54 с. : ил.; 19 см. – (Tagblatt-Bibliothek; № 1325).

In Hungarian

- A vallás keletkezése / V. K. Nyikolszkij; Forditotta: Olah Jozsef. – 2. kiadás. – Budapest : Szikra, 1950. – 143 с. : ил.; 19 см.
- Nagy orosz hadvezérek / V. I. Lebegýev, V. K. Nyikolszkij, M. N. Tyihomirov; Fordította dr. Vajda Pál. – Budapest : Művelt nép, 1950. – 102 с.; 20 см.

In Bulgarian

- Защо хората говорят на различни езици / проф. В. Николски, проф. Н. Яковлев. – София : Българската работническа партия комунистив, 1947. – 56 с.; 18 см.
- Как хората се научили да говорят / Проф. В. К. Николски. Проф. Н. Ф. Яковлев; Преведе от руски Кирила Ан. Георгиева. – София : Народна култура, 1947. – 86 с. : ил.; 17 см. – (Библиотека популярна наука / Ред. Ив. Панчев; № 14).

In Slovak

- Dejiny prvotno-pospolnej spoločnosti / V. K. Nikol'skij; Z rus. prel. J. Kopaničak. - Bratislava : Slovenska akad. vied, 1953. – 134 с.; 21 см.

In Croatian

- Zašto ljudi govore različitim jezicima / Prof. V. Nikolski i prof. H. Jakovljev; Predgovori red. akad. I. I. Mješčaninova. - Beograd; Zagreb : Kultura, 1946. – 57 с.; 17 см.

In Serbian

- Зашто људи говоре на разним језицима : Прев. с рус. / проф. В. Никољски и проф. Н. Јаковљев; Предговор и ред. акад. И. И. Мјушчањинова : Београд; Загреб : Култура, 1946. – 60 с.; 17 см.

In Slovenian

- Kako so se ljudje naučili govoriti / Prof. V. K. Nikolskij in prof. N. F. Jakovljev; pod uredništvom akademika J. J. Mešaninova; Prevedel dr. phil. Maks Robič. – Ljubljana : Slovenski knjižni zavod, 1946. – 32 с.; 20 см. - (Poljudno znanstvena knjižnica; 7).

In Yakut

- Биһиги улуу ѳбүгэлэрбит : сэттэ кылаастаах оскуола үѳрэнээччилэрин кылаас таһыгар ааҕар кинигэлэрэ / В. И. Лебедев,В. К. Никольскай, М. Н. Тихомиров. - Якутскай : САССР Госиздата, 1952. – 118, [2] c. : ил.; 22 см. – (Оскуолатааҕы историческай библиотека).

=== Translations ===
- Фрейзер, Джеймс Джордж. Золотая ветвь : [исследование по сравнительной истории религий] / Дж. Дж. Фрэзер; пер. с однотом. изд. Я. М. Глана, провер. по полн. двенадцатитом. изд. 1911 – 1915 г. проф. А. А. Захаровым; под ред. и со вступ. ст. проф. В. К. Никольского; Центр. совет Союза воинствующих безбожников СССР. – [2-е изд.]. – Москва : Огиз Московский рабочий; Ленинград : Огиз Московский рабочий, 1931. – 26 см.
- Леви-Брюль, Люсьен. Первобытное мышление / Л. Леви-Брюль; Пер. с франц. под ред. проф. В. К. Никольского и А. В. Киссина; С пред. ред. "Атеиста", члена Акад. наук СССР Марра, Н. Я., проф. 1 Моск. унив. В. К. Никольского и автора к русск. изд. – [Москва] : Атеист, [1930] (Л. : гос. тип. им. Евг. Соколовой). – XXXI, 337, [1] с., [4] с. объявл. : ил., портр.; 26х.
- Тейлор, Эдуард Бернетт. Первобытная культура : Пер. с англ. / Под ред., с предисл. ["Место Эдуарада Тейлора в исследовании первобыт. культуры", с. III-XXX] и прим. В. К. Никольского. – Москва : Соцэкгиз, 1939. – XXX, 570 с. : ил.; 27 см.
