= Mikhail Galkin =

Russian Orthodox priest turned anti-religious writer

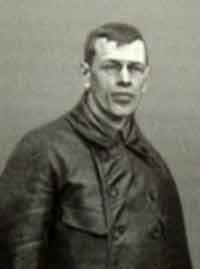
- Born: Mikhail Vladimirovich Galkin; 10 March 1885; Saint Petersburg, Russian Empire
- Died: 28 March 1948 (aged 63); Kharkov, Ukrainian SSR, Soviet Union
- Other name: Gorev (Russian: Го́рев)

Mikhail Vladimirovich Galkin (Russian: Михаил Владимирович Галкин; 10 March 1885 – 28 March 1948) was a Russian Orthodox priest, spiritual writer and preacher who became an active figure in atheistic propaganda and an anti-religious writer in 1918.

Galkin drafted the Decree on Separation of Church and State as well as a number of articles and reports on its implementation. A prolific writer, the list of his books and brochures in the National Library of Russia amounts to 58 items.

== Early life ==
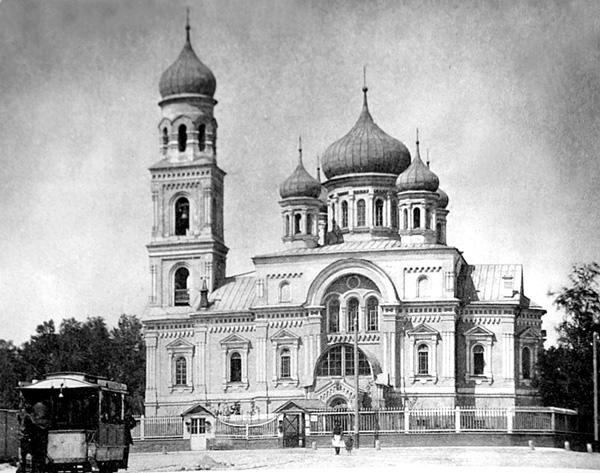
The Transfiguration Church (demolished in 1932) in Saint Petersburg where the rectors were first Vladimir Galkin then Mikhail Galkin

Mikhail Galkin was born in Saint Petersburg into the family of Vladimir Pavlovich Galkin who was a Russian Orthodox priest.

In 1903, Mikhail graduated from the full course of the classical Vvedenskaya gymnasium with a silver medal. That same year, he entered the Imperial Military Medical Academy, but was expelled from the first year with the wording "as having stopped taking transfer exams without good reason." In August 1904, Galkin entered the Faculty of Law of the Saint Petersburg Imperial University, where he attended lectures for only six months. In 1905, he passed exams as an external student at the Ufa Theological Seminary for a full course of study, and in 1906 he received the corresponding certificate. On 6 April 1906, Galkin was assigned to the post of priest of the Intercession of the Blessed Virgin Mary house church at the residence of Grand Duchess Maria Nikolaevna in the Zhdanovskaya embankment of Saint Petersburg. On 29 March 1906, he submitted a petition to Saint Petersburg University to resign. On 8 April 1906, the petition was granted and Galkin was expelled from the university student body. On 9 April 1906, Galkian was ordained a deacon at the Saint Isaac Cathedral. On April 16, 1906, he was ordained a priest there. On September 10, 1908, he entered the St. Petersburg Theological Academy. On September 25, 1908, Mikhail Galkin was allowed to perform priestly duties at the house church of the Intercession of the Blessed Virgin Mary at the shelter of Grand Duchess Maria Nikolaevna, which he performed until October 14, 1909.

In 1908, Archpriest Vladimir Pavlovich Galkin and his son Priest Mikhail Galkin began publishing a monthly anti-alcohol magazine Трезвые всходы (Sober Shoots). They published the magazine until 1914 inclusive. The magazine published analytical materials collected from foreign sources and domestic statistics related to alcohol consumption. In addition to the magazine, the Galkins published brochures as a supplement to the magazine. The magazine and supplements were sent to subscribers throughout Russia. Priest Michael was published in almost every issue as an author and as a translator. He did not finish his studies at the theological academy, but left there in his third year. Galkin at this time became a famous spiritual writer. His book about the devotees of piety of the 19th century, "In the Service of God," published in 1905–1906 in three volumes, became a bestseller. In 1996, it was republished by the Sretensky Monastery.

On August 6, 1911, Galkin was appointed an ordinary priest of the Transfiguration Koltovskaya Church, where his father was the rector at that time. In August 1914, Priest Mikhail petitioned the Protopresbyter of the Military and Naval Clergy, Georgy Shavelsky, to appoint him to the active army while maintaining his parish place for the duration of hostilities. On November 15, 1914, Shavelsky issued order No. 882 on the secondment of priest Mikhail Galkin to the Salyan 206th Infantry Regiment. "For excellent and diligent performance of pastoral duties on the battlefield under enemy fire," Mikhail Galkin was awarded the Order of St. Anne, third degree with swords. On September 22, 1915, by resolution of Metropolitan Vladimir of Petrograd and Ladoga, Priest Mikhail Galkin was appointed to the vacant position of rector of the Transfiguration Koltovskaya Church. While being a rector, Galkin simultaneously led the Koltovsky branch of the All-Russian Alexander Nevsky Temperance Brotherhood, headed the Koltovsky parochial school, was a fellow chairman of the Nikolaev Charitable Society for the Care of the Poor, and edited the "Leaflet of the Koltovsky Parish" in 1916.

== Changing worldview and activities ==
Mikhail later wrote that at this time there were changes in his worldview: "Moving around in the circle of workers, among whom were social democrats, I became acquainted with the class struggle and for the first time with Marx, the pamphlets of Engels, Lafargue and others." In 1917, Priest Mikhail Galkin began publishing in the Menshevik-Internationalist newspaper "New Life"; he headed the "church department" in it. Mikhail Galkin visited Maxim Gorky and had "conversations with him on topics about religion, ... and about the unfolding struggle of the proletariat in Russia, the role of the church in it." In 1917, Galkin, as an editor-publisher, independently began publishing the weekly newspaper "Free Church". The newspaper was first published in Petrograd, and then, during the meetings of the Local Council, its publication was moved to Moscow.

After the October Revolution, Galkin decided to go to work for the Soviet regime. He wrote in his memoirs: "Immediately after the October Revolution, having read in the newspapers the call of Comrade. Trotsky to participate in work with the Soviet Government, I am going to Smolny, to comrade Lenin and ask him to give me a job anywhere and by anyone, in any office abandoned by the scattered intelligentsia. Vladimir Ilyich, after a 10-minute conversation in which, as it seemed to me, he was testing my convictions, he recommends that I refrain from clerical work for now, and that it is better to write an article in Pravda on the issue of separation of church and state. For further information, he directs me to V.D. Bonch-Bruyevich."

== Participation in the separation of church and state ==
Galkin prepared a "rough draft" of the decree "to delineate the sphere of activity of the state and the sphere of the purely church," which included the following points:

"Religion is declared a private matter for every person. Church and religious communities are declared to be private unions completely freely managing their affairs... the teaching of the Law of God... is not mandatory... the registration of births, marriages and deaths is transferred from the disposal of churches to special government bodies... A non-denominational state is declared to be in effect in the Russian Republic. The institution of civil marriages is established (a decree on this follows first)... On January 7, 1918, the Gregorian calendar was introduced throughout the Russian Republic."

In total, the draft draft contained eleven points and seven sub-points. In fact, it was the priest Mikhail Galkin who prepared the draft Decree on the separation of church from state and school from church.

In an accompanying letter to the text of the article sent to the Council of People's Commissars, Galkin emphasized: "The article can be published either under the initials "M." G." or with my full signature – priest "Mich. Galkin", but in this last case only if you call me to work in your ranks, since it should be clear to you that after the publication of this article I cannot imagine remaining among the fanatical, almost pagan masses for another day."

On November 27, 1917, the Council of People's Commissars, having familiarized itself with the text of the letter from "priest Galkin offering his services to the Council of People's Commissars in the field of separation of church and state and in a number of other areas with the attachment of an article for the newspaper," made a decision (minutes No. 12, paragraph 7):

"the letter <...> to be submitted to Pravda for printing from the initials. Galkina. Instruct <...> to review the letter and article of the priest. Galkin, call Galkin for negotiations and give it to the Sov. Nar. Com. your opinion about the possibility of attracting the priest. Galkin to active work and to what post."

The appearance of the article became a sensation and had a stunning effect on church circles. The Petrograd diocesan authorities were concerned about finding the author of this article. They almost found him. On Monday, December 11, Priest Galkin was summoned for negotiations by the Bishop of Luga, vicar of the Petrograd diocese Artemy.

At this time, Galkin in Petrograd, at his own expense, began to publish the non-partisan diocesan newspaper "Banner of Christ" - instead of the newspaper "Free Church". The newspaper "Banner of Christ" became for a short time the mouthpiece of that part of the clergy that wanted the separation of church and state.

On December 11, 1917, at a meeting of the Council of People's Commissars, a special commission was created, which should "develop a general plan of action" to "accelerate" the issue of separation of church and state. The commission included Anatoly Lunacharsky, Pyotr Stuchka, Pyotr Krasikov, Mikhail Reisner and priest Galkin.

In mid-April 1918, a special interdepartmental commission was created under the People's Commissariat of Justice of the RSFSR, whose goal was to develop the text of instructions for implementing the decree on the separation of church from state and school from church.

The commission included individual government members and lawyers. It was planned that representatives of various religious associations, both Christian and non-Christian, would take part in the meetings of the commission. On the urgent recommendation of Commission member Vladimir Bonch-Bruyevich, the interdepartmental commission decided to involve M.V. Galkin in its work. However, on May 8, 1918, the Council of People's Commissars abolished the interdepartmental commission, and instead of it, under the People's Justice Committee, within its structure, created a special department to implement the decree on the separation of church from state and school from church. The department was headed by Deputy People's Commissar of Justice Pyotr Krasikov. The department was assigned the serial number VIII, and it was called "liquidation"; in 1922-1924 the department was renamed the V "cult" department. The task of the department was to ensure the "liquidation" of administrative and managerial hierarchical church structures. In addition, the VIII Department was obliged to assist the relevant departments in "suppressing the counter-revolutionary activities of religious associations."

== Atheism ==
By the summer of 1918, Galkin moved to Moscow. On June 1, 1918, he was appointed "expert" of the VIII Department.

On July 15, 1918, Mikhail Galkin officially renounced the priesthood. At the end of 1918, Mikhail Vladimirovich submitted an application to join the RCP (b), and on January 1, 1919, he was accepted as a member of the RCP (b).

From 1918 to 1922, Galkin served in the VIII department of the People's Commissariat of Justice, first as an ordinary "expert"; later - deputy head of the department. On April 11, 1919, he participated in the opening of the shrine with the relics of Sergius of Radonezh and signed the autopsy protocol as a delegate of the People's Commissariat of Justice.

Galkin and Krasikov in 1919 initiated the creation of the monthly magazine "Revolution and the Church", Krasikov was the executive editor of this magazine, Galkin was the co-editor of the magazine. Galkin published many of his articles on the pages of the magazine: "Communism and Religious Rites", "Trinity Lavra and Sergius of Radonezh", "At the Autopsy", "Acts of State". In 1919–1920, the leadership of the VIII Department of the People's Justice initiated a campaign to open the relics of Orthodox saints with the subsequent termination of access to them by believers. Galkin showed increased initiative in this matter. At the beginning of September 1919, speaking to the population with a lecture "On Communism and Religion," together with Krasikov, he proposed to confiscate all the relics from the Church and collect them in a special museum. On August 9, 1920, Patriarch Tikhon addressed letters to the chairman of the Council of People's Commissars Lenin and the chairman of the All-Russian Central Executive Committee Mikhail Kalinin, in which he personally mentioned the name of Galkin among those employees of the VIII Department of the People's Justice, whose actions "are clearly dragging the RSFSR onto the thorny path of persecution of religions by the State and oppression freedom of conscience." People's Commissar of Justice Dmitry Kursky in the text of M.V. Galkin's service description dated January 19, 1921, after the words "Indispensable for work in the field of implementing the decree of separation of church and state," he made a note: "Requires leadership."

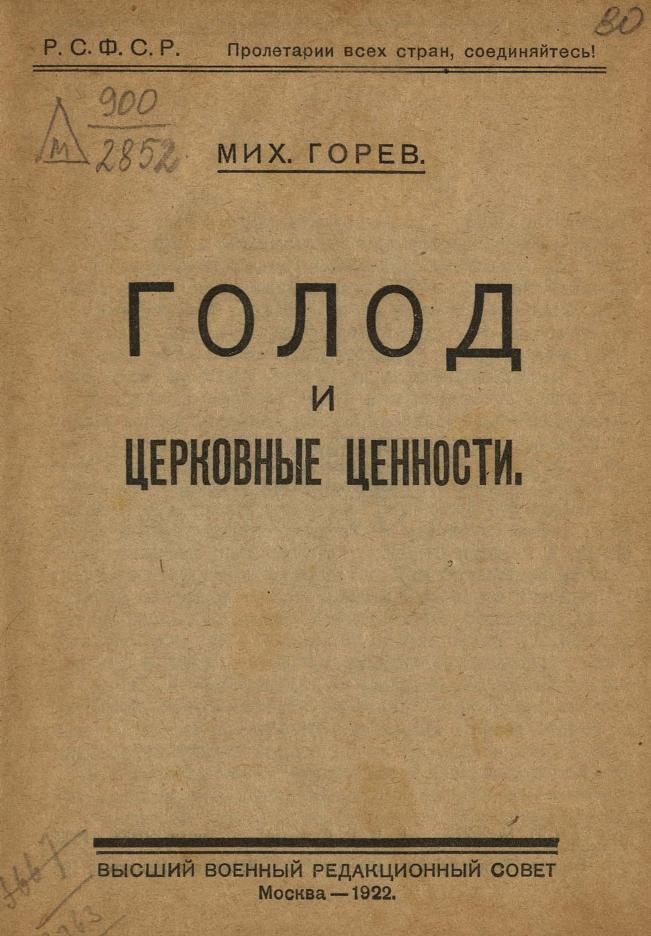
The book Голод и церковные ценности (Hunger and Church Values) published in 1922

Since March 1922, Galkin took part in the work of the "commission for accounting and concentration of values" headed by Leon Trotsky. On March 11, the Politburo of the Central Committee of the RCP (b) issued a resolution introducing Galkin to the commission for the confiscation of valuables from Moscow churches ("Commission for the confiscation of valuables in the Moscow province"). Since March 20, Galkin was part of the so-called. "Literary Commission" at the Bureau of the Central Scientific and Cultural Center. Galkin, together with Krasikov, on behalf of the "Commission under the Agitation Department of the Central Committee on the issue of leaflets and brochures on the campaign for the confiscation of church valuables," participated in the work of the "editorial troika." In the spring and summer of 1922, the GPU attracted Galkin "as a consultant" to the process of preparing and organizing a schism in the ranks of the Orthodox Church. On May 18, the leadership of the GPU sent a letter to Trotsky with a request to allow the use of Galkin "as a consultant on spiritual affairs." On May 29, the Organizing Bureau of the Central Committee of the RCP (b), having heard the question "About the work of Comrade Gorev-Galkin," decided: "Do not object to combining the work of Comrade Gorev-Galkin with Comrade Trotsky with work in the SO (Secret Department) of the GPU as consultant on clergy affairs." The head of the VI department of the GPU SO, Evgeniy Tuchkov, in a report on July 24 addressed to the head of the GPU SO, Timofey Samsonov, mentioned that the renovationist Higher Church Administration for the Affairs of the Orthodox Russian Church acts in accordance with Galkin's directives. From June to November 1922, a newspaper was published (and until September, a magazine of the same name) under the general title " Science and Religion ," of which Galkin was the executive editor; these publications were supposed to contribute to causing a split in the ranks of the Orthodox clergy. From the beginning of the 1920s, Galkin was one of the party workers included in the nomenklatura register of the Central Committee of the RCP (b). Until 1926, Mikhail Galkin-Gorin conducted active propaganda work in the " Atheist " system; until June 1926, he served as deputy chairman of the executive bureau of the Central Council of the Union of Militant Atheists of the USSR, receiving high praise from the leadership. However, from the autumn of 1925 to the spring of 1926, Galkin became embroiled in a conflict within the leadership of the Union of Militant Atheists. In April 1926, Gorev (Galkin) wrote a letter of resignation. The Executive Bureau of the Central Council of the Security Council at a meeting on April 1, 1926, under pressure from Emelyan Yaroslavsky, decided: "to relieve Comrade Gorev from the duties of Deputy [m]. Prev. Executive Bureau and in general from any regular work in the Central Council of the S.B. USSR." After this, Gorev tried to find support from the leadership of the Bolshevik Party, but to no avail.

From July 1926 to March 1928, Galkin, as head, was responsible for the work of the party life department of Rabochaya Gazeta (Moscow). In the spring of 1928, Galkin left for permanent residence in Ukraine. From March 1928 to July 1931, he served as an "anti-religious propagandist" in the structures of the Union of Miners in the cities of Gorlovka and Artemovsk . From July 1931 to July 1933, Galkin held the position of head of the personnel sector of the All-Ukrainian Industrial Association of Wholesale and Retail Trade of Books and Cultural Goods in the city of Kharkov . From the summer of 1933, Galkin began teaching at universities in the city of Kharkov: from August 1933 to January 1935, Galkin headed the "socio-economic" department at Infizkult; from January 1935 to January 1937 he was a professor and chairman of the methodological council of professors at the Kharkov Institute of Mechanization and Electrification of Agriculture. On February 7, 1935, the Oktyabrsky District Committee of the city of Kharkov decided to consider M.V. Galkin "mechanically dropped out" from among the members of the CPSU (b); Probably, they were talking about the loss of their party card). He was reinstated in the party ranks with a break in party service, by a resolution of the Party Collegium of the Central Control Commission under the Central Committee of the All-Union Communist Party of Bolsheviks only on August 22, 1938, with the simultaneous imposition of a severe reprimand for careless storage of party documents. During the Great Patriotic War, Galkin was evacuated in Novosibirsk, headed the department of Marxism–Leninism at the Novosibirsk Institute of Geodesy, Aerial Photography and Cartography Engineers, and was also involved in leadership work in the local Union of Atheists.

Galkin died on 28 March 1948.
