= Nikolai Rumyantsev (historian) =

Soviet author (1892–1956)

Nikolai Vasilyevich Rumyantsev (Russian: Николай Васильевич Румянцев, 1892–1956) was a Soviet author of several polemics on the history of Christianity, translator. He was also a member of the Soviet circle "Atheist" and the League of Militant Atheists. In the 1920s Rumyantsev was one of the leading proponents of the so-called mythological school in the Soviet academia. He authored such publications, as "The Pre-Christian Christ" (Russian: "Дохристианский Христос", 1926), "The Pagan Christs – the Ancient Precursors of Christianity" (Russian: "Языческие христы: Античные предшественники христианства", 1929), "The Apocalypse – The Revelation of John" (Russian: "Апокалипсис - откровение Иоанна, его происхождение и классовая роль", 1934) and "Orthodox Holidays, Their Origin and Class Essence" (1936). "The Apocalypse – The Revelation of John" was published under the influence of Abram Ranovich. In that publication Rumyantsev, while not explicitly retracting his earlier opinions, offered a study of early Christianity which stressed not its derivation from supposed ancient mythology, but its intrinsic relation to revolutionary, messianic elements in contemporary Judaism.

== Works ==
=== Books ===
- Православные праздники : их происхождение и классовая сущность / Николай Румянцев. – 3-е изд., доп. и испр. - Москва; Рязань : Русская Правда, 2011. – 461 с. : ил.; 21 см. – (Библиотека атеиста).; ISBN 978-5-904021-10-8 (в пер.);
- Дохристианский Христос / Н. Румянцев. – Москва : Атеист, 1926. – 108 с.;
- Рождественская мифология / Н. Румянцев. – Москва : Атеист, 1924. – 37, [2] с. : ил.;
- Великий шантаж : [Реликвии христа] / Н. Румянцев. - [Ржев] : Атеист, [1926]. – 78 с. : ил.;
- Миф об Иоанне крестителе / Н. Румянцев. – 2-е изд., перераб. – Москва : Атеист. тип. Комбината в Борисове, [19--]. – 40 с.;
- Языческие христы: Античные предшественники христианства / Н. Румянцев. – Москва; Ленинград : Гос. изд-во, 1929 (М. : 1-я Образцовая тип.). – 192 с.;
- Рождество христово, его происхождение и классовая роль / Н. Румянцев. – Москва : Гос. антирелиг. изд., 1937. – 42 с.;
- Рождество христово его происхождение и классовая роль / Н. Румянцев. – Смоленск : Смолгиз, 1937 (тип. ОУМП). – 47 с.;
- Смерть и воскресение спасителя : (Исследование из области сравнительной мифологии) / Н. Румянцев. – Москва : Атеист, [1925].;
- Рождество Христово, его происхождение и классовая роль / Н. Румянцев. – Горький : Обл. изд., 1937 ([тип.] "Полиграф"). – 47 с.;
- Воздвижение и первый спас : Из истории церковного календаря / Н. Румянцев. – 3-е изд. – [Москва] : [Атеист], [1930] (Рязань : Рязгостип. в Рязани). – 28 с.;
- Мощи новозаветных героев : (С 12 рис.) / Н. Румянцев. – [Москва] : Науч. о-во Атеист, [1927] (тип. ОГПУ им. т. Воровского). – 32 с. : ил.;
- Жил ли Иисус Христос? / Н. Румянцев. – Москва : ГАИЗ, 1937 (тип. изд-ва "Крестьян. газ."). – Обл., 55 с.;
- Святой Тихон Амафунтский: (исследование из области культа святых) / Н. Румянцев. – Москва : Атеист, [1925]. – 46, [1] с. : ил.;
- Воздвижение и первый спас : Из истории церковного календаря / Н. Румянцев. – 2-е изд. – [Москва] : Атеист, [1929] ("Мосполиграф" 18 тип. им. М. И. Рогова). – 24 с. : ил.;
- Православные праздники, их происхождение и классовая сущность / Н. Румянцев. – 2-е изд., перераб. - Москва : Гаиз, 1936 (17 ф-ка нац. книги треста "Полиграфкнига"). – Переплет, 448 с. : ил.;
- Воздвижение и первый спас: Из истории церковного календаря : (С 2 табл.) / Н. Румянцев. – [Москва] : Атеист, [1929] ("Мосполиграф" 18 тип. им. М. И.Рогова). – 24 с. : ил.;
- Вознесение – троица - духов день : (Из истории церковного календаря) / Н. Румянцев. – [Москва] : Атеист, [1929] ("Мосполиграф", 18 тип. им. М. И. Рогова). – 44 с. : ил.;
- О престольных праздниках. - Москва : ГАИЗ, 1939. – 48 с.;
- Против пасхи. - Москва : ГАИЗ, 1939. – 44 с. : ил.;
- Погода и ее предсказание. - Москва : ГАИЗ, 1941. – 48 с. : ил.;
- Миф о Христе и христовы праздники. – Москва : ГАИЗ, 1940. – 64 с. : ил.;
- О престольных праздниках. - Москва : Воениздат, 1940. – 32 с.; 20 см. – (Антирелигиозная библиотека)!
- Пасха, ее значение и происхождение. – [Москва] : Безбожник, [1929]. – 32 с.;
- Живял ли е Исус Христос. - Киев : Укрдържнацмениздат, 1939. – 86 с.;
- Происхождение и классовая сущность праздника рождества христова. - Москва : ГАИЗ, 1939. – 48 с.;
- Происхождение рождества Христова. – Москва : ГАИЗ, 1938 (Школа ФЗУ треста "Полиграфкнига"). – 44 с.;
- Происхождение христианства и его краткая история. – Москва : Воениздат, 1940 (Ленинград). – 56 с. : ил., карт.; 19 см. – (Антирелигиозная библиотека);
- Жил ли Иисус Христос. – 2-е изд., доп. – Москва : ГАИЗ, 1938 (Школа ФЗУ треста "Полиграфкнига"). – 56 с.;
- Летние церковные праздники и их реакционная роль. – Калинин : Калин. обл. лит. изд-во, 1939. – 90 с.;
- Православные праздники, их происхождение и классовая сущность. – Киров : Обл. изд-во, 1938 (Типо-лит. Облместпрома). – 264 с.;
- Пасха, ее происхождение и значение. – [Москва] : Безбожник, [1929]. – Обл., 32 с.; 15 см. - (Материалы для массовой работы в избах-читальнях, клубах и красных уголках/ Союз безбожников СССР и Главполитпросвет);
- Летние религиозные праздники. - Москва : акц. изд-во "Безбожник", [19--] (тип. "Гудок"). – 30 с., [2] с. объявл.; 15х11 см. – (Материалы для массовой работы в избах-читальнях, клубах и красных уголках/ Союз безбожников СССР и Главполитпросвет);
- Осенние религиозные праздники. – [M.] : Акц. изд. о-во "Безбожник", [1929] (тип. "Гудок"). – 30 с., 1 л. бланка заказа; 15х11 см. - (Материалы для массовой работы в избах-читальнях, клубах и красных уголках/ Союз безбожников С.С.С.Р. и Главполитпросвет);
- Пасха и ее происхождение и значение. – Москва : акц. изд. о-во "Безбожник" : Мосполиграф, [19--] (14-я тип.). – 32 с.; 15х11 см. – (Материалы для массовой работы в избах-читальнях, клубах и красных уголках/ Союз безбожников СССР и Главполитпросвет);
- Рождество христово, неговото произхождение и класовата му роля. – Киев : Държ. изд. на нац. малц. в УССР, 1938 (9 полигр. ф-ка ГУП и КП). – 64 с.;
- Великий шантаж / Н. В. Румянцев. – 3-е изд. – Москва : Атеист, [1929]. – 1 т.;
- Пасхальная мифология / Н. В. Румянцев. – Москва : Атеист, 1924. – 249 с. : ил.;
- Миф о Иоанне Крестителе / Н. В. Румянцев. – Москва : Атеист, 1923. – 64 стб. : ил.;
- Пророк Илия / Н. В. Румянцев. – 4-е изд. – [Москва] : Атеист, [1930] (Рязань : Гостип.). – 68 с.;
- Рождество Христово : Очерк сравнительной мифологии / Н. В. Румянцев. – Москва : Атеист, 1923. – 16 с. : ил.;
- Происхождение пасхи : Из истории церковного календаря / Н. В. Румянцев. – [Москва] : Атеист, [19--]. – 72 с. вкл. ил.;
- Пророк Илия : С 13 рис. / Н. В. Румянцев. – 2-е изд. – [Москва] : Атеист, [1929] ([Рязань] : Рязгостип.). – 68 с. : ил.;
- Жила-ли дева Мария? / Н. В. Румянцев. – 2-е изд. – [Москва] : Атеист, [1929] (Рязань : Гостип. в Рязани). – 64 с. : ил.;
- Жила-ли дева Мария? / Н. В. Румянцев. – 3-е изд., испр. - [Москва] : Атеист, [1929] (Рязань : Гостип. в Рязани). – 92 с. : ил.;
- Масляница : Из истории церковного календаря / Н. В. Румянцев. - [Москва] : Атеист, [1930] ([Рязань] : Гостип.). – 46, [2] с. объявл.;
- Пророк Илия : С 10 рис. / Н. В. Румянцев. – 3-е изд. - [Москва] : Атеист, [1930] (Борисов : тип. Комбината). – 67 с. : ил.;
- Происхождение пасхи [Текст] : Из истории церковного календаря / Н. В. Румянцев. – 2-е изд., (испр.). - Москва : Атеист, [19--] (Рязань : Гостип.). – 83 с., [1] с. объявл.;
- Преображение господне : Из истории церковного календаря / Н. В. Румянцев. – 2-е изд., доп. - [Москва] : Атеист, [1930] (Рязань : Гостип.). – 24 с.;
- Пророк Илия : С 15 рис. / Н. В. Румянцев. – [M.] : Атеист, [1928] (17-я тип. "Мосполиграф"). – 74, [6] с., из них 4 с. объявл. : ил.;
- Жила ли дева Мария? / Н. В. Румянцев. – [Москва] : Атеист, [1929] ("Мосполиграф" 18 тип. им. М. И. Рогова). – 64 с. : ил.;
- Великий шантаж : Мощи ветхозаветных и новозаветных героев / Н. В. Румянцев. – 5-е изд., испр. и доп. С 41 ил. – Москва : Атеист, [19--] (Вологда : тип. "Северный печатник"). – 123, [3] с., 2 с. объявл. : ил.;
- Преображение господне : Из истории церковного календаря / Н. В. Румянцев. – Москва : Атеист : Мосполиграф, [19--] (14-я тип.). – 16 с.;
- Крещение. Сретение. Благовещение : Из истории церковного календаря / Н. В. Румянцев. – 2-е изд., испр. – [Москва] : Атеист, [1930] (Рязань : Гостип. в Рязани). – 47 с., [1] с. объявл.;
- Происхождение пасхи : Из истории церковного календаря / Н. В. Румянцев. – Москва : Атеист : Мосполиграф, [19--] (18 тип. им. М. И. Рогова). – 72 с. : ил.;
- Вознесение. Троица. Духов день : Из истории церковного календаря / Н. В. Румянцев. – 3-е изд. - [Москва] : Атеист, [1930] (Рязань : Гостип. в Рязани). – 48 с.;
- Крещение. Сретение. Благовещение : Из истории церковного календаря / Н. В. Румянцев. – [M.] : Атеист, [1929] ("Мосполиграф", 18 тип. им. М. И. Рогова). – 36 с.;
- Великий шантаж / Н. В. Румянцев. – Изд. 3-е. – Москва : Атеист, [19--]. – 27 см.;
- Pochodzenie i klasowa treść święta "bożego narodzenia" / M. Rumiancew. – Kijów : Ukrderżnacmenwydaw, 1940 (Lwowie). – 64 s.;
- Православные обряды и праздники и их происхождение / [Предисл. Ф. Олещука]. – [Москва] : Изд. и ф-ка юношеской книги изд-ва "Мол. гвардия", 1938. – 95 с.;
- Что за праздник тройца? / Н. Румянцев; Центр. совет Союза безбожников СССР. – [M.] : "Мосполиграф", 14-я тип., [1929]. – 3 с.;
- Миф об Иоанне крестителе / Н. Румянцев; Обложка: Сер[гей] Поп[ов]. – 3-е изд., перераб. – [Москва] : Атеист, [1930] ([Рязань] : Рязгостип.). – 46 с.;
- Миф об Иоанне крестителе / Н. Румянцев; Обложка: Сер[гей] Поп[ов]. – 4-е изд., перераб. – [Москва] : Атеист, [1930] (Рязань : Окружная тип. "Мосполиграф"). – 48 с.;
- Богородицыны праздники / Н. Румянцев; Центр. совет Союза воинствующих безбожников СССР. – Москва : Безбожник, 1930 (14 тип. "Мосполиграф"). – 68, [2] с., [2] с. объявл.;
- Происхождение рождества христова / Н. Румянцев; Центр. совет Союза воинств. безбожников СССР. – Москва; Ленинград : Огиз – Моск. рабочий, 1931. – 80 с.;
- Происхождение рождества христова / Н. Румянцев; Центр. совет Союза воинствующих безбожников СССР. – Москва : Безбожник, 1930 (тип. изд-ва "Дер эмес"). – 78, [2] с.;
- Православные праздники, их происхождение и классовая сущность / Н. Румянцев; Центр. сов. Союза воинствующих безбожников СССР. – Москва : Гос. антирелигиозное изд-во, 1933. – 293 с. : ил.;
- Пасха, ее происхождение и значение / Н. Румянцев; Центр. совет Союза воинств. безбожников СССР. – 3-е изд., испр. – Москва; Ленинград : Огиз - Моск. рабочий, 1931 (М. : 13-я тип. Огиза). – 64 с.;
- Пасха, ее происхождение и значение / Н. Румянцев; Центр. совет Союза воинств. безбожников СССР. – 4-е изд., испр. и стер. – Москва; Ленинград : Огиз – Моск. рабочий, 1931 (М. : 13-я тип. Огиза). – 64 с.;
- Православные праздники, их происхождение и классовая сущность / Н. Румянцев; Центр. совет Союза воинств. безбожников СССР. – Москва : Гаиз, 1933 (тип. изд-ва "Крест. газ."). – Переплет, 293, [3] с. : ил.;
- Происхождение рождества христова / Н. Румянцев; Центр. совет Союза воинств. безбожников СССР. – Москва; Ленинград : Огиз – Моск. рабочий, 1931 (М. : тип. изд-ва "Дер эмес"). – 80 с.;
- Рождество христово, его происхождение и классовая роль / Н. Румянцев; Калин. обл. оргбюро Союза воинств. безбожников. – Калинин : Обл. изд. Тип. изд-ва "Пролет. правда", 1937. – 40 с.;
- Жил ли Иисус христос / Н. Румянцев; Центр. совет Союза воинств. безбожников СССР. – Москва; Ленинград : Огиз – Моск. рабочий, 1931 (М. : тип. изд-ва "Дер эмес"). – 30, [2] с.;
- Осенние религиозные праздники в крестьянском быту / Н. Румянцев; Центр. совет Союза воинств. безбожников СССР. – Москва; Ленинград : Огиз – Моск. рабочий, 1931 (М. : 13-я тип. Огиза). – 43, [2] с., 2 с. объявл.;
- Рождество христово, его происхождение и классовая роль [Текст] / Краснодар. совет Союза воинств. безбожников. – 2-е изд., испр. – Краснодар : Тип. Изд-ва "Большевик", 1938. – 47 с.;
- Апокалипсис – откровение Иоанна, его происхождение и классовая роль / Н. Румянцев; Переплет: Д. Бажанов; Центр. совет Союза воинств. безбожников СССР. – Москва : Гаиз, 1934 (17 ф-ка нац. книги треста "Полиграфкнига"). – 114, [2] с.;
- Hat Jesus Christus gelebt? / Übertragung aus dem Russischen von A. Wiebach. – 2 ergänzte Aufl. – Киев : Staatsverl. d. nat. Mind. d. USSR, 1939 (9 poligr. F-k). – 111 S.;
- Пасха : (Материалы для лекторов из книги Н. Румянцева "Православные праздники, их происхождение и классовая сущность", глава XIII в сокр. виде) / Горьк. лекционное бюро Облоно и Горьк. обл. совет СВБ. – Горький : тип. изд. газ. "Больш. вахта", 1937. – 26 с.;
- Против религиозных праздников – за новый быт : (Пояснит. текст к серии диапозитивов на кинопленке) / Автор Н. В. Румянцев; Ред. Ф. Н. Олещук; Центр. совет Союза воинств. безбожников СССР. – [Москва] : 5 тип. Трансжелдориздата, [1936]. – 20 с.;
- Происхождение христианства [Текст] / Из подготовленного к печати "Антирелигиозного учебника" под ред. М. Шейнмана. – Алма-Ата : Казпартиздат, 1937 (кн.-журн. тип. НКМП). – 42 с.; 20 см. – (В помощь антирелигиозной учебе);
- Великий шантаж / Н. Румянцев. – [Москва] : Атеист, [1926-1928]. – ил.; 25 см. [Вып. 1]: (Реликвии Христа). – [1926]. – 78 с. : ил.;
- Великий шантаж / Н. Румянцев. – [Москва] : Атеист, [1926-1928]. – ил.; 25 см. Вып. 2: Мощи новозаветных и ветхозаветных героев. – [1928]. – 50 с. : ил.;
- Великий шантаж / Н. В. Румянцев. – 3-е изд. – Москва : Атеист, [1929]. – 1 т.; 26 см. Вып. 2: Мощи новозаветных и ветхозаветных героев . - [1929]. – 48 с. вкл. ил.;
- Смерть и воскресение спасителя : (Исследование из области сравнительной мифологии) / Н. Румянцев. – Москва : Атеист, [1925]. – 25 см. Т. 1. – 1925.

=== Translations ===
- Древс, Артур. Жил ли апостол Петр? / Проф. Артур Древс; Пер. и прим. Н. Румянцева; Предисл. И. Шпицберга. – Москва : Атеист, 1924. – VIII, 100 с. : ил.; 26 см
- Древс, Артур. Жил ли Христос? / Артур Древс; Пер. с нем. Н. В. Румянцева. – Москва : Атеист, 1924. – 46, [1] с., 8 ил.; 26 см.
- Древс, Артур. Миф о Христе. Том I / перевод с 3-его немецкого издания : / А. Древс; под ред. и с предисл. П. А. Красикова. – Москва; Ленинград : Гос. изд-во, 1925. – 208 с. – 24 см.
- Древс, Артур. Миф о Христе. Том II / Проф. А. Древс; Пер. с нем. Н. Румянцева. Под ред. П. Красикова. – Москва : Атеист, 1924. – 290 с.; 22 см
- Древс, Артур. Миф о деве Марии / Проф. А. Древс; Пер. с нем. Н. Румянцева. – [Москва] : Атеист, [1926]. – 106 с.; 25 см.

=== As an editor ===
- Глоба-Михайленко, Надежда Васильевна. Религия и церковь в СССР : [Пояснит. брошюра к серии кинопленочных диапозитивов] / Н. В. Глоба-Михайленко; Под ред. Н. Румянцева (ЦСВ безбожника). – Москва : Союзкино, 1931 (Тамбов : тип. "Пролетарский светоч"). – 32 с.; 13x9 см.
