= USSR anti-religious campaign (1921–1928) =

Campaign of anti-religious persecution

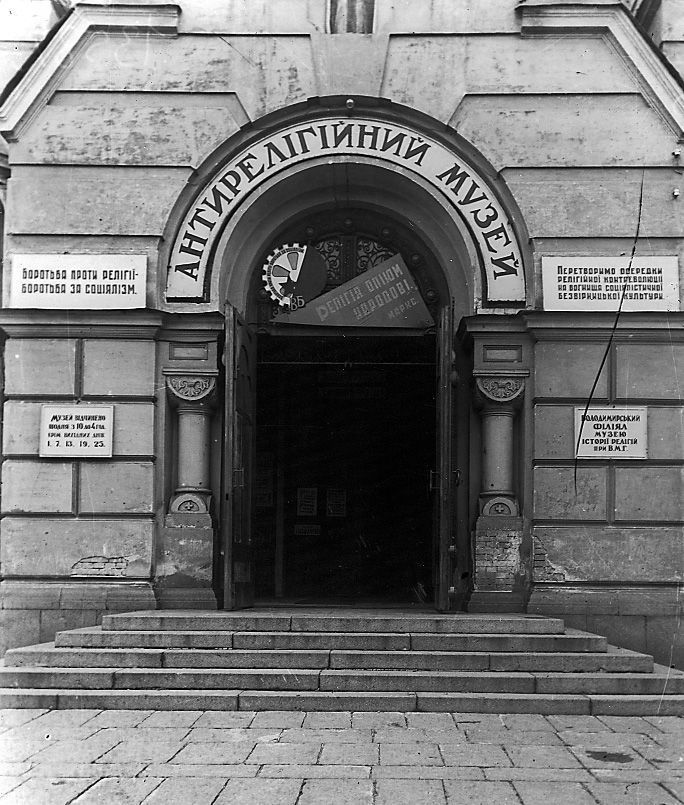
In the late 1920s, St Volodymyr's Cathedral in Kyiv was used as an anti-religious museum.

The USSR anti-religious campaign (1921–1928) was a campaign of anti-religious persecution against churches and Christian believers by the Soviet government following the initial anti-religious campaign during the Russian Civil War. The elimination of all religion and its replacement with scientific materialism was a fundamental ideological goal of the state. To this end, the state began offering secular education to believers, intending to reduce the prevalence of superstition. It was never made illegal to be a believer or to follow a religion, and so the activities of this campaign were often veiled under other pretexts, usually resistance to the regime, that the state invoked or invented in order to justify its activities.

== History ==
The persecution entered a new phase in 1921 with the resolutions adopted by the tenth Communist Party of the Soviet Union congress, and would set the atmosphere for the remainder of the decade, which would enter another new phase in 1929, when new legislation was passed, prohibiting public religious activities.

The 10th Party Congress launched Lenin's "New Economic Policy" (NEP) in response to the poor state of the Soviet economy that resulted from World War I, the Russian Civil War, and the War Communist system used during the latter. The state faced large-scale popular revolts of workers, which Leon Trotsky believed threatened the survival of the state. The NEP introduced a measure of limited free enterprise, aiming to compromise with the general population, as well as to present the new regime in a more respectable light to the world, and thus acquire a place on the world market. The regime considered it detrimental to its reputation to continue with the civil war policy of murdering religious believers without trial or plausible accusations.

Therefore, the anti-religious campaign needed to be conducted under more respectable pretexts. However, the elimination of religion remained a fundamental goal.

There were two main principal anti-religious campaigns in the 1920s, one alongside the campaign to seize church valuables and the other surrounding the renovationist schism in the Orthodox Church.

This portion of the state's anti-religious campaign came to an end in 1929, when Joseph Stalin began the implementation of a much harsher campaign that would take place in the following decade.

== Legislative measures ==
The 10th Party Congress met in early 1921 and issued the resolution "On Glavpolitprosvet (Central Committee of the Republic for Political Education) and the Agitation: Propaganda Problems of the Party". This resolution called for "widescale organization, leadership, and cooperation in the task of anti-religious agitation and propaganda among the broad masses of the workers, using the mass media, films, books, lectures, and other devices.

In August of that year, a plenary meeting of the Central Committee adopted an 11-point instruction on the interpretation and application of Article 13 (mentioned above). The instruction differed between educated believers and uneducated believers, and forbade party membership to any believer who was a member of the clergy, or who had an education, but uneducated believers were allowed party membership on an individual basis, if they proved their devotion to Communism. Such members, however, should be enrolled in 'special re-education work' in order to make them atheists. The instruction warned against rash actions in anti-religious propaganda, against giving too much publicity to 'anti-religious agitation' and it stressed 'serious scientific cultural-enlightenment work, building up natural-scientific foundation for a proper historical analysis of the question of religion'. This meant that the anti-religious campaign was to be directed at building up a non-religious culture and educational system, rather than subjecting religion to ridicule and attack. It directed the Central Committee Agitation Department, Revolution and the Church, and Glavpolitprosvet to conform to this. The instruction also emphasized that the state was fighting against all forms of religious belief and not simply individual religions.

After the 10th congress, authorities began to take measures against public debates, which were eventually formally suspended in 1929 and replaced with public lectures by atheists. The reason given for their cessation was that they did not satisfy public demand and that people preferred to solidify their atheism with study. Vladimir Martsinkovsky was arrested and exiled in 1922, on account of his religious preaching, and told that he could return in a few years, once the workers had become wiser – he was in fact never allowed to return.

== Persecution against the Orthodox Church ==
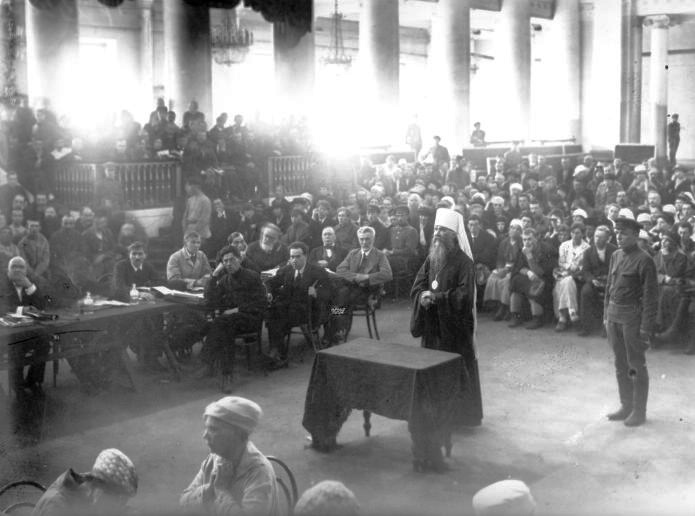
Russian Orthodox metropolitan Benjamin (Kazansky) facing charges by revolutionary tribunal of Petrograd for counter-revolutionary agitation (details)

Despite the August 1921 instruction combating all religions, the state took a particular hard line against the Orthodox church on the pretext that it was a legacy of the Tsarist past. This may also have been a pragmatic consideration in the belief that the state was not yet strong enough in order to broaden its anti-religious activities beyond the Orthodox church.

When church leaders demanded freedom of religion under the constitution, the Communists responded with terror. The metropolitan of Kiev, Vladimir Bogoyavlensky, was executed on 7 February 1918. In 1922, approximately 8000 Orthodox Christians were killed. Repression cowed most ecclesiastical leaders into submission.

Patriarch Tikhon of Moscow produced an encyclical on political neutrality and disengagement of the Church from worldly politics, and the official propaganda depicted it as a form of camouflage to hide his real aim: support for the autocratic bourgeois-aristocracy. Tikhon emphasized the freedom of the Church in the separation of Church and State and the duty of believers to be loyal to the state in civic matters, in as much as this did not contradict a Christian's primary loyalty to God. He produced three declarations of loyalty to the Soviet state, in 1919, 1923 and in his last testament in 1925.

Beginning in March 1922, the Soviet Press published libelous accounts of the behavior of clergy and believers. This was followed up with arrests and trials of the people attacked.

Believers could also be arrested for claiming or honoring miracles. Miracles needed to be suppressed in the eyes of the state due to their contradiction of the atheism of the official state ideology. However, it was not yet legal to prosecute people simply for making such claims, as it would become so in 1929, so miracle claims were prosecuted under the pretext that they were acts of resistance meant to strengthen believers in their resistance to hold on to church valuables. In Tula, the local bishop Yuvenalii was sentenced to ten years' imprisonment after the local populace claimed a miracle had occurred; several others were imprisoned along with him.

Faith had to be turned into a private affair and made as invisible as possible. The regime could not tolerate dynamic faith or popular religious leaders who could inspire and lead millions of people. To this effect, Lenin's doctrine that the state should be much more tolerant towards amoral or even criminal priests, rather than those of good moral standing, was interpreted such that popular clergymen were removed, imprisoned or killed wherever it was deemed feasible. Charges would often be invented against such popular clergy in order to justify their arrest, imprisonment or execution. This method was especially harsh in rural areas, away from foreign observers, where a systematic campaign liquidated the most popular monks and shut down the most authoritative monasteries. The famous Optina monastery was shut down in 1922 and turned into a state museum, and one of the elders was arrested. All seven local churches were shut down as well by 1929, leaving the local religious population with no building to worship in. The museum would later be closed in 1928, and by 1930 the monks who had served in it were mostly either in hiding or had been sent to gulags.

Secret Monasticism began to develop in the 1920s in response to state persecution. This practice involved either people who lived 'in the world' who undertook monastic vows secretly and lived a double-life with other secret monks or nuns, or it involved communities of monastics who lived in secret and isolated from society. When such communities were discovered, the monastics could sometimes be immediately executed. Future church leaders lived in these communities and they may have been instrumental in preserving monasticism in the USSR.

Tikhon died in 1925. He was replaced in 1927 by Metropolitan Sergii, who gave unqualified loyalty to the state. The Church, however, continued to teach that Orthodoxy was incompatible with Marxism. This was contrasted by many other religious groups in the country that tried to reaffirm their compatibility with the state ideology when they were put under attack.

The Orthodox church lost its ability to train new clergy in 1928, after its college of advanced theological studies in Leningrad "voluntarily closed".

== Campaign to seize church valuables ==
The Volga basin is subject to periodic droughts that can sometimes last several years. The last famine produced by a drought occurred in 1891, after which the Tsarist government had built up special stockpiles of grain in preparation for a future famine. However, all of these stockpiles had been taken and used by armed factions in the Civil War, and new droughts in the Volga between 1920 and 1922 resulted in a massive famine. Patriarch Tikhon made an appeal to the world and religious leaders outside of Russia for aid. The Church formed a Famine Relief Committee, which was shut down by the government a few months after it had been created, and all the money collected had to be handed over.

Lenin ordered that all of the precious metals, stones and valuables that could be found in religious buildings throughout the country should be confiscated and sold to raise funds to help relieve the famine. The Patriarch appealed to the parishes on February 19, 1922, to surrender all such objects of value, with the exception of the vessels used for the Eucharist. On February 28, the government issued another order to all state agents to confiscate all sacred vessels, including those used in the sacraments. On the same day, the Patriarch issued an encyclical asking believers to be very generous in their donations so as to pay off the cost of the vessels used in the Eucharist, but not to give up the vessels themselves.

Lenin seized the opportunity and used it as a pretext to attack the church. He refused the Patriarch's compromise of offering the monetary value of the vessels and insisted that the vessels be handed over. Lenin also refused the Patriarch's request that Church representatives be included in the government commissions inspecting, confiscating and accounting for the confiscated valuables.

The Patriarch distrusted the government and maintained his order not to hand over the vessels. The state went ahead and sent armed requisitioning teams around the country to collect the valuables, provoking much resistance.

The sixth sector of the OGPU, led by Yevgeny Tuchkov, began aggressively arresting and executing bishops, priests, and devout worshipers, such as Metropolitan Veniamin in Petrograd in 1922, for refusing to accede to the demand to hand in church valuables. Archbishop Andronik of Perm, who worked as a missionary in Japan, was shot after being forced to dig his own grave. Bishop Germogen of Tobolsk, who voluntarily accompanied the Tsar into exile, was strapped to the paddlewheel of a steamboat and mangled by the rotating blades.

By mid-1922, there had been 1414 violent clashes between the faithful and the armed detachments, as well as 55 trials and 231 group cases. Tikhon appeared as a witness to the trial of 54 clergy, and he took personal responsibility for their actions. Twelve of the fifty-four were executed, and 27 received prison sentences. At least 35 Orthodox were legally sentenced to death in connection with this campaign although some sentences were commuted.

One of the bloodiest of the clashes occurred in an old textile industrial town called Shuia, near Moscow. On March 15, 1922, a group of mounted police arrived at the church square to requisition the valuables and a large crowd of believers had gathered there as well. The Soviet press reported that the mounted police were greeted with threatening shouts and the hurling of rocks or other articles, while someone rang an alarm bell that brought huge masses of people to the square.

A half-company of infantry was then brought, supported by two armored cars with mounted machine guns. The Soviet press reported that believers fired the first shots with pistols at the soldiers, who then returned fire.

After the event, Lenin wrote that their enemies had foolishly afforded them a great opportunity, since he believed that the peasant masses would not support the church's hold on its valuables in light of the famine and that the resistance that the church offered could be met with bloody retaliation against the clergy, without inciting popular sympathy:

At the party congress, arrange a secret meeting of all or almost all delegates to discuss this matter jointly with the chief workers of the GPU, the People's Commissariat of Justice [NKIu], and the Revolutionary Tribunal. At this meeting, pass a secret resolution of the congress that the removal of property of value, especially from the very richest lauras, monasteries, and churches, must be carried out with ruthless resolution, leaving nothing in doubt, and in the very shortest time. The greater the number of representatives of the reactionary clergy and the reactionary bourgeoisie that we succeed in shooting on this occasion, the better because this "audience" must precisely now be taught a lesson in such a way that they will not dare to think about any resistance whatsoever for several decades.

In this same letter, secret at the time, Lenin explained that the campaign to seize church valuables was not for primarily philanthropic reasons, but rather as a means of provoking the church into a situation wherein it could be attacked with little reprisal and depicted as a heartless organization that would not give up its gold to feed the starving poor. This fact may have also explained his shutting down of the Church's famine relief efforts and his refusal to compromise. It also likely affected the misrepresentation of the Church's position in the Soviet press, where it was not acknowledged that the Patriarch had offered to arrange to pay for the valuables and the Church hierarchy was presented as careless about the catastrophe.

Several trials and executions of clergy followed the Shuia incident.

The campaign targeted not only the Orthodox church, but also seized valuables present in religious buildings of other religions. Trials were conducted of Roman Catholics and Jews who resisted the seizure, but they generally received much milder sentences than the Orthodox.

The valuables collected proved to be of pitiful value on the world market, as it was even discovered that the Russian nobility had for centuries been donating fake precious stones, but Lenin's propaganda effect was still achieved.

With the conclusion of the campaign, the terror against the church was called off for a while. In May 1923, the Anti-religious Commission of the Central Committee ordered the GPU (the State Political Directorate) 'to investigate all closures of churches. If these should have taken place with abuse of the Soviet legislation on the cults, the guilty ones ought to be made responsible for their acts.' The commission sent a letter to the Central Committee, suggesting immediate discontinuation of the closure of churches, and the publication of an article in Pravda condemning such acts. The Central Committee followed with an internal letter to all party organizations on June 23, calling for a halt to all such abuses which 'cause all sorts of dissatisfaction, made use of by anti-Soviet elements.' The physical attack was called off, but the propaganda war continued.

The Soviet press, after the campaign, accused the clergy and laity of hiding or stealing church valuables. Even more arrests and imprisonments followed these accusations. This, however, was cut short by the failure of the state to conceal the embarrassing, massive, black-market operations by Soviet officials, who were caught stealing and selling the valuables for themselves. This news resulted in rioting by believers.

In total, it is estimated that 8,100 clergy, monks, and nuns were murdered in connection with the church-valuables campaign. Another 165 priests were executed after 1923.

== Renovationist Schism ==
The state supported a schism in the Orthodox church called the 'Renovationist' sect or the 'Living Church', led by Alexander Vvendenskij, giving it legal recognition in 1922 and continuing to terrorize the old Orthodox, as well as depriving the old Orthodox of legal means of existence. The Renovationists attempted to make Orthodox Christianity compatible with Marxism and were fully loyal to the state.

The state initially recognized only the schismatic group as the legitimate church and subsequently persecuted those who refused to recognize the schism.

Trotsky wanted Patriarch Tikhon killed after the excommunication of 1918, but Lenin forbade it. Lenin also insisted on protecting the Patriarch during the Shuia incident, fearing that it would produce another Germogen, a Patriarch killed by the Poles when they occupied Moscow in 1612. The Patriarch was arrested in May 1922, and his chancery was taken over by the Renovationists. Trotsky would continue to attack the Patriarch until he was released from prison in 1923 and made his declaration of loyalty.

The state arrested, exiled and even shot clergy who continued to declare their loyalty to Tikhon after his arrest and resisted the takeover by the Renovationists. The state issued propaganda, which claimed that opposition to the takeover was the result of 'bourgeois and black-hundrist elements'.

Metropolitan Veniamin (Kazansky) of Petrograd was one of the most prominent victims of this. He was very popular and had come from a lower-class background, which hurt Soviet propaganda that the church hierarchy was filled with representatives of the upper classes during the time of the Tsar. The Petrograd section of the State Famine Relief Commission initially agreed to a plan proposed by Veniamin to hand over valuables, and to include representatives of the Church in the confiscations. The Petrograd section may not have been initially informed by Lenin of the real aim of the campaign, because shortly after this agreement was published in newspapers in approving terms, the section cancelled the agreement and stated that the clergy could not participate in the commission. The Metropolitan agreed to hand over the valuables and pay for the precious objects used in the sacraments through a special collection, and the Petrograd section agreed to this.

The peace was short-lived, however, because the Metropolitan protested the takeover of the church by the Renovationists and excommunicated its leaders. The Soviet press responded by attacking Veniamin's character and he was presented with an ultimatum by the government that he could either remove the excommunication, or he, and those close to him would pay with their lives. The Metropolitan would not change, and so he was arrested shortly after.

He was defended by a Jew named Gurovich and the trial was conducted in a courtroom packed with thousands of people. Gurovich conducted an excellent defense; he cleverly mentioned how Krasnitsky had been publishing militantly anti-Bolshevik articles up until November 1917, and as a Jew, he defended the record of the Russian clergy in a pre-revolutionary incident where there had been an allegation of Jewish ritual murder. When no evidence could be found for the charges against him about belonging to a counter-revolutionary conspiracy, the Petrograd Cheka chief PA Krasikov famously stated:

Are you inquiring about the real existence of criminal conspiracy? Look here it is! Right in front of you! This organization is the Orthodox Church itself!

In his final plea to the court, Veniamin declared his loyalty to the state and recalled the words of St Paul 'if you suffer because you are a Christian, don't be ashamed of it but thank God'. At the conclusion of the trial, ten people, including the Metropolitan, were condemned to death, and 59 others received prison sentences. Veniamin was executed by firing squad on August 12.

In 1925, there were at least 65 bishops in prison or exile, not counting those who had been detained for short periods and then released. Some bishops returned in 1925, while an additional twenty bishops were arrested the same year, including Metropolitan Peter, who became temporary Patriarch after Tikhon's death in April 1925. The regime continued to arrest clergy who did not accept the Renovationists. Peter's replacement as temporary Patriarch after his arrest was Metropolitan Sergii. He and twelve bishops, including Archbishop Illarion of Krutitsy, were arrested in 1926. The intransigence of some of the bishops would cause them to remain and eventually die in exile; Metropolitan Peter died in the Arctic in 1937 and Illarion died in a prison hospital in Leningrad in 1929.

In 1926–1927, the bishops secretly elected new patriarch by means of a correspondence ballot carried by trusted messengers going from one bishop to another. The state discovered this ballot through the arrest and execution of two of the messengers, and arrested many of the bishops who were participating, as well as another messenger. The number of arrested bishops rose to 150 by mid-1927 as a result of this.

Sergii was released in 1927 and became the new Patriarch, after he signed a declaration of loyalty to the state. The new declaration of loyalty not only promised loyalty to the government, but claimed that the Soviets had never mistreated the Church and thanked the government for the care that had been shown to believers. This declaration may at first not have been widely known, because arrests continued briefly.

Once it had been widely published, another schism developed in the Church, with many conservative church movements refusing to accept this new declaration. At least 37 bishops broke with Sergii over this issue. The group that broke with the new Patriarch was not deeply opposed to Sergii's civic loyalty to the state, but they could not accept the declaration he signed that stated that there had never been any religious persecutions, which they saw as a betrayal of the martyrs.

The clergy who had been arrested for originally declaring their loyalty to Sergii before 1927 remained in prison, while clergy who refused to accept his authority after 1927 began to be arrested by the state.

The Renovationists failed to attract the laity, who largely remained with the Patriarchal church and produced a firestorm of opposition to their temporary takeover of the Russian Orthodox church. For this reason, the state lost interest in the Renovationists. The Renovationists lost control of a third to one-half of their churches by the end of 1924. The authorities changed direction and pushed for reunification in 1924–1927 in the belief that the Renovationists, who were loyal to the state, could be used as agents, activists and informers within the Patriarchal Orthodox church.

== Anti-religious propaganda ==
Anti-religious propaganda played a critical role in the persecutions, because it were used to develop attitudes of hostility against believers, which could then lead to justifying their mistreatment.

A number of specialized anti-religious journals began circulation in 1922. Nauka i religiia (Science and Religion), edited by former priest Mikhail Galkin (literary pseudonym: Gorev), began in December 1922, and was soon replaced by the weekly Bezbozhnik (The Godless), edited by Yemelyan Yaroslavsky. Yaroslavsky would form a society of "Friends of The Godless newspaper", which a few years later would become the Society of the Godless and eventually the League of the Militant Godless.

In 1922, the 11th Party Congress turned the publishing house Glavpolitprosvet, Krasnaia nov and the journal by the same name into a special party publishing enterprise for Marxist and anti-religious literature. The 12th (1923) and 13th (1924) Party Congresses called for 'moderation'. The 12th Party Congress called for the expansion of anti-religious propaganda and warned against insulting religious feelings by 'primitive methods' and against ridiculing objects and ceremonies of faith, claiming that these methods strengthen 'religious fanaticism'. Instead, it called for more anti-religious literature of a popular scientific nature, and more analysis of the history of religion. The call for moderation was ignored by the anti-religious journals.

The propaganda viciously attacked the Orthodox Church and especially its clergy as being the scum of the nation. It was claimed in the official press that none of the seminarians believed in their religion's teachings, but that these teachings were simply tools to exploit the masses. The early anti-church propaganda produced by the Soviet state claimed that the state was only opposed to the leadership of the Orthodox Church, and not religion in general, or the Orthodox Church as a body. To this effect, the press commended acts of disobedience by parishes against the Patriarch; in 1920, there was one parish that was commended for refusing to accept priests that were sent by the church hierarchy and which opted instead to elect a former psalmist as their priest.

The Patriarch was attacked in the press, especially during the campaign to seize church valuables, as having sold Jesus to the Tsar and capitalists by withholding church valuables from the famine-stricken. The church hierarchy was presented in the official press as indifferent to the suffering of the famine and happy about the economic catastrophe, as a means that could contribute towards overthrowing the Soviets and returning the monarchy.

Anti-religious propaganda of the time also blamed Christianity, and especially the Orthodox Church, for fomenting anti-semitism. In an apparent contradiction, the anti-religious propaganda also depicted Jews in an anti-semitic light as capitalist businessmen in accordance with Marx's writing.

The anti-religious press continuously produced primitive blasphemies of God, Christ and the Saints. Religion was equated with immorality, drunkenness and money-grabbing. Religion was blamed for failing to differentiate between the working classes and capitalists. The anti-religious propaganda rarely differed in methodology, despite the debate that went on between different members of the Soviet hierarchy. Even 'sophisticated' theoretical and methodological journals often published direct hate propaganda against religious believers.

In 1924, the sophisticated 'Society of Militant Materialists' (renamed in 1928 'Militant Dialectical Materialists') was founded, and it consisted predominately—exclusively after 1928—of Marxist philosophers grouped around Under the Banner of Marxism, aimed at combating religious and 'idealistic' views among scientists, scholars and intellectuals in general.

== Debate on Methodology ==
As the years progressed, it became increasingly clear that the old Marxist assumption that religion would die away quickly and easily was mistaken, as resistance to the anti-religious policies was found across the country. In 1924, Trotsky, who originally had thought that the Russian masses were only superficially religious, warned that the struggle against religion would be a long and arduous and spoke of religion as a cultural phenomenon to be attacked on all fronts and with every means, except the forced closure of churches.

Trotsky considered printed anti-religious material to be of little use in a largely illiterate nation and he emphasized the potential of the cinema in being able to replace the religiosity of the peasantry, which he thought was only a matter of habit in absence of other entertainment.

Different parts of the Soviet leadership disagreed on how best to combat religion, with positions ranging from the 'rightist' belief that religion would die on its own naturally with increasing education, and the 'leftist' belief that religion needed to be attacked strongly. The Marxist notion that human beliefs were determined by material conditions had been used to support the 'rightist' argument that religion would go away on its own once the state developed, and that rather than teaching people atheism and giving anti-religious propaganda, people should instead be taught natural sciences and they would then lose their religion. The old Marxist theory was pragmatically questioned as it became apparent that religion was not going away, and more active means were thought necessary.

The debate was not about whether or not religion was evil, but about what tactics to use to combat it. The deputy editor of Bezhbozhnik Anton Loginov explained:

It's common knowledge that religion is opium... poison, stupor, moonshine, and yet we are not supposed to insult believers' feelings. Why should we say one thing and do another?... Not every stab at religion serves the aim of struggle against it… every "persecution of that faith" builds up religious fanaticism.

To this effect, anti-religious activities that were too insulting to religious feelings could be questioned and criticized in the belief that they would harden religious convictions.

Lenin's statement 'On the Significance of Militant Materialism', was worded in such a fashion that both sides of the debate would use it to support their arguments. Lenin's statement called for a close cooperation of all militant materialists, both communists and non-communists, including the 18th-century French materialists, and it also stressed the role of the official Marxist philosophical monthly journal Under the Banner of Marxism (Pod znamenem marxizma) to tirelessly disseminate 'atheistic propaganda and struggle', which he called 'the cause of our state' (nasha gosudartsvennaia rabota).

An important part of this debate occurred between Emelian Yaroslavskym, founder of the Society of the Godless, and the Moscow Society of the Godless. Yaroslavsky's position that the whole nation needed to be mobilized for an attack on all religions, but one which was pragmatically organized and moderated to be effective, would eventually carry official favour and become the officially adopted position for the anti-religious campaign after 1929.

A unified consolidated position on the religious question nevertheless took shape in these years.

== Education ==
The school question initially proved troublesome for Soviet policies. They had outlawed religious instruction for schoolchildren or youth. In 1925, the delegates of the first congress of Soviet schoolteachers refused to endorse the principle of separation of church and state, and sought to retain religious teaching in school. The majority of school-teachers, as well as much of the population, were reportedly still religious believers in the 1920s. Anatoly Lunacharsky, the Commissar of Enlightenment, was forced to accept non-religious, rather than anti-religious, education, due to the shortage of atheist teachers and the fear that such a system would provoke a hostile reaction by the religious masses. Anti-religious education was still seen as an important goal, and beginning in 1925, anti-religious education was introduced to secondary schools, mainly through classes on culture, in addition to setting up branches of the League of the Godless in schools.

== Revisal of Renovationist Policy and Policies to Non-Orthodox Religions ==
In 1927, the state officially recognized both churches and there were signs that the government saw the Renovationists as a threat to their regime. Renovationists began to be attacked in the official press as a cunning group that was trying to be friends with the state in order to increase religion.

The press also attacked Jewish and Muslim reformism at the same time. Reformism in religion and cooperation with the state began to be seen as even more dangerous to the system than the traditional religions, because they were able to make religion appear less dangerous than it was.

The attack on the Orthodox became more generally an attack against all religions around 1927. Sects that had originally been praised in the official press for their loyalty and hard work, despite their religious convictions that were problematic to implementing Communism, began to be demonized in the late 1920s. Even when these other religions tried to reaffirm their compatibility with Marxism and their loyalty to the state, this was rejected in the official propaganda that increasingly depicted all religious activity as harmful and in contradiction with Communism.

The non-hierarchical nature of some of these sects made them appear even more dangerous to the state, since they could not be as easily controlled as the Orthodox Church that worked according to a strict hierarchy. Finnish Protestants began to be attacked in 1927. Mennonite communities left the USSR in large numbers as a result of the hostility against them; 13000 fled in 1928. The Dukhobors had been relatively untouched by direct anti-religious activities until 1927. Adventists had originally been very hostile to the new regime until 1924, when their leadership declared loyalty to the communist state.

The change in policy may have reflected both a growing confidence in the state's capacity to persecute religion, such that it now felt safe to broaden the campaign, and it may also have been a result of the growing influence of the Society of the Godless.

The need to attack some of these sects may also have been produced from a need to justify the liquidation of the religious farm communes, and the fact that some of these communities were filling the void left by the Orthodox church after it was attacked and many parishes were closed.

== Ukrainian Church ==
The Soviets initially supported a Ukrainian nationalistic church movement called the Autocephalists, which broke with Tikhon under the leadership of Metropolitan Lypinski. The Soviets supported this split for the same reasons that they supported the Renovationists, in that they wanted to weaken the Patriarchal Church.

Beginning as early as 1919, Ukrainian clergy who remained faithful to Tikhon suffered mass reprisals. Autocephalist complicity may have contributed to the killing of Patriarchal Metropolitan Vladimir in Kiev in 1918.

The Autocephalists encountered the same problem as the Renovationists in that they failed to attract the Ukrainian laity. As a result, the Soviets lost interest in them, and began persecuting them in 1924. This persecution became especially harsh in the latter part of the decade, once the state began to take manoeuvres to destroy nationalist movements. The leader of the Autocephalists was imprisoned in 1926, and the church was forced to declare its self-liquidation in 1930. Almost all of its bishops, and most clerical and lay activists, were incarcerated and many executed.

== Policies towards Muslims ==
Lenin and Stalin in their earlier writings had professed a desire to eliminate Islam, while recognizing the importance of using Muslim support for their cause.

After the revolution, Lenin had promised national autonomy and religious freedom for Muslims. Muslim reformists had emphasized women's role in the mosque. Sultan Galiev had claimed that Islam had stronger 'civic-political motives' than other faiths and should be treated more cautiously by the communists, and that there should be very limited propaganda against them, with no direct attacks.

The People's Commisariat for Muslim Affairs was established in 1918 under the administration of mullah Nur-Vakhitov, the only clerical person to ever occupy a state office in Soviet History. Both Muslims and Protestants enjoyed relative tolerance until 1928–1929 and were allowed activities banned for the Orthodox church. The Soviets offered Muslims free public education on a massive scale, which had not been available under the Tsars. Through this, the region of Central Asia, which had formerly been one of the least educated areas of the Russian empire, would become comparable to the rest of the country. The underdeveloped region was also industrialized at an impressive rate.

The Baku Muslim clergy in 1923 praised the Soviet regime for having saved Persia and Turkey from 'predatory England'.

Sultan Galiev was the leader of a group of Central Asian Marxists that attempted to reform Islam in order to modernize it as well as to support atheism in the Central Asian states. He was allied with Lenin, who used him as an intermediary between the government and the peoples of Central Asia. Galiev had controversial ideas within the communist party about creating an autonomous communist state in the Muslim areas of Central Asia that would be called Turkestan. The party reacted against this idea of a unified and autonomous Muslim state by choosing to divide Central Asia into different republics in 1924: Kazakhstan, Turkmenistan, Tajikistan, Kyrgyzstan and Uzbekistan.

By the mid-1920s, Islamic courts became irrelevant, and they were replaced by Soviet courts. Islamic courts were rapidly eliminated and Islamic studies were removed from education, along with other religious teaching throughout the country. About 8000 Islamic schools existed in Central Asia prior to the revolution, and by 1928, all of them had been shut down. The language and alphabet reforms also cut off the people of Central Asia from Arabic literature.

Galiev's ideas would be attacked in the late 1920s and the anti-religious campaign would reject any policy of special treatment for Islam, and would attack it alongside the other religions.

== Activities of Public Institutions ==
The Komsomol and later LMG would try to implement the 10th congress resolution with various attacks, parades, theatrical performances, journals, brochures and films. The Komsomol would hold crude blasphemous 'Komsomol Christmases' and 'Komsomol Easters' headed by hooligans dressed as orthodox clergy. The processions would include the burning of icons, religious books, mock images of Christ, the Virgin, and so on.

For example, in one Christmas play on December 25, 1923, in the city of Gomel, the Komsomol actors presented a performance of a mock trial of deities in a city theatre; the defendants were stuffed scarecrows, representing the deities of different religions as well as their clergy. The judges were proletarian Komsomol, and handed down the verdict that all deities and clergy must be burned at the stake. The whole mass then poured out into the streets with torches and scarecrows in their hands, saying 'Away with the churches, away with the synagogues!' The effigies were then publicly burned in the city square.

They often organized their parades at the same time as the celebration of religious holidays, such as Christmas and Easter, and placed them right outside churches that were holding services. This often prevented traditional Orthodox processions from occurring at the same time. Appeals were made to bakeries not to bake traditional foods for these feast days.

The propaganda campaign, however, was a failure and many people remained with their religious convictions. The church held its own public events with some success, and well competed with the anti-religious propaganda during these years. In the few instances that numbers were reported, it was stated that more people attended churches than had come to participate in the anti-religious parades. These tactics of the Komsomol were discarded in the mid-1920s, as being too crude and offensive to believers' feelings, but they were later revived in the late 1920s and early 1930s. They were replaced in the mid-1920s by meetings behind closed doors, accompanied by anti-religious lectures, poetry readings as well as articles in atheistic journals.

Special conferences on anti-religious propaganda under the auspices of the Central Committee Agitation-Propaganda Department worked out directives that were implemented on either the local party level or through a public institution from 1926 on.

A huge volume of anti-religious articles in Pravda and Komsomol'skaia Pravda was published between 1928 and 1929.

== Foreign relations ==
The British government issued strong verbal rebukes of the Soviet Union for the campaign, which the Soviets responded to by uncompromisingly defensive reactions that narrowed the scope of diplomatic efforts.

The Vatican at first sought to use the newly re-created Poland's position to promote Catholic interests in Russia, but following the war between the Bolsheviks and Poland, the Vatican turned to Weimar Germany, which played a crucial role in diplomatic efforts with regard to Christians in the USSR.

In 1922, at the Conference of Genoa, where the Soviet Union's relations with foreign states were negotiated, the Vatican demanded that Russia grant complete freedom of conscience to its citizens. The Soviet government instead pursued a policy of demanding that the Vatican grant it recognition without a concordat or any conditions, and held out the prospect that doing so could result in priests being released from prison.

The Vatican raised a massive aid campaign for famine relief, and the Soviet government permitted the Vatican to send its help, under the condition that it did not engage in any proselytization and that the priests who would come would be dressed and made to appear as though they were secular relief workers. The Vatican's mission went ahead and delivered food as well as medicine. The American government gave material support to the Vatican's mission.

This mission was cancelled by the Soviet government in 1924, after a breakdown in relations, caused by demands on the Vatican from the Soviet side that have been described as "ridiculous", and sharp conflicts arising between the Catholics and the militant atheists.

== See also ==
- Persecution of Christians in the Soviet Union
- Persecution of Christians in Warsaw Pact countries
- USSR anti-religious campaign (1917–1921)
- USSR anti-religious campaign (1928–1941)
- USSR anti-religious campaign (1958–1964)
- USSR anti-religious campaign (1970s–1990)
