= Semyon Kamenev =

Soviet educator, professor, writer, and propagandist of atheism (1895–1938)

Semyon Alekseyevich Kamenev (Russian: Семён Алексеевич Каменев; 1895 – 14 March 1938) was an educator, professor, writer, and Soviet propagandist of atheism.

Semyon Kamenev was born in the village of Semyonovka, Kursk Uyezd, Kursk Governorate. He received a higher education. He worked as a research fellow at the Central Research Institute of Elementary School. He was a member of the editorial board of Ateist, an anti-theistic monthly journal. Kamenev was a member of the RCP(b). He lived in Moscow at 2 Gagarinsky Lane, apartment 2.

During the Great Purge, on 17 December 1937, Kamenev was arrested and accused by the Military Collegium of the Supreme Court of the Soviet Union of participating in an anti-Soviet organization. On 14 March 1938, Kamenev was shot at the Kommunarka shooting ground in Moscow Oblast. Following de-stalinization, on 12 May 1956, the Military Collegium of the Supreme Court of the Soviet Union rehabilitated him.

== Work ==
In Russian

- «Советская трудовая школа» (Soviet Labor School)/ С. А. Каменев. - Ростов н/Д : Севкавкнига, 1925. - [8], 372 с.;
- «Школа и организация детской среды» (School and Organization of the Children's Environment): С прил. схем и указателя литературы / С. А. Каменев. - Ростов н/Д : Буревестник, 1925. - 55 с. : схем.;
- «Товарищи» (Comrades) : Первая рабочая книга после букваря... / С. А. Каменев, М. Б. Темкин. - Ростов н/Д : Севкавкнига, 1927 (1-я госуд. тип. Донполиграфбума). - 148, III : ил.; 26х17 см. - (Учебники и учебные пособия для школ Северного Кавказа).
- «Л. Н. Толстой, как педагог» (L. N. Tolstoy, as a Teacher) : Речь на публичном заседании Науч.-педагог. о-ва при Сев.-Кав. гос. ун-те по случаю 100-летия со дня рождения Л. Н. Толстого (1828-1928 гг.) / С. А. Каменев. - Ростов н/Д : [б. и.], 1928. - 17 с.;
- «Церковь и просвещение в России» (Church and Enlightenment in Russia): (Очерки). - Москва : науч. общество Атеист, 1928 (Сергиев : тип. "Шестой октябрь"). - 140 с.,
  - «Церковь и просвещение в России» (Church and Enlightenment in Russia) / С. А. Каменев. - 2-е изд., испр. и доп. - [Москва] : Атеист, [1929] (Л. : госуд. тип. им. Евг. Соколовой). - 162 с. : схем.;
  - «Церковь и просвещение в России» (Church and Enlightenment in Russia) / С. А. Каменев. - 3-е изд., испр. и доп. - Москва : Безбожник, 1930 (Рязань : Рязтип. "Мосполиграфа"). - 202 с. : ил.;
- «Будь готов!» (Be Prepared!) : Первая рабоч. книга после букваря... / Каменев С. А., Темкин М. Б. - Ростов н/Д : Северный Кавказ, 1930 (гостип. им. Коминтерна Севкавкрайполиграфобъединения). - 152 с. : ил., портр.; 25х18 см. - (Учебники и учебные пособия для школ Северного Кавказа).
- «Социалистическое соревнование как метод воспитания» (Socialist Emulation as a Method of Education) / С. А. Каменев. - Москва : Работник просвещения, 1930. - 95 с.; 21 см. - (Вопросы марксистской педагогики/ Под ред. С. Фридмана)
- «Против методического прожектерства» (Against Methodological Projection) / С. А. Каменев. - Москва; Ленинград : Гос. учеб.-педагог. изд-во, 1932 (М. : тип. "Образцовая"). - 40 с.; 20х13 см. - (Библиотечка "Решение ЦК ВКП(б) о начальной и средней школе в действии").
- «О работе классного руководителя» (About the Work of the Class Teacher) : Стенограмма доклада проф. С. А. Каменева на собрании учителей г. Москвы, организованного ВКИПом 10/ V 35 / Центр. науч.-иссл. ин-т педагогики при ВКИПе. - [Москва] : [б. и.], [1935]. - 21 с.;
- «Педологическая лженаука в "трудах" Басова» (Pedological Pseudoscience in the "Works" of Basov) / С. А. Каменев. - Москва : Гос. учеб.-педагог. изд., 1937 (шк. ФЗУ треста "Полиграфкнига"). - Обл., 32 с.;
- Материалы Первого краевого съезда районных инспекторов соцвоса Северо-Кавказского края [3-9 февраля 1926 г.] / Под общ. ред. С. А. Каменева; Сев.-Кав. краев. отд. нар. образования. Крайсоцвос. - Ростов н/Д : С.-К. крайоно, 1926. - 93 с.;
- Избранные педагогические высказывания / Н. А. Добролюбов; С вводной статьей и примеч. С. А. Каменева; Под общ. ред. М. П. Орахелашвили, А. П. Пинкевича и др. - Москва : Гос. учеб. педагог. изд-во, 1936. - 387 с. фронт.; 22 см. - (Педагогическая библиотека).
- Избранные педагогические высказывания / Н. Г. Чернышевский; С вводной статьей и прим. С. А. Каменева; Под общ. ред. М. П. Орахелашвили, А. П. Пинкевича, С. А. Каменева и др. - Москва : Учпедгиз, 1936. - 208 с., 1 л. портр.;
- Хрестоматия по истории педагогики : Для высш. педагог. учеб. заведений / Под общ. ред. С. А. Каменева. - 2-е изд. - Москва : Гос. учеб.-педагог. изд-во, 1935-1938. - 7 т.

In Southern Altai

- Ишмекчи-ле крестьян кижи качанда белен бол! / С. Каменев. - Улалу : Ойрот обл. ВКП(б) обкомы чыгарган, 1927. - 36 с.;
