= Ivan Shpitsberg =

Russian-Soviet lawyer and journalist (1880–1933)

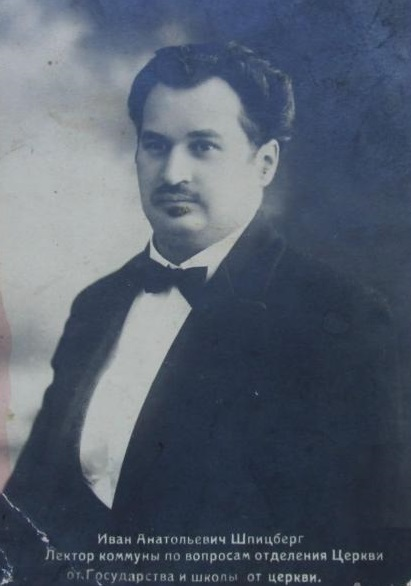
A photograph of Shpitsberg (undated).

Ivan Anatolievich Shpitsberg (Russian: Иван Анатольевич Шпицберг; 1880 — 1933), was a Russian and Soviet lawyer, journalist, writer, translator, organizer, and head of the publishing house Atheist (Russian: "Атеист") (1921), and editor of the eponymous magazine.

== Career ==
Shpitsberg was born into a noble family. He graduated from the Faculty of Law at Saint Petersburg State University in 1906. On 1 September 1906 he became an assistant to a sworn attorney. On 9 June 1912 he became a sworn attorney in St. Petersburg. After February 1917, he worked as an official of the Holy Synod on divorce cases. According to information on 13 March 1917, he was an "employee of the commissariat of the 4 sub-district of the Foundry District" in Petrograd. From January to June 1918, he was "chairman of the Marriage Department of the Foundry District Council" of the Workers' Council and soldiers' deputies, also in Petrograd. Since 1918, he became an anti-religious lecturer-propagandist, and, at the same time, a comrade of the People's Commissar in Petrograd. He joined the ranks of the RCP (b), according to various sources, in May to July 1919.

Shpitsberg also took part in the publication of the anti-religious magazine Revolution and Church. On 17 May 1919 he began working in the VIII department of the People's Commissariat of Justice: first as an expert, and then (no later than May 1920) in its body on the most important cases. From 1 December 1920 to 31 May 1921 he served as the legal adviser of the Cheka. At the same time, he was an authorized officer of the Seventh Division of the Secret Department of the Cheka. Shpitsberg led investigations of church processes from 1918-1920. He was dismissed from the Cheka for defamation on 10 June 1921.

In 1921, he became the organizer and head of the publishing house Atheist (Russian: "Атеист"). Under the guidance of Shpitsberg, a library of atheistic literature of foreign authors was created, and the books were translated by P. Holbach, A. Drews, J. Robertson, G. Daumer, J. Fraser, L. Taxil, and others.

He died of heart disease.

== Works ==
=== Books ===
- Церковники и их агенты пред народным революционным судом / Революция и церковь, 1919. № 6-8; С. 62-76
- Церковники и их агенты перед народным и революционным судом : Дело об антисемитской агитации в Московском соборе Василия Блаженного в связи с обнаружением в нем усыпальницы "мученика Гавриила", / И.Ш. - М. : Нар. ком. юст., 1920. - 16 с.; 25 см. - (Антирелигиоз. б-ка журн. "Революция и церковь"; Вып.5)
- Святой Василий Грязнов: защита подмосковных акул текстильной промышленности / И. Шпицберг. - Москва : Научное о-во Атеист, 1925. - 32 с. : ил.; djvu
  - То же. - 2-е изд; Обложка: В. Тривас. - Москва : Атеист, 1929 (Борисов : тип. Комбината). - 32 с. : ил., портр., факс.;
- Лев Толстой как столп и утверждение поповщины: Противотолстовская хрестоматия / Под ред. И. А. Шпицберга. - 3-е изд., испр. и доп. - [Москва] : Атеист, [1930] (Тверь : гостипо-лит. им. Карла Маркса). - 160 с.;

=== As the author of the preface to the book ===
- Древс, Артур. Жил ли апостол Петр? / Проф. Артур Древс; Пер. и прим. Н. Румянцева; Предисл. И. Шпицберга. - Москва : Атеист, 1924. - VIII, 100 с. : ил.; 26 см
- Древс, Артур. Миф о Христе / Проф. Артур Древс; Пер. с нем. под ред. П. Красикова. - Москва : Атеист, [1924]. - 22 см. Т. 1: Т. 1 / С предисл. И. Шпицберга: "Христос, как динамомашина капитализма". - 1924. - XXIV, 210 с.
- Корвин, Отто. Зеркало папизма / Отто Корвин; пер. с нем. В. Е. Иензена с предисл. И. Шпицберга. - Москва : Атеист, 1924. - 12 с., 320 стлб.; 24 см.

=== Translations ===
- Даенсон, Эдуард. О боге и черте / Пер. с франц. И. А. Шпицберга; Э. Даенсон; Статья Ивана Анатольевича Шпицберга. Религиозная язва. - Петроград : [б. и.], 1919 (тип. Н. Я. Дурнякина). - [2], XXX, 100, III с.; 22 см.
  - Даенсон, Эдуард. О боге и черте : (Памфлет) / Эдуард Даэнсон; Пер. с франц. и прим. И. А. Шпицберга. - Москва : Красная новь, 1923. - IV, 160 с. : ил.; 24 см.
  - Э. Даэнсон. О Боге и черте. (Памфлет). Перевод с французского и примечания И. А. Шпицберга. (с 32 рисунками). Москва. Издательство "Атеист". 1923 г. - V, 160 с.
- Робертсон, Джон. Евангельские мифы / Джон Робертсон; перевод с нем. под ред. и с преисл. И. А. Шпицберга. - Москва : Атеист, 1923. - XIV, 224 с. : ил.
- Олар, Альфонс. Христианство и Французская революция. 1789-1802 / Альфонс Олар; Пер. с франц. под ред. [и с предисл.] И. Шпицберга. - Москва : Атеист, 1925. - 98, [1] с.; 23 см
- Эйльдерман, Генрих. Миф и религия : (первобытная мифология в материалистическом освещении) : сказки австралийских туземцев / Генрих Эйльдерман; пер. с нем. под ред. И. Шпицберга. - Москва : Атеист, 1926. - 72, [2] с. : ил.; 26 см.
- Даумер, Георг Фридрих. Тайны древнего христианства / Г. Даумер; Пер. с немецк. под ред. И. Шпицберга. - [Москва] : науч. о-во Атеист, [1927] ("Мосполиграф" типо-цинкография "Мысль печатника"). - 176 с. : ил.; 26х18 см

=== As an editor ===
- Поливанов, Сергей. Жрец Тарквиний : Трагедия в 3 д. / [Соч.] С. Поливанова Под ред. И. А. Шпицберга и Н. Ф. Аксагарского. - Москва : Атеист, 1922. - 15 с. : ил., нот.; 35 см.
  - Поливанов, Сергей. Жрец Тарквиний : Трагедия в 3 д. / [Соч.] С. Поливанова Под ред. И. А. Шпицберга и Н. Ф. Аксагарского. - 2-е изд. - Москва : Атеист, 1922. - 15 с. : ил., нот.; 35 см.
  - Поливанов, Сергей. Жрец Тарквиний : Трагедия в 3-х д. / С. Поливанов Под. ред. И. А. Шпицберга и Н. Ф. Аксагарского. - 3-е изд. - [Москва] : Моск. театр. изд-во, 1925. - 79 с.; 18 см.
- Святой отрок Гавриил : Средневековая бейлисиада (Дело об антисемитской агитации в Моск. соборе Василия Блаженного в связи с обнаружением в нем усыпальницы мученика Гавриила). - Москва : Атеист, (1923). - 16 с. : ил.; 26 см.
- Атлас по истории религии / Сост. при участии проф. А. А. Захарова, проф. Е. Г. Кагарова, проф. В. К. Никольского и [др.]; Отв. ред. И. А. Шпицберг. - Москва : Атеист, 1930. - 246, [2] с. : вкл. ил.; 26 см.
- Молот ведьм / Монахи Я. Шпренгер, Г. Инститорис; Пер. с лат. Н. Цветкова; С предисл. проф. С.Г. Лозинского, проф. М.П. Баскина; Редактор И. Шпицберг. - Москва : Атеист, 1932. - 297 с.; 26 см.

== Notes ==
- Atheistic Dictionary / Шпицберг
