= Mikhail Reisner =

Russian jurist, social psychologist and historian

Mikhail Andreevich Reisner
- Михаил Андреевич Рейснер (Russian); Michael von Reusner (German)
- Born: Russian: Михаил Андреевич Рейснер; 19 March 1868; Vileyka, Vilna Governorate, Russian Empire
- Died: August 3, 1928 (aged 60); Moscow, RSFSR, Soviet Union
- Spouse: Ekaterina Aleksandrovna Reisner
- Children: Larissa; Igor

Academic background
- Education: Imperial Warsaw University

Academic work
- Discipline: Law
- Institutions: Tomsk Imperial University; Imperial St. Petersburg University; Moscow State University

Mikhail Andreevich Reisner (Russian: Михаи́л Андре́евич Ре́йснер, German: Michael von Reusner; 19 March 1868 – 3 August 1928) was a Russian and Soviet lawyer, jurist, writer, social psychologist and historian of Baltic German extraction. He was the father of writer Larissa Reisner and orientalist Igor Reisner and adoptive father of naval officer and submariner Lev Reisner.

== Biography ==
Reisner was born in to an aristocratic family of Pomeranian origin. His father was a state official in the Vilna Governorate. He graduated from the Law Faculty of the University of Warsaw in 1893.

From 1893 to 1896, he taught, and in 1896 he was sent to Heidelberg, where he worked for two years. Between 1898 and 1903, he was appointed professor at the Faculty of Law of the University of Tomsk. During this period he published a strong critique of the Russian state's repressive policies vis-à-vis religion and civil society in the pages of Vestnik prava, a major Russian law journal. Reisner advocated for replacing the Polizeistaat model, which he considered outdated, with a "cultural rule-of-law state" that would guarantee the rights of the Empire's citizens, including freedom of conscience and religion. While his suggestions went largely unheeded at the time, he would remain interested in the subject of the separation of Church and State.

As a result of participating in student riots in 1903, he had to resign and was forced to emigrate to Germany and France. At the end of 1905 Reisner returned to Russia and participated in the organisation of the First Conference of the Russian Social Democratic Labour Party in Tammerfors (Tampere). After the defeat of the 1905 revolution, because of his Marxist views, he had to emigrate to Germany and France again and subsequently lectured at the Russian Higher School of Social Sciences in Paris. In 1907, Reisner returned to the Russian Empire and became a lecturer at Saint Petersburg State University.

During World War I, together with his daughter Larisa, he produced the magazine "Rudin". After the October Revolution of 1917, he was appointed a professor at the University of Petrograd, where he helped to develop the first Soviet constitution. He was also the main author of the Decree on the Separation of Church and State.

Reisner was one of the founders of the Communist Academy as a centre of Marxist social science. Reisner was also one of the founders of the Russian Psychoanalytical Society and worked in the People's Commissariat for Education and the People's Commissariat of Justice. Until his death, Reisner taught as a professor in the Moscow State University.

Mikhail Reisner died in 1928 and his ashes were buried at the Donskoye cemetery. His daughter Larisa had died two years earlier, while his adoptive son Lev perished in a camp in 1941 but was later rehabilitated under Khrushchev. His son Igor, however, went on to have a distinguished career in Soviet academia.
