= Decree on Separation of Church and State =

1918 decree by the Russian SFSR

Council of People's Commissars of the Russian Soviet Federative Socialist Republic
- Long title: Decree on Separation of Church from State and School from Church
- Territorial extent: Russian Soviet Federative Socialist Republic
- Enacted by: Council of People's Commissars of the Russian Soviet Federative Socialist Republic
- Enacted: 20 January [O.S. 2 February] 1918
- Signed by: Vladimir Lenin...and others: Nikolai Podvoisky; Vladimir Algasov; Vladimir Trutovsky; Alexander Schlichter; Prosh Proshian; Vyacheslav Menzhinsky; Alexander Shliapnikov; Grigory Petrovsky; Vladimir Bonch-Bruyevich
- Effective: 23 January [O.S. 5 February] 1918
- Introduced by: Pēteris Stučka, Anatoly Lunacharsky, Pyotr Krasikov, Mikhail Reisner and Mikhail Galkin

Repealed by
- Supreme Soviet of Russia
- Status: Repealed

The Decree on Separation of Church from State and School from Church (Note: The law was initially known as the Decree on Freedom of Conscience, Church and Religious Societies (pre-reform Russian: Декретъ о свободѣ совѣсти, церковнихъ и религіознихъ обществахъ; post-reform Russian: Декрет о свободе совести, церковных и религиозных обществах, romanized: Dekret o svoboda sovesti, tserkovnykh i religioznykh obshchestvakh)) (Russian: Декрет об отделении церкви от государства и школы от церкви, romanized: Dekret ob otdelenii tserkvi ot gosudarstva i shkoly ot tserkvi) is a legal act adopted by the Council of People's Commissars of the Russian Soviet Federative Socialist Republic on 20 January [O.S. 2 February] 1918. The decree came into force on 23 January [O.S. 5 February] of the same year, the day of official publication. It installed the secular nature of the state power, proclaimed the freedom of conscience and religion; religious organizations were deprived of any property rights and the rights of a legal entity. It laid the foundation for the deployment of atheistic propaganda and atheistic education.

The Decree was superseded by the a law of the Supreme Soviet of Russia in 25 October 1990, and further superseded in the Russian Federation in 1997. The Decree is frequently shortened in academic sources to the Decree on Separation of Church and State.

== Contents ==
The short edict is composed of 13 declarations regarding religion's role within Soviet sociocultural and political spaces. The edict was first published in the Sobranie Uzakonenii i Rasporiazhenii Rabochego i Krestianskogo Pravitelstva (Collection of Legislation and Orders of the Workers 'and Peasants' Government) in 1918 and solidified that Soviet Russia was to be a non-religious or secular society. Further, while religious observation was technically allowed (No. 3), those practicing could not threaten the public and "disturb the public order" (No. 5) by showing their religious affiliations.

Religious institutions themselves had their social influence retracted, religious teachings in public and private classrooms now banned (No.9) and were now responsible for their own well-being, no longer being financially supported nor institutionally protected by local or state government (No. 10). No. 12 and 13 denounced religious bodies from any type of land or property ownership in accordance with Soviet law at the time, while No. 4 through 8 further separated religious worship from official and public spaces, while also consolidating civic authority. No. 2 forbade state-sanctioned, special treatment of persons or Institutions based on religious affiliation, such a relationship called "Symphonia" or "Caesaropapism" and prior to the Soviet secularization campaigns, served as the premiere model for Church-State relations for Orthodox Russia.

	Decree on Separation of Church and State
1.	The church is separated from the state.
2.	Within the territory of the Republic the passing of any local laws or regulations limiting or interfering with freedom of conscience or granting special rights or privileges to citizens because they belong to a certain faith is forbidden.
3.	Every citizen has a right to adopt any religion or not to adopt any at all. Every legal restriction connected with the profession of certain faiths or with the non-profession of any faith is now abolished.
	Note: Official acts shall make no mention of a citizen's faith.
4.	State or other legal public functions are not to be accompanied by religious ceremonies or rituals.
5.	Religious performances may be carried on freely in so far as they do not disturb the public order or encroach upon the rights of citizens of the Russian Republic. Local authorities have the right to take the necessary measures to preserve order and safeguard the rights of citizens.
6.	No one can decline to carry out his civic duties on the ground of his religious views. Exception to this ruling may be made by special decisions of the people's court provided one civic duty is substituted for another.
7.	Religious oaths are abolished. In case of necessity a solemn promise will suffice.
8.	All civil acts are performed exclusively by the civic authorities [in charge of] the department for the registration of marriages and births.
9.	The school is separated from the church. The teaching of religion in state and public schools, as well as in private schools where general subjects are taught, is forbidden. Citizens may study or teach religious subjects privately.
10.	Church and religious societies are subject to the same laws and regulations as private societies and unions. They do not enjoy any special privileges or subsidies from the state or from local institutions.
11.	The levying of obligatory fees and taxes for the benefit of church or religious societies is forbidden. These organizations are forbidden also to coerce or punish their members.
12.	Church and religious societies have no right to own property. They do not have the rights of a legal person.
13.	All property in Russia now owned by churches and religious organizations is henceforth the property of the people. Buildings and objects that are needed for religious services are given for the free use of religious organizations by special decrees of the central or local state authorities.

The decree was created by a special commission which included: People's Commissar of Justice Pēteris Stučka, the People's Commissar of Education, Anatoly Lunacharsky, a member of the board of the People's Commissariat of Justice Pyotr Krasikov, Mikhail Reisner who was a well-known lawyer and professor of law at St. Petersburg University and a former Orthodox priest turned atheist, Mikhail Galkin.

The edict was signed by Vladimir Lenin under his real last name Ulyanov who acted as Chairman of Sovnarkom, or The Council of People's Commissar. His signature is joined by eight others: Nikolai Podvoisky, Vladimir Algasov, Vladimir Trutovsky, A. Schlichter, Prosh Proshian, Vyacheslav Menzhinsky, Alexander Shliapnikov, Grigory Petrovsky and the manager of the affairs of the Council of People's Commissars Vladimir Bonch-Bruyevich.

== The attitude of the Russian Orthodox Church to the Decree ==
The attitude of the Russian Orthodox Church to the Decree has changed over time. Immediately after the adoption of the Decree, the Local Council of the Russian Orthodox Church adopted a number of documents sharply condemning the Decree:

For centuries, something unheard of has been happening in our Holy Rus'. People who came to power and called themselves people's commissars, themselves alien to the Christian, and some of them, to any faith, issued a decree (law) called "on freedom of conscience," but in fact establishing complete violence against the conscience of believers.

Under the pretext of "separation of Church and state," the Council of People's Commissars is trying to make the very existence of churches, church institutions and the clergy impossible.

In 1942, the church published the book The Truth about Religion in Russia; in this book, as well as in the book The Russian Orthodox Church: Organisation, Situation, Activity, published by the Moscow Patriarchate in 1958, an opposite opinion is expressed in relation to the Decree:

The decree of the Soviet authorities on freedom of conscience, on freedom of religious practice, removed the yoke that had lain on the Church for so many years, it freed the Church from outside tutelage. It was of enormous service to the inner life of the Church. The decree establishes freedom and guaran tees the inviolability of this freedom to all religious communities. It is also of the greatest benefit to our Orthodox Church that she has ceased to be the ruling church, a tool of the autocracy, impeding the freedom of other confessions.

== Literature ==
- Dobronovskaya А. P. Отделение церкви от государства в Енисейской губернии (1920—1922 гг.) // Сибирь в XVII—XX веках: Проблемы политической и социальной истории: Бахрушинские чтения 1999—2000 гг.: межвуз. сб. науч. тр. / под ред. В. И. Шишкина. — Новосибирск: Новосибирский государственный университет, 2002.
- Rassylnikov I.A. Принцип «отделения школы от церкви» как необходимый признак светского государства и его значение в условиях правовой реформы // Правовые реформы в России. — Ростов-на-Дону: Изд-во СКАГС, 2004. — С. 124—129.
- Соколов А. В. (2014). Государство и Православная церковь в России, февраль 1917 — январь 1918 гг. Диссертация на соискание ученой степени доктора исторических наук (PDF). СПб.
