= Revolution and Church =

Soviet magazine

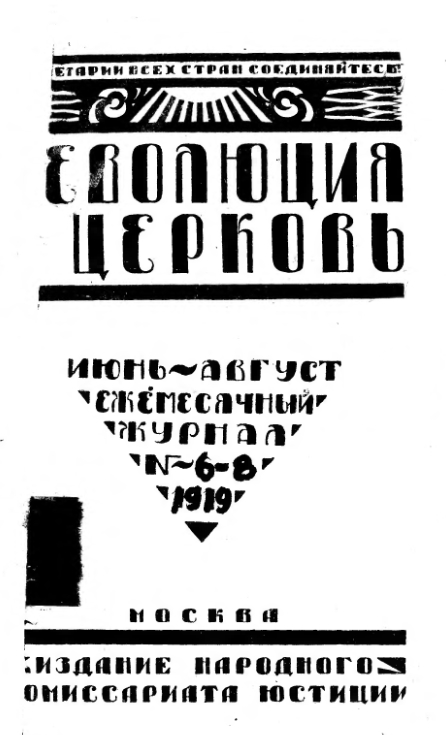
- Editor: Pyotr Krasikov
- Categories: antireligious
- Frequency: Monthly
- Publisher: People's Commissariat of Justice of the Russian SFSR
- Founded: 1919
- Final issue: 1924
- Country: Soviet Union
- Based in: Moscow
- Language: Russian

Revolution and Church (Russian: Революция и церковь) was a monthly magazine published in the Russian SFSR and the Soviet Union from 1919 to 1924. It was the first anti-religious publication in the Soviet Union after the October Revolution.

== History ==
The magazine was created on the initiative of the head of the VIII department of the People's Commissar of Justice Pyotr Krasikov and the expert of the VIII department Mikhail Galkin (Gorev), a former priest turned atheist who prepared the Decree on Separation of Church and State. Krasikov was the executive editor of the magazine and Galkin acted as co-editor.

Prominent figures of the Communist Party and the Soviet state such as Nikolai Semashko and Anatoly Lunacharsky published articles on the magazine.

The magazine covered issues related to the implementation of the decree, fought against militant clericalism of all confessions and published material on the counter-revolutionary agitation of the clergy.
