= Pyotr Krasikov =

Soviet politician, jurist and bureaucrat (1870–1939)

- Пётр Красиков
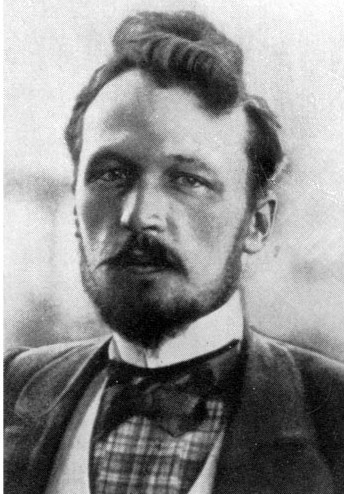

Procurator General of the Soviet Union
- In office 15 March 1924 – 20 June 1933
- Premier: Alexey Rykov; Vyacheslav Molotov
- Preceded by: Position established
- Succeeded by: Ivan Akulov

Personal details
- Born: 17 October 1870 Krasnoyarsk, Russian Empire
- Died: 20 August 1939 (aged 68) Zheleznovodsk, Russian SFSR, Soviet Union
- Party: RSDLP (1902–1903); RSDLP (Bolsheviks) (1903–1918); Russian Communist Party (1918–1939)
- Profession: Jurist, bureaucrat

Pyotr Ananyevich Krasikov (Russian: Петр Ананьевич Красиков; 17 October [O.S. 5 October] 1870 – 20 August 1939) was a Russian revolutionary and Soviet politician, jurist and bureaucrat who was the first Procurator General of the Soviet Union, serving from 1924 to 1933.

== Career ==
Pyotr Krasikov was born in Krasnoyarsk, where he was brought up from the age of 12 by his grandfather, an Archpriest, after the early death of his father, a lawyer. He was expelled from the Krasnoyarsk gymnasium for bad behaviour, but reinstated after his grandfather intervened.

In the years 1892–1893, Krasikov visited Switzerland and met with Russian Marxists, met with the leaders of the "Emancipation of Labor" group of Georgy Plekhanov, Pavel Axelrod and Vera Zasulich and joined Emancipation of Labour group in 1892. After returning home in 1894, he was arrested and kept in a solitary confinement cell in the Peter and Paul Fortress until he was bailed out by his sister, and ordered to return to Krasnoyarsk under police supervision. In 1895 despite the police supervision, Krasikov managed to create the first Marxist circle in Krasnoyarsk among students of the paramedic and midwife school.

In 1897 Lenin passed through Krasnoyarsk on his way into exile in a Siberian village, and met Krasikov and became close to each other.

Together with Lenin, he took part in meetings with political exiles who lived in Krasnoyarsk or who stopped here in transit. He saw Lenin's comrades in the Petersburg Union of Struggle for the Emancipation of the Working Class. And after their departure, he met many party exiles and helped them.

For correspondence and communication with political exiles Krasikov was extended the period of public supervision of the police for another year. He later choose Pskov as his residing place and joined the local Iskra-ist. He was involved in the illegal transportation of Iskra from Germany to Russia. He was on trial in Germany, where Karl Liebknecht defended him. He was convicted but again released on bail.

Later he joined the Russian Social Democratic Labour Party In November 1902, he was a member of the committee set up to organise the II Congress of the RSDLP, and together with Lenin and Plekhanov, he was a member of the Bureau of the Congress. When the split occurred during the Congress between Bolsheviks and Mensheviks, Krasikov joined the Bolsheviks, and stayed in Switzerland to help Lenin create a separate the Bolshevik organisation.

Krasikov returned to Russia during the 1905 Revolution, and was in charge of the agitation department of the Petersburg Party Committee. At the III Congress of the RSDLP he was a delegate with an advisory voice. After the revolution had been suppressed, he drifted out of revolutionary politics to practise as a lawyer.

After the 1917 Russian Revolution his positions were related to legal issues and he is considered to be among the principal creators of the Soviet legal system, along with Andrey Vyshinsky. He was Deputy People's Commissar of Justice from 1918. He was the initiator of the first Soviet anti-religious publication, Revolution and Church. Krasikov was Prosecutor General of the Supreme Court from 1924, and Deputy Chairman of the Supreme Court from 1933 to 1938. He was removed from his seat on the Supreme Court during the Great Purge "without explanation."

Krasikov died in 1939 in the city of Zheleznovodsk, where he was being treated for his illness, and was buried there.

== Personality ==
Israel Getzler, in Martov: A Political Biography of a Russian Social Democrat (Cambridge U.P., 1967, p. 74), says he was "intensely disliked by all and sundry [with the exception of Lenin]... [Boris Nikolaevsky] sums him up as a drunken brawler... J. Steinberg, Als ich Volkskommisar war (Munich, 1929), has devoted an entire chapter... to Krasikov's misdeeds as co-chairman (together with the notorious M. Iu. Kozlovsky) of the Cheka of the Petrograd Soviet in the winter of 1917–18."
