= Yunyye Bezbozhniki =

Soviet atheistic magazine (1931–1933)

Yunyye Bezbozhniki (Юные безбожники)
- Editor: I. A. Flerov
- Categories: antireligious
- Frequency: Monthly
- Founded: March, 1931
- Final issue: January, 1933
- Country: Soviet Union/Russia
- Based in: Moscow
- Language: Russian

Yunyye Bezbozhniki: zhurnal shkol'nogo bezbozhnogo aktiva (Russian: «Юные безбожники: журнал школьного безбожного актива»; translation of the name: «Young Atheists: Magazine of Atheist Schoolchildren-Activists», or «Young Godless: Magazine of Godless Schoolchildren-Activists») was a monthly magazine for schoolchildren, an organ of the Central Committee of the Komsomol, the People's Commissariat of Education of the RSFSR and the Central Soviet of the League of Militant Atheists of the USSR.

It was published in Moscow from March 1931 to February 1933. A total of 23 issues were printed. Yunyye Bezbozhniki delivered soviet atheistic propaganda and imparted the Party's view on the history of religion and atheism, science, technology, as well as on the atheistic movement among young people in the USSR and abroad. The magazine provided scientific and methodological assistance in the atheistic education of students, and summarized the experience of anti-religious school circles. The editor-in-chief of the magazine was the famous Moscow-based educator and atheist I. A. Flerov.

The Editorial Board of the magazine consisted of: N. Amosov, A. Smirnov, I. Flerov. Writers for the magazine included: L. Kassil, S. Kirsanov, V. Smirnova, M. Gershenzon, G. Gradov, A, Nasimovich, N. Sher and others. The magazine also included works by cartoonists such as: D. Moor, P. Staronosov, A. Korotkin, A. Kozlov and others.

The slogan of the magazine, which was printed above the title of the magazine on the right, was: "The struggle against religion – the struggle for socialism" (Russian: «Борьба против религии — борьба за социализм»). The magazine was published by the Publishing House «Moskovskiy Rabochiy» («Moscow Worker»), OGIZ.

== See also ==
- Bezbozhnik (newspaper)
- Council for Religious Affairs
- Culture of the Soviet Union
- Demographics of the Soviet Union
- Persecutions of the Catholic Church and Pius XII
- Persecution of Christians in the Soviet Union
- Persecution of Christians in Warsaw Pact countries
- Persecution of Muslims in the former USSR
- Red Terror
- Religion in Russia
- Religion in the Soviet Union
- Society of the Godless
- Soviet Orientalist studies in Islam
- State atheism
- USSR anti-religious campaign (1917–1921)
- USSR anti-religious campaign (1921–1928)
- USSR anti-religious campaign (1928–1941)
- USSR anti-religious campaign (1958–1964)
- USSR anti-religious campaign (1970s–1990)
