= Gulsum Asfendiyarova =

Kazakh medical doctor and teacher

- Гүлсім Асфендиярова
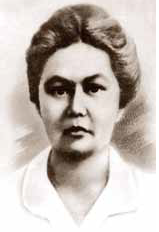
- Asfendiyarova in a 1920 illustration
- Born: 12 November 1880; Tashkent, Russian Empire
- Died: 1937 (aged 56–57); Tashkent, Uzbek SSR, Soviet Union
- Education: Tashkent Women's Gymnasium (1890); Medical Institute for Women (now First Pavlov State Medical University) (1897)
- Known for: first Kazakh female doctor
- Parents: Seitzhafar Asfendiyarov (father); Gulyandam Asfendiyarova (mother)
- Family: Sanjar Asfendiyarov (brother)

Gülsim Jafarqyzy Asfendiarova (Note: Often transliterated as Gulsum Dzhafarovna Asfendiyarova through a Russified Romanization of Гульсум Джафаровна Асфендиярова.) (Kazakh: Гүлсім Жафарқызы Асфендиярова; November 12 1880 – 1937) was the first Kazakh woman to earn a medical degree. She played a key role in organizing the healthcare system in the Turkestan region and was also a dedicated medical educator.

== Biography ==
=== Early life and education ===
Asfendiyarova was born in 1880 in Tashkent. She was the third daughter of Seitzhafar Asfendiyarov, a descendant of Abu'l Khair Khan of the Junior Jüz, and Gulyandam Asfendiyarova (née Kasymova). Her father served as a military interpreter under the Turkestan Governor-General and retired in 1916 with the rank of Major-General. It is hypothesized that her maternal ancestry traces back to Ablai Khan of the Middle Jüz. Among her eight siblings was Sanjar Asfendiyarov, a well-known Kazakh scholar and politician.

Like her sisters, Gulsum received her primary education at home. In 1890, at the age of ten, she enrolled in the Tashkent Women's Gymanisum, from which she successfully graduated in 1899.

The Medical Institute for Women (now First Pavlov State Medical University) opened in St. Petersburg in 1897. It was the first institution in Europe where women could obtain higher medical education. Some officials from the Turkestan Governorate were eager for their daughters to be educated there. However, travelling to the capital was costly, and few could afford it.

In 1902, after two graduates from the Medical Institute began working in Turkestan, the Governorate Council established a scholarship for 10 local girls to study at the institute. That same year, two Turkestani girls, Gulsum Asfendiyarova and Zeyneb Abdurakhmanova, received scholarship along with eight daughters of Russian officials. Abdurakhmanova was reportedly ethnically Tatar, and, after graduating in 1908, Asfendiyarova became known as the first Kazakh female doctor.

=== Career ===
After graduating, Asfendiyarova filed a petition to Emperor Nicholas II on May 16, 1908, to be appointed as a district doctor in the Turkestan Military District, the village of Temirlanovka, Shymkent district of Syr-Darya. The petition was likely motivated by the desire to be closer to her father in Shymkent. Less than a month later, on June 5, her request was granted, and she officially became a district physician.

Poverty and lack of access to medical care were significant sources of epidemiological problems in the district. Asfendiyarova conducted house-to-house visits, discussing home and personal hygiene with residents. Despite minimal funding, she remained resilient, writing to her father: "I was deeply honored to hold a high position at the hospital, where female doctors had rarely been seen before."

In 1910, Asfendiyarova transferred first to Xonobod and then to the Pop District of Namangan County, where working conditions were slightly better. In late 1911, Asfendiyarova's father conveyed a proposal from the Khiva Khan for her to work at a city hospital, then still under construction. Gulsum agreed, provided that her salary and benefits were not less than those in the Russian medical service. In 1913, she began her duties as an obstetrician-assistant to the chief physician in Khiva. Here, for the first time in the history of the Khanate of Khiva, she performed a Caesarean section.

In 1913 (or 1914), during turbulent times, Asfendiyarova returned to Tashkent and became head of the city maternity hospital. Over time, and with her father’s support, she became actively involved in the region's social and political life. Following the February Revolution she was nominated as a delegate to the All-Russian Congress of Muslim Women, which took place in April 1917 in Kazan. There, Asfendiyarova was elected a member of the Organizing Bureau.

Returning to Tashkent, Asfendiarova continued leading the city maternity hospital and actively participated in the political life of the Turkestan ASSR. She also assisted her brother, Sanjar Asfendiarov, a fellow physician and future Minister of Health of the Kazakh ASSR, in his efforts to organize aid for the hungry and homeless.

In 1918, with the support of the Muslim Bureau of the Turkestan Communist Party and its head, Turar Ryskulov, Asfandiarova organized obstetric courses for women. The courses were later incorporated into the Akhunbaev Medical College in Tashkent. She continued to teach there until her death. Asfendiyarova was also repeatedly elected a member of the Tashkent City Council, publicly advocating for improvements in the social sphere and the protection of motherhood and childhood.

Since 1922, Asfendiyarova combined teaching with work in the Tashkent City Children's Hospital, where her assistant was Akkagaz Dosjanova, the first graduate of the National University of Uzbekistan. Asfendiyarova had known Dosjanova from the All-Russian Congress of Muslim Women. In this way, the pursuit of equal professional rights for women in Central Asia continued.

=== Later life ===
Asfendiyarova's later life is largely unknown. During the Great Purge, Asfendiyarova's brother was arrested in 1937 and later executed, and his wife and daughter were exiled to Siberia. As the daughter of a tsarist military Major-General and the sister of an enemy of the people, Asfendiyarova's life hung in the balance. Asfendiyarova died that same year. Her death was announced in a local newspaper on October 25, 1937.

Her burial place was long considered unknown. However, in 2021, local activists found her grave in the Botkin cemetery, Tashkent.
