= Tumani Corrah =

Gambian clinician

Sir Tumani Corrah KBE, MRG
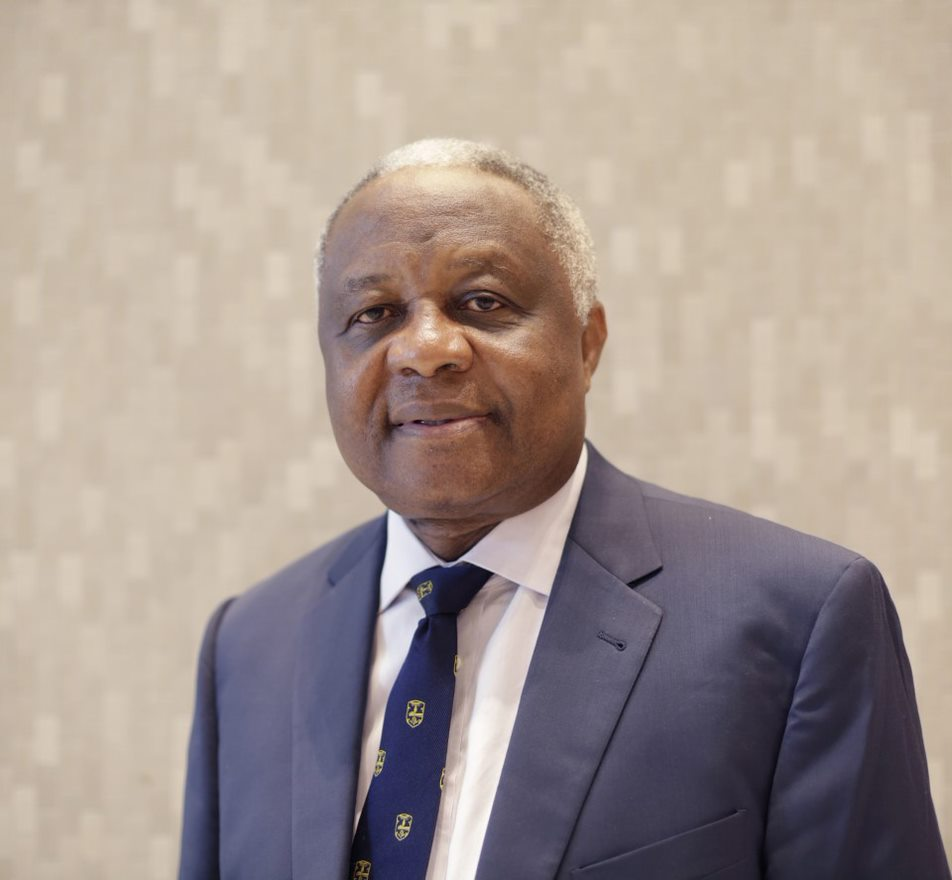
- Sir Tumani Corrah KBE MRG
- Known for: Study of Infectious Diseases
- Awards: CBE 2007; KBE 2019
- Scientific career
- Fields: Clinician Scientist

Sir Tumani Corrah, KBE, MRG is a Gambian clinician whose fields of research include tuberculosis, HIV and malaria. Corrah is Director of the Africa Research Excellence Fund (AREF) and Director, Africa Research Development, Medical Research Council.

== Academic career ==
Tumani Corrah studied medicine at the First Pavlov State Medical University of St Petersburg, Russia and University College Ibadan, Nigeria. In the late seventies he went to the UK, first to Edinburgh then to Wales, where he trained for his Membership of the Royal College of Physicians as a chest physician in the Department of Medicine, Gwynedd General Hospital. In 1981, after obtaining his MRCP he was appointed consultant physician.

In 2014, Tumani Corrah was appointed as the first Emeritus Director of the MRC Unit in the Gambia and was awarded an Honorary Fellowship by The London School of Hygiene and Tropical Medicine in recognition of his outstanding contribution to the progress of clinical research in The Gambia and in West Africa as a whole.

Corrah has been a host of the Falling Walls conference.

== Research interests ==
Corrah has published over 140 publications in peer reviewed journals and his most recent work has focused on tuberculosis, pneumonia and the role of leadership in people-centred health systems.

== Other activities ==
- The INDEPTH Network, Chair of the Board of Trustees (since 2017)
- Bill and Melinda Gates Foundation, Member of the Global Health Scientific Advisory Committee
- World Health Organization (WHO), Member of the African Advisory Committee for Research and Development

== Honours and other forms of recognition ==
- Appointed a Member of the Order of the Republic (The Gambia)
- In 2007, Corrah was appointed Honorary Commander of the Order of the British Empire.
- In 2016, Corrah was nominated by the listeners of one of BBC World Service's longest-running radio programmes, Outlook, as one of the world's most extraordinary people.
- In 2016, Sir Leszek Borysiewicz named Tumani Corrah and Uganda's Nelson Sewankambo as Africa's two top scientists.
- In 2019, Corrah was appointed Honorary Knight Commander of the Order of the British Empire. The award became substantive in 2021, which allows him to use both 'Sir' and 'KBE'.
