= Orders, decorations, and medals of The Gambia =

The orders, decorations, and medals of The Gambia constitute the state honors system of The Gambia. The current system was officially established in 1972, replacing the British honors system.

== Order of the Republic ==
The Order of the Republic is the highest national honor. Instituted in 1972 by President Dawda Jawara, it honors both Gambian citizens and foreign officials. The President of the Gambia serves as the Grand Master of the order.

== Military Decorations of the Gambia Armed Forces ==
- Distinguished Service Medal
- Special Honour Medal
- Special Military Award Medal
- Millennium Medal

=== Campaign Medals ===
- General Service Medal
- Long Service and Good Conduct Medal
- Fire Service Long Service Medal
- UNAMSIL Medal

== Commemorative Medals ==
- Commemorative Medal for the 10th Anniversary of Independence

== See also ==
- List of military decorations
