= Soviet Orientalist studies in Islam =

Academic discourses on Islam by Soviet theoreticians

Soviet Orientalist studies in Islam are academic discourses by Soviet Marxist theoreticians about Islam, its origins and development based on historical materialism and Muslims. The central question of this discourse was how Muslim society would fit into the general development of human history. Prominent Soviet orientalists include Mikhail A. Reisner, Evgenii Beliaev, Liutsian I. Klimovich, Mikhail L. Tomara, Valentin Ditiakin and Sandzhar D. Asfendiarov.

== Background ==
The October Revolution brought the Communist Party of the Soviet Union to power. The Soviet Union had a large Muslim population of various ethnicities. Therefore, there was a pressing need for original research as Marx, Engels only dealt with the subject superficially. In the 1920s, the Bolsheviks created new institutions and organizations intended to produce devoted Marxist scholars of Oriental studies. Foremost among them was the Moscow Institute for Oriental Studies, a party school created in 1920 mainly for the requirements of the Soviet foreign service. Its counterpart for educating party workers and administrators from the Eastern regions and republics of Russia and the USSR, as well as for training communists from abroad, was the Communist University of the Toilers of the Orient, a school founded in 1921. The new Marxist discourse on Islam was dominated by scholars from these political teaching and research institutions.

== Communist theory of Islam ==
In 1923, Zinatullah Navshirvanov (a Volga Tatar communist who was also active in the formation of a communist party in Atatürk's new Republic of Turkey) in the journal Novyi Vostok proposed that there were several forms of communism in Islamic history. The authors detected a “primitive communism” already in the activities of some of Muhammad's companions, but they found that communism was even more prominent in the tradition of Islamic Sufism. Under the cover of Sufism communist ideas and movements emerged that had nothing to do with Islam and religion whatsoever. These movements were driven by Muslims—poor nomads as well as peasants and urban craftsmen—longing to overthrow the feudal order of their times, i.e., the Abbasid, Seljukid, and Ottoman dynasties in the Near East. As examples the Navshirvanovs mentioned the Shiʿi Ismailites, the Anatolian Futūwa and Akhī organizations, and the Bektashi order of dervishes. The climax of this supposed anti-feudal Sufi communist movement was Sheikh Bedreddin of Simavna who was executed by the Ottomans in 1416 as a heretic; his disciples led peasant rebellions against Ottoman rule and set up what the Navshirvanov called the “first revolutionary government of Anatolia”.

This theory suffered from lack of sufficient historical evidence and was superseded by other theories.

== Trade capitalism theory ==
Mikhail A. Reisner (Michael von Reusner, 1868–1928), ethnic German historian of law and publicist produced a detailed Marxist analysis of the Koran from the perspective of social studies. His interpretation of Islam can be found in two articles on “The Koran and Its Social Ideology”, published in 1926 in a Soviet literary journal. In these studies Reisner maintained that Islam was the religion of the Arab merchants of Mecca. He distinguished between the big merchants, that is, the rich families of Mecca, and the less affluent and poor merchant families. Due to the disunion of the Arab tribes, trade caravans were constantly running the risk of being raided by nomads. These caravans were organized as joint ventures of rich and less affluent trade families of the Quraysh tribe, but the poorer merchants invested, and therefore risked, a higher percentage of their capital than the rich families. For this reason the idea of a union of the Arab tribes under one monotheistic religion was developed by the poorer families of the Quraysh, for only such a union would eliminate the raids. Their speaker became Muhammad, who himself hailed from one of the less privileged Quraysh clans.

Reisner maintains that the Koran portrayed Allah as "a rich, powerful and smart capitalist". In Medina, Muhammad acted not so much as a prophet and preacher but as a skillful organizer. He was successful not because people were eager to join a new religion but because they longed for a law that would unite them. The Koran, Reisner continues, only guarantees the right to property and creates a “World Trade Company of Believers” (mirovaia torgovaia kompaniia veruiushchikh) under God's own leadership. Many elements in the Koran reflect a merchant's position: the prayers and rituals are not very complex and do not require “spiritual contortions”; the pilgrimage to Mecca (ḥajj) is linked to a trade fair; tithes (zakāt) is restricted to a moderate level, and believers are exhorted not to squander their money; while usury is forbidden, Muslims are encouraged to make moderate profits; and, of course, the Koran emphasizes the importance of oaths, correct measurements, and the faithful return of the deposit.

Reisner explains that mystical elements, which tended to supersede the clear class distinctions, were to enter Islam only much later, mainly stemming from the Persian tradition.

Reisner's interpretation turned out to be very influential among Soviet scholars of the late 1920s.

=== Beliaev's modification of trade capitalism theory ===
Evgenii Beliaev (1895–1964) was the only professional trained in Oriental languages among all participants in the early Soviet discourse on Islam. In his contribution to the 1930 special issue of Ateist on the origins of Islam, Beliaev argued that Islam emerged from the merchant environment of Mecca. The pagan religion served the purpose of trade, and the authority of the gods in the kaaba grew with the wealth of the merchants. Islam emerged in the late 6th century as a movement of the less wealthy, “intermediary and lower Meccan bourgeoisie” against this “‘aristocracy’ of avaricious traders and pitiless usurers.”

In contrast to Reisner, however, Beliaev did not see anything progressive, liberating, or even revolutionary in this initial Islam: for instance, Islam did not stand up against slavery. Beliaev compared the image of God in the Koran to that of a despot and slave owner.

According to Beliav, a similar struggle was taking place in Medina, where some clans became dependent upon others, and especially upon the Jewish clans, whose wealth was based on “usury capital” (rostovshchicheskii kapital). The gradual dissolution of the ancient tribal and clan structures in Muslim Medina must not be ascribed to the religion of Islam but rather to the development of Meccan trade capital, and in general to the transition to private property in slaves, cattle, and other possessions. “With an eagerness and love for detail that is characteristic for the petty bourgeoisie, the boring, depressing and dull Suras of the Medinan period lay down the regulations for property and inheritance as well as buying and selling”. In Medina Muhammad changed the prayer direction from Jerusalem to Mecca; “praying to the Muslim God, they bow down before the only god that they respect, namely capital.” When the “medium wealthy” traders finally took over Mecca, they reached their goal: together with the rich “Quraysh of the Center” they found themselves at the helm of the “trade capitalist organization of the Hijaz” which eventually united the tribes of Arabia. The nomads, by contrast, did not play an active role in Beliaev's scenario; after Muhammad's death they easily committed apostasy and had to be forced back to Islam by the first caliph, Abu Bakr.

== Ditiakin ==
Valentin Ditiakin, an expert on the history of Marxism, took as his starting point the works of Marx and Engels instead of Islamic tradition, nor Western Oriental studies or even Reisner. Ditiakin conceded that Marx and Engels had only limited sources at their disposal and never devoted a special study to Islam; nevertheless he believed they came to important insights on this topic.

According to Ditiakin, Marx and Engels understood that pre-Islamic Arabia was characterized by two different environments, that of nomadic Bedouins and that of settled urban traders. As the correspondences of the two thinkers show, the Bedouins could hardly be characterized as bearers of high culture, whereas the population of the southwestern Arabian peninsula was a “civilized” Oriental high culture. Obviously, Engels had access to publications on petroglyphs from Yemen, which, in his mind, reflected “the ancient, national Arabic tradition of monotheism”. However, in the centuries immediately before Muhammad the old culture of Yemen was destroyed by incursions of the Ethiopians, and consequently also the Arabian trade route to the north via Mecca was in decay. This decline of trade in the period before Muhammad was, as Engels wrote to Marx in 1853, “one of the chief factors in the Muhammadan revolution”.

To quote Engels again, “it seems that Mohammad's religious revolution, like every religious movement, was formally a reaction, an alleged return to the old, the simple”. “the movement [of Muhammad] has seemed to me to have the character of a Bedouin reaction against the settled but degenerate fellahin of the towns, who at that time had also become very decadent in their religion, mingling a corrupt nature-cult with corrupt Judaism and Christianity.” The decline referred to by Engels was thus economic and religious.

According to Ditiakin, Engels’ statements led to the apparent contradiction that the uncivilized Bedouins, who were defeated and driven out of their country by foreign invaders, created an “ideological system” that would ultimately rescue Arabia and soon rule over a huge part of the world. In Ditiakin's mind, this apparent contradiction can only be solved by the following line of reasoning: The cradle of Islam was characterized by a coexistence of the nomadic lifestyle of the Bedouins and the formerly highly developed trade economy of the “urban fellahs”, which was however in decline, but still “potentially” stronger than the Bedouin culture. A series of “revolutionary blows” was necessary to dissolve the contradictions between the two, and to free the trade formation from its restrictions. These blows came in the form of foreign invasions, as Engels had suggested in 1853: “The expulsion of the Abyssinians took place about forty years before Mohammed and was obviously the first act of the awakening Arabian national consciousness, which was also spurred by Persian invasions from the North, pushing forward almost to Mecca”.

For Ditiakin, Islam had a Bedouin character, and Bedouin lifestyle had a huge impact on the new religion. Due to the course of the Islamic expansion, however, the emergent religion of Islam was soon adapted to the foundations of urban economy. Accordingly, Islam eliminated the relics of the clan-based society and became the ideology of an urban society. The old nomadic and Bedouin cultural heritage of Islam, however, turned out to be strong enough to prevent Islam from becoming dominant in Europe. Ditiakin came to the conclusion that Muhammad's fight against the Quraysh of Mecca was “a revolution of the dying Bedouin culture against developing trade capital”—seemingly the exact contrary to Reisner's trade capitalism theory.

== Bedouin theory ==
Another interpretation of the role of the Bedouins was brought forward by the Kazakh communist and historian Sandzhar D. Asfendiarov (1889–1938). In 1928, during his brief directorate of the Moscow Oriental Institute, Asfendiarov published his first booklet on the “Reasons for the Emergence of Islam”.

Asfendiarov regarded Islam as the product not of the merchants of Mecca, as Reisner did, but of the Arab nomads. To him, the Islamic expansion was a huge emigration wave of about one million nomads from the Hijaz and Najd regions of Arabia to the outside world. Asfendiarov maintained that Islam emerged as the last huge expansion of Semite tribes from Arabia. However, Asfendiarov insisted that this expansion resulted from changes in the nomadic economy, not from climate change.

According to him, the Arabs were beyond the formation of “primitive patriarchal nomadism”; rather, they possessed a “developed”, modified cattle breeding economy. By the 7th century, Arabia suffered from a scarcity in land for cattle breeding. The Byzantine and Persian empires in the North, and the Persian and Ethiopian interventions in Yemen, resulted in an isolation of Central Arabia, as well as in a heightened competition for the available pastures. Due to this scarcity and competition, Arab tribes now occupied the oases and towns of the Hijaz, like Mecca and Medina, which had hitherto been inhabited mainly by Jews and other settled populations. The Arabic tribes that conquered these settlements took over the agricultural and merchant activities that had been in place. Some Bedouin tribes, like the Quraysh, therefore turned into trading tribes. Due to the increased mutual raiding and warfare among cattle-breeders, more and more Arab nomads lost their livestock, settled around these settlements as pauperized and dependent clans, and took on agricultural work to make a living.

For all of these reasons, the tribal economy of 7th-century Arabia constituted more than just a primitive patriarchal society, for the majority of transhumant cattle-breeders was supplemented by Arab traders and Arab agriculturalists (or “semi-agriculturalists”, as Asfendiarov had it, for they still had connections to the nomadic way of life). Taken together, these three social groups still made up one single economic formation, one that was characterized by a certain amount of economic specialization with all ensuing social contradictions, especially a marked distinction between rich and poor. What they all had in common was their tribal organization, which did not evolve into a community- or neighborhood-based social organization. The tribal organization, according to Asfendiarov, was not simply a “residue” (perezhitok) of the past that was doomed to vanish, but rather a very functional element necessary for survival in all three economic environments. He concluded that the Orient was characterized not by a historical sequence of primitive-patriarchal, feudal, and capitalist society, as in the West, but by one tribal formation that combined elements from all three formations. According to Asfendiarov, this tribal formation was retained at least until the 16th century.

Islam, in Asfendiarov's mind, was nothing but the event that triggered off the social expansion of the Arab tribes, uniting the tribes to break the isolation of Arabia. It was an “unconscious impulse”, an “almost secondary reason” for the movement of the tribes. Islam should therefore be understood as an economic movement of the tribes. Accordingly, Asfendiarov strongly criticized Reisner's view that Islam embodied the interests of the Meccan traders.

== Peasant theory ==
A completely new interpretation of the rise of Islam was brought forward by the economist Mikhail L. Tomara. Tomara's article in the Ateist special issue of 1930, entitled “The Origin of Islam and Its Class Basis”, points at the role of peasants and agriculture in 7th-century Arabia. Tomara listed up a vast number of witnesses, taken partly from al-Ṭabarī (d. 923), but mostly from European travellers like Niebuhr, Burton and Palgrave, and especially from Aloys Sprenger's Das Leben und Werk des Mohammed (1861–1865), showing that Arabia's agricultural and horticultural population vastly exceeded its Bedouin population, not to speak of the merchants.

In Tomara's mind, agriculture was mainly taken up by impoverished Bedouins; under the general climate change in Arabia, Bedouins whose pastures dried up would either emigrate or, when the emigration was blocked as was the case before Islam, dig wells and settle down to pursue agriculture with the help of artificial irrigation. The continuous transformation of pasture land into fields led to an intensified struggle between the Bedouins and the peasant population. Tomara assumed that the agriculturalists consisted mainly of clients (mawālī, sing. mawla) of powerful clans, manumitted slaves and other dislocated people. Poor agriculturalists would become dependent on usurers and often lose their house, land, and cattle, thus being forced to work as hired pastors (Russ. batraki) for rich neighbors. Tomara thus distinguished three “classes”: nomads, well-to-do peasants, and impoverished peasants who lived a semi-transhumant or even transhumant life (obviously, while herding the Bedouins’ cattle). Incidentally, he provided no source for his assumption that impoverished peasants sold their labor as pastors.

Tomara further maintained that trade was only slightly developed in 7th-century Arabia, and therefore Islam cannot be credited to it: “Islam was born in the trade city of Mecca, but only as an expression of the dissatisfaction of the poor strata of the city; and it turned out to be unsuccessful there. Trade capital, as a fierce opponent of Islam, defeated Islam and drove it out of Mecca”

Subsequently, Islam found a solid class basis in Medina, an exclusively agricultural town. The Koran's endorsement of charity, so Tomara, the use of alms to support the poor, to manumit slaves, and to relieve debtors from their financial burdens, shows clearly that Islam emerged as the religion of the urban poor. The poor emigrants (muhājirūn) from Mecca joined the urban poor of Medina and broke the power of the rich Medinan landowners who had opposed Muhammad at several occasions. As indicated in Koran 59:7, Muhammad allotted agricultural lands in and around Medina to his poor supporters as well as to people who flocked to him from other agricultural communities in Arabia. The increasing need to reward peasant supporters led to the expulsion, and later annihilation, of the Jewish clans of Medina, for they held the best arable land in and around the oasis.

By contrast, Muhammad did not invest much energy into the fight against the Quraysh, for there was no peasant land to gain from dry Mecca; the few famous battles like Badr (in 624) were mere skirmishes, and the later battle at Uhud and the Meccan siege of Medina show that Muhammad was clearly on the defensive against his hometown. Tomara found support for his “peasant theory” in the Koran; its ban of interest, in his mind, expressed the interests of agriculturalists who suffered from exploitation by usurers. Also, he suggested that the Koranic inheritance laws reflect the ongoing splitting-up of agricultural land in Medina.

The nomads, by contrast, did not play an active role in Tomara's scenario; they were unreliable as warriors, and they accepted Islam only superficially. Also, “if Islam was the religion of the nomadic cattle-breeders, then Paradise would have been depicted [in the Koran] as infinite steppes of high grass, similar to the way how American Indians imagined their reward in the Hereafter as hunting grounds in prairies with plenty of bisons and other wild animals.”

Accordingly, in the War of Apostasy (ridda) after Muhammad's death the Bedouin tribes tried to reclaim the pasture lands they had lost to the poor Medinans and to agriculture. But this rebellion was crushed by Abū Bakr, and the nomads found themselves forced to emigrate. As both the Sassanid and the Byzantine empire were now in political and economical disarray, the Bedouins found an easy outlet by emigration to Persia, Syria, and Egypt. In result, and somewhat surprisingly, the Islamic expansion under the first caliphs was mainly undertaken by nomads driven out of their territories by Islam itself. Thus, in its beginnings Islam was the ideology of the peasants, and only later, under the Abbasids after 750, did Islam become “the ideology of trade capital in the form of Mu’tazilism, and the ideology of the feudal classes of Persia in the form of Shi’ism.”

Tomara's interpretation thus does not ignore the role of nomadic Bedouins and urban traders, and even assigns them meaningful roles in the emergence and spread of Islam. Their functions, however, were mainly defined in the negative. Because Tomara pointed out the crucial role of the poor agriculturalists in and around the towns, his concept would be regarded by his opponents as a mere “peasant theory”.

== Klimovich ==
Liutsian I. Klimovich (1907–1989), in his first major scholarly article, entitled “On the Origin of Islam”, made references to a considerable number of Western Orientalists (like Dozy, Nöldeke, Muir, Weil, von Kremer, Lammens, and Sprenger) and largely followed Mikhail Reisner's theory that Islam emerged from Meccan trade capitalism. The opposition of the poor merchant families was directed against the rich clans and their pagan cult at the kaaba. This opposition manifested itself first in the movement of the Arab Hanif monotheists which was later to develop into Islam. Klimovich maintained that this movement was originally atheist, progressive and revolutionary in character; when Muhammad became its figurehead the movement took on religious traits, yet without losing its progressive character right away. After the hijra to Medina Muhammad turned into a dexterous politician for whom Islam was nothing but a means to gain power. Similarly, the Arab tribes that joined the movement were only interested in booty, not in religion. After a series of battles the reactionary merchants of Mecca decided to embrace the new religion, because they understood that Islam would provide them with a new instrument for ruling over the Arab tribes. It is at the hands of these rich merchant families, according to Klimovich, that Islam finally turned from a revolutionary movement into an instrument for oppression and spiritual enslavement of the Muslim masses. It seems that with his insistence on the “progressive” character of early Islam Klimovich intended to develop a new and specific strategy for anti-Islamic propaganda, one that would pull the carpet from underneath the believers’ feet. After graduating in 1929 Klimovich returned to his hometown Kazan, where he was a member of the local branch of the League of the Militant Godless (Soiuz Voinstvuiushchikh Bezbozhnikov, SVB). That same year he published his first two books. In Sotsialisticheskoe Stroitel’stvo na Vostoke i Religiia, Klimovich maintained that the Muslim periphery of the Soviet Union was witnessing an ongoing revival of Islam. Under the conditions of the New Economic Policy, reformist mullahs tried to convince the Muslim masses that Islam was perfectly compatible with socialism.

Klimovich warned that this was a deception, for socialism was based on Marxism, materialism, and the dialectical method, and diametrically opposed to religion and its idealism. Atheist propagandists, however, were often helpless in their discussions with the believers. What Klimovich considered necessary, therefore, was basic information on Islam for the anti-religious activist. This was the purpose of his second book of 1929, Soderzhanie korana (“The Contents of the Koran”). This book was basically a compilation of quotations from the Koran. Klimovich explained the book's structure, the Koranic image of God, as well as its narratives on the creation of the world, Judgment Day, Paradise, and Hell. Above all, he emphasized internal contradictions in the Koranic message and the scientific inaccurateness and simplicity of the scripture.

Klimovich's Koran book still followed Mikhail Reisner's view that Islam emerged from Meccan merchant capitalism. The Koran, according to Klimovich, was an “Arabic law book” which demanded discipline in the interest of the merchant corporation, whose codex it represents. Besides trade, a second “way” demanded in the holy book of Islam is endurance and obedience to God, the Prophet and his family, as well as to the “people in power”, which, in Klimovich's mind, clearly reflected the reactionary turn of Islam. The third “way” of Islam is jihād, the call to fight and kill the unbelievers. As martyrs would directly go to heaven, Klimovich regarded jihād as “a lottery in which one cannot lose”.

=== Existence of Muhammad ===
In November 1930, Klimovich came up with what he probably believed to be a fatal blow to Islam and at the same time a revolution within Islamic studies. That month he gave a lecture in the Communist Academy (probably in Kazan), asking the provocative question, “Did Muhammad Exist?” This lecture amounted to a wholesale refutation of Islamic historiography on the early Muslim community. According to Klimovich, no contemporary sources on Muhammad's life have come down to us; the earliest known reports and biographies of the prophet, like that of Ibn Isḥāq/Ibn Hishām, were written by Muslim authors of the mid-8th and 9th centuries. By that time, however, the Muslim scholars themselves had no reliable information on Muhammad's life at their disposal; all they had was the Koran, and therefore their biographies and the ḥadīth material is nothing but a late illustration and commentary on the Koran. In fact, by that time the language of the Koran itself was so incomprehensible even to Arabs that the new additional sources were necessary to make sense of it at all. In result, the time gap between Muhammad's alleged lifetime and the first written sources was so huge that we cannot suppose that any of the information given in these sources is authentic. According to Klimovich, also references to Muhammad in Christian sources were anything but convincing. Klimovich concluded that nothing is known for sure about the historical Muhammad, and that it is even likely that he never existed. Quite consequently, Klimovich assumed that the Koran was not Muhammad's work but the product of a whole group of authors. Muhammad was created by later historians as a myth, designed to explain the emergence of the Islamic community out of the Hanif movement. The prophet was an invention to cover up early Islam's character as a social protest movement.

=== During the Stalinist Era ===
During the Stalinist Era and the domination of Feudalism theory, Klimovich understood he had to withdraw from his view that Islam had initially been a progressive social protest movement. The starting point could no longer be the Koran, the Arabic tradition, or the critique of “bourgeois” Orientalism; instead, one had to start with the works of Marx and Engels. In a lecture held at the Communist University of the Toilers of the East in May 1933, 120 Klimovich basically listed up all quotes by Engels on Islam which Ditiakin had already published in 1927, without, however, giving any credit to Ditiakin. As we have seen, Engels remarked that religion was a “fantastic” reflection on life, that Islam was the “reaction of the Bedouins” as well as the “first act of the awakening Arabian national consciousness”, a “return to the old”. Taking these quotes together, Klimovich concluded that Islam had to be classified as reactionary.

Klimovich now contended that Islam resulted from a process of “feudalization” and centralization of the Arabic tribes, which was reflected in the centralization of the religious cults in the Kaaba. Put in these terms, Islam emerged as the “ideology of feudal lords (Russ. feodalov)”, representing exploitation and inequality.

== Feudalism theory ==
This theory remained dominant throughout the Stalinist era and afterward because it confirmed the official Soviet doctrine. The other theories were rejected as "Revisionist" and "Trotskyist" Already in previous years Soviet anti-religious activists in the Muslim peripheries attacked Muslim landowners alongside mullahs, claiming that Islam supported feudal exploitation. In the early 1930s, however, Islam itself started to be regarded as a feudal product. At the same time, the tone of the debates became even more aggressive. One of the earliest contributions to this development was a review essay written by one Kh. Naumov in 1932, which appeared in Revoliutsionnyi Vostok.

Naumov's review essay attacked Evgenii Beliaev, who had recently published a textbook with Russian translations of Western European Orientalists. Naumov attacked Beliaev harshly not only for “popularizing” the achievements of bourgeois Orientalists but also for presenting the three economic environments distinctly, and for adding them up “mechanically”. Instead of being separated, he insisted, “the three systems were distinct parts of a unified economy of Arabia in those days, with the trade regions having a dominant role on the basis of their feudal relations”. Naumov nowhere explained this relationship between trade and feudalism, nor did he provide any sources.

Naumov quoted Engels to the effect that “all religion (…) is nothing but the fantastic reflection in men's minds of those external forces which control their daily live”. This quote alone sufficed him to maintain that “the Koran is the distorted fantastic expression of the reality of those times”. Consequently, it is wrong to regard the Koran as a source for early Islam. Naumov went on to explain that it is also unacceptable to make a distinction between Muslims and non-Muslims, as Beliaev had done when he mentioned that the Muslims of Medina were attacking the caravans of pagan Mecca. Making a distinction between Muslims and non-Muslims, so Naumov, means to take over the position of “missionaries” who sort out the non-believers (as we will see, the accusation that Orientalists become missionaries, that scholarship serves religion, was becoming a convenient and widespread instrument of defamation in the 1930s). Naumov also attacked many other Marxist Orientalists, including Liutsian Klimovich for his view that Islam was a “social revolution” of the “progressive elements of Arabic trade capital”.

Naumov's leveling of Muslims and non-Muslims, his disregard for religion as a special factor, can probably best be characterized as an ultra-leftist position. In general, however, his rejection of the importance of religion and personalities and his deterministic emphasis on materialism can still be linked to the school of M.N. Pokrovskii.

“The centralization of the monetary capital in some Arabian cities, above all in Mecca, the struggle against the ‘colonizers’ [i.e., the Ethiopians and the Persians], the dissolution of natural (economic) relations, and the process of class warfare in general pushed the Arabs with iron inevitability towards the creation of an Arabic state.”

Klimovich embraced the Feudalism theory wholeheartedly and attacked Navshirvanov and Tomara

Klimovich attacked the “trade capitalism theory” of Reisner with similar harshness; to be sure, Reisner had died some years before, but as seen above, his theory had been taken up and modified by Evgenii Beliaev and others.

The change in the general political atmosphere of the country and in Islamic studies in particular prompted many authors to readjust their positions. This produced a weak but unified Soviet theory on Islam that would henceforth be regarded as dogma. In the following years it became impossible to describe Islam in any meaningful manner. The surviving participants in the Soviet discourse on Islam had to subscribe to the dogma that linked Islam to feudalism. At the same time it was carefully avoided to ascribe any content to the term “feudal”, or to explain its relationship with the “trade capitalists”.

== See also ==
- Society of the Godless
