= Mullagali Akhmetzhanovich Yaushev =

Russian trader (1864–1926)

Mullagali Yaushev
- Муллагали Яушев
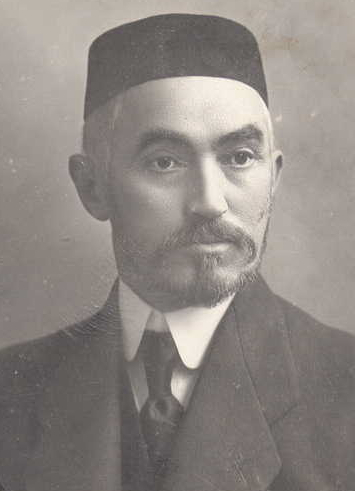
- A portrait of Mullagali Yaushev.
- Born: December 5, 1864; Troitsk, Troitsk Uyezd, Orenburg Governorate
- Died: 1926 (aged 61–62); Tashkent, Uzbek SSR, Soviet Union
- Occupations: Entrepreneur, public figure
- Children: Two sons and six daughters
- Father: Akhmetzhan Gaysich Yaushev
- Relatives: Farid Seiful-Mulyukov (grand-son)
- Awards: Neck Medal for Diligence, in silver, St. Vladimir ribbon

Mullagali Akhmetzhanovich (Gali Akhmetovich) Yaushev (Russian: Муллагали Ахметжанович (Гали Ахметович) Яушев, Tatar: Муллагали Әхмәтҗан (Гаиләхмәт) улы Яушев, Mullağali Əxmətcan (Ğaliəxmət) ulı Yawşev; December 5, 1864 – 1926) was a merchant of the First Guild. He was the head of the "Trading House of the Yaushev Brothers" and an influential member of the Yaushev family merchant dynasty, a famous Volga Tatar trading family.

== Career ==
Yaushev was the younger brother of Abdulvali Akhmetzhanovich Yaushev. After his death in 1906, Yaushev headed the family business. The main business of the Yaushevs was the sale of manufactorial and agricultural goods, including goods produced by themselves.

Under Mullagali Yaushev's leadership, the Trading House of the Yaushev Brothers built several large modern shopping arcades - Troitsk (1911), Chelyabinsk (1913), Tashkent (1915) and Kustanay (1915). The construction of one 4-story passage building in Troitsk cost 300000 rubles, and there were 125 people employed in the building. In 1915, Yaushev was awarded the honorary title of Commerce Advisor.

== Activities outside business ==
=== Political activities ===
Yaushev was the delegate of the Second All-Russian Muslim Congress in January 1906 in St. Petersburg. He was an active participant in the Tatar liberal movement and the Jadid movement. From 1914 to 1917, he was a member of the Troitsk City Council and the Troitsk County Zemstvo Assembly.

=== Charity ===
From 1901 to 1906, Yaushev was an honorary member of the Troitsk Muslim Charity Society. From 1907 to 1917, he was its chairman. In 1901, he was elected treasurer. Yaushev headed the Executive Commission of the Muslim Orphanage. After 1906, Yaushev was made an honorary guardian of the Troitsk Two-year Russian-Tatar school and the Russian 2nd Troitsk City Four-year School. In 1909, he was one of the founders of the Muslim Charitable Society in Kustanay. In 1914, he became one of the founders of the Troitsk Shamrock Society for the Care of Pupils in Primary Schools. In 1914, along with his family, Yaushev founded the Women's Madrasa in Troitsk. He donated 1000 rubles for the construction of the Saint Petersburg Mosque.

== Emigration and return ==
After the October Revolution and the outbreak of the Russian Civil War, Yaushev moved with his family to Vladivostok, and then emigrated first to Harbin, China, and Yokohama, Japan. The family stayed in Yokohama until 1923. With the opportunity to emigrate to the United States coming up, the Yaushevs decided to return to Soviet Russia. After returning, the family lived in poverty in Tashkent, where former Yaushev employees helped them.

Yaushev had two sons and six daughters, but his only notable descendant is his grandson, Farid Seiful-Mulyukov, a Soviet journalist.
