= Yaushev family =

Yaushev Яушевлар Yawşevlar
- Noble family, Business family
- Parent family: Ar begs
- Current region: Russia, Tatarstan, Southern Ural, Kazakhstan
- Etymology: "Descendant of Yaush"
- Origin: Khanate of Kazan
- Founded: 16th century
- Founder: Yaush
- Titles: Morza
- Traditions: Islam in Tatarstan, Jadid

The Yaushev family (Russian: Яушевы, Tatar: Яушевлар, romanized: Yawşevlar) was a Volga Tatar noble family that became incorporated into the Russian nobility.

== Early history ==
The family is a branch of the Ar begs aristocratic clan and descents from Yaush (Russian: Яуш), a nobleman mentioned in chronicles related to the Siege of Kazan in 1552. Descendants of Yaush were Serving Tatars in Russia and were granted Russian noble title and land by Ivan the Terrible. Under Peter the Great the Yaushev family was stripped of nobility for the refusal to convert from Islam to the Russian Orthodox Church. In the subsequent decades, parts of the family restored their title.

== Merchant family ==
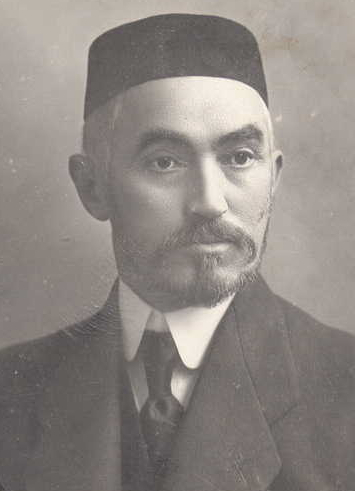
Mullagali Yaushev, member of the Yaushev merchant dynasty

A branch of the larger Yaushev clan became a prominent merchant family in the 19th and early 20th century by trading between Russia and Central Asia. The merchant dynasty was founded in Troitsk in the early 19th century by Gaisa Yaushev (1790–1870). It was later represented by his son Akhmedzhan Yaushev (1818–1875) and gained the largest influence under his grandsons Abdulvali Yaushev (1840–1906) and Mullagali Yaushev (1864–1927). The family firm was known as the Trading House of the Yaushev Brothers (Russian: Торговый дом братьев Яушевых) in the early 20th century.

The Yaushev merchant family owned stores and trading arcades ("passages") in the Southern Ural (Troitsk, Chelyabinsk, Kustanay) and Central Asia (Tashkent), as well as cotton, tea, soap and leather manufactures in what now are Russia and Uzbekistan.

The Yaushevs were sponsors and active members of the liberal Muslim movement in Russia, Jadidism. They financed several Islamic modernist schools and mosques, such as the White Mosque in Kustanay.

After the October Revolution, the property of the Yaushev merchant family was nationalized by the bolsheviks. The family went into exile to Japan, China, the United States and Western Europe. Some members of the family later returned to Soviet Russia.

=== Architecture related to the Yaushev merchant family ===
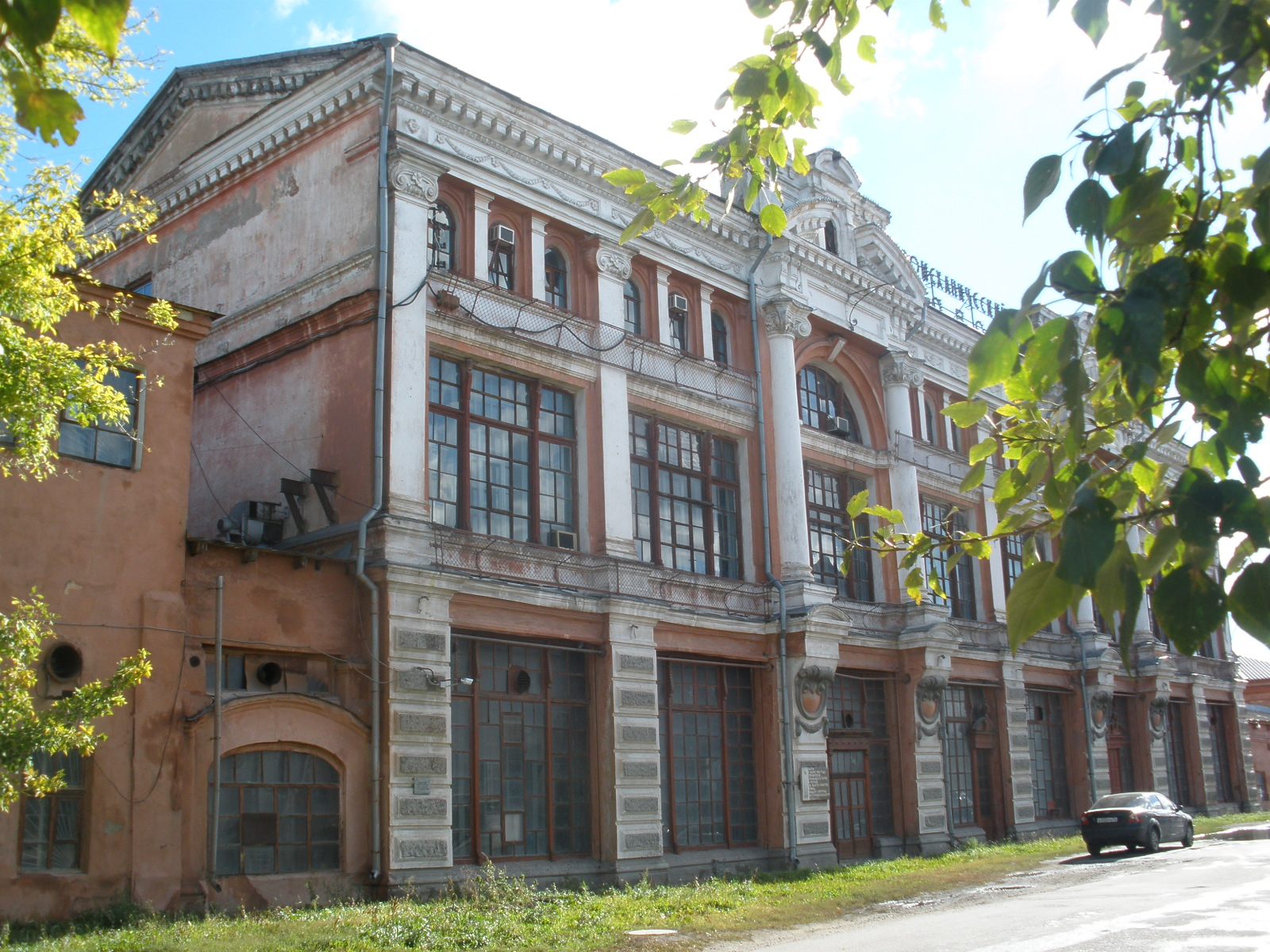
Yaushev trading arcade in Troitsk, built in 1908-1911

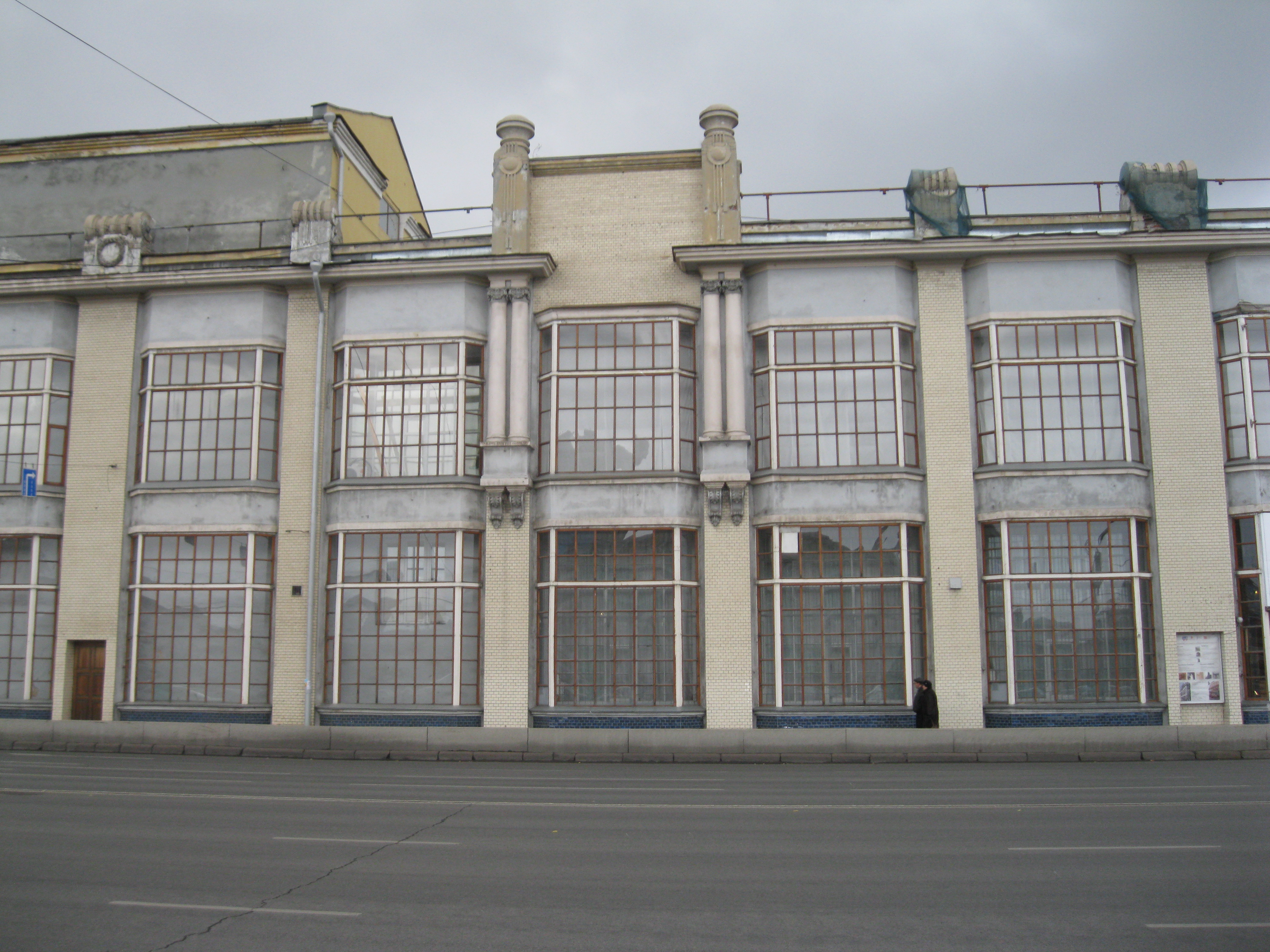
Yaushev trading arcade in Chelyabinsk, built in 1912-1913

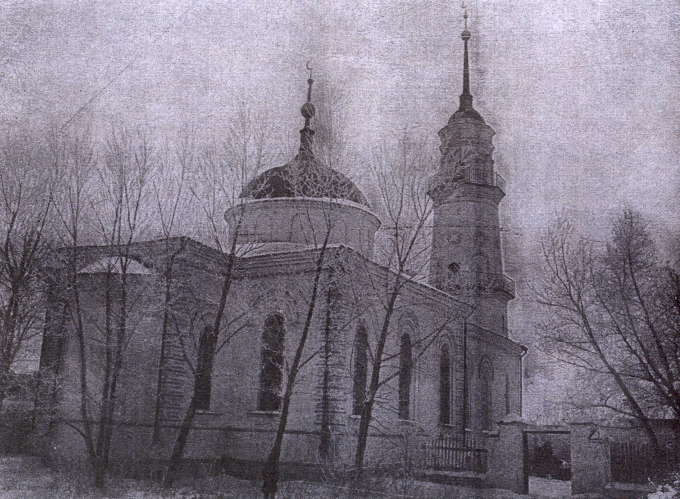
Zaynulla Rasulev Mosque in Troitsk, construction was financed in 1863-1864 by Gaisa Yaushev

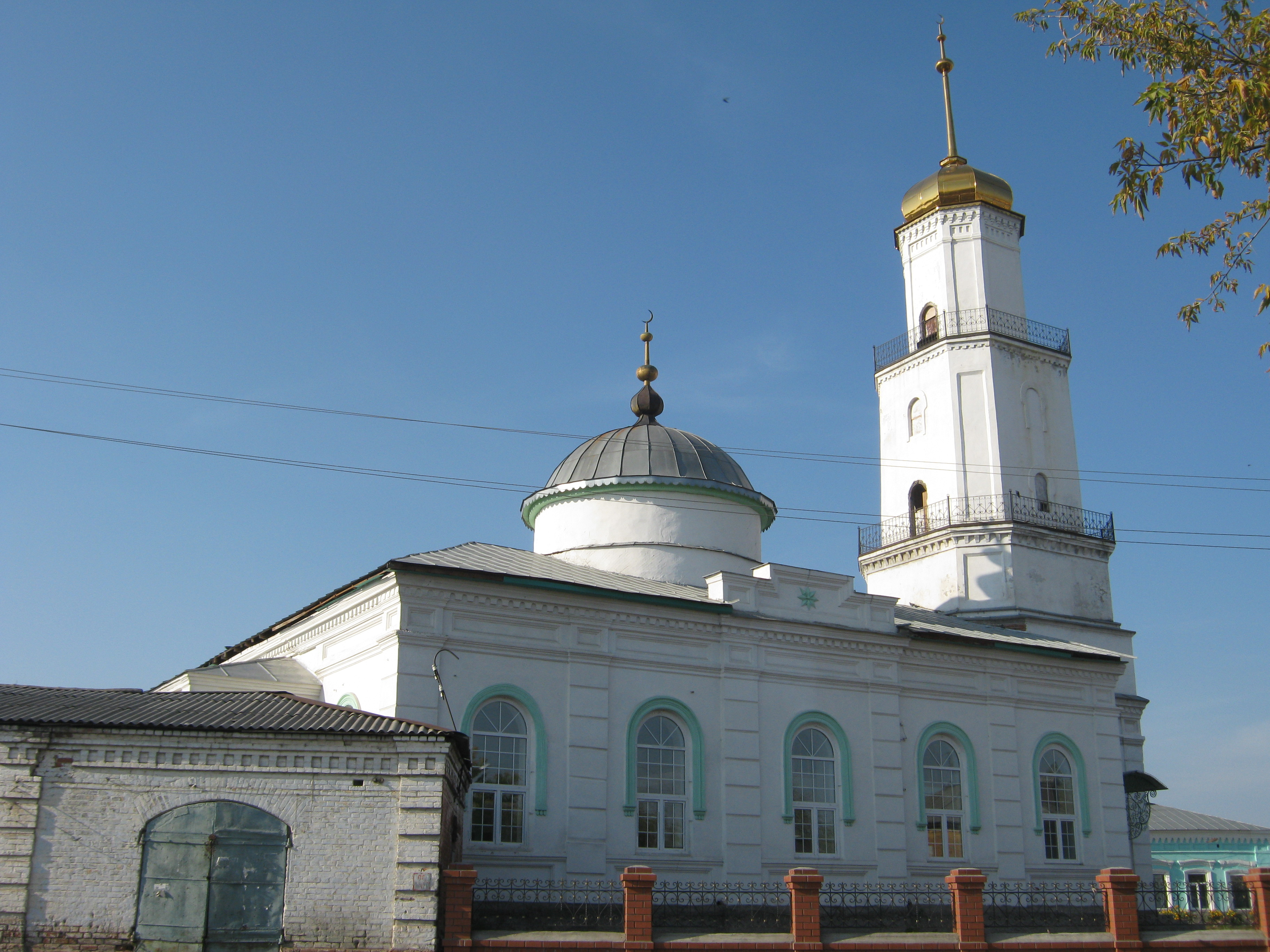
Gataulla Mulla Mosque in Troitsk, construction was financed in 1894–1895 by Abdulvali Yaushev

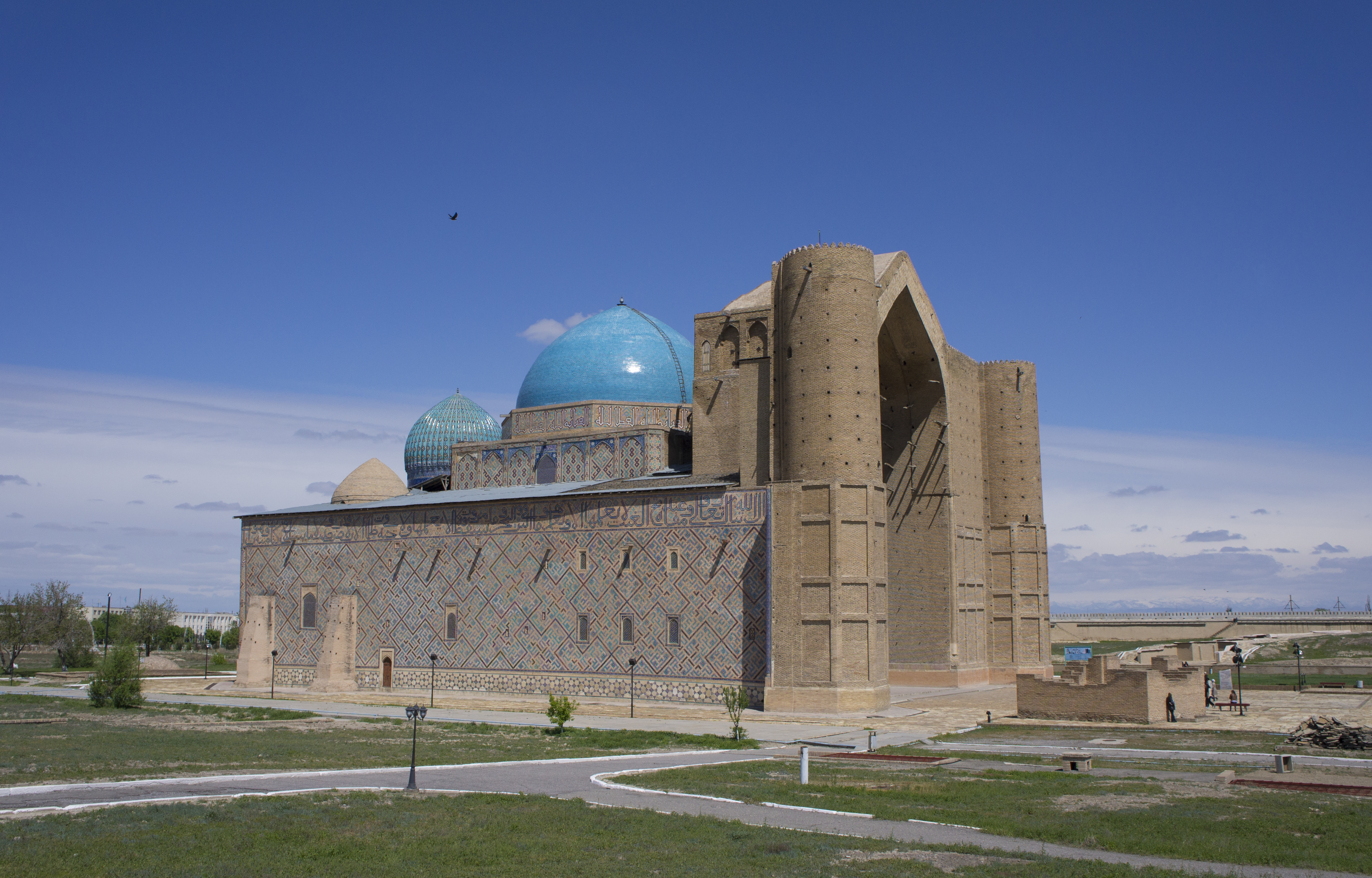
Mausoleum of Khoja Ahmed Yasawi, reparation works financed by the Yaushev family in 1899

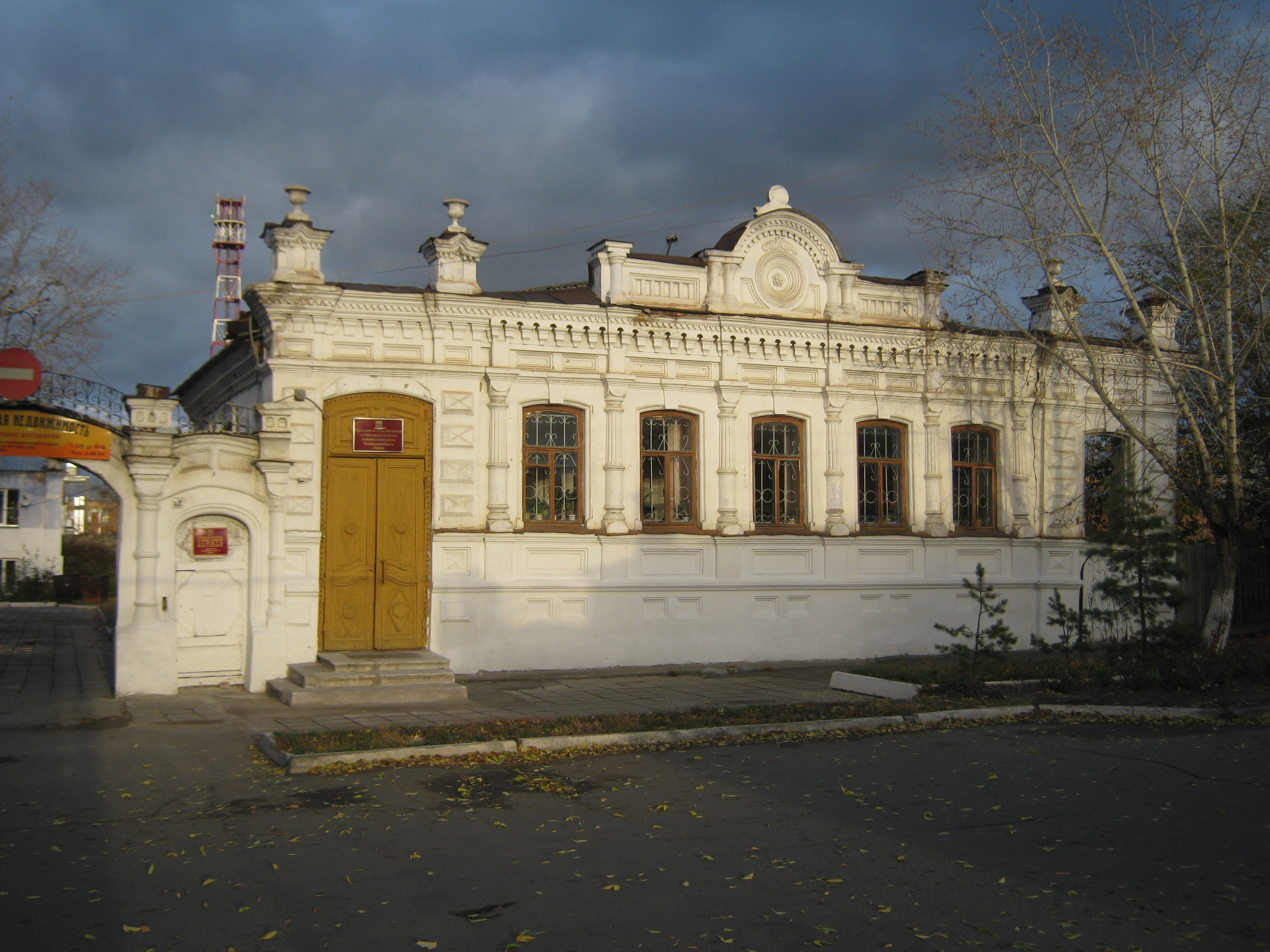
A house belonging to the Yaushev family in Troitsk, Chelyabinsk Oblast

== Muslim cleric family ==
A different branch of the Yaushev family became religious leaders in what is now northern Kazakhstan in the second half of the 19th century and early 20th century. Gabdelbari Yaushev (1814—1894) and his son Gabdelvagap Yaushev (1859—1924) were imams and akhoonds in the city of Petropavlovsk and trustees of the mosque of the Irbit Fair. The family remained in Russia after the revolution and maintained its role as religious leaders in Petropavlovsk during the first years of the Soviet regime.

== Descendants ==
- The Soviet journalist Farid Seiful-Mulyukov was the grandson of the last head of the Yaushev merchant family, Mullagali Yaushev.
- Fatykha Aitova (née Yausheva), the daughter of Abdulvali Yaushev, was the founder of the first women's gymnasium in Kazan in 1916.
- Mukhamedzhan Seralin, Kazakh journalist, founder of the first magazine in Kazakh language, Ay Qap, was a descendant of the Yaushev merchant family from his mother's side. The magazine was initially also sponsored by the Yaushev family.

== Sources ==
- Чайчиц А. Купцы Яушевы. Семейная история. Казань: Татарское книжное издательство, 2020 [Čaičics, A. The Yaushev Merchants: a Family History. Kazan: Tatar Book Publishers, 2020].
