= Sofiya Lisovskaia =

Russian physician

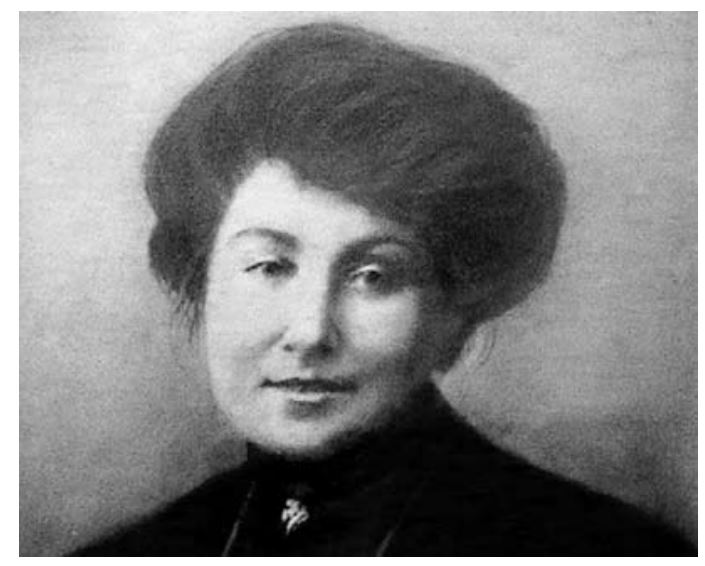
Sofiya Lisovskaia

Sofiya Nikolayevna Lisovskaia (Russian: София Николаевна Лисовская; 1876–1951) was a Russian and Soviet surgeon and physician, known for her prolific research in immunology and urology. She was the first Russian woman Professor of Urology and the founder of the Urology Chair at the First Leningrad Medical Institute (currently, First Pavlov State Medical University of St. Peterburg). She headed the chair for 28 years (1923-1951).

== Early life and education ==
Lisovskaia was born in 1876. She studied at the Petersburg Women's Medical Institute, graduating in 1902 and then earning her medical degree in 1911.

== Career ==
She was a surgeon in the Petersburg Women's Medical Institute Hospital Surgical Clinic from 1904 to 1917. In 1917, Lisovskaia organized the First Leningrad Medical Institute (her alma mater, renamed after the Russian Revolution) the Privatdozent courses on urology at the Chair of operative surgery headed by Professor A.A. Kadyan (1849–1917).

Lisovskaia was the first Russian woman Professor of Urology and the founder of the Urology Chair at the First Leningrad Medical Institute (currently, First Pavlov State Medical University of St. Peterburg). In 1923, her courses were reorganized into an independent Chair that she headed for 28 years (1923–1951) until her death. She may also have been the first academic female urologist anywhere.

Lisovskaia is known for her prolific research in immunology and urology. She published 86 papers throughout her career, including her doctoral thesis on thyroid transplantation, an immunological technique for diagnosing gonorrhea, and applications of classical conditioning to the treatment of enuresis (bladder incontinence). Her book "Триппер и методы борьбы с ним" ("Gonorrhea and the methods of fighting it") was first published in 1926 and had six consecutive editions.

During World War II, Lisovskaia worked in the besieged Leningrad.
