= Nikolay Alekseyevich Belyakov =

Russian medical scientist

- Николай Алексеевич Беляков
- Born: 28 July 1949 (age 77); Sevastopol, Soviet Union
- Education: Omsk Medical Institute
- Known for: Research in pathophysiology, pulmonology, HIV infection and socially significant infectious diseases
- Awards: Honoured Scientist of the Russian Federation
- Scientific career
- Fields: Pathophysiology, clinical physiology, pulmonology, infectious diseases
- Workplaces: First Pavlov State Medical University of St. Petersburg; Saint Petersburg Medical Academy of Postgraduate Education; Saint Petersburg Pasteur Institute

Nikolay Alekseyevich Belyakov (Russian: Николай Алексеевич Беляков; born 28 July 1949), also transliterated as Nikolai Alekseyevich Belyakov, is a Soviet and Russian physician, pathophysiologist and medical scientist. He is a full member of the Russian Academy of Sciences, a former full member of the Russian Academy of Medical Sciences, a doctor of medical sciences and a professor.

== Biography ==
Belyakov was born in Sevastopol on 28 July 1949. In 1972, he graduated from the Omsk Medical Institute. From 1972 to 1975 he was a postgraduate student at the 2nd Moscow Medical Institute named after Nikolay Pirogov. From 1975 to 1980 he worked at the All-Union Research Institute of Pulmonology of the Ministry of Health of the USSR.

In 1985, Belyakov received the degree of Doctor of Medical Sciences. He became a professor in 1989. From 1987 he headed the Department of Clinical Physiology and Functional Diagnostics at the Leningrad Institute for Postgraduate Medical Training. In 1995 he was elected rector of the Saint Petersburg Medical Academy of Postgraduate Education, which he headed until 2007.

From 2007, Belyakov headed the Saint Petersburg Center for AIDS and Infectious Diseases and was involved in work on socially significant infections at the I. I. Dzhanelidze Research Institute of Emergency Medicine and other medical research institutions. Since 2015, he has headed the North-West District Center for AIDS Prevention and Control at the Saint Petersburg Pasteur Institute. Since 2017, he has headed the Department of Socially Significant Infections at the First Pavlov State Medical University of St. Petersburg.

== Scientific work ==
Belyakov's research has dealt with pathological and clinical physiology, experimental pulmonology, HIV infection and other socially significant infectious diseases. The Russian Academy of Sciences lists his research interests as clinical physiology, pathophysiology of respiratory, digestive and circulatory disorders, infectious diseases, HIV, viral hepatitis, tuberculosis, coronavirus infection and comorbid conditions.

The First Pavlov State Medical University describes him as an organizer and head of the Department of Socially Significant Infections and Phthisiopulmonology, with research interests including epidemiology, virology, clinical physiology and health-care organization. The university also credits him as an author, editor or co-author of medical works on HIV infection, comorbid conditions, COVID-19 and postgraduate medical education.

== Academy membership and honours ==
Belyakov was elected a corresponding member of the Russian Academy of Medical Sciences in 1999 and a full member of the Russian Academy of Medical Sciences in 2005. In 2014, he became a full member of the Russian Academy of Sciences.

He received the title of Honoured Scientist of the Russian Federation.

== Selected publications ==
The Russian Academy of Sciences and the Saint Petersburg Branch of the Russian Academy of Sciences list the following among Belyakov's publications:

- Izolirovannoe legkoe [The isolated lung]. Leningrad: Meditsina, 1983.
- Mikroemboliia legkikh [Pulmonary microembolism]. Leningrad: Meditsina, 1986.
- Enterosorbtsiia [Enterosorption]. Arkhangelsk, 1991.
- Nemedikamentoznaia terapiia [Non-drug therapy]. Vols. 1–2. Saint Petersburg: MAPO Publishing House, 2005.
- VICh-meditsina [HIV medicine]. Saint Petersburg, 2010.
- Zhenshchina, rebenok i VICh [Woman, child and HIV]. 2012.
- Personalizirovannaia VICh-meditsina [Personalized HIV medicine]. Saint Petersburg, 2020.
- Evoliutsiia pandemii COVID-19 [Evolution of the COVID-19 pandemic]. Saint Petersburg, 2021.
