= Farid Seiful-Mulyukov =

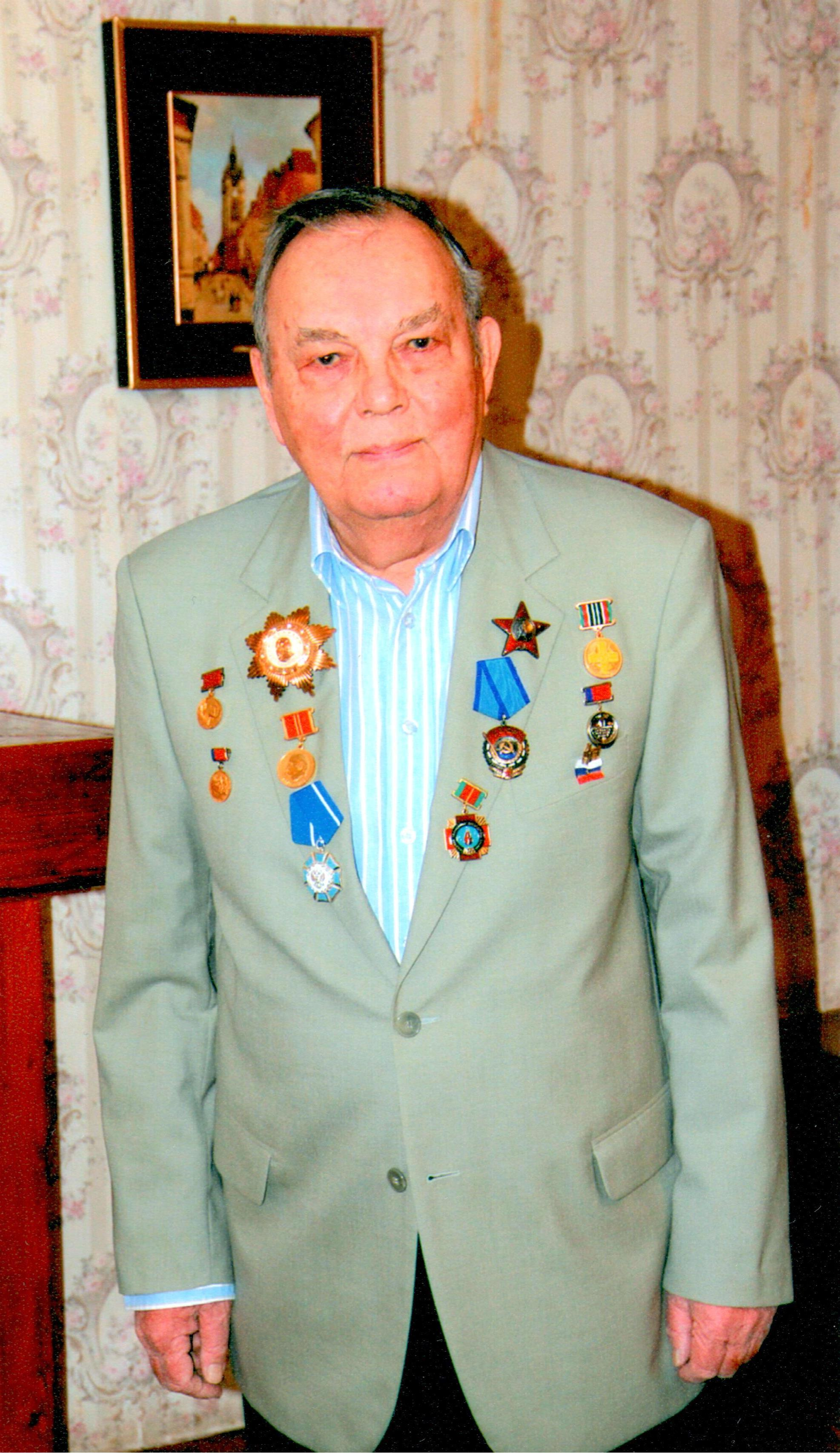
- Seiful-Mulyukov in 2000s
- Born: Farid Mustafevich Seiful-Mulyukov; 19 November 1930; Tashkent, Uzbek SSR, Soviet Union
- Died: 4 June 2016 (aged 85); Moscow, Russia
- Occupations: Journalist, writer, Arabist, television presenter
- Years active: 1964–2016
- Relatives: Mullagali Yaushev (grandfather)

Farid Mustafevich Seiful-Mulyukov (Russian: Фари́д Муста́фьевич Сейфу́ль-Мулю́ков, Tatar: Фәрит Мостафа улы Сәйфелмөлеков; November 19, 1930 – June 4, 2016) was a Soviet and Russian international journalist, writer, orientalist, Arabist and presenter on the Soviet Central Television. He was also the author of numerous reports from around the world on one of Russia's leading television programs In The World Today and for the international Panorama Mulyukov met multiple prominent public figures during his career, including Gamal Abdel Nasser, Hussein of Jordan, Hafez al-Assad, Ruhollah Khomeini and Fidel Castro.

Seiful-Mulyukov was born to Tatar parents. From his mother's side, he belonged to the Yaushev family. His grandfather was Mullagali Yaushev.

== Awards and honors ==
- Order of the Red Banner of Labour (1976)
- Vasilyev Brothers State Prize of the RSFSR (1978)
- USSR State Prize (1981)
- Order of the Red Star (1982)
- Honored Art Worker of the Russian Federation (1995)
- Order of Honour (2010)
