= Fatykha Aitova =

Tatar philanthropist and educator

- Tatar: Фатиха Аитова
- Born: Fatykha Abdulvalieva Yausheva (Russian: Фатиха Абдулвалиевна Яушева); 1866; Troitsk, Russian Empire
- Died: 1942 (aged 75–76); Kazan, Soviet Union

Fatykha Abdulvalieva Aitova (Russian: Фатиха Абдулвалиевна Аитова; Tatar: Фатиха Габделвәли кызы Аитова (Яушева); 1866–1942) was a Tatar philanthropist and educator, and the founder of the first women's gymnasium in Kazan.

== Biography ==
Aitova was born in Troitsk in 1866, the daughter of a wealthy merchant called Abdulvali Yaushev. The Yaushev family was known for their position in the Muslim Jadid reformist movement, and actively sponsored the opening of "new method" ("новометодных") Muslim schools.

In 1887 Aitova married Suleyman Mukhammetzyanovich Aitov, an entrepreneur, politician and public figure from the wealthy Aitov family in Kazan, on the condition he would help her with construction of a school. She became his fifth wife and the couple had five children.

In 1897 Aitova founded an elementary school for girls from poor families in Kazan, entirely from her own funds. The school taught girls needlework, embroidery and knitting, which allowed them to later earn their own income. The school was expanded in 1899, and was able to teach four classes at its peak, but closed after three years.

After the death of her father in 1906, Aitova received a large inheritance. She invested a large portion of these funds into the creation of a new women's school, which opened on 27 August 1909. It was intended for Tatar girls, teaching them according to a Russian curriculum. The school was mainly supported by Aitova's funds, and in 1910 Aitova secured funding from the school commission of the Kazan City Duma. A purpose-built two-story building was constructed for the school, and the uniform of a brown dress with a black and white apron and white shawl with a pink border was introduced for the students. In 1913–14, the school had five classes with about 220 students and nine teachers. The school taught religious studies, Tatar language and literature, arithmetic, geography, history, natural history, calligraphy, drawing, handicrafts and Russian.

Aitova struggled to convert the school into a gymnasium – in 1913–14, five requests to convert the school into a gymnasium were denied by the director of the public schools in Kazan. Aitova turned to the deputy of the Kazan City Duma, Ivan Godnev, for assistance, and through Godnev she was able to meet with the minister of public education and head of the department of public education to make her appeals and receive advice. She and her husband also spent three years travelling around Europe and familiarising themselves with how gymnasiums were run in Prague, Vienna and Berlin. On 4 March 1916, Aitova was given permission to open a private gymnasium for Tatar girls, and the school was formally opened on 29 October 1916.

Aitova's gymnasium taught religious studies, Russian and world history, Russian and world geography, mathematics, algebra, physics, natural sciences, anatomy, physiology, hygiene, pedagogy, Russian and Tatar calligraphy, drawing and needlework. Alongside the Tatar and Russian languages, the gymnasium also taught Arabic, German, English, French and Persian.

On 24 April 1917, Aitova participated in the first All-Russian Congress of Muslim Women, which was held in Kazan.

After the October Revolution, the gymnasium and the rest of Aitova's property was nationalised by the Soviet government, leaving her penniless. Iskhak Rakhmatullin, the chairman of the Council of Ministers at the time, appealed to the government to provide a pension for Aitova, but the request was rejected. The gymnasium was converted to a Tatar secondary school.

During the Russian Civil War, Aitova was evacuated to Omsk and then moved to Baku and Moscow. She returned to Kazan in 1941, and died there in 1942 under the care of her son Yakub's wife Maryam.

== Legacy ==
The women's Tatar language gymnasium no. 12 in Kazan, founded in 1993, is named in honour of Fatykha Aitova.
