= Ivan Aleksandrovich Flerov =

Soviet educationist, journalist, and writer

Ivan Aleksandrovich Flerov (Russian: Иван Александрович Флеров; end of the 19th century – after 1934) was a Soviet educator, journalist, and proponent of atheism.

In 1923, Flerov, in co-authorship with V. Ananiev, published a textbook titled "Morning Dawns: The second book for reading", which included a poem by S. Yesenin "Winter’s Lullaby" ("Poyet zima - aukayet ..."). Flerov was a member of the Central Council of the League of Militant Atheists of the USSR. From 13 November 1928 he worked directly as an educator for children; since 7 October 1929 he was an instructor at the pioneer schools, and after 26 September 1930 he was Head of the School Pioneer Department. From March 1931 to January 1933, Flerov was the editor-in-chief of the magazine for schoolchildren Yunyye bezbozhniki.

== Published works ==
- Наша книжка : Руководство для учителей. / М. И. Королькова, И. А. Флеров. - Москва : Б. и., 1922. - 16 с.;
- Ананьин, Василий Иванович. Флеров, Иван Александрович. Утренние зори : Вторая кн. для чтения в шк. и дома / В.Ананьев и Флеров. - М.; Пг. : Гос. изд-во, 1923. - 284 с.; 27 см. - (Учеб. и учеб. пособия для шк. I и II ступ.)
- Ананьин, Василий Иванович. Флеров, Иван Александрович. Утренние зори : Третья кн. для чтения в шк. и дома : 3 и 4 годы обучения / В.Ананьин и И.Флеров. - М. : Гос. изд-во, 1924. - 407 с.; 27 см. - (Учеб. пособия для труд. шк.).
- Флеров, Иван Александрович. Дома работников просвещения и антирелигиозная пропаганда./ Просвещенец на антирелигиозном фронте : ЦК Союза работников просвещения СССР, Центральный совет Союза безбожников СССР; под ред. А. Коростелева. А. Лукачевского, И. Флерова. - Москва : Работник просвещения; Ленинград : (б. и.), 1929. - 115, (1) с.;
- Флеров, Иван Александрович. Школьная секция при ячейке СБ Рабпроса./ Просвещенец на антирелигиозном фронте : ЦК Союза работников просвещения СССР, Центральный совет Союза безбожников СССР; под ред. А. Коростелева. А. Лукачевского, И. Флерова. - Москва : Работник просвещения; Ленинград : (б. и.), 1929. - 115, (1) с.;
- Флеров, Иван Александрович. Работа просвещенцев среди населения города./ Просвещенец на антирелигиозном фронте : ЦК Союза работников просвещения СССР, Центральный совет Союза безбожников СССР; под ред. А. Коростелева. А. Лукачевского, И. Флерова. - Москва : Работник просвещения; Ленинград : (б. и.), 1929. - 115, (1) с.;
- Флеров, Иван Александрович. Мы - безбожники! : Литературно-художественный сборник для громкого чтения и рассказывания в школах и пионер-отрядах / Составил И. А. Флеров; Центр. совет союзов безбожников СССР. - Москва : Безбожник, 1929 (Ленинград : тип. "Красной газеты" им. Володарского). - 344 с. : заставки, концовки; 23х15 см; Обложка: П. К[езеньян];
- Флеров, Иван Александрович. Воинствующие безбожники в школе / И. Флеров. - Москва; Ленинград : Молодая гвардия, 1930 (М. : типо-лит. "Рабочий ленинец"). - 32 с.; 17х13 см. - (Библиотека школьника-активиста).
- В помощь обществоведу-антирелигиознику : Сборник сост. П. Кульчицким, А. Лызловым и А. Пашковской / Под ред. И. А. Флерова. Вып. 1-2; Центр. совет Союза воинствующих безбожников СССР. - Москва; Ленинград : Моск. рабочий, 1931. - 2 т.; 25 см. Вып. 1: История классовой борьбы в Царской России и религия. - 1931. - 122 с.
- В помощь обществоведу-антирелигиознику : Сборник сост. П. Кульчицким, А. Лызловым и А. Пашковской / Под ред. И. А. Флерова. Вып. 1-2; Центр. совет Союза воинствующих безбожников СССР. - Москва; Ленинград : Моск. рабочий, 1931. - 2 т.; 25 см. Вып. 2: Борьба за коммунизм и религия [Текст]. - 1931. - 158 с.
- Флеров, Иван Александрович. Религия, семья и дети / И. Флеров; Центр. совет Союза воинств. безбожников СССР. - Москва : Безбожник, 1931 (тип. "Гудок"). - 24 с.;
- Флеров, Иван Александрович. Мы - безбожники : Сборник для школ / Составил И. А. Флеров; Обл. П. Н. Староносова, рис. В. И. Сайчук, Е. Г. Соколова, А. А. Шахова, В. В. Щеглова; Центр. совет Союза воинств. безбожников СССР. - Москва : Огиз - Гос. антирелигиозное изд-во, 1932 (13 тип. Огиза). - 368 с. : ил.;
- Флеров, Иван Александрович. Ми - безбожникъяс : школаъяслы сб / лосьодис И. А. Фљоров; комиодiсны Г. Федоров и Т. Ветошкин. - Сыктывкар : Комигиз, 1932. - 340 с.;
- Флеров, Иван Александрович. Воинствующие безбожники в школе : Содержание, форты и методы антирелигиозной массовой работы школы / И. А. Флеров; Центр. совет Союза воинствующих безбожников СССР. - Москва : Гос. антирелигиозное изд-во, 1933. - 38 с.;
- Флеров, Иван Александрович. Воинствующие безбожники в школе : Содержание, формы и методы антирелигиозной масс. работы школы / И. А. Флеров; Центр. совет Союза Воинств. безбожников СССР. - Москва : Гаиз, 1933 (тип. "Гудок"). - Обл., 38, [2] с.;
- Союз воинствующих безбожников CCCР. Центральный совет. За живые формы антирелигиозной массовой работы среди детей / Под ред. И. А. Флерова; Обл.: Е. И. Соколов. - Москва : Гаиз, 1933 (18 тип. треста "Полиграфкнига"). - 64 с.;
- Флеров, Иван Александрович. Методика антирелигиозного воспитания в связи с учебно-программной работой начальной школы / И. А. Флеров; Центр. заоч. антирелигиозный ин-т НКП РСФСР. - Москва : Гаиз, 1934 (17 фабр. нац. книги треста "Полиграфкнига"). - Обл., 88 с.;
- Флеров, Иван Александрович. ДРП и антирелигиозная пропаганда. / Просвещенец на антирелигиозном фронте [Текст] : ЦК Союза работников просвещения СССР, Центральный совет Союза безбожников СССР; под ред. А. Коростелева. А. Лукачевского, И. Флерова. - Москва : Работник просвещения; Ленинград : [б. и.], 1929. - 115, [1] с.; 24 см.
- Флеров, Иван Александрович. Работа просвещенцев среди населения города. / Просвещенец на антирелигиозном фронте [Текст] : ЦК Союза работников просвещения СССР, Центральный совет Союза безбожников СССР; под ред. А. Коростелева. А. Лукачевского, И. Флерова. - Москва : Работник просвещения; Ленинград : [б. и.], 1929. - 115, [1] с.; 24 см.
- Флеров, Иван Александрович. Школьная секция при ячейке СБ просвещенцев. / Просвещенец на антирелигиозном фронте [Текст] : ЦК Союза работников просвещения СССР, Центральный совет Союза безбожников СССР; под ред. А. Коростелева. А. Лукачевского, И. Флерова. - Москва : Работник просвещения; Ленинград : [б. и.], 1929. - 115, [1] с.; 24 см.
