= Ar begs =

Ar begs (Russian: Арские князья, "Arsk princes", later "Vyatka princes", Karinsk princes) was a formation of Noqrat Tatars' nobility serving Russian Tsars in 16th–17th century. In 14th–15th centuries they were rulers of semi-independent duchy with the capital city of Arsk. After the annexation of Vyatka by Russia, the Arsk princes were granted lands in the basins of Cheptsa, Izh, Vyatka rivers, in the modern Udmurtia. At the first time, their lands were under Kazan Khanate's and later under Russian influence. Begs also participated in wars for Udmurtia between Kazan and Tsardom of Russia.

Several Russian noble families descended from the Ar begs include the Devetyarov, Kasimov, Yaushev and others.

== Sources ==
- Gallyam, Rashid Gabdelfartovich (2010). "Летописные "арские князья" XIV-XVII вв.: политический, этимологический и этнический аспекты" ['Arsky Princes' of 14th-17th Centuries in the Chronicles: Political, Etymological and Ethnic Aspects]. Medieval Turkic-Tatar States (in Russian). 2. Kazan: 141–143.
