= First Pavlov State Medical University of St. Petersburg =

Medical school in Saint Petersburg, Russia

Coordinates: 59.9667°N 30.3167°E

- Первый Санкт-Петербургский государственный медицинский университет имени академика И. П. Павлова
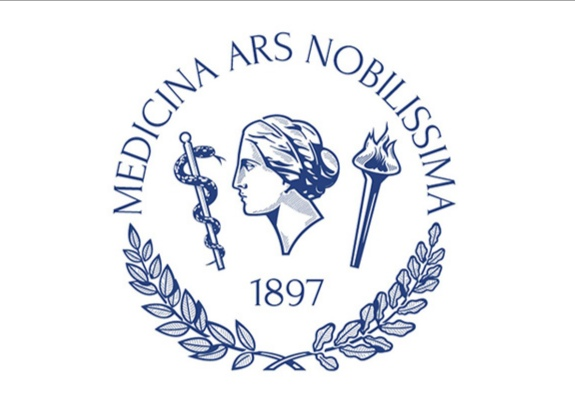
- Motto: Medicina ars nobilissima!
- Type: University
- Established: 1897
- Rector: Сергей Фёдорович Багненко
- Director: Dmitry Lioznov
- Location: St. Petersburg, Russia
- Campus: Urban
- Website: www.1spbgmu.ru
- Building details
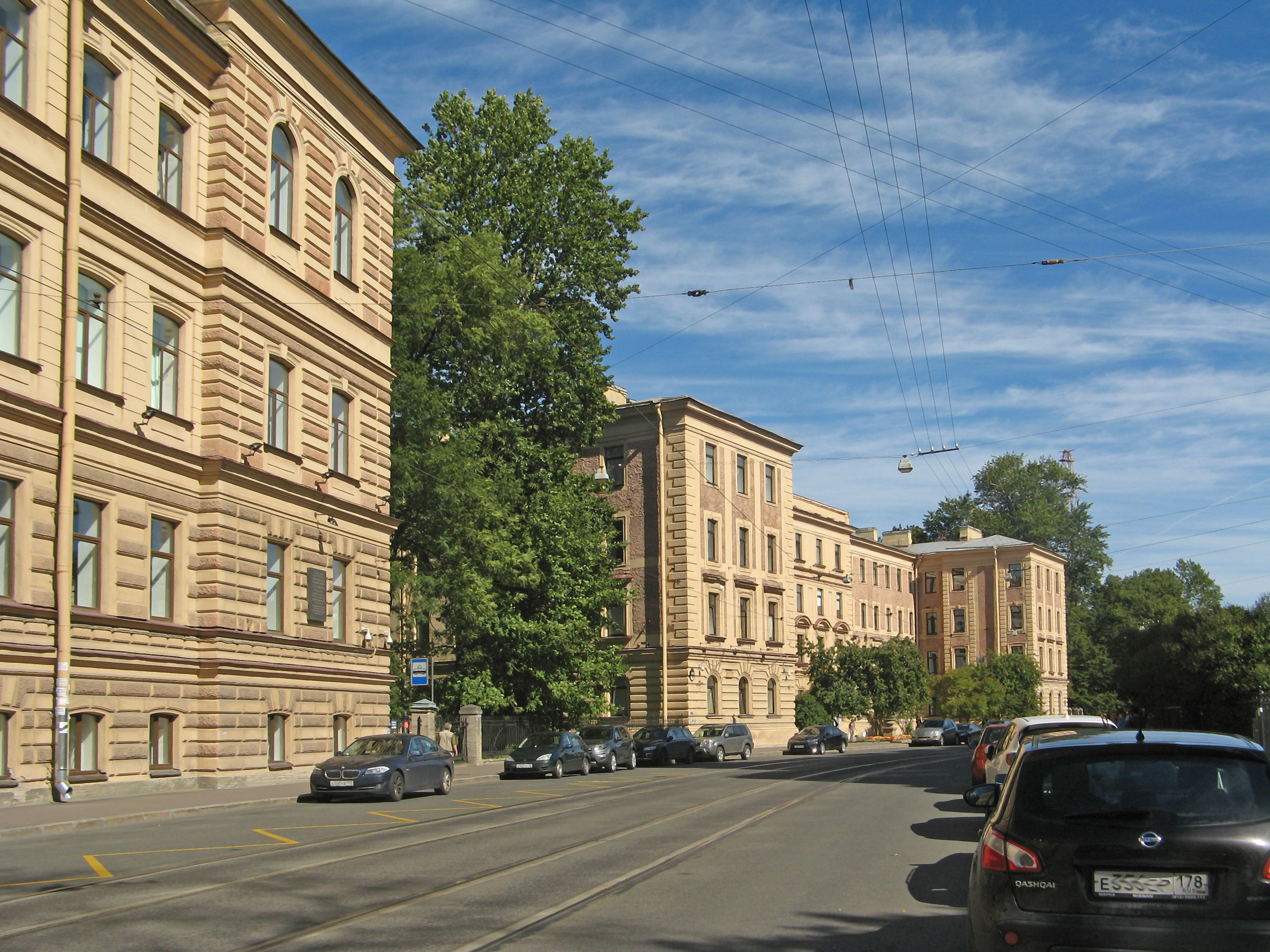

The Pavlov First Saint Petersburg State Medical University (Russian: Первый Санкт-Петербургский государственный медицинский университет имени академика И. П. Павлова, ПСПбГМУ им. акад. И. П. Павлова) is a medical school located in St. Petersburg.

== History ==
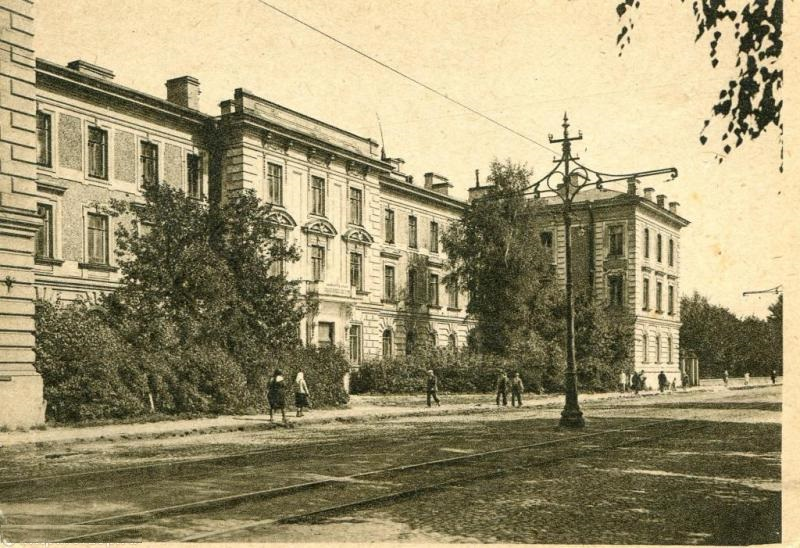
University in 1903

The Pavlov First Saint Petersburg State Medical University was founded in September 1897 as the Medical Institute for Women. Money from the family of Lydia Shanyavskaya, a women's rights activist, provided the financial resources to establish the institute. Marta Helena Nobel-Oleinikoff, an alumna of the institute and a niece of Alfred Nobel, also made a big donation in the initial years.

The University has changed names several times since then. It became the Women’s Medical Institute of St. Petersburg in 1918 and renamed as First Medical Institute of Leningrad in 1924. It was again renamed in 1936, in honour of Nobel Prize winner Ivan Pavlov.

In 1994 the institute was upgraded to a medical university and inaugurated as Pavlov Saint Petersburg State Medical University.

During the interwar years, the Institute of Chemistry and Pharmacy, and Institute of Pediatrics were established as independent units.

== Research ==
Then, Women's Medical Institute, established the second neurology-related department in the country in 1900 under the direction of Vladimir Bekhterev, who headed the Department of Nervous and Mental Diseases until 1913. It was then divided into departments of psychiatry and neurology. Bekhterev's student M.P. Nikitin took charge of the latter from 1913 to 1937.

Pavlov First Saint Petersburg State Medical University houses a number of research institutes:

- Nephrology Research Institute
- Research Institute of Pulmonology
- Raisa Gorbacheva Memorial Research Institute of Children's Oncology, Hematology and Transplantation
- Maxillo-facial Surgery and Dentistry Research Institute
- Valdman Institute of Pharmacology
- Heart and Vascular Research Institute
- Regional Research Centre of Neurobiology and Psychopharmacology
- Scientific and Methodological Center for Molecular Medicine Russian Federation
- Centre of early phases of clinical trials

=== Faculties ===
- Faculty of Medicine
- Faculty of Dentistry
- Faculty of Sports Medicine
- Faculty of Adapted Physical Education
- Faculty of Pediatrics
- Faculty of Clinical Psychology
- Faculty for International student
- Faculty of Graduate Education in Nursing
- Institute of Nursing
- Faculty of Postgraduate Education
- Faculty of Pre-University Course

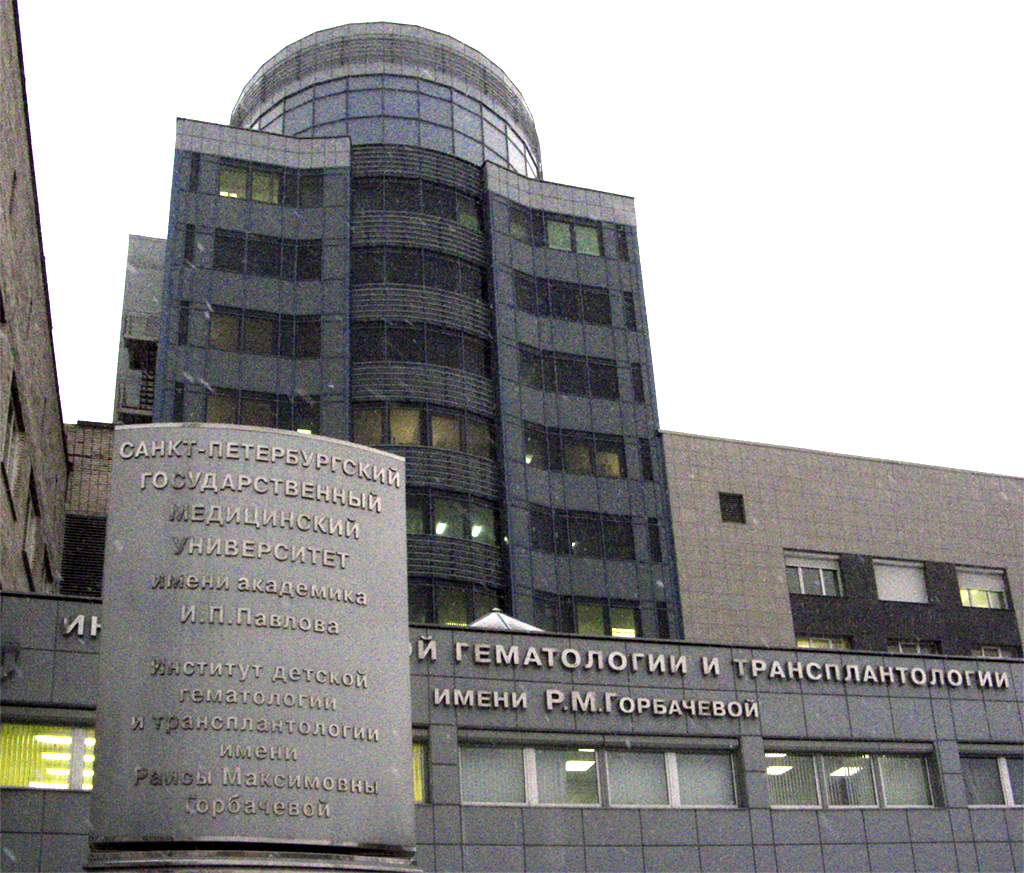
Institute of Hematology and Transplantation at the University

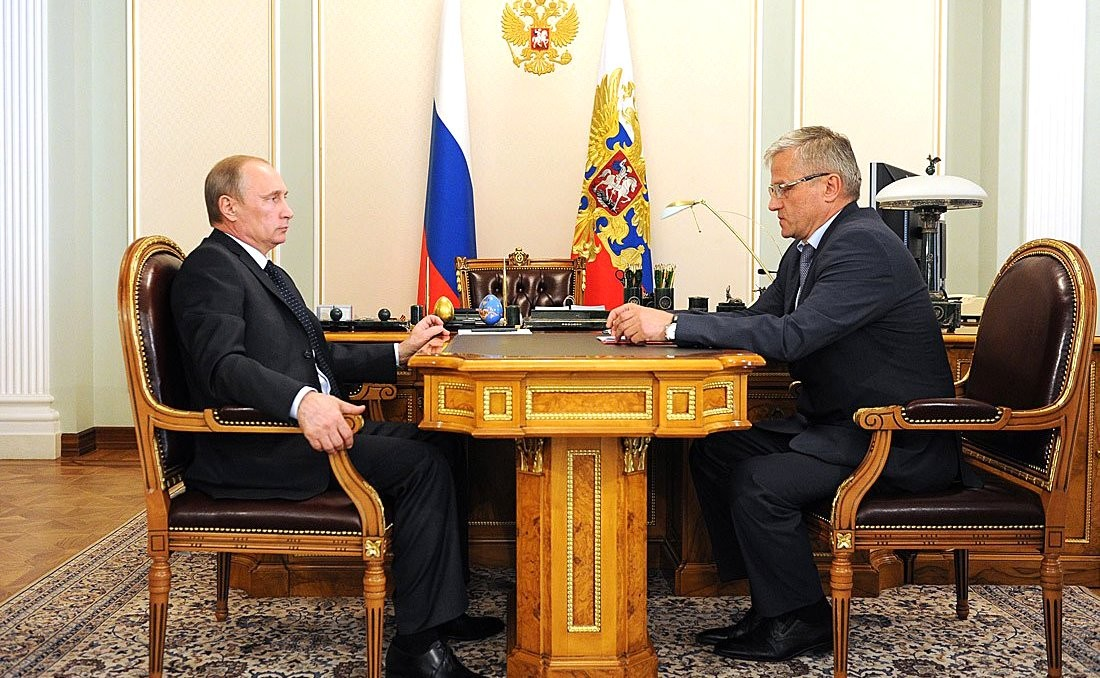
Rector of the University Sergey Bagnenko with Russian President Vladimir Putin

== Notable people ==
=== Faculty ===
- Danylo Zabolotny (1866-1922) - pioneer in microbiology
- Nikolay Alekseyevich Belyakov - professor and head of the Department of Socially Significant Infections and Phthisiopulmonology.

=== Alumni ===
- Pyotr Anokhin (1898-1974), biologist and physiologist
- Natalia Bekhtereva (1924-2008), neuroscientist and psychologist
- Marta Helena Nobel-Oleinikoff (1881-1973), physician and philanthropist
- Alexander Rosenbaum doctor, poet, composer, singer and actor
- Yelena Bonner (1923-2011), human rights activist
- Vasily Aksyonov (1932-2009), novelist
- Ilya Averbakh (1934-1986), film director, screenwriter
- Sofiya Lisovskaia, Russian urologist
- Tumani Corrah, Gambian clinician scientist
- Olha Kosach-Kryvyniuk (1877-1945), Ukrainian physician, writer, and translator
- Gulsum Asfendiyarova (1880-1937), one of the first Kazakh woman medical doctors
- Manto Tshabalala-Msimang, former heath minister of South Africa

== See also ==
- List of higher education and academic institutions in Saint Petersburg
