= All-Russian Congress of Muslim Women =

Islamic congress in Russia

The All-Russian Congress of Muslim Women, held from 24 to 27 April 1917, in Kazan, was a significant forum of Muslim women following the February Revolution in Russia. It brought together 72 delegates and 300 spectators from across the former Russian Empire, including regions like Crimea, the Caucasus, Turkestan, Lithuania, and Siberia. The congress served as preparation for the All-Russian Muslim Congress, which took place a month later in Moscow.

Participants included community leaders, prominent teachers, university students and graduates, as well as working women. Among notable attendees were Xädiçä Yamaşeva, Salima Yakubova, Zahidä Bornaşeva, Ilhamiya Tuktarova, Amina Mukhitdinova, Fatykha Aitova, and Gulsum Asfendiyarova.

The Congress was inaugurated by its chairwoman, Xädiçä Yamaşeva, who declared,

Previously, the state forbade us from addressing our disenfranchised and oppressed status. Now, with the fall of the former regime, the revolution has given us freedom. On behalf of the Central Bureau [of Russian Muslims], I want to share this joy with you and extend my heartfelt congratulations to the congress…

The resolutions and decrees adopted at the Congress marked the beginning of the process of liberating Muslim women and changing their social status in both society and the family. One of the most significant resolutions was “On the Equality of Men and Women in Islam,” which included three key points:

1. According to Sharia, men and women are equal.
2. According to Sharia, women have the right to participate in political and social activities. Therefore, based on Sharia, women can participate in elections.
3. There is no prescription in Sharia for women to wear hijabs or cover their faces.

Regarding family and marriage relations, articles were adopted that prohibited polygamy, affirmed the right of women to divorce, and required the personal presence of both the bride and the groom at the marriage ceremony.
