= E. A. Belyaev =

- Born: 1895
- Died: 1964

Philosophical work
- Era: Medieval era

E. A. Belyaev (Russian: Евге́ний Алекса́ндрович Беля́ев, Evgenii Aleksandrovich Belyaev) (1895–1964) was an Islamic scholar and a prominent Soviet Islamist and member of the Institute of Asian Peoples of the Academy of Sciences of the USSR.

== Works ==
- Arabs, Islam and the Arab Caliphate in the Early Middle Ages

== See also ==
- List of Islamic scholars
