= Order of the Republic (Gambia) =

Highest state order of The Gambia

The Order of the Republic of The Gambia is the highest state order of The Gambia. The incumbent President of the Gambia is the Grand Master of the Order.

The Order of the Republic of The Gambia was created by the government under President Sir Dawda Jawara as a replacement for one of the honours in the British honours system, which was last conferred in the 1970 New Year Honours, the last one under the Gambian monarchy (1965-70).

== Notable recipients ==
=== Grand Commanders ===
- Elizabeth II
- Muammar Gaddafi (2009)
- Chiang Kai-shek (1972)

=== Commanders ===
- Chris Alli
- Hassan Bubacar Jallow

== Gallery ==
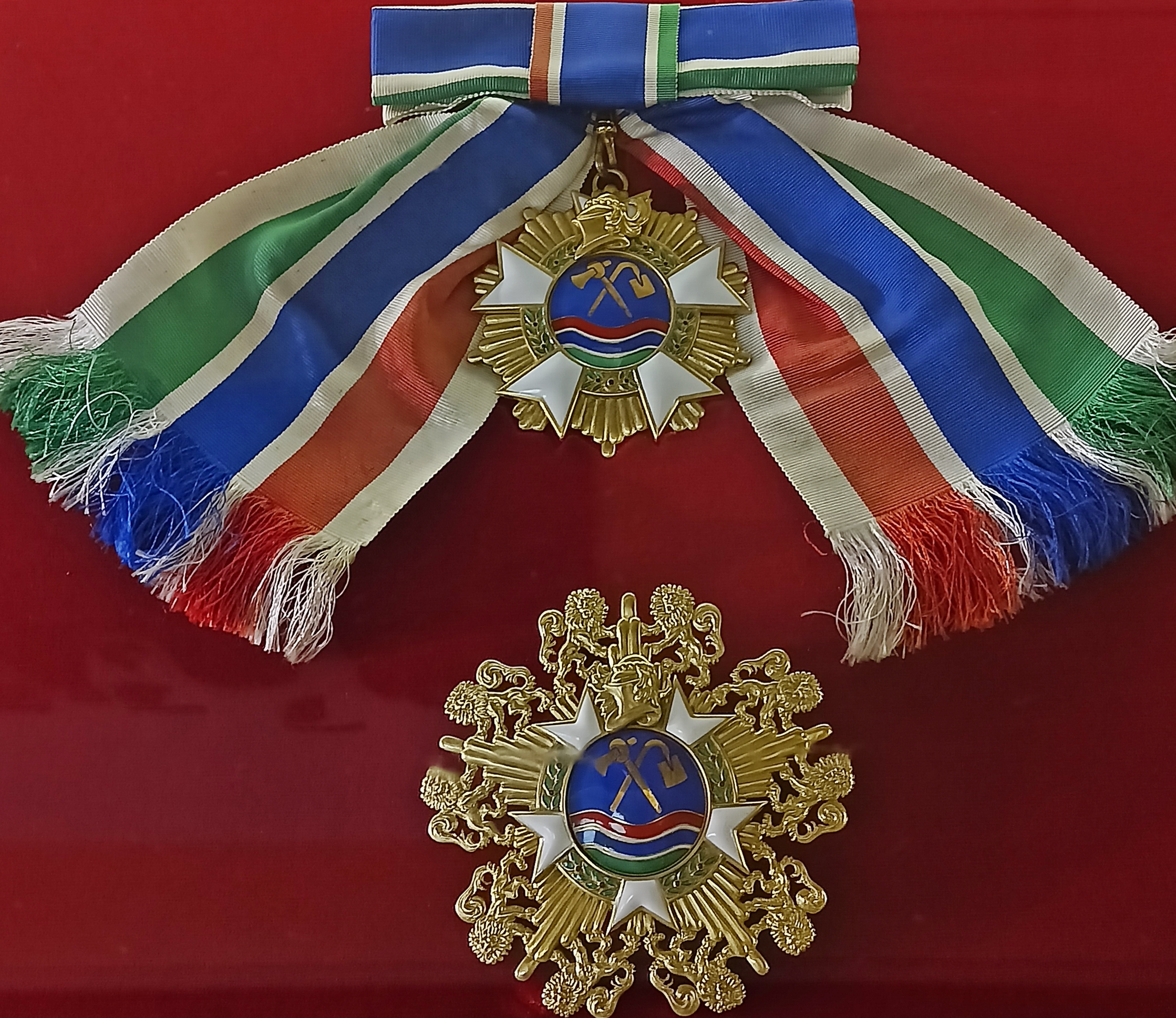
Insignia of the Grand Commander of the Order of the Republic of The Gambia, awarded to Chiang Kai-shek in 1972, on display at Chiang Kai-shek Memorial Hall in 2023.
