= Sanjar Asfendiyarov =

Kazakh scholar and politician

Sanjar Dzhafarovich Asfendiyarov (Russian: Санджар Джафарович Асфендиаров; 20 October 1889 – 25 February 1938) was a Kazakh scholar and politician, killed during the Great Purge.

== Early career ==
Asfendiyarov, a descendant of Abul Khair Khan, was born in Tashkent, where his father worked as a military translator. Asfendiyarov graduated in 1912 from the St Petersburg Military Medical Academy. Serving as a medical doctor early in the war with Germany, he was taken prisoner in East Prussia in December 1914, and held in various concentration camps until December 1915, when he was able to return to St Petersburg via Sweden, during a prisoner exchange organised by the International Red Cross. After the February Revolution in 1917, he was elected to the Bukhara regional soviet of workers' and soldiers' delegates. In 1918, he served with the Red Army in the war against the Emir of Bukhara. He joined the Communist Party (Bolsheviks) in 1919.

In 1919–1925, Asfendiyarov worked in the Turkestan Autonomous Soviet Socialist Republic, as People's Commissar for Health, 1919–20, and 1923–24; and for Agriculture, 1921–22, and as a secretary of the Central Committee of the Turkestan Communist Party, and a member of the Central Asian bureau of the All-Russian Communist Party.

== Academic career ==
In 1927–1928 Asfendiyarov was Director of the N.N. Narymanov institute of Oriental studies, in Moscow, in 1927–28, and simultaneously a Professor of Moscow State University.

From 1928, he was based in Kazakhstan, where he founded the Kazakh teacher training college (now the Abay Kazakh National Pedagogical University), and was the first rector of Almaty Medical Institute (1931–1933), now S.F Asfendiyarov Kazakh National Medical University, which is named after him. He did a lot of work on the prevention of infectious diseases, rendering free medical care to the population of the republic, and helped with the eradication of tuberculosis, smallpox, plague and skin diseases.

== Arrest and execution ==
Asfendiyarov was arrested in Moscow on August 22, 1937 and was expelled from the Communist Party on September 27, as a "counter-revolutionary nationalist". He was moved to Almaty where he was interned in a temporary insulator. He was sentenced to death by shooting on February 25, 1938.

== Rehabilitation ==
Asfendiyarov was rehabilitated by a decision of the USSR Supreme Court on May 26, 1958. In 1962, Naberezhnaya Street, in Almaty, was renamed S. Asfendiyarov Street. On 11 January 1989, the government of the Kazakhstan Republic renamed the Almaty Medical Institute after him.

== Published works ==
S. Asfendiyarov, History of Kazakhstan (1935) S. Asfendiyarov, The reasons for the founding of Islam (Samarkand, Ashkent, 1928) S. Asfendiyarov and P. A. Kunte, The Past of Kazakhstan in Sources and Materials in two volumes (1935–1936) S. Asfendiyarov, National Liberation Revolt of 1916 in Kazakhstan (monograph, 1936)

Sanzhar Asfendiyarov was fluent in Russian, English, French, Latin languages and languages of eastern nations.
