= Alexander Vvedensky =

Alexander Vvedensky may refer to:

- Alexander Vvedensky (1870–1920), Imperial Russian army officer and participant of White movement, executed by Bolsheviks in 1920
- Alexander Vvedensky (poet) (1904–1941), Russian poet
- Alexander Vvedensky (religious leader) (1889–1946), one of the leaders of the Living Church movement

== See also ==
- Vvedensky (surname)
