= Union of the Communities of the Ancient Apostolic Church =

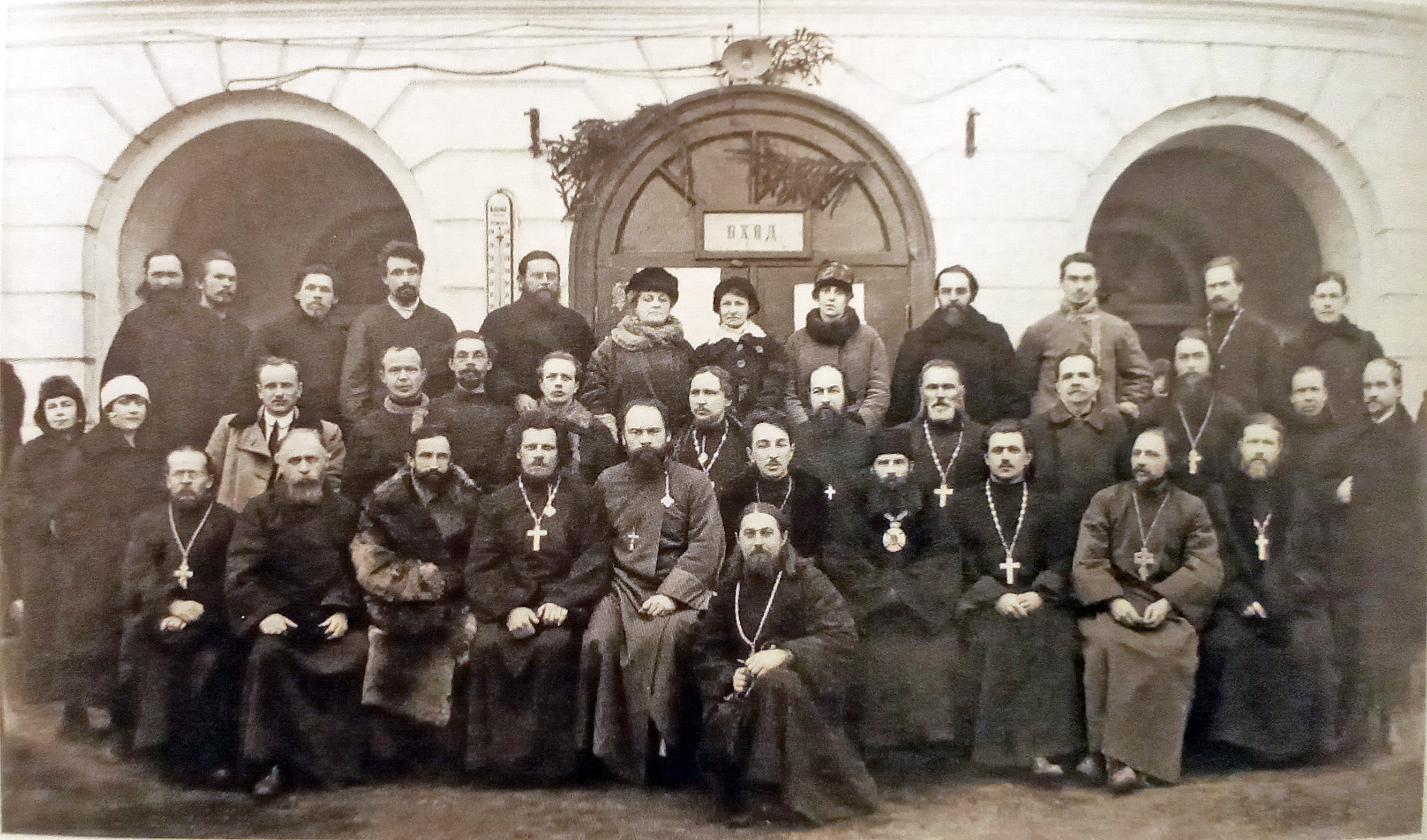
Participants of the All-Russian Congress of SODATs. Moscow, March 15, 1923

Union of the Communities of the Ancient Apostolic Church (Russian: Союз Общин Древле-Апостольской Церкви, officially abbreviated as SODATs, Russian: СОДАЦ) was short-lived Renovationist group, headed by Аrchpriest (Archbishop since May 1923) Alexander Vvedensky. It was founded in October 1922 by archpriest Alexander Vvedensky and layman Alexander Novikov, who were dissatisfied with low moral standard and purposes of the "Living Church", mainly focused on advocating the interests of married clergy. SODATs During spring 1923 the SODATs held two congresses of his supporters and took an active part in the renovationist local council. It was abolished in accordance with the Renovationist authorities of August 8, 1923, who were pushed to this by the Soviet power, who were interested in the unity of Renovationism for fighting against "Tikhonite" Church. Although SODATs members fully joined the synod-headed Renovationism, its radical reform program was not implemented.

== History ==
The background of the appearance of the SODATs dates back to the congress of the "Living Church", which took place on August 6–17, 1922. At this congress, according to the report of Evgeny Tuchkov, there appeared three trends in Renovationism: 1) supporters of Vladimir Krasnitsky, 2) supporters of Antonin (Granovsky) and "the third trend, to the left of the Krasnitsky group, which stands for the exclusion of bishops from the governance and demands an unceremonious attitude towards them". Alexander Novikov, a layman, became the leader of this "trend", which became known as the "Left Wing" (Russian: Левое крыло) or "Left Current" (Russian: Левое течение) or "Left Group" (Russian: Левая группа) of the "Living Church". Vladimir Krasnitsky noted on October 3, 1922, that Novikov often voted against the proposals of the ["Living Church"] Committee at the meetings of the Supereme Church Administration, supporting the Antonin Granovsky-led "Union for the Church Revival" hostile to Krasnitsky. The "Left Current" was supposed to reconcile both renovationist groups in the Supreme Church Administration. Novikov also developed his own program, which did not coincide with Krasnitsky's program, which he published in the newspaper "Nauka i Religiya". As a result, Alexander Novikov was expelled from the "Living Church" on October 3, 1922, at the suggestion of Krasnitsky. As a result, the "Left Group" becomes independent. This association received the support of the GPU, who in a directive to the heads of the it's provincial departments dated October 4, 1922, wrote: "To give tasks to the informant priests who are part of the Living Church group so that they form the left wing of the group". On October 11, 1922, "Left group" published its program in the Pravda, an official newspaper of the Communist Party.

Alexander Vvedensky unites with the "Left Group", forming the "Union of Communities of the Ancient Apostolic Church", as reported by the newspaper "Nauka i Religiya" on October 19, 1922. As Anatoly Krasnov-Levitin and Vadim Shavrov noted, Vvedensky was attracted to this group by refinemence, lack of inertia, and lack of "sacerdotal element," as he later expressed it. In November of the same year, the Moscow and Petrograd Renovationists joined the SODATs, who departed from the Krasnitsky's "Living Church". According to Krasnov-Levitin and Vadim Shavrov, "The Union begins to grow like a snowball, by the end of the year its branches are available in all dioceses. It has several magazines at his disposal, it surpasses the Living Church group in terms of the number of members — from a small faction consisting of 10 people, it turns over the course of two months into a powerful church party headed by the most popular figure of the Renovationist movement." At the same time, according to Krasnov-Levitin and Shavrov, the popularity of SODATs was due "not so much to the special sympathies that it arouses in the clergy, but to the disgust that the "Living Church" evokes in everyone. The clergy and laity cling to SODATs, seeing in him a lesser evil compared to the "Living Church" members".

Despite the numerical superiority over the "Living Church", SODATs could not oust it from the leadership of Renovationism, since "Krasnitsky managed to hold a number of his positions in the capital and province thanks to strict centralization, organization and iron discipline, which unites all his supporters. SODATs, on the contrary, has always been a loose Intelligentsia-based organization with weak ties between members, an uncertain program, and an ideological leader at the head who was completely incapable of administrative leadership." Alexander Vvedensky appealed to the Supreme Church Administration with a request to "give them a bishop." The head of the Living Church, Vladimir Krasnitsky, imposed his loyal supporter John Albinsky to SODATs, but according to Krasnov-Levitin and Shavrov: "It is unlikely that the archbishop [John] justified his hopes: he was the same colorless figure here as in the Living Church. All his "activities" were limited to the fact that he signed various documents and celebrated molebens before the opening of meetings". By January 1923, the Central Committee of SODATs was organized at the Trinity metochion in Moscow, which included 6 people: Archbishop John Albinsky of Nizhny Novgorod, Archpriest: Vvedensky, Endeka, Vdovin, Fedorovsky, layman Alexander Novikov.

On March 15–17, 1923, the All-Russian Congress of SODATs was held in the Third House of Soviets in Moscow, attended by representatives from 26 dioceses. According to Krasnov-Levitin and Shavrov: "the delegates of the congress significantly differed from the "Living Church" members. First of all, there were absolutely no former black-hundredists here, but there were many priests with academic and university badges. An intelligent, liberal, urban priest is the prevailing type among the members of the SODATs." According to memoirs of Vladimir Martsinkovsky, the congress was under the control of Soviet state: "One familiar, convinced and active archpriest, was arrested, the other was "taken away", i.e. forced to wait somewhere until 3 o'clock; then he arrived at the meeting, but it was already over. The speakers, who spoke directly and boldly, were restricted by the Presidium in freedom of speech. I was told by the secretary of the assembly that, as an exiled one from Russia by GPU, I have no right to speak at all." Five resolutions were adopted at the congress. Before the congress closed, the Central Committee of the SODATs was re-elected.

The further activity of the SODATs was to prepare for the Renovationist local council. The election of delegates to the Renovationist local council took place in the context of a fierce struggle between supporters of the SODATs and the "Living Church". For reasons of principle, the Union for Church Revival refused to participate in the pre-council work and the struggle for votes, which was explained by the fact that Antonin (Granovsky) sought to create a small but closely cohesive movement consisting of ardent and morally pure enthusiasts. The struggle between the SODATs and the "Living Church" acquired particularly severe forms in Moscow and Petrograd, which were main opposing centers. In the province, the elections were held more calmly and predictably: if the power in a particular diocese belonged to the "Living Church", its representatives were elected to the council; if it belonged to the SODATs, supporters of the latter were elected. There were cases when representatives of both movements were elected as delegates.

On April 29 to May 9, 1923, a council was held, which took place in an acute struggle between the "Living Church", the SODATs, the "Union for Church Revival", as well as de-facto independent Siberian group of the "Living Church". Fearing that disputes over church transformations would arise at the council, the authorities did not allow the consideration of issues of church reform, except for questions about the new calendar and permission of the second marriage for clergy. The council passed a resolution on the support of the Soviet government and announced the decision of the bishops' council meeting on the defrocking and deprivation of monasticism of Patriarch Tikhon. In the resolution on the report of Alexander Vvedensky, council decided not to introduce any generally binding dogmatic and liturgical reforms. However Vvedensky elected and ordained to the rank of Archbishop of Krutitsy. Instead of the Supreme Church Administration, the Supreme Church Council, headed by Metropolitan Antonin (Granovsky), was formed. It was composed on a proportional basis of representatives of the main Renovationist groups: 10 of the Living Church, 6 of the SODATs, 2 of the "Union for the Church Revival". In June 1923, SODATs leader, Alexander Vvedensky, at one of the public lectures, claimed that he was very dissatisfied with the results of the council and hoped for an early convocation of the next one, which would carry out extensive reforms in the Church.

The Council did not settle the differences between the Renovationist groups. First of all, this was reflected in the joint actions of the SODATs, the "Living Church" and the Siberian clergy against the "Union for Church Revival" and its leader Antonin (Granovsky). On June 22, at a meeting of the Renovationist Moscow Diocesan Council, the deeds of Antonin (Granovsky) were recognized as "betrayal and treason to the church cause." It was decided to ask the Supreme Church Council to "dismiss him from the post of chairman of the Council and deprive him of the title of Metropolitan of Moscow." On June 24, 1923, Krasnitsky applied to the Supreme Church Council with a proposal to "provide Antonin (Granovsky) with a long-term vacation to improve his health." Antonin, in turn called Krasnitsky "a vile schemer and a cassock-bearing footman" and accused Alexander Vvedensky of "moral degeneracy." He described the Supreme Church Council as a "gang of short-maned rascals", and announced his close break with this organization. On the same day, the Supreme Church Council decided to release Antonin from all his posts and dismiss him.

On June 27, 1923, Patriarch Tikhon was released from custody by the Soviet authorities, and on June 28 he sent a message in which he declared loyalty to the Soviet government, condemned the Renovationist schism and its leaders, and called the deprivation of his holy orders and monasticism at the council and the very council as illegal. Patriarch Tikhon's return to Church administration led to the beginning of a mass outflow of believers from the Renovationism to the Patriarchal Church. The branches of the "Living Church" and the SODATs were dissolved, and their members passed into the jurisdiction of Patriarch Tikhon. Krasnitsky, in turn, convened a joint meeting of the Central Committees of the "Living Church" and the SODATs on June 30. However, half of the members of the Central Committee of the "Living Church" did not attend this meeting, and only Alexander Novikov and Alexander Boyarsky arrived from SODATs. Alexander Vvedensky, who was absent in Moscow, knew about the plans of the authorities to create a new unified body by split, therefore he left SODATs. On July 2, 1923, at a joint meeting of the central committees of the "Living Church" and the SODATs, a resolution was adopted: "To invite all Renovationist organizations of the groups "Living Church" and SODATs to focus all their attention on the elimination of the "Tikhonism" as a politically-ecclesiastical-counterrevolutionary organization". It was decided that "representatives of the Renovationist church groups act in a united list, according to one program."

By mid-July 1923, the situation of the Renovationism had deteriorated so much that the Soviet power began to look for new ways to strengthen it. On July 24, 1923, the Anti-Religious Commission considered the issue of uniting three Renovationist groups, decided to "recognize the possibility of uniting into one group". On August 8, 1923, the bishops and commissioners of the Supreme Church Council convened a plenum. The Plenum adopted a number of fundamental decisions. All the renovationist groups were dissolved, and the Supreme Church Council was renamed the "Holy Synod of the Russian Orthodox Church" (otherwise the "All-Russian Holy Synod"). The Renovationist Synod immediately announced that it was not responsible for the actions and orders of the Supreme Church Administration and the Supreme Church Council on all issues of an administrative, economic and other nature. Thus, the rejection of ideological and reformatory continuity with the previous period of the history of Renovationism was proclaimed. SODATs was the only Renovationist group that agreed to self-dissolution, although the united Renovationism did not follow the SODATs program. Vvedensky, who always had a keen sense of the circumstances of the moment, was forced eventually to re-evaluate some of his previous judgments. Already being the renovationist First Hierarch, he confessed to Krasnov-Levitin why he refused church reforms in the 1920s: "I'll tell you the truth: I was afraid that I would be left all alone". Soon SODATs was forgotten.

== Doctrine ==
According to program written by Vvedensky, thanks to the dynamism of early Christianity, it is possible not only to improve the health of the Church and its organic integration into the structure of modern life, but also to modernize society itself, which will follow the ideals of Christianity of apostolic times.

The program including:

- the principle of equality, fraternity and freedom;
- the desire to generalize property;
- equalization of the rights of clerics and laity in the management of the affairs of the community and their associations;
- purification of Christianity from all pagan, the fight against "darkness and ignorance", identification of the causes of those phenomena by believers nature, which gave rise to many superstitions and rituals;
- revision of dogmatics and ethics in order to clarify the true evangelical and apostolic principles of faith and morality, obscured by medieval scholasticism and school theology;
- purification and simplification of worship and bringing it closer to the understanding of the people;
- revision of liturgical books and menologia, the introduction of ancient Apostolic simplicity in worship, in particular, in the furnishings of churches and in the vestments of the priest
- approval of use of modern Russian language and other native languages instead of the obligatory Slavonic;
- the electability of the clergy;
- the abolition of church awards;
- the abolition of compulsory fees for the needs of the cult;
- the elimination of "religious professionalism, that is, the separation of labor from earnings";
- the revision of all church canons and the abolition of those that have lost their relevance;
- solely married ("white") episcopate;
- the closure of monasteries, except of those that are based on the principle of labor and are ascetic in nature
- special emphasis on socially useful work: "the labor principle is obligatory for all believers";
- increasing the importance of women in the Church and the introduction of the rank of deaconesses;
- broad public charity;
- promotion of ecumenism: "the religious-class division of mankind into Catholics, Orthodox, Lutherans, etc. is the work of human hands";
- SODATs declared recognition of the "justice of the social revolution", which was common to all Renovationist organizations.

According to Krasnov-Levitin and Shavrov, the desire of many representatives of the SODATs for the "real renewal of the Church" was stifled, "because political opportunism is such a soil on which the fragrant flowers of church renewal do not grow". According to memoirs of Vladimir Martsinkovsky: "I met here very sincere, religious people, who were ready for a feat, eager for a genuine renewal of the Church. Some of them, led by a prominent archpriest, who developed a reform program, introduced the last necessity of conscious baptism by faith. At the same time, they took advantage of my report submitted to the Patriarch and invited me to business meetings where this issue was discussed. But the main leaders of this group subsequently refused any reforms at all, fearing to be left without people."

== Literature ==
- Левитин-Краснов, Анатолий; Шавров, Вадим (1996). Очерки по истории русской церковной смуты. Материалы по истории Церкви. Книга 9 (in Russian). М.: Крутицкое Патриаршее подворье.
- Шкаровский, Михаил (1999). Обновленческое движение в Русской Православной Церкви XX века (in Russian). СПб.: Нестор.
- Roslof, Edward E. (24 October 2002). Red Priests: Renovationism, Russian Orthodoxy, and Revolution, 1905–1946 (First ed.). Bloomington: Indiana University Press. ISBN 978-0-253-34128-0.
- Крапивин, М. Ю.; Далгатов, А. Г.; Макаров, Ю. Н. (2005). Внутриконфессиональные конфликты и проблемы межконфессионального общения в условиях советской действительности (окт. 1917 — конец 1930-х годов) (in Russian). СПб.: Изд-во СПбГУ. ISBN 5-288-03633-0.
- Головушкин, Дмитрий (2009). Феномен обновленчества в русском православии первой половины XX века (in Russian). Санкт-Петербург: Политехника-сервис. ISBN 978-5-904030-51-3.
- Галутва, Геннадий (2015). Вершины и пропасти Александра Введенского, митрополита и человека (in Russian). Москва; Таруса. ISBN 978-5-9901857-2-2.
- Лавринов, Валерий (2016). Обновленческий раскол в портретах его деятелей. Материалы по истории Церкви. Книга 54 (in Russian). М.: Общество любителей церковной истории. ISBN 978-5-9906510-7-4.
- Лобанов, Вячеслав (2019). «Обновленческий» раскол в Русской Православной Церкви (1922–1946 гг.). СПб.: Петроглиф. ISBN 978-5-8055-0373-4.
- Родионов, Алексей (2025). "К истории обновленческой группировки «Союз общин Древле-Апостольской Церкви»". Вестник ПСТГУ. Серия II: История. История Русской Православной Церкви (in Russian) (123): 101–119.
