= Vvedensky =

Vvedensky (masculine), Vvedenskaya (feminine), or Vvedenskoye (neuter) may refer to:

- Vvedensky (surname) (Vvedenskaya), Russian last name
- Vvedensky Municipal Okrug, a municipal okrug in Petrogradsky District of the federal city of St. Petersburg, Russia
- Vvedensky (rural locality) (Vvedenskaya, Vvedenskoye), several rural localities in Russia

== See also ==
- Vedensky (disambiguation)
