= Living Church (disambiguation) =

Living Church was unofficial name of Renovationism, a schism in the Russian Orthodox Church from 1922 to late 1940s.

- Living Church was the first and one of three major renovationist organizations. It was formed in the spring of 1922 and initially united all the leaders of Renovationism. The leader of the "Living Church" all the time of its existence was protopresbyter Vladimir Krasnitsky. In September 1923, Krasnitsky announced the rupture of the "Living Church" headed by him with the Renovationist Holy Synod, however, most members of the "Living Church" did not follow Krasnitsky, remaining loyal to the Renovationist Synod, and the "Living Church" turned into a small local group of supporters of Krasnitsky. After Krasnitsky's death in 1936 and Great Purge of 1937, the "Living Church" finally disappeared.

Living Church may also refer to:

- The Living Church, a periodical about the Episcopal Church in the United States of America
- Living Church of God, a Christian denomination founded in 1998 in the U.S.
