= Vvedensky (rural locality) =

Vvedensky (Russian: Введенский; masculine), Vvedenskaya (Введенская; feminine), or Vvedenskoye (Введенское; neuter) is the name of several rural localities in Russia.

== Modern localities ==
- Vvedensky, Belgorod Oblast, a khutor in Vvedeno-Gotnyansky Rural Okrug of Rakityansky District in Belgorod Oblast; 50°46′N 35°53′E
- Vvedensky, Oryol Oblast, a settlement in Bagrinovsky Selsoviet of Bolkhovsky District in Oryol Oblast; 53°27′N 36°13′E
- Vvedensky, Voronezh Oblast, a settlement in Novochigolskoye Rural Settlement of Talovsky District in Voronezh Oblast
- Vvedenskoye, Furmanovsky District, Ivanovo Oblast, a selo in Furmanovsky District of Ivanovo Oblast
- Vvedenskoye, Komsomolsky District, Ivanovo Oblast, a village in Komsomolsky District of Ivanovo Oblast
- Vvedenskoye, Kostroma Oblast, a selo in Petrovskoye Settlement of Chukhlomsky District in Kostroma Oblast; 58°45′N 43°2′E
- Vvedenskoye, Vvedensky Selsoviet, Ketovsky District, Kurgan Oblast, a selo in Vvedensky Selsoviet of Ketovsky District in Kurgan Oblast; 55°29′N 65°6′E
- Vvedenskoye, Zheleznodorozhny Selsoviet, Ketovsky District, Kurgan Oblast (or Vvedensky), a settlement in Zheleznodorozhny Selsoviet of Ketovsky District in Kurgan Oblast; 55°26′N 65°8′E
- Vvedenskoye, Mishkinsky District, Kurgan Oblast, a selo in Vvedensky Selsoviet of Mishkinsky District in Kurgan Oblast; 55°19′N 64°5′E
- Vvedenskoye, Kursk Oblast, a selo in Shumakovsky Selsoviet of Kursky District in Kursk Oblast
- Vvedenskoye, Leningrad Oblast (or Vvedenskaya), a village under the administrative jurisdiction of Vyritskoye Settlement Municipal Formation in Gatchinsky District of Leningrad Oblast; 59°22′N 30°27′E
- Vvedenskoye, Domodedovo, Moscow Oblast (or Vvedenskaya), a selo under the administrative jurisdiction of Domodedovo Town Under Oblast Jurisdiction in Moscow Oblast; 55°17′N 38°1′E
- Vvedenskoye, Klinsky District, Moscow Oblast, a village under the administrative jurisdiction of the Town of Klin in Klinsky District of Moscow Oblast; 56°16′N 36°39′E
- Vvedenskoye, Lotoshinsky District, Moscow Oblast, a village in Mikulinskoye Rural Settlement of Lotoshinsky District in Moscow Oblast; 56°22′N 35°38′E
- Vvedenskoye, Odintsovsky District, Moscow Oblast, a selo in Zakharovskoye Rural Settlement of Odintsovsky District in Moscow Oblast; 55°42′N 36°53′E
- Vvedenskoye, Pushkinsky District, Moscow Oblast, a village in Tsarevskoye Rural Settlement of Pushkinsky District in Moscow Oblast; 56°4′N 38°2′E
- Vvedenskoye, Oryol Oblast, a selo in Vakhnovsky Selsoviet of Livensky District in Oryol Oblast; 52°16′N 37°25′E
- Vvedenskoye, Bezhetsky District, Tver Oblast, a village in Laptikhinskoye Rural Settlement of Bezhetsky District in Tver Oblast
- Vvedenskoye, Bulatovskoye Rural Settlement, Kashinsky District, Tver Oblast, a village in Bulatovskoye Rural Settlement of Kashinsky District in Tver Oblast
- Vvedenskoye, Farafonovskoye Rural Settlement, Kashinsky District, Tver Oblast, a selo in Farafonovskoye Rural Settlement of Kashinsky District in Tver Oblast
- Vvedenskoye, Yaroslavl Oblast, a selo in Klimovsky Rural Okrug of Nekrasovsky District in Yaroslavl Oblast

== Alternative names ==
- Vvedenskaya, alternative name of Vvedenskaya Gotnya, a selo in Vvedeno-Gotnyansky Rural Okrug of Rakityansky District in Belgorod Oblast; 50°44′N 35°54′E
- Vvedenskoye, alternative name of Vedenye, a selo in Vlasovskoye Settlement of Oktyabrsky District in Kostroma Oblast; 58°48′N 46°53′E
- Vvedenskoye, alternative name of Vvedenka, a selo in Vvedensky Selsoviet of Lipetsky District in Lipetsk Oblast; 52°43′N 39°41′E
- Vvedenskoye, alternative name of Klementyevo, a village in Klementyevskoye Rural Settlement of Mozhaysky District in Moscow Oblast; 55°38′N 36°2′E

== See also ==
- Vedensky (inhabited locality)
