= Renovationism =

Russian Christian movement, 1922–1946

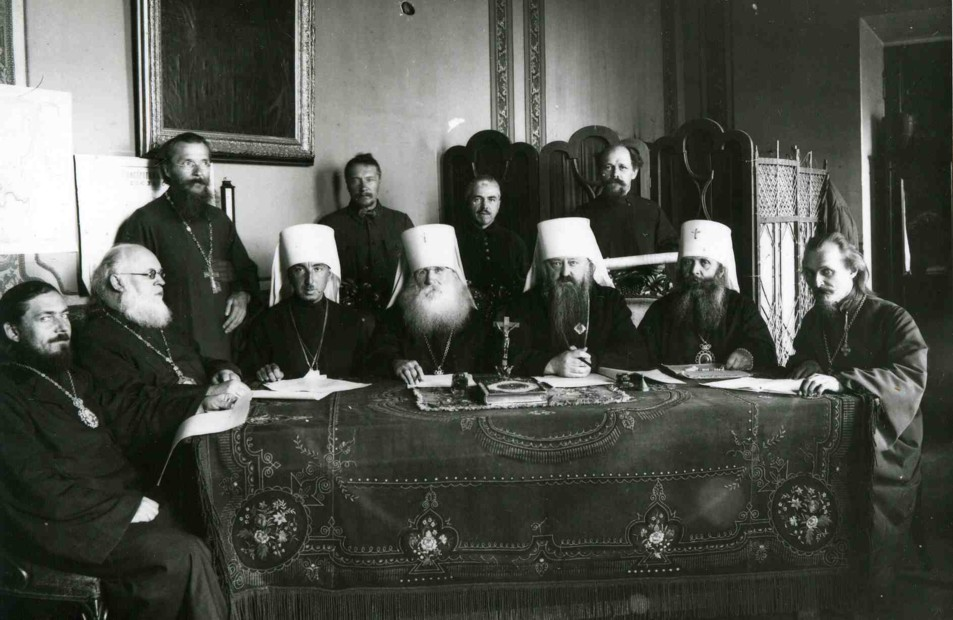
The Renovationist Synod in 1926. Sitting (from left to right): bishops George Zhuk, George Dobronravov, Alexander Vvedensky, Benjamin Muratovsky, Seraphim Ruzhentsov, Alexius Bazhenov and protopresbyter Pavel Krasotin. Standing: Archpriest Nikolai Popov, Professor Sergey Zarin, Professor Boris Titlinov, Archdeacon Sergey Dobrov.

Renovationism (Russian: обновленчество, romanized: obnovlenchestvo; from обновление, obnovlenie 'renovation, renewal')—also called the Renovated Church (обновленческая церковь) or, by metonymy, the Living Church (Живая Церковь, Zhivaya Tserkov')—officially named Orthodox Russian Church (Православная Российская Церковь, Pravoslavnaya Rossiyskaya Tserkov'), and later Orthodox Church in the USSR (Православная Церковь в СССР, Pravoslavnaya Tserkov' v SSSR), was the schism in the Russian Orthodox Church, sanctioned by the Soviet authorities, the movement ceased operations in the late 1940s. In 1927, the movement was blessed by the future Patriarch Sergius of Moscow, a political move that enabled the reformation of the modern Russian Orthodox Church in 1943 by Sergius (Stragorodsky).

This movement originally began as a grassroots movement among the Russian Orthodox clergy for the reformation of the Church, but was quickly influenced by the support of the Soviet secret services (Cheka, then GPU, NKVD), which had hoped to split and weaken the Russian Church by instigating schismatic movements within it. The beginning of actual schism is usually considered to be in May 1922, when a group of Renovationist clergy laid claims to higher ecclesiastical authority in the Russian Church. Three days after the establishment of the new Church, the Soviet authorities arrested Patriarch Tikhon of Moscow on May 19. Both factions were calling each other names "Renovationites" and "Tikhonovites" (Russian: тихоновцы и обновленцы). The movement is considered to have ended with the death of its leader, Alexander Vvedensky, in 1946, although the last unrepentant Renovationist hierarch, Philaret (Yatsenko), died in 1951.

While the entire movement is often known as the Living Church, this was specifically the name of just one of the groups that comprised the larger Renovationist movement. By the time of the Moscow Council of 1923, three major groups had formed within the movement, representing different tendencies within Russian Renovationism: The Living Church of Vladimir Krasnitsky lobbied for the interests of married clergy; the Union of the Communities of the Ancient Apostolic Church (Союз общин древнеапостольской церкви - Содац SODATs) of Alexander Vvedensky; and the Union for the Renewal of the Church (Союз церковного возрождения) – the group of bishop Antonin Granovsky, whose interest was in liturgical reform; along with several minor groups.

== History of the Renovationist Church ==
=== Beginnings and first period (1920s–1930s) ===
In 1919–1920, the Cheka officials began actively seeking contacts with those representatives of the Orthodox clergy who, in their opinion, were suitable for the role of destroyers of the unity of the Russian Orthodox Church. The first attempts to introduce an element of disorganization into the church environment, acting through hierarchs (or former hierarchs) from the patriarch's entourage, were not crowned with success. Therefore, the Cheka decided to act through the young white parish clergy, who are revolutionary in relation to possible intra-church transformations, leading the case to eventually quarrel between "the priests and the episcopate", married ("white") and monastic ("black") clergy. The special VI branch of the GPU became the coordinating center of all efforts to split the Church through the GPU (OGPU since 15 November 1923) headed by Yevgeny Tuchkov. The general management of the process of the split of the Church was concentrated (although not immediately) in the hands of the Politburo of the Central Committee (personally responsible – Leon Trotsky). By the spring of 1922, the necessary organizational preparations for striking the Church were completed. The right moment to start was needed.

Such an opportune moment soon presented itself on the occasion of the launch of a campaign to seize church valuables. As a special representative of the Council of People's Commissars, Leon Trotsky led the work of the Commission on Accounting and Concentration of Values. On January 23, 1922, the members of the Commission agreed that work on the removal of valuables from existing religious institutions should begin in the near future in the two or three most important regions of the country (Moscow, Petrograd, Novgorod). Among the preparatory activities included work with representatives of the Church: "If necessary, individual representatives of the clergy may be involved, who, contrary to the anti-Soviet clergy, would sharply defend the government's measures, thus introducing a split among the clergy." After the events in Shuya on March 15, 1922, where the commission for the seizure of valuables faced massive and stubborn resistance of believers, Leon Trotsky on March 17, 1922, in a letter to Lev Kamenev, Vyacheslav Molotov and Timofei Sapronov, formulated 17 theses containing detailed instructions to the party-Soviet and Chekist bodies regarding the forms and methods of expropriation of church valuables (the leadership of the campaign was henceforth in the hands of party organs). Among other things, it was proposed to "decisively split the clergy" by taking under the protection of state power those clergy who openly advocate the transfer of church wealth to the state.

In the same month, the so-called "Petrograd Group of Progressive Clergy" was formed. The first program document of the group was the declaration on famine relief dated March 24, 1922, was signed by 12 clergymen. The participants of the Petrograd group immediately became active: Alexander Vvedensky and Alexander Boyarsky made reports almost daily, urging them to give away church values. Vladimir Krasnitsky did not make reports, but he tied ties with various institutions, in particular with the Cheka, which was then located on Gorokhovaya Street, 2. It was Krasnitsky who became the main organizer among the participants of the Petrograd group. Under his leadership, which, however, was disputed by Vvedensky and Boyarsky, the Petrograd group became the center of the nascent renovationist movement.

This move was quickly (18 June 1922) denounced by Agathangel as unlawful and uncanonical. However, for a brief time it seemed that the Renovationists had gotten the upper hand. The Renovationists, with full support of Soviet authorities, seized many church buildings and monasteries, including the famous Cathedral of Christ the Saviour in Moscow. In many dioceses, the married ("white") clergy was encouraged to take church government into their own hands, without approval of their diocesan bishops. Simultaneously, these bishops were often threatened and pressed to recognize the authority of the Supreme Church Administration (SCA). In effect, this resulted in "parallel" church administrations existing in one diocese and one city, one supporting the SCA and the other supporting the canonical bishop.

This campaign of terror had its effects: by the summer of 1922, more than 20 hierarchs had recognized the canonical authority of SCA, the most notorious of whom was Metropolitan Sergius (Stragorodsky) of Nizhny Novgorod, the future Patriarch. In many large cities, all of Orthodox church properties were in the hands of Renovationists. Before convening any general council to discuss their measures, the Renovationists began to implement radical reforms aimed at what they perceived to be the interests of the married clergy. Among the measures, changing the traditional order of ecclesiastic life were:

- Permission for monastics (including bishops) to marry, while retaining their episcopal and clerical ranks;
- Permission for the clergy to marry after their ordination, to remarry or to marry widows;
- Permission for the married priests to be consecrated as bishops (Christian Orthodox tradition is that only monastics may be Bishops).

The last decision sparked a number of consecrations of "married bishops" throughout the country, especially in Siberia. As a result of its promulgation, of 67 bishops that arrived to the Second Moscow Council in April 1923, only 20 had been ordained before the schism. The consecration of the "married bishops" without waiting for a conciliar decision on changing appropriate Canons met with opposition even among many Renovationist leaders and those "married bishops" later received a second laying on of hands before the Council opened.

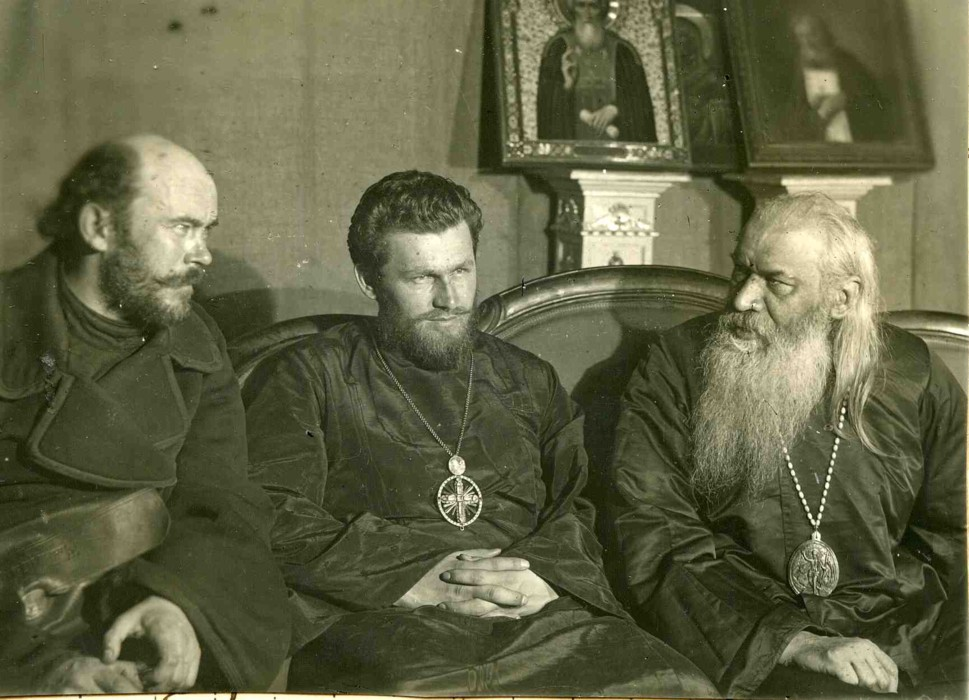
Vladimir Krasnitsky (leader of the "Living Church"), Peter Blinov (leader of the Siberian Renovationist Church), Antonin (Granovsky) (leader of the "Union for Church Revival") on the sidelines of 1923 Renovationist local council for a conversation

The I Renovationist (or officially "II All-Russian" Council) met in Moscow between 29 April and 8 May 1923. Its most controversial and infamous decision was to put Patriarch Tikhon (who was under house arrest, awaiting trial) on ecclesiastic trial in absentia for his opposition to Communism, and to strip him of his episcopacy, priesthood and monastic status. The council allowed the marriage for episcopate and second marriage for priests. Monasteries "as having deviated from the pure monastic idea" were ordered to be closed. The Council then resolved to abolish the Patriarchate altogether and to return to the "collegial" form of church government. The Supreme Church Administration was renamed to the Supreme Church Council, still under the chairmanship of Antonin (Granovsky). Patriarch Tikhon, who was visited by delegation from the council, refused to recognize the authority of this council and the validity of the "court" decision, due to many irregularities in canonical procedure: essentially, the decision had no effect on the life of the Patriarchal or "Tikhonite" Church.

On June 24, 1923, a power struggle among the factions resulted in the forced resignation of Metropolitan Antonin (Granovsky). On June 29, 1923, he declared his "Union for Church Renewal" autocephalous and soon reverting to his previous title of "bishop", engaged in a series of radical liturgical experiments: e.g., moving the altar table to the middle of the church, among other changes. He made one of the first translations of the Divine Liturgy into modern Russian. His group disintegrated in 1929.

The telling blow against Renovationism was the return of Patriarch Tikhon to active duty in June 1923 when, under international pressure, he was released from house arrest. Already by that time, large passive resistance to the Renovationists, especially in rural areas, had undermined their efforts to "take over" the Russian Church. On 15 July 1923, the Patriarch declared all Renovationist decrees, as well as all their sacramental actions (including ordinations) to be without grace, due to the "trickery" by which they tried to seize power in the Church and to their complete disregard for the canons. In August 1923, the council of Russian Orthodox bishops, returned from exile and imprisonment, confirmed Tikhon's decision, proclaiming the Renovationist hierarchy as "unlawful and without grace". Some of the churches were returned to the "Tikhonites" (as Renovationists called the "Patriarchal" Church at that time), and many bishops and priests who had been pressed to support the schism, repented and were received back into communion.

In addition to ecclesiological experimentation, the 1920s, the Renovationist Church had some activity in the fields of education and apologetics. Particularly, in 1924 the church was allowed to open two institutions of higher learning: the Moscow Theological Academy and the Theological Institute in Leningrad. Some contacts were made with other portions of the Christian East: thus, the II Renovationist Council (a.k.a. III All-Russian Council), convened in Moscow in 1–9 October 1925, was marked by the presence of the representatives from the Patriarchates of Constantinople and Alexandria who concelebrated the eucharist with other members of the Renovationist Synod.

In the second half of the 1920s, the canonical Russian Orthodox Church started making steps toward some form of rapprochement with the Soviet regime. Significantly, in 1927, the Deputy Patriarchal Locum Tenens, Metropolitan Sergius Stragorodsky issued a "Declaration" proclaiming absolute loyalty of the Church to the Soviet government and its interests. Subsequently, a Synod formed by Sergius, received recognition from the Soviets. This had effectively put the Renovationist Synod out of place as the chief spokesman for the alliance between the Church and the Soviet state, and it was then that the Renovationist movement began its rapid decline.

=== Decline (1930s–1940s) ===
By the mid-1930s the general failure of the movement had become evident. Having failed to attract the majority of the faithful, the movement ceased to be useful for the Soviet regime and, consequently, both the "Patriarchal" Church and the Renovationists suffered fierce persecution at the hands of Soviet secret services: church buildings were closed down and often destroyed; active clergy and laity were imprisoned and sometimes executed. At the same time, trying to "win back" more traditional Russian Orthodox, the church had abandoned all attempts at ecclesiastical or liturgical reform, with the exception of the concessions previously made to married clergy. Instead, the Renovationist Church made attempts at imitating external liturgical and organizational forms of their opponents from the "Patriarchal" Church.

In 1934, the Renovationist Synod issued an infamous decision declaring the "allegiance to the old church" (староцерковничество), i.e., the Patriarchal Church, to be a "heresy" and a "schism". The mastermind behind that decision, Metropolitan Nikolai (Platonov) of Leningrad resigned from episcopacy in 1938, publicly denounced the faith and became an infamous propagator of atheism. The Renovationist church continued to dwindle in numbers; the process intensified starting in 1939, when the Synod forbade the diocesan bishops to do any priestly ordinations without its approval.

The final blow to the movement came with the beginning of the Second World War in 1941. The Metropolitan's residence had to be relocated due to evacuation. Therefore, the Synod had difficulties contacting and controlling its clergy in the parishes. More importantly, in its efforts to seek moral and financial support from the Eastern Orthodox Church, Joseph Stalin decided to turn to the more popular and traditional Russian Orthodox Church led by Sergius, rather than to its largely unsuccessful rivals. On 8 September 1943, Stalin met with three chief hierarchs of the "Patriarchal" Church and promised to make concessions to the Church and religion in general in exchange for its allegiance and support.

One of the effects of this unlikely concordat was that the days of the Renovationist movement were numbered. What followed was a deluge of Renovationist clerics seeking reconciliation with Sergius. As a general rule, the Patriarchal Church considered all sacraments celebrated by Renovationists "null and void", hence these receiving clergy were received in those orders in which they happened to be upon the moment when they joined the schism (i.e. 1922). The only exception was made for Metropolitan Alexander Vvedensky, who was regarded as the ‘father-founder’ of the schism. Vvedensky refused to come into the Moscow Patriarchy as a layman, and died unreconciled.

In 1943, the Renovationist church had 13 active hierarchs and 10 more bishops, retired or in exile. By 1945 only three bishops remained, one of whom was retired. In Moscow, only one church remained under Renovationist control; the rest of the church properties had been returned by the Soviet government to the Moscow Patriarchy while Vvedensky was in evacuation. Vvedensky died of a stroke on July 8, 1946, with his church in complete disarray. By this time, almost all the Renovationist parishes and clergy had been annexed to the Moscow Patriarchate. After that scattered and isolated communities left in the country, headed by priests, who, in case of repentance, were defrocked for canonical reasons. The last Renovationist bishops to recognize the patriarchal Church were Archbishop Gabriel (Olkhovik) (1948) and Seraphim (Korovin) (August 1, 1948) and Alexander (Shcherbakov) (April 17, 1949). The last Renovationist hierarch in the USSR was Metropolitan Philaret (Yatsenko) of Krutitsy, who considered himself the head of the Renovationist Church. He died in early 1951, leaving no successors.

== Leadership and administration ==
The central administrative body of the Renovationist Church, as well as its entire administration, was in a state of constant flux and changed names several times in the 28-year period of its existence. Initially it was called the Supreme Church Administration (Высшее церковное управление), then Supreme Church Council (1922–23). Thereafter it assumed a more traditional style: The Holy Synod of the Orthodox Church in the USSR (1923–1935). Its President was usually considered a chief hierarch of the church, regardless of the see that he occupied.

In its later years, the Renovationist administration started to lean more toward more "traditionalist" titles. In 1933, the position of the First Hierarch (Первоиерарх) was introduced, in opposition to the "Tikhonite" Church, which was not to have a Patriarch until 1943. The position was given to the then-President of Synod Vitaly Vvedensky; however, since the mid-1920s all power in the Renovationist Church had consolidated in the hands of its actual leader, Metropolitan Alexander Vvedensky. Toward the latter part of the 1930s, A. Vvedensky bore a very peculiar conglomerate of titles, invented specially for him: Metropolitan - Apologete - Evangelizer and Deputy First Hierarch. In the fall of 1941 he himself assumed the title of the First Hierarch and made an abortive attempt to declare himself a Patriarch of all Orthodox Churches in the USSR. The attempt was not received well by his fellow clergy, and in December 1941 he reverted to his previous titles.

=== The Chief Hierarchs of the Renovationist Church ===
The hierarchs in the position of official leaders of the Renovationist Church were:

Chairman of Supreme Church Administration

- Metropolitan Antonin (Granovsky) (15 May 1922 – 8 May 1923)

Chairman of the Supreme Church Council

- Metropolitan Antonin (Granovsky) (8 May – 24 June 1923)
- Metropolitan Yevdokim (Meschersky) (13 April – 8 August 1923)

President of the Holy Synod

- Metropolitan Yevdokim (Meschersky) (8 August 1923 – 9 April 1925)
- Metropolitan Benjamin (Muratovsky) (February 1925 – 6 May 1930)
- Metropolitan Vitaly (Vvedensky) (10 May 1930 – 29 April 1935)

First Hierarchs

- Metropolitan Vitaly (Vvedensky) (5 May 1933 - 6 October 1941)
- Metropolitan Alexander Vvedensky (6 October 1941 – 8 August 1946) self-proclaimed Patriarch during October–December 1941
- Metropolitan Philaret (Yatsenko) (1946–1951) de facto

== See also ==
- Civil Constitution of the Clergy during the French Revolution
- German Christians (movement), an analogous movement in Nazi Germany
- Persecution of Christians in the Soviet Union
- USSR anti-religious campaign (1921–1928)

== Bibliography ==
- Краснов-Левитин, Анатолий (1977). Лихие годы, 1925-1941 [Turbulent Years, 1925-1941]. Paris: YMCA-Press.
- Левитин-Краснов, Анатолий; Шавров, Вадим (1996). Очерки по истории русской церковной смуты [Essays from the History of Russian Church Troubles]. Материалы по истории Церкви. Книга 9 (in Russian). М.: Крутицкое Патриаршее подворье.
- Шкаровский, Михаил (1999). Обновленческое движение в Русской Православной Церкви XX века [The Renovationist Movement in the Russian Orthodox Church in the 20th century] (in Russian). СПб.: Нестор.
- Соловьев, Илья, ed. (2002). "Обновленческий раскол": Материалы для церковно-исторической и канонической характеристики [The Renovationist Schism: the materials for its religious, historical and canonical characterization]. Материалы по истории Церкви. Кн. 27. М.: Крутицкое патриаршее подворье : О-во любителей церковной истории.
- Roslof, Edward E. (24 October 2002). Red Priests: Renovationism, Russian Orthodoxy, and Revolution, 1905–1946 (First ed.). Bloomington: Indiana University Press. ISBN 978-0-253-34128-0.
- Крапивин, М. Ю.; Далгатов, А. Г.; Макаров, Ю. Н. (2005). Внутриконфессиональные конфликты и проблемы межконфессионального общения в условиях советской действительности (окт. 1917 — конец 1930-х годов) [Intra-confessional conflicts and problems of interfaith communication in the conditions of Soviet reality (October 1917 - the end of the 1930s)] (in Russian). СПб.: Изд-во СПбГУ. ISBN 5-288-03633-0.
- Головушкин, Дмитрий (2009). Феномен обновленчества в русском православии первой половины XX века [The phenomenon of Renovationism in Russian Orthodoxy in the first half of the 20th century] (in Russian). Санкт-Петербург: Политехника-сервис. ISBN 978-5-904030-51-3.
- Галутва, Геннадий (2015). Вершины и пропасти Александра Введенского, митрополита и человека [Heights and abysses of Alexander Vvedensky, Metropolitan and man] (in Russian). Москва; Таруса. ISBN 978-5-9901857-2-2.
- Shkarovsky, Mikhail (2017). "The 'Renovationists' and the Soviet State". Orthodox Christian Renewal Movements in Eastern Europe, Christianity and Renewal — Interdisciplinary Studies / A. Djurić Milovanović and R. Radić (Eds.). Cham, Switzerland: Palgrave Macmillan: 67–76.
- Лавринов, Валерий (2016). Обновленческий раскол в портретах его деятелей [The Renovationist schism in the portraits of its figures]. Материалы по истории Церкви. Книга 54 (in Russian). М.: Общество любителей церковной истории. ISBN 978-5-9906510-7-4.
- Лобанов, Вячеслав (2019). «Обновленческий» раскол в Русской Православной Церкви (1922–1946 гг.) [The "Renovationist" schism in the Russian Orthodox Church (1922-1946)]. СПб.: Петроглиф. ISBN 978-5-8055-0373-4.
