= Tuchkov =

Tuchkov may refer to:

- Tuchkov Bridge, a bridge in Saint Petersburg, Russia
- Nikolay Tuchkov, (1765-1812), an officer in the Imperial Russian Army
- Yevgeny Tuchkov (1892–1957), head of the anti-religious arm of the Soviet secret police
