= Living Church =

Renovationist organization

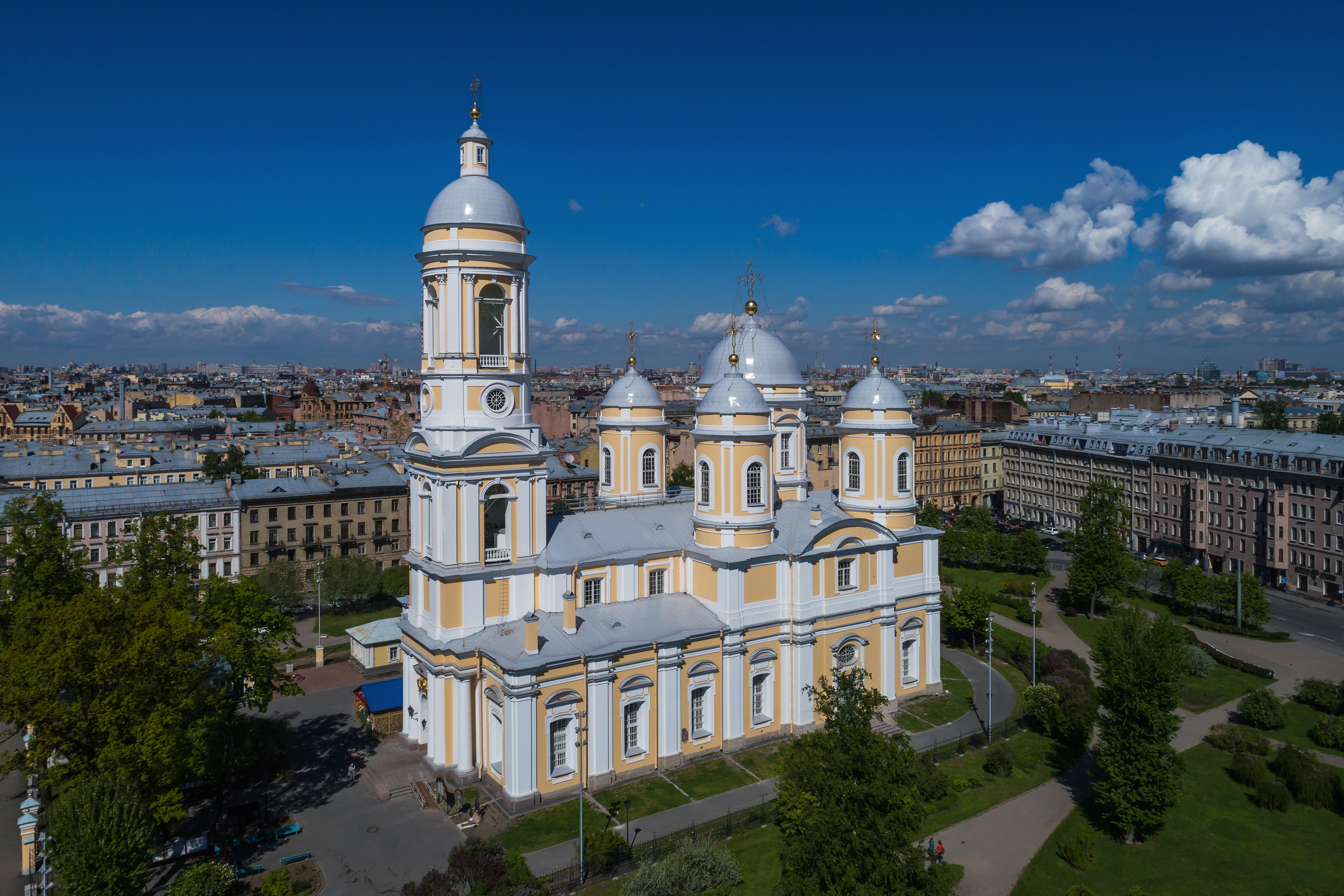
St. Vladimir's Cathedral. The main cathedral of "Living Church" during 1922—1927

The "Living Church" (Russian: Живая Церковь) was a Renovationist organization that emerged in May 1922 with the active support of the State Political Directorate (GPU) under the NKVD of the RSFSR. Throughout its existence, the leader of the "Living Church" was the protopresbyter Vladimir Krasnitsky. Although the "Living Church," at its founding in May 1922, declared its intention to enact sweeping reforms in church life—including revisions of doctrine—in practice, its activities largely revolved around the promotion of privileges for the married ("white") clergy and the suppression of "counterrevolution" within the Church. Initially, it even sought to become a part of the Soviet punitive system. The "Living Church" also rejected any liturgical reforms.

In its early months, the Living Church unified nearly all Renovationist elements, which is why its name became the unofficial designation for the entire schism. However, after the "All-Russian Congress of White Clergy and Laity of the 'Living Church'" held in August 1922, irreconcilable disagreements emerged among its leaders. As a result, many members broke away and formed other Renovationist organizations such as the "Union for Church Revival" (UCR) and the "Union of the Communities of the Ancient Apostolic Church" (SODATs). During October 1922 - August 1923 Living Church, UCR and SODATs were three ruling groups within Renovationist schism.

After being released from house arrest, Patriarch Tikhon condemned the "Living Church" and the Renovationist schism as a whole, which significantly weakened the position of all such groups. In September 1923, Vladimir Krasnitsky announced the break of the "Living Church" from the newly established All-Russian Renovationist Synod (formed a month earlier). However, most members did not follow Krasnitsky, remaining loyal to the Synod. Without state support, the "Living Church" quickly devolved into a small local faction of Krasnitsky's followers, whose numbers steadily declined. With Krasnitsky's death in 1936 and the beginning of the Great Purge in 1937, the "Living Church" ceased to exist altogether.

== History ==
=== Background ===
On March 30, 1922, Leon Trotsky wrote a program note stating the need to promote "reformation" in the Church "under the Soviet banner" in order to "overthrow the counterrevolutionary part of the churchmen" with the help of the "Smenovekhovtsy clergy", and then, "preventing the Smenovekhovtsy leaders from coming to their senses," turn their undertaking into a "miscarriage." The plan of struggle against the Church proposed by Trotsky at that time was approved by the Politburo and began to be implemented, primarily by the GPU organs.

On May 6, Patriarch Tikhon, who was involved in the Moscow trial against the clergy and laity for resisting the seizure of church valuables, was placed under house arrest at his residence on the Trinity Metochion.

On May 9, members of the Petrograd Group of "Progressive Clergy", archpriest Alexander Vvedensky, priest Evgeny Belkov and palm reader Stefan Stadnik, arrived to Moscow. The purpose of the trip was to agitate for the seizure of church valuables and establish closer contacts with the Moscow opposition in connection with the publication of the first issue of the Living Church magazine Together with Vladimir Krasnitsky, who had arrived earlier, they established contacts with like—minded Moscow priests Sergi Kalinovsky, Ivan Borisov, Vladimir Bykov and Saratov archpriests Nikolai Rusanov and Sergi Ledovsky, who were in Moscow. By that time, Kalinovsky had prepared for publication No. 1 of the Living Church magazine. It was decided to give the future organization the same name.

On May 12, late in the evening, priests Alexander Vvedensky, Vladimir Krasnitsky, Evgeny Belkov, Sergi Kalinovsky and the psalmist Matvei Stadnik arrived by car at the Trinity Metochion on Samotyoka, where the head of the convoy was already waiting for them. Kalinovsky got cold feet and stayed in the front hall, while the rest of the GPU employees were escorted up the stairs to the Patriarch's reception room and were present at the meeting. On May 16, the Renovationists met with the Patriarch, received a letter from him to Metropolitan Agathangelus (Preobrazhensky) of Yaroslavl, and on May 17, Krasnitsky left in a government car for Yaroslavl.

On May 18, Vvedensky, Belkov, and Kalinovsky appeared to the Patriarch again and demanded ("filially, we ask for the blessing of Your Holiness") that the patriarchal office be handed over to them. The demand was presented in the form of a document called the Memorandum of the Initiative Group of the Progressive Clergy of the Living Church and with the signature "Your Holiness's most unworthy servants: Vvedensky, Belkov, Kalinovsky"; On this document, the Patriarch imposed a resolution in which he instructed "the persons named below to accept and transfer ... synod affairs." ... [and matters] for the Moscow Diocese" to the bishops of the Russian Orthodox Church, Metropolitan Agathangelus (Preobrazhensky) and Bishop Innocent (Letyaev) of Klin, and before his arrival, Bishop Leonid (Skobeyev) of Verny.

The Renovationists interpreted the decision to transfer the chancellery as a transfer of church authority to them. On the evening of May 18, the first organizational meeting of the new Supreme Church Administration took place in one of the Moscow hotels where Alexander Vvedensky lived. Bishop Leonid (Skobeyev) arrived at the meeting and immediately agreed to head the department.

On May 19, in the afternoon, in the late afternoon, Patriarch Tikhon moved to the Donskoy Monastery and was imprisoned for a year "under the strictest protection, in complete isolation from the outside world, in an apartment above the monastery gates, in which retired bishops used to live." On May 20, members of the new Administration arrived at the Trinity compound in order to begin the planned work to eliminate the "Tikhonite" clergy.

=== Formation into a centralized organization ===
On May 29, 1922 a "Constituent Assembly" was held at the Trinity Metokhion, at which the Living Church movement took organizational shape: a program document entitled "The Main provisions of the Living Church group of Orthodox Clergy and Laity" was adopted, and a "Central Committee" and the Presidium of the Living Church were formed, headed by the priest Vladimir Krasnitsky. In the book "Essays on the history of the Russian Church troubles" it was noted that the newly formed "Central Committee" was the "headquarters of the priest Vladimir Krasnitsky, who immediately set out to create a coherent centralized organization consisting of specially selected people, like a political party." According to Evgeny Belkov, who joined the Central Committee of the Living Church, the relationship between the Supreme Church Administration and the Central Committee of the Living Church group was similar to the relationship between the Central Executive Committee and the Central Committee of the Russian Communist Party (bolsheviks). That is, the "Living Church" was supposed to become a kind of analogue of the Bolshevik party for the entire Renovationist movement, the Supreme Church Administration, headed by Antonin (Granovsky), found themselves in a subordinate position in relation to the Central Committee of the "Living Church" and Krasnitsky. In general, the Living Church group, according to its organizers, was supposed to play the role of the vanguard of the renovationist movement.

Priest Vladimir Krasnitsky developed a Charter, the main slogans of which were the married episcopate, the presbyterian administration and the unified box office. The goals of the "Living Church" were proclaimed:

a) revision of the current laws on church administration in order to find out which of them have been annulled by life itself and are even harmful to the church; b) revision of church dogma in order to highlight those features that were introduced into it by the former Russian system; c) revision of church liturgics in order to clarify and eliminate those layers that were introduced the return of Orthodox worship to the pastoral period of the union of Church and state, and ensuring freedom of pastoral creativity in the field of worship, without violating the perfecting rites of the sacraments; d) The revision of the parish regulations in connection with the modern conditions of church life; e) the revision of church ethics and the development of the doctrine of Christian social life in relation to the social tasks put forward by the times; f) In general, the revision and modification of all aspects of church life that are imperatively required by modern life.

— «Живая Церковь». 1922. № 3. С. 11-12

Nevertheless, as indicated in the book "Essays on the History of the Russian Church Troubles," Krasnitsky's real task was "to explain to the white clergy their class interests and rally them to fight the hierarchs. Krasnitsky's entire program essentially boiled down to this: talking about any broader reforms caused him, as he himself said, a headache". "While maintaining his episcopal authority for appearances, Krasnitsky did everything to turn it into a fiction. In his opinion, the absolute majority of the bishops of the old administration should have lost their power.; It would be nice to deprive them of their lives and freedom as well; but, as Krasnitsky hoped, his friend E. A. Tuchkov would take care of this. Instead of these old bishops, it was planned to ordain new, married bishops who owed their sees exclusively to him, Krasnitsky. The bishop's marriage was a sure guarantee that he would forever remain faithful to the "Living Church" (after all, no one except the living clergy recognizes his bishopric). However, even this bishop's power should be limited to the diocesan administration, which consists of priests who are proteges of the "Living Church." The bishop had only the right to preside over the diocesan administration. Without the approval of the office, the bishop could not even transfer a priest from one church to another or appoint a psalmist. If we consider that in each diocese there was also a special "spiritual official" — an authorized SCA (something like a commissioner from the "Living Church"), who could reverse any decision of the diocesan administration and essentially dismiss the bishop by sending a corresponding recommendation to the SCA, then it should be recognized that the bishop-living Church played a pathetic role. It was just a decorative figure for solemn ceremonies." Rejecting the authority of bishops in the Church, Krasnitsky "equally resolutely rejected the influence of laity on church affairs <...> The Living Church program recognized the right of laity to play a role in church affairs only if they were members of the Living Church group; at the same time, it was emphasized that a lay person must unconditionally obey the parish he does not dare to do anything without the sanction of his priest".

=== At the zenith of influence ===
This 1922 was the time of the greatest strengthening of the "Living Church." Through deception and threats, its representatives sought to seize power in the dioceses, demanding recognition of the Renovationist Central Orthodox Church by the highest ecclesiastical authority. The SCA commissioners maintained contact with local authorities and compiled reports on local church life for them. If the Living Church members were rebuffed by the ruling bishops, they were subjected to repression by the Soviet authorities. The book "Essays on the History of the Russian Church Troubles" describes how this was achieved: "Everywhere and everywhere in the field, under the leadership of Krasnitsky's commissars, diocesan administrations were organized from priests who recognized the "Living Church." In some dioceses, this department was headed by a bishop; in those dioceses where the bishop proved intractable, he usually immediately "disappeared" behind the heavy gates of the local prison. This, of course, as the Living churchmen explained, was always a completely random coincidence. Then the SCA dismissed him. <...> The diocesan administration of the turnout order took power into its own hands". At the same time, the Soviet state press "until September 1922 also covered the events of church life in an exceptionally benevolent spirit for the "Living Church."

During the summer of 1922, the "Living Church" grew in numbers with the active support of the Soviet government. The "Living Church" has been actively supported by the Siberian clergy since its formation. On June 9, 1922, the Siberian Church Administration was formed, headed by Tomsk priest Peter Blinov. By August 1922, out of 97 ruling bishops, 37 recognized the platform of the "Living Church," 36 opposed the Renovationist organization, and 24 did not define their attitude to what was happening.

A review of the political and economic state of the RSFSR prepared by the GPU Information Department in August 1922 noted: "The split among the clergy, which has engulfed almost all of Russia, has slowed down recently. This is explained by the fact that the Renovationists to some extent exhausted the entire stock of priests, who, thanks to the split, followed the reformers. One must say that the contingent of recruits consists of a large number of drunkards who are offended and dissatisfied with the princes of the church, which greatly contributes to the development of antagonism between the two main currents of the clergy. Now the influx has stopped, because the more sedate, true adherents of Orthodoxy do not go to them, among them is the last rabble that has no authority among the believing masses."

On August 6-16, 1922, the All-Russian Congress of the Living Church was held in Moscow in the building of the 3rd House of Soviets (the former Moscow Theological Seminary), attended by 190 delegates from 24 dioceses. Among the participants were 8 bishops: Archbishops Antonin (Granovsky) and Evdokim (Meshchersky), Bishops Macarius (Pavlov), Vitaly (Vvedensky), Bassian (Pyatnitsky), John (Chantsev), John (Albinsky), Nicholas (Fedotov). The guests of honor were representatives of the Greek Orthodox Patriarchates of Constantinople and Alexandria, Archimandrite Iakovos (Dimopoulos) and Pavlos (Katapodis). The chairman of the congress, Archpriest Vladimir Krasnitsky, made every effort to implement a program granting privileges to the white clergy. As a result of the reports, resolutions were adopted on the immediate closure of monasteries, the defrocking of Patriarch Tikhon, the resolution of the marriage episcopate and the second marriage of the clergy. The Supreme Church Administration and the Central Committee of the Living Church were re-elected at the congress. The Central Committee of the Livivg Church, divided into a presidium and a plenum, consisted of 25 people. Archpriest Vladimir Krasnitsky (Chairman), Archpriest Alexei Nimensky (Deputy), Archpriest Dmitry Solovyov (executive secretary), Archpriest Nikolai Bratanovsky and Protodeacon Pokrovsky were elected to the presidium. The plenum, including the members of the Presidium, included all the other elected members. At the end of the congress, Archbishops Antonin (Granovsky) and Evdokim (Meshchersky) were elevated to the rank of metropolitan, Bishops Vitaly (Vvedensky) and Joannicius (Chantsev) to the rank of archbishop, and Krasnitsky was elected protopresbyter of the Living Church. Some of the most active priest delegates were awarded the rank of archpriest and appointed SCA commissioners to their dioceses. Liturgical issues were not directly discussed at the congress.

The head of the 6th department of the Secret Department of the GPU, Evgeny Tuchkov, who oversaw the planting of the Renovationist schism, found out during the congress of the Living Church that three trends had emerged within the Renovationist schism. The former considered the behavior of the Krasnitsky group to be too leftist and sought moderation, which brought this trend closer to Antonin (Granovsky). The second trend stood "from the point of view of the inviolability of the canons." Finally, there was a third trend, "to the left of the Krasnitsky group, which stands for the exclusion of bishops from the government and demands an unceremonious attitude towards them." Alexander Ivanovich Novikov, a layman, became the leader of this "third trend", otherwise known as the "left wing", or the "left group" of the "Living Church".

=== Splits and weakening of influence ===
The decisions of this congress caused discontent in the renovationist environment. In this situation, the authorities decided to organize the process of disintegration of Renovationism, making it as profitable as possible for themselves, since the war between the renovationist movements forced each of them to seek the location of the authorities. In addition, new leaders and new slogans were needed to attract new people to the Renovationist schism. On August 20, 1922, Metropolitan Antonin announced from the creation of the Union for Church Revival (UCR), whose goal was to protect monasticism and the ideals of asceticism. On August 24, 1922, a meeting of supporters of UCR was held in the Zaikonospassky Monastery in Moscow, attended by more than 100 clergy and up to 300 lay people. Metropolitan Antonin announced the resignation of the titles of metropolitan and archbishop, received from the "Living Church" and resigned from the post of chairman of SCA. By allowing a split in the ranks of Renovationism and ignoring Krasnitsky's denunciations that Antonin (Granovsky) was "becoming the banner of counterrevolution," the authorities showed that they no longer considered the Living Church as a priority renovationist group. The influence of the "Living Church" and Krasnitsky began to decline. Already in late August and September, many members of the Living Church, dissatisfied with Krasnitsky's extreme views, joined the Union for Church Revival.

On September 22, 1922, Bishop Antonin, protesting against Bishop Cornelius (Popov)'s removal from monasticism and his inclusion in the SCA, announced at the Zaikonospassky Monastery his withdrawal from the SCA and the termination of Eucharistic communion with the Living Church group. In a press statement, he indicated that he was resigning from the SCA because "authorized groups of the Living Church commit a number of violence against innocent people on the ground just because they do not accept the programs of the Living Church group." On September 23, the SCA decided to remove Antonin from all his positions. In addition to the UCR, Krasnitsky also had to fight against the "left wing." On October 3, 1922, at the expanded plenum of the Central Committee of the Living Church, held at the Trinity Metochion in Moscow, Krasnitsky stated that Novikov, "contrary to group discipline, often voted against proposals to the SCA at meetings, supporting the Antonin group and thereby undermining both the group's authority and discipline among its members. <...> Under the banner of the "Living Church," he tried to organize some kind of special, "left-wing" trend, which, in his opinion, was supposed to play the role of reconciler of the two renovationist groups in the SCA. He developed a special program for his group, which <...> was supposed to have as its goal the rejection of the dogma of the Ever-Virgin of Mary and the annulment of as many as five sacraments at the Council, which could in no way speak about his Orthodoxy. Such activities of Novikov ... and his "broad reform program" cannot in any case be tolerated in the Living Church group." On the same day, Alaxander Novikov was "unanimously" expelled from the Living Church.

By mid-October 1922, the leadership of the USSR had changed its policy towards Renovationism. In order to successfully confront the Patriarchal Church, the state needed consolidated Renovationism, and therefore its collapse was unprofitable at this stage. Therefore, the GPU began to unite the disintegrating Renovationism. After negotiations, Antonin agreed to head the SCA again on the condition of equal representation of all groups, but flatly refused to recognize the married episcopate and the second marriage of the clergy. In October of the same year, Alexander Vvedensky and Alexander Novikov headed another renovationist association, the Union of the Communities of the Ancient Apostolic Church (SODATs), which was joined by the Petrograd group of the Living Church, led by Archpriest Alexander Boyarsky. On October 17, 1922, a new composition of the Supreme Church Administration was formed, in the presidium of which there were only two living churchmen out of six people, and 5 out of 17 ones in the plenum. The SODATs began to actively replenish with new members, and often they were former Living Church officials. The SODATs began to turn into an influential group, becoming the main competitor of the "Living Church" within the Renovationist schism, pushing aside the UCR. At the same time, the popularity of the SODATs was mainly due to the general disgust that the "Living Church" caused. By January 1923, the Trinity Metochion in Moscow had passed under the jurisdiction of the SODATs, where, following the example of the Living Church, the Central Committee of the SODATs was organized.

Despite the split, the Living Church continued to gain new members. On the territory of the Ukrainian SSR, the beginning of active activity to promote Renovationism lagged behind for several months, and only in autumn did the process of widespread formation of cells of the "Living Church" and their seizure of church power begin to unfold. The "Living Church" did not immediately appear in Belarus either. It was only in October 1922 that the provincial committee of the Living Church group was established in Vitebsk through the efforts of Priest Mikhail Svidersky, who was appointed commissioner of the SCA. In these circumstances, the Soviet government relied on the "Living Church." On October 31, 1922, the Anti-Religious Commission (ARC) under the Central Committee of the RCP(b) decided to "take a firmer bet on the Living Church group," giving it priority support.

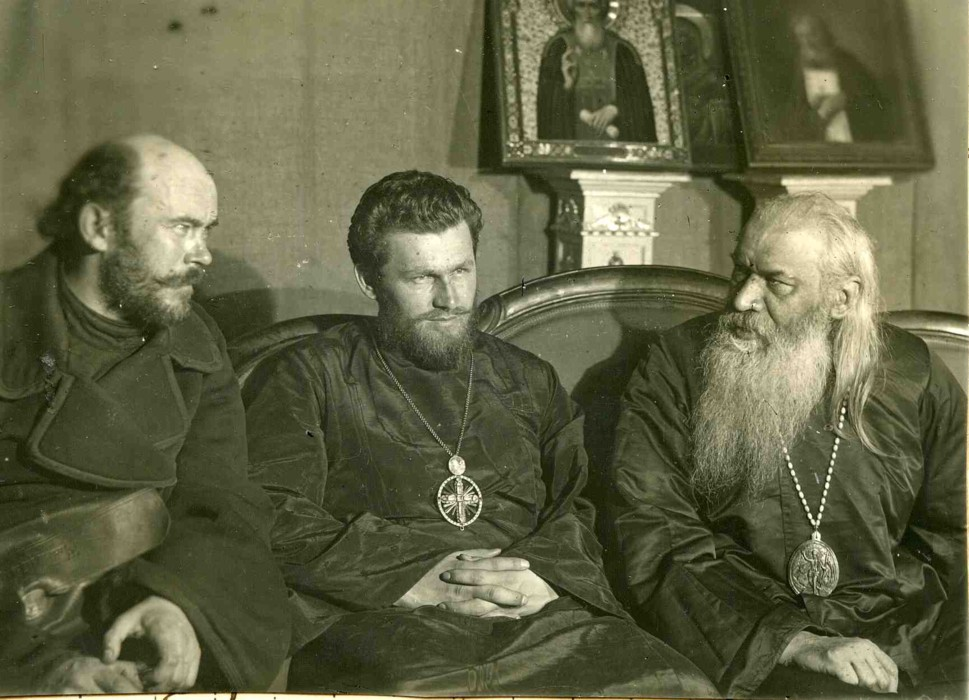
Vladimir Krasnitsky (leader of the "Living Church"), Peter Blinov (leader of the Siberian Renovationist Church), Antonin (Granovsky) (leader of the "Union for Church Revival") on the sidelines of 1923 Renovationist local council for a conversation

The election of delegates to the renovationist local council took place in the context of a fierce struggle between supporters of the SODATs and the "Living Church"; the UCR refused to fight for votes. On the eve of the local council, Living Church held pre-council congress on April 27-28, 1923 in Moscow. A similar congress was held by SODATs. At the Renovationist local council held in Moscow from April 29 to May 9, 1923, representatives of the "Living Church" still dominated: out of about 500 delegates, 200 represented the Living Church, 116 represented the SODATs, 10 represented the SCA, the rest of the delegates were listed as "non-partisan." The Council decided to condemn and defrock Patriarch Tikhon, as well as a number of resolutions consistent with the program of the "Living Church": on the introduction of a marriage episcopate, on the permission of second marriage to clergy, on the closure of monasteries. However, Krasnitsky's proposal for further radical reforms of church life (the transition to "materialistic Christianity", etc.) did not find support from the council. Krasnitsky was elevated to the rank of "protopresbyter of the Russian Orthodox Church" and was elected deputy chairman of the Supreme Church Council, which replaced the Supreme Church Administration, in which representatives of the "Living Church" received 10 seats, the SODATs—6, the UCR—2.

Vladimir Krasnitsky highly appreciated this council: "The Living Church Group won both morally and materially. Morally, she dictated all the work of the Council, materially, she won the majority of 10 out of 18 seats in the new Supreme Church Council. During the council, she rallied, hardened, became stronger and felt her strength." However, the UCR, SODATs, and the Siberian Renovationists, striving for greater development of church reforms, were not satisfied with the council. The intense rivalry between the Renovationist groups continued.

On June 27, 1923, Patriarch Tikhon was released from arrest and assumed control of the Church. In his anti-Renovationist statements, he noted the Renovationists' desire to eliminate all those who disagree, to carry out reforms that push the Church towards sectarianism, and their thirst for benefits, ranks, and awards. He noted that with the help of deception and lies, the leaders of the "Living Church" uncanonically and arbitrarily seized the highest church authority in May 1922, "in order to plant the so-called "Living Church" everywhere." The Patriarch's messages marked the beginning of a massive return from the Renovationist schism of bishops, clergy and laity, which also weaken the "Living Church."

=== Break with the Renovationist Synod and decline ===
In order to save the Renovationist movement, the OGPU and the Anti-Religious Commission of the Central Committee of the Russian Communist Party (b) decided to create a new renovationist body, remove the most odious figures of the "Living Church" who discredited themselves in the eyes of believers and attract more bishops of the old order to its membership. On August 8, 1923, the plenum of the Supreme Church Council adopted resolutions on the dissolution of all Renovationist movements, including the Living Church, and the renaming of the Supreme Church Council to the Holy Synod of the Russian Orthodox Church, headed by Evdokim (Meshchersky). The leadership of the Renovationist Synod included many former living churchmen, but Krasnitsky himself, who had an extremely odious reputation even in the Renovationist environment, was removed from the central Renovationist leadership.

Krasnitsky refused to dissolve the "Living Church" and left for Petrograd. In September 1923, in Petrograd, he announced the severance of the "Living Church" headed by him from the Renovationist Holy Synod, but most of the members of the "Living Church" did not follow Krasnitsky, remaining loyal to the Renovationist Synod. After that, the Living Church turned into a small renovationist group, which nevertheless tried to fight for control of the Renovationist parishes in Petrograd. In January 1924, Krasnitsky was expelled by supporters of the Renovationist Synod from the Kazansky Cathedral, after which the "Living Church" practically lost its serious influence.

In the spring of 1924, the OGPU and the Anti-Religious Commission of the Central Committee of the RCP(b) tried to use the "Living Church" to compromise Patriarch Tikhon by organizing his "reconciliation" with Krasnitsky and introducing the latter into the leadership of the Patriarchal Church. According to the plan of "disintegration of the Tikhonite church party", outlined by Krasnitsky in the OGPU report, the goal of the "Living Church" was "to revive ... the group with its own diocesan district and dean committees and to oppose the Tikhonite bishops and deans ... to restore the tactics that were in 1922".

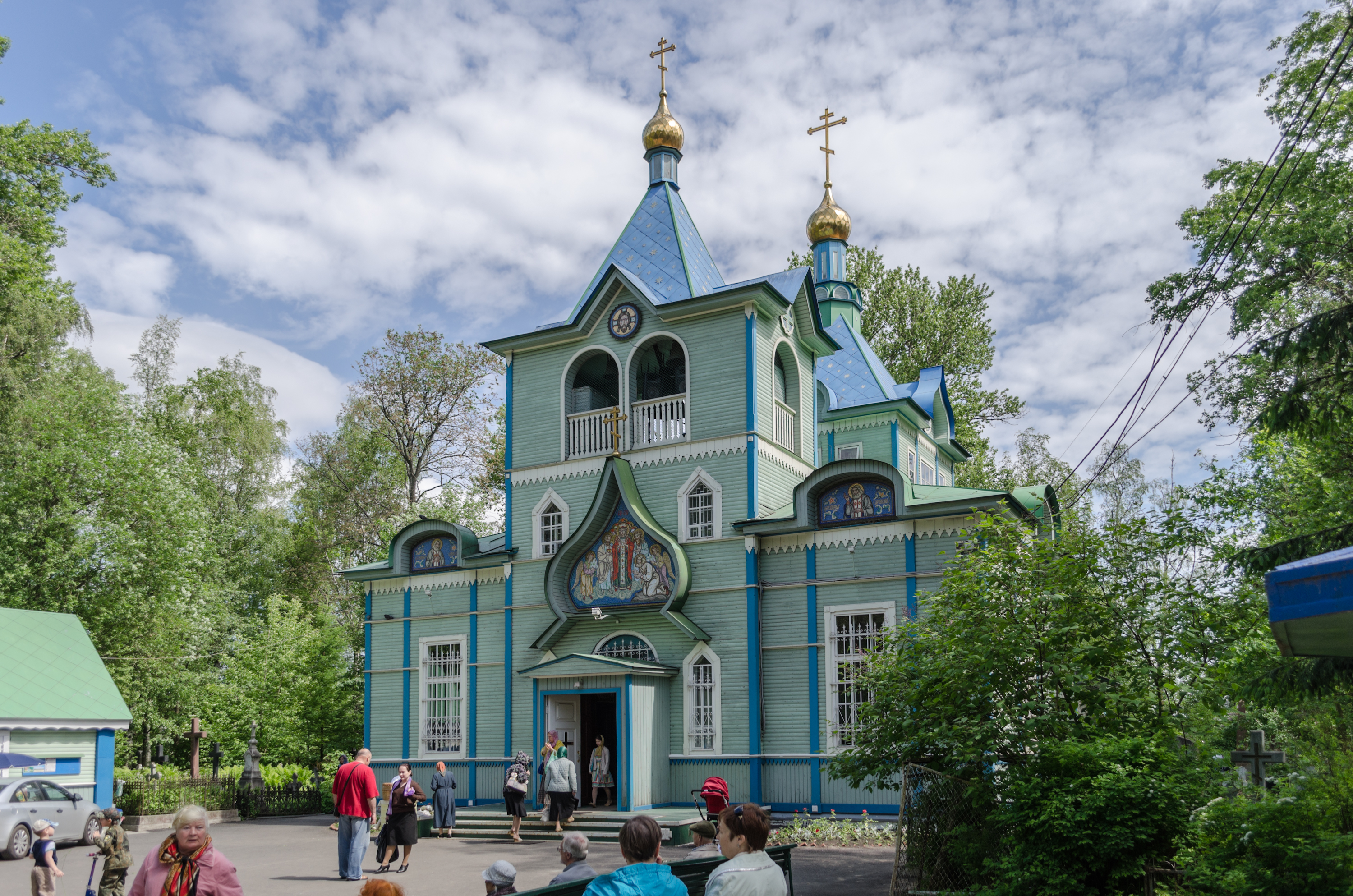
The Church of St. Seraphim of Sarov at the Serafimovsky Cemetery. The last church of Living Church

On May 21, 1924, Patriarch Tikhon signed a decree on the formation of a new expanded Synod and the Supreme Church Council, which, along with the clergy and laity who remained loyal to the Patriarch, included Krasnitsky and other figures of the "Living Church" who agreed to repent. This decision provoked sharp criticism from the clergy and believers loyal to Patriarch Tikhon, which was compounded by Krasnitsky's demands to grant him the post of deputy chairman of the Supreme Church Council and retain the rank of protopresbyter, received in renovationism. On July 9, 1924, Patriarch Tikhon imposed a resolution invalidating the previously issued act on the formation of the Synod and the Supreme Church Council. After Krasnitsky openly admitted the failure of his attempts to reach an agreement with the Patriarchal Church in September 1924, almost all former supporters left the Living Church.

From that time on, Krasnitsky served on Sundays without a deacon and a psalmist in the Prince Vladimir Cathedral of Leningrad. In total, in Leningrad, the "Living Church" included no more than 2-3 churches and chapels. The preservation of the "Living Church", even as an extremely insignificant organization, was beneficial to the authorities, who continued to view this group as a threat to the Church. In 1929, the only remaining part of the "Living Church" was the Serafimovskaya Church at the Serafimovsky Cemetery in Leningrad. Archbishop John Albinsky, who served in the church on public holidays, gave some solidity, but in 1934 he left the "Living Church" and joined the Renovationist Holy Synod. Having lost its leader with Krasnitsky's death in March 1936, the last living church community ceased to exist.

== Literature ==
- Краснов-Левитин, Анатолий [in Russian]; Шавров, Вадим (1996). Очерки по истории русской церковной смуты. Материалы по истории Церкви. Книга 9 (in Russian). М.: Крутицкое Патриаршее Подворье.
- Соловьёв, Илия (2008). ""Живая церковь"". Orthodox Encyclopedia (in Russian). Moscow. pp. 168–172.
- Иванов, Сергий (2014). "Хронология обновленческого «Переворота» в Русской Церкви по новым архивным документам". Вестник ПСТГУ. Серия 2: История. История Русской Православной Церкви (in Russian). 58 (3): 24–60.
- Лавринов, Валерий [in Russian] (2016). Обновленческий раскол в портретах его деятелей. Материалы по истории Церкви. Книга 54 (in Russian). М.: Общество любителей церковной истории. p. 736. ISBN 978-5-9906510-7-4.
- Головушкин, Дмитрий (2015). "Понятие «Живая церковь»: к вопросу о происхождении, интерпретациях и смысле" (PDF). Религиоведение (in Russian) (2): 43–52.
- Крякин, Евгений (2018). "Феномен «Живой Церкви» в контексте общественно-политических процессов 1920-х гг. (на материалах журнала «Живая Церковь»)". Манускрипт (in Russian). 3 (89). Тамбов: Грамота: 46–50. ISSN 1997-292X.
- «Чем меньше будет мудрых духовных мужей, тем для нас будет гораздо выгоднее». Документы Секретно-оперативного управления ГПУ о работе по расколу Русской Церкви в 1922 г. / Вступ. ст., публ. и примеч. свящ. А. В. Мазырина и И. Н. Смоляковой // Вестник Екатеринбургской духовной семинарии. 2020. № 3 (31). С. 369–378.
- Петров, Станислав (2021). "Попытка присоединения «Живой церкви» к патриарху Тихону в восприятии алтайских обновленцев (1924 г.)" (PDF). Церковь. Богословие. История (in Russian) (2): 112–120.
- Мазырин, Александр [in Russian] (2022). "На какой компромисс с обновленцами соглашался Патриарх Тихон в 1923–1924 гг. Часть 2: переговоры с «Живой Церковью» Владимира Красницкого. 1924 г." (PDF). Вестник Екатеринбургской духовной семинарии (in Russian) (37): 161–198.
- Иванов, Сергий (2024). Святой Патриарх Тихон и изъятие церковных ценностей в 1922 году. Материалы по новейшей истории Русской Православной Церкви (in Russian). Moscow: Изд-во ПСТГУ. p. 824. ISBN 978-5-7429-1490-7.
- Родионов, Алексей (2025). "К истории обновленческой группировки «Союз общин Древле-Апостольской Церкви»". Вестник ПСТГУ. Серия II: История. История Русской Православной Церкви (in Russian) (123): 101–119.
