= Vvedensky (surname) =

Vvedensky (Russian: Введенский) (masculine) or Vvedenskaya (feminine) is an artificial Russian surname originated in clergy, derived after the feast of Введение во храм Пресвятой Богородицы, i.e., the Presentation of Mary, possibly after a church or monastery named VVedensky.

Notable people with the surname include:

- Alexander Vvedensky (poet) (1904–1941)
- Alexander Vvedensky (religious leader) (1888–1946)
- Alexei Ivanovich Vvedensky, Russian botanist
- Arseny Vvedensky (1844–1909), literary critic
- Boris Vvedensky, Russian radiophysicist, chief editor of the Great Soviet Encyclopedia
- Nikolai Vvedensky (1852–1922), Russian physiologist

== See also ==
- Vvedensky (disambiguation)
