= Vedensky =

Vedensky (masculine), Vedenskaya (feminine), or Vedenskoye (neuter) may refer to:

- Vedensky District, a district of the Chechen Republic, Russia
- Vedensky (inhabited locality) (Vedenskaya, Vedenskoye), name of several rural localities in Russia
