= Vladimir Martsinkovsky =

Russian Christian thinker, publicist, theologian, and public figure

Vladimir Filimonovich Martsinkovsky

Personal life
- Born: 2 August 1884 Derman|in Derman, Volhynian Governorate, Russian Empire
- Died: 9 September 1971 (aged 87) Haifa, Israel
- Buried: International cemetery of Haifa
- Spouse: Nelli Schumacher
- Notable work(s): "Notes of a Believer" and others

Religious life
- Religion: Formally Russian Orthodoxy, effectively Evangelical
- Denomination: Ecumenism

Vladimir Filimonovich Martsinkovsky (2 August 1884 – 9 September 1971) was a Christian thinker, publicist, theologian, and public figure. He was one of the leaders of the Russian Student Christian Movement (RSCM) in the Russian Empire.

He is known for numerous books, pamphlets, articles, lectures, and sermons. He attempted to reform the Russian Orthodox Church regarding the doctrine of baptism by faith and other issues. According to Martsinkovsky, an evangelically renewed Orthodoxy, alongside Protestantism, was to become a source of spiritual awakening for society. While maintaining affiliation with the Orthodox Church, he served as a Protestant pastor and evangelist.

In 1923, he was exiled from the USSR and, after moving through Europe, settled in Palestine in 1930.

== Biography ==
=== Before Conversion ===
Vladimir Martsinkovsky was born in 1884 in the village of Derman, Volhynian Governorate, Russian Empire. A year after his birth, his family moved to Grodno. His mother, the daughter of an Orthodox priest, raised Vladimir in a Christian spirit. In Grodno, there was a community of Baptists, whose meetings Vladimir attended as a high school student. He used to read he Holy Scriptures together with his grandfather, and noticed that the reader was skipping parts, Vladimir asked why, and his grandfather replied that not everything needed to be known by the people.

In 1902, after graduating from high school with a silver medal, Martsinkovsky enrolled in the Faculty of History and Philology at Saint Petersburg State University, graduating with distinction.

Early in his university years, Vladimir was not fully a Christian and, when asked about his faith in Christ, responded indifferently. At the university, he met Pavel Nikolay, the founder of the Russian Student Christian Movement (RSCM). Through him, in 1904, Martsinkovsky experienced a conversion to Christ. "Christ—the living, saving one who loved me—became a reality," he recalled.

=== Service in the Russian Student Christian Movement ===
Having undergone a worldview transformation, he became passionate about the idea of "going to the people." During vacations, Martsinkovsky traveled along the Volga with a box of Christian literature, distributing it in nearby villages.

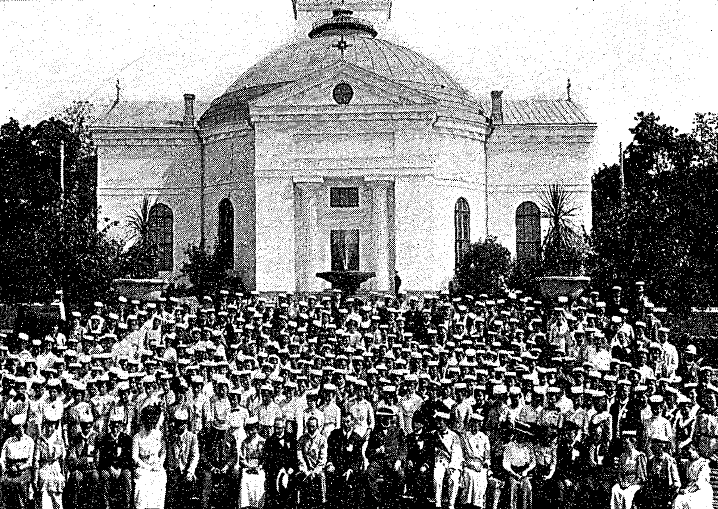
Conference of the Russian Student Christian Movement in the Finnish city of Tavastehus (modern Hämeenlinna) in 1913

After graduating in 1907, he taught literature at men's and women's high schools in Grodno. The growing RSCM needed workers, and in 1913, Pavel Nikolay invited Martsinkovsky to work in the movement in Moscow. He agreed. His relatives viewed the shift from a prestigious career to an uncertain future as madness but could not dissuade him.

As one of the RSCM leaders, Martsinkovsky attended a YMCA conference in the United States in 1913 and became a member. He was offered the role of YMCA coordinator in Moscow with a salary. Representing the YMCA, he visited higher education institutions in Russia and traveled extensively, delivering Christian lectures. Some of these were later published as pamphlets, articles, and books. Martsinkovsky preached successfully to both rural peasants and metropolitan intellectuals. He was well-versed not only in the Bible but also in Orthodox Holy Tradition, often quoting the Church Fathers. His lectures were sometimes accompanied by music, and he occasionally played the violin himself.

He also participated in the Moscow Religious-Philosophical Society named after Vladimir Solovyov, maintained communication with the elders of Optina Monastery, and met with Pavel Florensky.

=== In Soviet Russia ===
After the Bolsheviks came to power, Vladimir continued delivering lectures on Christian themes and participated in anti-religious debates, defending Christianity. He attended the Local Council of the Russian Orthodox Church (1917–1918) as a guest, which disappointed his hopes for reforming the Russian Orthodox Church.

During the early Russian Civil War, he found himself in Samara, cut off from Moscow by fighting. His lectures were popular, and at the request of Samara State University students, he was appointed professor of ethics in 1919. On 11 May 1919, after a lecture titled "Can We Live Without Christ?" in which he called atheism madness, he was arrested. The next day, he was released under a non-departure pledge.

In autumn 1919, Martsinkovsky returned to Moscow and traveled to provincial cities with lectures. In 1920, at a debate in Moscow's Polytechnic Museum, he and other religious figures opposed Anatoly Lunacharsky. The debate followed Lunacharsky's lecture "Why We Should Not Believe in God" and Martsinkovsky's response, "Why We Should Believe in God." Martsinkovsky was deemed the winner.

In September 1920, Martsinkovsky was baptized by faith by a Mennonite preacher, Yakov Tevs, but remained in Orthodoxy rather than joining a Protestant church.

=== In imprisonment ===
His mother and sister joined him in Moscow, where they rented an apartment and began settling in. However, on 4 March 1921, Martsinkovsky was arrested again. He was held in a VChK cell with about 70 others, mostly political prisoners. He organized "Sunday readings" and lectures for them.

On 11 April, he was transferred to Taganka Prison, where, alongside criminals, prominent Russian Orthodox Church figures were held, including former Chief Procurator of the Holy Synod Alexander Samarin, Metropolitans Kirill (Smirnov) of Kazan, Seraphim (Chichagov) of Warsaw, and Archbishop Filaret (Nikolsky) of Samara. The prison authorities allocated a space for Orthodox prisoners' services. Martsinkovsky attended but was denied communion by Metropolitan Kirill due to his recent Protestant baptism.

In prison, Martsinkovsky learned bookbinding, took English lessons, and studied Hebrew with a Jewish prisoner. He organized a group for reading the Gospel. He was released on 14 October 1921 after over seven months of imprisonment.

=== Exile ===
Despite agreeing upon release to refrain from agitational and organizational activities among youth, Martsinkovsky resumed lecturing and working in student circles. According to N. Sokolova, daughter of Orthodox theologian and historian Nikolay Pestov, her father became a believer after attending Martsinkovsky's lecture in autumn 1921. Leaving the lecture, Red Army soldier Nikolay Pestov tore up his party membership card. He began attending a student circle, where he met his future wife and later became a devoted Christian.

In winter 1922, Martsinkovsky visited the Kremlin, unsuccessfully attempting to legalize the Christian Student Union. During this period, he conducted research in the manuscript department of the Russian Public Library on the authenticity of Gospel texts, later publishing the book "Is the Gospel Reliable?"

In late 1922, while lecturing in Odessa, he was urgently summoned to Moscow. Upon arrival, he learned his apartment had been searched. He was called to the GPU, where he signed a non-departure pledge. Later, he was informed of his three-year exile from the USSR. Given ten days to prepare, he left for Prague in late April 1923. His exile was part of the mass deportation of intelligentsia from Soviet Russia, known as the "Philosophers' Ship".

=== Failure with Emigrant RSCM ===
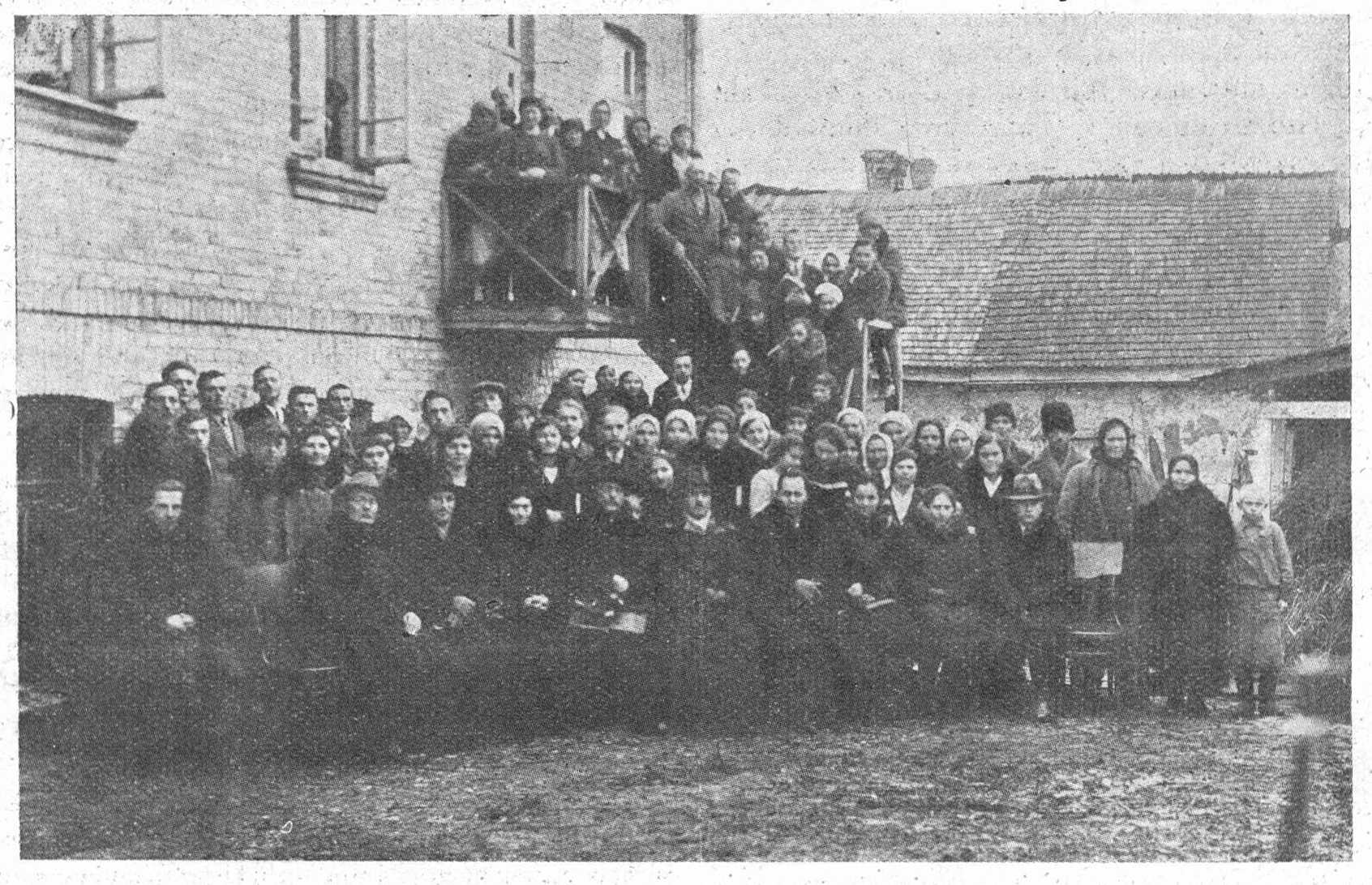
In December 1935, Martsinkovsky lectured on the Holy Land at women's evangelical courses in Lutsk. In the photo, Martsinkovsky is seated in the center (with a briefcase), his wife Nelli to his left

Martsinkovsky delivered his first lecture as an emigrant in Riga en route (via his native Grodno) to Prague.

Among Russian emigrants, there was much youth, and Martsinkovsky resumed work in Christian youth circles already established in Paris, Berlin, and Prague. He was among the initiators of the first organizational congress of the emigrant Russian Student Christian Movement (RSCM) in Pršerov, Czechoslovakia, in 1923. At the congress, the RSCM (and later the Russian YMCA branch) shifted toward confessional Orthodoxy. Due to his rejection of the pre-revolutionary RSCM's interdenominational principle, conflicts arose with other leaders. He was gradually sidelined from organizational work in the RSCM and later collaborated only sporadically through personal contacts, such as with Nikolay Zernov.

=== Cooperation with Protestants ===
Martsinkovsky closely collaborated with the mission "Light in the East". Its leaders, Walter Jacques and Yakov Kreker, often accompanied him, handling organizational matters for his lectures. The mission's headquarters were in Wernigerode, Germany, where, in 1927, Martsinkovsky wrote Notes of a Believer, recounting his spiritual work in pre-revolutionary and Soviet Russia. The book remained banned in the USSR until the fall of Soviet power.

He maintained contact with Ivan Prokhanov, leader of Evangelical Christians (Prokhanovites), and the emigrant World Union of Evangelical Christians, even considered as a potential leader of the organization, and wrote for their journal Evangelical Faith. Historian Wilhelm Kale noted that theological-dogmatic differences between Prokhanov and Martsinkovsky were minimal, but Martsinkovsky advocated complete freedom, while Prokhanov sought to balance freedom and unity.

Martsinkovsky continued lecturing on Christian themes across Europe. Before the war, he regularly preached in his native Volhynia and Belarusian Polesie, then part of Poland. In the mid-1930s, while in Warsaw, he applied to the Soviet consulate to return to the USSR. When asked what he would do there, he replied he would call people to faith in God and was promptly denied.

=== In Israel ===
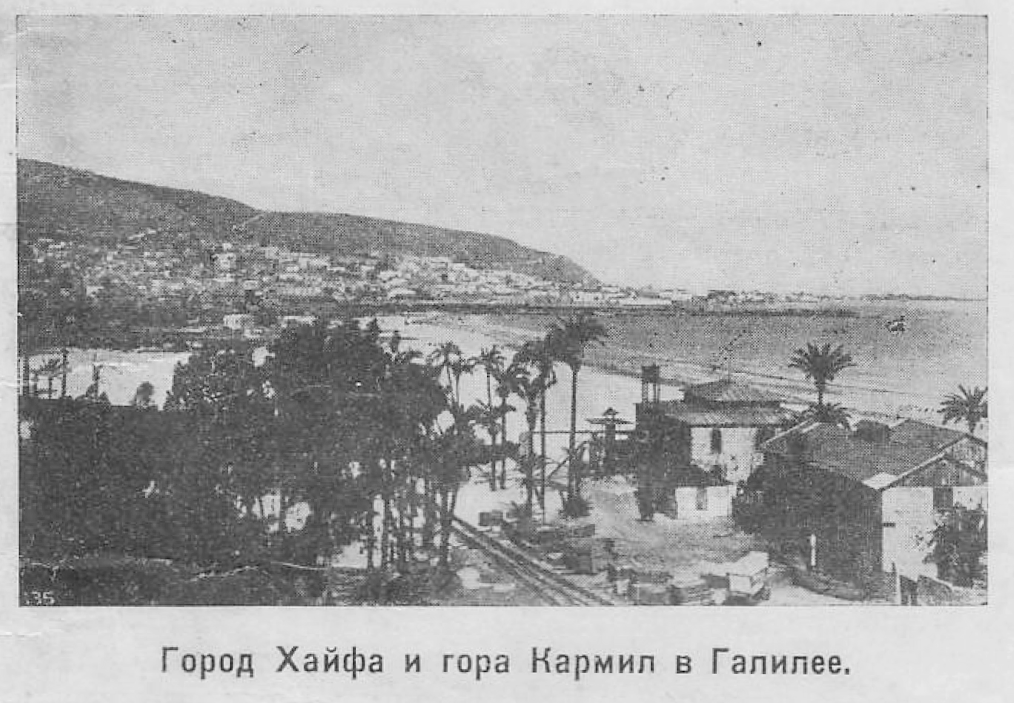
City of Haifa and Mount Carmel in Galilee. Illustration for one of Martsinkovsky's lectures published in the journal Evangelical Faith in 1932

Since 1930, Martsinkovsky settled in Palestine, where he married Nelli Schumacher, a deaconess of the Templers community and daughter of Biblical archaeologist. Nelli often accompanied him on lecture trips across Europe.

Living in Palestine, and later the State of Israel, Martsinkovsky learned Arabic and Syriac and improved his Hebrew (mastering ten languages, including biblical ones, over his lifetime). His home on the slopes of Mount Carmel often hosted Christians—Arabs, Jews, and others. Preaching among locals, he organized several mixed communities and led the Haifa community of Free Brethren (evangelical Protestants) for many years. He published works on Christianity and Judaism and the philosophy of Vladimir Solovyov (known for the formula: "If Jews are truly Jews and Christians are truly Christians, they will become brothers"). Some of his works were translated into Hebrew.

Shortly after Adolf Hitler's election victory in Germany, Martsinkovsky visited Berlin, delivering evangelistic sermons to local Jews. At one meeting, a large group of young Nazis in uniform attended. When he spoke against antisemitism, they stood and shouted, "Get out! Go to Palestine!" Nevertheless, he continued his lectures, though stormtroopers disrupted subsequent events.

=== New home ===
In 1943, Martsinkovsky and his wife faced issues: taxes on their home and large plot of land became exorbitant. They considered selling and moving to another Israeli city. Martsinkovsky prayed for a resolution. During prayerful reflection, he opened the Bible to the verse: "Feed your people with your rod, the flock of your heritage, which dwell solitarily in the wood, in the midst of Carmel; let them feed in Bashan and Gilead, as in the days of old!" (Micah 7:14). The couple derived three signs for their new home: forest, solitude, and the center of Carmel.

The next day, at the city real estate office, they learned of a plot for sale in "Cave Road"—a forested area between mountain ridges overlooking the Mediterranean. The Martsinkovskys purchased it and began building a new home. Challenges for Christians in Israel starting in 1948 (bans on Christian preaching, workplace issues, and attacks by fanatics) did not deter them. In 1949, they completed their new home, naming it "Adullam" after the Adullam cave where David hid. The location was indeed secluded.

External audio
- Vladimir Martsinkovsky’s Radio Lectures
- The Meaning of Suffering
- On Suffering (continued)

Martsinkovsky mastered radio preaching, appearing on Radio Monte Carlo and Trans World Radio. In his later years, he received a tape recorder as a gift, recording lectures for broadcasts, beginning with: "This is Vladimir Martsinkovsky, Mount Carmel in Galilee." He also contributed to the scholarly editing of Ohyenko's Ukrainian Bible translation.

He died on 9 September 1971 in Haifa and was buried in Haifa's international cemetery on a plot for Jewish Christians. His tombstone reads: "I am willing to depart and be with Christ, which is far better" (Philippians 1:23). His wife Nelli outlived him by 20 years, passing in 1991. Buried beside him, her tombstone reads: "For to me to live is Christ, and to die is gain" (Philippians 1:21).

== Ideas ==
Martsinkovsky's theological views were largely shaped during the "Russian Renaissance of the early 20th century," when he attended a Christian student circle led by Pavel Nikolay. His theology was influenced by the works of Pavel Florensky, Nikolay Berdyaev, and Sergey Bulgakov, but he most frequently referenced Vladimir Solovyov in his numerous works.

His ideas, resonating with those of Vladimir Ern, Alexander Yelchaninov, and Ivan Prokhanov, influenced some Christian intellectuals. Martsinkovsky adhered to nondenominational Christianity, prioritizing living experience over dogma. His views, differing from the dominant Russian Orthodox Church perspectives on salvation, baptism, the Church's relation to the state, and military duty, aligned him with evangelical Protestant denominations. He dreamed that an evangelically renewed Orthodoxy, alongside Protestantism, would foster society's spiritual awakening.

=== Society's spiritual renewal ===
Martsinkovsky envisioned Russia and other nations spiritually renewed, free from false idols. In his 1918 lecture "The Gospel and Freedom," he argued that Soviet Russia's new social order required an inner spiritual revolution. "A revolution of structure and forms demands a revolution of the spirit," he stated. "Freedom can lead to anarchy and arbitrariness if given to a person with selfish habits and base instincts." He believed only a morally renewed person could use civil freedom wisely.

"There will be no prisons only when the main cause—sin—is eliminated, whether it's the sin of the imprisoned or those imprisoning," he argued. Sin built the prison from the beginning. Sin is incombustible, and so is the prison". According to Martsinkovsky, spiritual renewal is possible only through the Gospel message of Christ.

=== Baptising by faith ===
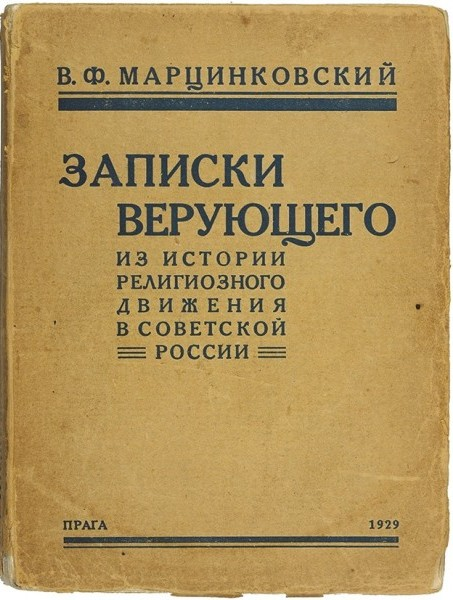
Cover of Vladimir Martsinkovsky's book Notes of a Believer

Baptized as an infant in Orthodoxy, Martsinkovsky began questioning the need for conscious baptism during his book-distributing days. This issue became critical during the 1917 Russian revolutions, the election of the Patriarch, and the 1917–18 Local Council of the Russian Orthodox Church, on which he and other religious figures pinned hopes for church reform.

His views on baptism are detailed in his work Adult Baptism and Orthodoxy. Based on the Holy Scriptures and Holy Tradition, he argued that the principle of "baptism first, then faith" is detrimental, advocating "faith first, then baptism" for any church. He claimed the early apostolic Church practiced only baptism by faith (following regeneration through repentance) and opposed claims of infant baptism at that time.

Martsinkovsky believed baptism without faith fills the Church with spiritually dead individuals, harming the Church. He argued this practice became common only in the 6th century due to the Church's state dominance. He urged the Orthodox Church to abandon baptism without faith.

Before the Local Council of 1917–1918, Martsinkovsky developed and presented a reform plan for the Russian Orthodox Church to Orthodox hierarchs. Beyond advocating baptism by faith, he proposed reading the Gospel in Russian rather than Church Slavonic during services, believing this would promote the Gospel message and conscious faith. He was received by Patriarch Tikhon and discussed with his entourage. His plan was received relatively favorably but was not discussed at the Council.

Based on his convictions, in September 1920, while visiting the German colony Alexandrotal, Martsinkovsky received conscious baptism (baptism by faith) from Mennonite preacher Yakov Tevs. "A boundary was crossed to a new period of spiritual life," he recalled. "At the same time, I did not join any community or declare my exit from Orthodoxy, though I ceased to be an orthodox believer". Nevertheless, he never separated himself from Orthodoxy. Researcher K. Kharchenko noted that Martsinkovsky sought to reconcile Orthodoxy and Protestantism, not organizationally but doctrinally.

=== Separation of Church and State ===
Martsinkovsky believed state interference in Church affairs, as seen in the Russian Empire, was generally harmful. In Notes of a Believer, he cited examples. A village priest confessed to Martsinkovsky that he did not believe in the Liturgy he performed, serving only to "make a living." This attitude drove people from the Church or against it, unable to distinguish which was primary in the Church-state tandem. He cited another "minister of the cult" who, after the revolution, became an anti-religious propagandist in the same village. "It cost him nothing to switch from state religion to state atheism," Martsinkovsky noted.

Separation of Church and state was part of Martsinkovsky's proposed reforms for the Russian Orthodox Church. This separation occurred after the 1917 revolution, but not peacefully or by the Church's initiative.

Politically neutral, Martsinkovsky once described himself as a "theocratic anarchist," explaining that when all believe in Christ, the state would become unnecessary. In Notes of a Believer, he expressed equal sympathy for the White Army and Red Army.

==== Christian Pacifism ====
Martsinkovsky viewed military service as a specific issue of Church-state relations. Based on the Sermon on the Mount, he deemed military service unacceptable for Christians, During World War I, he faced conscription twice but was exempted both times due to health, trusting in God's will. He avoided extreme pacifism. During a post-imprisonment interrogation, he affirmed his pacifist beliefs but clarified he did not engage in anti-militarist propaganda.

In 1919, he faced conscription into the Red Army. A Soviet law exempted those with religious objections to military service, but they had to prove their pacifist beliefs in court. As a formal Orthodox, this was challenging for Martsinkovsky. He succeeded with the help of Baptist presbyter Pavel Pavlov as an expert witness.

=== Views on Salvation ===
External image
- Vladimir Martsinkovsky
- Portrait of Vladimir Martsinkovsky

Early in his Christian journey, Martsinkovsky viewed the Gospel as a set of moral norms, akin to Tolstoyanism. Unable to fulfill all Gospel commandments, he contemplated suicide but was transformed by a sermon on Christ as the path to forgiveness of sins, embracing salvation by "grace through faith" (Ephesians 2:8). This message became a recurring theme in his writings and sermons.

His views on salvation are systematically presented in "Eternal Redemption" (part of the collection Word of Life). He considered salvation irrevocable, regardless of circumstances faced by a regenerated person. He distinguished between "conversion" and "regeneration." He stated, "Not every conversion leads to regeneration. Often, someone touched by our preaching only prays for salvation (partly under our pressure), and we say: you are saved. Yet, only the Holy Spirit can internally confirm salvation, and only a complete moral change for the better in a sinner's life can externally confirm it".

Martsinkovsky believed a saved person cannot lose salvation, though "a regenerated person may fall, though their new nature resists it". A true Christian, he argued, "falling into moral filth, suffers and seeks deliverance" and will not "remain in the dirty puddle". According to researcher Anton Goncharenko, Martsinkovsky's salvation views shifted from Orthodoxy's deference to God's discretion to those typical of evangelical Protestants, particularly Baptists.

== Legacy ==
Some of Martsinkovsky's books and pamphlets were reprinted multiple times and were popular in evangelical churches in the 1990s. Yet, he remains "a little-studied figure", with one article titled Forgotten Righteous. Researcher Konstantin Kharchenko attributes this partly to Martsinkovsky's complex relations with official Christian structures. Confessional historians often mention him "in passing—as an interdenominational figure, belonging to no one," noted researcher M. Cherenkov. However, he believes Martsinkovsky's position should interest those "seeking traces of a grand, universal Reformation".

His "spiritual children" were found across denominations. Metropolitan Anthony of Sourozh recalled: "One cannot erase from my spiritual biography the name of a Baptist. We never met, but I read his books with great interest. This is Vladimir Filimonovich Martsinkovsky. He devoted his life to Christian enlightenment, giving spiritual lectures in various places. His books helped me take a decisive step toward faith and acceptance of Jesus Christ".

== Works ==
- Martsinkovsky, Vladimir (1916). With Him or Against Him? (Based on the Drama "King of the Jews") [С ним или против него? : (По драме «Царь Иудейский»)]. Moscow: Moscow Christian Student Circle. p. 16.
- Martsinkovsky, Vladimir (1916). Forgiveness [Прощение]. Wernigerode: Light in the East. p. 7.
- Martsinkovsky, Vladimir (1920). "Adult Baptism and Orthodoxy" [Крещение взрослых и православие]. (Unknown). Moscow.
- Martsinkovsky, Vladimir (1926). Is the Gospel Reliable? Based on Primary Sources [Достоверно ли Евангелие? : На основании первоисточников]. Prague: (Unknown).
- Martsinkovsky, Vladimir (1926). Science and Religion [Наука и религия]. Prague: (Unknown). p. 46.
- Martsinkovsky, Vladimir (1927). When Will People Become Brothers? [Когда люди станут братьями?]. Wernigerode: Light in the East. p. 46.
- Martsinkovsky, Vladimir (1927). Crucifixion and Resurrection [Распятие и Воскресение]. Author’s edition. p. 30.
- Martsinkovsky, Vladimir (1928). Christ the Coming One: Lecture Delivered in 1920–1927 [Христос грядущий : Лекция, чит. в 1920-1927 г.г.]. Prague: (Unknown). p. 88.
- Martsinkovsky, Vladimir (1929). Notes of a Believer. From the History of the Religious Movement in Russia (1917–1923) [Записки верующего. Из истории Религиозного движения в России (1917-1923)]. Prague: Tiskem «Legiografie». p. 322.
  - Notes of a Believer. Novosibirsk: Christian Publishing House «Staff»; Moscow: Blagovestnik, 1994. 271 p.
  - Notes of a Believer. Saint Petersburg: Christian Society «Bible for All», 1995. 269 p. ISBN 5-7454-0044-7
  - Notes of a Believer: From the History of the Religious Movement in Soviet Russia (1917–1923). Novosibirsk: Staff, 2006. 302 p. ISBN 5-93958-029-7
- Martsinkovsky, Vladimir (1933). Christ and the Jews: Reflections in Light of the Bible and Science, Encounters and Impressions in the USSR, Western Europe, and Palestine [Христос и евреи : размышления в свете Библии и науки, встречи и впечатления в СССР, Западной Европе и Палестине]. Prague: Author’s edition. p. 110.
- Martsinkovsky, Vladimir (1937). Aid for Studying the Gospel of John [Пособие при изучении Евангелия от Иоанна]. Łódź: (Unknown). p. 175.
- Martsinkovsky, Vladimir (1938). Soul Strings: Collection of Poems [Душевные струны: Сборник стихов]. Vilnius: (Unknown).
- Martsinkovsky, Vladimir (1973). Solovyov and the Gospel [Соловьёв и Евангелие] (PDF). Korntal: Light in the East.
- Martsinkovsky, Vladimir (1986). Word of Life. Selected Works [Слово жизни. Избранные произведения]. Ashford (Connecticut): Slavic Missionary Publishing «Sower of Truth».
- Martsinkovsky, Vladimir (1950). The Meaning of Life: Dedicated to Near and Far "Seekers of the City" [Смысл жизни : Посвящается ближ. и дал. «взыскующим града»]. New York: . p. 76.
- Martsinkovsky, Vladimir (1989). The Meaning of Suffering [Смысл страдания]. Korntal: Light in the East. p. 54.
- Martsinkovsky, Vladimir. Atheism and Culture in Modern Russia [Атеизм и культура в современной России]. Wernigerode: Light in the East. p. 10.
- Martsinkovsky, Vladimir. The Essence of Christianity [Сущность христианства]. Rivne. p. 22.
- Martsinkovsky, Vladimir. Christ and the Rabbis [Христос и раввины]. Ulm: Light in the East. p. 30.

== Bibliography ==
- Borodinskaya, L. (2016). "Українські штрихи до портрета Марцинковського" [Ukrainian Strokes to the Portrait of Martsinkovsky]. Bogomysliye (almanac) (in Ukrainian). 19. Odesa: 146–165. ISSN 0135-5473.
- Gololob, G. A. "Вечное искупление по Марцинковскому. Ответ на статью В. Ф. Марцинковского «Вечное искупление»" [Eternal Redemption according to Martsinkovsky: Response to the Article by V. F. Martsinkovsky "Eternal Redemption"] (in Russian).
- Goncharenko, A. (2016). "Богословские взгляды Владимира Филимоновича Марцинковского" [Theological Views of Vladimir Filimonovich Martsinkovsky]. Bogomysliye (almanac) (in Russian). 19. Odesa: 220–237. ISSN 0135-5473.
- Grachev, Yu. S. (1997). Студенческие годы : Повесть о студенческом христианском движении в России [Student Years: A Story about the Student Christian Movement in Russia] (in Russian). St. Petersburg: Bible for All. ISBN 5-7454-0097-8.
- История ЕХБ в СССР [History of Evangelical Christians and Baptists in the USSR] (in Russian). Moscow: All-Union Council of Evangelical Christians and Baptists. 1989.
- Kahle, Wilhelm (1978). Evangelische Christen in Russland und der Sovetunion [Sowjetunion]. Ivan Stepanovich Prochanov (1869—1935) und der Weg der Evangeliumschristen und Baptisten. Von Wilhelm Kahle (in Russian). Translated by Skvortsova, P. I. Oncken - Wuppertal and Kassel.
- Kovalenko, L. E. (2006). "Martsinkovsky Vladimir Filimonovich (1884–1971). 3rd edition". Cloud of Christ's Witnesses for the Peoples of Russia in the 19th–20th Centuries (in Russian). Kyiv: Center for Christian Cooperation. pp. 204–207.
- Podkolzina, O. I. (2013). Особенности миссионерской проповеди В. Ф. Марцинковского детям и молодёжи в начале XX века (1884–1971) [Features of the Missionary Preaching of V. F. Martsinkovsky to Children and Youth at the Beginning of the 20th Century (1884–1971)] (PDF) (in Russian). Moscow: St. Philaret Orthodox Christian Institute. p. 77. Archived from the original (PDF) on 2018-01-04.
- Popov, V. A. (2016a). "Вторая родина Владимира Марцинковского" [The Second Homeland of Vladimir Martsinkovsky]. Bogomysliye (almanac) (in Russian). 19. Odesa: 197–208. ISSN 0135-5473.
- Popov, V. A. (2004). "Забытый праведник. Владимир Марцинковский был постоянным оппонентом Луначарского в спорах о религии" [The Forgotten Righteous Man: Vladimir Martsinkovsky Was a Constant Opponent of Lunacharsky in Debates about Religion]. NG Religion (in Russian). Vol. 15, no. 145. p. 6.
- Popov, V. A. (2016b). "О «Пособии при изучении Евангелия от Иоанна»" [On the "Manual for Studying the Gospel of John"]. Bogomysliye (almanac) (in Russian). 19. Odesa: 209–213. ISSN 0135-5473.
- Sokolova, N. N. (2001). Sergiy (ed.). Под кровом Всевышнего [Under the Shelter of the Most High] (in Russian). Under the general editorship of Sergiy (Sokolov), Bishop of Novosibirsk and Berdsk. Moscow: Publishing House of the Orthodox Brotherhood of St. Apostle John the Theologian.
- Kharchenko, K. (2016). "Учитель словесности Владимир Марцинковский (1884—1971)" [Literature Teacher Vladimir Martsinkovsky (1884–1971)]. Bogomysliye (almanac) (in Russian). 19. Odesa: 166–196. ISSN 0135-5473.
- Cherenkov, M. (2016). "Евангельская Реформация и будущее христианства: проект Владимира Марцинковского" [Evangelical Reformation and the Future of Christianity: The Project of Vladimir Martsinkovsky]. Theological Reflections: Euro-Asian Journal of Theology (in Russian). 17: 168–179. doi:10.29357/issn.2521-179X.2016.17.168. ISSN 2415-783X.
- Shevelev, V. "Он думал о своей родине, он любил её людей" [He Thought about His Homeland, He Loved Its People]. Voice of Truth (in Russian).
