= Vvedensky, Belgorod Oblast =

Coordinates: 50°46′36″N 35°53′46″E

Vvedensky (Russian: Введенский) is a rural locality (a khutor) in Rakityansky District of Belgorod Oblast, Russia, located 8 kilometers (5.0 mi) from the urban-type settlement of Rakitnoye, the administrative center of the district.
