= Vedensky (inhabited locality) =

Vedensky (Russian: Веденский; masculine), Vedenskaya (Веденская; feminine), or Vedenskoye (Веденское; neuter) is the name of several rural localities in Russia:

- Vedensky (rural locality), a settlement in Soskovsky District of Oryol Oblast
- Vedenskoye, a village in Danilovsky District of Yaroslavl Oblast

== See also ==
- Vvedensky (rural locality)
