= Vvedenskoye, Kursk Oblast =

Rural locality in Kursk Oblast, Russia

Vvedenskoye Введенское
- Selo
- Interactive map of Vvedenskoye
- Location of Vvedenskoye Vvedenskoye (Kursk Oblast)
- Coordinates: 51°40′28″N 36°21′25″E
- Country: Russia
- Federal subject: Kursk Oblast
- Administrative district: Kursky District
- SelsovietSelsoviet: Shumakovsky

Population (2010 Census)
  - Total: 642
  - Estimate (2010): 642 (0%)

Municipal status
  - Municipal district: Kursky Municipal District
  - Rural settlement: Shumakovsky Selsoviet Rural Settlement
- Time zone: UTC+3 (MSK)
- Postal code: 305541
- Dialing code: +7 4712
- OKTMO ID: 38620488106
- Website: shumakovo.rkursk.ru

Vvedenskoye (Russian: Введенское) is a rural locality (Russian: село, lit. 'village') in Shumakovsky Selsoviet Rural Settlement, Kursky District, Kursk Oblast, Russia. Population: 642 (2010 census); 694 (2002 census);

== Geography ==
The village is located on the Mlodat River (a left tributary of the Seym), 96 km from the Russia–Ukraine border, 10 km south-east of the district center – the town Kursk, 1 km from the selsoviet center – Bolshoye Shumakovo.

Climate

Vvedenskoye has a warm-summer humid continental climate (Dfb in the Köppen climate classification).

== Transport ==
Vvedenskoye is located on the road of regional importance 38K-019 (Kursk – Bolshoye Shumakovo – Polevaya via Lebyazhye), in the vicinity of the railway station Konaryovo (railway line Klyukva — Belgorod).

The rural locality is situated 10 km from Kursk Vostochny Airport, 114 km from Belgorod International Airport and 198 km from Voronezh Peter the Great Airport.
