= Alexander Vvedensky (born 1870) =

Imperial Russian Army colonel (1870–1920)

Alexander Nikolaevich Vvedensky
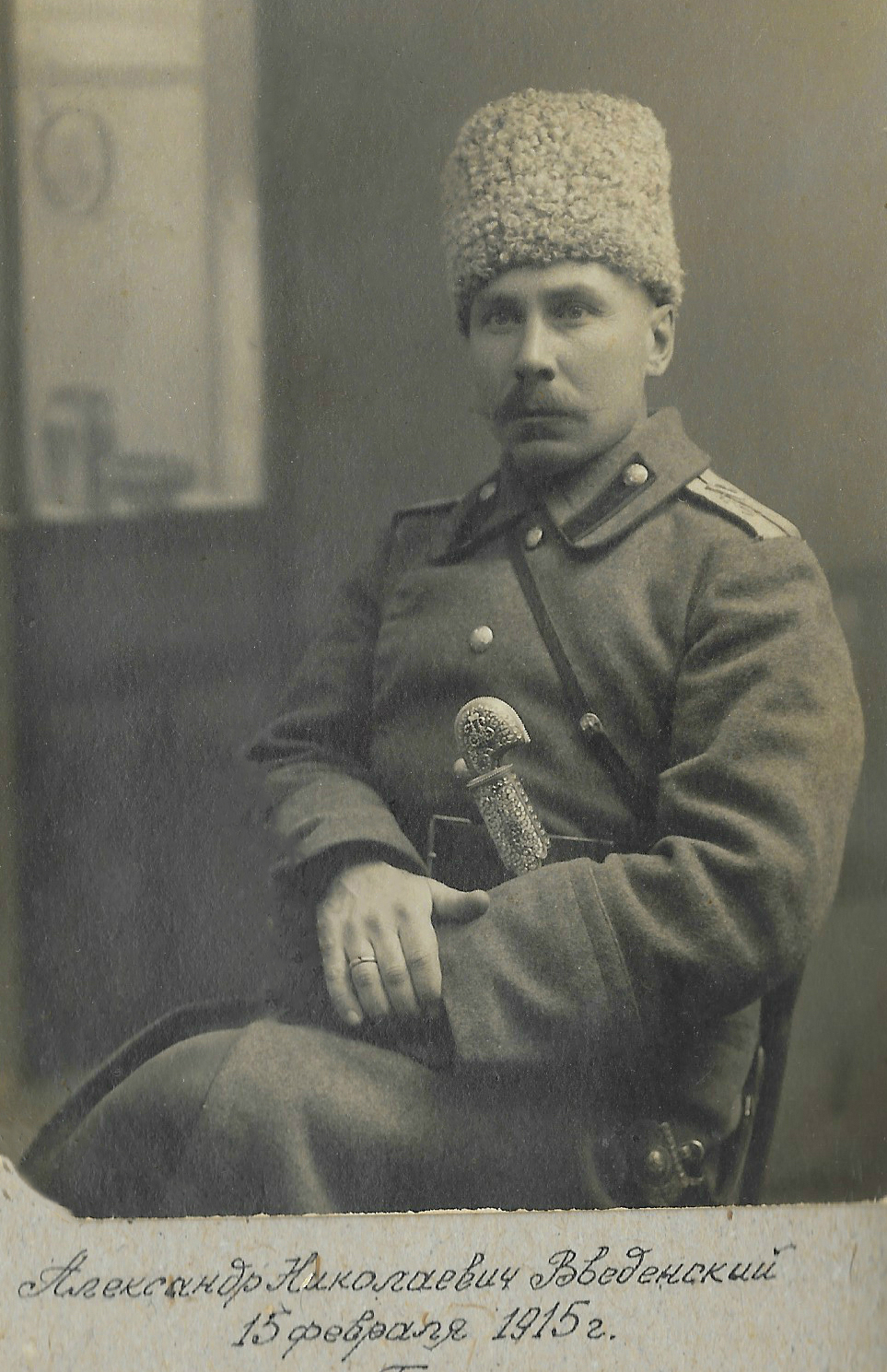
- Vvedensky in 1915
- Born: 3 April 1870; Orenburg, Russian Empire
- Died: 12 September 1920 (aged 50); Baku, Azerbaijan SSR
- Military career
- Allegiance: Russian Empire (Russia) White Movement
- Branch: Imperial Russian Army; Volunteer Army
- Service years: 1906–1917; 1918–1920
- Conflicts: World War I Russian Civil War

Alexander Nikolaevich Vvedensky (Russian: Александр Николаевич Введенский; 3 April 1870 – 12 September 1920) was an Imperial Russian Army colonel who participated in World War I, and later the White movement in the Volunteer Army and Armed Forces of South Russia.

== Early life ==
Vvedensky was born on 3 April 1870, in Orenburg, Orenburg Governorate, Russian Empire. He lived in Grozny, in Terek Oblast. He attended military school at the Neplyuevsky Cadet Corps and Paul's Military School.

== Military ==
He served in the Imperial Russian Army during World War I. Following the Russian Revolution, he joined the Whites and served in the Russian Civil War. He served in the Volunteer Army and Armed Forces of South Russia. He was captured and sentenced to death by firing squad on 12 September 1920 by the Special Department of the 11th Army in Baku. His brother, General Valentin Vvedensky, also shared the same fate. He was rehabilitated on 22 May 1992.

== Awards ==
- Order of St. Stanislaus with swords, 2nd and 3rd Class.
- Order of St. Anna, 2nd and 3rd Class, with swords and a bow, with the inscription "For Bravery."
- Order St. Vladimir, 4th Class, with swords and a bow.
