= Joint State Political Directorate =

Intelligence agency of the USSR (1923–1934)

- Объединённое государственное политическое управление при СНК СССР
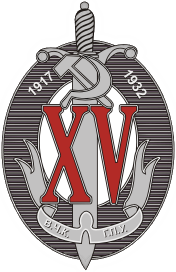
- Badge commemorating 15 years of the Cheka–OGPU, issued in 1932

Agency overview
- Formed: 15 November 1923; 102 years ago
- Preceding agency: GPU
- Dissolved: 10 July 1934; 92 years ago
- Superseding agencies: NKVD; GUGB
- Type: Secret police Intelligence agency
- Headquarters: 11-13 ulitsa Bol. Lubyanka, Moscow, RSFSR, USSR
- Agency executives: Felix Dzerzhinsky (1923–1926); Vyacheslav Menzhinsky (1926–1934); Genrikh Yagoda (1934)
- Parent agency: Council of People's Commissars

The Joint State Political Directorate (Russian: Объединённое государственное политическое управление, IPA: [ɐbjɪdʲɪˈnʲɵn(ː)əjə ɡəsʊˈdarstvʲɪn(ː)əjə pəlʲɪˈtʲitɕɪskəjə ʊprɐˈvlʲenʲɪje]), abbreviated as OGPU (Russian: ОГПУ), was the secret police of the Soviet Union from November 1923 to July 1934, succeeding the State Political Directorate (GPU). Responsible to the Council of People's Commissars, the OGPU was headed by Felix Dzerzhinsky until 1926, then by Vyacheslav Menzhinsky until replaced by the Main Directorate of State Security (GUGB) within the People's Commissariat for Internal Affairs (NKVD).

The OGPU played an important role in the Soviet Union's forced collectivization of agriculture under the leadership of Joseph Stalin, crushing resistance and deporting millions of peasants to the growing network of Gulag forced labor camps. The OGPU operated both inside and outside the country, persecuting political criminals and opponents of the Bolsheviks such as White émigrés, Soviet dissidents, and anti-communists.

== History ==
=== Founding ===
Following the formation of the Soviet Union in December 1922, the ruling Russian Communist Party (Bolsheviks) saw the need for a unified intelligence service to exercise control over state security throughout the new union. At the time, the State Political Directorate (GPU) served as the secret police for the Russian Socialist Federative Soviet Republic (RSFSR) and was successor to the Cheka. It was responsible to the Council of People's Commissars, which functioned as the highest executive body of the Soviet Union after the formation.

On 15 November 1923, the GPU was dissolved and reformed into the Joint State Political Directorate (OGPU) with its jurisdiction covering the entirety of the Soviet Union. Its official full name was the Joint State Political Directorate under the Council of People's Commissars of the USSR (Объединённое государственное политическое управление при СНК СССР, Ob"yedinyonnoye gosudarstvennoye politicheskoye upravleniye pri SNK SSSR), though the name is also translated as the All-Union State Political Administration or as Unified State Political Directorate. Felix Dzerzhinsky, who had served as the chairman of the State Political Directorate and of the Cheka, was appointed as the OGPU's first chief.

The OSNAZ (ОСНАЗ), a militarised section of the Cheka, had originated in 1921; it became a component of OGPU.

Jews constituted around 15.1% of the OGPU's leading officials in 1918 and half of the members of its collegium.

=== Operations ===
The OGPU, like the GPU before it, was in theory supposed to operate with more restraint than the Cheka, which had orchestrated the Red Terror from 1918 to 1922. Unlike the Cheka, the OGPU could not shoot "counter-revolutionaries" at will, and most suspected political criminals had to be brought before a judge. The OGPU's powers increased greatly in 1926, when the Soviet criminal code was amended to include Article 58, a section on anti-state terrorism. The provisions were vaguely written and very broadly interpreted. Even before then, OGPU had set up tribunals to try the most exceptional cases of terrorism, usually without calling any witnesses. In time, the OGPU's de facto powers grew even greater than those of the Cheka. The OGPU achieved perhaps its most spectacular success with the Trust Operation of 1924–1925. OGPU agents contacted White émigrés and anti-communists in Western Europe and pretended to represent a large group, known as "the Trust", working to overthrow the communist régime. Exiled Russians gave "the Trust" large sums of money and supplies, as did foreign intelligence agencies. Soviet agents finally succeeded in luring one of the leading anti-communist operators, Sidney Reilly, into Russia to meet with the Trust. Once in the Soviet Union in September 1925, Reilly was arrested and executed. The Trust was then dissolved, having become a huge propaganda success. Dzerzhinsky died in 1926 and was succeeded as chief of the OGPU by deputy chairman Vyacheslav Menzhinsky.

From 1927 to 1929, the OGPU engaged in intensive investigations of an opposition coup d'etat. Soviet leader Joseph Stalin issued a public decree that any and all opposition views should be considered dangerous and gave the OGPU the authority to seek out "hostile elements." That led in March 1928 to the Shakhty Trial, which saw the prosecution of a group of supposed industrial saboteurs allegedly involved in a hostile conspiracy. That would be the first of many trials during Stalin's rule. The OGPU planned and set up the Gulag system, and also became the Soviet government's arm for the persecution of the Russian Orthodox Church, the Greek Catholics, the Roman Catholic Church, Islam and other religious organizations, in an operation headed by Yevgeny Tuchkov. The OGPU was also the principal secret police agency responsible for the detection, arrest, and liquidation of anarchists and other dissident left-wing factions in the early Soviet Union. It also enforced the Dekulakization campaigns during the First Five-Year Plan through extrajudicial special troikas of local OGPU agents, Communist Party officials, and state procurators with the authority to sentence suspects to exile or death without a formal trial in the Soviet judicial system. OGPU troops took part in Soviet invasion of Xinjiang.

=== Dissolution ===
Menzhinsky's health had deteriorated rapidly during his directorship of the OGPU and Stalin tended to deal with his first deputy, Genrikh Yagoda, who essentially took over as head in the late 1920s. Menzhinsky spent his last years as an invalid until his death in May 1934, for which Yagoda would later be blamed in the Trial of the Twenty One.

In July 1934, two months after Menzhinsky's death, the OGPU was dissolved and reincorporated into the People's Commissariat for Internal Affairs (NKVD), the newly created interior ministry of the Soviet Union, becoming its Main Directorate of State Security (GUGB) under the leadership of Yagoda. The OGPU would later be transformed into the more widely known Committee for State Security (KGB) in 1954.

== See also ==
- Bibliography of the Russian Revolution and Civil War § Violence and terror
- Bibliography of Stalinism and the Soviet Union § Terror, famine and the Gulag
- Chronology of Soviet secret police agencies
- Eastern Bloc politics
