= Alexander Vvedensky (religious leader) =

Soviet era Russian religious leader

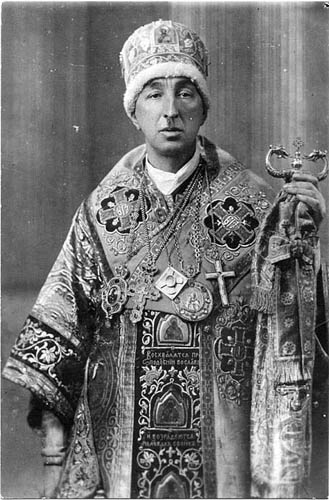
A photograph of Vvedensky, taken sometime in the 1930s.

Alexander Ivanovich Vvedensky (Russian: Алекса́ндр Ива́нович Введе́нский; August 30, 1889 – July 26, 1946) was one of the leaders and ideologues of the Renovationism, a reform movement inside the Russian Orthodox Church during the Soviet Union. He is considered the person "most identified with renovationism in the Soviet era".

== Background ==
Vvedensky's paternal grandfather was according to unclear data a Jewish convert to the Russian Orthodox Church and served as a psalmist (cantor) in the Diocese of Novgorod. In the process of converting his grandfather changed his surname to Vvedenskii after Vvedenie, the feast of the Presentation of the Virgin. Alexander's mother was a member of the provincial bourgeoisie and his father was raised in the Russian nobility and was the headmaster of a school at Vitebsk.

Vvedensky was born in Vitebsk in 1889. He graduated from the History department of St. Petersburg University in 1913. While a student at St. Petersburg, he played the piano and frequented the salon of Dmitry Merezhkovsky and Zinaida Gippius, important figures in the symbolist movement. With their encouragement, he wrote an article entitled "Reasons for Non-belief among the Russian Intelligentsia", published in the journal Palomnik, finding that the two main reasons for non-belief were

1. The disparity between Christian theology and scientism and
2. The allegedly reactionary nature of the Orthodox clergy.

His desire to bridge the gap between religion and science and be an apologist and reformer of the church is seen throughout his subsequent career.

Vvedensky decided to enter the priesthood in 1910 and, as unmarried priests were forced to take monastic vows, he married prior to his ordination, though accusations of marital infidelity plagued him for the rest of his life. He received a diploma from the St. Petersburg Spiritual Academy in 1914, but was refused ordination due to his Jewish background and perception in intellectualism. He was finally ordained by the head Chaplain of the Army, Georgy Shavelsky, as a regimental chaplain in July 1914. He served as a regimental chaplain for two years before being assigned as Chaplain of the Nicholas Cavalry College in Petrograd in 1916.

== Vvedensky in 1922–1923 ==
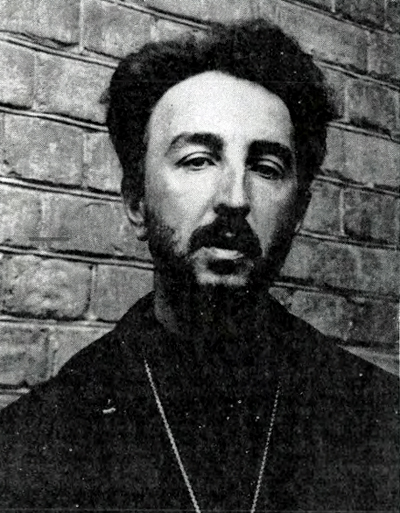
Fr. Vvedensky in 1924

In May 1922, Vvedensky and group of priests named the Living Church (Russian: Живая церковь) were brought to Moscow with the assistance of the GPU. Vvedensky and two others met on May 10 in the Grebnevsky Church on Lubyanka Square with the church's pastor, fr. Sergei Kalinovsky. They agreed to collaborate for the support among the Moscow clergy. Simultaneously supporting Archbishop Antonin Granovsky, the head of the movement to gain adherents in the provinces. The other goal of their agenda was to arrange the meeting with the Patriarch Tikhon in an effort to end what they saw as counterrevolutionary activity on the part of the Church. They typed up an appeal at the Revolutionary Military Council which was certified by Trotsky's personal secretary and, on May 12, distributed by Stalin to the Politburo, which approved it – in fact, the only type-written archival copy was signed by Stalin, Zinoviev, Kamenev, Molotov, Mikhail Tomsky, and Aleksey Rykov.

The same evening of the Politburo meeting, Vvedensky with several other renovationist priests confronted Patriarch Tikhon, at that time under his house arrest, with evidence that his anti-Soviet activities were leading to chaos in the Church. Tikhon denied such anti-Soviet activity, but readily agreed to step down from the patriarchal throne, and handed authority temporarily over to Metropolitan Agathangel (Preobrazhensky) of Yaroslavl until the new council could be convened to elect a new patriarch. Several days later, they got Tikhon to agree that the patriarchal chancellery should be run by the Living Church priests, yet he stipulated to have that be overseen by other two bishops. However, upon leaving the meeting, Vvedensky reported publicly that the Patriarch had approved the 1923 renovationist's local council as being the proper church administration until the local council could be convened for the election of a new Patriarch. Bishop Antonin (Granovsky) was proclaimed the president of the Supreme Ecclesiastical Administration (Russian: Высшее церковное управление) with Vvedensky as the vice-president.

When Vvedensky met with Metropolitan Benjamin (Kazansky) of Petrograd in late May, the metropolitan refused to accept the Supreme Ecclesiastical Administration as the rightful administration of the church without direct instructions from the Patriarch. In a letter to all parishes in his diocese, Metropolitan Benjamin forbade Vvedensky and other renovationist priests from performing the sacraments before they had repented before him. That led to the arrest of Metropolitan Benjamin the next day after the letter was released, and Vvedensky's presence at that arrest was compared with Judas Iscariot at the arrest of Christ. Bishop Alexy (Simansky), who temporarily managed the diocese during the absence of Metropolitan Benjamin, restored Vvedensky and the others to their rights on June 4 under the pressure from the GPU, which threatened to execute Benjamin.

He was supposed to be a witness for the prosecution against Metropolitan Benjamin, but at the very beginning of the trial he was wounded in the head by a stone thrown at him. After that, he dropped out of church life for 2 months. Returning to activity, he discovered a sharp antagonism between the two leaders of the Renovationist schism - Metropolitan Antonin (Granovsky) and Vladimir Krasnitsky. This conflict led to a split in the "Living Church". Metropolitan Antonin (Granovsky) on 20 August 1922 creates another association within Renovationist schism, named "Union for Church Revival". After the failure of negotiations with Antonin (Granovsky), Vvedensky created Renovationist association, named "Union of the Communities of the Ancient Apostolic Church" (SODATs), headed it, wrote its program documents, and thanks to his fame, he contributed to the opening of its branches in many regions of the USSR.

== Vvedensky as Head of the Living Church, 1923-1946 ==
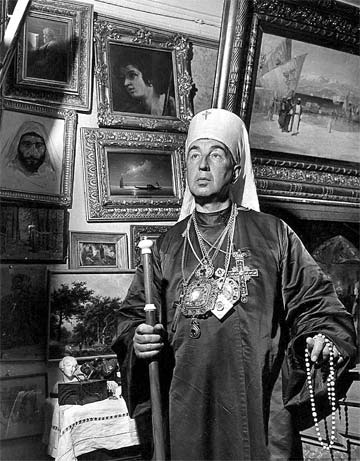
Vvedensky in 1941

After dissolution of SODATs and forming Renovationist Synod on 8 August 1923, Vvedensky became its permanent member. During that time he adopted a series of titles — Metropolitan; Apologete; Evangelizer; Deputy of the First Hierarch.

On October 10, 1941, he was named as the "First Hierarch of the Russian Orthodox Church in the USSR" with the title of "His Holiness and Beatitude, the Great Lord and Father" (Russian: "Святейший и Блаженнейший Великий Господин и Отец") and in essence the head of the Living Church. He attempted to have himself named as the Patriarch, but that was never accepted by the majority of the church and by December of that year, he reverted to his less representative title of Metropolitan.

With Stalin's concordat with the "Patriarchal" Russian Orthodox Church after his meeting with Metropolitan Sergey on September 8, 1943, the Living Church lost the support of the Soviet authorities and the rest of the faithful. Many clergy were allowed back into their respective churches at the rank they had before joining the Living Church, except for Vvedensky, who as the "founding father" of the schism, would only be received back into the Russian Orthodox Church if he agreed to return as a lay member, not a priest. He refused, and died unreconciled.

== Personal life ==
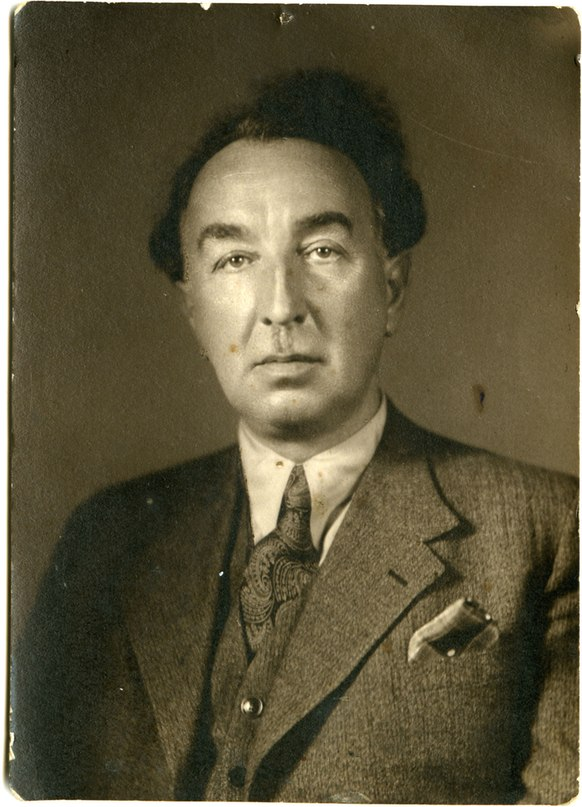
Vvedensky in the 1930s.

Vvedensky was married twice and had five children. As a member of the "white clergy" (married clergy), he was canonically forbidden to enter the episcopate, which in the Eastern Church is made up of the "black clergy" (monastic clergy). (The exception to this is when a white priest becomes a widower: he is not allowed to remarry and is expected to become a monk). Vvedensky also shaved his beard later in life, something not traditionally done by Orthodox clergymen. Margaret Bourke-White took a series of pictures of "the New Metropolitan of Moscow" during her visit to Moscow in 1941 and they were published in Life Magazine (Oct 13, 1941, p.116-117).

Vvedensky died of a stroke on July 26, 1946, and is buried at the Kalitnikov Cemetery in Moscow, with his mother, Zinaida Savvishna.
