= Yevgeny Tuchkov =

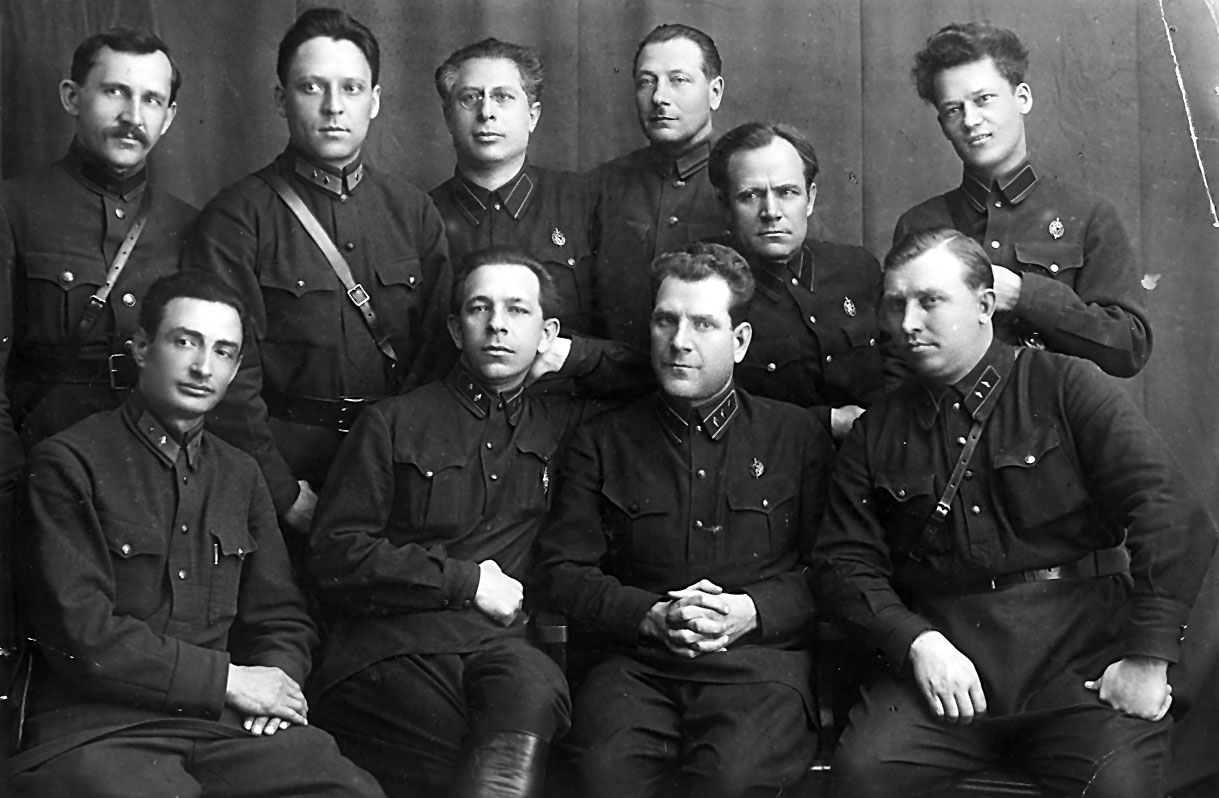
Yevgeny Tuchkov (first row, second from right) among the staff of the OGPU plenipotentiary office in the Urals.

Yevgeny Aleksandrovich Tuchkov (Russian Евгений Александрович Тучков; 1892, Suzdal, Vladimir Governorate – 15 April, 1957, Moscow) was a Soviet state security officer and the head of the anti-religious department of the Soviet OGPU.

Tuchkov was born in 1892 in the village of Teliakovo near Suzdal. He finished four years of primary education after which he worked as a baker and also in a leather shop. He then served in the Russian Imperial Army as a secretary.

In 1917, after the Russian Revolution, Tuchkov joined the Bolsheviks and in 1918, the Cheka. From 1922 to 1929 Tuchkov headed the sixth secret department of the OGPU which targeted the Russian Orthodox Church during the 1920s.

During this period, Tuchkov orchestrated a campaign of persecution against the church which included the mass arrests and executions of clergy. He personally led the questioning of Patriarch Tikhon. He had also begun supporting the liberal and modernist Living Church movement, seeking to make it a replacement for traditional Russian Orthodoxy.

In 1928, Tuchkov enrolled in Moscow State University but dropped out a year later. In 1939, Tuchkov was fired from the NKVD, whereupon he began working as a lecturer for the society "Knowledge". He died in early 1957.
