= Christian University =

Christian University may refer to:

== Indonesia ==
- Artha Wacana Christian University, Kupang, East Nusa Tenggara
- Duta Wacana Christian University (Universitas Kristen Duta Wacana), Yogyakarta, Java
- Maranatha Christian University, Bandung, West Java
- Petra Christian University, Surabaya, East Java
- Satya Wacana Christian University, Salatiga, Central Java

== Japan ==
- Ibaraki Christian University, Hitachi, Ibaraki
- International Christian University, Mitaka, Tokyo
- Tokyo Woman's Christian University, Tokyo

== Kenya ==
- Pan Africa Christian University, Nairobi, Kenya
- Scott Christian University, Machakos, Kenya

== Hong Kong ==
- Hong Kong Baptist University, Kowloon Tong, Kowloon, Hong Kong
- Chung Chi College of the Chinese University of Hong Kong, Sha Tin, New Territories, Hong Kong

== Philippines ==
- Filamer Christian University, Roxas City, Capiz, Philippines
- Philippine Christian University, Ermita, Manila, Philippines

== Taiwan ==
- Chang Jung Christian University, Gueiren District, Tainan
- Chung Yuan Christian University, Zhongli District, Taoyuan City

== United States ==
- Heritage Christian University, Florence, Alabama
- Arizona Christian University, Phoenix, Arizona
- California State Christian University, Los Angeles, California
- Colorado Christian University, Lakewood, Colorado
- Lincoln Christian University, Lincoln, Illinois
- Indiana Christian University, Noblesville, Indiana
- Kentucky Christian University, Grayson, Kentucky
- Louisiana Christian University, Pineville, Louisiana
- Cincinnati Christian University, Cincinnati, Ohio
- Ohio Christian University, Circleville, Ohio
- Mid-America Christian University, Oklahoma City, Oklahoma
- Oklahoma Christian University, Oklahoma City, Oklahoma
- Southwestern Christian University, Oklahoma City, Oklahoma
- Northwest Christian University, Eugene, Oregon
- Mid-Atlantic Christian University, Elizabeth City, North Carolina
- University of Mary Hardin-Baylor, Belton, Texas
- Abilene Christian University, Abilene, Texas
- Houston Christian University, Houston, Texas
- Texas Christian University, Fort Worth, Texas
- Lubbock Christian University, Lubbock, Texas

== Other places ==
- Christian Service University College, Kumasi, Ghana
- Martin Luther Christian University, Shillong, Meghalaya, India
- Dimitrie Cantemir Christian University, Bucharest, Romania
- St. Petersburg Christian University, St. Petersburg, Russia
- Uganda Christian University, Mukono, Uganda
- International Christian University – Kyiv, Kiev, Ukraine
- Southern Christian University (disambiguation)

== See also ==
- Christian college
- Council for Christian Colleges and Universities
- Christian Albrechts University
- Christian Brothers University (Memphis, Tennessee)
- University Christian School
