= Ivan Prokhanov =

Russian and Soviet religious figure, engineer, poet and politician

Ivan Stepanovich Prokhanov
- Иван Степанович Проханов
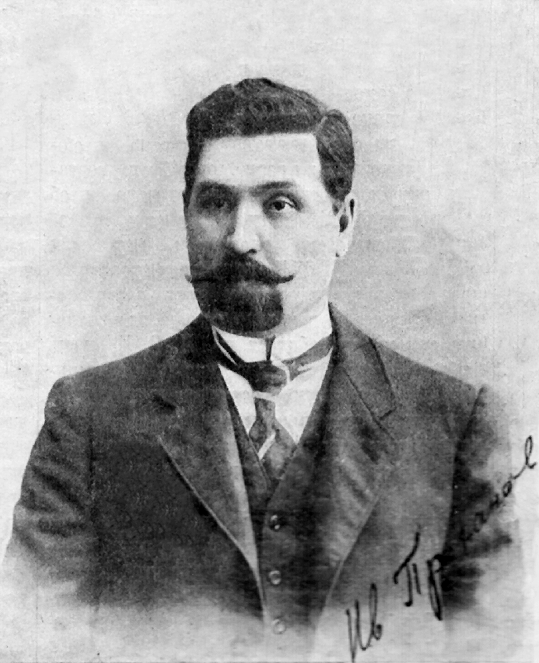
- 1st Chairman of the All-Union Council of Evangelical Christians (1911–1931) and Vice President of the Baptist World Alliance (1911–1928)
- Born: 17 April 1869; Vladikavkaz, Russian Empire
- Died: 6 October 1935 (aged 66); Berlin, Nazi Germany
- Education: Higher technical degree, theological degree
- Occupations: engineer; poet; religious figure
- Children: Yaroslav Prokhhanov; Vsevolod Prokhanov

Ivan Stepanovich Prokhanov (April 17 (29), 1869 – October 6, 1935) was a Russian, Soviet, and emigre religious figure, engineer, poet, preacher, (Note: Contrary to the frequent assertion that the ordination was performed by representatives of the Czech Brethren, the act of ordination speaks of "representatives of the Brethren Union of Helčický, which is a branch of the Baptist World Alliance, and presbyters of the Czech Brethren Evangelical Church".) theologian, and politician. Brother of the Molokan theologian Aleksandr Prokhanov, father of the botanist Yaroslav Prokhanov, great-uncle of the writer Alexander Prokhanov.

Ivan Prokhanov dreamed of a "revolution of the Holy Spirit" that would transform not only religious but also political and economic life in Russia and around the world. To unite Christians, he initiated the creation of the interdenominational Russian Evangelical Union. Then, out of the amorphous Pashkov's followers movement, he built an independent confession — the All-Russian Union of Evangelical Christians, developed its dogmatic theology, organised a "Christian Komsomol", wrote more than 1000 spiritual psalms and created an original tradition of church music.

He published evangelical magazines, wrote books on theology and religious jurisprudence, founded Christian political parties, and opened training schools for church ministers. After the Bolsheviks came to power, Prokhanov became an ideologue and inspirer for the creation of Christian communities. Joseph Stalin's personal intervention prevented him from realizing the project of the Soviet City of the Sun — Evangelsk.

He had been in exile since 1928 and organized evangelical Christian emigrants into another denominational association.

== Biography ==
=== Origins ===
Ivan Prokhanov was born in Vladikavkaz on April 17, 1869. Prokhanov's parents were Molokans, peasants from the villages of Kopeny and Slastukha, Atkarsky uyezd, Saratov Governorate. In 1862, at the age of 20, his father, Stepan Antonovich Prokhanov, moved to Vladikavkaz with his wife, mother and mother-in-law to escape religious persecution. Later, when the Prokhanovs had sons, their grandmothers told them how they were persecuted for their faith, how they were arrested and imprisoned.

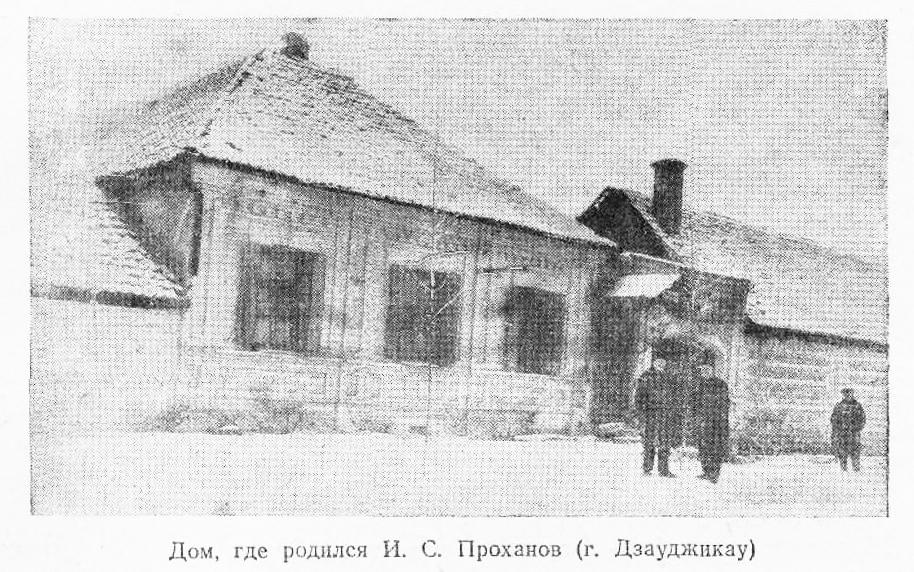
The house where Ivan Prokhanov was born in Vladikavkaz

In Vladikavkaz, Stepan Antonovich achieved material prosperity, acquired four mills and land, and became a member of the city council. In 1875 he joined a group of Baptists and later became an elder of the local church. He corresponded with Vasily Pashkov. In 1894 Stepan Antonovich, along with other Baptists, was exiled to Transcaucasia on charges of spreading harmful religious propaganda. His son Ivan was at that time living in the Christian community of "Vertograd" in the Crimea. In 1899 Ivan visited his father in the place of exile — in the Armenian village of Goris. After his exile ended, Stepan Antonovich returned to Vladikavkaz. He died in 1910. His wife outlived him by 22 years and died at the age of 90 on August 5, 1932 in Moscow.

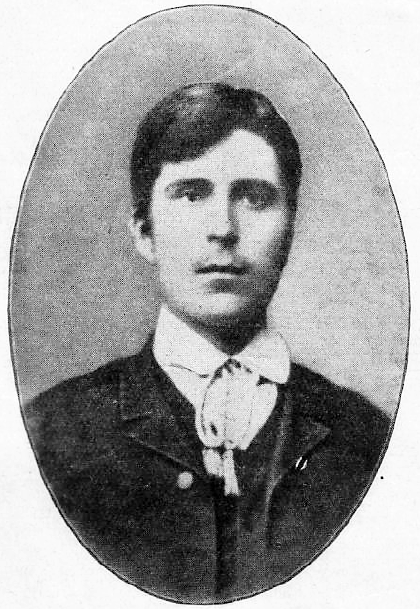
Ivan Prokhanov in his youth

=== Youth ===
In his youth, Ivan joined a circle of school students. They were fascinated by the works of the pessimistic philosophers Schopenhauer and Hartmann. Under their influence he even contemplated suicide, but the result of his spiritual search was rooting in the Christian faith. In November 1886, Ivan began to visit the same Baptist congregation as his father, and on January 17, 1887, he joined the congregation. (Note: Unbaptized persons join Baptist churches through water baptism.)

Ivan graduated from the gymnasium in 1887 and studied engineering at the Saint Petersburg State Institute of Technology in 1888-1893, while actively participating in the activities of the Pashkovites. In 1889, together with his brother Alexander, he began to illegally publish the first evangelical magazine "Beseda".

After graduating from the institute, Ivan got a job as assistant director of a sugar factory in Chernigov province, on the estate of Nikolai Neplyuev, the founder of the Holy Cross Orthodox Workers' Brotherhood. However, due to the difference in religious views with Neplyuev, Ivan Prokhanov was soon forced to leave this job and moved to Kolpino to work as the assistant chief engineer of the Izhorskiye Factories.

The state policy of persecution of Protestants in Russia led Prokhanov to leave his professional activity. In 1894, together with the evangelical figure Herman Fast, the widow of the poet Nekrasov and other believers, he organized the Christian community "Vertograd" in the Crimea, where he lived for about a year.

=== Studying abroad ===
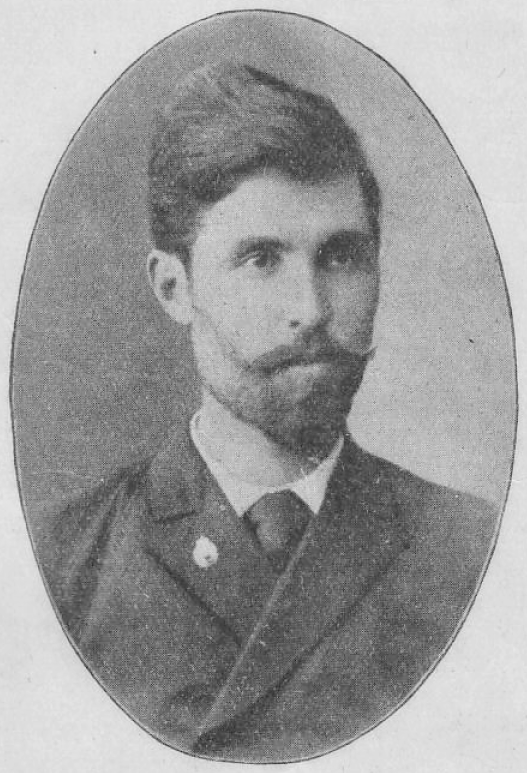
Ivan Prokhanov as a young man

Under threat of arrest for his religious activities, Prokhanov traveled abroad illegally in 1895. Here he received theological training for about two years at a Baptist college in Bristol, England, and then at a Congregationalist church in London. He also spent six months each at the University of Berlin and the University of Paris, where he also studied theology. During his time abroad, Ivan Prokhanov established contacts among European Protestants.

In 1898, Prokhanov was invited to work as an interpreter for a large group of Dukhobors on the island of Cyprus. In Russia the Dukhobors were persecuted for their pacifist beliefs, and as a result a large number of them emigrated by religious reasons in an organized way to Canada. On the way, a large group of Dukhobors fell ill with a disease similar to dysentery and landed in Cyprus. Prokhanov supervised their camp for several weeks, then fell ill himself and, after recovering, decided to return to Russia. Contrary to fears about the consequences of leaving Russia illegally, Prokhanov was not punished upon his return, although he was initially placed under official police surveillance.

=== Service in Russia ===
From the time of his return to Russia in late 1898 until 1921, Prokhanov worked as a full-time engineer and in his spare time was involved in Christian ministry. After his return, Prokhanov lived in Vladikavkaz for a while, then found a job in his specialty as assistant manager of the Riga-Oryol Railroad and moved to Riga. He then worked at the Riga Polytechnic Institute, but in 1901, at the request of the Ministry of Internal Affairs, he was expelled from work as one of the leaders of the "Stundists". Prokhanov moved to St. Petersburg, where he took a job at the Westinghouse Electric Corporation. Here, despite the censorship, he managed to publish a collection of liturgical psalms "Gusli (hymns collection)" (the author of some of these psalms was Prokhanov himself).

On August 31, 1901, he married Anna Ivanovna Kazakova, the daughter of a Christian from Tbilisi. They had two sons.

The management of the Westinghouse factory sent Prokhanov on a foreign business trip to America, where he spent about two years. Upon his return to St. Petersburg, he became actively involved in the Evangelical Christian (Pashkovtsy) movement. Within a few years, Ivan Prokhanov became the leader of the movement.

In 1916, a Petrograd court accused Prokhanov of creating a revolutionary organization, meaning the VSEKH. A prosecution began, but was suspended due to the overburdened law enforcement after the murder of Grigory Rasputin.

After the revolutions, during the Civil War, Prokhanov's wife died, and in 1926 his youngest son Vsevolod died tragically, but Ivan Stepanovich did not give up the leadership of the VSEKH. Twice he was arrested and held in a concentration camp and prison for several months each: in 1921 and 1923.

In 1923, as part of a delegation from Russia, Prokhanov attended the Baptist World Congress in Stockholm. In 1924 he traveled to Czechoslovakia, Germany, Danzig (then a free city) and Finland. In Prague he was ordained to the priesthood.

From May 1925 to November 1926, Ivan Prokhanov stayed in the United States and Canada, where he sought opportunities to provide religious literature for the believers of the USSR. According to the historian Wilhelm Kahle, Prokhanov's foreign trips were facilitated by the Soviet authorities' desire to eliminate the consequences of the civil war and the international boycott, mitigate negative attitudes toward the USSR, and expand foreign relations. In 1927 Ivan Prokhanov made a series of trips to southern Russia, the Caucasus and Siberia, including a search for a site for the construction of Evangelsk.

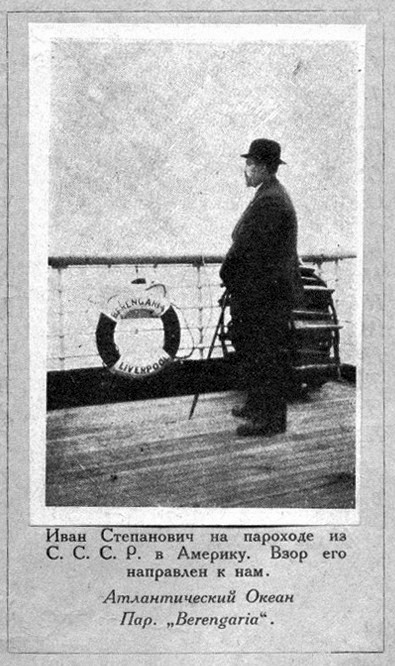
Prokhanov on his way from the USSR to the USA

=== Emigration period ===
In May 1928, Prokhanov left the USSR legally, primarily to attend the Baptist World Congress in Toronto and to seek foreign sources of funding. He intended to return to the USSR "in no more than a year", but he never did. There is a version that he did not receive permission to return, but Ivan Prokhanov himself claimed that the decision to remain in exile was made by him independently. During his stay in Germany, the Decree of the VTsIK and SNK of the RSFSR "On Religious Associations" of April 8, 1929 was published. In his autobiographical book, In the Cauldron of Russia (1933), Prokhanov recalled that he received letters from the USSR with stories about Stalin's repressions. "I took it as the God's will for me to stay abroad and try to organize constant help for those suffering during these persecutions," he wrote.

Prokhanov remained chairman of the All-Russian Union of Evangelical Christians (VSEKH) for two more years. In 1931, his associate Yakov Zhidkov was elected chairman. Zhidkov was elected chairman of the Union, and Prokhanov became "honorary chairman" (and continued in this formal position until the end of his life). According to historian Wilhelm Kahle, the title "honorary chairman" indicated that Soviet believers did not condemn him for emigrating. Prokhanov's continued ties to the Union of Evangelical Christians and concern for USSR believers encouraged him to refrain from anti-Soviet speeches in exile and speak favorably of the Soviet government. As Calais noted, by doing so Ivan Prokhanov did more good than if he had remained in the USSR as the nominal head of the dissolved Union. Thus, unlike the Federal Union of Baptists of the USSR, which was liquidated in the 1930s, the All-Union Union of Evangelical Christians-Baptists continued to exist formally (and the All-Union Council of Evangelical Christians-Baptistswas established on its basis in 1944).

In emigration, I. S. Prokhanov continued his literary and journalistic activities, and also began to organize the World Union of Evangelical Christians. The last years of his life became a time of wandering for Prokhanov. He travelled to Germany and other European countries (including Denmark, Latvia, Poland) after his stay in Germany in 1929. In the fall of 1931-spring of 1932, he stayed in the United States, from where he returned to Berlin, then visited Riga. In October 1932, Prokhanov left again for the United States, from where he returned to Berlin in the summer of 1933. At the end of that year he left again for the United States, also visiting Canada. For some time he was treated in the United States. He returned to Europe in the summer of 1935. On the way he stopped for a while at Sophia Lieven's house. After giving a course of lectures, he returned to Germany, then, despite his illness, he made a missionary trip to Bulgaria.

He died on October 6, 1935 in Berlin.

== Philosophy and Theology ==
=== Philosophy ===
Born in a Molokan family, Prokhanov identified with the persecuted Christian minority, identifying the suffering for his faith with the suffering of Christ. "All that I heard from my father and grandmothers about those who suffered for their faith made me want to devote my life to persecuted Christians and fight for freedom of conscience," he wrote. Prokhanov's autobiography is marked by confidence in his special mission. "God's purpose was that I should be a mediator, a provider of His gifts for the needs of the people," he claimed.

Prokhanov did not hide his messianic plans for the spiritual (and consequently socio-political) transformation of the world through the synergy of evangelical believers and the work of the Holy Spirit. He believed that the worldwide revolution of the Spirit, restoring Early Christianity, should begin in Russia and then embrace and transform the entire planet. Ivan Prokhanov envisioned Russia as a "spiritual graveyard or valley of dry bones" (Ezekiel 37:1-14) and looked forward to the Awakening - "it will be a true resurrection, spiritual renewal and reformation".

It is no coincidence that Prokhanov's magazine "magazine "The Christian"" published a prophecy by Hudson Taylor, a British missionary to China: "There will be a revolution in Russia which will lead to a great awakening in Western Russia; this awakening will spread over the whole earth, and then the Lord will come". Prokhanov believed that the first part of this prophecy had been fulfilled in the revolutionary events of 1905-1907. Prokhanov believed that the first part of this prophecy was fulfilled in the revolutionary events of 1905-1907. The Prokhanovtsy Evangelical Christiansof St. Petersburg, in his opinion, were to play a special role in the awakening.

Ivan Prokhanov was close to socialist beliefs, by his own admission: "I fully sympathized with all these ideals and wished to see them realized as soon as possible," he admitted. He could not accept Bolshevism's inherent denial of Christ and religion in general; on the contrary, Prokhanov was passionate about filling the political and economic transformations taking place in Russia under him with a spiritual Christian conten; according to his plan, it was Christianity that was to complete socialism, since "with all the desirability and necessity...of fundamental political and economic reforms...the true renewal of Russia is possible only on condition of the spiritual revival and self-improvement of each individual." Russian Baptist leaders disagreed with him on this point, believing that the main thing in Christian ministry is not the transformation of society, but the salvation of souls, and "everything else will be added on".

This placed Prokhanov's Christian socialism within the "modernist and romantic framework of the 19th century".

=== Theology ===
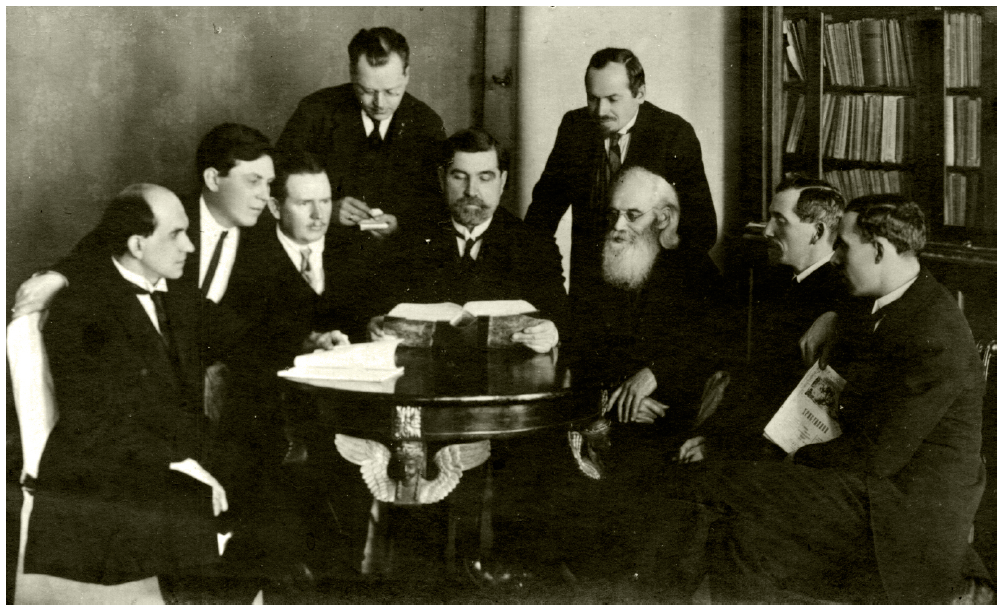
Council of ALL, circa 1927. In the center is Ivan Prokhanov, to his right is Ivan Kargel. On the far left is Alexander Karev.

After Prokhanov became the leader of the Pashkovite movement, its theology did not undergo any changes in its basic positions: adherence to the Bible (with perhaps sometimes too literal an understanding of it), crucocentrism (special attention to the question of man's atonement through Christ on the cross), emphasis on the necessity of being born again, and an active social and public position.

Prokhanov adhered to the Arminianism concept of salvation of the soul (and this concept dominated the Evangelical Christian movement as a whole). Dogmatic theology played a secondary role for Prokhanov and served as a tool to achieve the main goal — church foundation and missionary work.

=== Self-identification with baptism ===
The question, whether Prokhanov identified the Evangelical Christian Movement and himself with Baptism is a matter of much debate. Baptized in a Baptist congregation, Prokhanov, after moving to St. Petersburg, joined the Pashkov movement (which later developed into the Evangelical Christian movement with his active participation). He did not personally attend the Second Baptist World Congress in Toronto in 1911. However, he sent his abstract "Review of Russia", in which he defined Evangelical Christians as "sincere Baptists". At this congress, Prokhanov was elected in absentia as one of the six vice-presidents of the Baptist World Alliance.

Until the mid-1920s, Prokhanov attempted to unite the all-Russian unions of Evangelical Christians and Baptists. Despite opposition from Baptist leaders, this unification never took place during Prokhanov's lifetime (the remnants of the unions were not united into a single confession of Evangelical Christian Baptists until 1944). Failures led Prokhanov to distance himself from the Baptists from the mid-1920s and to attempt to formulate a new identity in the spirit of the St. Petersburg evangelical tradition.

== Leadership in the Evangelical Movement ==
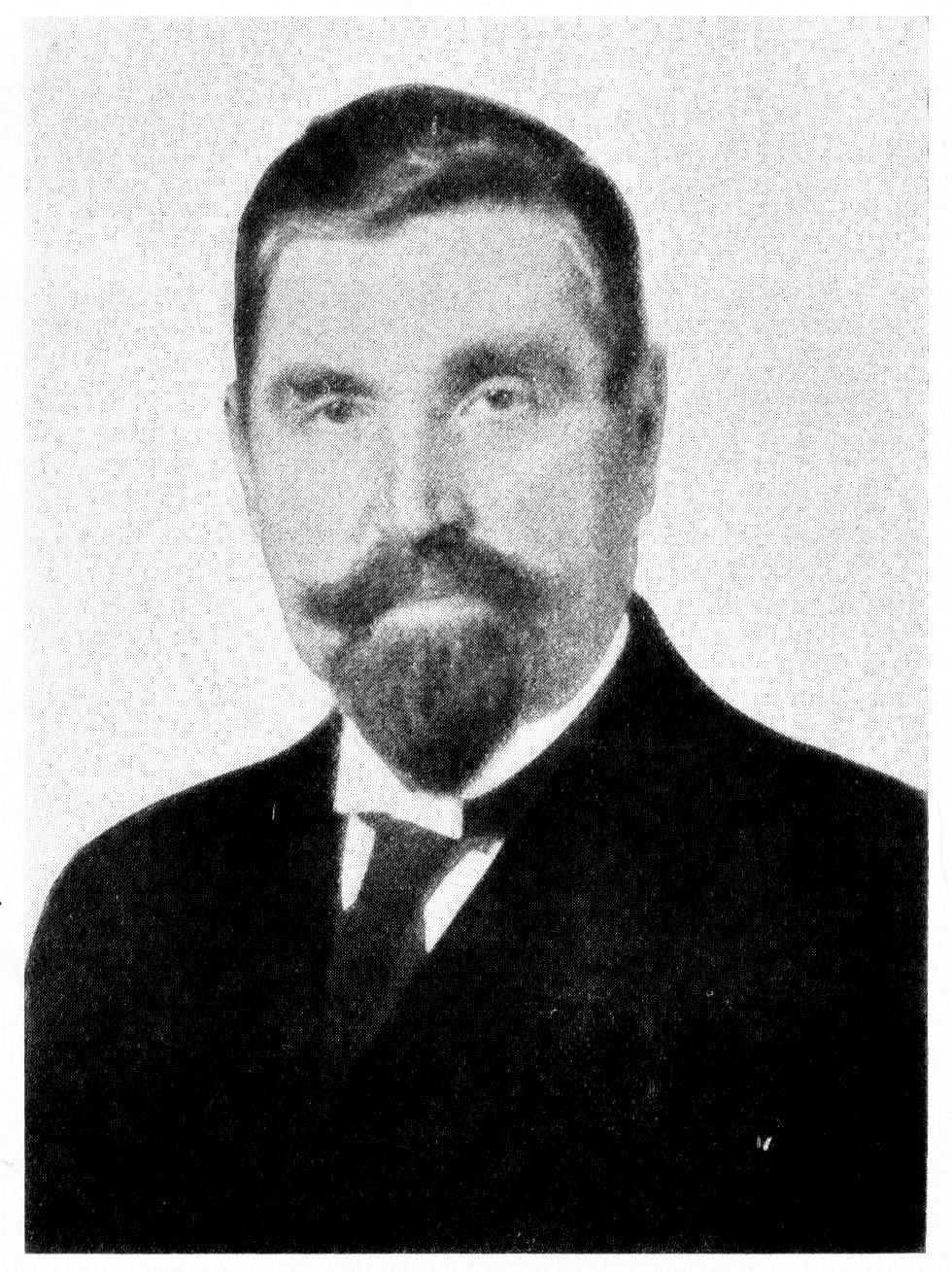
Ivan Stepanovich Prokhanov

=== Before the February Revolution ===
In 1905 Prokhanov became fully involved in evangelical activity. He organized and led a separate congregation of Evangelical Christians in St. Petersburg. The core of this congregation were the young believers who had previously separated from the congregation led by Ivan Kargel. Sophia Lieven described the difference between these congregations as follows: "Brother Kargel sought mainly to deepen the believers' knowledge of the Lord and His Word, while Brother Prokhanov encouraged his members to take an active part in the life of the community: he organized a youth union, a choir, and so on".

In 1905, together with the Mennonite Peter Friesen and the Baptist Nikolai Odintsov, Prokhanov founded the first evangelical political party in Russia — "the Union of Freedom, Truth, and Peace". Its concept was close to that of the Kadets. Its main leitmotif was an alternative to the path of violent overthrow of the government, which was unacceptable to evangelical Protestants (the events took place during the 1905-1907 revolution). The party existed until 1906, without making any particular mark on history.

==== The Russian Evangelical Union foundation ====
In 1906, Prokhanov began organizing the Russian Evangelical Union(REU), an interdenominational organization that would unite Christians not at the level of denominations or local churches, but at the level of individual believers. Membership in the union did not mean that Christians would leave their denominations (Orthodox would remain Orthodox, Baptists would remain Baptists, etc.). The World Evangelical Alliance, whose representatives Prokhanov met during his studies in Europe, was based on this principle. The REU itself was created as a Russian analog or its national branch.

The Russian Evangelical Union was seen by Prokhanov as a "spiritual engine" for the transformation of Russia and the world. However, this did not happen: although the REU was even officially registered in 1909, it remained on the periphery of public attention. The organization included about a hundred Christians of different classes (from workers to aristocrats) and different confessions. The Union was ignored by the Russian Orthodox Church, and among Russian Baptist leaders the structure created by Prokhanov provoked contradictory, including negative, reactions. For example, well-known missionary Andrei Mazaev wrote in the "Baptist" magazine. "It is already completely incomprehensible, and every mind refuses to understand this terrible union ... to be a member of a Baptist or Orthodox church and at the same time a member of an evangelical union. Can there be salt water and sweet water flowing out of the same spring? Can one slave serve two masters?"

==== Youth Movement Organization ====
Simultaneously with the creation of the Russian Evangelical Union, Prokhanov began to organize the Union of Christian Youth, which united the youth circles of the Evangelical churches. After preparatory work, the First Congress of representatives of youth circles was held in Moscow in April 1908, and the Second Congress in St. Petersburg in 1909, where the Charter of the "Evangelical Union of Christian Youth" was adopted. Prokhanov was elected as a chairman of the Union, and Yakov Zhidkov was elected as a secretary.

In the 1920s, after the end of the civil war, the movement (then called "Christomol") gained considerable recognition and aroused the concern of the authorities. "We must wage a decisive struggle against sectarianism for our youth, for our children," urged the propagandist A. I. Klibanov. In 1926, during the period of the tightening of state policy toward religion, the youth movement was banned, and in the years of Stalin's repressions it was finally crushed.

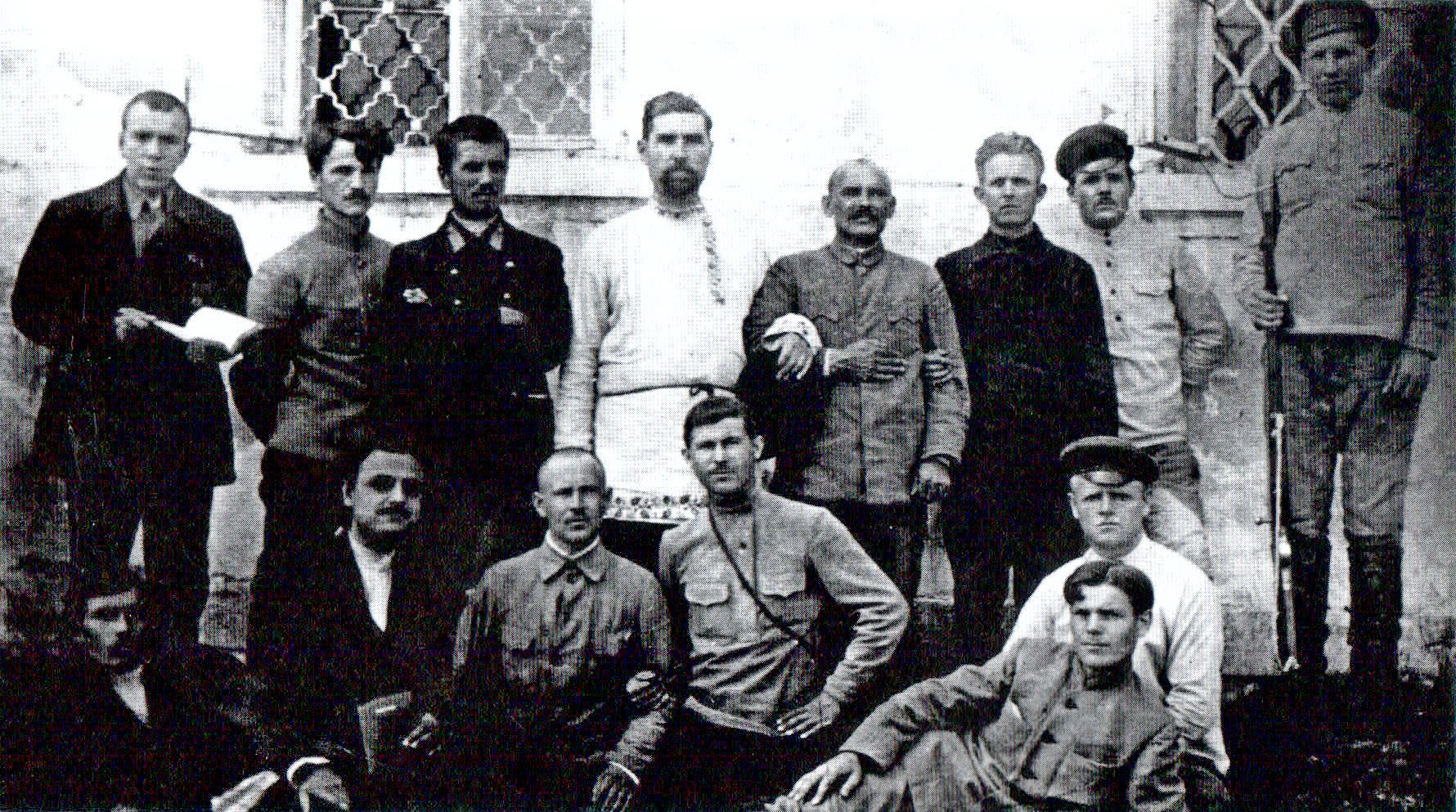
Ivan Prokhanov (second row, center) with other prisoners of faith on the day of his release from prison for holding the Sixth Congress of the Christian Youth Union in 1921. On his right is L. Shenderovsky, who was at liberty to plead for their release.

==== Creating of All-Russian Union of Evangelical Christians (VSEKH) ====
By 1911, Ivan Prokhanov had united congregations of Evangelical Christians in St. Petersburg, Sevastopol, Simferopol, Yalta, Yekaterinoslav, Konotop, Kiev, Odessa, Oleksandrivsk, Kharkov, Nikolayev, and Samara.

The Second Congress of Evangelical Christians (December 25, 1910 - January 4, 1911) established the All-Russian Union of Evangelical Christians (VSEKH), approved the Union's charter and official doctrine presented by Prokhanov (with which local congregations had been previously familiarized). The creed affirmed, among other things, the necessity of exclusively conscious baptism and rejected infant baptism as invalid. For Baptists, this eliminated the previously permissible disagreement among evangelical Christians on a matter of principle. This allowed the Baptist World Congress in 1911 to admit the VSEKH as a member of the Baptist World Alliance, and Ivan Prokhanov himself became vice-president of the organization.

At the same time, Prokhanov did not give up hope for the creation of a common front of evangelical denominations and continued attempts to unite evangelical Christians with Russian Baptists, with the further prospect of joining other close evangelical movements.

Meanwhile, in Russia, after the so-called "granting of religious freedom" in 1905-1906, a new wave of state persecution of Protestants grew. As a result, the activities of both unions (Evangelical Christians and Baptists) were half paralyzed, for example, congresses were not allowed. Despite the persecution, the number of Evangelical Christians reached 150,000 by 1917.

Religious and political organizations created either personally by Prokhanov or with his active participation
	Year of foundation	Suspension of activities	Name	Comments
1	1905	1906	The union of freedom, truth and peace	The first evangelical Christian political party in Russia. Organized jointly with the Mennonite Peter Friesen and the Baptist Nikolai Odintsov.
2	1907	1912	Russian Evangelical Union	An interdenominational Christian organization founded by Prokhanov and other Christians along the lines of the World Evangelical Alliance. The project proved unviable.
3	1909	1920s	The Union of Christian Youth	A central organization for the unification of youth groups in evangelical Christian churches.
4	1911	1944	All-Russian Union of Evangelical Christians	Confessional Union of Evangelical Christians founded by Prokhanov. In 1944, it was used as the basis for the creation of the All-Union Church of Evangelical Christians.
5	1917	1917	"Resurrection" (party)	Christian Democratic Party. Organized on Prokhanov's personal initiative.
6	1935		World Evangelical Christians Alliance	A confessional union of evangelical Christians in exile, personally founded by Prokhanov.

=== Between revolution and emigration ===
Prokhanov supported the February Revolution, and in March 1917 he founded the Christian Democratic Party "Resurrection". Prokhanov and the Evangelical Christians proposed to the Provisional Government a number of initiatives to establish freedom of conscience in the country.

Immediately after the Bolsheviks came to power, Prokhanov, unlike the Baptists, refrained from making public negative statements about the new government and later sought compromises with it.

Thanks to the fall of the monarchy, Russian Protestants were able to expand their missionary activities. "From city to city, from village to village, from village to village" was the motto used to send preachers throughout the country. After the revolution, new attempts were made to unite Baptists and Evangelicals into one denomination, and Prokhanov was actively involved in this process. However, the parties could not agree on the details, which led to a cooling of relations between the two unions in the mid-1920s.

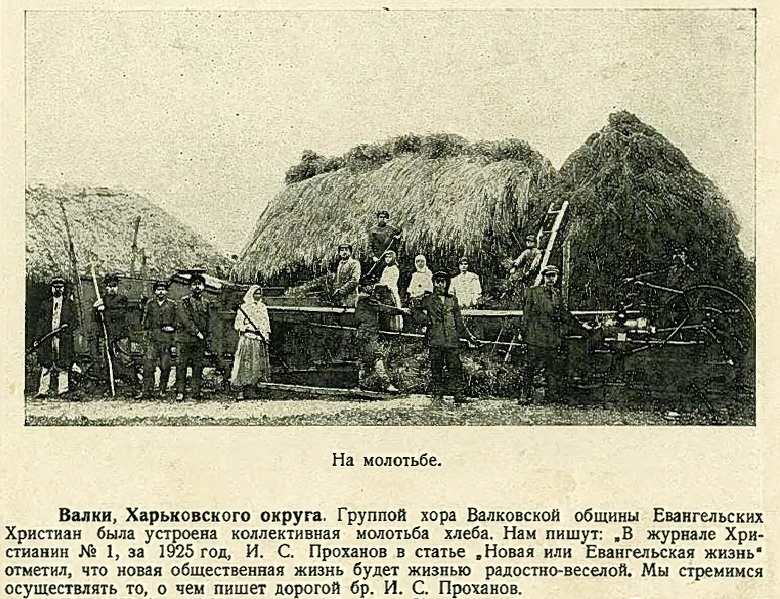
Collective work of Evangelical Christians (Prokhanovites)

==== Communities ====
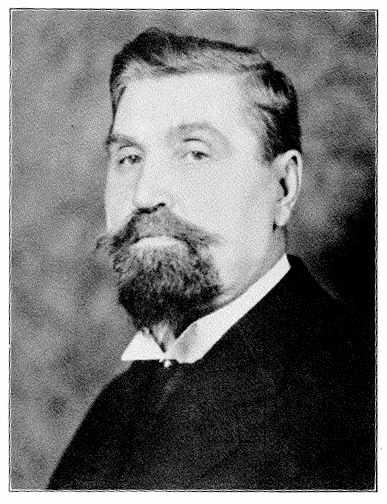
Ivan Stepanovich Prokhanov

The social and economic conditions after the revolutions of 1917 contributed to the spread of the idea of communal living. This process was accelerated by the mass migration of city dwellers to the countryside due to hunger and food shortages. The theological and theoretical basis for Christian cooperation was established by Ivan Prokhanov in the pamphlet "Evangelical Christianity and the Social Question" (1918) and the program article "New or Evangelical Life" (1925).

In 1918 in the Ryazan Governorate the communities "Bethany" and "Awakening" appeared, in the Tver Governorate: "Gethsemane", "Bethany" and "Morning Star", in addition communities began to appear in Novgorod, Bryansk, Yenisei and other provinces. At first, this process was supported by the party and economic leadership of the country, which expected a positive economic effect from the use of "significant economic and cultural elements".

In addition to agricultural communities in rural areas, Protestant economic cooperation also developed in cities, which was facilitated by the NEP. Christian artels and cooperatives were engaged in construction, production of bread and confectionery, sewing clothes and shoes, organization of public catering, etc.

The attitude of the Soviet authorities toward Christian communes and artels changed in the mid-1920s, and by the early 1930s the movement was completely curtailed.

==== "The Evangelical Cry" ====
Prokhanov saw the Evangelical movement as a catalyst for a reformation of the Russian Orthodox Church even before World War I began. After the victory of the Bolsheviks in 1917, the Evangelical movement rapidly lost its influence and fragmented. A spiritual vacuum formed in the country, which Prokhanov decided to exploit for his own purposes. In summer 1922, shortly after the arrest of Patriarch Tikhon, Prokhanov published a tract with a circulation of 100,000, entitled "The Evangelical Cry", with a call for reform addressed to the hierarchy of the Russian Orthodox Church and the Renovationist "Living Church".

In particular, he proposed to eliminate the doctrine of the mediation between God and man by someone other than Jesus Christ (saints, the Virgin Mary), to abolish the use of icons, relics, etc., to abolish the church hierarchy and the division of Christians into priesthood and laity, etc. Prokhanov compared traditional Orthodox practices to "shrouds" whose release would give the Russian Orthodox Church and other Orthodox groups a new appearance. At the same time, in his opinion, the renewal reforms had an incomplete, half-hearted character. Prokhanov reiterated his call not only to repair the spiritual house from the outside, but to build a new spiritual building, promising to support the Evangelical Church.

The article provoked mixed reactions (among both Orthodox and Protestants, for example, the rejection of Russian Baptist leaders), but led to concrete actions by some Orthodox clergy, including joint services of representatives of different confessions, one of which is described in Vladimir Marcinkovsky's memoirs. In particular, Prokhanov's initiative was supported by one of the leaders of Renovationism, Bishop Antonin (Granovsky). Prokhanov's speech in March 1923 at the congress of another Renovationist group "Union of the Communities of the Ancient Apostolic Church" (led by Archpriest Alexander Vvedensky) caused controversy, but in general favorable attitude to the evangelical leader remained.

Prokhanov's support from the Renewalists was limited. However, he did not cease his efforts to reform Christianity. In September 1922 he issued a new proclamation, "A Voice from the East," addressed to "all Christian churches and denominations in Russia and throughout the world". In it he recalled the horrors of World War I and the role of the clergy in it. In it, he recalled the horrors of World War I and the role played by the clergy of the historic churches: "The Orthodox clergy blessed the Russian army, the Anglican clergy blessed the English army, the Lutheran clergy blessed the German army, the Catholic clergy blessed the French army". After repeating the main theses of the "evangelical cliché" (the necessity of rejecting church traditions and the mediating role of the clergy between God and man), he called for a "worldwide reformation" under the slogan: "Back to Christ, back to the Gospel, back to primitive Christianity", which should lead to the emergence of a "Universal First Christian Church".

According to the theologian and historian Vladimir Popov, Prokhanov's actions, although too simple and largely utopian in nature, contributed to large-scale communication between Protestant Evangelicals and Orthodox, eliminating many stereotypes and prejudices and strengthening Protestantism in Russia.

==== Pacifism rejection ====
In 1922-1924, the Soviet authorities launched a campaign against pacifism among believers (previously, pacifism was allowed, the legislation even provided for the possibility of refusing to serve with arms on the grounds of religious beliefs, although in practice not all pacifists managed to obtain such permission). Ivan Prokhanov's creed stated: "We recognize military conscription as a tax, but have fellowship with those who think differently in this matter"; and Ivan Kargel's creed stated: "We serve military conscription at the call of the lawful authority, but pray diligently for the peace of the whole world." However, as a result of the bloody World War I, the two revolutions that followed, and the Civil War, pacifist beliefs among believers increased significantly.

Combating pacifism among Protestants was one of the tasks of the Anti-Religious Commission under the Central Committee of the RCP(b)— All-Union Communist Party of the Bolsheviks. On April 5, 1923, Prokhanov was again imprisoned for four months for distributing the proclamation "Voice from the East", which contained a pacifist statement.

While Prokhanov was imprisoned, the Chekists succeeded in forcing him to recognize military conscription as obligatory for Soviet Evangelical Christians and to sign an anti-pacifist proclamation published in "Izvestia" newspaper. After his release, during the 9th Congress of Evangelical Christians (held from 1st to 10 September 1923), despite the dissatisfaction of some believers, Prokhanov secured recognition of military service by a majority vote of the congress participants. Prokhanov's actions led to a ferment among the believers, a number of congregations left the VSEKH and joined the Baptists.

==== Evangelsk ====
In 1926, Prokhanov managed to get permission to establish the Christian community city of Evangelsk (another name — the City of the Sun). In August–September 1927 Ivan Prokhanov and a group of like-minded people made an expedition to Siberia. In the Altai, at the confluence of the Biya and Katun in Ob river, they chose a place for the construction of Evangelsk. Prokhanov made a symbolic planting of cedar and American maple saplings there, and also held a divine service.

The start of construction was postponed until the following year because of the approaching cold weather. However, state policy toward Protestants hardened during this period. At a meeting of the Politburo of the Central Committee of the All-Union Communist Party of the Bolsheviks on May 17, 1928, I. V. Stalin spoke about the "blatant fact" of the permission of the Resettlement Department of the People's Commissariat of the RSFSR to organize a "religious city" in Siberia. After a short trial, the realization of the project was frozen, and Prokhanov soon left the country.

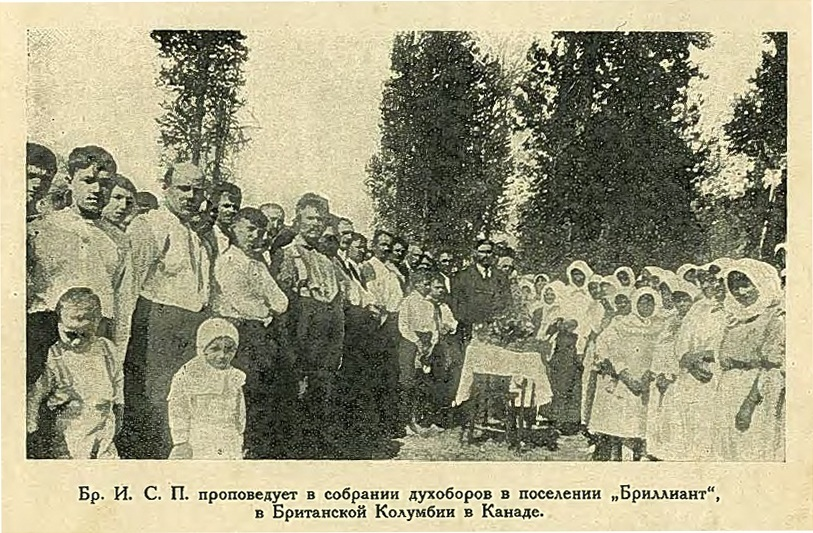
Prokhanov preaches among the Doukhobors in Canada

=== In emigration ===
Even before his emigration, during his travels abroad, Prokhanov organized from Evangelical Christian emigrants overseas departments of the VSEKH in Latvia, Estonia, Poland, Germany and the United States. Once in emigration, Ivan Prokhanov began to create on its basis the World Union of Evangelical Christians, to which he devoted the last years of his life.

The "General Testament" published after Prokhanov's death instructed that after the establishment of the World Union of Evangelical Christians, Jacob Kreker and Walter Jacque should be appointed Chairman and Deputy Chairman of the "Light in the East" Mission, due to the fact that during the years of emigration Prokhanov had not found staff capable of carrying out this ministry. Nevertheless, the Union was established in 1937, after Prokhanov's death.

=== Poetic and musical activity ===
Prokhanov is the author of devotional psalms of a doctrinal nature. He has written and published 1,233 poems of spiritual content, and another 210 are still unpublished.

Ivan Prokhanov considered hymns to be an important part of church worship and one of the main components of the formation of confessional identity. In creating psalms, he paid great attention to both the content of the text and the melody. On the one hand, Prokhanov sought to use the best examples of foreign church music, and on the other hand, to create an original style that combined the joy of the gospel message with the Russian national musical tradition. He enlisted the gospel composers Albert Keshe, Nikolai Kazakov, Grigory Dranenko, and Karolis Inkis for the musical design. In order to ensure a high level of psalmody at the VSEKH, a special commission was created, which included people with higher musical-theoretical education. Ivan Prokhanov's creative work contributed to the emergence of a new direction in Russian music.

His work culminated in 1927 with the publication of a three-volume "ten-collection" (i.e., the final collection included hymns from 10 previous hymnals published since 1902).

=== Publishing and related activities ===
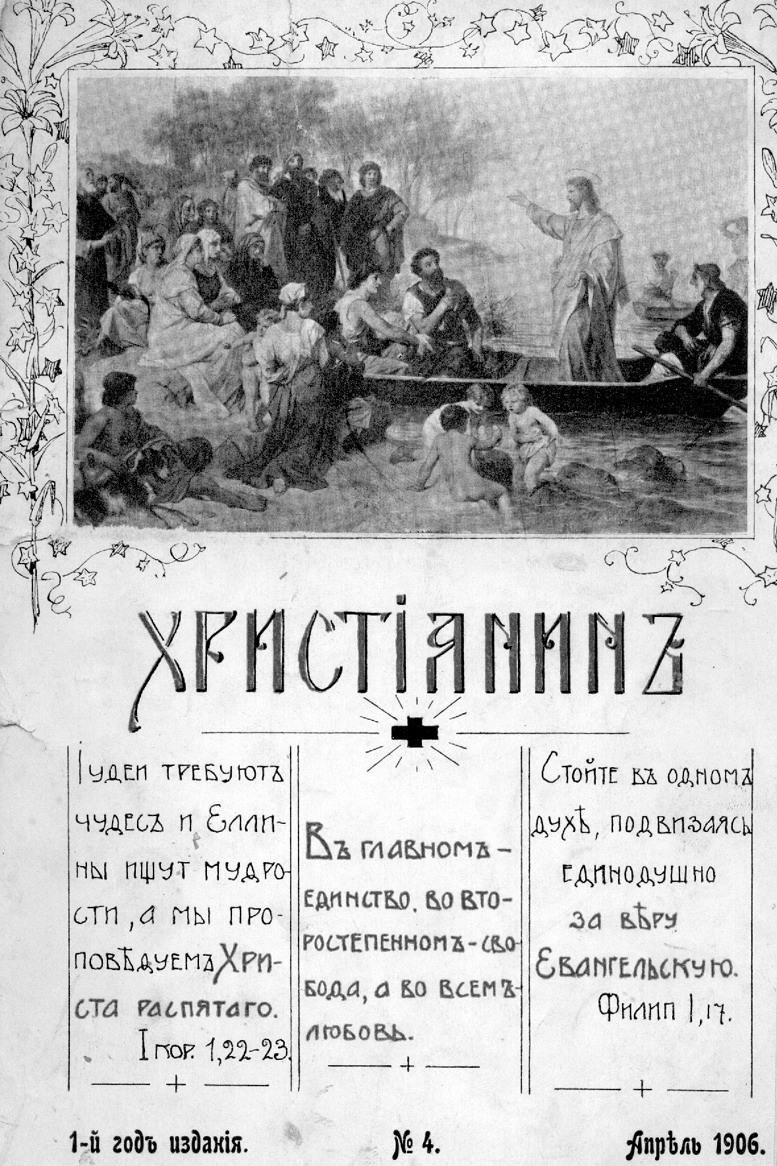
Magazine "The Christian"

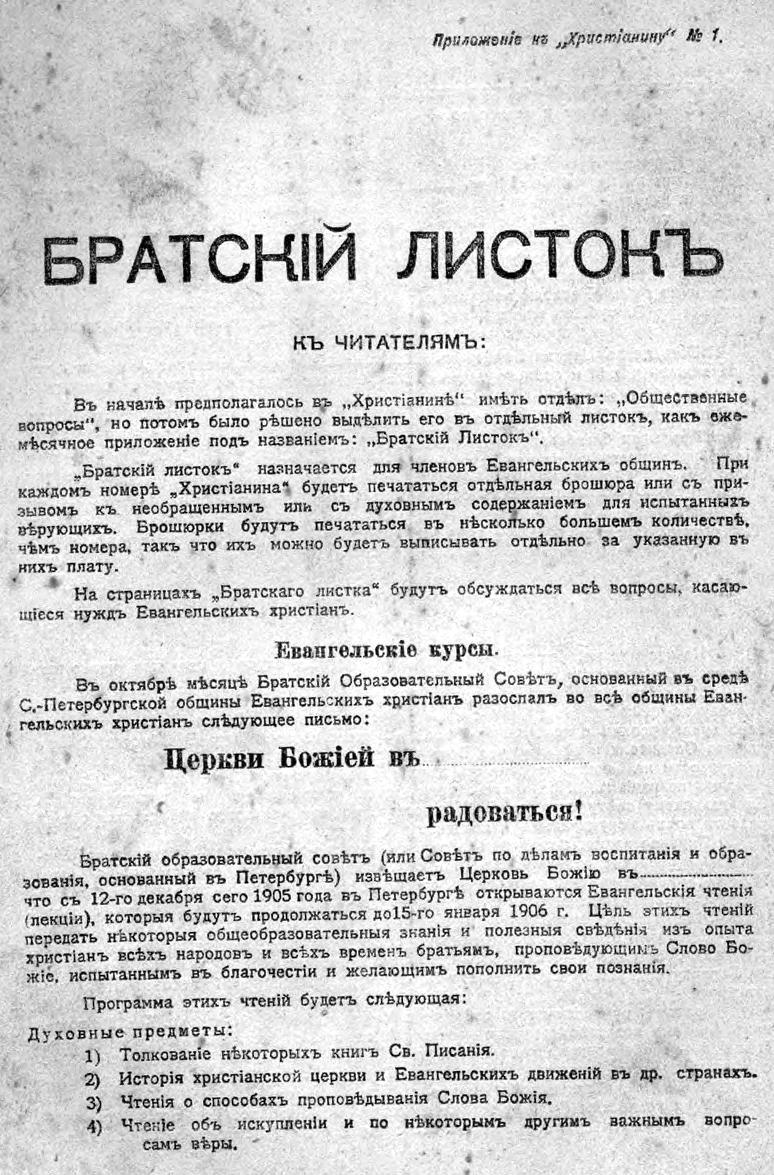
The magazine "Fraternal leaflet"

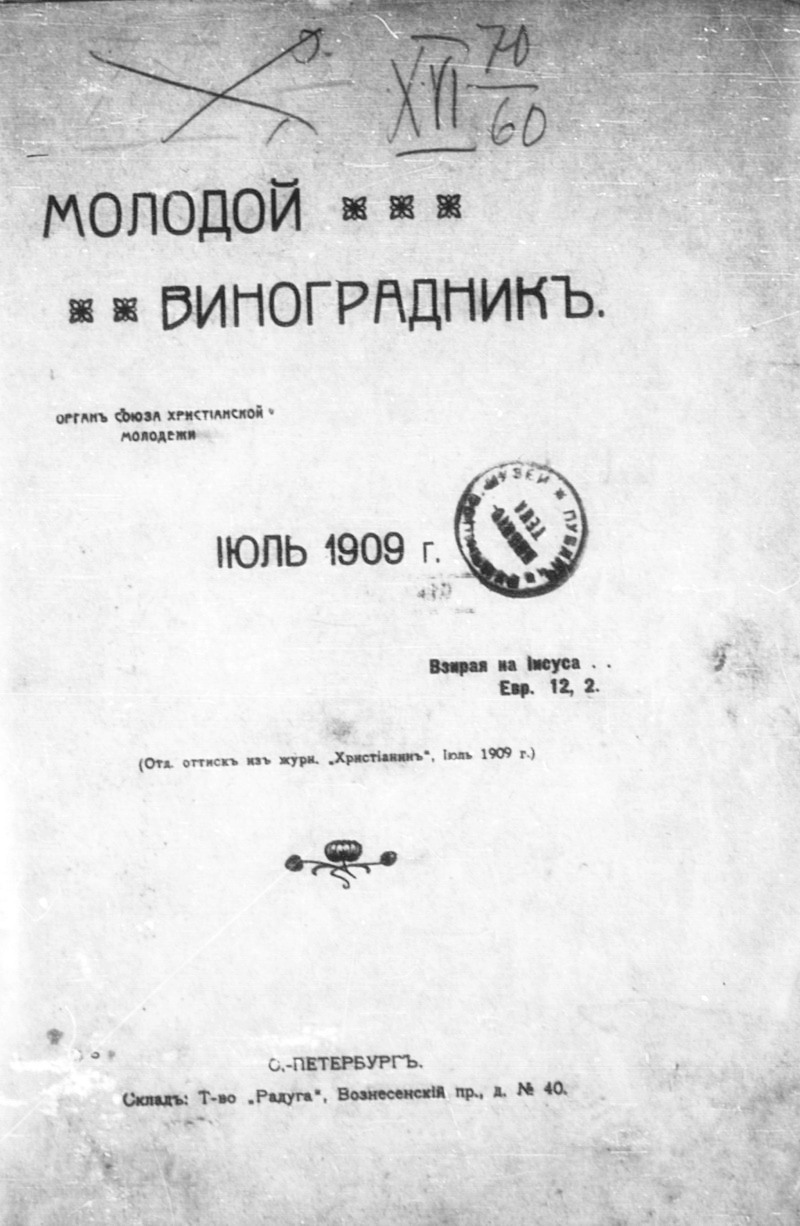
"Young Vineyard" magazine

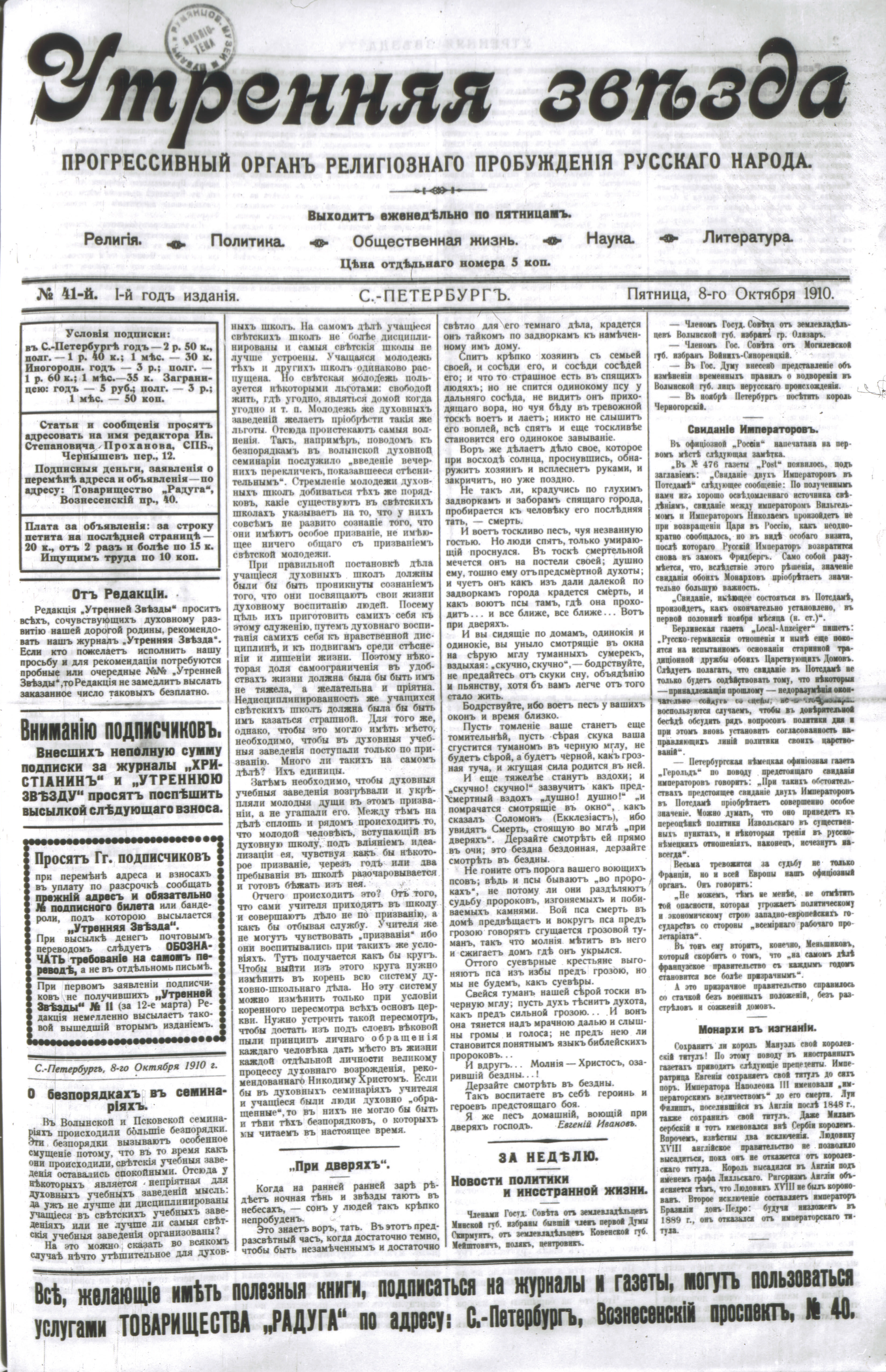
"Morning Star" newspaper

An important area of Prokhanov's activity was the publication of spiritual literature. In different years he edited and published the Christian magazines "Beseda" (together with his brother Alexander), "Sower", "Christian", "Brother's List", "Young Vineyard", "Children's Friend", as well as the newspaper "Morning Star". He wrote much of the material for these. While in exile, he published the magazine "Evangeliskaya Vera".

Prokhanov became editor-in-chief of the Raduga Publishing House, which supplied spiritual literature to evangelical communities in Russia. The publishing house itself was located in Ukraine; thanks to Prokhanov, a branch was opened in St. Petersburg, which contributed to the success of the mission.

In exile, he wrote and published an autobiographical work, "In the Cauldron of Russia," outlining his view of the history and prospects of Evangelicalism in Russia and the USSR.

In 1926 he succeeded in obtaining permission, raising funds, and publishing 175,000 copies of Bibles, New Testaments, songbooks, and other spiritual literature in the USSR.

==== Books and pamphlets by Ivan Prokhanov ====
Number	Creation year	Publishing year	Title	Goal
1	1909	1920s	A Statement of Evangelical Faith, or the Creed of Evangelical Christians (Prokhanov's Creed)	Dogmatic doctrine of evangelical Christians
2	1911	1911	Law and Faith: A Guide to the Organization of Religious Meetings, Legalization, and Administration of All Civil Affairs of Communities Separated from Orthodoxy	Legal assistance to believers and churches
3	1918	1918	Evangelical Christianity and the Social Question	Theoretical basis for Christian economic cooperation and the creation of communities
4		1969	A brief doctrine of preaching. Experience of Evangelical Homiletics	Preachers' preparation
5	1933	1933 (in English)	In the cauldron of Russia	Autobiography. An overview of the evangelical history of Russia

=== Education activities ===
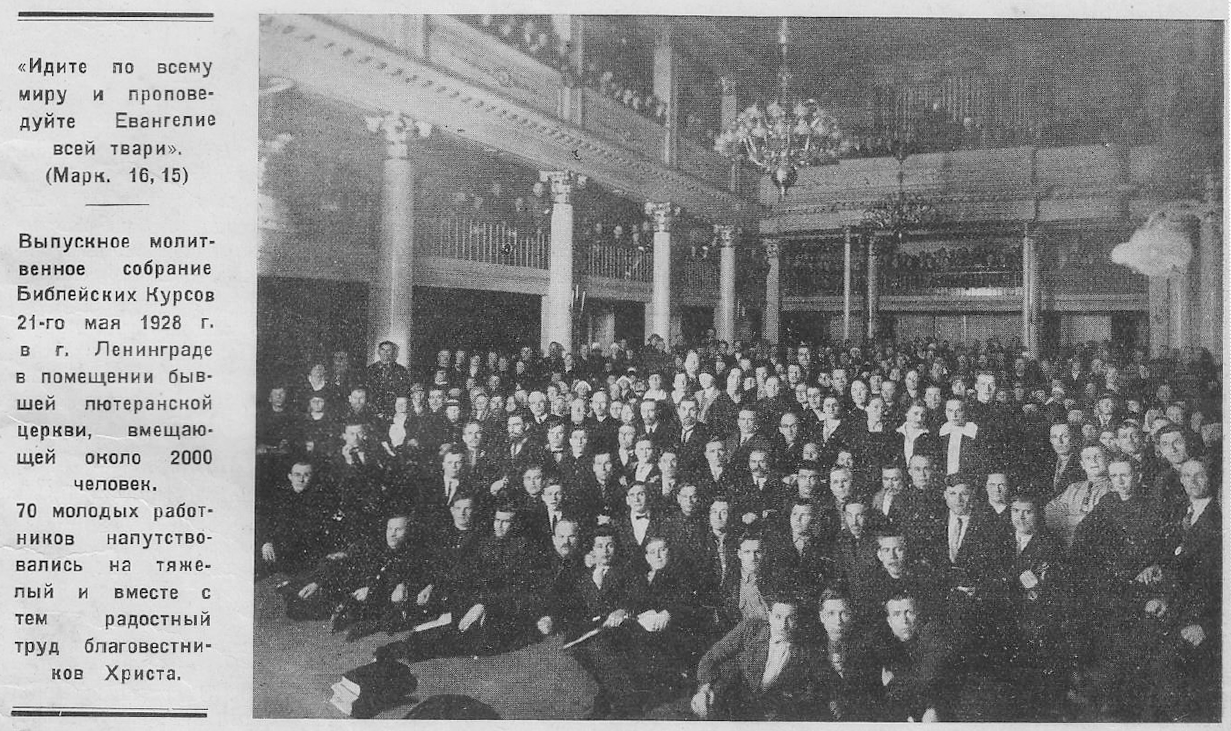
Graduation meeting of the Leningrad Bible courses, 1928. Ivan Prokhanov is in the middle.

Ivan Prokhanov paid great attention to the issue of training preachers and missionaries. At the first opportunity (as soon as the internal political situation in the country allowed it), Prokhanov and his associates set about establishing a preaching school. Beginning in 1905, six-week courses for preachers were held regularly in the St. Petersburg congregation, which was open not only to Evangelical Christians but also to Baptists. The theologian Ivan Kargel was the permanent teacher of the course, and Pavel Nicolai, Alexander Maximovsky, Vladimir Offenberg, Ivan Prokhanov himself, and others were also engaged to teach.

In 1913, Prokhanov and his associates succeeded in opening two-year courses for preachers in St. Petersburg. In fact, these courses became the first Protestant theological school in Russia to be taught in Russian. However, in 1914, with the outbreak of World War I and a further tightening of state policy toward Protestants, these courses were closed. They were reopened in 1922. Until 1925 the courses were short and irregular, and from 1925 they became annual and regular. They continued until 1929, when they were liquidated in the course of Stalin's repression of Evangelical Christians and Baptists, having trained about 400 preachers in 4 years.

== Family ==
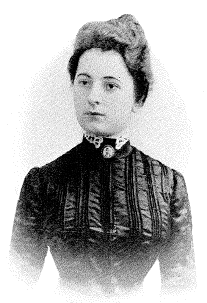
Wife - Anna Ivanovna

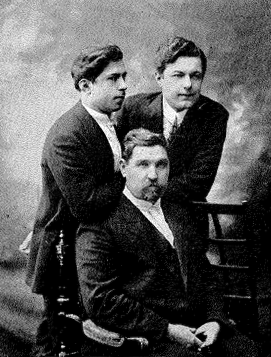
Prokhanov with sons Yaroslav and Vsevolod

=== Brothers ===
Two brothers, Alexander and Vasily, grew up with Prokhanov. Ivan was the eldest. Unlike their father and Ivan, the younger brothers remained Molokan.

After the University of Dorpat, Alexander studied medicine in Paris, where he also attended the Protestant Theological Faculty. Returning to the Caucasus, he worked as a doctor, founded the "Society of Educated Molokans" (which tried to reconcile religious faith with Darwinism), published the Molokan magazine "Spiritual Christian" (the main topics of which were apologetic polemics with Baptism and harsh theological criticism of the Bible), and wrote several theological works. In addition, Alexander Stepanovich founded the Prokhanov Credit Partnership in Vladikavkaz, which lent money to small businesses of Molokans, Evangelical Christians, and Baptists. The profits were used for charitable purposes. Died in 1912 of typhus, which he contracted in a hospital while performing his medical duties. The contemporary writer and publicist A. A. Prokhanov is his grandson.

Vasily, who also received a good education, was involved in trade and supported the "Prokhanov Credit Partnership". After the Revolution of 1917, having lost his fortune, he emigrated to Europe, where he completed a four-year theological course at the Free Evangelical Fellowship in Germany. Before World War II, he moved to the United States, where he attempted to bring Russian emigrants (Molokans and Evangelical Christians) closer together: "I am now trying to devote the rest of my life to continuing the work of my brothers and my common ideal of life with them".

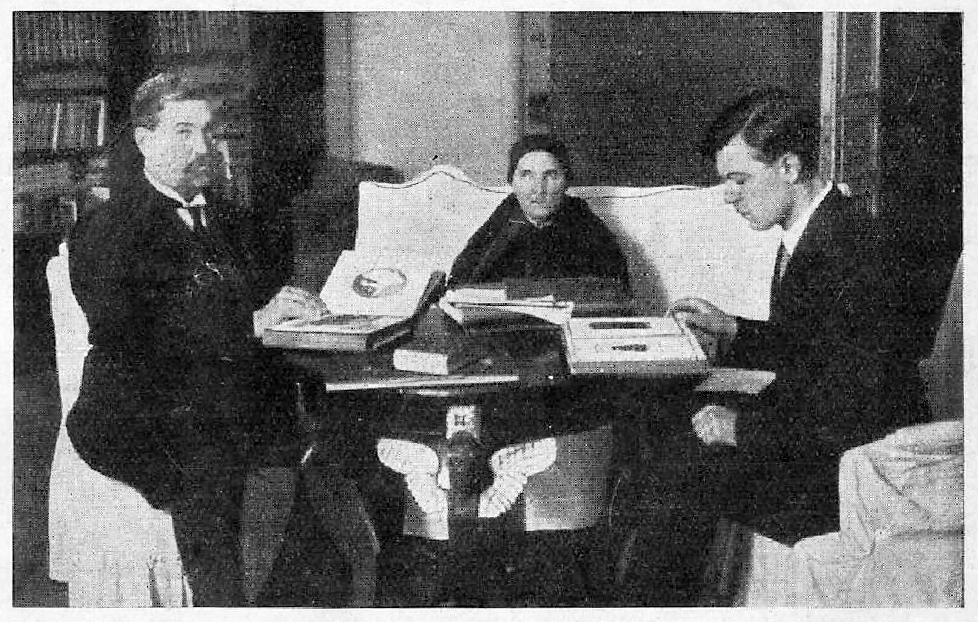
Prokhanov with his mother and son Yaroslav

=== Wife and sons ===
Prokhanov met his future wife Anna Ivanovna in Tbilisi in early 1901. They married the same year. According to his memoirs, she was a good Christian, "had an angelic character, was very beautiful, rich and well-educated. She spoke English, French and German. In addition, she was a very talented musician".

They had two sons: Yaroslav and Vsevolod. The choice of names was explained by the father's interest in Russian history. Ivan Prokhanov strove to give them a good education: the sons attended the gymnasium of the German Reformed Church in St. Petersburg, which their father considered one of the best in the city. There they learned German, while English and French were taught privately. In addition, to teach them English, Prokhanov invited a Christian governess from London to live with him.

According to Prokhanov's memoirs, his wife and sons left for Tbilisi, where his wife's parents lived and where conditions were better, in May 1919, when Petrograd was in a state of Red Terror and War Communism. Prokhanov himself remained in St. Petersburg to continue his work at VSEKH. Due to the illness of his eldest son Yaroslav and the blocking of the road by the military, the family's journey was delayed, and on July 30, 1919, Prokhanov's wife died of Asiatic cholera in Vladikavkaz, having never reached Tbilisi. The sons lived for a while with the family of their father's brother Vasily, then with his wife's parents. According to Prokhanov's autobiography, his sons returned to Petrograd in 1921 and became involved in Christian work. In 1926 his youngest son Vsevolod died tragically as a result of careless handling of weapons.

Their oldest son, Yaroslav, became a botanist. In 1938, after his father's emigration and death, he was arrested on charges under articles 58-10 and 58-11. In 1939 the case against Yaroslav was dropped for lack of corpus delicti.

== Death ==
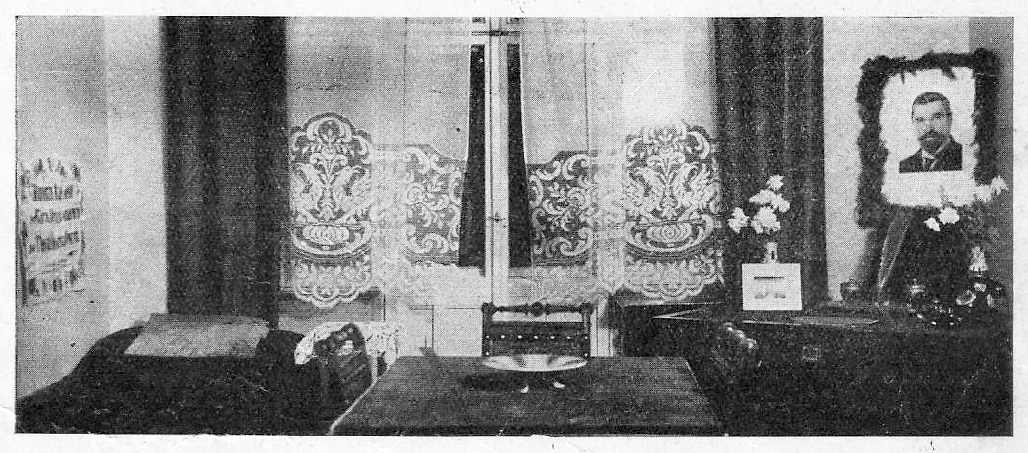
The room where Ivan Prokhanov lived during his last days. Photo taken after his death.

According to the recollections of his associates, Prokhanov was in satisfactory health. He was characterized by vigor, strong will and exceptional ability to work. Sometimes from overwork he had temporary problems with the heart. In 1929 it was discovered that Prokhanov suffered from a mild form of diabetes mellitus. In 1934 he spent a week in a clinic in New York being treated for it. His colleagues noticed that he had recently become weak and aged when he returned to Europe from America in June 1935.

In September 1935, at the request of the Bulgarian preacher Mitko Mateev, he made a two-week trip to Bulgaria. Here Prokhanov preached in various cities, participated in meetings of the Evangelical congregations of Sofia and Plovdiv, and attended the First Bulgarian Congress of Evangelical Christians, where their national union was founded. Shortly before this trip, Prokhanov's leg began to hurt. The doctor said that the abscess on his leg was related to diabetes. The swelling went down before the trip. In Bulgaria, however, the leg became inflamed again and a second abscess appeared. Upon his return to Germany, Prokhanov, at the doctor's insistence, went to a clinic, first to a private one, then, as his condition worsened, to the Evangelical Hospital named after Martin Luther (German). The doctors discussed the question of amputation of the leg, but because of diabetes, complicated by inflammation of the lungs, they did not dare to carry it out.

Members of the Berlin Evangelical Christian Community and other colleagues regularly visited him in the hospital. On October 4, he said goodbye to the visiting members of his congregation and asked them to sing the hymn "For the Evangelical Faith". After that he remained in a state of virtual oblivion and died quietly on the morning of October 6.

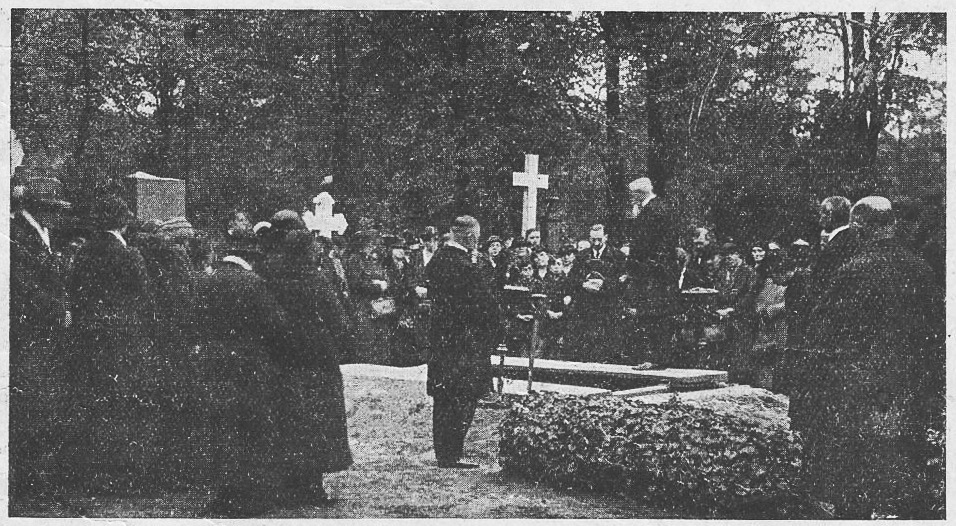
The funeral of Ivan Prokhanov. Pastor Walter Jacques delivers the eulogy.

=== Funeral ===
The funeral was postponed for 5 days in the hope that believers from Moscow would arrive. But a few days later the leaders of the All-Union Council of Evangelical Christians sent telegrams of condolence and a message that they would not be able to come. Personal friends, members of the Berlin congregation of Evangelical Christians, representatives of the missionary union "Light in the East" and representatives of the World Evangelical Alliance took part in the memorial services. There were no representatives of Russian Baptists (including those in exile); some observers considered this a manifestation of a sense of rivalry with Prokhanov.

The burial took place on October 11, in the old Protestant cemetery of the Holy Trinity in Kreuzberg (one of the central districts of Berlin). In 1945, during the battle in Berlin, this cemetery suffered from street fighting, and a bullet hit the gravestone of Ivan Prokhanov. In the post-war period, the question of Prokhanov's reburial in his homeland was repeatedly discussed among believers, but these plans were not realized. In the 2010s, according to unconfirmed data from social networks, a highway was built along the section of the cemetery where the grave was located.

Prokhanov left his personal archives and property to be returned to the Soviet Union, but they were lost during the Second World War.

== Critics ==
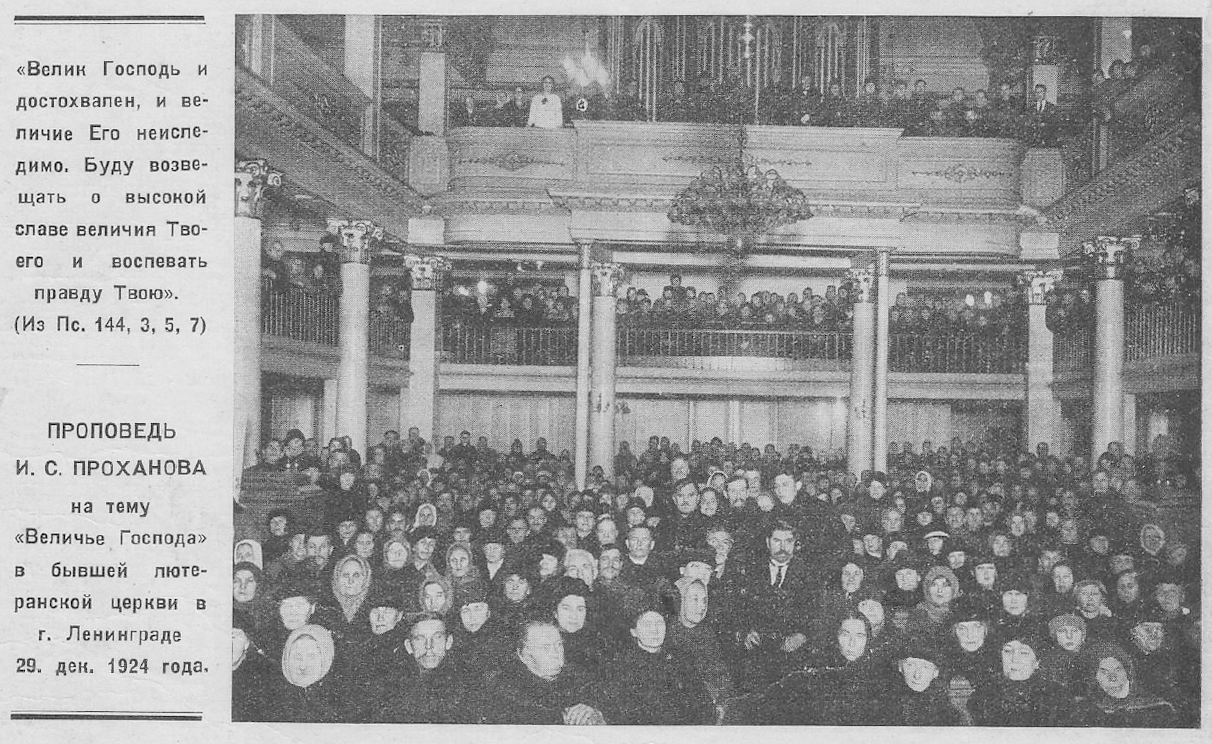
Sermon by Ivan Prokhanov (center), 1924

According to the historian Wilhelm Kahle, the great importance of Ivan Prokhanov's personality in the history of Russian Protestantism is undeniable, but his role is still not fully understood and appreciated. He is placed on a par with such "fathers" of Russian-Ukrainian evangelical Protestantism as Vasily Pashkov, Modest Korf, Granville Radstock, Nikita Voronin, and Ivan Ryaboshapka.

But the controversy continues. Prokhanov has damaged the unity of the evangelical movement, according to some advocates of a strict Baptist understanding of Protestantism. Some point to his desire to get along with all the ever-changing authorities in Russia and thus accuse him of opportunism, without taking into account his achievements in building up the church. Another common reproach is Prokhanov's ability to present himself in a favorable light in public. He lost many friends (especially among Christians in the West) because his requests for material help for the Evangelical movement in Russia, for the Union of Evangelical Christians, sounded "too shrill and too defenseless". At the same time, for a large number of believers Ivan Prokhanov is a spiritual authority, and they remember him with gratitude.

According to Tatiana Nikolskaya, (Note: Nikolskaya Tatiana Kirillovna — Candidate of Historical Sciences, Senior Lecturer at St. Petersburg State University, author of several scientific works on the Protestantism history.) without Prokhanov's creative legacy "it is impossible to imagine the further development of Protestantism in Russia. Nikolskaya noted that "Prokhanov was not without faults, but we have no other historical leader of such magnitude".

== Memory ==
A significant number of books and articles have been devoted to Prokhanov's work, written both by Evangelical Christians and by researchers who are not Evangelical Christians. In connection with his anniversaries, commemorative events are organized in some Evangelical churches and church associations. In 2009 the Logos Christian Center published Prokhanov's writings in two volumes.

The historian Wilhelm Kahle, who heard it from a traveler visiting the USSR, told one of the myths about Prokhanov. Allegedly, in 1924, shortly before his death, the seriously ill leader of the Bolshevik Revolution Vladimir Lenin asked to call Prokhanov to him to pray together. Kahle heard this story several years before the publication of his book about Prokhanov (1978), but assumed it to be an old myth.

Russia celebrated the 150th anniversary of Prokhanov's birth in February–May 2019. In advance, leaders of evangelical denominations in Russia and a representative of the Seventh-day Adventist Church signed a special declaration emphasizing Prokhanov's contribution to Russian history and calling for participation in the anniversary. The European Institute of the Russian Academy of Sciences held an international scientific conference dedicated to Prokhanov, entitled "Historical, Cultural, and Social Role of Protestantism in Russia and Europe" and the Civic Chamber of the Russian Federation held a conference entitled "150th Anniversary of I. S. Prokhanov — a Recognized Russian Religious and Public Figure of the Early 20th Century". A solemn divine service was held in the Moscow Central Baptist Church.

== Bibliography ==
- В[асилий]. П[роханов]. А. С. Проханов // Журнал «Солнце». — 1938. — V. № 1—3. — P. 24.
- В[асилий]. П[роханов]. Краткая Автобиография и цели моей жизни // Журнал «Солнце». — 1938. — V. № 1—3. — P. 26—28.
- Впервые вышло полное издание произведений Ивана Проханова// Российский союз евангельских христиан-баптистов: сайт. — 2009. — 1 December.: 9 February 2018.
- Гончаренко Е. С. Музыкальные реформы М. Лютера и их следы в реформаторской деятельности И. С. Проханова // Богословские размышления. Спецвыпуск «Реформация: восточноевропейские измерения». — Евро-азиатская аккредитационная ассоциация, 2016. — V. 17. — P. 260—266. — ISSN 2415-783X.
- Дело веры и труд любви // Российский союз евангельских христиан-баптистов: сайт. — 2009. — 14 December. Archive: 9 February 2018.
- Для меня жизнь Христос! // РС ЕХБ официальный сайт. — 2019. Archive: 22 April 2019.
- Евангельские церкви в поисках «чувства времени». В Институте Европы РАН состоялась конференция, посвященная 150-летию И. С. Проханова // РС ЕХБ официальный сайт. — 2019. Archive: 22 April 2019.
- Иванов М. В. Становление и первоначальное развитие богословских воззрений российских евангельских христиан-баптистов // Вестник МБС ЕХБ. — Москва, 2014. — V. 2. — P. 59—64. Archive: 9 February 2018.
- История ЕХБ в СССР. — М.: издательство ВСЕХБ, 1989. — P. 624.
- Кале В. Евангельские христиане в России и Советском Союзе. Иван Степанович Проханов (1869—1935) и путь евангельских христиан и баптистов. Перевод с нем. Скворцова П. И = Evangelische Christen in Russland und der Sovetunion [Sowjetunion]. Ivan Stepanovich Prochanov (1869—1935) und der Weg der Evangeliumschristen und Baptisten. Von Wilhelm Kahle. — Онкен — Вуперталь и Кассель, 1978. — 627 p.
- Кифер А. П. Последнее путешествие брата И. С. Проханова // Евангельская вера: журнал. — 1935. — № 1—12. — P. 31—48.
- Клибанов А. И. История религиозного сектантства в России (60-е годы XIX в. — 1917 г.). — Москва: Наука, 1965. — 348 p.
- Клибанов А. И. Классовое лицо современного сектантства. — Л.: Прибой, 1928. — 104 p. (unavailable link)
- Конференция «150-летие И.С. Проханова - признанного российского религиозно-общественного деятеля начала 20-го века». Общественная палата РФ // РС ЕХБ официальный сайт. — 2019. : 22 April 2019.
- Крапивин М. Ю., Лейкин А. Я., Далгатов А. Г. Судьбы христианского сектантства в Советской России (1917 — конец 1930-х годов) / Рецензенты д. и. н. В. С. Измозик, д. и. н. В. В. Молзинский. — СПб.: С-Петербургского университета, 2003. — 308 p. — ISBN 5-288-02851-6.
- Ливен С. П. Духовное пробуждение в России. — Корнталь: Свет на Востоке, 1967. — 125 p.
- Мазаев А. М. О Петербургской «свободе» // Баптист: журнал. — Нахичевань, 1909. — № 11. — P. 14—15.
- Марцинковский В. Ф. Записки верующего. Из истории Религиозного движения в России (1917—1923). — Прага, 1929.
- Митрохин Л. Н. Баптизм: история и современность (философско-социологические очерки). — СПб.: РХГИ, 1997. — 480 p. — 2500 экз. — ISBN 5-88812-037-5.
- Никольская Т. К. Русский протестантизм и государственная власть в 1905— 1991 годах. — СПб.: Издательство Европейского университета в Санкт-Петербурге, 2009. — 356 p. — (Территории истории; Ed. 2). — ISBN 978-5-94380-081-8.
- Никольская Т. К. Юбилей прошел. – Забудем? Кто же он – Иван Степанович Проханов? // Мирт: интернет-газета. — Санкт-Петербург, 2020. — 10 February. Archive: 11 February 2020.
- О кончине Всеволода Ивановича Проханова (младшего сына И. С. Проханова) // Христианин: журнал. — Ленинград, 1927. — № 3. — P. 59—60.
- Подписание декларации посвященной 150-летию со Дня рождения И.С. Проханова // РС ЕХБ официальный сайт. — 2019. Archive: 22 April 2019.
- Попов В. А. «Евангельский клич» И. С. Проханова как проект и попытка реализации идей Реформации в движении православных обновленцев начала 20-х г.г. XX века // Богословские размышления. Спецвыпуск «Реформация: восточноевропейские измерения». — Евро-азиатская аккредитационная ассоциация, 2016. — V. 17. — P. 79—90. — ISSN 2415-783X.
- Попов В. А. И. С. Проханов: Страницы жизни. — Санкт-Петербург: Библия для всех, 1996. — 201 p.
- Попов В. А. Сибирская утопия баптистов // Независимая газета: газета. — М., 2010.
- Попов В. А. Поездки Проханова за рубеж // Журнал «Братский вестник». — ВСЕХБ, 1990a. — V. № 1. — P. 55—60.
- Попов В. А. Христианские коммуны Проханова // Наука и религия: журнал. — 1990b. — № 7. — P. 48—51. — ISSN 0130-7045.
- Потапова Н. В. Евангельское христианство и баптизм в России в 1917—1922 гг. (на материалах Дальнего Востока). — Диссертация на соискание ученой степени кандидата исторических наук. — Южно-Сахалинск: СахГУ, 2015. (unavailable link)
- Потапова Н. В. Евангельское христианство и баптизм в России в 1917—1922 гг. (на материалах Дальнего Востока). В двух томах. — Сахалинский государственный университет. — Южно-Сахалинск, 2014. — V. 1.
- Похороны брата Ивана Степановича Проханова // Евангельская вера: журнал. — 1935. — № 1—12. — P. 50—51.
- Пророчество о России // Христианин: журнал. — Санкт-Петербург, 1906. — № 3. — P. 69.
- Проханов И. С. В котле России (перевод с английского А. М. Бычкова) = In The Cauldron of Russia. — Чикаго: Всемирный Союз Евангельских христиан, 1992. — 111 p.
- Проханов И. С. Евангельский клич// Новая или евангельская жизнь: сборник. — Москва: Христианский центр «Логос», 2009. — P. 90—94. : 10 July 2018.
- Проханов И. С. Евангельское христианство и социальный вопрос. — Петроград, 1918.
- Проханов И. С. Закон и вера: Руководство к устройству религиозных собраний, легализации и управлению всеми гражданскими делами общин, отделившихся от православия. — Издание второе. — СПб.: Издательское товарищество «Радуга», 1912. — 176 p.
- Проханов И. С. Изложение евангельской веры, или Вероучение евангельских христиан / Редакционная Коллегия под председательством И. С. Проханова. — Всесоюзный Совет Евангельских Христиан. — Л. (предположительно): Ленинградский Гублит.
- Проханов И. С. Краткое учение о проповеди. Опыт Евангельской гомилетики. — Корнталь: Свет на Востоке, 1969. — 128 p.
- Проханов И. С. Программа ВСЕХ после моей смерти (моё общее завещание) // Евангельская вера: журнал. — 1935. — № 1—12. — P. 59—62.
- Проханов, Иван Степанович / Агеева Е. А. // Полупроводники — Пустыня [Электронный ресурс]. — 2015. — P. 650. — (Большая российская энциклопедия: [in 35 vol.] / гл. ред. Ю. С. Осипов; 2004—2017, February. 27). — ISBN 978-5-85270-364-4.
- Проханов, Иван Степанович // Протестантизм: Словарь атеиста / Под общ. ред. Л. Н. Митрохина. — М.: Политиздат, 1990. — P. 211. — 319 p. — 200 000 экз. — ISBN 5-250-00373-7.
- Проханов Ярослав Иванович (1902)// Белая книга: О жертвах политических репрессий: книга памяти. — Самара: Самар. Дом печати, 1997. : 10 July 2018.
- Пузынин А. П. Традиция евангельских христиан. Изучение самоидентификации и богословия от момента её зарождения до наших дней. — Москва: Библейско-богословский институт св. апостола Андрея, 2010. — 523 p. — ISBN 978-5-89647-235-3.
- Савинский С. Н. История евангельских христиан баптистов Украины, России, Белоруссии (1867—1917). — Санкт-Петербург: Библия для всех, 1999. — ISBN 5-7454-0376-4.
- Савинский С. Н. История евангельских христиан баптистов Украины, России, Белоруссии. II (1917—1967). — СПб.: Библия для всех, 2001. — 10 000 экз. — ISBN 5-7454-0594-5.
- Шведовский Ф. Интервью: Писатель, главный редактор газеты «Завтра» Александр Проханов о Японии, Ливии, перспективах революции в России, своих церковных взглядах и новом мировоззрении бессмертия // Портал-Credo.Ru. Archive: 30 July 2017.
- Шендеровский Л. Л. Иван Проханов (Биографический очерк). — Торонто: Евангельская вера, 1986. — 220 p.
- Prokhanoff I. S. In The Cauldron of Russia. — All-Russian Evangelical Christian Union. — New York: John Feisberg, Inc., 1933. — 270 p.
