= All-Russian Union of Evangelical Christians =

Russian Evangelical Christian denomination (1911–1944)

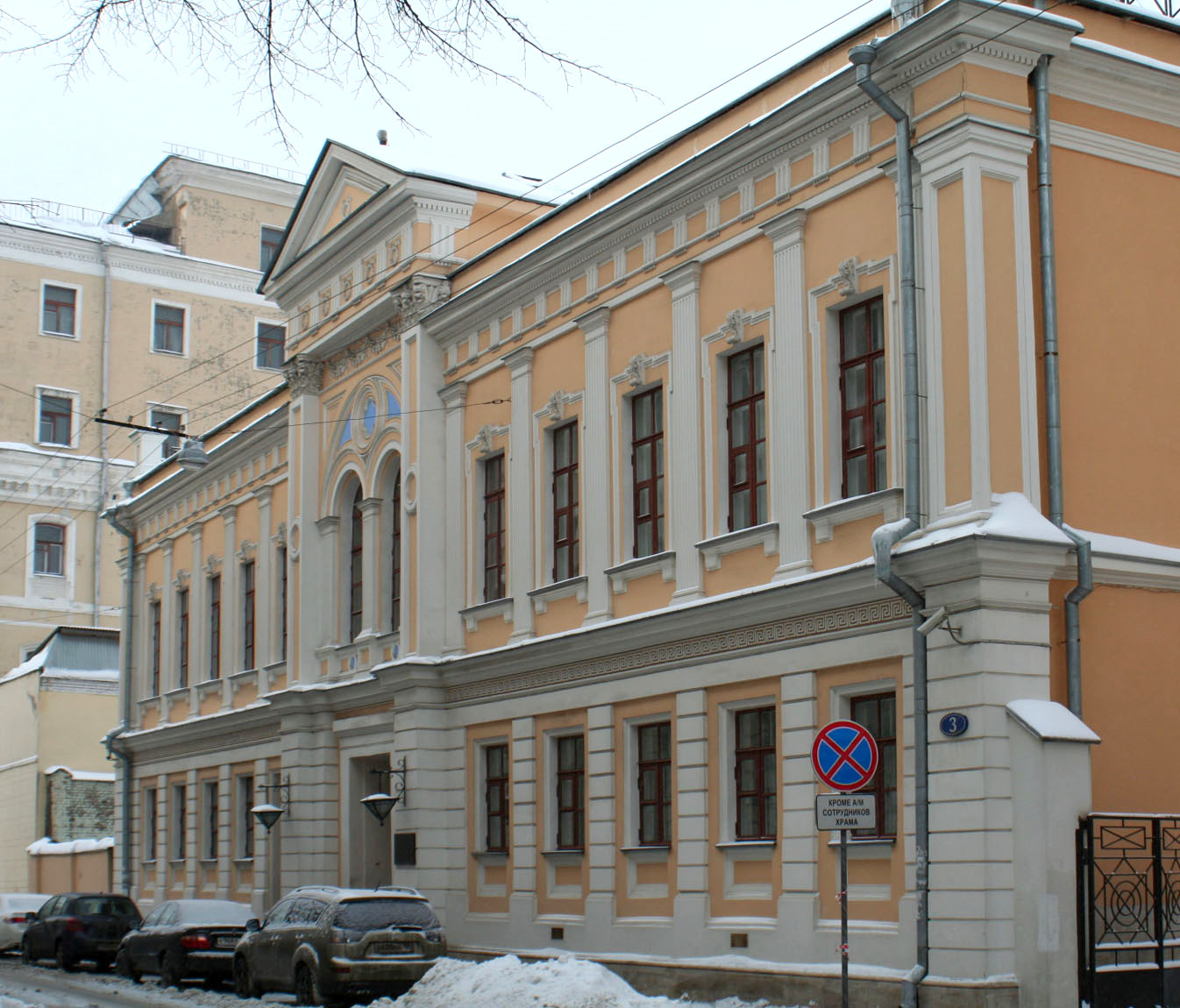
- Building of the Moscow Central Church of ECB, 2011. Since 1917 it has served as the house of prayer of the Moscow Church of Evangelical Christians
- Classification: Evangelical Christians (Prokhanovites)
- Orientation: Baptist doctrine
- Polity: close to Congregationalism
- Associations: Baptist World Alliance
- Region: Russian Empire / Soviet Union
- Language: vernacular languages
- Headquarters: Saint Petersburg / Petrograd / Leningrad; Moscow from 1931
- Origin: 1911; Saint Petersburg, Russian Empire
- Other names: All-Union Council of Evangelical Christians (renamed between 1923 and 1925)

The All-Russian Union of Evangelical Christians (Russian: Всероссийский союз евангельских христиан; renamed, no earlier than 1923 and no later than 1925, the All-Union Council of Evangelical Christians), abbreviated AUEC, was the centralized organization of the Evangelical Christians (Prokhanovites) on the territory of the Russian Empire / Soviet Union.

It existed from 1911 to October 1944 (with a break due to self-dissolution from May 1930 to 23 August 1931). It was abolished on 27 October 1944 as a result of the merger of the Evangelical Christians with the Baptists. On the basis of the AUEC, the AUCECB — the All-Union Council of Evangelical Christians and Baptists — was created.

In 1911 it joined the Baptist World Alliance, and the leader of the AUEC, I. S. Prokhanov, was elected one of the ten vice-presidents of the Baptist World Alliance during the Second Baptist World Congress (Philadelphia, USA, 1911) and remained in that post until 1928.

The AUEC's official publications were the journal Khristianin (The Christian) and the newspaper Utrennyaya Zvezda (Morning Star).

Until 1931 the AUEC's chancery was located in Saint Petersburg (Petrograd, Leningrad); from 1931 it was in Moscow.

== Background ==
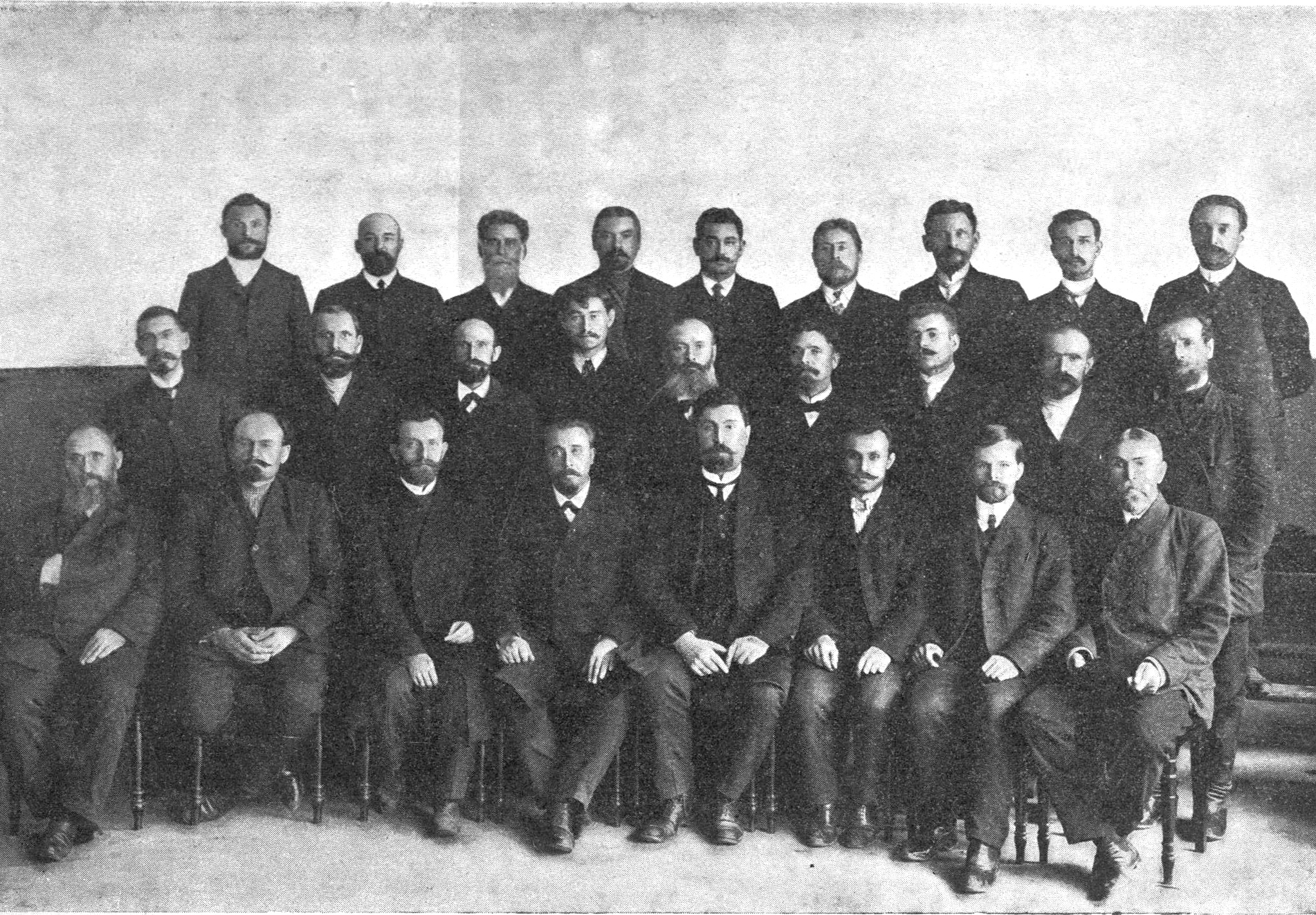
First All-Russian Congress of Evangelical Christians in Saint Petersburg, 14–26 September 1909

In the 1870s a "spiritual awakening" began among the Saint Petersburg aristocracy, sparked by the preaching of the English missionary Lord Granville Radstock, who had been invited to Russia by E. I. Chertkova. Among Baron Radstock's followers were Princess N. F. Lieven, V. F. Gagarina, Count A. P. Bobrinsky, Count M. M. Korf, Colonel V. A. Pashkov, the widow of an aide-de-camp general E. I. Chertkova, Yu. D. Zasetskaya, and others.. Prayer meetings organized by Radstock continued even during his absences from Russia, and were joined by both nobles and townspeople of non-aristocratic origin.

Initially the movement was ecumenical, including Orthodox Christians, Lutherans, and members of other confessions. Stundists, Baptists, and representatives of Russian spiritual Christianity (chiefly the Molokans) were regarded as brethren in Christ. Given the negative attitude of the Russian Orthodox Church and the administrative and criminal persecution of the tsarist government, the Pashkovite movement gradually distanced itself from Orthodoxy and over time increasingly took the form of a separate evangelical denomination.

In the first decade of the 20th century, Ivan Stepanovich Prokhanov, previously baptized in a Baptist church, emerged as the leader of the movement. In 1906–1908 Prokhanov, together with a group of like-minded people, attempted to create the Russian Evangelical Union, which was meant to unite believers of different confessions "who professed the basic evangelical dogmas." Although the Russian Evangelical Union was formally established, it proved unviable, uniting only a few dozen believers. One of the main reasons was the position of some Baptist leaders, who pointed to the doctrinal vagueness of the Union and the inevitable contradictions involved in creating an interdenominational organization.

Prokhanov then began working to create the All-Russian Union of Evangelical Christians — a confessional organization of the Evangelical Christians (Pashkovites) that united believers not at the level of individuals but at the level of local churches and groups. In September 1909 he convened the first All-Russian Congress of Evangelical Christians, which had an advisory character. The actual charter and the doctrine of the All-Russian Union of Evangelical Christians were adopted at the second congress in December 1910 – January 1911.

== Structure ==
The supreme governing body of the AUEC was the All-Russian (later All-Union) Congress of Evangelical Christians. Between congresses, leadership was exercised by the AUEC Council, headed by a chairman. The council had specialized departments (missionary work, publishing, etc.)

Territorial departments were established in the regions, such as the Far Eastern Department of the AUEC, the Siberian Department of the AUEC, and others, as well as smaller regional, oblast, district, and area departments.

By 1931, for example, the Council consisted of five members (chairman, deputy chairman, treasurer, secretary, and a Council member); three candidate members of the council and a three-person Audit Commission were also elected.

Specialized departments were established under the council. For example, in 1922 the following existed:

- Department of Spiritual Affairs (responsible for spiritual work)
- Organizational Department (handled the structural and organizational matters of the Union and its territorial departments)
- Civil Department (handled relations with government authorities and other secular organizations)
- Educational Department
- Music and Singing Department
- Department of Welfare and Material Assistance
- Household Department
- Financial Department.

== Leadership ==
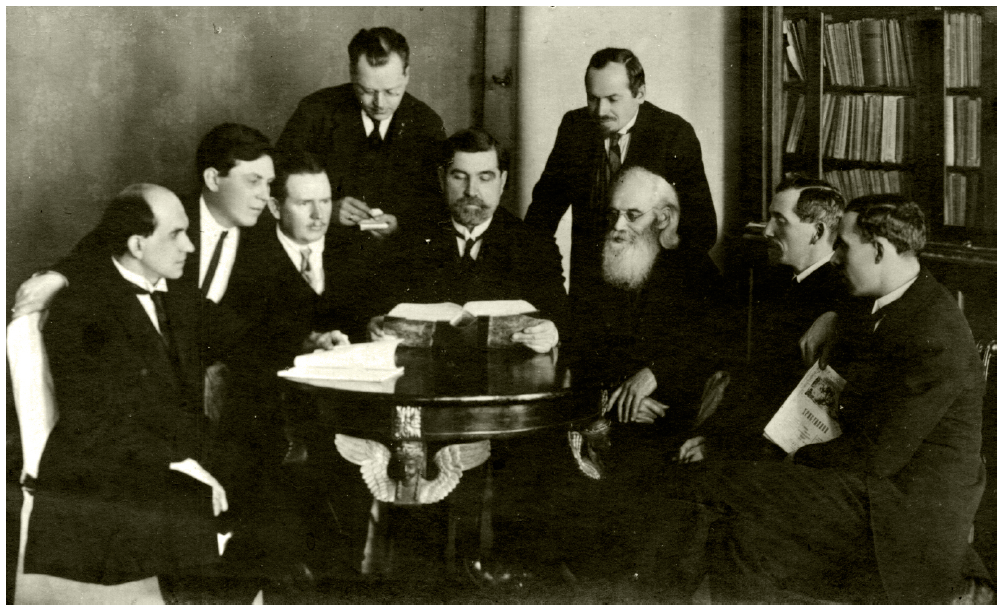
Council of the All-Union Council of Evangelical Christians (Prokhanovites), circa 1927. In the center — I. S. Prokhanov; to his right — I. V. Kargel. Far left — A. V. Karev.

=== Chairmen ===
1911–1931 — I. S. Prokhanov (honorary chairman from 1931)

1931–1938 — Ya. I. Zhidkov

1938–1944 — M. A. Orlov

=== Deputy chairmen ===
1911–1922 (at least) — G. M. Matveyev

1924–1931 — Ya. I. Zhidkov

1926 — V. I. Bykov

from 1931 — A. L. Andreyev

=== Secretaries ===
1926–1931 — P. S. Kapalygin

1931–1935 — A. V. Karev

1931–1938 — M. A. Orlov

== Membership numbers ==
The Union itself did not publish data on the number of church members.

According to information from the Department of Spiritual Affairs of Foreign Confessions of the Russian Empire's Ministry of Internal Affairs, collected through the governors, by 1 January 1912 the total number of "sectarians" in Russia was 399,565. Evangelical Christians were fewer in number than the Voskresniki Molokans (about 134,000), the Baptists (Stundists) (about 115,000), and the Mennonites (about 36,000); there were 30,716 of them counted.

According to a report by AUEC deputy chairman Ya. I. Zhidkov at the 10th All-Union Congress of Evangelical Christians, the number of congregations belonging to the Union grew from 87 in 1909 to 2,500 in 1926.

== Activities ==
=== Congresses ===
To resolve the most important matters of doctrine, missionary work, education, and the internal life of the churches, both All-Russian (All-Union) and territorial congresses were held. The frequency of congresses depended on several factors, chief among them the authorities' willingness to tolerate them. Under favorable external conditions, All-Russian (All-Union) congresses were held annually. In total, 11 All-Russian (All-Union) congresses were held (one of them held jointly by the two unions, the AUEC and the Union of Russian Baptists).

All-Russian (All-Union) Congresses of Evangelical Christians
No.	Date	Location	Delegates	Main agenda items
1	14–24 September 1909	Petersburg	24	Founding of the Bible Institute; establishment of a day of prayer for Christian unity
2	28 December 1910 – 4 January 1911	Petersburg	47	Adoption of the Union's Charter and the "Prokhanovite" confession of faith. Founding of Bible courses
3	31 December 1911 – 4 January 1912	Petersburg	91	Organization of youth circles; questions of intensifying persecution; matters of doctrine
4	17–25 May 1917	Petrograd	More than 100	Creation of the Christian-Democratic Party "Voskreseniye" (Resurrection); questions of unity with the Baptists
5	25 December 1917 – 1 January 1918	Moscow	94	Missionary work; questions of internal church life
6	12–18 October 1919	Petrograd	Up to 90	Missionary work (election of 50 evangelists); questions of the Christian press; unity with the Baptists
7	27 May – 7 June 1920	Moscow	150	International mission (sending evangelists to China and India, and to the national minorities of Russia); merger with the Union of Baptists; opening of Bible courses; conditions for the ordination of presbyters
Joint with the Baptists	1–4 June 1920	Moscow	120	Merger of the two unions (in fact never carried out)
8	1–10 December 1921	Petrograd	142	Election of evangelists; famine relief; unity with the Baptists; on the Bible Institute; on restrictions of religious freedom; on ordination
9	1–10 September 1923	Petrograd	303	Renunciation of Christian pacifism; unity with the Baptists
10	30 November – 6 December 1926	Leningrad	350	Questions of pacifism and duties to the state; unity with the Baptists; Christian labor organizations; spiritual upbringing

=== Evangelism ===
The AUEC placed great importance on evangelism. In addition to calling on believers to preach the Gospel, the AUEC maintained salaried evangelists supported by the Union. Evangelists funded by the Union were elected at the All-Russian (All-Union) Congress; evangelists of the AUEC's territorial departments were elected by territorial congresses.

By 1928, each of the AUEC's territorial departments employed up to 10 evangelists, and in addition the AUEC itself supported about 100 evangelists.

=== Publishing activities ===
Under the aegis of the AUEC, periodicals were published — the newspaper Utrennyaya Zvezda (Morning Star, 1910–1922), the journal Khristianin (The Christian, 1905–1928) and its supplements — Bratsky Listok (Brotherly Leaflet), Molodoy Vinogradnik (Young Vineyard), and Detsky Drug (Children's Friend) — as well as the journal Seyatel (The Sower). The Far Eastern Department of the AUEC published its own journal, Slovo i Zhizn (Word and Life, 1921–1922), in Vladivostok.

In addition, the AUEC published theological books and pamphlets (for example, I. V. Kargel's book Svet iz Teni Budushchikh Blag [Light from the Shadow of Future Blessings]), reference works on religious legislation, poetry and song collections, and calendars.

In 1925–1927 the AUEC managed to print 25,000 copies of the Bible, 20,000 copies of the New Testament, and 15,000 copies of a Symphony (Bible concordance).

=== Training of ministers ===
From 1905, on the proposal of I. S. Prokhanov, six-week courses for preachers were periodically held.

In 1912 the AUEC Council received permission to open two-year Bible courses in Petersburg. Students were recruited the following year and the courses opened, but were interrupted by the First World War.

In 1924 Prokhanov organized one-off nine-month courses in Leningrad, at the House of Salvation, and in 1925 permanent courses opened, with a dormitory for students and apartments for teachers. These courses existed until 1929, when they were disbanded by the authorities during the Stalinist offensive against religion. By that time the courses had trained 400 preachers.

== Temporary suspension of activities ==
Amid intensifying persecution of religion in the USSR, in May 1930 a resolution of the expanded Presidium of the AUEC suspended the Union's activities. AUEC members moved to other work — some to secular occupations, some to ministry within congregations.

A year later, however, on 23 August 1931, at an All-Union conference of Evangelical Christians held in Moscow, a decision was made to petition for the resumption of the Union's activities. Official activity of the AUEC thus continued, though there was no question of work on the former scale. During this period, in the words of religious scholar L. N. Mitrokhin, the AUEC, "despite periodic arrests of the leadership and interruptions in its work, nevertheless continued to eke out a miserable existence."

== End of activities ==
Since the activities of the Union of Russian Baptists had never been resumed, in May 1942 its representatives M. I. Golyaev and N. A. Levindanto proposed that the AUEC take the Baptist congregations under its care. Somewhat later a Provisional Council of Evangelical Christians and Baptists was formed.

On 26–29 October 1944, with the authorities' permission, an All-Union Conference of Evangelical Christians and Baptists was held in Moscow, attended by 45 delegates. Conference participants decided to merge the Evangelical Christians and Baptists into a single Union with an All-Union Council as its governing body. From the AUEC Council, the following joined the new Council: Ya. I. Zhidkov (chairman), M. A. Orlov (one of two deputy chairmen), A. V. Karev (secretary), and A. L. Andreyev (one of three Council members).

== Present day ==
On 1 August 1992, at a congress of church representatives in Moscow, the restoration of the Union of Churches of Evangelical Christians (UCEC) was announced. Nevertheless, most of the congregations that had belonged to the AUEC before 1944 remained in joint associations with the Baptists.

In subsequent years, separate congregations and centralized associations of Evangelical Christians formed in various regions of Russia and other CIS countries, claiming spiritual succession from the AUEC.

At a congress held in Moscow in April 2009, dedicated to the centenary of the Evangelical Christian movement in Russia, it was officially announced that the All-Russian Fellowship of Evangelical Christians had been formed on the basis of a number of such associations and autonomous churches (using the same abbreviation, AUEC, indicating continuity with the historical Union). V. P. Ten was elected chairman of the council, and A. T. Semchenko was elected secretary. Publication of the journal Khristianin (The Christian) resumed as the organ of the newly formed structure.

Ahead of preparations for the Second AUEC Congress, held in April 2011 in Moscow, the membership of the council of the All-Russian Fellowship of Evangelical Christians expanded with new participants, and P. N. Kolesnikov was elected the new chairman of the council.

According to A. P. Puzynin, "at present there are two tendencies within the AUEC: 1) an orientation toward including everyone who calls themselves an 'Evangelical Christian,' and 2) an orientation toward selectively including members of the fellowship on the basis of the fellowship's doctrine, which delimits the boundaries of theology and practices of this faith community."
