= Artha Wacana Christian University =

University in Kupang, Indonesia

The Artha Wacana Christian University
- Type: Private
- Established: 4 September 1985
- Rector: Ir. Godlief Neonufa, MT
- Location: Kupang, Indonesia; 10°08′57″S 123°39′12″E
- Campus: Kupang – Jalan Adisucipto, Oesapa
- Colors: Red and blue
- Website: www.ukaw.ac.id

The Artha Wacana Christian University (UKAW or Universitas Kristen Artha Wacana) is a private university located in Kupang, East Nusa Tenggara, Indonesia.

== History ==
The university was founded on 4 September 1985 in Kupang, East Nusa Tenggara. It is founded as a continuation of Artha Wacana Academy of Theology. 'Artha' can be translated as purpose while 'Wacana' is the word (of God) and as a whole, Artha Wacana Christian University means the university where its purpose comes from the word (of God).

== Organization ==
=== University ===
Artha Wacana's rector is Ir. Godlief Neonufa, MT

=== Schools ===
UKAW is organized into ten faculties, each with a different dean and organization.

- Faculty of Accounting
- Faculty of Law
- Faculty of Management
- Faculty of Management of Marine Resources
- Faculty of Mechanization of Agriculture
- Faculty of English Language Education
- Faculty of Physical Education, Health and Recreation
- Faculty of Technology of The Fishery
- Faculty of Christian Theology
