= Martin Luther Christian University =

Private university in Shillong, Meghalaya, India

Coordinates: 25.5687°N 91.8833°E

- Motto: "We Dare We Rise"
- Type: Private Institution
- Established: 2005; 21 years ago
- Affiliations: UGC, AIU
- Chancellor: Glenn C. Kharkongor
- Vice-Chancellor: Dr. Ashiho A. Mao
- Location: Shillong, Meghalaya, India
- Campus: Urban
- Colours: MLCU Green; Yellow
- Website: www.mlcuniv.in

Martin Luther Christian University is a private university in Shillong, Meghalaya, India. The university is named after Martin Luther (1483–1546), the father of reformation. MLCU was established in July 2005; it is the first Christian university in India after more than two centuries of Christian education in the country that does not focus on theological training. The creation and functioning of the university is in accordance with the University Grants Commission Act, 1956, under Section 2(f).

Martin Luther Christian University was created by Act No.11 of 2005 of the Legislative Assembly of Meghalaya and received the assent of the Governor on July 6, 2005. The Government of Meghalaya issued the gazette notification on February 22, 2006. The creation of the university is in accordance with the University Grants Commission (UGC) Act, 1956 under Section 2(f) and the university is empowered to grant degrees underSection22 of the UGC Act.

MLCU is recognized by the UGC vide a notification and the University has been granted Reg.No.284. Several students and graduates of MLCU have been awarded JRF, NET and merit scholarships by the UGC. Many graduates of MLCU are pursuing their higher studies in universities and institutions in different parts of the country and abroad.

== Accreditation ==
Martin Luther Christian University was created by Act No. 11 of 2005 of the Legislative Assembly of Meghalaya. The Government of Meghalaya issued the Gazette Notification on February 22, 2006. The creation of the university is in accordance with the University Grant Commission Act, 1956 under Section 2(f) and the university is empowered to grant degrees under Section 22 of the UGC Act.

== Awards ==
Martin Luther Christian University, Shillong have been awarded with honours in the field of education since the adoption of National Education Policy 2020 and is the first educational institution to implement this policy in the state of Meghalaya. The university have been listed in the top 10 percent of private universities in India since 2019. Some of the Rankings MLCU achieved since 2019 are as follows:-

1. Ranked 1st in Meghalaya as "Private Multidisciplinary University" by EducationWorld (2022-2023)
2. Ranked 10th in the "Student Diversity" category of EducationWorld; in Higher Education Grand Jury Awards that promotes admission of students from varied socio-economic backgrounds, cultures and nationalities. (2019-2020).
3. Ranked 7th in "Promising Future-Ready Universities" by EducationWorld (2021-2022)
4. Rank 48/526 private universities in India as per the annual rankings survey published in Outlook Magazine on 24 August 2023.
5. Ranked 67th in the top bracket among private and deemed universities by India Today in its Aug 14 2023 issue.
6. Ranked 41/100 in 2020-2021 and Ranked 59/100 among the top 100 Private universities in the country in the EducationWorld (EW) India Higher Education Ranking 2022-2023.
7. MLCU Scored 360/400 marks for Academic Excellence and 173/200 in placement as surveyed by outlook Magazine 2023.

== See also ==
- William Carey University
