= Southern Christian University =

Southern Christian University may refer to:

- Universidad Cristiana del Sur, in Costa Rica, Southern Christian University
- Amridge University, in the United States, formerly known as Alabama Christian School of Religion, Southern Christian University, and Regions University
