= St. Petersburg Christian University =

University in Saint Petersburg, Russia

Coordinates: 59.9047°N 30.2719°E

- Motto: At the service of the Church and of society
- Type: Private
- Established: 1990
- Affiliations: Council for Christian Colleges and Universities
- Location: St. Petersburg, Russia
- Campus: Urban
- Website: Official website

St. Petersburg Christian University (SPbCU) is an interdenominational Evangelical Christian University located in St. Petersburg, Russia.

== History ==
The school was founded in 1990 as a bible college in Belorechensk, Krasnodar Krai by the Russian Union of Evangelical Christians-Baptists. In 1992, the school moved to St. Petersburg, Russia. In 1993, the school became an interdenominational Evangelical Christian University.
