= Greece–Israel relations =

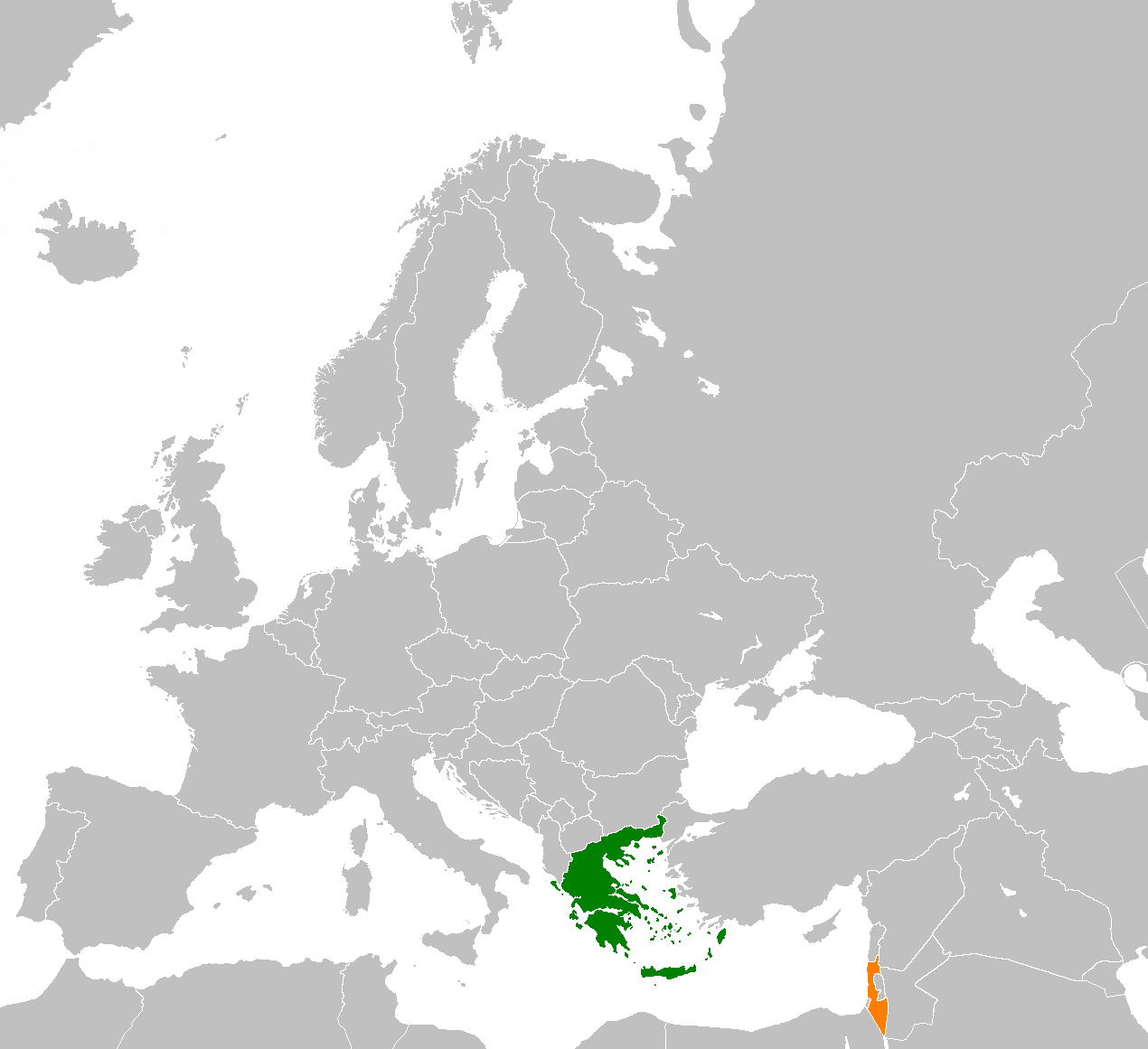
- Greece: Israel

Diplomatic mission
- Embassy of Greece, Tel Aviv: Embassy of Israel, Athens

Greece and Israel have extensive diplomatic, military, intelligence and economic relations and are considered allies. Both countries are part of the proposed Energy Triangle to deliver oil and gas extracted from Israel and Cyprus to mainland Europe with a pipeline through Greece. The deterioration of Israel's relations with Turkey following the 2010 Gaza flotilla raid and during the Gaza genocide and war has contributed to the strengthening of Greek-Israeli relations. Both countries are partners in the Organization for Security and Co-operation in Europe (OSCE), and members of the Union for the Mediterranean, the World Trade Organization (WTO) and other international organizations. Israel is the second largest importer of Greek products in the Middle East.

While a mid-2024 poll found that 61% of Greeks considered Israel an ally of Greece, two 2026 polls reported that 65% or more of Greeks viewed Israel negatively, amid global backlash during the Gaza genocide and war.

== History ==
=== 1940s ===
Along with Cuba, Greece was one of only two Christian-majority nations to vote against the United Nations Partition Plan for Palestine. This was mainly in order not to damage Greek-Arab economic ties, and to avert a threat to expel the Egyptian Greek community (which would eventually happen after Nasser's coming to power).

Following the signing of armistice agreements confirming Israel's survival in the aftermath of the 1948 Arab–Israeli War, Greece de facto recognized the State of Israel on 15 March 1949, and it was diplomatically represented in Tel Aviv on a lower-than-embassy level.

=== 1960–70s ===
Relations between Israel and Greece slightly improved during the rule of the Greek junta from 1967 to 1974. The junta praised the "martial aspects of the Israeli state" and assisted the United States in supporting Israel during the Six-Day War. Greece also sent a consul to Jerusalem during this period, but refrained from granting full recognition to balance its relations with the Arab states.

=== 1980–90s ===
Particularly under Prime Minister Andreas Papandreou's terms in 1981–89 and 1993–96, tensions existed between Greece and Israel due to Greece's traditional support of the Palestinians. In 1982, the Greek government coordinated with Yasser Arafat, leader of the Palestine Liberation Organization, to allow his evacuation from Tripoli, Lebanon, to Athens by Greek ships when Israel invaded Lebanon. Israeli military cooperation with Turkey and controversies over the Greek Orthodox Patriarchate in Jerusalem also dampened relations.

In the 1990s, efforts were made to improve ties between the two countries. Greece formally recognized Israel in 1990 under Prime Minister Konstantinos Mitsotakis and their first defense cooperation agreement was signed in 1994, although it was never implemented. Bilateral trade doubled between 1989 and 1995. That year Israel, exported $200 million worth of chemicals and oil products to Greece and imported $150 million worth of cement, food, and building materials.

=== 2000–2010s ===
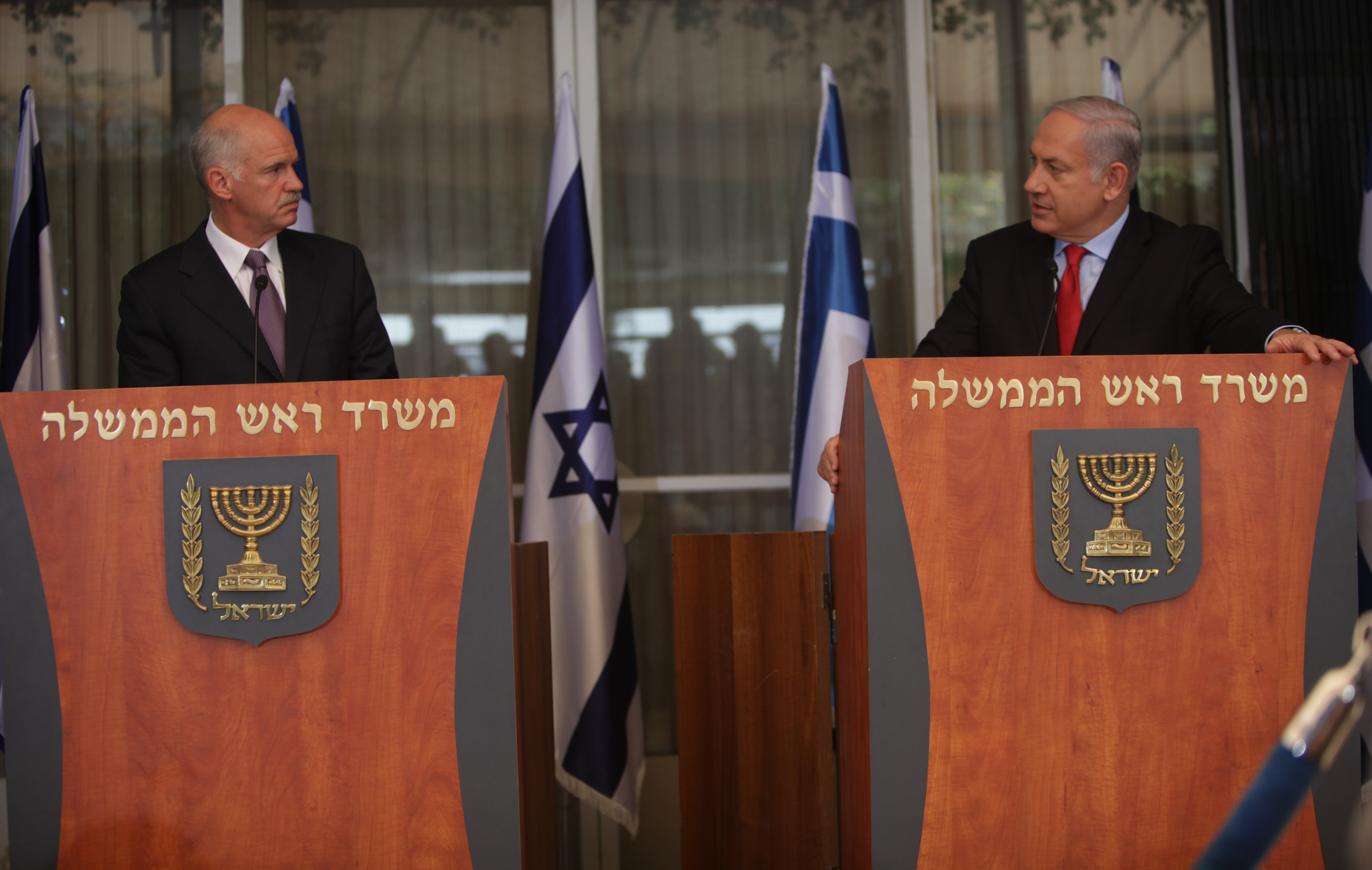
Prime Minister of Greece George Papandreou and Prime Minister of Israel Benjamin Netanyahu in July 2010.

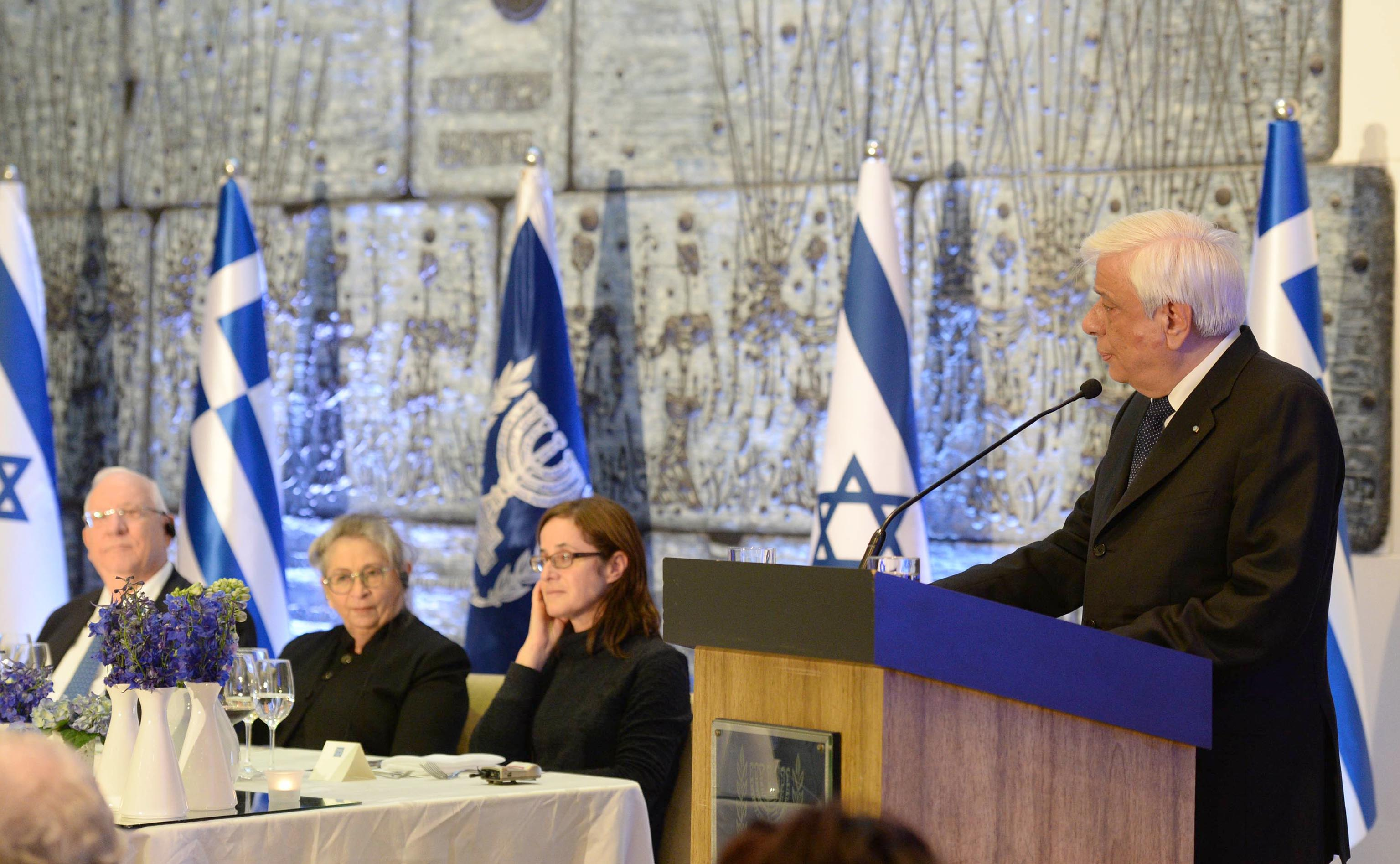
President of Greece Prokopis Pavlopoulos and President of Israel Reuven Rivlin in March 2016.

Relations between Greece and Israel further grew due to the decline of Israeli-Turkish relations under the AK Party of Recep Tayyip Erdoğan, in power in Turkey since 2002, especially in the aftermath of the Gaza flotilla raid in May 2010. Greece's desire to increase its deterrent power against Turkey and the improvement in U.S.-Greece relations were also factors.

In 2006, President Moshe Katsav visited Greece, in what was the first official visit by an Israeli head of state. In July 2010, Greek Prime minister George Papandreou (son of Andreas Papandreou) made an official visit to Israel.

In August 2010, Prime Minister of Israel Benjamin Netanyahu became the first Israeli Prime Minister to visit Greece. On his two-day tour, Netanyahu and Greek Prime Minister George Papandreou discussed greater cooperation between the nations' militaries, defense industries and economies.

In January 2011 Foreign Minister of Israel Avigdor Liberman made a state visit to Athens. During that visit, the two countries reportedly set up a joint committee to study ways of improving cooperation on strategic and anti-terror issues.

In June 2017 Prime Minister Netanyahu paid an official visit to Thessaloniki, meeting with members of the city's ancient Jewish community and visiting the historic Monastir synagogue.

=== 2020s ===
On January 2, 2020, the Prime Ministers of Greece, Cyprus and Israel signed the EastMed pipeline deal in Athens.

In May 2021, an agreement was reached after a government-to-government negotiation for the establishment of the International Flight Training Center within the Kalamata Air Base premises in Kalamata, Greece. The €1.375 billion deal includes a 22-year public-private partnership with Israeli military company Elbit Systems to modernize Greece’s pilot training capabilities.

The Greek state surveillance scandal, first revealed in 2022, in which the Mitsotakis government deployed Predator spyware against political targets, led to scrutiny of the spyware's link to former Israeli intelligence figures and the role of Israel in exporting private spyware to foreign governments.

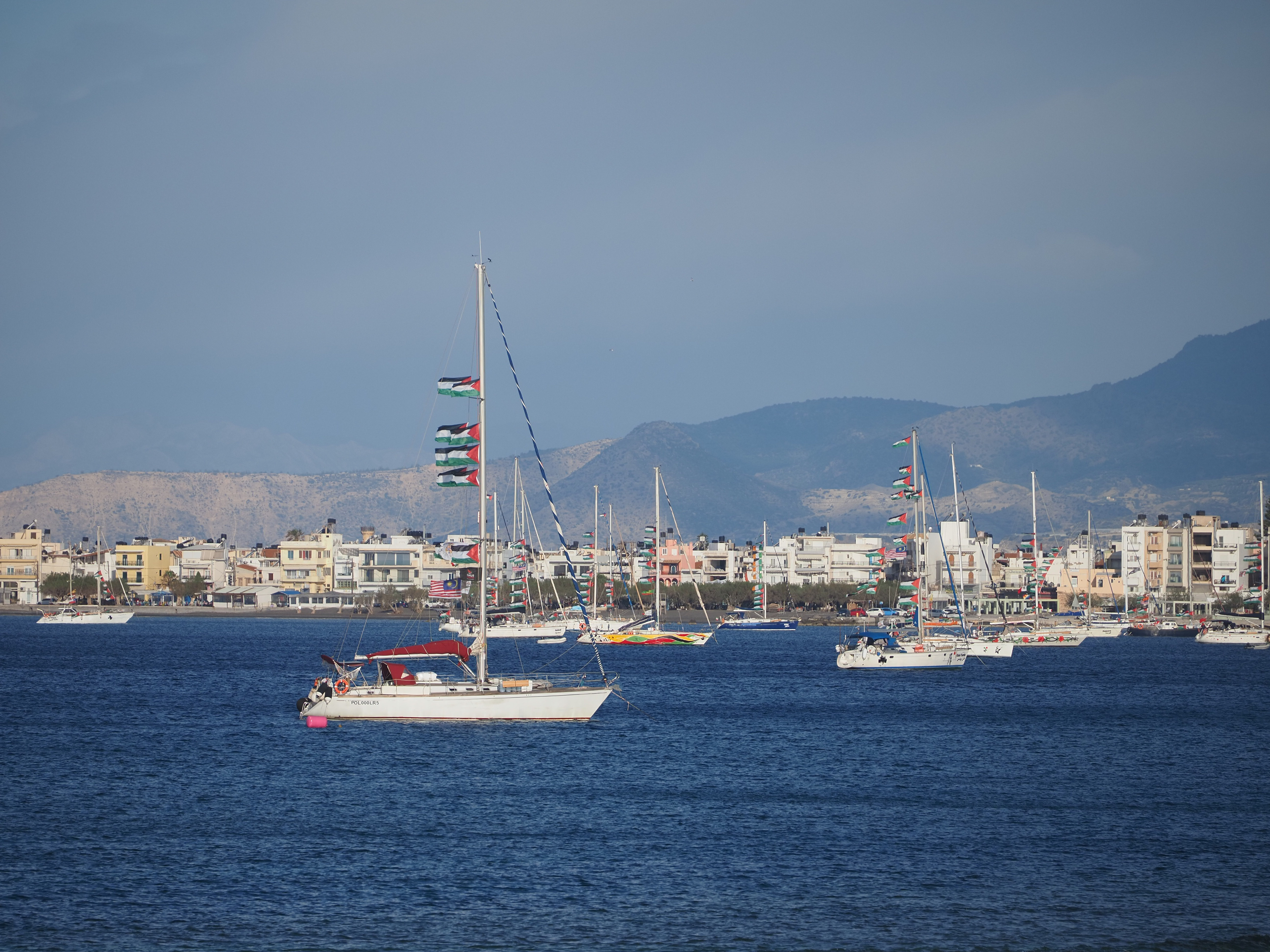
The 2026 Global Sumud Flotilla in Ierapetra, Crete, on 3 May 2026, after its interception offshore by the IDF.

Relations between Greece and Israel continued to strengthen, with Greece abstaining to vote on the October 2023 UN General Assembly resolution for a humanitarian truce and aid access during the Gaza war and a visit to Tel Aviv by Prime Minister Kyriakos Mitsotakis later that month.

In April-May 2026, Greece allowed the release in Crete of around 175 Global Sumud Flotilla members who had been detained by Israeli forces in international waters in the Greek search and rescue zone, while en route to deliver humanitarian aid to Gaza.

== Military collaboration ==
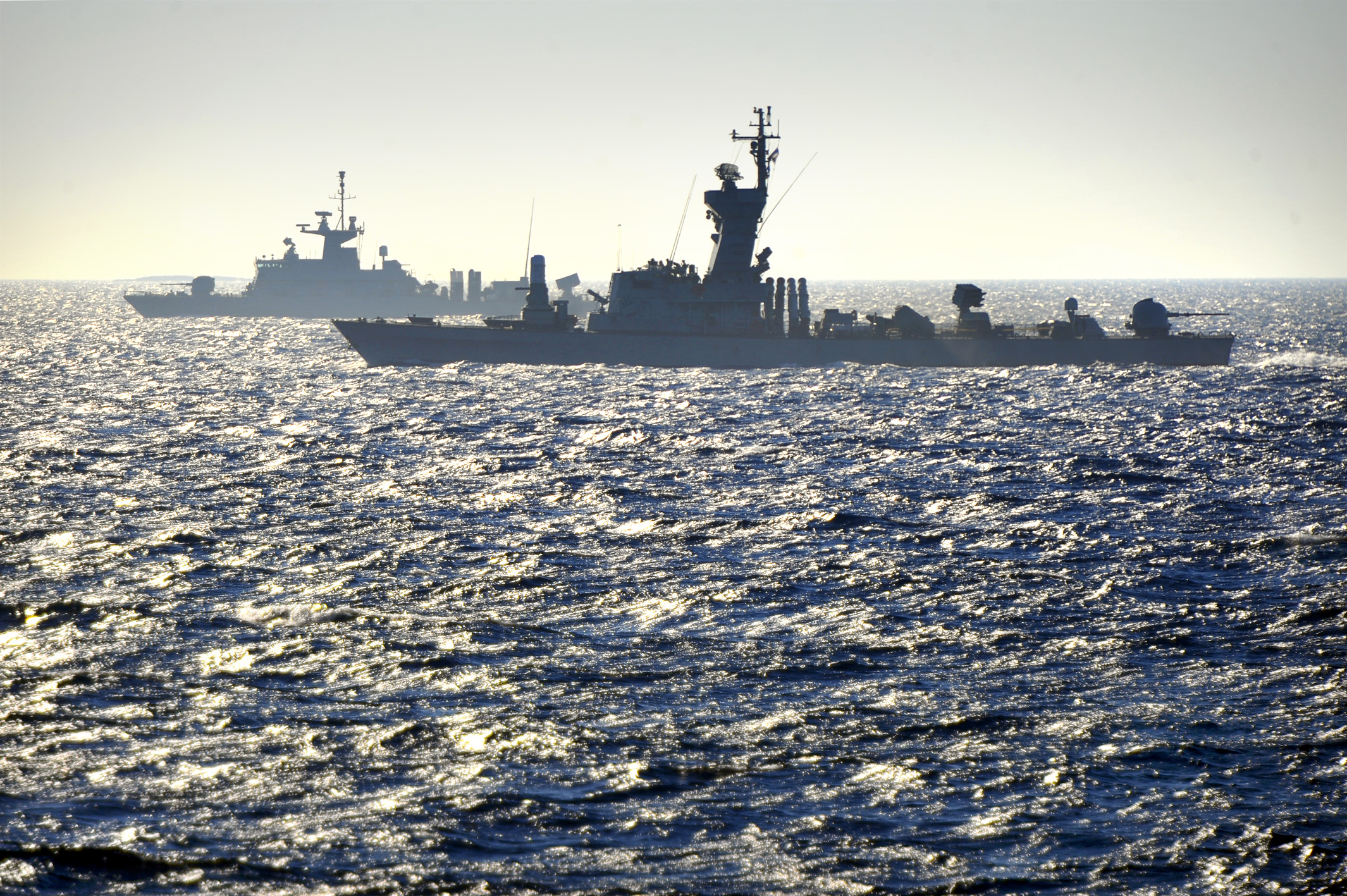
The Israeli and Greek Navy joined forces near Piraeus

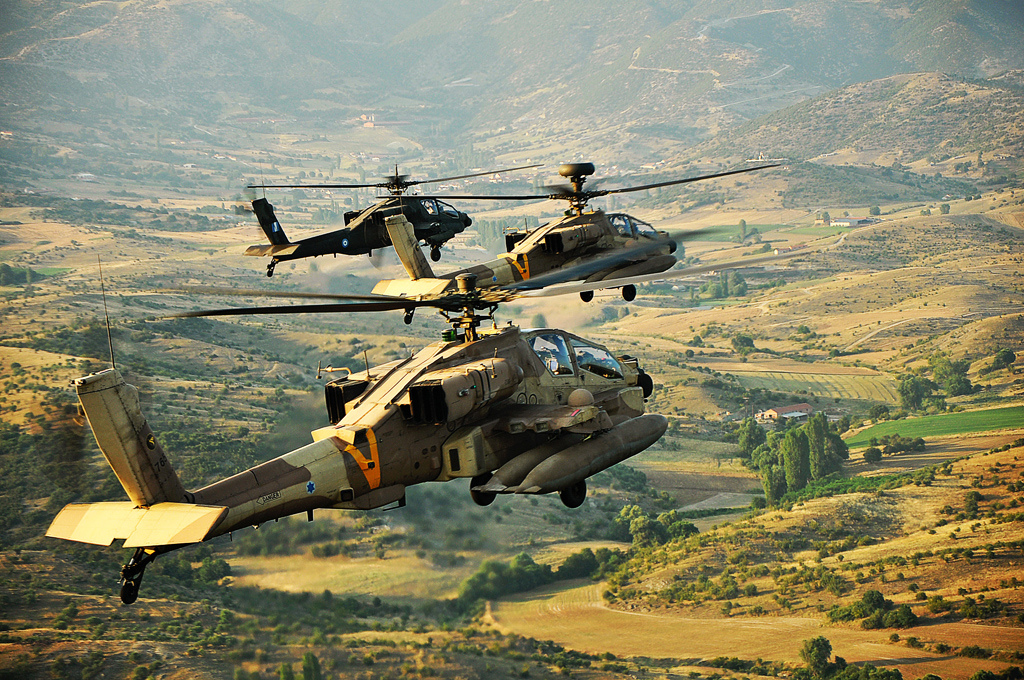
Two Israeli Air Force Apache Longbows alongside a Greek Apache during a joint exercise, June 2011

In October 2010, the Israeli and Greek air forces trained jointly in Greece. According to the BBC, this signified a boost in ties that was due in large part to Israel's rift with Turkey.

Israeli President Shimon Peres thanked Greece for its role in thwarting the planned second Gaza flotilla in 2011.

In November 2011, the Israeli Air Force hosted Greece's Hellenic Air Force in a joint exercise at the Uvda base. Greece sent five F-16 block 52 fighter jets for a five-day exercise, which included practice air fights as well as ground attacks. Israeli F-15 and F-16 fighter jets also participated in the exercise, along with Boeing fuel supplier airplanes. Similar training was held in 2012 by the IAF in cooperation with the Hellenic Air Force in the Peloponnese and parts of southern Greece in response to the need of the IAF to train pilots in unfamiliar areas.

On March 14, 2013, the navies of Israel, Greece and the US held a two-week joint military exercise for the third year in a row. The annual operation is nicknamed Noble Dina and was established in 2011. Similar to Noble Dina in 2012, the exercise in 2013 included defending offshore natural gas platforms and simulated air-to-air combat and anti-submarine warfare.

Also, on March 27, 2017, Israel participated in the large-scale Iniohos military exercise, which is organized annually by Greece, along with the USA, Italy and the United Arab Emirates. It also joined the exercise in 2019.

=== Blue Flag exercise ===
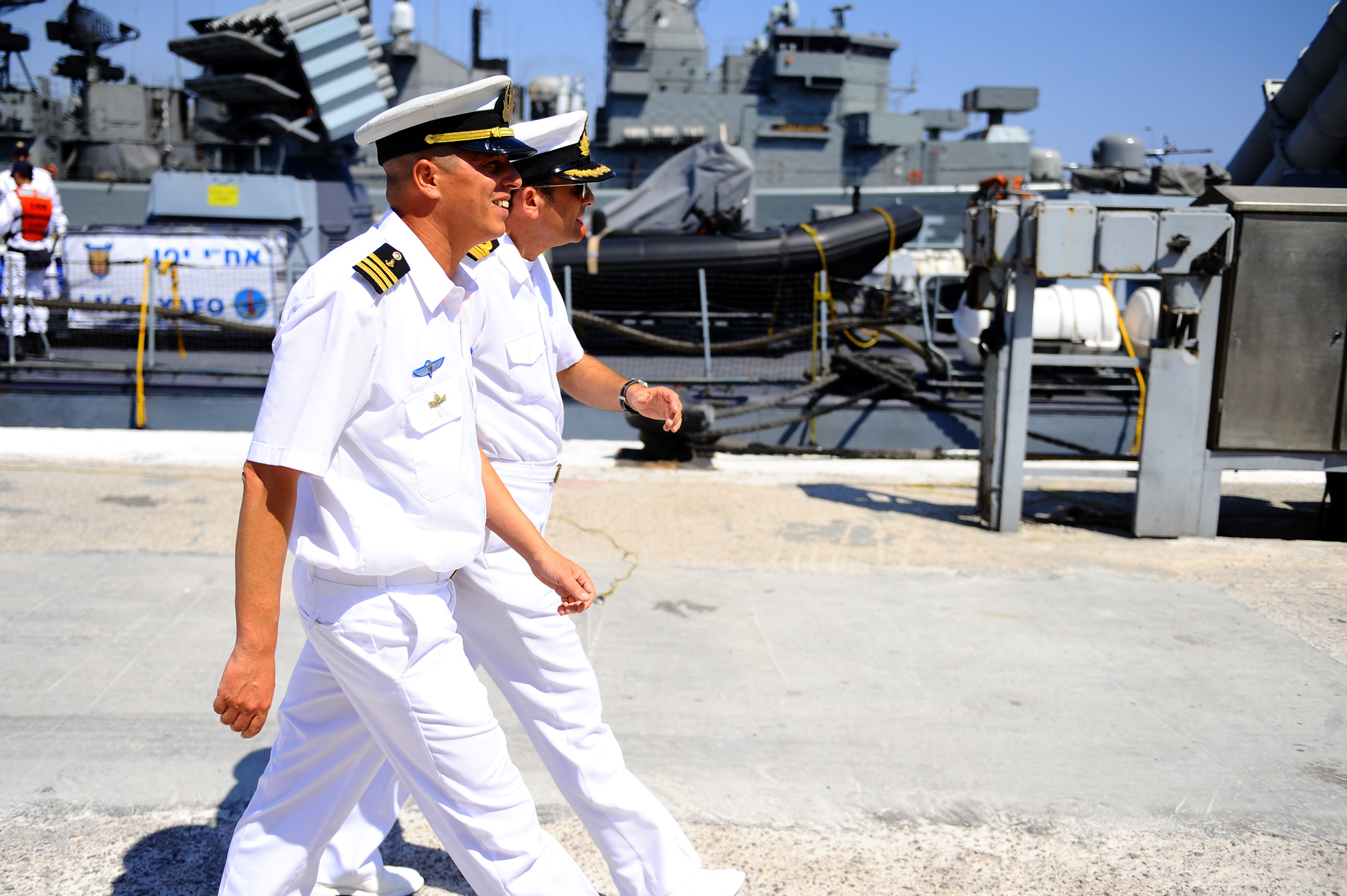
Israeli and Greek naval officers in May 2012, when the two navies conducted a joint-drill near Piraeus

In November 2013, Israel hosted a "massive" aerial-maneuver drill, code-named "Blue Flag," at the Ovda air base, near the southern city of Eilat, in the Negev Desert, modeled after the US Air Force's annual Red Flag exercise. The exercise included seven combat squadrons from the Israeli Air Force and one squadron each from the air forces of Greece, the United States, and Italy. Half of Israel's air space had been closed to traffic for the exercise, from approximately the center of the country southwards. Pilots practised attacks on enemy bases and tactics for defeating anti-aircraft measures, such as shoulder-held missiles, advanced surface-to-air missiles, and radar systems. Observers to the drill included military attachés and political representatives from Cyprus and Bulgaria.

=== Opening of military attaché office in Athens ===
In April 2014 the IDF and the Ministry of Defense of Israel announced the closure of their military attaché office in Switzerland during the summer of 2014. It was decided to open a new military attaché office in Greece due to the growing military cooperation between the two countries and as a counterweight to the decline of defense relations with Turkey. Until April 2014 the military attaché in Italy was also responsible for transactions and security relations in Greece, but after the announcement of the decision Athens will host a permanent military attaché who will address security relations between Greece and Israel directly.

=== Status of forces agreement ===
Greece is one of only three countries Israel has signed a status of forces agreement (SOFA), with the other being the United States and Cyprus. The agreement enables Israel in hosting Greek military forces in its territory or stationing Israeli military forces in the territory of Greece, as part of the military agreements and comprehensive security arrangements between the two countries.

=== Cooperation on anti-drone systems and cybersecurity ===
In January 2026, Greece and Israel agreed to deepen their defence cooperation with a focus on counter-unmanned systems and cybersecurity. Greek Defence Minister Nikos Dendias and Israeli Defence Minister Israel Katz announced that the two countries would exchange technical expertise and collaborate on systems to counter swarms of unmanned aerial and underwater drones, and strengthen readiness against cyber threats following talks in Athens. The initiative builds on existing military ties, including joint exercises and the operation of an air training centre in Greece, and is part of broader efforts to enhance bilateral defence collaboration amid evolving security challenges in the Eastern Mediterranean.

In July of the same year, Greece approved a €3.5 billion agreement to acquire a new multi-layered air defence system based on Israeli defence technology. The "Achilles Shield" system is expected to include Israeli-made radar and missile systems developed by Rafael Advanced Defense Systems and Israel Aerospace Industries, and further capabilities like counter-drone technology.

On 31 August 2026, Israel and Greece signed a €3 billion defense agreement, worth more than NIS 10 billion, under which Israel would develop and deliver a "multi-layered" national air-defense system for Greece as part of the Achilles Shield project. The system would integrate David's Sling, BARAK MX, and SPYDER missile-defense systems, alongside IAI radars and a command-and-control system developed by Rafael Advanced Defense Systems. The deal signed between the two nations is part of a plan by Greece to spend €28 billion overall by 2036 for a comprehensive system to protect the country from attack by aircraft, ballistic missiles and drones.

== Energy cooperation ==
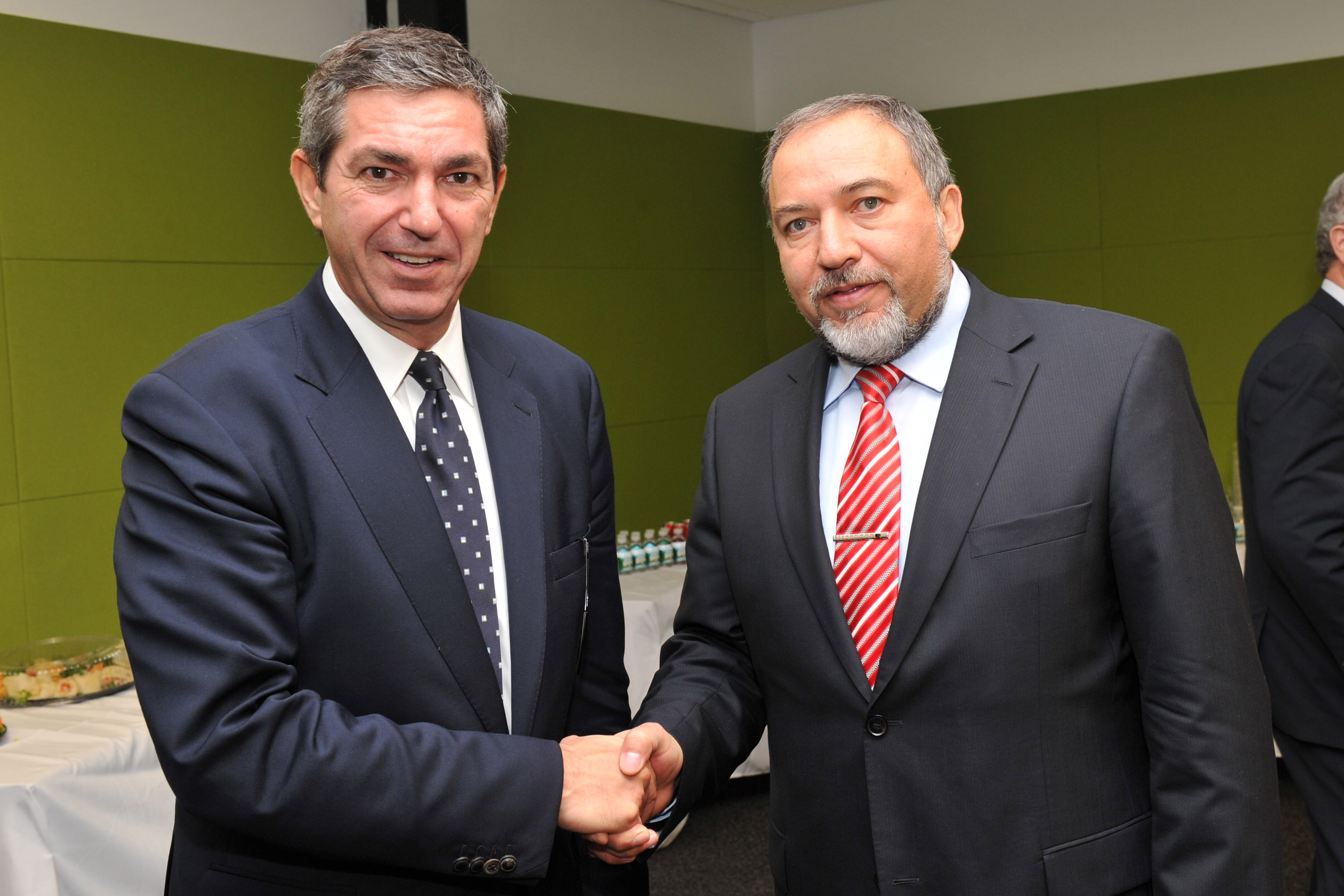
Greek Foreign Minister Lambrinidis (left) and Israeli Foreign Minister Avigdor Lieberman during a break in the 66th U.N. General Assembly, 2011.

The joint Cyprus-Israel oil and gas explorations centered on the Leviathan gas field are also an important factor for Greece, given its strong links with Cyprus. ΔΕΗ-Quantum Energy, a Cyprus-based group including Greece's state-controlled power utility Public Power Corporation of Greece (PPC, also known as ΔΕΗ) is planning to lay the world's longest subsea power cable, linking Israel, Cyprus and Greece. The link, called the EuroAsia Interconnector project, would be the longest in the world. The tripartite energy memorandum of understanding came after nearly a year of negotiations and was signed in Nicosia, Cyprus, by Energy and Water Resources Minister Silvan Shalom; Nicos Kouyialis, the Cypriot minister of agriculture, natural resources and environment; and George Lakkotrypis, the Greek minister for the environment, energy and climate change.

On 8 August, Greece, Israel and Cyprus signed the tripartite energy memorandum of understanding after the completion of one year of negotiation in Nicosia. Negotiations were held between the Energy and Water Resources Minister of Israel Silvan Shalom, the Cypriot minister of agriculture, natural resources and environment Nicos Kouyialis and the Greek minister of environment, energy and climate change George Lakkotrypis. The 2,000-mega-watt EuroAsia Interconnector is planned to lift Cyprus and Israel out of energy isolation through cheaper electricity as supported by George Lakkotrypis. Silvan Shalom announced that the agreement is "historic" and said that it demonstrated the powerful relations between the three countries, adding that the electric conduit will become a cable and is going to export electricity to the European energy market. The Greek Prime Minister Antonis Samaras proclaimed in 2013 that Israel has a special role to play in supplying Europe with energy resources and supported that it can become a key energy hub.

=== Electricity connection between Cyprus, Israel and Greece ===
Electricity connection between Hadera of Israel and Vasilikos in Cyprus is one of the projects that will be funded by the European Union in the framework of the programme Connecting Europe Facility. According to a press release issued by the European Commission the amount earmarked for the Hadera Israel-Vasilikos Cyprus connection is approximately €1.325m. The European Commission on February 17, 2017. approved €14.5 million as financial support for final detailed studies prior to Project Implementation. The project is based on an undersea cable for the connection of the electricity systems of Israel, Cyprus and Greece. Its capacity will be 2000 MW and its length approximately 1518 km. It will include three connections: 329 km between Israel and Cyprus, 879 km between Cyprus and Crete and 310 km between Crete and mainland Greece. It will allow electricity transmission in both directions.

== Economic relations ==
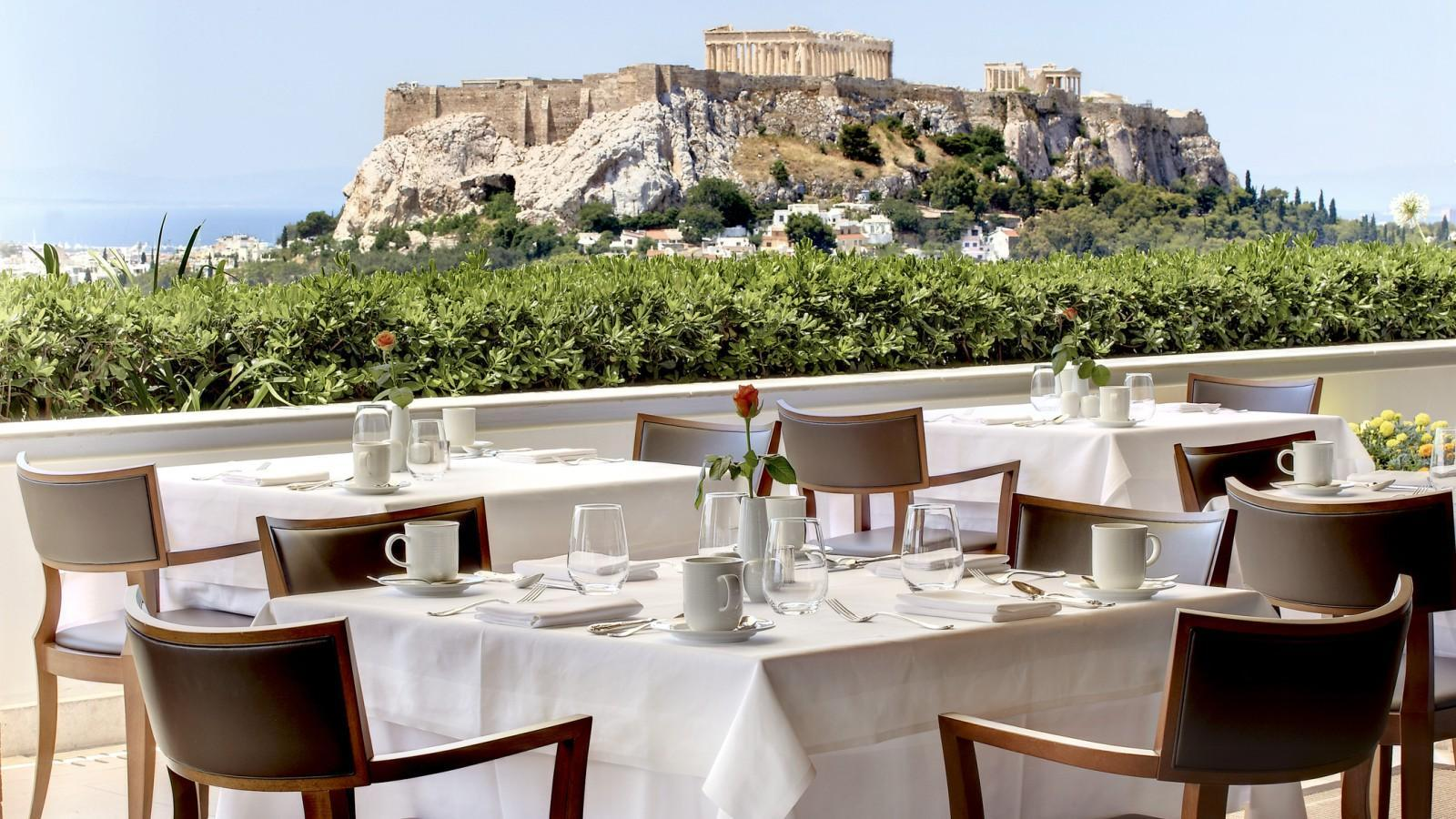
A hotel rooftop in Athens. Israeli investors have bought properties and hotels in the city.

Trade between Greece and Israel was $1.3 billion in 2024, growing from $920 million in 2023. Greek exports to Israel were $900 million, led by metal products and electrical equipment; Israeli exports to Israel were $350 million, led by refined petroleum and other chemicals and metal products.

In the 2020s, there has been extensive Israeli investment in the Greek property sector and it is estimated at over €500 million annually. This has included purchases of hotels in the tourism industry and investments as part of the Greek golden visa scheme. During the Gaza war, 10,000 Israelis have relocated to Greece.

Greece is a major travel destination for Israelis. In 2025, Greece was the top international destination for air passengers from Israel, with 2.2 million, while in 2024, 621,000 Israelis visited Greece and spent €419 million. Cruise ships with Israeli tourists entering Greek ports faced disruption by anti-genocide and pro-Palestine protesters in 2025 and 2026.

== Cooperation between Israeli and Greek lobbies in the United States ==
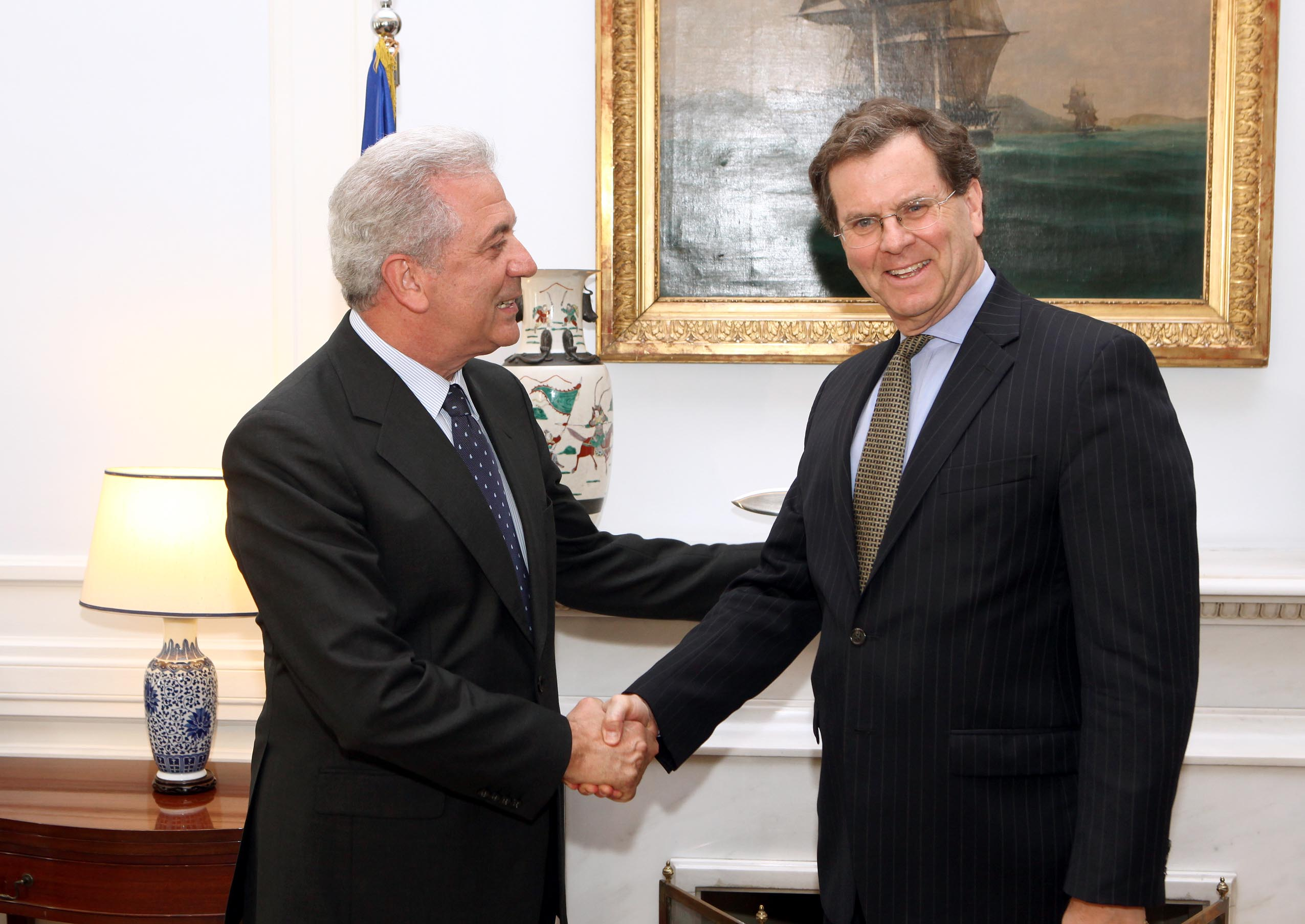
Foreign Minister Dimitris Avramopoulos meeting with David Harris, the President of the Organisation of American Jewish Committee in Athens in July 2012

A new joint action committee for the Greek-Israeli alliance was created in the U.S. Congress in early 2013. The creation and goals of the Greek-Israeli Caucus under the name Congressional Hellenic-Israel Alliance were announced at a special event held in the Congress. It is co-chaired by Congress members Gus Bilirakis the Republican representative from Florida and Ted Deutch the Democrat from Florida, and the Greek-Israeli Caucus consists of powerful members of both Republican and Democratic party. It was estimated that it may become the most important pressure group in Congress by 2014.

On 13 March 2013 in Washington the Israeli ambassador Michael Oren hosted the launching of a new congressional grouping dedicated to improving Israeli-Greek-Cypriot ties. Attending the launch were the co-chairmen of the newly established Hellenic-Israel Caucus, Ted Deutch and Gus Bilirakis as well as lawmakers including John Sarbanes and Eliot Engel, the senior Democrat on the US House of Representatives Foreign Affairs Committee. Israeli Ambassador Michael Oren in his remarks at the dinner at his residence touted shared economic and strategic interests among Greece, Cyprus and Israel. The Greek ambassador Christos Panagopoulos in Washington announced that cooperation among the three countries would bring "peace, stability and prosperity" to the region. Also addressing the event was Olympia Neocleous, the chargé d'affaires at the Cypriot embassy in Washington.

With the passing of Greek-American community leader Andrew Athens, President of the World Council of Hellenes, the American Jewish Committee has commemorated his work to advance Greek-Jewish and Hellenic-Israeli ties. The most recent occasion occurred in recognition of Athens' 90th birthday before AJC's National Board of Governors and invited guests from the political and diplomatic communities, in his hometown of Chicago in 2011. Partnering early on with his friend Maynard Wishner, a fellow Chicagoan and AJC national leader, Athens spearheaded a number of joint AJC and Greek-American delegations to Greece, Cyprus and Israel.

== Agricultural cooperation ==
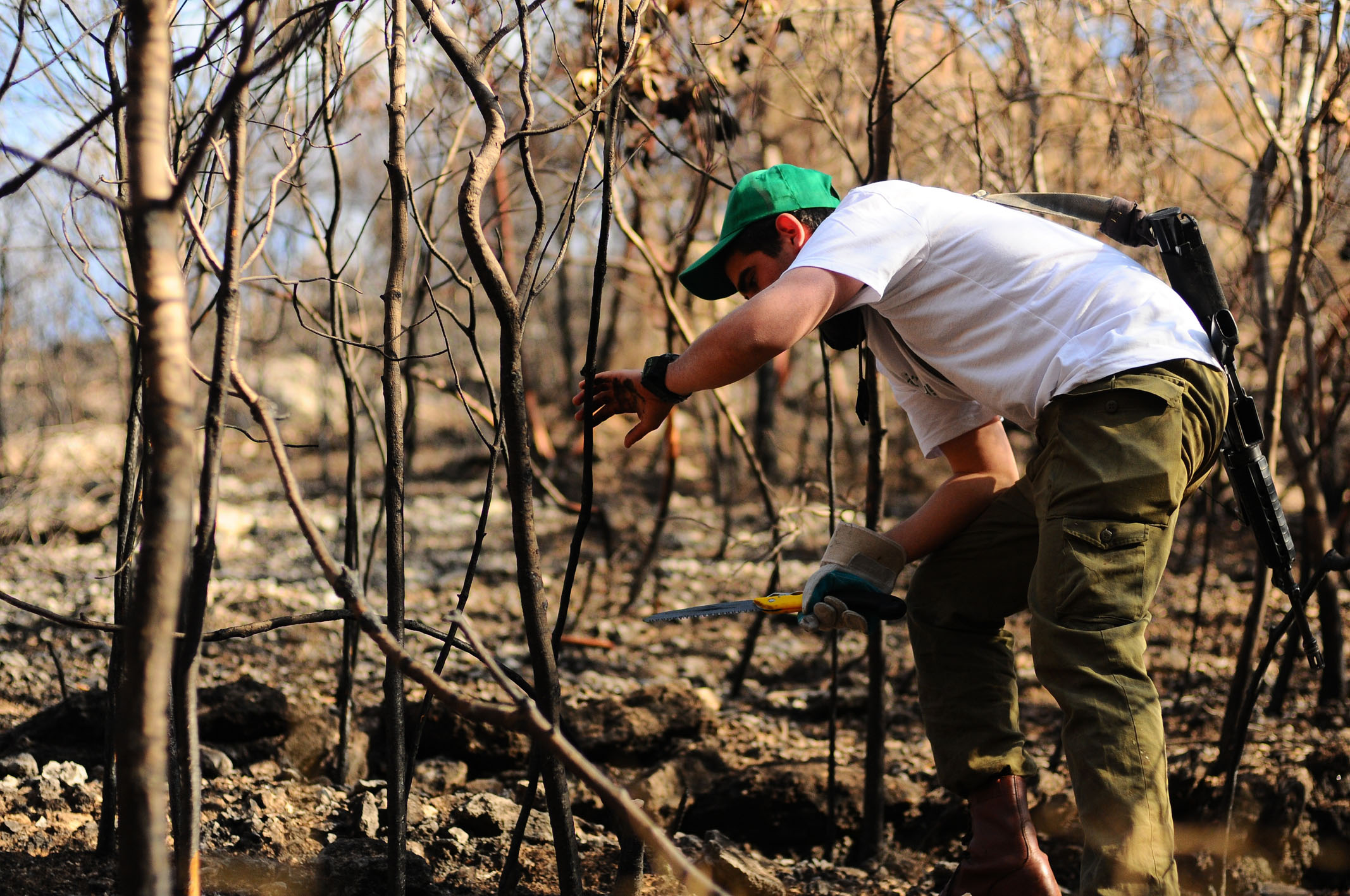
Firefighting delegation with airplanes and helicopters from Greece rallied to help Israel stop the spread of the fires in 2010.

The arid topography of Israel has spurred Israeli scientists to develop innovative farming methods and desalination technologies. The start of an efficient desalination by Israeli scientists as planned will be a boost to many of Greece's islands such as Santorini that suffer inadequate freshwater reserves and must often rely on shipped water. Agricultural Development and Foods Minister Athanassios Tsaftaris in a visit to Israel with Israeli Agriculture and Rural Development Minister Orit Noked in 2011 emphasised that both governments are very interested in further boosting agricultural development.

== Cultural relations ==
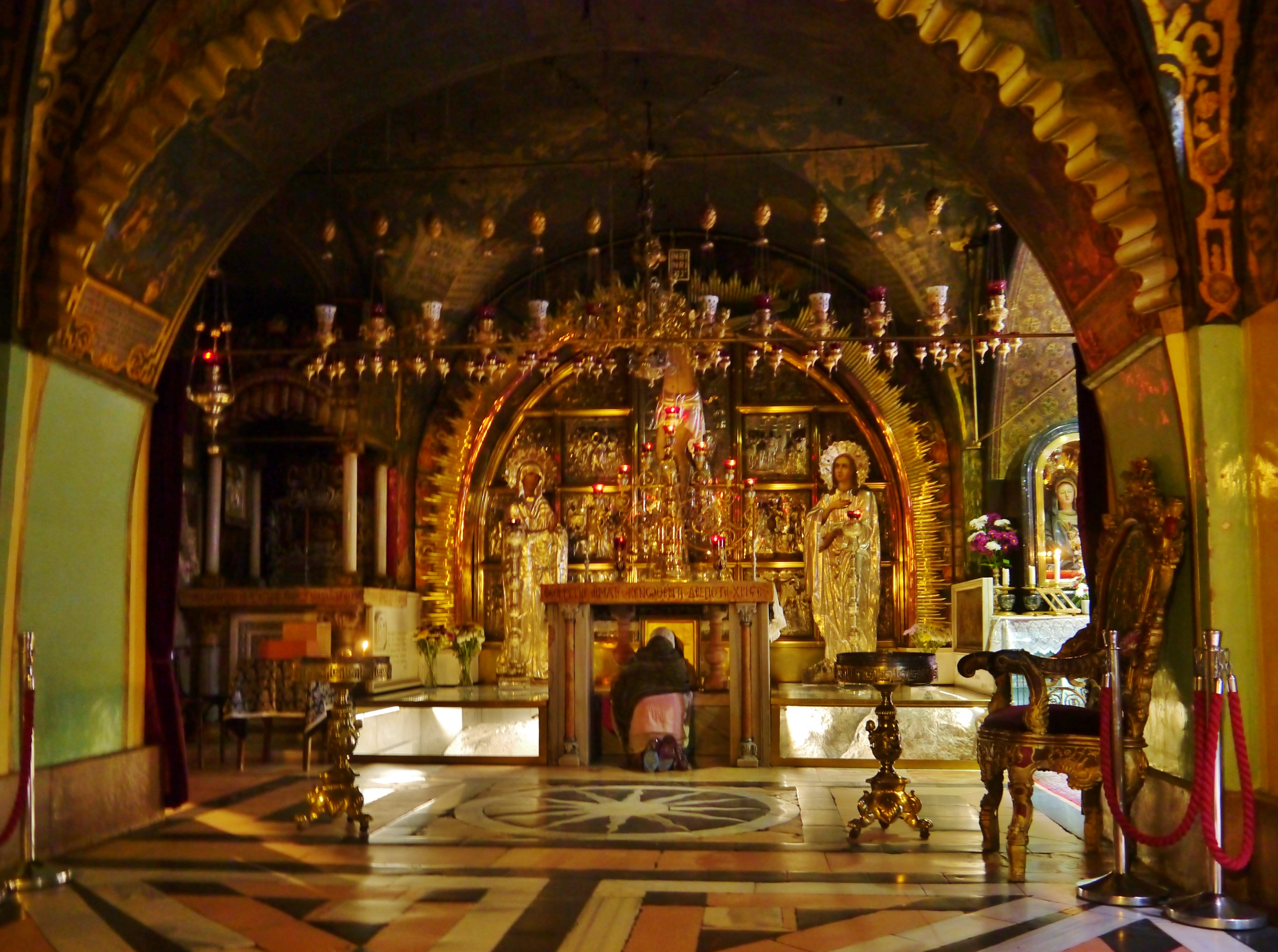
The Greek Altar of Calvary, Church of the Holy Sepulchre, Jerusalem

Many of the most prominent Orthodox Christian and Jewish interfaith officials, scholars and clerics held a three-day conference in Thessaloniki in June 2013 to discuss the crucial importance of protecting the environment and religious values and condemned events of anti-Semitism and religious prejudice around the world. The meeting had an aim to help improve even further relations between these two ancient faith communities. Ecumenical Patriarch Bartholomew has declared 2013 the Year of Global Solidarity, thus Metropolitan Emmanuel declared: "It is well documented that Greeks living in Thessaloniki at the time of the Shoah stood with their Jewish neighbors and friends. Today, more than ever, we must stand together to battle the evils of anti-Semitism, religious prejudice and all forms of discrimination.".

The presence of the Romaniote Jews in Greece and in modern Israel is historically important. The Romaniotes have used the Judaeo-Greek language for centuries in their Jewish prayer liturgy.

With the financial help of the Onassis Foundation a faculty for Byzantine and Modern Hellenic studies in the University of Haifa has been established, and many faculties for the study of the Ancient Greek Culture are spread around Israel. In 2015 a faculty for Judaic studies was opened in the Aristotle University of Thessaloniki with the financial help of the Jewish community of Thessaloniki.

=== Greek singers and Israel ===
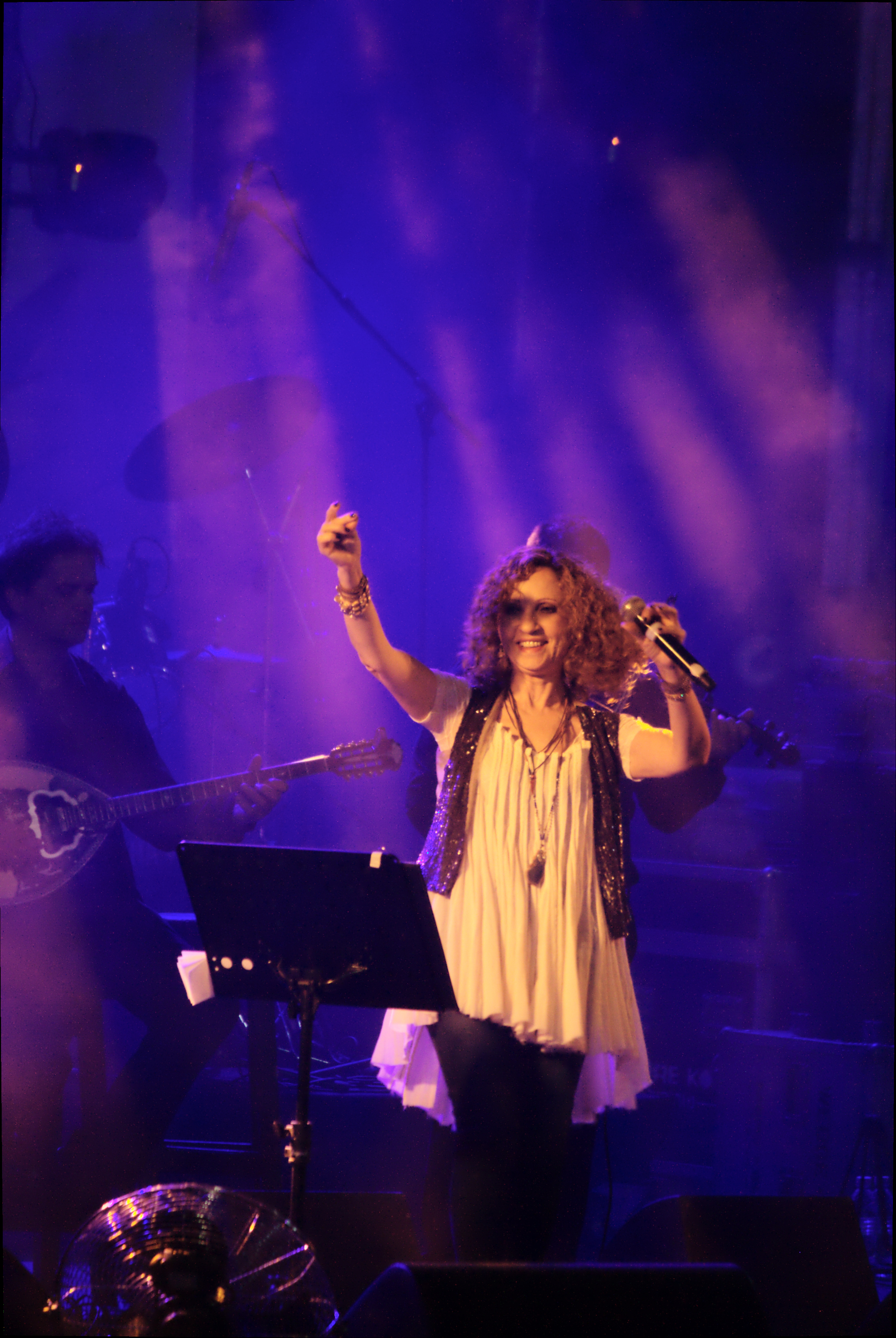
Glykeria during a concert held in Rishon LeZion, September 2013

Greek music is considered the most popular foreign genre in Israel after American and British music. Israel is the top destination for Greek music concerts alongside Germany, the United Kingdom and Cyprus. Popular Greek singers who have performed in Israel include Manolis Angelopoulos, Eleftheria Arvanitaki, George Dalaras, Haris Alexiou, Glykeria and Natassa Theodoridou. In December 2012 Natassa Theodoriou performed some of her songs in Tel Aviv Performing Arts Center in Hebrew. In 2007 during the interview of Shimon Peres by Hellenic Broadcasting Corporation on George Dalaras concert in Israel, President Peres stated: "In Israel we love the Greek music. For us Greece is a country but also a melody".

A special broadcasting day of Greek classical and modern music was organised on 12 June 2013 by the Israel Broadcasting Authority, in cooperation with the Embassy of Greece in Tel Aviv. The program started with an hourly show, presented by Ambassador Lampridis and the Director of the Radio Station Arie Yass with an emphasis on the roots and the historical evolution of modern Greek music. During the whole day, Kol Ha Musica broadcast works of modern Greek composers including Hatzidakis, Theodorakis, Spanoudakis, Remboutsika, Karaidrou, Mikroutsikos and Markopoulos. The programme also included Sephardi music from Thessaloniki and Rhodes.

The Israeli radio show Kol Shishi, hosted by Yaron Enosh, is almost completely dedicated to Greece and its culture, music, philosophy and history, and has an audience of approximately 800,000 Israeli listeners. In Israel there are 12 internet radio stations that broadcast exclusively Greek music.

== Official visits ==
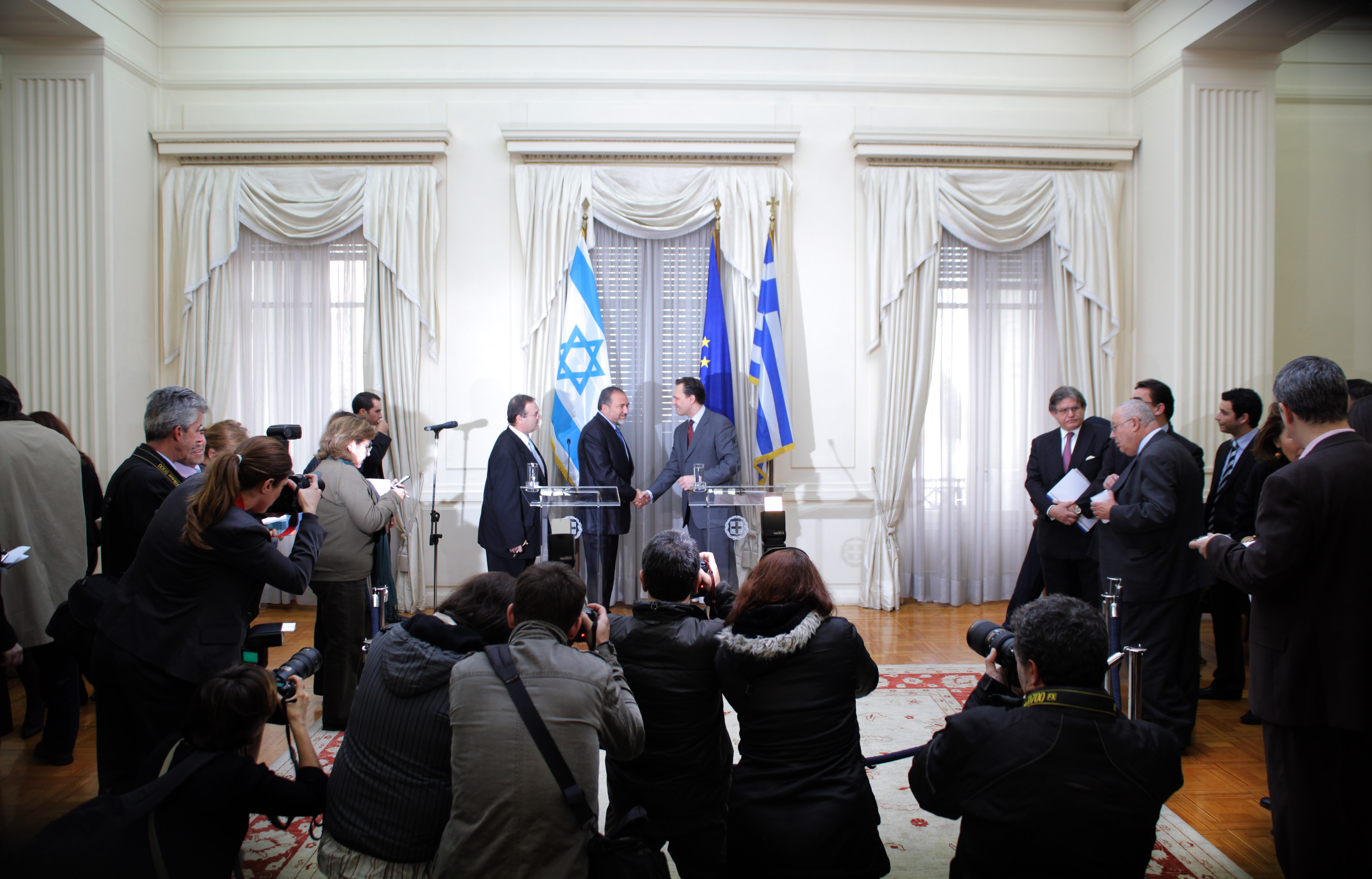
Greek Foreign Minister Dimitrios Droutsas meeting with Israeli Foreign Minister Avigdor Liberman in Athens, January 2011

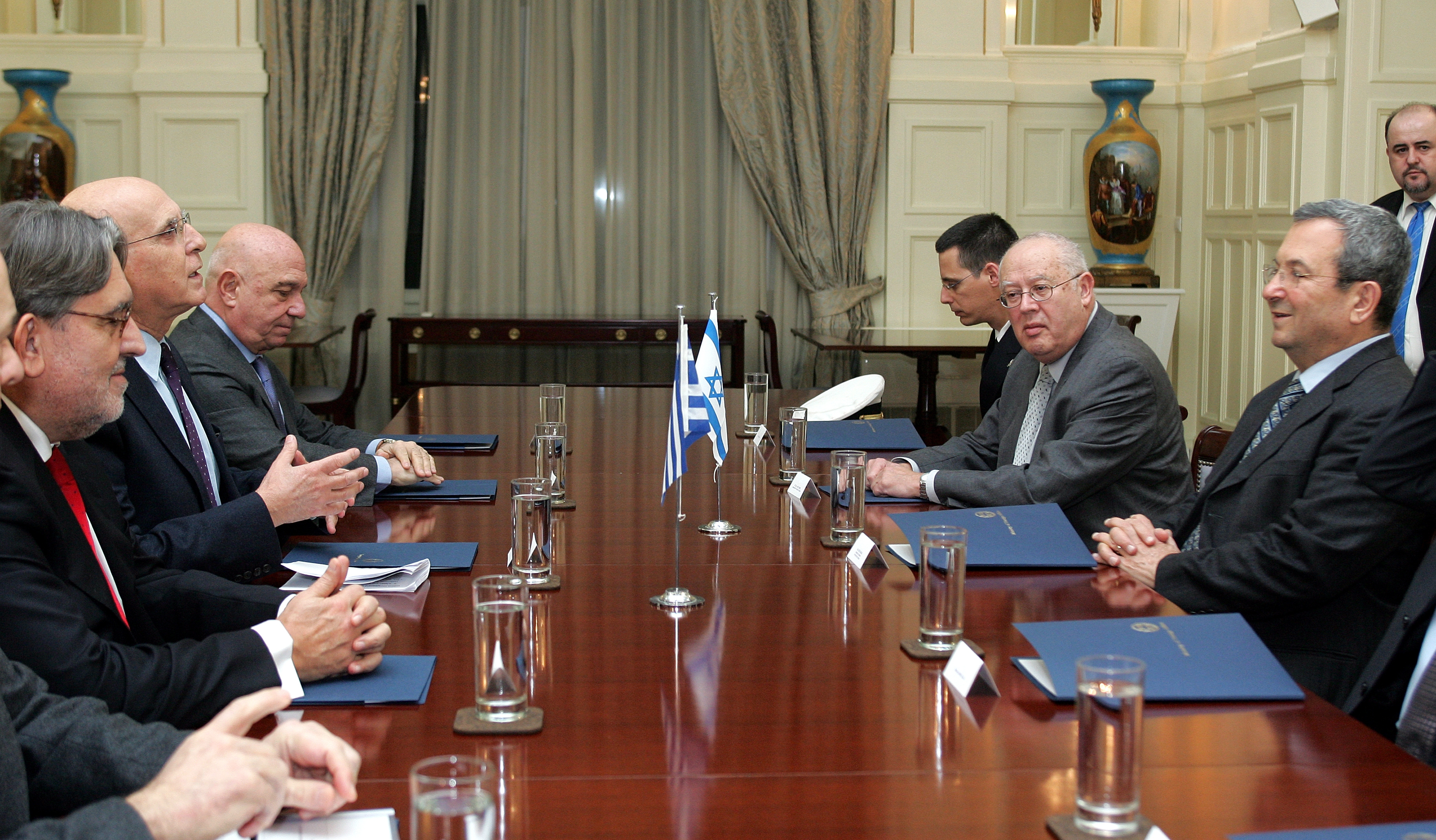
Greek Foreign Minister Stavros Dimas (l.) greets Israel Defense Minister Ehud Barak in Athens, 2012

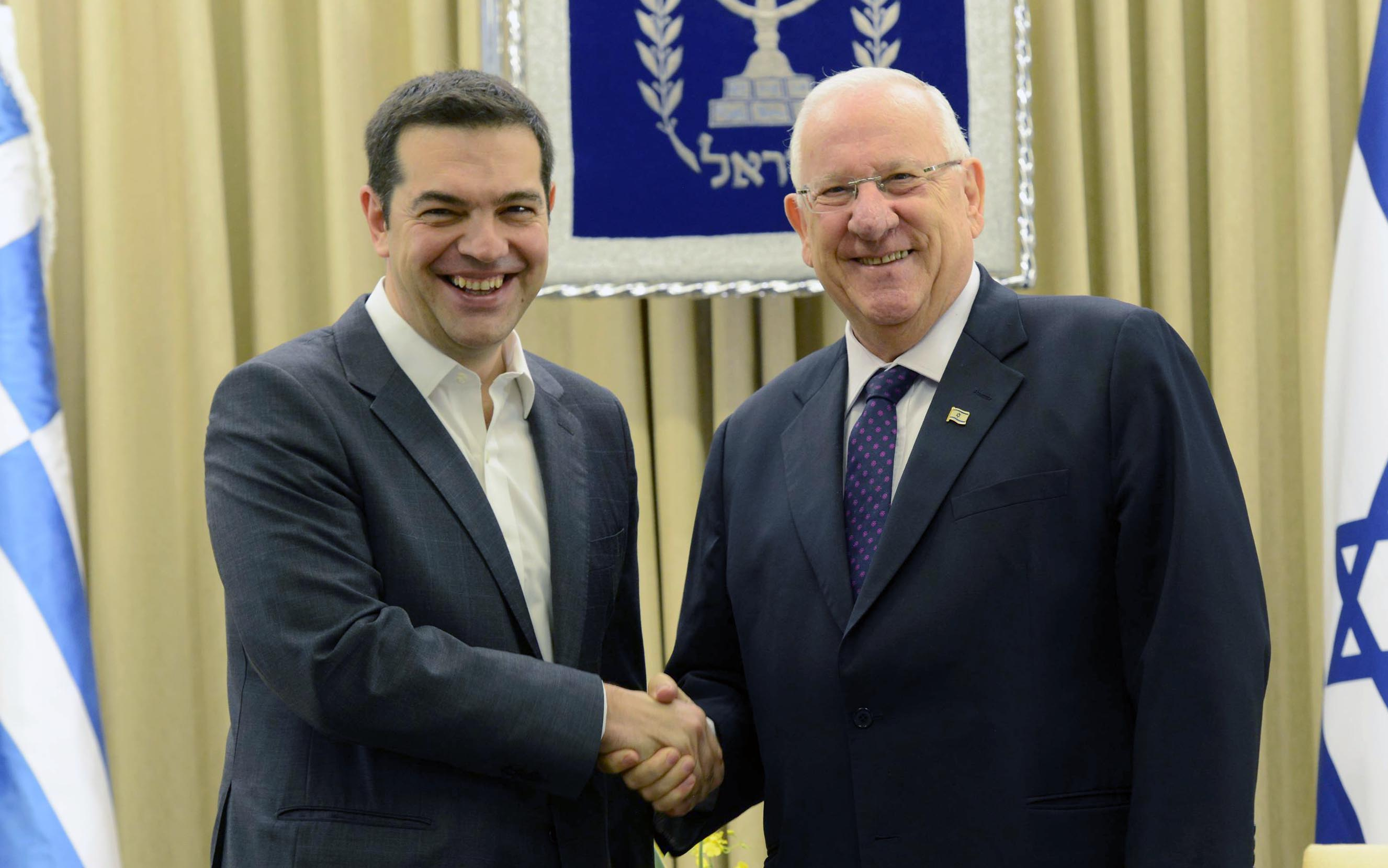
Greek Prime Minister Alexis Tsipras (l.) with President of Israel Reuven Rivlin in Israel, November 2015

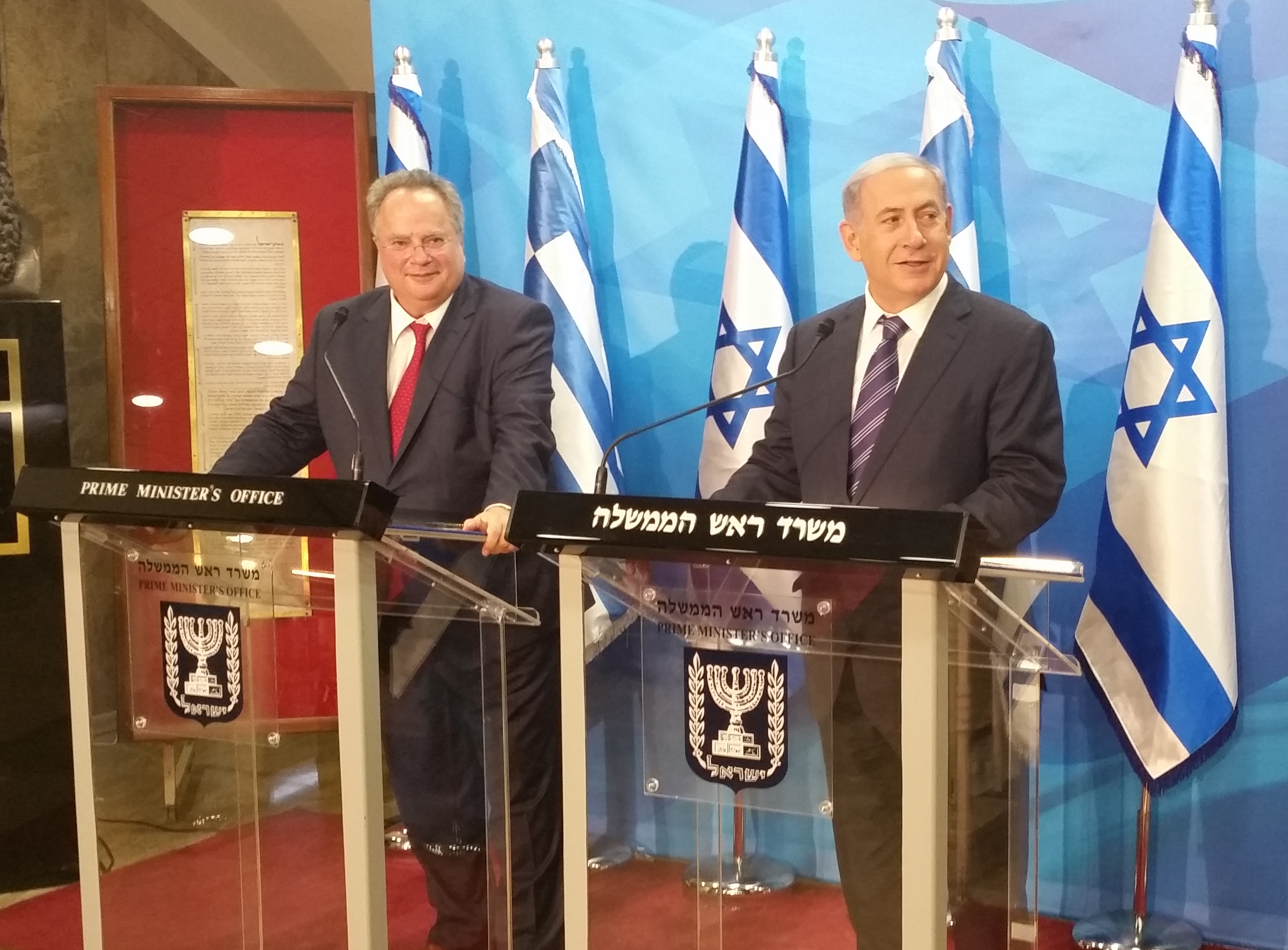
Working visit to Israel of Greek Foreign Minister Nikos Kotzias, here meeting (l.) with Israeli Prime Minister Benjamin Netanyahu, July 2015 in Jerusalem

During his October 2019 visit to Israel, Air chief marshal and Chief of the National Defense Forces' General Staff Christos Christodoulou (l.) is greeted by IDF Chief of the General Staff Lieutenant General Aviv Kochavi

Guest	Host	Place of visit	Date of visit
(Israel) Prime Minister Benjamin Netanyahu	(Greece) Prime Minister George Papandreou	Athens, Greece	August 2010
(Israel) Foreign Minister Avigdor Lieberman	(Greece) Foreign Minister Dimitris Droutsas	Athens, Greece	13–17 January 2011
(Greece) Energy Minister Giorgos Papakonstantinou	(Israel) Environmental Protection Minister Gilad Erdan	Tel Aviv, Israel	November 2011
(Israel) Defence Minister Ehud Barak	(Greece) Defence Minister Dimitris Avramopoulos	Attica, Greece	January 2012
(Greece) Prime Minister George Papandreou	(Israel) Prime Minister Benjamin Netanyahu, President Shimon Peres	Jerusalem, Israel	9–12 January 2012
(Greece) Deputy Foreign Minister Dimitris Dollis	(Israel) Deputy Foreign Minister Danny Ayalon	Jerusalem, Israel	28 February 2012
(Israel) President Shimon Peres	(Greece) President Karolos Papoulias, Prime Minister Antonis Samaras	Maximos Mansion, Athens	August 2012
(Greece) Minister of Tourism Olga Kefalogianni	(Israel) President Shimon Peres	Jerusalem, Israel	January 2013
(Greece) Foreign Minister Dimitris Avramopoulos	(Israel) Prime Minister Benjamin Netanyahu	Jerusalem, Israel	May 2013
(Greece) Prime Minister Antonis Samaras	(Israel) Prime Minister Benjamin Netanyahu	Jerusalem, Israel	October 2013
(Israel) Foreign Minister Avigdor Lieberman	(Greece) President Karolos Papoulias	Athens, Greece	March 2014
(Israel) Head of Israeli Navy Ram Rothberg	(Greece) Head of Greek Navy Evangelos Apostolakis	Athens, Greece	July 2014
(Greece) Foreign Minister Nikos Kotzias	(Israel) Prime Minister Benjamin Netanyahu	Jerusalem, Israel	July 2015
(Greece) Minister of Defense Panos Kammenos	(Israel) Minister of Defense Moshe Ya'alon	Jerusalem, Israel	July 2015
(Greece) Prime Minister Alexis Tsipras	(Israel) Prime Minister Benjamin Netanyahu	Jerusalem, Israel	November 2015
(Greece) President Prokopis Pavlopoulos	(Israel) President Reuven Rivlin	Jerusalem, Israel	March 2016
(Israel) Prime Minister Benjamin Netanyahu	(Greece) Prime Minister Alexis Tsipras	Thessaloniki, Greece	June 2017
(Israel) Prime Minister Benjamin Netanyahu	(Greece) Prime Minister Kyriakos Mitsotakis	Athens, Greece	January 2020
(Greece) Prime Minister Kyriakos Mitsotakis	(Israel) Prime Minister Benjamin Netanyahu	Jerusalem, Israel	June 2020
(Greece) Prime Minister Kyriakos Mitsotakis	(Israel) Prime Minister Naftali Bennett	Jerusalem, Israel	December 2021
(Israel) President Isaac Herzog	(Greece) Prime Minister Kyriakos Mitsotakis	Athens, Greece	February 2022
(Greece) Prime Minister Kyriakos Mitsotakis	(Israel) Prime Minister Benjamin Netanyahu	Israel	October 23, 2023

== Diplomatic missions ==
Since May 1991, diplomatic relations between the two countries have been upgraded from diplomatic representation to embassy level. Greece is represented in Israel through its embassy in Tel Aviv, its Consulate General in Jerusalem, and an honorary consulate in Haifa. Israel is represented in Greece through its embassy in Athens.

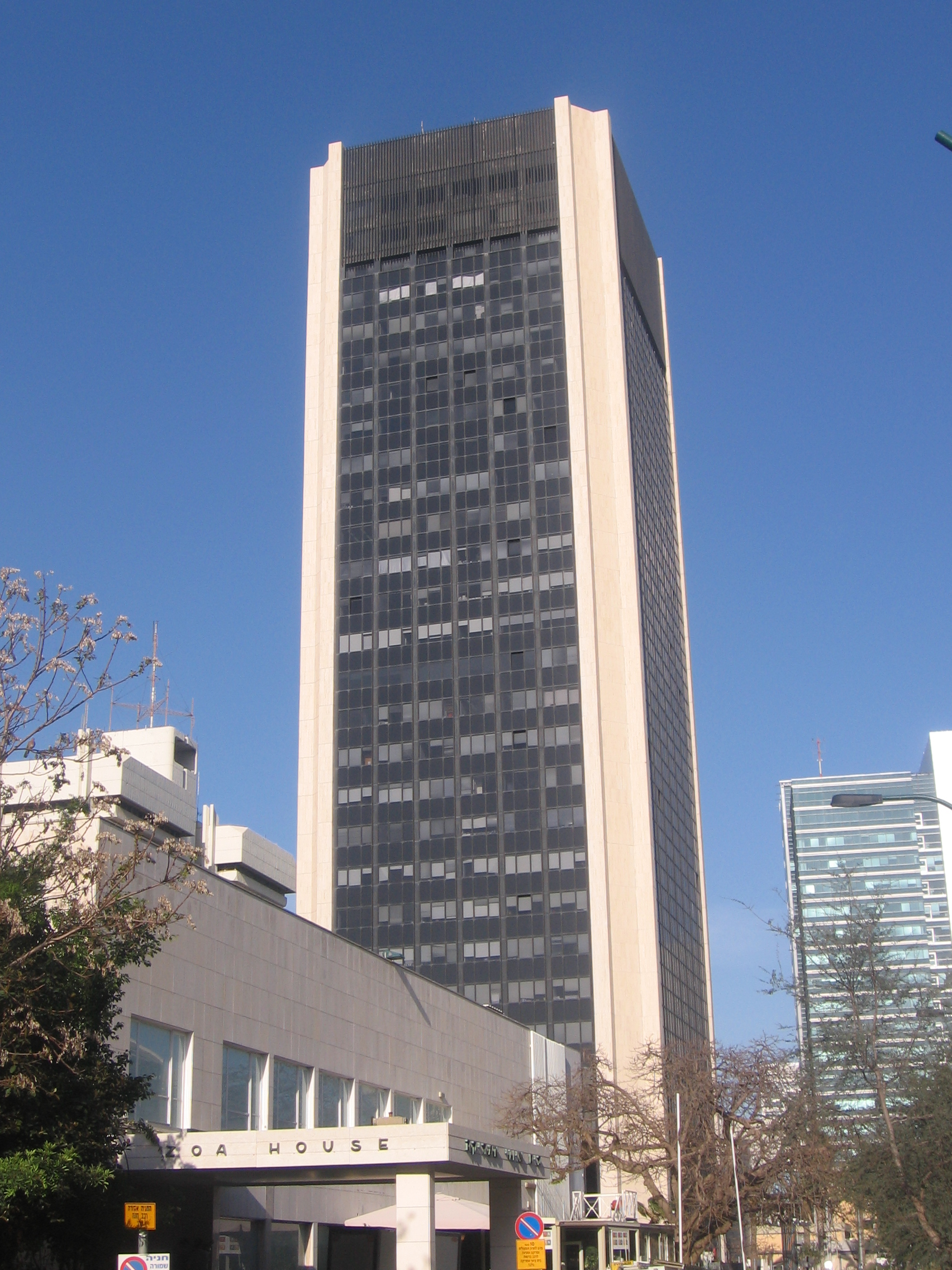
Embassy of Greece in Tel Aviv

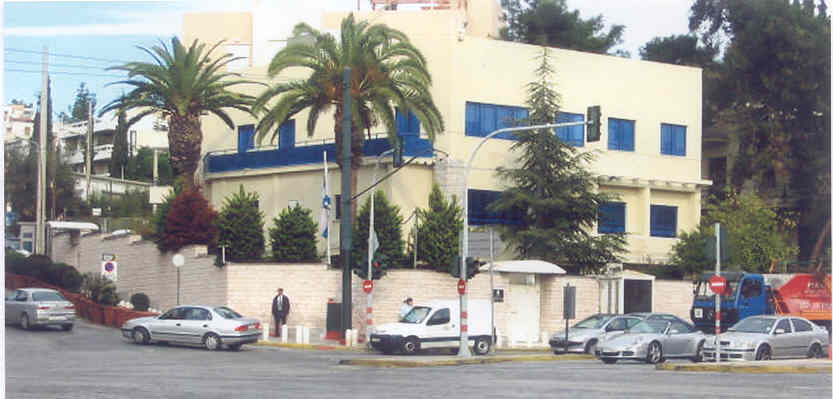
Embassy of Israel in Athens

=== List of ambassadors of Israel to Greece ===
- Noam Katz 2022 - 2026
- Yossi Amrani 2019 - 2022
- Irit Ben-Abba 2014 - 2019
- Arye Mekel 2010 - 2014
- Ali Yihye 2006 - 2010
- Ram Aviram 2003 - 2006
- David Sasson 2001 - 2003
- Ran Curiel 1996 - 2001
- David Sasson 1990 - 1996
- Moshe Gilboa 1986 - 1990
- Nissim Yaish 1976 - 1981
- Yehuda Gaulan 1970 - 1974
- Shmuel Kapel 1962
- Yehuda Horam 1956 - 1957

== See also ==
- Energy Triangle
- History of the Jews in Greece
- International recognition of Israel
- Greeks in Israel
- EuroAsia Interconnector
- Israel–Turkey relations
- Cyprus–Israel relations
- Greece–Palestine relations
