= American Jewish Committee =

U.S. Jewish advocacy group

- Formation: November 11, 1906; 120 years ago
- Type: Human rights, civil rights, pro-Israel, human relations
- Tax ID no.: 13-5563393
- Legal status: 501(c)(3) nonprofit organization
- Headquarters: New York City
- CEO: Ted Deutch
- President: Robert E. Lapin
- Key people: Avital Leibovich, Felice Gaer, Davis Harris
- Subsidiaries: Project Interchange; Muslim-Jewish Advisory Council; AJC Transatlantic Institute; AJC ACCESS
- Revenue: $126,680,875 (2024)
- Expenses: $102,290,971 (2024)
- Endowment: $174,051,649 (2024)
- Employees: 393 (2024)
- Volunteers: 1,175 (2024)
- Website: www.ajc.org

The American Jewish Committee (AJC) is an American Jewish civil rights and advocacy group established on November 11, 1906. The oldest Jewish defence organization and one of the oldest Jewish advocacy organizations in general, it was founded in response to the extensive pogroms then occurring in Russia and initially also advocated a liberal United States immigration policy. The New York Times has characterized it as "widely regarded as the dean of American Jewish organizations".

The AJC has consistently opposed antisemitism in the United States and internationally and has worked to protect the civil liberties of Jews. Since the Second World War, its concern with civil liberties has also extended to non-Jewish groups, and it has opposed broader forms of discrimination and promoted social equality in the United States. Among its activities in the civil rights movement, it filed an amicus curiae brief in the 1954 case Brown v. Board of Education and participated in other civil-rights initiatives. The American Jewish Relief Committee and other philanthropic organizations developed from the AJC, which has also sponsored numerous publications, including The American Jewish Year Book.

== Organization ==
American Jewish Committee (AJC) is an international advocacy organization whose key area of focus is to promote religious and civil rights for Jews and others.

AJC has 25 regional offices in the United States, 13 overseas offices, and 35 international partnerships with Jewish communal institutions around the world.

=== Programs and institutes ===
AJC Transatlantic Institute

- AJC's Jacob Blaustein Institute (JBI) for the Advancement of Human Rights, led by Felice Gaer from 1993 to 2024, is the only human rights division within a major Jewish organization. Under Gaer, the JBI expanded its focus to global universal rights, including women's rights, torture victims, and the protection of political dissidents.
- The AJC Transatlantic Institute, based in Brussels, was opened in February 2004 to promote ties between the transatlantic relationship between the United States and Europe.
- Alexander Young Leadership Department
  - ACCESS, AJC's young professional program
- Arthur and Rochelle Belfer Institute for Latino and Latin American Affairs
- Asia Pacific Institute
- Combating Antisemitism in Washington, D.C.
- Heilbrunn Institute for International Interreligious Understanding in Jerusalem
- Information Center and Digital Archives
- Interreligious and Intergroup Relations
- Jacob Blaustein Institute for the Advancement of Human Rights in New York
- Jewish Religious Equality Coalition (JREC) in Jerusalem
- Lawrence and Lee Ramer Institute for German-Jewish Relations in Berlin
- Muslim-Jewish Advisory Council
- Project Interchange
- Policy and Political Affairs in Washington, D.C.
- Shapiro Silverberg AJC Central Europe in Warsaw
- Sidney Lerner Center for Arab-Jewish Understanding in Abu Dhabi
- William Petschek Contemporary Jewish Life

== History ==
=== 1900–1929 ===
On November 11, 1906, 81 American Jews of Central European background met in the Hotel Savoy in New York City to establish the American Jewish Committee. The impetus for the group's formation was to eliminate the barriers to full Jewish participation in American life. More broadly, AJC sought to protect the rights of Jews all over the world and to combat anti-Jewish discrimination and antisemitism.

In its early years, the AJC worked quietly, utilizing the contacts of its most financially successful members, who were mostly Reform Jews. Early leaders included lawyer Louis Marshall, banker Jacob H. Schiff, Judge Mayer Sulzberger, scholar Cyrus Adler, and other politically connected Jews.

Marshall was AJC's president from 1912 until his death in 1929. While president, Marshall is credited with making the AJC a leading voice in the 1920s against immigration restrictions. Additionally, he succeeded in forcing Henry Ford to cease publication and distribution of his antisemitic newspaper The Dearborn Independent. Ford was also made to apologize publicly and pay a cash settlement.

In 1914, the AJC helped create the American Jewish Joint Distribution Committee, established to aid Jewish victims of World War I.

In the 1920s, AJC fought virulent antisemitism and pogroms in Romania, as well as discrimination against Russian Jewish refugees in Turkey, and Jews in Yemen. The AJC also filed complaints with the Council of the League of Nations after Norway passed a law banning schechita, Jewish ritual slaughter by butchers. After the 1929 Palestine riots, AJC asked the U.S. government to ensure the British government protected the Jews in Mandatory Palestine.

In the late 1920s, AJC advocated for reform of the Immigration Act of 1924, including repeal of the National Origins Formula that effectively made immigration from Eastern Europe, where the vast majority of the Jewish diaspora lived at the time, impossible.

After Marshall's death, Cyrus Adler was unanimously elected AJC's president at the organization's annual meeting in November 1929.

=== 1930s and 1940s ===
The AJC advocated finding places of refuge for Jewish refugees from Adolf Hitler in the 1930s, but had minimal success. After World War II broke out in 1939, the AJC stressed that the war was for democracy and discouraged emphasis on Hitler's anti-Jewish policies lest a backlash identify it as a "Jewish war" and increase antisemitism in the United States. When the war ended in 1945, it urged a human rights program upon the United Nations and proved vital in enlisting the support that made possible the human rights provisions in the UN Charter.

During the interwar period, AJC was the most powerful Jewish organization in the United States. The group was decidedly non-Zionist not in principle against the State of Israel, but in opposition to Jewish nationalism being the raison d'etre of American Jews. The group faced a crisis in the 1940s due to its president Joseph Proskauer's opposition to Zionism, and AJC left the umbrella group American Jewish Conference due to its position, even though that organization was making efforts to save Jews from the Holocaust.

The AJC "worked to contain nativist sentiment in America rather than work to open America's doors to refugees" during the Holocaust. For fear of provoking an increase in antisemitic sentiment, the AJC opposed public activism. They have been widely criticized for their inaction during the Holocaust; historian and AJC National Director of Jewish Communal Affairs Steven Bayme said AJC leaders "never understood the uniqueness of Nazism and its 'war against the Jews'." This cautious approach changed after the war, when the AJC began openly lobbying for a new immigration law allowing entrance to the United States for displaced persons from Europe. This law also led to Nazi collaborators entering the United States, though it remains unclear whether a more restrictive policy would have avoided this outcome.

=== Post World War II ===
After World War II, AJC changed its stance on the State of Israel. In 1950, AJC President Jacob Blaustein reached an agreement with Israeli prime minister David Ben-Gurion stating that the political allegiance of American Jews was solely to their country of residence. By the Six-Day War of 1967, the AJC had become a passionate defender of the Jewish state, shedding old inhibitions to espouse the centrality of Jewish peoplehood.

The organization worked successfully to include a human rights provision in the UN Charter.

=== Anti-Communism ===
The Rosenberg Case severely alarmed the AJC and other Jewish organizations, and the AJC supported the Rosenbergs' execution. Writing from Sing Sing, Julius Rosenberg charged that "self-appointed leaders of Jewish organizations" were behaving like an "American Judenrat", accusing the AJC's Solomon Andhil Fineberg of spreading a false rumor that the Rosenbergs believed they were being prosecuted because they were Jewish.

During the Second Red Scare, the AJC sent a representative to testify before the House Un-American Activities Committee, emphasizing that "Judaism and Communism are utterly incompatible." The AJC shared files with HUAC and also employed a staff member to investigate alleged Communist infiltration among the Jewish community. At the organization's conference in October 1950, the executive committee adopted a resolution stating that the protection and advancement of civil liberties and civil rights could not be accomplished with combatting communism in the United States. AJC chairman Irving M. Engel said that "loyalty to the fundamental basis of Judaism requires all Jews to stand with the vanguard in the struggle against totalitarianism. Our attitude as Americans...should be positive and vigorous against communism. Let all of us lead the attack against this common foe of America."

=== Civil Rights Movement ===
As part of broader Jewish involvement in the Civil Rights Movement, AJC took the position that the rights of Jews in the United States could be best protected by pursuing equality of all Americans. AJC commissioned the social science research of black psychologist Kenneth Clark, which demonstrated how segregation affected black children. AJC cited Clark's research in its amicus curiae brief in support of Oliver Brown during the 1954 U.S. Supreme Court case Brown v. Board of Education. The court cited Clark's research in its decision establishing racial segregation in public schools were unconstitutional.

AJC, along with the ADL and American Jewish Congress, believed that racial quotas were unconstitutional, and Jewish groups opposed their use in determining admission in higher education in the United States. For this reason, AJC celebrated the landmark 1978 U.S. Supreme Court decision in Regents of the University of California v. Bakke that struck down racial quotas in university admissions. Despite the Bakke decision, AJC supported affirmative action programs for disadvantaged groups. By 2003, the organization's opposition to affirmative action had tempered. The AJC's director of public policy Jeffrey Sinesky said that "It's the quota concept that's anathema" after the organization submitted a brief in defense of the University of Michigan's affirmative action program.

According to the New York Times, the AJC had taken a leading role in the struggle for equal rights for African Americans in the United States by the early 1990s.

=== 1960s and 1970s ===
Through direct dialogue with the Catholic Church, the AJC played a leading role in improving Jewish-Christian relations, leading the Vatican to issue the Nostra aetate in 1965, absolving Jews of collective responsibility for the death of Jesus. American Jewish Committee, along with the Synagogue Council of America, and the American Ethical Union each submitted briefs in Engel v. Vitale urging the US Supreme Court to rule that the public school prayer was unconstitutional.

Before the Six-Day War in 1967, the AJC was officially "non-Zionist". It had long been ambivalent about Zionism as possibly opening up Jews to the charge of dual loyalty, but it supported the creation of Israel in 1947–48, after the United States backed the partition of Palestine. It was the first American Jewish organization to open a permanent office in Israel.

In the 1970s, the AJC spearheaded the fight to pass anti-boycott legislation to counter the Arab League boycott of Israel. In particular, Japan's defection from the boycott was attributed to AJC persuasion. In 1975, the AJC became the first Jewish organization to campaign against the UN's "Zionism is Racism" Resolution 3379, when briefly integrated to President's Conference in order to join the touristic boycott against Mexico, after the World Conference on Women, 1975, the event in which Arab countries, the Soviet bloc, and Non-Aligned Movement countries impulsed the initial discussion that resulted in Resolution 3379. Along with other American Jewish organizations, the AJC announced the suspension of all their trips to Mexico as an expression of "the wish of some Jews and Jewish organizations to boycott Mexico". They did this is spite of their anti-boycott tradition. Finally, the campaign against Resolution 3379 succeeded in 1991, as it was revoked through Resolution 4686. AJC played a leading role in breaking Israel's diplomatic isolation at the UN by helping it gain acceptance in WEOG (West Europe and Others), one of the UN's five regional groups.

The AJC was active in the campaign to gain emigration rights for Jews living in the Soviet Union; in 1964 it was one of the founders of the American Jewish Conference on Soviet Jewry, which in 1971 was superseded by the National Conference on Soviet Jewry.

=== 1980s and 1990s ===
Founded in 1982, Project Interchange became part of the AJC in 1992; it runs seminars in Israel for influential Americans and global leaders.

In December 1987, the AJC's Washington representative, David Harris, organized the Freedom Sunday Rally on behalf of Soviet Jewry. Approximately 250,000 people attended the D.C. rally, which demanded that the Soviet government allow Jewish emigration from the USSR. In 1990, David Harris become executive director. Under his leadership, the AJC became increasingly involved in international affairs. Regular meetings with foreign diplomats both in the United States and in their home countries were supplemented each September by what came to be called a "diplomatic marathon", a series of meetings with high-level representatives of foreign countries who were in New York for the UN General Assembly session.

In 1990, the AJC conducted a major restructuring, laying off 40 of its 275 staff and cutting $1 million from its $16 million annual budget, in order to focus its work on intergroup relations. The organization ended its activities in Western Europe and South America and merged its offices in New York and Washington. According to Rabbi Arthur Hertzberg, the AJC had been challenged by more aggressive groups. The ADL and Simon Wiesenthal Center had taken a more strident position on the antisemitism issue, while the American Jewish Congress had attracted liberals with its willingness to criticize the policies of Israeli prime minister Yitzhak Shamir.

In 1998, the AJC established a full-time presence in Germany—the first American Jewish organization to do so—opening an office in Berlin.

In 1999, the AJC ran an ad campaign in support of NATO's intervention in Kosovo.

=== 2000s ===
In 2000, the AJC helped establish the Atlanta Jewish Film Festival in Atlanta, Georgia, the largest Jewish film festival in the world.

In 2001, the AJC became official partners with the Geneva-based UN Watch.

In 2005, as part of its continuing efforts to respond to humanitarian crises, the organization contributed US$2.5 million to relief funds and reconstruction projects for the victims of the South Asian tsunami and Hurricane Katrina in the US.

By its 100th anniversary in 2006, AJC had 33 chapters in the United States and a presence in 20 countries. Organization leaders marked the occasion with a multi-country tour across Europe and the Middle East. Nearly 2,000 people gathered in Washington, D.C., to celebrate its 100th Annual Meeting that May, and President George W. Bush, U.N. Secretary General Kofi Annan, and German chancellor Angela Merkel attended a reception in its honor. These individuals gave credit to American Jewish Committee for protecting Jewish Security and human rights around the world.

AJC became increasingly involved in the advocacy of energy independence for the U.S. on the grounds that this would reduce dependence on foreign, especially Arab, oil; boost the American economy; and improve the environment. AJC urged Congress and several presidential administrations to take action toward this goal, and called upon the private sector to be more energy-conscious. It adopted "Green" policies for itself institutionally, and in 2011 earned LEED certification, denoting that its New York headquarters was energy efficient and environmentally sound.

As part of a new strategic plan adopted in 2009, the AJC said it envisioned itself as the "Global Center for Jewish and Israel Advocacy" and the "Central 'Jewish Address' for Intergroup Relations and Human Rights". Its new tagline was "Global Jewish Advocacy".

=== 2010s ===
AJC diplomatic efforts since 2010 include opposition to Iran's program to attain nuclear capability; a campaign to get the European Union to designate Hezbollah a terrorist organization; preserving the right of Jews to practice circumcision in Germany; and urging the government of Greece to take action against the neo-Nazi Golden Dawn party.

In October 2011, the AJC issued a joint statement with the Anti-Defamation League urging American Jews to support a Joint Unity Pledge stating: "America's friendship with Israel is an emotional, moral and strategic bond that has always transcended politics." It urged that "now is the time to reaffirm that Israel's well-being is best served, as it always has been, by American voices raised together in unshakeable support for our friend and ally."

The statement aroused a storm of protest from Jewish opponents of President Obama's re-election, who perceived it as a call to avoid criticizing the president's policies toward Israel. In the pages of the Wall Street Journal, former Under Secretary of Defense Douglas Feith asked: "Since when have American supporters of Israel believed that a candidate's attitudes toward Israel should be kept out of electoral politics? Since never." David Harris responded that the statement was intended to preserve the tradition of bipartisan support for Israel and prevent it from becoming "a dangerous political football". While Harris recognized the right of anyone in the Jewish community to take a partisan position, he stressed the need for "strong advocacy in both parties" at a time of looming international difficulties for the Jewish state.

Along with other agencies such as the Simon Wiesenthal Center and the Union for Reform Judaism, the AJC condemned a move in mid-2014 by the U.S. Presbyterian Church to divest from companies that do business with Israel settlements. An AJC statement asserted that the divestment is just one incident of the U.S. church group "demonizing Israel", referring to "one-sided reports and study guides, such as Zionism Unsettled" as proof of anti-Zionist sentiments. In 2016, the AJC and Islamic Society of North America formed the Muslim-Jewish Advisory Council to address rising bigotry against Jews and Muslims in the United States.

On 22 February 2019, the AJC condemned the Otzma Yehudit party, calling its views "reprehensible". The AJC statement said Otzma Yehudit's views "do not reflect the core values that are the very foundation of the State of Israel." The AJC statement came after the Bayit Yehudi party merged with Otzma Yehudit and the new joint slate appeared likely to win enough votes to earn seats in the next Knesset as well as ministerial roles for some of its members. No members of Otzma Yehudit were elected.

=== 2020s ===
In early 2022, the AJC released its fourth annual "State of Antisemitism in America" report and later that year the organization announced its "Call to Action on Antisemitism" playbook. After a string of high-profile antisemitic incidents, including comments made by Kanye West, the organization participated in a White House round-table on antisemitism with Second Gentleman Doug Emhoff.

After more than thirty years as CEO, David Harris retired in 2022 and was replaced by South Florida congressman Ted Deutch.

On February 10, 2023, CEO Ted Deutch joined Emhoff, UN Undersecretary General Melissa Fleming, U.S. Ambassador to the U.N. Linda Thomas-Greenfield, and Ambassador Deborah Lipstadt on a panel about antisemitism.

In December 2024, the organization published a statement claiming that genocide was not occurring in Gaza and that Amnesty International's widely criticized report was an antisemitic attempt at isolating and delegitimizing the state of Israel.

== Muslim-Jewish relations ==
In January 2020, AJC and the Mecca-based Muslim World League led a "groundbreaking" joint delegation of Muslims and Jews to commemorate the 75th anniversary of the liberation of Auschwitz concentration camp. The trip was the most senior Islamic delegation to ever visit Auschwitz. As a part of the visit, AJC CEO David Harris and MWL Secretary-General Muhammad bin Abdul Karim Issa published a joint op-ed in the Chicago Tribune on how the delegation united Muslims and Jews.

ACCESS, AJC's young professional wing, and the Mimouna Association, an organization of young Muslim leaders in Morocco, have partnered since 2014 on joint missions to Israel and Morocco, conferences and programming on Jewish heritage in Morocco, and content highlighting commonalities between Jews and Arabs. Sarah Milgrim, killed in the 2025 Capital Jewish Museum shooting, participated in an AJC-Mimouna delegation to Morocco.

=== Abraham Accords ===
Under CEO David Harris, AJC pioneered quiet diplomacy in the Arab world before the Abraham Accords.

In June 2021, AJC opened an office in Abu Dhabi, its first office in an Arab country and its 13th office outside the United States to build on the Abraham Accords. The office's inaugural leader was Marc Sievers, former U.S. ambassador to Oman.

AJC partnered with TV Abraham, launched by Moroccan publisher and media executive Ahmed Charai, in April 2025 to produce content about diplomacy and shared values.

In September 2026, former Canadian ambassador to the United Arab Emirates Marcy Grossman succeeded Sievers as director of the Abu Dhabi office, formally known as the Sidney Lerner Center for Arab-Jewish Understanding. Grossman said the center would continue to focus on Arab-Israeli integration, economic diplomacy and engagement with civil society and religious organizations.

== Influence and reputation ==
AJC is the oldest Jewish defense and community relations organization in the United States, and is widely regarded as the dean of American Jewish organizations. According to historian Jonathan Sarna, AJC is known for its deep research of issues and working behind the scenes with high-level international contacts.

== Publications ==
=== Library ===
In 1930, the AJC founded a library at its Manhattan headquarters as a resource for its staff to research and write reports. According to historian Jonathan Sarna, the AJC's library was for the Jewish community what the Library of Congress was for the U.S. Congress At its peak, the library held 13,000 titles such as internal memos and reports on Jewish organizations, publications on race, religion, civil rights, and the Holocaust. In September 2012, the AJC shut down the library, with holdings going to Yeshiva University, Hebrew Union College – Jewish Institute of Religion, the Jewish Theological Seminary, Berman Jewish Policy Archive, and the Seminario Rabínico Latinoamericano.

=== Magazines ===
The AJC published the liberal magazine Present Tense from 1973 until 1990, when AJC ceased publication as part of an organizational reorganization. Murray Polner was the magazine's first and only editor. Present Tense often published articles critical of Israel and the American Jewish establishment. The organization also published the conservative magazine Commentary from 1945 until 2007.

=== New antisemitism ===
A 2007 essay, "Progressive Jewish Thought and the New Anti-Semitism" by professor Alvin H. Rosenfeld, published on the AJC website, criticized Jewish critics of Israel by name, particularly the editors and contributors to Wrestling With Zion: Progressive Jewish-American Responses to the Israeli-Palestinian Conflict (Grove Press), a 2003 collection of essays edited by Tony Kushner and Alisa Solomon. The essay accused these writers of participating in an "onslaught against Zionism and the Jewish State", which he considered a veiled form of supporting a rise in antisemitism.

In an editorial, the Jewish newspaper The Forward called Rosenfeld's essay "a shocking tissue of slander" whose intent was to "turn Jews against liberalism and silence critics." Richard Cohen remarked that the essay "has given license to the most intolerant and narrow-minded of Israel's defenders so that, as the AJC concedes in my case, any veering from orthodoxy is met with censure ... the most powerful of all post-Holocaust condemnations—anti-Semite—is diluted beyond recognition."

The essay was also criticized by Rabbi Michael Lerner and in op-eds in the Guardian and the Boston Globe.

In a Jerusalem Post op-ed, AJC Executive Director David Harris explained why the organization published Rosenfeld's essay in 2007:

Rosenfeld has courageously taken on the threat that arises when a Jewish imprimatur is given to the campaign to challenge Israel's very legitimacy. He has the right to express his views no less than those whom he challenges. It is important to stress that he has not suggested that those about whom he writes are anti-Semitic, though that straw-man argument is being invoked by some as a diversionary tactic. As befits a highly regarded and prolific scholar, he has written a well-documented and thought-provoking essay that deserves to be considered on its merits.

== Notable people ==
=== Presidents ===
- Mayer Sulzberger (1906–1912), also co-founder
- Louis B. Marshall (1912–1929), also co-founder
- Cyrus Adler (1929–1940), also co-founder
- Sol M. Stroock (1941)
- Maurice Wertheim (1941–1943)
- Joseph M. Proskauer (1943–1949), also co-founder
- Jacob Blaustein (1949–1954)
- Irving M. Engel (1954–1959)
- Herbert B. Ehrmann (1959–1961)
- Frederick F. Greenman (1961)
- Louis Caplan (1961–1962)
- A. M. Sonnabend (1962–1964)
- Morris B. Abram (1964–1968)
- Arthur J. Goldberg (1968–1969)
- Philip E. Hoffman (1969–1973)
- Elmer L. Winter (1973–1977)
- Richard Maass (1977–1980)
- Maynard I. Wishner (1980–1983)
- Howard I. Friedman (1983–1986)
- Theodore Ellenoff (1986–1989)
- Sholom D. Comay (1986–1991)
- Alfred H. Moses (1991–1994)
- Robert S. Rifkind (1995–1998)
- Bruce M. Ramer (1998–2001)
- Harold Tanner (2001–2004)
- E. Robert Goodkind (2004–2007)
- Richard Sideman (2007–2010)
- Robert Elman (2010–2013)
- Stanley M. Bergman (2013–2016)
- John Shapiro (2016–2019)
- Harriet Schleifer (2019–2022)
- Michael L. Tichnor (2022–2025)
- Robert E. Lapin (2025–present)

=== Other key people ===
- Steven Bayme, former director of Jewish Communal Affairs
- Elliot E. Cohen, former editor-in-chief of Commentary
- Harry Fleischman (1914–2004), Director of the National Labor Service between 1953 and 1979
- Ralph Friedman (1903/4–1992), former chairman
- Felice D. Gaer, Director of AJC's Jacob Blaustein Institute for the Advancement of Human Rights
- Jerry Goodman, former director for European affairs
- David Harris, executive director (1990–2022)
- Avital Leibovich, Director of AJC in Israel
- Samuel D. Leidesdorf, former board member and AJC Herbert H. Lehman Human Relations Award recipient
- Norman Podhoretz, former editor-in-chief of Commentary
- A. James Rudin, former director of Interreligious Affairs
- Dov Zakheim, former chair of Jewish Religious Equality Coalition (JREC)
- Jacob H. Schiff, co-founder
- Marc H. Tanenbaum, Director of Interreligious Affairs and later Director of International Affairs
- Max Horkheimer, German sociologist and director of the Institute for Social Research, assumed the directorship of the Scientific Division of the AJC in 1944.

== See also ==
- American Jews
- American Jewish Congress
