= Felice D. Gaer =

American activist (1946–2024)

Felice Gaer
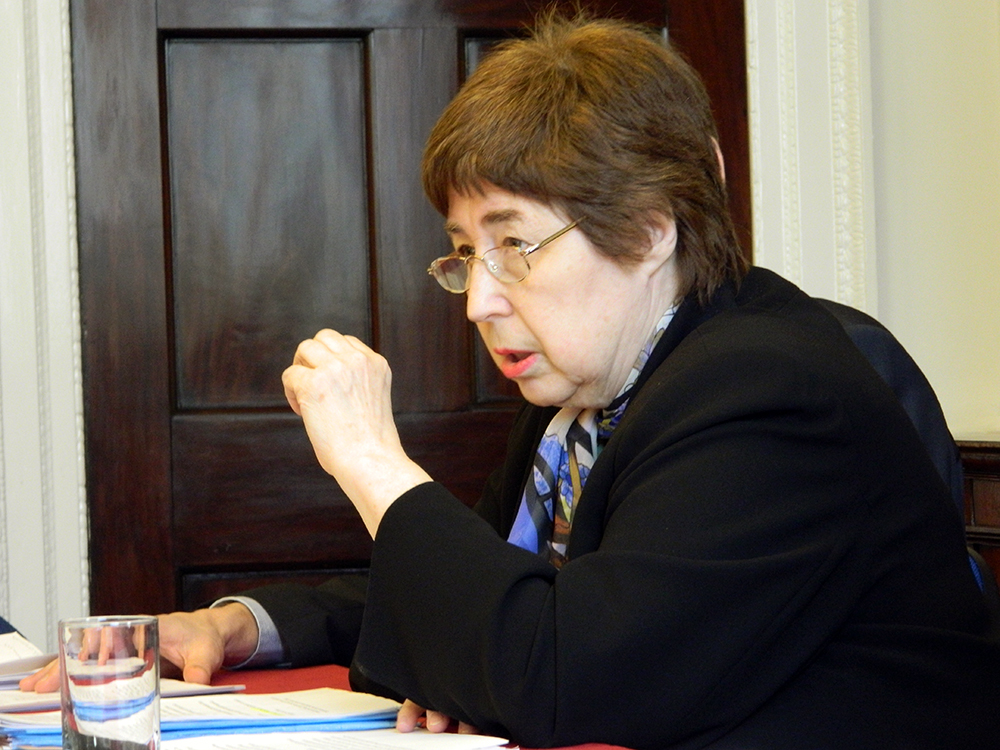
- Gaer in 2013

Personal details
- Born: June 16, 1946 Englewood, New Jersey, U.S.
- Died: November 9, 2024 (aged 78) New York, New York, U.S.
- Education: Wellesley College (BA); Columbia University (MA, MPhil)

Felice Diane Gaer (June 16, 1946 – November 9, 2024) was an American human rights defender and advocate. She worked on human rights matters and was a longstanding member and the former chair of the United States Commission on International Religious Freedom. She was a member of the US National Commission to UNESCO.

Gaer directed the Jacob Blaustein Institute for the Advancement of Human Rights of the American Jewish Committee, which conducts research and advocacy to strengthen international human rights. Gaer served on the United States Commission on International Religious Freedom from 2001 to 2012, having been nominated by the Clinton administration and renominated by the Bush administration and Obama administration, and later by Speaker of the House Nancy Pelosi.

Gaer was the first American to serve as an Independent Expert on the United Nations Committee Against Torture. There, she had been Vice Chair. Gaer was also a member of the Council on Foreign Relations.

== Early life and education ==
Gaer was born in Englewood, New Jersey, on June 16, 1946. She graduated Wellesley College with an A.B. in Political Science (1968). From Columbia University, she received a Master of Arts degree in 1971 and a Master of Philosophy degree in Political Science in 1975.

== Career ==
Gaer's career has involved human rights both nationally and internationally, working in different committees and commissions.

=== United Nations ===
From 2000, she was an independent expert on the UN Committee Against Torture. She became the committee's vice-chair in 2009. Furthermore, she was a rapporteur on Gender on the same committee from 2001 to 2006; and follow-up rapporteur on country compliance from 2003 to 2014.

=== United States ===
Gaer was a public member and/or public advisor of different US delegations:

- United Nations World Conference on Human Rights, Vienna (June 1993)
- United Nations World Conference on Women, Beijing (September 1995)
- Preparatory Conference, World Conference on Human Settlements (February 1996)
- United Nations Commission on Human Rights (2003–2006)

She was a commissioner of the United States Commission on International Religious Freedom (2001–2012). During that period she served as the commission's chair (2002-2003), then vice-chair (2003-2006), then chair again (2006-2009).

Gaer became a term member of the Council on Foreign Relations from 1976 until 1981 and later she became a life member (1991). She was a commissioner of the US National Commission to UNESCO from 2012.

She served on many other committees, associations and councils, including:

- President of the International Friends of the Chilean Human Rights Commission (1985–1990)
- International League for Human Rights, Board of Governors (1991–2005)
- The Carter Center, Emory University, International Human Rights Council (1994–2003)
- Human Rights Watch, Advisory Committee of the Europe and Central Asia Division (1996–2024)
- Chair of the National Coalition for the 50th Anniversary of the Universal Declaration of Human Rights, Steering Committee (1997–1999)
- Franklin and Eleanor Roosevelt Institute, Board of Directors (2001–2004) and Board of Governors (2001–2004)
- Eleanor Roosevelt Center at Val-Kill, Board of Directors (2004–2009)
- Chair of the Leo Nevas Task Force on Human Rights, United Nations Association of the USA (since 2011)

She testified before numerous US Congressional committees on International Relations, Human Rights, Justice, and the Tom Lantos Commission.

=== Beyond public service ===
Gaer participated on various committees, organizations and associations.

She was a program officer from the international division of the international organizations of the Ford Foundation (1974–1981). She was the executive director of the International League for Human Rights (1982–1991), followed by the executive director of the European programs of the United Nations Association of the US (1991–1992).

She was the director of the American Jewish Committee's Jacob Blaustein Institute for the Advancement of Human Rights from 1993. In 2010, she was a regents professor in the Department of History of the University of California, Los Angeles (UCLA).

Gaer died from metastatic breast cancer in New York City, on November 9, 2024, at the age of 78.

== Publications (selected) ==
=== Books ===
- Gaer, Felice D.; Broecker, Christen L., eds. (2013). The United Nations High Commissioner for Human Rights: Conscience for the World. Martinus Nijhoff Publishers.

=== Journal articles ===
- Gaer, Felice D. (1992). "First fruits: Reporting by states under the African Charter on Human and Peoples' Rights". Netherlands Quarterly of Human Rights. 10 (1): 29–42. doi:10.1177/016934419201000103. S2CID 151423739.
- Gaer, Felice D. (1995). "Reality check: human rights nongovernmental organisations confront governments at the United Nations". Third World Quarterly. 16 (3): 389–404. doi:10.1080/01436599550035960.
- Gaer, Felice D. (1997). "UN-Anonymous: Reflections on human rights in peace negotiations". Human Rights Quarterly. 19 (1): 1–8. doi:10.1353/hrq.1997.0004. S2CID 144922420.
- Gaer, Felice D. (2003). "Implementing international human rights norms: UN human rights treaty bodies and NGOs". Journal of Human Rights. 2 (3): 339–357. doi:10.1080/1475483032000133024. S2CID 145657757.
- Gaer, Felice D. (2003). "Human rights NGOs in UN peace operations". International Peacekeeping. 10 (1): 73–89. doi:10.1080/714002398. S2CID 144132062.
- Gaer, Felice D. (2007). "A voice not an echo: universal periodic review and the UN treaty body system". Human Rights Law Review. 7: 109–139. doi:10.1093/hrlr/ngl040.
- Leo, Leonard A.; Gaer, Felice D.; Cassidy, Elizabeth K. (2011). "Protecting Religions from Defamation: A Threat to Universal Human Rights Standards". Harv. JL & Public Policy. 34: 769.
- Gaer, Felice (2012). "'If Not Now, When?' Jewish Advocacy for Freedom of Religion". The Review of Faith & International Affairs. 10 (3): 73–79. doi:10.1080/15570274.2012.706092. S2CID 143551342.

=== Encyclopedia entries ===
- Gaer, Felice (2001). "Eleanor Roosevelt and the American Association of the United Nations". In Beasley, Maurine Hoffman; Shulman, Holly Cowan; Beasley, Henry R. (eds.). The Eleanor Roosevelt Encyclopedia. Greenwood Publishing Group. ISBN 9780313301810 – via Google Books.
- Gaer, Felice (2009). "Religious Freedom". In Forsythe, David P. (ed.). Encyclopedia of Human Rights. Vol. 1. Oxford University Press. ISBN 9780195334029 – via Google Books.
