= Michael L. Tichnor =

American real estate businessman and activist

Michael L. Tichnor is an American real estate businessman and activist. He was the founder and president of Tichnor Properties. He was the national president of the American Jewish Committee from 2023-2025.

== Biography ==
Michael L. Tichnor graduated from the University of Pennsylvania and Boston College Law School.. He was the founder and president of the real estate company Tichnor Properties.

Together with his wife Karen Tichnor, he has a long history of advocacy for the Jewish community of the Boston and MetroWest areas. He joined the American Jewish Committee in 2000 and became the organization's regional president for New England in 2009. He has been a member of the American Jewish Committee's Executive Council on a national level and became its national president in 2022, succeeding Harriet P. Schleifer. He currently serves as chair of AJC's Transatlantic Institute. He also currently serves on the board of directors of the Israel Policy Forum.

Tichnor has been a member of the boards of the Metrowest Jewish Day School and the CJP's Metrowest Committee. He was previously engaged in OneinForty, an organization that aims to raise awareness of genetic factors that increase the risk of cancer among Ashkenazi Jews. Tichnor was elected twice to the Select Board in Wayland, Massachusetts, serving as its chair.
