= Greece–Palestine relations =

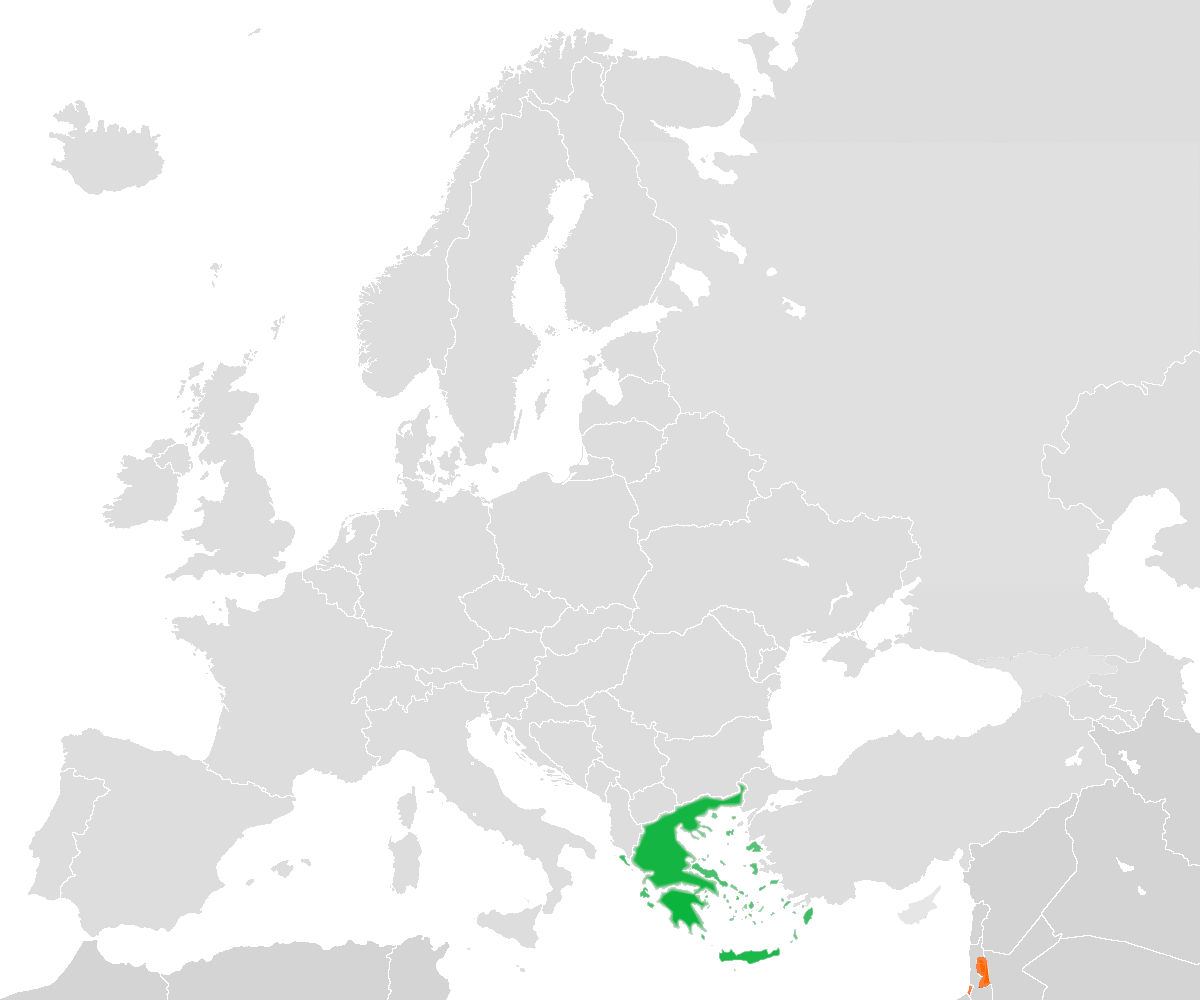

- Greece: Palestine

Greece–Palestine relations are bilateral relations between the Hellenic Republic and the State of Palestine. Due to the historical ties between the two countries, Greece and Palestine today enjoy excellent diplomatic relations. Palestine has a representative office in Athens and Greece's consulate general in Jerusalem is accredited to Palestine. The two countries are members of the East Mediterranean Gas Forum.

== History ==
During the '60s–'90s (peaking during the '70s), Palestinian organisations carried out a wave of terrorist attacks in Greece. In 1981 Greece established diplomatic relations with the PLO, but maintained relations with Israel at only the consular level until Greece's formal recognition of Israel in 1990 under Mitsotakis. Since the formation of current foreign policy under George Papandreou and especially under Prime Minister Kyriakos Mitsotakis, Greece has seen a rapid improvement in relations with Israel, following the deterioration of Israel's relations with Turkey caused by the 2010 Gaza flotilla raid. During the 2024 Jaffa shooting, Hamas gunmen killed several people including a Greek citizen. The Greek Foreign Ministry condemned the attack.

In 2001, there were 4,000 Palestinians residing in Greece.

== Diplomatic recognition ==
Greece has not fully formalized its relations with Palestine due to many geopolitical disputes, despite the pledges of then-Prime Minister Alexis Tsipras who is a member of the left-wing Syriza Party known for its support for the Palestinian cause, to make such changes.

In December 2015, the Hellenic parliament voted unanimously in the presence of President Mahmoud Abbas to recommend to the government the full recognition of the state of Palestine on 4 June 1967 borders with East Jerusalem as its capital.

== Palestinian question ==
President Karolos Papoulias has stated that Greece ultimately supports the creation of a Palestinian state alongside Israel. Under previous governments, Greece garnered a reputation as a staunch supporter of the Palestinian cause. Within the wider Arab–Israeli conflict, Andreas Papandreou maintained a stronger stand against Israel than any other government in the European Community.

On 15 May 2023, 41 municipalities in Greece raised the Palestinian flag on their buildings in solidarity with the Palestinian people marking the 75th anniversary of the Nakba. Two years later in May 2025, 33 municipalities raised the Palestinian flag to commemorate the 77th anniversary of the Nakba.

== See also ==
- Foreign relations of Greece
- Foreign relations of Palestine
- Greece–Israel relations
