= History News Network =

Website for historians writing about current events

The History News Network (HNN) is an online platform for historians to comment on current events, and place current news affairs into an historical perspective. HNN is hosted by the University of Richmond.

== History ==
HNN is a non-profit corporation registered in Washington, D.C. The network was founded by Richard Shenkman, author of Legends, Lies & Cherished Myths of World History. He served as HNN editor until his retirement in 2019. As of February 2025, Tony Field is managing editor. HNN sponsored several history-oriented blogs, including Liberty and Power (coordinated by David T. Beito) and Jim Loewen. Murray Polner was the long-time book editor for HNN.

In 2012, HNN celebrated Independence Day by holding a contest to select the worst books about American history ever published. Nominees included David Barton's The Jefferson Lies, Michael Bellesiles's Arming America, Gavin Menzies’s 1421: The Year China Discovered America, Richard G. Williams's 2006 book Stonewall Jackson: The Black Man's Friend and A People's History of the United States by Howard Zinn. Over 1000 HNN readers gave the nod to Barton and Zinn.

HNN, initially hosted by George Mason University, moved to George Washington University (GWU) in 2017. By 2019, after Shenkman’s retirement, the GWU Department of History assumed full responsibility for operating and editing HNN. On December 2023, the University of Richmond acquired HNN, integrating it into the university’s digital humanities ecosystem through its public history project tool known as 'Bunk'.
