= Present Tense (magazine) =

Defunct magazine of Jewish affairs

Present Tense was a magazine of Jewish affairs published by the American Jewish Committee (AJCommittee) from 1973 - 1990. Murray Polner was the editor from the time of the magazine's creation until its final issue. The magazine covered social and political issues in the United States, Israel and Jewish communities worldwide.

The magazine was initially established with a grant from Morris and Adele Bergreen, New York corporate attorneys and active members of AJCommittee leadership.

The magazine was issued on a bimonthly basis.
