= Murray Polner =

American editor and author (1928–2019)

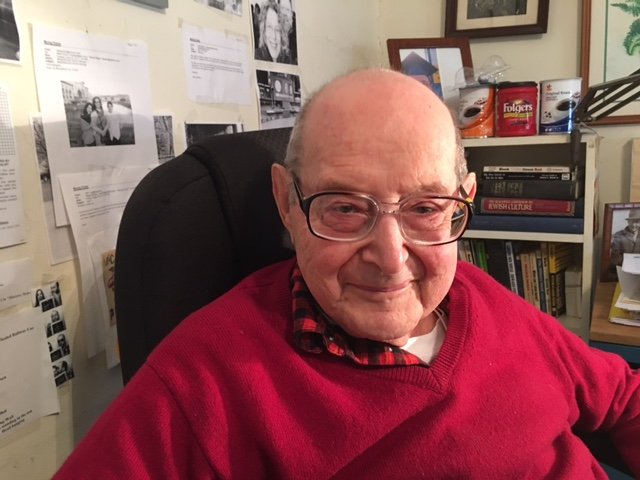
- Murray Polner in April 2017
- Born: March 15, 1928; Brownsville, Brooklyn, New York, U.S.
- Died: May 30, 2019 (aged 91); Great Neck, New York, U.S.
- Education: City College of New York (B.A.); University of Pennsylvania (M.A.); Union Institute & University (Ph.D.)
- Occupations: Editor, author, pacifist
- Spouse: Louise (Greenwald) Polner
- Children: 3
- Writing career
- Notable works: No Victory Parades; Branch Rickey: A Biography; Disarmed and Dangerous

Murray Polner (March 15, 1928 – May 30, 2019) was an American editor and author. He was the founding editor of Present Tense, a liberal current affairs magazine published by the American Jewish Committee, a job he held for the entire two decades that the magazine was published. He was an anti-Vietnam War activist and a committed pacifist.

== Background and education ==
The child of Jewish immigrants from Russia, Polner grew up in Brownsville, Brooklyn. He graduated from Samuel J. Tilden High School, City College of New York (1950), earned an M.A. in history from the University of Pennsylvania (1976), and a Ph.D. from Union Institute & University in Russian history (1972). He taught for 10 years in a high school in Brooklyn, worked as an adjunct professor at several area colleges in the New York area, and served as executive assistant to Harvey B. Scribner, the first chancellor of the New York City Public Schools.

He served in the military in Japan during the Korean War. He remained a vegetarian since his military service during the Korean War.

He moved to Great Neck, New York, in 1961 with his wife Louise (Greenwald) Polner, and lived there for the rest of his life. The Polners had three children, Beth Polner Abrahams, Robert Polner and Alex Polner.

== Career ==
Polner was the editor of the magazine Present Tense a liberal current affairs magazine published by the American Jewish Committee, from the time of its founding in 1973 until it ceased publication in 1990.

He was the book review editor of History News Network until 2017.

== Political views ==
Polner was a pacifist, although he allowed that the Holocaust was a difficult case, "It's the hardest question of all," he said, "and I'm not sure there's an answer."

== Books ==
- No Victory Parades: The Return of the Vietnam Veteran (1970)
- When Can I Come Home? a Debate on Amnesty for Exiles, Antiwar Prisoners, and Others (1972)
- Rabbi: The American Experience, (1977).
- Branch Rickey: A Biography, (1982)
- Disarmed and Dangerous: The Radical Lives and Times of Daniel and Philip Berrigan, the militant anti-war priests, (2007). with co-author Jim O'Grady
- We Who Dared to Say No to War: American Antiwar Writing from 1812 to Now, (2008) with Thomas E. Woods Jr.

== Edited books ==
- The Challenge of Shalom: The Jewish Tradition of Peace & Justice, (1994) co-edited with Naomi Goodman
- Peace, Justice, and Jews: Reclaiming Our Tradition, (2007) co-edited with Stefan Merken
