= Muslim-Jewish Advisory Council =

US interfaith, bipartisan collaboration

- Formation: 2016
- Location: United States
- Co-Chairs: Farooq Kathwari and Stanley M. Bergman
- Parent organization: American Jewish Committee and Islamic Society of North America
- Website: www.muslimjewishadvocacy.org

The Muslim-Jewish Advisory Council is an interfaith, bipartisan collaboration established by the American Jewish Committee and the Islamic Society of North America in early fall 2016. Its 46 members are business, religious, and political leaders from all over the United States. The council's actions include creating "a coordinated strategy to address anti-Muslim bigotry and antisemitism" and to "protect and expand the rights of religious minorities" in the United States. More recently the council has turned its focus to public policy advocacy targeting the rise in hate crimes based on religion in the United States.

The co-chairs of the council are Stanley Bergman, the CEO of Henry Schein, and Farooq Kathwari, the CEO of Ethan Allen. According to Bergman, "Our two communities share much in common and should find ways, where possible, to work together for the benefit of the entire country." Kathwari has said, "The Council aims to provide a model for civic engagement by two communities, vital to American society, that agree to work together on issues of common concern and overlapping interest." While the strategic need for the communities to work together is longstanding, discussions around the creation of the council began in the summer of 2016. AJC began reaching out to Muslim partner organisations and friends.

In November 2016 the Islamic Society of North America and the American Jewish Committee launched their first meeting. The council decided to focus on advocacy and on bringing together council members from each group to meet and get to know each other, as well as to discuss the group's mission and goals as a new council.

== Goals ==
The council has two main goals:

1. "Reversing the rise in hate crimes";
2. "Promoting the contributions of religious minorities to America".

== Members ==
There are forty-four members of the Muslim-Jewish Advisory Council, including the two co-chairs of the board. These members include business, political, and religious leaders in the American Jewish and American Muslim communities.

== Regional expansion ==
In addition to the National Council, MJAC has expanded across the United States with local regional councils. As of 2020, there are 11 regional councils in Dallas, Detroit, Houston, Kansas City, Los Angeles, Louisville, Miami, New Jersey, New York, Philadelphia, and Washington, D.C. Regional councils bring together local business, professional, civil society, and religious leaders from both communities to work on issues of common concern.
