= David Sasson =

Israeli diplomat who twice served as Ambassador to Greece

David Sasson (Hebrew: דוד ששון) is an Israeli diplomat who twice served as Ambassador to Greece, first as the first Israeli Ambassador to Greece in the early 1990s (the Jewish Telegraphic Agency states he is Israel’s second ambassador to Greece because “extended de jure recognition to Israel only last May. The previous representative, though of ambassadorial rank, could function only on the consular level.”) and again in the early 2000s, and was the first Israeli ambassador to the Federal Republic of Yugoslavia.
