= Ran Curiel =

Israeli diplomat

- רן קוריאל
- Born: 19 January 1949 (age 77); Israel
- Education: Tel Aviv University; University of Haifa; Hebrew University of Jerusalem; Johns Hopkins University

Ran Curiel (Hebrew: רן קוריאל; born 19 January 1949) is an Israeli diplomat.

== Early life and education ==
Curiel attended Tel Aviv University, where he studied Middle Eastern studies, African studies and archaeology. He received his Master's degree from the University of Haifa. 1990–92, Curiel studied European studies at the Hebrew University of Jerusalem and the Johns Hopkins University.

== Diplomatic career ==
In 1975, Curiel joined the Israeli Ministry of Foreign Affairs at the Israeli Embassy in Buenos Aires, serving as First Secretary from 1976 to 1981. Between 1981 and 1985, he worked in the Department of Western European Affairs in Jerusalem. Between 1985 and 1989, he served as counsellor at Israeli embassy in Washington, D.C. before returning to Jerusalem. In 1996, Curiel became the Israeli Ambassador to Greece, a position he held until 2001. Between 2007 and 2011, Curiel was Deputy Director General at the Israeli Ministry of Foreign Affairs and head of the Western European Department. Curiel served as Israeli Ambassador to the European Union and NATO from 2007 to 2011.

He is the father of designer Noa Curiel.
