= Mimouna Association =

The Mimouna Association is a Moroccan non-profit organization dedicated to preserving Moroccan Jewish heritage and culture.

== History ==
The Mimouna Association started in 2007 as a Muslim student-run club at Al Akhawayn University in Ifrane seeking to promote Jewish heritage and interfaith dialogue around the country. "One of the founding principles of the Association is to reclaim the cultural diversity of Morocco through its history. In a context where intolerance and extremism are rampant, Mimouna, as a Citizen Patriot Association, would like to contribute to the preserving and strengthening of the plural Moroccan identity."

It was originally known as the Mimouna Club.

In August 2012, the student club became an officially incorporated nonprofit organization with the name "Association Mimouna".

== Mission ==
The Mimouna Association is often cited as the leading entity in Morocco fighting antisemitism and strengthening ties between Muslims and Jews. Mimouna "has worked to educate young Moroccans about the Kingdom's rich Jewish history".

"a coalition of Muslim students who have taken on the task of highlighting the deep Jewish roots woven into Moroccan culture."

== Activities ==
- 2011: Conference Mohammed V: Righteous Among Nations
- 2014: The Caravan of Moroccan Jewish Heritage
- 2016: Ramadan Food Distribution
- 2019: Jewish Africa Conference

== Recognition ==
Thanks to his work with the Mimouna Association, founder and president, ElMehdi Boudra was listed among the "top 100 People Positively Influencing Jewish Life" on Algemeiner ‘J100’ 2018 listing.
