= Israeli settlement (disambiguation) =

Israeli settlements are Jewish civilian communities built on lands occupied by Israel in the 1967 Six-Day War.

The term Israeli settlement may also refer to:

- A type of settlement specific to Israeli culture:
  - Kibbutz, a communal agricultural community.
  - Moshava, early Zionist settlements in the 19th century
  - Moshav, a joint agricultural community.
  - Community settlement (Israel), where homeowners are organized in a cooperative.
- Israelite highland settlement, an ancient development
