= David Harris (advocate) =

American political activist

David Alan Harris
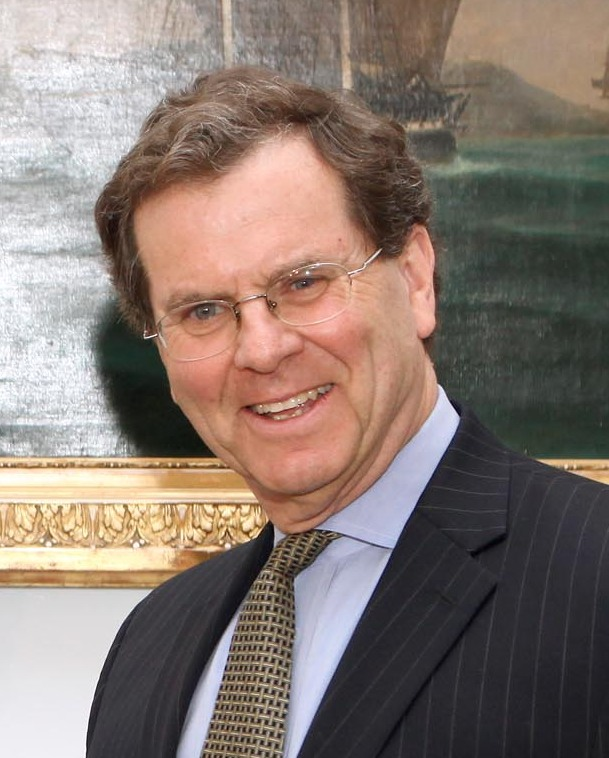
- Harris in 2012

CEO of American Jewish Committee
- In office 1990–2022
- Preceded by: Ira Silverman
- Succeeded by: Ted Deutch

Personal details
- Born: September 23, 1949 (age 77) New York City, New York, U.S.
- Children: 3

Not to be confused with David A. Harris, former President and C.E.O. of the now-defunct National Jewish Democratic Council or David Harris (activist).

David Alan Harris (born September 23, 1949) is an American political activist who was the CEO of the American Jewish Committee (AJC), from 1990 to 2022. During his tenure, AJC became a global organization and began quiet engagement with countries in the Arab world, laying the groundwork for the Abraham Accords. For his role in international diplomacy, former Israeli Prime Minister Shimon Peres called Harris "the foreign minister of the Jewish people."

== Early life ==
Harris was born in New York City in 1949 into a secular Jewish family. His parents were Holocaust survivors. He attended the Franklin School, then graduated from the University of Pennsylvania in 1971. He received a master's degree and completed his doctoral studies at the London School of Economics. Harris also was a Senior Associate at Oxford University (St. Antony's College).

== Career ==
=== Refusnik advocacy ===
In 1971, Harris worked as an English teacher in Moscow through a program with the American Field Service. During his time in the Soviet Union, Harris first became involved with Jewish refuseniks. Shortly after his arrival in Russia, Harris was arrested by Soviet authorities. After a stint in Helsinki, Harris joined the Hebrew Immigrant Aid Society (HIAS).

In 1974 and again in 1981, he was detained by Soviet authorities and, on the first occasion, was expelled from the country. In 1987, Harris was asked by the Jewish community to be the national coordinator for Freedom Sunday for Soviet Jewry—the 1987 demonstration in Washington that drew over 250,000 participants, the largest Jewish gathering in American history.

=== American Jewish Committee ===
In 1979, he began working for the American Jewish Committee (AJC). In 1981, he left the AJC to take a position at the National Coalition Supporting Soviet Jewry. In 1984, he returned to the AJC and became head of its Washington, D.C. office in 1987. Beginning in 1990, Harris was the executive director and then the CEO of the AJC.

Harris is a leading Jewish advocate who meets with world leaders to advance Israel's diplomatic standing and promote international human rights and inter-religious and inter-ethnic understanding.

Harris was central to the emigration of over one million Jews from the Soviet Union.

For 16 years, Harris was involved in the successful struggle to repeal the controversial "Zionism is racism" resolution (United Nations General Assembly Resolution 3379) adopted by the United Nations General Assembly in 1975, only the second time in UN history a resolution was repealed. He spearheaded the AJC's successful campaign to change Israel's status at the United Nations as the only nation ineligible to sit on the Security Council and to include it in one of the United Nations' five regional groups.

On behalf of AJC, Harris has been involved in a number of humanitarian initiatives in response to natural and man-made disasters, including in the Balkans, Middle East, Africa, Asia, Latin America and the United States.

Harris has testified before the United States Congress in both the House and the Senate on several occasions regarding the Middle East, NATO expansion, Russian and Soviet affairs, and anti-Semitism, as well as before the United Nations Commission on Human Rights and the French Parliament.

In 2008, Harris spoke at the World Economic Forum in Davos at a plenary session entitled, "Faith and Modernization."

He retired in October 2022, replaced by Florida Congressman Ted Deutch.

== Affiliations ==
David Harris is a member of the Council on Foreign Relations. From 2000 to 2002, he was a visiting scholar at the Johns Hopkins University School of Advanced International Studies.

From 2009 to 2011, he was a Senior Associate at Oxford University (St. Antony's College).

== Published works ==
Harris's book, Antisemitism: What Everyone Needs to Know, published by Oxford University Press in 2025, provides a history of antisemitism, exploring in particular its resurgence in contemporary times.

- In the Trenches: Selected Speeches and Writings of an American Jewish Activist, Vol. 1, 1979–99, KTAV, ISBN 978-0-88125-693-2
- In the Trenches: Selected Speeches and Writings of an American Jewish Activist, Vol. 2, 2000–01, KTAV, ISBN 978-0-88125-779-3
- In the Trenches: Selected Speeches and Writings of an American Jewish Activist, Vol. 3, 2002–03, KTAV, ISBN 978-0-88125-842-4
- In the Trenches: Selected speeches and Writings of an American Jewish Activist, Vol. 4, 2004–05, KTAV, ISBN 978-0-88125-927-8
- In the Trenches: Selected Speeches and Writings of an American Jewish Activist, Vol. 5, 2006–07, KTAV, ISBN 978-0-88125-927-8
- The Jewish World, HIAS, ASIN BOOOIBR1MG
- Entering a New Culture: A Handbook for Soviet Migrants to the United States of America, HIAS, ASIN BOOO6CRK6Y
- The Jokes of Oppression (with Izrail Ravinovich), Jason Aronson, ISBN 978-1-56821-414-6

== Honors and decorations ==
- Honorary doctorate by Hebrew Union College (2003)

Ribbon bar	Country	Honor	Date
	Greece	Commander of the Order of the Phoenix (Greece)	9 July 2019
	Germany	Order of Merit (Knight's Commander Cross)	3 June 2022
	Austria	Grand Decoration of Honour in Gold for Services to the Republic of Austria	12 June 2022
