= Maynard Wishner =

American financier and theater actor (1923–2011)

Maynard I. Wishner (1923-2011) was an American financier and former actor in the Yiddish theater from Chicago.

Wishner was born and grew up in Chicago. He graduated from the University of Chicago in 1945, and obtained a J.D. from the same institution in 1947.

From 1947 to 1952, Wishner worked for the Chicago Mayor's Commission on Human Relations, as head of the commission's department of law and order and then as acting director. He was then appointed chief city prosecutor for the city's Law Department. He was an attorney with the firm of Cole, Wishner, Epstein & Manilow before joining Walter E. Heller & Co., a finance company, where he eventually served as president and chief operating officer. He retired in 1985.

Wishner was Jewish and served as the National President of the American Jewish Committee in 1980–1983, President of the Council of Jewish Federations, and Chairman of the Jewish United Fund. He was a president of what is now the Jewish Federations of North America and chaired what is now the Jewish Council for Public Affairs. He also held prominent positions in the Chicago Jewish United Fund/Jewish Federation, the Jewish Community Relations Council, and Jewish Family and Community Service.

Wishner died in 2011.
