= Asarsi Getu =

Ethiopian Jewish nurse

- אסרסי גטו
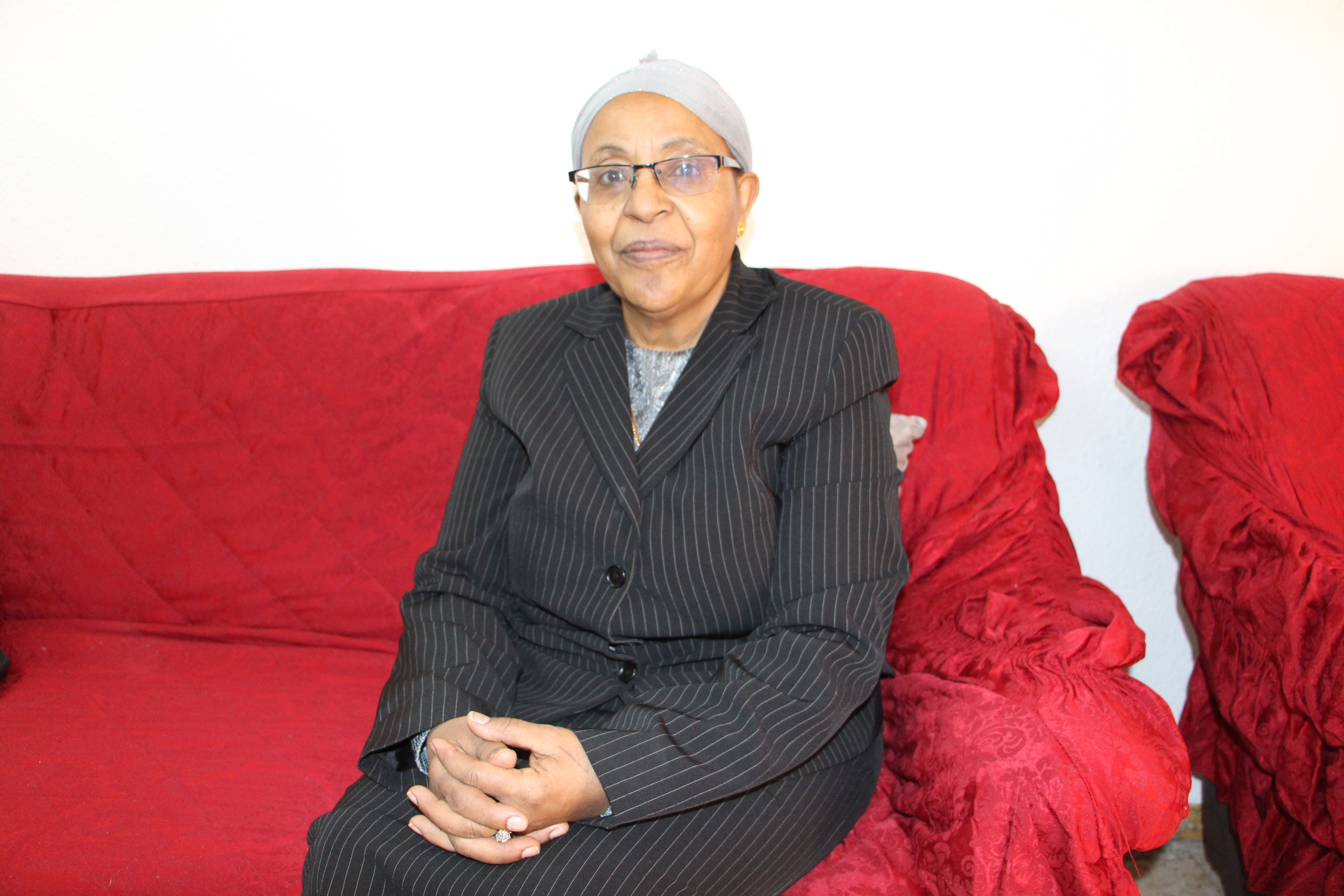
- Asarsi Getu in 2019.
- Born: Asarsi Getu-Sahla-Gramai; 1958 (age 67–68); Geina, Gondar, Ethiopia
- Occupation: Nurse
- Known for: Nursing at Red Cross refugee camps in Sudan, aiding Ethiopian Jewish refugees
- Spouse: Baruch Garmai
- Children: 1 daughter, 1 son
- Awards: Heroine of Israeli Society by the Yerusalem Forum

Asarsi Getu (Hebrew: אסרסי גטו) or Asarsi Getu-Sahla-Gramai (born 1958) is an Israeli nurse of Beta Israel origin, who in the mid-1980s served as a nurse for the Red Cross refugee camps in Sudan. She saved the lives of many patients, secretly giving medicines to those who could not purchase them, and was responsible for distributing aid funds Ethiopian Jewish refugees fleeing Ethiopia on their way to Israel.

== Early years ==
Asarsi was born in the village of Geina in the province of Gondar in 1958, the youngest of ten children. Her father, Sahlo Getu, was a farmer and head of the local community, which numbered 58 Jewish families. In the 1960s, a Jewish school was opened in the village by Yona Bogale, an Ethiopian Jewish community leader fostering Beta Israel education and aliyah. Counter to prevailing custom in Ethiopia at the time, Asarsi's father was persuaded to send not only his sons but also his daughters to school. After four years of schooling in the village, Asarsi refused to marry; she persuaded her parents to allow her instead to complete 12 years of schooling in the city of Azezo. She continued her studies at the School of Nursing in Debre Tabor.

== Career ==
After completing her training as a nurse in 1983, the authorities decided to send her to work on the Asmara front, where battles were fought between the Eritrean rebels and the army, as part of the Ethiopian Civil War. On the advice of her family, Asarsi joined one of the groups that set out on a journey to Israel via Sudan, the only one from her family and the entire village that set out on the journey at this stage. Along the way, her skills as a nurse were often required to care for the participants in the journey, including infants, the elderly and pregnant women.

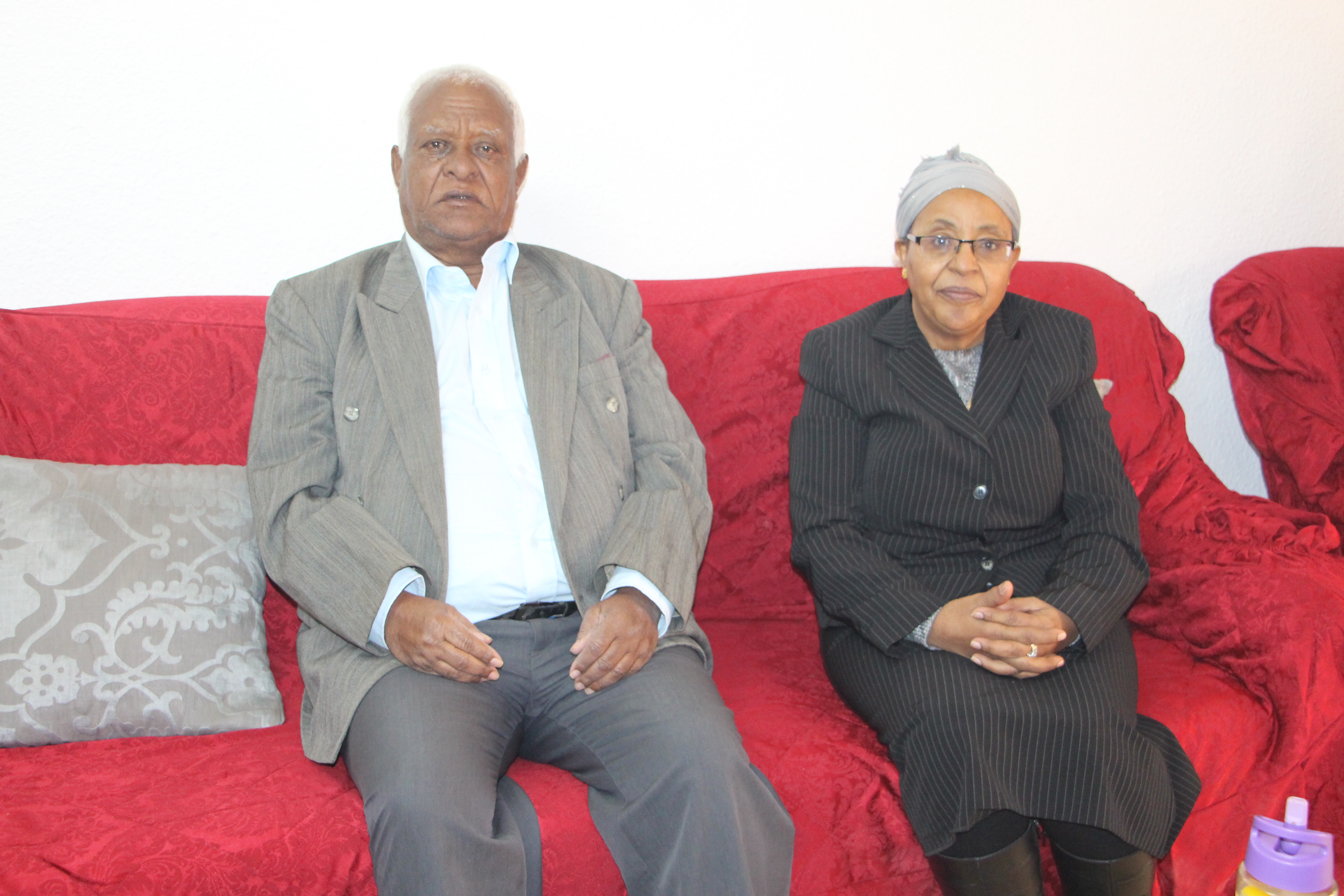
Asarsi Getu with Ashgere Zallo.

== Refugee camps in Sudan ==
In 1984, the group crossed the border from Ethiopia into Sudan and reached the Wad al-Hilu refugee camp, near El-Gadarif. The refugees were suffering from a shortage of food and clean water, many diseases, a lack of medical services, and harassment by the locals. Many Ethiopian Jews were killed in refugee camps in Sudan while waiting to immigrate to Israel. Asarsi appealed to the Red Cross to allow her volunteer for the organization. After proving her professional skills, she was accepted as a full-time Red Cross nurse.

As part of her work, she cared for many refugees of all faiths, but especially Jewish refugees who were refused medical treatment due to religious discrimination by various Red Cross staff. At Asarsi’s request, she was also assigned to work in the refugee camp clinic's pharmacy, a position that allowed her to help Jews who were unable to purchase the medicines they needed. Risking her life, she secretly gave patients free medicine, and sometimes bought medicines for them out of her own pocket money. Fearing that she would be abducted by local Sudanese and forced to marry, Asarsi decided to marry a Jewish bachelor, whom she had known before she arrived at the camp. Following her meeting with Henry Gould, one of the founders of the NGO Canadian Physicians for Aid and Relief (CPAR), Asarsi began assisting in the distribution of aid funds to Jewish families in the refugee camp. This activity was stopped after she received threats from refugees found ineligible for assistance, and after a warning that the camp would be closed by the Sudanese authorities following her activities.

In 1985, when the entire Beta Israel community in the Wad al-Hilu camp emigrated to Israel as part of Operation Moses, Asarsi decided to leave Sudan, as well. Although she wanted to emigrate to Israel, the route was blocked following a press leak about the immigration of Ethiopian Jewry. With the help of Ethiopian Jewish activists working for the Mossad, she received assistance from the Canadian Embassy in Sudan. Asarsi, who at the time was in advanced pregnancy, gave birth to her daughter at a hospital in Khartoum, and about a month later, in May 1985, arrived with her family in Canada.

== Life in Canada and aliyah ==
Asarsi began studying medicine in Winnipeg, but due to Ethiopia’s imprisonment of two of her brothers, who were aliyah activists in Gondar, she was forced to drop out of medical school and work to help financially support her family still in Ethiopia. She was hired at a local hospital as a night-shift nurse, and later worked as a secretary. She helped raise funds, from the local Jewish community, for Ethiopian Jewry. During this time, she raised her daughter by herself, as a single parent, after divorcing her husband. Through a five-year effort, she managed to bring her mother from Ethiopia to Canada; her mother later immigrated to Israel. With the help of the Mossad, her two brothers were released from Ethiopian prison, immigrated to Israel, and were recognized by Israel as Prisoners of Zion. About a year later, in 1992, Asarsi immigrated to Israel with her daughter. In Israel, she met Baruch Garmai, whom she had known in Ethiopia. The two are married and live in Jerusalem. Asarsi continues to work as a nurse, while Garmai served as a security guard at the Knesset until his retirement.

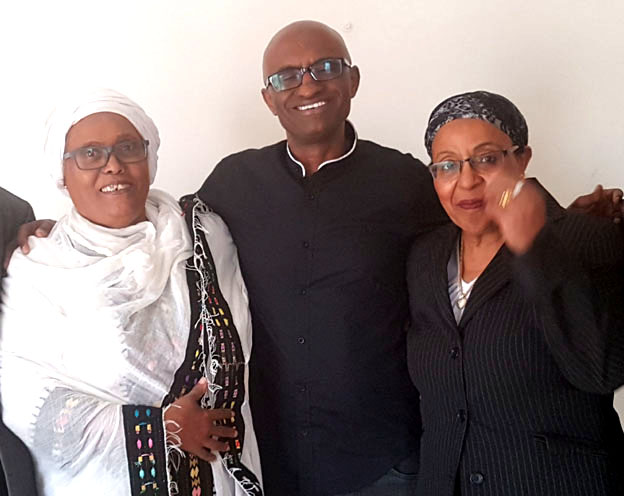
Shmuel Yelma with Herut Takele and Asarsi Getu (right) at the Yerusalem Forum at the Tel Aviv Cinematheque in 2019.

== Honors ==
- On the Memorial Day for Ethiopian Jews who perished on their way to Israel, which was held in Jerusalem in 2018, a meeting was held between Asarsi and one of the babies she rescued in Sudan - Yassu Zallo, and his parents Ashgere and Varkanu Zallo.
- Asarsi was chosen as the "heroine of Israeli society" at a conference on female leadership in the Ethiopian-Israeli community, held by the Yerusalem Forum.
- In the book "Trailblazing Leadership", published by the Yerusalem Forum, a chapter was devoted to her story.
