= Lynn Singer =

American activist for the rights of Soviet Jewry 'refuseniks'

- Born: 1925
- Died: November 30, 2005 (aged 79–80); East Meadow, New York, U.S.
- Occupation: Activist

Roselyn "Lynn" Brod Singer (born March 13, 1925 in Manhattan – died November 30, 2005) was an American activist for the rights of Soviet Jewry 'refuseniks'. As the leader of the Long Island Committee for Soviet Jewry and a member of the board of the Union of Councils for Soviet Jews, she brought the issue of Jews trapped in the Soviet Union to international attention through a series of political actions, including sit-ins at the United Nations and the Soviet compound in Glen Cove, as well as protests and marches.

== Biography ==
=== Early life ===
Born to Harry Brod and Sarah "Sally" Kandel Brod, both of them New York born Jews, Lynn married Murray Singer in New York in 1948, and was initially a housewife living in Queens, and then Long Island, raising two children, before becoming more and more involved in community activism and civil rights.

=== Activist career in the 1980s ===
Throughout the 1980s, Singer personally made long-distance phone calls to refuseniks trapped in Moscow and Leningrad daily, as part of a grassroots network of activists run by Cleveland scientist and Soviet Jewry activist Lou Rosenblum.

She was the national coordinator in the United States for the group Women for Ida Nudel (WIN), which appealed to elected women officials to press for the release of Ida Nudel, an anti-Soviet activist who was sentenced to four years in a Siberian prison after seven years of challenging the Soviet treatment of Jewish political prisoners.

After Mikhail Gorbachev's glasnost policy in the late 1980s started to release some of the more high-profile refuseniks from prison, and allowed some of them to emigrate, Singer and her fellow activists continued to fight, but began concentrating more on more typical Soviet Jewish families who were still trapped behind the Iron Curtain.

=== Legacy ===
At her death in 2005, Singer had lived in East Meadow, New York.

Israeli politician and former Soviet prisoner Natan Sharansky told Singer's children, Andrea and Richard, that Singer was "his second mother". Members of the association (Amuta) Remember and Save referred to her as "our Yiddishe Mama" and counted her as a family friend. In 2009, the association published a book about her life, with remembrances from the many refugees she had helped.

She is listed on the posthumous Roll of Honor of the Archive of the American Soviet Jewry Movement.
