= Herut Takele =

Israeli activist (born 1938)

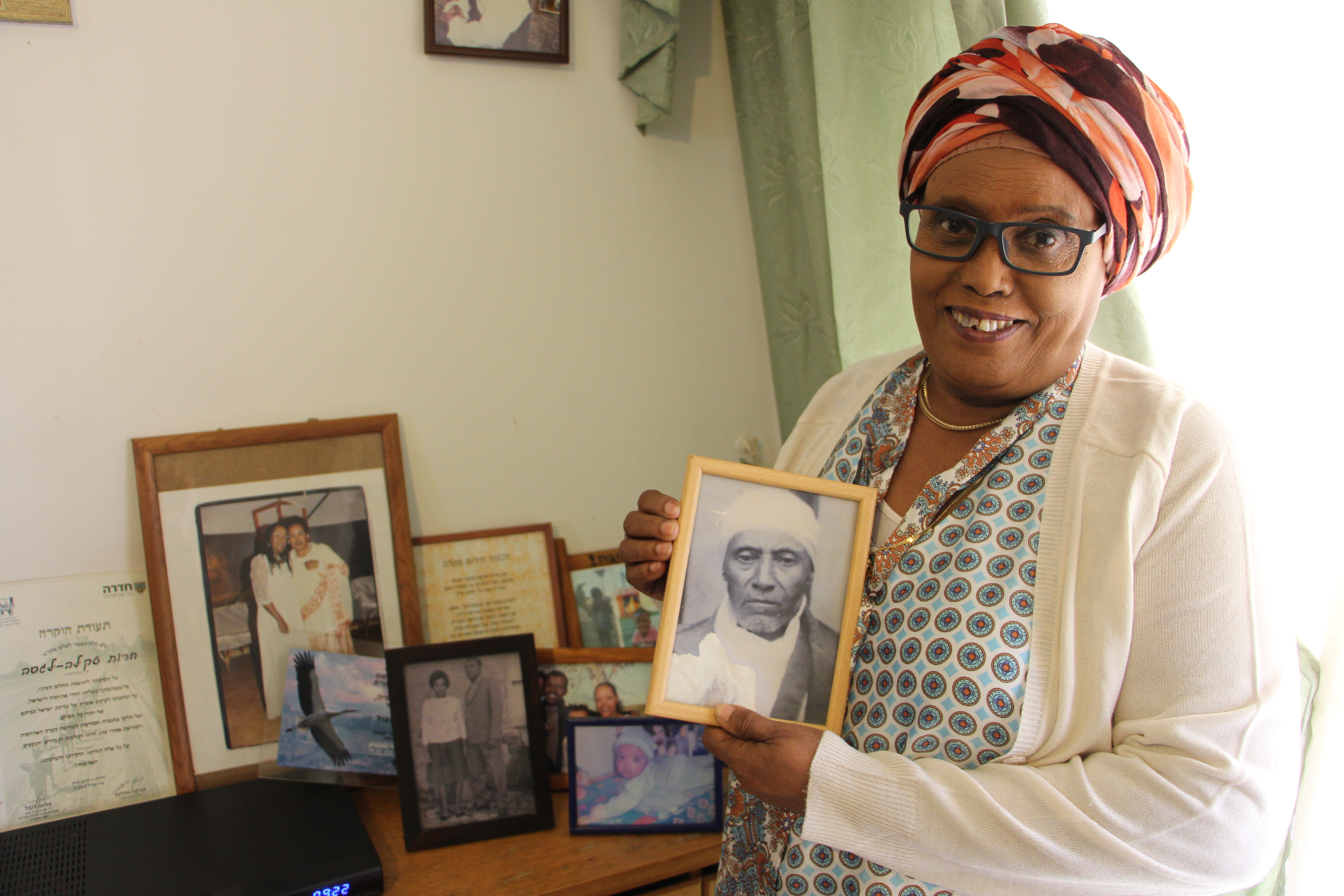
Herut Takele with a photo of her father.

Herut Takele Legese (Hebrew: חרות טקלה לגסה; born 1938) is an Israeli activist of Beta Israeli origin, who engaged in underground activities in Ethiopia in the 1980s to promote the aliyah to Israel of Ethiopian Jewry. She was arrested by the regime of Mengistu Haile Mariam and imprisoned in Ethiopia for about two years. After emigrating to Israel in 1990, Takele was recognized by the Israeli government as a prisoner of Zion.

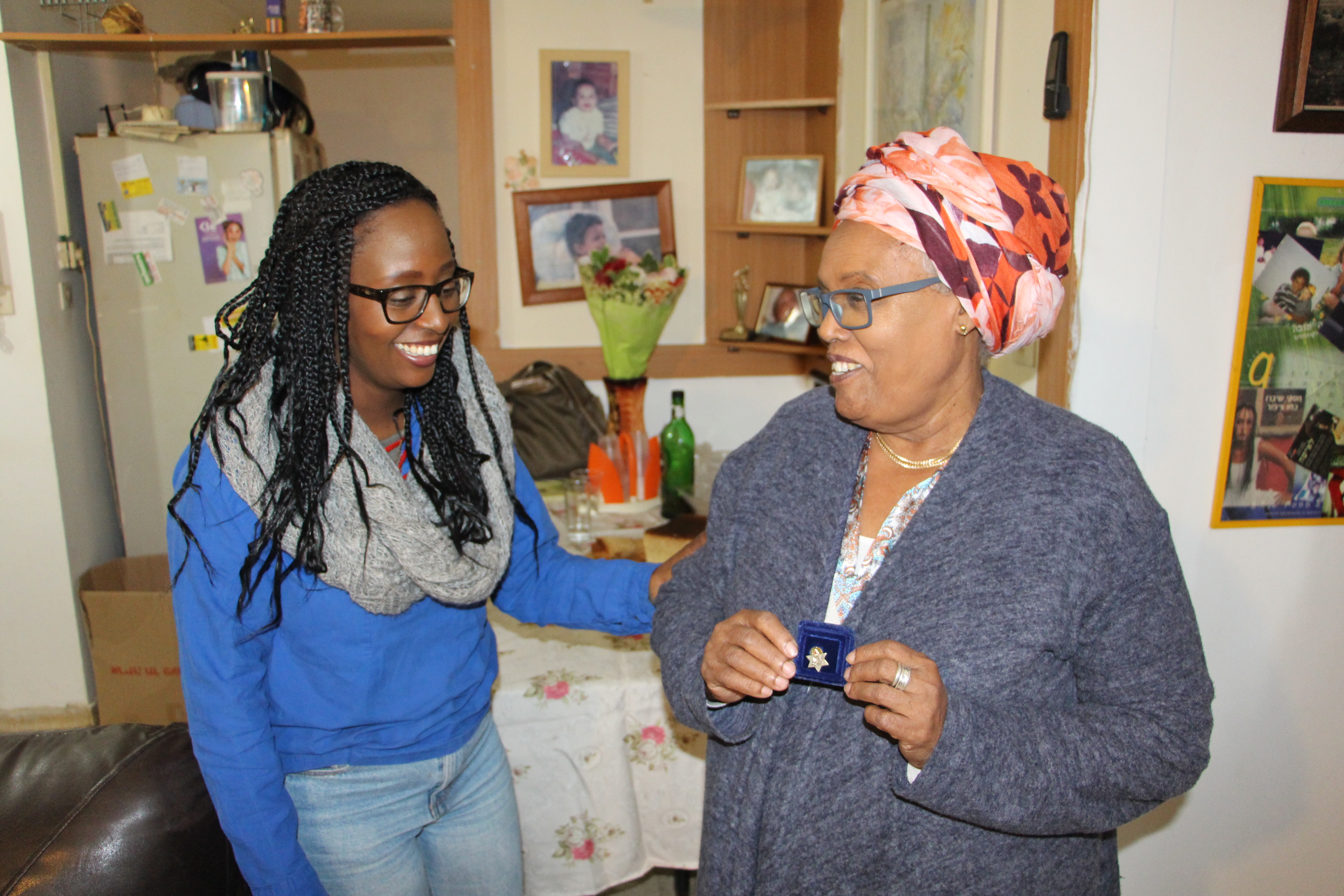
Herut Takele receiving the Prisoner of Zion pin. Hadera, 2018.

== Early years ==
Takele was born in Qwara, Ethiopia. Her father, Elka Takele, who was a Hebrew teacher, educated his children with a strong Jewish and communal identity. In 1942, her father was appointed secretary to the governor of Azezo, a town near Gondar, and the family relocated to Azezo. At the age of 16, Takele moved to Gondar with her elder brother, so that she could acquire an education, which was a rare step in that era in Ethiopia.

== Activism ==
During the 1970s, Takele met with immigration activist Yamatu Negus Ezra. Ezra introduced her to other aliyah activists, including Gedaliah Eileen and David Shimon. In 1982, Takele was recruited by Henry Rosenberg of the American Association for Ethiopian Jews to work for helping the aliyah of Ethiopian Jews. Thus Takele began taking part in underground Zionist activities, at a time when this was considered illegal by the Derg. Risking her life, she assisted in hiding Ethiopian Jews seeking to emigrate to Israel, providing medical care, issuing passports, transferring funds and locating hiding places. Among others, the methods used to help the emigration of Ethiopian Jews ranged from fictitious employment contracts with companies abroad, scholarships abroad and bribes in exchange for an exit permit.

== Arrest and imprisonment ==
In 1986, on her way to immigrate to Israel, a group of Jews was captured by Ethiopian authorities; the men were interrogated under severe torture and finally broke and named Takele as the person who had helped them. She was arrested by the police and imprisoned in the central prison in Addis Ababa. She was jailed in complete isolation from her children and family, in a prison cell with no windows, tortured and abused, suffered from cold and starvation, and subjected to torture during interrogations, but refused to turn over her partners.

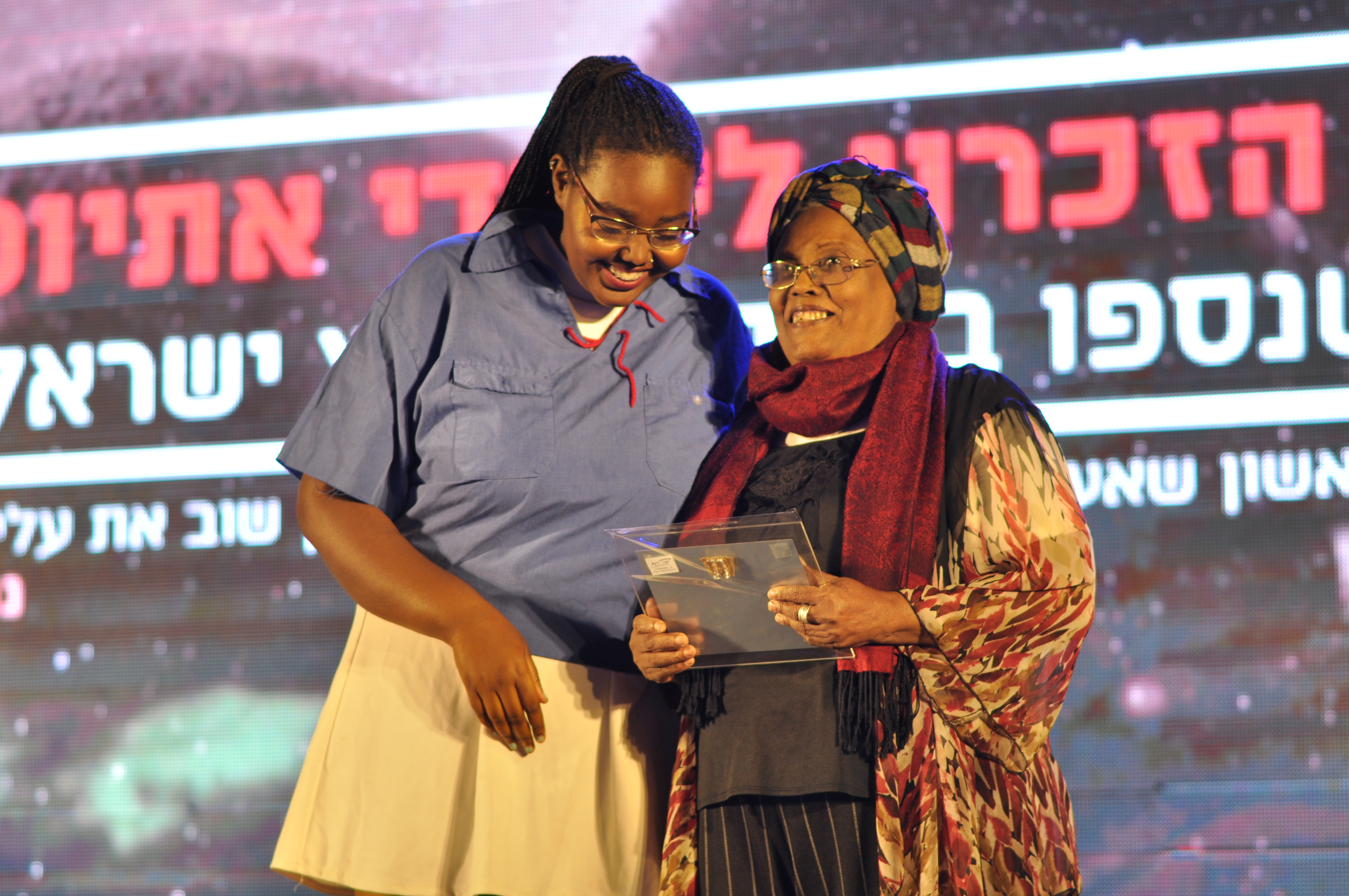
Herut Takele in a memorial ceremony for the Ethiopian Jews who perished on their way to Israel held by the Noar HaOved youth movement. Netanya, 2017.

== Emigration to Israel ==
In January 1990, Takele immigrated to Israel with her three young children. She was recognized as a prisoner of Zion, lived in Holon and worked at the Kirya Maternity Hospital in Tel Aviv. After that, she moved to Hadera, and until her retirement served as a teacher for new immigrants from Ethiopia, as a counselor who assists immigrants in their integration into Israel, and coordinates a nursing home.

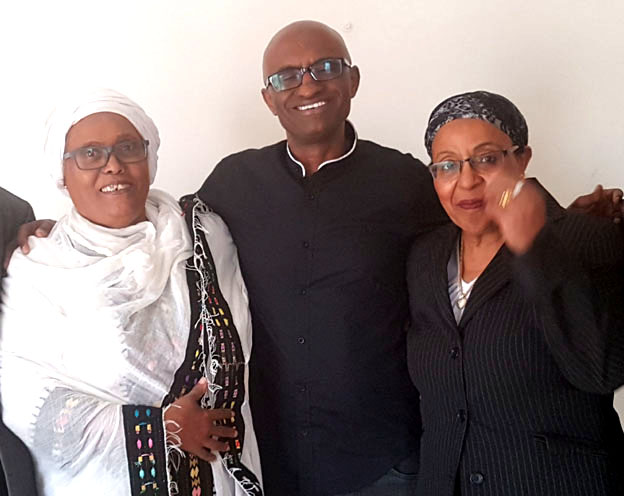
Shmuel Yelma with Herut Takele (left) and Asarsi Getu at the Yerusalem Forum at the Tel Aviv Cinematheque in 2019.
