= Alexander Smukler =

Soviet-born American businessman

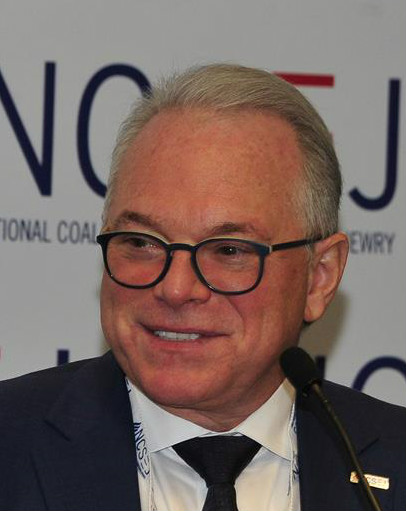
- Born: 1960 (age 65–66); Moscow, Soviet Union
- Known for: National Coalition Supporting Eurasian Jewry

Alexander Smukler (born 1960) is a Soviet-born American businessman, who is the chairman of the board of Agroterminal LTD and the chairman of the board of Century 21: Russia, Kazakhstan, and Ukraine. He is a former managing partner of Ariel Investment Group, which develops commercial enterprises and civil engineering projects in Russia.

Smukler is a former refusenik who advocated for the rights of Jews in the former Soviet Union. He left the Soviet Union in 1991 and moved to the United States, where he became a prominent member of the American Jewish community and continued his activism on behalf of Jews from the former Soviet Union.

Smukler was elected president of National Coalition Supporting Eurasian Jewry in 2008.

== Early life ==
The Smukler family's ancestry can be traced back for many generations in Russia. The family history is the subject of a book called The Tsar’s Drummer: A Story of Courage and Resilience, published in 2019. Smukler's mother was a doctor who worked in a space-related research program.

Smukler began studying Hebrew in the late 1970s. He completed undergraduate and graduate degrees from the Moscow University of Technology in civil construction.

== Activism in the Soviet Union ==
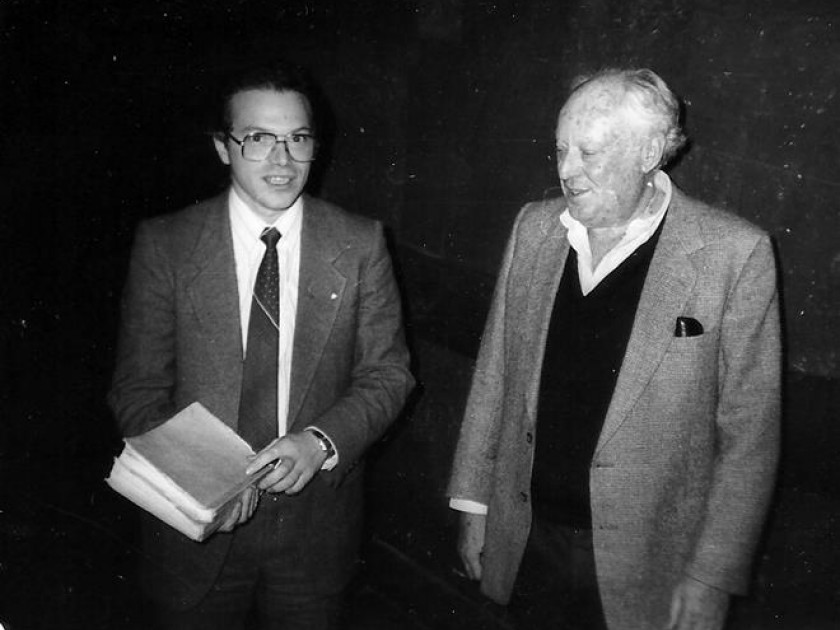
Alexander Smukler (left) presents a samizdat copy of Exodus in Russian to author Leon Uris. Moscow, November 1989.

In the 1980s, Smukler participated in underground samizdat networks, expanding the variety of reading material available to Soviet Jews. He applied for an exit visa in 1985. He was refused permission to emigrate and forced to live on odd jobs. Smukler supported his family by giving chess lessons. He was a Hebrew student of Yuli Edelstein, a refusenik who later became speaker of the Israeli Knesset.

In 1987, Smukler became the editor of The Information Bulletin on Issues of Repatriation and Jewish Culture and joined the organizational committee Mashka. Mashka was a secret group of eight people who coordinated efforts to take care of prisoners of Zion, support the families of the prisoners, and teach Hebrew.

In 1987, Smukler told The New York Times that the policies of Soviet leader Mikhail Gorbachev gave some hope that the Soviet Union would become more democratic.

In 1989, author Leon Uris visited Russia. Smukler presented Uris with an underground handmade copy of Uris' novel Exodus in Russian. One witness at the meeting said that Smukler's gift brought Uris close to tears.

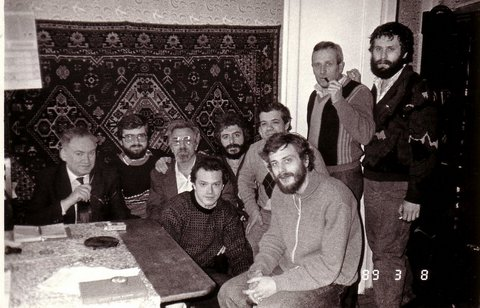
Mashka meeting in Moscow in 1989. Alexander Smukler is seated in the center.

Smukler was the founder of Vaad, the first independent Jewish movement in the Soviet Union. Vaad was an umbrella organization of Jewish cultural groups.

Smukler was the executive director of B’nai B’rith of the USSR and the Jewish Information Center of Moscow.

He left the Soviet Union in 1991. He told The Jewish Chronicle that year that there was no decrease in antisemitism in the Soviet Union and there were almost daily antisemitic demonstrations.

Smukler's archives are held at the Wende Museum.

== Activism in the United States ==
In 2004, Smukler was elected vice president of the National Coalition Supporting Eurasian Jewry (NCSEJ). In 2008, he was elected president of the organization.

As the head of NCSEJ, Smukler represented Russian-speaking Jews at the Conference of Presidents of Major American Jewish Organizations. In 2020, Smukler said he was surprised that the Conference of Presidents elected Dianne Lob as incoming chair. Smukler said that Lob had "a clear record of partnering with anti-Israel organizations like J Street, IfNotNow, CAIR and others."

Smukler is the president and founder of the American Foundation for Orphans Abroad.

== Personal life ==
Smukler lives in Montclair, New Jersey. He is married and has three sons.

Smukler is an art collector with a substantial collection of Russian–Jewish art.
