= Cleveland Council on Soviet Anti-Semitism =

Cleveland Council on Soviet Anti-Semitism is an American organization founded in 1963 as a grassrootshuman rights campaign to alleviate the growing oppression of the Jewish community inside the Soviet Union and the other Soviet bloc countries. The Cleveland Council was the first organization of the American Soviet Jewry Movement, a human rights campaign of the 1960s, 70s and 80s.

== History ==
The Cleveland Council was founded in October 1963 by Louis Rosenblum, a NASA scientist; Herbert Caron, a psychologist; and Daniel Litt, a Reform rabbi. Abe Silverstein, Director of the NASA Lewis Research Center (now the John Glenn Research Center), served as the inaugural honorary board chairman. The Cleveland Council's goals were to "galvanize" American Jewish organizations to undertake a public campaign to pressure the USSR to grant rights to its Jewish citizens, including the right to emigrate, and to inspire the American Jewish community to create an organization dedicated to the liberation of Soviet Jewry from antisemitic oppression.

The founding of the Cleveland Council was controversial because much of the American Jewish establishment believed that effectively pressuring the Soviet Union to cease antisemitic treatment of Jews was not only hopeless, but might prove counterproductive, might, that is, lead the Russian authorities to treat Jews even worse. Soviet Jews in the 1960s were deprived of the freedom to practice their religion by Soviet policies such as bans of baking matzah for the celebration of the Passover holiday and circumcision.

The Cleveland Council rapidly became well-known, staging large rallies and innovative protests at events featuring touring Soviet sports and theatrical groups and publishing how-to guides to publicizing the plight of Soviet Jewry that circulated nationally.

The Cleveland Council was one of the founding organizations of the Union of Councils for Soviet Jews in 1970.
