= Shoshana S. Cardin =

Shoshana Shoubin Cardin (1926–2018) was a trailblazing activist and volunteer for women's rights and Jewish causes.

At the time she broke ground for women's issues, both as a crusader and as the first woman to hold leadership positions in the Baltimore and in the Jewish community. For example, she was the first female chair of the Associated Jewish Community Federation of Baltimore (now UJC) and first woman to lead each of these organizations: the Council of Jewish Federations, the United Israel Appeal, the Conference of Presidents of Major American Jewish Organizations, the Center for Learning and Leadership, the National Conference on Soviet Jewry (NCSJ), and the Jewish Telegraphic Agency.

To date she is also the only person to have headed all of these major national Jewish organizations in the United States: the Council of Jewish Federations (1984), the National Council on Soviet Jewry (1988), the Conference of Presidents of Major American Jewish Organizations (1991) and the United Israel Appeal (1994).

Many consider her to be one of the most influential Jewish leaders of the century.

== Early life and education ==
Shoshana Shoubin Cardin was born in a Hadassah Clinic in Tel Aviv on October 10, 1926, to Sraiah and Chana Barbalat Shoubin. Due drought, poor conditions and lack of food, her family immigrated to the United States in 1927, joining other family members in Baltimore, Maryland.

Cardin attended Johns Hopkins University from 1942 to 1945, and received her Bachelor of Arts degree from UCLA in 1946. In 1979 she obtained an MA in Planning and Administration from Antioch University . She married her husband, Jerome, in 1948.

From 1946, Cardin taught elementary school in the Baltimore County school district. Since the law in the 1950s did not allow married teachers who got pregnant to teach, Cardin resigned when she became pregnant with her first child and devoted her time to her family and to community action.

== Volunteer and philanthropic activity ==
In the 1950s and 60s Cardin actively volunteered for many different organizations in Baltimore, and in 1965 Cardin was appointed president of the Federation of Jewish Women’s Organizations, an umbrella organization coordinating Jewish organizations in Maryland. She used this platform to raise awareness and increase the involvement of the Jewish community in the emerging civil rights movement.

=== Activism on behalf of women ===
In 1967 Cardin was elected as a Baltimore County (District 2) delegate to the Maryland Constitutional Convention of 1967-1968, established to redraft the Maryland State Constitution. Cardin worked on committees that addressed women's issues, entitled Suffrage and Election. She was involved in the Maryland Commission on the Status of Women (later MCW), established to identify policies, practices, government programs offering opportunities to women, and to work with government agencies to open up more fields to women. She was active with Commission throughout the 1970s, chairing it from 1974 to 1979.

She helped plan MCWs first participation in the International Women’s Year in 1975 and 1977, organizing seminars on women’s health and legal concerns, volunteerism, education, credit, employment, the Equal Rights Amendment, and rape. She prepared a booklet, Getting it Together! Handbook on How to Run a Fair, 1974, to help MCW organize its participation.

MCW worked with the Maryland Senate on rape legislation and helped to organize the first Maryland state conference concerning battered women. This led to the creation of the House of Ruth, a haven for victims of domestic violence.

==== Financial credit for women ====
Cardin was very concerned about women's ability to obtain financial credit and worked to educate them about their rights. In the mid 1970s she testified in Congress and in the Maryland legislature to convince legislators and lobbied for changes in federal and state laws to enable to obtain credit in women's own names, rather than their father's or husband's. She wrote a pamphlet, “Where Credit is Due,” which explained to women how they could ensure their ability to get credit, and fairly and helped set up a hotline where women who were unfairly denied credit could get help. In 1977 Cardin appeared on “The Today Show” and debated someone from Diner’s Club about its refusal to issue credit cards in women’s names.

Because of her financial activism she was offered a job to travelling around the country to teach women about financial rights and also what to do in case of financial discrimination. She was also nominated to serve on the Federal Reserve Board. She did not accept these jobs, choosing to stay closer to home.

From 1979 to 1982 she was commissioner of Maryland’s Commission on Human Relations and chair of Maryland’s State Employment and Training Council.

=== Jewish causes ===
In the late 1970s Cardin became very active in Baltimore’s Jewish Community Center as well as other Jewish and Women's causes. In 1983 she was elected president of the Associated Jewish Charities and Welfare Fund of Baltimore.

In 1984 she was elected president of the Council of Jewish Federations, which represents the 200 community federations in the United States and Canada, the first woman to lead a major national Jewish organization. A few years later as she chairperson of the United Israel Appeal, the organization that allocates the money raised in the United States for Israel, from 1994 to 1998, she helped merge the two organizations, forming the Jewish Federation of North America.

Cardin was the first female Chair the Conference of Presidents of Major American Jewish Organizations from January 1991 through December 1992. The Conference, a coalition of the large Jewish organizations, represents the Jewish community’s interests to the U.S. Government.

==== Soviet Jewry ====
She served as Chairwoman of the National Conference of Soviet Jewry, from 1988 to 1992, a time when U.S. Jewish organizations were lobbying for free emigration and religious freedom of Soviet Jews. She spoke at the seminal rally held on the Mall in Washington, DC, in December 1987 with 250,000 participants. It has since been dubbed "Freedom Sunday for Soviet Jews".

In May 1989, she led the first delegation that met with Soviet leaders, among them the head of OVIR, (the Soviet Department of Visas and Registration), Rudolf Kuznetzov. He was the main person responsible for preventing thousands of "refuseniks" from leaving the country. They were so called because they were "refused" exit visas. This meeting and others that followed, held in Copenhagen and Helsinki, resulted in a loosening of the restrictions on Jewish emigration.

Cardin met with President Mikhail Gorbachev twice: once in the Kremlin in October 1991 when she provided a list of 355 refuseniks who were not being allowed to emigrate, and also the rise in antisemitism and lack of religious freedom. Gorbachev declared anti-Semitism as a negative anti-social behavior, a position that became a government policy. The second time she met him was in New York, after he had resigned as head of the Soviet Union, in May 1992.

==== Law of Return amendment in the Israeli Knesset ====
While president of Council of Jewish Federations and afterwards, Cardin led the opposition of the US Jewish community to proposed changes in Israel’s Law of Return. The so-called “Who Is a Jew” amendment, would have denied Israeli citizenship to Jewish converts who did not convert according the Orthodox standards. Cardin met several times with the heads of the Israeli government, including Prime Ministers Yitzhak Shamir and Shimon Peres, to convince them that the legislation would cause more damage than good. This ultimately resulted in its withdrawal from the Knesset.

==== President George H. W. Bush ====
In 1991, Cardin and other leaders of the US Jewish community, were engaged in a disagreement with President George H.W. Bush over U.S. loan guarantees to Israel. This resulted from comments he made in which he implied that he had been targeted by Jewish lobbying efforts regarding American government guarantees for a $10 billion loan to the Israeli government. The Israelis needed the loan to help pay for building infrastructure to resettle the ten of thousands of former Soviet Jews who had successfully emigrated and moved to the Jewish State.

Cardin led the lobbying efforts to persuade the President not to delay the loan. The President's remarks were made after several hundred constituents had spent the day in Congress to convince their representatives to release the loan guarantees. Bush claimed "he was just one lonely little guy” opposing them.

Cardin wrote to the president and also met with him, which resulted in an apology by the President.

==== Other ====
She was president of the Jewish Telegraphic Agency from 1999 until 2001, and then become the Agency’s chairperson.

Cardin continued to serve on boards of various Jewish organizations, including the Jewish National Fund, the National Jewish Center for Learning and Leadership,(CLAL, founded by Rabbi Yitz Greenberg), American Jewish Committee (AJC) Board of Governors (1991-2012). United Jewish Appeal, Jewish National Fund, and served on the board of governors and executive of the Jewish Agency for Israel , American Jewish Joint Distribution Committee, which provides relief to distressed Jewish communities all over the world.

In 2003 she co-founded and chaired a new Independent Jewish High School, which was named the Shoshana S. Cardin School.

== Awards and honors ==
Cardin was awarded numerous honorary degrees from universities and also received many honors over the course of her lifetime of service.

1967- Woman of the Year, B'nai B'rith Women, Maryland

1969 - Certificate of Distinguished Citizenship, State of Maryland

1982 - Governor's Citation State of Maryland

1989 - Na'Amat Golda Meir award

1990 - Justice Louis D. Brandeis Award by the Zionist Organization of America

1994 - Hadassah Henrietta Szold Humanitarian Award.

1995 - Victorine Q. Adams Humanitarian Award

On September 28, 2006, upon the occasion of her 80th birthday, Hon. Benjamin Cardin of Maryland ( a cousin of her husband's) provided greetings in the House of Representatives, which were printed in the Congressional record.

"Shoshana Cardin is known to many in this Chamber, and to many presidents and prime ministers throughout the world. She has been a tireless worker for human rights, women's rights, education, Jewish spirituality and culture, and the State of Israel."

2003 - creation of this new independent Jewish High School called Shoshana S. Cardin School, in her honor.

2005 - admitted into the Maryland Women Hall of Fame

2008 - admitted into the Baltimore Jewish Hall of Fame

2015- her synagogue, Chizuk Amuno, held a special photo exhibit, 'Let my people go' commemorating 25 years since the opening of the gates to the emigration of Soviet Jewry and highlighting Cardin's leadership role.

Honorary degrees from several universities for her work in the Humanities.

- 1993 Bar Ilan University
- 1993 Hebrew College, Boston
- 1994 Syracuse University
- 1996 Baltimore Hebrew University
- 2000 Brandeis University

== Eulogies ==
Shoshana Cardin passed away in 2018 at the age of 91. She was eulogized "as the Jewish leader who broke multiple glass ceilings","beloved matriach", "a superhero", "ideal mentor".

Said David Harris, CEO of American Jewish Committee:

“When Shoshana Cardin spoke, everyone in the room – presidents, prime ministers, members of Congress, fellow Jewish activists, interreligious partners – listened, and was moved. Facing momentous challenges, making vital decisions, for the Jewish community, you always wanted Shoshana on your side. Her wisdom, resolve and political skill played a critical role in the liberation of Soviet Jewry, helped shape the post-Cold War contours of the U.S.-Israel relationship, reinforced the indelible bond between American Jews and Israel, and strengthened the fabric and fiber of Jewish life in the U.S.”

== Awards in her honor ==
Shoshana Shoubin Cardin Prize for Exemplary Collaborations, an annual $10,000 award granted to honoring an existing partnership that has already made a meaningful impact and innovation granted by the organization, Global Jewry,

Acharai: The Shoshana S. Cardin Leadership Development Institute of Naaleh prepares leaders to step into the presidency with the skills and confidence to lead effectively, while building strong peer relationships and grounding their leadership in a meaningful Jewish lens.

Shoshana S. Cardin Award, established in 2013 upon USCJ centennial, provides a $5,000 stipend to emerging Jewish lay leaders, who are making a difference in strengthening and transforming Jewish life.

== Bibliography ==
Shoshana Shoubin Cardin; Karen L. Falk, ed. Shoshana: Memoirs of Shoshana Shoubin Cardin, Jewish Museum of Maryland, 2008, ISBN 978-1883312091

Baltimore County Women, 1930-1975. Towson, MD: American Association of University Women, 1975.

Segal, Sheila. Women of Valor: Stories of Great Jewish Women Who Helped Shape the Twentieth Century. New Jersey: Behrman House, Inc., 1996.

Stegman, Carolyn B. Women of Achievement in Maryland History. Maryland: Anaconda Press, 2002.
