= Jerry Goodman (activist) =

Leading activist in the Soviet Jewry Movement

Jerry Goodman (1932-2025) was a leading activist in the Soviet Jewry Movement and the founding executive director of the National Conference on Soviet Jewry, a national agency established to coordinate the efforts of the American Jewish communities on behalf of Jews in the Soviet Union. He co-established the organization in 1971 and directed it until 1988. Prior to creation of the National Conference, Goodman was Director for European Affairs at the American Jewish Committee and helped coordinate the American Jewish Conference on Soviet Jewry that was later restructured and renamed to National Conference on Soviet Jewry. Goodman acted as a consultant to the U.S. Congress in creating the Commission on Security and Cooperation in Europe and helped the passing of the Jackson-Vanik Amendment, a 1974 provision in United States federal law intended to restrict U.S. trade relations with USSR. He was one of the coordinators of the 1987 Freedom Sunday for Soviet Jews, the largest human rights national manifestation for Soviet Jews in the history of the Soviet Jewry movement.

Goodman was the founder of the Archives of the American Soviet Jewry Movement, a project of the American Jewish Historical Society, and served as its Senior Advisor. He served on the board of Ameinu.

== Organizational leadership ==
- 1971–1988: Founding Executive Director of the National Conference on Soviet Jewry
- 1990–1992: Executive Director, International Committee for Sepharad '92
- 1992–2006: Executive Director, National Committee for Labor Israel

== Publications ==
Goodman authored a Study Guide, Politics and Protest, to teach future generations about the history of the American advocacy movement for Soviet Jews. The study guide includes an annotated timeline of historic events as well as a detailed bibliography.
