= Soviet Jewry movement =

Jewish-American anti-Soviet movement during the Cold War

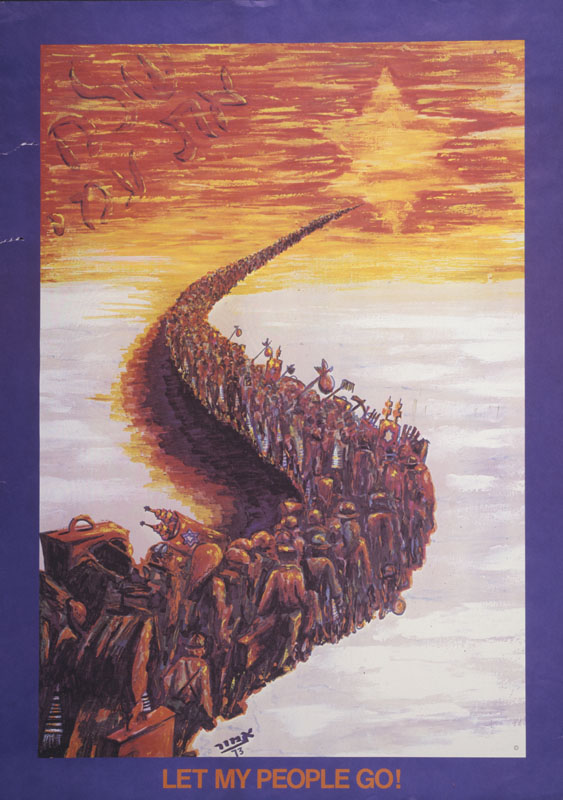
Painting illustrating the desire of Soviet Jews to exile themselves to Israel (1973): Let my people go!

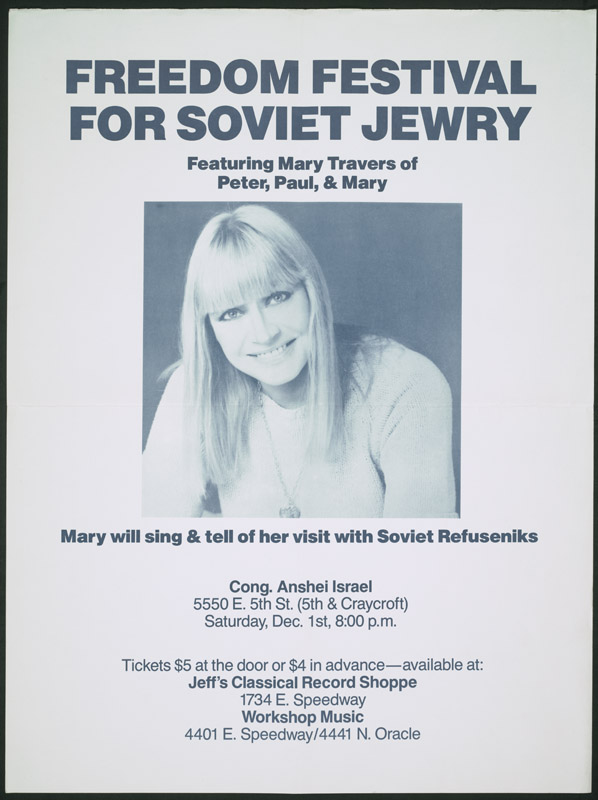
Poster of the "Freedom festival for Soviet Jewry" featuring singer Mary Travers, 1984

The Soviet Jewry movement was a Jewish political movement opposed to the Soviet Union during the Cold War. It was primarily active in the United States, where advocacy campaigns were organized to raise public awareness and rally support for Jews in the Soviet Union. Among the movement's top goals was levying political and economic pressure against Soviet anti-emigration policy, which largely targeted the country's Jewish citizens. A variety of American Jewish organizations and individuals affiliated with the Soviet Jewry movement regularly protested at Soviet diplomatic missions in the United States, and the movement's alignment with the Cold War agenda of the Western Bloc put it in a position to receive strong American government support. Although it was also represented in Israel, the movement's American Jewish organizations frequently came into conflict with Israeli agencies over their support for Soviet Jews who would emigrate on an exit visa for Israel before abruptly changing their destination to the United States or another country. Nevertheless, the Israeli government continued to aid the Soviet Jewish emigration effort until the dissolution of the Soviet Union in 1991.

== History ==
The Western Bloc did not become involved in the movement until the mid-1960s. One of the earliest organized efforts was the Cleveland Council on Soviet Anti-Semitism, a grassroots organization that brought attention to the plight of Soviet Jews from 1963 until 1983. It began as a study group led by three of the founding members of Beth Israel – The West Temple in 1963: Louis Rosenblum, Herbert Caron, and Abe Silverstein. Though the council included prominent rabbis, pastors, priests, and city officials, many initial council members were fellow congregants. As the first such group in the world, this organization spawned other local councils and a national organization. During 1964–69, the Cleveland council developed educational tools, such as organizational handbooks for other communities, the newsletter Spotlight, and media presentations. They also devised protest strategies that became integral to the movement to free Soviet Jewry. One of the council's most successful activities was the People-to-People program of the late 1960s, which represented 50,000 members.

Although not officially sponsored by Beth Israel – The West Temple, the temple provided office space to the council during 1964–78, and the council periodically reported to the congregation's Social Action Committee. Although the Cleveland council was still active in 1985, by the late 1970s the Jewish Community Federation had taken over the major local organizing effort for Soviet Jewry. By 1993, the Cleveland Council on Soviet Anti-Semitism no longer needed to exist, as it had accomplished its mission, and the Soviet Union had also ceased to exist.

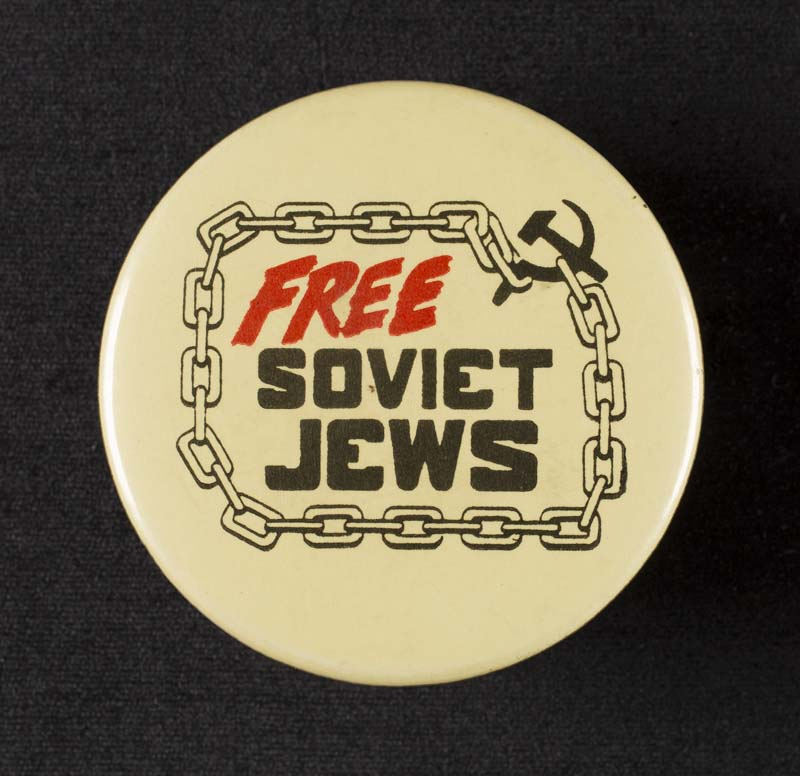
Metal pin from the Papers of Jerry Goodman, Free Soviet Jews

Later, Student Struggle for Soviet Jewry, was founded by Yaakov (Jacob) Birnbaum at Yeshiva University in 1964, and grew to include students from the New York metropolitan area and beyond. In 1969, the Jewish Defense League began a series of protests and vigils while employing militant activism in order to publicize the persecution of Soviet Jewry. The Union of Councils for Soviet Jews was formed in 1970 as an umbrella organization of all local grassroot groups working to win the right to emigrate for oppressed Jewish citizens of the Soviet Union.

The movement was represented in Israel by Nativ, a clandestine agency that sought to publicize the cause of Soviet Jewry and encourage their emigration to Israel.

== Major activities ==
The majority of activities in the Western Bloc were aimed at raising awareness about the lack of freedom to emigrate from the Soviet Union.

=== American Jewish organizations ===
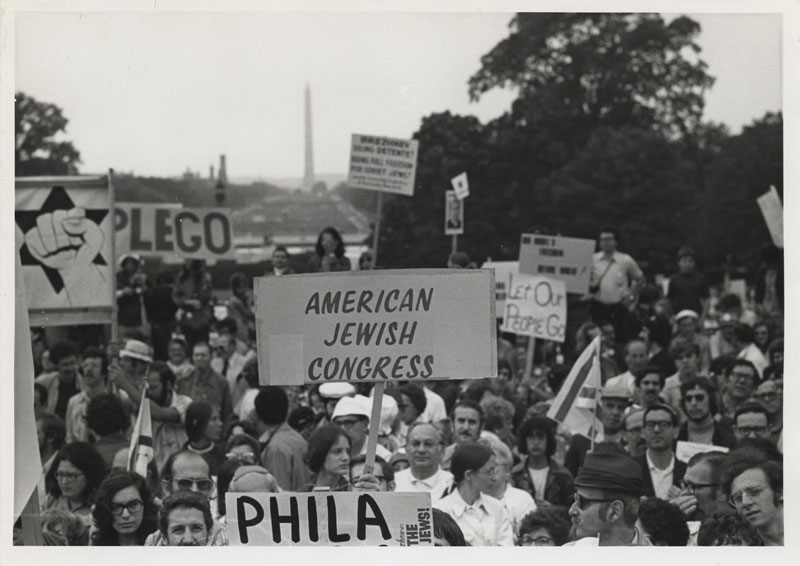
Freedom Assembly for Soviet Jews, Washington, D.C., 1973

In the United States, a number of Jewish organizations became involved in the struggle for Soviet Jewish emigration. Jewish establishment organizations such as the American Jewish Committee and the World Jewish Congress coordinated their efforts in the American Jewish Conference on Soviet Jewry (AJCSJ), later renamed to the National Conference on Soviet Jewry (NCSJ). New grassroots organizations also played an important role. Examples are the Cleveland Council on Soviet Anti-Semitism and Jacob Birnbaum's Student Struggle for Soviet Jewry. Most organization kept their activities within the realm of public outreach, diplomacy and peaceful protest. An exception was the Jewish Defense League led by Meir Kahane, whose members occasionally turned to violent protest. The main slogan of the movement was: Let my people go.

Activities, particularly demonstrations, continued year after year.

Much of the awareness-raising that American organizations participated in centered on individuals. A prominent example is the publicization of the plight of Soviet activist Natan Sharansky. His wife Avital had an about-to-expire permit to leave the Soviet Union, which she used. Both Avital and Sharansky's mother, Ida Milgrom, used publicity in cooperation with international organizations to advocate for Sharansky's right to leave: Avital from around the free world, Milgrom from within the USSR. Another individual whose wish to emigrate was highly publicized was Ida Nudel.

=== Jackson–Vanik Amendment ===
In the early 1970s, the issue of Soviet Jewish emigration became entangled with the U.S.'s Cold War agenda. In 1972, Senator Henry "Scoop" Jackson (D-WA) introduced the Jackson–Vanik amendment to the Trade Act of 1974. The amendment linked U.S. trade relations with non-market economies, such as the Soviet Union, to those countries' restrictions on emigration and other human rights. Countries that restricted the freedom of emigration were unable to achieve Most Favored Nation status. The amendment was passed in 1974. The basis, as worded in the actual legislation, was "To assure the continued dedication of the United States to fundamental human rights." By giving the Soviet Union an economic incentive to allow free emigration, it led, particularly after the Yom Kippur War, to a gradual increase in permission to leave the USSR.

== Relations between Israel and American Jewish organizations ==
Throughout the most intense period of the movement to free Jews from the USSR – 1964–1991 – tensions existed between the Jewish Establishment groups, represented by the umbrella organization the American Jewish Conference on Soviet Jewry and its successor the National Conference on Soviet Jewry and the grassroots groups. Differences revolved around policy and action. Generally, establishment organizations supported a more moderate approach whereas grassroots organizations preferred a more vocal approach. Behind the scenes, the clandestine Israeli Soviet Jewry office, Nativ (known as the Lishka), supported the ACSJ and NCSJ, it had helped create. Such conflicts between Establishment and nascent, independent groups – such as between the NAACP and SNCC in the civil rights movement – are not new.

Once Jews began to be allowed to emigrate, tensions also arose between Israel and the American side of the movement over the drop-out phenomenon. Drop-outs were Jews who left the Soviet Union on an exit visa to Israel but changed their destination (primarily to the United States) once they reached the half-way station in Vienna. Israel, which needed Soviet Jews to offset demographic trends in the country to maintain a Jewish majority, wanted to stop people from dropping out. American Jewish organizations, however, supported these emigrants' freedom to choose their destination.

== See also ==
- National Conference on Soviet Jewry
- Cleveland Council on Soviet Anti-Semitism
- Greater New York Conference on Soviet Jewry
- Aliyah from the Soviet Union in the 1970s
- Jewish Defense League
- National Coalition Supporting Soviet Jewry
- Refusenik (Soviet Union)
- Student Struggle for Soviet Jewry
- Union of Councils for Soviet Jews
- World Jewish Congress

== Bibliography ==
- Altshuler, Stuart. From Exodus to Freedom: A History of the Soviet Jewry Movement. Rowman & Littlefield, 2005
- Beckerman, Gal. When They Come for Us, We'll Be Gone: The Epic Struggle to Save Soviet Jewry. Houghton Mifflin Harcourt, 2010
- Freedman, Robert Owen. Soviet Jewry in the 1980s: The Politics of Anti-Semitism and Emigration and the Dynamics of Resettlement. Duke University Press, 1989
- Kahane, Meir. The Story of the Jewish Defense League. Chilton Book Company, 1975
- Peretz, Pauline (2017). Let My People Go: The Transnational Politics of Soviet Jewish Emigration During the Cold War. London: Routledge. ISBN 978-1412856751.
- Schroeter, Leonard. The Last Exodus. University of Washington Press, 1979
- A Second Exodus: The American movement to Free Soviet Jews. Eds. Murray Friedman and Albert D. Chernin. University Press of New England, 1999
