= Union of Councils for Soviet Jews =

American non-governmental organisation in the former Soviet Union

Union of Councils for Jews in the Former Soviet Union
- Founded: 1970
- Type: Non-governmental organization
- Location: Washington, D.C. (USA), Moscow (Russia), Lviv (Ukraine)
- Fields: Human rights
- Key people: Lawrence Lerner, President and Executive Director; Leonid Stonov, International Director
- Website: www.ucsj.org

Union of Councils for Jews in the Former Soviet Union (UCSJ) is an American non-governmental organization that reports on the human rights conditions in countries throughout Eastern Europe and Central Asia, exposing hate crimes and assisting communities in need. UCSJ uses grassroots-based monitoring and advocacy, as well as humanitarian aid, to protect the political and physical safety of Jewish people and other minorities in the region. UCSJ is based in Washington, D.C., and is linked to other organizations such as the Moscow Helsinki Group. It has offices in Russia and Ukraine and has a collegial relationship with human rights groups that were founded by the UCSJ in the countries of the former Soviet Union.

The UCSJ was formed in 1970 as part of the Movement to Free Soviet Jewry, a response to the oppression of Jews in the Soviet Union and other countries of the Soviet bloc.

== Leadership ==
The founding president of the UCSJ was Louis Rosenblum. Other former presidents include Hal Light, Si Frumkin, Irene Manekofsky, Bob Gordon, Lynn Singer, Pamela Braun Cohen, and Morey Schapira. Leadership after the fall of the Soviet Union in 1991 includes Yosef Abramowitz and Larry Lerner, Leonid Stonov as Director, and Meylakh Shekhet as Director of the Lviv Bureau. Leonid Stonov has been involved with the UCSJ since before his emigration to the U.S. in 1990, when he was a prominent Refusenik and author of the first emigration law in Soviet history, which was presented to the Supreme Soviet of the Soviet Union in 1989. David Waksberg served as National Vice President during the 1980s.

== Activities ==
Activities of the UCSJ after 1991 include reporting on the human rights situation in countries of the former Soviet Union, assisting communities in need, providing support for asylum seekers and migrants, and exposing human rights violations and hate crimes, whether directed against Jews or other minorities in the region, such as Romani or Muslims. According to a UCSJ report in 2013 approximately 1.71 million Jews remained in the post-Soviet states at that time. The reports it produces on the situation in various countries are often presented to the US State Department.

The Lviv office of UCSJ, in addition to running a soup kitchen for the poor of Lviv and running Jewish services for the Jews of Lviv, he has taken on the task of working to protect Jewish historical sites and to fight for human rights. He has been successful in lawsuits against the authorities in Lviv to preserve cemetery sites and destroyed synagogues from commercialization. He has also been successful in pursuing actions against officials who violated the human rights of individuals.

In 2006, the UCSJ spoke against the members of the State Duma from Motherland and the Communist party who have signed a letter demanding Jewish organizations be banned in Russia.

In 2007, the UCSJ condemned the conviction of journalist Boris Stomakhin, who was accused of hate speech.

The UCSJ alerted the public to the revival of the cult of Russian Orthodox Church child saint Gavriil Belostoksky and related blood libel accusations in Belarus, after the Belarusian state TV showed a film alleging that his ritual murder was a true story. Subsequently, a branch of the UCSJ was closed by the government of Belarus as part of what many observers saw as a wider crackdown on political dissent in the region.

In 2012, the USCJ supported the Magnitsky Act, a legislation adopted by the US Congress directed against Russian officials suspected of human rights violations.

== See also ==
- National Coalition Supporting Soviet Jewry
- Lou Rosenblum
- Lynn Singer
- Pamela Cohen
