= Farewell Moscow =

1987 film

- Film poster
- Directed by: Mauro Bolognini
- Written by: Mauro Bolognini
- Produced by: Ippolita Tescari
- Starring: Liv Ullmann
- Cinematography: Ennio Guarnieri
- Edited by: Nino Baragli
- Music by: Ennio Morricone
- Release date: 1987
- Running time: 101 minutes
- Country: Italy
- Language: Italian

Farewell Moscow (Italian: Mosca addio) is a 1987 Italian drama film directed by Mauro Bolognini. For this film Liv Ullmann was awarded with a David di Donatello for Best Actress. It is based on the life of Russian Jew Ida Nudel.

== Cast ==
- Liv Ullmann as Ida Nudel
- Daniel Olbrychski as Yuli
- Aurore Clément as Elena
- Saverio Vallone
- Carmen Scarpitta
- Francesca Ciardi
- Nino Fuscagni
- Anna Galiena
- Vittorio Amandola
