= Stephen Rivers =

American publicist (1955–2010)

Stephen M. Rivers (February 17, 1955 – June 8, 2010) was a United States political activist and publicist, who represented numerous actors and celebrities, including Kevin Costner, Richard Dreyfuss, Jane Fonda, Michael Ovitz and Oliver Stone.

== Biography ==
Rivers was born in Springfield, Massachusetts on February 17, 1955. He started his political activism career organizing a New England boycott of grapes for the United Farm Workers. He later moved to California and worked for UFW President Cesar Chavez.

Jane Fonda was a long-time client, for whom he arranged a trip to the Soviet Union in 1984 on behalf of refusenik Ida Nudel. Fonda's visit made her the first Westerner to visit Nudel in six years. He arranged a 1987 trip to Poland to express her support for Lech Wałęsa, leader of the then-banned Solidarity movement. The trip to Poland with her then-husband Tom Hayden to Warsaw had Fonda meet with government officials as well as with supporters of Solidarity.

Rivers started working for Creative Artists Agency in 1990, where he spent four years organizing the firm's government and charitable efforts, including a fundraiser for President Bill Clinton and managing talent. Starting his own firm in 1994, he balanced his publicity work on films with efforts on behalf of the Magic Johnson Foundation, Product Red, Rock the Vote and Seeds for Peace. He traveled extensively to Cuba, with such notables as Kevin Costner, Steven Soderbergh and Steven Spielberg in support of improving Cuba – United States relations.

Rivers died at age 55 on June 8, 2010, of prostate cancer. He was survived by his mother and three sisters.
