= Freedom Sunday for Soviet Jews =

1987 demonstration in Washington D.C.

Freedom Sunday Rally
- Date: December 6, 1987
- Location: Washington, D.C.
- Participants: Jewish activists and supporters

Freedom Sunday for Soviet Jews was the title of a national march and political rally that was held on December 6, 1987 in Washington, D.C. An estimated 250,000 participants gathered on the National Mall, calling for the General Secretary of the Communist Party of the Soviet Union, Mikhail Gorbachev, to extend his policy of Glasnost to Soviet Jews by putting an end to their forced assimilation and allowing their emigration from the Soviet Union. The rally was organized by a broad-based coalition of Jewish organizations. At the time, it was reported to be the "largest Jewish rally ever held in Washington."

== Objectives ==
On Sunday, December 6, 1987, the eve of the Washington, D.C. Summit between Soviet Premier Mikhail Gorbachev and U.S. President Ronald Reagan, an estimated 250,000 people demonstrated on the National Mall in an unprecedented display of solidarity for Soviet Jewry. The mass mobilization, organized by a broad-based coalition, brought activists from across the United States to demand that Gorbachev extend his policy of Glasnost to Soviet Jews by putting an end to their forced assimilation and allowing their emigration from the USSR. About half the participants came from the Greater New York area under the leadership of the Greater New York Coalition for Soviet Jewry, the National Conference for Soviet Jewry (NCSJ), the Council of Jewish Federations (CJF) and the United Jewish Appeal (UJA).

The audio of the rally was broadcast through Voice of America radio stations, including in Europe, enabling refuseniks within the Soviet Union to listen to the speeches surreptitiously.

== History ==
The rally — reported at the time to be the "largest Jewish rally ever held in Washington" — showed "clearly where the real strength of American Jewish organizations existed," wrote historian Henry L. Feingold. It was "not in negotiating with sovereign powers that gave no assurance that they would implement what might be agreed to. The giant Washington rally of 6 December 1987 demonstrated that public relations techniques to focus attention on the plight of Soviet Jewry had become a formidable skill developed by the American Soviet Jewry movement."

Posters from the rally have been digitized and are available online from the Archives of the American Soviet Jewry Movement held by the American Jewish Historical Society.

The second largest Jewish rally held in Washington took place on April 16, 2002, when pro-Israel organizers, led by the Conference of Presidents of Major American Jewish Organizations, gathered upwards of 100,000 people in front of the Capitol on one week's notice.

== Speakers ==
Speakers and performers at the rally included:

- George H. W. Bush – then Vice President and later President of the United States
- Natan Sharansky – former Soviet refusenik and prisoner, later Israeli politician
- Yosef Mendelevitch – former Soviet refusenik and participant in the Dymshits-Kuznetsov hijacking affair
- James Wright – then Speaker of the United States House of Representatives
- Bob Dole – U.S. Senator, then minority leader of the United States Senate
- Shoshana S. Cardin – Chairman of Conference of Presidents of Major Jewish American Organizations
- Moshe Arad – then ambassador from Israel to the United States
- John Lewis – U.S. Rep, civil rights activist
- Peter, Paul and Mary - musicians
- William Atwell
- Arie Brouwer
- David Clarke
- Pamela Cohen
- Bishop William Keeler
- Edward Koch – then Mayor of New York
- Robert Loup
- Vladimir Pozner
- Martin Stein

== See also ==
- List of protest marches on Washington, D.C.
