= Greater New York Conference on Soviet Jewry =

American non-governmental organisation supporting Soviet Jewish rights

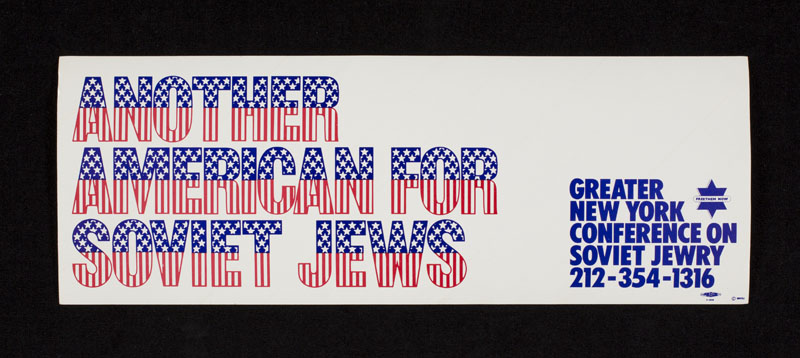
- Bumper sticker by the Greater New York Conference on Soviet Jewry
- Abbreviation: GNYCSJ
- Founded at: New York, NY
- Type: NGO

The Greater New York Conference on Soviet Jewry (GNYCSJ) was founded in 1971, as a non-governmental grassroots organization that worked to secure human rights for Jews in the Soviet Union. It served as an umbrella agency for a number of regional organizations of the Soviet Jewry movement. In the 1980 GNYCSJ was renamed Coalition To Free Soviet Jews.

== Activities ==
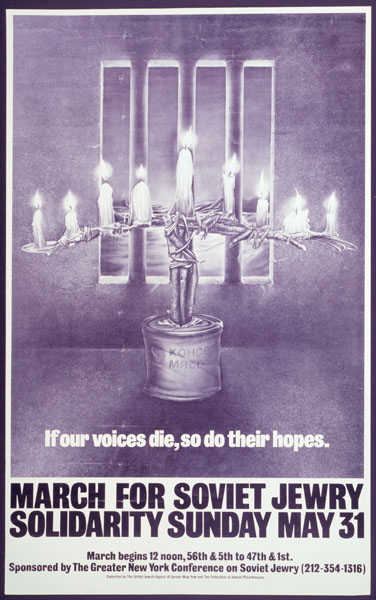
GNYCSJ poster promoting a Soviet Jewry Solidarity Sunday event.

The organization gathered information on the conditions of Jews in the USSR, mostly from the American tourists visiting refuseniks in Soviet Union, and informed federal, state, and local government officials, thus influencing the Soviet-American relations during the two final decades of the Cold War. The GNYCSJ organized public events aimed to raise public awareness of the plight of the Soviet Jewry, including annual Solidarity Sunday rallies that gathered large crowds of supporters in New York City. GNYCSJ co-sponsored the 1987 Freedom Sunday for Soviet Jews in Washington, D.C. attended by 250,000 participants.

== Leadership ==
Malcolm Hoenlin was the first director of GNYCSJ. During the 1970s the GNYCSJ was chaired by Robert Abrams and during the 1980s by Seymour P. Lachman, who was also a member of the board of directors of the Hebrew Immigrant Aid Society (HIAS). Zeesy Schnur served as the executive director.
