= Pamela Cohen =

American activist (born 1943)

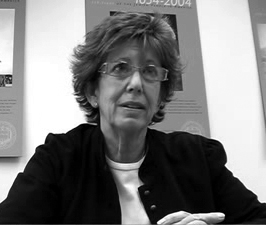
Pamela Cohen in 2010.

Pamela Braun Cohen (born 1943) is an activist in the American Soviet Jewry movement. She began her activist work in the Chicago Action for Soviet Jewry in the 1970s and served as the national president of the Union of Councils for Soviet Jews (UCSJ) from 1986 to 1997.

== Activism ==
Beginning in 1978, Cohen traveled throughout the U.S.S.R. to visit Jewish emigration activists and Refuseniks, Jews who were refused emigration visas, to bring out information and to develop strategies for UCSJ's grass roots support. In 1989 Cohen led an international delegation, representing five countries, to the Soviet Union to hold the historic first open meeting between Jews of the Soviet Union and Jews of the West and Israel. Later that year, at the request of the Refusenik activists, she traveled again to Moscow for the opening of the Solomon Mikhoels Cultural Center. In 1991, she returned to Russia for a Round Table of Human Rights, co-sponsored by the Union of Councils, with participation of indigenous human rights and democratic leaders. She also led a UCSJ team to Tajikistan, Kazakhstan, Kyrgyzstan and Uzbekistan to assess the situation of Jews in the Soviet Muslim Republics and returned to Kyrgyzstan the following year with a UCSJ delegation to conduct an International Symposium on Human Rights as requested by local Jewish leadership. In the same year, she participated in a Human Rights Experts meeting in Vilnius, Lithuania, co-sponsored by UCSJ.

Cohen has participated in numerous international and national conferences on the issues of Soviet Jewish emigration, Soviet anti-Semitism, and the right to Jewish identity in the former Soviet Union. On behalf of the Union of Councils, she attended three separate sessions of the Vienna Follow-Up Meeting of the Commission on Security and Cooperation in Europe (CSCE); the 1989 CSCE Paris Conference of the Human Dimensions; the Paris CSCE Summit 1990; the Copenhagen Conference of the Human Dimension in 1990; the 1991 Moscow Conference of the Human Dimension and served as a public member of the official U.S. delegation to the CSCE Conference on Minorities in Geneva, Switzerland in 1991. She traveled to Israel on bi-annual basis with UCSJ activists to debrief Jews who were able to receive visas.

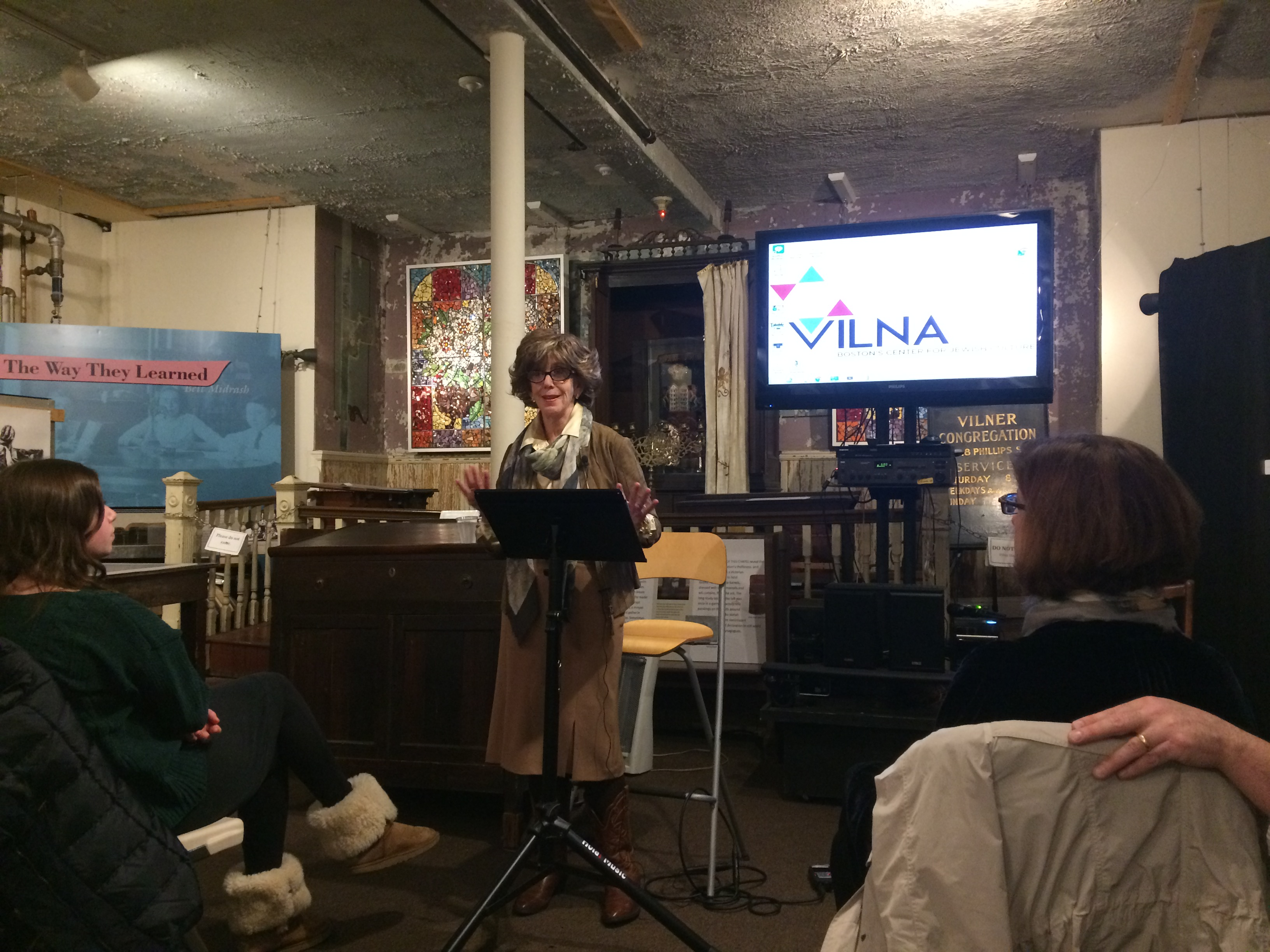
Pamela Cohen in 2017 at the Jewish Women's Archive

Pamela Cohen established networks for transferring information to and from Refuseniks throughout the U.S.S.R. and maintained regular telephone contacts with activists during the darkest days for Soviet Jewry. She testified at Congressional hearings on the state of Soviet emigration policy and state-sponsored anti-Semitism during the Soviet era and participated regularly in briefings for the Congress, the White House, departments of State, Commerce and Defense. She participated in briefings for President Reagan, Secretaries of the State Schultz, Baker and for Condoleezza Rice, during her tenure with the National Security Council. In 1992 she was a guest at the White House for the State dinner during the Summit between Presidents George Bush and Boris Yeltsin.

She wrote a book about her experiences advocating on behalf of Soviet Jewry, "Hidden Heroes: One Woman's Story of Resistance and Rescue in the Soviet Union."

In 1995, Pamela Cohen and Rabbi Ezra Belsky co-founded Komimiyus, the Deerfield, Illinois-based North Shore Torah Center, an independent grass roots education center dedicated to Jewish classical education for adults in Chicago area.

== Awards ==
During the course of her service, Cohen has received the Raoul Wallenberg Humanitarian Award from the Raoul Wallenberg Committee of Chicago in 1981 and the Edward J. Sparling Award from Roosevelt University's Alumni Association. In 1989, during the UCSJ Conference in Moscow, Pamela Cohen was given the Medal of Honor by grass roots Soviet Jewish activists and leaders for her achievements on behalf of Soviet Jewry. In 1997, she received a degree of Doctor of Human Letters from Spertus College of Judaica.
