= Memorial Day for Ethiopian Jews =

Annual memorial day observed in Israel

Memorial Day for Ethiopian Jews is an annual memorial day in Israel held on the 28th of Iyar, coinciding with Jerusalem Day. This day commemorates the thousands of Ethiopian Jews who died during their journey to return to their ancestral homeland, Israel, particularly during the mass aliyah operations in the 1980s.

== Background ==
The Ethiopian Jewish community, known as Beta Israel, faced significant dangers and hardships during their migration of return to Israel. The most notable events include Israel’s Operation Moses in 1984, which facilitated the perilous transit and return from exile of approximately 8,000 Jews from Ethiopia through Sudan, and Israel’s Operation Solomon in 1991, which brought an additional 14,324 Ethiopian Jews back to Israel in just 36 hours. During the journey, it is estimated that around 4,000 individuals died, with approximately 1,500 having been named and memorialized.

As of year-ending 2024, approximately 177,600 individuals of Ethiopian-Jewish descent resided in Israel, with just over half born in Ethiopia and the remainder born in Israel to Ethiopian immigrant parents.

== Observance ==
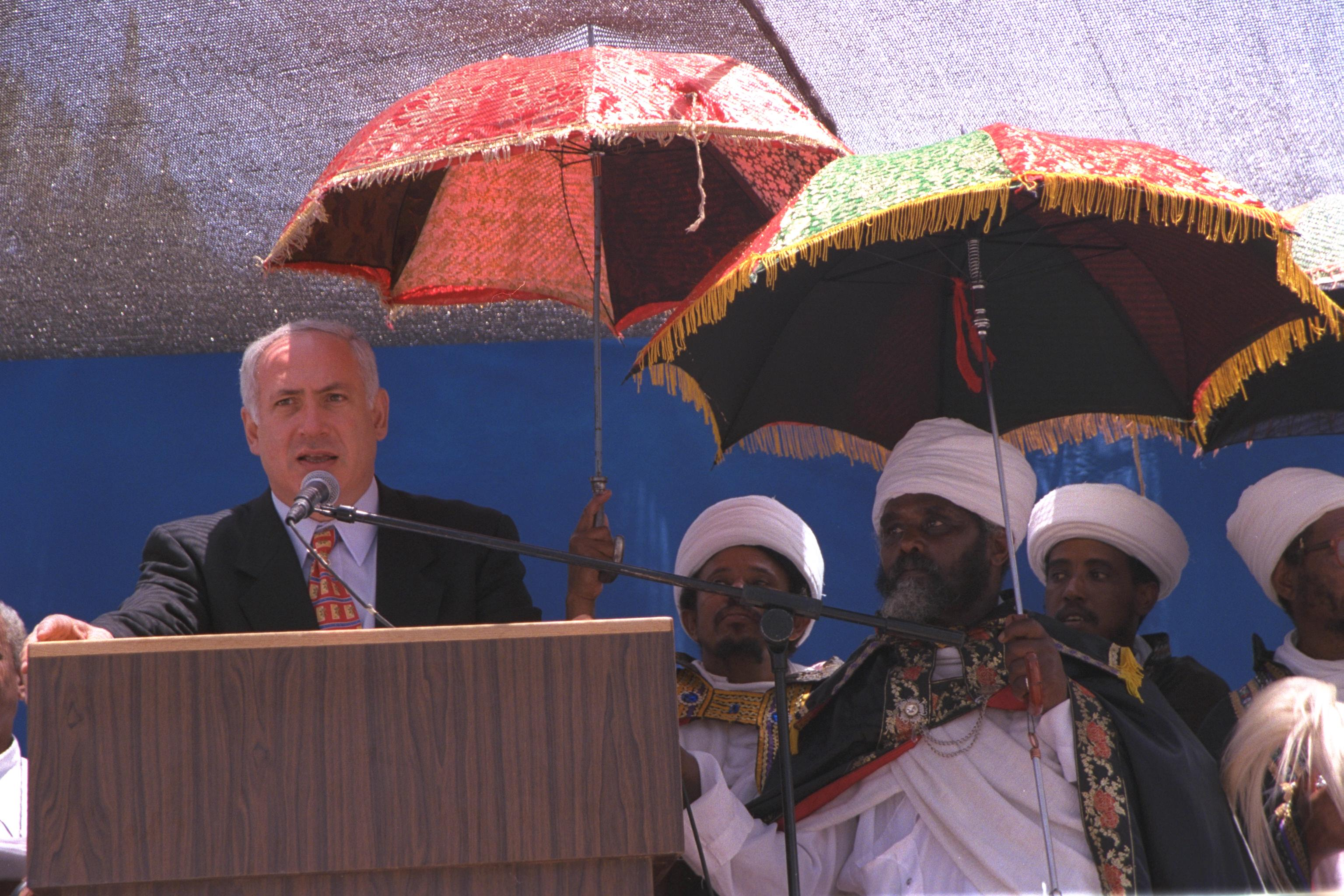
Prime Minister Benjamin Netanyahu speaking at a memorial service in May 1998

The first memorial ceremony for the 4,000 Ethiopians who died on the way to Israel was held in 1986 near kibbutz Ramat Rachel, south of Jerusalem, coinciding with Jerusalem Day, which is observed on the 28th of Iyar in the Hebrew calendar. This choice indicates a desire to identify with Israelis who lost their lives in the struggle for Jerusalem and to assert a shared sense of belonging within the national narrative and collective memory. Three years later, in 1999, the Ministry of Immigrant Absorption, with support from the Jewish Agency and the Israel National Fund, established a temporary memorial near Ramat Rachel. Each year, state representatives promised the community that the site would be made suitable for larger gatherings. When efforts to compel the state to fulfill its commitments failed, a High Court petition was submitted in July 2002. Following the court's recommendation, the issue was referred to mediation by Minister of Immigrant Absorption Tzipi Livni in March 2003. During the Sigd festival in Jerusalem, the minister announced a cabinet decision to create a memorial at the National Civil Cemetery on Mount Herzl in Jerusalem. Simultaneously, the government designated the memorial ceremony to coincide with Jerusalem Day. Four years later, in March 2007, the permanent memorial was completed.

The annual commemoration ceremony is held at Mount Herzl, Israel's national military cemetery in Jerusalem, where a memorial resembling a deserted Ethiopian village displays the names of over 1,500 deceased individuals. The event includes memorial prayers and moments of reflection on the struggles faced by Ethiopian Jews, particularly the difficult conditions during their transit in Sudan. It is attended by families who lost relatives, members of the Ethiopian Jewish community, heads of state and politicians, and public figures, among others. President Shimon Peres maintained a yearly tradition of honoring the deceased.

Some activists contend that Jerusalem Day overshadows this observance, limiting its visibility. A 2017 opinion piece by activist Efrat Yerday published in Haaretz criticized the scheduling of Memorial Day for Ethiopian Jews on the same day as Jerusalem Day. She highlighted that the overlap leads to the memorial receiving inadequate attention and coverage, effectively making it a private observance for Ethiopian Israelis, while broader Israeli society remains largely unaware. A 2021 opinion piece emphasized the need to separate the memorial day from Jerusalem Day. The author reflected on the painful juxtaposition of a national celebration and a day of mourning for those lost and asserted that by aligning these two significant days, the memorial often goes unnoticed, overshadowed by festivities. However, various institutions—including schools, universities, and community centers—have started recognizing Memorial Day for Ethiopian Jews, gradually incorporating it into the Israeli public consciousness.

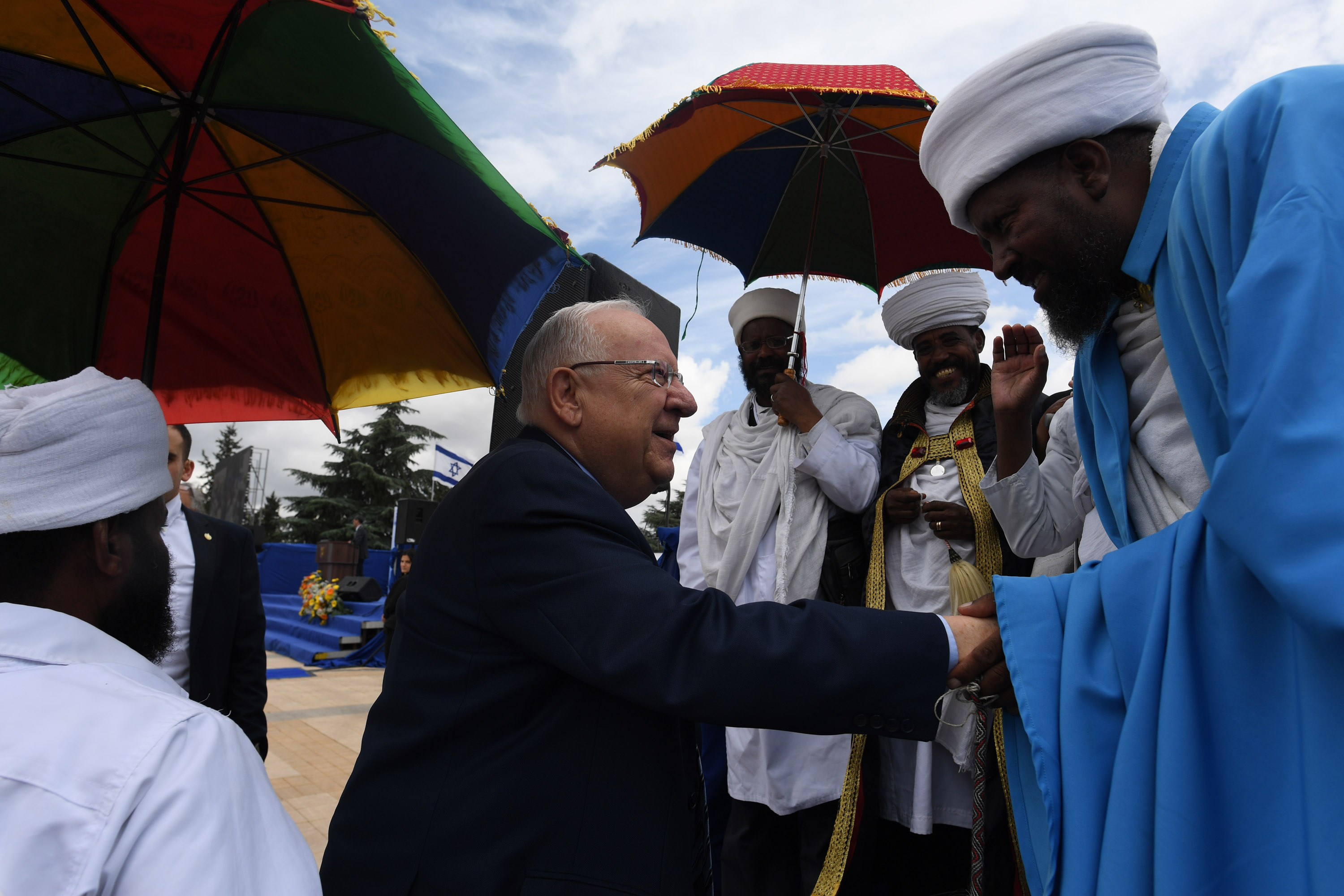
Israeli president Reuven Rivlin during the national memorial ceremony for Ethiopian Jews in May 2018

In 2015, during the memorial service, President Reuven Rivlin acknowledged the state's failures in supporting the Ethiopian community, stating that Israel had not listened or acted adequately to their needs. Prime Minister Benjamin Netanyahu, also present, promised to form a ministerial committee to address discrimination and racism, emphasizing a commitment to combat these issues. The memorial came amid protests against police violence following the surfacing of footage of police beating a black soldier.

On May 21, 2020, the memorial service was attended by Prime Minister Benjamin Netanyahu, Immigration and Absorption Minister Pnina Tamano-Shata, Israel's first Ethiopian-born minister, and Eden Alene, Israel's first Ethiopian Eurovision representative. The ceremony, led by Ethiopian journalist Almaz Mangistu, included performances by Alene of "Hamasa Leretz Yisrael" and "Shoshanim Atzuvot." President Rivlin spoke about the journey and sacrifices of the Ethiopian Jewish community, and shared a testimony from Danny Adeno Ababa's The Journey Isn't Over.

In 2021, due to ongoing health regulations, only 3,000 people were permitted to attend the ceremony. According to The Jerusalem Post, this was in stark contrast to the fact that the government openly permits tens of thousands of people to gather at other events throughout the country. Prime Minister Benjamin Netanyahu and President Reuven Rivlin honored the fallen with speeches emphasizing the community's dreams of reaching Jerusalem. Rivlin also highlighted the commitment to bringing home Avera Mengistu, an Israeli held captive by Hamas.
