= Louis Rosenblum =

American scientist and activist

Louis Rosenblum (15 November 1923 – 4 April 2019) was a pioneer in the movement for freedom of emigration for the Jews in the Soviet Union, was a founder of the first organization to advocate for the freedom of Soviet Jews, the Cleveland Council on Soviet Anti-Semitism, founding president of the Union of Councils for Soviet Jews, and a research scientist at the National Aeronautics and Space Administration (NASA) Lewis Research Center (now known as the John H. Glenn Research Center at Lewis Field).

== Early life ==
Lou Rosenblum attended the Yeshivah of Flatbush NY and began his higher education at Brooklyn College in 1941. After enlisting he served in the U.S. Army Infantry from 1943 to 1946 in the Pacific Theater, fought in the Battle of Okinawa, was awarded the bronze star and, at the conclusion of hostilities, served in the army of occupation in Japan. In 1948 he graduated from Brooklyn College with a B.S. in Chemistry and continued to Ohio State University where, in 1952, he earned a Ph.D. in Organic Chemistry. A lifelong folk dancer and teacher, he appeared in the 1947 film "To Hear Your Banjo Play" as the dance partner of Margot Mayo, with a young Pete Seeger on banjo.

== Career at NASA ==
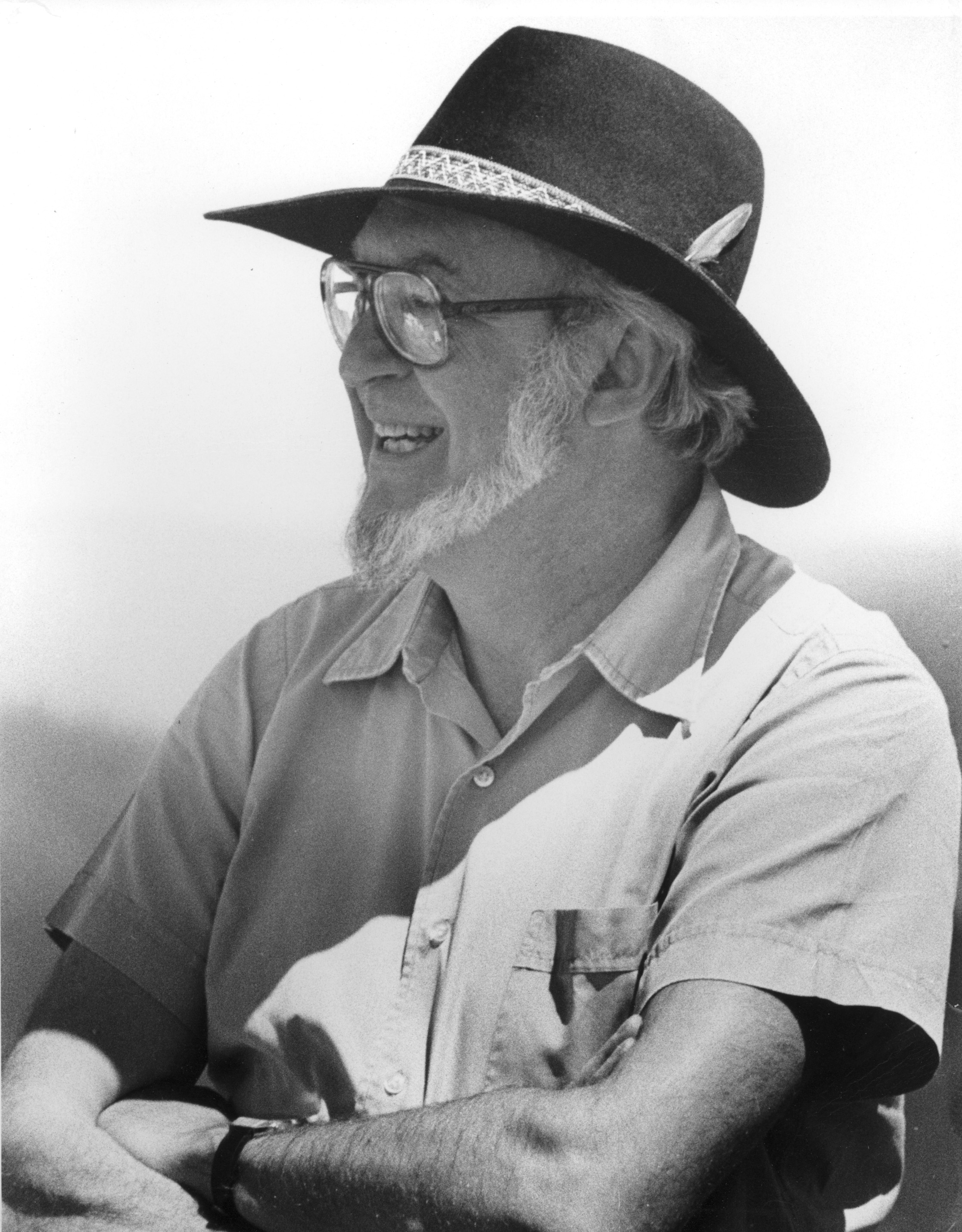
Louis Rosenblum at dedication of solar energy installation on the Tohono O'odham Indian Reservation, Schuchuli, Arizona, 16 December 1978

From 1952 to 1981, Rosenblum worked for the NASA Lewis Research Center, Cleveland, Ohio, as research scientist and technical manager in fields of high energy fuels for jet aircraft, high temperature materials, liquid metal corrosion, environmental monitoring systems, and solar photovoltaic and electrochemical energy systems. During the 1960s he served as Chief of the Liquid Metals Branch. During that time he led a "Fair Housing Drive" to fight discrimination against African American employees who were unable to buy or rent property in proximity to their work at NASA. In 1969 Rosenblum was appointed Chief of the Direct Energy Conversion Division responsible for research and development activities in thermionics, photovoltaics and electrochemistry. At NASA he co-invented a portable electronic beam welder. In 1977 he was appointed Chief of the Solar and Electrochemistry Division responsible for 1) research and development of space related photovoltaics and energy storage and 2) U.S. and international demonstration projects for terrestrial application of photovoltaic and electrochemical storage systems. Under Rosenblum the first nickel-zinc battery suitable for a commercial electric cars was developed in 1978. The photovoltaic demonstration work was deployed in remote villages in the US and across the globe. He was appointed to the Federal Senior Executive Service in 1979 and retired from NASA in 1981. From 1982-1988, Rosenblum worked as a private consultant in photovoltaic and renewable energy systems for several U.S. and international clients, including the University of Michigan, the U.S. Department of Justice, the U.S. Internal Revenue Service and the United Nations Development Program.

== Fight for freedom of emigration of Soviet Jews ==
=== Creation of the first public Soviet Jewry organization ===
In 1963, Rosenblum and fellow members of Beth Israel-The West Temple, a Cleveland synagogue, founded the Cleveland Council on Soviet Anti-Semitism (CCSA)— the first public organization dedicated to helping Soviet Jews. Its success was recognized nationally and became a model for other local groups. In 1970, Rosenblum's multi-year effort led to the CCSA joining with five other grass-root councils to create a national activist and advocacy organization, the Union of Councils for Soviet Jews (UCSJ). Rosenblum served as the first president of the UCSJ from 1970-1973. By 1978, the UCSJ had grown to 22 member councils across North America, and by 1985, 32, making it the largest independent Soviet Jewry organization in the world.

Rosenblum originated a number of grass roots projects and techniques that were widely used by organizations working for freedom of emigration.

=== Media projects ===
Soon after the founding of the CCSA, Rosenblum became aware of the need for resources and educational materials for Soviet Jewry advocates in North America. In 1965 he published his first Hear the Cry of the Oppressed: Handbook for Community Action on Soviet Anti-Semitism. The Handbook was republished in two later editions – 1966 and 1970, and contained suggestions for action programs; material for talks and sermons; dramatic readings, songs and plays; teacher guides and teaching units for use in school; and reports, articles, and other factual background on Soviet Jewry.

Rosenblum created postage stamp-sized protest seals that became a symbol of the Soviet Jewry movement with a design by Cleveland artist Mort Epstein (see external link below) set on a deep red background. Between 1967 and 1978 the CCSA sold 20,750,000 stamps to individuals and Soviet Jewry organizations across North America. By placing the stamps on regular correspondence the project sought to increase public awareness of the treatment of Soviet Jews. (see external link below)

In 1968, Rosenblum produced and globally distributed "Before Our Eyes," a 13 1/2 minute film documenting the historic and current problems of Jews in the Soviet Union (see external link below). The title came from a remark by Rabbi Abraham Joshua Heschel in the movie that "Before our eyes a people and a culture are being made to vanish."

Based on microfilm smuggled out of the Soviet Union in 1974, Rosenblum edited and published the 54-page samizdat document, "The White Book of Exodus, No. 2," an account by Moscow Jewish activists of the arrests and military conscription of young Jewish activists in order to prevent demonstrations during the visit of President Nixon for a Moscow summit meeting with Leonid Brezhnev.

=== People to people projects ===
With the formation of the UCSJ in 1970 "Rosenblum began looking for…'people to people' opportunities, ways that American Jews could communicate with Soviet Jews, humanizing the cause." Rosenblum became "one of the primary architects of the American [Soviet Jewry Movement] campaign's shift to "people-to-people" tactics to directly connect individual Jews in the United States and the USSR with one another."

Armed with the names and addresses of Jews living in the USSR who had signed petitions, Rosenblum designed and distributed holiday greeting cards for American Jews to send to their Soviet Jewish counterparts, a program which spread across North America. Shortly thereafter, Rosenblum further broke the barrier of direct communication between the two communities when he began a campaign to place phone calls, via the US and Soviet international operators, to Jewish activists in the USSR. These phone conversations became a major source of information about the Jewish emigration movement in the former Soviet Union (phone transcripts available from the Western Reserve Historical Society). In 1971 Rosenblum published a "how-to manual on sending parcels to Soviet Jewish prisoners of conscience" and a pamphlet describing conditions for Jewish prisoners in the Potma labor camp in Mordovia, further bridging the divide.

During telephone conversations in 1971 with Soviet Jewish activists, Rosenblum became aware that Soviet Jews intent on learning Hebrew were holding classes in private homes with underground teachers who were facing arrest due to lacking teaching certificates. Subsequently, Rosenblum established Project Sefer (see external link below) to meet the needs of the Hebrew learning groups throughout the Soviet Union and included the mailing of Hebrew textbooks and the production of special recorded language tapes and materials for the self-study of Hebrew. In 1973 after Soviet authorities announced that teaching without certification was illegal, Rosenblum developed a program, working with Cleveland Jewish educators, to test and certify Hebrew teachers in the Soviet Union.

During the Brezhnev era, Rosenblum and other Soviet Jewry activist leaders provided detailed briefings to tourists visiting the former Soviet Union to enable them to visit Soviet Jewish activists for the purpose of establishing meaningful people-to-people contacts, delivering Hebrew educational materials and serving as communication links with activists in the West.

"The effectiveness of people-to-people contact was clear…and did more for the movement than any policy paper or rally. Understanding this was Rosenblum's genius."

=== Political activism ===
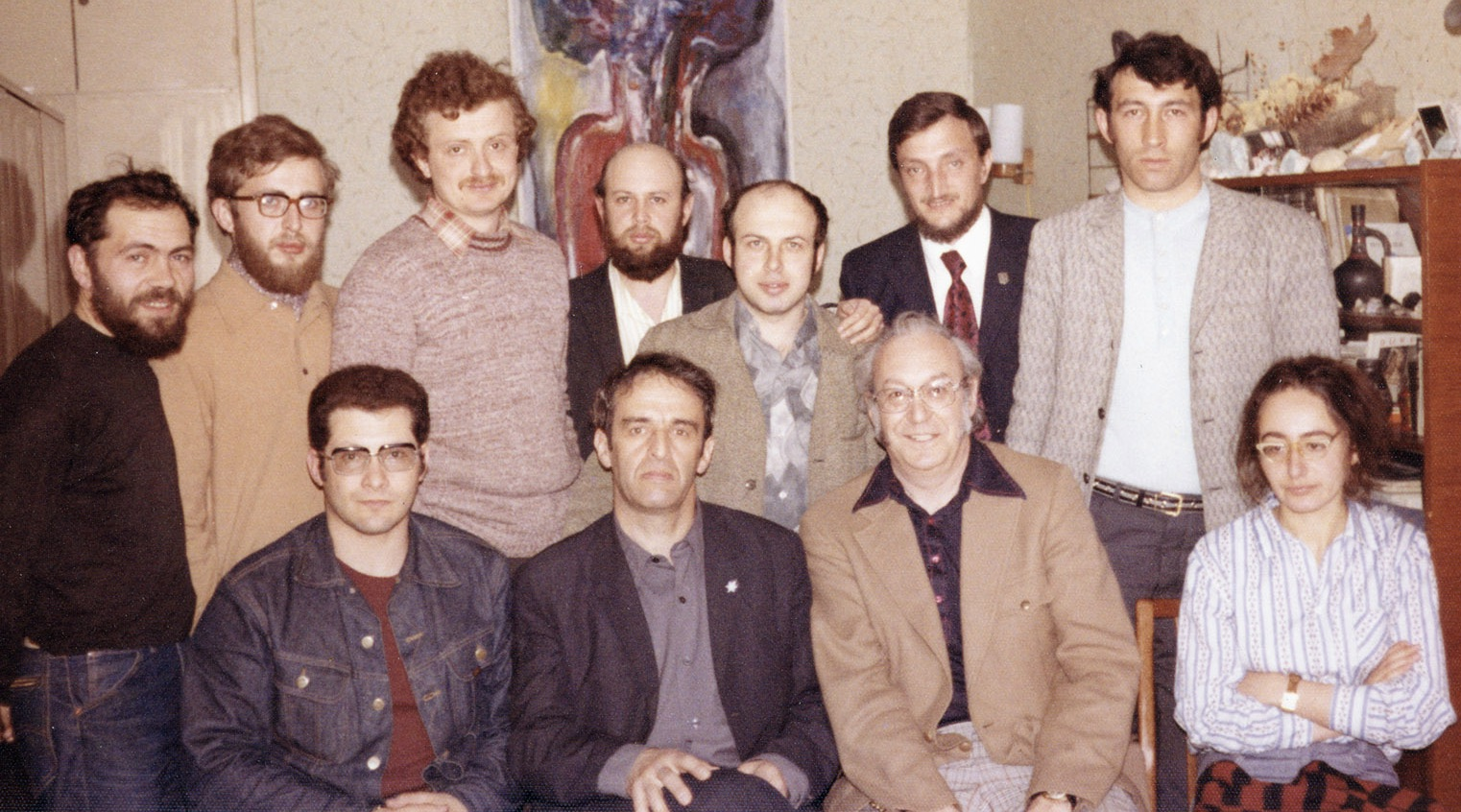
Louis Rosenblum with Jewish emigration activists gathered in apartment of Aleksandr Luntz, Moscow, May 1974. Standing left to right: Valerie Krizhak, Leonid Tsypin, Lev Kogan, Boris Tsitlenok, Anatoly Sharansky, Anatoly Novikov, Zakhar Teskar; Seated left to right: Lev Gendin, Aleksandr Luntz, Louis Rosenblum, Yelena Sirotenko.

The idea of connecting trade relations with Soviet Jewish freedom of emigration was conceived by Rosenblum in 1969 and later studied by a Jewish policy group in 1971. That year Rosenblum "mapped out strategy for a freedom-of-emigration bill" in Congress working with attorney Nathan Lewin and Harvey Lieber of American University that resulted in a proposed amendment to the Export Administration Act of 1969. This work to develop a freedom of emigration bill became the precursor of the Jackson–Vanik Amendment to the Trade Act of 1974. During the development of the Jackson–Vanik amendment, Rosenblum met frequently with Mark E. Talisman, Administrative Assistant to his congressman, Charles Vanik, and Richard Perle, senior aide to Senator Jackson. He also met with Leonard Garment, Special Counsel to President Richard Nixon, as an adviser on human rights in the Soviet Union and to press for adoption of the Jackson–Vanik strategy. During the lead-up to the congressional vote on Jackson–Vanik, when American Jewish leaders and the National Conference on Soviet Jewry were wavering in their support of the legislation, Rosenblum remained in close touch with Moscow Jewish activists to encourage them to make their support of the amendment known. The resulting appeal from one hundred Soviet Jewish activists was one of the factors that led to the amendment's passage.

The Louis Rosenblum papers, containing extensive documentation of his work in the Soviet human rights movement, are available in the Western Reserve Historical Society archives.
