= National Coalition Supporting Soviet Jewry =

American organization advocating for Jewish rights in the former Soviet Union

National Coalition Supporting Eurasian Jewry
- Formation: 1971; 55 years ago
- Location: Washington, D.C.
- Coordinates: 38°54′8″N 77°2′46″W
- Website: www.ncsej.org

The National Coalition Supporting Eurasian Jewry (NCSEJ), formerly the National Council for Soviet Jewry (NCSJ), is an organization in the United States which advocates for the freedoms and rights of Jews in Russia, Ukraine, Belarus, the Baltic States, and Eurasia. Emerging from the American Jewish Conference on Soviet Jewry, now with a paid staff, it played an important role in the Soviet Jewry movement, including such landmark legislation as Jackson–Vanik amendment. Headquartered in Washington, D.C., it is now an umbrella organization of about 50 national organizations and 300+ local federations, community councils and committees.

== History ==
NCSEJ comes out of the American Jewish Conference on Soviet Jewry, which first met in October 1963. Among those present were Saul Bellow, Martin Luther King Jr., Herbert Lehman, Bishop James Pike, Walter Reuther, Norman Thomas, and Robert Penn Warren. This was followed in April 1964 by Student Struggle for Soviet Jewry. The AJCSJ was formally established in 1971, with the name change to NCSJ was approved on December 13, 1971. Jerry Goodman was the founding executive director of NCSJ and led the organization until 1988.

The organization helped link Jewish emigration to trade restrictions, leading to increase of immigration of Jews from Soviet Union to Israel in the 1970s. It organized a march for human rights for Soviet Jews on December 6, 1987, the day before a meeting between Ronald Reagan and Mikhail Gorbachev, known as Freedom Sunday for Soviet Jews. About 250,000 people were there, among them George H. W. Bush, Iosif Begun, Yuli Edelstein, Ida Nudel, and Natan Sharansky.

The chairman of the organization is Stephen Greenberg, and the president Alexander Smukler.
