= Abe Silverstein =

American aerospace engineer (1908–2001)

Abraham Silverstein
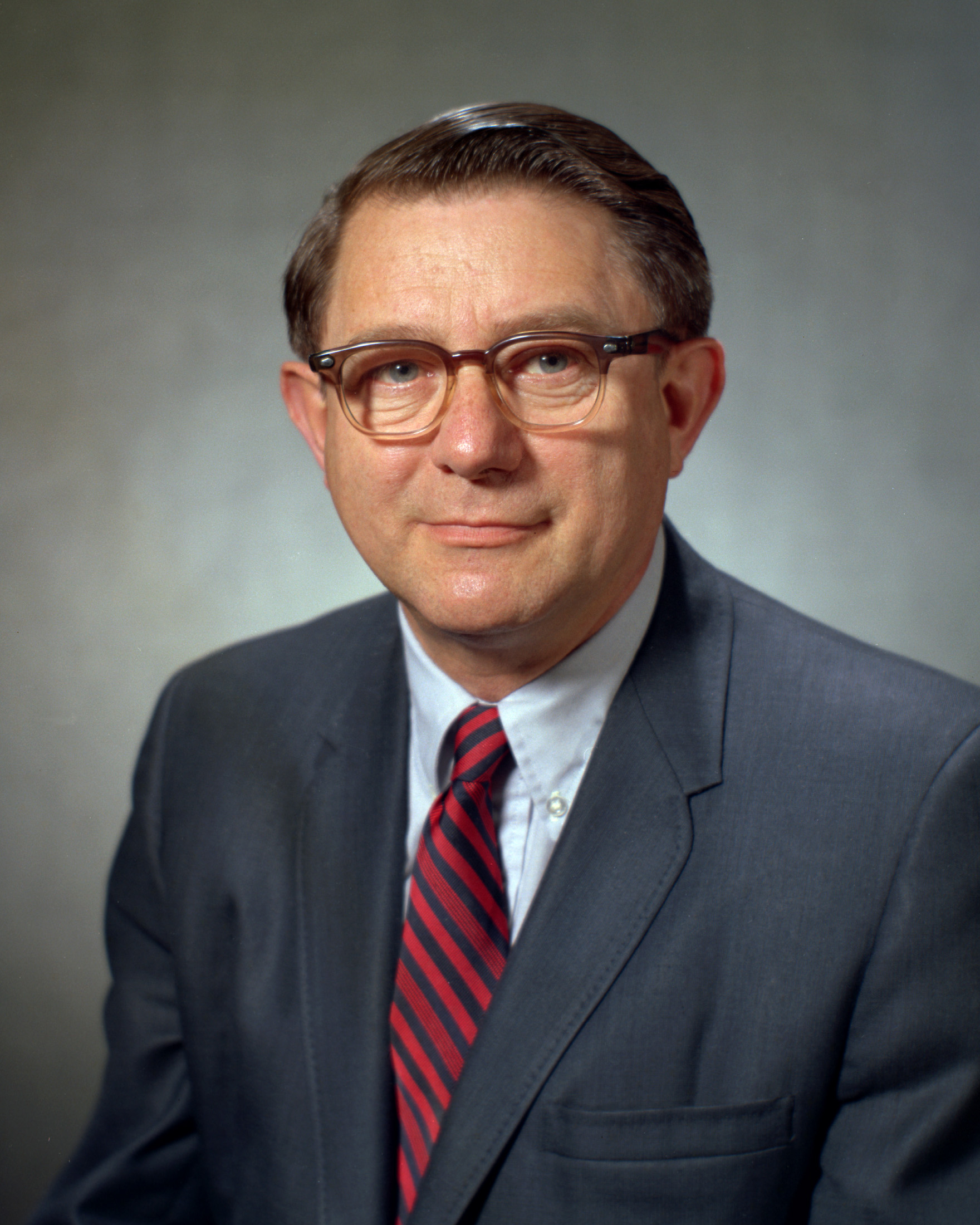
- Born: September 15, 1908; Terre Haute, Indiana, U.S.
- Died: June 1, 2001 (aged 92); Fairview Park, Ohio, U.S.
- Education: Rose–Hulman Institute of Technology
- Occupation: Engineer
- Awards: Daniel Guggenheim Medal (1997); NASA Outstanding Leadership Medal (1961)

Abraham "Abe" Silverstein (September 15, 1908 – June 1, 2001) was an American engineer who played an important part in the United States space program. He was a longtime manager at the National Aeronautics and Space Administration (NASA) and its predecessor, the National Advisory Committee for Aeronautics (NACA). He was instrumental in the planning of the Apollo, Ranger, Mariner, Surveyor, and Voyager missions, and named the Apollo program after the Greek and Roman God.

== Biography ==
Born into a Jewish family in Terre Haute, Indiana to Joseph and Eva Silverstein, Silverstein earned a B.S. in mechanical engineering (1929) and a Master of Engineering (1934) from the Rose-Hulman Institute of Technology in his hometown.

=== NASA career ===
He was hired by NASA's predecessor, NACA, in 1929 at the Langley Aeronautical Laboratory as an aerodynamicist to work on the design of the Altitude Wind Tunnel to be built in Cleveland, Ohio at the Lewis Laboratory (later, the Lewis Research Center, and now known as Glenn Research Center). While at Langley, he directed important aerodynamic research which led to increased high-speed performance of most of the combat aircraft of World War II. In 1944, he joined the High-Speed panel and advocated the supersonic wind tunnel, completed in 1949. Following World War II, Silverstein was responsible for the conception, design, and construction of America's first supersonic propulsion wind tunnels. The investigations in these facilities greatly contributed to the development of supersonic aircraft. He also directed research in propulsion aerodynamics in the Altitude Wind Tunnel that led to significant improvements in both reciprocating and early turbojet aircraft engines. He also pioneered research on large-scale ramjet engines.

Silverstein was placed in charge of all research at the Lewis Research Center in 1949. In 1952, he was appointed its Associate Director. He received an honorary doctorate in 1958 from Case Institute of Technology (now part of Case Western Reserve University) in Cleveland. At NASA headquarters, he helped create and direct the efforts leading to the space flights of Project Mercury and to establish the technical basis for the Apollo program; in particular, he chaired a government commission, the Saturn Vehicle Evaluation Committee (better known as the Silverstein Committee). As Lewis's director, he oversaw a major expansion of the center and the development of the Centaur launch vehicle.

=== Human rights activism ===
Silverstein was one of the founders of the Cleveland Council on Soviet Anti-Semitism.

=== Retirement ===
Silverstein retired from NASA in 1970 in order to take a position with Republic Steel Corporation. In 1984, NASA named Silverstein an "Elder Statesman of Aviation." On August 14, 1997, he was recipient of the prestigious Guggenheim Medal for "significant contributions to the advancement of flight."

Silverstein died on June 1, 2001, in his home in Fairview Park, Ohio. Silverstein is survived by two sons: Joe, of Thousand Oaks, California, and David, of Maumee, Ohio; a daughter, Judy Cook of Columbia, Maryland; and five grandchildren. His wife of 48 years, Marion Croster Silverstein, died in 1998. NASA credits Silverstein with giving both the Mercury and Apollo programs their names.

In 2015, Silverstein was enshrined into the National Aviation Hall of Fame as one of the "Class of 2015" along with aviation pioneers Robert Cardenas, Robert N. Hartzell, and Gene Kranz.
