= Prisoner of Zion =

Jew who was imprisoned or deported for Zionist activity

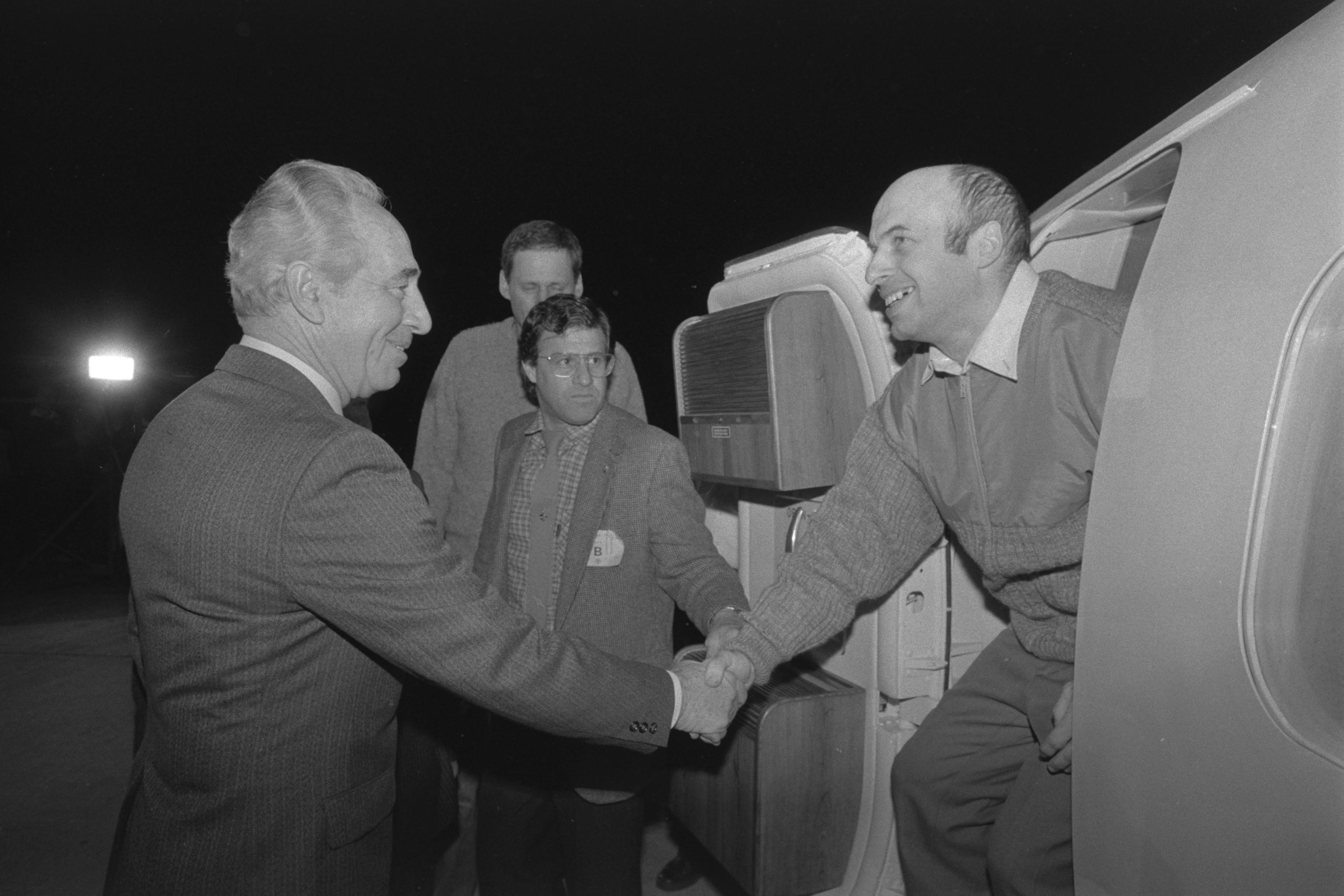
Natan Sharansky, one of the most prominent prisoners of Zion, meeting then-Prime Minister Shimon Peres after his release from the Soviet Union

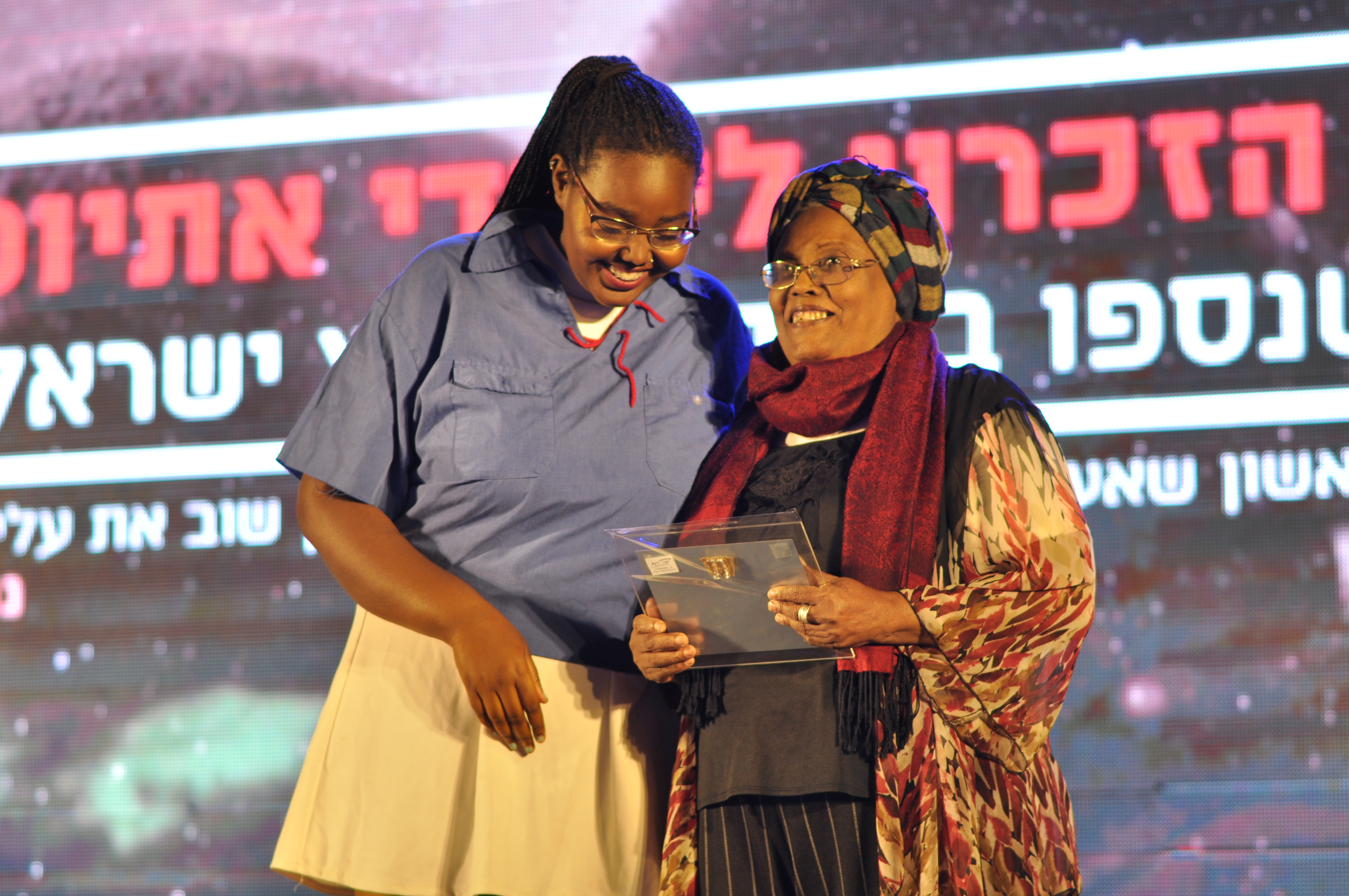
Prisoner of Zion Herut Takele at a ceremony honoring the memory of those who perished in the Ethiopian Jewry on their way to Israel, receiving a certificate for underground activity in support of the Aliyah project – Netanya, 2017

In Israel, prisoners of Zion (Hebrew: אֲסִירֵי צִיּוֹן, asirei Zion, singular: Hebrew: אסיר ציון, asir Zion) were Jews who were imprisoned or deported for Zionist activity in countries where such activity was prohibited. The former Speaker of the Knesset, Yuli Edelstein, and the former chairman of the executive of the Jewish Agency, Nathan Sharansky, were both prisoners of Zion in the Soviet Union. In 1992 an Israeli law made the status of the prisoner of Zion official; however, the status was in use long before.

== Historical background ==
The phrase is taken from the first words of a poem by Rabbi Judah Halevi: "Oh Zion, will you not ask after the welfare of your prisoners", included in Kinnot.

In the British-ruled Mandatory Palestine the term was applied to those who were persecuted by British powers.

In 1969 an Asirei Zion Association was established in Israel. Most of the prisoners of Zion were imprisoned for their activities in the Communist bloc countries and in the former Soviet Union (and were also known for being refuseniks). In addition to the Soviet Union, Jews from other Communist countries, such as East Germany and Romania, engaged in similar struggles and were also imprisoned. The term "prisoners of Zion" was extended over the years, and was also used to describe Jewish prisoners in dictatorships unrelated to the Soviet Union, who were arrested for pro-Israel activity or an attempt to encourage Jewish immigration to Israel. This name was given to Jews in Iraq, Morocco, Yemen and Ethiopia who were arrested for Zionist activities and activities to bring Jews to Israel, especially in the 1940s and 1950s.

The Authority for Prisoners of Zion, which manages information around the Prisoners' activities and promotes their memorialization, includes four committees corresponding to categories of eligible claimants:

- Committee for Immigrants from Eastern Europe
- Committee for Immigrants from Ethiopia
- Committee for Israeli Underground Fighters
- Committee for Immigrants from Muslim Countries

== Legislation and regulatory process for claims ==
In 1992, the Compensation Law for Prisoners of Zion and their families came into force in Israel. According to this law, prisoners of Zion living in Israel, or their relatives, are entitled to various benefits from the State of Israel.

Criteria to apply for recognition as a Prisoner of Zion include:

- Imprisonment or detention for at least six months due to putative Zionist activity in a country where Zionism is unlawful
- Imprisonment or detention for at least six months due to being Jewish, or due to the country in question's hostile relations with Israel (if that person is eligible for Israeli citizenship under Israel's Law of Return)
- Imprisonment, or detention or exile for one of the above reasons stated above, or having been arrested, detained or deported, and having been missing for more than 6 months since (if that person is eligible for Israeli citizenship under Israel's Law of Return)
- Onetime residents of Eretz Yisrael before the founding of the State, who, due to their ostensible involvement in the establishment of the State, were arrested, imprisoned, or deported for at least six months
- Persons who were arrested, imprisoned or deported for at least six months because of their putative Zionist activity in Israel during the period in which it was prohibited.
- Criteria are also defined for spouses, widows, and children of a prisoner of Zion and some other persons ("Families of Martyrs").

== Contemporary issues ==
Financial benefits and social recognition have not always been equitably allocated. For example, in 2006 an Ethiopian Jewish Israeli, Yerga Issa, spoke out about a lack of recognition of Ethiopian Jewish Prisoners of Zion: "All I am asking for is recognition. Everyone thinks that there were only Prisoners of Zion in Europe, but there were also many Ethiopians. I am ashamed to tell people that I carry the card of a Prisoner of Zion because I know they will laugh at me."

There have been persistent allegations of neglect of Prisoners of Zion over the years. In 1999, complaints were made about the Israeli pension system, which did not credit refuseniks and Prisoners of Zion for their activism in their former countries. Iosif Begun stated, “When I came here, I was free. I got work. But when it became close to the time when I would get my pension, I realized I had a problem. I realized that I and other Prisoners of Zion had no right to a pension because we did not work [long enough] in this state. And Russia was not going to give us a pension.” Ida Nudel, another longtime refusenik, was living on a pension that amounted to only 250 USD a month (in 2020 dollars, roughly $390). Yosef Mendelevitch, when interviewed in 2018, believed that the lack of regard stems from there being "no shortage of heroism" in Israel, that there are simply too many stories of heroism for the populace to manage. As well, "another reason for the general lack of knowledge and public indifference is that the struggle for Soviet Jewry [is seen as belonging] to the past."

However, there is an ongoing effort among many in the Jewish community (both in Israel and in the diaspora) to preserve the stories of Prisoners of Zion in their full nuance. Concern over the potential failure to transmit these stories to younger generations has led to exhibits, documentary films, and academic writing.

In 2020, certain Members of Knesset took umbrage at the fact that benefits owed to some 950 former Prisoners of Zion and former members of Jewish resistance groups were paid out based not on acts performed as Prisoners of Zion, but rather based on Prisoners' disability ratings and income. MK Alex Kushnir of the right-wing party Yisrael Beiteinu said, “The biggest problem with [the current] legislation is that the benefit is based on disability. You deserve a benefit only if you were injured in a certain activity you engaged in. A monthly or yearly grant would help in the recognition of the activities of these important people." It is accurate that the National Insurance Institute calculates and pays out benefits to Prisoners of Zion based on objective and calculable need - that is, type and degree of disability as well as income.

== See also ==
- Aliyah
- Babylonian captivity
- Migration diplomacy
- Movement to Free Soviet Jewry
- Pidyon shvuyim
- Prisoner of conscience
- Refusenik
- Jewish emigration from Romania
