= Ida Nudel =

Israeli activist (1931–2021)

- אידה נודל
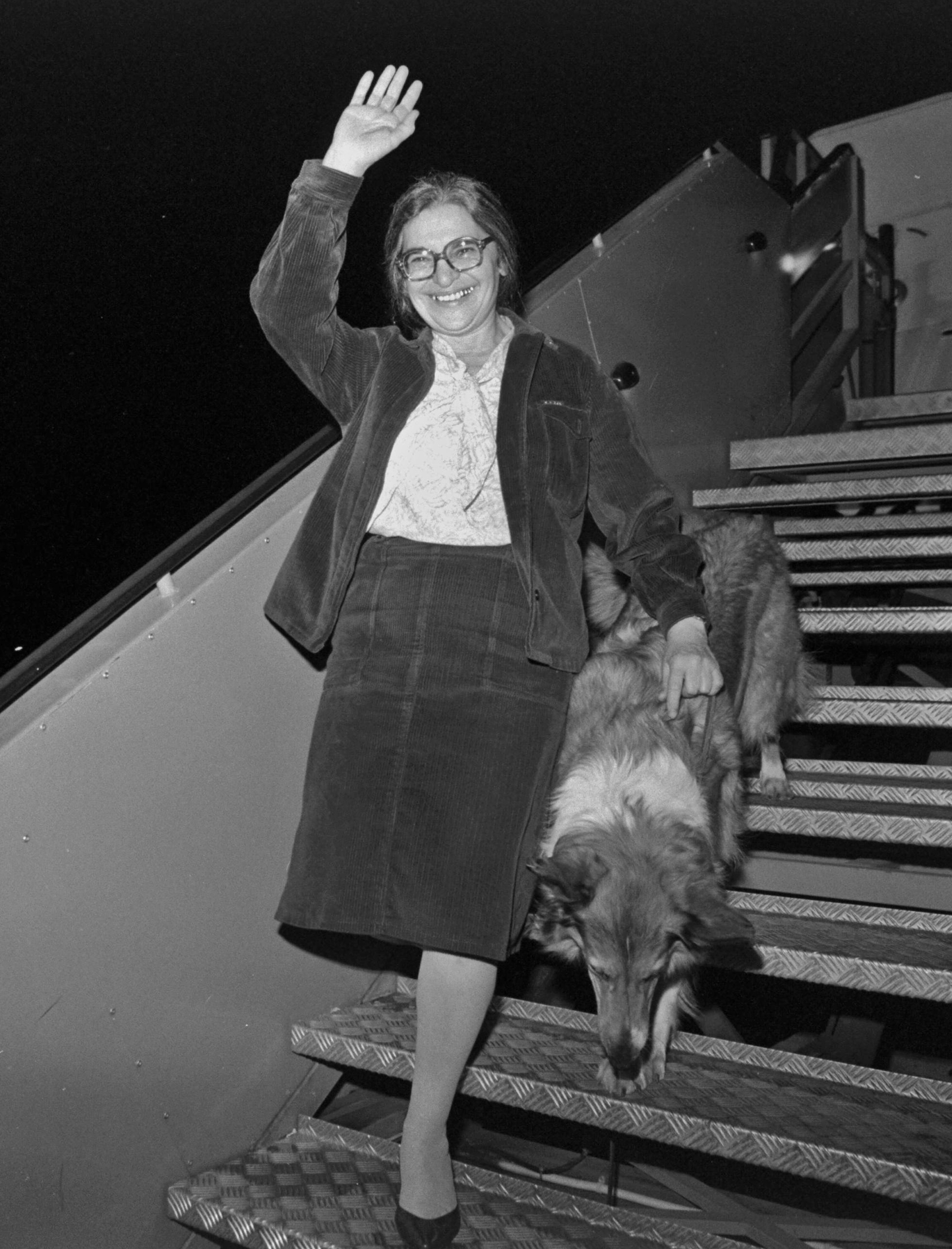
- Nudel and her dog arrive on a private plane, owned by Armand Hammer, at Ben-Gurion Airport
- Born: 27 April 1931; Novorossiysk, Azov-Black Sea Krai, Russian SFSR, Soviet Union
- Died: 14 September 2021 (aged 90); Rehovot, Israel
- Citizenship: Israeli
- Education: Economic
- Occupation: Economist
- Organization: "Mother to mother" אם-לאם
- Known for: Refusenik and an Israeli activist
- Relatives: Elena Ilana Fridman (sister), Lev Arie Fridman (brother-in-law), Yacov Fridman (nephew)

Ida Yakovlevna Nudel (Hebrew: אידה נודל; Russian: Ида Яковлевна Нудель; 27 April 1931 – 14 September 2021) was a Soviet-born Israeli refusenik and activist. She was known as the "Guardian Angel" for her efforts to help the "Prisoners of Zion" in the Soviet Union.

== Early life ==
Nudel was born in 1931 in Novorossiysk, Krasnodar Krai, in the Russian SFSR. In 1970, she heard of the Dymshits-Kuznetsov hijacking affair, and decided to emigrate. She contacted a Jew named Vladimir Prestin, a known refusenik who was secretly teaching Hebrew. In 1970, she first sought an exit visa to leave the USSR, saying she could not stand its discrimination against Jews. The authorities refused, saying she possessed state secrets she had learned working for the Moscow Institute of Planning and Production. Her sister, Elena, received permission to leave with her husband and son in 1972.

== Efforts to support Refuseniks ==
In the summer of 1972, she organized a hunger strike at the central office of the Communist Party of the Soviet Union to protest the arrest of refusenik Vladimir Markman. After four days, the police ended the strike by blocking their entry. She started a campaign for keeping contact with prisoners of Zion who called her "Mama" and "The angel of mercy". She spread word about items the prisoners needed and were permitted to possess, and requested them from visitors from all over the world. These included vitamins, warm underwear and chocolate, as well as pens, cigarettes, and three-dimensional postcards, that could be exchanged with the guards for small favors.

She soon lost her job. In June 1978, she placed a banner in her apartment in Moscow reading "KGB, give me my visa to Israel". She was sentenced to four years of internal exile. She was sent to Krivosheino, on the River Ob, Siberia. For several months, she was the only woman in a factory dormitory, before finding herself a log hut and a job as a night guard at a truck yard. The KGB warned the residents of the village to stay away from her. She kept receiving letters of support and corresponding with prisoners of Zion.

Activist groups were organized in the United States and Israel, calling attention to her plight and pushing for her release. In the US, the group Women for Ida Nudel (WIN) appealed to elected women officials to press for her release, and was run by the Long Island based activist for Soviet Jewry Lynn Singer.

She was released on 20 March 1982, having been warned not to associate with any refuseniks or foreigners. After almost a year in constant movement as she wasn't allowed back to her flat in Moscow nor gain permit to live in any other place, she was permitted to live for five years in Bender, Moldova.

From 1973, her sister Elena Fridman fought to bring her to Israel, contacting world leaders for help. In April 1984, Jane Fonda visited her, a meeting arranged by political activist and publicist Stephen Rivers. The two became friends and Fonda launched a campaign for Nudel's release. Others involved in the campaign included Liv Ullmann, and Israeli President, Chaim Herzog, left an empty place at his Passover table in her honor. On 2 October 1987, she was informed she had been granted an exit visa.

== Immigration to Israel ==
Nudel arrived in Israel on 15 October 1987. She was greeted at the Ben Gurion International Airport by Fonda, Israeli Prime Minister Yitzhak Shamir and Foreign Minister Shimon Peres as well as her sister and thousands of Israelis. She was granted an Israeli identity card and immigration papers, and had a brief telephone conversation with United States Secretary of State, George P. Shultz. The welcome ceremony was broadcast on Israeli television.

Nudel settled in Karmei Yosef, an agricultural community in the Judean foothills. She later wrote an autobiography, A Hand in the Darkness, which was translated into English by Stefani Hoffman in 1990. The movie Mosca Addio (Farewell Moscow) by Mauro Bolognini, starring Liv Ullmann, was a dramatized version of her ordeal. In 1991, she established "Mother to Mother", a nonprofit organization funded by donations from abroad, seeking to take the children of Russian immigrants off the streets and into after-school activities.

== Later life ==
Nudel testified in the Jerusalem District Court in 2001 for Natan Sharansky during his libel suit against Yuli Nudelman. Nudelman had published a book claiming that Sharansky was a former KGB agent with connections to the Russian mafia. Four years later, she petitioned the Supreme Court of Israel to force Prime Minister Ariel Sharon to use any measures necessary to save the lives of fifteen jailed Palestinian collaborators facing execution, and spoke against Israel's upcoming disengagement plan from Gaza and part of the West Bank. She filed a petition to the High Court of Justice in 2007, demanding that Israeli Internal Security Minister, Avi Dichter withhold visitation rights from Hamas and Hezbollah prisoners in Israel, as long as the Red Cross was prevented from seeing kidnapped Israel Defense Forces soldiers Gilad Shalit, Eldad Regev and Ehud Goldwasser. She relocated to Rehovot in 2008 in order to live closer to her sister.

Nudel died on 14 September 2021 at the age of 90. She was interred at Yarkon Cemetery in Tel Aviv.
