= Azezo =

Town in Amhara Region, Ethiopia

- Town
- Location in Azezo, Ethiopia
- Coordinates: 12.5586°N 37.4308°E
- Country: Ethiopia
- Region: Amhara
- Province: Begemder
- Established: 16th Century
- Elevation: 1,400 m (4,600 ft)

Population (2007)
  - Total: 33,719
- Time zone: UTC+3:00 (UTC+03:00)

Azezo (Amharic: አዘዞ) is a town in northern Ethiopia south of the city of Gondar.

== History ==
The town of Azezo was established around the same time Gondar was settled in the 16th century (between 1632 and 1687).

Azezo was occupied by the Italians during the follow-up to World War II, establishing a military camp nearby the village between 1936 and 1941. After the defeat of the Italians by a joint British and Ethiopian force (the Gideon Force), the camp remained operational.

In the early 1990s, following the overthrow of the Derg, the camp was partially demobilized and Azezo's main source of income was diminished, with the ecological care of nearby rivers being halted as a result.

Azezo today is a suburban market town that is mostly associated with its closest city, Gondar. Notable sites are the large soccer field situated in the center of the town as well as a few churches, such as Saint Teklehymanot.

The residents of Azezo are predominantly non-Jewish, but historically the town has had a Jewish population. In the late 1800s, working with the Swedish Mission of the Ethiopian Evangelical Church Mekane Yesus (EECMY), the Ethiopian intellectual and former Mayor of Gondar Gebru Desta established a school in Azezo that worked to convert the Gondar Jewish community to Christianity.
