= Yosef Mendelevitch =

Israeli rabbi (born 1947)

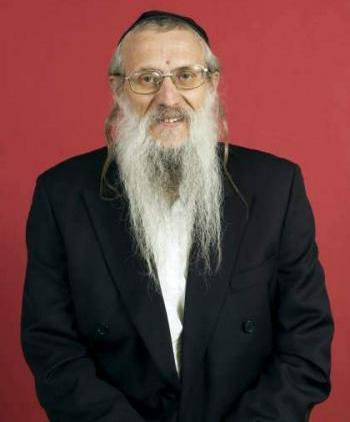
Yosef Mendelevitch

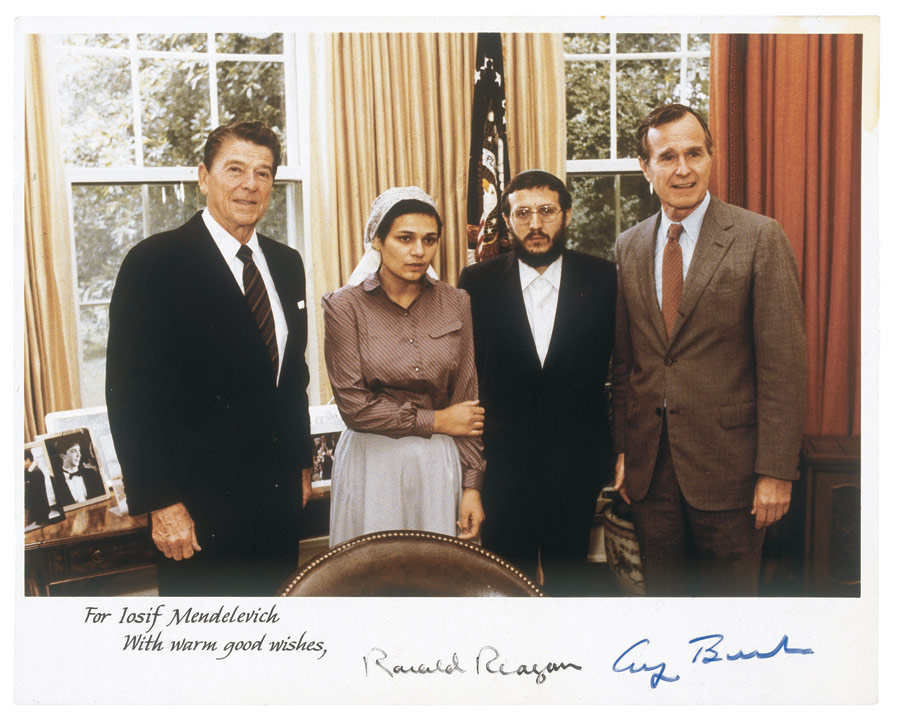
Yosef Mendelevitch with Ronald Reagan, Vice President Bush and Avital Sharansky in the White House, May 28, 1981.

Yosef Mendelevitch (or Mendelovitch) (Hebrew: 'יוסף מנדלביץ; born 1947 in Riga) is a refusenik from the former Soviet Union, also known as a "Prisoner of Zion" and now a politically unaffiliated rabbi living in Jerusalem who gained fame for his adherence to Judaism and public attempts to emigrate to Israel at a time when it was against the law in the USSR.

== Biography ==
Mendelevich was born in Riga and started his Jewish activities in the 1960s. He formed a student group of underground Jewish Education in 1966 and became the editor of Iton, an underground newsletter on Jewish issues, in 1969. After being repeatably refused the right to immigration, he became one of the leaders of the Dymshits–Kuznetsov hijacking affair, recounted in his 2012 memoir, Unbroken Spirit. As punishment, he was imprisoned for eleven years. During the imprisonment he was punished for keeping Jewish precepts. In 1981, he was released and immigrated to Israel.

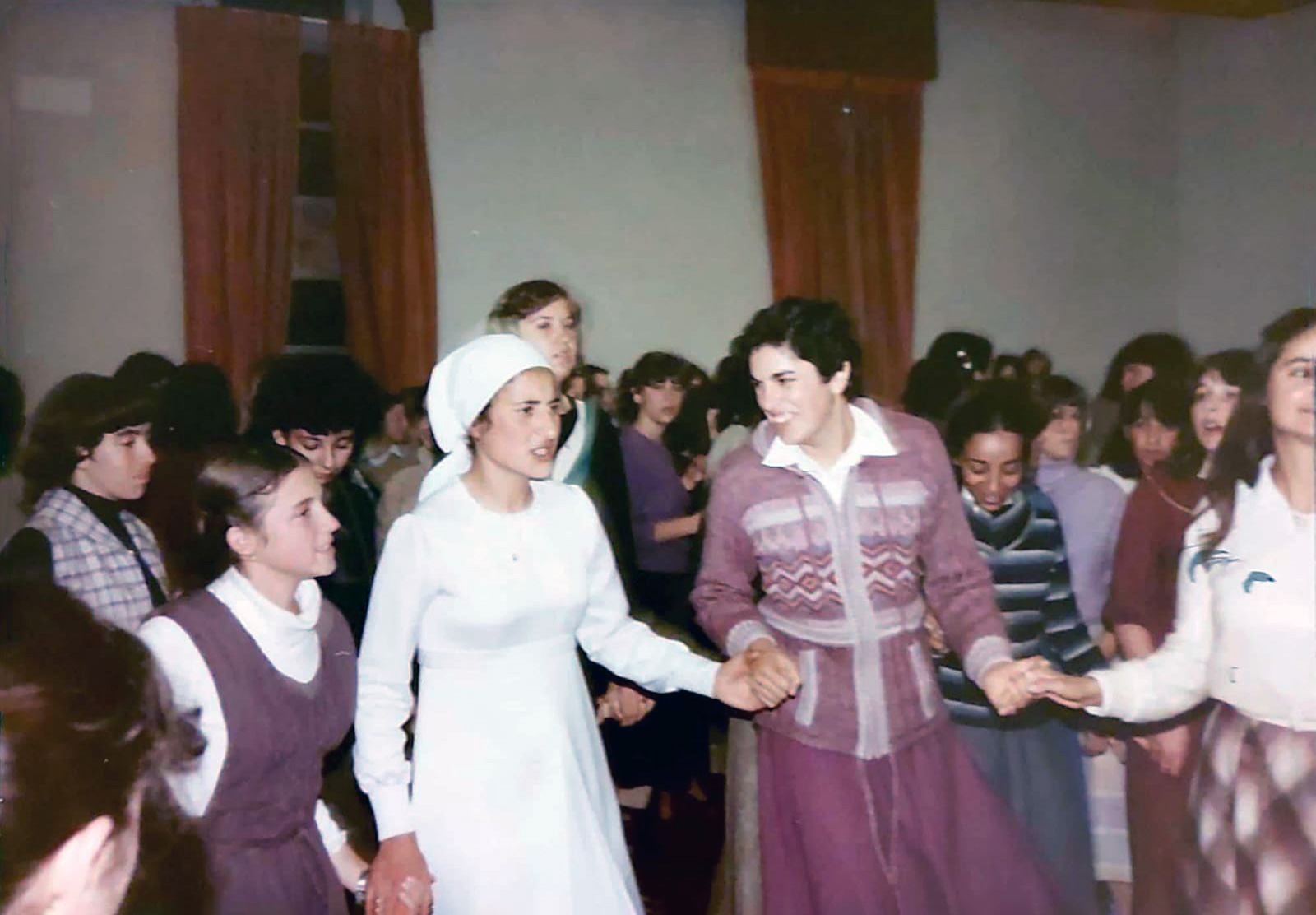
Kati Seroussi dancing during her wedding. Kati married Yoseph Mendelevich in Jerusalem, 1981

He served in Soviet prisons with famous Jewish dissident Natan Sharansky (amongst others). In Sharansky's memoir Fear No Evil he describes innovative ways Mendelevitch used to communicate with Sharansky, such as through both toilet bowls and radiators.

Mendelevitch had always exhibited leadership qualities. Early on in Israel he headed an organization called Soviet Jewry Information Center and has managed to attract followers to his causes. This has been attested to by his fellow refuseniks, such as Natan Sharansky: "In May 1988 he [Sharansky] founded the Zionist Forum, in preparation for the future waves of Aliyah from the Soviet Union, and based its activity on the database formed by former Refusenik Yosef Mendelevitch."

He was known as a "Prisoner of Zion." Since moving to Israel he adopted Orthodox Judaism and has become a rabbi affiliated with the Religious Zionist movement. He studied at Yeshivat Mercaz HaRav and was ordained as a rabbi by Rabbi Avraham Shapira and Rabbi She'ar Yashuv Cohen.

Mendelevitch has been a political activist from his days in the former USSR. When he moved to Israel, he became a globetrotting speaker on behalf of various causes, such as lobbying for the release of convicted spy Jonathan Pollard in the USA.

In his autobiography, written in Hebrew, מבצע חתונה אסיר ציון he describes his struggle as a "Prisoner of Zion."

Mendelevitch has become a popular speaker in various Jewish communities and has spoken out on controversial issues relating to Israel and the former Soviet Union. He has constantly involved himself in political and international affairs, Russia's support for Arab states, and the Arab–Israeli conflict, such as when he spoke out against a 1991 state visit by Soviet Foreign Minister Alexander Bessmertnykh's visit to Israel:

"Jews who spent years in Soviet prisons were far less enthusiastic than most Israelis about Soviet Foreign Minister Alexander Bessmertnykh's historic visit here Friday. ... 'It's nothing but a bad dream,' said Yosef Mendelevitch, another former Soviet prisoner, commenting on Bessmertnykh's visit, the first by a Soviet foreign minister to Israel. Mendelevitch spent about a decade in Soviet prisons on charges of attempting to hijack an airplane to Israel. He was freed and permitted to emigrate in 1981. He told Israel radio that he still distrusts the Soviets because of Moscow's alliance with Arab states. 'We should remember that a lot of the blood spilled here in the last 40 years was with Soviet weapons,' he added. Sharansky and Mendelevitch also criticized the Soviet leader for hinting Thursday in Amman that the tide of Soviet immigrants to Israel could be halted unless Israel stops building Jewish settlements in the West Bank and Gaza Strip."

There have been many articles, books and documentaries about his life.

== Sources ==
- Unbroken Spirit: A Heroic Story Of Faith, Courage and Survival, Gefen: 2012. ISBN 978-9652295637.
- Fear No Evil: The Classic Memoir of One Man's Triumph over a Police State, Public Affairs: 1998. ISBN 1-891620-02-9.
- מבצע חתונה אסיר ציון (Hebrew original)
- https://www.ou.org/jewish_action/05/2013/up-close-with-rabbi-yosef-mendelevich/
