= Vazif Meylanov =

Soviet dissident (1940–2015)

Vazif Sirazhutdinovich Meylanov
- Вазиф Сиражутдинович Мейланов
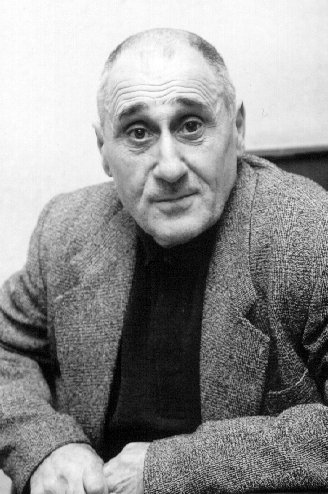
- Meylanov in 2005
- Born: May 15, 1940; Makhachkala, Dagestan ASSR, RSFSR, USSR
- Died: January 11, 2015 (aged 74); Makhachkala, Russia
- Education: Moscow State University
- Occupations: Mathematician; politician
- Known for: Fighting communists for the freedom of speech
- Spouses: Novikova Tatiana; Elena Glebovna Meylanova
- Children: 4

Vazif Sirazhutdinovich Meylanov (Russian: Вази́ф Сиражутди́нович Мейла́нов, 15 May 1940 – 11 January 2015) was a Soviet mathematician, social philosopher, writer, Soviet dissident, and political prisoner (1980–1989). He became renowned for his critical analyses on the theory of socialism, as well as for his singular endurance and uncompromising attitude towards authorities during his prison terms.

After his imprisonment and exile, Meylanov focused on the issue of personal freedom, examined social and political environments, dispelled stereotypes about Russian democracy, and analyzed the political consciousness of Russian society. Additionally, he was an opponent of nationalism and Islamism, advocating for the idea that human rights should be the foundation of human relationships and that a strong state apparatus should enforce these rights.

== Biography ==
=== Early years ===
Vazif Meylanov was born in Makhachkala on May 15, 1940. He is an ethnic Lezgin.

He studied at School No.1 in Makhachkala until 1954, then continued his education at School No.2 in Chardzhou (part of modern-day Turkmenistan) until his graduation in 1957.

From 1957 to 1958, Meylanov lived in Pyatigorsk while preparing for enrollment at Moscow State University. He studied at the Physics Faculty of Moscow State University between 1958 and 1961.

Meylanov served in the Soviet Army from 1961 to 1964. He then resumed his studies at the Faculty of Mechanics and Mathematics at Moscow State University from 1964 to 1969, attending seminars led by Anatoli Vitushkin. From 1969 to 1972, he was a post-graduate student there, and from 1972 to 1978, he taught advanced mathematics at Dagestan Polytechnic Institute.

In 1972, Vazif Meylanov wrote To flash as a tigress (Мелькнет тигрицей).

Vazif Meylanov is the author of two significant works on the mathematical theory of real-variable function: “Sequences of closed sets of bounded variation converging in the deviation metric” (1974) and “Two close sets of bounded variation”. The works were published in the journal “Mathematical Notes” and translated into English. The second work was also published in the United States.

=== Start of social and political activity ===
In 1977, Vazif Meylanov publicly wrote and published “Notes on the margins of Soviet newspapers", a philosophical and political work devoted to the criticism of communism theory. In this work, Meylanov argued for freedom of speech and press and called for the abolition of Articles 70 (Anti-Soviet agitation and propaganda) and 190-1 (defamation of the Soviet system) of the Criminal Code of the RSFSR.

In 1978, Vazif Meylanov was not re-elected by the Academic Council of the Institute for a new five-year term as a lecturer due to "being in opposition to the staff and damaging the communist education of youth".

From 1978 to 1980, Vazif Meylanov worked as a concrete worker of the 5th rank in the mobile mechanized column No.10 and the special mobile mechanized column No.18.

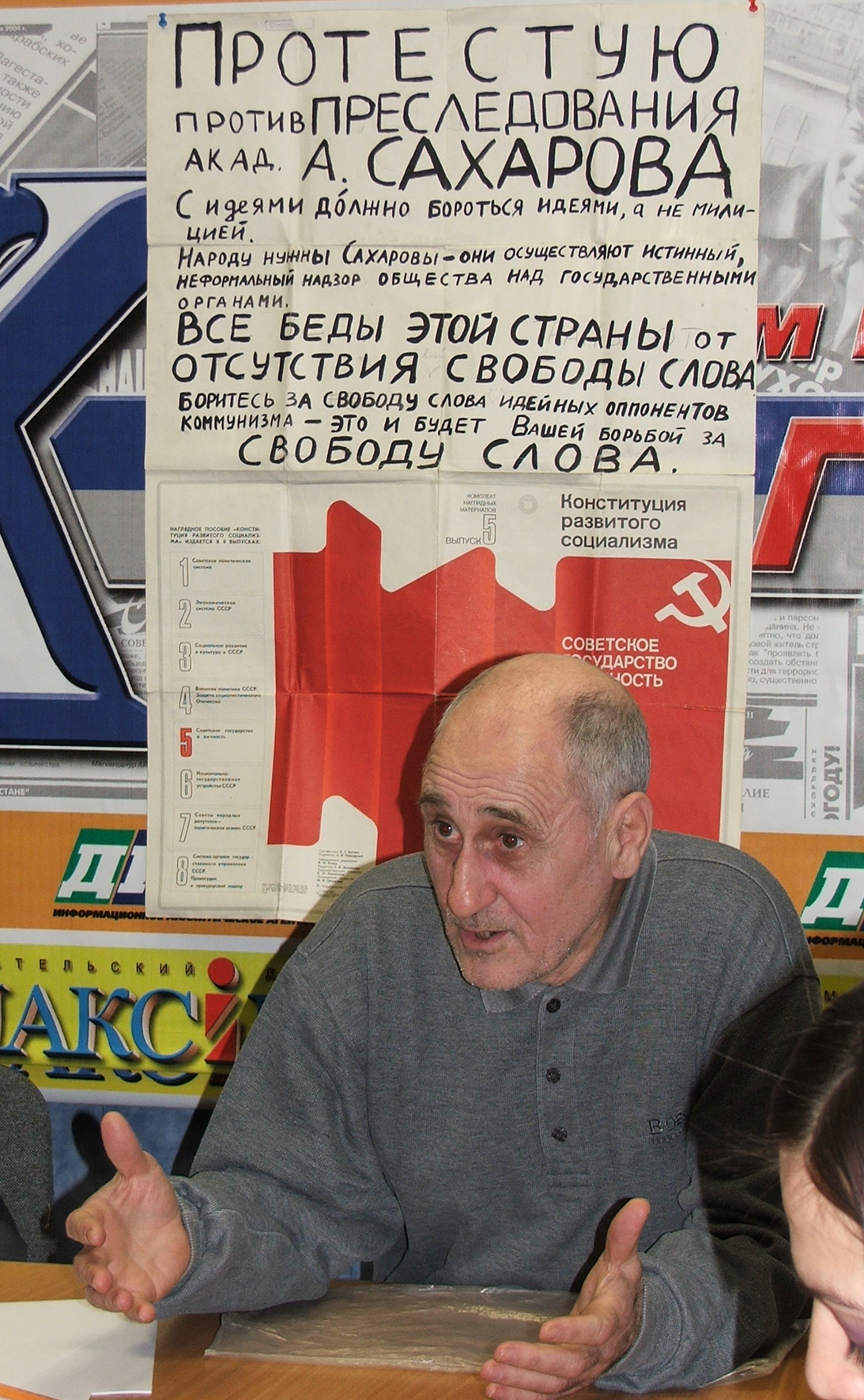
The 1980 protest banner by Meylanov: "I protest against the persecution of academician A. Sakharov. Ideas should be fought by ideas, not the police. People needs persons like Sakharov, as it is they who exercise the true informal control over the state organs. All troubles of this country are caused by the lack of freedom of speech. Fight for freedom of speech of ideological opponents of communism – it will be your fight for freedom of speech!"

On January 25, 1980, the day after Izvestia published an article announcing the exile of Andrei Sakharov to Gorky, Meylanov staged a protest in front of the Dagestan Regional Committee of the CPSU (Communist Party of the Soviet Union). His banner read

"I protest against the persecution of Sakharov. Ideas should be fought with ideas, rather than the police. The people need individuals like Sakharov – they provide true, informal oversight over the actions of the state. All the troubles of this country are due to the lack of freedom of speech. Fight for freedom of speech for ideological opponents of communism – it will be your fight for freedom of speech too! "

Meylanov was immediately arrested and taken to an undisclosed location. According to reports, his apartment was ransacked.

On December 2, 1980, Vazif Meylanov was found guilty by the Supreme Court of the Dagestan ASSR on three charges:

1. Writing and distributing his work "Notes on the margins of Soviet newspapers";
2. Going to the square with a banner;
3. The distribution of the books Cursed Days by Ivan Bunin, Necropolis by Vladislav Khodasevich, and Life of Sologdin by Dimitri Panin

Не was sentenced to 7 years in a strict regime labor camp and two years of exile.

In the remand prison, Meylanov wrote "Notes on the transcript of court sessions".

=== Imprisonment and exile ===
Vazif Meylanov was sent to the correctional labor colony No.35, also known as Perm-35, located in the western taiga zone of the Ural Mountains. This colony (389/35) was established for dangerous special criminals in 1972.

In the early 1980s, 270 political prisoners were serving time in the colony for dissidence, including notable figures such as Vazif Meylanov, Anatoly Sharansky, Vladimir Poresh, Anatoly Marchenko, Vladimir Bukovsky, Joseph Begun, Sergei Grigoryants, Gleb Yakunin, Yuriy Orlov, Sergei Kovalev, Valery Senderov, and many others. Meylanov arrived in the colony on March 26, 1981. There, he refused to participate in correctional forced labor, writing a statement to Major Osin, Chief of the colony, on August 28, 1981:

"I refuse to work in the colony in protest against forced labor in prison camp, which contradicts the status of political prisoners. I claim the following changes to the Internal Rules of correctional labor colony and to the correctional labor code (for political prisoners): 1. To establish the principle of voluntary participation in the labor force. 2. To put an end to deductions from wages of political prisoners for maintenance of the prison administration and guard. Commentary. The percentage of deductions should be the same as at liberty. If society is afraid of me, then ... let them pay for their fears! That’s the way the world wags - for your fears you have to pay yourself. Transmit this information to the workers and the peasants. 3. To put an end to the shameful practice of hunger tortures in punitive confinement. Commentary. Nutritional standards in punitive confinement should be the same as that in the colony (2A)."

Vazif Meylanov was imprisoned in punitive confinement, with nutritional standard 9b (every second day), from April 10, 1981, to June 1982, for refusing to work. During that period of time, he was twice goaded into dystrophy, then placed in the prison hospital. Afterwards, he was imprisoned in punitive confinement again.

As Vazif Meylanov didn't give his consent to work, his restriction was changed and he was transferred to prison in Chistopol, where he spent three years from 1982 to 1985 in a punishment cell with a strict prison regime.

On September 10, 1982, whilst in Chistopol prison, Vazif Meylanov wrote a statement which explained to the Communist state his attitude towards attempts to rectify him by means of forced labor: “Do you want to rectify me by means of forced labor? Sorry, but I don’t want to mend my ways. (…)There are two levels of violence, one – is not to allow someone to do something, it is the lowest level of violence; the other – to make somebody do something, it is the highest level of violence, which abuses one’s soul. But I seek to reduce the level of violence in the world, that is why I encourage you to pass from the highest level of violence to the lowest. "

In 1983, Vazif Meylanov wrote two books: "Disarmament and criminal codes" and "I talk to the Communists." Both of them were transferred outside the prison and were published in the Archives of Samizdat (dissident underground press in the USSR).

The following is an extract from the characteristics of the convicted person for the period from 26.07.1982 to 06.05.1985:

“During term of punishment convicted Meylanov made extremely bad showing. From the first days of imprisonment he was involved in socially useful work, in particular knitting bags, but for the entire period of his sentence Meylanov has not started to work, for which he was repeatedly punished as a disciplinary measure. He doesn’t keep regular hours and custodial control, for which he was punished 13 times as a disciplinary measure, including 6 times in solitary confinement. He responds extremely negatively to political educational events. He is unfriendly towards policy of the CPSU and the Soviet government and tends to write scandalous reports. He actively participates in the manifestations of negatively-spirited part of the convicts. Convicted Meylanov refuses consciously to mend his ways”.

In 1985, Vazif Meylanov was returned to the same colony and to the same punishment cell, given food every second day (from 10.07.1985 to 03.09.1986). From there, he returned again to Chistopol prison in solitary confinement regime till the end of the term. Jailers failed to force Meylanov to work and he did not work a single day.

In 1986, Mikhail Gorbachev launched a campaign for the release of political prisoners in the wake of reforms. However, inside prisons and camps, the campaign did not look so magnificent. Since 1985 machine of coercion in prisons gathered pace, as the detention regime changed for the worse, the rules became stricter, while punishment became harsher. Some political prisoners were released, but they had to write a statement with the promise to comply with the Soviet laws henceforth.

On January 19, 1987, Soviet prosecutors Ovcharov and Semenov arrived in Chistopol prison. At the moment I am in strict confinement, it's the first month of this regime, and that is why I get nutrition in isolation cell. Representatives of the Soviet Prosecutor's Office tell me that they fulfill the order of the Presidium of the Supreme Soviet of the USSR: they have authority to release those political prisoners who will give written assurances to comply with existing laws in the country. People exhausted for years of imprisonment were deprived of victory ...

I am writing an application to the Presidium of the Supreme Soviet: "Whenever it was day and hour of my release, I will violate the Soviet laws – in particular Articles № 70 and № 190-1 of the Criminal Code of the RSFSR. I demand their exclusion from the Code. "Jailors decided to put pressure on me by means of my relatives, on February 26, 1987 I was transferred from the Chistopol prison to Makhachkala detention center. I had two appointments with my parents and my brother. They were asked to persuade me to write the required statement. My old parents (77-year-old father and 74-years-old mother) and brother asked me to write. My mother told me that before the end of my exile she and my father could die. I said to my relatives, that "seventy years the criminal regime used humans for the consolidation of inhumanity," and that "nothing in the world will encourage me to surrender to the increasingly inhumane regime."

Vazif Meylanov refused to sign a statement promising to respect Soviet laws and served his full sentence in prison and exile. On September 11, 1987, he was transferred from the isolation cell of Chistopol prison to place of his exile - Yakutia, village Namtsy of the Verkhnevilyuisk region.

Living conditions in exile were very heavy, Meylanov refused to work as a sorter of potatoes and demanded to work in the specialty, which created for him the danger of being arrested and judged - for parasitism. Vazif Meylanov wrote about it in his "Letter to Russian writers." This essay, written in the form of an appeal to people, who glorify the Party's new course and speak about the changes in society and are reticent about the latest unbroken people still serving time in prison and exile - for the word.”

"Lovers of mankind! Teachers of people! Well, why should I be in exile now in the era of spiritual rebirth and democracy? I was punished for the word, my teachers! I would have gone to bat for you, if you had been punished for the word! (...) I understand that you are busy, everyone needs you, all ask you to write articles, while I have a private question: for refusing to work not in the specialty, that is the refusal to accept the punishment and forced physical labor Meylanov will be sentenced for a new term, under not political but criminal article - for parasitism ... private issue, which doesn’t matter now, when the party launches a great campaign for reorganization and democratization of all aspects of our lives. "

From the correspondence of that time with the leaders of the Amnesty International, Diane and John Beddouz we know that health of Vazif Meylanov has been undermined after several years of camps, prisons, solitary confinement, after being tortured by hunger. In July 1988 in Yakutsk Oncology Center doctors had his basal-cell carcinoma out.

Vazif Meylanov returned from exile to Makhachkala on December 25, 1988.

=== Rehabilitation and activity in modern Russia ===
In September 1989 Vazif Meylanov became a chairman of the Union of Democratic Forces of Dagestan, then a chairman of movement "Democratic Dagestan", but in August 1992 he left all political parties and movements and devoted himself to what he calls "private politics". On August 20, 1989, he sent to his appeal to the Congress of People's Deputies of the Soviet Union with the requirement to launch a trial, like Nuremberg trial, of the Communist Party and the Communist ideology of the USSR to “The Russian thought" journal. The editorial staff refused to publish the article because of "untimeliness" of such claims.

In 1990 the Latvian newspaper "Atmoda" published an article of Vazif Meylanov "On the road of Shafarevich to precipice" (“The Russian thought” journal refused to publish the article because it criticizes the stance of Sakharov, who recently died). The article criticizes the views of Shafarevich on history and draws attention to basic mistakes of "Russian national consciousness."

In early 1990 Vazif Meylanov was nominated for the deputies of the public organization - the Union of Cooperators of DASSR. However, the district election commission refused to register him as a candidate even after direct reference of the Central Election Commission. The representative of the CEC of the RSFSR during telephone call admitted that the demand not to register Vazif Meylanov as a candidate had come directly from Magomedali Magomedov, who was the Chairman of the Presidium of the Supreme Soviet of the Dagestan ASSR at that time. The documentary chronicle of the story was published in the "Komsomolets of Dagestan” newspaper.

In the summer of 1990 Meylanov participated in resolving the ethnic conflict in the ethnically Avar village of Tivi, Kvareli region of Georgia. The conflict was provoked by supporters of Georgian president Zviad Gamsakhurdia, who was against the Avars. After the publication of Meylanov's points on Georgia in the newspaper "Komsomolets of Dagestan" its editor Tatyana Voronina was removed from her post. Journalists Alexander Torba, Dmitry Gorbanev, Sharapudin Magomedov resigned from the newspaper in protest at the decision of the Regional Committee of the Dagestan Young Communist League (Komsomol).

In 1990 Vazif Meylanov published a brochure "At first hand", which includes works written in the Chistopol prison.

In 1990 Vazif Meylanov was rehabilitated. The rehabilitation decision was made by the authorities, without any effort of the former prisoner. On December 6, 1989, First Deputy Chairman of the Supreme Court RSFSR Radchenko sent an application No. 1646 on Vazif Meylnov's rehabilitation to the Presidium of the Supreme Court. On January 3, 1990, resolution of the Presidium of the Supreme Court dismiss charges from Meylanov for the distribution of books of Solzhenitsyn, Bunin, Khodasevich, Panin and charges for going to the square with a banner in support of Andrei Sakharov. The rest of the sentence was upheld, that is Meylanov still was considered to be guilty of "writing slanderous anti-Soviet works." The criminal case against Vazif Meylanov was completely closed for absence of a crime in the act by the Resolution of the Plenum of the Supreme Court of the USSR No. 2004-90 November 29, 1990, after repeated protest of the Prosecutor General of the USSR Sukharev No.13 / 209–80 on July 18, 1990. Vazif Meylanov found out about his rehabilitation by chance in 1991. He received back original investigation files and identification record of the prisoner.

From 1991 to 1994 Vazif Meylanov published the newspaper “Vzglyad” (“Sight”) and the author's paper "Another Sky".

On July 3, 1995, Vazif Meylanov filed a suit with the Supreme Court of Dagestan against the Russian Federation for compensation for harm caused to him by the communist Soviet Union unlawful arrest, conviction and imprisonment for seven and a half years and exile for a year and a half.

From 1994 to 1997 he worked as a senior research fellow at the Institute of Social and Economic Research of the Dagestan Scientific Center Russian Academy of Sciences. From 1995 to 1998 he has been writing and publishing the book "Analysis of the Chechen crisis," the central idea of which is the idea of the need of compliance with law to preserve freedom. At the same time he examined mistakes and false stereotypes of democratic leaders, which became evident in the view of the Chechen crisis. The book "Another Sky. False stereotypes of Russian democracy. Analysis of the Chechen crisis" was published in 100 copies in the printing-office of Dawood Zulumhanov in Makhachkala. Vazif Meylaniv attempted to publish this book in Moscow due to various publishers and foundations, but all publishers rejected - his point of view on the issue came into conflict with the opinion of the "progressive community" that supported Chechen president Dzhokhar Dudayev: "I found necessary to express my opinion about the Chechen war, because all formal and informal teachers of Russia and the world took the side of Chechen nationalists, Chechen national liberators, Chechen national revolutionists, and It’s them (national liberators), who I regard as the wrong side".

In the 1990s Vazif Meylanov continued to elaborate on the definition of freedom and its conditionality precisely metered by the lack of freedom for all and the ban to violate the freedom of others. He criticized nationalism (giving the examples of Chechnya and Georgia) and pointed out the danger of Islamism.

In 1999 he was nominated by a group of young people as a candidate of the National Assembly of the Dagestan Republic in Lezgin constituency. The district election commission refused to register the initiative group, because it found inaccuracies in the design of the subscription lists. The initiative group filed a suit and won the trial, according to the decision of the Leninsky District Court of Makhachkala Vazif Meylanov was registered as a candidate 2 days before the end of the election campaign.

In 2003 the third edition of the "Analysis of the Chechen crisis" and "False stereotypes of Russian democracy" were published under the title "The experience of private political activity in Russia."

In 2001 the magazine "Znamya" (Banner) published an article of Vazif Meylanov "On abolition of civil rights in Russia." The article is devoted to the discovery, which was made by the author at the end of legal battles with the state in the case of compensation for harm caused by illegal imprisonment and exile for 9 years. The Court awarded compensation to the author in the amount of 311 thousand rubles. But officers of justice returned the judgment with a note that according to Article 110 of the Federal Law "On the Federal Budget for 2001" claimant presents himself the decision of the court to the debtor. That is, in fact, enforcement of claims to the state in Russia were canceled (the bailiff service guarantees the enforcement, if the debtor – is a private or legal entity). And the enforcement is not canceled by the procedural law (e.g., the Enforcement law), but by substantive law adopted per year – by the budget. That is, in Russia - according to law - the state has the right not to pay its debts, despite the court's decision. The principle of compulsory execution of court decisions has an exception for the state - it now executes the court decisions voluntary. After analyzing this issue and summarizing the Russian practice of non-compliance with court decisions on claims to the state since 2001 (article, which repeals the enforcement, was repeated in subsequent law on the budget). In 2006 Vazif Meylanov wrote and published the book “Mistaken constants of Russian consciousness" with the subtitle "Why court decision satisfying the claims of citizens against the state are not implemented in Russia” in publishing house "Socium".

In 2005 due to the universal obligatory exchange of old Russian national passports for new passports Vazif Meylanov handed in application for a new passport in the passport and visa service of the Leninsky district of Makhachkala. But Meylanov didn't receive a new passport under the pretext of the absence of residence registration his old passport. He went to court and on July 29, 2005, the Leninsky District Court of Makhachkala held:

"To recognize illegal the inaction of officials of the passport and visa service of the Leninsky district Police Department of Makhachkala, which left unanswered the application of Russian citizen Meylanov for a new passport. Compel the head of the passport and visa service of the Leninsky district Police Department of Makhachkala to issue a passport of the Russian Federation of the new sample to Vazif Meylanov, who was born and live in Makhachkala.”

But the chief of Leninsky district Police Department refused to comply with the court's decision and gave the curious supervisory appeal to the Supreme Court of the Dagestan Republic, however, this appeal remained unsatisfied. Vazif Meylanov handed over documents for execution to the bailiffs, who two months later stated that they could not make the passport office issue the new passport to Vazif Meylanov. Finally, Vazif Meylanov received the new passport in Foreigner Regional Registrational Office. The story about the exchange of passport was described in details by Natalia Krainova in the series of articles, published in the newspaper "New Business" in 2005–2006.

In the 2000s the articles of Vazif Meylanov were published in the regional newspapers “Chernovik” (Rough copy) and “Novoe delo ” (New affair).

Vazif Meylanov died on January 11, 2015, in Makhachkala after suffering from Alzheimer disease for years. He was buried on the New Cemetery in Makhachkala, Russia.

== Publications ==
=== Books ===
- To flash as a tigress, 1972.
- Notes on the margins of Soviet newspapers, 1977.
- Notes on the transcript of court sessions, 1980.
- Disarmament and criminal codes, 1983.
- Talk to communists, 1983.
- The notes-revellers, 1988.
- Analysis of the Chechen crisis, 1998.
- False stereotypes of Russian democracy, 1998.
- The experience of private political activity in Russia, 2003.
- Mistaken constants of Russian consciousness. Why court decision satisfying the claims of citizens against the state are not implemented in Russia, 2006.

=== Featured articles ===
- Anti-Communist Nuremberg: Vazif Meylanov to Congress of Deputies and the Supreme Soviet of the USSR, "August 20, 1989
- On the road of Shafarevich to precipice, December 4, 1989
- What does it mean to deal with politics in Russia: Today's answer to MSU students to their question posed in1968, September 20, 1999
- On abolition of civil rights in Russia, the Znamya journal No. 11, 2001
- Bunin’s Cursed Days was published in the Council of Deputies for the first time, Vzglyad, No.2, April 12, 1991

=== Essays ===
- Defender, May 30, 1985, the Chistopol prison
- Essay on violence, August 31, 1984, the Chistopol prison (From a letter to Svetlana Balashova)
- A letter to Russian writers, January 27, 1988, exile, Namtsy, Yakutia ASSR

=== Documents ===
Documents from the investigation file and the identification record of the prisoner remain deposited in the private archive of Vazif Meylanov. It's partially published in the book "The experience of private political activity in Russia", 2003.

== References in texts of contemporaries ==
Many contemporaries mentioned Vazif Meylanov in his writings, appeals and memoirs. This section presents some extracts devoted to Vazif Meylanov from the texts of his contemporaries. Meylanov is one of those who in 1980 came up with a slogan for my release and protested against my illegal exile to Gorky. I am now in front of you, but Meylanov - only because he refused to appeal for pardon, that is, to recognize, as he believed, formally at least, that he was lawfully in prison - is still deprived of his liberty. "— Andrei Sakharov, press-conference in the Ministry of Foreign Affairs, June 3, 1988

Natan Sharansky devoted many pages to Vazif Meylanov in his book Fear no evil, 1991: "Soon after arriving in our prison Meylanov said: - I am not a slave. As long as the labor is forced in colony, I will not work. Naturally, he immediately found himself in the isolation cell and wasn’t transferred back. I remember the early months of his struggle, few believed that Vazif would hold his position. "We have broken even stronger prisoners!" - said the cops. "We have seen more brave men," - said those prisoners who were weaker in spirit and the most jealous. But four years later, when, even without knowing it, I was living the last months in prison, sitting together with Meylanov in punishment cell, he also stood firm on his own, as at the beginning. The years of punishment cells and prisons fell behind, his health was destroyed, but KGB didn't manage to break his spirit. In the political prisons there were a lot of resistant dissidents, but even on their background Meylanov stood out due to his enduring perseverance."— Natan Sharansky, Fear no evil, 1991
