= Student Struggle for Soviet Jewry =

American Jewish student organization (1964–1991)

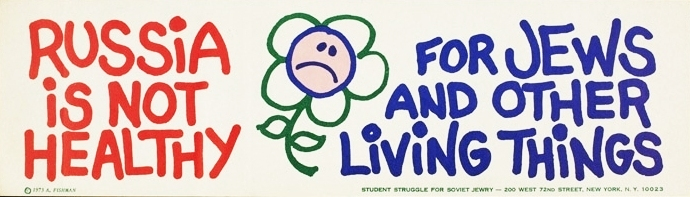
1970s poster by Morey Schapira

The Student Struggle for Soviet Jewry (SSSJ) was an American Jewish student organization founded by Jacob Birnbaum in 1964. It engaged in various types of advocacy for Jews in the Soviet Union, seeking to raise awareness of the denial of their civil and political rights by the Soviet government. Its members frequently demonstrated throughout New York City and rallied support for economic pressure against the Soviet Union, most notably including large protests of hundreds of people at the Permanent Mission of the Soviet Union to the United Nations. The organization also focused on Eastern Bloc emigration, which was a highlight of the Cold War; Soviet citizens, especially those who were Jewish, were largely not allowed to leave the country. As a result, the SSSJ worked in the United States to facilitate Soviet Jewish emigration, primarily to Israel. Although the organization was effectively disbanded following the dissolution of the Soviet Union in 1991, Birnbaum continued his advocacy for the remaining Jewish communities of the post-Soviet countries until his death in 2014.

== History ==
=== “Let My People Go” foundation period in 1960s ===
The Student Struggle for Soviet Jewry (often referred to simply as "Student Struggle" or "SSSJ" or "Triple-S-J") was created in 1964 by Jacob Birnbaum from the UK to spearhead an American grassroots movement to liberate the Jews of the Soviet Union. After Birnbaum founded an adult arm two years later, in order to obtain charitable status and adult support, SSSJ's official name became the Center for Russian Jewry with Student Struggle for Soviet Jewry but continued to be known as SSSJ. It was also known as the Center for Russian and East European Jewry in the latter 1970s and the 1980s.

Birnbaum's father and grandfather were recognized authorities on East European Jewry. He had extensive experience in assisting survivors of Nazi and Soviet totalitarianism after World War II, and later mobilized British students to assist distressed Jews of North Africa.

A citizen of the UK, he arrived in New York City in the latter part of 1963 where he noted increasing expressions of public concern for the plight of Soviet Jews but encountered only one grassroots activist, Morris Brafman, who had just put together a small group, soon to be known as the American League for Russian Jews, in Brooklyn's Mill Basin area. (At the time Birnbaum did not hear of a 1962 one-time Matzoh demonstration by a small group of Yeshiva University High School students led by Columbia University student Bernard Kabak.) By January 1964 he was settled in Washington Heights near Yeshiva University where he began to build a teacher-student core and also contacted other metropolitan campuses. In the same month, he persuaded Bernard Kaplan, the Social Action Chairman of the national student organization Yavneh to set up a Soviet Jewry committee and by April he was ready to go national and issued a Manifesto titled "College Students Struggle for Soviet Jewry" convening a founding meeting at Columbia University for April 27, 1964. His use of the term "struggle" was ironically designed as a spinoff of the Marxist term "class struggle."

The New York Times wrote in Birnbaum's 2014 obituary: "Mr. Birnbaum insisted that every rally include posters declaring 'Let my people go,' the line from Exodus 9:1 that became the clarion call of the movement."

==== Initial activism ====
After the Eichmann trial in 1961 (witnessed by Birnbaum in Jerusalem) people had become increasingly aware of the horrors of the Holocaust, so the Columbia meeting proved emotional and there was a call for action. Birnbaum proposed a protest rally outside the Soviet UN Mission on the Soviet May Day holiday, only four days later. He mobilized his Yeshiva University core, contacted other campuses, and some 1,000 students showed up, getting excellent media publicity. According to the Center for Jewish History, this May Day rally marked the commencement of public confrontation with the Kremlin and the initiation of the national movement for Soviet Jewry. Thereafter, four other Soviet Jewry pioneers, Dr. Moshe Decter, Professor Abraham Joshua Heschel, Israeli diplomat Dr. Meir Rosenne, and Dr. Louis Rosenblum of Cleveland (later founding Chairman of the Union of Councils for Soviet Jews), were delighted to support Birnbaum's initiatives.

Ten days later, Birnbaum formed SSSJ's first steering committee and initiated a series of ground-breaking public events which in the course of two years resulted in a surge of public consciousness which pushed the hesitant U.S. Jewish establishment from a policy of quiet diplomacy toward a more activist mode. In 1964, this commenced with the dispatch of information kits to student summer camps nationally in May, a week-long interfaith fast in June, and a massive rally in October with the participation of President Lyndon Johnson's representative Mayer Feldman, New York Senators Jacob Javits and Kenneth Keating, and Mayor John Lindsay on the Lower East Side, the original area of East European Jewish settlement.

One unique characteristic of Birnbaum's mobilization of public opinion was to draw on ancient Jewish redemptive themes — for example, the intensification of activities around Passover time, with its themes of liberation and exodus. SSSJ's first student button portrayed a shofar with the wording "Save Soviet Jewry." The years 1964–1966 served as the early "Shofar period" of the Soviet Jewry movement – a call to conscience and a call to action.

==== Infrastructure ====
In 1965 Birnbaum led SSSJ in a challenge to the wall of separation cutting off Soviet Jewry. He organized two Jericho Marches around Soviet diplomatic buildings in New York (April) and Washington, DC (May) to the accompaniment of the sounds of the shofar. The walls did not tumble down but the media understood the symbolism. At the April event, Rabbi Shlomo Carlebach first sang his great Jewish solidarity anthem (sought from him by Birnbaum), "Am Yisrael Chai", meaning "The Jewish people live." In December 1965, for the festival of Hanukkah, Birnbaum ordered a quantity of metal piping and personally supervised the all-night building of a huge candelabra for a Freedom Lights Menorah March through Central Park. Nineteen months of intense street activity plus the distribution of much educational material resulted in a breakthrough, stirring a number of Jewish establishment organizations to greater activism, and they joined SSSJ's great Redemption (Geulah) March of Passover 1966 with a record turnout of some 12,000 people. The Exodus March of Passover 1970 drew some 20,000, as did a Madison Square Garden Hanukkah event in 1971.

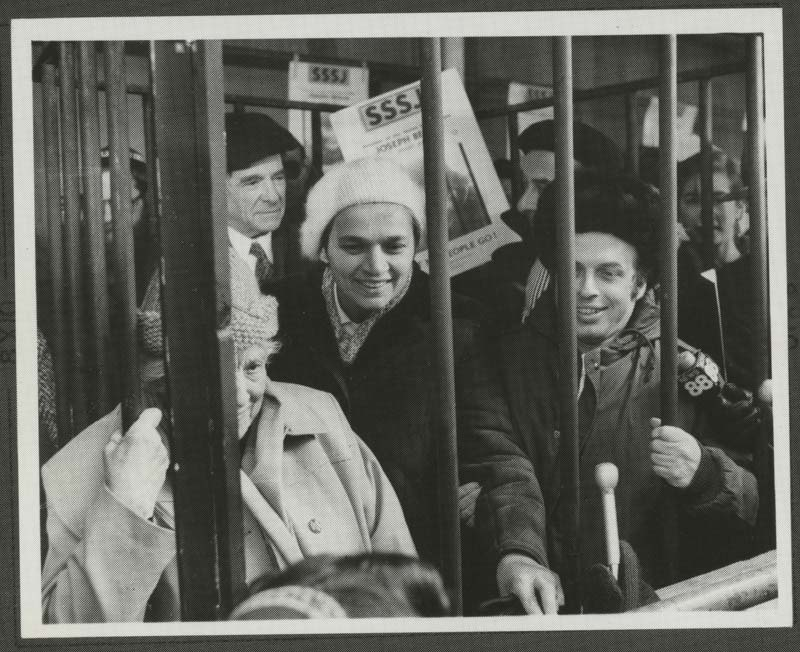
Ida Milgrom, Avital Sharansky, and Natan Sharansky

From 1964 to 1971, SSSJ was the only American organization engaged in a full-time campaign for Soviet Jewry, independently raising its meager funding from the grassroots without official assistance. Though from the beginning Birnbaum directed SSSJ on a strictly responsible non-violent policy of moderate activism, "along the lines of aggressive civil rights organizations like the Student Nonviolent Coordinating Committee," the Jewish establishment was intensely hostile.

Birnbaum was able to attract a number of sympathizers in the Establishment, including major figures such as Rabbi Herschel Schacter, former Chairman of the Conference of Presidents, Rabbi Israel Miller, Richard Maass and Stanley Lowell, first and second chairmen of the National Conference on Soviet Jewry, Norman Lamm, later President of Yeshiva University. In the academic world, his founding supporters included Rabbi Shlomo Riskin, Chairman and Irving Greenberg, Vice Chairman. Rabbi Avraham Weiss became an officer in 1971, accelerated SSSJ’s activist modes, and campaigned strongly for Anatoly Sharansky. He was chairman from 1984–1989, succeeding Riskin as chairman.

Founding students included Sandy Frucher, Hillel Goldberg, Arthur Green, Dennis Prager, Glenn Richter, Benjamin Silverberg, James Torczyner, and Sanford Zwickler. After some years, Richter gave up his law studies and joined Birnbaum full-time to become National Coordinator in which capacity he served until January 1990. Originally Birnbaum's fastest typist, he assumed the bulk of SSSJ's administrative routines, and became well known for his small "rapid response" demonstrations, his informative press releases, and together with Allan Miller, the compilation of massive lists of prisoners of conscience and refuseniks.

===== American (National) Conference on Soviet Jewry =====
The official American Conference on Soviet Jewry, was established in April 1964 as a follow-up to a meeting convened in October 1963 by Moshe Decter, "a writer who championed Soviet Jews." The meeting included Dr. Martin Luther King Jr. The group was renamed National Conference on Soviet Jewry in 1971.

This group, however, barely functioned without an allocated budget or permanent staff till the Leningrad trial of December 1970 finally shocked the Jewish leadership into the establishment in September 1971 of two officially funded groups — the National Coalition Supporting Soviet Jewry and the Greater New York Conference on Soviet Jewry. The latter was built on the New York infrastructure constructed by Birnbaum in the 1960s on the basis of a number of local and metropolitan groups instituted by him, a Bronx Council, an invigorated Queens Council, a Brooklyn Coalition, and a New York Youth Conference, a New York Coordinating Committee, followed by a New York Conference, now assisted by a staffer at the American Jewish Committee, more committed to the cause than most establishment organizations.

Malcolm Hoenlein, a Birnbaum disciple, was the founding director of the Greater New York Conference and initiated in 1972 the Solidarity Sunday marches and rallies modeled on SSSJ's 1960s events. By the 1980s, these great annual public events in New York drew attendances of over 100,000.

=== Economic pressure on the Kremlin in the 1970s ===
In the 1970s and 1980s, Birnbaum shifted his attention to new policy initiatives. In the early 1970s, SSSJ concentrated on the utilization of economic pressures on the Kremlin. He had in fact testified in Congress on this concept as early as May 1965, was in close contact with Senator Henry "Scoop" Jackson's office regarding the Jackson-Vanik Amendment signed into law almost ten years later in January 1975.

Pressure was applied by President Reagan on the Soviet Union's Mikhail S. Gorbachev.

Coverage by the New York Times (and presence of important government officials) for smaller scale marches and demonstrations also forwarded a message.

Birnbaum testified in Congress some eighteen times between 1976 and 1986 in relation to the Amendment's application to emigration from Romania and achieved the release of six long-time prisoners, a rescue which elicited an enthusiastic letter of congratulations from the State Department.

=== "Let My People Know" (their heritage): Defense of Jewish self-education groups in the 1980s ===
During the 1980s, Birnbaum deepened SSSJ's support of a Jewish awakening in the USSR. After 1917, the Soviets had destroyed all aspects of Jewish communal, religious, cultural, and social life, resulting in a severely weakened sense of Jewish identity among Soviet Jews. The rise of a "Let My People Go" resistance movement was accompanied by the development of an underground Jewish renaissance movement, in the form of religious, cultural, and Hebrew language self-education groups. To publicize this, Birnbaum added the words "Let My People Know" (their heritage) to SSSJ's original "Let My People Go" slogan and marshaled the support of various Christian groups in annual spring campaigns in the early 1980s for the protection of these self-education groups under intense attack by the KGB. In September 1985, he organized and led a mixed delegation of Orthodox, Conservative, and Reform rabbis under the auspices of the inter-denominational Synagogue Council of America to meet with the Deputy Secretary of State.

In Montreal SSSJ was started by Robert Weisz and Abie Ingber, based in the Hillel student organization and gained wide support from community organizations. Montreal and Canadian Jewry took a leading role internationally in the struggle to free Soviet Jews.

=== Support of Post-Soviet Central Asian Jewish communities in the 1990s ===
In the 1990s, after the collapse of the Soviet empire, Birnbaum became involved in the defense of Jewish communities in the Central Asian republics which had been part of the USSR. He worked in cooperation with the Union of Councils for Soviet Jews, was frequently in contact with the Central Asian desk of the State Department, the U.S. Embassy in Tashkent and, in the later 1990s, also with Malcolm Hoenlein, by now Executive Vice Chairman of the Conference of Presidents.

For the occasion of his 80th birthday, December 10, 2006 (Human Rights Day), the U.S. House of Representatives passed HR137 in 2007 "Honoring the life and six decades of public service of Jacob Birnbaum and especially his commitment to freeing Soviet Jews from religious, cultural, and communal extinction."

== Selected bibliography ==
- Jacob Birnbaum's Chronicles of a Redemption
- Yossi Klein Halevi, The Man who Saved Soviet Jewry, Azure #17, Spring 2004.
- Gal Beckerman, When They Come for Us We'll Be Gone, Houghton Mifflin Harcourt, 2010.
- Avi Weiss, Open Up The Iron Door, Toby Press, 2015.
- Philip Spiegel, Triumph Over Tyranny, Devora Publishing, 2008.
- William Orbach, The American Movement to Aid Soviet Jews, U. of Mass. Press, 1979
- Paul Appelbaum, The Soviet Jewry Movement in the United States, in Michael Dobrowski's American Voluntary Organizations, Greenwood Press, 1986
- Dennis Prager and Joseph Telushkin, Nine Questions People Ask about Judaism. New York: Simon and Schuster, 1981 and subsequent re-issues
- Ronald I. Rubin, The Unredeemed: Anti-Semitism in the Soviet Union, Quadrangle, 1968.
- Joseph Telushkin, Jewish Literacy. New York: William Morrow, 1991
- Jonathan Mark, "Yaakov Birnbaum's Freedom Ride," New York Jewish Week, April 30, 2004: front-page article and lead editorial, on 40th anniversary of SSSJ.
- Critical reviews by Jacob Birnbaum of Al Chernin's lead chapter in A Second Exodus, of Gal Beckerman's When they Come for Us, We’ll be Gone.
- Archives of Center for Russian Jewry with Student Struggle for Soviet Jewry transferred by Jacob Birnbaum to Yeshiva University Library in 1993, including letter from Martin Gilbert to Jacob Birnbaum dated November 10, 1986. A guide to these archives may be accessed through the Library's website.

== See also ==
- Union of Councils for Soviet Jews
