= Jacob Birnbaum =

German-American Jewish activist (1926–2014)

Jacob (Yaakov) Birnbaum (10 December 1926 – 9 April 2014, aged 87) was the German-born founder of Student Struggle for Soviet Jewry (SSSJ) and other human rights organizations. Because the SSSJ, at the time of its founding, in 1964, was the first initiative to address the plight of Soviet Jewry, he is regarded as the father of the Movement to Free Soviet Jewry. His father was Solomon Birnbaum and grandfather Nathan Birnbaum.

== Early life and education ==
Yaakov Birnbaum was born in Hamburg, Germany. His grandfather was Nathan Birnbaum, writer and Jewish nationalist who coined the word "Zionism", and later a prominent figure in the Jewish religious world. His father was Solomon Birnbaum, a scholar of Yiddish and Hebrew Paleography. In 1938 and 1939 Yaakov went to school with refugee children who were brought out from Central Europe at the last moment in a Kindertransport organized by Rabbi Dr. Solomon Schonfeld. He later studied modern European history at the University of London.

== Career ==
As the war ended in 1945, Birnbaum moved to France where from 1946 to 1951 he helped survivors of Nazi concentration camps and Soviet labor camps - Jews from Poland, USSR, Czechoslovakia, Hungary. He later worked to help North African Jews fleeing the Algerian Civil War.

With his experience of Nazism and Soviet communism, Birnbaum felt that an all-out effort should be made by American Jewry to combat the Kremlin's oppression of Soviet Jews. Inspired by the organization of the Student Nonviolent Coordinating Committee, Birnbaum decided to create a national student movement to act as a spearhead to mobilize the grassroots to transform Washington into the protector and rescuer of Soviet Jewry. In 1964 he moved to New York City. On 27 April 1964 he convened a New York metropolitan student meeting at Columbia University with the aim of creating a protest on 1 May, traditionally a holiday for the Soviet Union. About 200 students from Yeshiva University, Jewish Theological Seminary, Queens College and Columbia University attended. The meeting was an emotional one. The theme was that The Holocaust should be taken as a warning and the civil rights movement as a model for grassroots action. Within four days some 1,000 students rallied in front of the Soviet U.N. Mission. He called the new group Student Struggle for Soviet Jewry (SSSJ) (a play on the Marxist term "class struggle") and his first office operated out of his bedroom. In its recent timeline of 350 years of American Jewish history, the Center for Jewish History marked 1 May 1964 as the beginning of the public movement for Soviet Jewry.

The 1960s saw the rise of student protest movements. The Student Nonviolent Coordinating Committee, the inspiration for SSSJ, eventually shed its non-violent image, and other groups arose based on civil disobedience. Recognizing the potential hazard of courting donors who wanted to avoid student activism, Birnbaum together with Irving Greenberg and Mel Stein created the non-profit Center for Soviet Jewry in 1965 in the hope that it would have more appeal donors.

Birnbaum sacrificed much for SSSJ, leading an ascetic life, even going as far as washing his clothes in the bathtub to save money by avoiding the laundry.

Birnbaum's efforts to raise general awareness of the plight of Soviet Jewry beyond the Jewish community lasted for years. A major goal was accomplished when on 6 December 1987—a day before a summit meeting before Ronald Reagan and Mikhail Gorbachev—the National Coalition Supporting Soviet Jewry (NCSJ) held a gathering of 250,000 people, including statements from human rights leaders, American presidential candidates, Morris B. Abram (NCSJ president), and a message from President Ronald Reagan. Birnbaum was given negligible attention at the event, something that embittered him for the rest of his life.

Former Soviet refusenik and Israeli politician Natan Sharansky said "Jacob was the first to start the struggle. This brought hundreds of thousands of Jews out to join him in the great struggle for Soviet Jewry, which made modern Exodus real." The movement started by Birnbaum eventually led to liberalization of Soviet emigration policies, resulting in the eventual emigration of over 1.5 million Soviet Jews.

== Personal life ==
Yaakov Birnbaum was married to the former Freda Beatrice Bluestone, who survived him.

Birnbaum donated his papers representing the Student Struggle for Soviet Jewry to Yeshiva University in 1993.

== Honors and Legacy ==
For the occasion of his 80th birthday, December 10, 2006 (Human Rights Day), the U.S. House of Representatives passed HR137 in 2007 "Honoring the life and six decades of public service of Jacob Birnbaum and especially his commitment to freeing Soviet Jews from religious, cultural, and communal extinction."

A portion of Cabrini Boulevard, in Washington Heights, New York City was renamed in his memory on 18 October 2015. Birnbaum lived in this neighborhood for over fifty years.
