= Jewish national movements =

- Zionism, seeking territorial concentration of all Jews in the Land of Israel
- Jewish Territorialism, seeking territorial concentration in any land possible
- Jewish Autonomism, seeking an ethnic-cultural autonomy for the Jews of Eastern Europe
- Yiddishism, some proponents of which regarded Yiddish-speakers as a national group
  - Bundism, which combined Yiddishist Autonomism with socialism
  - Soviet Yiddishism, promoting Yiddish-speakers as a national group in the USSR with its own Jewish Autonomous Oblast
- Diaspora nationalism, an ideology promulgated by Nathan Birnbaum
