= The Jewish State =

The Jewish State could refer to:

- The English translation of the title of Der Judenstaat – 1896 pamphlet by Theodor Herzl
- Israel

== See also ==
- Jewish national movements (disambiguation)
- Christian state – State which endorses Christianity as the state religion
- Islamic state – Government based on Islamic law
- Islamic State – Salafi jihadist militant organisation
- Legitimacy of the State of Israel – Question of whether Israeli political authority is legitimate or not
- Zionism – Movement supporting a Jewish state in Palestine
