= Diaspora nationalism =

Form of ethnic nationalism

Diaspora nationalism is a form of ethnic nationalism formed by groups of migrants who leave their homeland and live scattered across another country, while maintaining cultural and ethnic ties to the home country. This term generally refers to the Golus nationalism of the Jewish people, but diaspora-based ethnic nationalism can also arise among other ethnic groups, including Assyrians, Koreans, Kurds, and others.

Some stateless nations share a common culture and identity, but form communities of refugees, migrants, and minorities who live scattered across the world to avoid persecution by the state occupying their homelands, without having their own sovereignty and independent state.

== By ethnic groups ==
=== Armenian ===
Following the Armenian genocide, the Armenian diaspora established extensive transnational networks across Europe, the Americas, and the Middle East. Armenian diaspora nationalism focuses heavily on international recognition of the genocide, political lobbying, and support for the state of Armenia.

=== Assyrian ===
As a stateless nation, Assyrians developed a strong diaspora nationalism following persecutions such as the Assyrian genocide. Scattered across North America, Europe, and Oceania, Assyrian diaspora organizations advocate for cultural preservation, human rights, and autonomy in their ancestral homeland.

=== Jewish ===
The Jewish diaspora is widely cited as the classical archetype of diaspora nationalism, encompassing both territorial and non-territorial ideological streams. While Zionism sought national restoration through the re-establishment of a Jewish state in Palestine, Golus nationalism (diaspora autonomism) advocated for Jewish national-cultural autonomy and minority rights within host countries, explicitly opposing Zionist territorialism and the "negation of the diaspora."

=== Korean ===
During the Japanese colonial period, the division of the Korean Peninsula, and the Korean War, many Korean diasporas emerged. In particular, some ethnic Koreans were unable to assimilate into their host states due to traumatic events such as the Deportation of Koreans in the Soviet Union, the Minsaengdan incident, and the Kanto Massacre, and instead developed a strong ethno-national (minjok) identity. This nationalism is especially prominent among the Koryo-saram.

=== Kurdish ===
Displaced by conflict across their traditional homeland in the Middle East, the Kurdish diaspora—particularly in Western Europe—maintains a strong transnational political identity, advocating for Kurdish self-determination and cultural rights.

=== Palestinians ===
Following events such as the 1948 Nakba and the 1967 Six-Day War, millions of Palestinians were displaced, forming a widespread Palestinian diaspora. Diaspora-based Palestinian nationalism has played a key role in preserving a collective national identity among exile and refugee communities, centered strongly around the Palestinian right of return and transnational political advocacy for self-determination.

== See also ==
- Diaspora politics
- Provisional government
- Right of return
