= Kadima (disambiguation) =

Meaning 'forward' in Hebrew, Kadima or Kadimah may refer to:

- Cadima, a Zionist organization for the migration of Jews from Morocco to Israel (1949-1956)
- Kadima (game) or matkot, an Israeli paddle game
- 21st Century Israeli political party Kadima
- Kadima (youth group), a youth group affiliated with the United Synagogue of Conservative Judaism (USCJ)
- A village in Israel, now part of Kadima-Tzoran
- Kadimah (student association), a 19th-century proto-Zionist student association

== See also ==
- Cadima (municipality), a parish in Cantanhede, Portugal
