= David Waksberg =

David Jonathan Waksberg (born December 14, 1956, in New York City), was a leading activist in the Soviet Jewry Movement during the 1980s and early 1990s.

== Soviet Jewry activism ==
In the 1970s he became involved in the Student Struggle for Soviet Jewry. In the early 1980s he moved to California and began working for the Bay Area Council for Soviet Jews, first as Assistant Director, and later as executive director. He initiated public and political activities on behalf of Soviet Jewry, supervised research and monitoring of their welfare and coordinated financial, medical and legal aid to Refuseniks and Prisoners of Conscience trapped in the Soviet Union. During his first visit to the USSR in 1982, Waksberg was arrested and detained by the KGB while attempting, along with refusenik Yuri Chernyak, to visit Kiev refusenik Lev Elbert. He organized numerous protest demonstrations and vigils to raise public awareness of the plight of Jews in the USSR. In 1985 Waksberg became National Vice-President of BACSJ's umbrella organization, the Union of Councils for Soviet Jews. Waksberg frequently visited Jewish communities of the Soviet Union and the former Soviet states and coordinated briefings of the American travelers interested in visiting those communities.

In 1990 Waksberg took on the role of Director of the Center for Jewish Renewal, newly established by UCSJ. The mission of the CJR was to promote the renewal and development of Jewish life in the USSR and the emigration rights, human rights and resettlement needs of Jews in the Former Soviet Union. The CJR established a network of human rights and emigration bureaus in major cities of the former Soviet Union. In mid-1990s Waksberg was a member of Bay Area Council's Board of Directors and was Director of Development and Communication of the UCSJ.

== Career ==
Since 2007 Waksberg has been Chief Executive Officer of Jewish LearningWorks.
