= Menachem Birnbaum =

Menachem Birnbaum (born 1893 in Vienna, died probably 1944), was an Austrian Jewish book illustrator and portrait painter.

== Life ==
Birnbaum was the second son of the Jewish philosopher Nathan Birnbaum and his wife Rosa Korngut. Birnbaum married Ernestine (Tina) Esther Helfmann, with whom he had two children: Rafael Zwi and Hana. Birnbaum lived in Berlin from 1911 until 1914, and again from 1919 until 1933.

=== Exile, deportation and death ===
In 1933 he emigrated to the Netherlands. In the spring of 1943 he was arrested by the Gestapo along with his relatives and transported on 10 March 1943 to a Nazi concentration camp, presumably Auschwitz. Menachem was seen alive and spoken to in Auschwitz in October 1944 by a Dutch Jewish survivor, who told about it to his brother Uriel Birnbaum in Holland after WW2. He must therefore have died between October 1944 and January 27, 1945, when Auschwitz was liberated by the Soviets. His family - Tina, Rafael Zwi, and Hana Birnbaum - were killed earlier, probably in Auschwitz as well. It is likely that he died during or just before the Death March from Auschwitz in mid-January, 1945. This would mean that the theory of him dying in March 1943 in the Sobibor extermination camp is incorrect, a theory based solely on an unconfirmed assumption by the Red Cross that the trains from the German holding camp at Westerbork, Holland were sent to Sobibor on the day of his arrest and deportation.

== Works ==
- Das Hohe Lied (The High Song), Berlin 1912
- Der Aschmedaj (Humorous periodical), Berlin-Warsaw 1912
- Schlemiel (Humorous periodical), Berlin 1919-1920 (Schriftleitung des künstlerischen Teils)
- Chad Gadjo, Berlin 1920
- Chad Gadjo, Scheveningen 1935
- Menachem Birnbaum Zeigt, Den Haag 1937
- Numerous book cover/jacket designs, portrait drawings.

== Literature ==
- Kitty Zijlmans, Jüdische Künstler im Exil: Uriel und Menachem Birnbaum; in: Hans Wuerzner (Hg.), Österreichische Exilliteratur in den Niederlanden 1934-1940, Amsterdam 1986
