= Morey Schapira =

American executive and activist (born 1949)

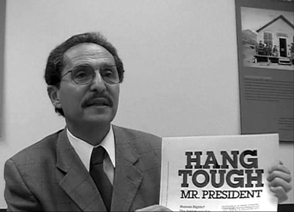
- Born: Morey Rael Schapira; 1949 (age 76–77); Chicago, Illinois U.S.
- Occupation: High Tech Executive
- Known for: Soviet Jewry activism
- Spouse: Barbara
- Children: 3

Morey Schapira (born 1949) is a Silicon Valley High Tech executive and Soviet Jewry activist leader.

== Early life ==
Schapira was born in Chicago. He resides in Sunnyvale, California.

In 1970, Schapira graduated from Case Western Reserve University with a Bachelor of Science in Physics cum laude. In 1977, he received an MBA from Harvard Business School.

== Career ==
Schapira began his career as a research scientist at Raytheon Corporation in Waltham, Massachusetts. He was at Raytheon from 1970 to 1975. In 1976, Schapira worked as a scientist at MIT Lincoln Laboratory in Lexington, Massachusetts.

In 1977, Schapira moved back to the west coast. He worked at the Hewlett Packard Company, where he was involved in various product marketing engineering positions in microwave semiconductor and optoelectronics from 1977 to 1985. Schapira spent two years at Micro Power Systems, then from 1987 to 1993 was in sales at Network General. In 1993 he worked at Digital Link Corp., from 1994 to 1997 at SmartDB Corp., from 1997 to 1999 at NetCom Systems, from 1999 to 2000 to BlueSteel Networks, Inc., and from 2000 to 2002 at Broadcom. Schapira later founded the company, REDmedic, which was purchased by BlueCross BlueShield.

== Soviet Jewry activism ==
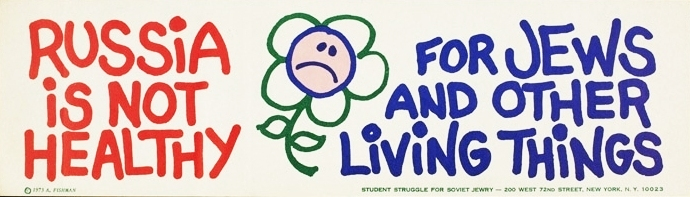
Russia is Not Healthy for Jews and other Living Things bumper sticker (from Schapira's papers)

In the late 1960s, Schapira became active in the movement to "free" Soviet Jews and quickly became a leader. In 1971 he became president of the New England Student Struggle for Soviet Jews, and became a national vice president of the Student Struggle for Soviet Jewry in 1974. While in Boston he also co-founded Action for Soviet Jewry of Boston and Medical Mobilization for Soviet Jews.

In 1973-1974 Schapira was the editor and publisher of "The Guide to Jewish Boston," one of the first Jewish City Guides in the United States.

From 1979 to 1984, Schapira was president of the Bay Area Council for Soviet Jews and from 1984 to 1986, was national president of the Union of Councils for Soviet Jews.

He regularly testified before the United States Congress; in 1986, for example, he testified before the House Committee on Foreign Affairs' Subcommittee on Europe and the Middle East.

In a lecture at Stanford University in 2004 Natan Sharansky referred to Schapira as a "Five-Star General in the Army of Students and Housewives."

== Personal life ==
Schapira is married to his wife Barbara. He has three children.
