= Ida Milgrom =

Soviet Jewish human rights activist (1908–2002)

Ida Petrovna Milgrom (1908 – 2002) helped to lead an international campaign to free her son, Soviet dissident and former Deputy Prime Minister of Israel Natan Sharansky. After her daughter-in-law was permitted to leave the Soviet Union, she continued her "nine-year battle," working from within the USSR, along with her older son Leonid.

Natan was released in 1986; Milgrom was allowed to leave later that same year.

Even after Sharansky was in Israel, "she logged thousands of miles traveling to meet with government officials" so that the remaining "thousands of Soviet dissidents and refuseniks" could also leave the Soviet Union.

== Biography ==
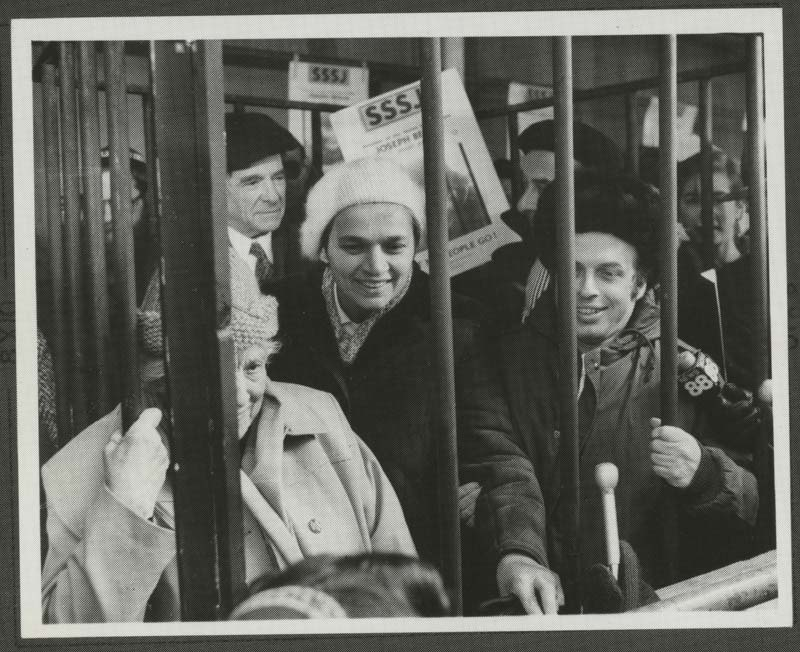
Ida Milgrom, Avital Sharansky, and Natan Sharansky

Born in 1908 in Balta, Ukraine, Ida Petrovna Milgrom was a promising pianist who "attended the Moscow Tchaikovsky Conservatory for a time." "Struck by the extraordinary music coming" from a fellow student playing, "she decided that the piano was not for her" and, at Odesa Polytechnic Institute Milgrom "trained as an engineer-economist." She served as "an economics adviser to ministers in the Ukrainian government."

Leonid described his mother as "a wise woman who taught her children to treat people with kindness."

Her husband Boris Shcharansky died in 1980. "Besides her sons, Ms. Milgrom is survived by four grandchildren."

== See also ==
- Greater New York Conference on Soviet Jewry
