= Ruben Bierer =

Ruben Bierer (Dr. Rubin Bierer, often: Reuben Bierer; born c. 1835 in Lviv; died 1931 lviv.) was a medical doctor in Sofia and one of the first pioneers of the Jewish nationalism and one of the first active zionists in Galicia and Bulgaria, adherent of Hovevei Zion in Galicia, Austria and Bulgaria.

In 1867, he was in Lviv a co-founder of the first Jewish-political association of Austria-Hungary, Shomer Israel. As an opponent against Polish assimilation of the Jews, he established, for the 1873 elections of the Reichsrat, a Jewish-Ruthenian electoral alliance. In 1879, he separated from the Shomer Israel and went to Vienna for the purpose of medical studies where he – together with Peretz Smolenskin – found the Jewish-political association Ahavath Zion (for the reason of colonisation of the holy land).

In 1882, he was a cofounder of the Viennese Kadima Studentenverbindung. In 1883 he returned to Lviv where he founded the first Jewish-national association of the Austrian east, Miqra Kodesh.

In 1885, he went to Serbia, in 1900 he returned to Lviv where he successless tried to reactivate the Shomer Israel.

Nathan Birnbaum coined the word zionism about the year 1890. But he is not the creator of this word, it was already in use, e.g. you can find in a letter of Ruben Bierer from 9 December 1888 the expression zionist brother's greeting. The word zionist is found already in the year 1877 in a Romanian written pamphlet (annual report of the order "Zion" in Bucharest).
