= Bay Area Council for Soviet Jews =

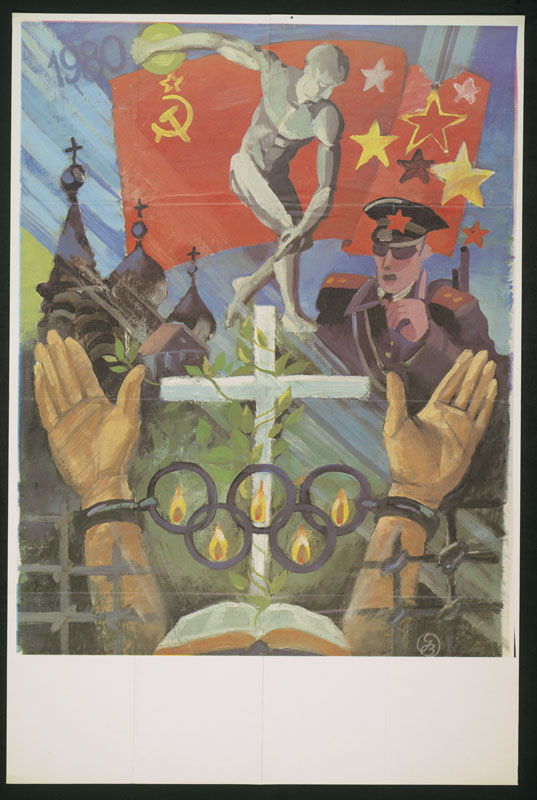
- Political poster criticizing Soviet Union's human rights violations in the year of the 1980 Summer Olympics, from the archives of BACSJ
- Abbreviation: BACSJ
- Successor: Bay Area Council For Jewish Rescue and Renewal
- Founder: Harold B. Light, Edward Tamler, Sidney Kluger, and Rabbi Moris Hershman
- Founded at: San Francisco, California
- Type: NGO
- Region served: San Francisco Bay Area

The Bay Area Council for Soviet Jews (BACSJ) was founded in 1967 by Harold B. Light, Edward Tamler, Sidney Kluger, and Rabbi Moris Hershman as a grassroots human rights organization with a mission to advocate for Soviet Jewry's freedom of religion and the right to emigrate to Israel. BACSJ was one of the largest and most active local grassroots organizations in the American Soviet Jewry movement. BACSJ was a member of the Union of Councils for Soviet Jews (UCSJ), an umbrella institution for approximately 50 organizations working on behalf of Jews in the USSR. After the fall of the Soviet Union BACSJ was renamed Bay Area Council for Jewish Rescue and Renewal and shifted its focus to monitoring the human rights conditions in countries throughout Eastern Europe and Central Asia and assisting former Soviet Jewish communities in need.

== Activities ==
Activities of the BACSJ included monitoring and reporting the conditions of Jews in the USSR, organizing protest demonstrations in front of the Soviet consulate in San Francisco, vigils and other events on behalf of Soviet Jewry, visiting and delivering spiritual and material aid to Soviet Jewish Refuseniks and Prisoners of Conscience, maintaining community-wide letter-writing and phone call campaigns, assisting recent émigrés from USSR and keeping elected officials representing Bay Area informed and involved in the movement to help Soviet Jews. In the early 1990s Bay Area Council for Jewish Rescue and Renewal helped the Union of Councils for Soviet Jews to establish human rights bureaus in the Former Soviet Union to support and protect Jews and other religious and national minorities.

== Leadership ==
Morey Schapira was president of the Bay Area Council for Soviet Jews in 1979 to 1984, and from 1984 to 1986, served as national president of its parent organization—Union of Councils for Soviet Jews. David Waksberg led the organization from the mid-1980s to early 1990s, simultaneously holding leadership positions in the UCSJ.
