= Never Alone: Prison, Politics, and My People =

Never Alone: Prison, Politics, and My People is a book by the Soviet-Israeli activist and politician Natan Sharansky and Gil Troy about Sharansky's political activity and how his personal experience influenced it. In particular it relates how during his long time as a political prisoner in prison in the Soviet Union, often in solitary confinement, he was able to prepare himself for prominence in public after his release.

== Bibliography ==
- Sharansky, Natan. (2020). Never Alone: Prison, Politics, and My People. ISBN 978-1-5417-4242-0
