= Solomon Birnbaum =

Austrian Yiddish linguist and Hebrew paleographer

Solomon Asher Birnbaum, also Salomo Birnbaum (Yiddish: שלמה בירנבוים Shloyme Birnboym, December 24, 1891 – December 28, 1989) was a Yiddish linguist and Hebrew palaeographer who was born in Vienna and died in Toronto.

== Early life and education ==
Birnbaum, born in Vienna, was the oldest son of Nathan Birnbaum and Rosa Korngut. He was an Austrian Jew of West Galician descent.

Solomon Birnbaum served in World War I in the Austro-Hungarian Army, and then studied and attained a doctorate from the University of Würzburg, specializing in languages of Asia. From 1922 to 1933, he was an external lecturer of Yiddish at the University of Hamburg. After the rise of the Nazi Party in Germany, in 1933 Birnbaum emigrated to Great Britain with his wife, Irene Grünwald, and his children, in 1933.

== Career ==
From 1936 to 1957, Birnbaum was a lecturer on Hebrew paleography and epigraphy at the School of Oriental and African Studies of the University of London. He taught Yiddish at the same time at the School of Slavonic and East European Studies of the University of London, from 1939 to 1958. During World War II, Birnbaum worked in the postal censorship for the British authorities. In 1970, he immigrated to Toronto, Canada.

Solomon Birnbaum is the father of Jacob Birnbaum, who, after his emigration to New York in 1963, helped to found the Soviet Jewry Movement.

== Publications ==
- Praktische Grammatik der jiddischen Sprache, Vienna and Leipzig, 1918; Grammatik der jiddischen Sprache, Hamburg: editions 1966, 1979, 1984, 1988
- Leben und Worte des Balschemm, 1920
- Das hebräische und aramäische Element in der jiddischen Sprache, 1921 (dissertation)
- "Die jiddische Sprache," in: Germanisch-Romanische Monatsschrift (1923)
- "Die Umschrift des Jiddischen," in: Teuthonista (1933)
- "The Age of the Yiddish Language," in: Transactions of the Philological Society, London (1939)
- "Jewish Languages," in: Essays in Honour of the Very Rev. Dr. J.H. Hertz, London, 1942
- Yiddish Phrase Book, published by The Linguaphone Institute for The Jewish Committee for Relief Abroad, London, 1945
- "The Cultural Structure of East Ashkenazic Jewry," in: The Slavonic and East European Review, London (1946)
- "The Verb in the Bukharic Language of Samarkand," in: Archivum Linguisticum, 2 (1950/51)
- "How Old are the Cave Manuscripts?" in: Vetus Testamentum (1951)
- The Hebrew Scripts, 2 vols., Leiden, 1954–57, 1971
- Die jiddische Sprache, Hamburg 1974, 1986, 1997
- Yiddish – A Survey and a Grammar, Toronto, 1979
- "Zur Geschichte der u-Laute im Jiddischen," in: Zeitschrift für Deutsche Philologie (1981)
- Yiddish, A Survey and a Grammar, 2nd edition, with additional essays etc by David Birnbaum, Eleazar Birnbaum, Kalman Weiser, Jean Baumgarten. Toronto, 2016
