= Kadimah (student association) =

Jewish student association in Vienna

Kadimah (Hebrew: קדימה, lit. Onward) (German: A.V. Kadima Wien) was the first Jewish student association in Vienna, founded many years before Theodor Herzl became the leading spokesman of the Zionist movement.

== History ==
The national Jewish and Zionist Kadimah was founded by Nathan Birnbaum together with Moses Schnirer, Ruben Bierer and Peretz Smolenskin in Vienna on 25 October 1882.

Well-known members of Kadimah include Sigmund Freud, Isidor Schalit and Fritz Löhner-Beda.

Members of the Kadimah founded the Jewish studentenverbindung Hasmonaea Czernowitz in 1891, Moriah Vienna in 1893 and Barissia Radautz in 1912.

This movement was founded by Galician students in Vienne, but dominated by Western Jews around 1900.

Kadimah itself was liquidated by then Nazi-ruled official authorities in August 1938.
