= Chistopol =

Town in the Republic of Tatarstan, Russia

Chistopol Чистополь
- Town
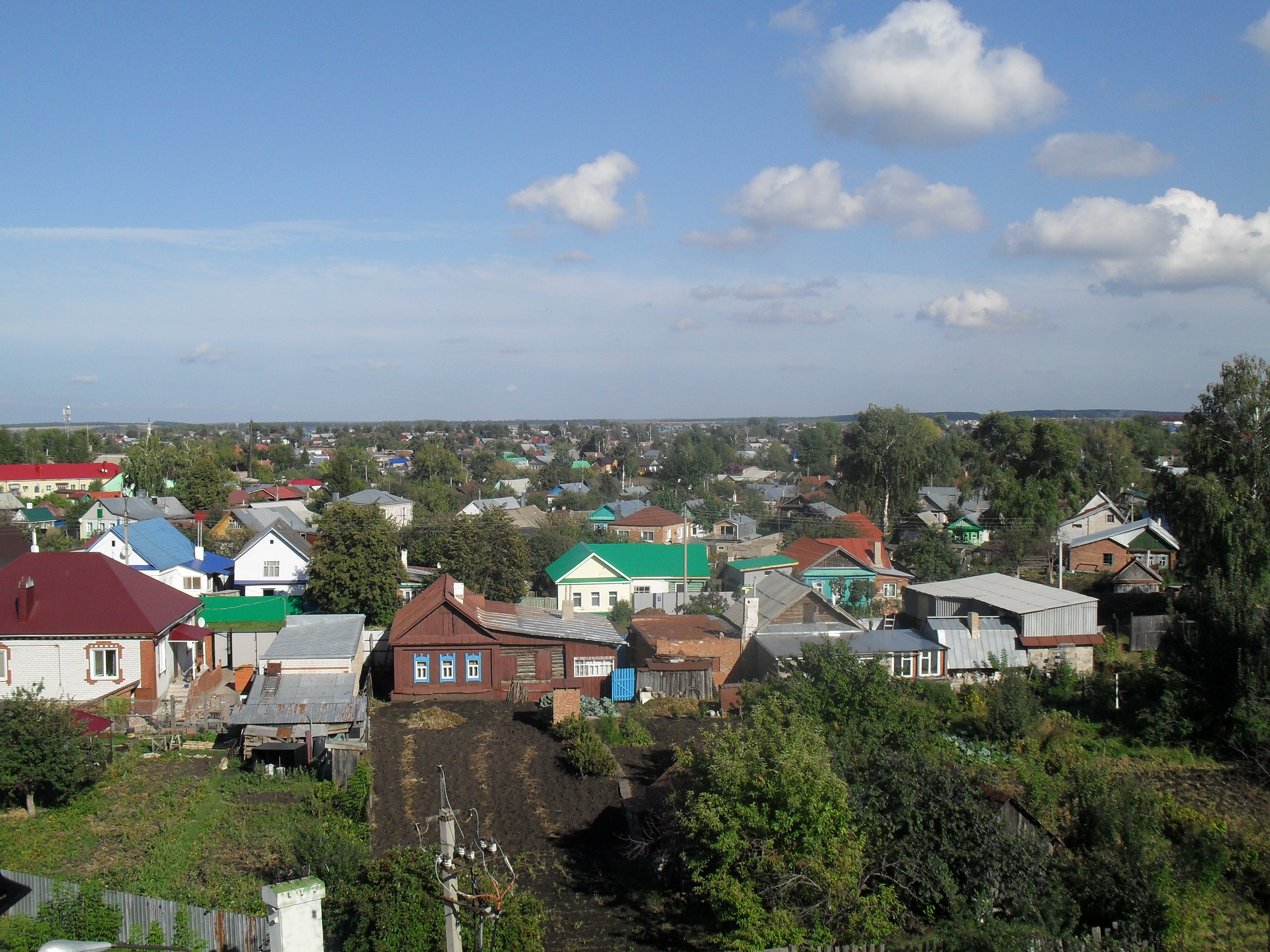
- View of Chistopol

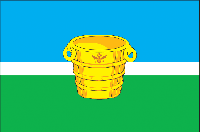
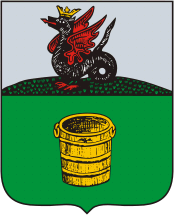
- Flag Coat of arms
- Interactive map of Chistopol
- Location of Chistopol Chistopol (Tatarstan)
- Coordinates: 55°21′53″N 50°37′34″E
- Country: Russia
- Federal subject: Tatarstan
- First mentioned: the end of the 17th century
- Town status since: 1781
- Elevation: 100 m (330 ft)

Population (2010 Census)
  - Total: 60,755
  - Estimate (2025): 57,844 (−4.8%)
  - Rank: 268th in 2010

Administrative status
  - Subordinated to: town of republic significance of Chistopol
  - Capital of: town of republic significance of Chistopol, Chistopolsky District

Municipal status
  - Municipal district: Chistopolsky Municipal District
  - Urban settlement: Chistopol Urban Settlement
  - Capital of: Chistopolsky Municipal District, Chistopol Urban Settlement
- Time zone: UTC+3 (MSK)
- Postal codes: 422980–422986, 422988, 422999
- Dialing code: +7 84342
- OKTMO ID: 92659101001
- Website: chistopol.tatarstan.ru

Chistopol population
- 2010 Census: 60,755
- 2002 Census: 63,029
- 1989 Census: 65,468
- 1979 Census: 64,285

Chistopol (Russian: Чи́стополь; Tatar: Чистай; Chuvash: Чистай, Çistay) is a town in Tatarstan, Russia, located on the left bank of the Kuybyshev Reservoir, on the Kama River. As of the 2010 Census, its population was 60,755.

== History ==
At the end of the 19th century, Chistopol became a major center of trade for grain. Prior to 1917, it was the second largest town (after Kazan) in Kazan Governorate.

During the Great Patriotic War, Chistopol become a shelter for the Union of Soviet Writers, which included Boris Pasternak, Leonid Leonov and other notables.

Between 1918 and the 1950s the bodies of those who died or were executed in the city prison were concealed in the city graveyard. In 2006 the council erected a monument to them there.

The town is notable for its Vostok watches factory, which was founded in 1942.

Chistopol was ranked first among Category III cities (population up to 100,000) in the 2015 edition of Most Comfortable City in Russia.

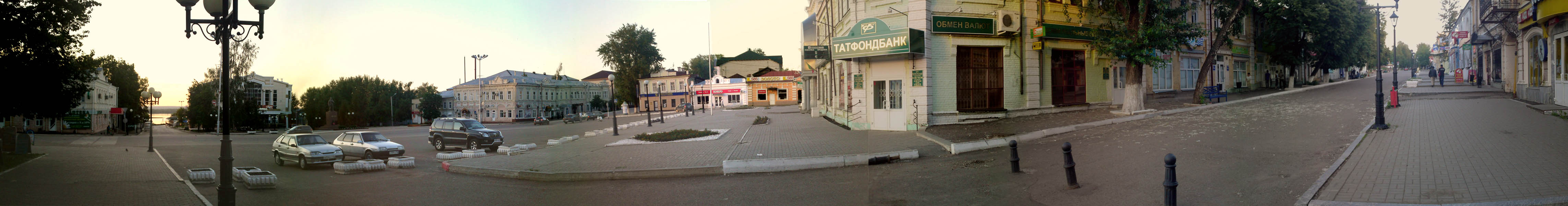
Panorama of the central part of Chistopol

In the year 1781, Empress Catherine the Great established the center of the "Chistopol District of the Kazan Governorate" (Rusmania). In the 19th century, the city flourished in grain production. Nearly half of its lands were used for grain production along with trade. Its location and docks allowed for many resources and in due time, it became the second largest city in the Kazan Governorate (Rusmania). Following World War 2, many acclaimed writers were placed in Chistopol. Not long after this, a crucial watch factory was also transferred to the city in 1942. ‘Vostok’ watches are now very prominent in the town. Since then, the city has preserved its 19th century feel and remains a historical center.

== Administrative and municipal status ==
Within the framework of administrative divisions, Chistopol serves as the administrative center of Chistopolsky District, even though it is not a part of it. As an administrative division, it is, together with one rural locality (the settlement of Yeryklinsky), incorporated separately as the town of republic significance of Chistopol—an administrative unit with the status equal to that of the districts. As a municipal division, the town of republic significance of Chistopol is incorporated within Chistopolsky Municipal District as Chistopol Urban Settlement.

== Transportation ==
The town is served by Chistopol Airport.

== Notable people ==
- Alexander Butlerov, born in Chistopol, chemist
- Sofia Gubaidulina, born in Chistopol, composer
- Nikolay Likhachyov, born in Chistopol, scientist
- Anatoly Marchenko, died in Chistopol, dissident
- Boris Pasternak, evacuated to Chistopol during the second world war, writer
- Vazif Meylanov, incarcerated in Chistopol, dissident
