= Uriel Birnbaum =

Austrian artist (1894–1956)

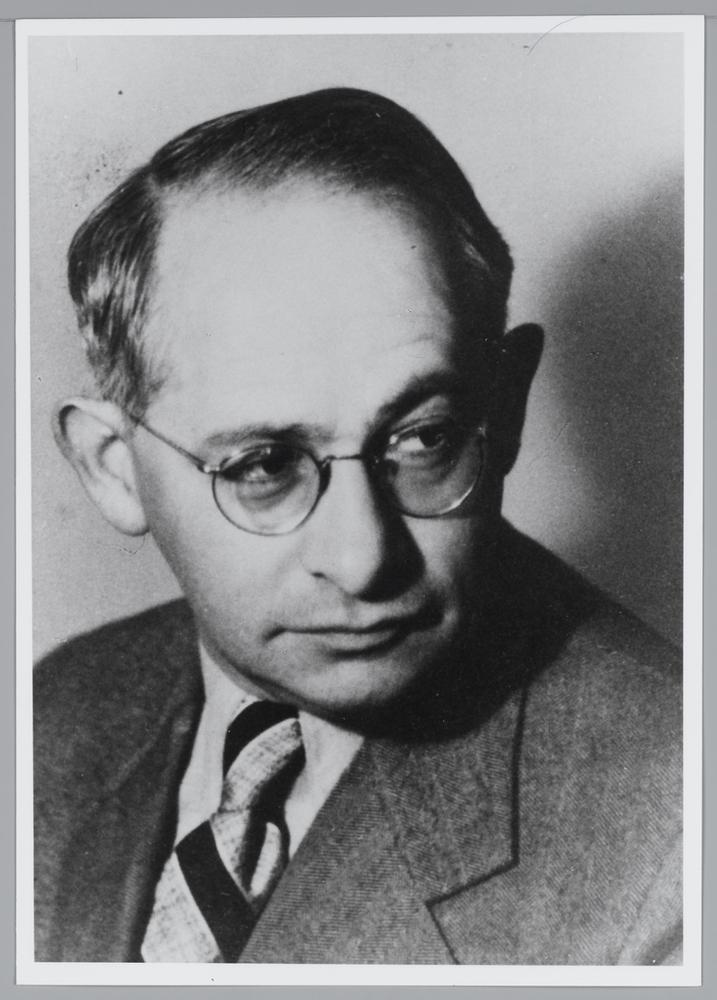
Uriel Birnbaum, 1947

Uriel Birnbaum (November 13, 1894, in Vienna − December 9, 1956, in Amersfoort, Netherlands) was an Austrian painter, caricaturist, writer and poet.

== Biography ==
Birnbaum was the youngest son of Nathan Birnbaum, a Jewish philosopher, and Rosa Korngut. Reportedly, his art education consisted of only one month at a Berlin art school in 1913. He served in the Austro-Hungarian Common Army during World War I as a lieutenant in the k.u.k. Feldjäger Battalion No. 17, and was severely injured during the Eleventh Battle of the Isonzo where he completely lost one foot, and "shattered" the other; he used a wheelchair thereafter.

He illustrated a number of books, including works of Edgar Allan Poe, Lewis Carroll's Through the Looking-Glass (Alice im Spiegelglass, Vienna, 1923), and his own Weltuntergang (1921).

Birnbaum survived the Nazi period at first due to the special status conferred to him by his non-Jewish wife (the Nazi concept of geschützte Mischehe, "protected mix-race marriage"; German article here), and then by going into hiding from 1943 until the end of the war in 1945.
