= Golus nationalism =

Form of Jewish nationalism that takes pride in the diaspora over Zionism

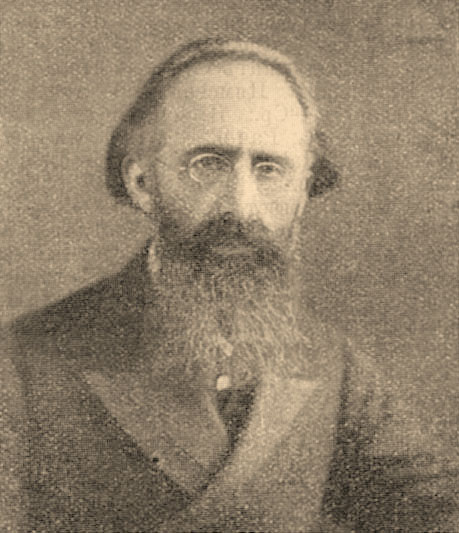
Nathan Birnbaum in the 1910s, the main thinker and activist behind Diaspora Nationalism.

Golus nationalism (Yiddish: גלות נאַציאָנאַליזם, romanized: Golus natsionalizm; Hebrew: לאומיות גלות, romanized: Leumiyút gālūṯ), or diaspora nationalism, is a national movement of the Jewish people that advocates the furtherance of Jewish national and cultural life in centers of large Jewish communities throughout the world and simultaneously seeks recognition of a Jewish national identity from world powers. The term golus has been understood to mean both "Jewish diaspora" and "exile".

== Origins ==
Golus nationalism was conceived of by Nathan Birnbaum (1864–1937): the Austrian philosopher who had given Zionism its name. Although Birnbaum was an early Zionist theorist who participated in the First Zionist Congress (1897), he broke with the movement shortly thereafter. Birnbaum began to develop a form of pan-Judaism (Alljudentum) that embraced Jewish life in the Diaspora.

Birnbaum studied Yiddish, and he was interested in the degree to which Eastern European Jewry preserved its internal culture relative to the Western European Jewish culture in which he was raised. Birnbaum was a co-founder of the Jewish-nationalist group Kadimah, and he also founded and wrote articles in the first Zionist emancipation journal, Selbst-Emancipation. Some of his thinking is represented in two articles entitled "The Jewish Renaissance Movement" and "Jewish Autonomy."

Birnbaum did not believe that Jewish assimilation was inevitable. Instead, he was inspired by the Jews of Eastern Europe who had retained Yiddish as a language, had a robust folk culture, and banded together in recognizably distinct communities.

== Seeking recognition for the existence of a Jewish nationality ==
Birnbaum made several attempts to convince state powers to recognize the existence of a Jewish national identity. In 1907, he unsuccessfully advocated for the inclusion of Yiddish as a Jewish national language in the Austro-Hungarian census. The following year, he ran a campaign for a seat in Parliament; despite his successful campaign, he failed to take his seat owing to local government corruption. In 1910, he again attempted to have Yiddish recognized. Birnbaum felt that if he could get state recognition for elements of Jewish nationhood, he could petition for Jews to have shared control of a province in Galicia. He was encouraged by the fact that the Austro-Hungarian Empire was offering the possibility of autonomous regions to ethnic groups and nationalities.

Birnbaum also propagandized on behalf of Jews who believed that Yiddish should be recognized as a language, coining the words "Yiddishism" and "Yiddishist." He organized Yiddish events in Vienna, translated Yiddish authors into German, and in 1905 established a student organization for the furtherance of the language called Yidishe Kultur. In 1908, he organized an international conference on the Yiddish language in Czernowitz, in which different Jewish factions squared off as to whether Yiddish should be declared the official language of Jewish nationalism or instead one of several Jewish languages.

== Related theories ==
Around the 1880s, Birnbaum reportedly became resentful of Theodor Herzl, who lacked interest in sustaining and reviving Jewish diasporic culture and favored the use of political strategy for the purpose of establishing sovereignty and a separate territory for Jews. This rift caused Birnbaum to diverge from the territorial Zionist ideologies that were advocated by Herzl and others, and in response, he joined the ranks of the non-territorial autonomist theorists, who argued that physical boundaries are not necessary for a group of people that seeks to define itself and maintain its sovereignty. Birnbaum supported a renaissance of the Ashkenazi Jewish culture and language. His theories aligned with Simon Dubnow's concept of Diaspora nationalism, emphasizing a Jewish sense of unity, identity, and sovereignty across countries and international communities.

There was a division between Cultural Zionists, who were represented by Ahad Ha'am, and Political Zionists, who Theodor Herzl represented; Nathan Birnbaum's ideas were in opposition to both ideologies. He did not require a territory to maintain a national identity. Birnbaum's ideas also countered Ahad Ha'am's because he did not place as much significance on the Land of Israel as carrying the spirit of Judaism.

Birnbaum's notions drew from the concept of Alljudentum, or "pan-Judaism", which was initially theorized by Birnbaum's colleague, Fritz Mordecai Kaufmann. Kaufmann was from Western Europe, specifically Eschweiler, and he studied medicine and history in Geneva. Like Birnbaum, Kaufmann was very motivated to learn from and about the cultural preservation and traditional practices maintained by Eastern European Jews. He sought to apply that unity through his nationalistic visions for the Jewish diaspora. However, Kaufmann's views diverged from Birnbaum's in that he focused more on the socialistic aspects of these communities rather than the modern Orthodox practices that drew Birnbaum's attention.
