= Fear No Evil (book) =

1988 book by Natan Sharansky

Fear No Evil The Classic Memoir of One Man's Triumph over a Police State
- First edition bookcover
- Author: Natan Sharansky
- Translator: Stefani Hoffman
- Language: English
- Genre: Autobiography
- Publisher: Random House
- Publication date: January 1, 1988
- Publication place: United States
- Media type: Print
- Pages: 472 pp. (first edition, hardback)
- OCLC: 569339825
- Followed by: The Case for Democracy

Fear No Evil is a book by the Soviet-Israeli activist and politician Natan Sharansky about his struggle to immigrate to Israel from the former Soviet Union (USSR). The book tells the story of the Jewish refuseniks in the USSR in the 1970s, his show trial on charges of espionage, incarceration by the KGB and liberation.

== Awards ==
1989: National Jewish Book Awards for biography, autobiography and memoir

== Bibliography ==
- Sharansky, Natan. (1988). Fear No Evil. ISBN 0-297-79382-9.
