= Avital Sharansky =

Soviet-Israeli human rights activist (born 1950)

- אביטל שרנסקי
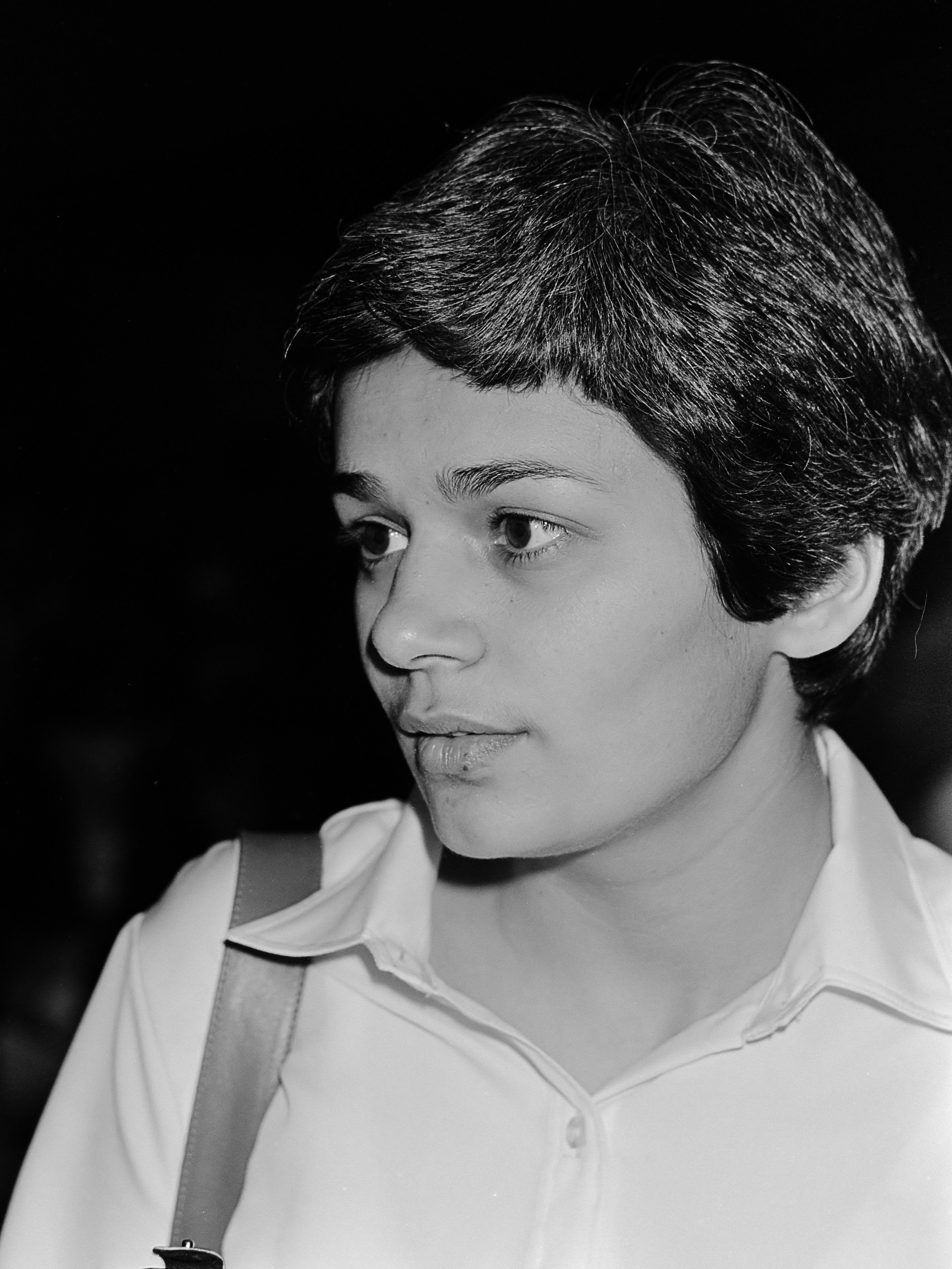
- Avital Sharansky in 1980
- Born: Natalia Stieglitz; 1950 (age 75–76); Kyiv, Ukraine, Soviet Union
- Citizenship: Israeli
- Known for: Activism on behalf of her husband, Natan
- Spouse: Natan Sharansky (m. 1974)
- Children: 2

Avital Sharansky (Note: Also spelled Shcharansky.) (Hebrew: אביטל שרנסקי; birth name Natalia Stieglitz; (Note: Russian: Наталья Штиглиц, romanized: Natalya Shtiglists, also spelled Natalya Shteiglitz; Ukrainian: Наталія Стігліц.) born 1950) is a former activist and public figure in the Soviet Jewry movement who fought for the release of her husband, Natan Sharansky, from Soviet imprisonment.

== Early life ==
Natalia Stieglitz was born in Kyiv, Ukraine, in the Soviet Union, in 1950. She was 14 years old when she found out that she was Jewish.

== Activism ==
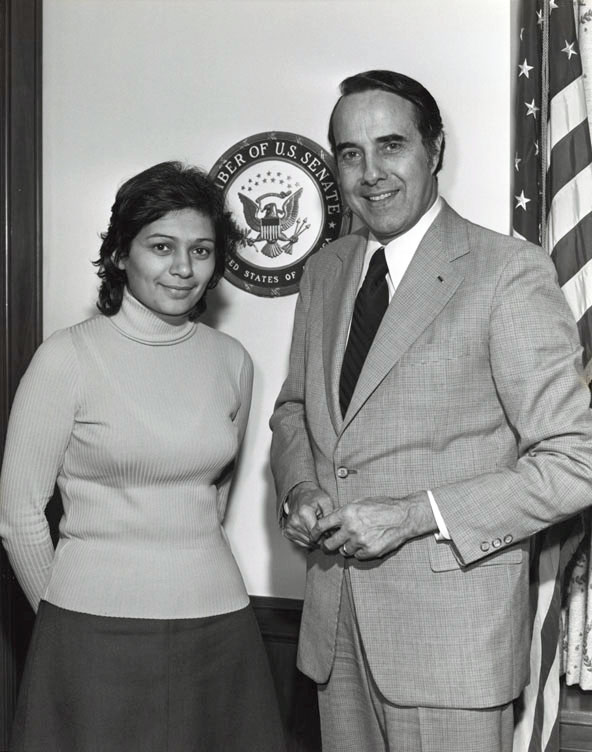
Avital Sharansky with Senator Bob Dole

Natalia Stieglitz and Nathan Sharansky met in October 1973. Shortly after meeting, Nathan Sharansky's exit visa was denied, and he became an active refusenik. Natalia applied for a visa to Israel, and the couple began to discuss marriage. They married in July 1974, one day and a half before Natalia's exit visa expired. On the day after their wedding, Natalia left for Israel while Nathan remained in the Soviet Union. He was imprisoned in 1977 on charges of high treason.

In Israel, Natalia changed her name to Avital and began to campaign for her husband's release. In the fall of 1975, she made her first trip to the United States and Canada with the help of activists from the Union of Councils. During this time, she met with members of Congress. In 1978, Nathan was sentenced to 13 years of forced labor. The reaction catapulted the Sharanskys into the spotlight as figures of the Soviet Jewry movement. Gal Beckerman writes:

Shcharansky's trial and conviction unleashed a wave of support. Dozens of petitions were signed. Committees were established on university campuses and in Congress. The thirty-five-thousand-member Association for Computing Machinery cut all ties with the Soviet Union. By the end of 1978, twenty-four hundred American scientists--including thirteen Nobel laureates as well as researchers representing the leading scientific institutions--had joined on to a "statement of conscience," pledging to avoid all cooperation with the Soviet Union until Orlov and Shcharansky were freed. Avital's celebrity reached new heights. She found herself in the Rayburn House hearing room on Capitol Hill surrounded by lawmakers climbing over one another to issue the most indignant statements and the angriest proclamations about what should be done in retaliation. [...] Avital had met with Cyrus Vance, the secretary of state, and UN ambassador Andrew Young the day after the verdict was announced, and on July 17, she was ushered into the White House for a half-hour meeting with Walter Mondale, the vice president. [...] He praised her for her "courage, dignity and strength" and then referred to Shcharansky's final speech at the trial, saying that it would "go down in literature as a great statement by an oppressed person."

For years after Nathan's sentence, Avital met with government leaders in the United States and around the world. In 1979, Avital published a book on the couple's struggle: Next Year in Jerusalem.

The struggle of the Sharanskys was picked up particularly in New York. During Nathan Sharansky's trial, a sign reading "Free Shcharansky" was lit up on Times Square.

Avital's activism on behalf of her husband was aided by many, including Rabbi Avi Weiss, Rabbi Ronald Greenwald, and others.

Nathan Sharansky was released on February 11, 1986, after which Avital stepped away from public life. The Sharanskys live in Israel, where they raised their daughters, Rachel and Hannah.

== Awards ==
2013: Emma Lazarus Statue of Liberty Award

== Works ==
"Next Year in Jerusalem", Published by William Morrow & Co. in 1979. Sharansky titled the book based on what Natan said to her at his trial when he was found guilty of being a CIA spy.
