= Nathan Birnbaum =

Austrian philosopher (1864–1937)

- נתן בירנבוים
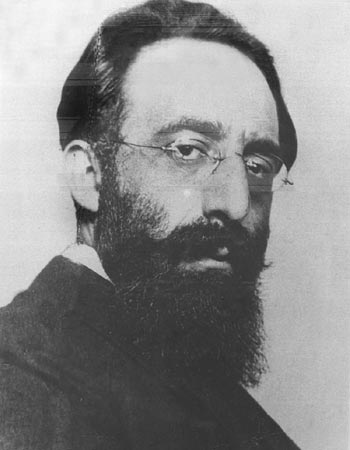
- Born: Nathan Birnbaum; 25 April 1864; Vienna, Austrian Empire
- Died: 4 April 1937 (aged 72); Scheveningen, Netherlands
- Occupations: Writer and journalist
- Writing career
- Pen name: Mathias Acher; Dr. N. Birner; Mathias Palme; Anton Skart; Theodor Schwarz; Pantarhei

Nathan Birnbaum (Hebrew: נתן בירנבוים; pseudonyms: "Mathias Acher", "Dr. N. Birner", "Mathias Palme", "Anton Skart", "Theodor Schwarz", and "Pantarhei"; 25 April 1864 – 4 April 1937) was an Austrian writer and journalist, Jewish thinker and nationalist. His life had three main phases, representing a progression in his thinking: a Zionist phase (c. 1883 – c. 1900); a Jewish cultural autonomy phase (c. 1900 – c. 1914), which included the promotion of the Yiddish language; and a religious phase (c. 1914–1937), when he turned to Orthodox Judaism and became staunchly anti-Zionist.

He married Rosa Korngut (1869–1934) and they had three sons: Solomon (Salomo) (1891–1989), Menachem (1893–1944), and Uriel (1894–1956).

== Early life ==
Birnbaum was born in Vienna into an Eastern European Jewish family with roots in Austrian Galicia and Hungary. His father, Menachem Mendel Birnbaum, a merchant, hailed from Ropshitz, Galicia (now Poland), and his mother, Miriam Birnbaum (née Seelenfreund), who was born in Carpathian Rus (now Ukraine), of a family with illustrious rabbinic lineage, had moved as a child to Tarnow, Galicia, where the two met and married.

From 1882 to 1886, Birnbaum studied law, philosophy and Near Eastern studies at the University of Vienna.

== Zionism ==
In 1883, at the age of 19, he founded Kadimah, the first Jewish (Zionist) student association in Vienna, many years before Theodor Herzl became the leading spokesman of the Zionist movement. While still a student, he founded and published the periodical Selbstemanzipation!, often written in large part by Birnbaum himself. In it he coined the terms "Zionistic", "Zionist", "Zionism" (1890), and "political Zionism" (1892).

Birnbaum played a prominent part in the First Zionist Congress (1897) where he was elected Secretary-General of the Zionist Organization. He was associated with and was one of the most important representatives of the cultural, rather than political, side of Zionism. However, he left the Zionist Organization not long after the Congress. He was unhappy with its negative view of Diaspora Jewry and the transformation of the Zionist ideals into a party machine.

His next phase was to advocate Jewish cultural autonomy, or Golus nationalism, concentrating in particular on the Jews of eastern Europe. He advocated for the Jews to be recognized as a people among the other peoples of the empire, with Yiddish as their official language. He ran (in Buczacz, eastern Galicia) on behalf of the Jews (and with the support of the local Ukrainians) as candidate for the Austrian parliament. Although he had a majority of the votes, his election was thwarted by corruption of the electoral process by the local Polish faction.

He was chief convener of the Conference for the Yiddish Language held in Czernowitz, August 30 –September 3, 1908. It was the first Yiddish-language conference ever to take place. At the conference, he took the place of his colleague and fellow Yiddish activist Sholem Aleichem who was critically ill.

From about 1912 onwards, Birnbaum became increasingly interested in Orthodox Judaism, and he became a fully observant Orthodox Jew in about 1916. He continued to act particularly as an advocate for the Jews of eastern Europe and the Yiddish language. From 1919 to 1922, he was General Secretary of the Agudas Yisroel, a widely-spread and influential Orthodox Jewish organization. He founded the society of the "Olim" (Hebrew for the "Ascenders"), a society with a specific program of action dedicated to the spiritual ascent of the Jewish people.

== Anti-Zionism ==
Birnbaum, decrying political Zionism, 1919:

And is it at all possible that we, who regard Judaism as our one and only treasure, should ever be able to compete with such expert demagogues and loud self-advertisers as they [the Zionists]? It is surely not necessary that we should. We are, after all, still the mountains and they the grain, and all we need to do is to gather all our forces in a world organization of religious Jews, and it will follow of itself, and without the application of any great political cunning on our part, that we shall have it in our power to prevent what needs to be prevented and to carry out what we have to carry out. But there is no need to first create this world organization of religious Jews. It is already in existence. The world knows its name, it is Agudas Yisroel [The Union of Israel].

He continued to write and lecture. His most well-known publication of this period of his life was Gottes Volk, "God's People" (1918, in German), translated in 1921 to Yiddish, in 1946 to English as "Confession" (slightly abridged), and in 1948 to Hebrew as "Am Hashem".

In 1933, at the time of the Nazi rise to power, Birnbaum and part of his family were living in Berlin. They fled together to Scheveningen in the Netherlands, with the help of businessman and diplomat Henri B. van Leeuwen (1888-1973) - Birnbaum, his wife, and their son Menachem, an artist, along with his own family. There, Birnbaum, van Leeuwen, and banker Daniel Wolfe published the anti-Zionist newspaper "Der Ruf" ("The Call") While Menachem and his family were murdered by the Nazis in 1944-45, another son, Solomon (professor of Yiddish and Hebrew palaeography) and his family managed to flee from Hamburg to England. Their third son, Uriel, an artist and poet, together with his family fled from Vienna to the Netherlands in 1939. Van Leeuwen, also an Orthodox Jew, became a Dutch anti-Zionist leader and Bergen-Belsen survivor.

Birnbaum died in Scheveningen on 4 April 1937 after a period of severe illness, 3 weeks before his 73rd birthday.

== Published works ==
- "In bondage to our fellow Jews", 1919, from Nathan Birnbaum, Series of Essays on Agudas Yisroel, London, 1944, reproduced in Michael Selzer, editor, Zionism Reconsidered, Macmillan, London, 1970.
- Selbstemanzipation! Periodical. Vienna, 1885–1894. (ed., numerous articles). See above in text.
- Die jüdische Moderne; (Schulze) Leipzig, 1896,
- Ausgewählte Schriften zur jüdischen Frage, 2 Bände, 1910.
- Den Ostjuden Ihr Recht!; (Löwit) Vienna, 1915,
- Gottes Volk; (Löwit) Vienna, 1918,
- Um die Ewigkeit. Jüdische Essays; (Welt) Berlin, 1920,
- Im Dienste der Verheissung, Frankfurt 1927.
- Der Aufstieg (periodical); Berlin and Vienna, Jan. 1930 - Dec. 1932.
- Solomon A. Birnbaum (ed): The Bridge, London, 1956.
- Confession, New York, 1946. Translation (abridged) of Gottes Volk.
- From Freethinker to Believer in: Lucy Dawidowicz: The Golden Tradition, New York, 1967. Translation of Vom Freigeist zum Glaubigen, Zürich, 1919.
- Shloimy Birnboim (ed) Ais Laasys - Giklibene Ksuvim fun Nusn Birnboim, Lodz, 1939. (Yiddish). Selected essays.
- Die Freistatt (periodical). Eschweiler, 1913–1914. Numerous articles.
- An'iberblik iber maan lebn in: Orlean, Y.L. and Hasofer, N. (eds):Yubileyum Bukh zum zektsiktn Giburtstug fun Dr. Nusn Birnboim. Yeshurun, Warsaw, 1925. Yiddish.

== See also ==
- Theodor Herzl
- Timeline of Zionism
