= Natan Sharansky =

Israeli politician and refusenik (born 1948)

- נתן שרנסקי
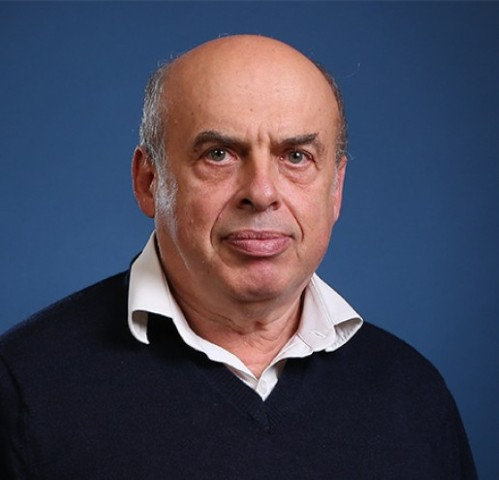
- Sharansky in 2019

Ministerial roles
- 1996–1999: Minister of Industry and Trade
- 1999–2000: Minister of Internal Affairs
- 2001–2003: Deputy Prime Minister
- 2001–2003: Minister of Housing & Construction
- 2003–2005: Minister of Jerusalem Affairs

Faction represented in the Knesset
- 1996–2003: Yisrael BaAliyah
- 2006: Likud

Personal details
- Born: Anatoly Borisovich Shcharansky; 20 January 1948 (age 78) Stalino, Ukrainian SSR, Soviet Union
- Citizenship: Israeli
- Spouse: Avital Stieglitz (m. 1974)
- Education: Moscow Institute of Physics and Technology (BMath)

Natan Sharansky (Note: Hebrew: נתן שרנסקי; Russian: Натан Щаранский; Ukrainian: Натан Щаранський) (Note: Born Anatoly Borisovich Shcharansky (Russian: Анатолий Борисович Щаранский; Ukrainian: Анатолій Борисович Щаранський)) (Hebrew: נתן שרנסקי; born 20 January 1948) is a Ukrainian-born Israeli politician, professional chess player, and author. He served as Chairman of the Executive for the Jewish Agency from June 2009 to August 2018, and currently serves as Chairman for the Institute for the Study of Global Antisemitism and Policy (ISGAP), an American non-partisan organization. A former Soviet dissident, he spent nine years imprisoned as a refusenik during the 1970s and 1980s.

== Biography ==
Sharansky was born into a Jewish family on 20 January 1948 in the city of Stalino, Ukrainian Soviet Socialist Republic (now Donetsk, Ukraine) in the Soviet Union.

His father, Boris Shcharansky, a journalist from a Zionist background who worked for an industrial journal,

His mother, Ida Milgrom, visited him in prison and stubbornly waged a nine-year battle for her son's release from Soviet prison and labor camps along with his wife. She was permitted to follow her son to Israel six months after he left the Soviet Union.

He attended physics and mathematics high school No.17 in Donetsk. As a child, he was a chess prodigy. He performed in simultaneous and blindfold exhibitions, usually against adults. At the age of 15, he won the championship in his native Donetsk. Sharansky graduated with a degree in applied mathematics from Moscow Institute of Physics and Technology. When incarcerated in solitary confinement, he maintained his sanity by playing chess against himself in his mind. Sharansky beat the world chess champion Garry Kasparov in a simultaneous exhibition in Israel in 1996.

After Sharansky graduated from university, he began working for a secret state research laboratory. Sharansky lived near Sokolniki Park, on Kolodezniy Pereulok in Moscow. In his spare time, Sharansky would coach young chess players at the famous chess club in the park.

He took his current Hebrew name in 1986 when he was freed from Soviet incarceration as part of a prisoner exchange and received an Israeli passport with his new name.

Natan Sharansky is married to Avital and their daughters are Rachel and Hannah. In the Soviet Union, his application to marry Avital was denied by the authorities. They were married in a friend's apartment, in a ceremony not recognized by the government, as the USSR only recognized civil marriage and not religious marriage.

== Arrest and imprisonment ==
Sharansky was denied an exit visa to Israel in 1973. The reason given for denial of the visa was that he was given access, at some point in his career, to information vital to Soviet national security and could not now be allowed to leave. After becoming a refusenik, Sharansky became a human rights activist, working as a translator for dissident and nuclear physicist Andrei Sakharov, and spokesman for the Moscow Helsinki Group and a leader for the rights of refuseniks. On 15 March 1977 Sharansky was arrested by the KGB, then headed by Yuri Andropov, on multiple charges, including high treason and spying for several Americans. The accusation stated that he passed to the West lists of over 1,300 refuseniks, many of whom were denied exit visas because of their knowledge of state secrets, which resulted in a publication by Robert C. Toth, "Russ Indirectly Reveal 'State Secrets': Clues in Denials of Jewish Visas". High treason carried the death penalty. The following year, in 1978, he was sentenced to 13 years of forced labor.

Sharansky spent time in Moscow's Lefortovo Prison, followed by Vladimir and Chistopol prisons, where for part of the time he was placed in solitary confinement. His health deteriorated, to the point of endangering his life. Later he was detained in Perm 35, a post-Stalin-Gulag-type so-called "strict regimen colony" in Perm Oblast.

During his imprisonment, he embarked on hunger strikes to protest confiscation of his mail, and he was force-fed at least 35 times, which he describes as "a sort of torture". Sharansky later opposed force-feeding of Palestinian detainees.

== Release from detention ==
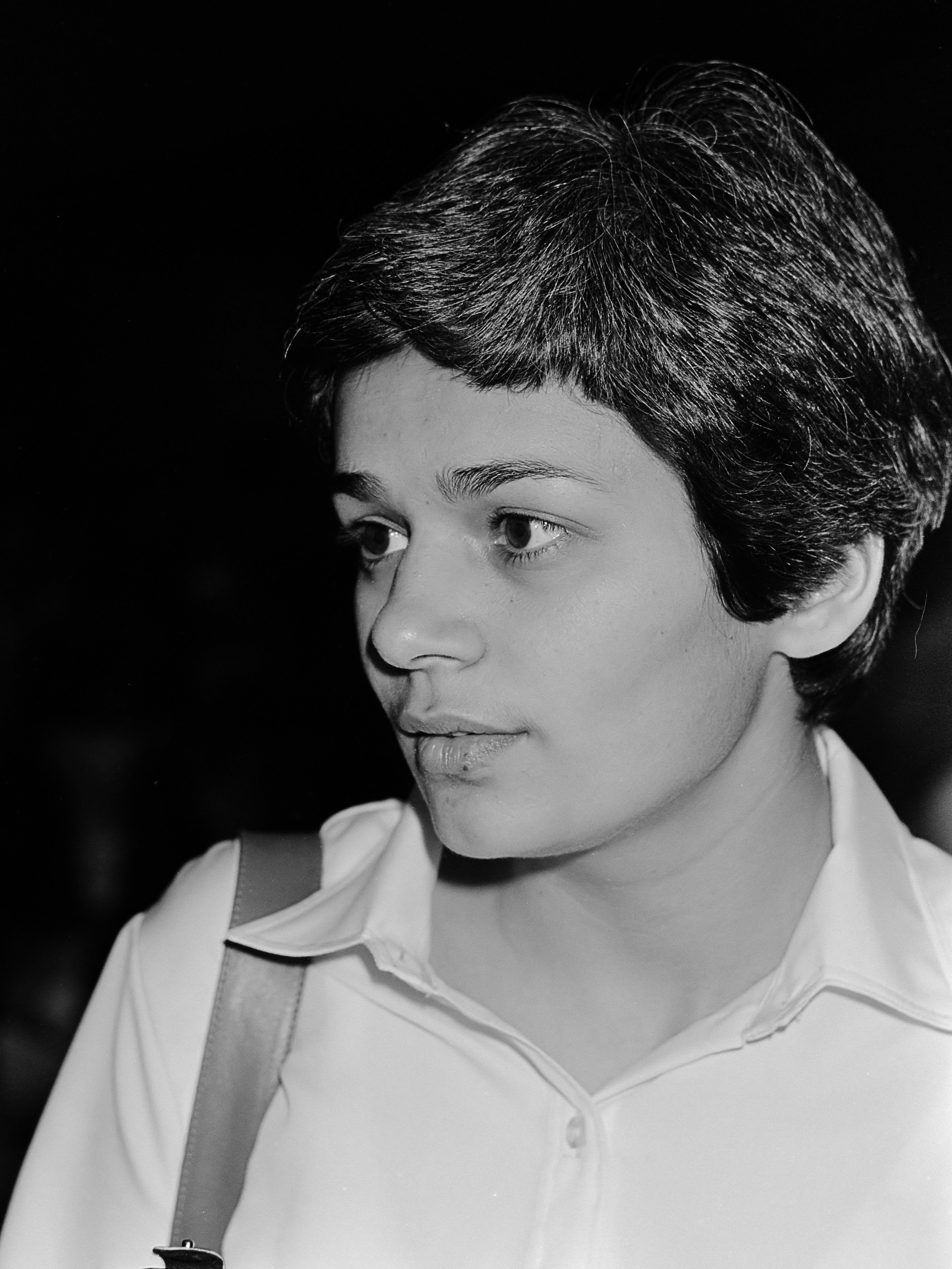
Sharansky's wife Avital at the Sharansky tribunal in Amsterdam, 12 May 1980

As a result of an international campaign led by his wife, Avital Sharansky, Sharansky was released on 11 February 1986 as part of a larger exchange of detainees. He was the first political prisoner released by Mikhail Gorbachev.

Sharansky and three low-level Western spies (Czech citizen Jaroslav Javorský and West German citizens Wolf-Georg Frohn, and Dietrich Nistroy) were exchanged for Czech spies Karl Koecher and Hana Koecher held in the United States, Soviet spy Yevgeni Zemlyakov, Polish spies Marian Zacharski and Jerzy Kaczmarek, and East German spy Detlef Scharfenorth (the latter four held in West Germany). The men were released in two stages, with Sharansky freed first then whisked away, accompanied by the United States Ambassador to West Germany, Richard R. Burt. The exchange took place on the Glienicke Bridge between West Berlin and East Germany, which was used before for this purpose.

== Aftermath ==
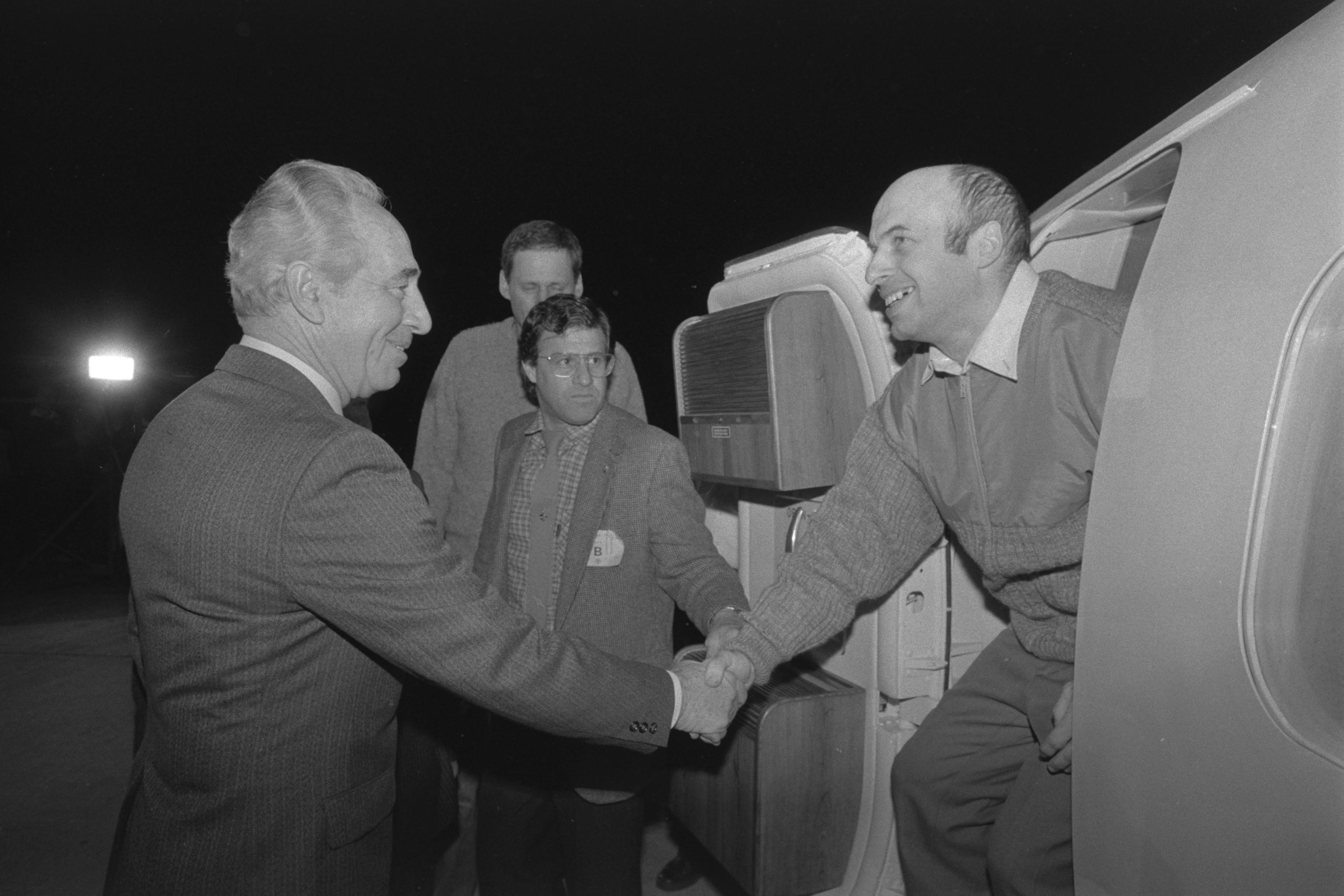
Anatoly Sharansky meeting then-Prime Minister Shimon Peres after his release from the Soviet Union

Sharansky immediately emigrated to Israel, adopting the Hebrew name Natan and eventually simplifying his surname to Sharansky.

Due to his age and poor health, he was exempted from the standard compulsory three years' IDF service, but had to undergo three weeks of military training and do a stint in the Civil Guard.

In 1988, he wrote Fear No Evil, a memoir of his time as a prisoner. He founded the Zionist Forum, an organization of Soviet immigrant Jewish activists dedicated to helping new Israelis and educating the public about integration issues, known in Israel as klita (lit. "absorption"). Sharansky also served as a contributing editor to The Jerusalem Report and as a board member of Peace Watch.

=== Freedom fighter awards ===
- In 1986, the United States Congress granted him the Congressional Gold Medal.
- In 1987, the Hadassah Women's Zionist Organization of America granted Sharansky the Henrietta Szold Award, given by Ruth Popkin.
- In 2006, US President George W. Bush awarded him the Presidential Medal of Freedom.
- On 17 September 2008, the Ronald Reagan Presidential Foundation awarded Sharansky its 2008 Ronald Reagan Freedom Award.

== Israeli political career ==
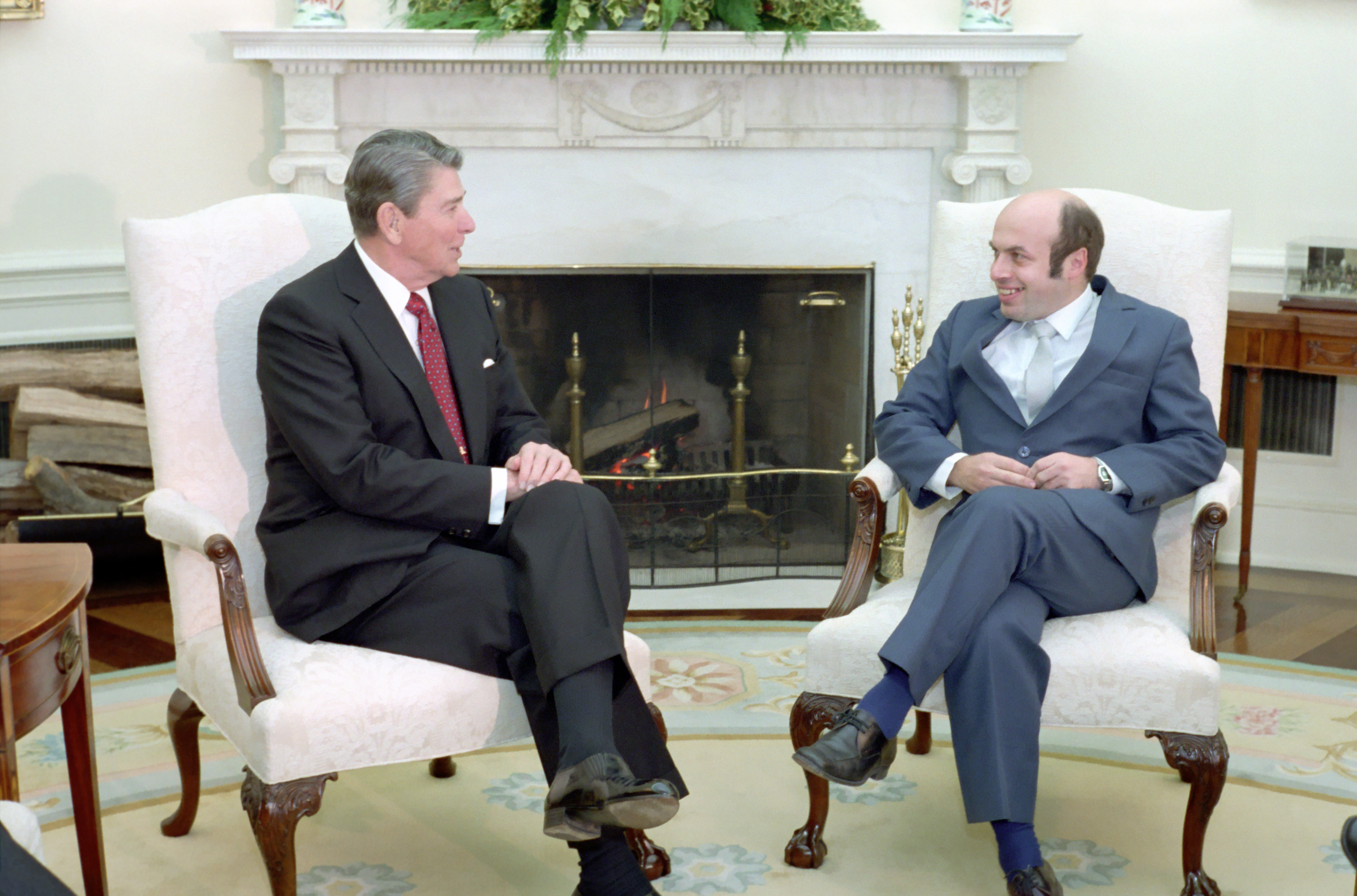
Sharansky and President Ronald Reagan, December 1986

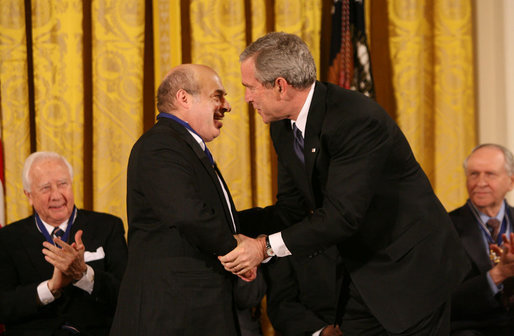
Sharansky is congratulated by President George W. Bush after receiving the Presidential Medal of Freedom, December 2006

In 1995, Sharansky and Yoel Edelstein founded the Yisrael BaAliyah party (a play on words, since "aliya" means both Jewish emigration to Israel and "rise", thus the party name means "(People of) Israel immigrating (to the State of Israel)", as well as "Israel on the rise"), promoting the absorption of the Soviet Jews into Israeli society. The party won seven Knesset seats in 1996. It won 6 seats in the 1999 Israeli legislative election, gaining two ministerial posts, but left the government on 11 July 2000 in response to suggestions that Prime Minister Ehud Barak's negotiations with the Palestinians would result in a division of Jerusalem. After Ariel Sharon won a special election for Prime Minister in 2001, the party joined his new government and was again given two ministerial posts.

In the January 2003 elections, the party was reduced to just two seats. Sharansky resigned from the Knesset and was replaced by Edelstein. However, he remained party chairman and decided to merge it into Likud (which had won the election with 38 seats). The merger went through on 10 March 2003, and Sharansky was appointed Minister of Jerusalem Affairs.

From March 2003 – May 2005, he was Israel's Minister without Portfolio, responsible for Jerusalem's social and Jewish diaspora affairs. Under this position, Sharansky chaired a secret committee that approved the confiscation of East Jerusalem property of West Bank Palestinians. This decision was reversed after an outcry from the Israeli left and the international community.

Previously he served as the Deputy Prime Minister of Israel, Minister of Housing and Construction since March 2001, Interior Minister of Israel (July 1999 – resigned in July 2000), Minister of Industry and Trade (1996–1999).

He resigned from the cabinet in April 2005 to protest plans to withdraw Israeli settlements from the Gaza Strip and northern West Bank.

He was re-elected to the Knesset in March 2006 as a member of the Likud Party. On 20 November 2006, he resigned from the Knesset to head a think tank at the Shalem Center.

=== NGO work and other activities ===
In 2019 Natan Sharansky became the Chairman of the Institute for the study of Global Antisemitism and Policy (ISGAP).

Since 2007, Sharansky has been chairman of the board of Beit Hatefutsot, the Jewish diaspora museum.

In September 2009 Sharansky secured $6 million from the Genesis Philanthropy Group for educational activities in the former Soviet Union.

In June 2009, Sharansky was elected to the chair of the executive of the Jewish Agency for Israel by the Jewish Agency Board of Governors, and was re-elected in 2013. He was replaced on 1 August 2018 by Isaac Herzog.

He is a founding member of One Jerusalem.

Sharanksy is co-founder and chairman of the Genesis Prize Advisory Board.

== Media recognition and awards ==
In 1997, Sharansky was the focus of a 2.5-hour-long episode of Chaim SheKa'ele ("What A Life"), the Israeli version of This Is Your Life. The episode focused mainly on his experiences as a Soviet dissident, and featured many of his family and acquaintances. In 2005, Sharansky participated in They Chose Freedom, a four-part television documentary on the history of the Soviet dissident movement, and in 2008 he was featured in Laura Bialis' documentary Refusenik. In 2014, he took part in Natella Boltyanskaya's documentary Parallels, Events, People. He was number eleven on the list of Time magazine's 100 most influential people of 2005 in the "Scientists and thinkers" category. He won the 2018 Israel Prize for his lifetime achievements and special contributions to the State of Israel in the fields of Immigration and Absorption. He was awarded the 2020 Genesis Prize for his "lifelong struggle for human rights." He donated the $1 million prize money to organizations combating the coronavirus. In 2024, he received the Bonei Zion Prize in the "Special Recognition" category.

== Published works ==
Sharansky is the author of four books. The first is the autobiographical Fear No Evil, which dealt with his trial and imprisonment. The book was awarded the 1989 National Jewish Book Award for Biography.

His second book, The Case for Democracy: The Power of Freedom to Overcome Tyranny and Terror was co-written with Ron Dermer. George W. Bush offered praise for the book:

If you want a glimpse of how I think about foreign policy, read Natan Sharansky's book, The Case for Democracy. ... For government, particularly – for opinion makers, I would put it on your recommended reading list. It's short and it's good. This guy is a heroic figure, as you know. It's a great book.

His third book Defending Identity: Its Indispensable Role in Protecting Democracy, is a defense of the value of national and religious identity in building democracy.

His fourth book Never Alone: Prison, Politics, and My People tells about his political activity and how his personal experience influenced it.

== Political views ==
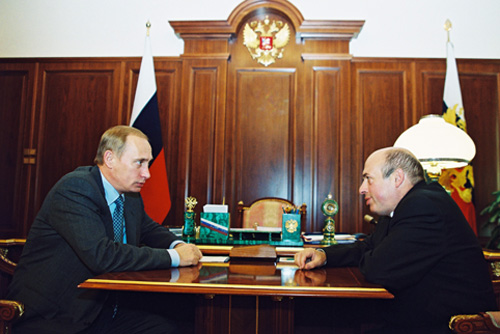
Sharansky and Vladimir Putin in the Kremlin, 19 September 2000

Sharansky has argued that there can never be peace between Israel and the Palestinians until there is "the building of real democratic institutions in the fledgling Palestinian society, no matter how tempting a 'solution' without them may be." In a Haaretz interview, he said:

Jews came here 3,000 years ago and this is the cradle of Jewish civilization. Jews are the only people in history who kept their loyalty to their identity and their land throughout the 2,000 years of exile, and no doubt that they have the right to have their place among nations—not only historically but also geographically. As to the Palestinians, who are the descendants of those Arabs who migrated in the last 200 years, they have the right, if they want, to have their own state ... but not at the expense of the state of Israel.

In the wake of the Arab uprisings of 2011, he told Moment Magazine, "To sign an agreement you must have a partner who is dependent on the well-being of his people, which is what democracy means."

In February 2022, Sharansky called on the Israeli government to take “a clear moral stand” against Russian President Vladimir Putin’s decision to invade Ukraine. He called the Russian invasion of Ukraine the greatest threat to the free world since World War II and said that Israel must stand firmly with the Ukrainian people.

== See also ==
- Dymshits–Kuznetsov hijacking affair
- Town square test
- New antisemitism
- Three Ds of antisemitism

== Bibliography ==
- "Ceasing a life of double thinking". Jewish Quarterly. 33 (3): 15–17. January 1986. doi:10.1080/0449010X.1986.10703688 (inactive 12 July 2025).
- Shcharansky, Anatoly; Bonner, Yelena; Alexeyeva, Ludmilla (26 June 1986). "The tenth year of the Watch". The New York Review of Books. 33 (11).
- "As I see Gorbachev". Commentary. 85 (3): 29–34. 1 March 1988.
- "Life in the 'small zone': Sentenced to a labor camp, a Soviet poet tries to stay internally free". Chicago Tribune. 20 November 1988.
- Shcharansky, Anatoly (Spring 1990). "The legacy of Andrei Sakharov". Journal of Democracy. 1 (2): 35–40. doi:10.1353/jod.1990.0035. S2CID 154840266.
- "Temple mount is more important than peace". Haaretz. 16 October 2003. Archived from the original on 8 January 2016.
- "On hating the Jews. The inextricable link between anti-Semitism and anti-Americanism". The Wall Street Journal. 17 November 2003.
- "3D test of anti-semitism: demonization, double standards, delegitimization". Jewish Political Studies Review (16): 3–4. Fall 2004. Archived from the original on 17 February 2019.
- "Peace will only come after freedom and democracy". Middle East Quarterly. 12 (1): 79–83. Winter 2005.
- Eid, Bassem; Sharansky, Natan (11 February 2008). "Bush's Mideast U-Turn". The Wall Street Journal.
- "The dissident choice". Los Angeles Times. 24 November 2008.
- "How the U.N. perpetuates the 'refugee' problem. Nowhere on earth do terrorists get so much help from the Free World". The Wall Street Journal. 6 January 2009.
- "Students and Housewives vs. Evil Empire. My KGB interrogators scoffed at it, but the movement to free Soviet Jewry helped end the Cold War". The Wall Street Journal. 5 December 2012.
- "Is Rouhani the new Gorbachev? How to test a supposed reformer: stand firm on sanctions, wait for proof". The Wall Street Journal. 17 November 2013.
- "Marshaling the web to fight tyrants. Western leaders often disappoint dissidents, but now regular citizens world-wide can help out". The Wall Street Journal. 16 July 2014.
- Sharansky, Natan; Keyes, David (6 February 2015). "Trust the dissidents, not the diplomats". The Washington Post.
- "Breaking the silence is no human rights organization – and I should know". Haaretz. 31 January 2016.
- Fear No Evil: The Classic Memoir of One Man's Triumph over a Police State, Public Affairs: 1998. ISBN 1-891620-02-9.
- The Case for Democracy: The Power of Freedom to Overcome Tyranny and Terror, Public Affairs: 2004. ISBN 1-58648-261-0.
- Defending Identity: Its Indispensable Role in Protecting Democracy, Public Affairs: 2008. ISBN 1-58648-513-X.
