= Refusenik =

Soviet citizens denied permission to emigrate

January 10, 1973. Soviet Jewish refusenik demonstration in front of the Ministry of Internal Affairs for the right to emigrate to Israel, before being broken up by Soviet authorities.

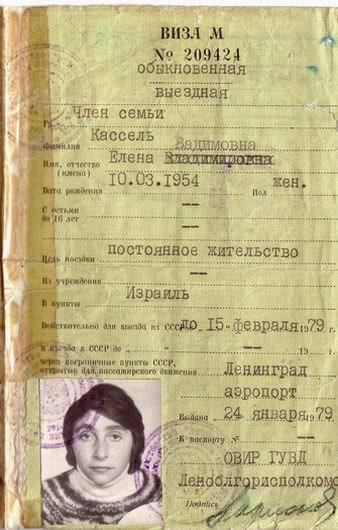
A rare type 2 USSR exit visa. This type of visa was issued to those who received permission to leave the USSR permanently and lost their Soviet citizenship. Many people who wanted to emigrate were unable to receive this kind of exit visa.

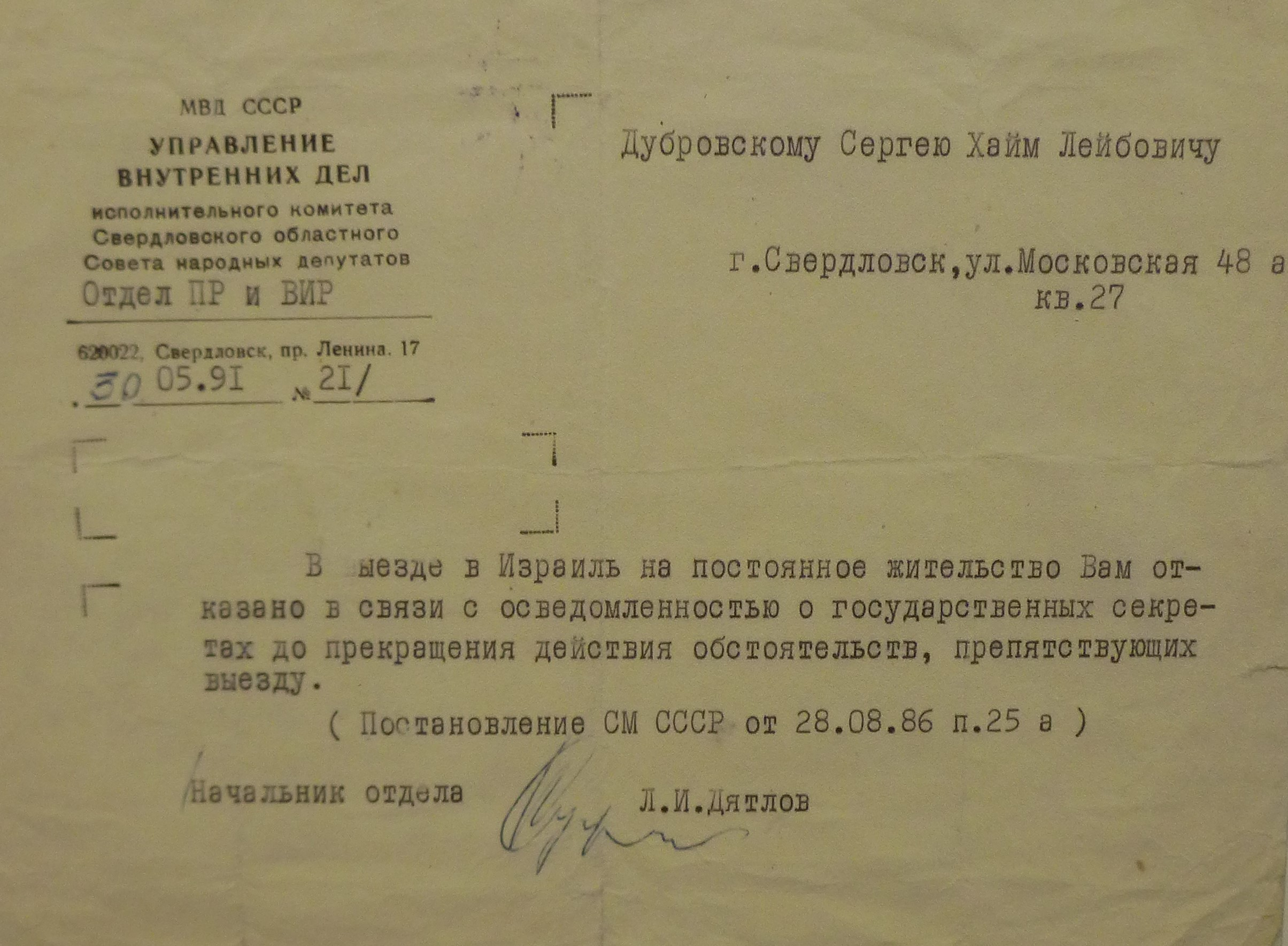
Letter from the MVD to a 76-year-old man from Sverdlovsk refusing him permission to move to Israel due to "knowledge of state secrets", May 1991.

Refusenik (Russian: отказник, romanized: otkaznik, from отказ (otkaz) 'refusal'; alternatively spelled refusnik) was an unofficial term for individuals—typically, but not exclusively, Soviet Jews—who were denied permission to emigrate, primarily to Israel, by the authorities of the Soviet Union and other countries of the Soviet Bloc. The term refusenik is derived from the "refusal" handed down to a prospective emigrant from the Soviet authorities.

Under Joseph Stalin's government, the Soviet Union adopted an isolationist policy that, in part, blocked emigration to non-Communist or non-allied countries for nearly all citizens.

In addition to the Jews, broader categories included:

- Other ethnicities, such as Volga Germans attempting to leave for Germany, Armenians wanting to join their diaspora, and Greeks forcibly removed by Stalin from Crimea and other southern lands to Siberia.
- Members of persecuted religious groups, such as the Ukrainian Greek Catholic Church, Baptists and other Protestant groups, Jehovah's Witnesses, and Russian Mennonites.

A typical basis to deny emigration was the alleged association with Soviet state secrets. Some individuals were labelled as foreign spies or potential seditionists who purportedly wanted to abuse Israeli aliyah and Law of Return (right to return) as a means of escaping punishment for high treason or sedition from abroad.

Applying for an exit visa was a step noted by the KGB, so that future career prospects could be impaired. As a rule, Soviet dissidents and refuseniks were fired from their workplaces and denied employment according to their major specialty. As a result, they had to find a menial job, such as a street sweeper, or face imprisonment on charges of social parasitism.

The ban on Jews emigrating to Israel was lifted in 1971, leading to the 1970s Soviet Union aliyah. The coming to power of Mikhail Gorbachev in the Soviet Union in the mid-1980s, and his policies of glasnost and perestroika, as well as a desire for better relations with the West, allowed most emigrants to emigrate.

== History of the Jewish refuseniks ==
Emigration from the Soviet Union was severely restricted outside of familial or ethnic reunification. Between 1948 and 1982, the only ethnicities that were allowed to emigrate from the Soviet Union were Germans, Armenians and Jews. Not all Jews had their exit visas accepted.

A large number of Soviet Jews applied for exit visas to leave the Soviet Union, especially in the period following the 1967 Six-Day War. While many were allowed to leave, some were refused permission to emigrate by the OVIR (ОВиР, Отдел Виз и Регистрации, Otdel Viz i Registratsii) or Office of Visas and Registration, the MVD (Soviet Ministry of Internal Affairs) department responsible for exit visas. In many instances, the reason given for denial was that these persons had been given access to information vital to Soviet national security and could not now be allowed to leave.

Despite being given special exception for exit visas by the Soviet government, many Jews faced obstacles in their personal and professional lives—including, for instance, unofficial Jewish quotas which limited or prevented their employment. While these restrictions led many Jews to seek emigration, requesting an exit visa was itself seen as a link to Israel. At the same time, strong pressure from the United States caused the Soviet authorities to significantly increase emigration.

In the years 1960 through 1970, only 4,000 people (legally) emigrated from the USSR. In the following decade, the number rose to 250,000, to fall again by 1980. 13,000 exit visas were issued in 1975; 51,300 in 1979; and 9640 in 1980.

=== Hijacking incident ===
In 1970, a group of 16 refuseniks (two of whom were not Jewish), organized by dissident Eduard Kuznetsov (who already served a seven-year term in Soviet prisons), plotted to buy all the seats for the local flight Leningrad-Priozersk, under the guise of a trip to a wedding, on a small 12-seater aircraft Antonov An-2 (colloquially known as кукурузник, kukuruznik), throw out the pilots before takeoff from an intermediate stop, and fly it to Sweden, knowing they faced a huge risk of being captured or shot down. One of the participants, Mark Dymshits, was a former military pilot.

On 15 June 1970, after arriving at Smolnoye (later Rzhevka) Airport near Leningrad, the entire group of the "wedding guests" was arrested by the MVD.

The accused were charged with high treason, punishable by the death sentence under Article 64 of the Penal code of the RSFSR. Dymshits and Kuznetsov were sentenced to capital punishment, but after international protests, it was appealed and replaced with 15 years in prison; Yosef Mendelevitch and Yuri Fedorov: 15 years; Aleksey Murzhenko: 14 years; Sylva Zalmanson (Kuznetsov's wife and the only woman on trial): 10 years; Arie (Leib) Knokh: 13 years; Anatoli Altmann: 12 years; Boris Penson: 10 years; Israel Zalmanson: 8 years; Wolf Zalmanson (brother of Sylva and Israel): 10 years; Mendel Bodnya: 4 years.

=== Crackdown on the refusenik activism and its growth ===
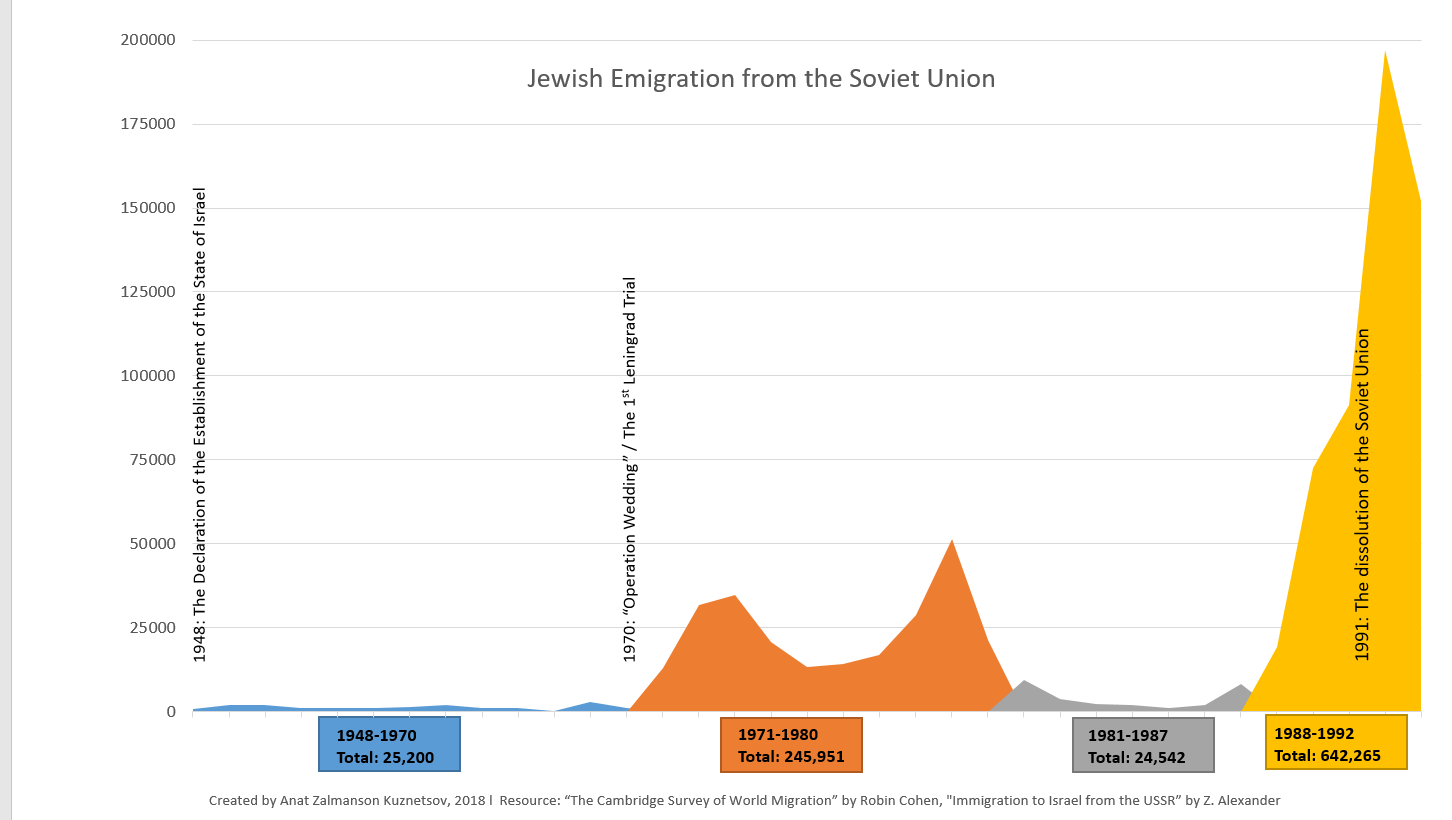
Jewish emigration from USSR, before and after the First Leningrad Trial

The affair was followed by a crackdown on the Jewish and dissident movement throughout the USSR. Activists were arrested, makeshift centers for studying the Hebrew language and Torah were closed, and more trials followed. At the same time, strong international condemnations caused the Soviet authorities to significantly increase the emigration quota. In the years 1960 through 1970, only about 3,000 Soviet Jews had (legally) emigrated from the USSR; after the trial, in the period from 1971 to 1980 347,100 people received a visa to leave the USSR, 245,951 of them were Jews.

A leading proponent and spokesman for the refusenik rights during the mid-1970s was Natan Sharansky. Sharansky's involvement with the Moscow Helsinki Group helped to establish the struggle for emigration rights within the greater context of the human rights movement in the USSR. His arrest on charges of espionage and treason and subsequent trial contributed to international support for the refusenik cause.

=== International pressure ===
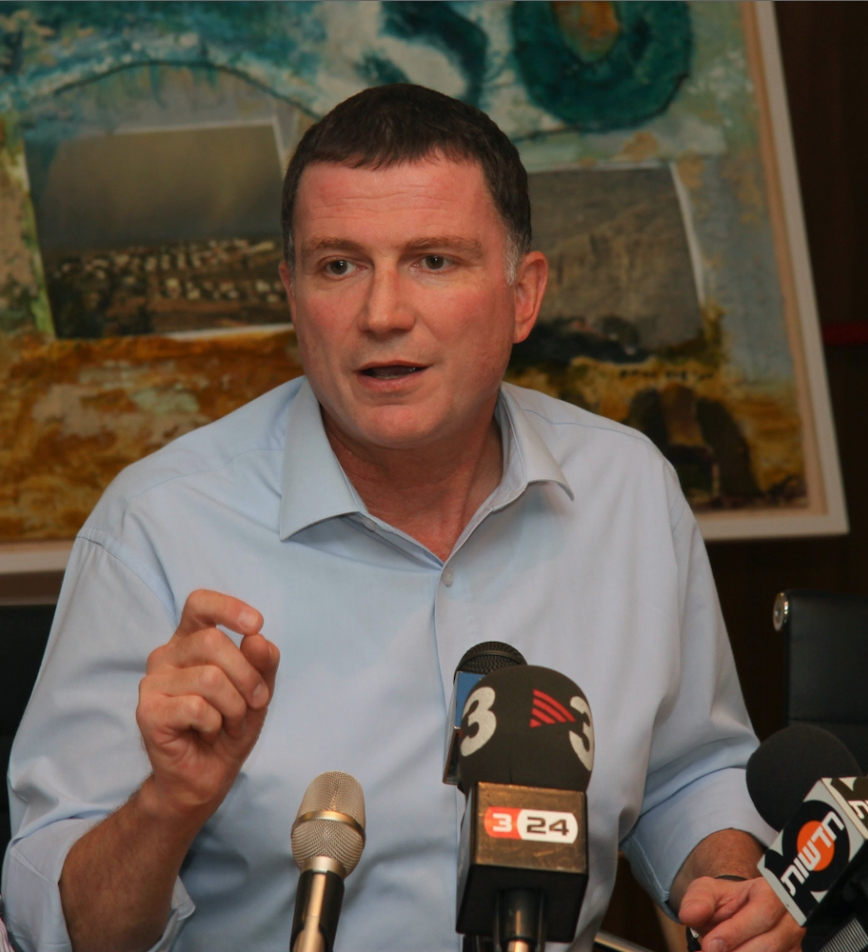
Yuli Edelstein, one of the Soviet Union's most prominent refuseniks, who served as Speaker of the Knesset (Israel's parliament) from 2013 to 2020

On 18 October 1976, 13 Jewish refuseniks came to the Presidium of the Supreme Soviet to petition for explanations of denials of their right to emigrate from the USSR, as affirmed under the Helsinki Final Act. Failing to receive any answer, they assembled in the reception room of the Presidium on the following day. After a few hours of waiting, they were seized by the police, taken outside of the city limits and beaten. Two of them were kept in police custody.

In the next week, following an unsuccessful meeting between the activists' leaders and the Soviet Minister of Internal Affairs, General Nikolay Shchelokov, these abuses of law inspired several demonstrations in the Soviet capital. On Monday, 25 October 1976, 22 activists, including Mark Azbel, Felix Kandel, Alexander Lerner, Ida Nudel, Anatoly Shcharansky, Vladimir Slepak, and Michael Zeleny, were arrested in Moscow on their way to the next demonstration. They were convicted of hooliganism and incarcerated in the detention center Beryozka and other penitentiaries in and around Moscow. An unrelated party, artist Victor Motko, arrested in Dzerzhinsky Square, was detained along with the protesters in recognition of his prior attempts to emigrate from the USSR. These events were covered by several British and American journalists including David K. Shipler, Craig R. Whitney, and Christopher S. Wren. The October demonstrations and arrests coincided with the end of the 1976 United States presidential election. On October 25, U.S. presidential candidate Jimmy Carter expressed his support of the protesters in a telegram sent to Scharansky, and urged the Soviet authorities to release them. (See Léopold Unger, Christian Jelen, Le grand retour, A. Michel 1977; Феликс Кандель, Зона отдыха, или Пятнадцать суток на размышление, Типография Ольшанский Лтд, Иерусалим, 1979; Феликс Кандель, Врата исхода нашего: Девять страниц истории, Effect Publications, Tel-Aviv, 1980.) On 9 November 1976, a week after Carter won the presidential election, the Soviet authorities released all but two of the previously arrested protesters. Several more were subsequently rearrested and incarcerated or exiled to Siberia.

On 1 June 1978, refuseniks Vladimir and Maria Slepak stood on the eighth story balcony of their apartment building. By then they had been denied permission to emigrate for over 8 years. Vladimir displayed a banner that read "Let us go to our son in Israel". His wife Maria held a banner that read "Visa for my son". Fellow refusenik and Helsinki activist Ida Nudel held a similar display on the balcony of her own apartment. They were all arrested and charged with malicious hooliganism in violation of Article 206.2 of the Penal Code of the Soviet Union. The Moscow Helsinki Group protested their arrests in circulars dated 5 and 15 June of that year. Vladimir Slepak and Ida Nudel were convicted of all charges. They served 5 and 4 years in Siberian exile.

Various Western activist organizations constituted the Soviet Jewry Movement. Human rights organizations included the Cleveland Council on Soviet Anti-Semitism (1963), Student Struggle for Soviet Jewry (1964), Bay Area Council for Soviet Jews (1967), the Union of Councils for Soviet Jews (1970), and the National Coalition Supporting Soviet Jewry (1971).

Another major source of pressure in favor of the rights of refuseniks was the Jackson–Vanik amendment to the 1974 Trade Act. Jackson–Vanik affected U.S. trade relations with countries with non-market economies (originally, countries of the Communist Bloc) that restricted freedom of emigration and other human rights. As such, it was applied to the USSR. According to Mark E. Talisman, those who benefited included Jewish refuseniks from the Soviet Union, as well as Hungarians, Romanians, and other citizens that sought to emigrate from their nations.

== Refusenik as a word ==
Although 'refusenik' originally had a precise meaning – those denied exit from the Soviet Union – its meaning has sometimes diverged away from this sense. It began to be used to mean "outsider" for groups other than Russian Jews and later to mean "those who refuse" rather than its original sense of "those who are refused". Over time, "refusenik" has entered colloquial English for a person who refuses to do something, especially by way of protest.

In 1992, Mikhail Gorbachev referred to himself as the first political "refusenik of Russia", after buildings of the Gorbachev Foundation were taken by the Russian government and the country's high court asked the government to prevent Gorbachev leaving the country.

It is occasionally used in the UK to mean "ones who refuse to comply", and in the U.S., with many people who use it being unaware of the word's origins. However, the original meaning is preserved and used in parallel, particularly in Israeli and Jewish articles about the historical events from which it emerged.

Israeli citizens who refuse to serve in the Israel Defense Forces, called sarvanim or mishtamtim in Hebrew, have been referred to disparagingly as refuseniks in English for their "refusal to serve".

== Documentary films ==
- In 2008 filmmaker Laura Bialis released a documentary film, Refusenik, chronicling the human rights struggle of the Soviet refuseniks.
- Operation Wedding: a 2016 documentary film by filmmaker Anat Zalmanson-Kuznetsov, about her parents story Sylva Zalmanson and Eduard Kuznetsov, leading characters in the Dymshits–Kuznetsov hijacking affair—a daring escape attempt from the USSR in 1970 that kickstarted the Soviet Jewry movement.

== See also ==
- Ausreiseantrag
- Aliyah
- Balseros, Cuban citizens who are not legally allowed to migrate and who cross to Florida in improvised boats
- Eastern Bloc emigration and defection
- Herman Branover
- Iosif Begun
- Jackson–Vanik amendment
- Lishkat Hakesher
- Migration diplomacy
- Movement to Free Soviet Jewry
- Pidyon shvuyim
- Prisoner of Zion
