= Oleksii Murzhenko =

Ukrainian Soviet dissident and human rights activist (1942–1999)

- Олексій Мурженко
- Born: 23 November 1942; Lozova, German-occupied Ukraine
- Died: 31 December 1999 (aged 57); New York, New York, United States
- Burial place: Bound Brook, New Jersey
- Education: Moscow Finance Institute (expelled)
- Status: Released 1987
- Criminal charges: Anti-Soviet agitation (1962); Treason, theft of state property, anti-Soviet agitation (1970); Violation of administrative supervision (1985)
- Penalty: 6 years' imprisonment (1962); 14 years' imprisonment (1970); 2 years' imprisonment (1985)

Oleksii Hryhorovych Murzhenko (Note: Also translated from Russian as Alexei Grigoryevich Murzhenko (Russian: Алексей Григорьевич Мурженко).) (Ukrainian: Олексій Григорович Мурженко; 23 November 1942 – 31 December 1999) was a Ukrainian Soviet dissident and human rights activist. He spent a total of 22 years imprisoned in the Soviet Union on various political charges, including for founding a neo-Marxist underground group and as a result of his involvement in the 1970 Dymshits–Kuznetsov hijacking affair. Following his release in 1987, he immigrated to the United States, where he continued to advocate for human rights in Ukraine until his 1999 death from stomach cancer.

== Early life and first arrest ==
Oleksii Hryhorovych Murzhenko was born on 23 November 1942 in the city of Lozova in eastern Ukraine, in what was then the Soviet Union. After studying at Kyiv Suvorov Military School Murzhenko became a student at the Moscow Finance Institute. While in Moscow, he founded a neo-Marxist group of students known as the Union of Liberty and Reason. Murzhenko's co-founder as leader of the group was Yuriy Fyodorov, a Ukrainian and Russian Marxist who he would continue to collaborate with on dissident activities. The Union for Liberty and Reason primarily distributed leaflets to universities, libraries, and other such institutions throughout Moscow condemning the Soviet government.

Murzhenko was arrested on 3 March 1962 and charged with anti-Soviet agitation for establishing the Union of Liberty and Reason. On 20 June of the same year, he was found guilty and sentenced to six years of imprisonment at a camp in the Mordovian Autonomous Soviet Socialist Republic, as well as at Vladimir Central Prison. He was released on 2 March 1968, and returned to Lozova.

== Dymshits–Kuznetsov hijacking and second arrest ==
In 1970, Murzhenko (along with Fyodorov) agreed to assist a group of refuseniks in hijacking a plane to flee the Soviet Union. Unlike the eight refuseniks, who sought to escape to Israel, Murzhenko and Fyodorov wished to travel to Sweden. Following the group's arrest, Murzhenko was charged with treason, theft of state property, anti-Soviet agitation and preparation of a crime. Murzhenko pled guilty to some of the charges, claiming that he was not anti-Soviet and that his life had been ruined by his previous conviction. He argued that he had been motivated by a poor family life to join the hijacking.

Murzhenko was found guilty on all counts by a Leningrad court and sentenced to fourteen years of imprisonment as a "particularly dangerous recidivist". He spent his tenure at Perm-35 and Perm-36, two forced labour camps in Perm Oblast. During his imprisonment, Murzhenko repeatedly joined prisoners' appeals to Soviet authorities asking for the government to respect their human rights. As a result, he was placed in solitary confinement. Along with fellow hijacker Eduard Kuznetsov and Danylo Shumuk Murzhenko was engaged in a public spat with Ukrainian dissidents Valentyn Moroz, Sviatoslav Karavanskyi and Ivan Gel over whether to focus on active resistance against the Soviet government or self-preservation. The conflict, which was encouraged by the KGB, was ultimately mediated by dissident leader Viacheslav Chornovil. Murzhenko was recognised by international human rights non-governmental organisation Amnesty International as a prisoner of conscience by June 1979.

Murzhenko was not released as part of a June 1979 prisoner swap between the Soviet Union and United States, and remained imprisoned until June 1984, after most of the other participants in the hijacking had already been released. His continued imprisonment, along with that of Fyodorov, was condemned by Soviet dissident leader Andrei Sakharov, as well as United States congressman Raymond J. McGrath, who both called for his release.

== Third arrest and emigration ==
Following his release, Murzhenko lived in Kyiv under a police guard. This would prove to be short-lived, however, as on 4 June 1985 he was again arrested and charged with violating his administrative supervision. He was sentenced to two years' imprisonment and interned at MKh-324/58 in Iziaslav, Ukraine.

Upon his release in 1987, Murzhenko emigrated to Israel, and then to New York City in the United States in 1989. At 47 and having spent 22 years imprisoned, he was unable to find work and lived off of unemployment benefits. During this time, he occasionally was a writer for Ukrainian diaspora periodicals and a presenter for Radio Liberty.

Murzhenko died on 31 December 1999 from stomach cancer. He was buried in Bound Brook, New Jersey.
