= David Altshuler =

David Altshuler may refer to:

- David Altshuler (physician) (born 1964), American clinical endocrinologist and human geneticist
- David Altshuler (curator), American scholar and museum director
