= Anna Cohn =

American museum director and Judaic scholar (1950–2019)

Anna R. Cohn
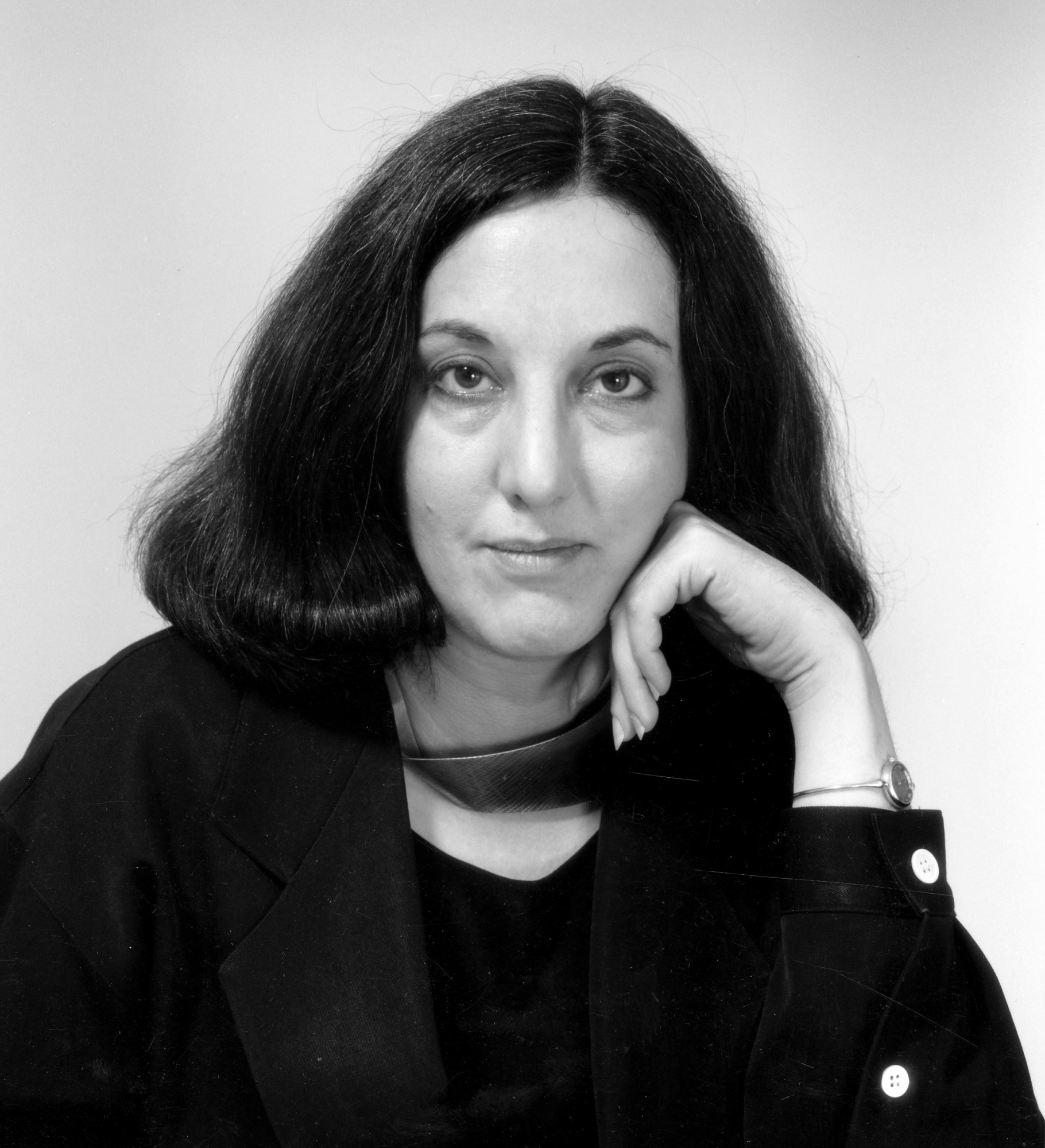
- Cohn in 1988
- Born: 20 September 1950; Minneapolis, Minnesota, US
- Died: 24 March 2019 (aged 68); Minneapolis, Minnesota
- Education: Williams College
- Occupations: Museum director, curator, Judaic scholar
- Organization: Smithsonian Institution Traveling Exhibition Service (SITES)

Anna Rebecca Cohn (20 September 1950 – 24 March 2019) was an American museum director and Judaic scholar. Her four-decade career began in the curation of Judaica and centered on the Smithsonian Institution Traveling Exhibition Service (SITES), where she served as a director.

== Early life and education ==
Cohn was born in Minneapolis, Minnesota, in 1950, and spent part of her childhood in Israel and the Netherlands. She studied in Israel for a semester of high school on the Eisendrath International Exchange (EIE) program, followed by her junior year of college (1970–71) at the Hebrew University of Jerusalem. Cohn returned to the United States and continued her undergraduate studies at the University of Minnesota in history and Judaic studies. She then studied art history at Williams College, Massachusetts.

== Career ==
Cohn quickly rose to become a director at the B'nai B'rith Museum and the Jewish Museum in Washington, D.C., at the time, one of the world's largest museums of Judaica.

In 1982, Mark E. Talisman of Project Judaica recruited Cohn to join the curatorial team preparing The Precious Legacy. Cohn travelled to the State Jewish Museum in Prague, Czechoslovakia, and helped select items for loan to the Smithsonian Institution for the travelling exhibition. Cohn was chosen as the international tour's project director, and was involved in every aspect of the undertaking. During the same period, Cohn was director of planning for the future US Holocaust Memorial Museum, which she believed "should strive for authenticity". She resigned from the position in January 1985, citing working problems with the oversight council. A turnover of development personnel followed as the council sought a new direction for the museum and its exhibitions.

Cohn returned to the Smithsonian Institution Traveling Exhibition Service (SITES), becoming a program director. Among her projects were the exhibits Crossroads of Continents: Cultures of Siberia and Alaska, September 11: Bearing Witness to History, and 381 Days: The Montgomery Bus Boycott Story. In a 2000 New York Times interview, Cohn discussed bringing travelling exhibits of all kinds to Middle America, where art appreciation had grown, but towns couldn't support permanent museums, which had led her to develop the Museum on Main Street initiative.

== Later life and death ==
Cohn retired in 2014, citing health reasons. She returned to Minneapolis, where she died in 2019.
