= Gennadi Kryuchkov =

Gennadi Konstantinovich Kryuchkov (Russian: Геннадий Константинович Крючков, 20 October 1926, Stalingrad, Soviet Union - 15 July 2007, Tula, Russia) was a Russian leader of the Baptist church in the Soviet Union. He was pursued by the KGB for over 25 years, and was described in his obituary in The Independent as "one of the most extraordinary of the Soviet Union's religious leaders in the post-Stalin era".

Kryuchkov was born in the then newly renamed Stalingrad (previously Tsaritsyn, now Volgograd). His parents became Baptists shortly before his birth, and he was raised in that denomination. In 1931, his father was sent to a labour camp for five years as a result of his faith, and was banned from living in Moscow after he was released.

Kryuchkov was conscripted into the Red Army in 1943. He remained a soldier until 1951, when he rejoined his family in Uzlovaya, near Tula, where his father was a coal miner. He became an electrician. He married Lydia Domozhirova in 1951, and they were both baptised as Baptists later that year at an unregistered church. The official All-Union Council of Evangelical Christians-Baptists considered sending him for training outside the Soviet Union, but he refused to cooperate with the Soviet authorities. He was ordained as a Baptist pastor in 1960, but was quickly in trouble when in 1961 he joined a call to resist new and more restrictive regulations imposed on the church.

He became chairman of the predecessor of the Council of Churches of Evangelical Christians-Baptists in 1962, after its leader Pastor Alexei Prokofiev was imprisoned. He worked with its general secretary Georgi Vins. He and Vins had met Anastas Mikoyan at the Supreme Soviet of the Soviet Union in Moscow in 1961, in an attempt to encourage reform. The Council of Churches was formally set up as an underground body in 1965.

After a mass prayer meeting outside the building of the Communist Party Central Committee in Moscow on 16 May 1966, Kryuchkov and Vins were arrested. After months of interrogation, they were convicted after a show trial in November 1966, and they were imprisoned in a special regime camp for three years. They were released in 1969, and went into hiding the following year, sheltered by their supporters. Despite being illegal and persecuted, the Council maintained a network of prayer houses, pastors and printing presses producing Bibles and Christian literature across the Soviet Union. Vins was recaptured in March 1974, and deported from the Soviet Union in 1979. Kryuchkov continued to preach and lead the Council until his death. He also wrote for the journal Herald of Truth.

Kryuchkov was hunted by the police and the KGB until 1990, with wanted posters displayed in public places. Although he saw little of his wife and family, who were subject to constant surveillance, he and his wife had nine children together.

After 19 years in hiding, he reappeared in public at the Council's annual congress at Rostov-on-Don in July 1989, in the wake of Mikhail Gorbachev's glasnost and perestroika reforms. After speaking, he quickly made his escape before the waiting KGB could arrest him.

His wife died before him in 2007. He died in Tula on 15 July 2007.
