= The Precious Legacy =

1980 travelling exhibition of Czech Jewish art

The Precious Legacy: Judaic Treasures from the Czechoslovak State Collections
- Status: Discontinued
- Genre: Exhibition
- Begins: October 7, 1980
- Ends: 1999
- Locations: The Whitworth (Manchester); National Museum of Natural History (Washington, D.C.); Bass Museum (Miami Beach); Jewish Museum (New York City); San Diego Museum of Art; Detroit Institute of Arts; Wadsworth Atheneum (Hartford); Royal Ontario Museum (Toronto); Glenbow Museum (Calgary); Montreal Museum of Fine Arts; Israel Museum (Jerusalem); Waldemarsudde (Stockholm); Auckland War Memorial Museum; Powerhouse Museum (Sydney); Immigration Museum (Melbourne)
- Country: United Kingdom, United States, Canada, Israel, Sweden, New Zealand, Australia
- Attendance: 550,000 (U.S. tour)
- Organiser: C. R. Dodwell (Whitworth Art Gallery); Mark E. Talisman (Project Judaica); Anna Cohn (Smithsonian project director); David Altshuler (Smithsonian curator)

The Precious Legacy: Judaic Treasures from the Czechoslovak State Collections was one of the names for a travelling exhibition of Czech Jewish art and ritual objects that opened at The Whitworth in Manchester, in 1980. It subsequently toured the United States and Canada from 1983 to 1986. In 1990, part of the show was brought to Israel for a joint exhibition with the permanent collection of the Israel Museum. The travelling exhibition was relaunched in 1998 for a two-year tour of Sweden, New Zealand, and Australia.

The objects, dating from the early 17th to mid-20th centuries, included silverwork, pottery, textiles, paintings, drawings, and ritual and household items. The exhibition was noted for being a mixture of fine art, folk art, and anthropological study; for the irony by which fascists and communists had preserved the merits of the culture; and for showing a continuity of culture across multiple social upheavals.

It was the first major exhibition of Judaica to be displayed in North America or Australia, with items rarely shown outside of synagogues. The international exhibit also served as a vehicle for publicizing the existence and history of the Jewish Museum in Prague. During its U.S. tour, the exhibit drew more than 550,000 visitors, with a record-breaking attendance of over 110,000 in its seven-week run at the Smithsonian's National Museum of Natural History.

== History of the collection ==
The exhibit had its origins in the Jewish Museum established in 1906 in Prague, one of the oldest continuous Jewish communities in Europe. The museum was founded by historian Salomon Hugo Lieben to preserve items from demolished synagogues. He collected 1,000 ceremonial and folk art objects and 1,500 rare books. In 1912, the community provided a building that had belonged to a burial society, and in 1926 the museum received a larger building for the growing collection. The success prompted other Jewish communities to start their own museums, and by 1940 the collection included about 2,500 objects.

In 1942, the Nazi regime took over the museum and wrote a new charter, renaming the collection the Central Jewish Museum and designating it as a repository for confiscated Jewish property. The Nazis prioritised the museums' functions as the collection and storage of "numerous, hitherto scattered Jewish possessions of both historical and artistic value, on the territory of the entire Protectorate". The owners of these artifacts were deported to extermination camps. From the personal possessions confiscated, precious metals were initially melted down and manuscripts burned, but the sheer volume of material overwhelmed the mechanisms of destruction; such material was then transported to Prague where the museum's Jewish curators were forced to catalogue thousands of items received each day. Reinhard Heydrich, the Nazi official in charge of the Protectorate of Bohemia and Moravia (with its capital at Prague), sought to preserve and exhibit the material as decadent, barbaric, and depraved, to advance the theory that the Jews were an inferior race which had to be exterminated. The Nazi purpose in collecting and preserving so many Jewish artifacts was to demonstrate the greatness of Nazi prowess in annihilating large Jewish communities. It was the Nazis' intention to incorporate these and other items into a "Museum to an Extinct Race".

The museum's Jewish curators were set to work cataloguing between 140,000 and 150,000 artifacts, ranging from wedding portraits and infant cradles to Torah scrolls and hand-embroidered synagogue fabrics. The materials had been seized by the fascist regime from the 77,297 Moravian and Bohemian Jews who had been sent to death camps—in the words of art critic Jo Ann Lewis, "a donor list without precedent in the history of mankind". Between 1942 and 1945, the incoming flow of artifacts filled the museum's premises as well as those of eight other buildings and more than 50 warehouses. The Jewish curators, only one of whom survived the war, believed that preservation would "become the mute but compelling testimony of a prosecuted people". According to historian David Altshuler, they quietly rebelled with Hebrew text describing the true use of items. The Central Jewish Museum's only exhibition was a private showing arranged for the Schutzstaffel (SS).

The last items received by the museum came from Theresienstadt Ghetto (Czech: Terezín) which was liberated by the Soviet Union on May 8, 1945. This included the clothing and secret possessions of the camp's residents. At its peak, the collection held about one million pieces; about 150,000 remained after post-war dispersal. In particular, between 1945 and 1950, several thousand prayer books and other ritual objects were distributed to the estimated 50 Jewish communities and minyanim (prayer quorums) that had been re-established in Bohemia, Moravia, and Slovakia. However, as many of these congregations disbanded, some of the artifacts were returned to the museum's coffers.

In 1949, the Prague Jewish Community Council of the remnant Jewish community in the Czech lands ceded control of the museum to the Communist regime. On April 4, 1950, it was renamed the State Jewish Museum, a cultural institution spread over six synagogues, a ceremonial hall and a cemetery, established as "a memorial, an historic preservation agency and research institute". The Communists suppressed Judaism, forbade contact with foreign researchers, and the only exhibitions allowed were of children's drawings from Terezín. Following the Soviet invasion of 1968, few new exhibitions were held. Although the museum was Czechoslovakia's largest tourist attraction, annually drawing 700,000 visitors, the Judaica collection was known only to scholars in the field.

Following the 1989 Velvet Revolution, control of the museum and its collection was returned to the Jewish community.

== Exhibit history ==
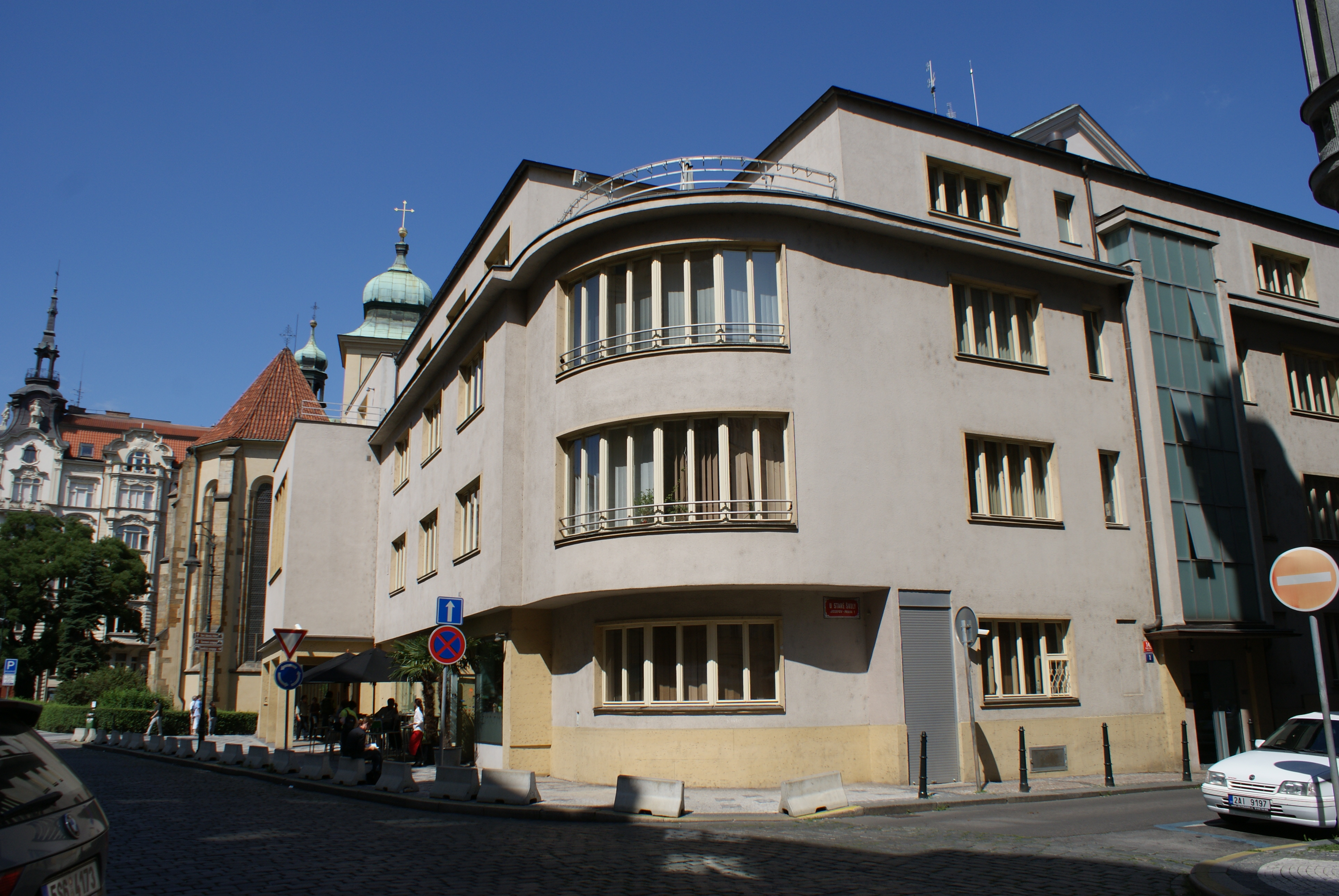
Jewish Museum in Prague

The idea for the exhibit was born in 1968 when U.S. Congressman Charles Vanik, a descendant of Czech Catholic immigrants, and his Jewish aide Mark E. Talisman visited Prague on a mission of East–West understanding during the Cold War. In that era, only a small selection of the museum's collection was on display, but the two Americans were shown some of the items the museum had in its storage rooms. According to Talisman, "The collection was over a thousand times larger than anyone had known". What moved Talisman most was that "the whole horror of the Holocaust was brought to life again when I realized that each (carefully labeled and recorded) artifact was attached to a person". Talisman worked for the next 15 years to arrange for the loan of a traveling exhibition.

Other Western countries and museums also sought an exhibition of the collection. The first to obtain a loan from the State Jewish Museum was the Whitworth Art Gallery at the University of Manchester, England, in 1980. Whitworth director Charles Reginald Dodwell had spent eight years to negotiate an exchange of exhibitions, and considered it his career highlight. The Whitworth provided a loan from its permanent collection of Pre-Raphaelites and related artists, which was exhibited in Bratislava (now capital of Slovakia) and Prague some months prior to the loan from Prague's Judaica collection. It was the first show of the collection in the West, and the first time many of the objects were publicly shown outside of Czechoslovakia.

In the meantime, Talisman had become chairman of Project Judaica and obtained government, corporate and Jewish agency support for a U.S. tour. Among the obstacles was that in 1945 the Allies had taken Czech gold bullion, storing it in Fort Knox and promising to return it when the Czech government settled wartime claims. Once that issue was settled in 1982, arrangements for the exhibition rapidly moved forward. Talisman recruited art historian Anna Cohn from the National Jewish Museum (B'nai B'rith Klutznick) in 1982; she joined the Smithsonian curatorial team and became the project director for the North American tour. Altshuler, a professor of Judaic studies, also joined the curatorial team.

109 individuals and organizations donated a total of $1 million to bring the exhibit to the United States; the major gift was from Philip Morris, Inc., the exhibition's national corporate sponsor. The U.S. tour was funded with a large gift from Philip Morris USA.

=== Canadian extension ===
Duncan Ferguson Cameron, director of the Glenbow Museum in Calgary, Alberta, was profoundly moved when he saw The Precious Legacy at its opening at the Smithsonian's National Museum of Natural History on November 9, 1983. "I came away moved by the determination to celebrate so evident in the show." Feeling that it met "all the criteria of a worthwhile exhibition", he initiated the idea for a Canadian tour, and in summer 1984 was named the official negotiator on behalf of the National Museums of Canada. An agreement was signed on July 23, 1985, for the exhibition to be shown at Toronto's Royal Ontario Museum, the Glenbow Museum, and the Montreal Museum of Fine Arts. The Smithsonian agreed to consult for the Canadian tour and allow use of the exhibit catalogue while Canada would pay for the exhibit's return to Prague. The cost of the Canadian tour was estimated at CA$1.9 million, with one-quarter paid by the federal government, one-quarter by the three provincial governments, and one-sixth each by the three museums. Several other countries had attempted to secure a tour of the exhibit but failed.

== Description ==
Three hundred and fifty objects from the State Jewish Museum of Prague collection were included in the exhibit. The artifacts were displayed alongside photo-murals of Nazi storage rooms crammed with violins, books, pianos, household furnishings, and other items confiscated from their doomed owners. The exhibit was divided into five themed sections, each separated by an arched stone gateway, simulating the streets of the old Jewish Quarter of Prague.

Most of the artifacts were 18th and 19th century, the oldest object being a 1601 parochet (Ark curtain). Together with sterling silver Torah pointers were simple pointers in wood, and ritual pitchers of painted pottery. Display cases in the exhibit showcased silver and gold ritual objects—many, like a Torah crown, styled in emulation of the Imperial Crown of Austria, reflecting the cultural integration of the Jewish community in central Europe. The artifacts represented all aspects of the Jewish year, including Passover Seder plates, matzo rollers, Hanukkah menorahs and dreidels, Havdalah candles, and items used in Jewish wedding and burial ceremonies. Household items such as tablecloths and coffee grinders were also included. According to one of the curators, "The Nazis took spoons and dishes and furniture, and they did it with the same kind of pathological efficiency with which they did everything".

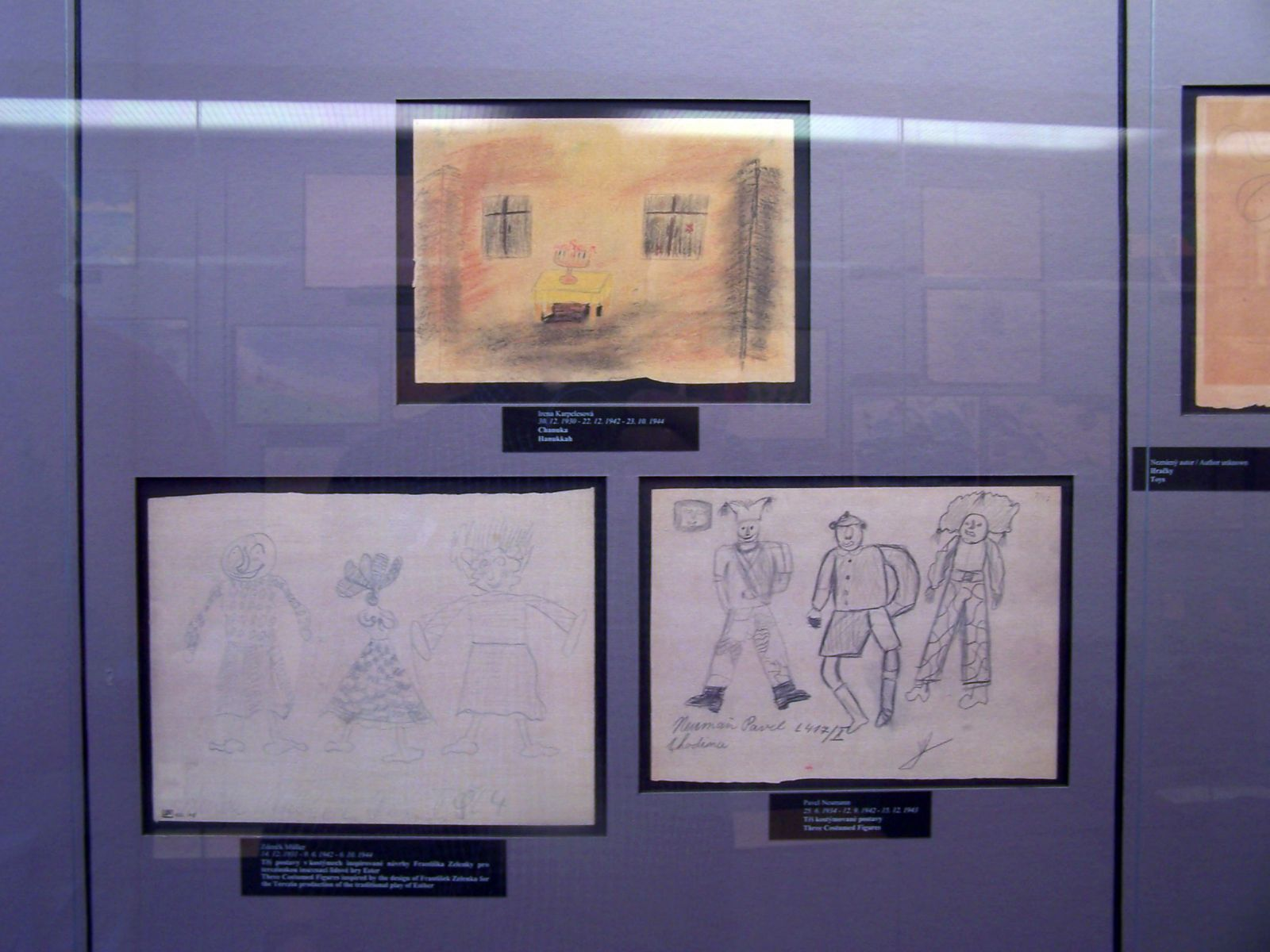
Children's drawings from the Theresienstadt Ghetto on display at the Jewish Museum of Prague

"Dozens" of historical oil portraits of men, women, and children were also featured. A series of portraits depicts death and mourning rituals in Judaism, including the burial society gathering to recite prayers by the deathbed, washing the body, sewing the shroud, placing the body in the earth, and engaging in the traditional week of mourning. One section of the exhibition was devoted to the Jewish deportees to the Theresienstadt Ghetto. Collections from this period include children's artwork, such as a sketch of the interior of the barracks by a nine-year-old inmate.

It was the first major exhibit of Judaica to be displayed in North American museums. Altshuler stated that this was rooted in theology, specifically the Second Commandment's directive against making graven images and whether items of communion could leave the synagogue. For similar reasons there is little pure art, aside from a few portraits, with most of the objects being functional items made for a specific purpose. The objects have a familiarity in the universal experiences of birth, work, family life, and death.

Salem Alaton, writing for The Globe and Mail, described it as a collection of beautiful functional items with a relationship to a living culture, with mixed opinions on whether the show was fine art, folk art, or an anthropological display. He noted the "richness and humanity" of the culture, and its "almost incomprehensible endurance" in a study of how they lived, rather than how they died.

Nancy Baele of The Ottawa Citizen wrote that the objects give a sense of stability and continuity, despite the many upheavals in the community's thousand-year history. She felt that the final exhibition area, "The Legacy of Tragedy and Transcendence" which addresses the Holocaust, showed a sense of unprecedented horror. However, she felt that the religious items and children's drawings secretly made at Thereseindstadt to be the most moving, testifying to a continuity of culture under unimaginable circumstances.

== Exhibition sites and attendance ==
=== United Kingdom ===
The exhibition opened as Jewish Art Treasures from Prague at the Whitworth Art Gallery, University of Manchester, in Manchester, England, and was shown from October 7 to December 16, 1980. It was the first show of Prague's Judaica collection in the West, and included 300 objects. While the Jewish Museum of Prague retained a collection of 1,564 Torah scrolls, none of them were sent to this exhibition. Attendance of the exhibit was 38,000.

=== United States ===
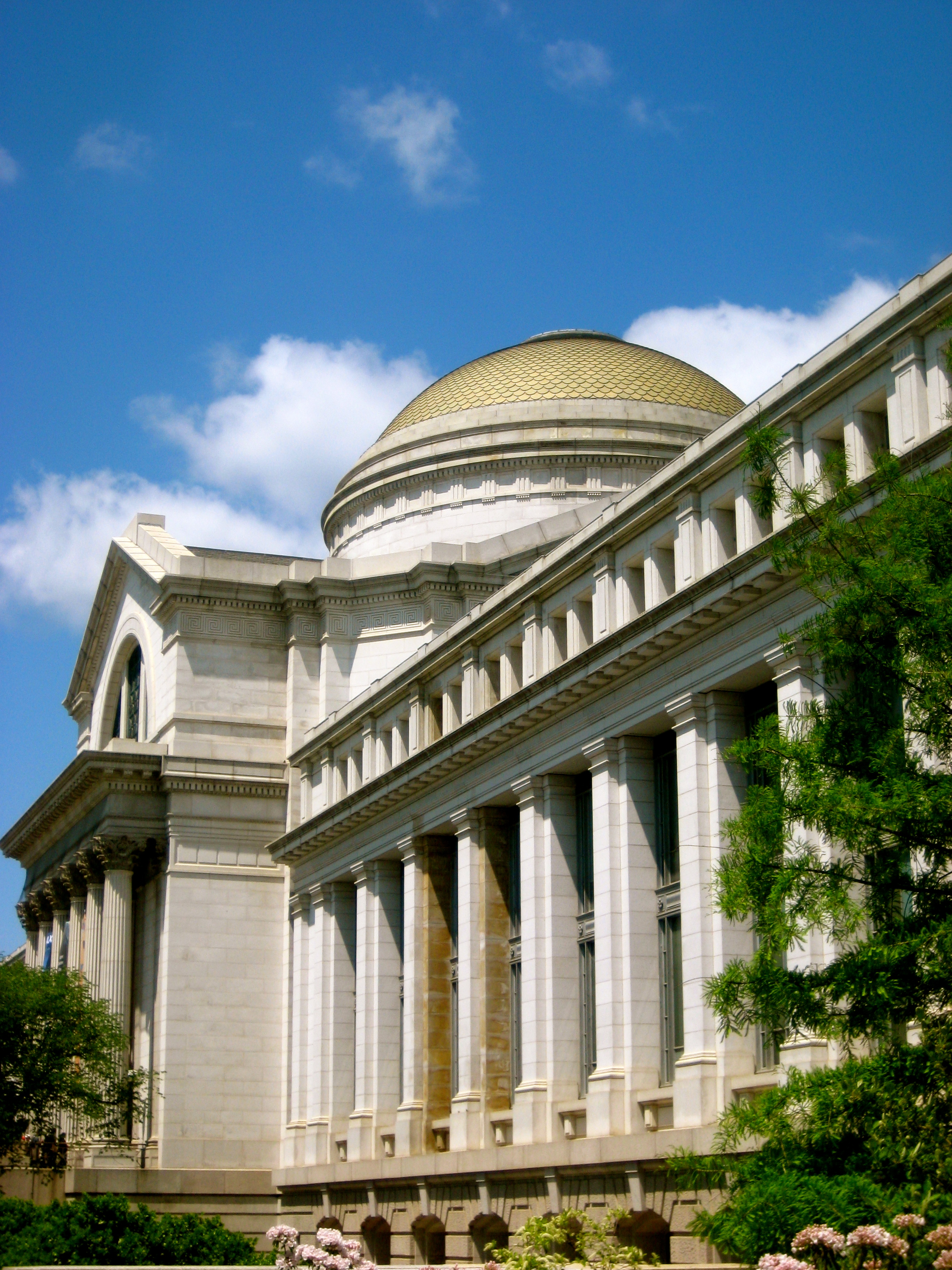
Smithsonian National Museum of Natural History

In its 53-day run at the Smithsonian, from November 9 to December 31, 1983 (excluding Christmas Day), the exhibit was seen by more than 110,000 visitors, breaking the museum's record for visitors to a special exhibit. Daily attendance averaged 2,074 persons. Due to the tremendous demand, a cap was placed on visitors in the exhibition rooms, with 256 people officially allowed at any one time. However, museum officials did permit up to 100 additional visitors into the exhibit at peak demand hours.

Herman Berlinski was commissioned to create the musical piece Ets Chayim (Tree of Life) for the opening at the Smithsonian. The 288-page exhibition catalogue, The Precious Legacy: Judaic Treasures from the Czechoslovak State Collections (Simon & Schuster, 1983), was edited by David Altshuler, part of the team that curated the exhibit. Jack Granek of The Toronto Star found the catalogue to be "lavishly illustrated" with essays of "illuminating scholarship, linking religion, Judaica and history". However, John Bentley Mays of The Globe and Mail felt it "should never have been published" in its current state, lacking information on iconography, stylistic features, and the interest in gathering and preserving the collection by dissimilar organizations. The Canadian government had the catalogue translated and printed in French for the Canadian exhibitions.

Beginning in 1984 the exhibit traveled across the United States under the auspices of the Smithsonian Institution Traveling Exhibition Service. It showed at the Bass Museum in Miami Beach from January 23 to March 18, 1984; the Jewish Museum in New York City from April 15 to August 26, 1984; the San Diego Museum of Art from September 22 to November 11, 1984; the New Orleans Museum of Art from December 16, 1984 to February 10, 1985; the Detroit Institute of Arts from March 12 to May 15, 1985; and the Wadsworth Atheneum in Hartford, Connecticut, from June 3 to July 29, 1985.

The exhibit drew 93,000 attendees in Miami Beach, where 70% of residents were Jewish, 100,000 in San Diego, and 40,000 in Hartford, the last stop on the U.S. tour. A 1985 curatorial report by the Detroit Institute of the Arts called The Precious Legacy "the major exhibition of the year" and noted that it and "a full program of related educational activities, lectures, concerts, and films" were well received. All told, the exhibit, described as a "blockbuster" event, drew more than 550,000 visitors during its U.S. tour.

A brouhaha erupted in Los Angeles when the public learned that the Los Angeles County Museum of Art had turned down the exhibit and that it would instead go to the then far smaller city of San Diego. According to a survey later commissioned by the San Diego Museum of Art, The Precious Legacy exhibit produced "total direct, indirect and induced effects" of $12.7 million in municipal sales and $120,000 in transient occupancy and sales tax revenues.

=== Canada ===
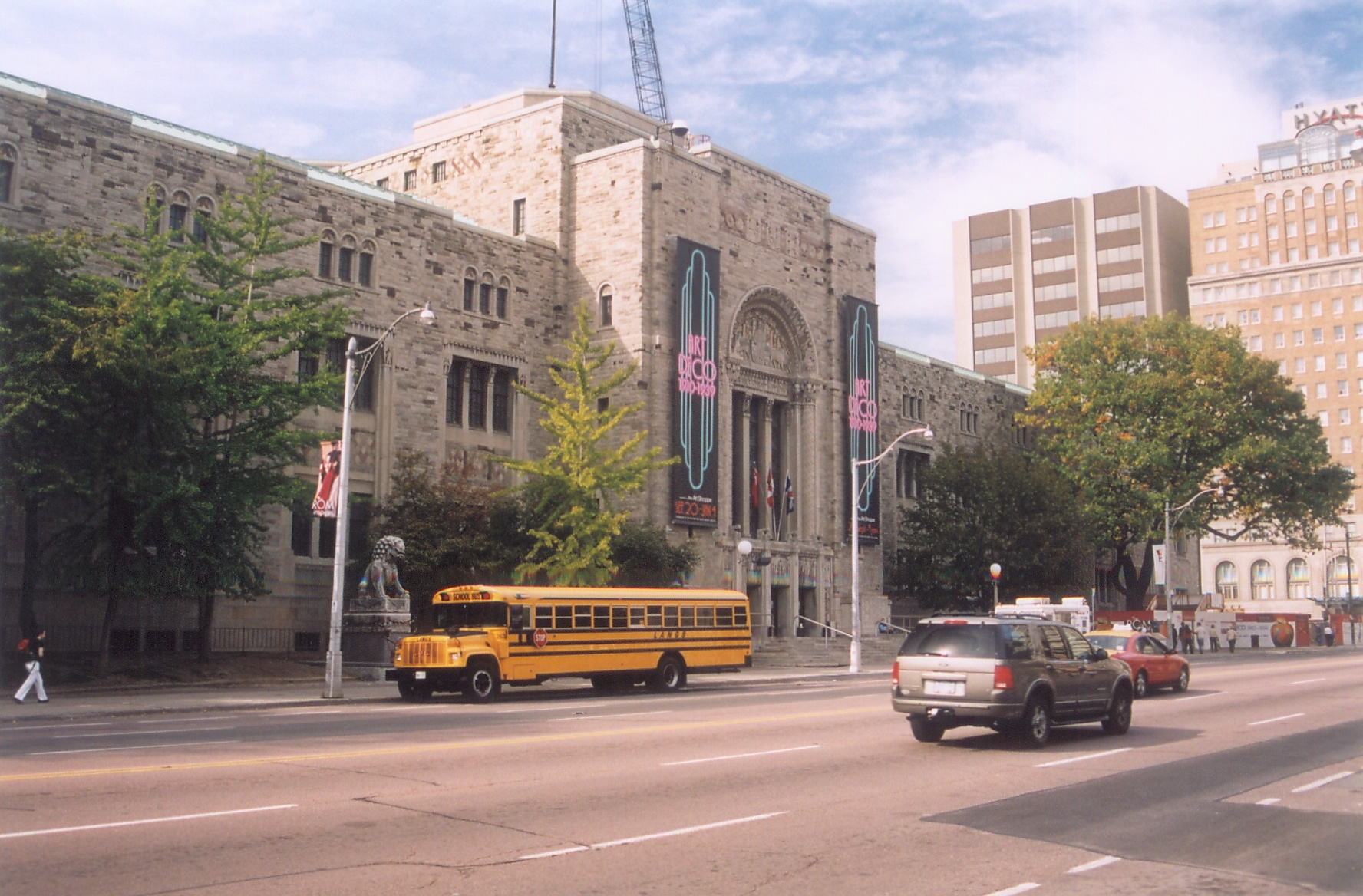
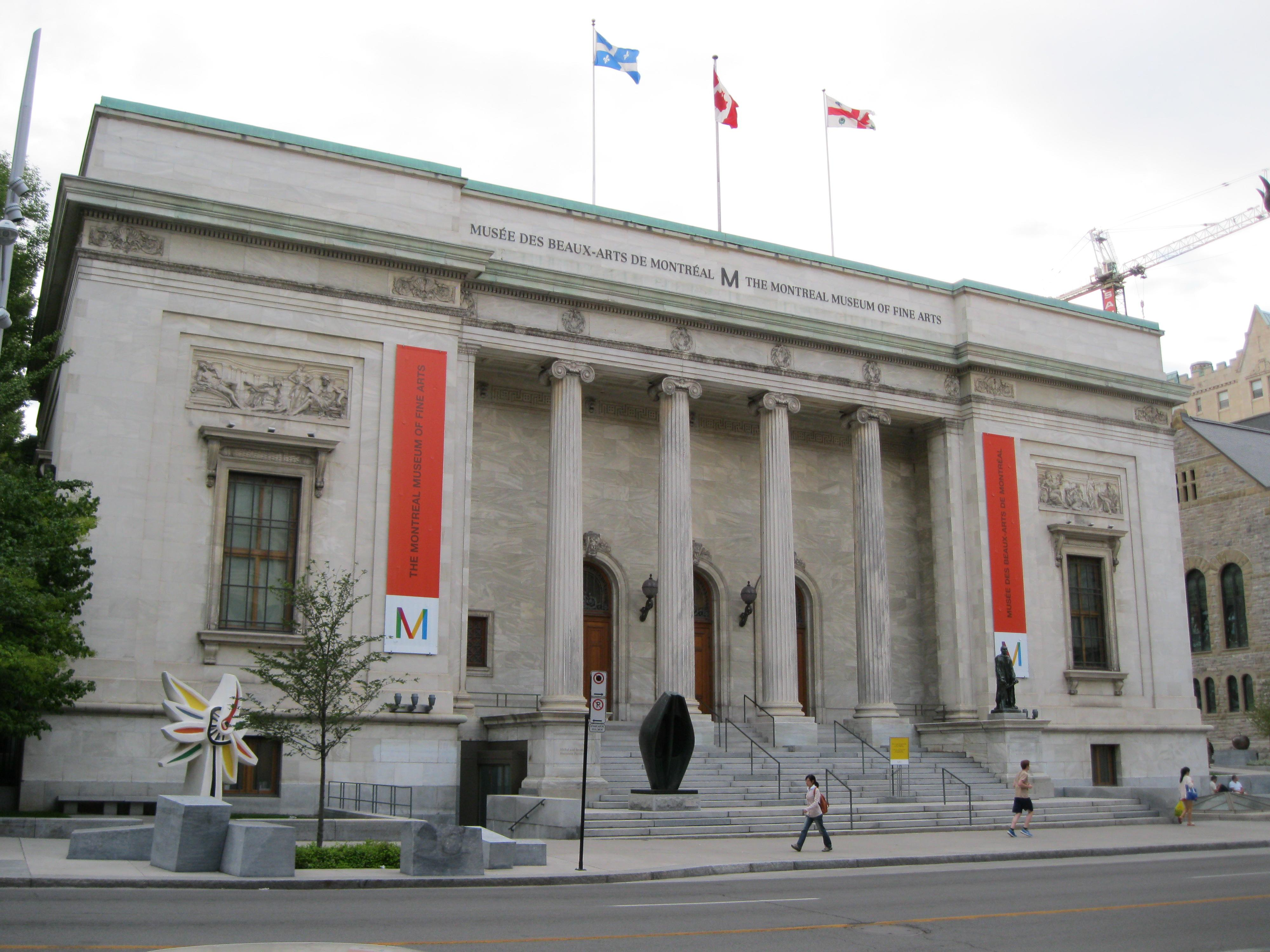
Royal Ontario Museum (top) Montreal Museum of Fine Arts (bottom)

After its U.S. tour concluded, the exhibit traveled to Canada, where it appeared in Toronto, Calgary, and Montreal before returning to the State Jewish Museum in Prague. The Canadian tour began with a highly publicized opening at the Royal Ontario Museum (ROM) in Toronto, with every key person who helped launch The Precious Legacy flown in for a press conference. The ROM shows ran from September 14 to November 24, 1985, with more than 60 related special events, including a lecture series, a concert series, family matinees, music, dance and comedy performances, readings, and screenings of dramatic and documentary films. Toronto has one of the world's largest Czech Jewish communities, and three Czech-expatriate Canadian Jewish Holocaust survivors gave interviews at a press preview of the exhibit. The ROM shows coincided with the 40th anniversary of the end of the Holocaust, and also with the high holidays of the Jewish New Year, beginning on September 15 with Rosh Hashana, a time for reflection and reaffirming faith. The ROM also created its first themed dinner menu with traditional Middle-European Jewish dishes.

Attendance at the exhibit in Toronto was approximately 80,000 between September 14 and October 27, when the ROM experienced its first labour strikes. Approximately 300 workers from two unions went on strike for job security. On September 10, Ontario's Minister of Culture had crossed an informational picket line in order to attend a reception for the exhibition. The labour dispute was settled on November 2 with minimal disruption to the exhibition.

The next series of Canadian showings were at the Glenbow Museum in Calgary from January 2 to March 9, 1986. The museum expected 750 guests to attend a private opening. Cameron and the Glenbow Museum managed the Canadian tour. The last stop of the Canadian tour was the Montreal Museum of Fine Arts (MMFA), where the exhibit was on display from April 11 to May 25. A guided introduction to the collection was available in English, French, Yiddish, and Hebrew. The exhibit coincided with the eight-day festival of Passover (beginning April 23).

=== Israel ===
The exhibition Jewish Treasures from Prague was shown at the Israel Museum in Jerusalem, Israel, from May 15 to August 20, 1990. In addition to pieces from the museum's permanent collection, it included more than 200 objects plus children's drawings loaned from the State Jewish Museum in Prague. While the North American installations provided a message on the durability of Jewish life, this is already self-evident in Israel where the exhibition ended with death at Terezín. Czechoslovak president Václav Havel made a state visit during the exhibition to restore diplomatic relations which had been suspended after the Six-Day War of 1967; he asked to tour several cultural institutions and visited the exhibition at the Israel Museum together with Jerusalem Mayor Teddy Kollek.

=== Sweden, New Zealand, Australia ===
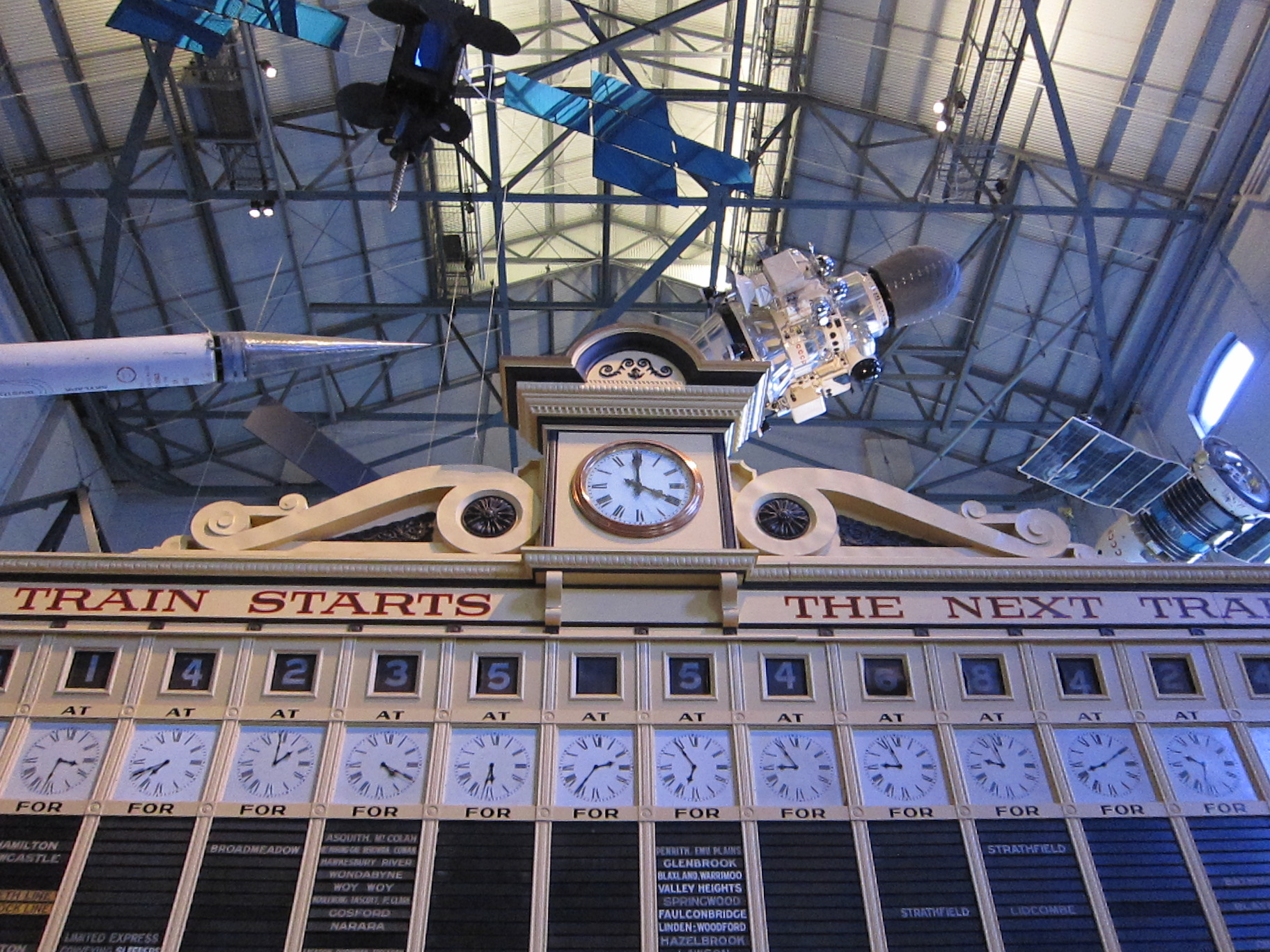
Powerhouse Museum

Following more than a year of preparations, the travelling exhibition was relaunched for a two-year tour in 1998. The tour opened in Sweden, then travelled to New Zealand and ended in Australia. The exhibition in Sweden featured about 250 objects from the collection of the Jewish Museum in Prague, while over 300 objects were included on the Australian tour. The exhibition had the same five-section layout as the earlier North American tour, with themes of Jewish holidays, family life, education, burial societies, and the work of those at Terezín.

The tour opened at the Prins Eugens Waldemarsudde museum in Stockholm, Sweden, under the name Det judiska Prag (English: Jewish Prague). It was on exhibition from January 22 to April 5, 1998.

The Project Judaica Foundation helped bring the exhibition to New Zealand, where it was shown at the Auckland War Memorial Museum from July 31 to October 26, 1998. It was well received as the primary exhibition of the year, with attendance of 25,000. The museum had opened a Holocaust Gallery in 1997.

The exhibit was shown at the Powerhouse Museum in Sydney, Australia, from December 17, 1998, to February 28, 1999, curated by Jana Vytrhlíková. The tour then made its final stop at the Immigration Museum in Melbourne, where it was shown from March 25 to June 13, 1999. It was the first major exhibition of Judaica in Australia.

== Impact ==
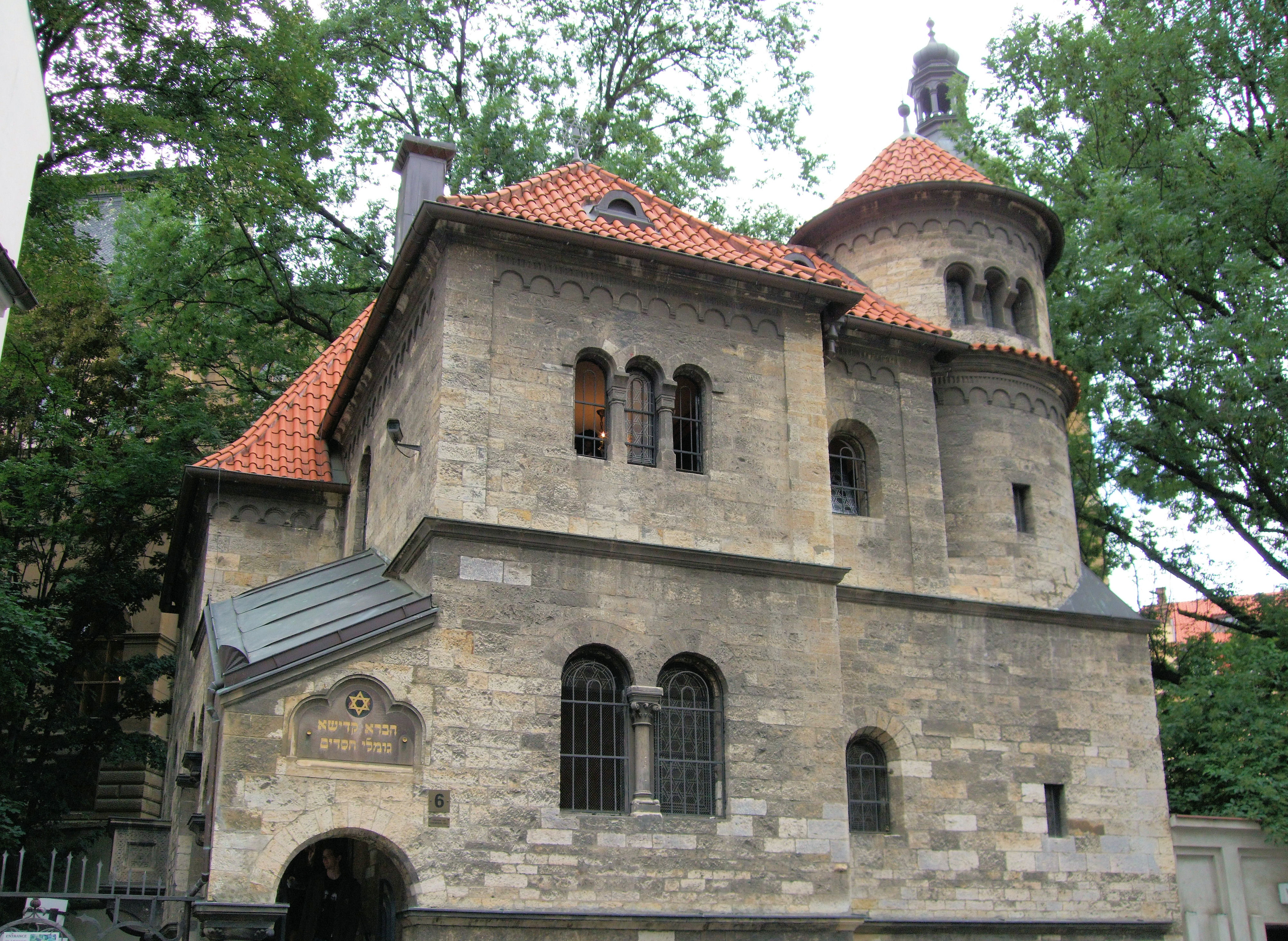
Jewish Ceremonial Hall in Prague's old Jewish quarter

The U.S. tour, held while Prague was behind the Iron Curtain, made people in the West aware of the Jewish art and buildings that had survived the Nazi and Communist regimes. It sparked tourism to Prague to see the State Jewish Museum and the old synagogues and Josefov, the city's old Jewish quarter. U.S. tourism increased by 40 percent between 1983 and 1985. By 1986, Sylvie Wittmann, lay leader of Bejt Simcha, a Progressive Jewish congregation in Prague, was leading tours of Josefov and the nearby Theresienstadt Ghetto.

The Precious Legacy was also the title of a 1986 American television documentary depicting the Judaica artifacts stored in Prague and the city's modern-day Jewish community. The 29-minute film was broadcast on PBS on February 24, 1985, and was screened daily at the Royal Ontario Museum theatre while the exhibit was on display that year. The exhibition also led to another half-hour documentary, "A Journey to Prague", televised as part of the Canadian documentary series Man Alive in January 1987. The program follows Otto Lowy as he tours the exhibit at the Montreal Museum of Fine Arts, then travels to the museum in Prague, recalling his youth in the Jewish quarter and how he was sent to safety days before the Nazi invasion.

== Bibliography ==
- Altshuler, David A., ed. (1983). The Precious Legacy: Judaic Treasures from the Czechoslovak State Collections. Simon & Schuster. ISBN 978-0671494483.
- Vytrhlik, Jana, ed. (1998). Precious Legacy: Treasures from the Jewish Museum in Prague. Powerhouse Publishing. ISBN 978-1863170758. (reprinted 2002)
