= Georgi Vins =

Soviet Baptist pastor and human rights activist

Georgi Petrovich Vins (Russian: Георгий Петрович Винс; 4 August 1928 – 11 January 1998) was a Russian Baptist pastor persecuted by the Soviet authorities for his involvement in a network of independent Baptist churches. Following an agreement between Soviet leader Leonid Brezhnev and U.S. President Jimmy Carter, Vins and his family were expelled from the Soviet Union in 1979 with a group of other dissidents (Alexander Ginzburg, Eduard Kuznetsov, Mark Dymshits and Valentin Moroz) in exchange for two convicted spies, Rudolf Chernyaev and Valdik Enger.

== Life in the Soviet Union ==
Georgi Vins was born in the Russian Far East to Peter Vins, an American citizen of Russian origin who had traveled to Siberia just two years before as a missionary, and Lydia (Zharikova) Vins. Peter was arrested in 1930, freed three years later but re-arrested in 1935 and died in prison in 1943. The family was only later informed of his death. Peter Vins was the son of Mennonite Brethren leader Jacob J. Wiens born in Borden, Saskatchewan. See also: "Jacob J. Wiens was born in Russia", "Винс Яков Яковлевич родился в России в семье обрусевших выходцев из Голландии. Член Церкви евангельских христиан-баптистов.".

The young Georgi was brought up by his mother Lydia, with his various siblings. After the Second World War they moved to Kiev, where Vins qualified as an electrical engineer.

Georgi Vins became involved in Baptist churches in Kiev. As Nikita Khrushchev's anti-religious persecutions began in 1959, the state imposed new regulations on the Baptist church that drastically curtailed the small measure of independence they had enjoyed. As the Baptist movement split acrimoniously, Vins became one of the leading figures in the campaign to resist state pressure. He publicly opposed the pastor of his own congregation, in Kiev, who had accepted the new measures. Vins formed his own breakaway congregation, becoming its pastor, despite a lack of formal theological training. The group met in a forest outside Kiev.

When the Council of Churches was formally set up as an underground body in 1965, Vins became its General Secretary. Hundreds of the movement's followers were already in prison. In a dramatic protest, Baptists converged from all over the Soviet Union for a mass demonstration outside the Central Committee building in Moscow. Several days later, Vins went to the Central Committee with other leaders to ask about the fate of those who had been detained at the unprecedented demonstration. As a result, they were themselves arrested. Vins and the Chairman of the Council of Churches, Gennady Kryuchkov, went on trial in November 1966 and he was sentenced to three years imprisonment. His wife Nadezhda was left to look after their four children.

After release, Vins resumed his work as pastor and organizer of the movement, but soon went into hiding to avoid arrest. He was discovered and seized in March 1974. Prodded by the human rights campaigner Andrei Sakharov, the World Council of Churches joined the international protests at Vins' arrest. Vins was tried in Kiev in January 1975 and sentenced to five years in labor camp to be followed by five years internal exile, becoming the Soviet Union's most famous religious prisoner.

== Later life ==
International pressure led to his dramatic expulsion from his homeland. On 26 April 1979 Vins was awakened in prison and told to change into his own clothes. Unaware of his imminent change of circumstances, he was flown to Moscow, where he spent the night in a center for vagrants. The following day he was issued new clothes and informed that because of his anti-Soviet activity the Presidium of the Supreme Soviet had stripped him of his Soviet citizenship. He was being expelled. Vins protested in vain that his activity was not anti-Soviet, but had to bow to the inevitable. He was told to write down the names of his close relatives so that they could leave the country with him. Realizing that he would be unlikely to see them again otherwise, he listed his wife, children, mother and niece.

Vins was driven to Moscow's Lefortovo prison and then all five expellees were taken to Moscow airport. Two American embassy officials on the plane explained that their release followed an agreement between the White House and the Soviet embassy in Washington, DC. It was not until the plane landed in New York City that they learned they were being exchanged for two convicted spies, and the handover took place in an isolated hangar at Kennedy airport. The five walked off the plane at one end while the spies walked on at the other.

Joined in the United States six weeks later by the rest of his family, Vins made the town of Elkhart, Indiana his home and learned English. He received invitations to the White House and to innumerable events around the world. At first there was competition between missions supporting persecuted churches in the Soviet Union to enlist him, but Vins kept his distance. He eventually set up the international representation of the Baptist churches in the Soviet Union that owed their allegiance to the Council of Churches, a group of tightly knit congregations that categorically rejected any compromises with the Soviet authorities and refused to register officially. Their members were suffering persecution, with hundreds in labor camps or psychiatric hospitals. His displacement to the USA led to the rest of his extended family (siblings and their families) to travel from the Ukrainian SSR to start a new life in a free country.

Vins' work aiding Baptist victims of persecution changed dramatically in the late 1980s, when open Christian work in Russia became possible. In 1990, President Mikhail Gorbachev revoked the decree that had stripped Vins of his Soviet citizenship, thereby allowing him to revisit his homeland. In the 1990s Vins made numerous preaching trips, especially in Russia and Ukraine. In 1995 he was allowed access, in Moscow, to his father's KGB case file, and Vins finally learned that his father had been executed in 1937.

Vins discovered in late 1997 that he had a malignant inoperable brain tumor, from which he died in 1998.

His sister-in-law Maria Glukhoman died in Arvada, CO in 2014.

Georgi's son, Peter Vins, returned to Russia in the 1990s, and founded a shipping firm.

== See also ==
- Gulag
- Aleksandr Solzhenitsyn
