= Dymshits–Kuznetsov hijacking affair =

1970 aircraft hijacking attempt

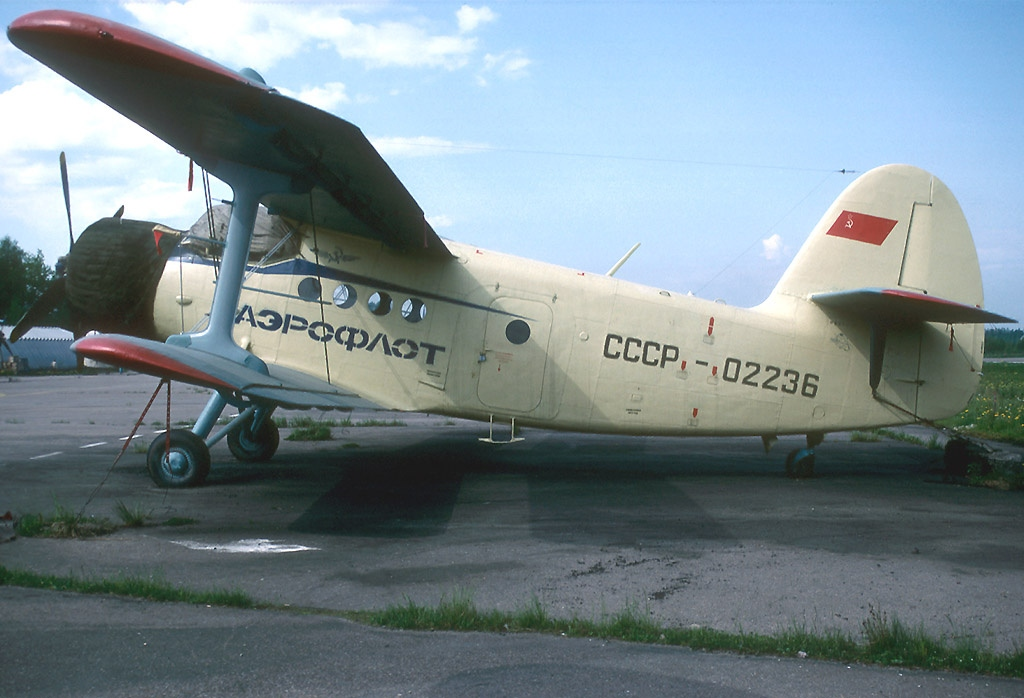
Aeroflot's An-2, the same plane Dymshits–Kuznetsov group tried to hijack

The Dymshits–Kuznetsov aircraft hijacking affair, also known as The First Leningrad Trial or Operation Wedding (Russian: Ленинградское самолётное дело, or Дело группы Дымшица-Кузнецова) (Leningrad Airplaine Affair), was an attempt to hijack a small civilian aircraft on 15 June 1970 by a group of 16 Soviet refuseniks in order to escape to Israel. Even though the attempt was unsuccessful, it was a notable event in the course of the Cold War because it drew international attention to human rights violations in the Soviet Union and resulted in the temporary loosening of emigration restrictions.

== Background ==
Emigration from the Soviet Bloc was severely restricted for all citizens, regardless of nationality, ethnicity or religion.

In the wake of the 1967 Arab–Israeli War, the Soviet Union broke off diplomatic relations with Israel. A large number of Soviet Jews applied for exit visas to leave the Soviet Union. The process of applying for an exit visa often cost applicants their jobs, which in turn made them vulnerable to charges of social parasitism, a criminal offense. While some were allowed to leave, many were refused permission to emigrate, either immediately or after their cases had gone through the OVIR (ОВиР, "Отдел Виз и Регистрации", "Otdel Viz i Registratsii", English: Office of Visas and Registration), the MVD (Soviet Ministry of Internal Affairs) department responsible for exit visas. In many instances, the reason given for denial was that these persons had been given access to information vital to Soviet national security.

== Incident ==
In 1970, a group of sixteen Refuseniks were organized by dissident Edward Kuznetsov, who had previously served a seven-year term in prison for publishing Phoenix-61, a samizdat poetry collection.

The group plotted to buy all the seats on a small 12-seater Antonov An-2 (colloquially known as "кукурузник," kukuruznik) making a local flight from Leningrad to Priozersk, under the guise of a trip to a wedding. They then planned to overpower the pilots before takeoff from an intermediate stop and fly to Sweden. Their final goal was Israel. One of the participants, Mark Dymshits, was a former military pilot, who had experience flying the An-2s. The group called the plan "Operation Wedding".

The plan was set in motion in June 1970. On the morning of 15 June, the group arrived together in Smolny Airport near Leningrad, only to be arrested by the KGB.

== Aftermath ==
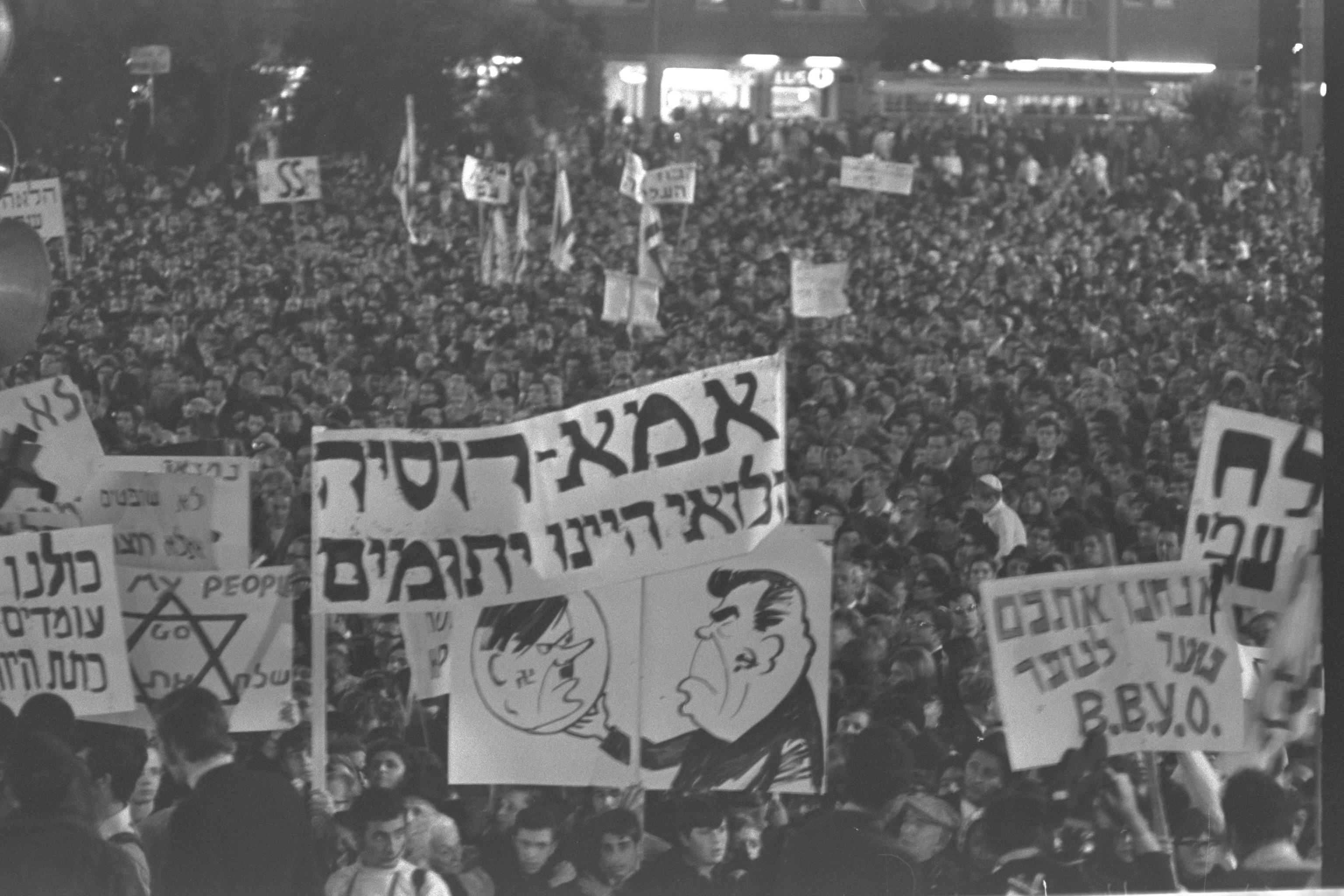
A protest rally is held against the death penalty at Kikar Malchei Israel in Tel Aviv

The arrests and subsequent trial of the eleven alleged hijackers were followed by a broader Soviet campaign against Jewish nationalists and activists, with arrests and other forms of persecution reported in Leningrad, Riga, Kishinev, Sukhumi, Odessa, and elsewhere. The affair also became part of international human-rights debates surrounding the Soviet Union. Western supporters of Soviet Jews drew comparisons between the treatment of the Leningrad hijackers and the persecution of African Americans in the United States. The Soviet government's prominent campaign in support of Angela Davis may have helped divert international attention from its treatment of Jewish dissidents.

The accused were charged with high treason, punishable by death under Article 64 of the penal code of the Russian Soviet Federative Socialist Republic (RSFSR). In a trial that took place from 15 to 24 December 1970, Mark Dymshits (age: 43) and Eduard Kuznetsov (age: 31) received death sentences. The prison sentences received by nine other participants were: Sylva Zalmanson (age: 25; then Kuznetsov's wife, and the only woman on trial), 10 years; Yosef Mendelevitch (age: 23) and Yuri Fedorov, 15 years; Oleksii Murzhenko (age: 28), 14 years; Arie (Leib) Hanoch (age: 25), 13 years; Anatoli Altmann (age: 28), 12 years; Boris Penson (age: 23), 10 years; Israel Zalmanson (age: 21), 8 years; and Mendel Bodnya (age: 32), 4 years. Wolf Zalmanson (age: 31), brother of Sylva and Israel Zalmanson, who was a lieutenant in the Soviet army, was tried separately by a military tribunal and, on 2 January 1971, sentenced to 10 years imprisonment. After international protests, the Judicial Commission for Criminal Cases of the RSFSR Supreme Court in Moscow considered an appeal of the cases. The capital sentences of Dymshits and Kuznetsov were commuted to 15 years in hard labor prison, while the prison terms for several other defendants were reduced by two to five years.

Soon after the trial, strong international condemnations caused the Soviet authorities to significantly increase the emigration quota. In the years 1960 through 1970, only 4,000 people had (legally) emigrated from the USSR; after the trial, in the period from 1971 to 1980, 347,100 people received a visa to leave the USSR, of whom 245,951 were Jews.

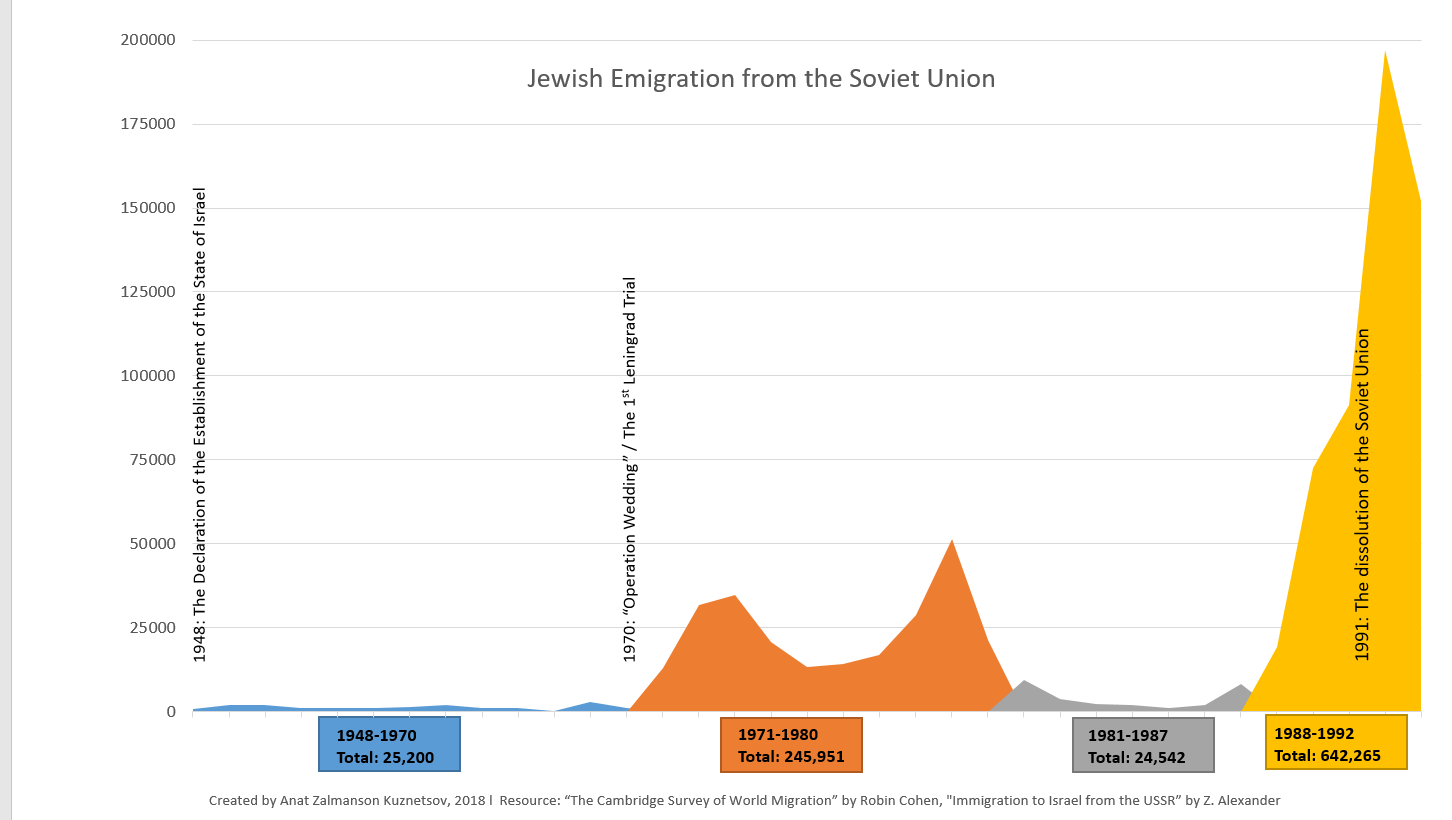
Jewish emigration from USSR, before and after the First Leningrad Trial

In August 1974, Sylva Zalmanson was released as part of an Israeli secret Soviet prisoner exchange with the spy Yuri Linov that took place in Berlin, after which she immigrated to Israel, arriving in September. In the following years she advocated for the release of her husband, Edward Kuznetsov, and other dissidents.

Kuznetsov was finally released on 27 April 1979, and joined his wife in Israel. Mark Dymshits was released at the same time, along with three other prominent Soviet dissidents, Aleksandr Ginzburg, Valentin Moroz, and Georgy Vins. The release of the five dissidents came after long negotiations as part of a prisoner exchange for two Soviet foreign intelligence officers, Rudolf Chernyaev and Valdik Enger. The Soviet operatives, who were employed at the time at the United Nations Secretariat, had been sentenced in a U.S. federal court to 50 years in prison, in October 1978, following their arrest in New Jersey the previous May, while collecting an agent's report from a secret cache (a co-conspirator, Vladimir Zinyakin, an attaché of the Soviet mission to the UN, had diplomatic immunity, and was not charged).

After immigrating to Israel, Kuznetsov headed the news department of "Radio Liberty" (1983–1990), and was the chief editor of the largest Israeli Russian-language newspaper, Вести (1990–1999), the most popular Russian-language newspaper outside of Russia.

"The Committee to Free the Leningrad Three," headed by Colorado State Senator Tilman Bishop, was instrumental in organizing grassroots and diplomatic campaigns to release the remaining prisoners.

In February 1981, Mendelevitch was released and joined his family in Israel. He urged continuance of the campaign to free two members of the group, Fedorov and Murzhenko: "The fact that both are non-Jewish is the worst example of Soviet discrimination and must not pass without protest."

On 15 June 1984, Murzhenko (1942-1999) was released, only to be rearrested for parole violation and sentenced to another two years; he was released 4 June 1987 and immigrated to the USA in February 1988. In June 1985, after serving 15 years, Yuri Fedorov was released under the 101st kilometre settlement restriction. He was denied an exit visa until 1988, when he left for the United States. In 1998, he founded The Gratitude Fund in order to commemorate the Soviet dissidents "who waged a war against Soviet power and sacrificed their personal freedom and their lives for democracy."

In 2016, Operation Wedding, a documentary about the hijacking directed by Anat Zalmanson-Kuznetsov, the daughter of Kuznetsov and Sylva Zalmanson, two participants in the plot, was released.

== See also ==
- Eastern Bloc emigration and defection
- Jackson–Vanik amendment

== Notes ==
- ИСТОРИЯ ИНАКОМЫСЛИЯ В СССР (The History of Dissident Movement in the USSR) by Ludmila Alekseyeva. Vilnius, 1992 (Russian)
- "The Leningrad trial of the 'hijackers'," A Chronicle of Current Events (17.6), 31 December 1970, and compare
- "The Aeroplane affair", A Chronicle of Current Events (20.1), 2 July 1971.
