= David Altshuler (curator) =

American scholar and museum director

David Altshuler is an American scholar and museum director.

== Career ==
Altshuler was the Charles E. Smith Professor of Judaic Studies at George Washington University.

He was the founding director of the Museum of Jewish Heritage in New York City, a position he held from 1984 until December 1999, when he left to become president of the Trust for Jewish Philanthropy.

He was a curator of the exhibition, The Precious Legacy, at the Smithsonian's National Museum of Natural History in 1983.

== Books ==
- The Jews of Washington, D.C.: a communal history anthology, editor. Jewish Historical Society of Greater Washington, Rossel Books, c1985.
- The Precious Legacy: Judaic Treasures from the Czechoslovak State Collection, editor. Exhibit catalogue. (Simon & Schuster, 1983).
