= Sylva Zalmanson =

Soviet-born Israeli human rights activist, artist and engineer

- Сильва Залмансон
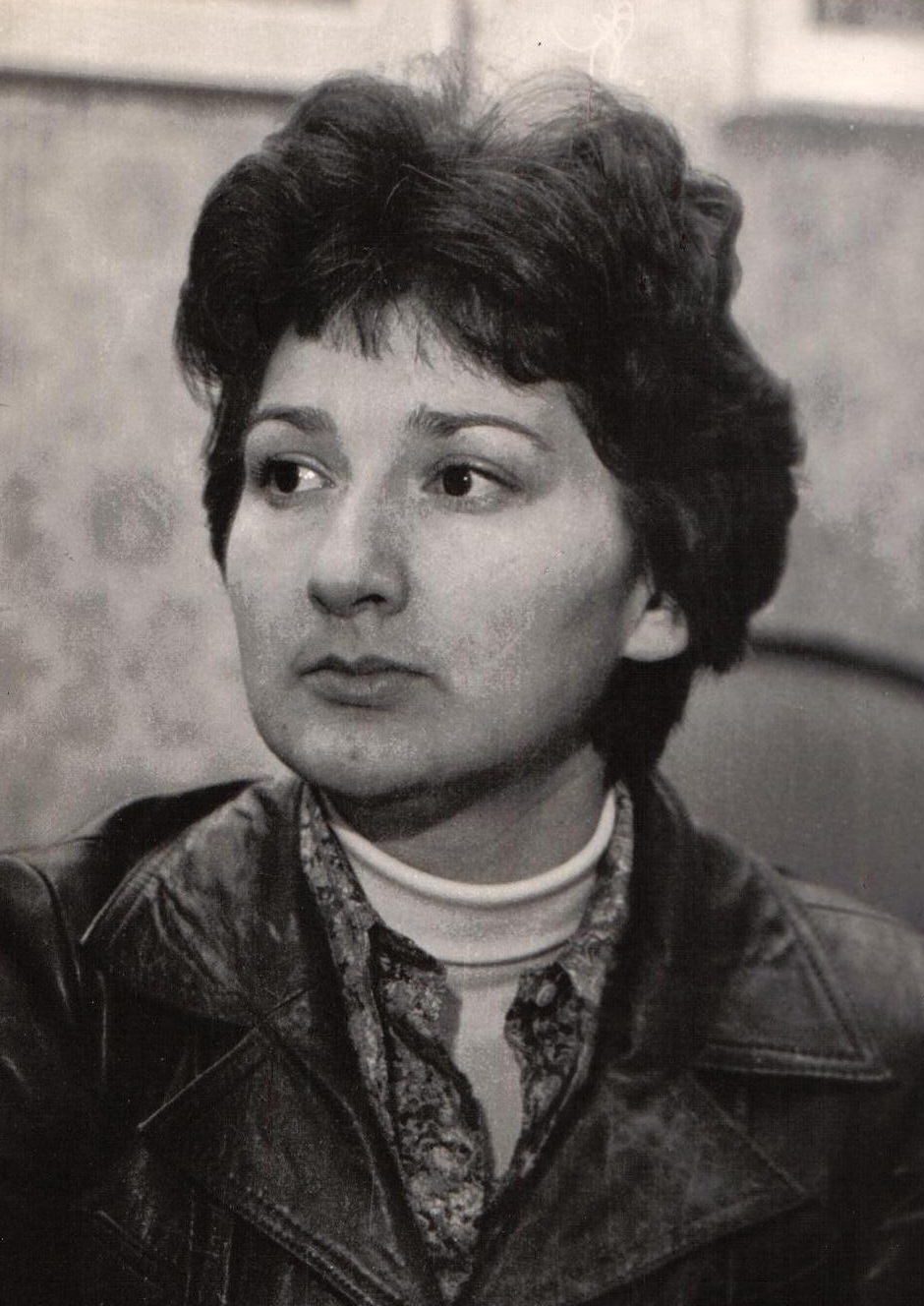
- Zalmanson in 1977
- Born: 25 October 1944 (age 81); Siberia, Soviet Union
- Education: Riga Polytechnic University
- Occupation: Engineer
- Known for: Prisoner of Zion

Sylva Zalmanson (Russian: Сильва Залмансон, Hebrew: סילווה זלמנסון; born Siberia, 1944) is a Soviet-born Jewish Prisoner of Zion, human rights activist, artist and engineer who made aliyah to Israel in 1974.

Sylva Zalmanson was most memorable with the stringing and hunting effect, not heard since the publication of Anne Frank's diary of a young girl

— A. Phillip Spiegel, Triumph over Tyranny 2008 (2008)

== Early life ==
Born in Siberia in 1944 to a middle-class Jewish family from Riga. The family escaped the German invasion and returned to Riga in 1945, after the Soviets defeated the Nazis and re-occupied Latvia. While she was a university student at the Riga Polytechnic University, she became engaged in Zionist activities, distributing Hebrew-language study books to different Jewish communities around the Soviet Union, listening to Israel Radio programs in Russian, and other activities that were considered illegal under Soviet law.

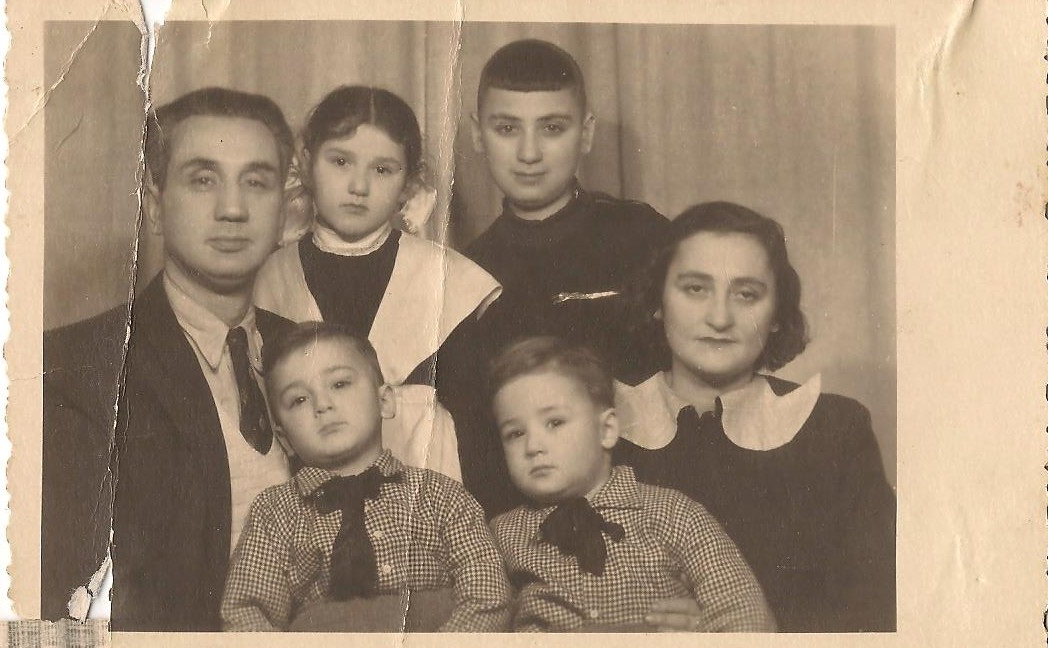
Zalmanson family in Riga 1952

Zalmanson graduated Riga Polytechnic University in 1968, worked as an engineer, and dreamed of living in Israel. Repeatedly requesting and being denied an exit visa to leave the Soviet Union for Israel, Zalmanson and her husband Eduard Kuznetsov became members of a group of activists in a Zionist underground cell which came up with a plan to escape.

== The Leningrad plane hijackers case ==
The plan was called "Operation Wedding," (AKA Dymshits–Kuznetsov hijacking affair): the 16-member group would buy all the tickets to a local flight as if they are going to a wedding. Once on board, they would take over the controls of the "borrowed" government plane, and Major Mark Dymshits, a former Soviet military pilot and Jewish refusenik, would fly the aircraft, under the radar, over the Soviet border into Sweden. Sylva recruited most of the group members, including her husband Eduard Kuznetsov and two brothers: Wolf Zalmanson and Israel Zalmanson. Aware that the KGB was watching and waiting, thanks to an informant, they nevertheless decided to go through with the plan.

On 15 June 1970, moments before boarding the Antonov An-2, the group was arrested and tried for "high treason". Sylva was the only woman on the trial that took place on 15 December 1970, and the first to go up the stand, she said:

"If you had not denied us our right to leave Russia, this group wouldn't exist. We would just leave for Israel with no desire of hijacking a plane or any other thing that's illegal. Even here, on trial, I still believe I'll make it someday to Israel. I feel I'm the Jewish people's heiress so I'll quote our sayings (in Hebrew) Next year in Jerusalem and If I forget thee, O Jerusalem, let my right hand forget her cunning."
(Hebrew: לְשָׁנָה הַבָאָה בִּירוּשָלַיִם Hebrew: אִם אֶשְׁכָּחֵךְ יְרוּשָׁלָ‍ִם תִּשְׁכַּח יְמִינִי)

Sylva received 10 years in Soviet Gulag: 3 years for the escape attempt, 7 years for "anti-Soviet propaganda", referring to Sylva's distribution of Hebrew learning books. Sylva's husband Edward Kuznetsov and the group's pilot, Mark Dymshits, received a death sentence. The death sentences were reduced to 15 years after only 8 days, due to massive free world pressure. The Let My People Go! campaign brought awareness to the world and tens of thousands of people demonstrated all over the world demanding the release of the activists and that Soviet Jews were given the opportunity to emigrate.

== Migration to Israel before and after the trial ==
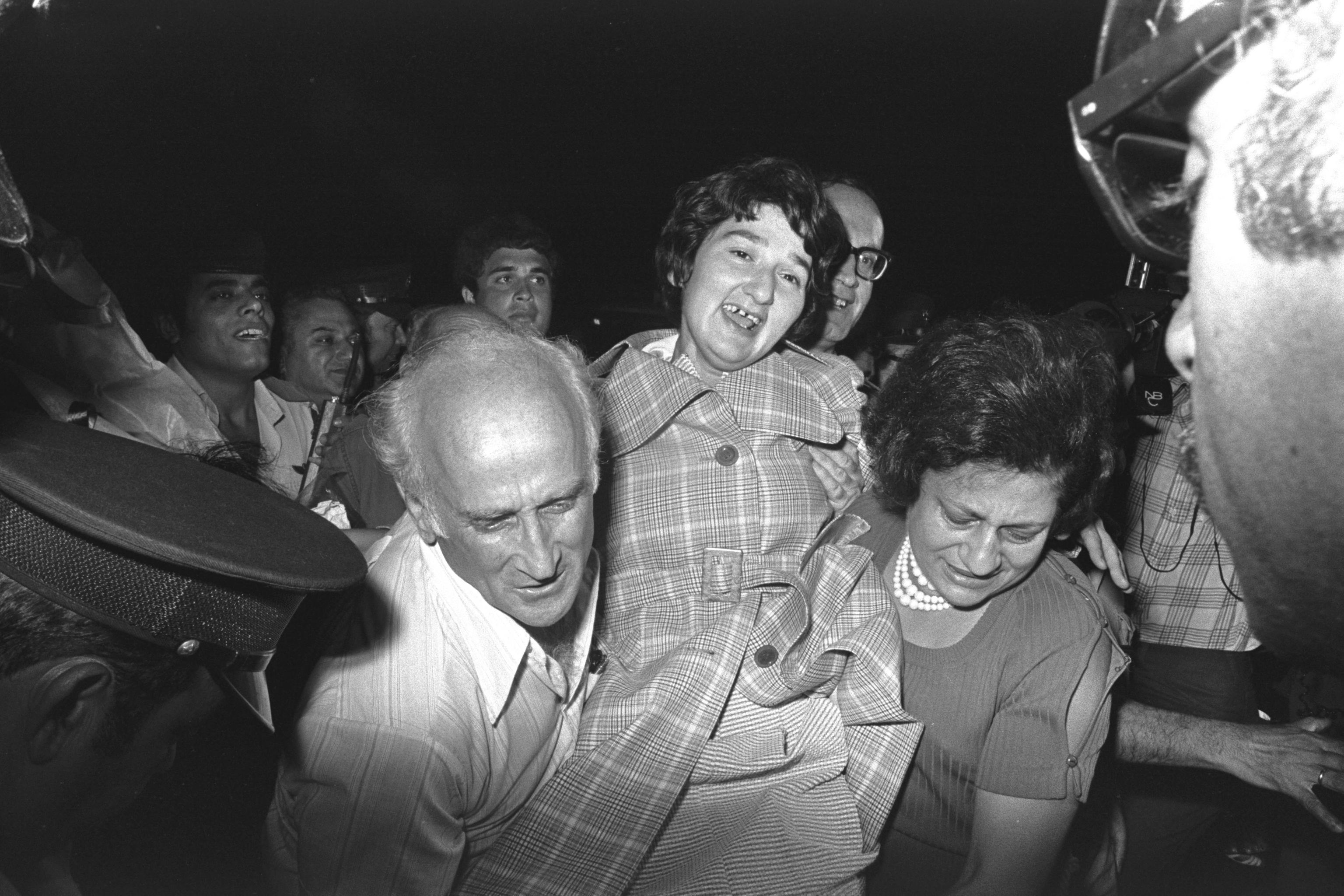
Zalmanson being carried by her relatives at the arrival to Ben Gurion Airport, 1974

During the time Zalmanson and the other Zionist activists were imprisoned, and as a result of the diplomatic pressure put on the Soviet authorities, hundreds of thousands of Jews received visas to leave. Between 1948 and the trial, 10,720 Soviet Jews left the Soviet Union. After the trial and until 1979, around 300,000 Soviet Jews emigrated.

== From prison to freedom ==
Sylva spent four years in Potma women’s penal colony and was later put in solitary confinement, after hitting another camp's inmate who made anti-semitic remarks. On 22 August 1974, Sylva got an early release, due to a secret prisoners exchange between the Soviet government and the Israeli government who caught a Soviet spy, Yuri Linov who was exchanged for Sylva Zalmanson and Heinrich Shefter, a Bulgarian Jew, UN employee who was arrested by the Bulgarian Security Service and sentenced to death for espionage, apparently solely for the purpose of extorting Linov's release.

In Israel, Sylva worked as an engineer in the aerial industry but continued her non-stop activity for the release of her family and friends, including a 16-day hunger strike in front of the United Nations headquarters in New York in 1976, refusing to eat to the point of losing consciousness.

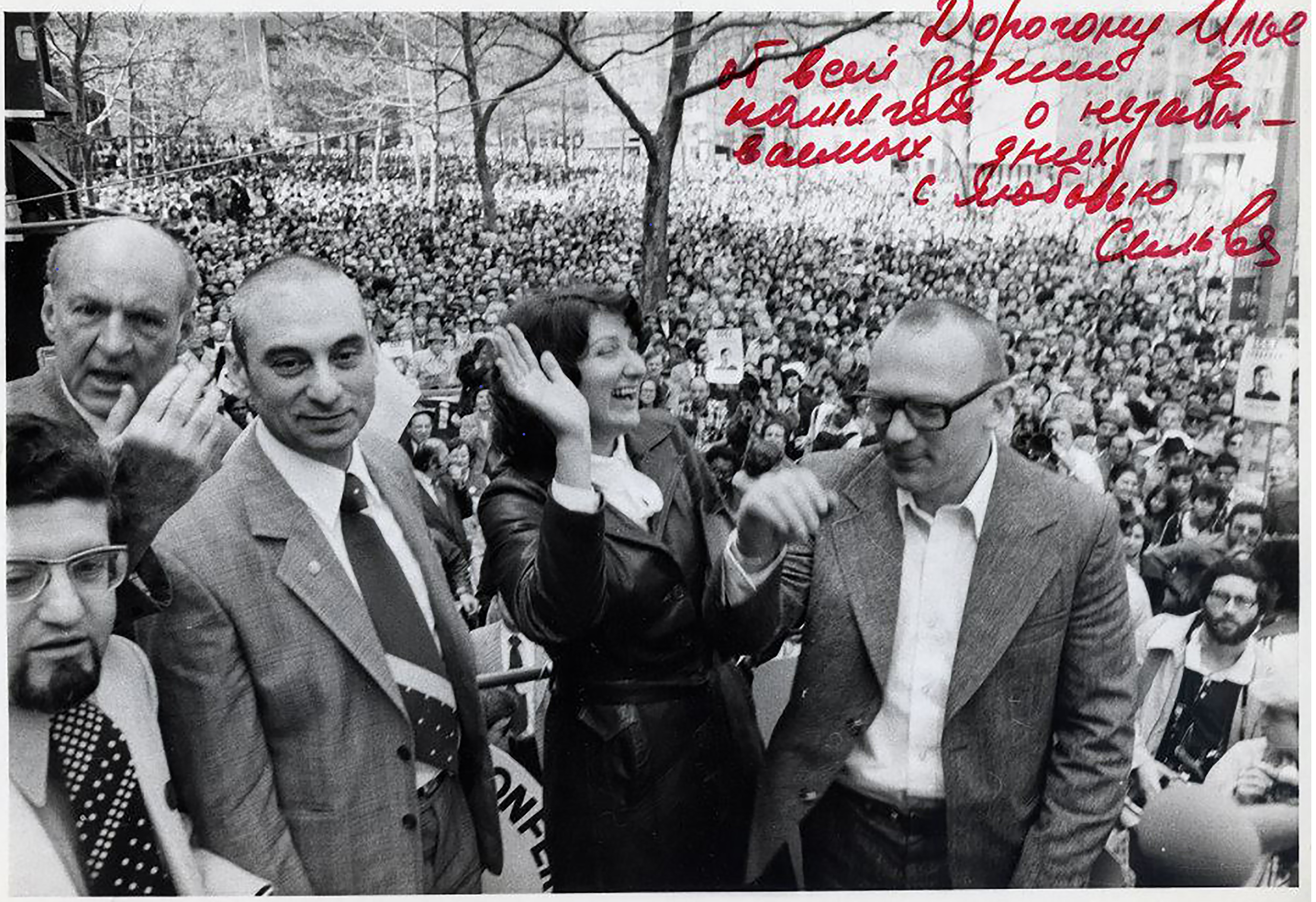
Mark Dymshits, Sylva Zalmanson, Edward Kuznetsov attending a rally with approximately 250,000 supporters in New York City, 1979.

Most of the group, including Sylva's husband and brother were released in April 1979, due to a prisoners exchange with the American government that caught two Soviet spies in New Jersey.

== Today ==
Today, Sylva lives in Israel. She and Edward had a daughter and were divorced two years after his release, in 1981 without a trial. For years, until her retirement in 2005, Sylva worked as a Mechanical Engineer. She started painting in 1992, working in acrylics, oil and mixed media. Sylva became a member of the "Painters and Sculptors Association of Israel" and has exhibited in Israel, the US, UK, Italy, Romania, and Finland.

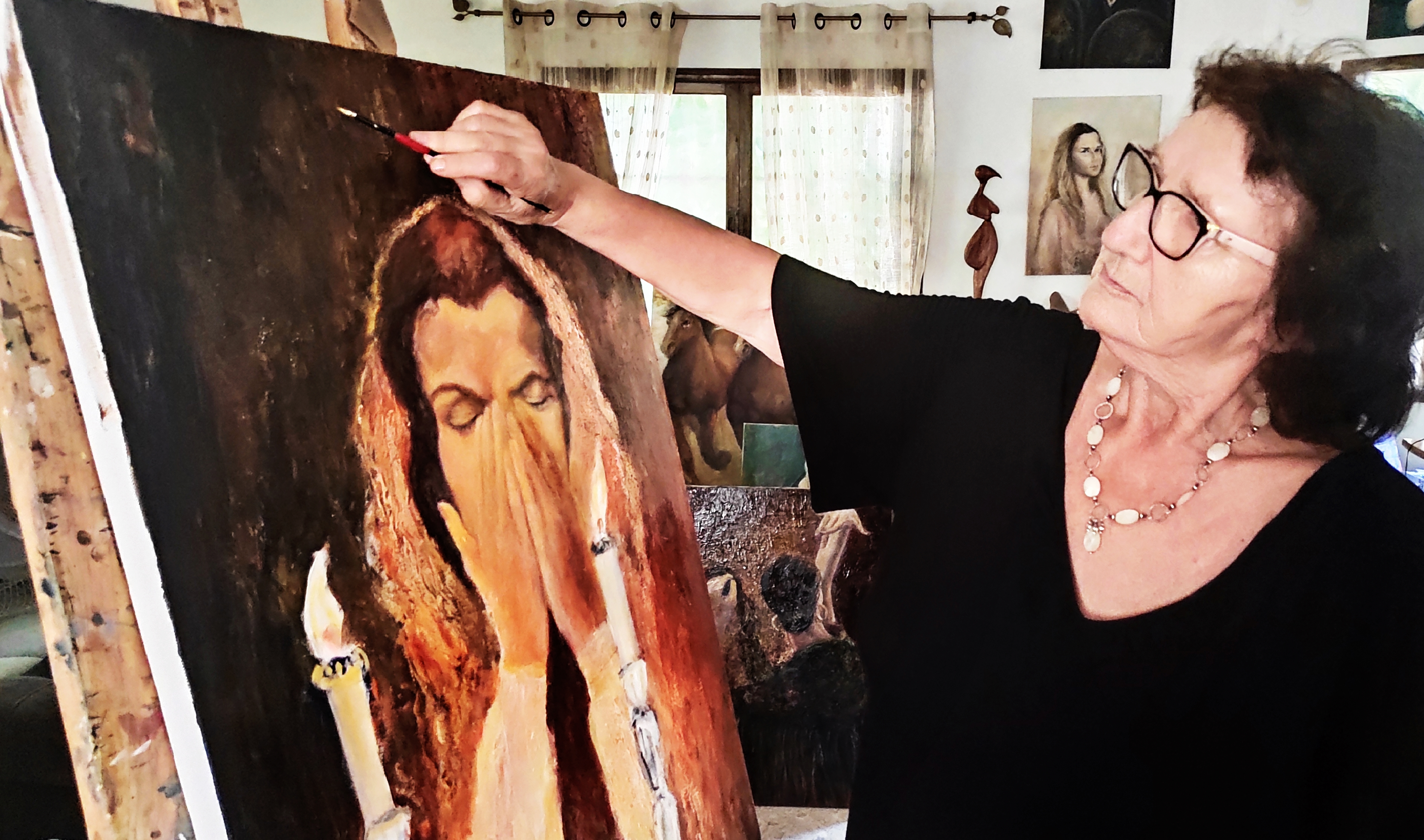
Sylva Zalmanson in her studio in Israel, October 2019.

Sylva and Edward's only daughter, Anat Zalmanson-Kuznetsov, an Israeli Filmmaker, directed a documentary film in 2016 about their story, Operation Wedding.
