= Operation Wedding =

2016 documentary film

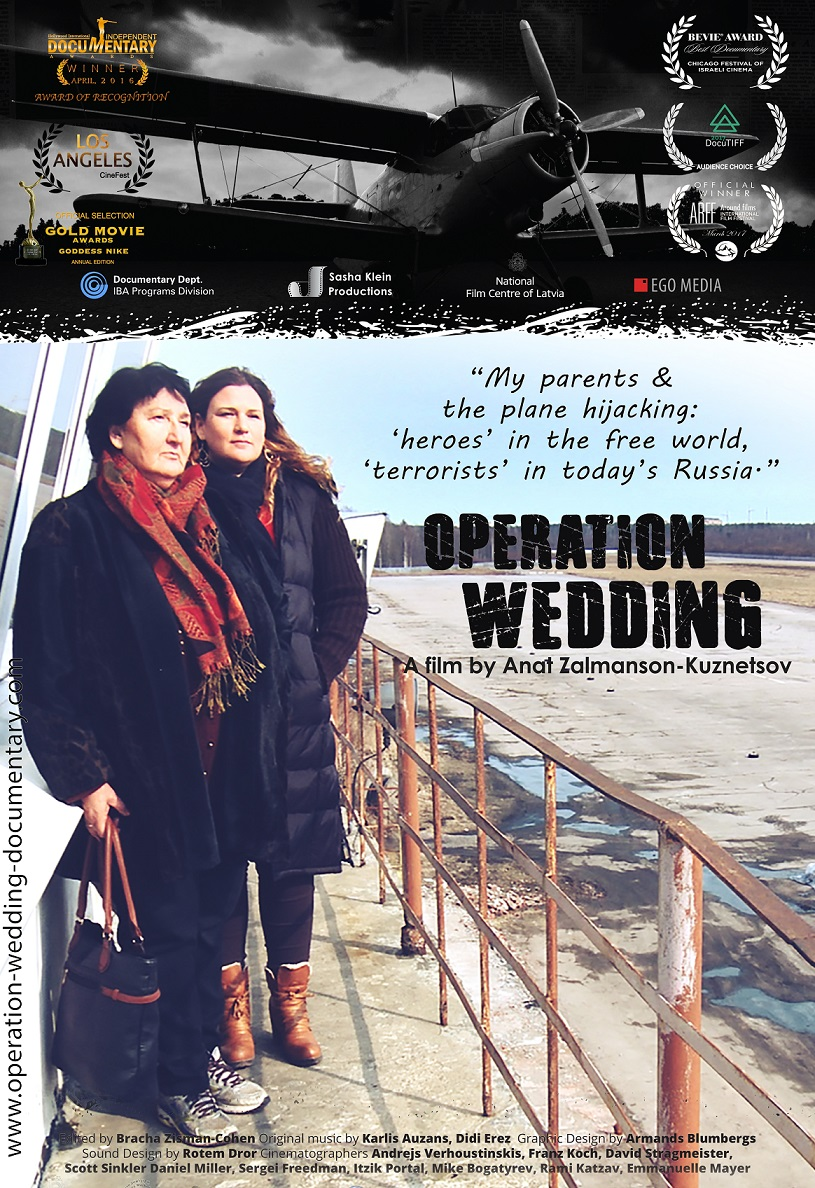
- Official poster of Operation Wedding in English
- Produced by: Sasha Klein Productions (Israel), Ego Media Latvia, Saxsonia Entertainment
- Release date: 2016
- Running time: 58/62 minutes
- Countries: Israel, Latvia
- Languages: English, Russian, Hebrew

Operation Wedding is a documentary film about the Dymshits–Kuznetsov hijacking affair, an unsuccessful escape attempt from the Soviet Union by a group of young Soviet, mostly Jewish, who were denied exit visas. The documentary is told from a personal point of view of the filmmaker, Anat Zalmanson-Kuznetsov, daughter of group members: Eduard Kuznetsov and Sylva Zalmanson.

== Releases ==
- Hebrew version release:

Israel, August 2016 Israel Broadcasting Authority

- English version release:

Russia, US, UK - December 2016 Latvia LTV1 - October 2017 Denmark February 2018 Danish Film Institute (documentary of the Month) Estonia March 2018 ETV2

- Russian dubbing broadcast: Current Time TV September 2017

== Awards ==
- Documentary of the month – Danish Film Institute / Copenhagen, Denmark, February 2018
- Best Documentary, Audience Choice – Chicago Festival of Israeli Cinema / Chicago, US 2017
- Best Feature Documentary – International Filmmaker Festival of NY / New York, NY, US 2018
- Best Writing – History Film Festival / Croatia 2018
- Young Jury award for Best Documentary - The Rasnov Histories and Film Festival / Romania 2018
- Important Documentary About a Socially Relevant Topic, Semi-Final - "Award This" Film Threat / Los Angeles, US 2019
- Opening film - Jewish Film & Culture Festival / Saarbrücken, Germany 2018
- Semi-Finalist - Courage Film Festival / Berlin, Germany 2019
- Award of Excellence - Cinema World Fest Awards Winter / Ottawa, Canada 2018
- Best Feature Film - Ogeechee International History Film Festival / Georgia, US 2018
- Best Documentary - Mindie, Miami Independent Film Festival / Florida, US 2018
- Semi Final – Hollywood Screenings Film Festival / California, US 2018
- Silver award - World Human Rights Awards / Indonesia 2018
- Jury Award for February Best Documentary - Eurasia International Film Festival / Moscow, Russia 2018
- Semi Final – Tribute Film Festival / Texas, US 2018
- Semi Final – Gold Movie Awards / London, UK 2018
- Audience Choice Award - Tirana International Documentary Film Festival / Tirana, Albania 2017
- Globe Award - Around Film Festival / Berlin, Germany 2017
- Merit Award - International Film Festival Spirituality Religion and Visionary / Bali Indonesia 2017
- Opening film - Israel Film Days / Riga, Latvia 2017
- Award of Recognition - Hollywood International Independent Documentary Awards / California, US 2016

== Reviews and articles ==
- Film Review at Film Threat
- BBC Jewish Hijack Plot That Changed The Soviet Union
- New Doc Details 1970 Refusenik-led Escape Attempt to Israel
- ‘Do You Know Your Parents Are Heroes?’ The Story Behind ‘Operation Wedding’
- FILMMAKER DOCUMENTS PARENTS’ ATTEMPT TO ESCAPE USSR
- Israeli filmmaker chronicles parents’ failed attempt to hijack a Soviet plane
- Film Festival Offers Documentaries and Features That Explore Many Different Sides of Israel
- The refusenik plot to fly to freedom
- ‘Operation Wedding’ and the plight of Soviet Jews
