= Mark E. Talisman =

American congressional aide (1941–2019)

- Born: Mark Elliott Talisman; July 16, 1941; Cleveland, Ohio, US
- Died: July 11, 2019 (aged 77); Chevy Chase, Maryland, US
- Education: B.A., European History, Harvard University, 1963; Master's degree, John F. Kennedy School of Government, 1972
- Occupations: Chief Congressional Aide, Humanitarian, Founder, United States Holocaust Memorial Museum
- Years active: 60
- Spouse: Jill Dworkin
- Children: 2

Mark Elliott Talisman (July 16, 1941 – July 11, 2019) was a United States Chief Congressional Aide and Legislative Procedural Expert. As an aide to Ohio Congressman Charles Vanik, he was considered to have played an instrumental role in securing passage of the 1974 Jackson–Vanik amendment, which enabled the right of Soviet Jews to emigrate from the Soviet Union. In 1975 he created the Washington Action Office of the Jewish Federations of North America and served as its director for 18 years. He was also active in Holocaust Survivors affairs, as Founding Vice Chairman of the Holocaust Memorial Council, which later became the United States Holocaust Memorial Museum. President Jimmy Carter appointed him as Vice Chairman, alongside Elie Wiesel, who served as chairman. The Holocaust Museum Memorial Council was wholly responsible for the establishment of the United States Holocaust Memorial Museum, in Washington, DC.

== Early life and education ==
Talisman was born in Cleveland, Ohio, on July 16, 1941. His father operated a gas station and his mother worked as a secretary. The family were members of Temple Emanu-el. Talisman served as president of the International Junior Red Cross when he was 14. He was also a graduate of Cleveland's John Adams High School.

He attended Harvard University on a full scholarship, earning his bachelor's degree in European History in 1963. He completed his master's degree at Harvard's John F. Kennedy School of Government in 1972. In 1971–1972 he was a fellow at the Harvard Institute of Politics, where he created a seminar program for newly elected members of Congress.

== Political career ==
Talisman was appointed as an administrative assistant to Congressman Charles Vanik (22nd congressional district of Ohio) in 1966, becoming the youngest administrative assistant ever appointed to a member of Congress. As Vanik's aide, Talisman is considered to have played an instrumental role in securing passage of the 1974 Jackson–Vanik amendment, the bill that enabled the right of Soviet Jews to emigrate from the Soviet Union. When the bill passed and President Gerald Ford was ready to sign it, Talisman's wife Jill was in labor with the couple's daughter, Jessica, at the Columbia Hospital for Women, located three blocks from the White House. Ford delayed the signing ceremony until the baby was safely delivered, and sent a car to bring Talisman from the hospital to the White House to witness the signing.

During his congressional service, Talisman produced a television series titled Operation Government. In 40 half-hour episodes, the series explored the "history and operations of the federal government and how the three branches of government interact with each other". He was one of the chief organizers of the Bipartisan Congressional Clearinghouse in 1970 that utilized college interns to support Congressional “peace candidates” during the Vietnam war.

In 1975 Talisman left Vanik's office and created the Washington Action Office of the Jewish Federations of North America. He served as its director for the next 18 years.

In the late 1970s, Talisman served on the presidential commission that recommended creation of a national memorial to the Holocaust. In 1980 he was appointed by President Jimmy Carter to serve as vice chairman of the Holocaust Memorial Museum Council, under chairman Elie Wiesel. After the United States Holocaust Memorial Museum opened, Talisman served on its Committee on Conscience, which oversees genocide-prevention efforts.

== Project Judaica Foundation ==
In 1983, Jill and Mark Talisman created the Project Judaica Foundation, a nonprofit organization with the mission of rescuing and exhibiting historic or endangered Jewish artifacts. The Foundation was instrumental in bringing The Precious Legacy exhibition to the United States in 1983. The Foundation collaborated with the Library of Congress to produce the 1987 touring exhibition From the Ends of the Earth: Judaic Treasures of the Library of Congress in commemoration of the 75th anniversary of the creation of the Library's Hebraic collection. The Foundation was also instrumental in arranging for the Vatican Library to display the Dead Sea Scrolls in 1994; this was the first official Israeli exhibit to be shown at the Vatican. The Foundation has worked with the Center for Jewish Art at Hebrew University to sponsor the work of curators and scholars recovering and preserving surviving but neglected Jewish art, artifacts, and buildings in Poland.

== Other activities ==
In the late 20th century, Talisman worked as a consultant for emerging democratic countries. He advised Corazon Aquino on the development of the Philippines constitution during the 1986 Yellow Revolution, and was an advisor to Václav Havel on the creation of Czechoslovakia's constitution. He also assisted the Hopi Indians with funding a hospital on their reservation.

In 2000 he advised on the founding of Holocaust Survivors Foundation USA, a national coalition of Holocaust survivors and survivor groups.

== Personal life ==
Talisman married Jill Leslie Dworkin in May 1972. The couple had a son and daughter. Talisman's hobbies included photography, sculpting, cooking, and gardening. The vegetable garden in the family's Chevy Chase, Maryland, property, where Talisman spent many hours every week during the growing season, was locally famous.

Talisman died at his home in Chevy Chase on July 11, 2019, aged 77.
