= Faceboyz Folliez =

Faceboyz Folliez is a variety show presented the first Sunday of each month at the Bowery Poetry Club in New York City's Lower East Side. The show usually combines a variety of acts including readings by numerous published authors, burlesque performers, live music, underground movies and an audience participation segment. Produced and hosted by actor and performer Faceboy, which the show is named after, it features a core cast consisting of Rev. Jen Miller, Velocity Chyaldd, Stormy Leather, Amanda Whip and Paaje Flash. The event is notable as well for the original short films produced by ASS Studios, a production company Faceboy is directly affiliated with, which are all directed by underground filmmaker Courtney Fathom Sell.

Inspired by the famed Folies Bergère of Paris, the cast of Faceboyz Folliez present a show that is usually as daring as the Folies Bergère was considered to be in its time. Past guests have included; Jonathan Ames, John S. Hall Joey Gay and Zoe Hansen.

Regarding the show, Faceboy stated in an interview: “Folliez is a variety show of the weird and wonderful, with an emphasis on bawdy humor… daring burlesque, live music, creepy films, great writers and crazy fun!”
