= Folies Bergère =

Music hall and theatre in Paris, France

- The entrance in 2013, after renovations

- Location within Paris
- Address: 32 Rue Richer; Paris; France
- Coordinates: 48.8742°N 2.3449°E
- Designation: Cabaret music hall

Construction
- Opened: 2 May 1869
- Architect: Plumeret

Website
- Foliesbergere.com

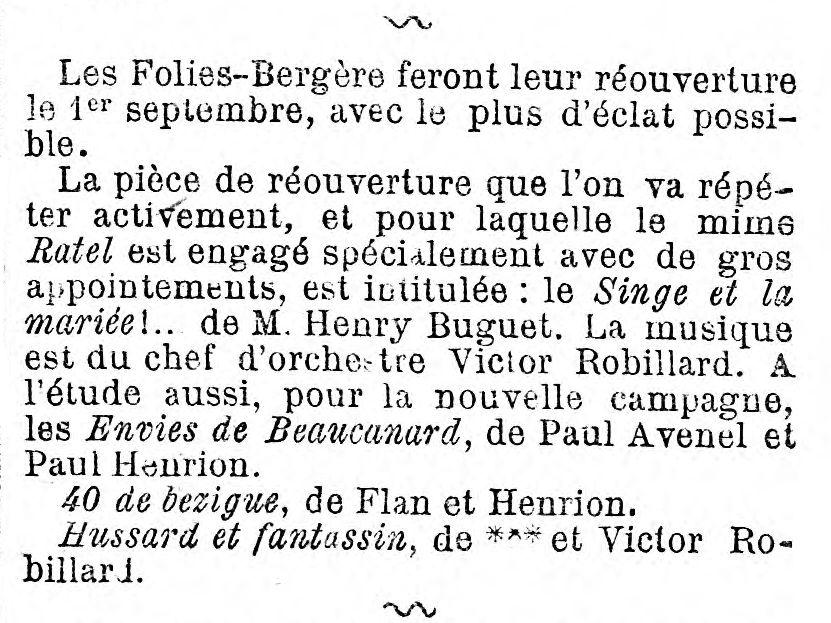
A notice referencing the Folies-Bergère in Le Gaulois, 3 August 1869

The Folies Bergère (French pronunciation: [fɔli bɛʁʒɛʁ]) is a cabaret music hall in Paris, France. Located at 32 Rue Richer in the 9th Arrondissement, the Folies Bergère was built as an opera house by the architect Plumeret. It opened on 2 May 1869 as the Folies Trévise, with light entertainment including operettas, comic opera, popular songs, and gymnastics. It became the Folies Bergère on 13 September 1872, named after nearby Rue Bergère. The house was at the height of its fame and popularity from the 1890s' Belle Époque through the 1920s.

Revues featured extravagant costumes, sets and effects, and often nude women. In 1926, Josephine Baker, an African-American expatriate singer, dancer and entertainer, caused a sensation at the Folies Bergère by dancing in a costume consisting of jewelry and a "bikini bottom" with rubber bananas attached.

The institution is still in business, and is still a strong symbol of French and Parisian life. The métro stations are Cadet and Grands Boulevards.

== History ==
The Folies Bergère, located at 32 Rue Richer in the 9th Arrondissement of Paris, was opened on 2 May 1869 under the name Folies Trévise as an opera house patterned after the Alhambra music hall in London by architect Plumeret, who was a building inspector of the French crown.

The term "folies" refers to pleasure houses, vacation homes built from the end of the 18th century near large cities to discreetly shelter the adulterous loves of the bourgeoisie and aristocrats.

When starting out as the Folies Trévise, it included light entertainment such as operettas, opéra comique (comic opera), popular songs and gymnastics. The original name derived from the street of that name by the stage door. However, the Duc de Trévise objected.

On 13 September 1872, it became the Folies Bergère, named after a nearby street, Rue Bergère ("bergère" means "shepherdess").

In 1882, Édouard Manet painted his well-known painting A Bar at the Folies-Bergère which depicts a bar-girl, one of the demimondaines, standing before a mirror. One of the many details in the painting is the feet of a trapeze artist who is performing above the customers.

In 1886, Édouard Marchand conceived a new genre of entertainment for the Folies Bergère: the music-hall revue. Women would be the heart of Marchand's concept for the Folies. In 30 November 1886, the Folies Bergère, staged the first revue-style music hall show Place au jeûne !, featuring Alice Berthier and scantily clad chorus girls, was a tremendous success.

In the early 1890s, the American dancer Loie Fuller starred at the Folies Bergère. In 1902, illness forced Marchand to leave after 16 years.

In 1907, at the age of 13, Yvonne Printemps was dancing at the Folies Bergère.

Historical photographs of the Folies Bergère

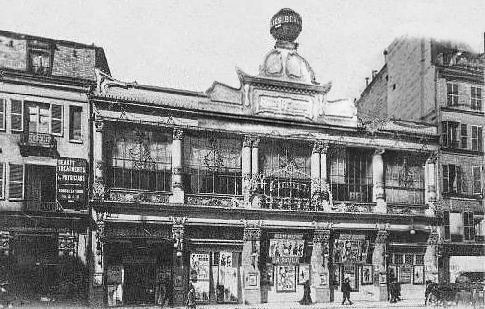
Folies Bergère, 1872

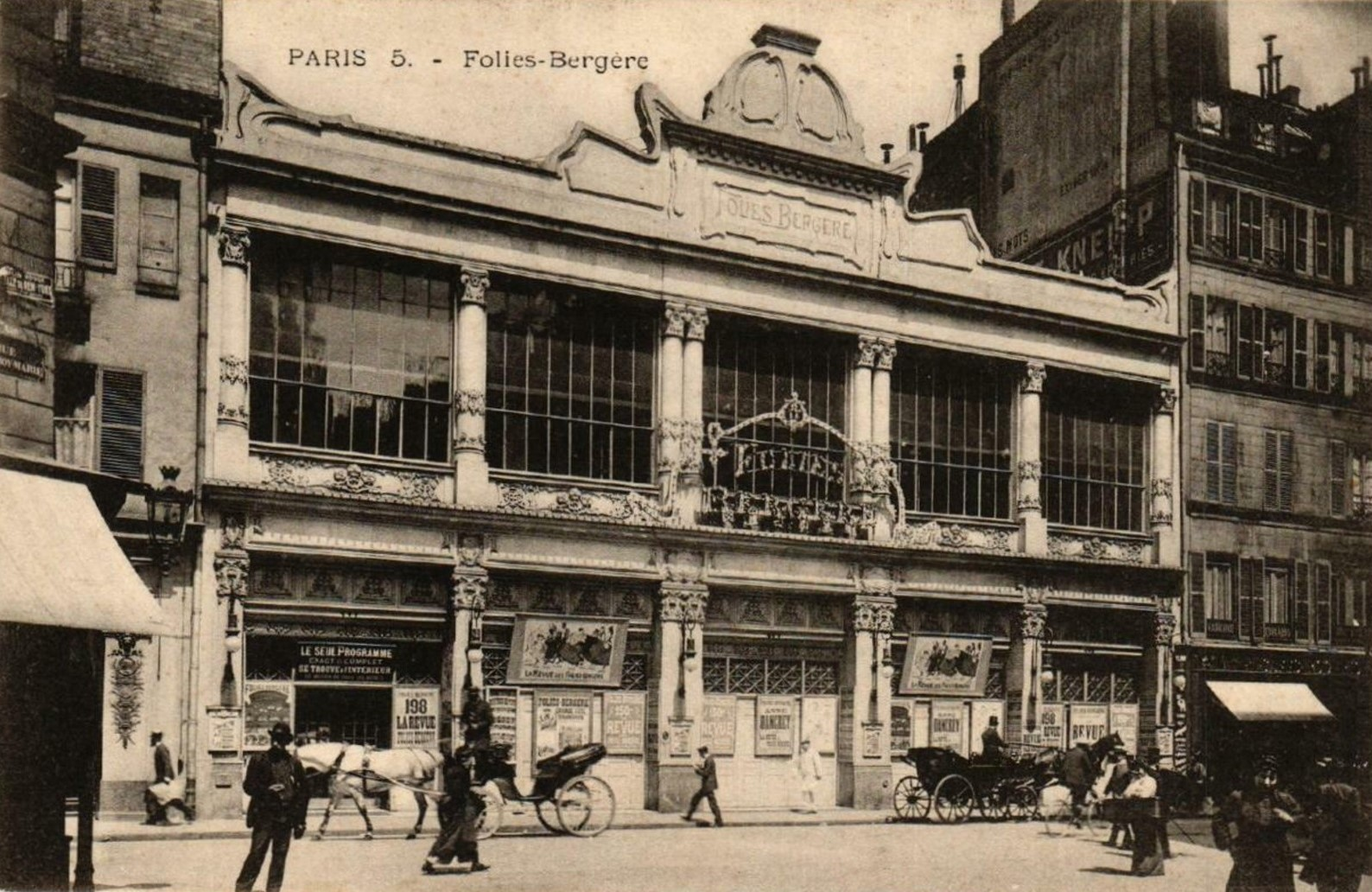
Folies Bergère, 1900

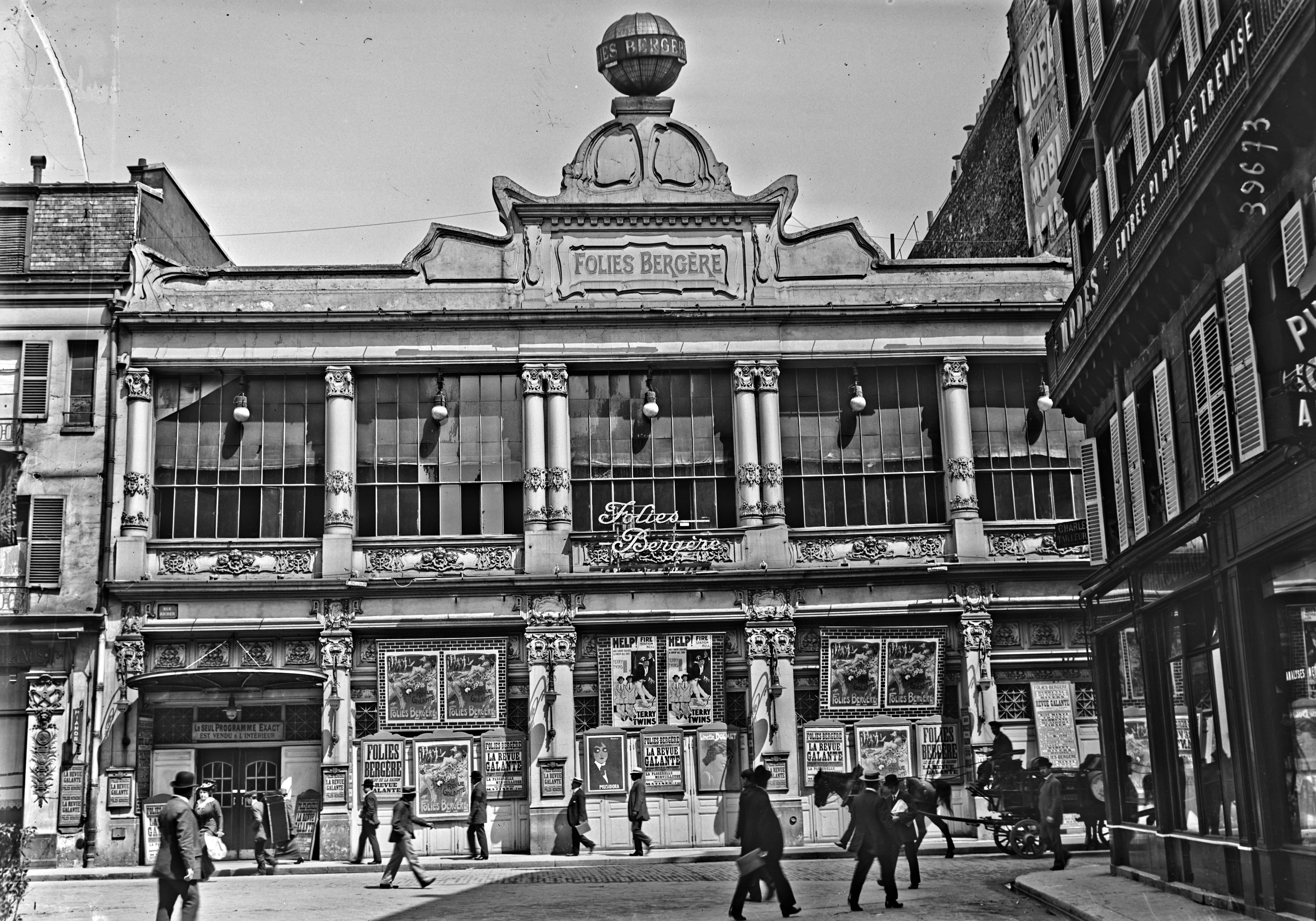
Folies Bergère, 1914. A poster for the actress Musidora is on the wall

In 1918, Paul Derval (1880–1966) made his mark on the revue. His revues featured extravagant costumes, sets and effects, and "small nude women". Derval's small nude women would become the hallmark of the Folies. During his 48 years at the Folies, he launched the careers of many French stars including Maurice Chevalier, Mistinguett, Josephine Baker, Fernandel and many others.

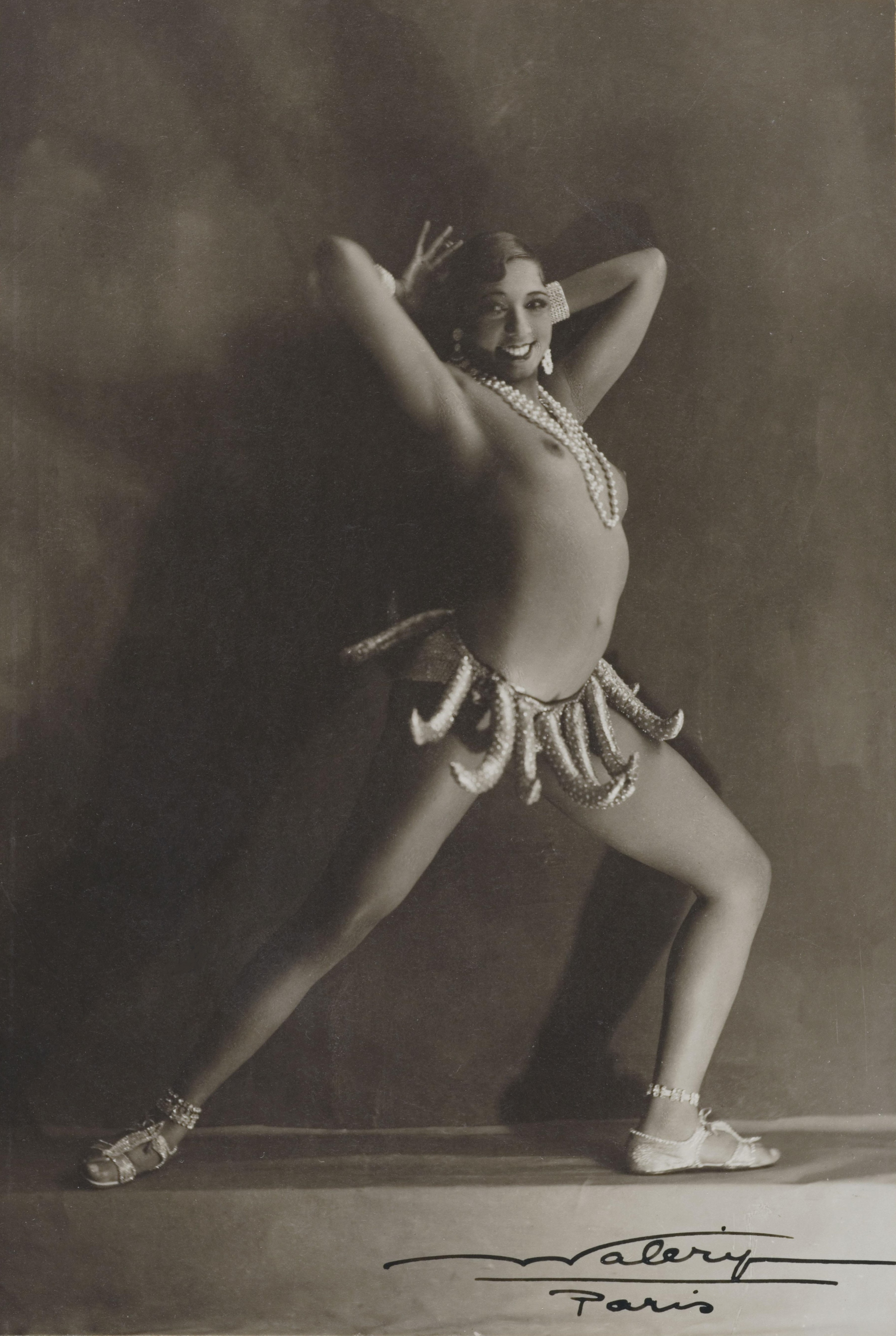
Josephine Baker in jewelry and a "bikini bottom" with rubber bananas attached, from the Folies Bergère production Un Vent de Folie, by Walery, 1927

In 1926, Baker, an African-American expatriate singer, dancer, and entertainer, caused a sensation at the Folies Bergère in a new revue, La Folie du jour, in which she danced a number Fatou wearing a costume consisting of a skirt made of a string of artificial bananas and little else, and Un Vent De Folie(1927). Her erotic dancing and near-nude performances were renowned. The Folies Bergère catered to popular taste. Shows featured elaborate costumes; the women's were frequently revealing, practically leaving them naked, and shows often contained a good deal of nudity. Shows also played up the "exoticness" of people and objects from other cultures, indulging the Parisian fascination with the négritude of the 1920s.

In 1926 the facade of the theatre was given a complete make-over by the artist Maurice Pico. The facade was redone in Art Deco style, one of the many Parisian theatres of this period using the style.

Nulls de Folies being followed by Folies en Folie and then En Super-Folies

In 1931, in the revue L'usine à folies, Malian dancer Melka Soudani starred with Senegalese dancer Féral Benga in the act Sur le plateau de la négresse.

In 1936, Josephine Baker returned from New York City and Derval signed her to lead the revue En Super Folies.

In 1937, Margaret Kelly hired Constance Tomkinson.

Michel Gyarmathy, a Hungarian from Balassagyarmat, designed the poster for En Super Folies and lasted 56 years at the Folies Bergère.

The funeral of Paul Derval was held on 20 May 1966. He was 86 and had reigned supreme over the most celebrated music hall in the world. His wife Antonia Derval, supported by Michel Gyarmathy, succeeded him. In August 1974, Antonia Derval passed on the direction of the business to Hélène Martini, the empress of the night (25 years earlier she had been a showgirl in the revues).

Since 2006, the Folies Bergère has presented some musical productions with Stage Entertainment like Cabaret (2006–2008) or Zorro (2009–2010).

== Filmography ==
- 1927: La Folie du jour, in which Josephine Baker dances the Charleston
- 1935: Folies Bergère de Paris directed by Roy Del Ruth, with Maurice Chevalier, Merle Oberon, and Ann Sothern
- 1935: Folies Bergère de Paris directed by Marcel Achard with Maurice Chevalier, Natalie Paley, Fernand Ledoux. A French-language version of the 1935 Hollywood film.
- 1937: En Super Folies - via: archive.org

Mr. Paul Derval, Directeur des "Folies Bergére" passe commande a Mr. (Maurice) Hermite de la Grande Revue "EN SUPER FOLIES"
Mr. Paul Derval, Director of the "Folies Bergére," commissions Mr. (Maurice) Hermite to produce the Grand Revue "EN SUPER FOLIES"

with Josephine Baker and the Bluebell Girls

- 1956: Folies-Bergère directed by Henri Decoin with Eddie Constantine, Zizi Jeanmaire, Yves Robert, Pierre Mondy
- 1959: Énigme aux Folies Bergère directed by Jean Mitry with Dora Doll, Claude Godard
- 1991: La Totale! directed by Claude Zidi with Thierry Lhermitte
- 2026: Young Sherlock directed by Dennie Gordon with Hero Fiennes Tiffin, Dónal Finn, Max Irons

== Similar venues ==
The Folies Bergère inspired the Ziegfeld Follies in the United States and other similar shows, including the Teatro Follies in Mexico and a long-standing revue, The Las Vegas Folies Bergere, at the Tropicana Resort & Casino in Las Vegas, which opened in 1959, closed at the end of March 2009 after nearly 50 years in operation.

In the 1930s and '40s the impresario Clifford C. Fischer staged several Folies Bergere productions in the United States. These included the Folies Bergère of 1939 at the Broadway Theater in New York and the Folies Bergère of 1944 at the Winterland Ballroom in San Francisco.

A recent example is Faceboyz Folliez, a monthly burlesque and variety show at the Bowery Poetry Club in New York City.

== Images ==
Folies Bergere posters

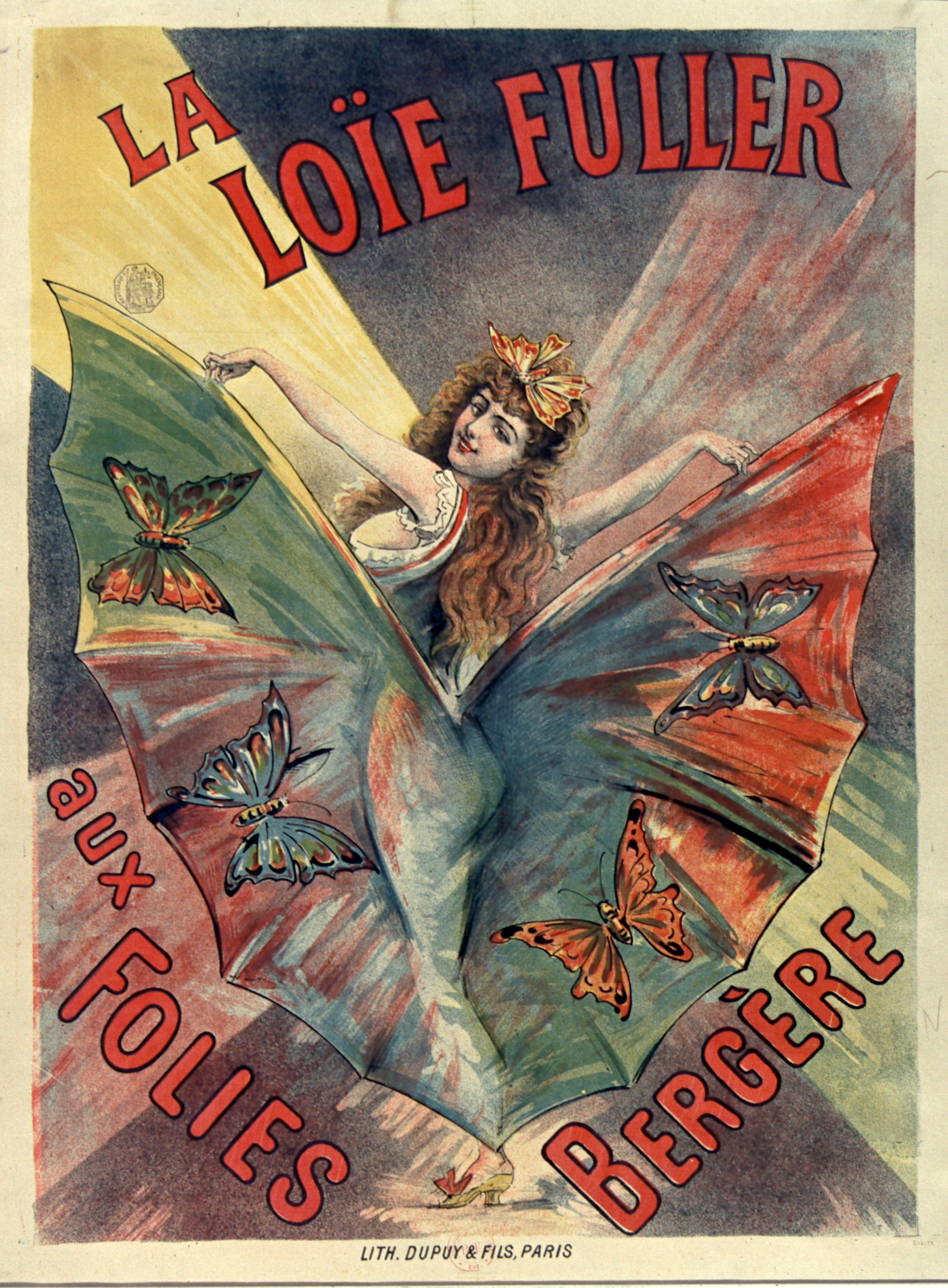
Loïe Fuller poster by Henri de Toulouse-Lautrec (circa 1895)

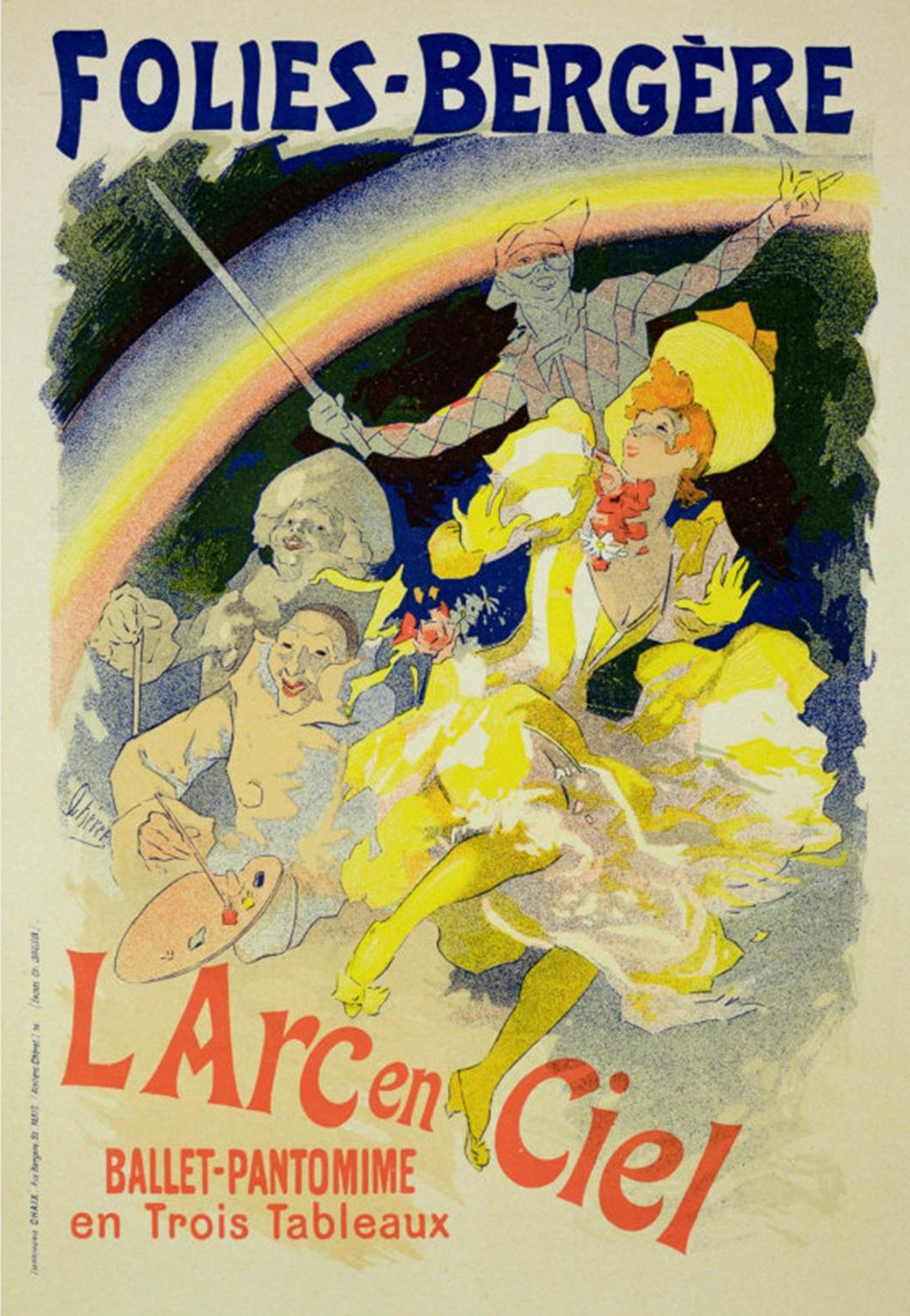
The Rainbow production poster by Jules Chéret, (circa 1896)

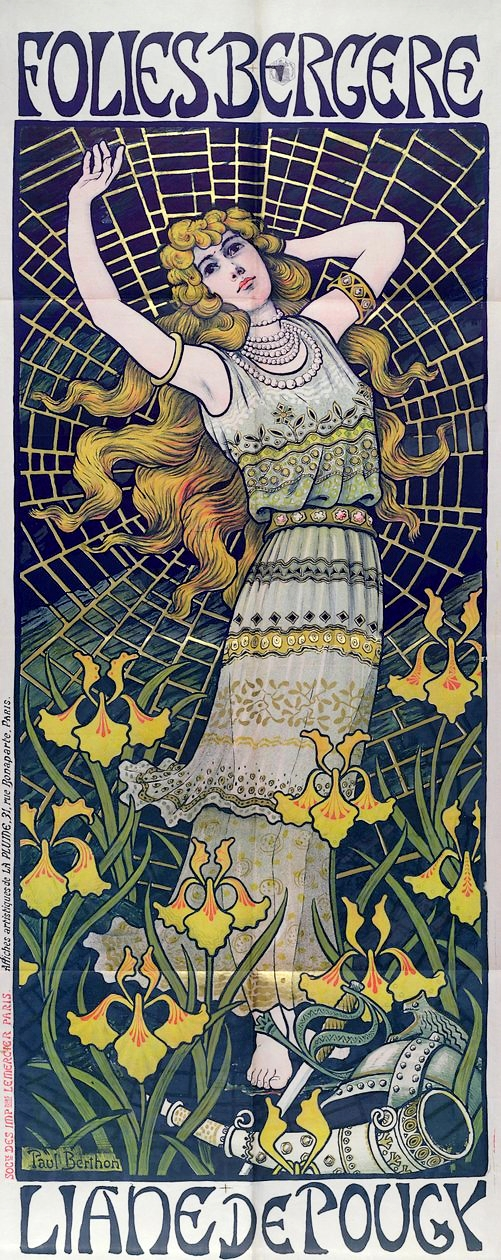
Liane de Pougy poster by Paul Berthon, (circa 1896).

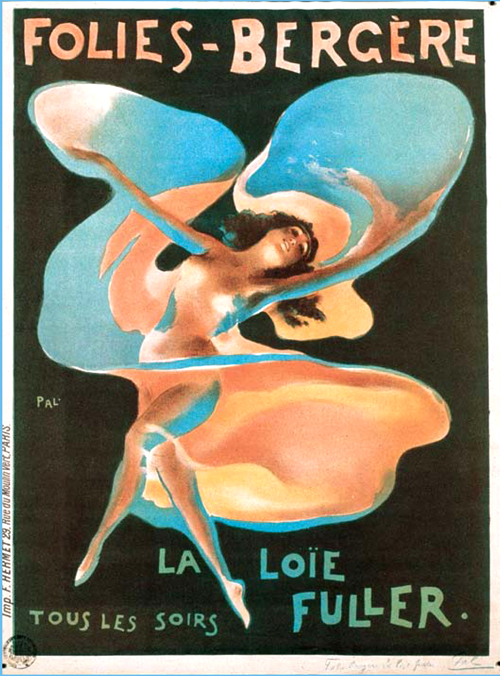
Loïe Fuller poster by PAL (circa 1895)

Loïe Fuller poster by PAL, 1897

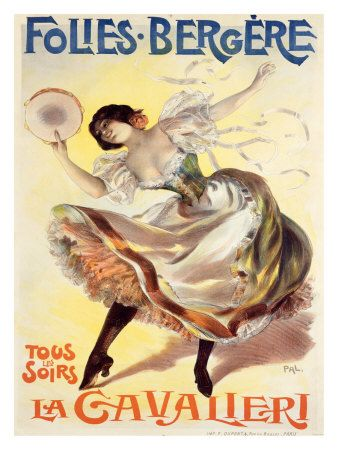
Lina Cavalieri poster by PAL, 1897

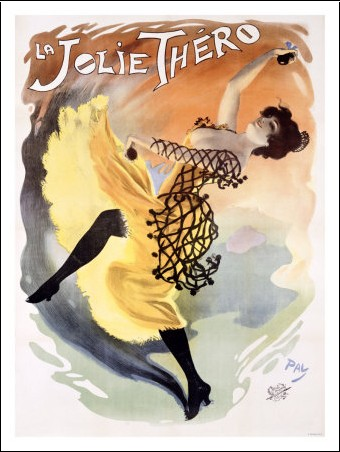
La Jolie Théro production poster by PAL, 1898

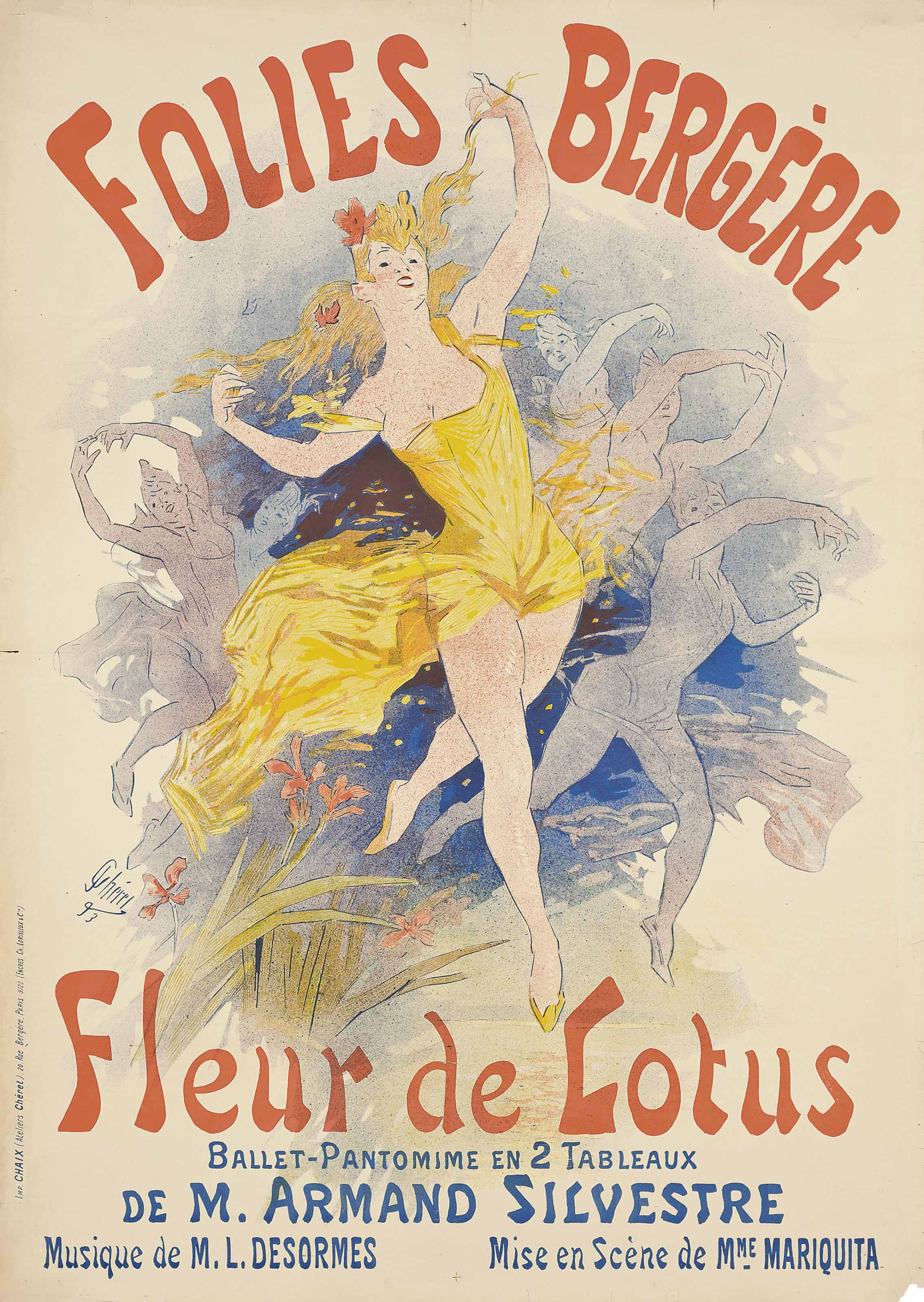
Jules Chéret, Folies Bergère, Fleur de Lotus, 1893 Art Nouveau poster for the Ballet Pantomime
The Folies Bergere in art

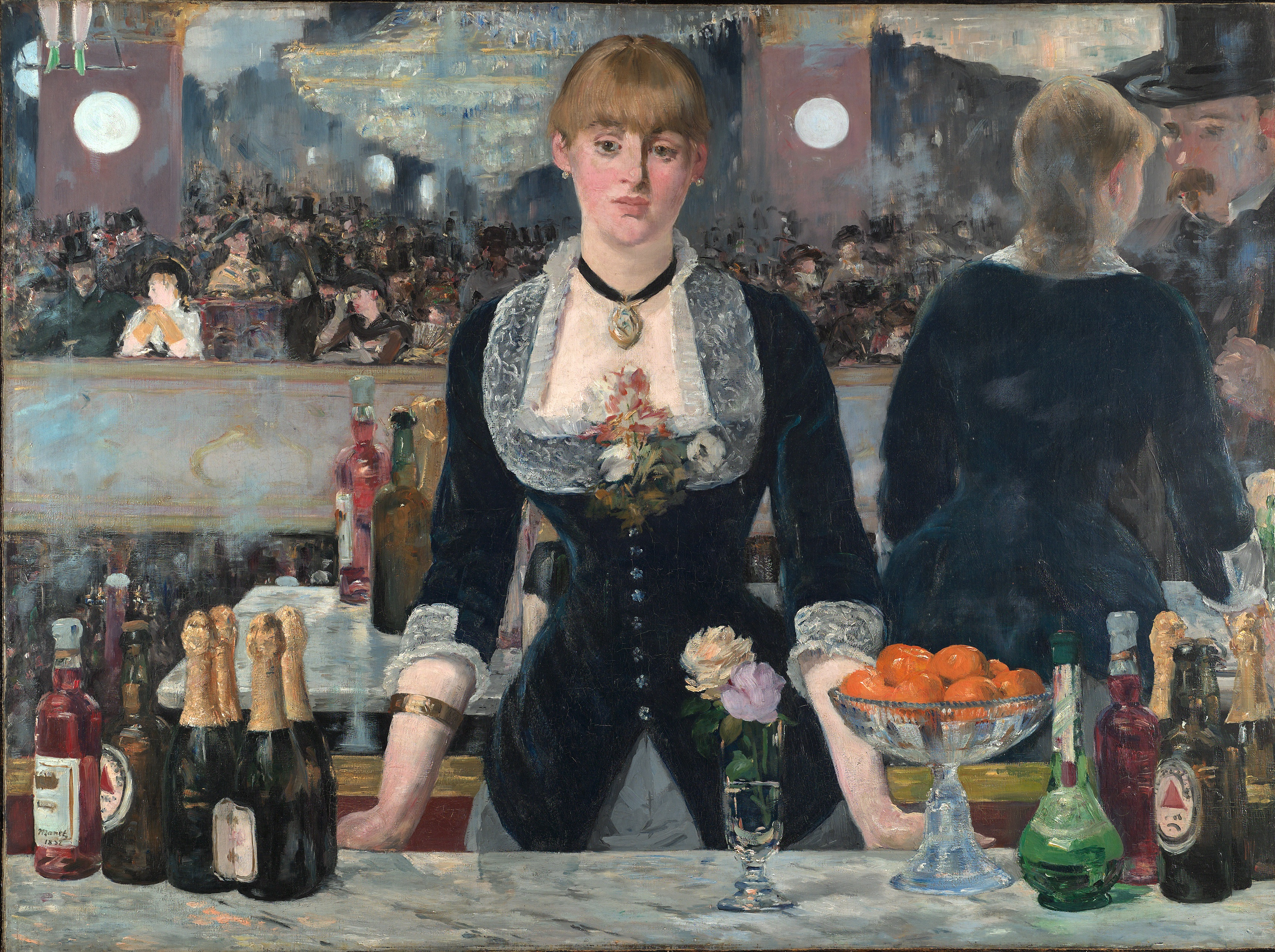
Édouard Manet's A Bar at the Folies-Bergère, 1882

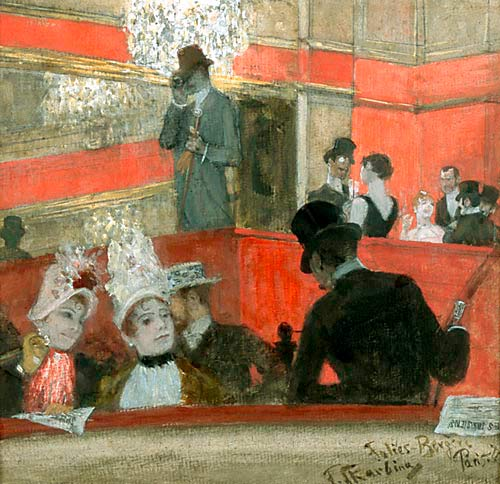
Folies Bergère, by Franz Skarbina
Folies Bergere building

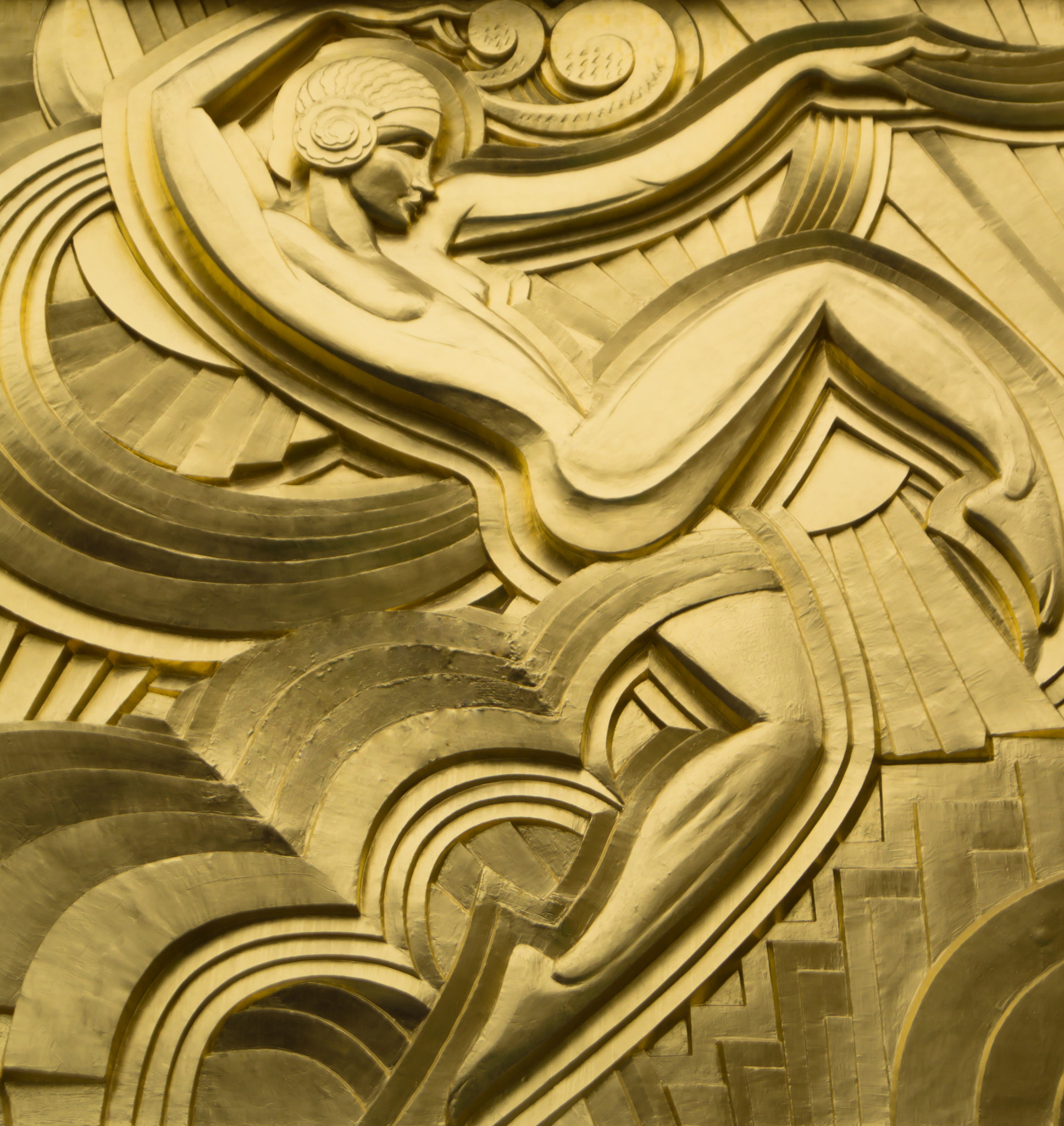
Art Deco relief in façade

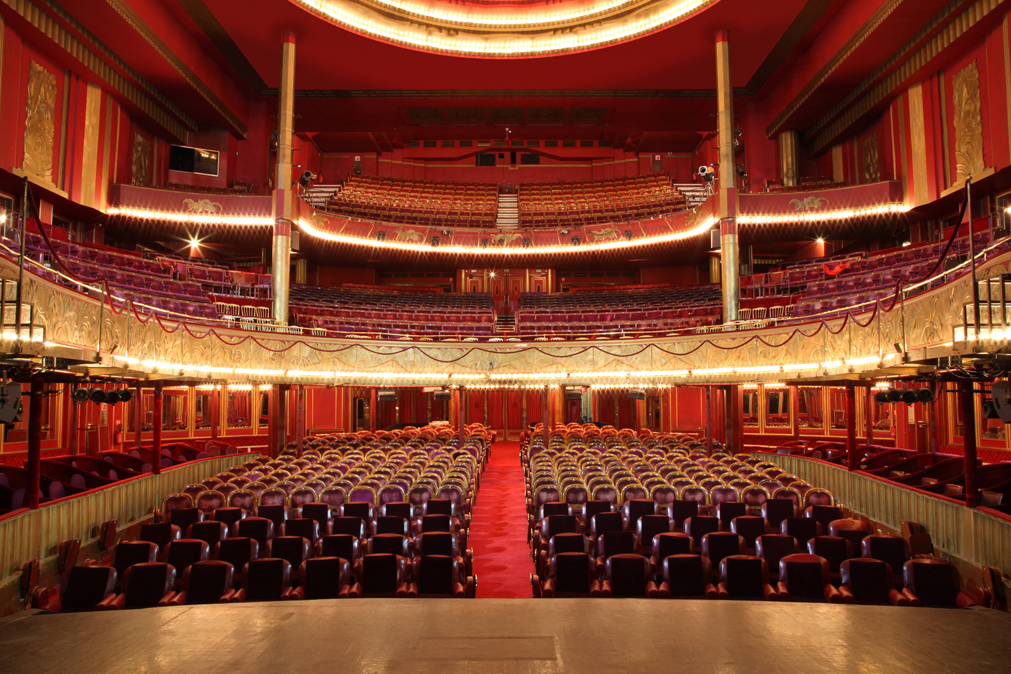
The auditorium

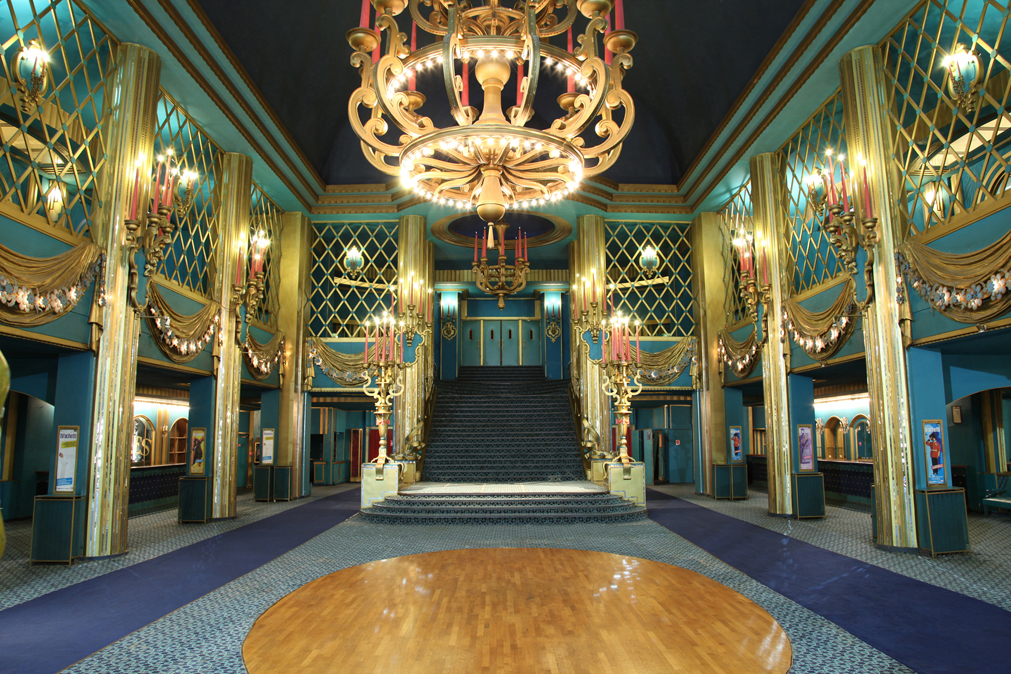
The foyer

Theatre interior
Folies Bergere performers

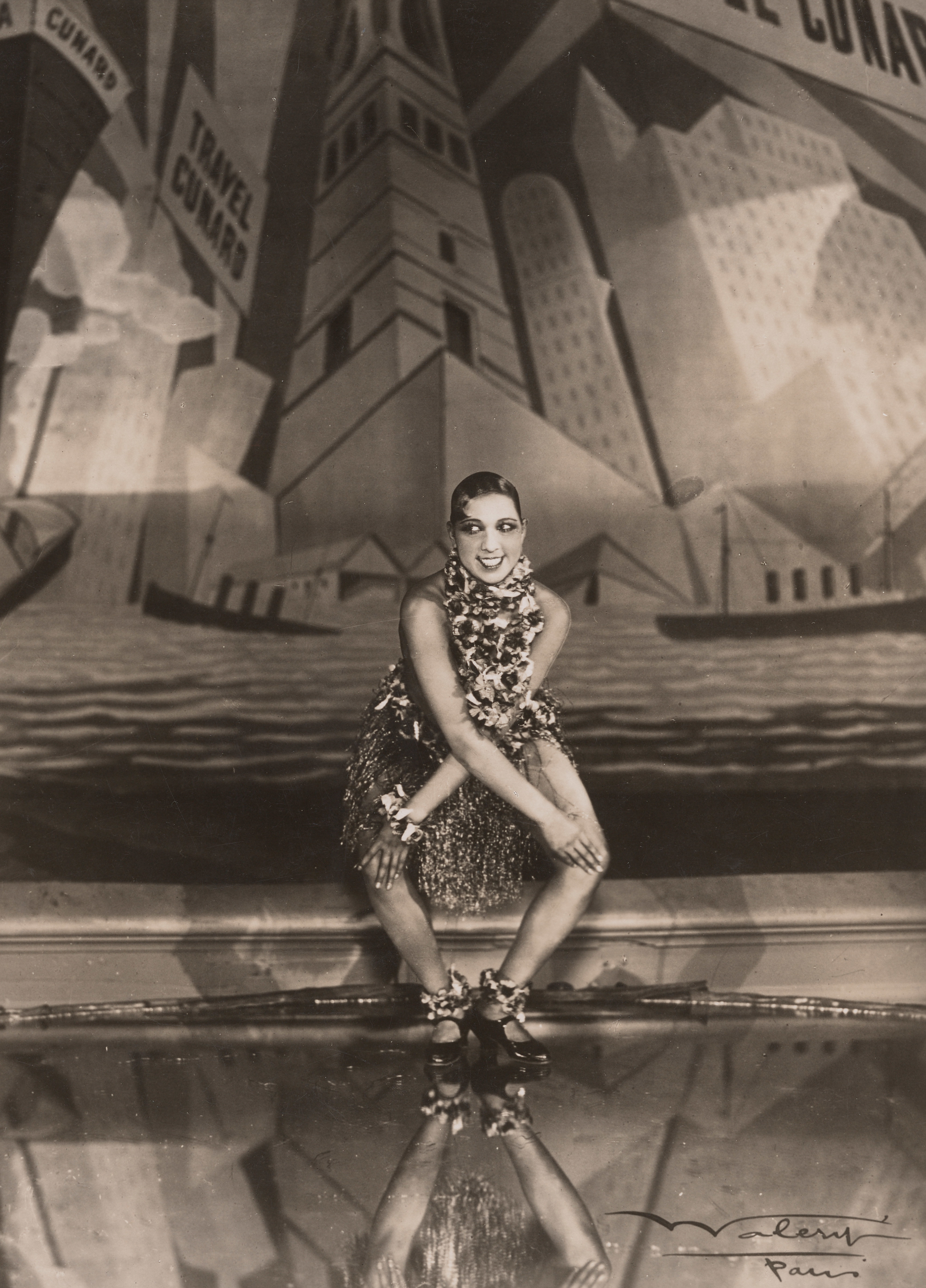
Josephine Baker dancing the Charleston for the silent film La Folie du jour (1927)

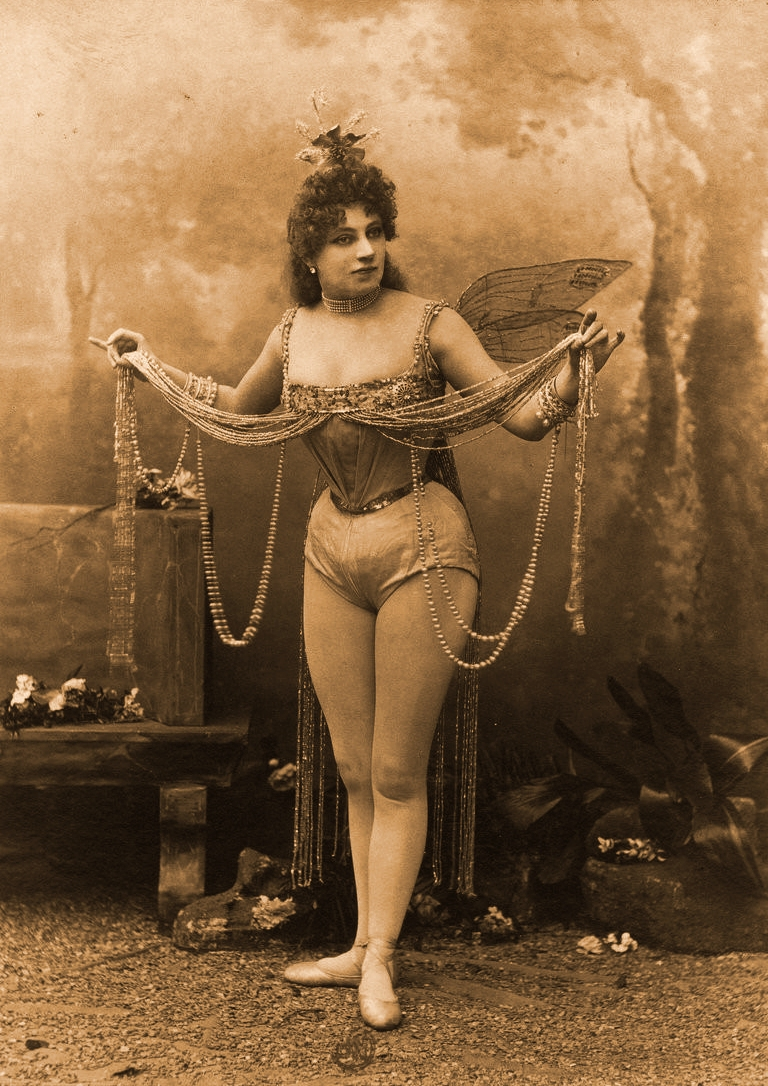
Mercedes, Folies Bergère, 1895

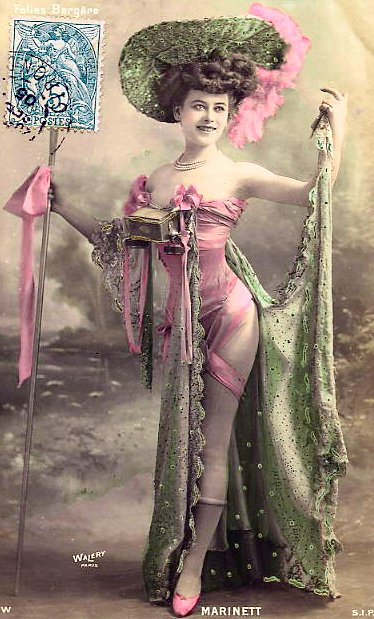
Marinett, Folies Bergère, by Walery, c. 1900

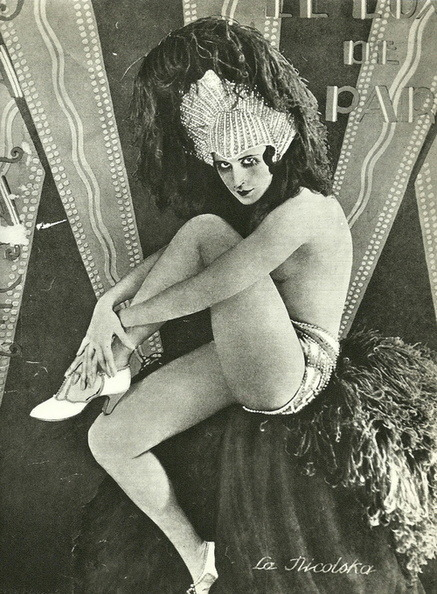
Lila Nikolska, La Nikolska, from the Folies Bergère production La grande folie, 1928

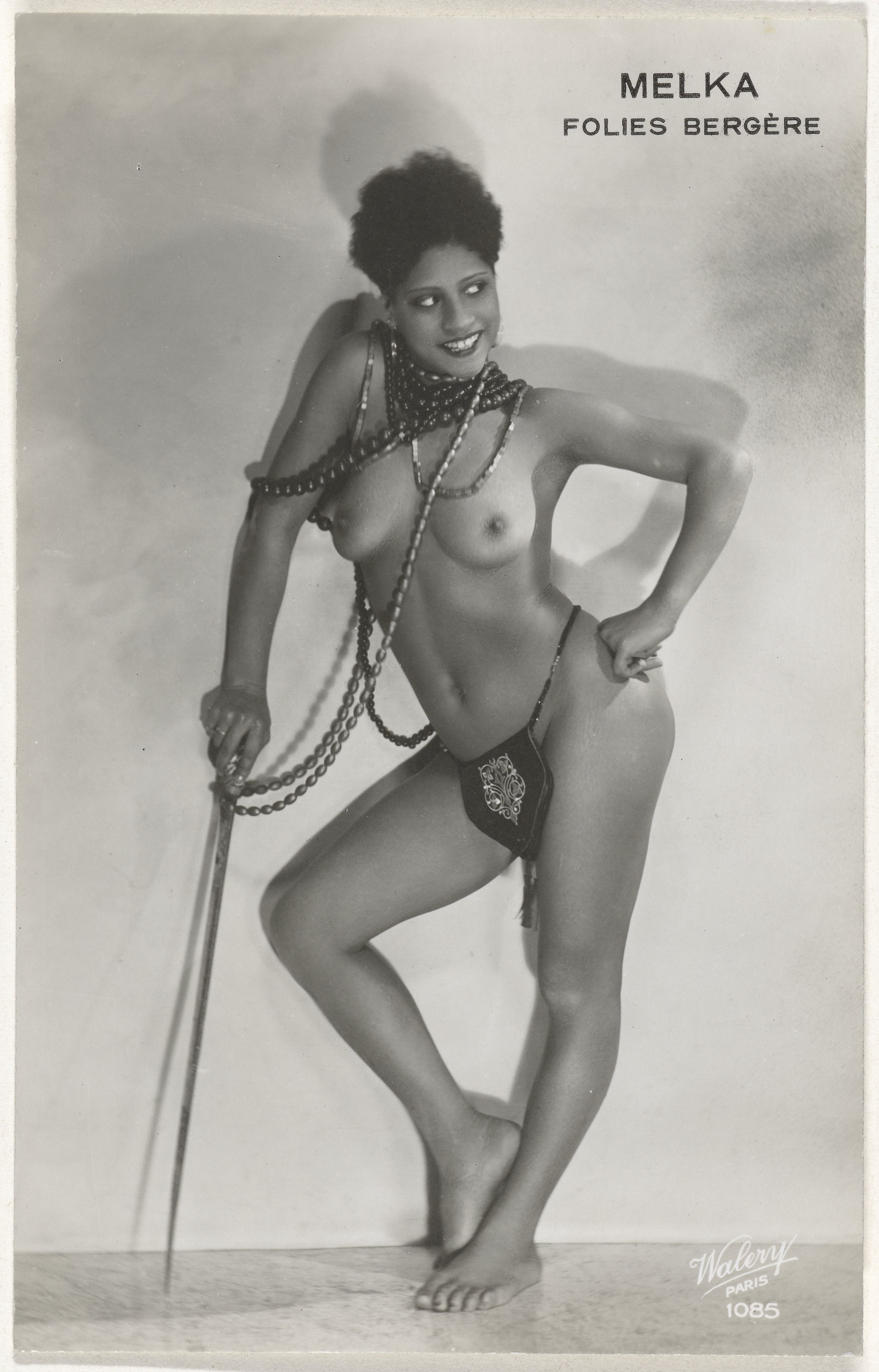
Melka Soudani, by Walery

== See also ==
- Showgirl

Venues:

- Casino de Paris, Paris
- Crazy Horse (cabaret), Paris
- Folies Bergere at The Tropicana Hotel Las Vegas
- Le Lido, Paris
- Minsky's Burlesque
- Moulin Rouge, Paris
- Paradis Latin, Paris
- Teatro Blanquita, Mexico City
- Teatro Follies Bergere, Mexico City
- Teatro Tívoli (Mexico City), Mexico City
- Tropicana Club, Havana

Theatre groups:

- Cabaret Red Light

Shows:

- Absinthe – a Las Vegas show
- Jubilee! – a revue show in Las Vegas
- Peepshow – a burlesque show in Nevada
- Sirens of TI – a Las Vegas casino show
