= Jacki Clérico =

French businessman

Jacki Clérico (March 18, 1929 – January 13, 2013) was a French businessman who owned the Moulin Rouge cabaret of Paris from 1962 until his death in 2013. Clérico is credited with reviving the popularity of the Moulin Rouge over the course of fifty years.

Clérico was born in Paris, France, on March 18, 1929. In 1928, his father, Joseph Clérico, a glassmaker, had moved to Paris from the Piedmont region with his brother, Louis Clérico. The brothers had opened a Parisian glass shop. Joseph and Louis made much of their family's fortune during the German occupation of Paris during World War II, when there was a shortage of glassmakers in the city. The Cléricos were hired to make glass for cities throughout France and Germany which had suffered bombing damage. They had both acquired considerable wealth through their repairs by the end of the war.

The brothers purchased the Le Lido cabaret on the Champs-Élysées in 1946. In 1955, Joseph and Louis purchased the Moulin Rouge. They upgraded the kitchens and marketed the venue as a tourist destination. Still, the Moulin Rouge continued to suffer from financial distress by the early 1960s.

Jacki Clérico took over the Moulin Rouge in 1962 from his father, Joseph. Clérico built a new aquarium for performances, expanded the auditorium, and introduced professional theater backdrops and scenery. His first revue, "Frou-Frou," opened to sold out audiences in 1963. From that point on, Jacki Clérico only opened revues beginning with the letter "F" in keeping with a superstition that the letter brought luck beginning with "Frou-Frou". His other revues, included Frisson (1965), Fascination (1967), Fantastic (1970), Festival (1973), Follement (1976), Frénésie (1979), Femmes, Femmes, Femmes... (1983), followed this tradition. The music of these revues was composed by Henri Betti.

In 1989, Clerico opened "Formidable" to mark the 100th anniversary of the Moulin Rouge. Guests included Prince Edward, Earl of Wessex.

The Moulin Rouge began to lose popularity again during the 1990s. Clérico continued to produce the Moulin Rouge's trademark revues, but the cabaret nearly went bankrupt in 1997. The last show that Clérico produced was "Féerie" in 1999, which featured one hundred dancers. The release of Baz Luhrmann's Moulin Rouge! in 2001, which starred Nicole Kidman, Ewan McGregor, and Jim Broadbent, revived the club's popularity. The Moulin Rouge is now marketed as a family-oriented destination.

Jacki Clérico turned over the day-to-day operations of the Moulin Rouge to his son, Jean-Jacques Clérico, during his later years. He served as the Chairman of the Supervisory Board of the Moulin Rouge until shortly before his death. Clérico died on January 13, 2013, at the age of 83.
