= Art Star Scene Studios =

American film studio

ASS Studios
- Industry: Movie studio
- Founded: April 1, 2011
- Founders: Courtney Fathom Sell; Reverend Jen Miller
- Defunct: 2014
- Headquarters: United States
- Key people: Producer: Jonathan Ames, notable cast members: Janeane Garofalo, Francis Hall as Faceboy, Robert Prichard, Rachel Trachtenberg
- Products: Motion pictures

Art Star Scene Studios or ASS Studios as it is commonly referred to as, is an American independent Motion Picture Studio founded by Courtney Fathom Sell & Reverend Jen Miller in 2011.

== History ==
The studio, which Sell and Miller claim was launched off of money won on scratch tickets while drunk at a bar, was a recent development in New York City underground filmmaking. Shooting shorts, music videos and one feature-length film – Satan, Hold My Hand – on little to no money, the studio produced a prolific amount of work in the short time they existed. Common traits ASS Studios became recognized for were their guerrilla style techniques, being set on the Lower East Side of New York City and featuring a wide array of Art Stars and celebrities including Janeane Garofalo. Though merely developing a small cult following by their controversial public screenings at various bars and venues in New York City, the studio's last feature was produced by Jonathan Ames. Eventually, Sell and Miller, who at the time were in a relationship, parted ways due to creative and personal differences, effectively putting an end to the studio. At the time of the studio's collapse, the team was in the middle of their now-abandoned second feature, Werewolf Bitches From Outer Space, starring Janeane Garofalo, Rachel Trachtenburg, and Robert Prichard. Sell's extensive writings on the creation of ASS, the struggles they faced while working on no-budget, extensive alcohol abuse during times of production, and the end of the studio have been published in Filmmaker Magazine.

== Distribution ==
ASS Studios found distribution with MVD Entertainment who released both a box-set of the studios short films as well as Satan, Hold My Hand. The distribution label is also responsible for releasing work by Sell and Miller prior to their collaboration.

== ASSdance Film Festival ==
After returning to New York City from the 2012 Sundance Film Festival, Sell and co. developed an idea to start their own independent film festival which would only screen films rejected by other film festivals. The ASSdance Film Festival took place during an entire week in 2012, where films from various no-budget filmmakers were shown at numerous Lower East Side venues and eventually hosting a closing night ceremony at Bowery Poetry Club, where every filmmaker was given an award for their work presented by various celebrities including Janeane Garofalo and Michael Musto.

== Select filmography ==
- Elf Workout! (2011)
- Killer Unicorn (2011)
- The Bitches of Bowery (2011)
- The Sinful Bitches (2011)
- Waltz of the Bitches (2013)
- Pretty Pretty Pretty (2013)
- Orgy Whiplash (2013)
- Satan, Hold My Hand (2013)
- Werewolf Bitches From Outer Space - Incomplete. Trailer only. (2013)
