= Faceboy =

American poet

Francis "Faceboy" Hall
- Occupation(s): Actor, Producer, Activist
- Organization: Dance Liberation Front
- Known for: Co-founder of Art Stars
- Notable work: Host of Faceboyz Open Mic

Francis "Faceboy" Hall is an American actor, producer, and activist working in the New York City arts community. Hall, the younger brother of poet and King Missile frontman John S. Hall, is one of the founding members of the Art Stars. Hall has appeared in numerous stage productions and several films, including Robert Downey Sr.'s Too Much Sun and the television series 'Electra Elf'. In addition, Hall was a founding member of the Dance Liberation Front where he has worked to overturn New York City's "no dancing" cabaret laws. A poet and performer himself, Faceboy is best known as the host of the weekly Faceboyz Open Mic, which is now considered to be the longest continually running open mic in New York. He hosted 'Faceboyz Folliez', a monthly show that took place at the Bowery Poetry Club.

== Career ==
'Faceboyz Open Mic' was an open mike show held Sundays at Surf Reality on the Lower East Side, which was described as "one of the city’s most nurturing, freak-friendly weekly happenings."

Regarding Faceboy's performances, The New York Times wrote:

"Faceboy himself did a dramatic reading of personal ads taken from a pornographic magazine. It was, like much of that evening's six hours, unprintable. And very funny."

Ten years later in a full page article in Time Out New York he was described as a performer who, "has persevered through the neighborhood’s gentrification with an almost religious devotion to the art of the open mike."

== Films and Television ==
Hall's film career began In 1990, when he appeared in Robert Downey Sr.'s Too Much Sun alongside childhood friend Robert Downey Jr. In 1998 he played himself in the film When, and in 2003, he played the lead role in a short film titled Nights Like These. Faceboy starred as 'Scroto Baggins' in the short film 'Lord of the Cockrings' directed by Nick Zedd

As well as appearing in the music video 'New York, New York' by Moby, Faceboy also starred in the television series 'Electra Elf' created by Rev. Jen Miller and Nick Zedd.

== Media coverage ==
=== Best ofs and awards ===
- The Village Voice Best of New York: 2001 and 2005
- New York Press Best of Manhattan 1997 and 2003
