= Le Lido =

Theatre in Paris, France

- Interactive map of Le Lido
- Address: 116 Avenue des Champs-Élysées; Paris; France
- Coordinates: 48°52′20.50″N 2°18′2.02″E
- Owner: Accor
- Capacity: 1150
- Type: Cabaret

Construction
- Opened: June 20th 1946, current location since 1977
- Architects: Peynet, Bartoccini and Veccia Scavalli

Website
- lido2paris.com

Le Lido is a musical theatre venue located on the Champs-Élysées in Paris, France. It opened in 1946 at 78 Avenue des Champs-Élysées and moved to its current location in 1977. Until its purchase by Accor in 2021, it was known for its exotic cabaret and burlesque shows including dancers, singers, and other performers. Famous names have performed there including: Edith Piaf, Siegfried and Roy, Hervé Vilard, Sylvie Vartan, Ray Vasquez, Renee Victor, Johnny Hallyday, Maurice Chevalier, Marlene Dietrich, Eartha Kitt, Josephine Baker, Kessler Twins, Elton John, Laurel & Hardy, Dalida, Shirley MacLaine, Mitzi Gaynor, Juliet Prowse, Sid & Marty Krofft, and Noël Coward.

== History ==
Le Lido was preceded in the 1920s by an artificial beach in a townhouse basement which ran as a nightclub and casino in the late night hours. It was founded in 1928 at 78 Avenue des Champs-Élysées by Francisque Chaux, for entertainment which included aquatic shows and bathing, with an interior design by René Berger, inspired by Venice Lido beach.

In 1933, following a compulsory liquidation, the establishment closed.

In 1936, Léon Volterra took over the management and replaced the swimming pool with a performance hall.

"Léon Volterra (1888-1949), the successful manager of famous music halls and theatres in Paris (Olympia, 1916-1918; Casino de Paris, 1917-1929; Théâtre de Paris, 1918-1948; Eden, 1921-1923; Théâtre Marigny, 1925-1946; Lido, 1936-1946)...Elected Mayor of the neighbouring town of Saint-Tropez in 1935 (1935-1941), Léon Volterra transferred to his wife, Simone Volterra (1898-1989), the management of the vineyard and of the theatres. After the divorce of the couple in 1946..."

On the night of 7 June 1941, during the German occupation of Paris, the Spanish ambassador José Félix de Lequerica invited the French writer Paul Morand, actresses Arletty and Josée Laval, Pierre Laval's daughter, to the Lido.

In 1946, Léon Volterra sold the place to Joseph and Louis Clérico. On 20 June 1946, Le Lido was reopened with a new performance hall and a revue entitled Sans rimes ni raison. With the collaboration of Pierre-Louis Guérin and then René Fraday, the Lido developed a "dinner-show" formula.

In 1948, “Miss Bluebell” Margaret Kelly joined Le Lido with her dance company the “Bluebell Girls”.

..."the early days, when exotic creatures graced the stage - tales of runaway chimps, spitting lamas, and camels left stranded on the footpath still trip off the tongues of the Lido's veterans"...

In 1955, after a visit by the entertainment director of the Stardust Resort and Casino, Las Vegas, the Clérico brothers along with Donn Arden brought the Lido to the Stardust Las Vegas. This started a series of imports of Parisian cabaret shows to Las Vegas: Folies Bergère to the Tropicana, Nouvelle Eve to Hotel El Rancho Vegas and Casino de Paris to the Dunes. The Stardust edition of Le Lido closed in 1992.

Between 1955 and 1960, the twin sisters, Alice and Ellen Kessler performed at The Lido. Leila and Valerie Croft, of Victoria, London, identical twins, also performed at The Lido.

In December 1964, Paris Match photographed Elizabeth Taylor, Aristotle Onassis and Claude Pompidou at a Lido première .

In 1977, Le Lido moved to the UGC Normandie on the Champs-Élysées.

"In 1978 the huge space under (UGC Normandie) the theatre’s former circle and stage were transformed into the Lido cabaret (1,200 seats) sharing the same entrance."

In 2006, Sodexo, the international food service company, purchased Le Lido and invested 24 million euro into developing its show.

27 revues were created between 20 June 1946 and 2 April 2015.

The hotel group Accor bought Le Lido in 2021 and dismissed most of the permanent employees, mainly artists and technicians, in order to replace the costly dinner shows and revues with less expensive musical theatre productions.

== Cabaret shows ==
The Lido was closed from December 2, 2014, to April 2, 2015, while a new version of the show was prepared. The new version was developed by Franco Dragone. Each version of Le Lido was made up of 10–20 scenes and ran for about an hour and a half. Two shows were run every day of the week. A pre-show dinner, featuring a robotic orchestra, was offered with the first evening show of each day at an additional cost.

In spring 2015, Franco Dragone created a new show for Le Lido titled Paris Merveilles.

"Currently (30 November 2016) about 60 girls appear on stage each night: 44 girls both topless and clothed (known as nudes and Bluebells) and 16 Kelly Boys. Roughly half are French; the rest hail particularly from the UK, Australia and Russia."

Each Le Lido show featured singers and dancers, which always included the famous Bluebell Girls. A few featured dancers, showgirls and lead singers were sometimes added. The Lido was known for its spectacular costumes featuring thousands of dollars in feathers and rhinestones, rich fabrics, and top quality furs.

The opening or "theme" scene welcomed the audience and set the tone for the evening. It also sometimes set the colour scheme for the show and featured special effects and lighting. Music could be original or a medley of current popular songs mixed with music from Broadway or Hollywood films; often the opening number was a potpourri of styles and performers could change costumes several times. Between the production numbers, specialty "vaudeville/cabaret" acts were featured, such as jugglers, acrobats or magicians. At least one scene would feature water effects – another thing the Lido was known for. The stage itself could be raised and lowered, change back and forth into an ice rink or swimming pool, and feature elaborate set pieces which came up from below. The closing number often featured a number called "Merci Beaucoup" (featured in the television show Shirley Maclaine at The Lido de Paris) and usually had some particularly spectacular costumes.

Among the last of its kind, the Lido had a special place in the history of nightclubs and floorshows and continued a tradition of the "naughty but nice" opulent production shows originally started by the Folies Bergère.

== Bluebell Girls ==
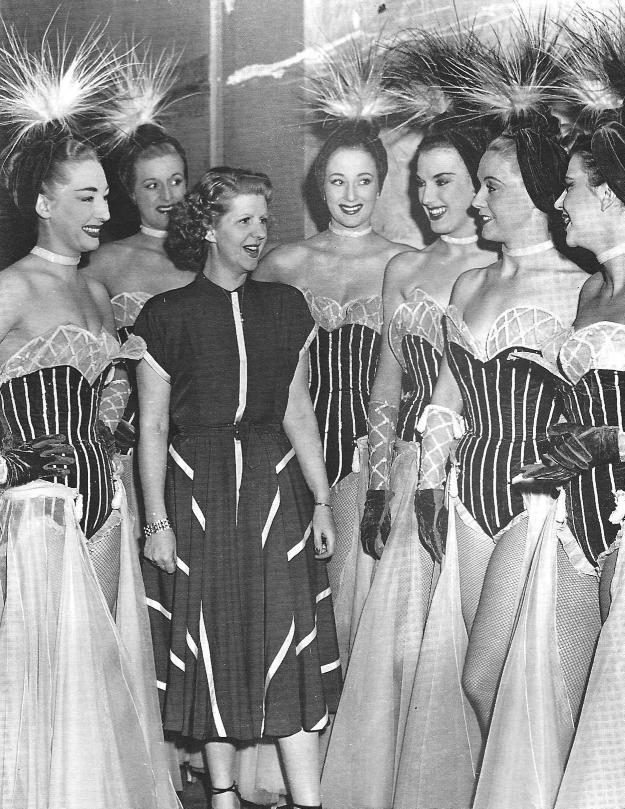
Margaret Kelly with the Bluebell Girls in 1948

Founded by Margaret Kelly, also known as Miss Bluebell, the dancers of the Lido were known as the Bluebell Girls. Until her retirement in 1986, each dancer was selected by Kelly. The dancers were afterwards under the direction of Pierre Rambert until his retirement in December 2014. According to Forbes, they were "some of the world’s most beautiful and talented burlesque dancers". The cast came from all over the world, and were noted for their statuesque height, averaging 5' 11" (minimum 1.75 meters).

== Production history ==
Every few years, Le Lido developed a new version of its show. The show used to change more frequently, but in later times each iteration could run for several years until the management felt it had run its course and a new production was called for. Each show could take millions of dollars to develop. The following are the titles of each show produced by the Le Lido:

- 1946 – Sans Rimes Ni Raisons
- 1946 – Mississippi
- 1947 – Made in Paris
- 1948 – Confetti (The Bluebell Girls debut)
- 1949 – Bravo
- 1950 – Enchantment
- 1951 – Rendez-vous
- 1953 – Gala
- 1953 – Voilà
- 1954 – Desirs
- 1955 – Voulez-vous
- 1956 – C'est Magnifique
- 1957 – Prestige
- 1959 – Avec Plaisir
- 1961 – Pour Vous
- 1962 – Suivez-Moi
- 1964 – Quelle Nuit
- 1966 – Pourquoi Pas?
- 1969 – Grand Prix
- 1971 – Bonjour La Nuit
- 1972 – Grand Jeu
- 1977 – Allez Lido
- 1981 – Cocorico
- 1985 – Panache
- 1990 – Bravissimo
- 1994 – C'est Magique
- 2003 – Bonheur (closed December 2, 2014)
- 2015 – Paris Merveilles (Paris Wonders)

== Media featuring Le Lido ==
Shirley Maclaine at the Lido (1979) produced by Gary Smith and Dwight Hemion – Nominated for a Primetime Emmy for Outstanding Comedy-Variety or Music Program.

Few scenes from the music video named Samajavaragamana of the feature film soundtrack of 2020 Indian Tollywood (Telugu) film Ala Vaikunthapurramuloo featuring Allu Arjun, Pooja Hegde was made a shot in Lido De Paris

The Bluebell Girls were featured in a 1960 episode of Close-Up, a Canadian TV show broadcast on the CBC

Numerous clips of several of the shows of the last 20 years and even full videos of all the production numbers from some editions are available on YouTube.

== See also ==
- Showgirl

Venues:

- Casino de Paris
- Folies Bergère
- Minsky's Burlesque
- Moulin Rouge
- Paradis Latin
- Tropicana Club

Theatre groups:

- Cabaret Red Light

Shows:

- Absinthe – a Las Vegas show
- Jubilee! – a revue show in Las Vegas
- Peepshow – a burlesque show in Nevada
- Sirens of TI – a Las Vegas casino show
