= Margaret Kelly (dancer) =

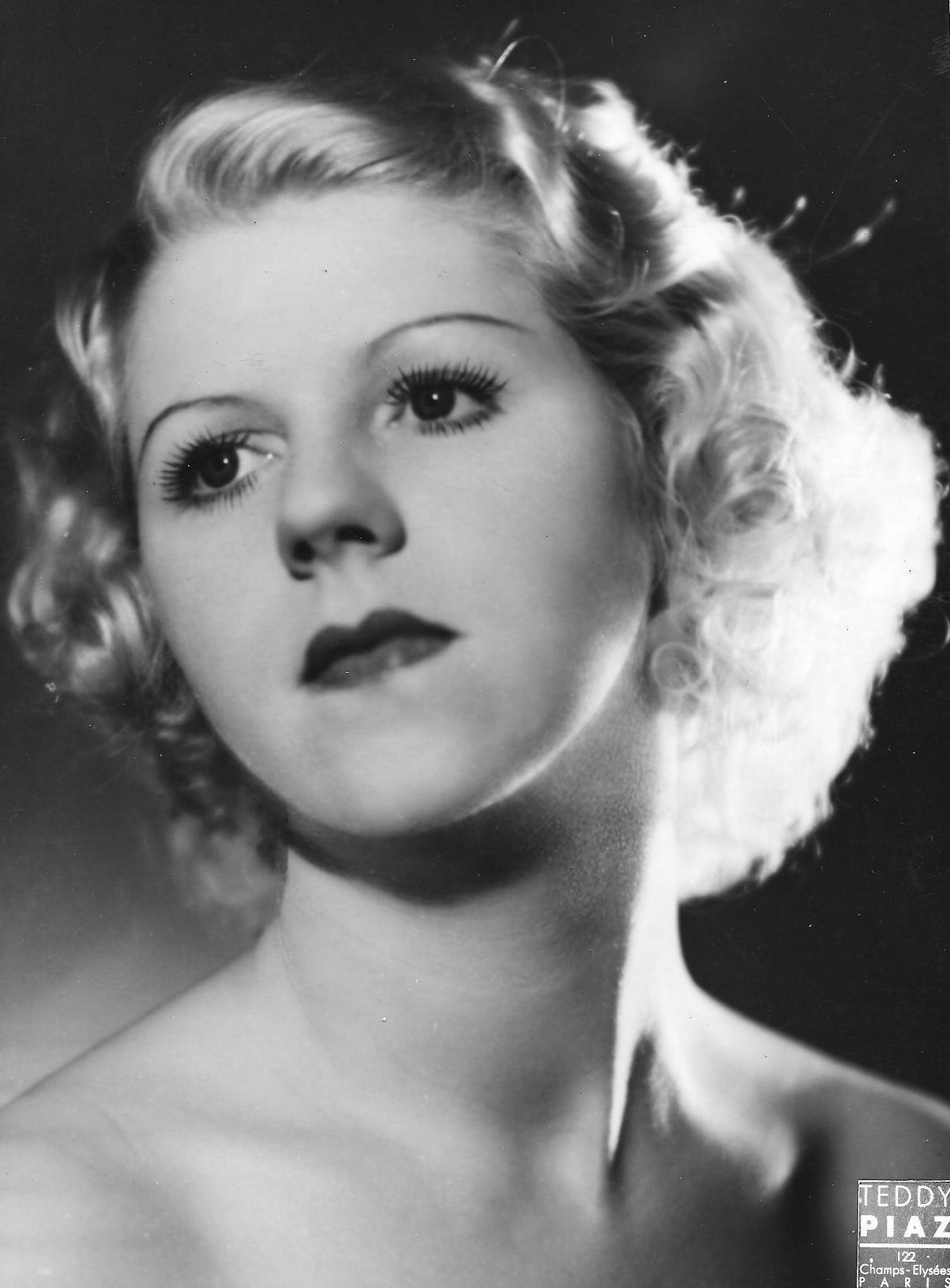

Background information
- Also known as: Miss Bluebell
- Born: Margaret Kelly; 24 June 1910; Dublin, Ireland
- Died: 11 September 2004 (aged 94) Paris, France
- Occupation: Dancer

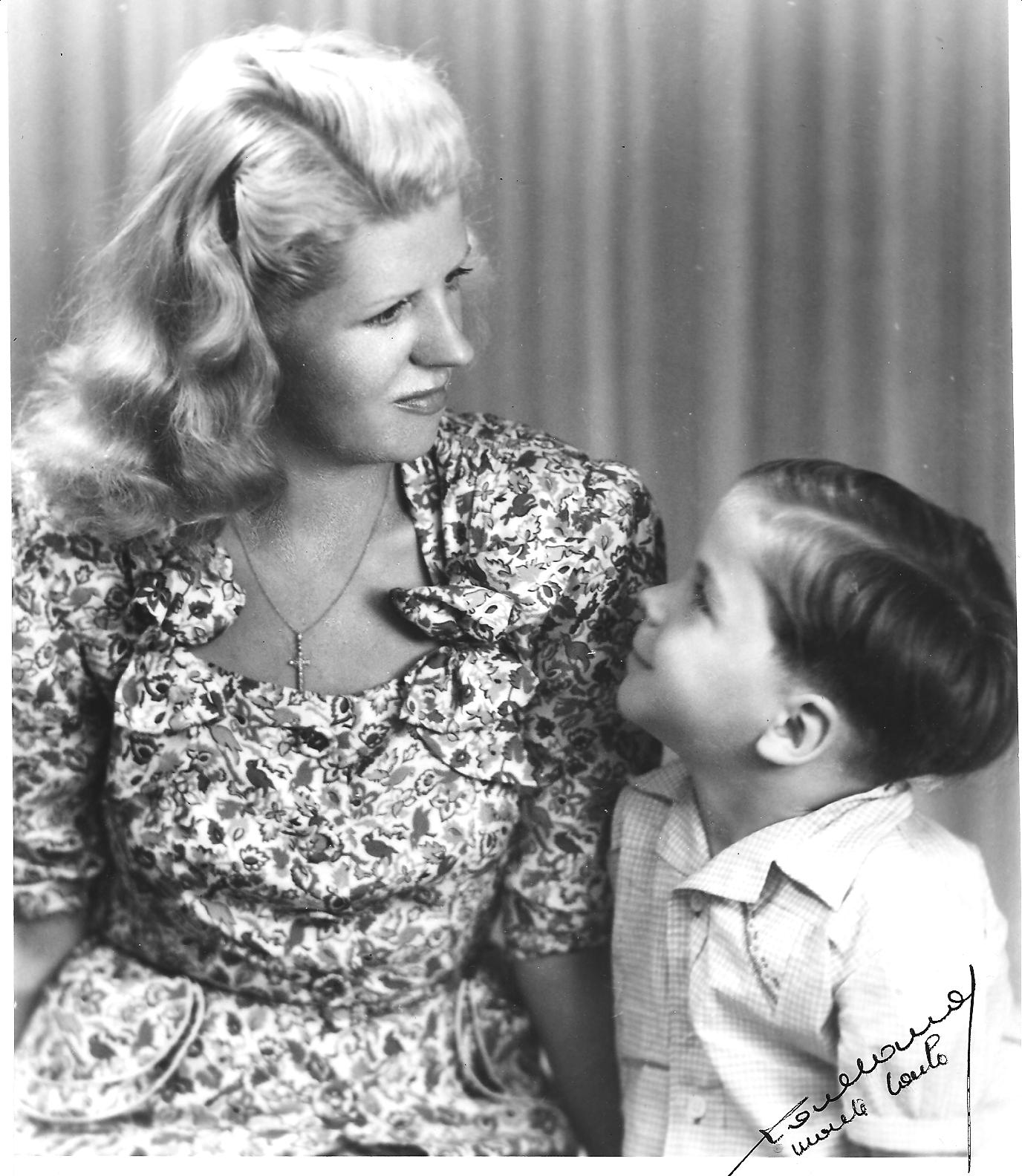
Margaret Kelly with her son Francis

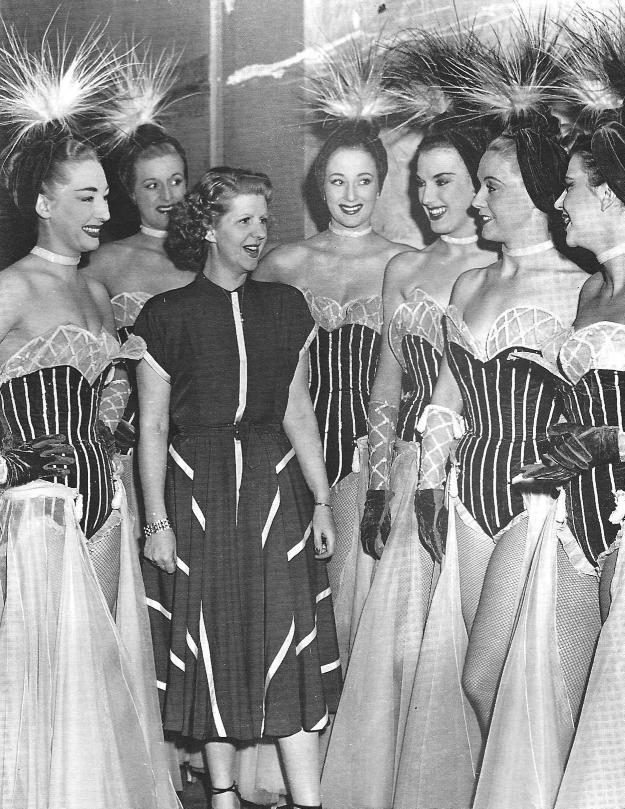
Margaret Kelly with Bluebell Girls, 1948

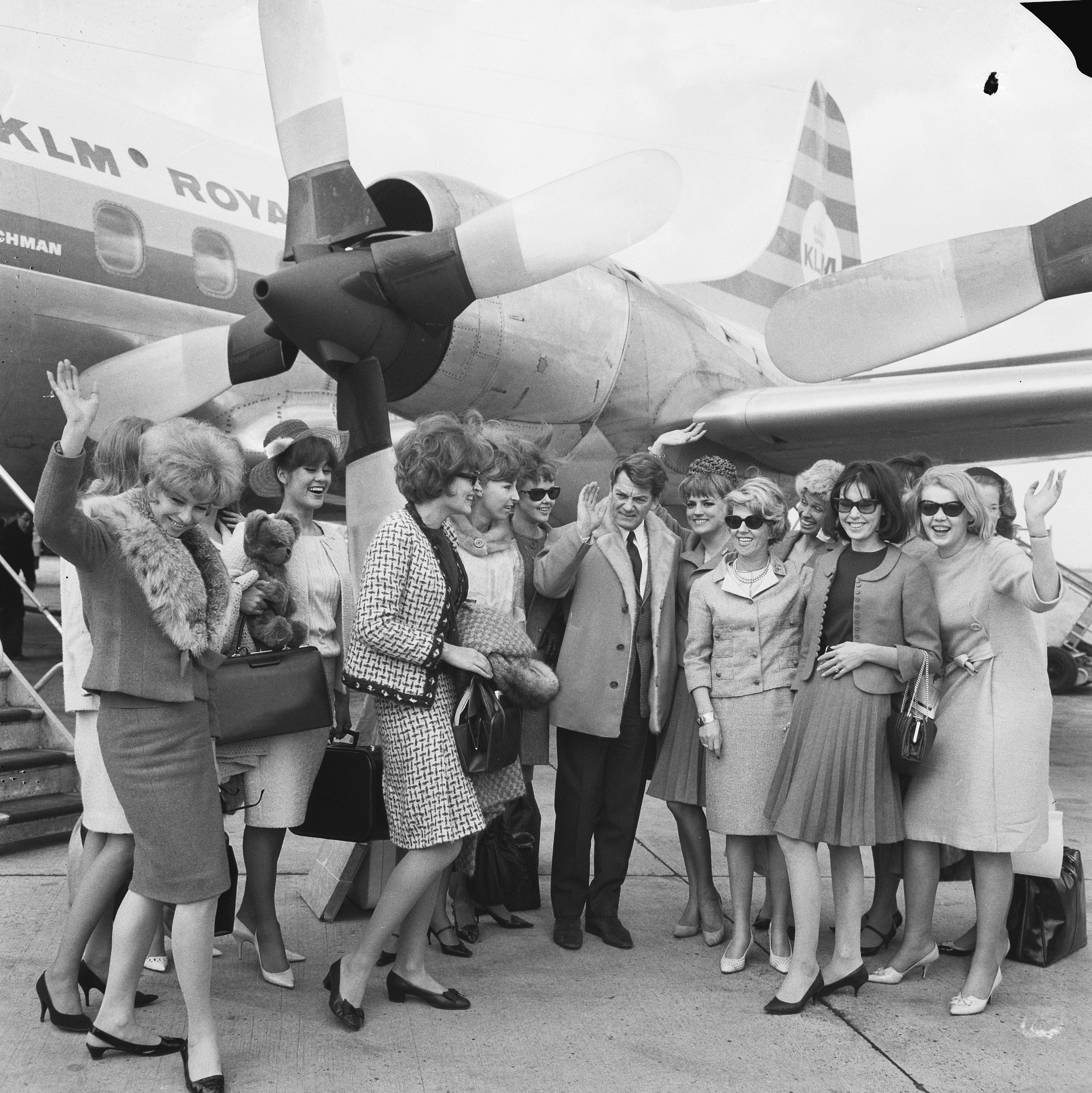
Jean Marais with Bluebell Girls, 1965

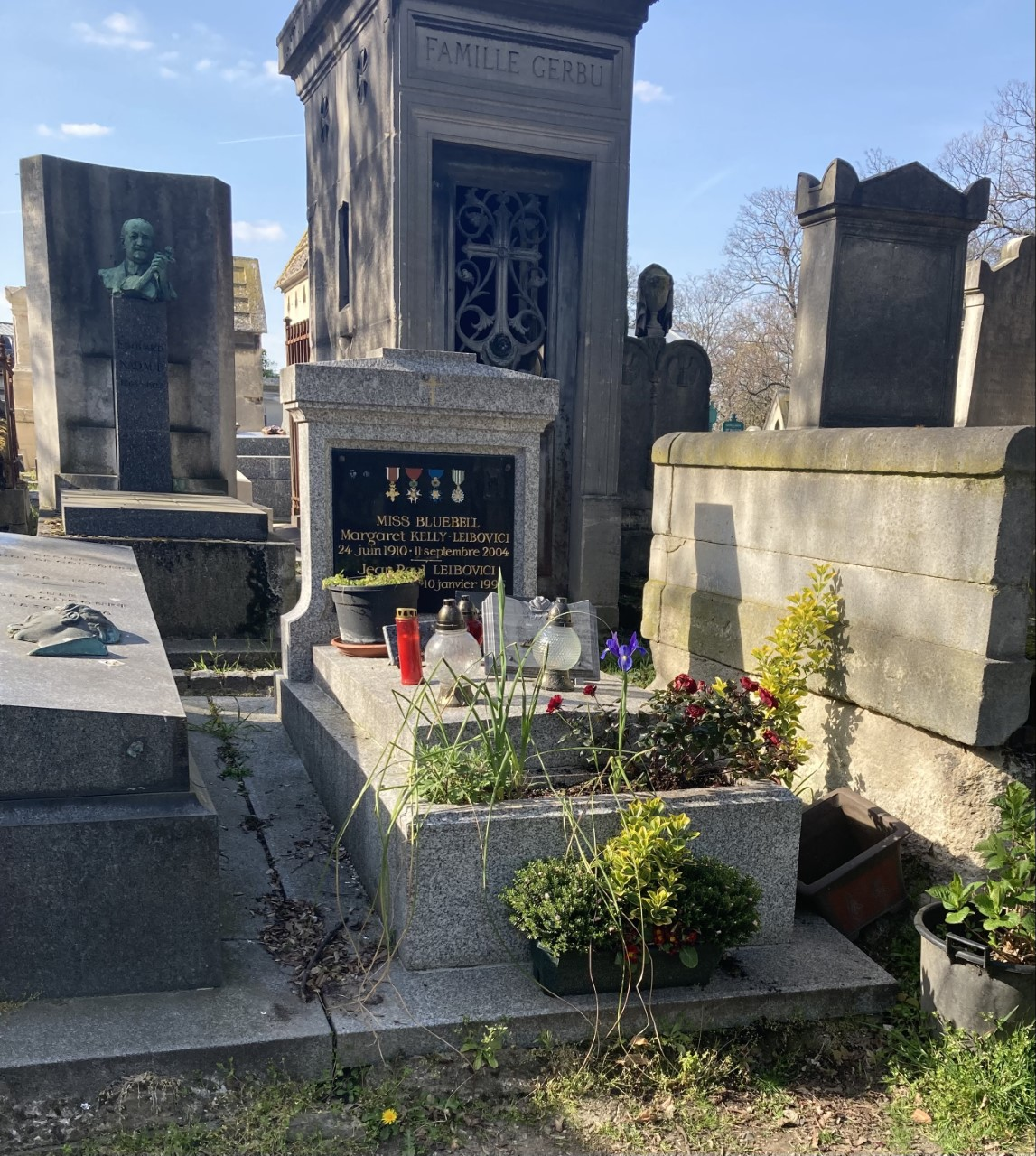
Grave of Margaret Kelly, Montmartre Cemetery

Margaret Leibovici OBE (née Kelly; 24 June 1910 – 11 September 2004), known as Miss Bluebell, was an Irish-French dancer who was the founder of the Bluebell Girls dance troupe.

== Biography ==
Margaret Kelly was born in Dublin on 24 June 1910 at the Rotunda Hospital. She never knew her parents. An Irish priest entrusted her to Mary Murphy, a spinster who worked at home as a dressmaker. In 1916, following the Easter uprising, both moved to Liverpool, where, on the direction of a doctor, Kelly was registered in a dance class to strengthen her frail legs. Quickly, it appeared that she had a great talent.

== Career ==
At the age of 14, Kelly left school and joined a Scottish dance troupe called the Hot Jocks. Nine months later, she was contracted to the Scala (Berlin) (former Berliner Eispalast) by noted producer Alfred Jackson, manager of the Jackson Girls. Kelly remained at the Scala for 5 years.

Beginning in 1930, Kelly danced in Paris for the Folies Bergère. In 1932, when she was 22, she created her own troupe there called the Bluebell Girls.

"Mistinguett later had them fired, but, undaunted, Kelly moved to the Paramount cinema (on the Boulevard des Capucines) which with lavish cine-variety shows was trying to emulate New York's Radio City Music Hall. "Les Blue Bell Paramount Girls" became the Parisian Rockettes, (dancing during the interval) even appearing in a number of frothy film musicals. As a full-time administrator and choreographer, Kelly installed her second troupe at the Folies Bergère, and imposed a minimum height of 5ft 9in (she was only 5ft 7in), recruiting them from Britain because she found British girls were better team players." (French girls, Miss Kelly explains, "do not have the proper breast line"—meaning that they tend to be smaller-busted.)

In 1939, she married Marcel Leibovici, a pianist and composer at the Folies Bergère. During the Second World War, they had two sons: Patrick (1939) and Francis (1941). Following the German occupation of Paris in 1940, Kelly, now pregnant with Francis, was arrested by the French police and interned in Besançon. She was freed from custody by the Irish chargé d'affaires, Count O'Kelly. However, in 1942, Marcel was arrested and deported to the internment camp of Gurs. The French Resistance helped him flee from Gurs and return to Paris, where he was hidden by his wife opposite the Prefecture of Police building until the Liberation. During this time, Kelly ensured him food and security at the risk of her life. She bribed the concierge of the building, to keep her from denouncing Marcel to the Nazis, but the concierge denounced others hidden in the same building. Suspected of protecting her husband, she was interrogated by the Gestapo, but in spite of intense questioning, Kelly succeeded in not divulging his whereabouts. François Truffaut's film The Last Metro is inspired by this event in the life of Margaret Kelly and her husband.

"In 1945, after the war, Margaret Kelly, Marcel Leibovici and their children remained in Paris, and began working with Donn Arden, an American choreographer and producer at the Paris Lido. Together they came up with the concept of the dinner show."

After the war, Kelly began a fruitful collaboration with Donn Arden, the American choreographer and producer, to produce shows at the Paris Lido. While beginning with a modest contract in 1947, the Bluebell Girls quickly became the sole stars of the Lido shows and gained notoriety locally and nationally. Their shows were different from the others; Bluebell had an inventory of the tallest and most beautiful dancers who, with their costumes and high heels, towered over everybody on stage. Donn Arden's shows differentiated themselves from the others by the mixture of movement, colour, music and light in a kaleidoscope of impetuous rhythm. By the end of the 1950s, the Bluebell Girls had become an internationally recognized organization. Their base in Paris was supplemented by what had become permanent troupes in Las Vegas, other nations in Europe, Africa, as well as eastern Asia.

From 1947, Marcel Leibovici had entered in full partnership with his wife, managing the orchestral, business and financial side of her operation and, thanks to his considerable flair, had made the Bluebell Girls one of the most celebrated and prestigious dancing troupes in the world. In 1961, Marcel Leibovici was killed in a car crash, having fallen asleep at the wheel, and Kelly then had to take over all his business responsibilities. Margaret now became wholly responsible for their four children: Patrick, Francis, Florence and Jean-Paul, and kept the Bluebell's programme in steady operation, even increasing the number of troupes and activities by continually adding innovative new elements and artists. One of her most noteworthy innovations was the introduction of the "topless" dancer in 1970. However Le Lido 1953 Voilà, Lido 1952 revue Gala, Lido 1951 revue Rendez-vous, were topless.

"Her decision to go "topless" with some of the performers, she stated, had to do with emphasizing female beauty rather than leaning toward burlesque."

"When topless dancing lost some of its shock value, Kelly allowed it at the request of the Bluebell Girls."

She had trained over 10,000 Bluebell Girls and hundreds of Kelly Boys.

== Later life ==
In 1986 Kelly went into semi-retirement and left the Paris Lido, but she continued her global activities, particularly in Las Vegas with the MGM Grand Hotel. The Paris Le Lido bought her brand name Bluebell Girls, allowing the name to be continued in shows. She retired at 79.

== Awards and tributes ==
Kelly was decorated Officer of the Order of the British Empire, Chevalier of the Legion of Honour for 72 years of professional activity as maîtresse de ballet, Chevalier des Arts et Lettres and Chevalier de l'Ordre National du Mérite.

In 1986 the BBC broadcast an eight-part drama series called Bluebell produced by Richard Bates and George Perry who wrote her authorized biography. Carolyn Pickles played the part of Margaret Kelly.

In 1987, the British sculptor Doreen Kern realized Kelly's life-size bronze portrait bust, it was placed on her tomb (and stolen on 18 July 2008)..

On June 24, 2010, Bluebell Girls belonging to four generations and coming from around the world celebrated the first centenary of the birth of Kelly by meeting at the Lido de Paris. At the end of the show, they went on the stage and joined the Bluebell Girls who had performed.

== Last years ==
Her children: Jean-Paul, Patrick, Francis, Florence. She smoked a pack of Stuyvesant cigarettes every day of her adult life.

In 1961, Kelly's husband died in a car accident.

"But not long after receiving the légion d'honneur, France's top civilian award, in 2000, she became too frail to leave her home regularly."

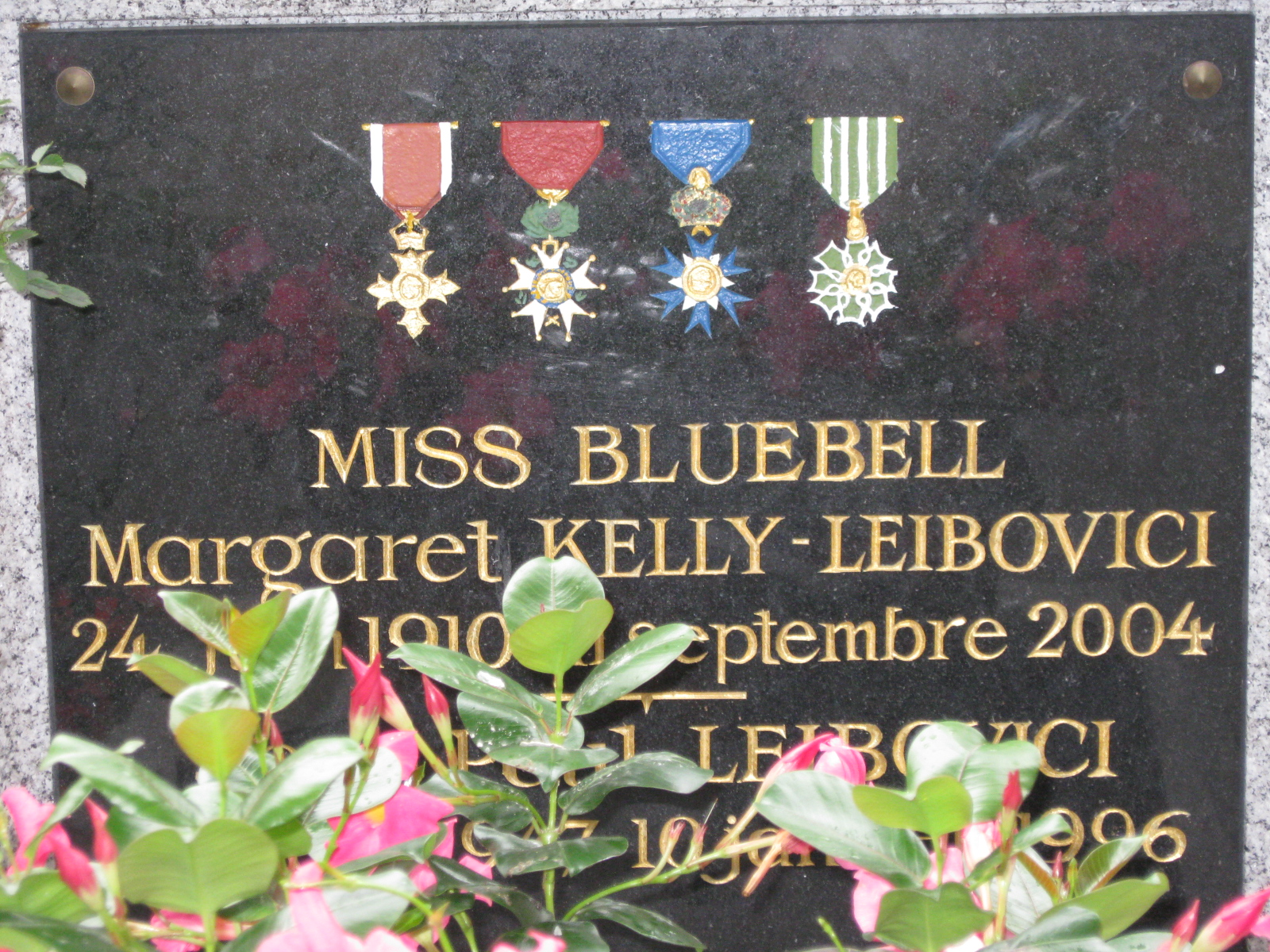
Plaque on the grave of Margaret Kelly and her son Jean-Paul

Kelly died in her sleep on 11 September 2004, aged 94. She is buried in Montmartre Cemetery.
