= Jean de Paleologu =

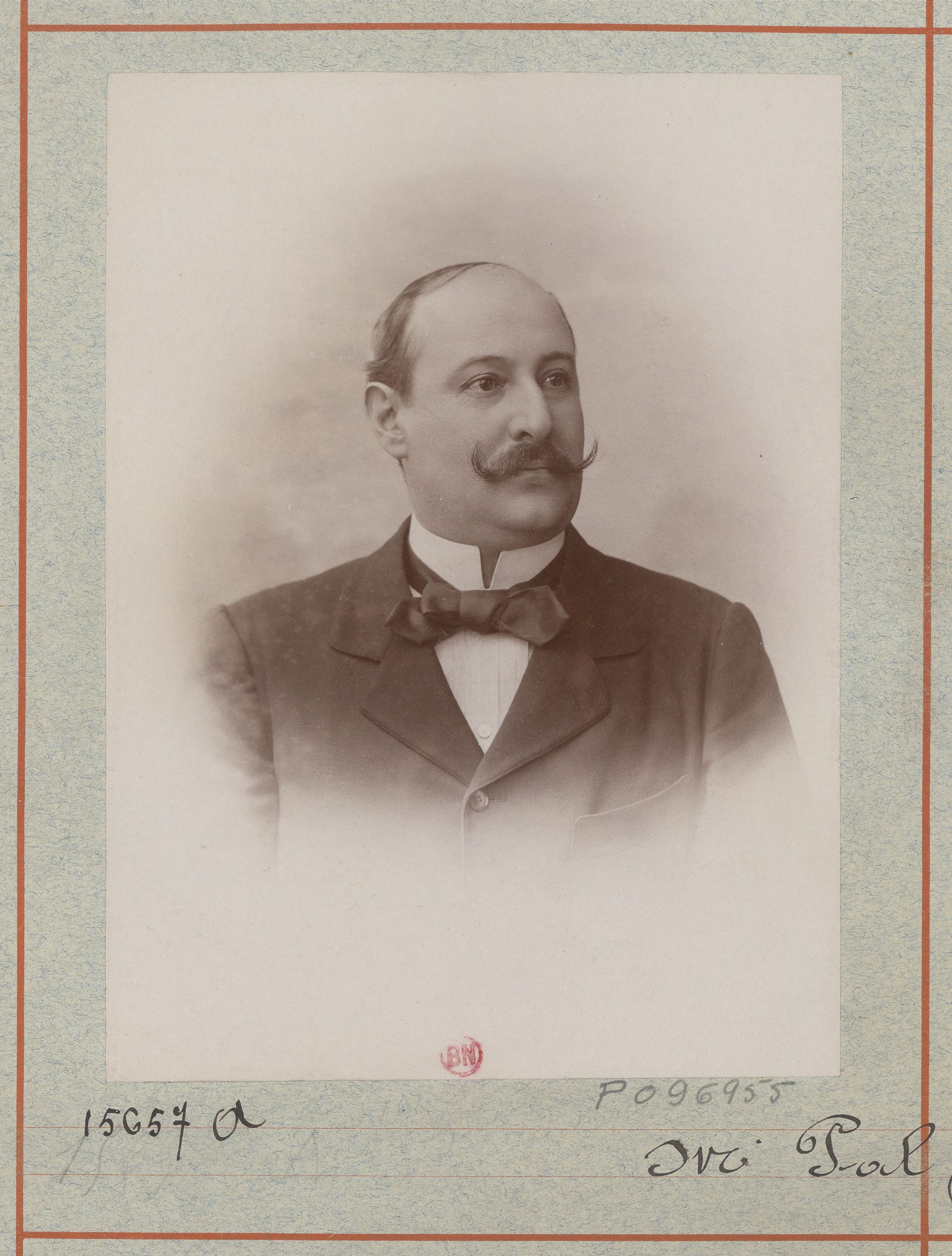
Jean de Paleologu by Nadar (1890s)

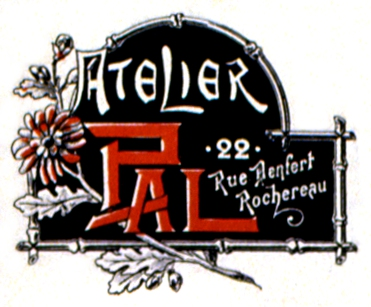
Logo of the Atelier PAL

Jean de Paleologu (or Paleologue) (1855 – 24 November 1942) was a Romanian poster artist, painter, and illustrator, who often used Pal or PAL as his signature or logo and was active in France and the United States.

== Career ==
Born in Bucharest, he trained in England, then returned to Romania and attended a military academy. He visited London again several times, then moved to Paris. He left Paris for the United States in 1900.

Paleologu illustrated Petits poèmes russes (Small Russian Poems) by Catulle Mendès, published by Charpentier in 1893. His work also appeared in many periodicals, including Vanity Fair, Strand Magazine, New York Herald Tribune, Plume, Rire, Cocorico, Les Maîtres de l'Affiche, Froufrou, Sans-Gêne, and Vie en Rose.

He painted portraits of comedians and music-hall performers, and created some of the most influential poster advertisements for bicycle manufacturers (such as the Déesse) and cycling events, often featuring beautiful women.

During the latter part of his life in the United States, he worked in applied graphics: at first magazines, then ads and publicity for the auto, film and animation industries. He died in Miami Beach.

== Gallery ==
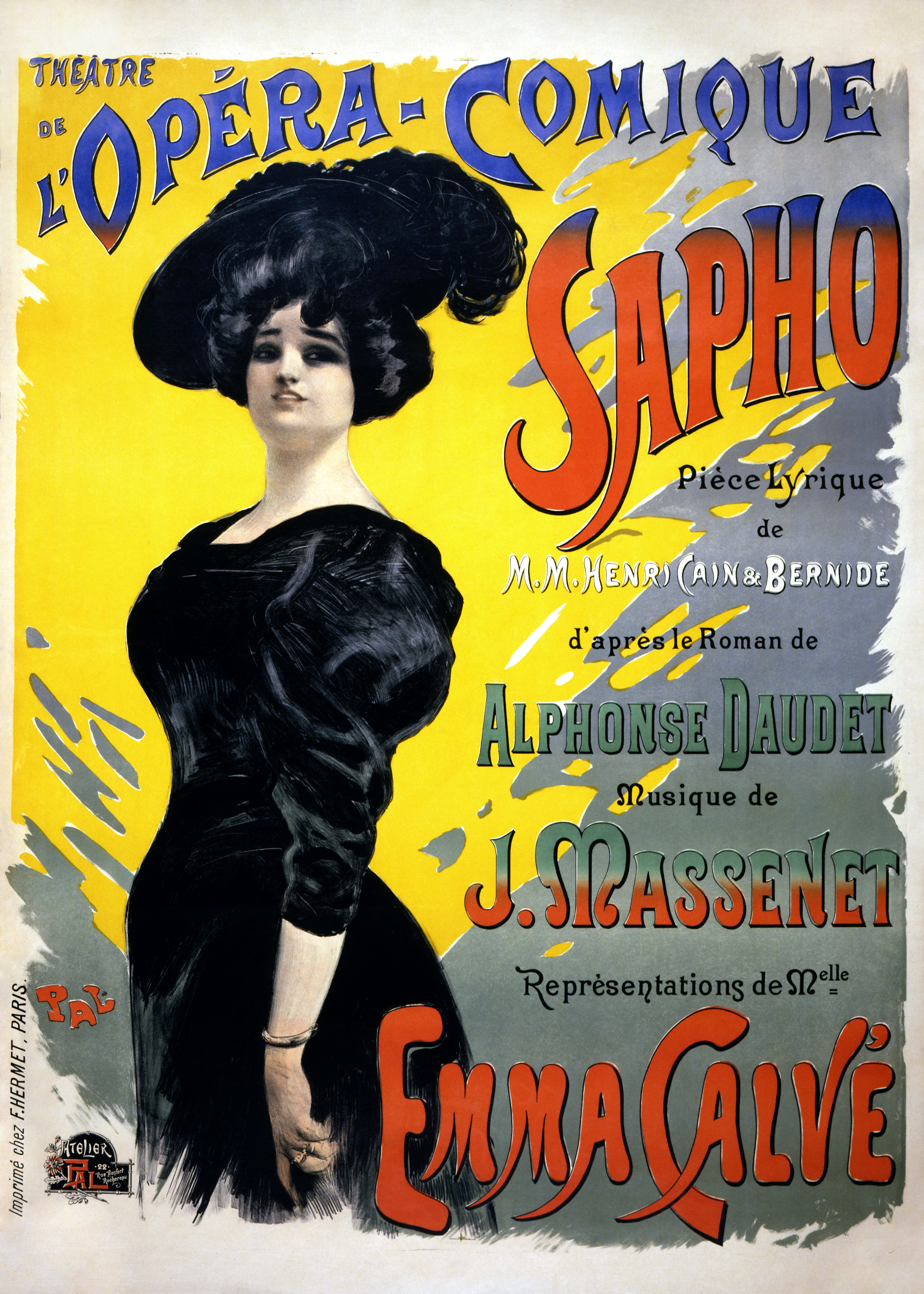
Poster for the premiere of Massenet's Sapho

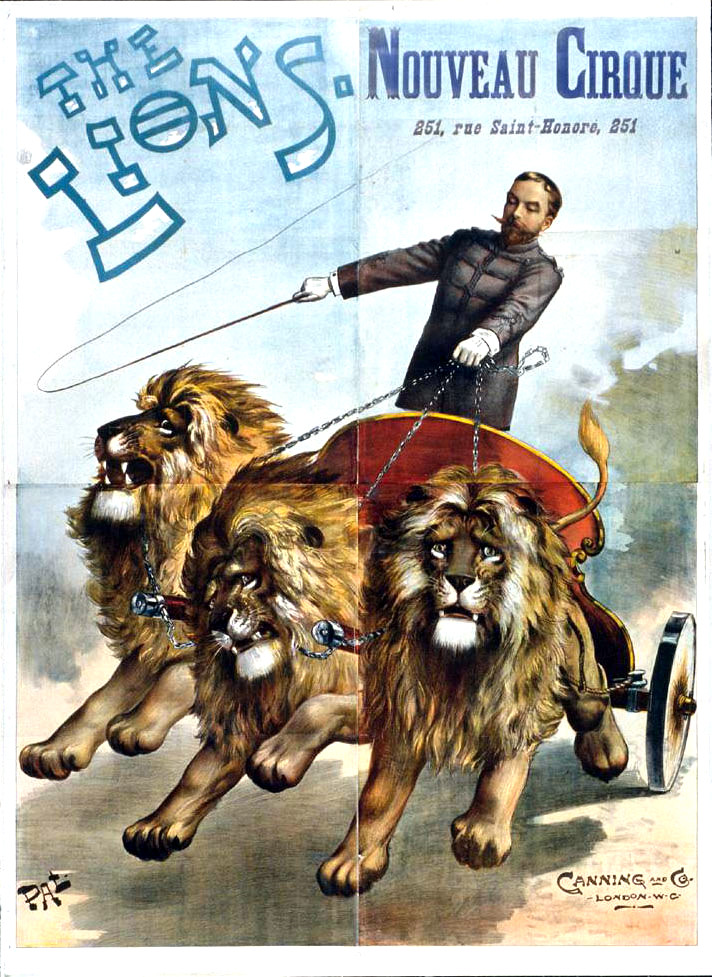
Poster for the Nouveau Cirque

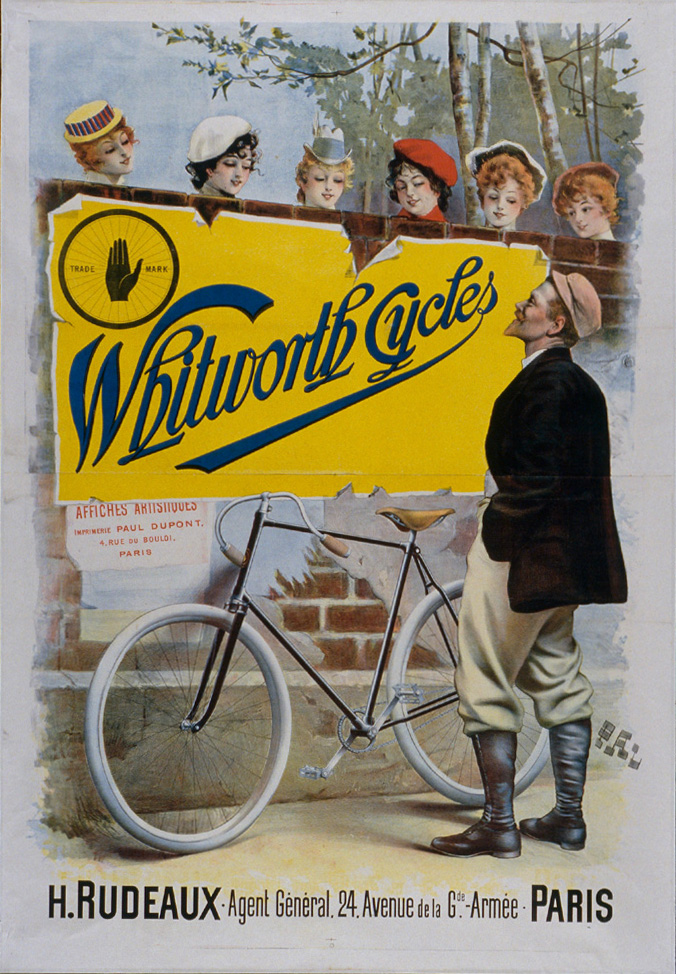
Poster for Whitworth Cycles

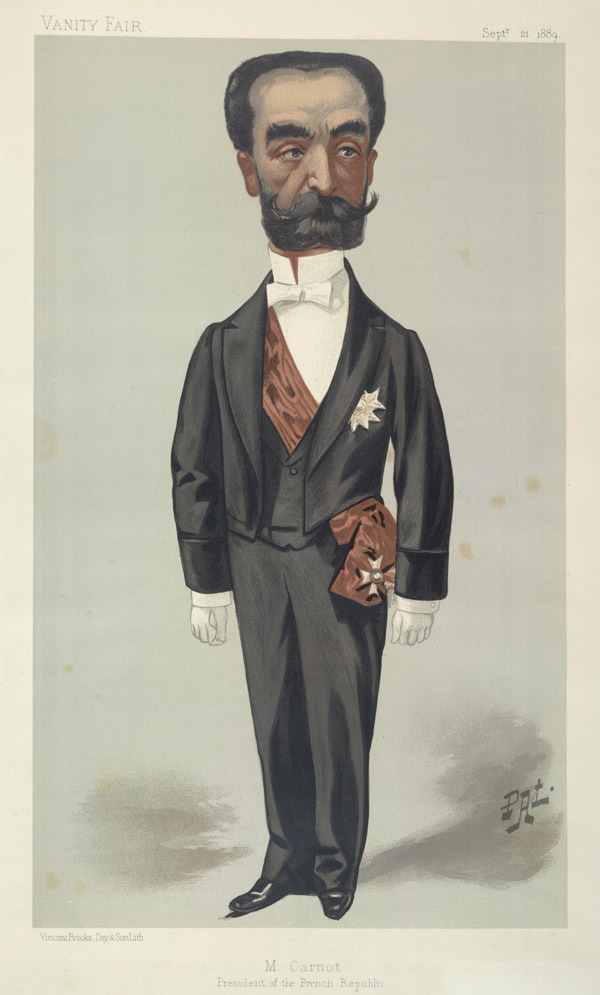
Sadi Carnot
Vanity Fair, 1889

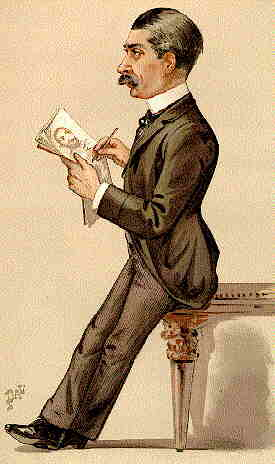
Leslie Ward ("Spy")
Vanity Fair, 1889

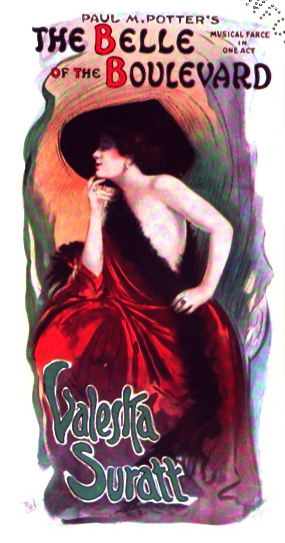
Valeska Suratt
"The Belle of the Boulevard"

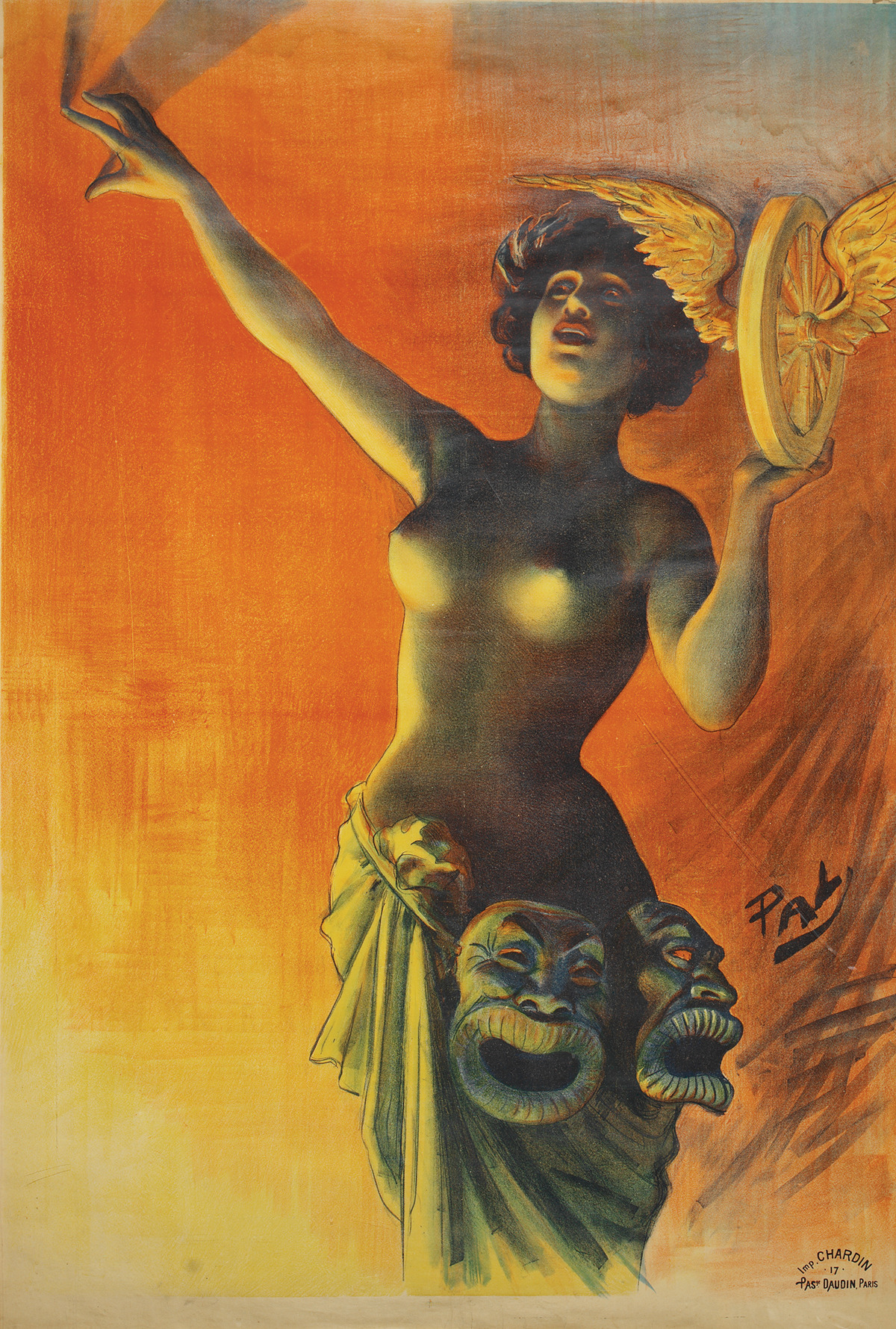

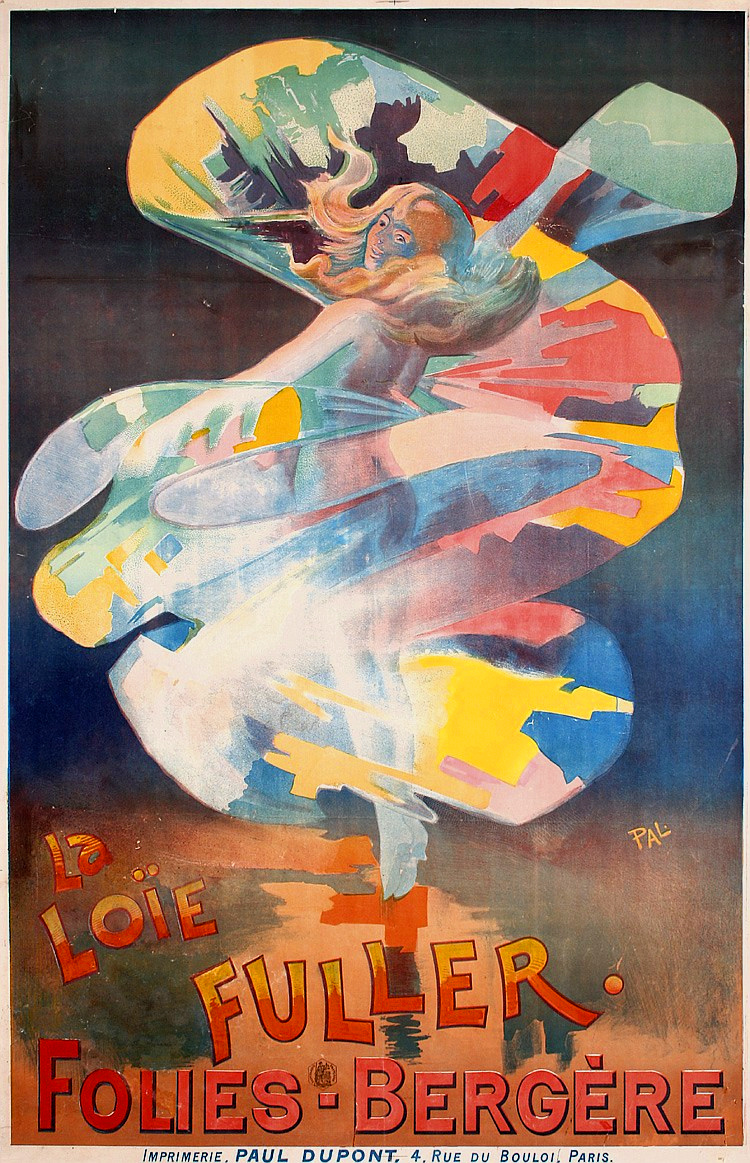

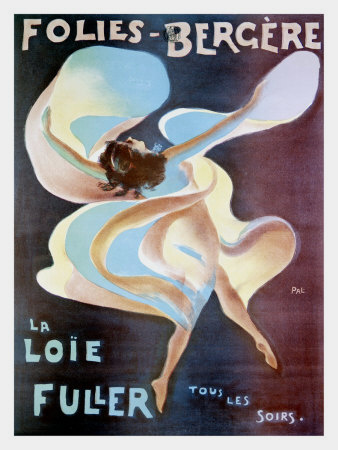
Loie Fuller

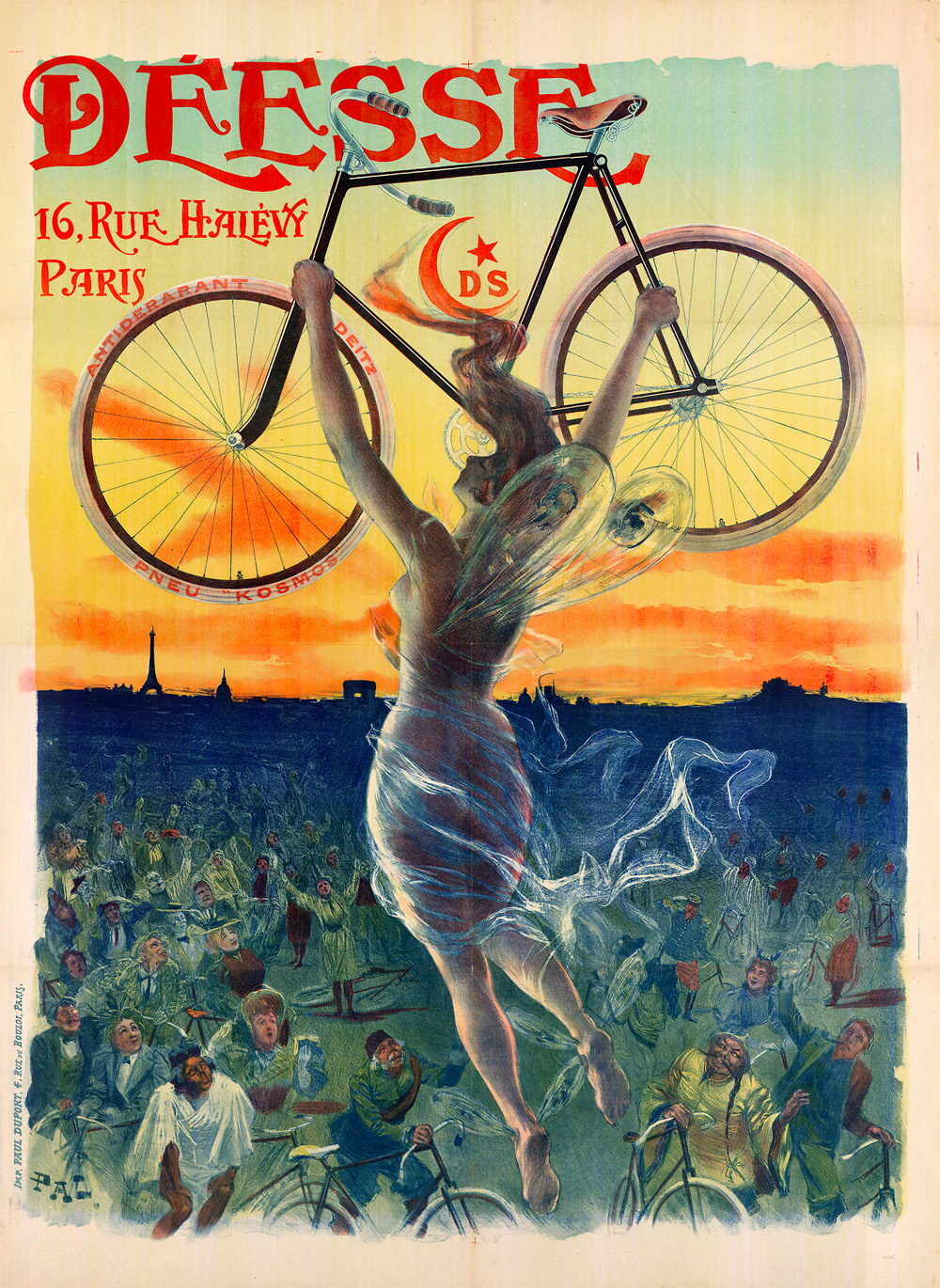

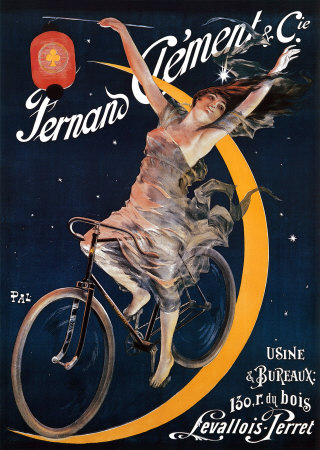
Advertising poster circa 1897

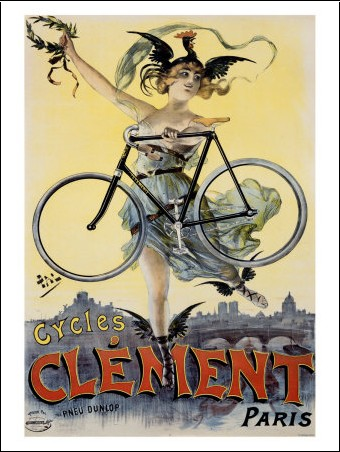
Advertising poster for Cycles Clément
