= Jen Miller =

American artist

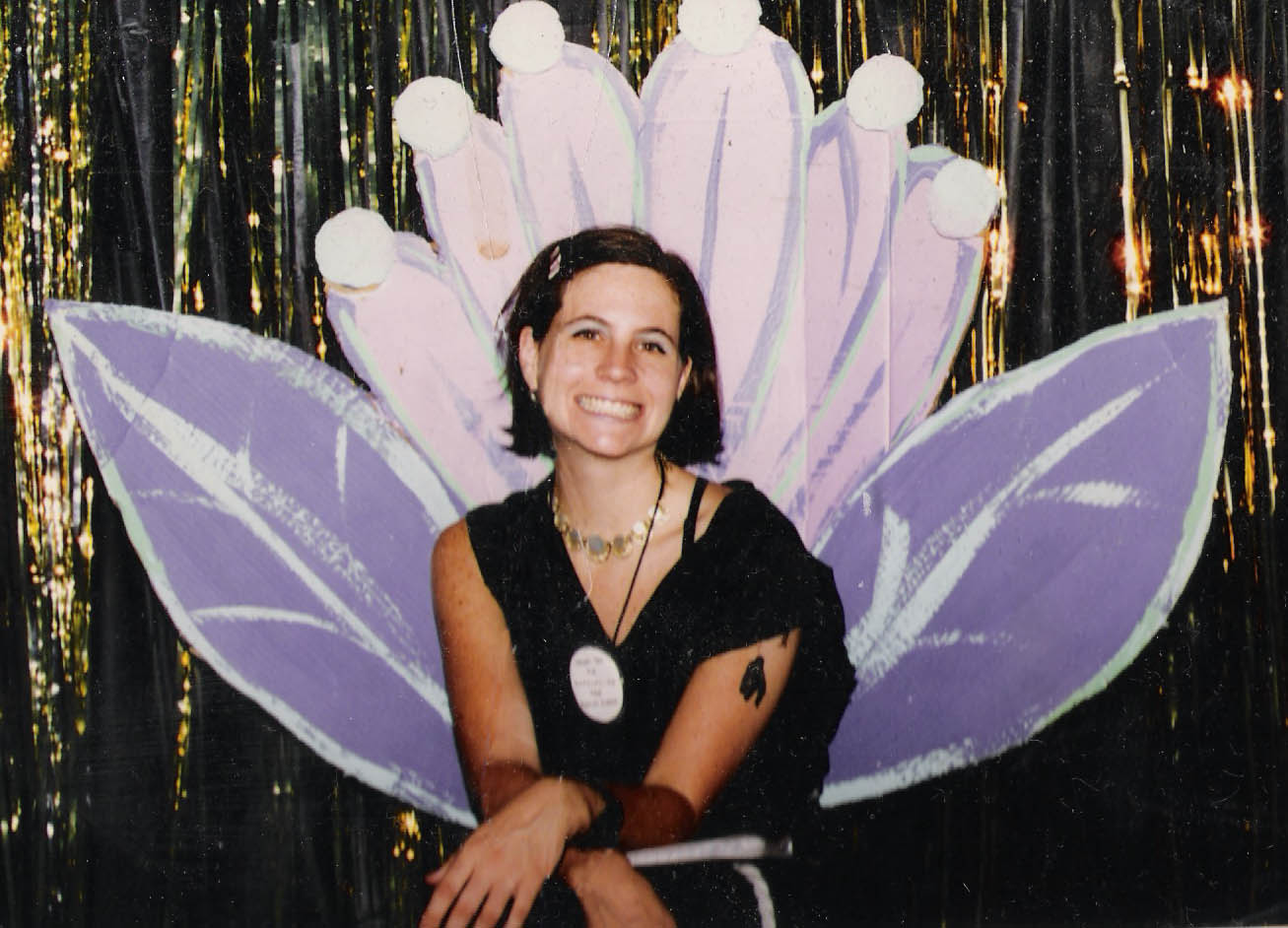
- Born: Jennifer Miller; July 24, 1972 (age 53); Silver Spring, Maryland, U.S.
- Other names: Rev Jen, Reverend Jen, Saint Reverend Jen

Jennifer Miller (also known as Saint Reverend Jen and Reverend Jen; born July 24, 1972, in Silver Spring, Maryland) is an American performer, actress, author, painter, director, and poet residing in Brooklyn, New York City.

In 2002, Miller was named the Village Voice's "Best D.I.Y. Go-Girl" in the category of "Over 21".

== Early life ==
Miller was born on July 24, 1972, and was raised in Silver Spring, Maryland. Her mother is an immigrant from Scotland. Her father worked as a defense attorney and later as a judge, working as an artist in his spare time. She attended Albert Einstein High School and Springbrook High School.

== Career ==
After graduating from the School of Visual Arts in 1994, Miller began performing at Faceboy's Open Mic Night at Collective:Unconscious, then located on Avenue B in Manhattan's East Village. When Faceboy's show moved to Surf Reality, he suggested Miller host an open mic at Collective:Unconscious, which was reopening on Ludlow Street. Together, Faceboy and Jen created the weekly Wednesday night "Anti-Slam", which Miller hosted. Unlike poetry slams where poets are judged on a scale of one to ten, every performer at the Anti-Slam got a ten, referring to every performer as an Art Star. Jen hosted the show at the Ludlow Street location until Collective lost its lease in 2005, after which she continued to host it at the Collective Tribeca location followed by several other locations including Cake Shop, Mo Pitkins and Bowery Poetry Club.

Throughout the nineties, Miller collaborated with other performers. She was a cast member of Toolz of the New School, a cable access comedy show where she often appeared as Doo-Doo, the fifth teletubby. She also performed in Surf Reality's "Grindhouse" shows and at Luna Lounge's "Eating It" comedy show. At this time, she also began making handmade books, including Sex Symbol for the Insane, which she sold at Printed Matter.

Miller has written multiple books such as Elf Girl (Simon & Schuster, 2011), Live Nude Elf (Soft Skull Press, 2009) and Reverend Jen's Really Cool Neighborhood. For several years, Jen played Electra Elf in The Adventures of Electra Elf and Fluffer, a low budget Public-access television show she wrote and produced along with Nick Zedd.^{[8]}

She has also acted as the founder for several projects, such as the magazine Art Star Scene and ASS Studios,^{[9]} which she co-founded with Courtney Sell. ASS Studios produced several movies including the feature-length, Satan Hold My Hand, which Jen wrote and starred in.

In 2000, Miller founded Reverend Jen's Lower East Side Troll Museum, a museum dedicated to the Troll doll, which she ran out of her apartment until 2016,^{[10]} when she was evicted. Following her eviction, she experienced a series of hardships, including a brief period of homelessness, the death of her boyfriend from brain cancer, and the death of her dog.

Miller lives in Sheepshead Bay, Brooklyn where she paints full-time and continues to exhibit her work. Her most recent solo show, Divine Discontent, which opened at Dollhaus II in 2021, featured over 30 paintings.

== Filmography ==
- Satan Hold My Hand (2013)
- Blood Possession (short 2013)
- The Trachtenburg Family Slideshow Players: Off & On Broadway (2006)
- Electra Elf: The Beginning Parts One & Two (2005) – directed by Nick Zedd
- I Was a Quality of Life Violation (2004) – directed by Nick Zedd
- Lord of the Cockrings (2002) – directed by Nick Zedd
- Thus Spake Zarathustra (2001) – directed by Nick Zedd
- Elf Panties: The Movie (2001) – – directed by Nick Zedd edited by Andreas Troeger
- Terror Firmer (1999)

=== Stage performances ===
- Housatrash (2000, as Joanie)

== Bibliography ==
- June (2015)
- Reverend Jen's Really Cool Neighborhood (2003)
- Live Nude Elf: The Sexperiments of Reverend Jen (2008)
- Elf Girl (2011)
- BDSM 101 (2013)
- Sex Symbol for the Insane
- Cliff Notes for Sex Symbol for the Insane
- Diary of an Art Star
- Magical Elf Panties : A Coloring Book
- Elf Panties: Audio-Visual Fun!
- Reverend Jen's Really Cool Neighborhood/Les Misrahi
- Treasuries of the Troll Museum
- Being a Supermodel is Cool
- Being Different is Cool
- Be Careful What You Wish For: A Coloring Book
- Beer is Magic
- Don't Call Me Rat-Dog!
- People Who Don't Like My Work Are Bad People: A Memoir
- Reverend Jen's Trip to the Hospital
- Reverend Jen Junior Groovee Paper Dolls
- Reverend Jen Paper Doll Fun

== Other releases ==
- Rev Jen's Greatest Hits – Spoken word album (audio cassette)
- "Don't Call Me Rat Dog" on the compilation album, Rachel Trachtenburg's Homemade World
