= Aeroperú Flight 603 =

1996 aviation accident in the Pacific Ocean

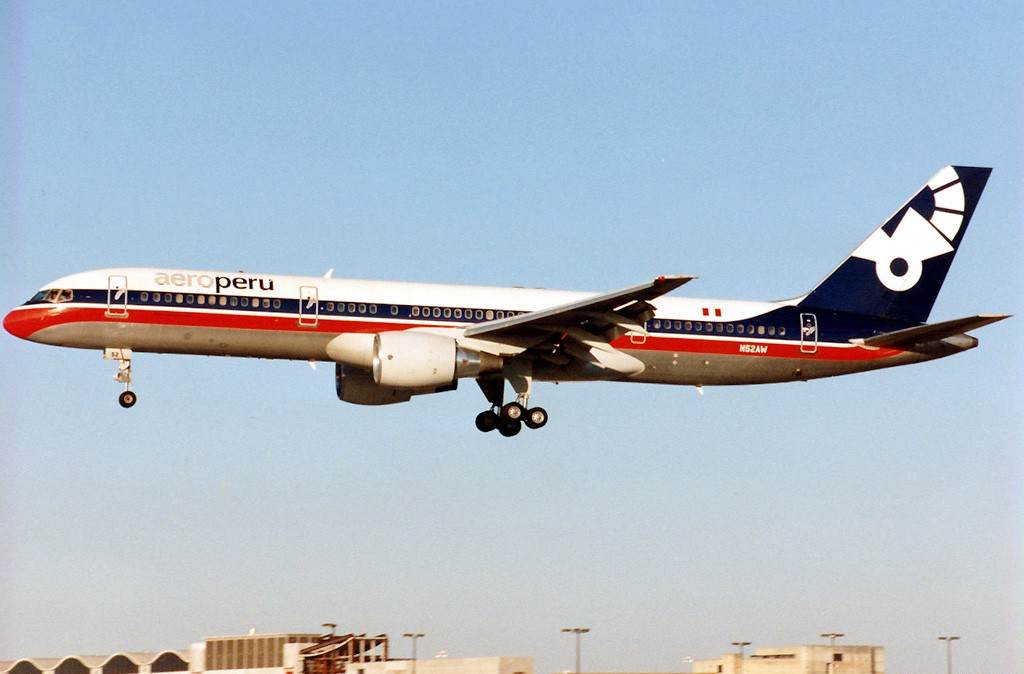
- N52AW, the aircraft involved in the accident, pictured in January 1996

Accident
- Date: October 2, 1996
- Summary: Controlled flight into water following instrument failure due to blocked static ports
- Site: Pacific Ocean, 55 miles (48 nmi; 89 km) northwest off Lima, Peru; 11°49′S 77°51′W

Aircraft
- Aircraft type: Boeing 757-23A
- Operator: Aeroperú
- IATA flight No.: PL603
- ICAO flight No.: PLI603
- Call sign: AEROPERU 603
- Registration: N52AW
- Flight origin: Miami International Airport; Miami, Florida, United States
- 1st stopover: Mariscal Sucre International Airport (former); Quito, Ecuador
- Last stopover: Jorge Chávez International Airport; Lima, Peru
- Destination: Arturo Merino Benítez International Airport; Santiago, Chile
- Occupants: 70
- Passengers: 61
- Crew: 9
- Fatalities: 70
- Survivors: 0

Aeroperú Flight 603 was a scheduled passenger flight from Miami International Airport in Miami, Florida, United States, to Arturo Merino Benítez International Airport in Santiago, Chile, with stopovers in Quito, Ecuador, and Lima, Peru. On October 2, 1996, the Boeing 757 aircraft flying the final leg of the flight crashed into the Pacific Ocean. All 70 people onboard were killed.

Flying over water, at night, with no visual references, the pilots were unaware of their true altitude, and struggled to control and navigate the aircraft. The investigation determined that the air data computers were unable to show correct airspeed and altitude on cockpit displays because a maintenance worker had failed to remove tape covering the pitot–static system ports on the aircraft exterior prior to departure.

== Background ==
=== Aircraft ===
The aircraft, a Boeing 757-23A, was delivered new on 2 December 1992, to leasing company Ansett Worldwide (AWAS). It was leased to Aeroméxico on 27 September 1993 and then sub-leased to Aeroperú on April 1, 1994. The lease transferred back to AWAS in February 1995, and Aeroperú continued to operate the aircraft until it crashed.

=== Crew ===
The captain was 58-year-old Eric Schreiber Ladrón de Guevara, who had logged almost 22,000 flight hours (including 1,520 hours on the Boeing 757). The first officer was 42-year-old David Fernández Revoredo, who had logged almost 8,000 flight hours, with 719 of them on the Boeing 757.

== Accident ==
On October 1, 1996, Aeroperú Flight 603 from Miami International Airport had landed at Jorge Chávez International Airport. There were 180 passengers on the first leg of the flight on a Boeing 757. Of those, 119 had exited the plane, and the remaining passengers were transferred to another Boeing 757. This aircraft took off 42 minutes after midnight (05:42 UTC) on October 2, and the crew immediately discovered that their basic flight instruments were behaving erratically, and reported receiving contradictory serial emergency messages from the flight management computer, including the altitude and airspeed indicator, rudder ratio, mach speed trim, overspeed, underspeed and flying too low. The crew declared an emergency and requested an immediate return to the airport.

The pilots incorrectly believed that they could figure out the actual aircraft altitude by asking the controller, but neither the pilots nor the controller realized that the altitude information displayed on the controller's screen was sent from the aircraft's Mode C Transponder. As the transponder was receiving the same erroneous altitude information being displayed on the aircraft's altimeter, the altitude on the controller's display was also incorrect.

Faced with a lack of reliable basic flight instrument readings, constant contradictory warnings from the aircraft's flight computer (some of which were valid and some were not) and believing that they were at a safe altitude, the crew decided to begin descent for the approach to the airport. Since the flight was at night over water, no visual references were available to convey to the pilots their true altitude or to aid their descent. As a consequence of the pilots' inability to precisely monitor the aircraft's airspeed or vertical speed, they experienced multiple stalls, resulting in rapid loss of altitude with no corresponding change on the altimeter. While the altimeter indicated an altitude of approximately 9,700 feet (3,000 m), the aircraft's true altitude was much lower, low enough that the ground proximity warning system began to send warnings; however, these warnings were not heeded due to the deluge of unreliable warnings.

The air traffic controller instructed a Boeing 707 to take off and to help guide the 757 in to land, but it was too late. The 757's left wingtip clipped the water approximately 25 minutes after the emergency declaration, tearing off part of the left wing. The pilots desperately clawed for altitude and managed to get the 757 airborne again for 19 seconds, but due to the damage to the left wing the aircraft rolled over and slammed into the water near-inverted. All 70 passengers and crew perished and the aircraft was completely destroyed.

== Passengers ==
About half of the passengers on the flight were Chileans returning to Chile.

| Nation | Number |
|---|---|
| Chile | 30 |
| Colombia | 1 |
| Ecuador | 2 |
| Italy | 2 |
| Mexico | 6 |
| New Zealand | 1 |
| Peru (Note: 11 passengers and 9 crew) | 20 |
| Spain | 1 |
| United Kingdom | 2 |
| United States | 4 |
| Venezuela | 1 |
| Total | 70 |

Of the passengers, 21 originated from Miami; all of the originating passengers were Chilean. An additional 10 passengers had boarded in Quito. The remaining passengers had boarded in Lima. After the crash, recovery crews found nine bodies floating, but 61 bodies had sunk with the aircraft.

== Investigation ==
The Commission of Accident Investigations (CAI) of the Director General of Air Transport (DGAT) of Peru wrote the final accident report.

The chief Peruvian accident investigator, Guido Fernández Lañas, was the uncle of the co-pilot, David Fernández. There were some reservations about the potential conflict of interest, but the National Transportation Safety Board-appointed investigator, Richard Rodriguez, determined that Fernández Lañas could properly investigate the accident.

The Peruvian Navy collected the floating wreckage. After the Peruvian authorities asked for assistance, the United States Navy provided equipment to locate the underwater wreckage of the Boeing 757 and retrieve its flight data recorder and cockpit voice recorder.

Later investigation into the accident revealed that adhesive tape had been accidentally left over some or all of the static ports (on the underside of the fuselage) after the aircraft was cleaned and polished, eventually leading to the crash. Employee Eleuterio Chacaliaza had left the tape on by mistake.

The static ports are vital to the operation of virtually all of those flight instruments that provide basic aerodynamic data, such as airspeed, altitude and vertical speed, not only to the pilots but also to the aircraft's computers, which provide additional functions, such as warnings when flight characteristics approach dangerous levels. The blockage of all of the static ports is one of the few common-failure modes resulting in total failure of multiple basic flight instruments and, as such, is regarded as one of the most serious faults that can occur in avionics systems.

Boeing's design of the 757-200 did not incorporate a system of maintenance covers for the static ports. Such covers are commonly employed in aviation for blocking access to critical components when the aircraft is not in operation and are generally a bright color and carry flags (which may have "remove before flight" markings). Instead, Boeing designed the 757-200 to rely on a maintenance procedure that called for the use of adhesive tape to cover the ports.

As a result of the blocked static ports, the basic flight instruments relayed false airspeed, altitude and vertical speed data. Because the failure was not in any of the instruments, but rather in a common supporting system, thereby defeating redundancy, the erroneous altimeter data was also broadcast to air traffic control, which was attempting to provide the pilots with basic flight data. This led to extreme confusion in the cockpit as the pilots were provided with some data (altitude) which seemed to correlate correctly with instrument data (altimeter) while the other data provided by ATC (approximate airspeed) did not agree. Although the pilots were quite cognizant of the possibility that all of the flight instruments were providing inaccurate data, the design flaw resulted in a correlation between the altitude data given by ATC and that on the altimeter, which likely further compounded the confusion. Also contributing to their difficulty were the numerous cockpit alarms that the computer system generated, which conflicted both with each other and with the instruments. This destruction of the flight crew's ability to maintain situational awareness was revealed by the cockpit voice recorder transcript. That the flight took place at night and over water, thus not giving the pilots any visual references, was also identified as a major factor. The official accident report concluded that the flight crew, distracted by the conflicting warnings, did not heed the GPWS alarm activated by the radar altimeter reading after descending through 2,500 feet (760 m). Paradoxically, the radar altimeter was working correctly since it is independent of the other systems, even the blocked sensors that confused the on-board computer and, of course, the pressure altimeter as well.

== Legal settlement ==
Mike Eidson, an American attorney, represented 41 passengers and crew in a lawsuit contending that the aircraft's manufacturer, Boeing, bore responsibility for the disaster, as the company ought to have foreseen the misuse of its products. The suit was filed against Boeing in federal court in Miami in May 1997. According to the complaint, the flightdeck errors were caused by careless maintenance by Aeroperú and negligence and defective design by Boeing. Boeing argued that it was not at fault, and that responsibility for the accident lay with the employee who did not remove the tape from the static ports, and the aircraft's pilot for not noticing the tape still applied by visual check. Richard Rodriguez of the NTSB said that it was understandable that Schreiber did not find the tape because the maintenance worker had used duct tape instead of the brightly colored tape that he was supposed to use. In addition, Rodriguez said that the pitot-static ports were high above the ground, meaning that Schreiber could not have seen the tape against the fuselage. After extensive litigation, the parties agreed to transfer the case against Boeing and Aeroperú to an international arbitration in Santiago, for a determination of the damages. The defendants agreed to not contest liability in Chile.

On December 13, 1999, family members of the flight's passengers received one of the largest compensations stemming from an aviation accident outside the United States aboard a non-U.S. carrier, averaging nearly $1 million per victim. Mayday stated that the manner of the crash resulting in the passengers' drowning was responsible for the large settlements.

== Criminal prosecution ==
Chacaliaza was convicted in Peru for negligent homicide and given a two-year suspended sentence in 1998. Four other defendants were acquitted. Chacaliaza said he would appeal the ruling, claiming that sabotage brought down the plane and that he had removed the adhesive tape.

Peruvian air accident investigator Guido Fernández criticized the ruling, stating that the maintenance worker was relatively uneducated and had little understanding of what he did. Fernández argued that his supervisors bore more responsibility, yet Chacaliaza was the one prosecuted by the system.

== Aftermath ==
After the accident, Aeroperú changed the number of its evening Miami-Lima-Santiago Boeing 757 service to Flight 691.

== In popular culture ==
- The events of Flight 603 were featured in "Flying Blind", a season 1 (2003) episode of the Canadian TV series Mayday, repackaged as Air Disasters, for which it was season 18, episode 10, first broadcast on February 5, 2023. The flight was also included in a Mayday Season 6 (2007) Science of Disaster special titled "Who's Flying the Plane?". In 2026, Mayday had done an all-new cast and CGI re-run of Flight 603, premiering in the Season 26 episode "Deadly Cover Up" of the Canadian TV series.
- In 1999, the cockpit voice recorder (CVR) of the incident was incorporated into the script of the play Charlie Victor Romeo produced by the Collective:Unconscious theater company in New York. In 2013 a film version of the play was released.

== See also ==
- Pitot–static system

=== Similar events ===
- Air India Flight 855
- Birgenair Flight 301, which also took place in 1996 and also involved a 757-200, with similar circumstances
- Air France Flight 447
- Adam Air Flight 574
- Lion Air Flight 610
- Ethiopian Airlines Flight 302
- Indonesia AirAsia Flight 8501
- West Air Sweden Flight 294
- Turkish Airlines Flight 5904
