= Todo con Nada =

American Off-Off-Broadway theater company

Todo Con Nada
- Formation: January 1, 1988
- Dissolved: November 10, 2000
- Type: Theatre group
- Location: 167 Ludlow St, New York, NY 10002
- Artistic director: Camden Toy
- Award: Obie Award

Todo con Nada (also known as NADA) was an Obie Award winning Off-Off-Broadway theatre company, founded in 1988 by Aaron Beall, Tim Carryer, and Babs Bailey in a small storefront on Ludlow Street in New York City's East Village. After twelve years of continuous operation, the theatre permanently shuttered in 2000.

== History ==
Established in 1988 by Aaron Beall, Tim Carryer, and Babs Bailey as "Theater Club Funambules" in a modest venue on Ludlow Street in New York’s East Village, the company underwent significant changes after Carryer and Bailey left in 1991. Beall subsequently rebranded both the company and the venue as "Todo con Nada," or simply, "NADA." In addition to the Ludlow Street space, NADA ran two other venues in Midtown Manhattan: "NADA 45" on 45th Street and "NADA Show World," located in a former strip club near the Port Authority Bus Terminal.

Many noteworthy artists of the downtown arts scene received their start at NADA. Target Margin Theater had its first major success at NADA with a reimagining of William Shakespeare's Titus Andronicus, as did Elevator Repair Service and The Neo-Futurists, now both staples of the avant-garde theatre scene. NADA was also home to the early work of many noteworthy American playwrights, including Kirk Wood Bromley, Todd Alcott, Brian Parks, and Honor Molloy. Obie Award winning actor James Urbaniak regularly performed there, as did performance artists Deb Margolin, Sally Greenhouse and John Leguizamo.

Over the years, NADA became known for its ambitious festivals, featuring works by playwrights like Richard Foreman and Charles Ludlam, as well as inventive adaptations of classics such as William Shakespeare's Hamlet and Johann Wolfgang von Goethe's Faust.

In November of 2000, the company was evicted from its original space due to unpaid rent. Archival materials related to NADA including newspaper clippings, flyers, postcards, and various documents chronicling the company's history and productions are housed at the New York Public Library.

== Notable productions ==
- The Nino Nada Theater Festival for Children (1999)
- God of Vengeance by Sholem Asch and Carolyn Cantor (1998)
- "No Strings Attached, Part Two: Mind Attack!" Richard Foreman Festival (1998)
- "No String Attached," Richard Foreman Festival (1997)
- Jobey And Katherine by Greg Kotis (1997)
- "Toddfest" Todd Alcott Festival (1996)
- Want's Unwisht Work by Kirk Wood Bromley (1996)
- Wolverine Dream by Brian Parks(1996)
- Vomit and Roses by Brian Parks (1995)
- Cymbeline by William Shakespeare (1995)
- The Nutcracker by Douglas Langworthy and David Herskovits (1995)
- Hamlet by William Shakespeare (1993)
- Molloy by Honor Molloy (1993)
- LCD-TV by Elisa DeCarlo (1992)
- Titus Andronicus by William Shakespeare (1991)
