= Collective:Unconscious =

Performing and visual arts nonprofit

Collective:Unconscious Corporation
- Founded: 1994
- Type: Performing arts collective
- Purpose: Performing and visual arts
- Location: New York City, U.S.
- Origins: Lower East Side, New York City, U.S.
- Region served: New York City, U.S.
- Members: 8-15 (typical)
- Endowment: Lower Manhattan Cultural Council, private donors

Collective:Unconscious is a non-profit (501(c)(3)) corporation, founded in New York City in 1993, and incorporated in 1995. Originally based on Avenue B in Alphabet City, it moved to 145 Ludlow Street on Manhattan's Lower East Side; in 2004 it relocated to Tribeca until July 2008.

Collective:Unconscious has had a notable effect on New York City's downtown culture, society, and entertainment, and has been recognized in the way of financial support by the Lower Manhattan Cultural Council, the New York Department of Cultural Affairs, partial support from a 2001 Absolut Angel grant for art and technology, and a formal permanent position in the New York University Elmer Holmes Bobst Library special Fales Library Downtown Collection.

A nearby performance art space in the East Village was known as Gargoyle Mechanique (Laboratory), Collective: Unconscious, and Unconscious Collective, and while some overlap between these organizations exists, they have no official affiliation with Collective:Unconscious or Collective:Unconscious Corporation.

== History ==
Collective: Unconscious started when a group of performance and visual artists took over the lease at 28 Avenue B from the performance group Gargoyle Mechanique Laboratory in 1991. Miklos Legrady, Caterina Bartha, Patrick Daniels, Jamie Mereness, Mark Sonderskov, Bob Berger and Dan Green formed the original Board of Directors. The logo was created by remaining Gargoyle-era resident Legrady, while the performance philosophy behind the group came from new residents Green, Berger, Sonderskov, and Daniels, as well as Mereness, who lived in the West Village.

The space consisted of a storefront theatre capable of seating 75, with living spaces for members in the back and basement. In 1994 a fire destroyed the space. The Collective members moved to Ludlow Street and reorganized as the Collective:Unconscious Theater.

Collective:Unconscious produced hundreds of performances through the 1990s and 2000s at its own facility as well as other locations. Collective's artists and associated groups have mounted works at Collective's home facilities, the Knitting Factory, the BWAC festival at Red Hook, P.S. 122, Exit Art, Clemente Soto Velez Cultural Center, Theater for the New City, La Plaza Cultural and the Sixth Street/Avenue B Garden, as well as touring internationally with the play Charlie Victor Romeo. Collective:Unconscious also founded its own unofficial parade, the annual July 4 Monster Parade and in conjunction with sub-group IFAM, won several Coney Island Mermaid Parade contests in the Sea Monster category (see photo, left). Collective:Unconscious artists have participated in several festivals, on and off site, including the New York International Fringe Festival, Underground Zero Festival, "The Robert Beck Memorial Cinema," and the Downtown Arts Festival.

== Theaters ==
=== Lower East Side theater ===
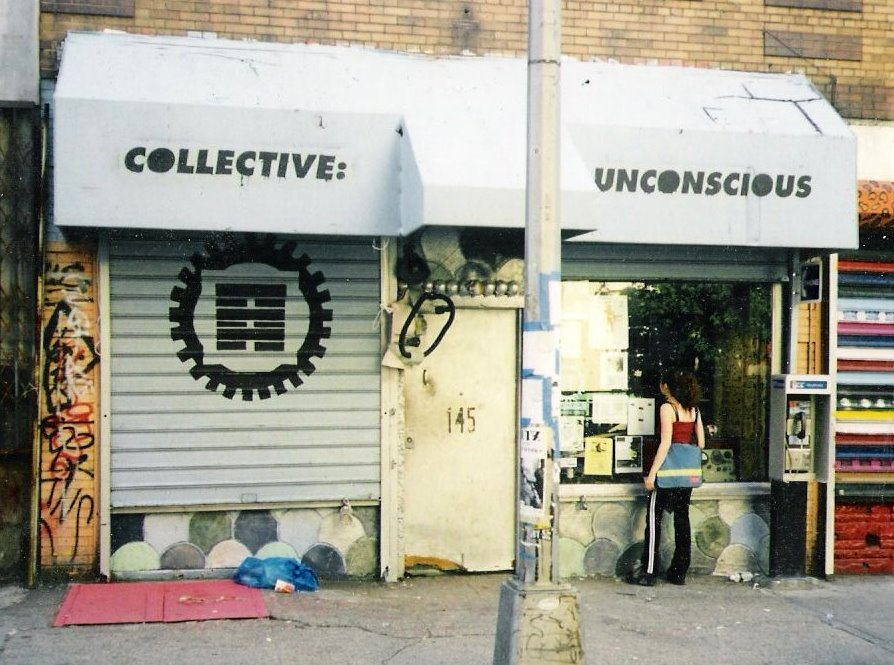
Lower East Side theater

Collective:Unconscious Theater was officially established in a condemned brothel previously known as "Cucho Tailor" on Ludlow Street between Stanton Street and Rivington Street on the Lower East Side of New York City in 1994. In recognition of its sordid history, the first open performance in the space was also named "Cucho Tailor". Thousands of performances followed until 2004. In addition to hosting a number of unique series such as Reverend Jen's Anti-Slam and Faceboy'z Open Mic, Collective:Unconscious has also hosted several festivals, including the New York International Fringe Festival, the Downtown Arts Festival, and the New York Lower East Side Film Festival. The Collective at Ludlow Street shared a place in New York's off-off-Broadway and performance art theater history, along with fellow performance spaces in the neighborhood such as Surf Reality, Todo Con Nada (NADA), Gargoyle Mechanique, The Present Company, House of Candles, and Pianos (Theater). It was noted as "entry-level Bohemia and thoroughly casual" by The New York Times.

The Collective seated approximately 75 people in the main floor, and occasionally opened areas on the second floor and in the basement for special events, such as the annual "Auto-Historical Event" anniversary performance. As a commercial space Collective:Unconscious faced repeated increases in rent over the decade, which ultimately drove the Collective theater (as well as Surf Reality, The Present Company, House of Candles, and Todo Con Nada, among others) from the Lower East Side. The Collective:Unconscious theater was vacated in 2004, and subsequently demolished, and is now a typical Lower East Side condominium.

=== Tribeca theater ===
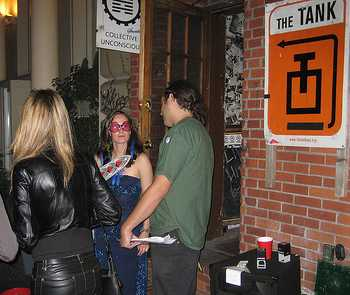
Outside Collective:Unconscious Theater - Tribeca

Collective:Unconscious moved to its Tribeca location in 2004, and launched new initiatives with the theatrical group The Tank, theater-burlesque innovators Pinchbottom featuring Jonny Porkpie and Nasty Canasta, the annual Underground Zero festival, the New York International Fringe Festival, Shifting Ambition Theater's No Alarms (Headfullofradio), and many others. Among the headliners were Karen Finley and Neal Medlyn, Mike Daisey, Annie Sprinkle ('Exposed: Experiments in Love, Sex, Death and Art'), and East River Commedia.

In July 2008, the Tribeca facility had to be abandoned due to a sewage situation.

== Gallery ==
Collective:Unconscious, 1999, on New York's Lower East Side, featuring a monster robot.

== See also ==
- Surf Reality
- ABC No Rio
- Art Stars
- Performance Space 122
- Upright Citizens Brigade
- Pinchbottom Burlesque
