= John Clancy (playwright) =

American playwright, novelist and director

John Clancy is an American playwright, novelist, and director. He was a co-founder and first artistic director of the New York International Fringe Festival and its producing organization The Present Company.

== Career ==
John Clancy's written work centers mainly on the American experience, and is characterized by dark humor and farce. His best-known play is Fatboy: An American Grotesque, a modern re-working of Alfred Jarry's Ubu Roi. His monologue The Event premiered in Edinburgh in 2009 and has gone on to tour Germany, the Netherlands, Australia and the United States and has been translated into Greek and German.

Clancy's directing has earned six Fringe First Awards (Edinburgh Festival Fringe) and two Best of Fringe Awards (Adelaide Fringe Festival). He was awarded a 2005 Obie Award for Sustained Excellence of Direction, a 2002 Glasgow Herald Angel Award for Excellence in Direction, a 1997 New York Magazine Award, and a 2008 Dialogue ONE Award for Outstanding Contribution to Theatre.

He served as executive director of The League of Independent Theater, New York City's only 501(c)6 advocacy organization for the independent theater territory and board president of The Independent Theater Fund, a charitable foundation formed to sustain and strengthen the artists, companies, venues and practitioners of independent theater in New York City.

He is currently the President of Little Pharaoh Enterprises, an arts consultancy firm focusing on celebrating the art and heritage of the area known as Little Egypt in southern Illinois.

== Personal life ==
Clancy lives in Mt. Carmel, IL with his wife Nancy Walsh. He is the owner of the Little Egypt Arts Center, which is dedicated to local artwork, and also has a performance space to let local artists perform. In the future, there will also be a cafe that has more space for local art called Oasis.

== List of authored plays, monologues and other work ==
- Fatboy
- The Event
- Captain Overlord's Folly
- When You Join Us
- The True Tragedy of Salome
- The Piano Store Plays
- The Apocalyptic Road Show
- Secret Agent Man
- Paper Man
- Notice of Default and Opportunity to Cure
- The Fire Sermon
- The Broccoli Incident
- Another Beautiful Story
- Postmen (teleplay)
- Good Credit (screenplay)

=== Novels ===
- St.Lincoln, IL pop. Infinity

=== Short stories ===
- Ruined Beauty and Other Stories

=== Memoirs ===
- Happiness on the Hard Road

== See also ==
- Off-Off-Broadway
