= Pinchbottom Burlesque =

Theatrical burlesque company

Pinchbottom is a theatrical burlesque company created by Jonny Porkpie and Nasty Canasta in 2004 and run by Porkpie since 2010. It is known for its brand of "theater-burlesque fusion" which presents "full-length comedic play[s] in which performers take their clothes off in every other scene.".

== Awards ==
The company was awarded the first-ever "Most Innovative" trophy for their performance at The Burlesque Hall of Fame in 2007, and named the "Best Burlesque" in New York by New York Magazine in 2007.

== Productions ==
=== Major productions ===
Title	Venue	Date
A Day on the Boardwalk, A Night at the Stripshow	Coney Island USA	8/09, 8/10, 5/24
Filthy Lucre: A Burlesque Christmas Carol	Walkerspace	12/09
	The Laurie Beechman Theater	12/23
	Lips NYC	12/24
The Pinch Brothers in "The Bawdy House"	Collective:Unconscious	4/07, 5/08
	45 Bleecker	3/09
	The Players Theatre as part of MarxFest	May 2014
Pretençión: un cirque du burlesque, un burlesque du cirque	Spiegelworld	9/08, 10/08
	Performance Space 122	7/09
	Coney Island USA	8/12
	Hudson Theater, Los Angeles	1/13
	The Elektra Theater, NYC	3/13-6/13
Naked Planet Sci-Fi Burlesque	Collective:Unconscious	5/06, 11/07
	Coney Island USA	7/13
Pinchbottom Declares War	Collective:Unconscious	2/07
	The Flea Theater	7/08

=== Additional productions ===
Title	Theme	Venue	Date
Cold War Burlesque		Siberia	7/2004
Burlesque Goes to the Movies	Film	Galapagos Artspace	2005
Blasphemy	Religion	Collective:Unconscious	4/2006
		The Women's Project	4/07
My Biggest Fan	Fan Dances	Collective:Unconscious	6/06
Pinchbottom's Drinking Problem	Alcohol	Collective:Unconscious	7/06
Pow! Zap! Boob!	Superhero	Collective:Unconscious	8/06, 6/07
Eat Me	A Burlesque Cooking Show	Collective:Unconscious	9/06
Slumber Party in Pink		Collective:Unconscious	10/06, 3/08
You Only Pinch Twice	007 Burlesque	Collective:Unconscious	11/06
		The Zipper Theater	11/08
		The Kraine Theater	11/12
Creeping Xmas Death		Collective:Unconscious	12/06
Film Strip	The Academy Awards	Collective:Unconscious	1/07
Who Killed Jo Boobs		Collective:Unconscious	3/07
...And The Horse You Rode In On	Wild West Burlesque	Collective:Unconscious	5/07
Bottoms Over Broadway		Collective:Unconscious	7/07
Burlesque For Kids (Not For Kids)		Collective:Unconscious	8/07
Pinchbottomland Amusement Park		Coney Island USA	9/07
P.I.N.C.H. Squad	70s Cop Shows	Collective:Unconscious	9/07
		45 Bleecker	6/09
Balls!	Sports	Collective:Unconscious	10/07, 5/08
How The Pinch Stole Xmas		Collective:Unconscious	12/07
		Union Hall	12/08
		The Kraine Theater	12/09
How To Sex (A Do-It-Yourself Guide)	Sex	Collective:Unconscious	2/08
The Boob Job	A Burlesque Heist	Collective:Unconscious	4/08
Raiders of the Temple of the Golden Boobs of Doom Crusade	Indiana Jones	Collective:Unconscious	6/08
Devilish		Corio	7/08-8/08
Murder Most Naked	Mystery	45 Bleecker	1/09
So You Think You Can Pinch America's Next Top Bottom of Talent	Reality TV	45 Bleecker	2/09
Pinch U.	College	45 Bleecker	4/09
The Morning After	Post-Apocalyptic Burlesque	45 Bleecker	5/09
Lurid Pulp	Dime Novels	45 Bleecker	11/09
The Last Burlesque Show in the World		Performance Space 122	7/10
