= Brian Parks =

American dramatist

Brian Parks (born c. 1962) is an American playwright, journalist and editor. He is a former Arts & Culture editor of The Village Voice and former chairman of its Obie Awards.

As a playwright, Parks has produced works that are noted for their dark comedy and fast pace. Best known for his play Americana Absurdum (which consists of two shorter plays, Vomit & Roses and Wolverine Dream), his other works include Goner, Suspicious Package, Out of the Way, The Invitation (titled Einladung zum Abendessen in the German-language version, translated by John and Peter von Duffel), Imperial Fizz, and The Professor.

Americana Absurdum was honored with the “Best Writing” award at the 1997 New York International Fringe Festival and a Scotsman Fringe First Award at the 2000 Edinburgh Festival Fringe. It was also produced in London in 2004 at the Menier Chocolate Factory Theater. In 2019 The Scotsman called Parks "one of the great absurdists of Fringe theatre".

== Education ==
Parks graduated from Brother Rice High School in Bloomfield Township, Michigan, in 1980. He attended Brown University, then Brooklyn College, where he was awarded an MFA in playwriting.
