= Surf Reality =

Former performance venue in Manhattan

- Surf Reality's House of Urban Savages
- Interactive map of Surf Reality
- Address: 172 Allen Street, Lower East Side; New York City; USA
- Coordinates: 40.7214°N 73.9890°W
- Owner: Robert Prichard
- Capacity: 65
- Type: Performance Art Theater
- Current use: yoga studio

Construction
- Opened: 1993
- Closed: 2003

Website
- www.surfreality.com

Surf Reality's House of Urban Savages, also known as Surf Reality, was a 65-seat performance venue on Manhattan's Lower East Side from 1993 to 2003. A laboratory for experimental performance of all kinds, Surf Reality was known for comedy, performance art, classic burlesque, modern music, vaudeville and experimental theater.

The theater also served as the home for Faceboyz Open Mic. Other acts that passed through Surf include The Upright Citizens Brigade, Todd Barry, Dave Chappelle, Maggie Estep, and Jonathan Ames. Surf Reality was noted as a venue for "alternative comedy, along with performance art and theater pieces" where "visitors have to be buzzed in through its scrap-metal door and climb up to a loftlike second-floor space" by The New York Times.

== External references ==
- Surf Reality website
- 1996 NY Times article about Surf Reality and Alternative Comedy
- 2003 Village Voice article about the closing of Surf Reality
- Tom Tenney: Surf Reality resident producer and sound artist for 64 Paintings/64 Plays

== See also ==
- Collective:Unconscious
- Queens Bridge Theater
