= Flight recorder =

Robust aircraft electronic recording device

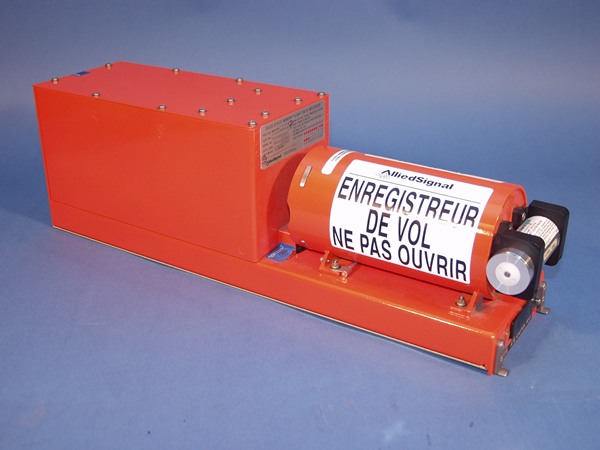
A modern flight data recorder; the underwater locator beacon is the small cylinder on the far right. (Translation of warning message in French: "Flight recorder do not open".) The warning appears in English on the other side.

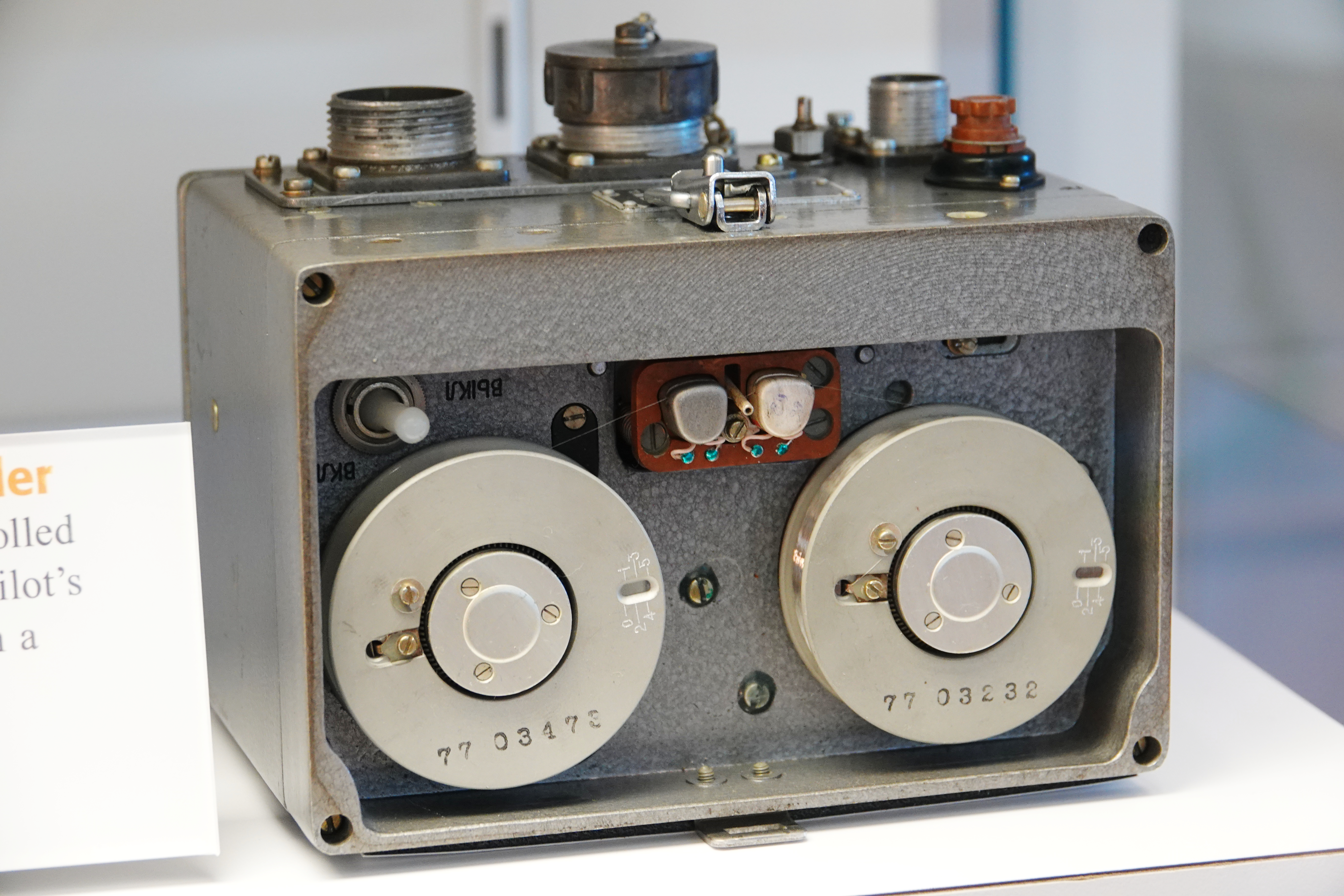
Cold War-era Soviet MS-61 cockpit voice recorder from a MiG-21 interceptor

A flight recorder is an electronic recording device placed in an aircraft for the purpose of facilitating the investigation of aviation accidents and incidents. The device may be referred to colloquially as a "black box", an outdated name which has become a misnomer because they are required to be painted bright orange, to aid in their recovery after accidents.

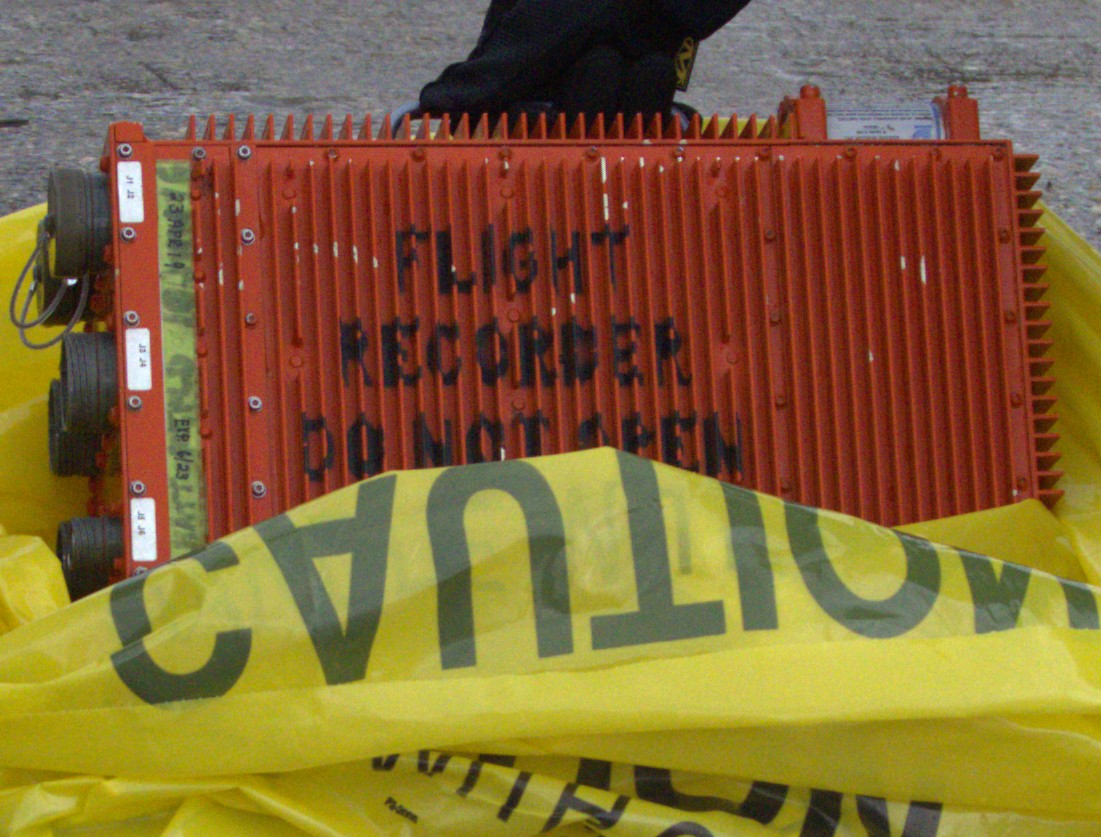
Flight data recorder recovered from the Potomac River on 2 February 2025, from one of the aircraft involved in the 2025 Potomac River mid-air collision.

There are two types of flight recording devices: the flight data recorder (FDR) preserves the recent history of the flight by recording dozens of parameters collected several times per second; the cockpit voice recorder (CVR) preserves the recent history of the sounds in the cockpit, including the conversation of the pilots. The two devices may be combined into a single unit. Together, the FDR and CVR document the aircraft's flight history, which may assist in any later investigation.

The two flight recorders are required by the International Civil Aviation Organization to be capable of surviving conditions likely to be encountered in a severe aircraft accident. They are specified to withstand an impact of 3400 g and temperatures of over 1,000 °C (1,830 °F) by EUROCAE ED-112. They have been a mandatory requirement in commercial aircraft in the United States since 1967. After the unexplained disappearance of Malaysia Airlines Flight 370 in 2014, commentators have called for live streaming of data to the ground, as well as extending the battery life of the underwater locator beacons.

== History ==
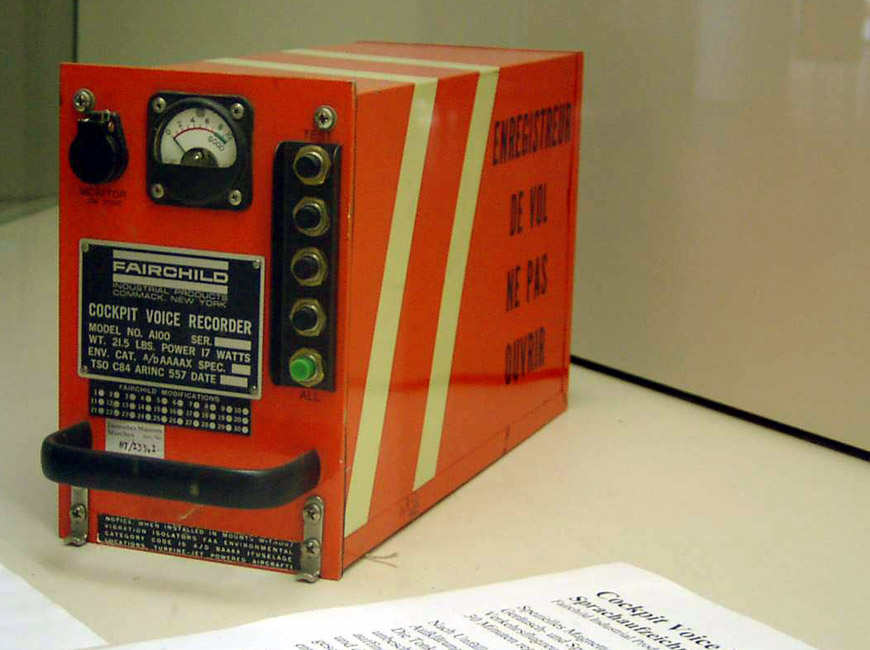
A Fairchild A100 cockpit voice recorder, on display in the Deutsches Museum. This is a magnetic-tape unit built to an old standard, TSO C84, as shown on the nameplate. The text on the side in French says "Flight recorder do not open".

=== Early designs ===
One of the earliest and proven attempts was made by François Hussenot and Paul Beaudouin in 1939 at the Marignane flight test center, France, with their "type HB" flight recorder; they were essentially photograph-based flight recorders, because the record was made on a scrolling photographic film 8 metres (8.7 yd) long by 88 millimetres (3.5 in) wide. The latent image was made by a thin ray of light deviated by a mirror tilted according to the magnitude of the data to be recorded (altitude, speed, etc.). A pre-production run of 25 "HB" recorders was ordered in 1941, and HB recorders remained in use in French flight test centers well into the 1970s.

In 1947, Hussenot founded the Société Française des Instruments de Mesure with Beaudouin and another associate, so as to market his invention, which was also known as the "hussenograph". This company went on to become a major supplier of data recorders, used not only aboard aircraft but also trains and other vehicles. SFIM is today part of the Safran group and is still present in the flight recorder market. The advantage of the film technology was that it could be easily developed afterwards and provides a durable, visual feedback of the flight parameters without needing any playback device. On the other hand, unlike magnetic tapes or later flash memory-based technology, a photographic film cannot be erased and reused, and so must be changed periodically. The technology was reserved for one-shot uses, mostly during planned test flights: it was not mounted aboard civilian aircraft during routine commercial flights. Also, cockpit conversation was not recorded.

Another form of flight data recorder was developed in the UK during World War II. Len Harrison and Vic Husband developed a unit that could withstand a crash and fire to keep the flight data intact. The unit was the forerunner of today's recorders, in being able to withstand conditions that aircrew could not. It used copper foil as the recording medium, with various styli, corresponding to various instruments or aircraft controls, indenting the foil. The foil was periodically advanced at set time intervals, giving a history of the aircraft's instrument readings and control settings. The unit was developed at Farnborough for the Ministry of Aircraft Production. At the war's end, the Ministry got Harrison and Husband to sign over their invention to it and the Ministry patented it under British patent 19330/45.

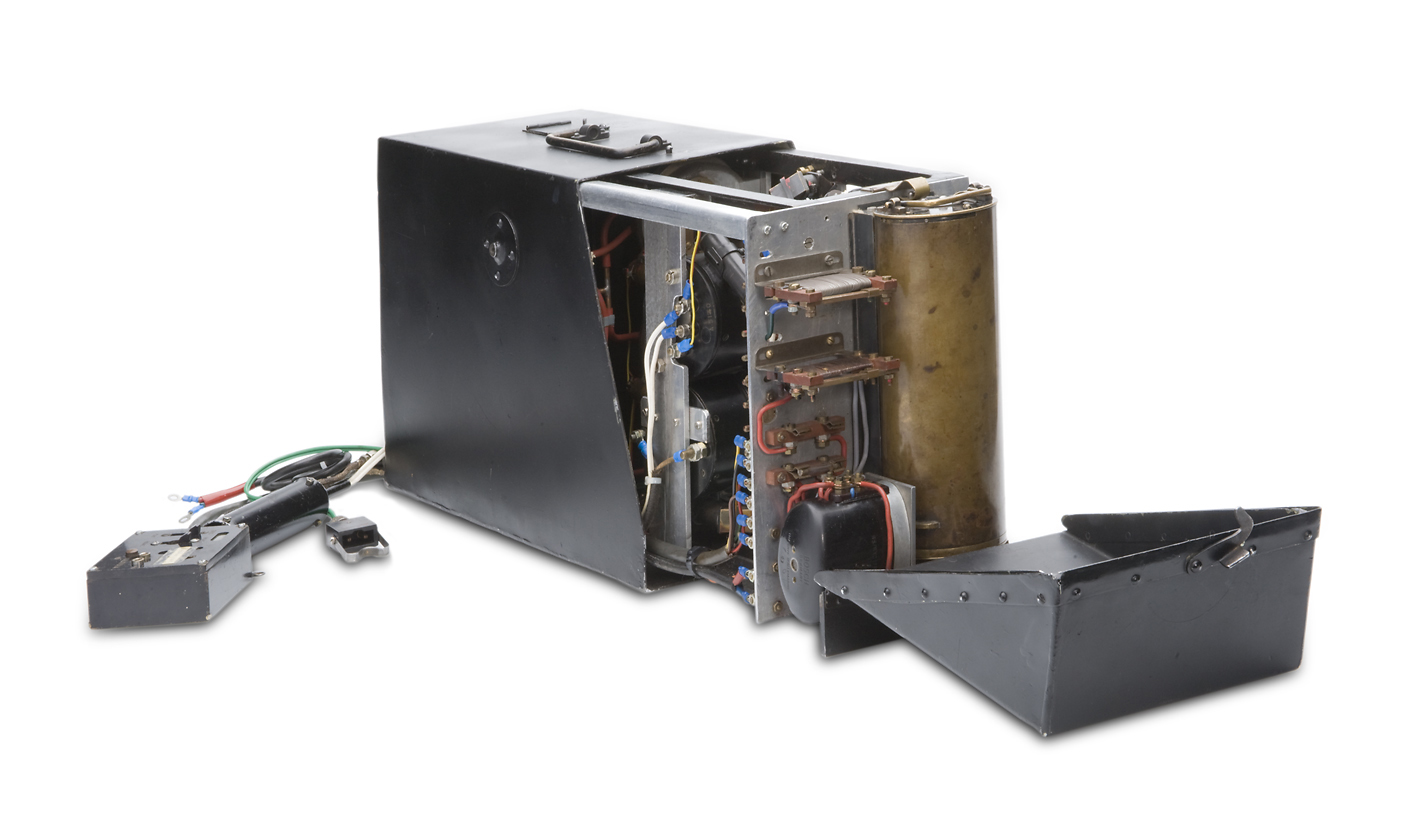
"Mata-Hari" Finnish Air Force flight data recorder, 1942

The first modern flight data recorder, called "Mata-Hari", named after the famous spy, was created in 1942 by Finnish aviation engineer Veijo Hietala. This black high-tech mechanical box was able to record all required data during test flights of fighter aircraft that the Finnish Air Force repaired or built in its main aviation factory in Tampere, Finland.

During World War II, both British and American air forces successfully experimented with aircraft voice recorders. In August 1943, the USAAF conducted an experiment with a magnetic wire recorder to capture the inter-phone conversations of a B-17 bomber flight crew on a combat mission over Nazi-occupied France. The recording was broadcast back to the United States by radio two days afterwards.

=== Australian designs ===
Video clip of 1985 ABC News report interviewing David Warren about his invention

In 1953, while working at the Aeronautical Research Laboratories (ARL) of the Defence Science and Technology Organisation in Port Melbourne, Australian research scientist David Warren conceived a device that would record not only the instrument readings, but also the voices in the cockpit. In 1954 he published a report entitled "A Device for Assisting Investigation into Aircraft Accidents".

Warren built a prototype FDR called "The ARL Flight Memory Unit" in 1956, and in 1958 he built the first combined FDR/CVR prototype. It was designed with civilian aircraft in mind, explicitly for post-crash examination purposes. Aviation authorities from around the world were largely uninterested at first, but this changed in 1958 when Sir Robert Hardingham, the secretary of the British Air Registration Board, visited the ARL and was introduced to David Warren. Hardingham realized the significance of the invention and arranged for Warren to demonstrate the prototype in the UK.

The ARL assigned an engineering team to help Warren develop the prototype to the airborne stage. The team, consisting of electronics engineers Lane Sear, Wally Boswell, and Ken Fraser, developed a working design that incorporated a fire-resistant and shockproof case, a reliable system for encoding and recording aircraft instrument readings and voice on one wire, and a ground-based decoding device. The ARL system, made by the British firm of S. Davall & Sons Ltd, in Middlesex, was named the "Red Egg" because of its shape and bright red color.

The units were redesigned in 1965 and relocated at the rear of aircraft to increase the probability of successful data retrieval after a crash.

Carriage of data recording equipment became mandatory in UK-registered aircraft in two phases; the first, for new turbine-engined public transport category aircraft over 12,000 lb (5,400 kg) in weight, was mandated in 1965, with a further requirement in 1966 for piston-engined transports over 60,000 lb (27,000 kg), with the earlier requirement further extended to all jet transports. One of the first UK uses of the data recovered from an aircraft accident was that recovered from the Royston "Midas" data recorder that was on board the British Midland Argonaut involved in the Stockport Air Disaster in 1967.

=== American designs ===
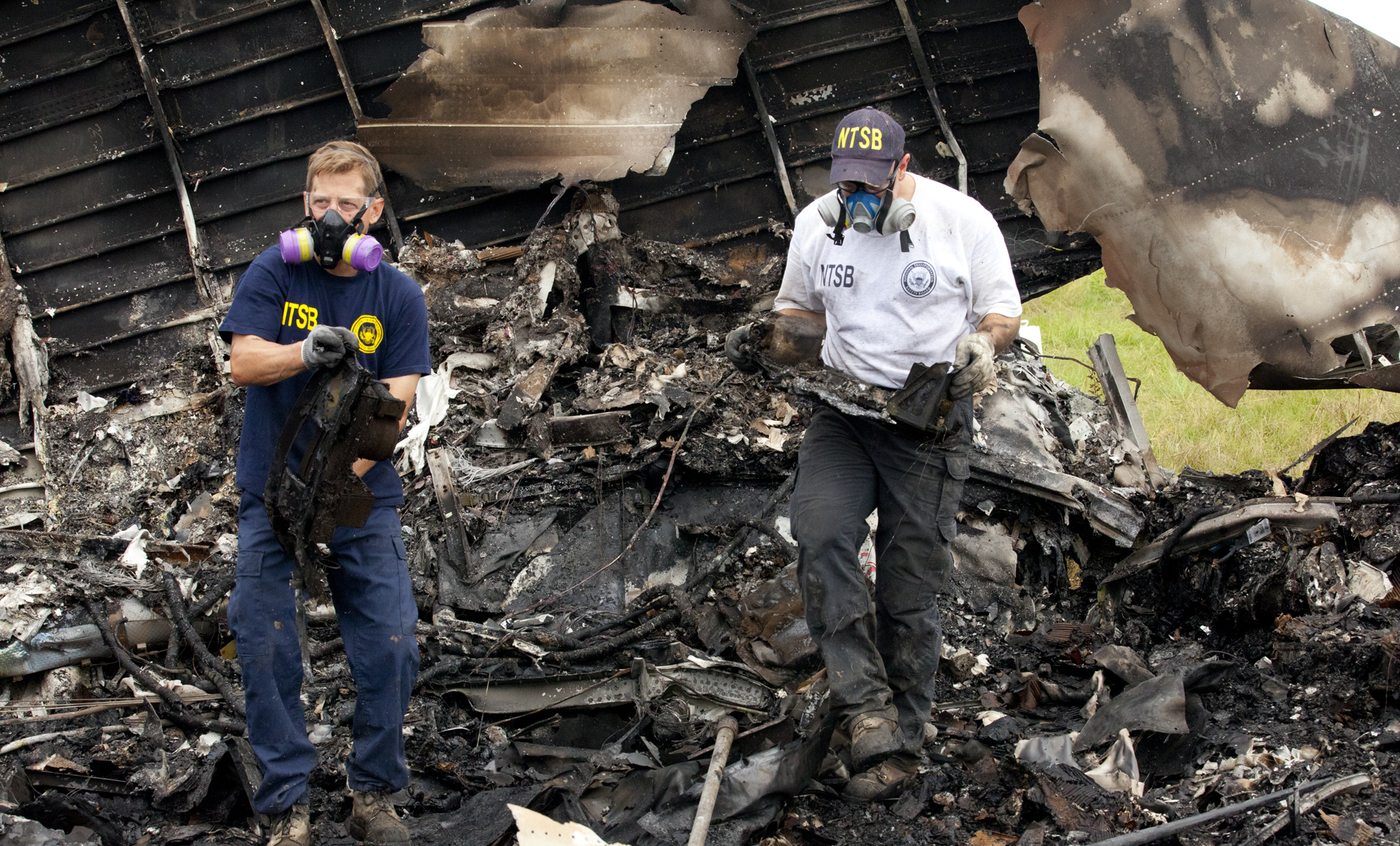
NTSB investigators recover flight data recorder and cockpit voice recorder from UPS Airlines Flight 1354

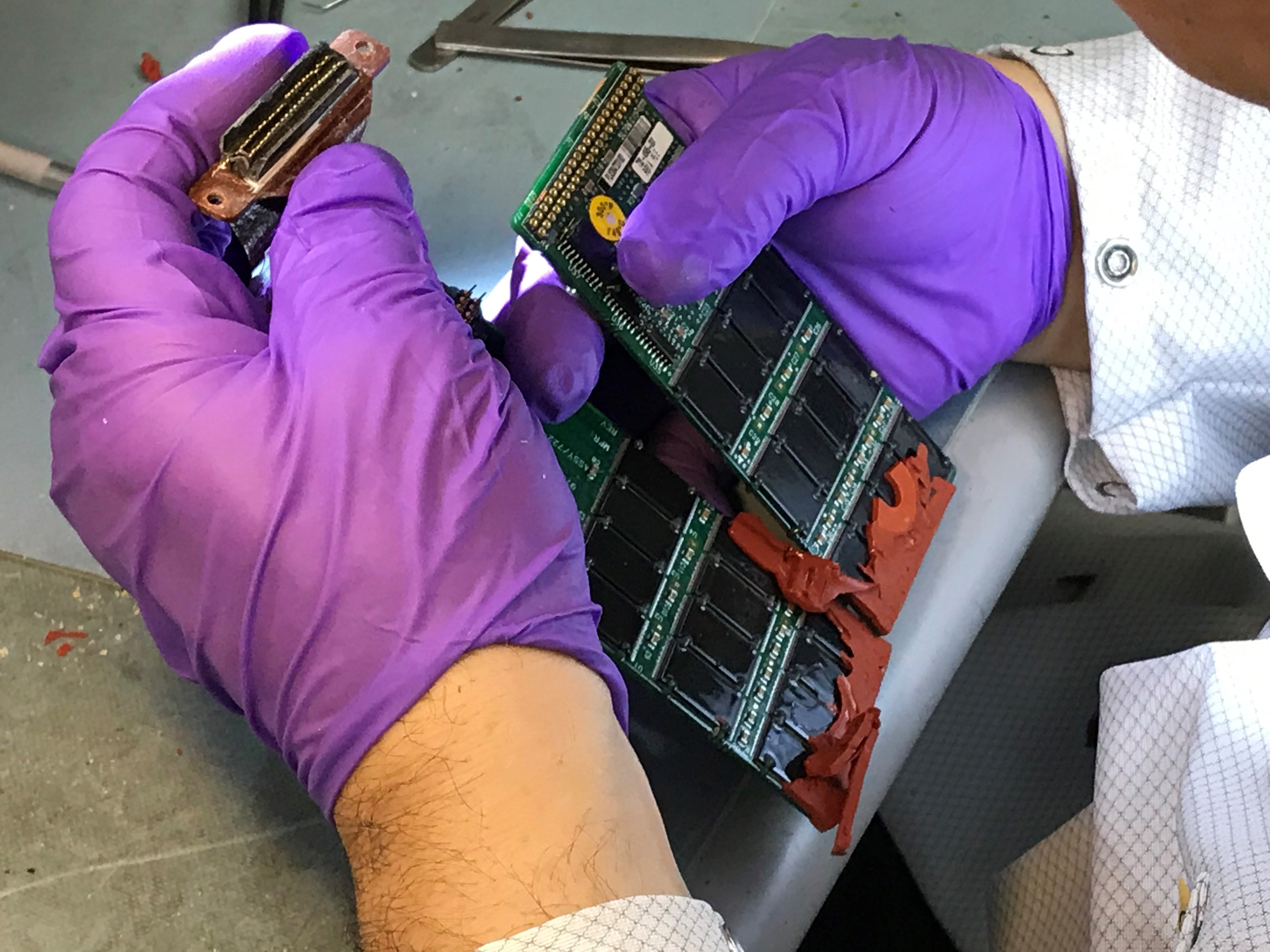
NTSB staff examine the memory boards of the cockpit voice recorder from Atlas Air Flight 3591. The boards may have suffered water damage.

A flight recorder was invented and patented in the United States by James J. Ryan. Ryan's "Flight Recorder" patent was filed in August 1953 and approved on November 8, 1960, as US Patent 2,959,459. A second patent by Ryan for a "Coding Apparatus For Flight Recorders" is US Patent 3,075,192 dated January 22, 1963.

A "Cockpit Sound Recorder" (CSR) was independently invented and patented by Edmund A. Boniface Jr., an aeronautical engineer at Lockheed Aircraft Corporation. He originally filed with the US Patent Office on February 2, 1961, as an "Aircraft Cockpit Sound Recorder". The 1961 invention was viewed by some as an "invasion of privacy". Subsequently, Boniface filed again on February 4, 1963, for a "Cockpit Sound Recorder" (US Patent 3,327,067) with the addition of a spring-loaded switch which allowed the pilot to erase the audio/sound tape recording at the conclusion of a safe flight and landing.

Boniface's participation in aircraft crash investigations in the 1940s and in the accident investigations of the loss of one of the wings at cruise altitude on each of two Lockheed Electra turboprop powered aircraft (Flight 542 operated by Braniff Airlines in 1959 and Flight 710 operated by Northwest Orient Airlines in 1961) led to his wondering what the pilots may have said just prior to the wing loss and during the descent as well as the type and nature of any sounds or explosions that may have preceded or occurred during the wing loss.

His patent was for a device for recording audio of pilot remarks and engine or other sounds to be "contained with the in-flight recorder within a sealed container that is shock mounted, fireproofed and made watertight" and "sealed in such a manner as to be capable of withstanding extreme temperatures during a crash fire". The CSR was an analog device which provided a continuous erasing/recording loop (lasting 30 or more minutes) of all sounds (explosion, voice, and the noise of any aircraft structural components undergoing serious fracture and breakage) which could be overheard in the cockpit.

On November 1, 1966, the director of the Bureau of Safety of the Civil Aeronautics Board Bobbie R. Allen and the chief of Technical Services Section John S. Leak presented "The Potential Role of Flight Recorders in Aircraft Accident Investigation" at the AIAA/CASI Joint Meeting on Aviation Safety, Toronto, Canada.

== Terminology ==
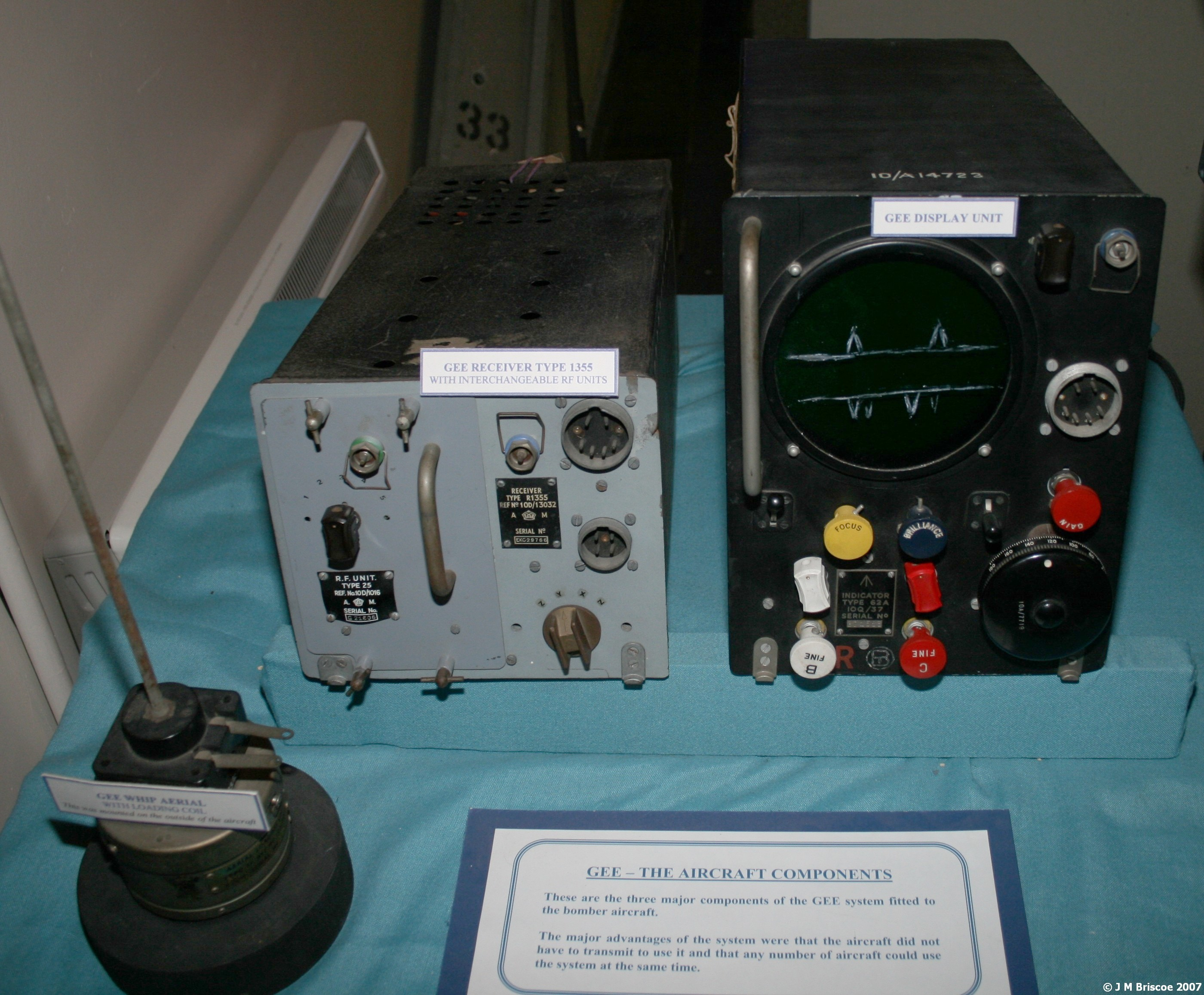
GEE airborne equipment, with the R1355 receiver on the left and the Indicator Unit Type 62A "black box" on the right.

The term "black box" was a World War II British phrase associated with the development of radio, radar, and electronic navigational aids in British and Allied military aircraft. These often-secret electronic devices were encased in non-reflective black boxes or housings. The earliest identified reference to "black boxes" occurs in a May 1946 Flight article, "Radar for Airlines", describing the application of wartime RAF radar and navigational aids to civilian aircraft: "The stowage of the 'black boxes' and, even more important, the detrimental effect on performance of external aerials, still remain as a radio and radar problem." (The term "black box" is used with a different meaning in science and engineering, describing a system exclusively by its inputs and outputs, with no information whatsoever about its inner workings.)

Magnetic tape and wire voice recorders had been tested on RAF and USAAF bombers by 1943 thus adding to the assemblage of fielded and experimental electronic devices employed on Allied aircraft. As early as 1944 aviation writers envisioned use of these recording devices on commercial aircraft to aid incident investigations. When modern flight recorders were proposed to the British Aeronautical Research Council in 1958, the term "black box" was in colloquial use by experts.

By 1967, when flight recorders were mandated by leading aviation countries, the expression had found its way into general use: "These so-called 'black boxes' are, in fact, of fluorescent flame-orange in colour." The formal names of the devices are flight data recorder and cockpit voice recorder. The recorders must be housed in boxes that are bright orange in color to make them more visually conspicuous in the debris after an accident.

== Components ==
=== Flight data recorder ===
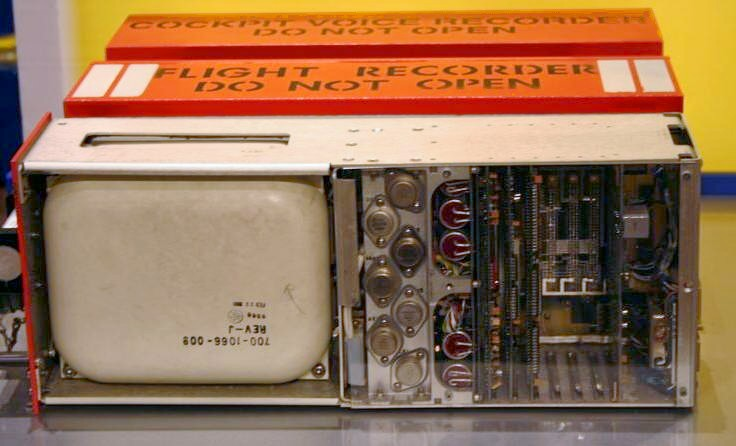
A typical flight recorder

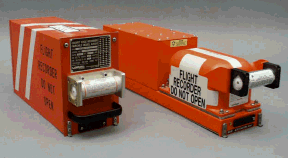
Cockpit voice recorder and flight data recorder, each with an underwater locator beacon on the front

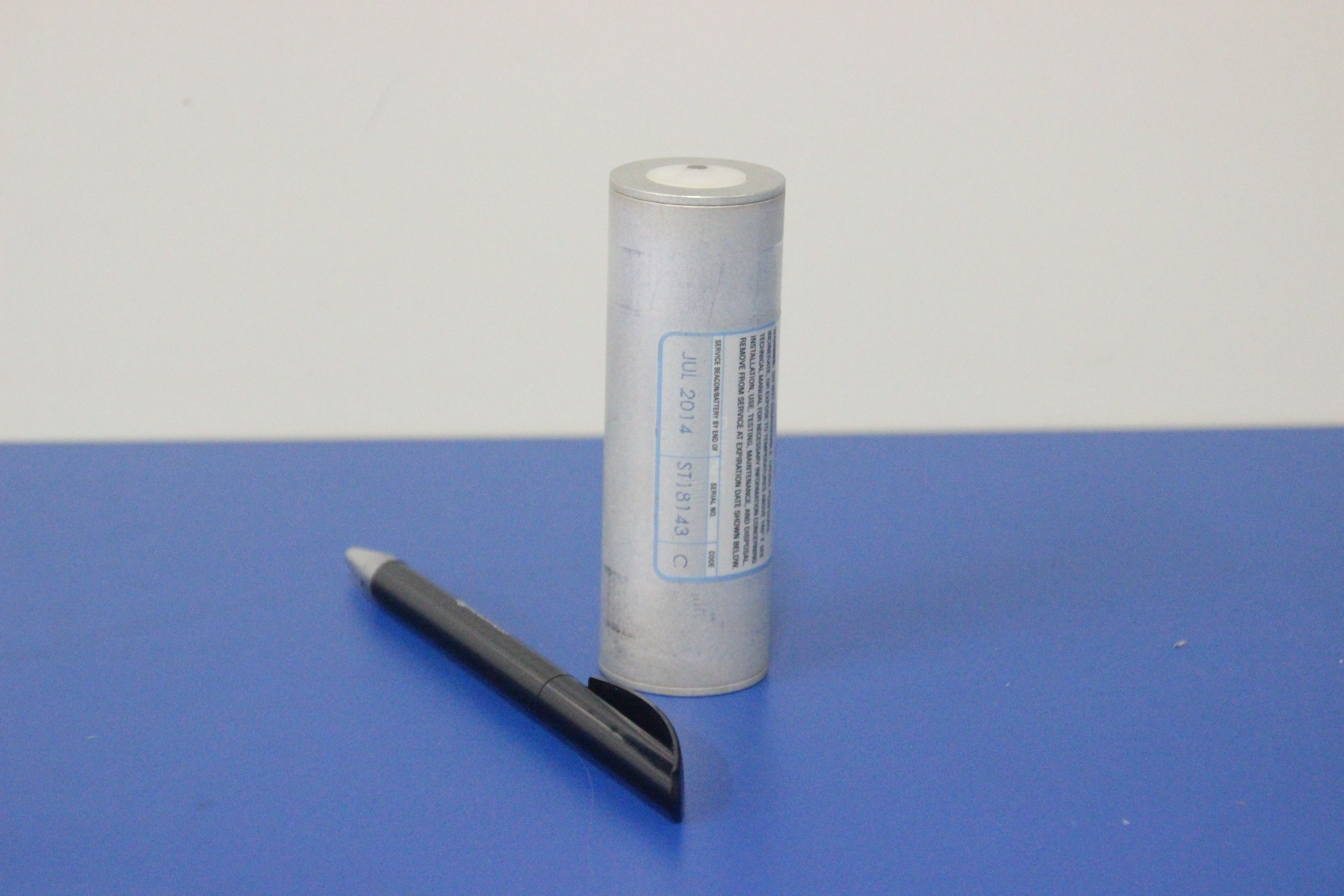
An underwater locator beacon; the ballpoint pen provides scale

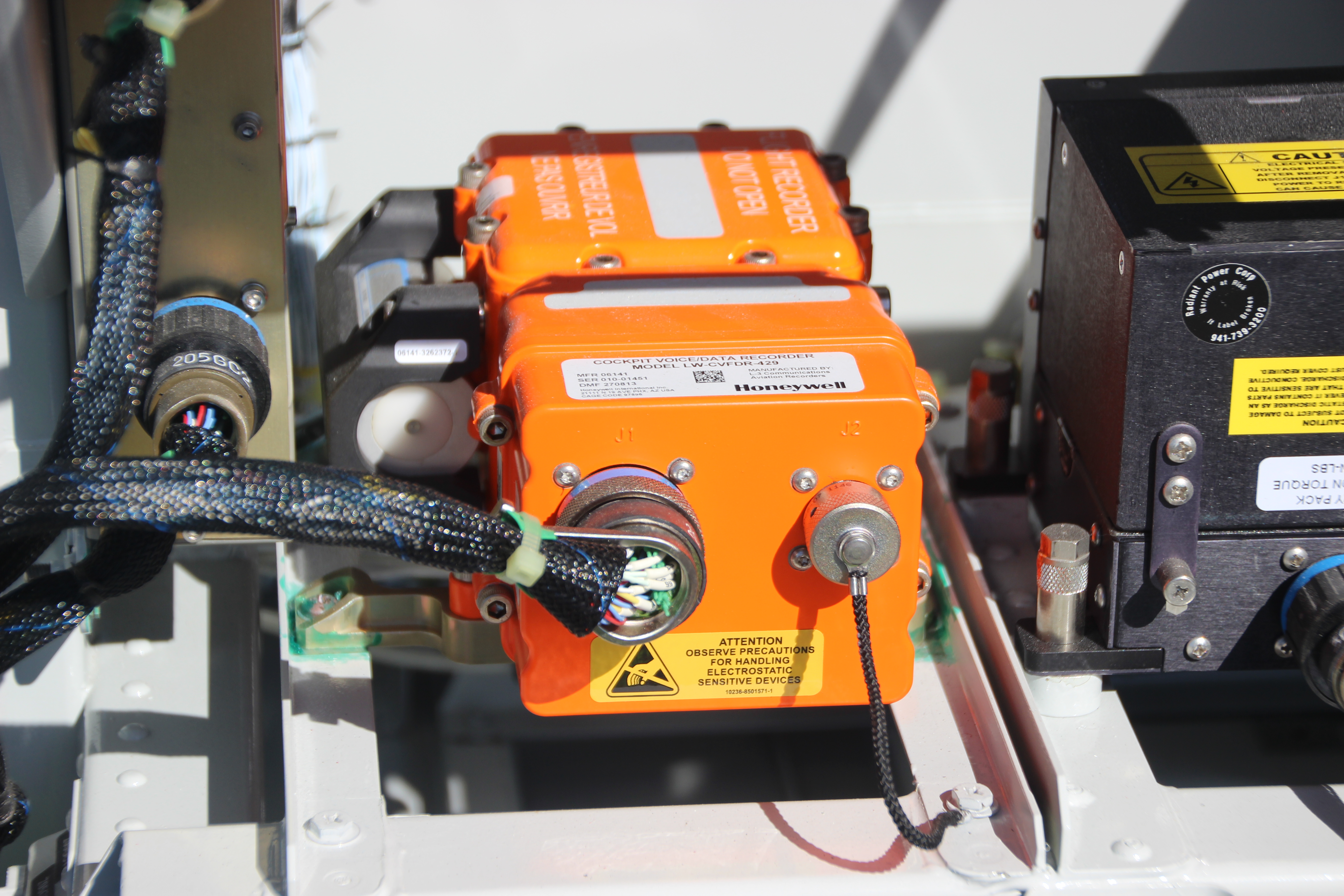
A cockpit voice and data recorder (CVDR), with its attached ULB visible on the left side of the unit

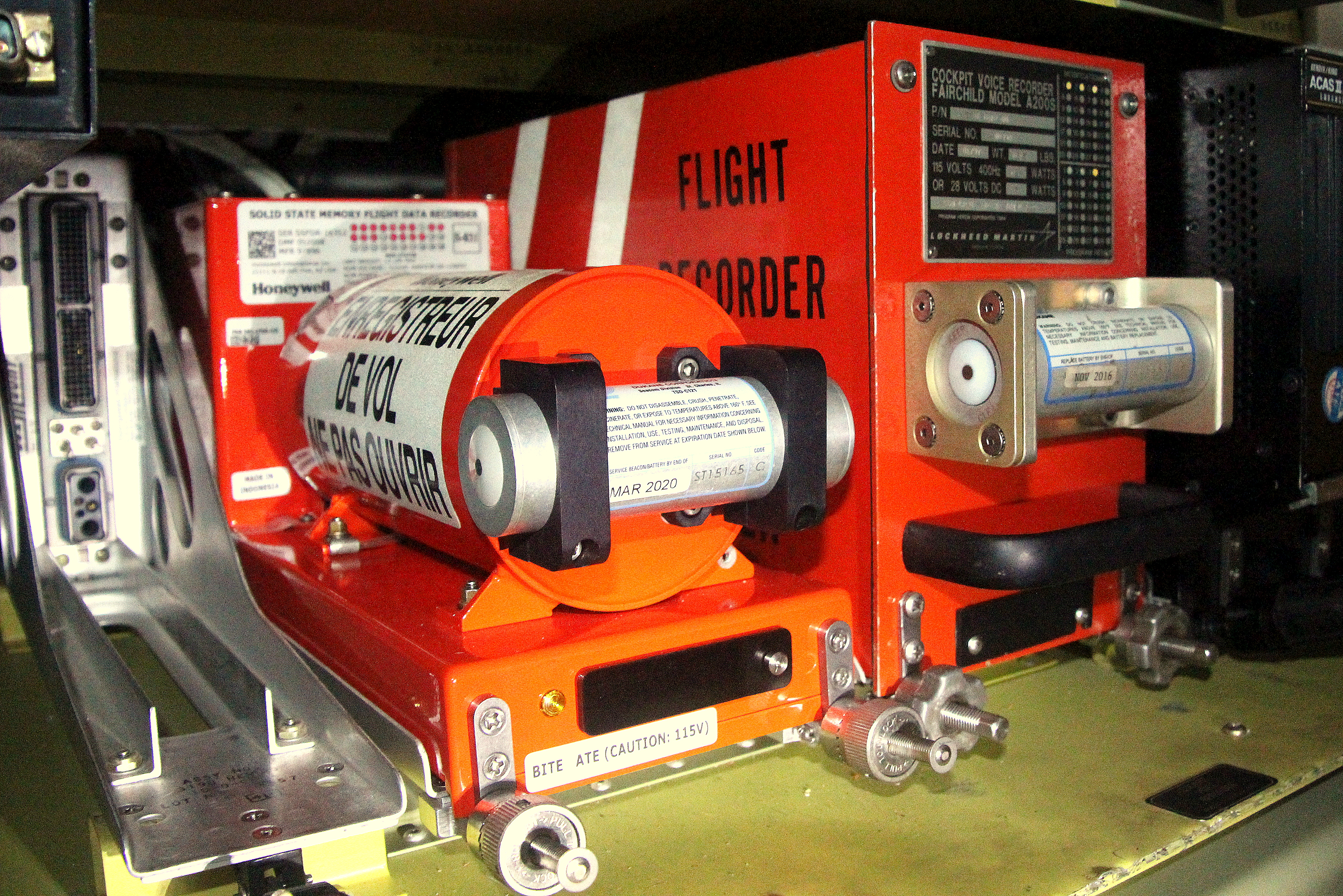
A flight data recorder and a cockpit voice recorder installed on their mounting trays in the rear fuselage of an aircraft

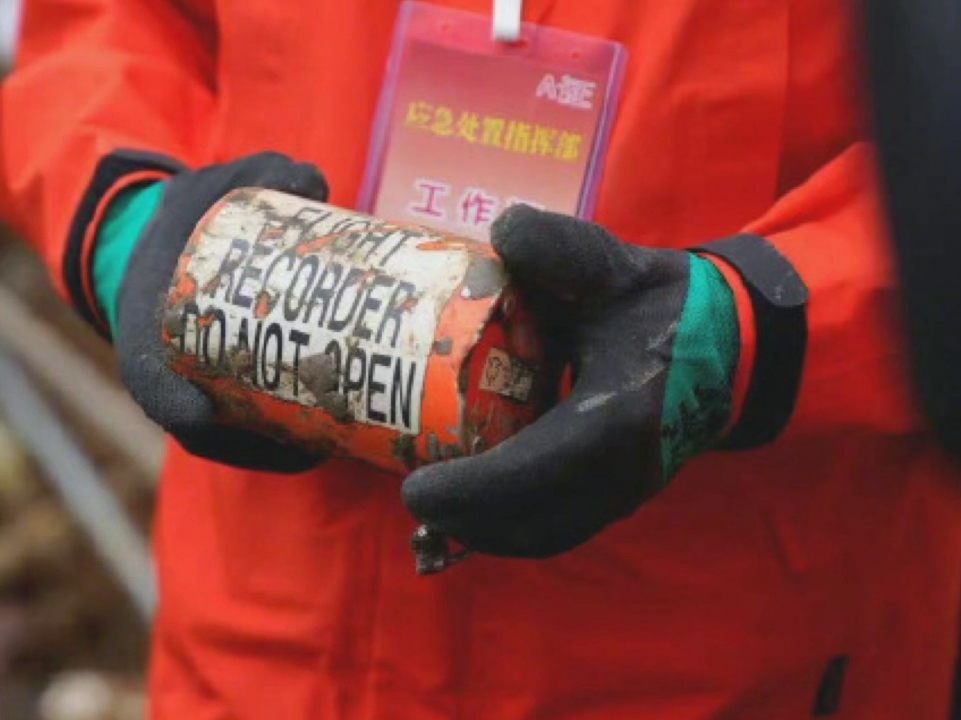
The flight data recorder for crashed flight China Eastern Airlines Flight 5735.

A flight data recorder (FDR; also ADR, for accident data recorder) is an electronic device employed to record instructions sent to any electronic systems on an aircraft.

The data recorded by the FDR are used for accident and incident investigation. Due to their importance in investigating accidents, these ICAO-regulated devices are carefully engineered and constructed to withstand the force of a high speed impact and the heat of an intense fire. Contrary to the popular term "black box", the exterior of the FDR is coated with heat-resistant bright orange paint for high visibility in wreckage, and the unit is usually mounted in the aircraft's tail section, where it is more likely to survive a crash. Following an accident, the recovery of the FDR is usually a high priority for the investigating body, as analysis of the recorded parameters can often detect and identify causes or contributing factors.

Modern day FDRs receive inputs via specific data frames from the flight-data acquisition units. They record significant flight parameters, including the control and actuator positions, engine information and time of day. There are 88 parameters required as a minimum under current US federal regulations (only 29 were required until 2002), but some systems monitor many more variables. Generally each parameter is recorded a few times per second, though some units store "bursts" of data at a much higher frequency if the data begin to change quickly. Most FDRs record approximately 17–25 hours of data in a continuous loop. It is required by regulations that an FDR verification check (readout) is performed annually in order to verify that all mandatory parameters are recorded. Many aircraft today are equipped with an "event" button in the cockpit that could be activated by the crew if an abnormality occurs in flight. Pushing the button places a signal on the recording, marking the time of the event.

Modern FDRs are typically double wrapped in strong corrosion-resistant stainless steel or titanium, with high-temperature insulation inside. Modern FDRs are accompanied by an underwater locator beacon that emits an ultrasonic "ping" to aid in detection when submerged. These beacons operate for up to 30 days and are able to operate while immersed to a depth of up to 6,000 meters (20,000 ft).

=== Cockpit voice recorder ===
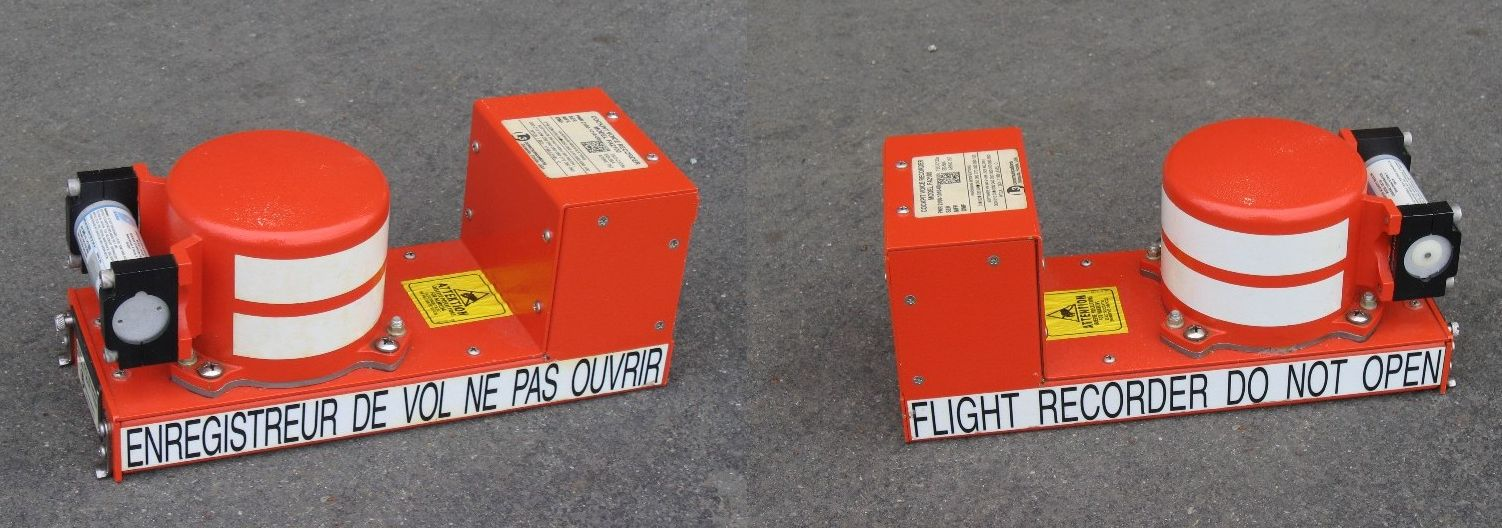
Both side views of a cockpit voice recorder, one type of flight recorder

A cockpit voice recorder (CVR) is a flight recorder used to record the audio environment in the flight deck of an aircraft for the purpose of investigation of accidents and incidents. This is typically achieved by recording the signals of the microphones and earphones of the pilots' headsets and of an area microphone in the roof of the cockpit. The current applicable FAA TSO is C123b titled Cockpit Voice Recorder Equipment.

Where an aircraft is required to carry a CVR and uses digital communications the CVR is required to record such communications with air traffic control unless this is recorded elsewhere. As of 2008 it is an FAA requirement that the recording duration is a minimum of two hours. The European Aviation Safety Agency increased the recording duration to 25 hours in 2021. In 2023, the FAA proposed extending requirements to 25 hours to help in investigations like runway incursions. In a January 2024 press conference on Alaska Airlines Flight 1282, National Transportation Safety Board (NTSB) chair Jennifer Homendy again called for extending retention to 25 hours, rather than the currently-mandated 2 hours, on all existing devices, rather than only newly manufactured ones.

A standard CVR is capable of recording four channels of audio data for a period of two hours. The original requirement was for a CVR to record for 30 minutes, but this has been found to be insufficient in many cases because significant parts of the audio data needed for a subsequent investigation occurred more than 30 minutes before the end of the recording.

The earliest CVRs used analog wire recording, later replaced by analog magnetic tape. Some of the tape units used two reels, with the tape automatically reversing at each end. The original was the ARL Flight Memory Unit produced in 1957 by Australian David Warren and instrument maker Tych Mirfield.

Other units used a single reel, with the tape spliced into a continuous loop, much as in an 8-track cartridge. The tape would circulate and old audio information would be overwritten every 30 minutes. Recovery of sound from magnetic tape often proves difficult if the recorder is recovered from water and its housing has been breached. Thus, the latest designs employ solid-state memory and use fault tolerant digital recording techniques, making them much more resistant to shock, vibration and moisture. With the reduced power requirements of solid-state recorders, it is now practical to incorporate a battery in the units, so that recording can continue until flight termination, even if the aircraft electrical system fails.

Like the FDR, the CVR is typically mounted in the rear of the airplane fuselage to maximize the likelihood of its survival in a crash.

=== Combined units ===
With the advent of digital recorders, the FDR and CVR can be manufactured in one fireproof, shock proof, and waterproof container as a combined digital cockpit voice and data recorder (CVDR). Currently, CVDRs are manufactured by Acron Aviation (formerly L3Harris Commercial Aviation Solutions) and Hensoldt among others. The Enhanced Airborne Flight Recorder (EAFR), manufactured by General Electric and fitted to the Boeing 787 Dreamliner, is a combined recorder which also includes a Recorder Independent Power Supply (RIPS) to allow continued operation in the event of a power failure.

Solid state recorders became commercially practical in 1990, having the advantage of not requiring scheduled maintenance and making the data easier to retrieve. This was extended to the two-hour voice recording in 1995.

=== Additional equipment ===
Since the 1970s, most large civil jet transports have been additionally equipped with a "quick access recorder" (QAR). This records data on a removable storage medium. Access to the FDR and CVR is necessarily difficult because they must be fitted where they are most likely to survive an accident; they also require specialized equipment to read the recording. The QAR recording medium is readily removable and is designed to be read by equipment attached to a standard desktop computer. In many airlines, the quick access recordings are scanned for "events", an event being a significant deviation from normal operational parameters. This allows operational problems to be detected and eliminated before an accident or incident results.

A flight-data acquisition unit (FDAU) is a unit that receives various discrete, analog and digital parameters from a number of sensors and avionic systems and then routes them to the FDR and, if installed, to the QAR. Information from the FDAU to the FDR is sent via specific data frames, which depend on the aircraft manufacturer.

Many modern aircraft systems are digital or digitally controlled. Very often, the digital system will include built-in test equipment which records information about the operation of the system. This information may also be accessed to assist with the investigation of an accident or incident.

== Specifications ==
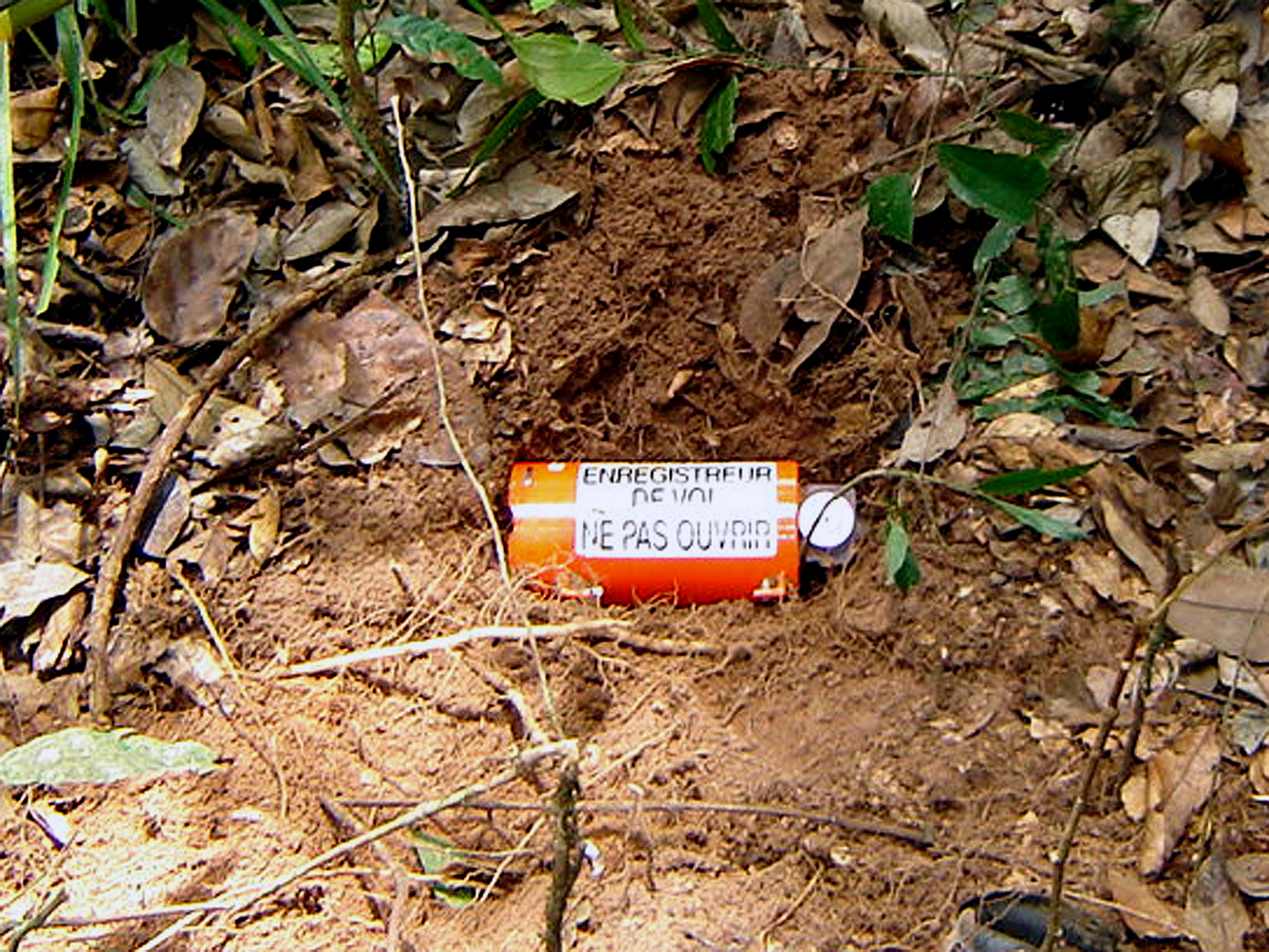
Cockpit voice recorder memory module of PR-GTD, a Gol Transportes Aéreos Boeing 737-8EH SFP, found in the Amazon in Mato Grosso, Brazil.

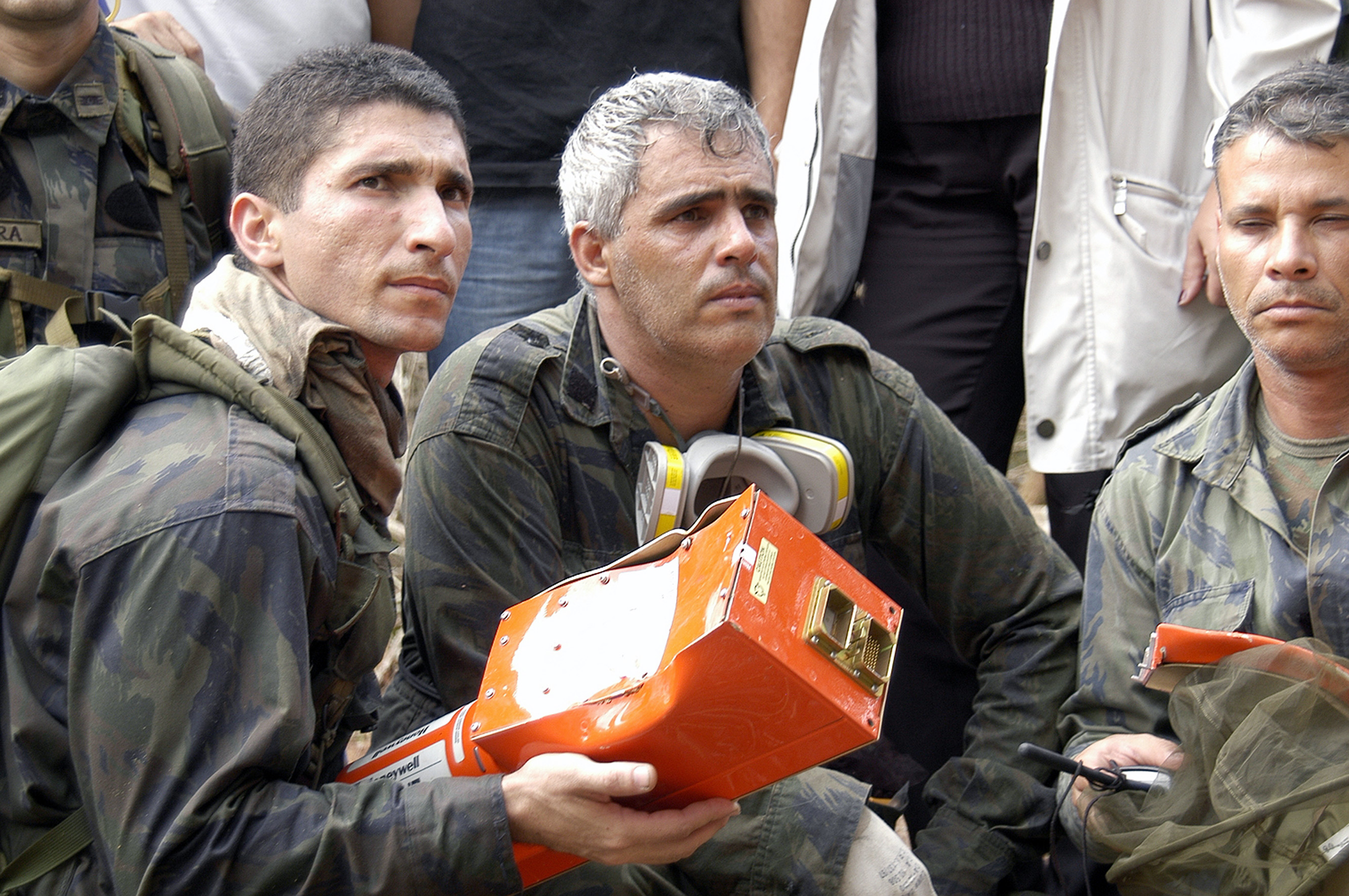
After the crash of Gol Transportes Aéreos Flight 1907, Brazilian Air Force personnel show the recovered flight data recorder

The design of today's FDR is governed by the internationally recognized standards and recommended practices relating to flight recorders which are contained in ICAO Annex 6 which makes reference to industry crashworthiness and fire protection specifications such as those to be found in the European Organisation for Civil Aviation Equipment documents EUROCAE ED55, ED56 Fiken A and ED112 (Minimum Operational Performance Specification for Crash Protected Airborne Recorder Systems). In the United States, the Federal Aviation Administration (FAA) regulates all aspects of US aviation, and cites design requirements in their Technical Standard Order, based on the EUROCAE documents (as do the aviation authorities of many other countries).

Currently, EUROCAE specifies that a recorder must be able to withstand an acceleration of 3400 g (33 km/s^{2}) for 6.5 milliseconds. This is roughly equivalent to an impact velocity of 270 knots (310 mph; 500 km/h) and a deceleration or crushing distance of 45 cm (18 in). Additionally, there are requirements for penetration resistance, static crush, high and low temperature fires, deep sea pressure, sea water immersion, and fluid immersion.

EUROCAE ED-112 (Minimum Operational Performance Specification for Crash Protected Airborne Recorder Systems) defines the minimum specification to be met for all aircraft requiring flight recorders for recording of flight data, cockpit audio, images and CNS / ATM digital messages and used for investigations of accidents or incidents. When issued in March 2003, ED-112 superseded previous ED-55 and ED-56A that were separate specifications for FDR and CVR. FAA TSOs for FDR and CVR reference ED-112 for characteristics common to both types.

In order to facilitate recovery of the recorder from an aircraft accident site, they are required to be coloured bright yellow or orange with reflective surfaces. All are lettered "Flight recorder do not open" on one side in English and "Enregistreur de vol ne pas ouvrir" in French on the other side. To assist recovery from submerged sites they must be equipped with an underwater locator beacon which is automatically activated in the event of an accident.

== Regulation ==
The first regulatory attempt to require flight data recorders occurred in April 1941, when the Civil Aeronautics Board (CAB) required flight recorders on passenger aircraft that would record the aircraft's altitude and whether the radio transmitter was turned on or off. The compliance deadline for that regulation was extended several times, until June 1944 when the requirement was rescinded due to maintenance problems and the lack of parts due to World War 2. A similar regulation was adopted in September 1947, which required recorders in aircraft of 10,000 pounds (4,500 kg) or more, but that requirement was again rescinded in July 1948 because of a lack of availability of reliable devices. In August 1957, the CAB adopted amendments to flight regulations that required the installation of flight recorders by July 1958 in all aircraft over 12,500 pounds (5,700 kg) and that were operated at altitudes over 25,000 feet. The requirements were further amended in September 1959, requiring the retention of records for 60 days, and the operation of the flight recorders continuously from the time of takeoff roll to the completion of the landing roll.

In the investigation of the 1960 crash of Trans Australia Airlines Flight 538 at Mackay, Queensland, the inquiry judge strongly recommended that flight recorders be installed in all Australian airliners. Australia became the first country in the world to make cockpit-voice recording compulsory.

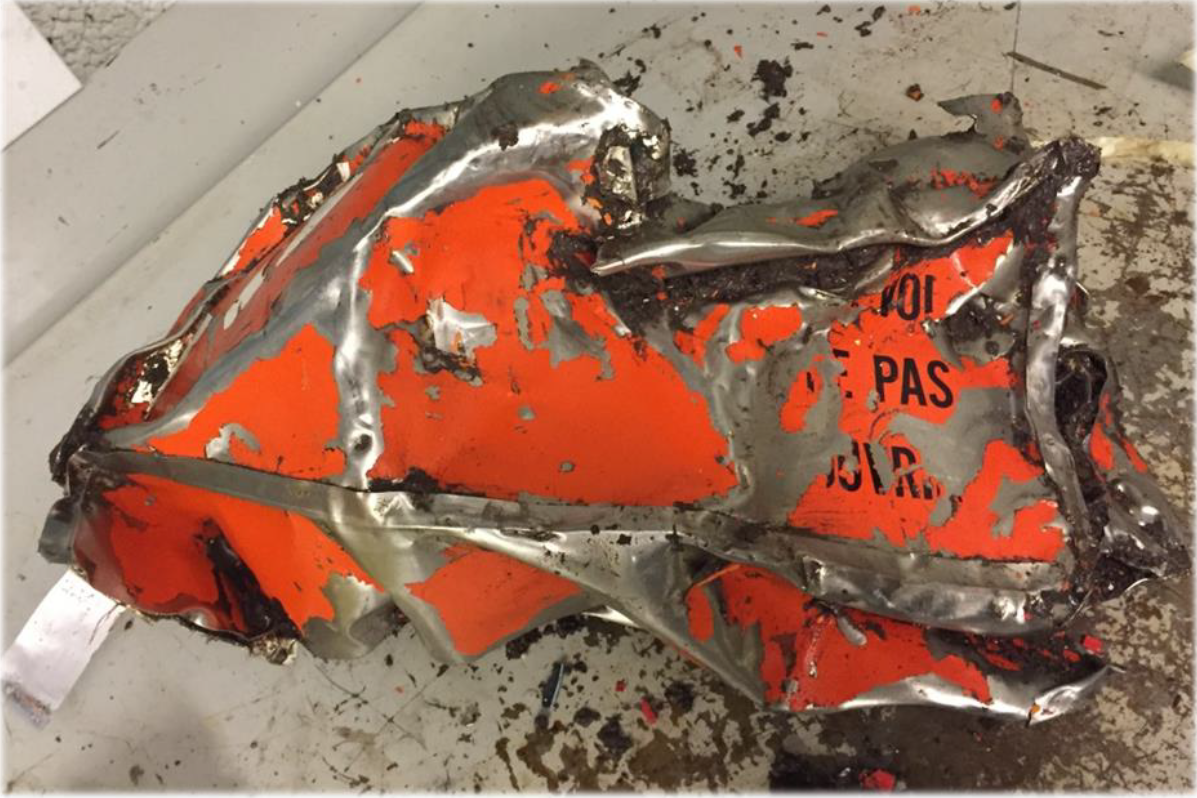
The digital flight data recorder from West Air Sweden Flight 294. All data was collected, even though the rest of the aircraft was heavily fragmented

The United States' first cockpit voice recorder rules were passed in 1964, requiring all turbine and piston aircraft with four or more engines to have CVRs by March 1, 1967. As of 2008 it is an FAA requirement that the CVR recording duration is a minimum of two hours, following the NTSB recommendation that it should be increased from its previously mandated 30-minute duration. From 2014 the United States requires flight data recorders and cockpit voice recorders on aircraft that have 20 or more passenger seats, or those that have six or more passenger seats, are turbine-powered, and require two pilots.

For US air carriers and manufacturers, the NTSB is responsible for investigating accidents and safety-related incidents. The NTSB also serves in an advisory role for many international investigations not under its formal jurisdiction. The NTSB does not have regulatory authority, but must depend on legislation and other government agencies to act on its safety recommendations. In addition, after the public outcry that followed recordings released for the crash of Delta Air Lines Flight 1141 in 1988, 49 USC Section 1114(c) prohibits the NTSB from making the audio recordings public except when related to a safety investigation, and in such cases the release is only in the form of a written transcript.

The ARINC Standards are prepared by the Airlines Electronic Engineering Committee (AEEC). The 700 Series of standards describe the form, fit, and function of avionics equipment installed predominately on transport category aircraft. The FDR is defined by ARINC Characteristic 747. The CVR is defined by ARINC Characteristic 757.

Post-incident overwriting of voice data by Nigerian crews led to a 2023 All Operators Letter reinforcing that this practice is forbidden.

=== Proposed requirements ===
==== Deployable recorders ====
The NTSB recommended in 1999 that operators be required to install two sets of CVDR systems, with the second CVDR designed to be ejected from the aircraft prior to impact with the ground or water. Ejection would be initiated by computer based on sensor information indicating a crash is imminent. A deployable recorder combines the cockpit voice/flight data recorders and an emergency locator transmitter (ELT) in a single unit. The unit would be designed to eject and float away from the aircraft and survive its descent to the ground, or float on water indefinitely. It would be equipped with satellite technology to aid in prompt recovery. Deployable CVDR technology has been used by the US Navy since 1993.

While the recommendations would involve a massive, expensive retrofit program, government funding would meet cost objections from manufacturers and airlines. Operators would get both sets of recorders (including the currently-used fixed recorder) free of charge. The cost of the second deployable/ejectable CVDR (or black box) was estimated at US$30 million for installation in 500 new aircraft (about $60,000 per new commercial plane).

In the United States, the proposed SAFE Act calls for implementing the NTSB 1999 recommendations. However, so far the proposed legislation has failed to pass Congress, having been introduced in 2003 (H.R. 2632), in 2005 (H.R. 3336), and in 2007 (H.R. 4336). Originally the Safe Aviation Flight Enhancement (SAFE) Act of 2003 was introduced on June 26, 2003, by Congressman David Price (D-NC) and Congressman John Duncan (R-Tenn.) in a bipartisan effort to ensure investigators have access to information immediately following accidents to transport category aircraft.

On July 19, 2005, a revised proposal for a SAFE Act was introduced and referred to the Committee on Transportation and Infrastructure of the US House of Representatives. The bill was referred to the House Subcommittee on Aviation during the 108th, 109th, and 110th Congresses.

==== After Malaysia Airlines Flight 370 ====
In the United States, on March 12, 2014, in response to the missing Malaysia Airlines Flight 370, David Price re-introduced the SAFE Act in the US House of Representatives.

The disappearance of Malaysia Airlines Flight 370 demonstrated the limits of the contemporary flight recorder technology, namely how physical possession of the flight recorder device is necessary to help investigate the cause of an aircraft incident. Considering the advances of modern communication, technology commentators called for flight recorders to be supplemented or replaced by a system that provides "live streaming" of data from the aircraft to the ground. Furthermore, commentators called for the underwater locator beacon's range and battery life to be extended, as well as the outfitting of civil aircraft with the deployable flight recorders typically used in military aircraft. Previous to MH370, the investigators of 2009 Air France Flight 447 urged that the battery life be extended as "rapidly as possible" after the crash's flight recorders went unrecovered for over a year.

==== After Indonesia AirAsia Flight 8501 ====
On December 28, 2014, Indonesia AirAsia Flight 8501, en route from Surabaya, Indonesia, to Singapore, crashed in bad weather, killing all 155 passengers and seven crew on board.

On January 8, 2015, before the recovery of the flight recorders, an anonymous ICAO representative said: "The time has come that deployable recorders are going to get a serious look." A second ICAO official said that public attention had "galvanized momentum in favour of ejectable recorders on commercial aircraft".

==== Boeing 737 MAX ====
Live flight data streaming as on the Boeing 777F ecoDemonstrator, plus 20 minutes of data before and after a triggering event, could have removed the uncertainty before the Boeing 737 MAX groundings following the March 2019 Ethiopian Airlines Flight 302 crash. In the Alaska Airlines Flight 1282 accident, the Cockpit Voice Recorder functioned properly but the data was overwritten as the CVR remained powered, and functioning. The critical accident data was overwritten by over two hours of post-incident sounds until a maintenance crew could enter the aircraft after the incident and power down the CVR.

==== Image recorders ====
The NTSB has asked for the installation of cockpit image recorders in large transport aircraft to provide information that would supplement existing CVR and FDR data in accident investigations. They have recommended that image recorders be placed into smaller aircraft that are not required to have a CVR or FDR. The rationale is that what is seen on an instrument by the pilots of an aircraft is not necessarily the same as the data sent to the display device. This is particularly true of aircraft equipped with electronic displays (CRT or LCD). A mechanical instrument panel is likely to preserve its last indications, but this is not the case with an electronic display. Such systems, estimated to cost less than $8,000 installed, typically consist of a camera and microphone located in the cockpit to continuously record cockpit instrumentation, the outside viewing area, engine sounds, radio communications, and ambient cockpit sounds. As with conventional CVRs and FDRs, data from such a system is stored in a crash-protected unit to ensure survivability. Since the recorders can sometimes be crushed into unreadable pieces, or even located in deep water, some modern units are self-ejecting (taking advantage of kinetic energy at impact to separate themselves from the aircraft) and also equipped with radio emergency locator transmitters and sonar underwater locator beacons to aid in their location.

== Cultural references ==
- The artwork for the band Rammstein's album Reise, Reise is made to look like a CVR; it also includes a recording from a crash. The recording is from the last 1–2 minutes of the CVR of Japan Air Lines Flight 123, which crashed on August 12, 1985, killing 520 people; JAL123 is the deadliest single-aircraft disaster in history.
- Members of the performing arts collective Collective:Unconscious made a theatrical presentation of a play called Charlie Victor Romeo with a script based on transcripts from CVR voice recordings of nine aircraft emergencies. The play features the famous United Airlines Flight 232 that crash-landed in a cornfield near Sioux City, Iowa, after suffering a catastrophic failure of one engine and most flight controls.
- Survivor, a novel by American author Chuck Palahniuk, is about a cult member who dictates his life story to a flight recorder before the plane runs out of fuel and crashes.
- In stand-up comedy, many jokes have been made asking why the entire airplane is not made out of the material used to make black boxes, given that the black box survives the crash (it's because then it would be too heavy to fly). This is referenced in the 2001 Chris Rock movie Down to Earth, although the original joke is widely credited to George Carlin.

== See also ==
- Acronyms and abbreviations in avionics
- Data logger
- Emergency locator beacon
- Emergency position-indicating radiobeacon station
- Event data recorder
- Flight operations quality assurance
- Korean Air Lines Flight 007
- List of unrecovered and unusable flight recorders
- Quick access recorder
- Software flight recorder
- Train event recorder
- Voyage data recorder
