= Charlie Victor Romeo =

1999 play

- Original language: English
- Subject: Crew Resource Management
- Genre: Documentary theatre
- Setting: Airplane cockpits

Premiere
- Date: Fall 1999
- Place: United States
- Official website

Charlie Victor Romeo is a 1999 play, and later a 2013 film based on the play, whose script consists of almost-verbatim transcripts from six real aviation accidents and incidents. "Charlie Victor Romeo," or CVR, derived from the aviation phonetic alphabet, is aviation jargon for cockpit voice recorder. The play is a case study in crew resource management; a PBS special described several parallels between the behavior seen in these disasters and in emergency room situations.

The play opens with a flight attendant demonstrating the safety equipment and reminding the audience to fasten their seat belts and turn off cell phones. Before each scene, a display screen shows the name of the flight and reason for the disaster (e.g. "Icing" or "Multiple bird strikes"). Sound effects such as cockpit alarms, aircraft interior ambiances and mechanical sounds are included. At the end of each flight, the screen shows the number of casualties. A few of the transcripts were edited for time. At the end of the play, the cast and creators answer questions from the audience.

== History ==
The play was created by Bob Berger, Patrick Daniels and Irving Gregory of Collective:Unconscious in 1999. It was taped and used by the Pentagon for pilot training. US Air Force Major General Walter E. Buchanan III awarded the group a letter of gratitude. After February 2002 performances in Perth, Australia, the play performed in dozens of venues across the United States, including Washington, DC's Studio Theatre.

In 2004, Time put Charlie Victor Romeo on their Best Plays of the Year list. The play has been performed in Japanese by the Rinkogun Theater Company under the direction of Yoji Sakate. In 2012, Charlie Victor Romeo was made into a motion picture, which premiered at the 2013 Sundance Film festival.

== Accidents and incidents ==
The FAA distinguishes between aviation accidents and incidents: an accident is an occurrence aboard an aircraft that injures or kills one or more passengers or crew members, while an incident is “an occurrence involving one or more aircraft in which a hazard or a potential hazard to safety is involved but not classified as an accident due to the degree of injury and/or extent of damage." The accidents and incidents depicted are:

- American Airlines Flight 1572 (12 November 1995) – The crew of the McDonnell Douglas MD-83 incorrectly set the altimeter on approach to Bradley International Airport in Hartford, Connecticut, so they were flying 70 feet lower than they thought they were. This led to them crashing into the treetops as they tried to perform a night landing. The engines ingested the trees and failed. With the engines no longer producing thrust, the captain made a last ditch attempt to get the plane to the airport by selecting 40° of flaps which increased the lift enough to allow them to make it almost to the threshold of runway 15. There, they crashed into a tree at the airport boundary, then into the ILS antenna at the approach end of runway 15. There were no casualties amongst the 78 on board the aircraft.
- American Eagle Flight 4184 (31 October 1994) – A design flaw in the ATR-72 de-icing systems forced the plane into a sudden roll from which the crew was unable to recover. The plane then crashed into a field, killing all 68 on board the aircraft.
- Aeroperú Flight 603 (2 October 1996) – The maintenance crew had taped over the static ports of a Boeing 757-200 before washing the plane, and then failed to remove the tape. This resulted in the flight instruments, such as the altimeter and airspeed indicator, failing while the plane was flying through dense fog at 1 AM over the ocean. They had a confused sense of where they were and contradictory information about altitude and airspeed. The co-pilot began reading through the manual, trying to figure out how to solve the problem. Meanwhile, all sorts of warnings were going off, both because the plane thought that the instrument readings were consistent with various emergencies and because the crew's actions, based on false data, were creating problems. The pilot communicated with the air traffic controller, who kept telling them that they were at 9,700 feet. Actually, they were flying dangerously low, as indicated by the repeated "Too low. Terrain!" warning. The pilot decided to descend and ended up crashing into the ocean, killing all 70 on board the aircraft. Air traffic control had been relaying the faulty altitude information transmitted by the plane's transponder.
- United States Air Force Yukla 27 (22 September 1995) – Another plane disturbed a flock of several hundred Canada geese on the runway, which then took off in unison. However, the tower failed to inform the crew before they took off and flew into the flock. Both engines on the left wing ingested birds and failed catastrophically. In accordance with their training, the crew of the Boeing 707 started dumping fuel in order to lighten the craft. They began a left turn and attempted to return to the airport. The aircraft struck a low-hill on the north side of the airfield and exploded, killing all 24 on board the aircraft.
- Japan Air Lines Flight 123 (12 August 1985) – A bulkhead of a Boeing 747SR ruptured, causing the loss of the vertical fin and all hydraulics. The crew had no way to control the plane except by adjusting engine throttles. They flew the plane expertly with what controls they had and kept it aloft for about a half-hour, but the plane finally crashed into a mountain, killing 520 of the 524 on board, the deadliest single-aircraft disaster in history. Investigators later attributed the bulkhead rupture to Boeing technicians incorrectly repairing damage from a tail strike seven years earlier.
- United Airlines Flight 232 (19 July 1989) – The DC-10 center engine's fan disc shattered, severing hydraulic lines and forcing the shutdown of the engine, taking out all three of the triply redundant hydraulic systems—something that was considered impossible, so there was no emergency procedure for it. As with Japan Air Lines Flight 123, they had no control of the flight control surfaces, and used left and right engine throttles to control the aircraft. The misconception with this incident is that the crew handed over the controls to a flight instructor who was on board the flight, but this is in fact incorrect. The original crew remained in control of the aircraft and the DC-10 flight instructor was actually a non-revenue passenger aboard the aircraft who offered his assistance to the captain. Together they managed to land at Sioux Gateway Airport. The wings dipped at the last moment leading to a crash killing 110 of its 285 passengers and one of the 11 crew members. The then somewhat new concept of Crew Resource Management was credited extensively by the crew and the NTSB as a leading factor in keeping a truly horrific accident from being much worse, and saving over 180 lives that would have almost surely been lost had the concept of the "Infallible Captain" still been in use.

== Original credits ==
Created by: Bob Berger, Patrick Daniels, Irving Gregory, of Collective:Unconscious.

Directed by: Bob Berger, Patrick Daniels, Irving Gregory.

Developed in collaboration with: Bob Berger, Michael Bruno, Audrey Crabtree, Patrick Daniels, Justin Dávila, Jim Grady, Irving Gregory, Dan Krumm, Peter O'Clair, Julia Randall, Stuart Rudin, Darby Thompson, Oliver Wyman.

Sound design: Jamie Mereness

Original set design and technical director: Patrick Daniels

Motion picture sound mixing: Joel Hamilton

== Awards ==
Official Selection DocPoint – Helsinki Documentary Film Festival 2014

Official Selection American Film Institute AFI Fest 2013

- American Independent

Official Selection Copenhagen International Documentary Festival 2013

Official Selection Hamptons International Film Festival 2013

- World Cinema Narrative

Official Selection New York Film Festival 2013

- Convergence

Official Selection Sundance Film Festival 2013

- New Frontier

Drama Desk Awards 2000

- Outstanding Unique Theatrical Experience
- Outstanding Sound Design, Jamie Mereness

5th Annual Backstage West Garland Awards 2002

- Sound Design, Jamie Mereness

United States Department of Defense Visual Information Production Award

- 2000-01 Creativity Award, Video produced by 367th Training Support Squadron, Media Production Flight, Hill AFB, UT, Office of Primary Responsibility: HQ USAF, Deputy Chief of Staff/Air and Space Operations.

New York International Fringe Festival 2000

- Overall Excellence - Drama
- Overall Excellence - Sound Design, Jamie Mereness

Absolut Angel Arts and Technology Award 2000

- Grand Prize Winner, Justin Dávila and Bob Berger
