= Pianos (club) =

Bar and performance venue in New York City

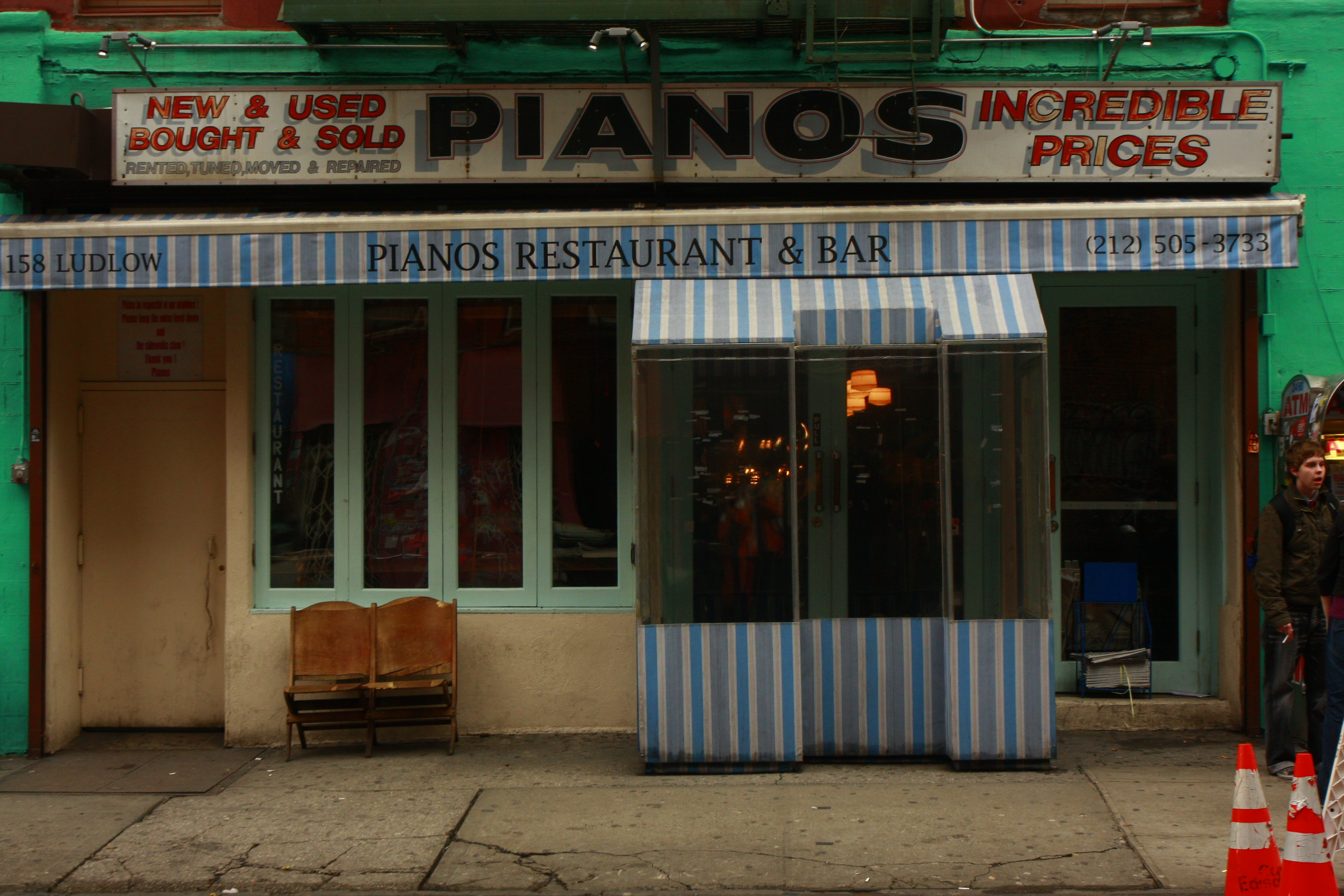
- April 4, 2008
- Interactive map of Pianos
- Address: 158 Ludlow Street
- Location: Lower East Side, Manhattan, New York
- Coordinates: 40.721°N 73.988°W
- Capacity: 140

Construction
- Opened: 2002

Website
- www.pianosnyc.com

Pianos is a two-story bar/restaurant/live music venue on the Lower East Side of Manhattan at 158 Ludlow Street. Its stage attracts local and national alternative rock groups as well as DJs, such as Nick Hadad & Jackson Walker. A more typical performance would consist of smaller name local and touring acts.

Pianos follows the example of Arlene's Grocery by keeping the "Pianos" name and sign from the store that previously existed there when it was conceivable that a piano store might make it on the Lower East Side. Pianos has two stages: one that has upstairs in a funky loungelike setting, and one in a back room off the main floor.

Seth Kugel of The New York Times praised Pianos' menu as "surprisingly respectable", likening it to bar food that has been subjected to a transformation on Extreme Makeover. Kugel singled out the red wine burger encrusted in black pepper, and fried mozzarella served with roasted basil tomato.

Pianos currently hosts nightly concerts in their live music room. While displaying multiple genres, they are noted to host local hard and alternative rock bands like Mach Dharma and they have also given a Saturday night headlining residency to rock power trio Violent in Black.
