= New York International Fringe Festival =

Fringe festival in New York City

New York International Fringe Festival (FringeNYC)
- Location: New York City
- Founded: 1997
- Founded by: Aaron Beall; John Clancy; Jonathan Harris; Elena K. Holy
- Most recent: 2019
- Artistic director: Elena K. Holy
- Type of play: Fringe theater
- Festival date: October
- Website: fringenyc.org

The New York International Fringe Festival, or FringeNYC, was a fringe theater festival held annually from 1997 until 2019 (but not in 2017). One of the largest multi-arts events in North America, it took place over the course of a few weeks in October, spread on more than 20 stages across several neighborhoods in downtown Manhattan, notably the Lower East Side, the East Village, and Greenwich Village. Most of the venues were centered on the FringeHUB. Yearly attendance topped 75,000 people.

== Festival ==
Unlike most Fringe festivals, FringeNYC uses a jury-based selection process. Around 200 shows, out of a much larger pool of applicants, are selected for inclusion each year. However, in 2018 the Festival reduced the number of shows.

The festival was founded in 1997 by Aaron Beall, John Clancy, Jonathan Harris (also known as Ezra Buzzington), and (current artistic director) Elena K. Holy, and is produced by The Present Company.

Notable shows that premiered at FringeNYC include Urinetown, Dog Sees God, the musical adaptation of Debbie Does Dallas, and the American English-language premiere of The Black Rider. Other feature shows included Charlie Victor Romeo, which premiered at New York Lower East Side theatre Collective:Unconscious.

FringeNYC includes many component events, such as FringeU (educational events), FringeART (art events), FringeAL FRESCO (free outdoor performances), and FringeJR (children's events).

At the conclusion of the festival out of 200 shows, around 20 shows are selected to participate in the FringeNYC Encore Series which runs for an additional two weeks in September.

The festival went on hiatus in 2017 to revise its format and develop ambitious long-term plans. It ran in the fall of 2018 and 2019 with fewer performances and smaller venues and included performances in the outer boroughs. After the 2019 festival, there was no further activity. The website was taken down in May 2021. In 2024, the FRIGID Fringe Festival rebranded as New York City Fringe.

== See also ==
- FRIGID New York
