= Nasty Canasta (burlesque) =

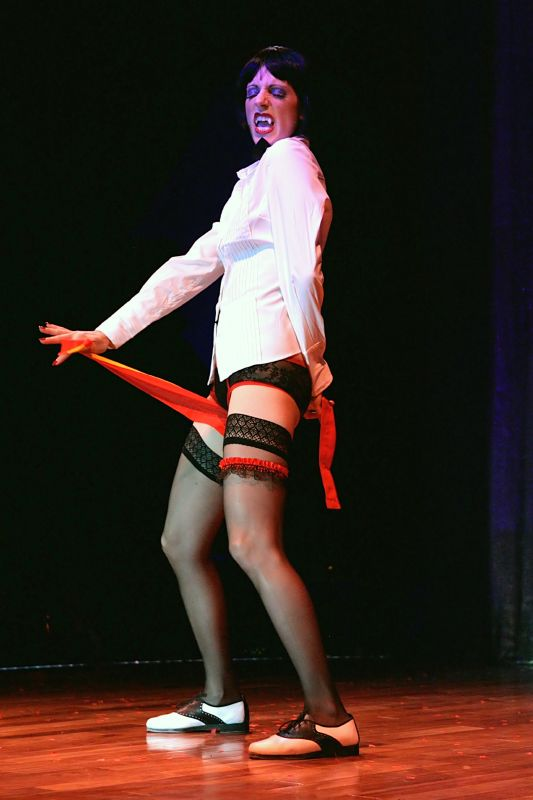
Nasty Canasta at the 2006 Miss Exotic World Pageant

Nasty Canasta is a New York City-based Neo-Burlesque performer. She is the producer and host of Sweet & Nasty Burlesque, and the featured performer in the New York branch of Naked Girls Reading.

== Biography ==
The Brooklyn Paper calls Canasta "Brooklyn’s greatest burlesque star". Canasta has won multiple awards and accolades, including sharing the first-ever "Most Innovative" award from the Burlesque Hall of Fame as well as second runner-up in the "Queen of Burlesque" category, and numerous Golden Pastie Awards from the New York Burlesque Festival.

Canasta was married to fellow burlesque performer and writer Jonny Porkpie but the two have since divorced. She is the inspiration for the fictional character "Filthy Lucre" in Porkpie's book The Corpse Wore Pasties (Hard Case Crime, 2009).

Canasta has gone on to write and stage multiple scripted burlesque shows based on works like King Kong, Casablanca, and A Christmas Carol. She is the producer of the NYC branch of Naked Girls Reading and performs all over North America.
