= Kirk Wood Bromley =

Playwright and musician (b. 1966)

Kirk Wood Bromley (born January 12, 1966) is a playwright and musician who lives in Brooklyn, NY, and southern Arizona. Frequently likened to a contemporary Shakespeare, he is one of the only living playwrights whose body of work is dedicated entirely to the creation of new verse plays. He and his company, Inverse Theater, which he co-founded with Chad Gracia (Director of The Russian Woodpecker) and of which he is the artistic director, have produced over 15 of his plays on stage and as audiobook, won numerous awards, and been positively reviewed in various media outlets. As a musician, he is the songwriter, lead vocalist and multi-instrumentalist for The Good Hard.
