= Ludlow Street =

Street in Manhattan, New York

Coordinates: 40°43′12″N 73°59′18″W

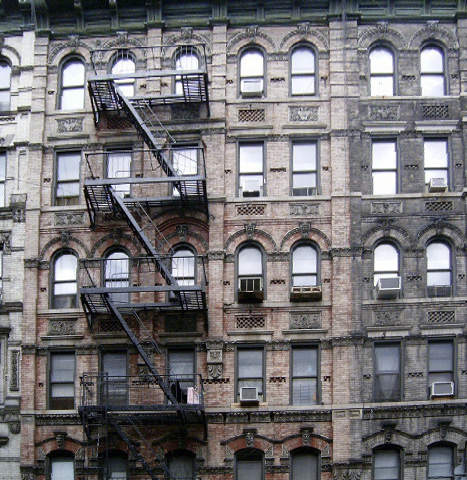
Tenements on Ludlow Street

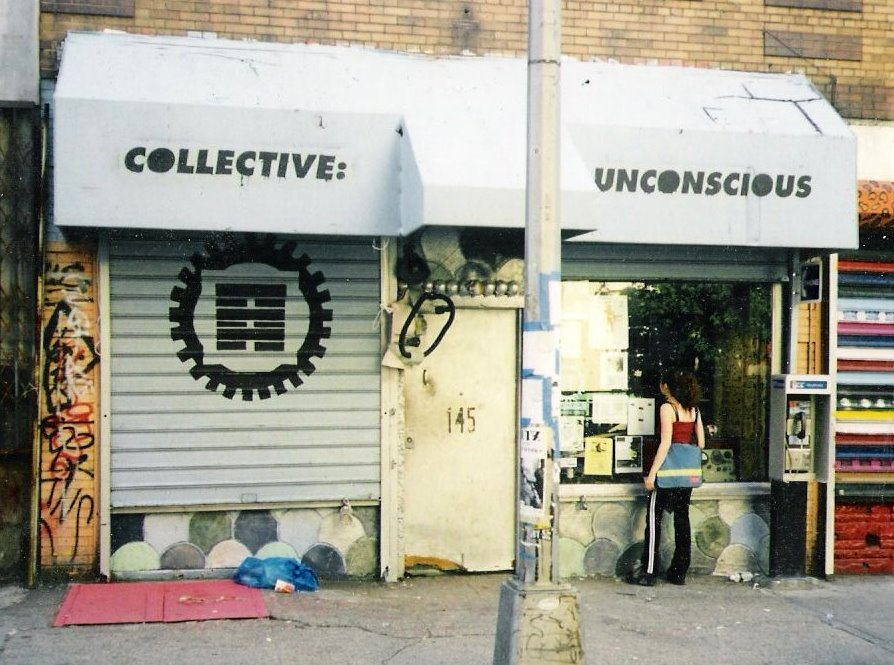
Collective:Unconscious Theater at 145 Ludlow in 1997

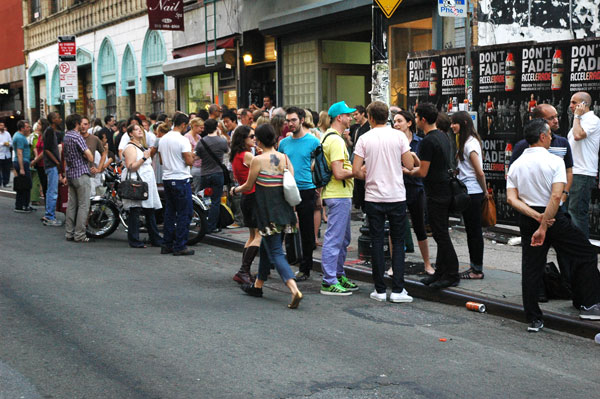
Art opening at 143 Ludlow Street in 2007

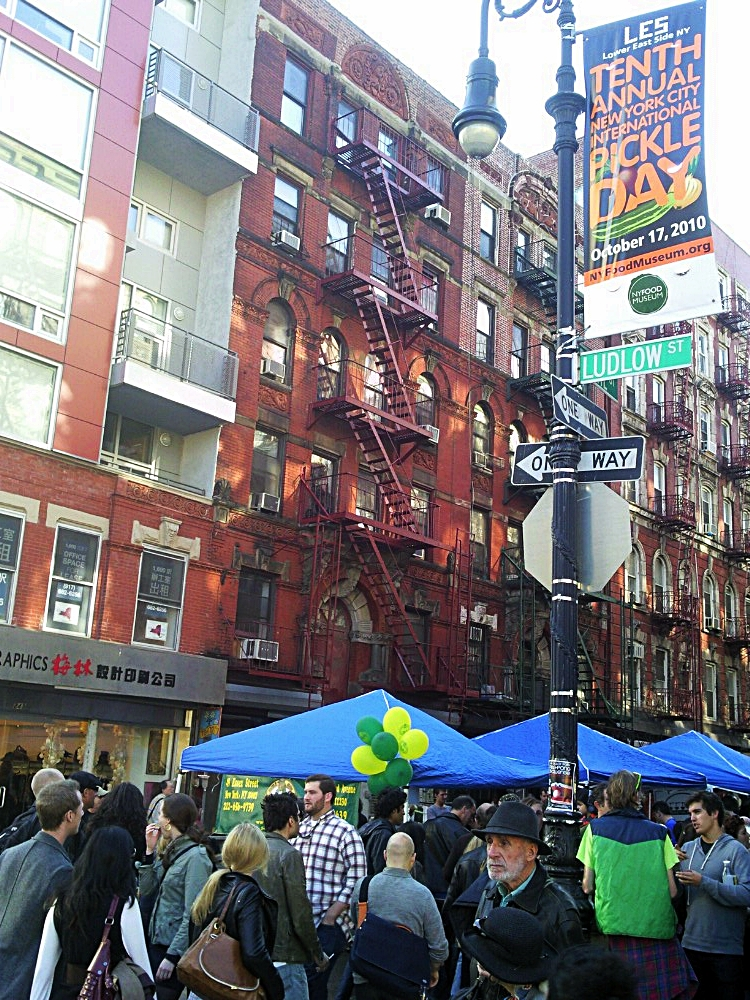
2010 New York City International Pickle Day Festival

Ludlow Street runs between Houston and Division streets on the Lower East Side of Manhattan in New York City. Vehicular traffic runs south on this one-way street.

== Name ==
Ludlow Street was named after Lieutenant Augustus Ludlow, the naval officer who was second-in-command to Captain James Lawrence on the USS Chesapeake during the ship’s engagement with HMS Shannon on June 1, 1813. It was to Ludlow that Lawrence said "Don't give up the ship."

== History ==
=== Early history ===
The land that is now Ludlow Street was once part of the huge De Lancey Estate, which had been confiscated from James De Lancey after the Revolutionary War, due to his status as a Loyalist, and auctioned off. By the early 19th century, speculative builders had constructed decent housing for workers on Ludlow Street, as well as other streets nearby, such as Eldridge, Forsyth and Chrystie Streets. At mid-century, Ludlow was in the middle of Kleindeutschland, where large numbers of German-speaking immigrants had settled, and was one of the informal boundaries of the Jewish section of the neighborhood, along with Grand, Stanton, and Pitt Streets.

=== Art and music scene ===
As far back as 1962 Theatre of Eternal Music members Tony Conrad and Angus MacLise lived and worked at 56 Ludlow and in 1965 Lou Reed, John Cale and Sterling Morrison of The Velvet Underground lived and recorded there. The earliest known recorded version of All Tomorrow's Parties was recorded there. Other filmmakers, performers, poets, artists and musicians that lived in the building at the time included Warhol superstars Mario Montez and Jack Smith. Tony Conrad has produced two CDs from the Jack Smith tape archives subtitled 56 Ludlow Street that were recorded at 56 Ludlow Street between 1962 and 1964. In the mid-1970s Gary Weis made some short films of Taylor Mead talking to his cat in the kitchen of his Ludlow Street apartment called Taylor Mead's Cat. From 1980 to the mid-80s actor/videomaker Craig Calman lived in the building adjoining Taylor Mead's. An excerpt from Tyler Hubby's film Tony Conrad: Completely in the Present documents Tony Conrad making a field recording on Ludlow Street.

In the early 1980s, Ludlow Street was well known as a street where no wave Colab artists connected with ABC No Rio lived; such as Kiki Smith, Fab Five Freddy, Coleen Fitzgibbon, Tom Otterness, Wolfgang Staehle, Steven Parrino, Joseph Nechvatal, Peter Fend, Walter Robinson, Aline Mare, George Condo and art critic Carlo McCormick. In 1980, Coleen Fitzgibbon made a video called Ludlow about Ludlow Street. From 1983 to 1989, the bimonthly cassette publication Tellus Audio Cassette Magazine was based out of 143 Ludlow Street. Leonard Abrams started the East Village Eye cultural magazine at 167 Ludlow Street. In 1989 the Beastie Boys used a photo of the southwest corner of Ludlow and Rivington Street as the cover for their album Paul's Boutique. The intersection was renamed “Beastie Boys Square” on September 9, 2023. In 2015, Mitch Corber created a short documentary video called Ludlow Street with Clayton that features Clayton Patterson walking down the street, discussing its cultural demise due to gentrification. Wolfgang Staehle presented an extended digital photographic record of Ludlow Street in his exhibition at Postmasters Gallery in 2016/2017. From 1995 to 2004 the performing and visual arts space Collective:Unconscious was located at 145 Ludlow Street. In 2009, the School of Visual Arts established its Ludlow Residence at 101 Ludlow Street, which houses 350 art students. The notable music club Luna Lounge, an instrumental venue that help usher in what became a new millennial wave of guitar bands like The Strokes, Interpol and The National, was located at 171 Ludlow Street from 1993 until 2005.

=== Gentrification ===
By the end of the 1990s the street was dubbed "Downtown's Disneyland" by New York Magazine and "the New Bohemia" by The New York Times.

In the 2000s, Ludlow Street was a destination street for musicians and music-lovers, and was heavily populated with fashion shops, art galleries, bars, restaurants, and performance venues such as Cake Shop, The Living Room, and Piano's making Ludlow into a small nightlife strip with a distinct subcultural flavor. Local institutions included the bistro/cafe Pink Pony, the adjacent artist bar Max Fish, Katz's Deli (one of the city's most famous delicatessens) Motor City bar, Ludlow Street Guitars, Earthmatters Cafe (hangout of musicians/actors/writers/techies), Ludlow Studio (which was home to some of the top recording artists in the mid-1990s) and the Sombrero Mexican restaurant, better known to a generation of musicians as "The Hat." The art and cultural gallery Ludlow 38 is the downtown satellite for contemporary art of the Goethe-Institut New York. The space was designed by artists Ethan Breckenridge and Liam Gillick. In 2005 artist Wolfgang Staehle created One day of life on Ludlow Street (New York). The work consists of 6716 images displayed in approximately 8 second intervals over 24 hours.

In 2013, Ludlow Street between Delancey and Houston Streets lost to rising rent many small interesting shops, bars and cafes that once gave the street its distinctive flavor. Closed were: Pink Pony Cafe Littéraire & Ciné Club, the print shop at 139 Ludlow, Press Tea, Earth Matters natural food store and Motor City bar. However, Banksy installed a major street art installation on Ludlow Street in the fall of 2013 as part of his Better Out Than In residency: a strange vision of horses with camera-lens goggles rearing up by a car covered with cowering humans. The work is Banksy’s largest New York work to date.

== In popular culture ==
- Suzanne Vega's song, "Ludlow Street", from the 2007 album Beauty and Crime.
- The Julian Casablancas album Phrazes for the Young includes a song titled "Ludlow St."
- The AaRON album Birds in the Storm includes a song titled Ludlow L
- The Beastie Boys 1989 album Paul's Boutique features a panoramic photograph of Ludlow Street on the cover. The intersection of Ludlow and Rivington streets, where the photo was taken, was renamed “Beastie Boys Square” on September 9, 2023.
- Childish Gambino's song, "L.E.S.", from the 2011 album Camp features the line "Girl crying on Ludlow, she still look good though,".

== See also ==
- Ludlow Street Jail – a Federal prison which stood where Seward Park Campus is now located
