= Rudder ratio =

Relationship between airspeed and rudder deflection

Rudder ratio refers to a value that is monitored by the computerized flight control systems in modern aircraft. The ratio relates the aircraft airspeed to the rudder deflection setting that is in effect at the time. As an aircraft accelerates, the deflection of the rudder needs to be reduced proportionately within the range of the rudder pedal depression by the pilot. This automatic reduction process is needed because if the rudder is fully deflected when the aircraft is in high-speed flight, it will cause the plane to sharply and violently yaw, or swing from side to side, leading to loss of control and rudder, tail and other damages, even causing the aircraft to crash.

== See also ==
- American Airlines Flight 587
