= Jonny Porkpie =

American burlesque writer, director, and performer (born 1974)

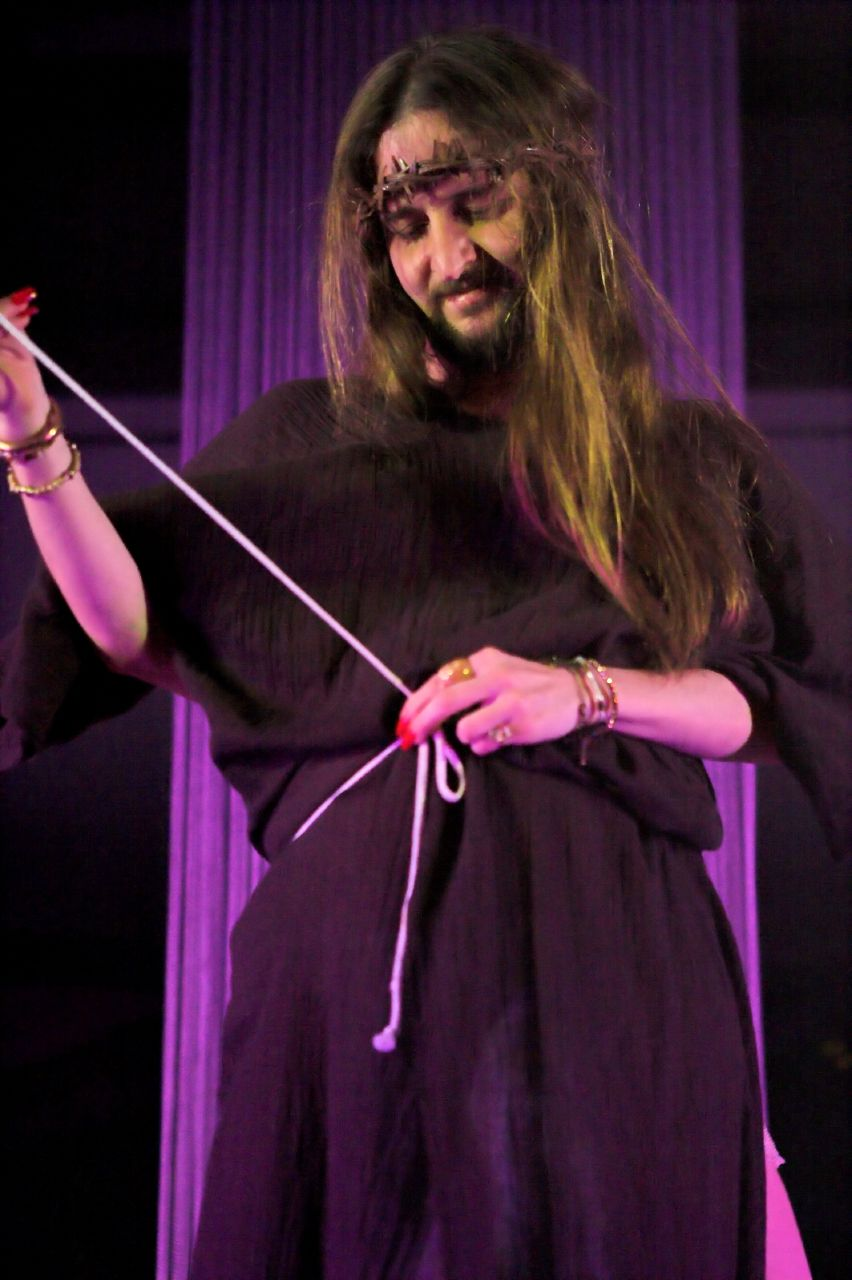
Jonny Porkpie performing at the Miss Exotic World Pageant 2008

Jonny Porkpie (born 1974) is a New York City-based writer, director, and performer in neo-burlesque. So called for his pork pie hat, Jonny Porkpie writes theatrical burlesque shows as part of his production company, Pinchbottom, as well as solo productions under the title "Porkpie International" and is the creator and host of the touring burlesque-tinged game show Grab My Junk, which has toured the United States, New Zealand, Australia, Canada, and England. His work has been touted in New York Magazine as the "best burlesque" in the city. He has of late been highlighted as a pivotal player in New York City's burlesque renaissance in media covering the phenomenon. Porkpie's claim that he is the Burlesque Mayor of New York City has recently been validated by the press. In 2010, New York Press named him New York's "Best Naked Impresario".

== Life ==
He was born in New York City, is an Ivy League graduate with a degree in Visual Art who is of Dutch/Jewish ancestry, and is a member of an old theatrical family. Porkpie was married to Nasty Canasta, a fixture in the city's burlesque circuit; the two later divorced.

On August 3, 2009, he announced his candidacy for "actual" mayor of New York City, targeting "The Naked Cowboy" as his main opponent. He lost.

He is the author of The Corpse Wore Pasties, a burlesque murder mystery which was released by Hard Case Crime in December 2009.
