= The Present Company =

The Present Company is a theater company in New York City and the producing organization of the New York International Fringe Festival.
