= Folies Bergere at The Tropicana Hotel Las Vegas =

Las Vegas showgirl revue (1959–2009)

Les Folies Bergere
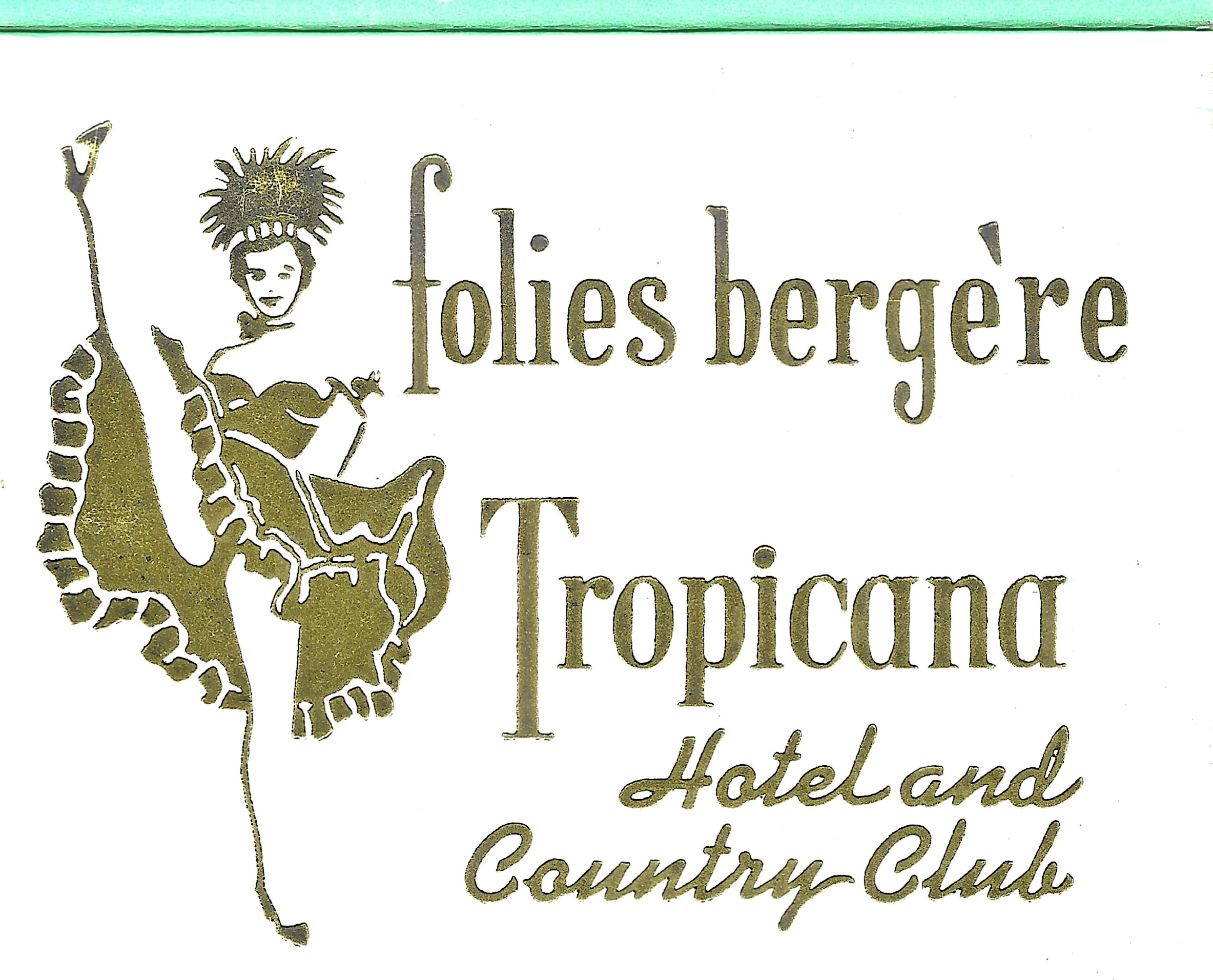
- Folies Bergere matchbook cover
- Genre: Musical revue
- Show type: Permanent In-house production
- Date of premiere: December 24, 1959
- Final show: March 28, 2009
- Location: Tropicana Las Vegas

Creative team
- Created, Directed, Choreographed By: Jerry Jackson
- Produced for the Tropicana & Entertainment Director: Ari Levin
- Entertainment Manager & Production Coordinator: Elaine Celario
- Company Manager: Stephanie Shaw
- Costume Designer: Jerry Jackson
- Scenery Designed By: Jerry Jackson, Charles Lisanby & Bill Morris
- Lighting Designer: Robert Pick
- Original Music & Lyrics By: Jerry Jackson
- Musical Orchestrations By: Albie Berk, Doug Walters, Greg Bosler, Billie Reddie, Jeffrey Silverman, Don Hanna, Billy Tragresser & George Wilkins
- Musical Arrangers: Jerry Jackson, Ron Simone, Greg Bosler
- Assistant Choreographers: Soozi Childers, Tim Shaw; Tango: Miriam LaRici, Hugo Patyn
- Head Carpenter: Phil Jaynes
- Head Sound Technician: Louie Maldonado
- Head Electric Technician: Robert Pick
- Head Prop Technician: Nicolienne Francois

Other information
- Head Flyman: David Friedland
- Scenic Fabrication: A & D Scenery and Copper Creek Studios
- Costume Assistant to Mr. Jackson: Maura Peterson
- Wardrobe Supervisor: Diane Bertolaccini
- Line Captains: Janu Tornell, Stephanie Shaw, Lori Marshburn

Les Folies Bergere was a Las Vegas revue presented at the Tropicana Las Vegas from 1959 to 2009, making it one of the longest-running shows in Las Vegas history.

The Folies Bergere revue was derived from the Folies Bergère revue in Paris, with French creative leadership and many cast members involved in its early years.

The Tropicana Las Vegas production followed the format of the original Paris Folies Bergere featuring topless showgirls, chorus line dancers, elaborate stage sets with segments of comedy, magic, acrobats, and animal acts. Costumes, sets, and dance styles for many production numbers were based on historical periods, developed using museum research and consultation with costume design specialists, then adapted to accommodate dance choreography.

The prominence of showgirls in the production contributed to their association with Las Vegas entertainment during this period. In their most active years, showgirls appeared at hotel openings, promotional events, and in print advertising, and were sometimes photographed alongside city officials such as Mayor Oscar Goodman.

The Tropicana produced Folies Bergere during a period when casinos commonly funded large entertainment productions, including some that operated at a loss, to draw visitors to their gaming floors. As casino ownership shifted toward corporate structures in later decades, entertainment divisions were increasingly required to be self-funding, and productions on the scale of Folies Bergere became less common.

== Background ==
The first Folies Bergere of Paris originated in 1869 as a cabaret music hall. The theatre is still in business, and remains a strong symbol of French and Parisian life. It is most notably captured in the painting "A Bar at the Folies Bergère" by French Impressionist artist Édouard Manet.

The theater changed direction during World War I, when there was a new focus on the (frontal) nude female. Michel Gyarmathy, a pre-war Hungarian refugee, became artistic director of the most celebrated Folies Bergere in Paris. "Monsieur Michel," as he was known to his staff, designed the production, involving dozens of sets and more than 1,000 costumes from Parisian couturiers. Gyarmathy recruited female talent to perform in the company along with the acrobats, magicians, singers, tightrope walkers, circus animals, and other cabaret acts that provided variation to the nude main attraction.

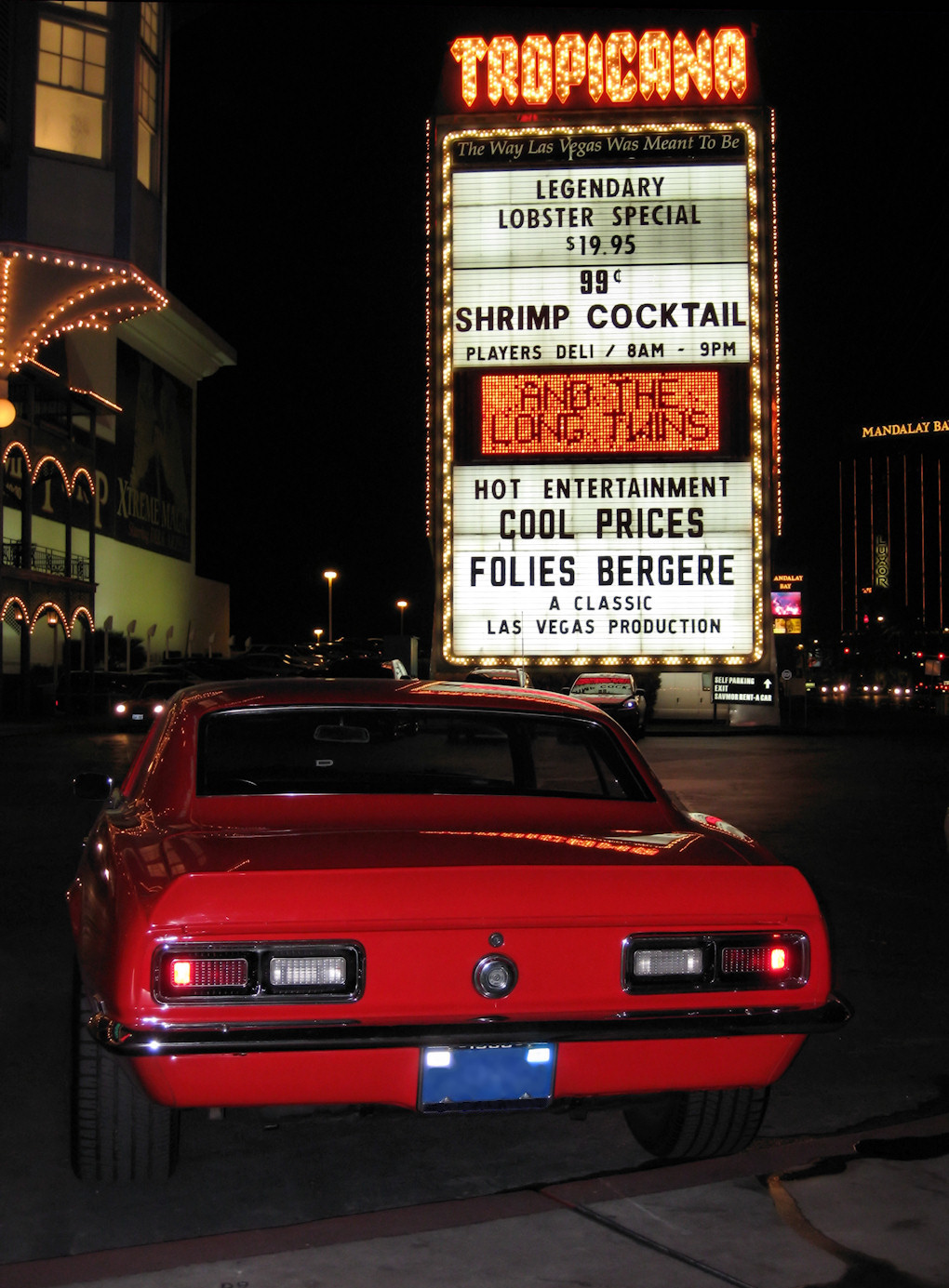
Tropicana marquee featuring Folies Bergere

Gyarmathy was personally involved in replicating the show for the Tropicana in Las Vegas. Although the show was portrayed as "Direct from Paris," half of the showgirls were American due to union agreements.

Ordinarily, a show business career does not offer consistent employment. However, Folies Bergere's longevity offered some stability for cast and staff. Notwithstanding, the cast was subject to regular auditions twice annually, so their positions were not guaranteed. Also, showgirl employment covenants stipulated that they maintain their hiring body weight, have no tan lines and no tattoos. Violations to the excess poundage clause were subject to written warnings in the form of a "Personal Appearance Notice."

Mary Leo, showgirl and line captain for Folies Bergere, shared her experiences during an oral history interview for the University of Nevada Las Vegas, Special Collections. She described how showgirl lifestyles consistently fell into three categories. The first group consisted of married women with a family. For them, being a showgirl was simply a job. They would go home between twice daily performances to tend to their children and were available for the morning routine of getting the kids ready for school. The second group Leo referred to as "Professional Gypsies." These women loved show business, traveling and entertaining. The final group Leo described as the "Come and Go" set. They tended to be more transient and were attracted to the glamor of Las Vegas, wanted to encounter movie stars, and desired to betroth a wealthy man.

Showgirls had a reputation for lacking intelligence, acting immorally, and not being interested in the more traditional long term goals of more stable careers and/or marriage. However, this perception may not have always been true, and in fact this persona was likely perpetuated by the show management's request that showgirls "mix" or mingle with guests after the performance. In fact, former showgirls were generally young when they started performing, and following their Folies Bergere tenure, many pursued university education, obtained professional employment in various fields, and engaged in long-term relationships.

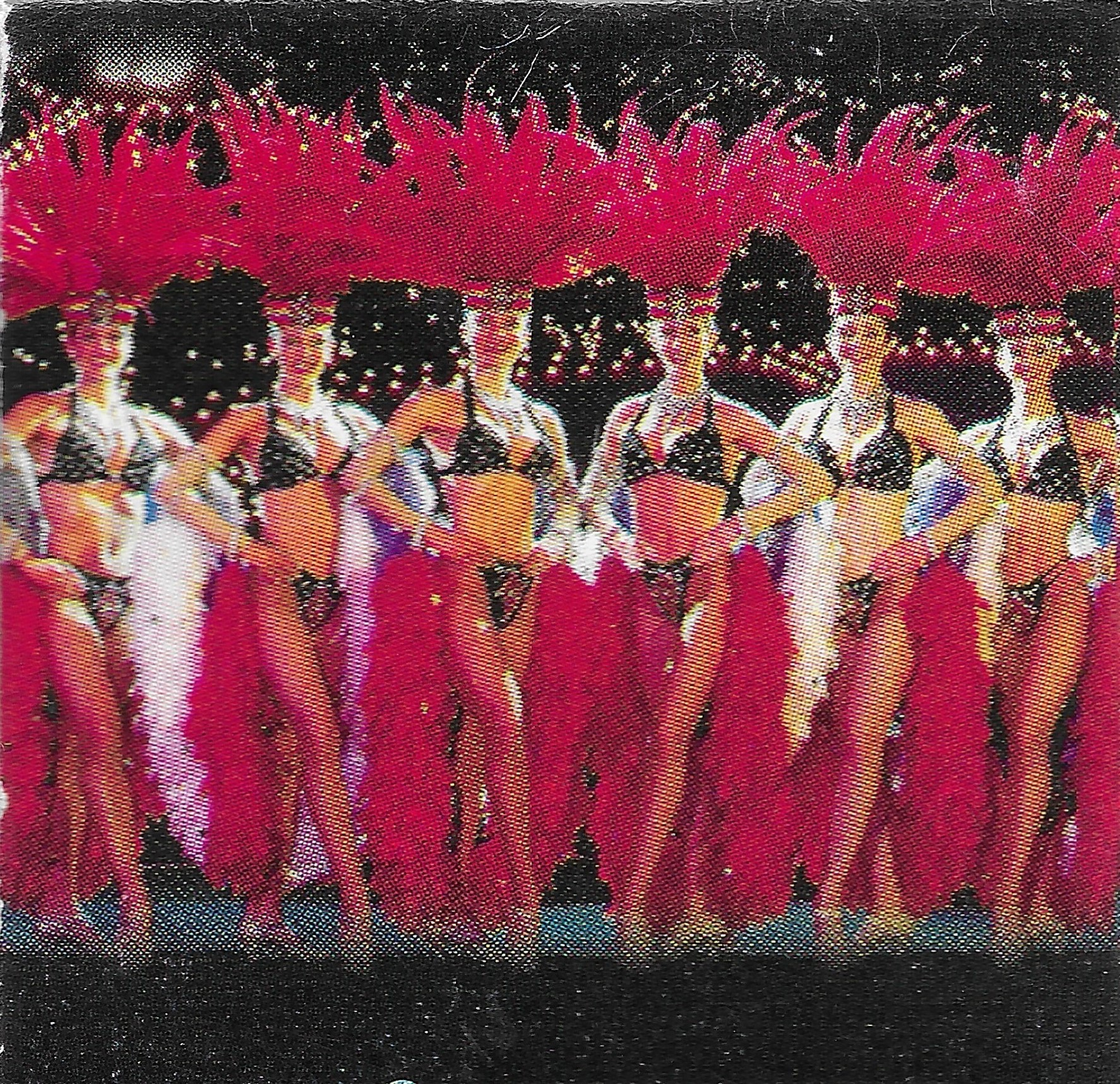
Las Vegas Folies Bergere showgirls at the Tropicana Hotel from matchbook.

Showgirls were typically 5’10"-6’2" (178-188 cm) tall, donned 2-4-inch (5-10 cm) high heeled shoes, headdresses nearing 4 feet (120 cm) tall, and backpacks that supported the tropical plumage display up to a 10-foot (3 m) wingspan. Showgirls needed to have both a dancer's gracefulness and athlete's strength as they showcased their poise by descending the grand staircases and circumnavigating the stage effortlessly with an alluring smile.

Many of the productions and individual scenes had themes based on historical periods. The costumes, sets, and dance styles were researched using museum exhibits along with consultations with experts in garment design and construction techniques. The period apparel was then interpreted and modified to allow for dance movements.

Jerry Jackson, Folies Bergere director from 1975-2009, donated costume sketches, original music compositions, newspaper clippings, photographs and other memorabilia to the UNLV Special Collections that are cited in this article and are available for public viewing on request. The Tropicana Hotel and Casino donated the show's surviving costume stock to the Nevada State Museum, Las Vegas in 2015. This donation included over 8,000 artifacts from the production's nearly 50-year run. Museum exhibitions have displayed costumes, photographs, and design materials from the production.

A worldwide rhinestone shortage in 1981 has been attributed to the 1981 Jubilee! showgirl revue's expansive costume application of the cut glass. The show had ordered all the available rhinestones produced by Swarovski for their outfits and sets.

== History ==
=== The Paris connection ===
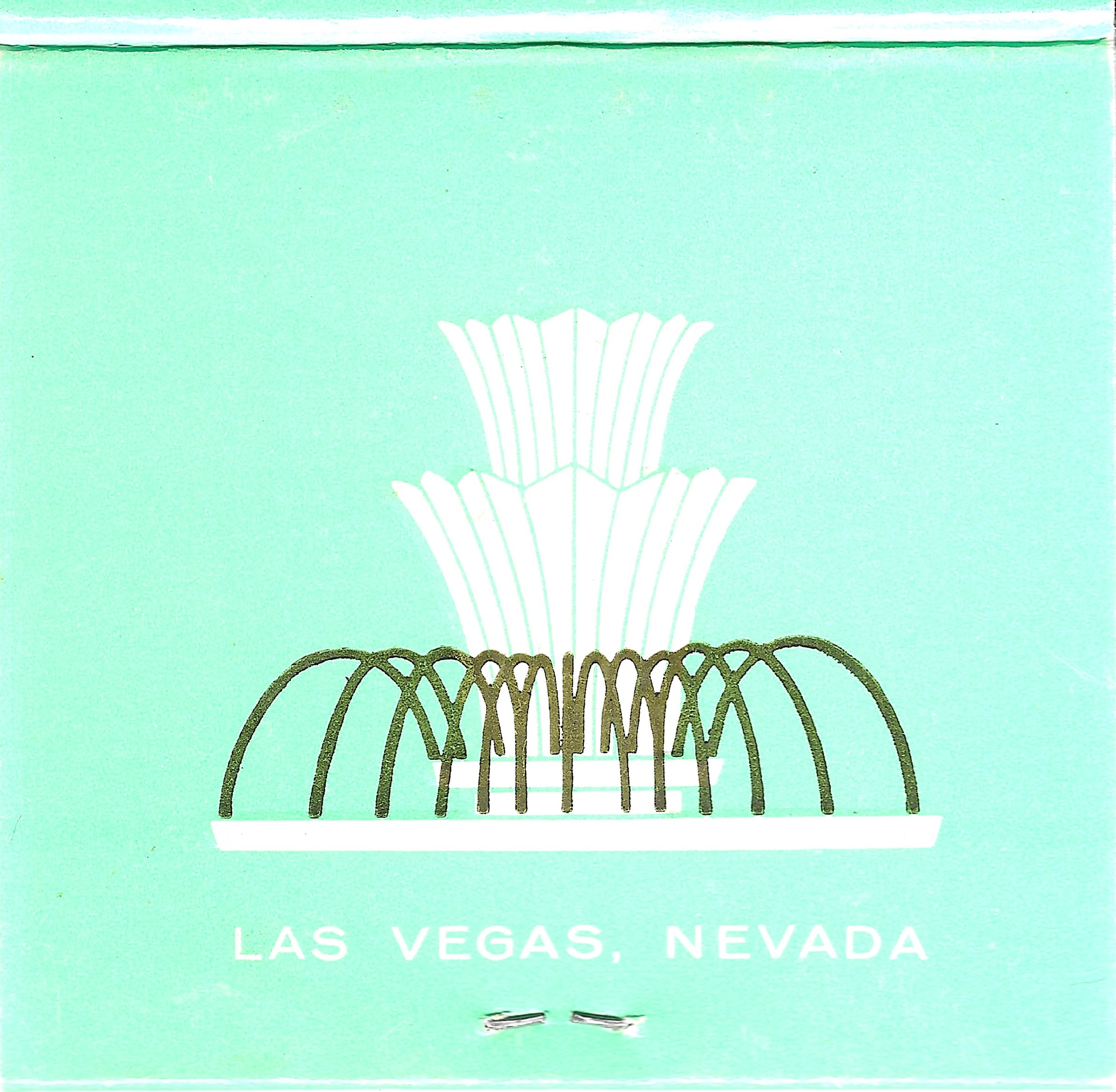
Folies Bergere Tropicana Las Vegas matchbook

J. Kell Housells gained a majority share in the Tropicana in 1959. As owner, one of his first key initiatives was to bring the Folies Bergere to the Tropicana.

The Folies Bergere spectacular was a cause célèbre depicting frontal nudity and provocative dance moves. It is claimed to have had an annual attendance of over 600,000 guests at the height of its popularity. Entertainment director Lou Walters is credited as the individual responsible for securing the rights from Paris for the Tropicana. The Paris Can-can line dance is considered to have made Folies Bergere Paris world renown and was freely adapted for the American audience.

"The Trop," as the hotel was commonly known, attracted celebrity guests including Sammy Davis Jr., Frank Sinatra, and Dean Martin. Some guests reported opportunities to encounter celebrities and performers in the hotel's lounge after performances.

Initially, from 1959 through 1974, the costumes were designed and crafted in Paris for importing to Las Vegas. According to US customs laws, after three years, a duty payment of half the value was due if the items were retained. Another option was to return the costumes to Paris. The chosen alternative was to burn the costumes in the desert under the watchful eyes of the federal officials. Those were sad days for Folies Bergere staff.

Another anecdote was imparted by Lance Burton, a Folies Bergere magician, concerning Siegfried and Roy's first job in Vegas at the Folies Bergere: "They had this cheetah. One time it jumped into the musician's pit. The musicians all went diving for cover. And Siegfried said to the piano player, 'Keep playing – he likes the music.'"

The Folies Bergere was staged at the Hotel Tropicana's Fountain Theatre from 1959 to 1975. Featuring pink architectural accents, furniture, and stage curtains, the venue was nicknamed "the pink room." Raised stage platforms and stairs offered the audience an intimate experience. The open orchestra pit would prove to be so precarious for the performers that, eventually, a preventative net was installed to catch the cast when one of them inadvertently stepped off the stage, slipping into the pit.

Maitre’ds were prepared to show guests to their seats, locating them partially based on the size of the gratuity. Guests frequently wore more formal dress – suits for men and evening dresses for women. Hotel flower girls and cigarette girls roamed the aisles plying their wares. Photographers were on hand and ready to commemorate the occasion.

=== Tropicana in transition ===
In the early 1970s, the Tropicana did not effectively compete with the bigger hotels in Las Vegas. The property had changed hands a few times before Mitzi Stauffer Briggs, heir to the Stauffer Chemical fortune, bought a majority stake in the Tropicana in 1975. At the outset, she was not aware of the uncollectable debt associated with gambling credits. Mob figure Joseph Agosto, owning the rights to Folies Bergere, took advantage of her misfortune by proffering her mob loans in exchange for management involvement. Considering Agosto's criminal past, he would not otherwise be licensable as a casino employee. It would later be discovered that Agosto was siphoning Folies Bergere and casino profits. Due to the association with Agosto, Briggs was forced to sell the Tropicana Hotel to Ramada Inns in December 1979. "The Folies Bergere is really a symbol of the connection between the mob and the Tropicana, via the Folies Bergere," sums up Karan Feder.

By 1975, creative ties were cut with the Folies Bergere of Paris. Jerry Jackson was promoted to Head Director and Choreographer. The costumes for 1975 edition of the American Folies Bergere production were designed by Emmy-award-winner Nolan Miller. The show permanently relocated from the Fountain Theatre to the new Tiffany Theatre within the Tropicana. The revamped version was titled "Le Music Hall". The period theme utilized elaborate sets, exquisite wardrobes, and an ageless symbol of luxury, a 1930s Rolls Royce. Some dancers remembered the Rolls Royce as being an occupational hazard as it leaked oil, causing the floor surface to be tenuous for dance routines.

=== After the mob ===
The legalization of gambling in Atlantic City, New Jersey in 1978 created competition for the Las Vegas casinos. By the 1990s, Las Vegas was experiencing an economic downturn. In an effort to attract more visitors, Las Vegas promoted itself as family-friendly. The Las Vegas campaign targeted the family demographic supported by attractions such as the live pirate ship performance at Treasure Island, the hourly volcano eruption at the Mirage, the Shark Reef Aquarium at Mandalay Bay, and high-powered water cannons choreographed to match accompanying music at the Fountains of Bellagio. The Tropicana was one of the hotels that did not participate in that promotion, choosing "rollers over strollers."

The Folies Bergere was subject to labor action in 1989 as the orchestra's union elected to strike after unsuccessful contract negotiations. Once the live music had stopped, the musicians were replaced with a recorded soundtrack, vacating the orchestra pit from that point forward.

=== Financial decline and closure ===
The Tropicana and its parent company filed for bankruptcy during the 2008 financial crisis. Tropicana was purchased and reorganized under new ownership in 2009, leaving no financial resources to subsidize Folies Bergere and subsequently issue termination notices. On March 28, 2009, cast, crew, and staff took their final curtain call.

Proposed reasons for the decline of Folies Bergere and showgirl revues in general:

- Lack of innovation. There was a desire for something new as showgirl revues appeared dated and old-fashioned.
- Lack of reinvestment. The paucity of ongoing investment was a major factor in longer times between show revisions and less extravagance in the show itself.
- Topless became less of a novelty. Strip clubs and other topless entertainment became ubiquitous in Las Vegas.
- Transition from hotel sponsorship to external financing. "Folies" along with Bally's "Jubilee!," was one of the last in-house productions, in which cast and crew were direct employees of the casino. Most casinos now outsource with third party producers who foot production expenses and compensate team members.
- Faced with competition. A number of shows were available, including five popular Cirque du Soleil shows at that time.
- Tropicana curse. Scott Roeben, a Las Vegas provocateur and pundit, coined this phrase to describe the multiple show failings at the Tropicana.

=== Demolition of the Tropicana ===
Bally's Corporation purchased the Tropicana buildings, and subsequently negotiated an agreement with Oakland Athletics baseball organization to build a stadium complex on the current Tropicana site. The Tropicana was demolished in late 2024.

== Legacy ==
Some street performers in Las Vegas wear costuming modeled on showgirl attire, posing for photographs with tourists for tips, or distributing promotional materials.

=== Art installations ===
The "Folies in Flight" mural, by former Las Vegas performer and artist Terry Ritter, is installed at Harry Reid International Airport and depicts showgirls.

A 50-foot (15 m) showgirl statue, one of the tallest such installations in Las Vegas, stands near the south entrance to the Las Vegas Strip. (Most of the Strip is located within the unincorporated community of Paradise rather than the City of Las Vegas.)

The SlotZilla zipline attraction on Fremont Street features large showgirl figures on either side of its structure.

=== Las Vegas productions ===
Some later Las Vegas shows have drawn on showgirl revue traditions associated with Folies Bergere. Vegas! The Show, produced by David Saxe, features showgirl costuming and staging in a similar style; Saxe has said his mother performed as a Folies Bergere showgirl.

BurlesQ: The Classic Vegas Showgirl Show, presented at the Alexis Park Resort, is directed by Cari Byers, a former Folies Bergere performer (1998–2009).

=== Film and television ===
The 1964 movie Viva Las Vegas, starring Elvis Presley and Ann-Margret, includes a scene filmed in the Tropicana's Fountain Theatre with the Folies Bergere cast.

The television series Designing Women recorded an episode Viva Las Vegas. The plot had Anthony attending the Folies Bergere and falling for the lead singer, Etienne Toussaint. Aired November 6, 1992.

Paris Hilton's My New BFF television show, Season 1, Episode 6, Vegas, Baby! Paris Hilton took the remaining girls to Las Vegas to party, Paris Hilton style. Later, the girls competed in a Folies Bergere stage show.

== Personnel ==
- Hermes Pan was an American dancer and choreographer, principally remembered as Fred Astaire's choreographic collaborator in the acclaimed 1930s movie musicals.
- Michel Gyarmathy became scene and costume designer, art director, manager of and designer of the Folies Bergere of Paris and Las Vegas.
- Vassili Sulich was a ballet master; started Nevada Ballet Theatre (NBT), a regional ballet company.
- Siegfried & Roy were a German-American entertainment duo, best known for their appearances with albino "big cats".
- Lance Burton is an American stage magician performing primarily in Las Vegas.
- Paul Derval was a movie actor and theater manager of Folies Bergere of Paris. He was attributed to founding both the Paris and Las Vegas productions of Les Folies Bergere.
- Nolan Miller was a costume designer for 1975 Edition and Emmy Award nominee.
- The Halassys – Teeterboard Family Act, performed on the Ed Sullivan Show.
- Erich Brenn was a master at the art of plate spinning, appeared on American television variety and talent shows.
- Gus Augspurg & His Girl Friends – Comedy with baboons, seen on American television.
- The Mecners – Acrobats, presented on American television variety shows.
