= Showgirl =

Female performer in a theatrical revue

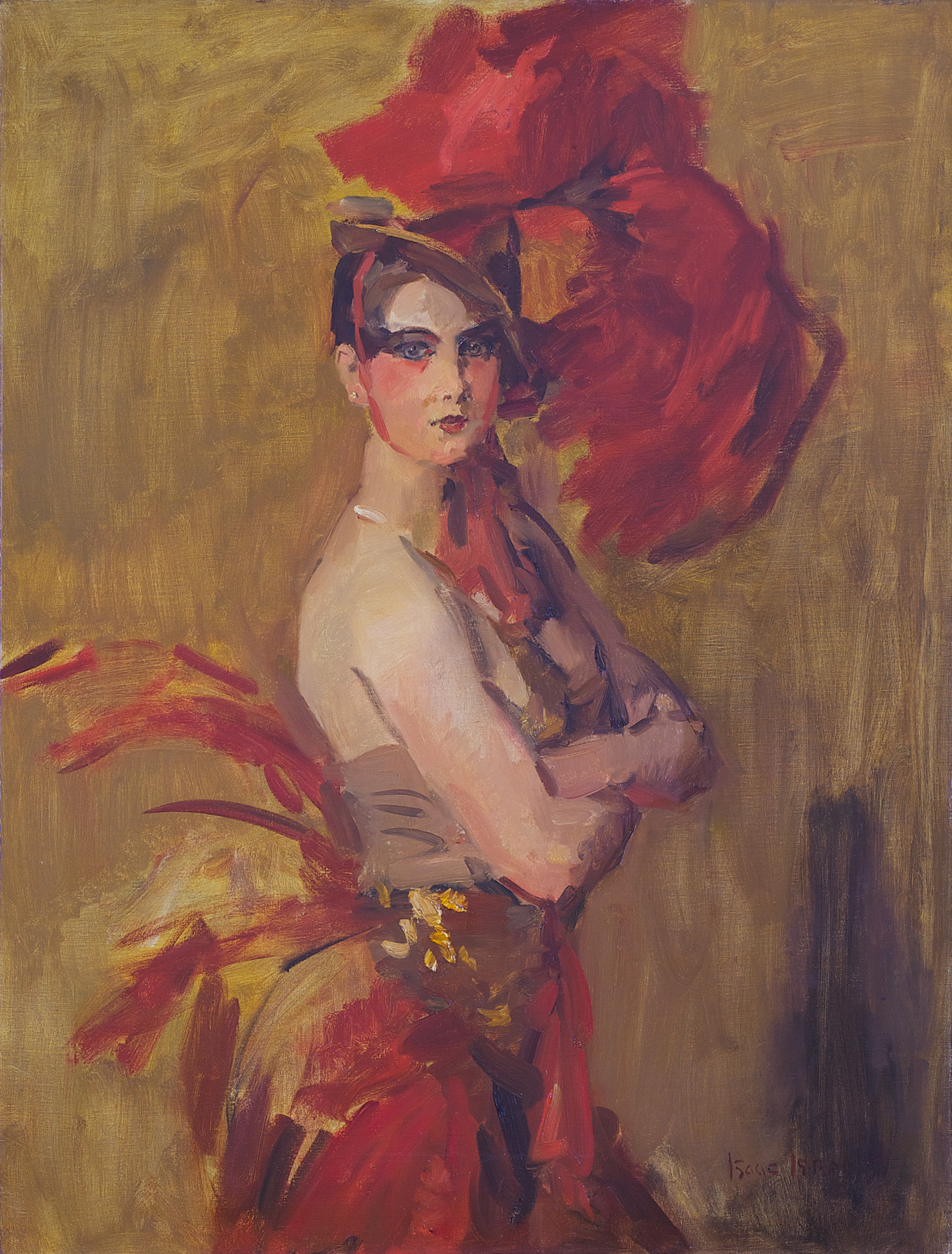
Show-girl (La Cocotte) in Bouwmeester Revue at Scala Theatre, Wagenstraat, The Hague; by Isaac Israëls, 1920s

A showgirl is a female performer in a theatrical revue who wears an exotic and revealing costume and in some shows may appear topless. Showgirls are usually dancers, sometimes performing as chorus girls, burlesque dancers or fan dancers, and many are classically trained with skills in ballet.

The French view the term showgirl as an American idiomatic expression. Some strip clubs and some strippers use the term showgirl as part of their business name.

== History ==
In eighteenth century England, the term showgirl meant a young woman who acted in a showy way to attract male attention, but by the mid-nineteenth century the term had come to mean a singer and dancer in music hall acts.

Showgirls in the modern sense date from the late 1800s in Parisian music halls and cabarets such as the Moulin Rouge, Le Lido, and the Folies Bergère which first featured a nude showgirl in 1918. A popular showgirl dance was the can-can. The trafficking of showgirls for the purposes of prostitution was the subject of a salacious novel by the nineteenth-century French author Ludovic Halévy. The Ziegfeld Follies revue on Broadway introduced showgirls to the United States in 1907, and Busby Berkeley included them in his Hollywood films in the 1930s.

The Bluebell Girls, a dance troupe created by the Irish dancer Margaret Kelly in 1932, performed at the Folies Bergère and Le Lido. By the 1950s there were permanent troupes of Bluebell Girls in Paris and Las Vegas and touring troupes that travelled around the world.

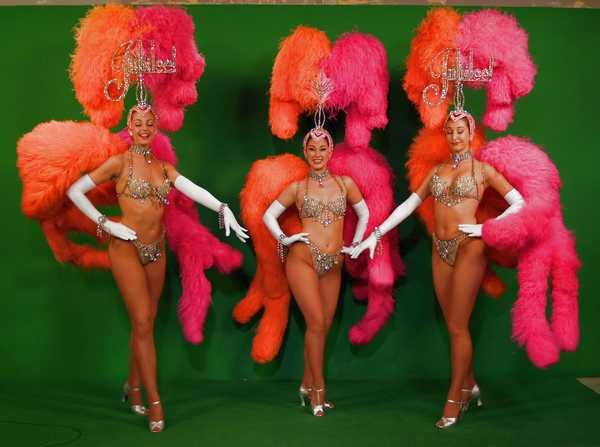
Dancers from the revue show Jubilee! in 2005

The first casino on the Las Vegas Strip to employ dancing girls as a diversion between acts was the El Rancho Vegas in 1941. Showgirls with expensive costumes were presented in Las Vegas in 1952 at the Sands Casino for a show with Danny Thomas. Initially opening and closing for headline acts, sometimes dancing around the headliner, showgirls later moved on to being the main attraction and stars of the show. During the 1950s and 1960s showgirls performed in every hotel and casino on the Las Vegas strip. Competition between casinos led to increasingly lavish shows and costumes. Major shows of the late 1950s included Donn Arden's Lido de Paris show at the Stardust, Jack Entratter’s Copa Girls at the Sands Hotel, and Harold Minsky’s Follies at the Desert Inn. Minsky introduced topless showgirls and these were then incorporated into The Lido de Paris, a show that ran for 31 years. The popularity of showgirl shows in Las Vegas slowly declined after the 1960s, with all of the major shows closing by the early 21st century.

== Revues with showgirls ==
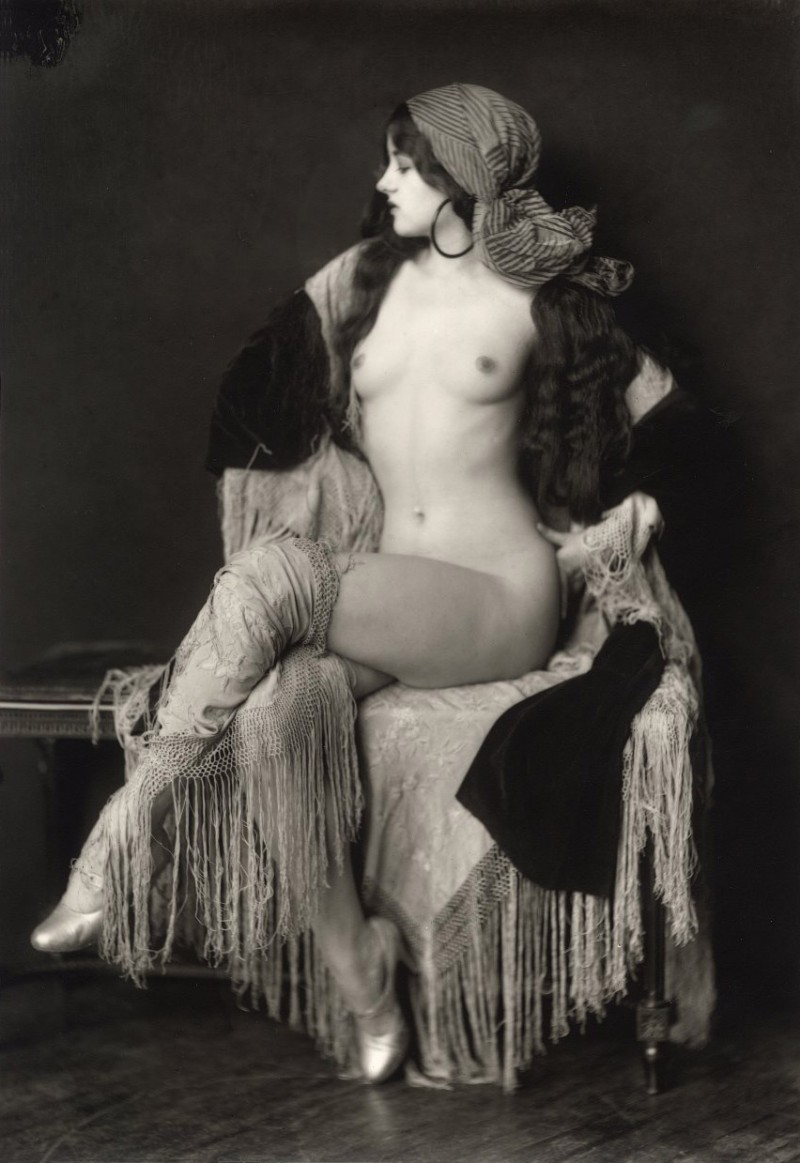
Virginia Biddle, Ziegfeld Follies showgirl, by Alfred Cheney Johnston, 1927

- Ziegfeld Follies (New York)
- Tropicana Club (Havana, Cuba)
- Cabaret Red Light (Philadelphia, US)
- VIVA Cabaret Showbar (Blackpool, UK)
- The Fabulous Palm Springs Follies (with showgirls aged 50 to 80)

Paris

- Folies Bergère
- Le Lido
- Moulin Rouge
- Paradis Latin

Las Vegas

- Folies Bergere at The Tropicana
- Jubilee! Bally's
- Dita Las Vegas (Horseshoe Casino)
- Splash (Riviera Casino)
- 90 Degrees & Rising (Dunes Casino)

== Showgirls in popular culture ==
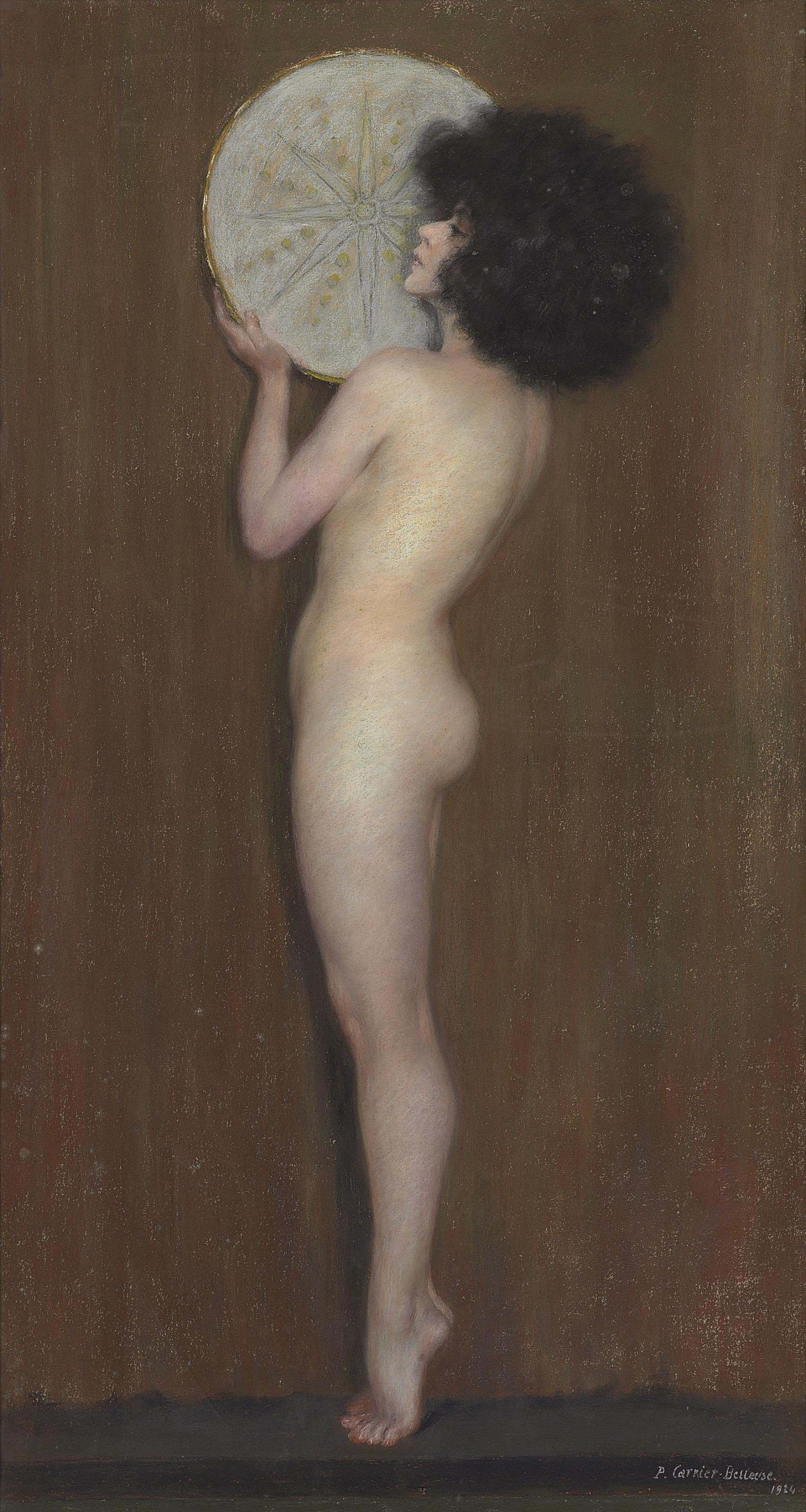
Dancer (1924) by Pierre Carrier-Belleuse

Films

- The Gold Diggers films, including The Gold Diggers (silent, 1923), Gold Diggers of Broadway (1929), Gold Diggers of 1933 (1933), Gold Diggers of 1935 (1935), Gold Diggers of 1937 (1936), and Gold Diggers in Paris (1938)
- Bolero, a 1934 film in which American burlesque dancer Sally Rand plays a carnival showgirl and performs a fan dance.
- Rover Dangerfield a 1991 film features showgirl Connie, Rover's kind-hearted owner.
- Rock-a-Doodle features showgirl/chorus girl Goldie Pheasant.
- Showgirls, a 1995 film directed by Paul Verhoeven and starring Elizabeth Berkley
- Miss Congeniality 2: Armed and Fabulous involves FBI agent Gracie Hart going undercover as a showgirl at the Oasis
- The Last Showgirl, a 2024 film directed by Gia Coppola and starring Pamela Anderson

Stage

- Guys and Dolls, a 1950 Broadway production, depicts a Miss Adelaide as the main character's fiancée, a singer and showgirl in various musical numbers.
- Billboard Argentina features Hall of Fame Showgirl Shelby Doll as digital cover and follows her tour.
- Kylie Minogue was inspired by different types of showgirls and named and styled her Showgirl: The Greatest Hits Tour and Showgirl: The Homecoming Tour concerts after them. Showgirl themes can be seen at many corners through Minogue's entire career.
- Several showgirl cars are seen at the Dinoco booth during the animated film Cars; former Motorama show car Flo displays vanity licence plate SHOGRL as a "Motorama 1957 showgirl".
- Joe Camel 1990s ads feature Las Vegas showgirls

Cartoons

- The Simpsons episodes "138th Episode Spectacular", "Homer's Night Out" and "Bart After Dark" feature showgirls; the last two include recurring character Shauna "Princess Kashmir" Tipton.
- Family Guy's opening sequence had background showgirls until Season 9, when the show's characters Trish Takanawa, Bonnie Swanson, Jillian Russell-Wilcox, Joyce Kinney and Barbara Pewterschmidt began appearing in it as showgirls. In "Whistle While Your Wife Works", Peter Griffin falls on and crushes a background showgirl, only to complain about hurting his foot; and in "Lottery Fever", one showgirl confronts him about getting her pregnant and ghosting her.
- Pokémon episode "The March of the Exeggutor Squad" features showgirls at the Kanto carnival. Magician Melvin's assistant Darla wears a Vulpix-themed showgirl outfit, and Misty Williams wears a Goldeen-themed one.
- South Park episode The Death Camp of Tolerance has Herbert Garrison dress up as a showgirl at an award ceremony in an attempt to get fired and then sue for discrimination.
- My Little Pony Tales episode And the Winner Is... shows Clover Bloom singing "The Choice I Ought to Make", where her friends Melody, Starlight, Patch, Bright Eyes, Sweetheart and Bon Bon dance in a kick line and form a pyramid, wearing garters and feathers in their manes.

TV

- I Love Lucy episode Lucy Gets into Pictures has Lucy Ricardo attempt to play a showgirl who gets shot in a movie, but the oversized headdress keeps knocking her down.
- The Golddiggers, a troupe that performed on The Dean Martin Show beginning in 1968

Music

- Showgirl: The Greatest Hits Tour, the 2005 concert tour of Australian singer Kylie Minogue
- The Life of a Showgirl, the twelfth studio album of American singer-songwriter Taylor Swift

== See also ==
- Nudity in live performance
- Vedette (cabaret)
- Chorus line
