= Lou Walters =

American theater producer

- Born: Louis Abraham Warmwater; January 26, 1894; Tower Hamlets, London, England
- Died: August 15, 1977 (aged 83); Miami, Florida, U.S.
- Occupations: Booking agent, producer, nightclub founder
- Years active: 1910s–1965
- Spouse: Dena Seletsky (m. 1920)
- Children: 3, including Barbara

Louis Edward Walters (January 26, 1894 – August 15, 1977) was a British-born American booking agent, theatrical producer and the founder of the famed Latin Quarter nightclub in New York. He was the father of journalist Barbara Walters.

== Early life ==
Lou Walters was born in Whitechapel, Tower Hamlets, London, on January 26, 1896, as Louis Abraham Warmwater to Abraham Isaac Warmwater (né Waremwasser) and Lillian Schwartz. He was one of 7 children, and the eldest son. As a child, he lost one of his eyes in an accident, and thereafter wore a glass eye. Abraham Warmwater was a tailor, and during a strike in the clothing business in 1906, he moved the family to Belfast. Three years later, Isaac and his sons moved to New York, with his wife and daughters following seven months later. There, the family changed their surname to Walters.

Lou Walters found a job working as an office boy at a vaudeville booking office, and soon began booking acts himself. By his early 20s, Walters had opened his own booking agency in Boston, Massachusetts. His business originally booked only vaudeville acts, but as the popularity of vaudeville declined, he branched out to book acts into nightclubs and supper clubs. According to the memoir of his daughter Barbara, Walters discovered comedians Fred Allen and Jack Haley.

Walters was not an imposing man, standing at only 5'4" and weighing about 125 lbs. In 1920, he married Dena Seletsky in Boston. Over the next ten years, they had three children: Burton, who died of pneumonia as a toddler, Jacqueline, who had a mental disability (died from ovarian cancer in 1988), and Barbara, a television journalist and anchor.

== Latin Quarter ==
In 1937, Walters opened his first nightclub, Latin Quarter, with a partner, E.M. Loew. The venture took his entire savings; on opening night he had only 63 cents to his name. The club was very successful, and within three years was grossing more than $500,000 per year. Walters moved his family to Miami Beach, Florida, where he took over the Palm Island Club from Earl Carroll and relaunched it as another Latin Quarter. Two years later, in 1942, Walters opened a Latin Quarter nightclub on Times Square in New York City. The club was extremely popular, and in its first year grossed over $1.5 million. Over 5 million people visited the nightclub during its first ten years in operation.

Walters's nightclubs were known for their luxurious atmosphere and good food. Walter once told an interviewer that "'It's a popular fallacy in this business ...to say that your money is made or lost in the kitchen. The man who goes to a nightclub goes in a spirit of splurging, and you've got to splurge right along with him.'" The nightclubs offered three shows per evening, each featuring some of the top talent of the time, including Milton Berle, Frank Sinatra, Mae West, and Mickey Rooney, mixed with performances by chorus girls. The chorus girls were cast after auditions in London, Paris, and major cities in the United States. The dancers wore skimpy costumes designed by leading fashion designers, including Erté. During this time, Walters branched into producing theatrical shows. In 1943, Walters produced a successful revival of the Ziegfeld Follies on Broadway, which ran for 553 performances. He produced two other Broadway shows, Artists and Models, and Star Time, but neither were popular.

== Cafe de Paris ==
Walters sold his share of the Latin Quarter chain to Loew in 1956 for $500,000. He was convinced that he could recreate his success with a new chain of clubs called Cafe de Paris. He opened the first in Miami in 1957. A combination of a poor national economy and an unusually frigid Miami winter resulted in a sharp decline in the number of tourists who visited Miami that year. The Miami club failed to attract enough visitors and closed after its first season.

A second version of the Cafe de Paris opened in New York in May 1958, in the former Arcadia Ballroom. It was the largest nightclub in New York, able to seat 1,200 people. Both of the Cafe de Paris locations were very close to the existing Latin Quarter nightclubs. Loew won an injunction that prevented Walters from advertising his ownership of either of the Cafe de Paris nightclubs. Although opening week was successful, the club was too large, and the rent too high, for Walters to cover his expenses. Facing bankruptcy, Walters attempted suicide in June 1958. His family covered this up, convincing the press that Walters had only had a heart attack.

Following his release from the hospital, Walters moved his family back to Miami. All of their assets in New York were seized to pay creditors. Walters was also sued by New York for failing to pay income or payroll taxes while he operated the Cafe de Paris. The court case lasted two years, and Walters began missing court appearances, claiming he did not have the funds to travel to New York. A judge issued a warrant for his arrest. According to the memoir of Walters' daughter Barbara, she contacted her friend, powerful attorney Roy Cohn, to let him know about the charges, and within a week the charges were dropped and the case was settled.

== Las Vegas ==
In Miami, Walters regained his equilibrium. The Hotel Deauville hired him to produce their nightly shows. That work led to an offer from the Tropicana Las Vegas to manage their stage shows as Entertainment Director. At the Tropicana, he introduced the Folies Bergère to Las Vegas. This was the first time the Folies had been licensed outside of Paris. The Folies Bergere at The Tropicana Hotel Las Vegas became the longest running theatrical production in the world. Walters later produced entertainment for the Casino de Paris in Lake Tahoe, Nevada. In 1965, Walters returned to managing the Latin Quarter chain, now as an employee rather than owner.

== Death and legacy ==
Walters retired in 1967. He died of a heart attack in Miami on August 15, 1977. In 1978, the Boston Center for the Arts named a rehearsal hall for Walters.

In 2006, New York City renamed a street near the old Latin Quarter nightclub "Lou Walters Way".
