= Latin Quarter (nightclub) =

Nightclub in New York City

The LQ
- Latin Quarter logo from the 1960s
- Interactive map of The LQ
- Full name: Latin Quarter
- Address: 511 Lexington Ave
- Location: Manhattan, New York City
- Coordinates: 40.755092°N 73.973206°W

Construction
- Opened: 1942
- Reopened: 2003

Website
- www.lqny.com

The Latin Quarter (also known later on as The LQ) was a nightclub in New York City. The club originally opened in 1942 and featured big-name acts. In recent years, it had been a focus of hip hop, reggaeton and salsa music. Its history is similar to that of its competitor, the Copacabana.

== Times Square location ==
The club's original location near Times Square was at 200 West 48th Street on a trapezoidal lot between Broadway and Seventh Avenue. It opened as the Palais Royale in 1900, and Norman Bel Geddes had designed the interior. It was then occupied by the Cotton Club, which had left Harlem, from 1936 to 1940.

=== Original Latin Quarter nightclub ===
Concert promoter Lou Walters bought the Cotton Club and reopened it in 1942 as the Latin Quarter, with a French New Orleans theme. He was the father of television journalist, host and producer Barbara Walters.

During Walters's tenure, the club featured big-name acts such as Frank Sinatra, Ella Fitzgerald, Patti Page, the Carter Family, Sophie Tucker, Mae West, Diahann Carroll, Milton Berle, The Andrews Sisters, Frankie Laine, Sunny Skylar, and Ted Lewis, along with chorus girls and a can can dance to conclude.

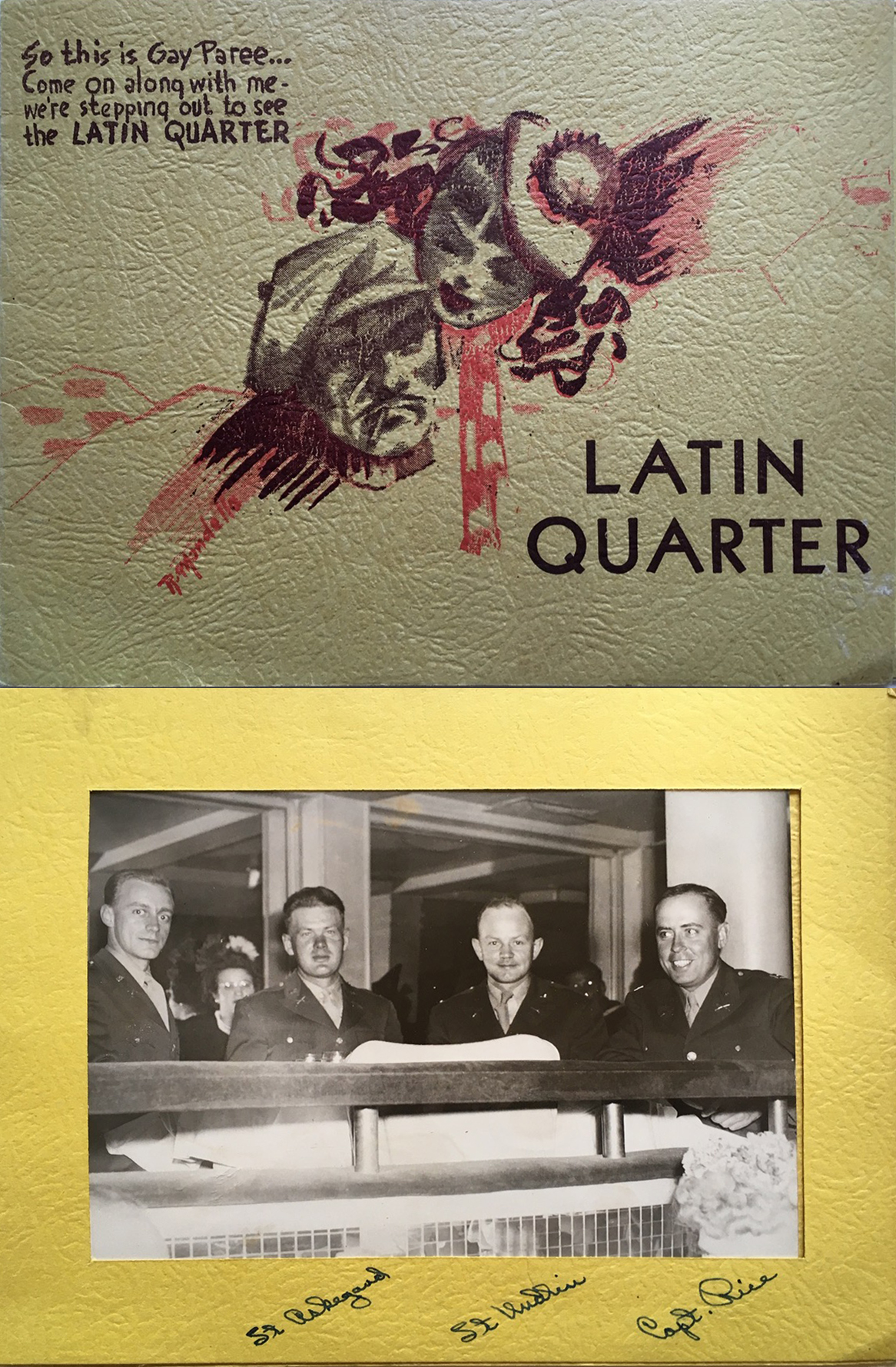
US Army officers enjoy a night on the town at the Latin Quarter in New York City before they ship out during World War II.

Walters left the business in the 1950s. Earl Wilson described the club under its new management in 1964 as "more expensive" than the Copacabana "but then the show's a bit bigger, nakeder and longer."

In 1969, during a strike by the chorus girls, the club was padlocked for not paying rent.

=== Cine Lido ===
From 1969 to 1978, the upstairs room was a 575-seat Cine Lido that initially started showing upscale soft pornography. It opened with the film Camille 2000 (1969). On July 25, 1973, Cine Lido, along with 10 other New York "art houses", was raided, and a copy of The Newcomers was confiscated. Cine Lido closed in May 1978 and was replaced by the 22 Steps disco, which was named for the number of steps to the theatre.

=== Broadway theatre ===
In 1979, the space reopened as a Broadway theatre called 22 Steps with performances of Coquelico, My Old Friends, The Madwoman of Central Park West, and Dogg's Hamlet, Cahoot's Macbeth.

From 1980 to 1984, it was named the Princess Theatre and had performances of Censored Scenes from King Kong, Fearless Frank, The Beautiful Mariposa, Sort of an Adventure, Louie and the Elephant, This Was Burlesque, Pump Boys and Dinettes and The Babe.

From 1984 to 1985, the theatre was renamed Latin Quarter and had performances of André DeShield's Harlem Nocturne and Mayor.

=== Return to nightclub use ===
After 1985, the space returned to nightclub use and focused on hip hop music. Boogie Down Productions referenced the club in their 1987 song "Super Ho". Ice-T also referenced the club in his songs 6 in the Mornin' (1987) and "Heartbeat" (1988). Also, Slick Rick made referenced to the club in his song "The Moment I feared" (1988) from the album The Great Adventures of Slick Rick. Public Enemy also references 'the LQ' in their 1988 song "Don't Believe the Hype". In 1987, three patrons were shot as they left the club after a performance by Roxanne Shante.

Later, the club was renamed the Penguin Club and became infamous for stabbings and fights. The building was eventually torn down in 1989 and replaced by a 22-story Ramada Renaissance Hotel. 48th Street between Broadway and Seventh Avenue now bears the honorary name "Lou Walters Way."

== Lexington Avenue nightclub ==
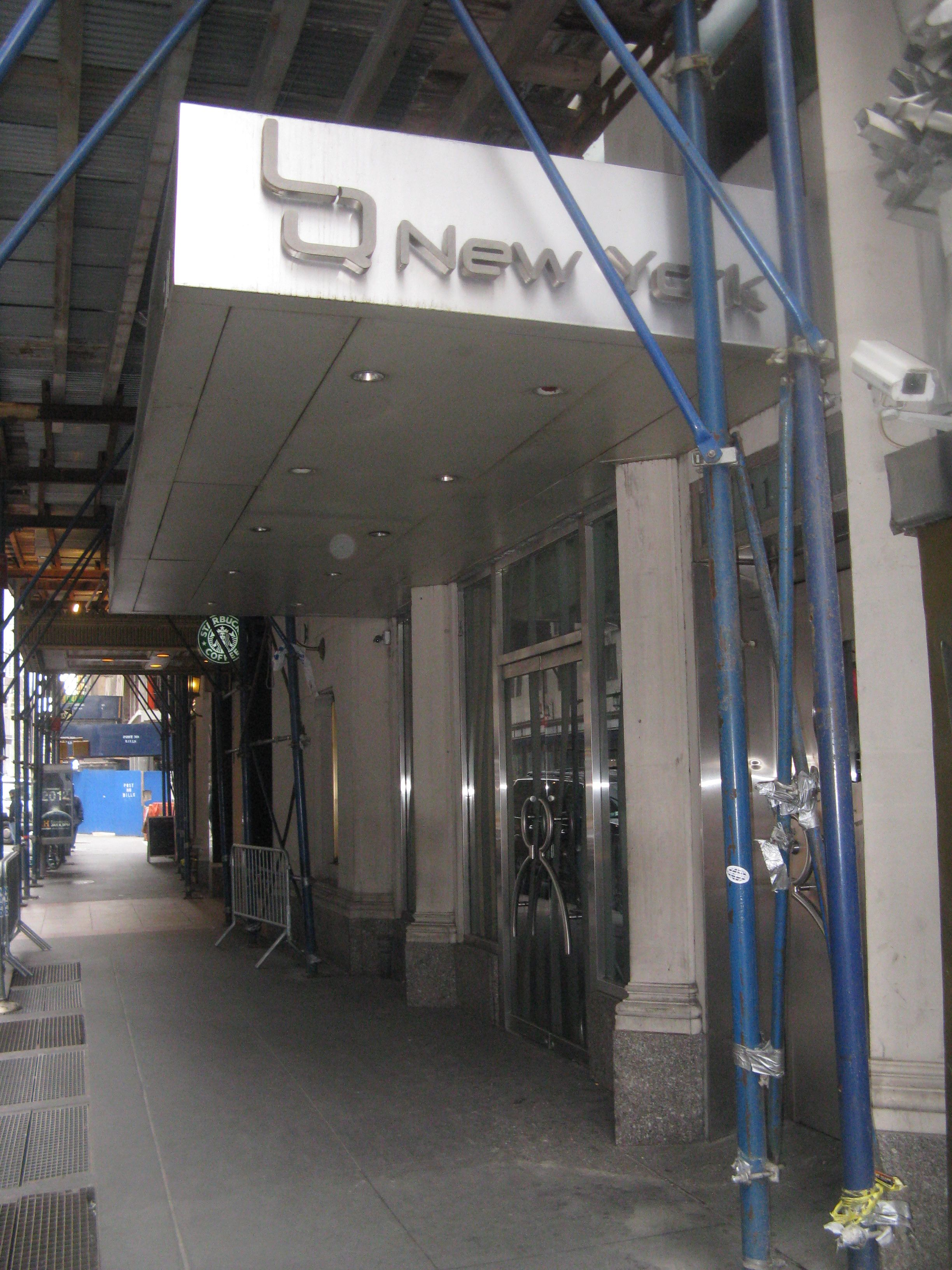
LQ in January 2009

In 2003, the producer Ralph Mercado (who had founded RMM Records & Video) opened a new Latin Club at 511 Lexington, at 48th Street, in the Radisson Lexington Hotel on the East Side. Although still known as the Latin Quarter, signage at the club referred to it as "LQ". In December 2004, a fight at the club, during a Ja Rule holiday party, spilled onto the street, and one man was fatally shot and another wounded in a dispute that reportedly involved associates of the Inc. Records.

On November 29, 2008, the former New York Giants and Pittsburgh Steelers football player Plaxico Burress accidentally shot himself in the right leg while he was standing in an elevator vestibule between the VIP room and the coat check. Burress pleaded guilty to charges and received a two-year prison sentence. Events led to a Manhattan Community Board 6 recommendation not to renew the club's liquor license.
