= Donn Arden =

American choreographer and producer

Donn Arden (1916 or 1917 – November 2, 1994) was an American choreographer and producer.

== Biography ==
Donn Arden was born as Arden Carlyle Peterson on July 17, 1915, in Annawan, Illinois, and grew up in St. Louis.

By the age of nine he was already making money with dancing; he was considered a good tap dancer.

Arden never married, although he had been engaged in his younger years.

== Career ==
Arden studied dancing with Robert Alton, who later became a Broadway director.

In the early '30s, Arden won a local Charleston contest, along with a St. Louis girl named Ginger Rogers.

Donn Arden and the Artists Models (two sets of female twins) added ten women and became a house line, staying three for four years at a time at the same vaudeville house, putting together house lines, at peak, for twelve theaters.

During World War II, Arden produced shows for American armed forces.

In 1948, Le Lido in Paris brought Arden to France to work with producers Pierre-Louis Guerin and Rene Fraday.

Donn Arden's Las Vegas showgirl image — a statuesque dancer in sequins, feathers and wearing a tall headpiece, derives from Margaret Kelly's Bluebell Girls of the Parisian Folies Bergère and Le Lido.

In the 1950s and 1960s Arden had shows concurrently in Paris, New York (Latin Quarter nightclub), New Jersey, Miami (Latin Quarter nightclub), Los Angeles (Moulin Rouge), and Las Vegas.

In 1950, "the boys" who ran the clubs in Cleveland (the "Cleveland Four," also known as the Cleveland Syndicate, Moe Dalitz, Morris Kleinman, Louis Rothkopf, and Samuel A. Tucker) told Arden about the new property they had invested in: the Desert Inn in Las Vegas, where owner Wilbur Clark brought in former racketeers Moe Dalitz, Morris Kleinman and Sam Tucker when his construction funds ran low.

On April 24, 1950, at the opening of Wilbur Clark's Desert Inn, Arden's dance troupe performed with Edgar Bergen & Charlie McCarthy and Vivian Blaine, and headlined.

In 1958, Arden developed the Lido de Paris show, based on the Parisian revue at Le Lido), which ran eleven editions at the Stardust until 1991.

Arden's other Las Vegas spectaculars included Hello America, Pzazz! 68at the Desert Inn, developed with Frank Sennes and Pzazz! 70.

In 1974, Arden was hired to first do "Hallelujah Hollywood" which featured Siegfried & Roy, then in 1980, Jubilee! at the MGM Grand Hotel and Casino, now Horseshoe Las Vegas. Jubilee! ran for 34 years in the Jubilee! Theatre at Bally's in Las Vegas. The show closed on February 11, 2016, drawing legions of former cast members, designers, and fans.

From June 2, 1978, to April 1989, "Hello Hollywood, Hello!" was a revue, created by Donn Arden and performed on the Ziegfeld Stage at MGM Grand Reno in Reno, Nevada.

== Noteworthy ==
- Actress and model Valerie Perrine started her career with Arden. He remembered her as "a secretary from Scottsdale with a lisp".
- Actress Goldie Hawn is reputed to have been part of his troupe at the Desert Inn but was fired by Arden after only a few weeks. He remembered her as "a skinny fruitcake".
- Bob Mackie was one time costume designer for Donn Arden
- Screenwriter Joseph Stefano, who wrote the Psycho screenplay for Alfred Hitchcock, wrote music and lyrics for Arden's stage shows.
- Ray Vasquez Lead Singer for Donn Arden productions.

== Awards ==
The Las Vegas Chamber of Commerce presented Arden with its first Personality of the Year award in the 1970s.
