= Horseshoe Las Vegas =

Casino hotel in Paradise, Nevada

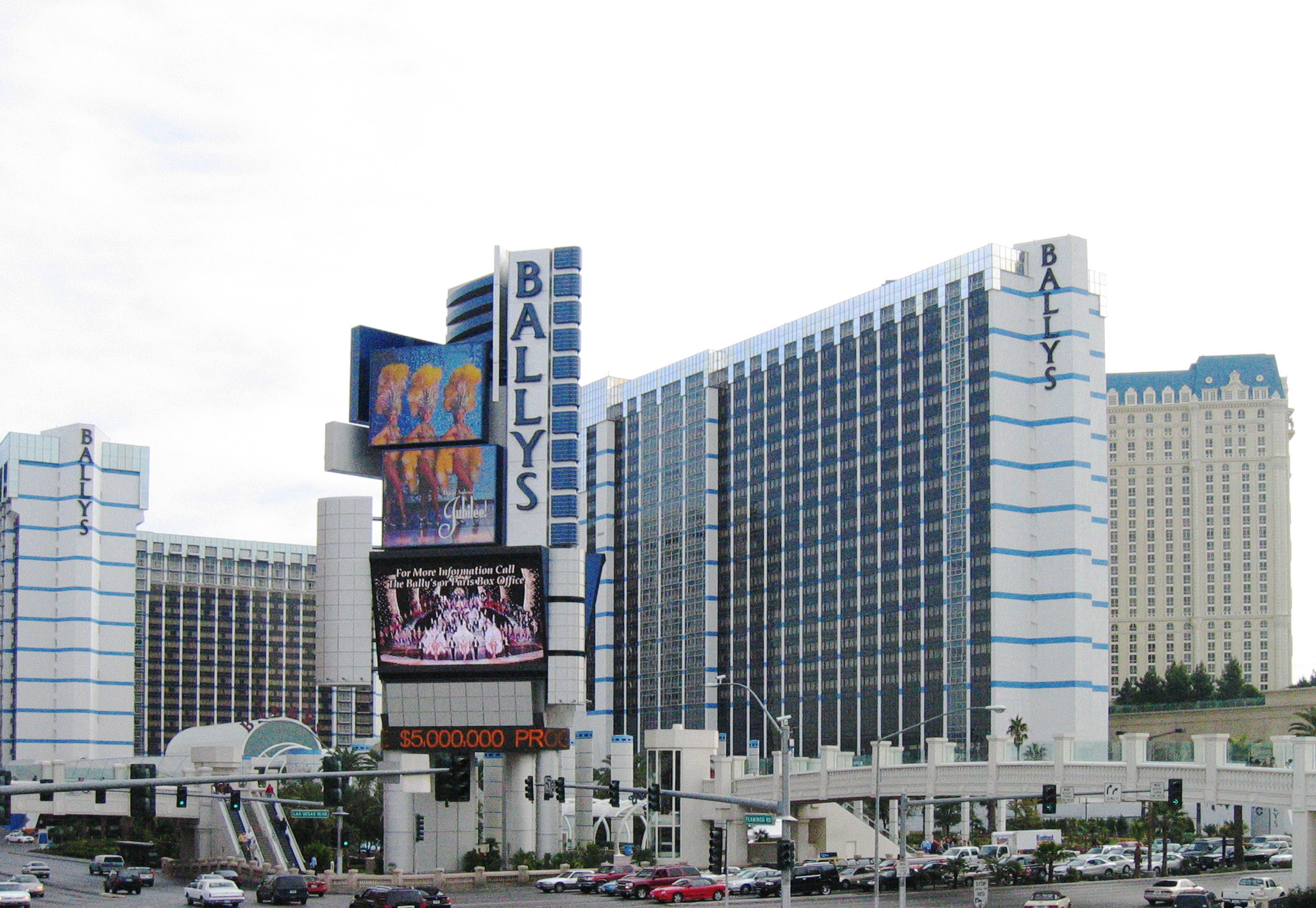
- The resort in the 2000s, then known as Bally's

- Location within Las Vegas Strip Location within Nevada
- Interactive map of Horseshoe Las Vegas
- Location: Paradise, Nevada, U.S.; 3645 South Las Vegas Boulevard; 36°06′50″N 115°10′10″W
- Opened: December 4, 1973; 52 years ago (as MGM Grand)
- Theme: Western
- No. of rooms: 2,056
- Gaming space: 68,375 sq ft (6,352.2 m^{2})
- Permanent shows: Jubilee! (1981–2016); Tony n' Tina's Wedding; Wayne Newton: Up Close and Personal (2016–18); Extravaganza (2020–23); Dita Las Vegas; X Rocks
- Signature attractions: Grand Bazaar Shops
- Notable restaurants: Guy Fieri's Flavortown Sports Kitchen; Jack Binion's Steak
- Casino type: Land-based
- Owner: Caesars Entertainment
- Architect: Martin Stern Jr.
- Previous names: MGM Grand Hotel and Casino (1973–86); Bally's Las Vegas (1986–2022)
- Renovated in: 1981, 1993–95, 2000–01, 2013–15, 2018, 2022–23
- Website: caesars.com/horseshoe-las-vegas

Horseshoe Las Vegas is a casino hotel on the Las Vegas Strip in Paradise, Nevada. It is owned and operated by Caesars Entertainment. It originally opened as the MGM Grand Hotel and Casino on December 4, 1973. The 26-story hotel contained 2,100 rooms and was among the world's largest hotels.

On November 21, 1980, the MGM Grand was the site of one of the worst high-rise fires in United States history, in which 85 people died. The MGM Grand was rebuilt at a cost of $50 million, and eventually reopened on July 29, 1981, with new fire safety features in place. Another 26-story tower opened later that year, adding more than 700 rooms. The resort has a total of 2,812 rooms, and the casino is 68,375 sq ft (6,352.2 m^{2}).

In 1986, Bally Manufacturing purchased the resort and renamed it Bally's Las Vegas. A sister property, Paris Las Vegas, opened next to Bally's in 1999. An outdoor shopping mall, the Grand Bazaar Shops, was added to Bally's in 2015. The resort was home to the long-running Jubilee! theatrical show, which ran from 1981 to 2016.

Following a renovation, Caesars Entertainment rebranded the property as Horseshoe Las Vegas on December 15, 2022. It is named after the original Binion's Horseshoe casino in downtown Las Vegas. In 2023, it was announced that the resort would lose its Jubilee Tower to Paris Las Vegas, thus reducing the number of rooms at Horseshoe. The tower would subsequently be renamed the Versailles Tower. The project concluded in late 2024.

== History ==
Part of the site was once occupied by the Three Coins Motel, which opened in the mid-1960s. The Bonanza, a western-themed hotel and casino, opened in July 1967. It was built in between the Three Coins and the Galaxy Motel, both of which served as the Bonanza's lodging. Because of financial problems, the Bonanza's casino portion closed three months later, although the hotel continued to operate. The hotel had 160 rooms, a small number compared to most resorts on the Las Vegas Strip.

Kirk Kerkorian purchased the Bonanza at the end of 1968, then sold it several months later to a group of investors. The Bonanza reopened in May 1969, after which a dispute occurred between the top two investors regarding management. A legal battle ensued, although the two eventually agreed to a settlement. The Bonanza included a showroom and a theater that screened classic films. The casino became popular for its country music acts, and singer Buck Owens made his Las Vegas Strip debut there in 1969. There had been plans to add a high-rise hotel building, although this did not materialize. In 1970, Kerkorian filed a foreclosure action against the owners and regained control of the Bonanza.

=== MGM Grand Hotel and Casino (1973–1986) ===
Kerkorian's company, Metro-Goldwyn-Mayer (MGM), purchased the Bonanza and adjacent land in December 1971. MGM had plans to build a resort complex on the property named MGM's Grand Hotel, after the 1932 MGM film Grand Hotel. A groundbreaking ceremony with celebrities was held on the 43-acre (17 ha) property on April 15, 1972. The hotel tower was topped off in early 1973, and the Bonanza was demolished that year.

The MGM Grand Hotel had a low-key opening on December 4, 1973. A grand-opening ceremony, with celebrity appearances, was held the following night. Many stars who had appeared in MGM films were in attendance. Dean Martin provided entertainment for the grand opening, although his performance and lack of new material were criticized. Kerkorian had previously wanted Frank Sinatra to perform for the hotel's opening.

The MGM Grand was designed by architect Martin Stern Jr., and it was considered luxurious. It included hundreds of chandeliers, statues, and columns made of marble. The resort's design was based on grand hotels that were common in Europe during the early 20th century. The MGM Grand cost $106 million. The hotel was 26 stories and contained 2,100 rooms. It was among the world's largest hotels. The MGM Grand also had the world's largest casino, which included 923 slot machines, and a keno lounge. Live jai alai was also located on the property for betting. The resort also had shops, eight restaurants, 25 bars, a movie theater which initially showed only classic MGM films, five entertainment lounges, and 145,000 sq ft (13,500 m^{2}) of convention space.

A few days after the opening, character actor Chill Wills, who had been a contract player for Metro-Goldwyn-Mayer during the 1940s, became the first person to get married at the new resort. The resort cost $30 million more than anticipated, and within weeks of its opening, it was announced that finishing touches on the resort would raise the $106 million cost by another $20 million. There were reports that the resort had financial problems and that it could soon be sold, although MGM retained ownership into the 1980s.

==== Fire and reopening ====
On November 21, 1980, the MGM Grand suffered a fire that started in a casino restaurant. It was one of the worst high-rise fires in United States history, killing 85 people. Smoke traveled up into the hotel tower, killing most of the victims. The fire made such an impact on hotel safety that it led to the implementation of fire safety improvements worldwide. The fire forced the temporary closure of the resort. State gaming revenues were hurt by the closure, as the MGM was one of the largest tax contributors to the local gaming industry. The county lost an estimated $1.7 million because of the closure.

Earlier in 1980, construction had begun on an additional hotel tower. Construction resumed shortly after the fire. Over the next eight months, the other MGM Grand facilities were rebuilt at a cost of $50 million, which included the implementation of new fire safety features. As the reopening approached, the resort saw strong demand in its convention bookings.

The MGM Grand held a low-key reopening on July 29, 1981, followed by an official opening the next day. Both opening days lacked any large-scale festivities. A hotel spokesman said, "It would seem inappropriate, in terms of what happened in November, to have a grand celebration." When it reopened, the resort's casino area included 50,000 sq ft (4,600 m^{2}). The new hotel tower was expected to be finished in September 1981. The tower added more than 700 rooms. Like the original tower, the new one also stood 26 stories high.

=== Bally's (1986–2022) ===
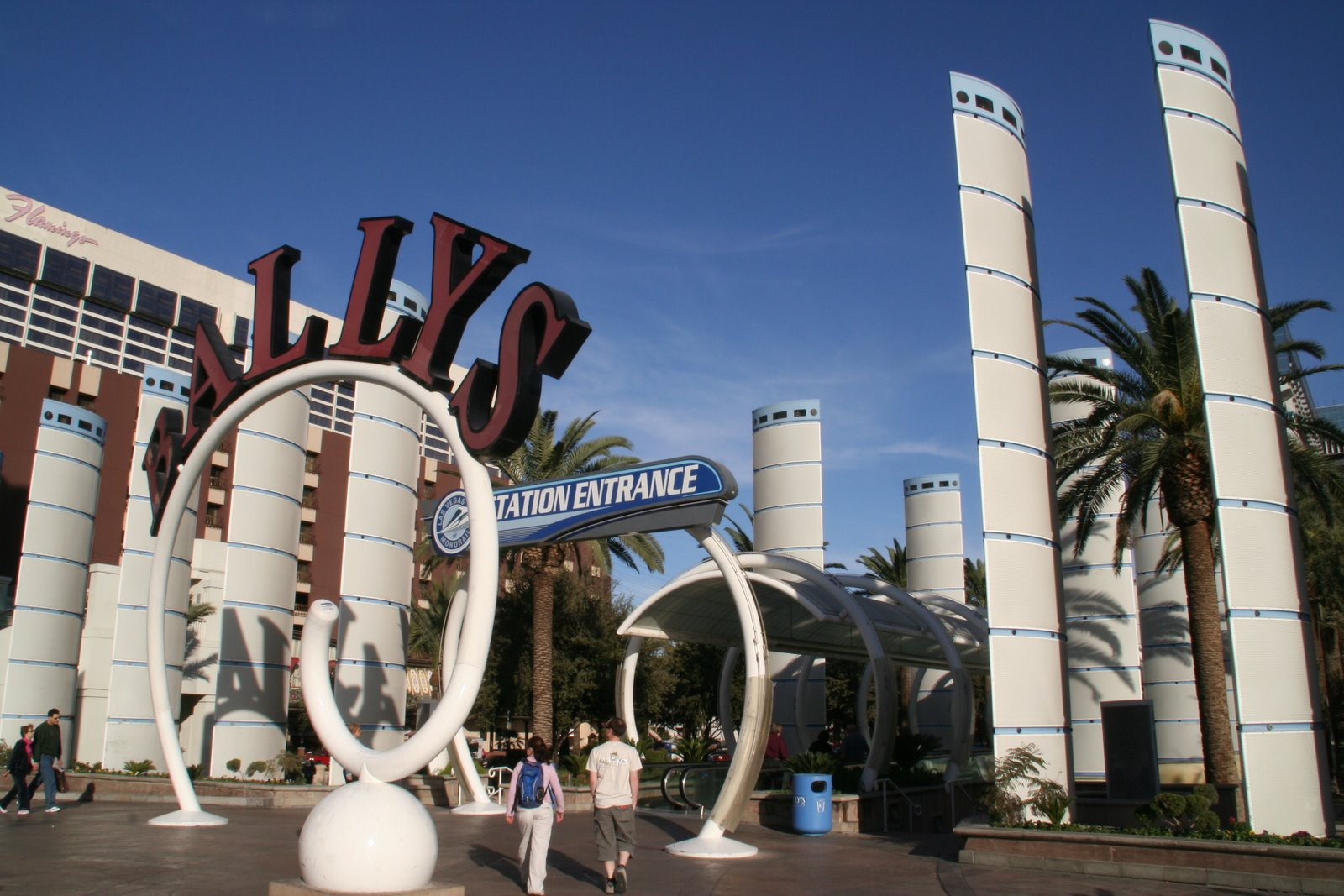
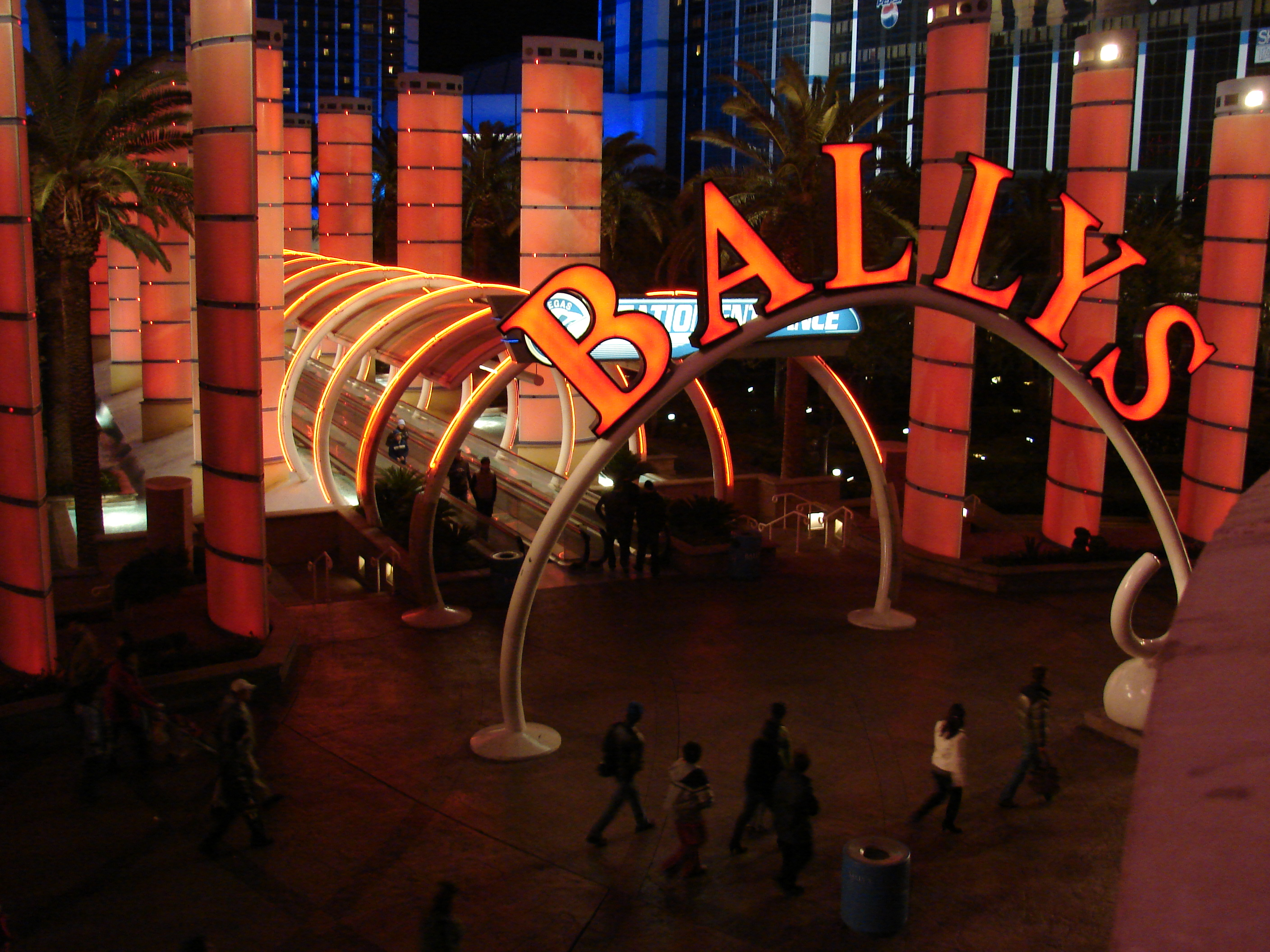
Moving-walkway entrance

In late 1985, Bally Manufacturing announced plans to purchase the Las Vegas MGM and its Reno counterpart. The sale of the two hotels was finalized in April 1986, for $550 million, and they were renamed under the Bally's brand. The deal required the removal of logos throughout the resorts that depicted MGM's mascot, Leo the Lion. The jai alai court closed in the 1980s.

In July 1986, a man secretly placed a pipe bomb in the resort's sportsbook and later demanded $200,000 from the casino, threatening to detonate the bomb if he did not receive the money. The bomb was found by authorities and detonated by them outside of the resort, exploding only with the intensity of a firecracker. The man was found and arrested. In 1991, a small fire occurred on one side of the Bally's sign, which was located along the Las Vegas Strip. Workers were changing the sign's lights at the time of the fire, which caused $250,000 in damage.

In 1993, Bally's announced plans to create a new entrance along the Las Vegas Strip, on a three-acre property that was being used as a resort parking lot. The entrance would include moving walkways and was expected to be complete by the end of 1994. The new entrance was designed by Brad Friedmutter. Moving walkways were added because of the distance between the resort's entrance and the sidewalk along the Strip. Also announced were plans for a monorail, which opened in June 1995. It ran from Bally's to a new MGM Grand resort, located further south on the Strip. The resort's shopping mall was renovated in 1995. The mall, known as Bally's Avenue Shoppes, included approximately 20 retailers. The former movie theater was converted into a new sportsbook, which was opened later in 1995, at a cost of $4 million. Bally Entertainment was purchased in 1996 by Hilton Hotels Corporation.

The world premiere of Star Trek: Insurrection was held in the resort's Jubilee Theater on December 10, 1998. That year, Hilton's casino resorts division was spun off into Park Place Entertainment. A Bally's sister property, Paris Las Vegas, opened in September 1999. Paris was tightly integrated with the Bally's property by a promenade. For many years, the two resorts operated under a single gaming license. Many of Bally's high-end customers began going to the Paris upon its opening. Bally's exterior received new paint, including the addition of blue stripes, to make it more presentable for the opening of Paris.

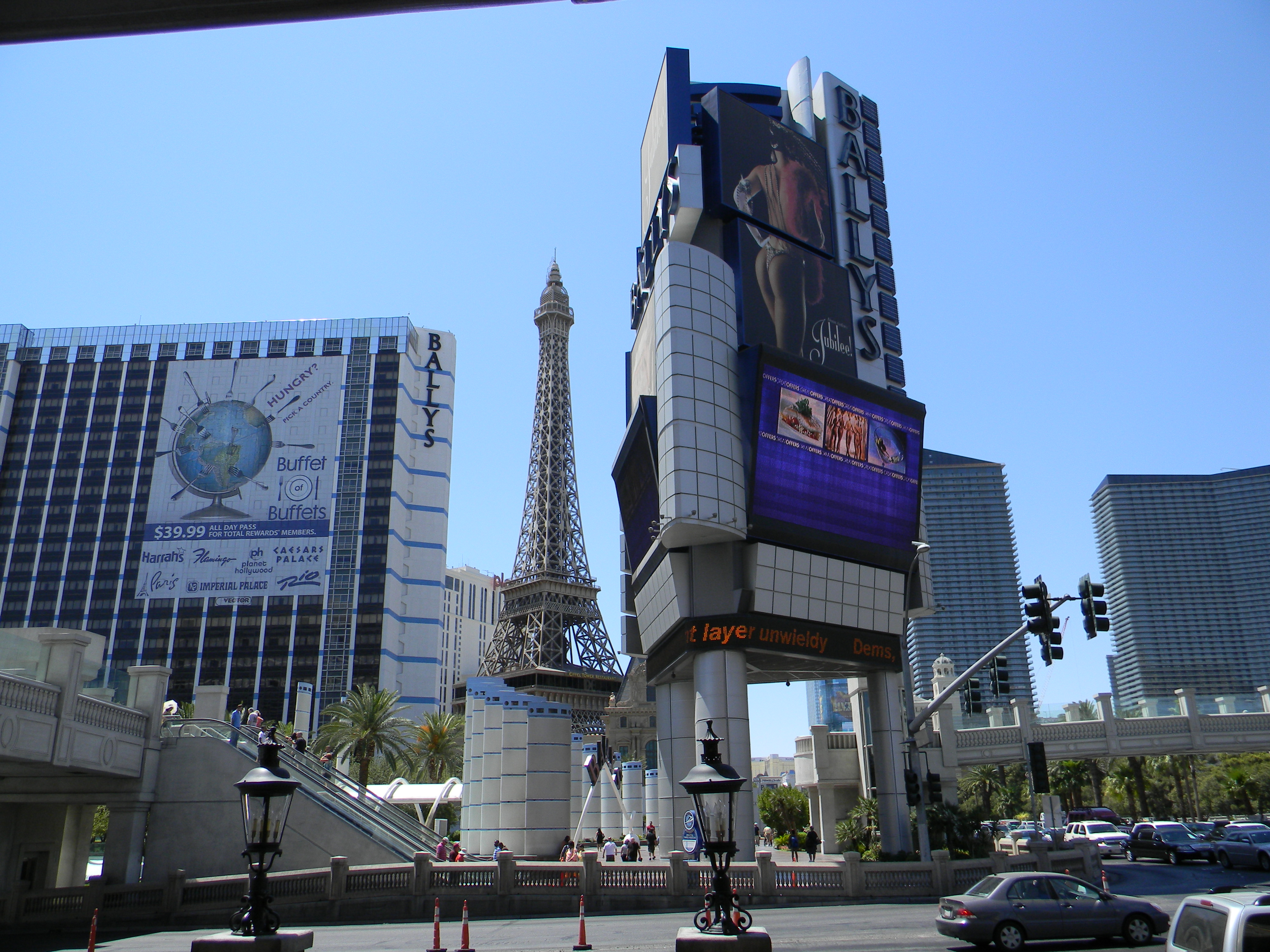
Newer Bally's sign, seen in 2010

Park Place began a renovation of Bally's in 2000, including a modernization of the hotel rooms, casino floor, convention space, and restaurants. The resort's original sign, from 1973, was replaced with a new version in 2001, marking the conclusion of the renovation project. The sign is 150 feet high and cost $10 million, making it the most expensive sign on the Strip at the time of its installation. The sign is three-sided, each featuring a large Mitsubishi Diamond screen. In addition to advertising the resort, Park Place also rented the sign out to other advertisers. The MGM-Bally's monorail ended operations in 2003, to become part of the larger Las Vegas Monorail. That year, Park Place was renamed as Caesars Entertainment, Inc.

Harrah's Entertainment acquired the resort with its purchase of Caesars in June 2005. Harrah's considered numerous options for the Bally's property, including the possibility of renovating or renaming it. Another option was to demolish it to build a Horseshoe-branded hotel; the company had acquired the Horseshoe name in 2004, after purchasing the Binion's Horseshoe casino in downtown Las Vegas. A Bally's executive said that the moving-walkway entrance would eventually be redeveloped, saying "they have to do something because the land is just too valuable to sit there." The sportsbook was closed in 2009, and reopened later that year following renovations.

In 2010, Harrah's became Caesars Entertainment Corporation. In 2013, remodeling took place on the 756-room south tower, which was renamed as the Jubilee Tower in honor of the resort's long-running show Jubilee! The casino floor was also remodeled, and new restaurants were added. The Bally's Steakhouse, a well-known eatery, was closed to make way for a larger restaurant called BLT Steak. The popular Sterling Brunch buffet operates in a portion of the steakhouse during weekends.

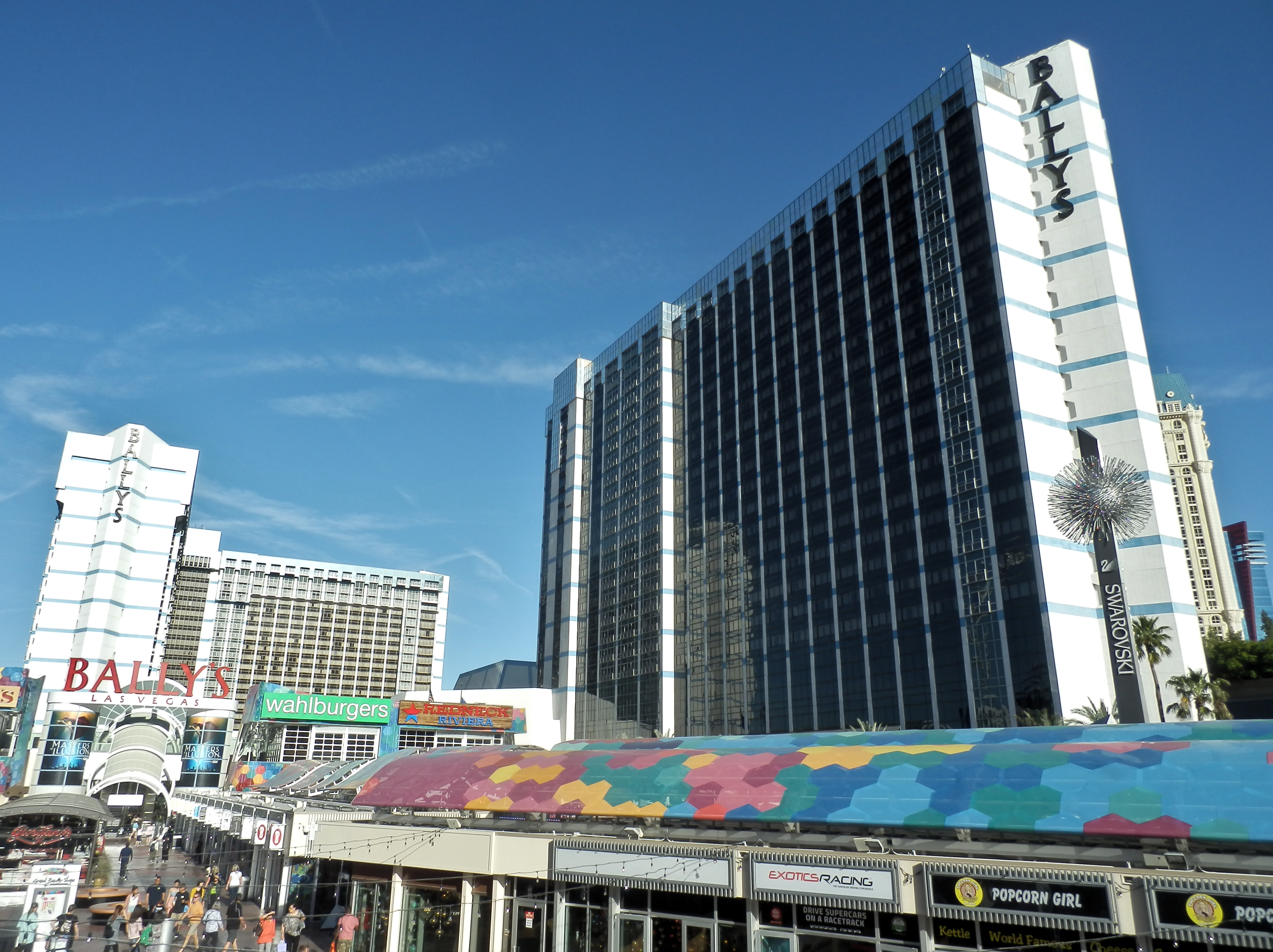
Grand Bazaar Shops and the Jubilee Tower (right) in 2018

At the end of 2013, construction began on a new Bally's shopping mall called Grand Bazaar, based on the market of the same name in Istanbul. The outdoor mall was built on two acres of land along the Las Vegas Strip, replacing the moving-walkway entrance. Caesars leased the property to a retail developer and was also a partner in the new project. The mall was part of the ongoing renovations to the resort. The Grand Bazaar Shops were initially scheduled to open in December 2014, although construction delays pushed the opening back to February 26, 2015. It opened with 70 of its 110 retailers; the remainder would open gradually over the next several months.

For several years, the Grand Bazaar Shops included a Starbucks with bleacher seating and a large movie screen, the only location to have such features. At 4,000 sq ft (370 m^{2}), it was the third largest Starbucks in the U.S. Bars and restaurants were added to the mall in 2016, to increase customer attendance. The mall includes restaurants Wahlburgers and Giordano's.

In May 2018, Caesars completed a $125 million redesign of 2,052 guest rooms and suites in the original northern tower, which was renamed as the Resort Tower. It had previously operated as the Indigo Tower. Bally's includes the biggest tennis court on the Las Vegas Strip.

=== Horseshoe Las Vegas (2022–present) ===
On January 26, 2022, Caesars announced that the property would be rebranded Horseshoe Las Vegas as part of a multi-million dollar renovation project, including exterior renovations, new restaurants, and a revamp of the casino floor. Bally's remained open during the renovation work, which excluded the hotel rooms.

Horseshoe Las Vegas is named after the original Binion's Horseshoe, which was renamed Binion's Gambling Hall in 2005. The rebranding of Bally's took effect on December 15, 2022, with the exterior still undergoing final changes. A ceremony was held on March 24, 2023, marking completion of the rebranding.

The renovation work included new wallpaper, paint, and carpeting. The casino floor received a spacious new layout, and the poker room was updated to include 4 new tables for a total of 18. The sportsbook was relocated to the main casino floor, and the original location was converted into a video game arcade with more than 80 games. A glass case of $10,000 bills, previously displayed for decades at Binion's Horseshoe, was restored at the new Horseshoe. Several new restaurants were added as well, including Jack Binion's Steak. It replaced BLT Steak, which closed during the COVID-19 pandemic in Nevada and never reopened. Chef Guy Fieri opened Flavortown Sports Kitchen, and chef Martin Yan briefly operated an Asian restaurant, M.Y. Asia, during 2023. It was his first Las Vegas restaurant but closed after five months.

In 2022, Bally's and Paris became the first Strip properties to host the World Series of Poker, an annual event which debuted at Binion's Horseshoe in 1970. The event returned to Paris and the rebranded Horseshoe in 2023.

In 2023, Caesars announced plans to renovate the Jubilee Tower (to be renamed the Versailles Tower) and incorporate it into Paris Las Vegas, thus reducing the room count at Horseshoe to 2,056.

In February 2026, the Laugh Factory opened a 250-seat comedy club at the Horseshoe, replacing the Imagine Showroom. The club marked its opening with performances by comedians Concrete and Jamie Kennedy, while Jimmie Walker participated in the opening ceremony.

== Entertainment ==
=== Performers and shows ===
When it opened in 1973, the MGM Grand Hotel featured two large theatres: the Ziegfeld Room, with a capacity of 800 people; and the Celebrity Room, with capacity for 1,200. The Ziegfeld featured productions by famed Las Vegas choreographer Donn Arden, including Hallelujah Hollywood, which ran until 1980. The resort also hosted Arden's long-running theatrical show Jubilee! It premiered at the resort in 1981 and eventually closed in 2016, making it one of the longest-running shows in Las Vegas history. A motorcycle stunt show by Nitro Circus was to replace Jubilee!, although it was put on hold and ultimately never opened.

Dean Martin was the first entertainer to perform at the Grand, with Sergio Franchi as the first entertainer signed to star in the Celebrity Room (three-year contract starting February 1974). Franchi's frequent co-star was comedian Joan Rivers. The Celebrity Room also hosted such acts as the Carpenters and Barry Manilow. Other notable performers at the resort have included Lou Rawls, Sam Kinison, Andrew Dice Clay, Bob Dylan, Liza Minnelli, Taylor Hicks, and Dionne Warwick. Penn & Teller made their Las Vegas Strip debut at the Celebrity Room in 1993.

The Celebrity Room was eventually demolished to connect Bally's with Paris. In 2003, there were plans to build a seven-story theater on an acre of land at Bally's east side. The theater was to host a new show starring Esther Williams, although both projects were scrapped. The Price Is Right Live! debuted at Bally's Jubilee Theater in April 2006. It was a scaled-down version of the television program.

During 2012, The Amazing Johnathan hosted a magic show in a space formerly used for the resort's buffet, which had closed several years earlier. Tony n' Tina's Wedding also premiered in the former buffet space in 2012, followed by another show, Divorce Party the Musical. The buffet space was renamed as the Windows Showroom. Tony n' Tina's Wedding ended in 2016, but returned two years later at the resort's Buca di Beppo restaurant. From 2016 to 2018, Wayne Newton hosted a show in the Windows Showroom called Wayne Newton: Up Close and Personal. It included singing and sharing stories with the audience.

An audience participation game show, titled Miss Behave, debuted at Bally's in 2017, and ended three years later. Masters of Illusion, a magic show based on the television series of the same name, began its run at the Jubilee Theater in 2017. In 2019, the Windows Showroom debuted a show by magician Xavier Mortimer, and a Harry Potter parody show titled Potted Potter.

The variety show Extravaganza debuted in the Jubilee Theater in March 2020, but was closed after one show, due to the COVID-19 pandemic. It reopened later in the year, and performed its 100th show in February 2021. Extravaganza closed in January 2023. Later that year, burlesque dancer Dita Von Teese opened Dita Las Vegas, featuring showgirls. It takes place in the Jubilee Theater and includes costumes and sets from Jubilee!.

In April 2026, impressionist Rich Little began a residency at the Laugh Factory club at the Horseshoe, performing three nights a week.

=== Attractions ===
A nightclub by Victor Drai, called Drais After Hours, opened at Bally's in May 2013. It had previously operated across the street at Bill's Gambling Hall and Saloon, which was now undergoing renovations, prompting the temporary relocation of Drais. In June 2014, Victor Drai turned the Bally's location into Liaison, a club catering to a gay clientele. It closed in February 2015, because of low attendance.

In 2016, singer John Rich opened a country music club at the Grand Bazaar Shops called Redneck Riviera, which eventually closed in 2018. In 2024, singer Blake Shelton opened Ole Red, a four-story country themed restaurant, bar and entertainment venue. It operates in a new building at the Grand Bazaar Shops.

A 10,000 sq ft (930 m^{2}) miniature golf course, themed after The Twilight Zone, was opened at the end of 2017. The course was created by Monster Mini Golf, and it also includes an arcade and bowling. A horror-themed escape room opened in 2018. The resort is also home to the Real Bodies exhibit, which showcases real specimens of the human body as well as different organs.

== Media history ==
Shortly after the 1973 opening, MGM had planned to shoot two television pilots at the resort. In 1981, a remake of Grand Hotel (1932) was being prepared, with filming to take place at the MGM Grand. However, the project was shelved after MGM film executives realized that director Norman Jewison would have final cut privilege. The executives were concerned about the MGM Grand being portrayed in a negative way. The remake of Grand Hotel was never made. Several films and television series were later shot at the resort, and it would appear in other media as well.

- The MGM Grand hosted The Dean Martin Celebrity Roast in the Ziegfeld Room from 1974 to 1984.
- The MGM was also used as a filming location for the 1982 film Lookin' to Get Out.
- Featured in the 1985 MGM film Rocky IV, as the site of Apollo Creed's fatal exhibition bout against Ivan Drago. The theater, and set pieces, for Jubilee! are prominently displayed during the scene.
- Featured in the 1985 film Fever Pitch, evidently when the sale of the casino was pending.
- Hosted Late Night with David Letterman for a week in May 1987.
- Side 1 of Sam Kinison's 1990 comedy album Leader of The Banned was recorded at Bally's.
- Featured in the 1991 comedy Hot Shots!, when the pilot nicknamed "Wash Out" mistakes a runway and lands near the hotel (which features Tom Jones at the time).
- Featured prominently in the 1992 film Honeymoon in Vegas, starring Nicolas Cage and Sarah Jessica Parker.
- Featured in the 1995 film Leaving Las Vegas, also starring Cage and Elisabeth Shue.
- Featured in the 2004 video game Grand Theft Auto: San Andreas as the "High Roller".
- Bally's Las Vegas hosted Spike TV's 2006 poker tournament series King of Vegas, which filmed in a temporary studio constructed in a parking lot behind the resort.
- Featured in the 2013 film The Incredible Burt Wonderstone, starring Steve Carell and Steve Buscemi.
- Bally's Las Vegas hosted the second season of the 2015 syndicated game show Monopoly Millionaires' Club.
- Was mentioned in 2001 version of Ocean's Eleven as the scene of a casino robbery (the bronze medalist).
- A head chef position at BLT Steak, located inside the hotel, was awarded to Ariel Malone, the winner of Hell's Kitchen's 15th season.
- The Jubilee Theater was the filming location for the American version of Who Wants to Be a Millionaire? from 2016 until it ended in 2019.
- The casino's event center held Game Changer Wrestling's Collective series of events from April 15-18, 2026 during WrestleMania 42 weekend alongside WrestleCon which featured shows from Game Changer Wrestling (GCW), Hybrid Wrestling, Pro Wrestling Unplugged (PWU), PODER~!, Dragon Gate/Dragon Gate USA, New Japan Pro-Wrestling (NJPW), and Juggalo Championship Wrestling (JCW).

== See also ==
- List of integrated resorts
