= Jubilee! =

Former Las Vegas Strip spectacular revue

- Genre: Revue
- Show type: Resident show
- Date of premiere: July 31, 1981
- Final show: February 11, 2016
- Location: originally at the MGM Grand Hotel and Casino, which later became Horseshoe Las Vegas

Creative team
- Producer: Donn Arden
- Costume designer: Bob Mackie
- Costume designer: Pete Menefee
- Lighting designer: Ken Billington
- Official website

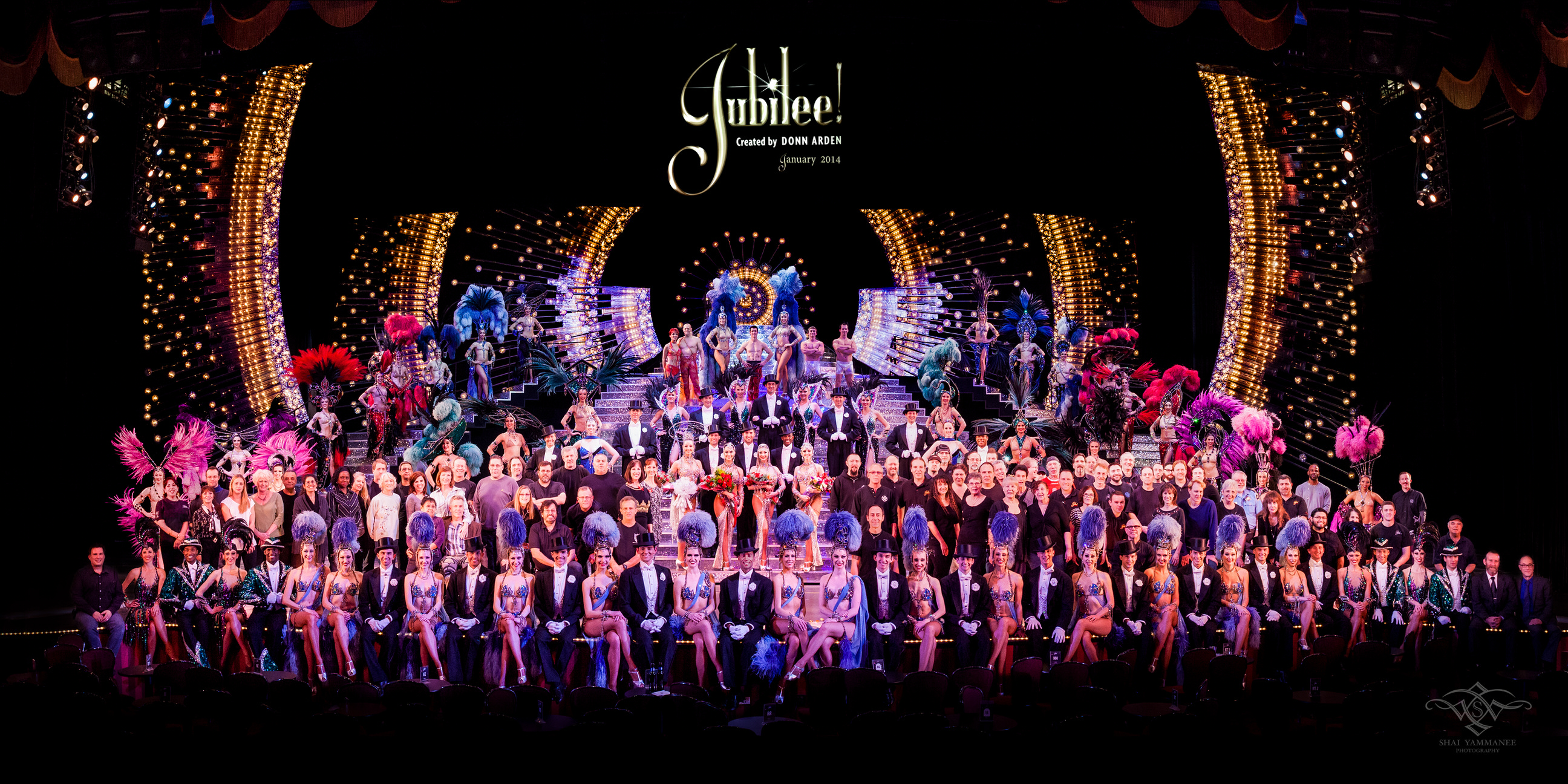
Jubilee! - Full Cast and Crew photo - 2014

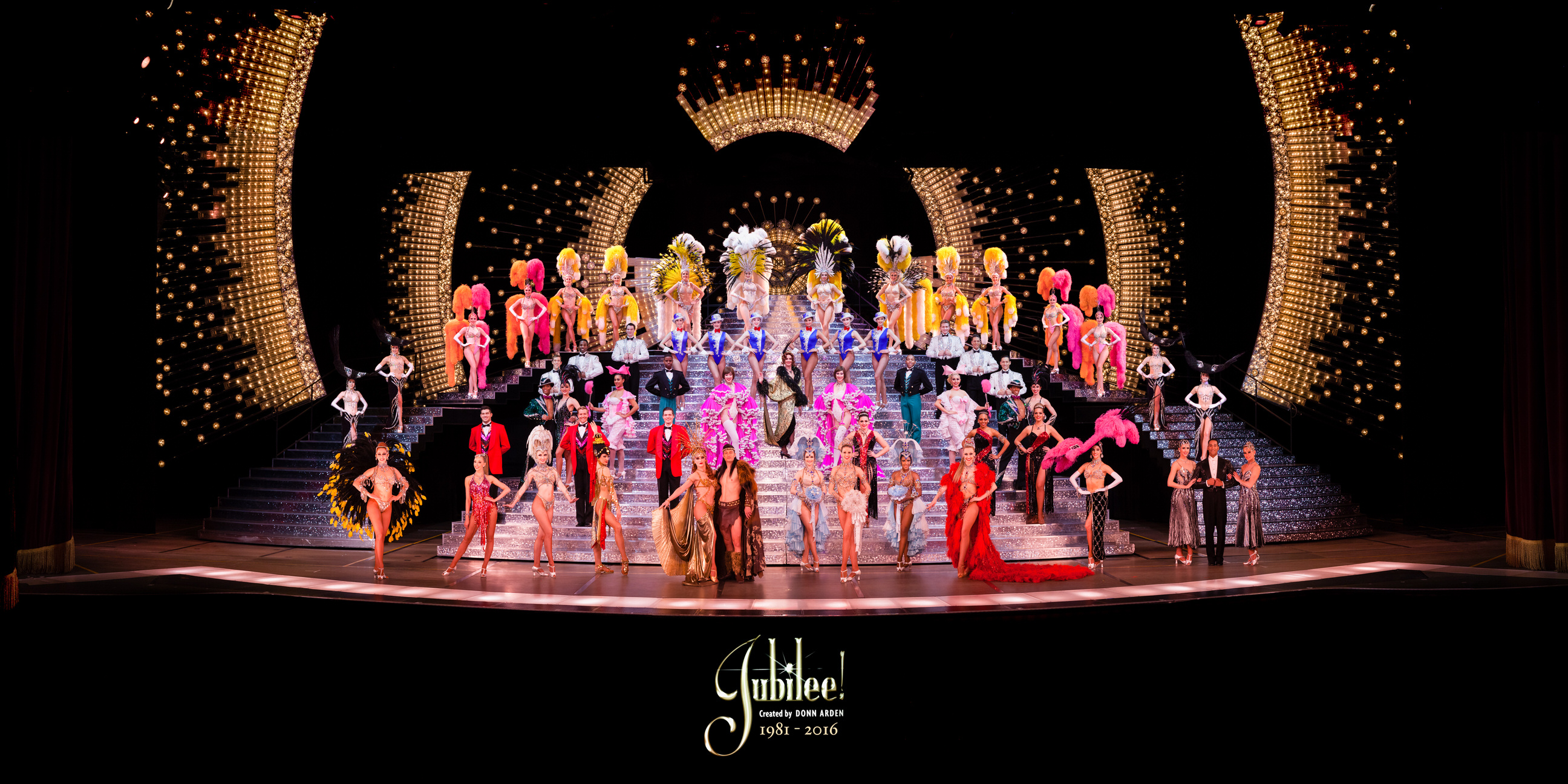
Jubilee! Cast Photo (Final Cast) 2016 - Costume Showcase

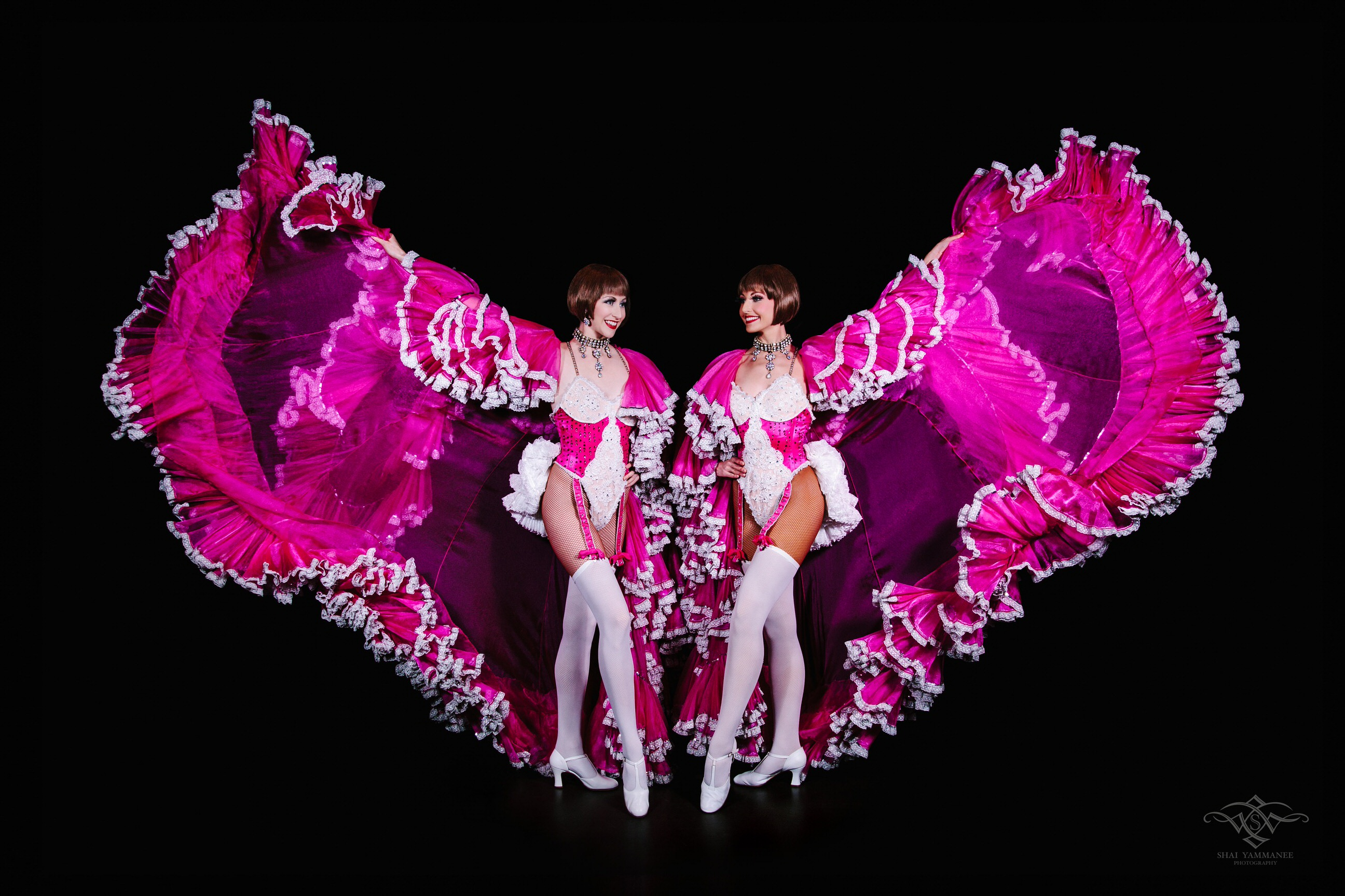
The Dollys from the Follies

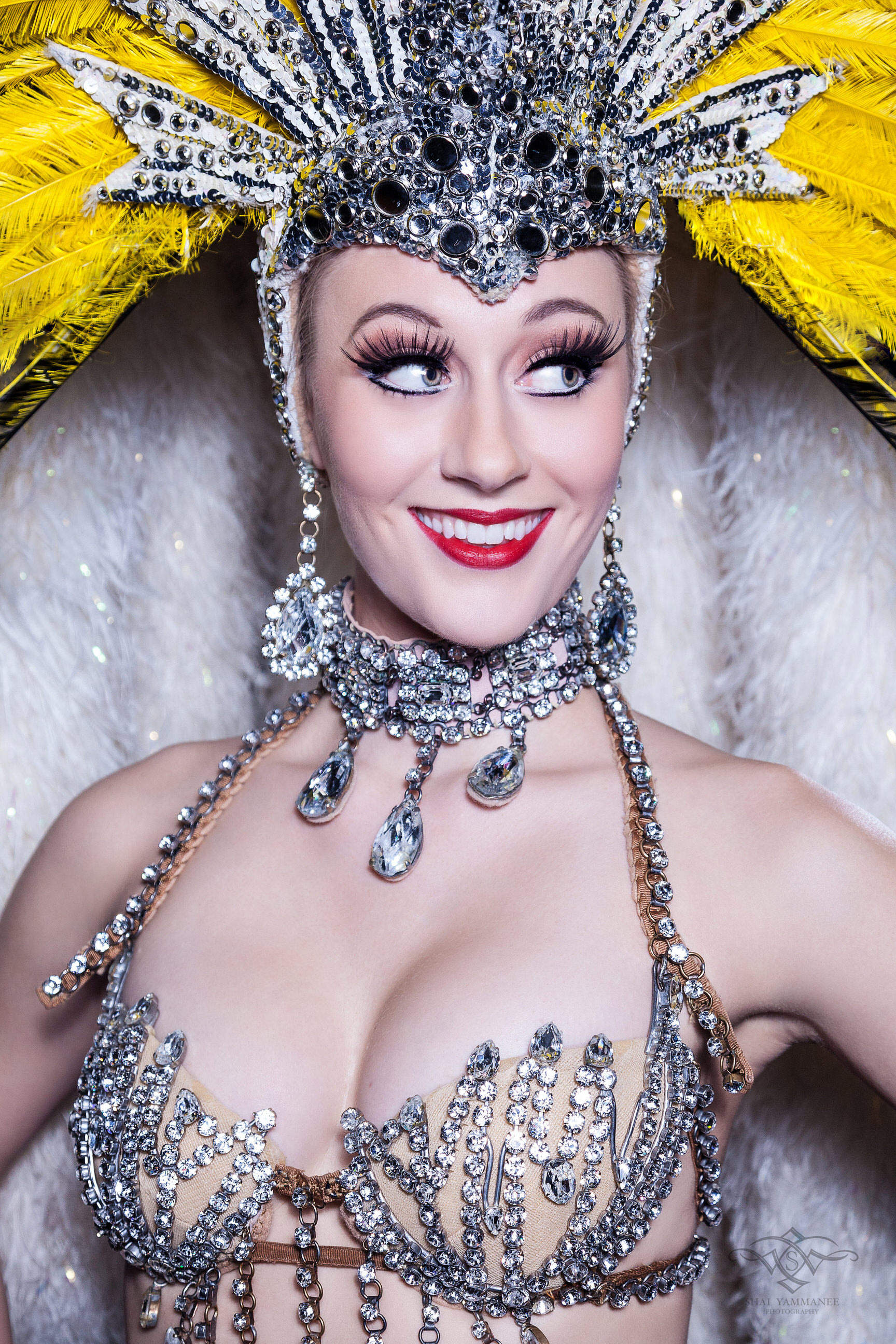
Disco Section Costume - Close Up

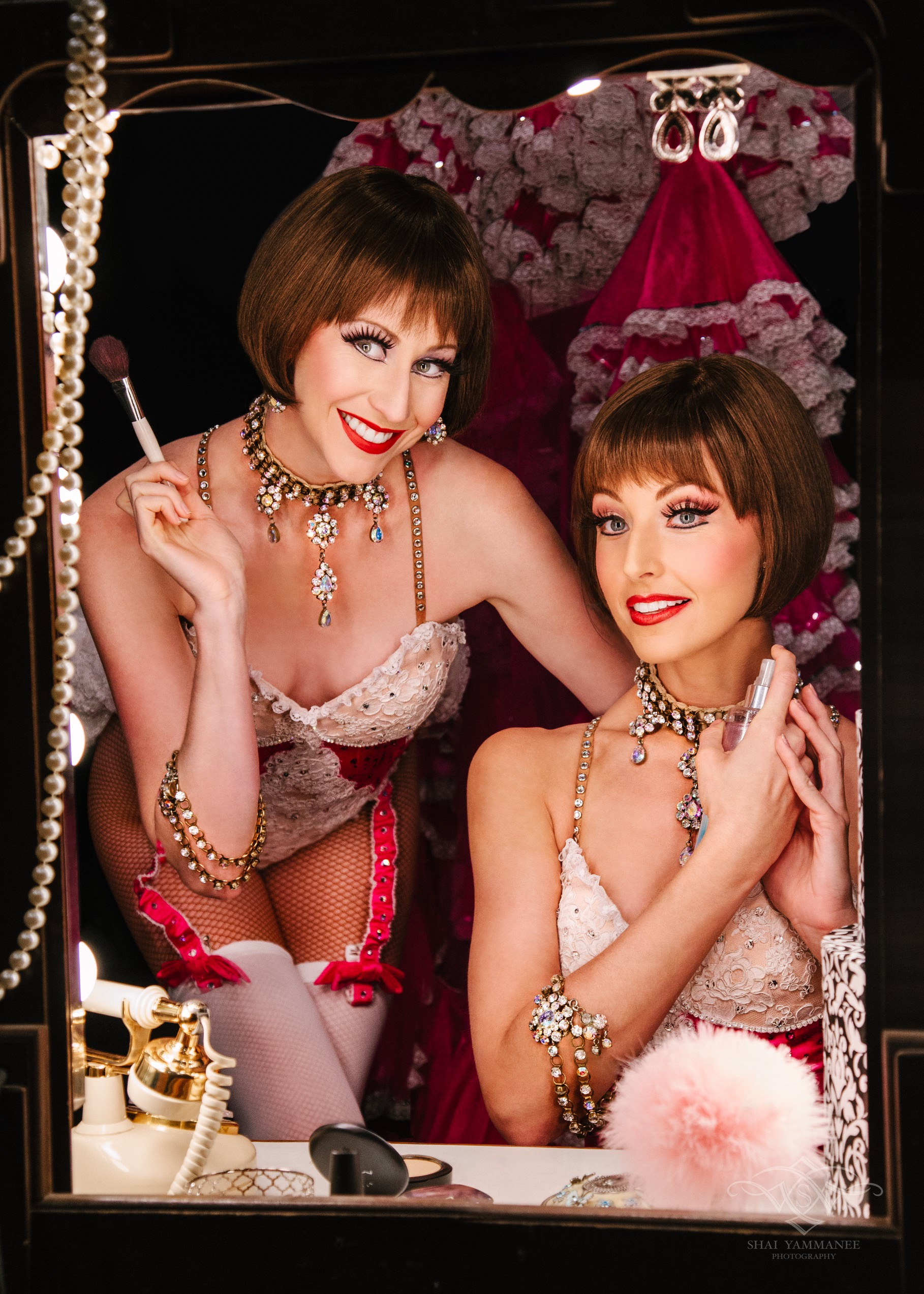
Dolly Sisters getting ready

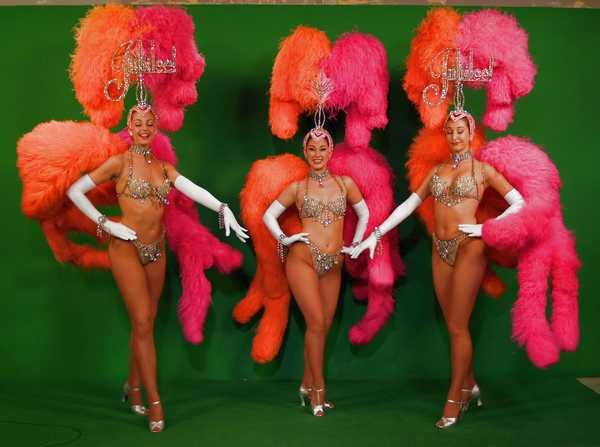
Jubilee! showgirls

Jubilee! was a Las Vegas Strip-based spectacular revue. It opened on July 31, 1981, at an initial cost of 10 million dollars and was originally produced by Donn Arden. The show ended its 35-year run on February 11, 2016.

Model Tiffany Coyne once danced in the show.

== Reception ==
When it closed in 2016, this resident show at Bally's Las Vegas was the longest-running production show in Las Vegas. The Jubilee! showgirls were an icon of old Vegas. The show used costumes designed by Bob Mackie and Pete Menefee. There were 36 individual designs, each based on the jewel tones of amethyst, sapphire, emerald, and ruby. UNLV Special Collections houses many of the original costume design drawings which can be accessed online through the Showgirls collection from UNLV Digital Collections.

Many of the show's sets dated back to the original production. Jubilee!'s longest serving principal dancer from the opening night until her departure 23 years later was Linda Green. The final closing cast consisted of 3 female singers, 3 male singers, 18 male dancers, 23 topless dancers, and 19 female dancers. Within the female covered and topless dancers, they were further categorized as "short" and "tall" dancers. A "short" dancer is a female dancer between 5 ft 8 in (173 cm) and 5 ft 9 in (175 cm) and a "tall" female dancer is between 5 ft 10 in (178 cm) and 6 ft 2 in (188 cm). One may have been surprised at how tall the dancers were because of the proportions of the stage, which was three and a half stories high, giving the illusion that the performers are smaller in relationship to the stage.

Lighting designed by Ken Billington.

== Acts ==
- Act 1 Showtime! Putting It into the Right Vernacular
- Act 2 A Specialty Act that varied over the years, toward the end was a hand balancing act
- Act 3 Samson and Delilah Tonight, a Lesson from Ancient History
- Act 4 Another Specialty Act that varied over the years, sometimes a magic act, towards the end was a gaucho act
- Act 5 Titanic Away We Go on the Mighty "Unsinkable" Ocean Liner
- Act 6 Another Specialty Act, towards the end was an aerial act
- Act 7 The Finale A Tribute to Fred Astaire and Ginger Rogers

== Legacy ==
Screenwriter Kate Gersten visited the Jubilee! show before it concluded and was inspired to write a play about the dancers in a similar Las Vegas show's closing. That unproduced play became the basis for the screenplay she wrote for the 2024 American drama film The Last Showgirl, directed by Gia Coppola and starring Pamela Anderson as a Vegas showgirl near the end of her career at the closing of a long-running show. The American singer-songwriter Taylor Swift donned the rhinestone-encrusted bra and thong set worn by one of the Jubilee! showgirls, complete with hip swags, a headpiece and feathered armbands, for one of the cover artworks of her twelfth studio album, The Life of a Showgirl (2025).

== See also ==
- Peepshow
- Sirens of TI
- Absinthe
- Moulin Rouge
- Le Lido
- Folies Bergère
- Casino de Paris
- Paradis Latin
- Cabaret Red Light
- Tropicana Club
- Crazy Horse (cabaret)
