= Axis of Eve =

Women's political advocacy group

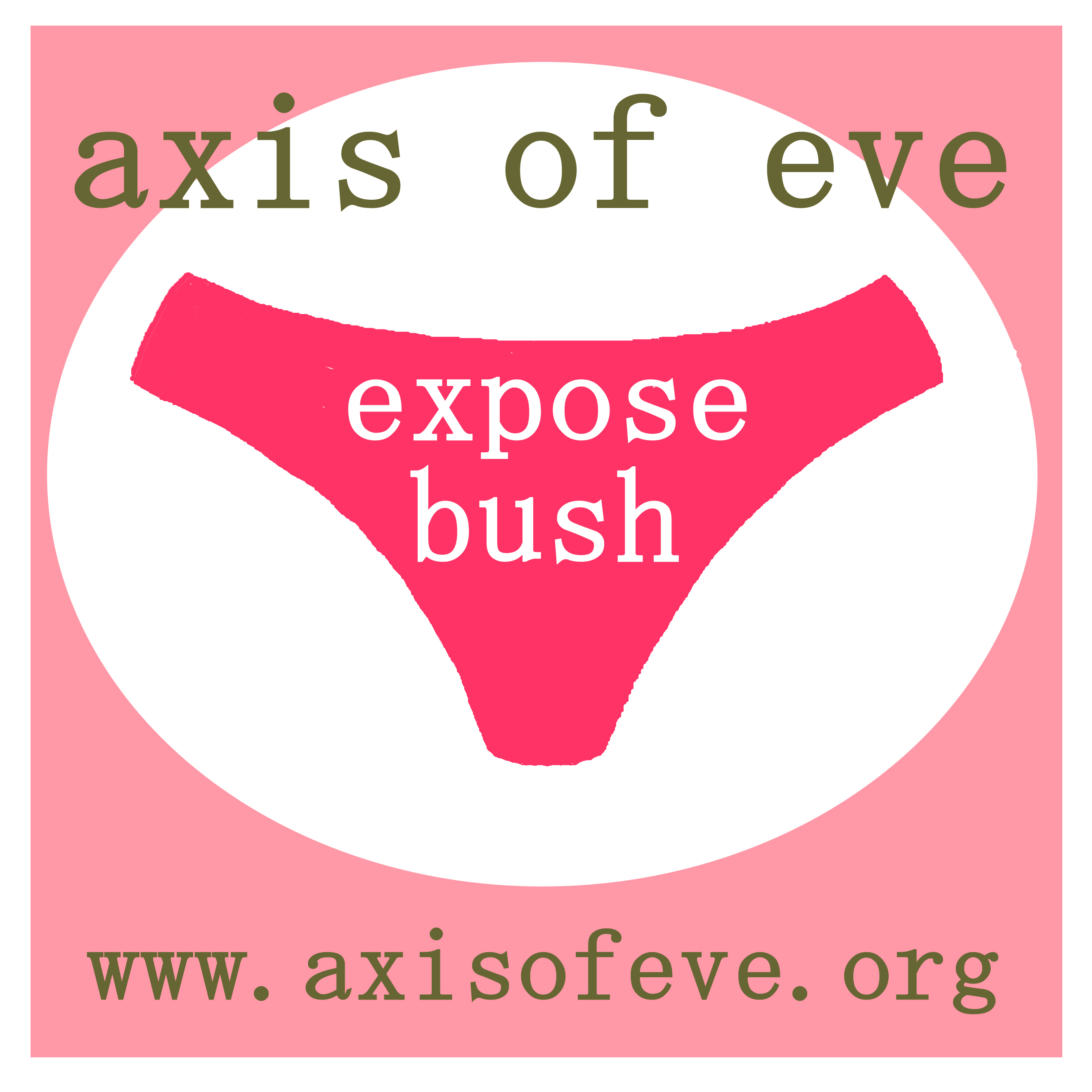

Axis of Eve was a women's political advocacy group and non-profit business based in the United States and active in the 2004 election run-up. Its name was a play on words satirizing US President George W. Bush's "Axis of Evil" epithet for Iran, Iraq and North Korea. They described themselves as "a coalition of brazen women on a mission to EXPOSE and DEPOSE President Select George W. Bush."

The group produced a line of "protest panties" including women's underwear (made by American Apparel), tank tops, and men's boxers. The slogans on the underwear were based on the risqué double entendre possibilities offered by president Bush's name (e.g. "Give Bush the Finger") and by some of his most infamous phrases (e.g. "Weapon of Mass Seduction", referencing his frequent references to "weapons of mass destruction"). A line of men's boxers featured humorous double entendres based on vice president Dick Cheney's name (e.g. "Yank Cheney" and "Lick Dick").

Axis of Eve followers across the country, encouraged to call themselves "Eves," often purchased protest wear in bulk and coordinated "pantyware parties" or group trips to political marches and events, such as the March for Women's Lives. During the Republican Convention in New York City, the group organized a "mass flash" demonstration in which over 200 women assembled and showed off their political panties. According to their website (no longer active): "Axis of Eve reclaims women's bodies as instruments for positive politics and regime change. The mass flash is a demand for transparency and accountability. We bare our protest panties to boldly call for an end to political cover-ups."

Axis of Eve apparel achieved international public recognition as a part of the trend in political clothing, frequently appearing alongside other politically based products in major publications such as Vogue, Ms. Magazine, Time magazine, The New York Times; San Francisco Chronicle, BUST Magazine, The New York Observer; Time Out; Village Voice; The Nation; New York Newsday; New York Metro, Miami Herald; The Wall Street Journal; German Cosmopolitan; Der Spiegel; French Maxim; Canada Gazette; and Readymade magazine (see selected media links are below). They also appeared on various television outlets including CNN, MSNBC, and HBO Fashion, and NBC (Triumph the Dog on Late Night with Conan O'Brien).

As part of the drive to turn out the vote among American youth, Axis of Eve frequently organized events with groups like Indie Voter, Youth Voter Alliance, and Rock the Vote, as well as fellow satirists Billionaires for Bush and Code Pink. Celebrities such as Moby, Susan Sarandon, and Outkast's Andre 3000, and Jesse Jackson supported the panties. On election day 2004, members of the group allied themselves with Annie A-Bomb and Melissa Bang-Bang, burlesque performers who are now part of the Cabaret Red Light, for an effort to increase voter turn out in Pennsylvania, considered a "swing" state that year.

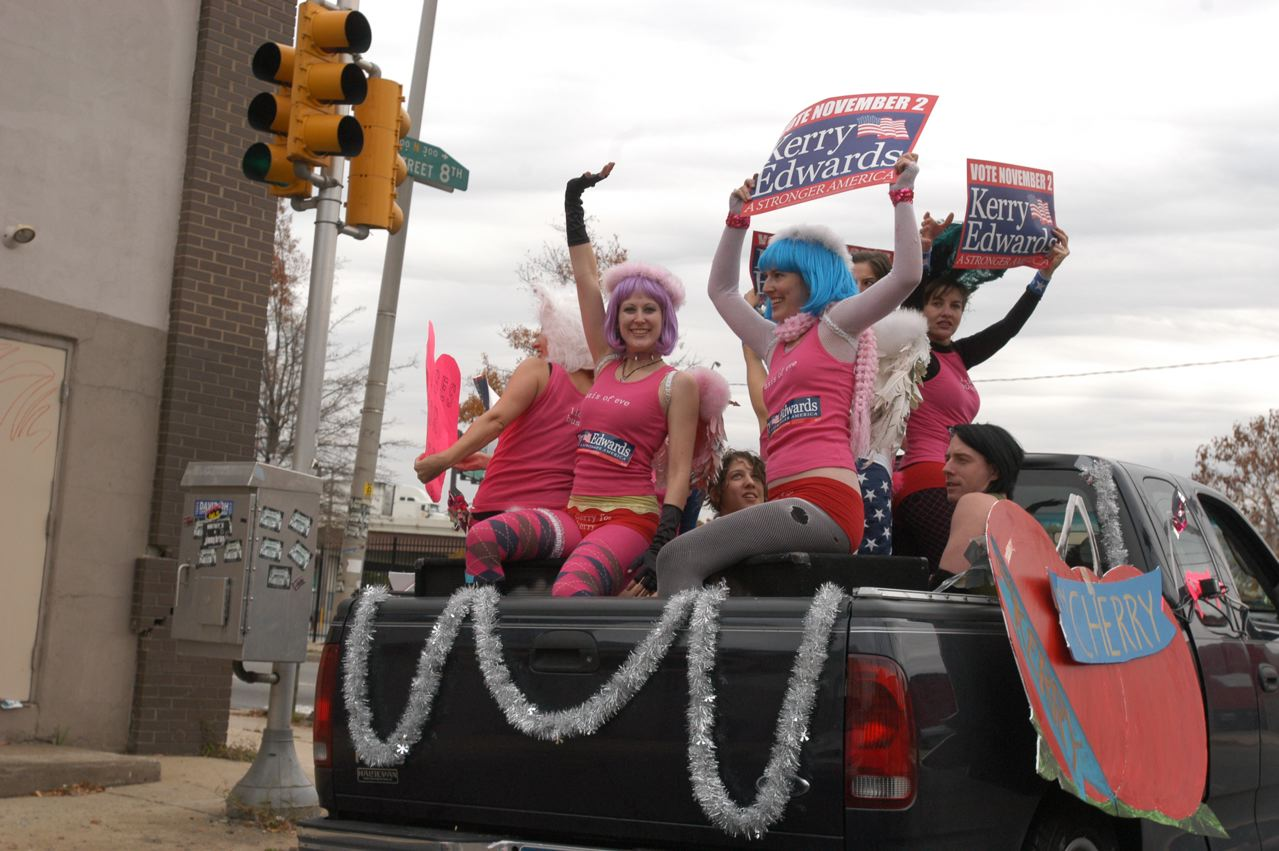
