= A-bomb (disambiguation) =

An A-bomb (short for atomic bomb) is a nuclear weapon.

A-bomb may also refer to:

- A-Bomb, the debut EP of Teenage Bottlerocket
- Anna Frangiosa, American artist and performer also known as Annie A-Bomb
- Rick Jones (character), a Marvel Comics character also known as A-Bomb

== See also ==
- Atom bomb (disambiguation)
