= Axis of evil =

American term for "sponsors of terrorism"

Bush's "axis of evil" included Iran, Iraq, and North Korea "Beyond the Axis of Evil" included Cuba, Libya, and Syria The United States

The phrase "axis of evil" was first used by U.S. president George W. Bush and originally referred to Iran, Ba'athist Iraq, and North Korea. It was used in Bush's State of the Union address on January 29, 2002, four months after the September 11 attacks and more than a year before the 2003 invasion of Iraq, and often repeated throughout his presidency. He used it to describe foreign governments that, during his administration, allegedly sponsored terrorism and sought weapons of mass destruction.

The countries originally covered by the term were Iran, Ba'athist Iraq, and North Korea. In response, Iran formed a political alliance that it called the "Axis of Resistance" comprising Iran, Ba'athist Syria, Hezbollah and the Gaza Strip under Hamas.

Lately, an updated grouping consisting of China, Russia, Iran and North Korea, also known as CRINK, has been referred to as the "new axis of evil" by U.S. politicians and commentators. The term "axis of evil" is a reference to the Axis powers of World War II (Nazi Germany, Fascist Italy, and the Empire of Japan).

== Origins ==
=== David Frum ===
The phrase was attributed to former Bush pro-Israel White House speechwriter David Frum, originally as the axis of hatred and then evil. Information about his authorship first came out when emails of Frum's wife to friends were picked up by the media. Frum explained his rationale for creating the phrase axis of evil in his 2003 book The Right Man: The Surprise Presidency of George W. Bush. According to Frum, in late December 2001 head speechwriter Michael Gerson gave him the assignment of articulating the case for dislodging the regime of Saddam Hussein in Iraq in only a few sentences for the upcoming State of the Union address. Frum says he began by rereading US President Franklin D. Roosevelt's "date which will live in infamy" speech given on December 8, 1941, after the Japanese surprise attack on Pearl Harbor. While Americans needed no convincing about going to war with Japan, Roosevelt saw the greater threat to the United States coming from Nazi Germany, and he had to make the case for fighting a two-ocean war.

In his book, Frum points to an often-overlooked sentence in Roosevelt's speech which partially reads, "...we will not only defend ourselves to the uttermost but we will make very certain that this form of treachery shall never endanger us again." Frum interprets Roosevelt's oratory like this: "For FDR, Pearl Harbor was not only an attack—it was a warning of future and worse attacks from another, even more dangerous enemy." Japan, a country with one-tenth of America's industrial capacity, a dependence on imports for its food, and already engaged in a war with China, was extremely reckless to attack the United States, a recklessness "that made the Axis such a menace to world peace", Frum says. Saddam Hussein's two wars, against Iran and Kuwait, were just as reckless, Frum decided, and therefore, they posed the same threat to world peace.

In his book, Frum wrote that the more he compared the Axis powers of World War II to modern "terror states", the more similarities he saw between them. "The Axis powers disliked and distrusted one another", Frum writes. "Had the Axis somehow won the war, its members would quickly have turned on one another." Iran, Iraq, al-Qaeda, and Hezbollah, despite quarreling among themselves, "all resented the power of the West and Israel, and all of them despised the humane values of democracy." There, Frum saw the connection: "Together, the terror states and the terror organizations formed an axis of hatred against the United States."

Frum wrote that he then sent off a memo with the above arguments and he also cited some of the atrocities perpetrated by the Iraqi government. He expected his words to be chopped apart and altered beyond recognition, as is the fate of much presidential speechwriting, but his words were ultimately read by Bush nearly verbatim, though Bush changed the term axis of hatred to axis of evil. North Korea was added to the list, he says, because it was attempting to develop nuclear weapons, had a history of reckless aggression, and "needed to feel a stronger hand".

=== Yossef Bodansky ===
A decade before the 2002 State of the Union address, in August 1992, the Israeli-American political scientist Yossef Bodansky wrote a paper entitled "Tehran, Baghdad & Damascus: The New Axis Pact" while serving as the Director of the Congressional Task Force on Terrorism and Unconventional Warfare of the US House of Representatives. Although he did not explicitly apply the epithet evil to his New Axis, Bodansky's axis was otherwise very reminiscent of Frum's axis. Bodansky felt that this new Axis was a very dangerous development. The gist of Bodansky's argument was that Iran, Iraq and Syria had formed a "tripartite alliance" in the wake of the First Gulf War, and that this alliance posed an imminent threat that could only be dealt with by invading Iraq a second time and overthrowing Saddam Hussein.

== 2002 State of the Union Address ==
In his 2002 State of the Union Address, Bush called North Korea "A regime arming with missiles and weapons of mass destruction, while starving its citizens." He also stated Iran "aggressively pursues these weapons and exports terror, while an unelected few repress the Iranian people's hope for freedom." Bush gave the most criticism to Iraq, stating "Iraq continues to flaunt its hostility toward America and to support terror. The Iraqi regime has plotted to develop anthrax and nerve gas and nuclear weapons for over a decade. This is a regime that has already used poison gas to murder thousands of its own citizens, leaving the bodies of mothers huddled over their dead children. This is a regime that agreed to international inspections, then kicked out the inspectors. This is a regime that has something to hide from the civilized world." Afterwards, Bush said, "States like these and their terrorist allies constitute an axis of evil, arming to threaten the peace of the world."

== Bolton: "Beyond the Axis of Evil" ==
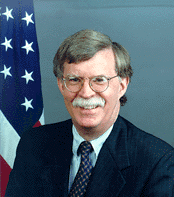
John Bolton

On May 6, 2002, then-Undersecretary of State John Bolton gave a speech entitled "Beyond the Axis of Evil". In it he added three more nations to be grouped with the already mentioned rogue states: Cuba, Libya, and Syria. The criteria for inclusion in this grouping were: "state sponsors of terrorism that are pursuing or who have the potential to pursue weapons of mass destruction (WMD) or have the capability to do so in violation of their treaty obligations."

== China, Russia, Iran, North Korea new axis ==
In February 2022, American conservative political commentator Danielle Pletka called China, Russia, Iran, and North Korea as the "new" axis of evil in an article for the National Review. Following the 2022 Russian invasion of Ukraine, the Taipei Times published an editorial calling the alliance between Russia and China "the real axis of evil".

In October 2023, Senate Republican Leader Mitch McConnell told CBS' "Face The Nation" that Iran, North Korea, Russia, and China are the new "axis of evil. The Speaker of the House, Mike Johnson, echoed a very similar comment on Fox News' "Hannity".

In October 2023, Israeli Prime Minister Benjamin Netanyahu described an axis of evil involving Hamas and Iran in an op-ed in The Wall Street Journal.

In January 2024, NATO Secretary General Jens Stoltenberg and his predecessor, Anders Fogh Rasmussen, cautioned about the formation of a new axis of autocracies led by China, but joined by Russia, Iran and North Korea. The same states have been recognized as a new axis of evil by several American politicians, including Christopher Cavoli, Mike Johnson, and Mitch McConnell.

On April 17, 2024, GOP U.S. speaker of the house Mike Johnson referred to China as part of "the axis of evil" that also includes Iran and Russia. Johnson based his statement on the belief that the countries pose threats the western-aligned countries of Taiwan, Israel, and Ukraine. This preceded a change of tact, where the speaker decided to support $95 billion of defence aid for the combined countries, despite the opposition of the more conservative members of his caucus.

In July 2024, British Army General Sir Patrick Sanders said that Russia, China and Iran were the "new axis powers" in an interview with The Times. He argued they posed more of a threat than Nazi Germany in 1939, stating "They are more interdependent and more aligned than the original axis powers were" and that the world is facing "as dangerous a moment as any time that we've had since 1945". On July 23, newly appointed Army chief General Sir Roland Walker said in a speech that the UK faced danger from an "axis of upheaval" with threats from an angered Russia, that China was intent on retaking Taiwan, and that Iran was likely to pursue nuclear weapons.

== Criticism ==
Iran and Iraq fought the long Iran–Iraq War in the 1980s under basically the same leadership as that which existed at the time of Bush's speech, leading some to believe that the linking of the nations under the same banner was misguided. Others argued that each of the three nations in the "axis of evil" had some special characteristics which were obscured by grouping them together. Anne Applebaum wrote about the debate over North Korea's inclusion in the group.

In the days after the September 11 attacks, Ryan Crocker — who would later become the United States ambassador to Iraq from 2007 to 2009 — and other senior U.S. State Department officials flew to Geneva to meet secretly with representatives of the government of Iran. For several months, Crocker and his Iranian counterparts cooperated on capturing Al Qaeda operatives in the region and fighting the Taliban government in Afghanistan. These meetings stopped after the "Axis of Evil" speech hardened Iranian attitudes toward cooperating with the U.S. Crocker was reportedlay one of "many senior diplomats" who was surprised by the labeling.

Also, immediately after the attacks, the Iranian President Mohammad Khatami—in a message to the American people—showed sympathy with the victims and the Iranian people took to mosques and streets to pray and show their condolences. None of the terrorists involved in 9/11 were citizens of the three nations Bush cited.

== Other axes ==
In January 2006, Israeli Defense Minister Shaul Mofaz implicated "the axis of terror that operates between Iran and Syria" following a suicide bomb in Tel Aviv.

In April 2006 the phrase axis of terror earned more publicity. Israel's UN Ambassador, Dan Gillerman, cautioned of a new axis of terror—Iran, Syria and the Hamas-run Palestinian government; Gillerman repeated the term before the UN over the crisis in Lebanon. Some three months later Israeli senior foreign ministry official Gideon Meir branded the alleged alliance an axis of terror and hate.

In 2006, Isaias Afewerki, the president of Eritrea, had declared in response to the deteriorating relations with the neighboring countries of Ethiopia, Sudan and Yemen by accusing them of being an "Axis of Belligerence."

In 2006, the former president of Venezuela, Hugo Chávez, described the so-called New Latin Left as an "axis of good" which comprised Bolivia, Chile, Cuba, Ecuador, Nicaragua, Uruguay and Venezuela but described "Washington and its allies" as an "axis of evil".

In 2007, the commander of Iran's Islamic Revolutionary Guard Corps declared that the United States, the United Kingdom and Israel were part of an "axis of evil" alleging mass violence against the Islamic world, crimes against humanity and attempting to divide Shi'ites and Sunnis.

In 2008, The Economist featured an article about the "Axis of Diesel" in reference to a burgeoning alliance of Iran, Russia, and Venezuela. They cite the billions of dollars in arms sales to Venezuela and the construction of Iranian nuclear facilities as well as the rejection of added sanctions on Iran. They did conclude that the benefits of the arrangement were exaggerated, however.

From 2010 onward, the term "Axis of Resistance" has been used to describe an anti-Western and anti-Israeli alliance between Iran, Syria, Hezbollah, Iraqi Shia militias, and the Houthis.

In 2012, author William C. Martel, in a short essay for The Diplomat, wrote of an "Authoritarian Axis", comprising China, Russia, Iran, North Korea, Syria, and Venezuela. Following the death of Venezuela's Hugo Chávez in 2013, Martel removed Venezuela from the assigned list of countries, in his subsequent writings about the "axis". Martel's thesis drew criticism from The American Conservative and Muslim Village, with the main arguments cited in opposition to his idea being the lack of cohesion and generally low levels of cooperation shown between the cited countries.

Several environmental non-governmental organizations, including Greenpeace and the Green Party of Canada, have dubbed Australia, Canada and United States, the "Axis of Environmental Evil" because of their lack of support for international environmental agreements, particularly those related to climate change.

During a March 2018 interview with the Egyptian media, Saudi Crown Prince Mohammad bin Salman referred Iran, Turkey and Islamist organizations such as the Islamic State and the Muslim Brotherhood as the "triangle of evil", to describe their current policies in the Middle East. Those remarks were later dismissed by Iran, describing it as "childish" and said that Saudi Arabia's intervention in Yemen has "caused instability and extremism and stuck in a quagmire" in Yemen.

In October 2018, the economist Paul Krugman tweeted, "[t]here's a new axis of evil: Russia, Saudi Arabia—and the United States", the three countries that declined to endorse the United Nations' latest climate study at the 2018 United Nations Climate Change Conference.

== Media's use of the term ==
=== Parodies ===
Various related pun phrases include:

- Axis of weasels – mocking certain countries that did not support the 2003 invasion of Iraq
- Axis of Eve – a women's political action group that opposed Bush through satirical expression
- Asses of evil – a mocking insult against George W. Bush, Dick Cheney and John Ashcroft
- Axles of evil – denouncing sport utility vehicles for their poor fuel efficiency, and several other variations
- Coalition of the drilling – mocking the 'coalition of the willing', stating the possible goal behind the "willing" in getting access to oil
- "Axes of Evil" – the title of a song by the Canadian heavy metal band 3 Inches of Blood and the title of a book about Billy the Axeman
- The Axis of Awesome – an Australian musical comedy act

The term has also lent itself to various parodies, including the following:

- In a Saturday Night Live skit with host Jonny Moseley, George W. Bush played by Will Ferrell expands the "Axis of Evil" (although he doesn't mention North Korea, instead saying "one of the Koreas") to include things with "evil" in it or things he does not understand (including Enron, Tom Daschle, the economy, France, those who "mess with Texas", the "original Axis of Evil", mathematics, Dick Cheney (for now), and Evel Knievel, with the exception of Dr. Evil). Ferrell mispronounces "axis" so it sounds like "Access of Evil".
- Serj Tankian, lead singer for the group System of a Down and Tom Morello, guitarist and former guitarist for Rage Against the Machine and Audioslave (respectively) founded a political action group called the Axis of Justice.
- Andrew Marlatt wrote an extensive parody for SatireWire, where Libya, China, and Syria formed the "Axis of Just as Evil" and other countries "rushed to gain triumvirate status" in a "game of geopolitical chairs".
- The Economist ran a 2006 (May 13–19) cover headline titled "Axis of Feeble" about the end of the George Bush–Tony Blair partnership.
- King Dedede, a character from the Kirby series, refers to the titular character as an "axis of evil" in an episode of the Japanese version of the anime.
- In the Top Gear Middle East Special, during a road trip through Syria, Jeremy Clarkson installs an "axle of evil" to make his Mazda MX-5 a six-wheeled vehicle.
- In Total Drama Presents: The Ridonculous Race, Sanders refers to the super-team composed of the Ice Dancers, the Police Cadets and the Haters as an "axis of evil". Don later coins them as such (to the displeasure of Ryan) and liking the sound of it, they form an alliance with the intent of backstabbing each other, though it later falls apart.

=== Comedy tour ===
In response to the problems which Americans of Middle-Eastern descent have in the current climate, a group of comedians have banded together to form the Axis of Evil Comedy Tour. The comedians, Ahmed Ahmed (from Egypt), Maz Jobrani (from Iran), and Aron Kader (whose father is Palestinian), have created a show which aired on Comedy Central. They have also included half-Palestinian, half-Italian Dean Obeidallah in some of their acts.

The group took the comedy tour around the Middle East (November–December 2007), performing in the UAE, Egypt, Kuwait, Jordan, and Lebanon to sell-out crowds.

=== Lullabies ===
In 2003 the Norwegian record label Kirkelig Kulturverksted published the CD Lullabies from the Axis of Evil containing 14 lullabies from Iran, Iraq, North Korea, Palestine, Syria, Afghanistan and Cuba. Every lullaby is presented in its original form sung by women from these countries, and then a western version with interpretations in English.

=== Other ===
- Holidays in the Axis of Evil is a documentary by BBC
- Literature from the "Axis of Evil"
- Behind Enemy Lines II: Axis of Evil is a direct to video film
- Empire of Evil (documentary film)
- Team America: World Police comedy film
- In Metal Gear Rising: Revengeance, after Operation Tecumseh, commentators label even allied Pakistan as a member of the axis of evil
- The song "Axis Of Evil" by "Sodom" in their self-titled album Sodom

== See also ==
- Anti-American sentiment
- Anti-Western sentiment
- CRINK
- Jakarta–Peking Axis
- Troika of tyranny
- Evil Empire speech
- Dual containment
- Great Satan
- Outposts of tyranny
- Second Cold War
- State terrorism
- State-sponsored terrorism
