= Defending Identity =

2008 book by Natan Sharansky

Defending Identity: Its Indispensable Role in Protecting Democracy
- Author: Natan Sharansky with Shira Wolosky Weiss
- Language: English
- Genre: Non-fiction
- Publisher: Public Affairs
- Publication date: 2008
- Publication place: United States
- English publication date: June 1, 2008
- Media type: Print (hardback & paperback)
- Pages: 234 pp.
- Preceded by: The Case for Democracy

Defending Identity: Its Indispensable Role in Protecting Democracy is the third book by Natan Sharansky, published on June 1, 2008, by Public Affairs.

== Overview ==
In Defending Identity, Sharansky presents nationalism and religious commitment as a "force for good," not merely an ideology of evil. "Strong identities are as valuable to a well-functioning society as they are to ... well-functioning individuals." He writes that "without identity, a democracy becomes incapable of defending the values it holds most dear." He says religious identity "is very difficult to neutralize with rational argument, because what, after all, is the totalitarian regime trying to do? It’s trying to discover rational arguments to prove your physical survival [depends on obedience]."

Sharansky makes a provocative argument against Western intellectuals who have increasingly come to see religion and nationalism as antithetical to freedom. Jonathan S. Tobin writes that "Sharansky reminds us democracies can't defend themselves without 'identity'".

Ira Stoll writes that, “If the next American president reads this latest book by Mr. Sharansky on the interplay between identity, democracy, and freedom, it could be more important than any CIA or State Department briefing in understanding the foreign policy horizon."
