= David Plunkert =

American graphic designer

- Education: Shepherd University (BFA, 1987)
- Known for: Illustration, graphic design
- Notable work: Blowhard (The New Yorker, 2017)
- Awards: Best Poster Award, SXSW (2009); Member, Alliance Graphique Internationale (2011)
- Website: davidplunkert.com

David Plunkert is an American illustrator and graphic designer based in Baltimore, Maryland. He is best known for his editorial illustrations and theater posters. His illustrations are highly conceptual, in two styles, Dada influenced collage and spare blocky graphics.

== Education ==
Plunkert graduated from Shepherd University in 1987.

== Career ==
Plunkert and his wife Joyce Hesselberth co-founded Spur Design, a graphic design and illustration studio, in 1995.

Plunkert's work has appeared on the pages of Esquire, Forbes, GQ, The New Yorker, Time, Reader's Digest, Playboy and Rolling Stone magazines, as well as in The New York Times and The Wall Street Journal. Plunkert has also worked extensively with publishers and recording artists. Among his credits are the covers for Natan Sharansky’s Case for Democracy and Richard Thompson’s You? me? us? Major clients have included MTV, Nike, and Capitol Records.

Plunkert was included in the group show “America Illustrata” which completed its international tour in 2000. His work is in the collections of the Library of Congress, the Cooper-Hewitt, National Design Museum, The University of California Design Museum, and the Museum für Kunst und Gewerbe in Hamburg.

Plunkert has produced illustrations for the 2000 Sundance Film Festival and for Woodstock 94. In 1995 he created the art for the "Yugo Next" exhibition poster at New York's Grand Central Terminal. The National Endowment of the Arts in Washington, DC described "Yugo Next" as "one of the greatest ever examples of public art."

On August 17, 2017, Plunkert tweeted his cover art for the following week's edition of The New Yorker. The illustration, entitled Blowhard, depicted U.S. president Donald Trump sitting in a sailboat, blowing a sail that was styled as a KKK hood. The artwork, a reaction to Trump's remarks on the Unite the Right rally in Charlottesville, Virginia, was widely covered in U.S. news media. Plunkert stated, "President Trump's weak pushback to hate groups – as if he was trying not to alienate them as voters – compelled me to take up my pen."

== Awards and recognition ==
In 2009, Plunkert received the Best Poster Award at the South by Southwest Festival (SXSW) for the poster he designed for Antidote Films' documentary The Dungeon Masters.

In 2011 Plunkert was inducted into the Alliance Graphique Internationale. He has received medals from the Society of Illustrators in New York.

== Bibliography ==
- "Visualizing Finance 1.0: Developing a Common Language" Visualizing Finance Lab ISBN 978-1-62407-430-1
- Steven Heller, Talarico Lita ed. "Typography Sketchbooks" Princeton Architectural Press ISBN 1616890428
- Ellen Lupton, Jennifer Cole Phillips. "Graphic Design: The New Basics" Princeton Architectural Press ISBN 1568987706
- Robin Landa. "Graphic Design Solutions" Wadsworth Publishing ISBN 978-0-495-57281-7
- John Foster, ed. "1,000 Indie Posters" Rockport Publishers ISBN 1592536565
- Marvin Scott Jarrett, ed. "Raygun Out of Control" Simon & Schuster ISBN 0684839806
- John Foster, ed. "New Masters of Poster Design: Poster Design ISBN 1-59253-222-5
- American Illustration: Eds. 9, 12-30, Vol 25 ISBN 1-886212-25-2
- David E. Carter, ed. "The New Big Book of Color" ISBN 0-06-113767-7
- Ochs, Michael ed., "The Greatest Album Covers That Never Were" ISBN 0-9740078-0-3
- Pitzer, Chris ed., "Project: Telstar" Adhouse Books 2003, ISBN 0-9721794-2-9
- Sullivan, Jenny, ed. "Graphic Design America" Rockport Publishers, 2005, ISBN 1-59253-126-1
- "2 Color Graphics", Rockport Publishers, 2004, ISBN 1-59253-092-3

== Interviews and articles ==
- Meggs, Philip B., "Edgy Baltimore," Print (magazine), Vol XLIX:III, May/June 1995
- Graphis 305, Volume 25, September/October 1996
- Showroom, Novum World of Graphic Design, September 2003
- Graphis 351, Volume 60, May/June 2004
- Mooth, Bryn, "The Man with Two Brains," How Design & Illustration, August 2006
- American Illustration - American Photography "Profile", April, 2015
