= The Case for Democracy =

2004 book by Natan Sharansky and Ron Dermer

The Case for Democracy. The Power of Freedom to Overcome Tyranny and Terror
- Author: Natan Sharansky and Ron Dermer
- Cover artist: David Plunkert
- Language: English
- Genre: Non-fiction
- Publisher: Public Affairs
- Publication date: 2004
- Publication place: United States
- Media type: Print (hardback & paperback)
- ISBN: 1-58648-261-0
- OCLC: 56367829
- Dewey Decimal: 321.8 22
- LC Class: JC423 .S495 2004
- Preceded by: Fear No Evil
- Followed by: Defending Identity

The Case for Democracy is a foreign policy manifesto written by one-time Soviet political prisoner and former Israeli Member of the Knesset, Natan Sharansky. Sharansky's friend Ron Dermer is the book's co-author. The book achieved the bestsellers lists of the New York Times, Washington Post and Foreign Affairs.

In the book, Sharansky and Dermer argue that the primary goal of American foreign policy, as well as that of the free world, should be the expansion of democracy. The book advocates a moral foreign policy based on belief in the universality of freedom and human rights. Sharansky and Dermer argue that nations that respect their citizens will also respect their neighbors. The book is sub-titled, The Power of Freedom to Overcome Tyranny and Terror. The authors express passionate and controversial arguments against any compromise on the road to freedom.

It has been read and famously endorsed by former United States president George W. Bush. Other members of his administration, including former Secretary of State Condoleezza Rice, have also read the book.

== See also ==
- Defending Identity
- Town square test

== Sources ==
- Natan Sharansky, Ron Dermer, The Case for Democracy. The Power of Freedom to Overcome Tyranny and Terror, (2004, ISBN 1-58648-261-0, hardcover) (2006, ISBN 0-89221-644-1 paperback).
