= Atom bomb (disambiguation) =

The atom bomb is a nuclear weapon.

Atom(ic) bomb may also refer to:

- Atomic Bomb (album), a 1997 album by Filipino rock band Rivermaya
- Atom Bomb (album), a 2005 album by The Blind Boys of Alabama
- "Atom Bomb" (song), a song on Fluke's 1996 album Risotto
- Atom Bomb (film), a 1964 Malayalam language film

== See also ==
- A-bomb (disambiguation)
