= Rogue state =

Country considered a threat to world peace

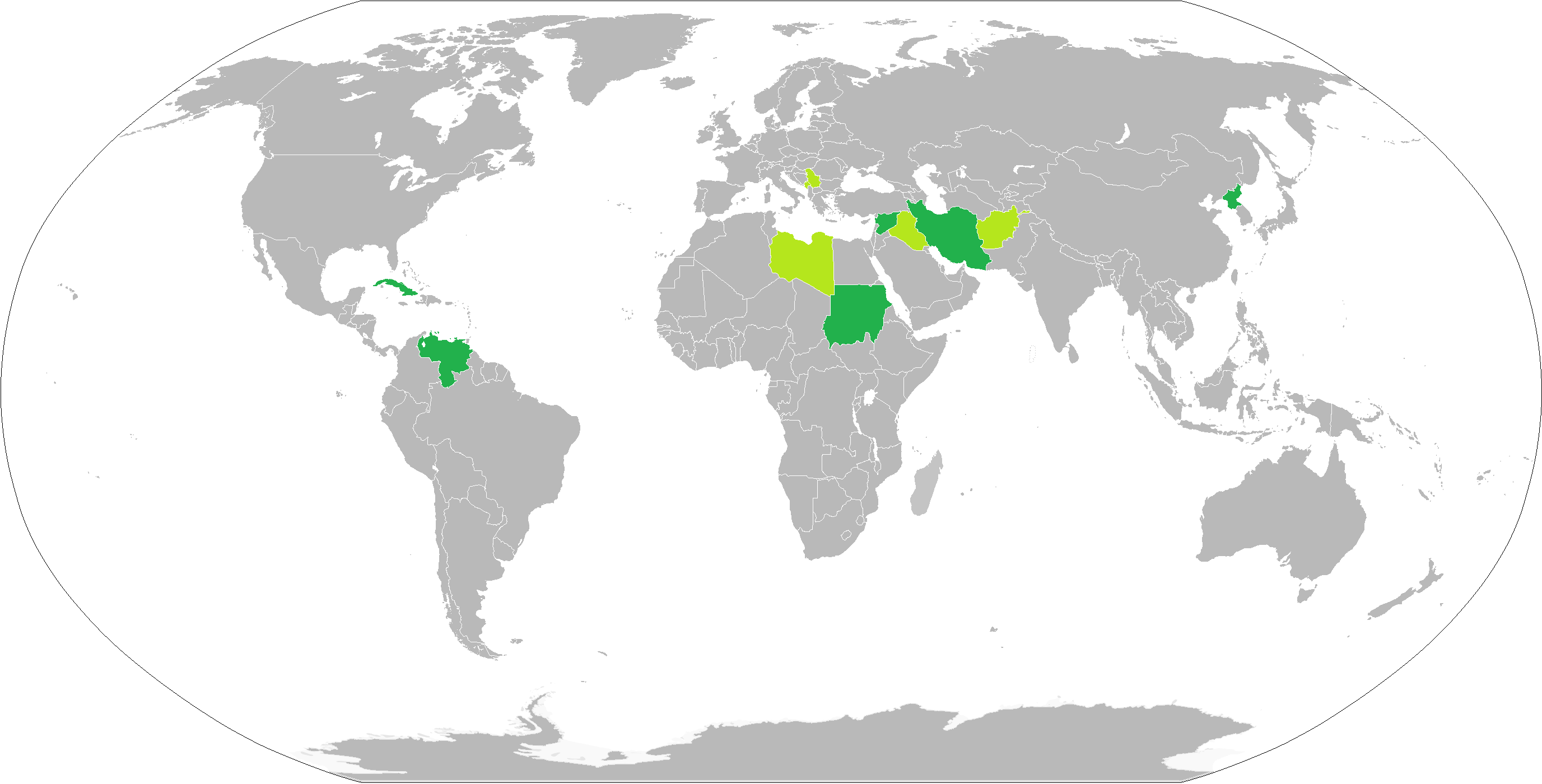
Map showing rogue states

"Rogue state" (or sometimes "outlaw state") is a term applied predominantly by the United States government after the end of the Cold War to adversarial states supposedly linked to terrorism, regional aggression, weapons of mass destruction, and narcotics trafficking. U.S. politicians have used the term to describe Iran, Ba'athist Syria, North Korea, Afghanistan, Cuba and Venezuela, as well as other countries.

== Usage by the United States ==
As early as July 1985, President Ronald Reagan stated that "we are not going to tolerate … attacks from outlaw states by the strangest collection of misfits, looney tunes, and squalid criminals since the advent of the Third Reich," but it fell to the Clinton administration to elaborate on this concept. In the 1994 issue of Foreign Affairs, U.S. National Security Advisor Anthony Lake labelled five nations as rogue states: North Korea, Cuba, Iran, Libya under Muammar Gaddafi, and Iraq under Saddam Hussein. He described these regimes as "recalcitrant and outlaw states that not only choose to remain outside the family but also assault its basic values".

In the last six months of the Clinton administration, U.S. Secretary of State Madeleine Albright announced that the term rogue state would be abolished in June 2000, in favour of the term states of concern.

Libya was removed from the State Sponsors of Terrorism list in 2006 after achieving success through diplomacy. Relations with Libya also became more mutual following the eight month Libyan Civil War in 2011, which resulted in the National Transitional Council ousting longtime Libyan leader Muammar Gaddafi from power.

In 2015, after the US reopened its embassy in Cuba and restarted diplomatic relations with the Cuban government, Cuba was removed from the list of State sponsors of terrorism and was no longer referred to as a "rogue state". After a breakdown in relations in the first Trump administration, Cuba was re-added to the state sponsors of terrorism list, where it remains as of 2026.

In the 2010s, the administration of U.S. President Donald Trump labelled Venezuela a "rogue state". During the 2017 UN general assembly, UN ambassador Nikki Haley called Venezuela a global threat and a "dangerous narco-state". Some figures of the Venezuelan government, like Vice President Tareck el Aissami and Minister of Defense Vladimir Padrino López, were permanently banned from entering US territory, due to their involvement with human rights abuses and drug cartels. Later in 2017, the US government banned all high ranking Venezuelan government officials from entering US territory. Currently, due to the 2019 Venezuelan presidential crisis, Nicolas Maduro's government (which controls Venezuela de facto) is not recognized as legitimate by the United States or most other states in the Western Hemisphere, with the exceptions of Cuba, Dominica, Nicaragua, Saint Kitts and Nevis, Saint Vincent and the Grenadines, and Suriname.

On 19 June 2020, U.S. Secretary of State Mike Pompeo called the People's Republic of China a "rogue actor" at the Virtual Copenhagen Democracy Summit, saying that "General Secretary Xi Jinping has green-lighted a brutal campaign of repression against Chinese Muslims, a human rights violation on a scale we haven’t seen since World War II." In addition, Pompeo cited China's handling of COVID-19, "malicious cyber campaigns" it conducted, and its treatment of Hong Kong citizens as reasons for labeling China as a rogue actor. After Russia invaded Ukraine, as Sino-Russian relations became increasingly close with establishment of North Korean–Russian Partnership, this term was also used to refer to Russia in think tanks.

=== Later terms ===
In the aftermath of the September 11 attacks, the Bush administration returned to using a similar term. The concept of rogue states was replaced by the Bush administration with the concept of an Axis of Evil, which encompassed Iraq, Iran, and North Korea. U.S. President George W. Bush first spoke of this "Axis of Evil" during his January 2002 State of the Union Address. More terms, such as Outposts of Tyranny, would follow suit.

Because the U.S. government remains the most active proponent of the expression rogue state, the term has received much criticism from those who disagree with American foreign policy. Both the concepts of rogue states and the Axis of Evil have been criticized by scholars, including philosopher Jacques Derrida and linguist Noam Chomsky, who considered it more or less a justification of imperialism and a useful word for propaganda. Some critics charge that rogue state merely means any state that is generally hostile to the U.S., or even one that opposes the U.S. without necessarily posing a wider threat.

=== United States as a rogue state ===
Some critics of US foreign policy describe the United States as a rogue state. William Blum's 2000 book Rogue State: A Guide to the World's Only Superpower suggests that US-led interventions around the world during and after the Cold War have threatened the world's peace. Noam Chomsky has also described the US as a rogue state after the assassination of Qasem Soleimani. Its nuclear proliferation and large numbers of nuclear warheads (the second most in the world), sponsorship of terrorist or guerilla groups to overthrow opposing governments especially in Latin America, and violations of human rights in wartime are all suggested to be characteristics of a rogue state. The US has also passed a law threatening to invade The Hague if American officials or military personnel were to ever be prosecuted for war crimes called the American Service-Members' Protection Act.

== Usage by Turkey ==
On 23 February 1999, Turkish President Süleyman Demirel described Greece as a "rogue state" because of its alleged support of the Kurdistan Workers' Party (PKK). Demirel said "Greece serves as a sanctuary for members of the PKK seeking shelter and provides training facilities and logistics to the terrorists."

On 28 June 2012, after the shooting down of a Turkish warplane by the Syrian Army during the Syrian civil war, Turkish Prime Minister Recep Tayyip Erdoğan declared Syria to be a "rogue state". In October 2020, Erdoğan described Armenia as a rogue state, referring to the Second Nagorno-Karabakh War. He used the words "countries supporting rogue state Armenia in its occupation of Karabakh would have to face the common conscience of humanity". Commentator Robert Ellis, writing in the British newspaper The Independent in 2016, claimed that Turkey under Erdoğan risks "being regarded as a rogue state" due to its increasingly authoritarian government, the deterioration of the human rights in the country, the Turkish government's involvement in Syria and its alleged support of terrorist groups.

Similarly, Erdoğan said after a cabinet meeting on 5 October 2020: "It is not possible for humanity to attain permanent peace and tranquility without saving the world from rogue states and their rogue rulers. Especially in our region, the number of rogue states is quite high. These rogue states, dating back to Israel, Greek Administration of Cyprus and the Syrian regime, persecute their own citizens and destabilize the world."

== See also ==
- Axis of evil
- Failed state
- Narco state
- Rump state
- International isolation
- Mission: Impossible – Rogue Nation
- Pariah state
- State Sponsors of Terrorism
- Troika of tyranny
- Coup belt
