= Troika of tyranny =

US foreign policy terminology from the 2010s

Bolton's "troika of tyranny" comprised Cuba, Nicaragua and Venezuela The United States

Troika of tyranny (Spanish: troika de la tiranía), from Russian тройка, meaning 'a set of three' (trine, trio), is a description of the nations of Cuba, Nicaragua and Venezuela used by John Bolton (at that time United States National Security Advisor) in 2018 in outlining United States foreign policy towards those nations. Bolton has alternately described the three countries as the "triangle of terror" and the "three stooges of socialism", stating that the three are "the cause of immense human suffering, the impetus of enormous regional instability, and the genesis of a sordid cradle of communism in the western hemisphere".

The United States has condemned actions of the governments of the three Latin American nations and has maintained both broad and targeted sanctions against their leadership.

== Background ==
We will not reward firing squads, torturers, and murderers.

We will champion the independence and liberty of our neighbors.

And this President, and his entire administration, will stand with the freedom fighters.

The Troika of Tyranny in this Hemisphere—Cuba, Venezuela, and Nicaragua—has finally met its match.

— John Bolton, November 1, 2018

The phrase troika of tyranny was first used by U.S. National Security Advisor Bolton during a speech on behalf of President Donald Trump at Miami Dade College on 1 November 2018 to describe the nations of Cuba, Nicaragua and Venezuela. According to The Wall Street Journal, on his second day in office, Trump asked Fernando Cutz—who had worked for the Barack Obama administration on Cuba relations—to brief him on ways to reverse Obama's Cuba policies.

Bolton previously worked with the George W. Bush administration to define Beyond the Axis of Evil as the addition of Cuba, Libya and Syria to Bush's already existing axis of evil. As millions fled the economic collapse and political persecution during the crisis in Venezuela and hundreds were killed by the Daniel Ortega administration during the 2018–2020 Nicaraguan protests—with both governments directly supported by Cuba—the United States government condemned the actions performed by the three countries.

In the 1 November 2018 speech, Ambassador Bolton made announcements concerning United States foreign policy towards these three nations. Bolton condemned the nations of Cuba, Nicaragua and Venezuela for their actions against their citizens. Bolton praised the elections of right-wing presidents in Latin America including Ivan Duque of Colombia and Jair Bolsonaro of Brazil. He also condemned socialism saying "the problems we see in Latin America today have not emerged because socialism has been implemented poorly. On the contrary, the Cuban, Venezuelan, and Nicaraguan people suffer in misery because socialism has been implemented effectively" and that the troika was "the cause of immense human suffering, the impetus of enormous regional instability, and the genesis of a sordid cradle of communism in the western hemisphere". Bolton concluded his speech stating "Look to the North; look to our flag; look to your own. The Troika will crumble. The people will triumph. And, the righteous flame of freedom will burn brightly again in this Hemisphere".

During the Venezuelan presidential crisis, John Bolton mentioned the "troika of tyranny" concept while discussing the security of United States business assets and the shifting of funds to the Juan Guaidó government, saying that "Venezuela's one of the three countries I call the 'troika of tyranny'. It'll make a big difference to the United States economically if we could have American oil companies really invest in and produce the oil capabilities in Venezuela. It'd be good for the people of Venezuela, it'd be good for the people of the United States." According to The Wall Street Journal, Venezuela is not the only policy concern for the United States, but also Cuba, whose "intelligence is deeply integrated in the Venezuelan military and the security apparatus of the Maduro government", and the strengthening ties between both countries, as well as Russia, China and Iran. South American is a source of Iran's financial backing of Hezbollah, and Venezuelan Minister of Labor Tareck El Aissami allegedly helped provide them the means to launder money through Venezuela.

In a speech on 17 April 2019 in Miami on the anniversary of the failed 1961 Bay of Pigs Invasion, Bolton announced new restrictions on U.S. dealings with the three countries.

== Sanctions ==
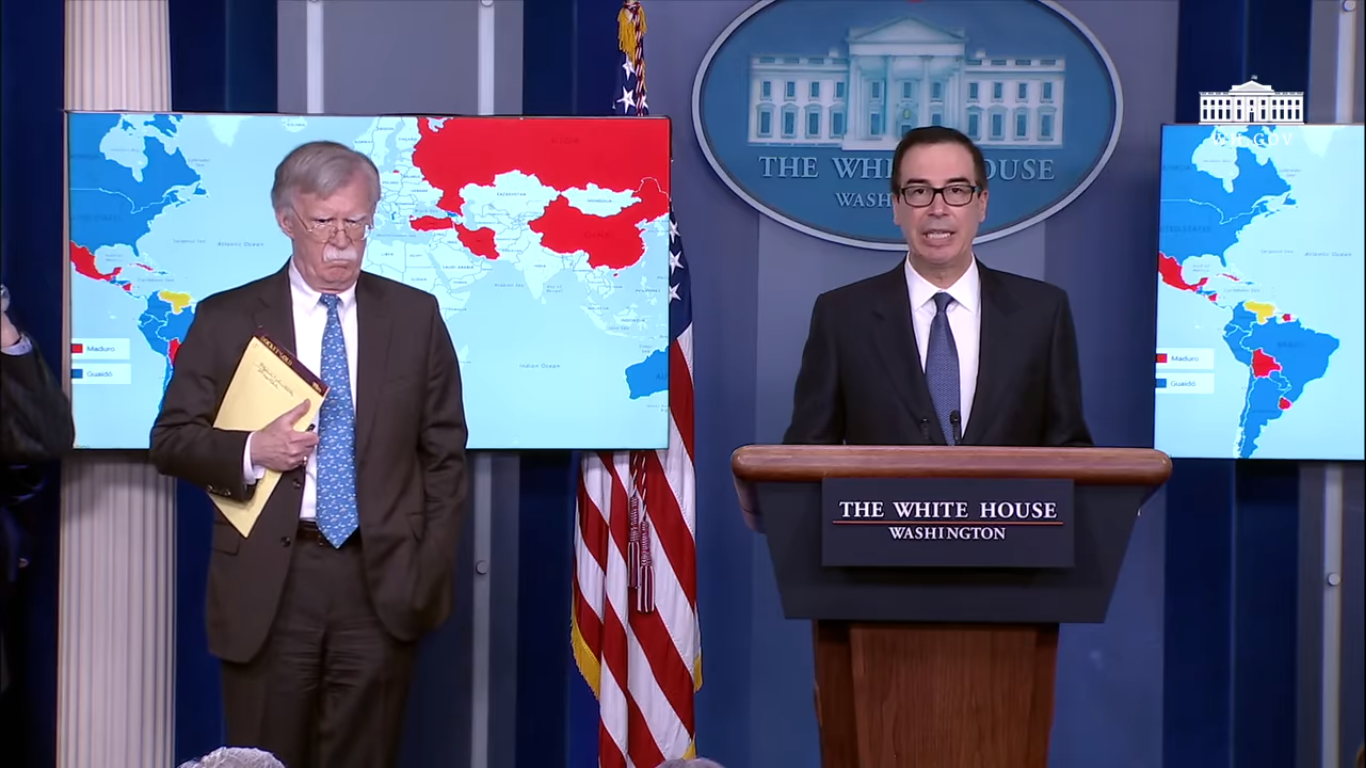
U.S. National Security Advisor John Bolton (left) and Treasury Secretary Steven Mnuchin (right) announce Venezuela sanctions in January 2019.

The United States has condemned actions of the governments of the three Latin American nations and has maintained both broad and targeted sanctions against their leadership.

=== Cuba ===
On 1 November 2018, Bolton said more than "two dozen entities owned or controlled by the Cuban military and intelligence services" would be sanctioned. He also promised that the US would impose sanctions to prevent financing of Cuba's security forces from the U.S. and until Cuba "frees political prisoners, allows for freedom of speech, embraces all political parties, and ensures fair elections". New sanctions against Cuba were intended to "ratchet up U.S. pressure on Havana to end its support for Venezuela's socialist president, Nicolás Maduro", according to Reuters press agency. However, the move soon received criticism from US allies, as companies within their nations that operate amicably in Cuba would be negatively affected, too; the Cuban government said that the measures were "an attack on international law".

The main sanction levied against Cuba in April 2019 was introducing the provisions of Title III of the Helms–Burton Act (1996), allowing US citizens to file lawsuits in the US against people and companies who may own or be benefiting from property confiscated in Cuba since the 1959 revolution. Though the Act was passed in 1996, no President had ever enacted Title III. The implication of this act is that large amounts of lands were stolen across the island, and so people and businesses from around the world who were granted or bought the land may not know if it was stolen but still could be sued under this measure.

Restrictions on travel to Cuba, which had been relaxed by Obama, were tightened to restrict movement of US citizens to and from the island to only those with relatives in Cuba. Bolton said this was necessary because Obama had "provided the Cuban regime with the necessary political cover to expand its malign influence"; Mike Pompeo said on the same day that Obama's Cuba policy was "a black mark on this great nation’s long record of defending human rights". The US also introduced a restriction on money transfer to Cuba, limiting this to $1000 per person per quarter; the increase in money being sent had aided growth of the Cuban economy. Separate to these restrictions, sanctions were levied against five entities; one of these is the military-owned Cuban airline Aerogaviota.

=== Nicaragua ===
The Trump administration began to sanction Nicaragua unless there are democratic elections, and the targeting of protestors stops. The Atlantic said that the 17 April sanctions were a sign that the US intends to "apply more pressure to oust Venezuela's authoritarian leader, Nicolás Maduro, by taking on the repressive socialist governments in Cuba and Nicaragua as well", though the measures against Nicaragua were comparatively minor.

The April 2019 sanctions against Nicaragua affect the financial company Banco Corporativo SA (Bancorp) and Rosario Murillo, a son of President Daniel Ortega, for corruption.

=== Venezuela ===
Bolton said in November 2018 that the Trump administration policy would be to place sanctions on Venezuela until it releases political prisoners, permits the entrance of humanitarian aid, holds free elections and upholds democracy and the rule of law.

During the 2019 Venezuelan presidential crisis, more sanctions were implemented, primarily against Venezuela and Cuba, but also affecting Nicaragua. The main sanctions to all three nations were announced on 17 April 2019 by Bolton and included a large-scale rollback of President Barack Obama's policies on Cuba–Venezuela relations. In the same address, Bolton gave implicit threats to Cuban and Russian security forces operating within Venezuela; he warned "all external actors, including Russia" not to support the Maduro administration. The Atlantic described the measures as a "slow suffocation" of the nations and their assets.

The April 2019 sanctions directly against Venezuela were overtly financial, being against the Central Bank of Venezuela with the aim to restrict the Maduro government's access to US dollars and financing, which Bolton says are "crucial to keeping Maduro in power".

== Reception ==
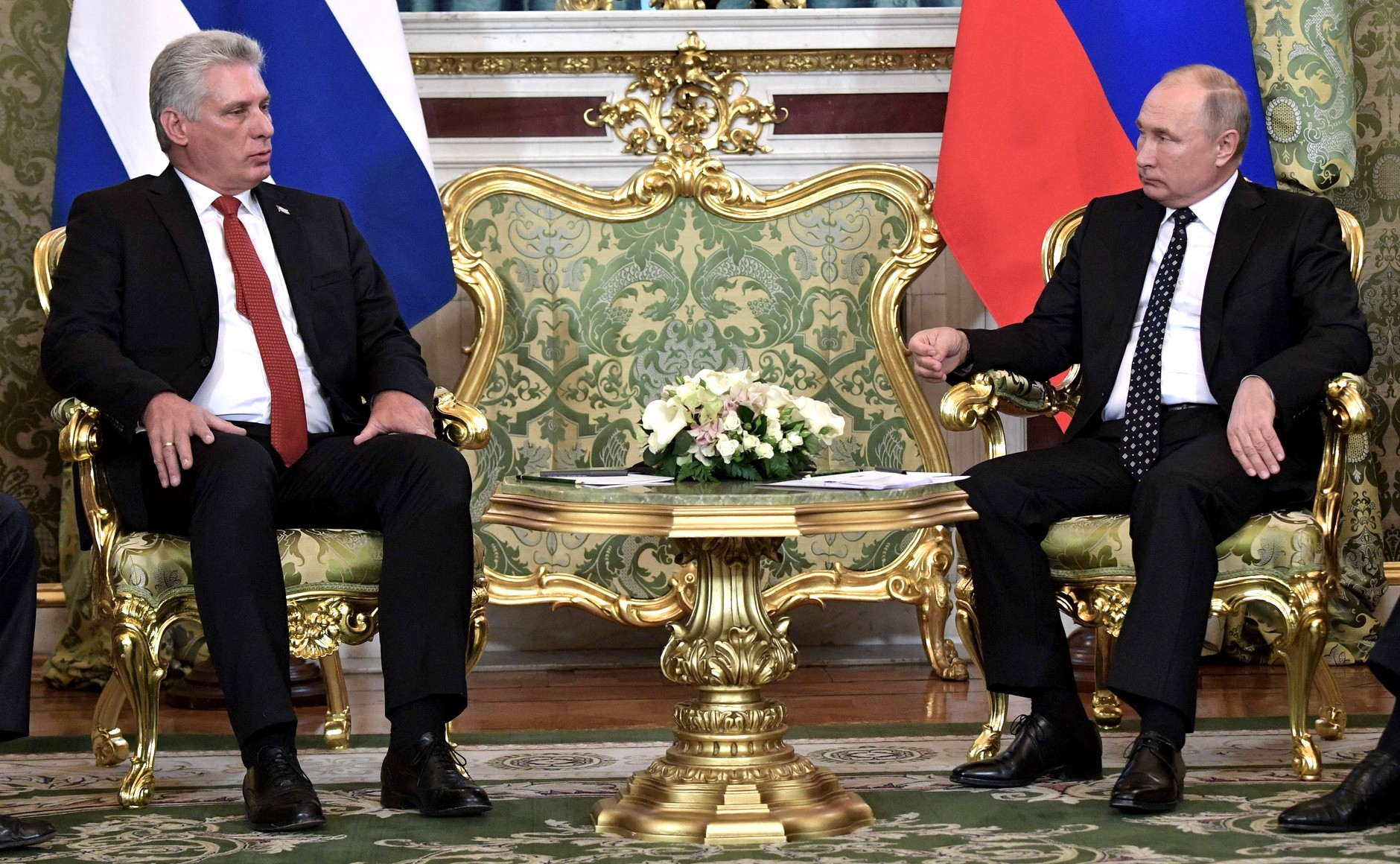
Cuba's president, Miguel Díaz-Canel with Vladimir Putin at the Kremlin, November 2, 2018

Due to the proximity of the 1 November speech to the 2018 United States elections and its location in Florida, Columbia University professor and Latin American expert Christopher Sabatini referenced Bolton's audience of Cuban, Nicaraguan and Venezuelan-Americans, stating that it was "no coincidence that this speech is being made where there are tight races for governor and for Congress. It is just another example of how our policy in the hemisphere is driven by local politics, and it's sad".

Vox's Alex Ward criticized the Trump administration's condemnation of the "troika" while aligning itself with the far-right Bolsonaro in Brazil and found it ironic that Bolton applauded the freedoms provided to Cuban, Nicaraguan and Venezuelan–Americans in the audience while the Trump government banned those fleeing from oppression entry into the United States. Ward said the targeting of civilians by Ortega's government in Nicaragua was "unlikely to change anytime soon, as more than 300 people died during protests against the government this year".

The Guardian described the November 2018 speech used by Bolton as "bellicose" and that such statements were "likely to stoke growing fears in Latin America that Washington could recruit rightwing governments in Brazil and Colombia to take military action against Venezuela". The Atlantic stated that the April 2019 speech was "not exactly subtle".

Reuters reported that the April 2019 announcement "drew swift criticism from European and Canadian allies, whose companies have significant interests in Cuba". Sherritt International (Canadian) and Meliá Hotels International (Spain) have invested heavily in Cuba; the European Union stated it will use all options to "protect its legitimate interests", and Canada's Foreign Minister Chrystia Freeland said Canada was "deeply disappointed" with the announcement. Trump's position on the triad has "gone down well among Cuban Americans in south Florida".

Cuba labeled the sanctions "an attack on international law"; president Miguel Díaz-Canel said, "No one will rip the (fatherland) away from us, neither by seduction nor by force. We Cubans do not surrender." Maduro said the sanctions were "totally illegal" and that "Central banks around the world are sacred, all countries respect them. ... To me the empire looks crazy, desperate."

== See also ==
- ALBA
- Axis of evil
- CRINK
- Outposts of tyranny
- Parole for Cubans, Haitians, Nicaraguans, and Venezuelans
- Rogue state
