= Town square test =

Threshold for a free society

Town square test is a threshold test for a free society proposed by a former Soviet dissident and human rights activist Natan Sharansky, now a notable politician in Israel.

In his book The Case for Democracy, published in 2004, Sharansky explains the term: "If a person cannot walk into the middle of the town square and express his or her views without fear of arrest, imprisonment, or physical harm, then that person is living in a fear society, not a free society. We cannot rest until every person living in a 'fear society' has finally won their freedom."

== Usage ==
The test became famous after George W. Bush endorsed the book and Condoleezza Rice referenced it to characterize "a fear society" in her prepared remarks before the Senate Foreign Relations Committee on January 18, 2005:

The world should apply what Natan Sharansky calls the "town square test": if a person cannot walk into the middle of the town square and express his or her views without fear of arrest, imprisonment, or physical harm, then that person is living in a fear society, not a free society. We cannot rest until every person living in a "fear society" has finally won their freedom.

Rice went on to identify Belarus, Burma, Cuba, Iran, North Korea, and Zimbabwe as examples of outposts of tyranny.

=== The case of Luis Robles Elizástigui and the "Town Square Test" in Cuba ===
Luis Robles Elizástigui, referred to as "the Young Man with the Sign," is a Cuban citizen notable for his arrest and imprisonment following a peaceful protest in Havana on December 4, 2020. His case has been cited as an example of Natan Sharansky's "Town Square Test," which posits that a society is a "fear society" if individuals cannot express their opinions publicly without facing arrest or harm. Robles was detained after standing on San Rafael Boulevard holding a sign demanding freedom and the release of imprisoned artist Denis Solís. He was later sentenced to five years in prison.

Robles' case has garnered significant attention from human rights organizations and media. Amnesty International designated him a prisoner of conscience, stating that his imprisonment stemmed solely from peacefully exercising his right to freedom of expression. Human Rights Watch classified him as a political prisoner, and characterized his detention as politically motivated. Robles' family said he was subjected to "humiliating treatment" in prison.

== See also ==
- Democracy
- Political freedom
- Free speech zone
