= Anna Frangiosa =

American cabaret performer

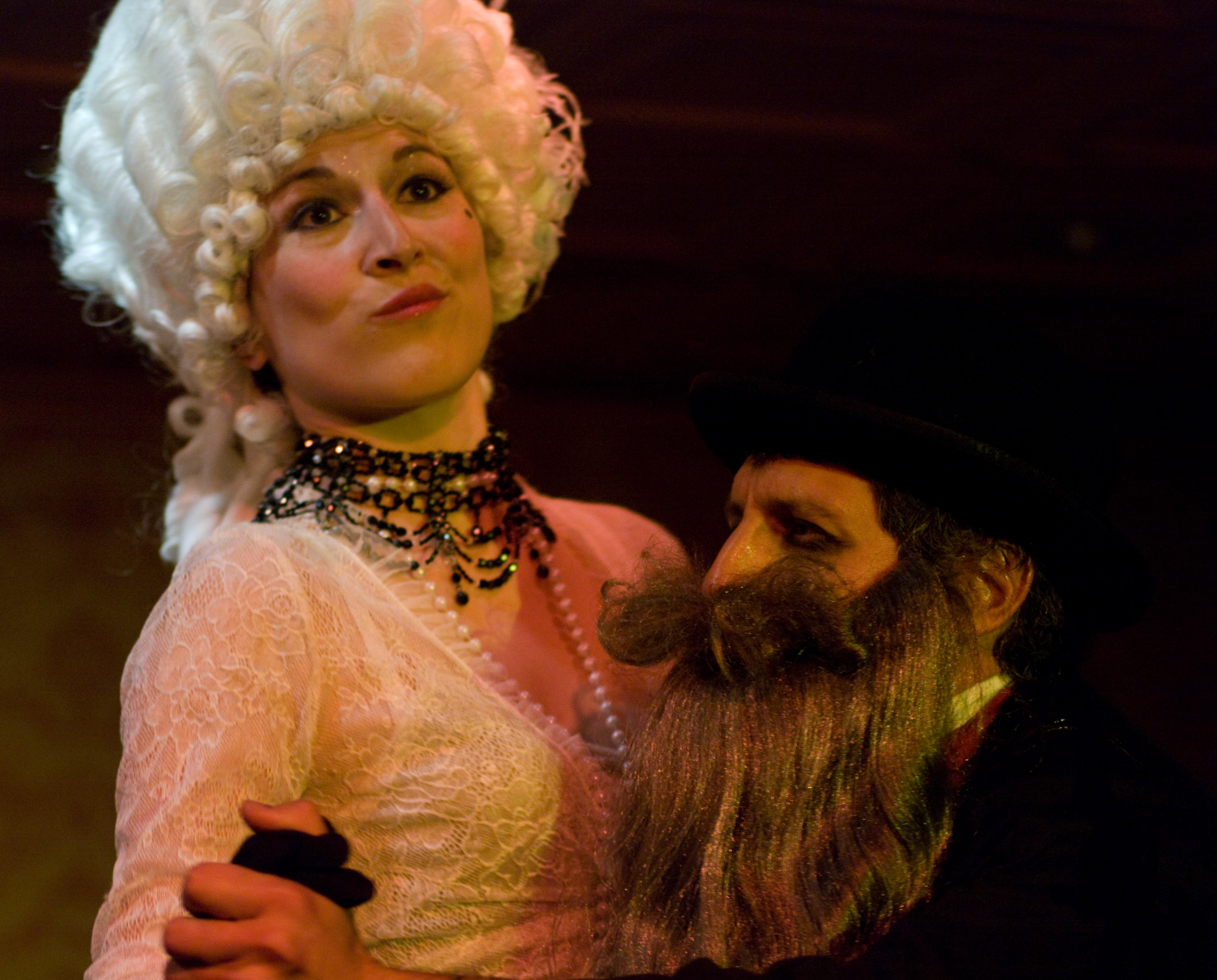
Annie A-Bomb and The Devil's Advocate of Cabaret Red Light 2009

Anna Frangiosa ("Annie A-Bomb") is a Philadelphia-based theater artist, costume designer, burlesque performer, director, instructor and model.

== Education and early life ==
Frangiosa went to Lower Merion High School and graduated in 1993. She then studied design at the Fashion Institute of Technology and anthropology at Temple University.

== Costume design work ==
Frangiosa has designed and built costumes primarily for new plays. Including for InterAct Theatre Company, B.Someday Productions, Brat Productions, Pig Iron Theatre Company, Lantern Theater Company, and many other theater and dance companies.

== Performance history ==
Frangiosa began her burlesque career with the Peek-A-Boo Revue and performed with them from 1998 to 2005. She founded the troupe Revival Burlesque in 2006. Revival is known for its sketch comedy mixed with sexy strip tease. Revival has been called "Saturday Night Live with boobs" in the Philadelphia City Paper.

Frangiosa was the co-director, with Peter Gaffney, of the agit-prop and politically charged Cabaret Red Light, a vaudeville, burlesque and puppet theater company. She was a writer, performer, puppeteer, director and designer for Cabaret Red Light from 2008 to 2011.

== The Cabaret Administration ==
In 2013 she founded The Cabaret Administration with their first production titled "F.T.L.F. or Free Think Love Frankenstein" a dance theater piece about Percy and Mary Shelley.

In 2014 the Cabaret Administration produced an original three part series of shows titled "Fin" and staged both a The Wonderful Wizard of Oz adaptation titled "Of Oz" and a The Nutcracker and the Mouse King adaptation titled "Nutcracker."

In 2015 The Cabaret Administration re-staged the "Fin" series as one longer production, also titled "Fin," and produced "Metropolis, a re-imagining of the 1927 Fritz Lang film of the same name. Both productions were staged at the Plays and Players Theatre in Philadelphia.

In 2017 The Cabaret Administration produced a two part re-imagining of The Last Unicorn, staging "Unicorn: The White Mare" and "Unicorn: The Red Bull" one month apart in March and April respectively. These halves were combined as one production in 2018.

== Modeling ==
Frangiosa is also a pin-up model. She has been painted by illustrators Boris Vallejo, Julie Bell, and was pictured in their 2008, 2009, and 2010 fantasy art wall calendars. She appeared in Heavy Metal Magazine via illustrations by David Palumbo. Anna was a model for Dr Sketchy's Anti-Art School Philadelphia chapter in 2008, and 2009.

== Other information and projects ==
Frangiosa founded the Philadelphia School of Burlesque in 2009.

She is known for her political involvement and often participates in demonstrations and direct actions including with Axis of Eve in 2004, and Occupy Philadelphia in 2011. In 2013 she marched from Philadelphia to Harrisburg with Decarcerate PA, a group focused on bringing attention to prison expansion in Pennsylvania.
