= Cabaret Red Light =

American theatre group based in Philadelphia

Coordinates: 39.95571°N 75.14403°W

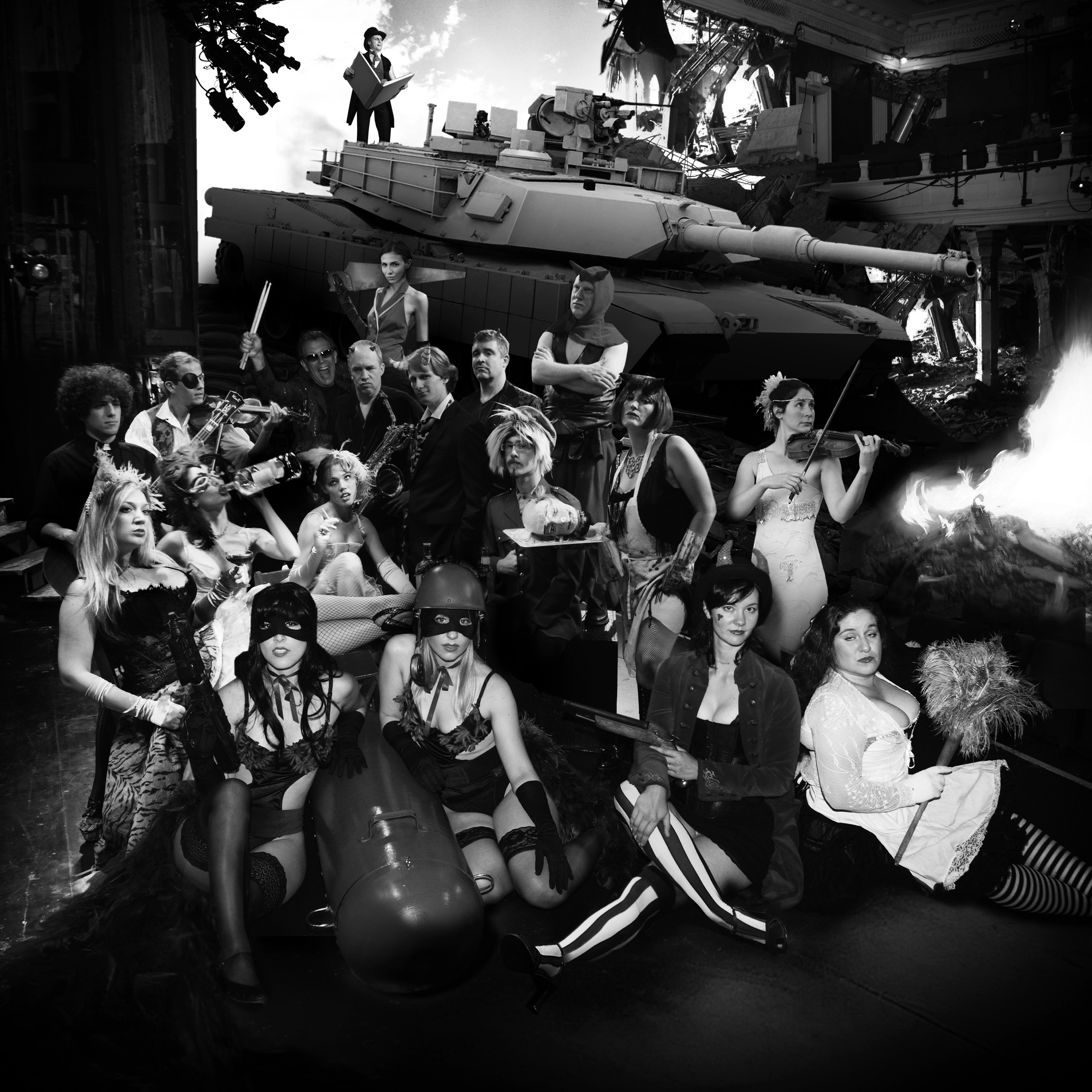
Cast of Cabaret Red Light in 2009

Cabaret Red Light was a theater group based in Philadelphia that performed vaudeville, burlesque, spoken word and puppet theater, set to original music by The Blazing Cherries. In their first season, between November 2008 and July 2009, Cabaret Red Light staged the series "The Seven Deadly Sins". Their second and third series ("The Experiment", about a cabaret that builds a time machine, and "The Seven Deadly Seas", a pirate and gypsy-jazz show aboard the barquentine Gazela) began in 2010, and they recently performed the premiere of their ballet-and-burlesque version of The Nutcracker based on E. T. A. Hoffmann's original Gothic short story "The Nutcracker and the Mouse King."

Cabaret Red Light's shows have been described as a blend of Agitprop and burlesque, an unlikely combination that earned them the title “The Best Marxist Girlie Show in Hell.” In their third show in the Seven Sins series, WRATH!, the group handed out pamphlets announcing the emergence worldwide of “pornographic socialism.” In the finale of their fifth show, GLUTTONY!, they immersed a showgirl (Annie A-Bomb) in liquid chocolate and invited members of the audience to lick it off. When Holly Otterbein of Philadelphia City Paper asked co-director Peter Gaffney about the politics of the show, he responded, "The common ways in which we entertain ourselves — TV, movies, the Internet — involve sitting in a room by yourself. Compare that to the licking scene. It's the opposite. It's real people in a room experimenting with themselves and testing out their own limits." In other interviews, however, Gaffney has denied that Cabaret Red Light has any overtly political agenda. "We think that theater has no business being in politics," he stated in an interview with Emily Orrson of The Daily Pennsylvanian, "and neither does the government."

== Cast members ==
Regular members of the Cabaret Red Light cast include co-directors Anna Frangiosa and Peter Gaffney, Annie A-Bomb, Chris Aschman, Jim Boyle, Mike Corso, Kimberlie Cruse, Jay Davidson, Christine Fisler, Melissa Forgione (a.k.a. Melissa Bang-Bang), Rolf Lakaemper, Andrew Morris, Shoshanna Hill, Angela Schleinkofer (a.k.a. Satangela) and Evan Smoker. Previous members, technical engineers and guest performers include Josh Anderson, Ryan Berg, Jess Conda, Andy Cowles, Alexandra Cutler-Fetkewicz, Nick Gilette, Biz Goldhammer, Toni Guinyard, Mike Harkness, Heather Henderson, Brian Hopely, Nicki Jaine, Julie-Françoise Kruidenier, Lindsay Ouellette, Gina Pickton, Kaveh Saidi, Timaree Schmit, Michael Schupp, Benjamin Shwartz (as The Ringer), Jeff Smith (a.k.a. Calvin the Jester), James Stapleford, Monsieur Thujone, Owen Timoney, Nick Troy, Koofreh Umoren, Marina Vishnyakova, Randi Warhol, and Kim Zelnicker (a.k.a. Svedka von Schotz).

== History ==
Peter Gaffney and Anna Frangiosa created Cabaret Red Light in 2008 in order to challenge the common perception that burlesque is not serious theater, and that politically engaged theater, on the other hand, is serious to a fault. Their influences include Anita Berber, NSK (the Neue Slowenische Kunst political art collective), Georges Brassens, Kurt Weill, Bulat Okudzawa, Bertolt Brecht, Aristophanes and Wilhelm Reich, as well as more contemporary artists and performance groups such as Julie Atlas Muz, Les Yeux Noirs, Frank Zappa, Bread and Puppet Theater, Tom Waits, the Yes Men and The Yard Dogs Road Show.

In November 2008, they performed their first show, "Vanity" as part of " The Seven Deadly Sins" series at L'Etage Cabaret in Philadelphia. Beginning in November 2009, Plays and Players Theatre began presenting Cabaret Red Light's shows derived from their cabaret material. These shows were called "The Takeover", "The Occupation", and "Lust". These elaborately staged productions have included such things as an army of showgirls armed with feathers and weapon props, and a 20-foot octopus puppet.

In the summers of 2010 and 2011 the company produced four shows in the series, "The Seven Deadly Seas". The shows were about pirates as corporate/capitalist figures and featured swordplay and burlesque. They premiered on the Gazela, a historic three masted tall ship. Shows were performed in Philadelphia, New York, and Baltimore.

Their original production of Nutcracker premiered in December 2010 at Painted Bride Art Center in Philadelphia. The show featured an original adaptation of the original E. T. A. Hoffmann story by Peter Gaffney and Anna Frangiosa. Music by Rolf Lakamper. Choreography by Christine Fisler. The adaptation was for adults and featured ballet, shadow puppetry, burlesque, and a seven piece orchestra. The production was re-mounted in December 2011 and sold out all performances.

In October 2011, Cabaret Red Light produced an original musical play inspired by Mae West titled, "Looking Pretty and Saying Cute Things". Written by Anna Frangiosa and Peter Gaffney. Music direction by Chris Ashman. Inspired by Mae West's early brushes with the law over obscenity, her imprisonment for eight days after an "obscenity conviction", and her censuring by the Hays Code.

Cabaret Red Light produced no shows in 2012. The company's website had not been updated since 2011.

== See also ==
- Anna Frangiosa
- The Cabaret Administration
- Jubilee!
- Peepshow
- Sirens of TI
- Absinthe
- Moulin Rouge
- Le Lido
- Folies Bergère
- Casino de Paris
- Paradis Latin
- Tropicana Club
