= Russians in Israel =

Russian citizens and nationals in Israel

Total population
- Approximately 1,300,000 Russian-speakers

Regions with significant populations
- Jerusalem, Tel Aviv, Haifa, Ashkelon, Ashdod, Bat Yam and many other places

Languages
- Russian, Hebrew, Neo-Aramaic, Russian Sign Language, Shassi

Religion
- Judaism, Russian Orthodox Church, non-religious, Secular Judaism

Related ethnic groups
- Russians, Russian Jews, Ashkenazi Jews

Russians in Israel or Russian Israelis are post-Soviet Russian citizens who immigrated to Israel and their descendants. As of 2022, Russian-speakers number around 1,300,000 people, or 15% of the Israeli population. This number, however, also includes immigrants from the Soviet Union and post-Soviet states other than Russia proper.

Some of the immigrants are not considered Jewish according to the Halacha, which defines a Jew if their mother is Jewish or they formally converted to Judaism. This makes it difficult for many of those Russian Israelis who are not recognised as Jewish by the chief rabbinate to get married or buried in Israel. According to the Law of Return, anybody with at least one Jewish grandparent is eligible to become an Israeli citizen. Because of the Soviet Union's policy of state atheism and Russia's historically large Jewish population, there were some mixed marriages between Russian Jews and ethnic Russians during the Communist period. Some Russian Israelis have Israeli citizenship by marriage, as the Law of Return also allows the non-Jewish spouses of Jews to claim Israeli citizenship. A few Russian Israelis are instead descended from Russian Subbotnik families, who have migrated to Israel over the past century.

Most Russians in Israel have full Israeli citizenship. Israeli Russians are involved in the country's economy on all levels and have made invaluable contributions to Israeli society, particularly in the cultural, scientific, high-tech, medical, and education fields. One in four staff members at Israel's universities now are native Russian speakers. Many Russian Israelis choose to preserve their language and culture. There are Russian language newspapers, television stations, schools, and social media outlets based in Israel such as Channel 9, Pervoe radio, Vesti and others. Many Russian Israelis also celebrate Russian holidays like Novy God and Victory Day.

== History ==
The 1922 census of Palestine lists 877 Russian language speakers in Mandatory Palestine (10 in the Southern District, 772 in Jerusalem-Jaffa, 4 in Samaria, and 91 in the Northern District), including 571 in municipal areas (407 in Jerusalem, 63 in Jaffa, 74 in Haifa, 2 in Gaza, 1 in Nablus, 2 in Nazareth, 4 in Tiberias, 2 in Bethlehem, 2 in Tulkarem, 8 in Beit Jala, 5 in Beersheba, and 1 in Baisan).

In the aftermath of the Six-Day War in 1967, the Soviet Union broke off diplomatic relations with Israel and began an anti-Zionist campaign. This campaign made many Soviet Jews feel that there was no place for them in the USSR. As a result, many of them applied for emigration visas to leave the Soviet Union. However, in most cases, the government denied their visa requests. In many cases, those "Refuseniks" were fired from their jobs by the government shortly after being refused exit visas from the Soviet Union. They had to accept any job offered to them, even if it was well below their expertise level, to avoid being arrested on charges of social parasitism.

In 1970, a group of Refuseniks attempted to hijack a plane and fly it to Israel in what became known as the Dymshits–Kuznetsov hijacking affair. Their attempt failed, and they were subsequently charged with high treason, with some of them receiving death sentences. After the affair, international pressure caused the Soviet authorities to significantly increase the emigration quota, thus starting the 1970s Soviet Union aliyah, in which more than 150,000 Soviet Jews immigrated to Israel.

In 1989, Soviet General Secretary Mikhail Gorbachev decided to lift restrictions on emigration. As a result of this decision, almost a million post-Soviet Jews immigrated from across the former Soviet Union to Israel between the years of 1989 and 2006 in what is known as the 1990s post-Soviet aliyah.

== Communities ==
=== Subbotniks ===
Russian Subbotnik families settled in Ottoman Syria in the 1880s as part of the First Aliyah in order to escape oppression in the Russian Empire and later mostly intermarried with local Jews. Their descendants included Israeli Jews such as Alexander Zaïd, Rafael Eitan, Ariel Sharon and Major-General Alik Ron.

In 2004, the Sephardic Chief Rabbi of Israel Shlomo Amar ruled the Subbotniks were not defined as Jewish and would have to undergo an Orthodox conversion. The Interior Ministry classified the Subbotniks as a Christian sect and ineligible for aliyah to Israel, because no one knew if their ancestors had formally converted to Judaism (and there is much historic evidence that they did not). However, this ruling was abolished in 2014, with Subbotniks allowed to retain their Jewish status in Israel, with an attempt by the Interior Ministry to allow remaining Subbotnik families to immigrate to Israel.

== Society ==
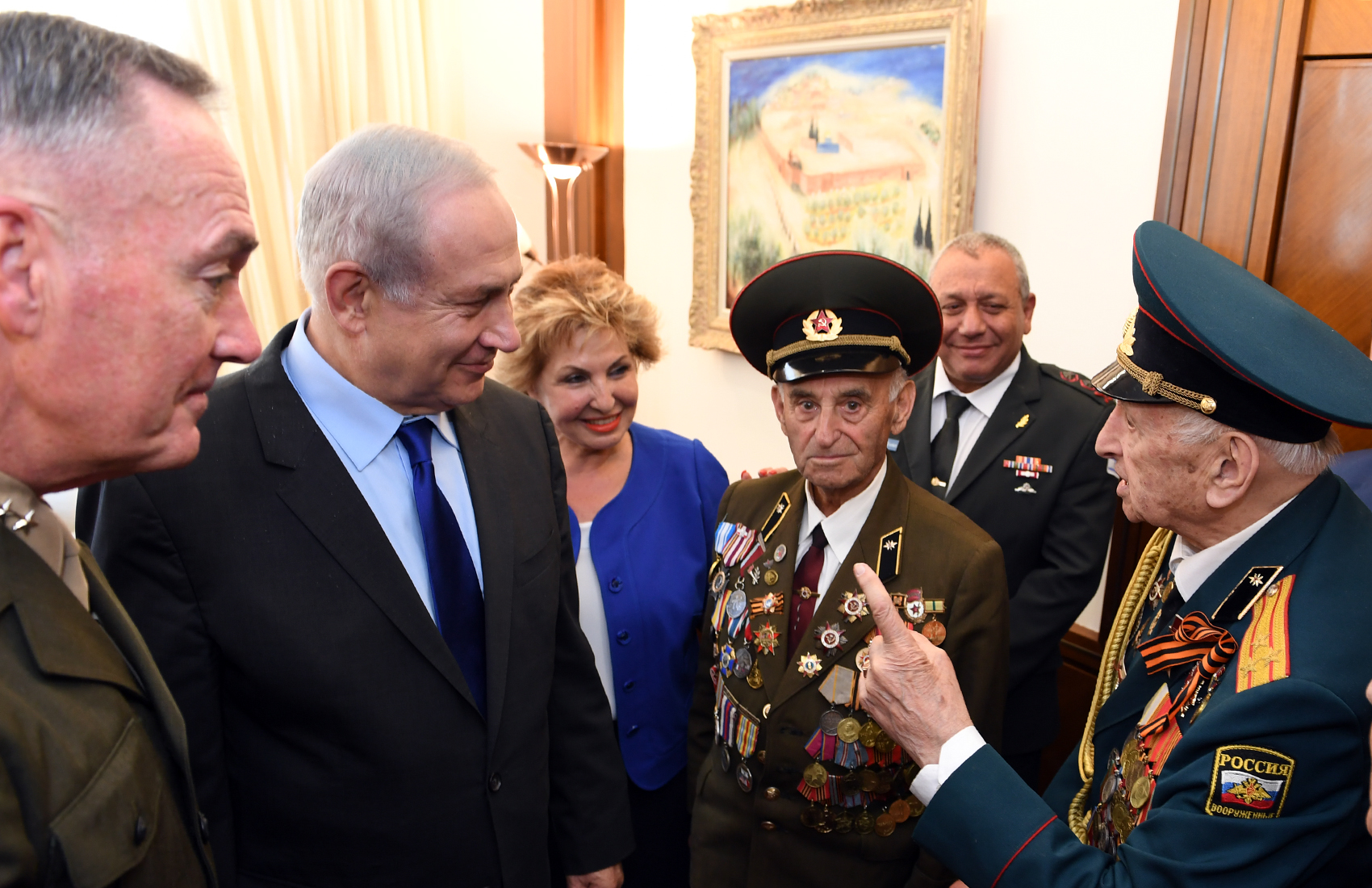
General Joseph F. Dunford and Israeli Prime Minister Benjamin Netanyahu meeting with Israeli-Russian Red Army veterans in Jerusalem.

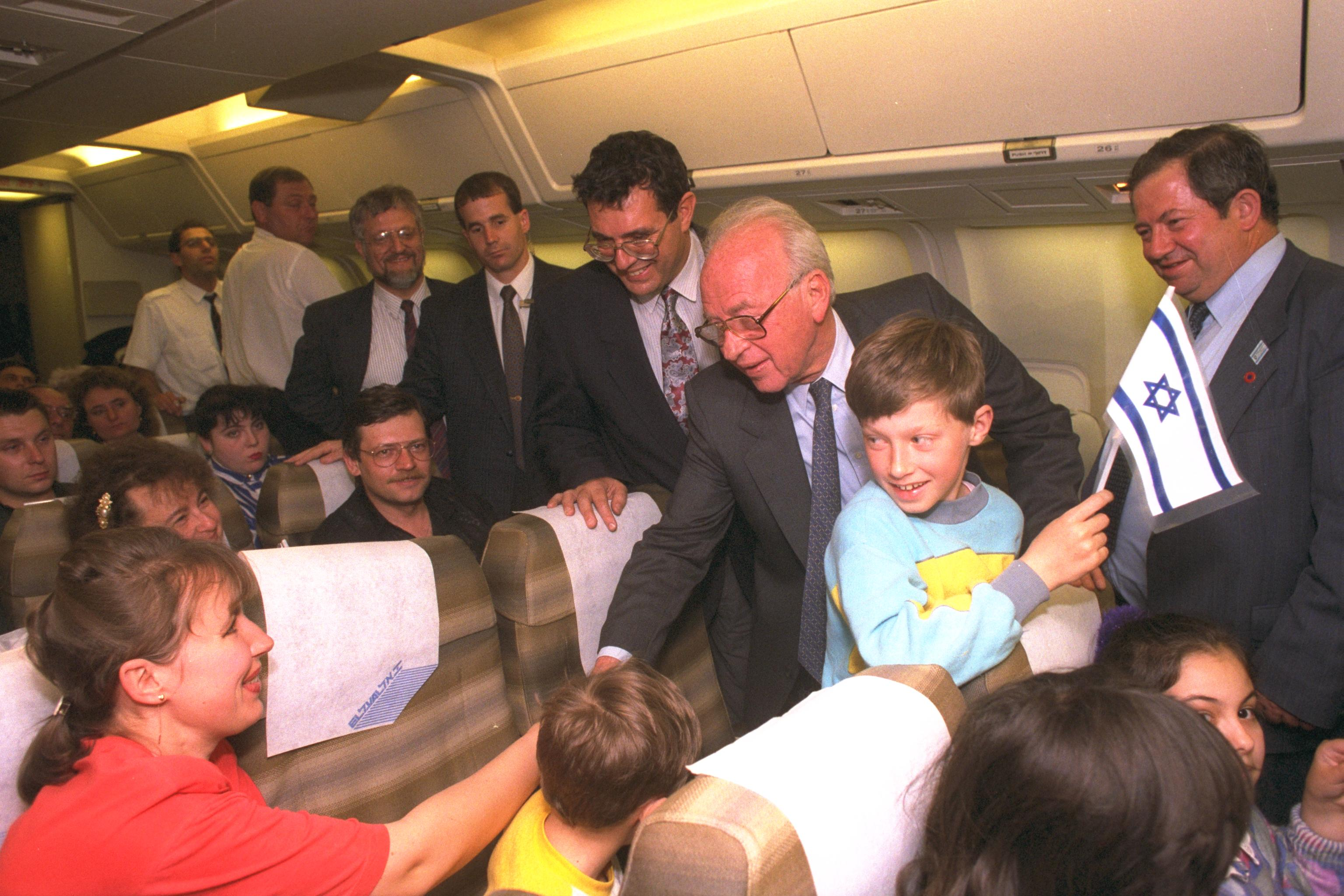
Prime Minister Yitzhak Rabin shakes hands with new Russian immigrants on their flight from Russia to Israel. 27 April 1994.

The Russian people within Israel have citizen status and are involved in the country's economy and society on all levels. Among the notable members of the community are social media star Anna Zak; actress and former MK Anastassia Michaeli; Footballer Alexander Uvarov who was naturalized in 2004; Actor Kirill Safonov; poet and composer Yuliy Kim, and many others.

== Religion ==
Most Russian Israelis are atheists or otherwise non-religious, although anywhere from 56,000 to 100,000 belong to the Russian Orthodox Church. It is estimated that another 10,000 are practitioners of Messianic Judaism, a form of evangelical Protestant Christianity incorporating elements of Jewish tradition. About 100,000 Russian Israelis have also undergone conversion to Orthodox Judaism, most of them through the Nativ program. However, there are approximately 400,000 Russian Israelis with full citizenship who have not converted.

== See also ==
- 1990s post-Soviet aliyah
- 1970s Soviet Union aliyah
- Refusenik
- Israel–Russia relations
- Russian Jews in Israel
- Russian language in Israel
- Church of Mary Magdalene
- Russian Compound
- History of the Jews in Russia
- History of the Jews in the Soviet Union
- Demographics of the Soviet Union
- Nativ (conversion)
- Channel 9 (Israel)
- Patrol 36
- Anglo-Israelis
