= 1979 Soviet census =

Census in the Soviet Union

1979 All-Union Population census
- 17 January 1979

General information
- Country: Soviet Union

Results
- Total population: 262,442,000 (▲8.4%)
- Most populous republic: Russian SFSR; 137,397,089
- Least populous republic: Estonian SSR; 1,464,476

In January 1979, the Soviet Union conducted its first census in nine years (since 1970). Between 1970 and 1979, the total Soviet population increased from 241,720,134 to 262,084,654, an increase of 8.4%.

== Summary ==
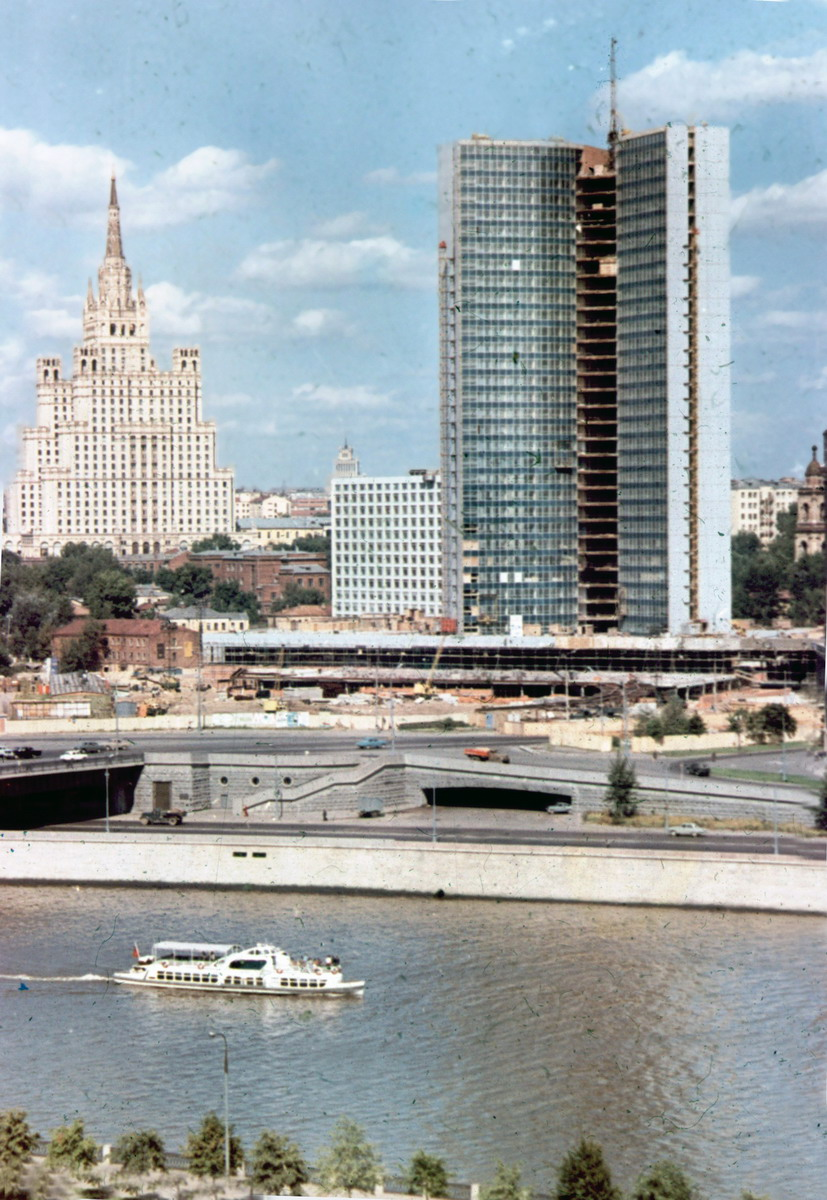
Moscow in 1970. The Soviet Union experienced increased urbanization between 1970 and 1979.

As in 1970, Russians, Ukrainians, Uzbeks, and Belarusians were the largest ethnic groups in the Soviet Union in 1979. Specifically, there were 137,397,089 Russians, 42,347,387 Ukrainians, 12,455,978 Uzbeks, and 9,462,715 Belarusians living in the Soviet Union in 1979. Meanwhile, the largest SSRs in the Soviet Union by population in 1979 were the Russian SFSR (with 137.6 million inhabitants), the Ukrainian SSR (with 49.8 million inhabitants), the Uzbek SSR (with 15.4 million inhabitants), the Russian-plurality Kazakh SSR (with 14.7 million inhabitants), and the Byelorussian SSR (with 9.6 million inhabitants).

The Tajik SSR, Uzbek SSR, and Turkmen SSRs were the fastest-growing SSRs between 1970 and 1979. During this time, the Tajik SSR grew by 31% while the Uzbek SSR grew by 30% and the Turkmen SSR grew by 28%. Overall, other parts of the Caucasus and Central Asia also experienced large growth between 1970 and 1979 while the slowest-growing SSRs during this time were the Russian SFSR, the Ukrainian SSR, and the Byelorussian SSR (all of which only grew by 6% between 1970 and 1979).

Between 1970 and 1979, the Soviet Union become more urban, with 62% of its total residents living in urban areas in 1979 in comparison to 56% in 1970. Indeed, there were 18 cities in the Soviet Union with over one million residents in 1979 (in comparison to 10 such cities in 1970). In addition to this, the male to female ratio also increased between 1970 and 1979. Indeed, while males only made up 46.1% of the Soviet Union's total population in 1970, this figure increased to 46.7% by 1979. Overall, between 1970 and 1979, the total Soviet population increased from 241,720,134 to 262,084,654, an increase of 8.42%.

Between 1970 and 1979, the Soviet Jewish population fell by over 300,000, decreasing from 2,167,000 in 1970 to 1,833,000 in 1979. This fall was caused at least in part by the 1970s Soviet Union aliyah. Meanwhile, the ethnic German population in the Soviet Union increased from 1,846,317 in 1970 to 1,936,214 in 1979.

=== Ukrainian SSR ===
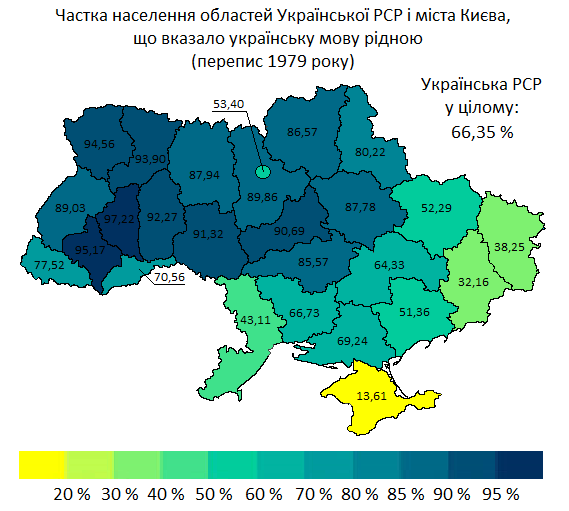
Percentage of the population of the oblasts of the Ukrainian SSR and the city of Kyiv who indicated Ukrainian as their native language.

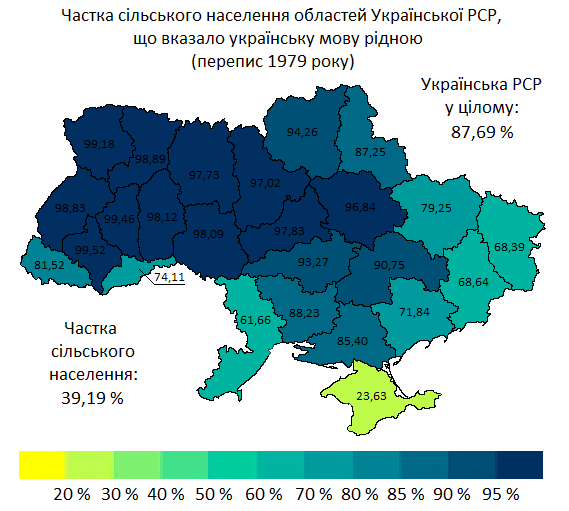
Percentage of the rural population of the oblasts of the Ukrainian SSR who indicated Ukrainian as their native language.

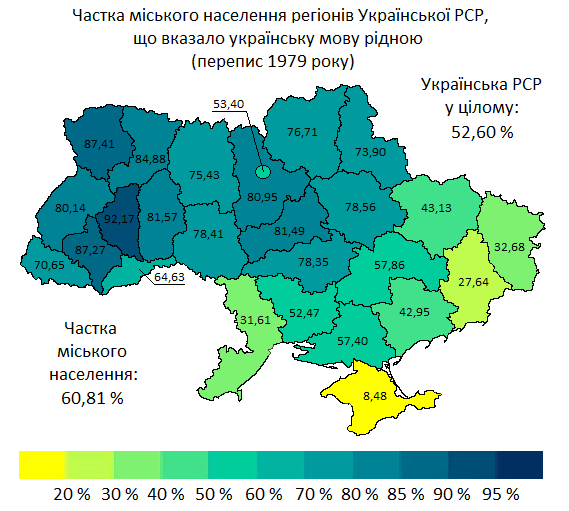
Percentage of the urban population of the regions of the Ukrainian SSR who indicated Ukrainian as their native language.

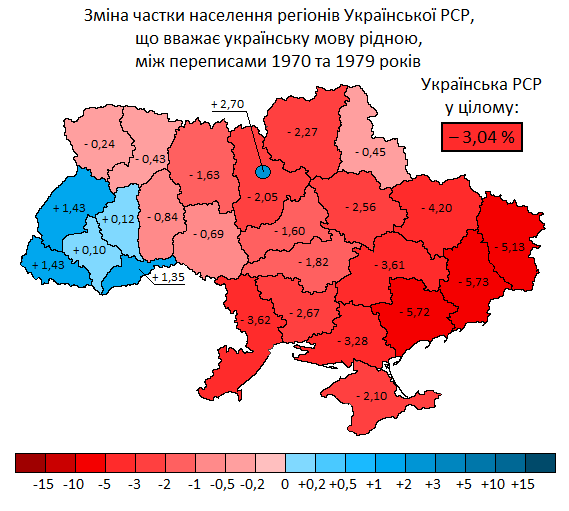
Change in the proportion of the population of the regions of the Ukrainian SSR who consider Ukrainian their native language between the 1970 and 1979 censuses.
