= Nativ (conversion) =

Nativ Logo

Nativ – the National Center for Identity and Conversion (Hebrew: נתיב - המרכז הלאומי לזהות וגיור) is a program of the Jewish Agency that helps Israel Defense Forces soldiers convert to Judaism.

== History ==
During the 1990s post-Soviet aliyah, about a million immigrants came to Israel from the former Soviet Union. About one third, or 300,000, had Jewish family members but were not recognized as Jews under Jewish law. The process of conversion to Judaism in Israel is overseen by the Orthodox Chief Rabbinate, which requires strict adherence to Jewish law by prospective converts, while most Jewish Israelis are not observant. The Nativ program's first course was inaugurated in 2001 to deal with this problem. It is the only recognized conversion option that is not run by the Chief Rabbinate; instead, it is run by rabbis in the Military Rabbinate.

According to a 2019 survey, 71% of Israelis approve of the program, while 52% want to make conversion easier. Despite its popularity, the program has suffered repeated budget crises because the government has not allocated money for it. By 2019, more than 10,000 soldiers had converted via the program.
