= History of the Jews in South Ossetia =

South Ossetian Jews
- Location of South Ossetia in Asia

Total population
- South Ossetia: 1 (2013)

Regions with significant populations
- Tskhinvali

Languages
- Georgian • Hebrew • Russian

Religion
- Judaism

Related ethnic groups
- Jews (Abkhaz Jews, Georgian Jews)

The history of the Jews in South Ossetia is connected to the history of the Jews in Georgia. Much of the early Jewish history in South Ossetia is similar to that of other Jewish communities in the Georgian region. At the same time, the South Ossetian capital, Tskhinvali was known for its sizable Georgian Jewish population, where the community had its own quarter.

== Connection with Georgian Jews ==
The history of the Jews in Georgia is over 2,500 years old. Georgian Jews (Georgian: ქართველი ებრაელები, romanized: kartveli ebraelebi) are one of the oldest communities in Georgia, tracing their migration into the country during the Babylonian captivity in 6th century BC. The 2,600-year history of the Georgian Jews was marked by an almost total absence of antisemitism and a visible assimilation in the Georgian language and culture. The Georgian Jews were considered ethnically and culturally distinct from neighboring Mountain Jews. They were also traditionally a highly separate group from the Ashkenazi Jews in Georgia, who arrived following the Russian annexation of Georgia.

== Modern history ==
In 1891, an Ashkenazi rabbi Avraham Khvolis moved to Tskhinvali from Lithuania. In Tskhinvali, Khvolis founded a school and synagogue, and he taught European rabbinical thought to Georgian Jews. Today, the synagogue Khvolis founded sits abandoned on a desolate street with what appears to be a hole from an artillery shell in its facade. On Sundays, Baptist services are held there.

According to the Soviet censuses of 1926 and 1939 there were about 2000 Jews in South Ossetia, all but a few in Tskhinvali. As late as 1926 almost a third of the town's inhabitants were Jews. Their number declined later as they moved to bigger cities of Soviet Union or emigrated to Israel or other countries.

Most of the Jewish population fled South Ossetia for Israel and Georgia proper during the First Ossetian War in 1991. The remainder fled in advance of the 2008 war. As of September 2018, only one Jew remained in South Ossetia, a single elderly woman living in Tskhinvali called Rebecca Jinjikhashvili, known to locals as 'Rybka', her childhood name.

== See also ==
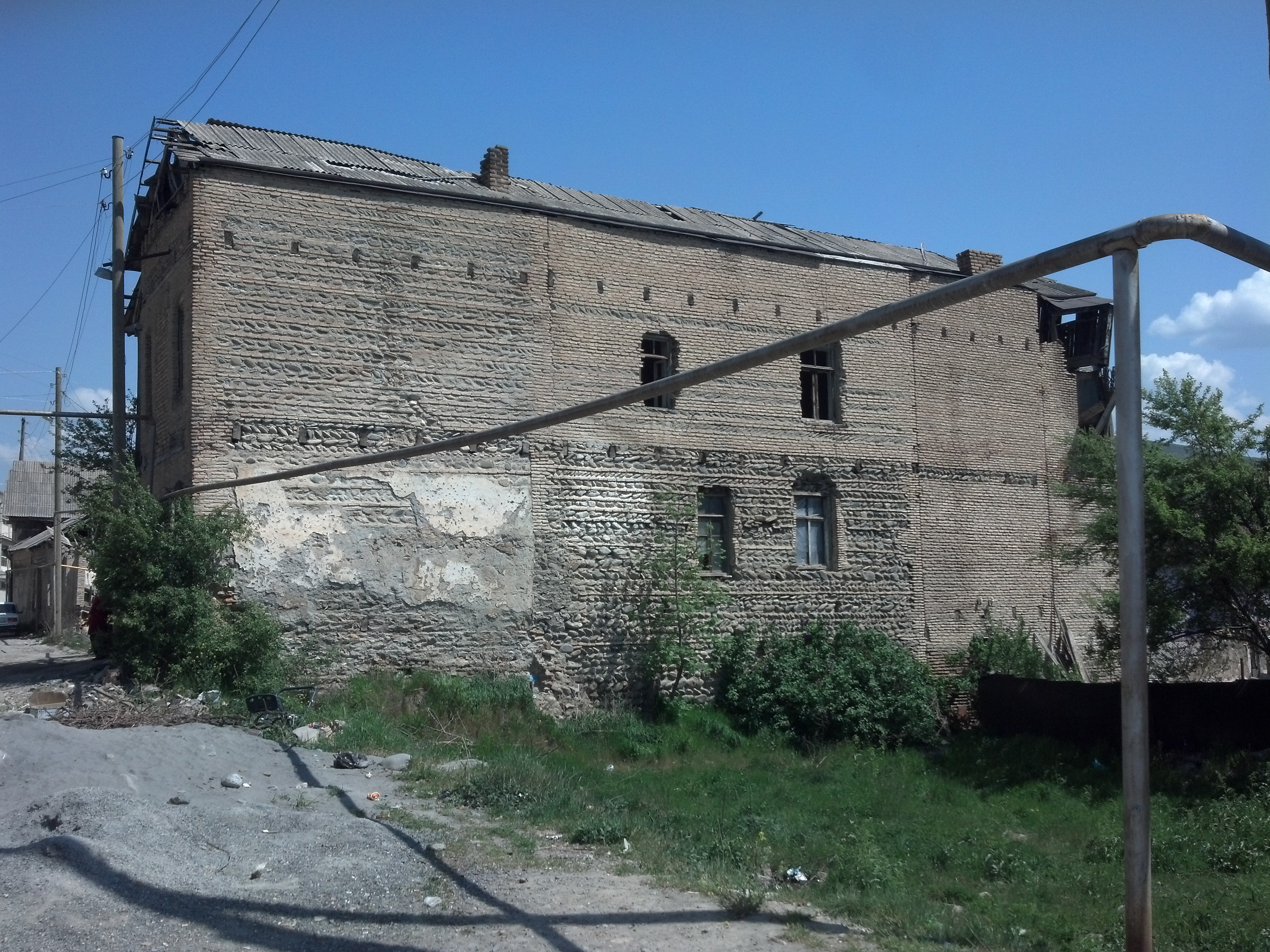
A building in former Jewish quarter of Tskhinvali

- History of the Jews in Georgia
- History of the Jews in Abkhazia
