= History of the Jews in Abkhazia =

Abkhaz Jews
- Location of Abkhazia in Asia

Total population
- Abkhazia: <150 (2013)

Regions with significant populations
- Sukhumi

Languages
- Hebrew, Abkhaz, Russian, Georgian

Religion
- Judaism

Related ethnic groups
- Jews (Ossetian Jews, Georgian Jews)

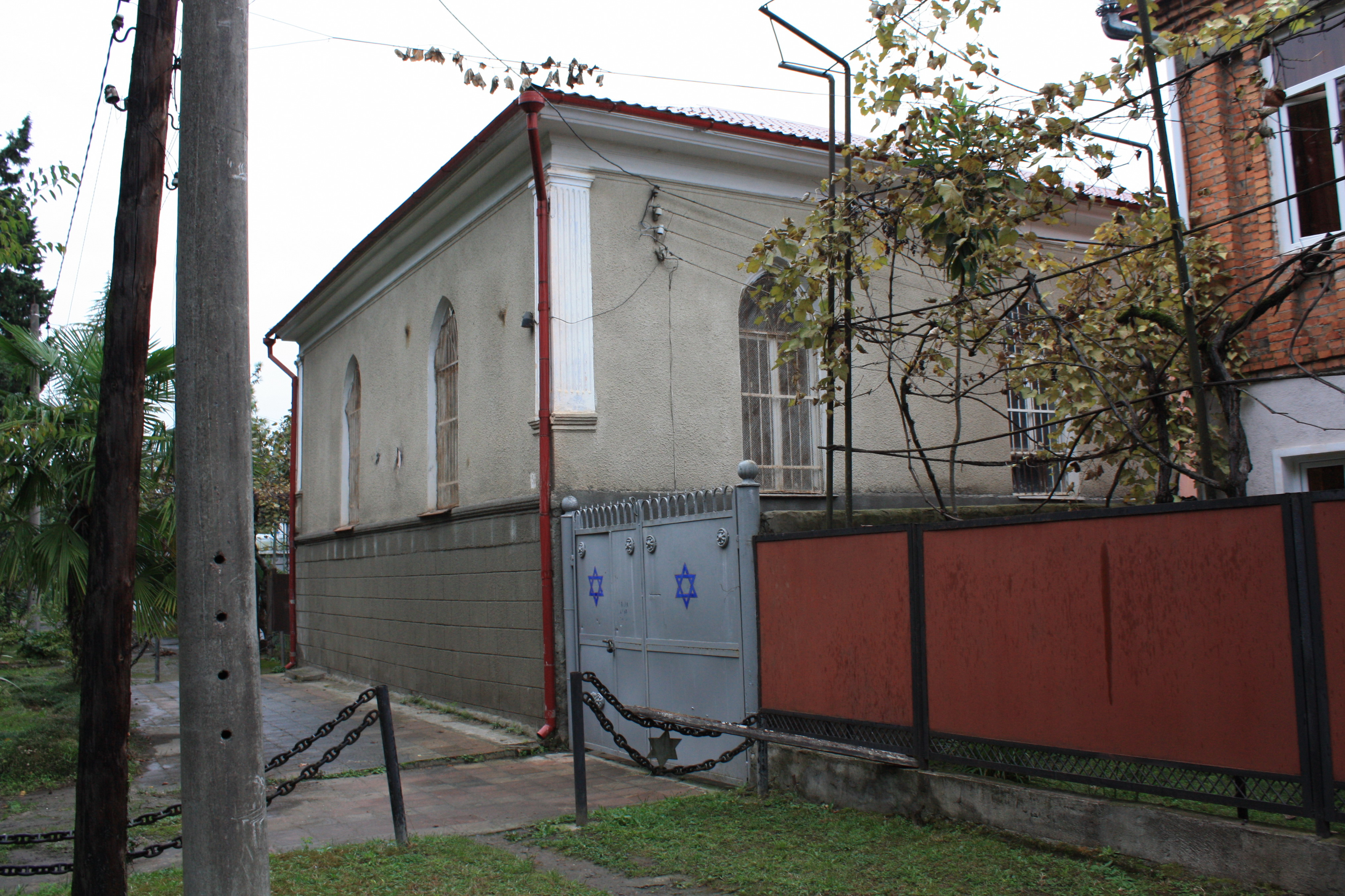
Synagogue in Sukhumi.

Number of Jews in Sukhumi
Year	Total	Georgian Jews
1897	134
1915	356	80
1922	1,012
1926	916	201
1939	1,545
1959	≈3,000	≈2,000
1970	3,618
1979	1,640
1989	1,308
2009	150

The history of the Jews in Abkhazia dates back to the early 19th century. The Jewish population of Abkhazia consisted of Ashkenazi, Georgian and other Jews. It grew after the incorporation of Abkhazia into the Russian Empire in the middle of the 19th century. Most of the Jews left or were evacuated from Abkhazia as a result of the Georgian-Abkhazian conflict of 1992–1993.

== Medieval period ==
There was a Jewish community in Savastopoli (Sukhumi) in the 13th century and some Jewish merchants were active in the southern Black Sea area.

== Modern history ==
A Russian garrison was installed in Sukhumi in the 1840s, as its fortress was part of the Black Sea defence line, and Jews from many regions of Georgia, particularly from Kulashi, settled in the town. As the 1897 census results indicate, there were also many Ashkenazi Jews in Sukhumi. A synagogue was built in the first decade of the 20th century.

In Soviet times, the Jewish population of Abkhazia increased greatly, but the Sukhumi Jewish community remained the largest in Abkhazia. According to the 1926 census, there were about 1,100 Jews in Abkhazia, most of them Ashkenazi (702) or Georgian (215). The Jewish community of Sukhumi was officially recognised by Soviet authorities in 1945, at the very end of World War II. Abkhazian Jews suffered like the other Jews of the Soviet Union during the massive anti-Jewish campaign in the late 1940s and early 1950s. Sukhumi synagogue was razed in October, 1951 (according to the official version, its territory was needed for urban development). The Jewish population increased to about 3,500 in 1959, but many of them emigrated to Israel and elsewhere in the 1970s.

As the Soviet Union was disintegrating in the late 1980s, ethnic tensions began to grow in Abkhazia and the number of Jewish emigrants increased greatly. There were still many Jews in Abkhazia at the outbreak of the Georgian-Abkhaz War in August, 1992. All of the Jews who wished to flee the fledgling republic were evacuated by the Jewish Agency and settled in Israel. Most of the few who remained were Ashkenazi. Those who remained had to endure the capture of Sukhumi by Abkhaz separatists and their allies.

As of 2009, there are about 150 Jews in Abkhazia, nearly all of them Ashkenazi. The community maintains a synagogue in Sukhumi. The majority of them are elderly, with their average age being 72 in 2004.

Rivka Cohen, Israel's ambassador to Georgia, visited Abkhazia in July, 2004.

== See also ==
- Georgian Jews
- Religion in Abkhazia
