= History of the Jews in the Soviet Union =

Location of the Soviet Union (dark green) in 1989.

The history of the Jews in the Soviet Union is inextricably linked to much earlier expansionist policies of the Russian Empire conquering and ruling the eastern half of the European continent already before the Bolshevik Revolution of 1917. "For two centuries – wrote Zvi Gitelman – millions of Jews had lived under one entity, the Russian Empire and its successor state the USSR. They had now come under the jurisdiction of fifteen states, some of which had never existed and others that had passed out of existence in 1939." Before the revolutions of 1989 which resulted in the end of communist rule in Central and Eastern Europe, a number of these now sovereign countries constituted the component republics of the Soviet Union.

== Armenia ==
The history of the Jews in Armenia dates back more than 2,000 years. After Eastern Armenia came under Russian rule in the early 19th century, Jews began arriving from Poland and Iran, creating Ashkenazic and Mizrahi communities in Yerevan. More Jews moved to Armenia during its period as a Soviet republic finding more tolerance in the area than in Russia or Ukraine. After World War II, the Jewish population rose to approximately 5,000. However, with the dissolution of the Soviet Union, many left due to inadequate services and today the country's Jewish population has shrunk to 750. Despite small numbers, a high intermarriage rate, and relative isolation, a great deal of enthusiasm exists to help the community meet its needs. There are about 100 Jews presently living in Armenia, mainly in the capital Yerevan. They are mostly of Ashkenazi origin and some are Mizrahi Georgian Jews.

== Azerbaijan ==
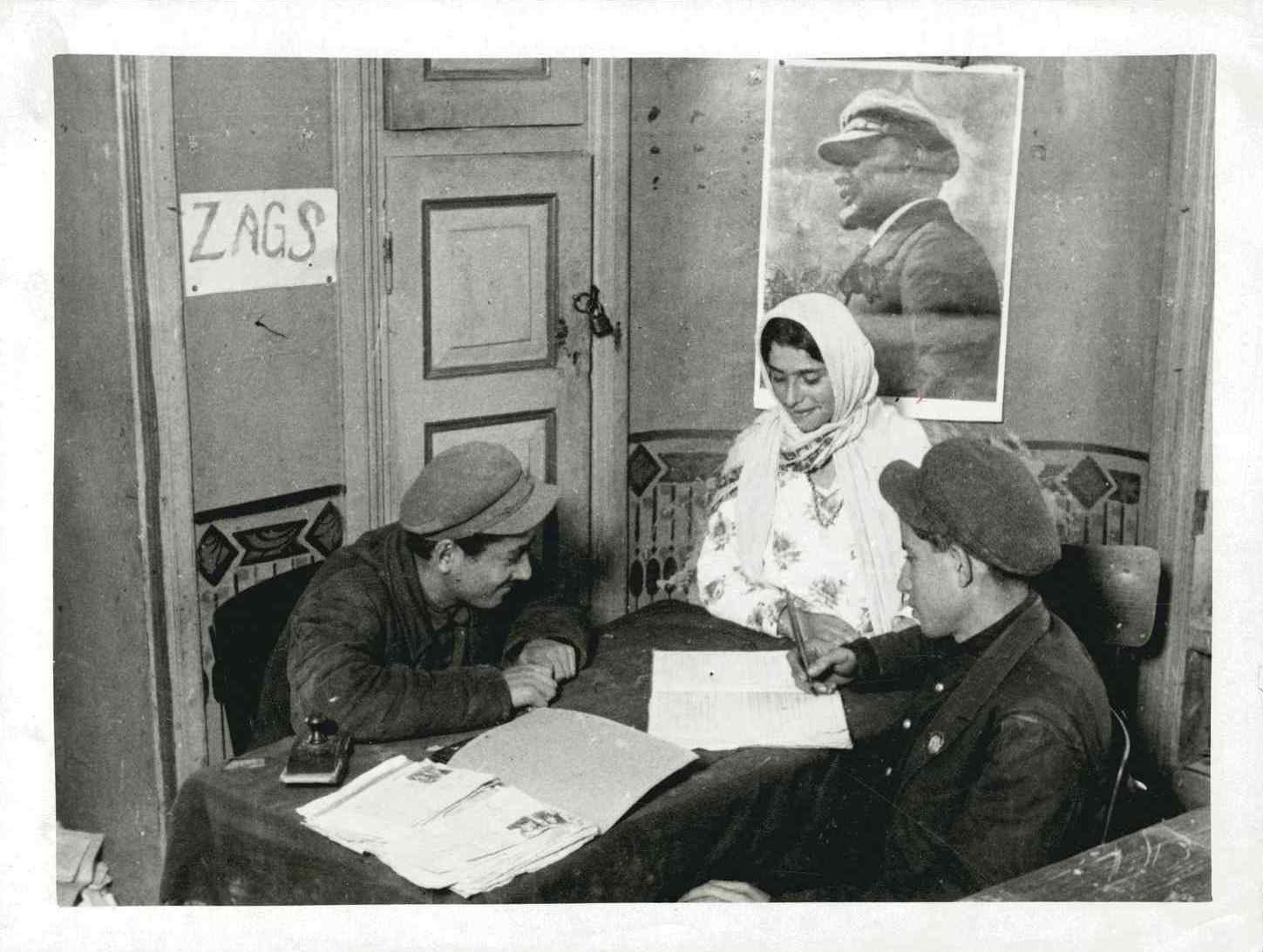
Mountain Jews in Quba rayon, Azerbaijan 1932

The History of the Jews in Azerbaijan (Judeo-Tat: çuhuro / жугьуро / ז'אוּהאוּרו; Yiddish: אַזערבייַדזאַניש יִידן; Azerbaijani: cuhudlar, yəhudilər; Russian: Азербайджанские евреи) dates back to Late Antiquity. Historically Jews in Azerbaijan have been represented by various subgroups, mainly Mountain Jews, Ashkenazi Jews and Georgian Jews. After Sovietization all Zionism-related activities including those of cultural nature that were carried out in Hebrew were banned. In the early 1920s, a few hundred Mountain Jewish families from Azerbaijan and Dagestan left for Palestine and settled in Tel Aviv. The next aliyah did not take place until the 1970s, after the ban on Jewish immigration to Israel was lifted (see Refusenik). Between 1972 and 1978 around 3,000 people left Azerbaijan for Israel. 1970 was the demographic peak for Azerbaijani Jews after World War II; according to the census, 41,288 Jews resided in Azerbaijan that year.

Many Jewish émigrés from Azerbaijan settled in Tel-Aviv and Haifa. There are relatively large communities of Mountain Jewish expatriates from Azerbaijan in New York City and Toronto. Similar to many immigrant communities of the Czarist and Soviet eras in Azerbaijan, Ashkenazi Jews appear to be linguistically Russified. The majority of Ashkenazi Jews speak Russian as their first language with Azeri sometimes being spoken as the second. The number of Yiddish-speakers is unknown.

== Belarus ==
By the end of the 19th century, many Belarusian Jews were part of the general flight of Jews from Eastern Europe to the New World due to conflicts and pogroms engulfing the Russian Empire and the antisemitism of the Russian czars. Millions of Jews, including tens of thousands of Jews from Belarus, emigrated to the United States of America and South Africa. A small number also emigrated to the British Mandate of Palestine. During the first years of Soviet rule in Belarus, Jews were able to get powerful positions in the country's government and intelligentisa.

In WWII, atrocities against the intelligentsia in the German-conquered areas began almost immediately, with the dispatch of Einsatzgruppen (task groups).

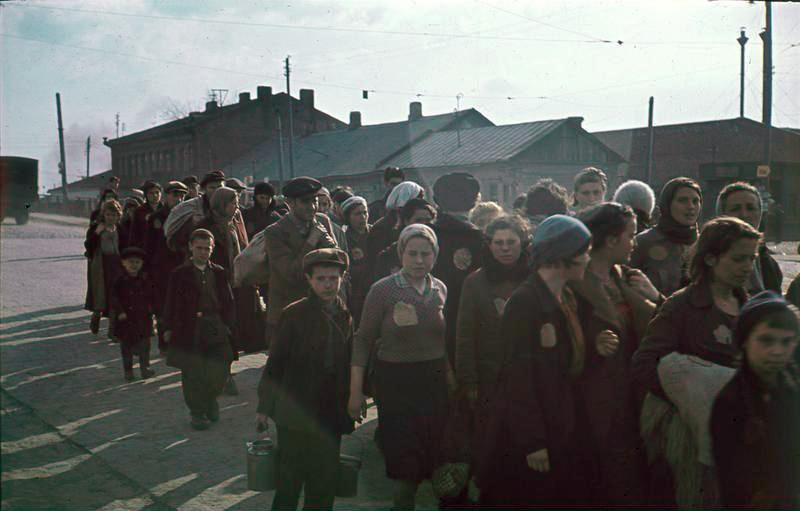
Jews in Minsk, German–occupied Belarus, 1941

The Jews in Belarus, then known as Byelorussian SSR were the third largest ethnic group in the country in the first half of the 20th century. Before World War II, Jews were the third among the ethnic groups in Belarus and comprised more than 40% of the population in cities and towns. The population of cities such as Minsk, Pinsk, Mahiliou, Babrujsk, Viciebsk, and Homiel was more than 50% Jewish. In 1897 there were 724,548 Jews in Belarus, or 13.6% of the total population. Some 800,000 Jews—90% of the Jewish population—were killed in Belarus during the Holocaust. According to the 2009 census, there were 12,926 Jews in Belarus (0.1% of the population). The Jewish Agency estimates the community of Jews in Belarus at 70,000. Marc Chagall, Mendele Mocher Sforim, Chaim Weizmann and Menachem Begin were born in Belarus.

In the second half of the 20th century, there was a large wave of Belarusian Jews immigrating to Israel (see Aliyah from the Soviet Union in the 1970s), as well as to the United States. In 1979, there were 135,400 Jews in Belarus; a decade later, 112,000 were left. The collapse of the Soviet Union and Belarusian independence saw most of the community, along with the majority of the former Soviet Union's Jewish population, leave for Israel (see Russian immigration to Israel in the 1990s). The 1999 census estimated that there were only 29,000 Jews left in the country. However, local Jewish organizations put the number at 50,000, and the Jewish Agency believes that there are 70,000. About half of the country's Jews live in Minsk. Despite general antisemitism, national Jewish organizations, local cultural groups, religious schools, charitable organizations, and organizations for war veterans and Holocaust survivors have been formed. Since the mass immigration of the 1990s, there has been some continuous immigration to Israel. In 2002, 974 Belarusians moved to Israel, and between 2003 and 2005, 4,854 followed suit.

== Estonia ==
The history of the Jews in Estonian SSR starts with individual reports of Jews in what is now Estonia from as early as the 14th century. However, the process of permanent Jewish settlement in Estonia began in the 19th century, especially after they were granted the official right to enter the region by a statute of Russian Tsar Alexander II in 1865. This allowed the so-called Jewish 'Nicholas soldiers' (often former cantonists) and their descendants, First Guild merchants, artisans, and Jews with higher education to settle in Estonia and other parts of the Russian Empire outside their Pale of Settlement. The "Nicholas soldiers" and their descendants, and artisans were, basically, the ones who founded the first Jewish congregations in Estonia. The Tallinn congregation, the largest in Estonia, was founded in 1830. The Tartu congregation was established in 1866 when the first fifty families settled there. Synagogues were built, the largest of which were constructed in Tallinn in 1883 and Tartu in 1901. Both of these were subsequently destroyed by fire in World War II.

The life of the small Jewish community in Estonia was disrupted in 1940 with the Soviet occupation of Estonia. Cultural autonomy together with all its institutions was liquidated in July 1940. In July and August of the same year all organisations, associations, societies and corporations were closed. Jewish businesses were nationalized. A relatively large number of Jews (350–450, about 10% of the total Jewish population) were deported into prison camps in Russia by the Soviet authorities on 14 June 1941. In WWII, more than 75% of Estonia's Jewish community, aware of the fate that otherwise awaited them, managed to escape to the Soviet Union; virtually all the remainder (between 950 and 1000 men, women and children) had been killed by the end of 1941. The four Estonians held most responsible for the murders at Kalevi-Liiva were accused at war crimes trials in 1961. Two were later executed; the others avoided sentencing by having gone to exile. From 1944 until 1988 the Estonian Jewish community had no organisations, associations, or clubs. In March 1988, as the process towards regaining Estonia's independence was beginning, the Jewish Cultural Society was established in Tallinn. It was the first of its kind in the late Soviet Union. Unlike in other parts of the Soviet Union, there were no problems with registering either the society or its symbols. The Society began by organising concerts and lectures. Soon the question of founding a Jewish school arose. As a start, a Sunday school was established in 1989. The Tallinn Jewish Gymnasium on Karu Street was being used by a vocational school. In 1990, a Jewish School with grades 1 through 9 was established.

== Georgia ==
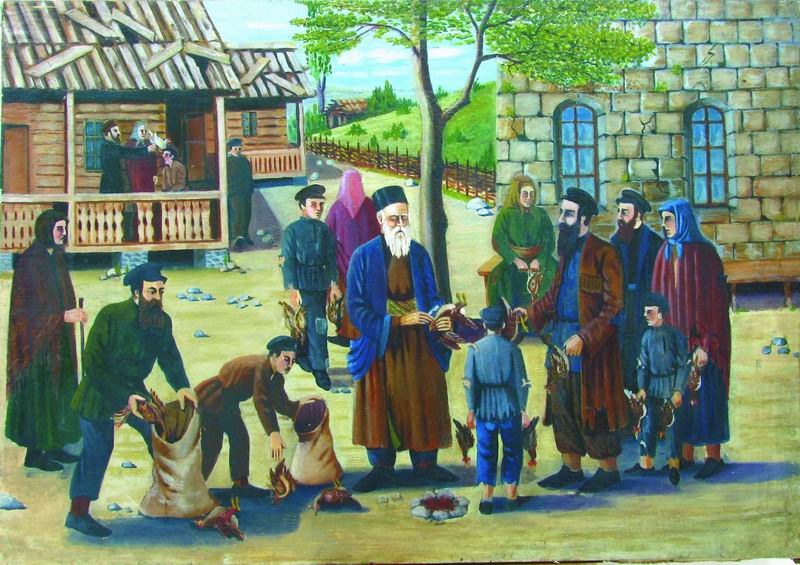
Shechita, Shalom Koboshvili, 1940

The Georgian Jews (Georgian: ქართველი ებრაელები, romanized: kartveli ebraelebi) are from Georgia, in the Caucasus. Georgian Jews are one of the oldest communities in Georgia, tracing their migration into the country during the Babylonian captivity in 6th century BC. In 1801, the Russian Empire annexed Eastern Georgia. In the beginning of the 19th century, Ashkenazi Russian Jews were forced to move to Georgia by the Russian government. The Ashkenazi Jews and the Georgian Jews began establishing contact with each other, but relations were strained. Georgian Jews viewed the Ashkenazim as godless and secular, while the Ashkenazim looked down on the Georgian Jews. Zionism was a uniting cause for the two groups. Beginning in 1863, groups of Jews began making aliyah, mostly for religious reasons. The Red Army invaded Georgia in February 1921, prompting a mass exodus from the region.

== Ukraine ==
Jews living in the Ukrainian SSR underwent Sovietization, together with the rest of the population of the Soviet Union.

Ukrainian Jews were targeted and murdered during the Holocaust when the Nazis occupied Ukraine. Although calculation is difficult, Jewish scholars estimate a total of 1.5 million Ukrainian Jews were killed, leaving only 40% of the Jewish population prior to the war. In 1941, when Western Ukraine was taken over by Germany, Jews were put into ghettos and later sent to death camps where they were murdered. One such event when 33,000 Jews were murdered was the Babi Yar Massacre, which started in 1941. However, the Soviet media reported them as just “Ukrainians,” and not as Jews. The Einsatzgruppen were responsible for the mass murder of up to a million Ukrainian Jews.

The number of Jews in Ukraine has drastically decreased since the late 20th century. The 2001 census showed that 380,000 Jews left Ukraine since 1989, which was 3/4 of the entire Jewish population.

== See also ==
- History of the Jews in Armenia
- History of the Jews in Azerbaijan
- History of the Jews in Belarus
- History of the Jews in Carpathian Ruthenia
- History of the Jews in Estonia
- History of the Jews in Galicia (Eastern Europe)
- History of the Jews in Georgia
  - History of the Jews in Abkhazia
  - History of the Jews in South Ossetia
- History of the Jews in Kazakhstan
- History of the Jews in Kyrgyzstan
- History of the Jews in Latvia
- History of the Jews in Lithuania
- History of the Jews in Moldova
- History of the Jews in Russia
  - History of Jews in Udmurtia and Tatarstan
- History of the Jews in Tajikistan
- History of the Jews in Turkmenistan
- History of the Jews in Ukraine
- History of the Jews in Uzbekistan

=== Aspects of Jewish history specific to the Soviet era ===
- Antisemitism in the Soviet Union
  - Doctors' plot
  - Fifth line
  - Jewish Anti-Fascist Committee
  - Night of the Murdered Poets
  - Rootless cosmopolitan
  - Stalin and antisemitism
- Jackson–Vanik amendment
- Jewish Autonomous Oblast (Birobidzhan)
- Jewish autonomy in Crimea
- Jewish Communist Party (Poalei Zion)
- Komzet
- Lishkat Hakesher
- National Coalition Supporting Soviet Jewry
- Soviet Anti-Zionism
  - 1970s Soviet Union aliyah
  - Anti-Zionist Committee of the Soviet Public
  - Refusenik
  - Soviet Jewry movement
  - Soviet Union and the Arab–Israeli conflict
- Society for Settling Toiling Jews on the Land
- Student Struggle for Soviet Jewry
- Yevsektsiya

=== Post-Soviet Union ===
- Federation of Jewish Communities of the CIS
- Union of Councils for Soviet Jews

=== Pre-Soviet Union ===
- History of the Jews in the Russian Empire
