= Operation Israel Guarantees =

Operation to repatriate Jews to Israel from Russia, Ukraine and Belarus

Operation Israel Guarantees (Hebrew: מבצע עולים הביתה, romanized: Mivtza Olim HaBeita, lit. 'Operation Homecoming') is an operation initiated by the Israeli government in 2022, to get Jews from Ukraine, Russia and Belarus to immigrate to Israel following the Russian invasion of Ukraine.

== Background ==
On February 24, 2022, Vladimir Putin, the President of Russia, announced a general declaration of war against Ukraine (a special military operation), with the aim of occupying all or parts of Ukraine. The war, about an hour after Putin announced a "special military operation", in the Donbas region of eastern Ukraine. The "opening strike", which preceded the invasion of the Russian ground forces, included an attack by aircraft and cruise missiles on a series of military targets throughout Ukraine, including in the capital city of Kyiv as well as in the cities of Odesa, Kharkiv, Lviv, Dnipro and other cities.

Following the invasion, millions of Ukrainians fled the country. Most of them found refuge in the neighboring countries to the west of Ukraine: Poland, Hungary, Moldova, Romania and Slovakia. Many of the refugees have found refuge in the homes of relatives living abroad. The European Union and other countries have announced that they are opening their borders to Ukrainians. Railway companies in several countries such as Poland and Germany allow Ukrainian refugees to travel by train free of charge.

Thousands of refugees fled to Israel, most of them Jewish or entitled to Israeli citizenship on behalf of the Law of Return. The Israeli government prepared for the absorption and naturalization of thousands of Ukrainian refugees in Israel within the framework of the Law of Return, as well as the absorption of refugees who are not entitled to citizenship, as part of the global effort to temporarily absorb the refugees of the war until its end.

Following the war, sanctions were imposed on Russia and Belarus which led to the deterioration of the economic situation. Also, there was fear for personal safety and despair at the state of Russia under Putin's rule and the treatment of critics of the regime. Some feared that the country's borders would be closed and it would not be possible to leave. Others feared being drafted into the Russian army in order to participate in the fighting. All of these led to the immigration of Jews from these countries to Israel.

== Operation ==
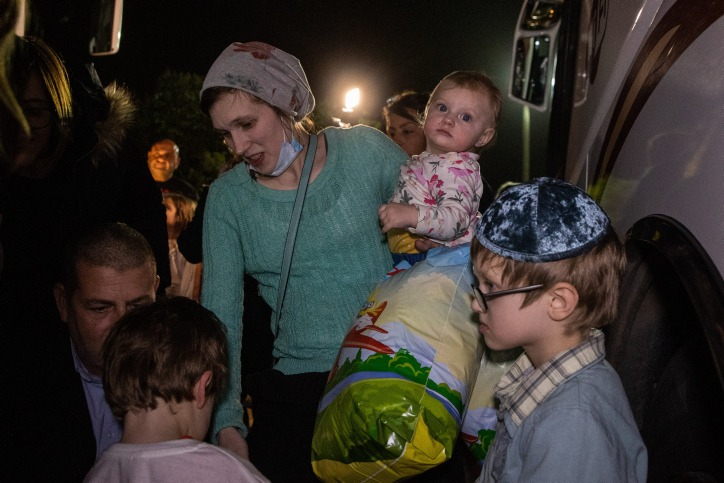
A Ukrainian Jewish family arrives in Israel on 6 March 2022

On March 10, 2022, Prime Minister Naftali Bennett announced the "Israel Guarantees" operation to bring refugees from Ukraine who are entitled to Israeli citizenship under the Law of Return.

On March 21, 2022, as part of Operation Israel Guarantees, the Jewish Agency for Israel announced that it would implement the Aliyah Express program to accelerate the rate of immigration from hundreds to thousands per week. The plan includes the establishment of a joint headquarters for coordination between all rescue and immigration organizations, based on the infrastructure of the Jewish Agency, increasing the number of beds in transit facilities in Europe to absorb some 10,000 immigrants, and preparing for the construction of additional facilities in Romania and a stadium for immigrants in Bulgaria. In addition, the program will include assistance to the efforts of the Ministry of Aliyah and Integration in absorbing arriving immigrants, and the operation of an emergency plan to absorb thousands of young people. On the same day, March 21, more than 6,000 immigrants had been taken in by Israel under the Law of Return, and the number of refugees who arrived in Israel reached almost 15,000. On the evening of March 21, the Minister of Religious Services Matan Kahana instructed the leaders of the conversion system to prepare for the reception of thousands of immigrants from Ukraine, many of whom are interested in conversion. The Jewish Agency and its partners operated about 400 "rescue transports" from Ukraine that brought thousands of Jews to emergency centers set up in neighboring countries - in Poland, Romania, Moldova and Hungary. By April 3, about 70 "rescue flights" with immigrants from Ukraine arrived in Israel.

At the end of March, more than ten thousand new immigrants had arrived in Israel since the Russian invasion of Ukraine. Most of them fled from Ukraine, about a quarter of them came from Russia and Belarus, according to data from the Ministry of Immigration and Integration. By mid-April, since the "Israel Guarantees" operation began, about 13,500 immigrants immigrated, the vast majority from Ukraine.

Most of the immigrants who were of working age engaged in the marketing, services and trade professions in the country of origin.

On June 13 2022, more than 25,000 immigrants had arrived as part of the operation, and as of July 6 2022, more than 30,000 immigrants had arrived. Haifa was the leading receiving city with more than 3,500 immigrants arriving there. Netanya and Tel Aviv also received more than 3,000 immigrants.

From the outbreak of fighting in Ukraine in February to October 2022, over 40,000 new immigrants arrived. By December 2022, about 60 thousand new immigrants from Ukraine, Russia and Belarus immigrated to Israel. Some of the immigrants from Russia returned to it, and many from neighboring Ukraine and Belarus left as well, so the actual number of immigrants who settled in Israel is significantly smaller. At the end of a year after the outbreak of the war in Ukraine, the Ministry of Immigration and Integration published data about the immigrants to Israel from Ukraine, which amounted to over 15,000. According to the publication, the immigrants from Ukraine were absorbed in 172 settlements throughout the country. Haifa is the city that received the highest number of immigrants - 1,764 immigrants. Netanya received 1,066 immigrants, Bat Yam - 878, Nahariya - 802, Ashkelon - 773, Rishon LeZion - 739, Eilat - 296 immigrants.

In the settlement of Revava in the West Bank, a neighborhood was established for immigrants from Ukraine following the war.
