= 1990s post-Soviet aliyah =

Migration of Jews from the former Soviet Union to Israel

In the years leading up to the dissolution of the Soviet Union in 1991 and for just over a decade thereafter, a particularly large number of Jews emigrated from the Soviet Union and the post-Soviet countries. The majority of these emigrants made Aliyah to Israel, while a sizable number immigrated to various countries in the Western world. This wave of Jewish migration followed the 1970s Soviet aliyah, which began after the Soviet government gave special permission to the country's Jewish refuseniks to emigrate.

Between 1989 and 2006, about 1.6 million Soviet Jews and their relatives left the country. About 979,000, or 61%, were received by Israel under the Law of Return, which allows Jews and their non-Jewish spouses to relocate to Israel and acquire Israeli citizenship. Another 325,000 and 219,000 immigrated to the United States and Germany, respectively.

Many of the Ashkenazi Jews who lived in all parts of the former Soviet Union were highly secular, and notable Jewish customs went unpracticed, such as a Brit milah (circumcision ceremony). Upon arriving to Israel, tens of thousands of teenage boys and men underwent circumcision. Among these Jews was also a significant amount of intermarriage; according to the Israel Central Bureau of Statistics, 26% of olim and olot from the Soviet Union did not have their Jewishness recognized by the halakhic definition, but were still eligible for Israeli citizenship due to patrilineal Jewish descent or through marriage to a Jew.

While most of the immigration wave was made up of Ashkenazi Jews, a notable number of Mizrahi Jews also made aliyah from the Soviet Union's Asian territories during this time, such as the Mountain Jews, the Georgian Jews, and the Bukharian Jews, among others. These Jewish communities were much more traditional and substantially less affected by Soviet secularism, maintaining a strong Jewish identity. Indeed, the Haskalah movement, various socialist movements, and the desire for communism that appeared among Ashkenazi communities never made its way to the non-Ashkenazi communities. Furthermore, they maintained a more patriarchal family structure, with lower rates of women's employment and higher numbers of children. By contrast to the highly educated and assimilated Ashkenazim, these Mizrahi Jews more often than not made their living in commerce, crafts, and business.

The overwhelming majority of the Ashkenazi immigrants have been credited with boosting Israel's economy, helping grow the country's famous high-tech industry in particular.

== History ==
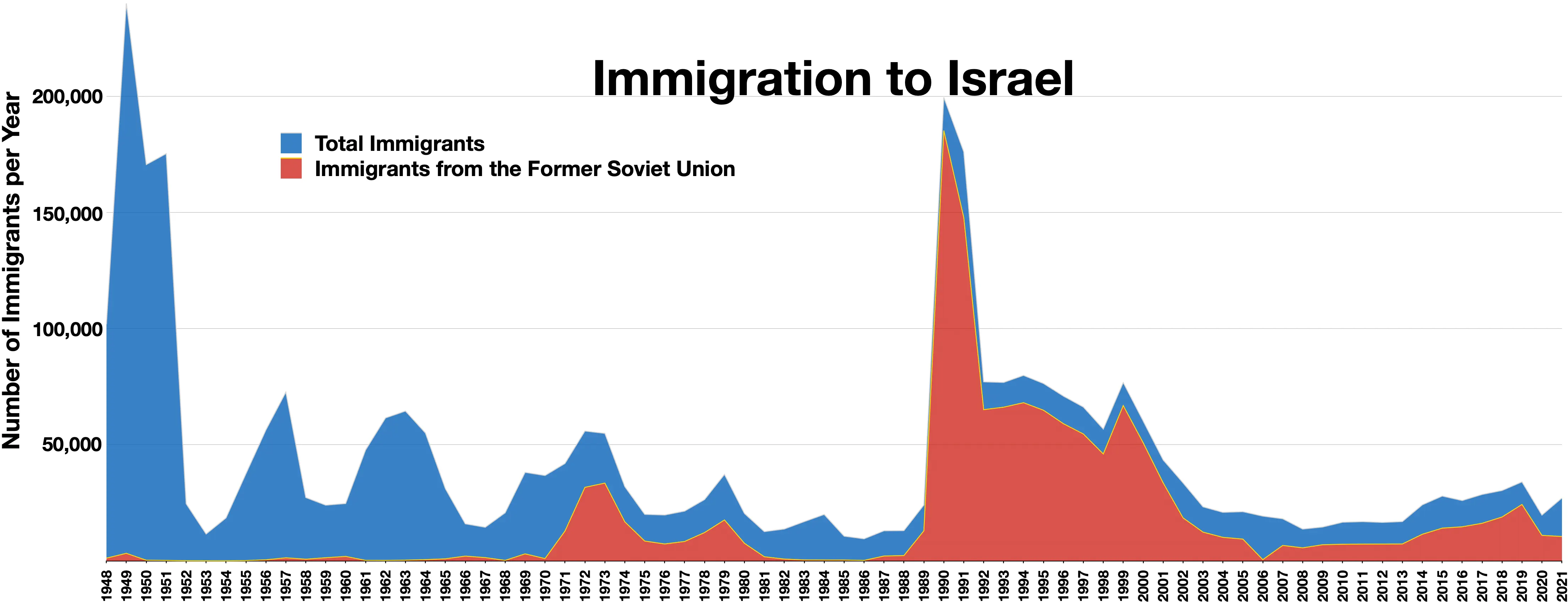
Immigration to Israel Total Immigrants Immigrants from the USSR and Post-Soviet states

Following the Six-Day War in 1967, many Soviet Jews began applying for exit visas and demonstrating for their right to leave. This was accompanied by a worldwide campaign calling on the Soviet government to allow Jews to emigrate. The Jewish immigration to Israel was given a special exemption in 1971, leading to the 1970s Soviet Union aliyah.

Individual citizens of the Soviet Union who wanted to emigrate had to obtain exit visas. Many who sought exit visas were denied. Those who tried to escape the USSR, and did not succeed, called refuseniks, were often branded traitors, fired from their jobs, and subject to public harassment. Those who received exit visas lost their Soviet citizenship and had to pay an exit tax. Under the Communist regime, real estate assets such as apartments usually belonged to the state, and emigrants had to cede those assets in the majority of cases. After the fall of the Soviet Union and the establishment of capitalism in Russia and other former Soviet republics, those laws were canceled. On July 1, 1991, a change in Soviet law came into effect under which emigrants would no longer have to forfeit their Soviet citizenship. From then, emigrants who left the Soviet Union and its successor states after the fall of the Soviet Union were able to keep their assets, and those from successor states which allowed dual citizenship were able to retain their citizenship.

In response to growing international pressure, the Soviets began allowing Jews to emigrate in limited numbers annually starting in 1968, officially for "family reunification". Initially, most went to Israel, but after 1976, the majority began immigrating to the United States, which had a policy of treating Soviet Jews as refugees under the Jackson-Vanik amendment. In total, some 291,000 Soviet Jews were granted exit visas between 1970 and 1988, of whom 165,000 immigrated to Israel and 126,000 to the United States.

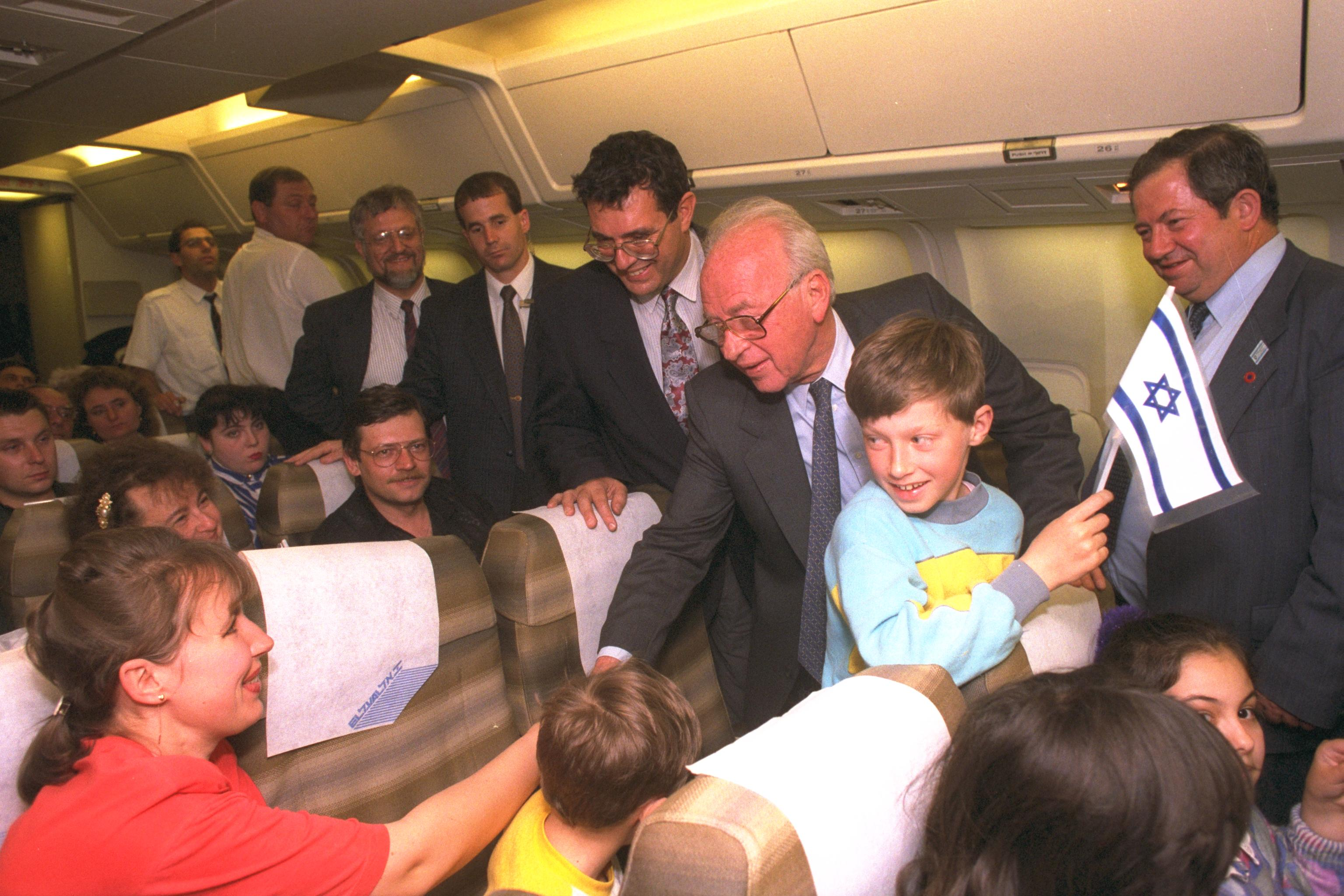
Prime Minister Yitzhak Rabin shakes hands with new Russian immigrants on their flight from Russia to Israel. 27 April 1994.

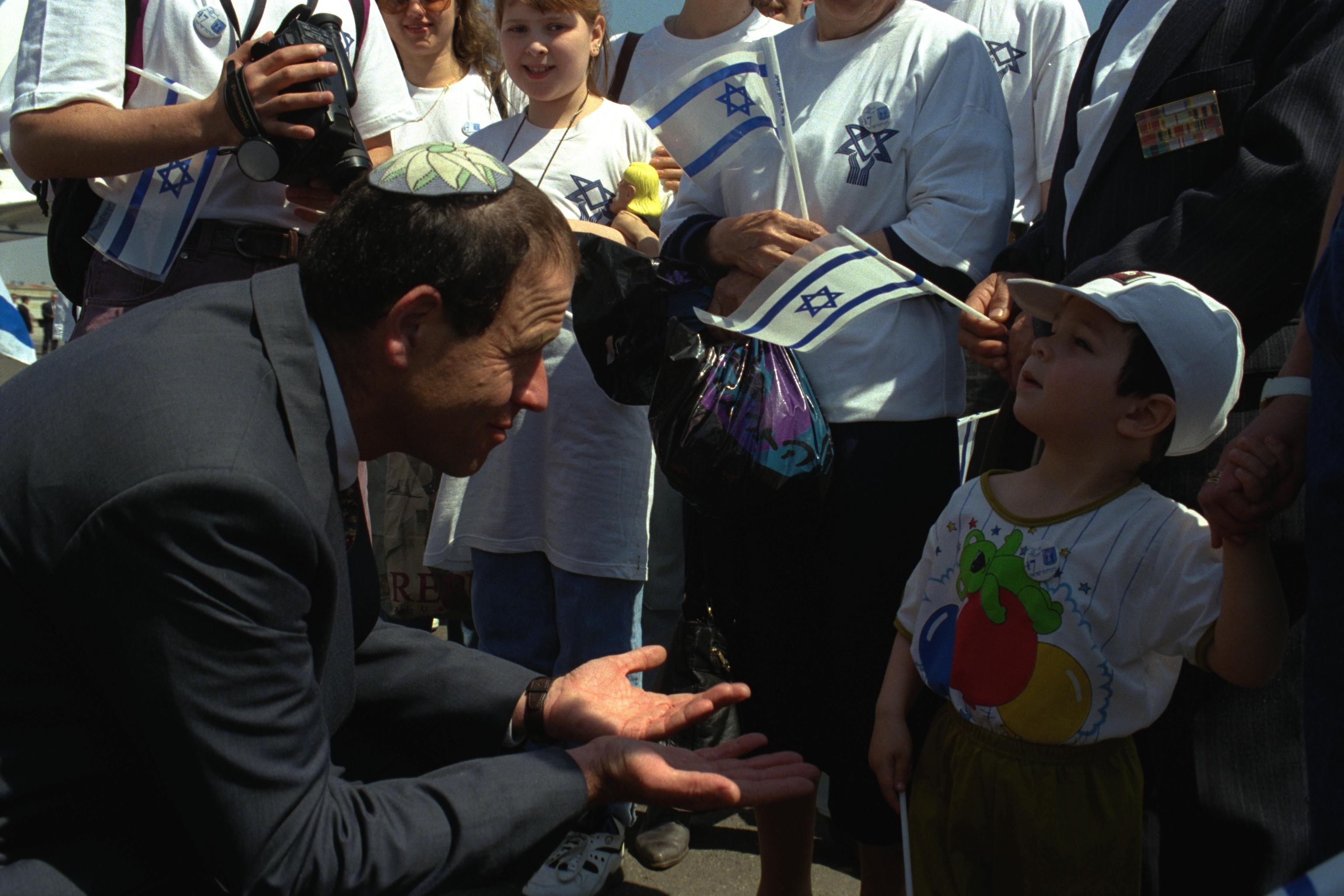
Jewish Agency Chairman Avraham Burg welcomes new Russian immigrants upon their arrival at Ben Gurion Airport. 10 May 1995.

In 1989, Soviet General Secretary Mikhail Gorbachev decided to lift restrictions on emigration. That same year, 71,000 Soviet Jews emigrated, of whom only 12,117 immigrated to Israel. In Vienna, a major transit point for immigration to Israel, some 83% chose to go to the United States. In October 1989, the US government stopped treating Soviet Jews as refugees, as another country, Israel, was willing to accept them unconditionally. However, granting refugee status to Soviet Jews persisted in some form, as the Lautenberg Amendment to the Foreign Operations Appropriations Act (Section 599D) required the executive branch to establish refugee processing categories for Jews, Evangelical Christians, Ukrainian Catholics, and Ukrainian Orthodox Church members and give members of these categories an enhanced opportunity to qualify for refugee status. In 1990, 185,227 Soviet immigrants arrived in Israel (out of about 228,400 Jews who left the Soviet Union that year). Approximately 148,000 more Soviet immigrants arrived in Israel in 1991. Immigration to Israel dropped off significantly from then on but remained steady between 1992 and 1995. In 1992, 65,093 Soviet immigrants arrived in Israel, followed by 66,145 in 1993, 68,079 in 1994, and 64,848 in 1995. From then on, Soviet immigration dipped below 60,000 per year for the next few years, though a spike occurred in 1999 when 66,848 immigrants arrived in Israel. This decline continued into the 2000s. In 2000 50,817 immigrants arrived followed by 33,601 in 2001, and after that immigration to Israel from the former Soviet Union declined to less than 20,000 per year.

As the wave of emigration began, Soviet Jews who wanted to emigrate left the Soviet Union for various European countries and began gathering at transit points, from which they were flown to Israel, and the Israeli government ordered the national airline El Al to put every available plane at the disposal of the immigrants. Some Soviet immigrants also came by sea on chartered ships.

Before the opening of direct flights between Moscow and Tel Aviv, Hungary played a crucial intermediary role in the emigration of Soviet Jews. Between 1989 and 1991, over 160,000 Soviet Jewish refugees transited through Budapest under a joint program operated by Malév Hungarian Airlines and the Jewish Agency. This makeshift air corridor became the main route for aliyah during this transitional period, as Hungary actively aligned its emerging post-Communist identity with humanitarian and pro-Western commitments, despite the risks posed by terrorist threats and internal political pressures.

Direct flights from the Soviet Union to Israel carrying immigrants took place in January and February 1990. The first direct flight, which carried 125 immigrants, departed Moscow on January 1, 1990. On February 22, 1990, the Soviet government suspended the direct flights. Soviet Foreign Minister Eduard Shevardnadze had ordered the direct flights stopped following a speech by Israeli Prime Minister Yitzhak Shamir in the Jerusalem neighborhood and settlement of Neve Yaakov, a predominantly Russian immigrant neighborhood over the Green Line, hinting that Soviet immigrants would be housed in Israeli settlements. Direct flights were resumed in August 1991. In December 1991, the Soviet Union itself collapsed. Eventually, every city in the former Soviet Union with a large Jewish population became a staging point for direct flights.

In the aftermath of breakup of the Soviet Union, a series of wars erupted in areas of the former Soviet Union, and Jewish refugees from these war-torn areas were evacuated to Israel with the help of the Jewish Agency. During the War in Abkhazia, all Jews who wished to flee Abkhazia were evacuated and resettled in Israel. Jews from Chechnya fleeing the First Chechen War were evacuated to Israel in a rescue operation conducted by the Israeli government and Jewish Agency lasting several months. During the War of Transnistria in Moldova, Jews fleeing the war area went to cities such as Chișinău and Odessa, from where they were flown to Israel.

== Absorption in Israel ==
=== Geographical dissemination ===
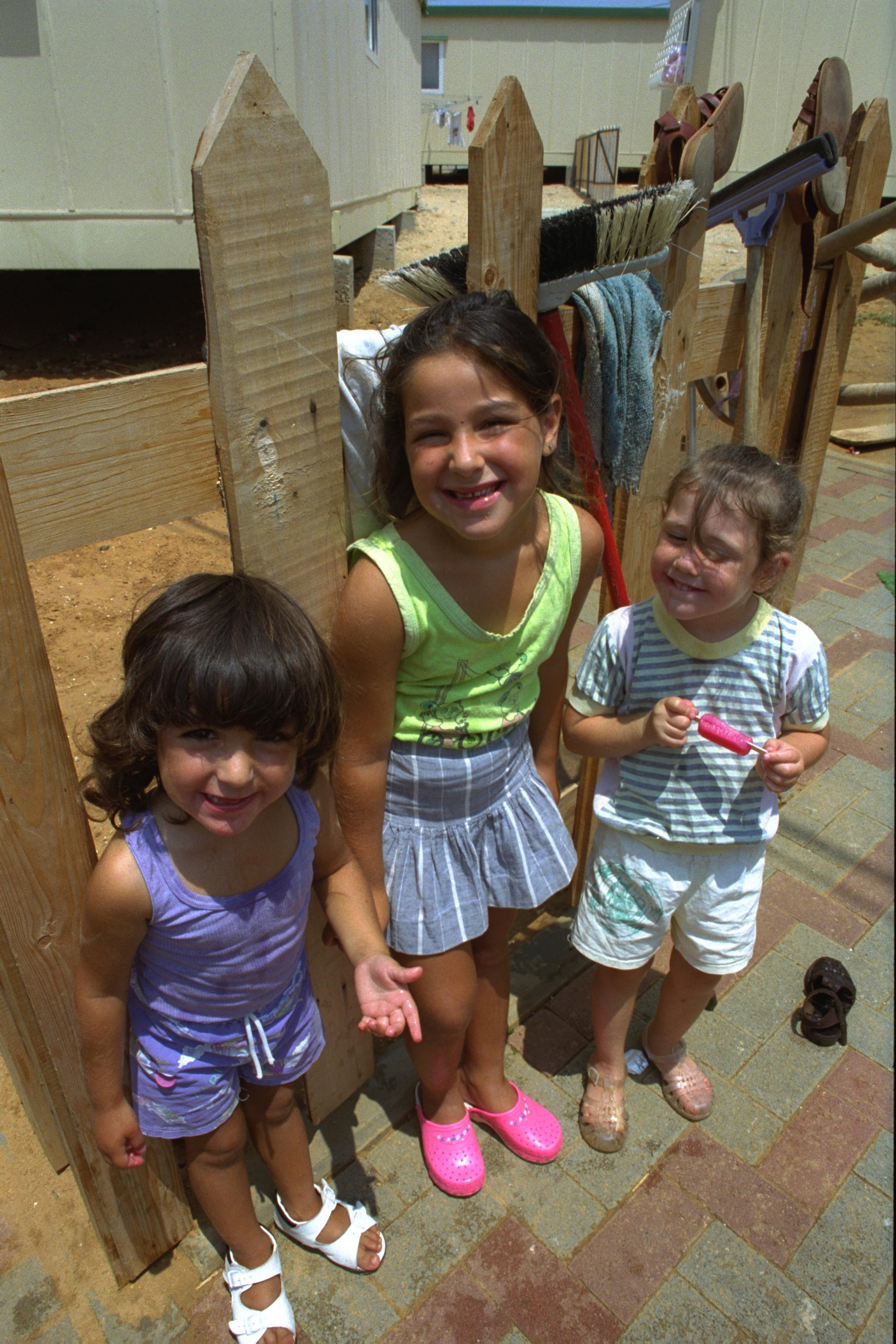
Soviet immigrant children in the caravan neighborhood of Bat Yam, July 1991.

The abruptness and extensiveness of this immigration wave brought about an immediate severe shortage of housing in Israel, in the Gush Dan area in particular, and a corresponding drastic rise in the prices of residential apartments. As a result, Ariel Sharon, then Israel's Minister for Housing Construction, initiated several programs to encourage the construction of new residential buildings, which partly included the concession of different planning procedures. When those resources were inadequate to the growing immigration wave, and many immigrants remained lacking a roof, within two years about 430 caravan sites were set up across Israel, comprising 27,000 caravans. The largest caravan site was founded in Beersheba, consisting of 2,308 housing units.

After that period, the immigrants dissipated throughout Israel. But this immigration wave exhibited a phenomenon common to previous Israeli immigration waves: the efforts of the state to transfer the immigrants to the periphery primarily affected immigrants of lower socio-economic status, while those from higher socio-economic levels, who had the resources to resist these efforts, moved to residential areas of their own choice instead, mostly in Gush Dan. (Additional cities to which many of the immigrants moved (willingly and unwillingly) were Haifa and the Krayot urban area, Petah Tikva, Ariel and Ashdod.) Thus, the immigration wave had a clear regional and ethnic aspect: while the majority of the immigrants originating from the European areas of the Commonwealth of Independent States moved to the center of Israel, most of the immigrants who moved to the periphery were from the Central Asian republics and the Caucasus.

=== Absorption characteristics ===
The absorption laws changed with time. The basic government grants given to each immigrant changed rapidly from the late 1980s to the late 1990s. Most of the immigrants initially located on the periphery and later dispersed to the "Russian" neighborhoods. There were cities, mainly in the medium and lower socio-economic levels, in which immigrants constituted over 50% of all the residents.

Many of the immigrants integrated into the Israeli labor market, but the majority remained confined in their own communities. The closed nature of this immigration wave may have been due to its large size, which resulted in neighborhoods of sometimes tens of thousands of people. Also, many immigrants failed to adapt to the receiving society and the society's expectancy that they change to facilitate their social absorption.

Many of the new immigrants found that their former education was not recognized by many Israeli employers, though it was recognized by institutions of higher education. Many had to work in jobs which did not match their expertise, or undergo retraining.

Some of the immigrants chose to stick to the strategy of dissimilation, keeping the originating culture and rejecting the absorbing culture. Other groups of immigrants (the political leadership and younger people) chose to stick with the strategy of intertwining, involving themselves in the surrounding culture while conserving their original culture. These strategic choices were different from those of the previous immigration waves, which commonly chose either to assimilate, rejecting the originating culture and welcoming the absorbing culture, or to intertwine. The immigrants' Israeli-born children, however, have completely assimilated into Israeli society.

=== Politics ===
These people, we [= the Israeli left] told ourselves, have been educated for 70 years in an internationalist spirit. They have just overthrown a cruel dictatorial system, so they must be avid democrats. Many of them are not Jews, but only relatives (sometimes remote) of Jews. So here we have hundreds of thousands of secular, internationalist and non-nationalist new citizens, just what we need. They would add a positive element to the demographic cocktail that is Israel. [...] Or so we thought.

— Uri Avnery, 2013.

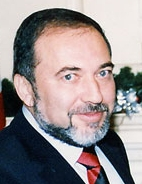
Avigdor Lieberman, leader of Yisrael Beiteinu, whose support base consists of Russian-speaking immigrants.

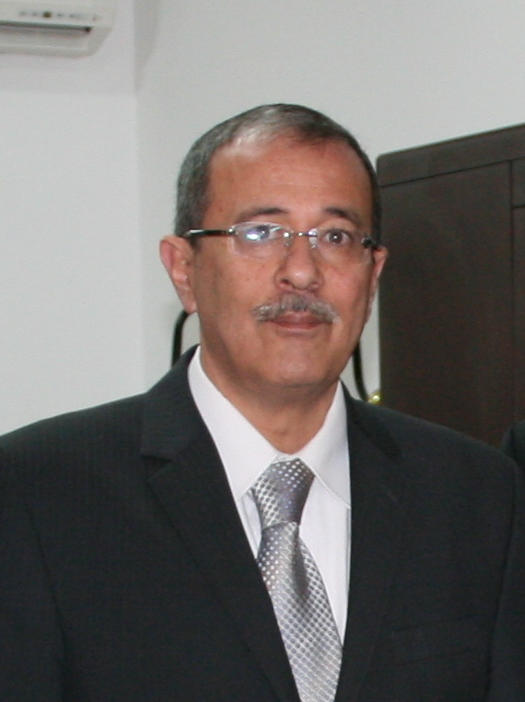
Palestinian Authority spokesman Ghassan Khatib described the Russian immigrants as having "helped shift Israel to the right – to the disadvantage of peace possibilities".

The demand to gain political power which would comply with their unique needs caused a growth of "Russian parties" – in which the party Yisrael BaAliyah gained most popularity in the leadership of Natan Sharansky. The party gained a great success in the elections of 1996 and received 7 mandates. In the elections of 1999 its power descended by one mandate whereas in the elections of 2003 it only gained two mandates and was integrated into the Likud party. Many see the fall of the party of the immigrants as a positive sign to the intertwining in the Israeli society and to the fact that they do not need their own party anymore. The founder and leader of the "Yisrael BaAliyah" party, Natan Sharansky, said after the elections that the reason for the fall of his party was actually in its success to obtain its objectives of intertwining the immigrants in the Israeli society.

In 1999, the politician Avigdor Lieberman (who immigrated with his parents in 1978) established the party Yisrael Beiteinu (“Israel is our home”), as a competitor of Yisrael BaAliyah. Yisrael Beiteinu focused on the national issues and took a hard line towards Israeli Arabs and Palestinian Arabs based upon the view that they do not support the right of Jews to maintain a Jewish state in the Middle East. This party gained a relative success in the elections of 1999, in which they won four mandates and later united with the right wing party "The National Union" which gained 7 mandates in the 15th Knesset and in the 16th Knesset.

During the 1990s the voting of the immigrants in the elections was characterized by consistently being against the present authority. In reality, the immigrants had a considerable part in the falls of the governments of Yitzhak Shamir, Shimon Peres, Benjamin Netanyahu and Ehud Barak.

With the start of the Second Intifada, a big part of the Soviet immigrants tended towards the right wing of the political spectrum in their opinions concerning the Arab–Israeli conflict, and held hawkish positions in the issues of the Israeli–Palestinian conflict and counter-terrorism. Although most of the Soviet immigrants supported the liberal policies in the subjects of religion and state, because this immigration wave was secular in its majority, they avoided support for the Israeli left-wing parties which consisted of similar positions, as a result of them being in favor of compromise with the Palestinians, and their association of left-wing with Soviet communism. Therefore, for example, Ehud Barak was helped in his election campaign by the distribution of a Russian-language book lauding him as an Israeli war hero. Many political commentators claimed after the elections, that this book had a decisive effect in the victory of Barak in the elections. Likewise, the popularity of Ariel Sharon among ex-Soviet immigrants had much to do with his extravagant militaristic record and his tough, aggressive image.

These things have been linked to the immigrants having internalized the perception that they are "less Jewish" than the rest (especially given that many not considered Jewish by the rabbinate and therefore have reduced rights), and therefore compensating by "aligning themselves with the Jewish majority against the Palestinians in the territories and by doing that, making themselves feel like they belong", according to former RTVi journalist Assia Istoshina. Ironically, the Israeli left-wing initially thought the Soviet immigrants would give a boost to their political parties and their secularist, progressive ideas within Israeli society.

The gap between the right-wing positions of the majority of this public as opposed to its anti-religious positions was filled by the Shinui party, a significant secular and anti-orthodox party, which gained a great popularity among ex-Soviet immigrants, as in spite of its left-wing tendency, the Shinui party was not identified with the left. A study done in the 90s, asked Russian immigrants to choose their favorite party political program, with the party name being deleted. Not knowing what party the program belongs to, most immigrants chose the program of the left-wing Meretz (who were then surprised once told about the left-wing party's platform).

In the elections of 2006 Yisrael Beiteinu parted from the National Union party. The logic that stood behind this decision was that in spite of the similarities between the positions of "Yisrael Beiteinu" and National Union party, the two parties have two separate target audiences: while Yisrael Beiteinu turns mainly to the Russian voters and to the right-wings seculars, the National Union party turns mainly to the religious national public and to the public of the settlers. This assumption became clear after "Yisrael Beiteinu" gained alone 11 mandates and became the second largest right-wing party after the Likud, which received only 12 mandates, while most of the mandates it received arrived of course from the target audience of the party – the immigrants from the Russian Federation.

The organization to which I belong, Gush Shalom, once distributed 100,000 copies of our flagship publication (“Truth against Truth”, the history of the conflict) in Russian, but when we received only one sole answer, we were discouraged. Obviously, the Russians did not give a damn for the history of this country, about which they do not have the slightest idea.

— Uri Avnery, 2013.

=== Culture ===
In the Israeli elections of 2009, Yisrael Beiteinu gained 15 Knesset members, its highest ever.

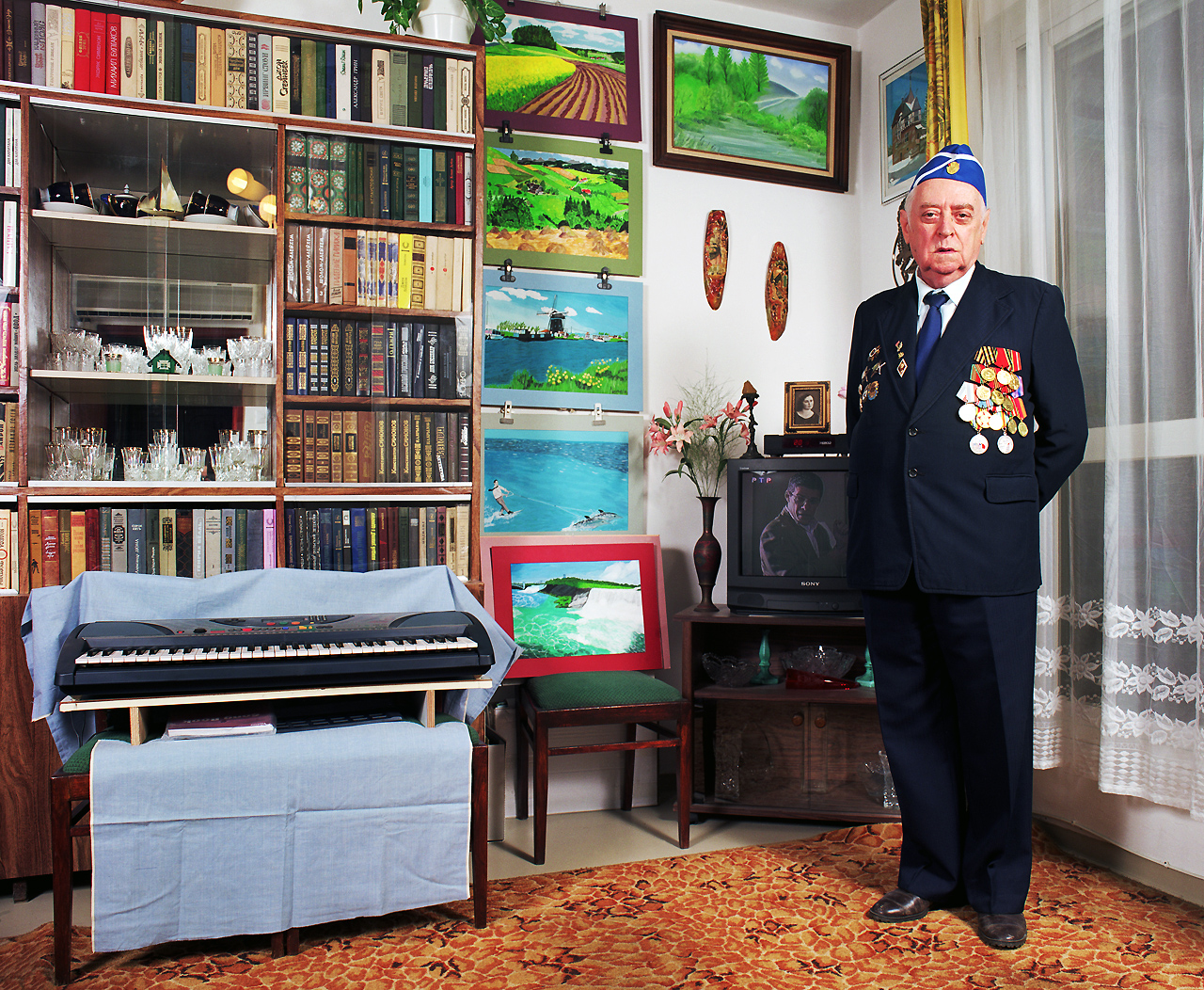
Elderly ex-Soviet immigrant in 2000, posing with WW2 medals, piano, extensive book and painting collection with RTR-Planeta in the background

The weakening of the Zionist ethos coupled with the disappearance of the melting pot perception (which was strong until the 1980s) brought more tolerance from the Israeli society to the attempts of the Russian immigrants to preserve their culture. In tandem, many of the immigrants saw themselves as delegates of Russian culture, and they considered it superior to Israel's largely Levantine culture. These parallel trends, combined with the separate immigrant neighborhoods, helped create a distinct Russian-Israeli culture.

This culture is characterized to a great extent by the combination of characteristic elements from the Soviet Union and Israel. This mixture created a new secular culture which speaks both Hebrew and Russian, and which puts a great emphasis on high culture activities in the fields of education, science and technology, literature, music, theater, etc. Russian immigrants are much more likely to go to the theater or to classic music concerts than Israel-born people, and in literature the Russian aliyah introduced the "fantasy" realism genre into Israeli literature, as opposed to "dry" realism. The Russian immigrants brought the battle reconstruction hobby into Israel, founding a few clubs.

Due to demand from the new immigrants, many Russian language newspapers appeared, and with the development of the multichannel television in Israel during the 1990s, many Russian channels started being rebroadcast in Israel. And in November 2002, a new Israeli-Russian channel, Israel Plus, emerged. Seven Russian newspapers were also established. However, by 2012 Israeli-Russian media was declining, as the children of Soviet immigrants rely far less on it than their parents do.

Though Hebrew courses are offered to every immigrant, many Russian immigrants prefer to speak Russian. As of 1995, only 51% of them were proficient in Hebrew, while 39% could not read Hebrew or had poor Hebrew literacy, and 26% could barely speak or could not speak Hebrew at all. Some 48% spoke only Russian at home, 6% at work, and 32% with friends, while 8% spoke only Hebrew at home, 32% at work, and 9% with friends. The rest spoke in an amalgamation of Russian and Hebrew.

The immigrants were overwhelmingly secular. A 2016 poll found that 81% self-identified as secular, as compared to 49% among all Israeli Jews, and only 4% were Haredi, although 55% expressed some level of religious belief. Their rate of intermarriage and cohabitation with non-Jewish partners was also found to be higher, with 10% of them married to or cohabiting with a partner who was a non-Jew, as compared to 2% among all Israeli Jews. However, the children of the immigrants are considerably more religious than their parents, with only 60% identifying as secular, 70% expressing some religious belief, and 14% being Haredi.

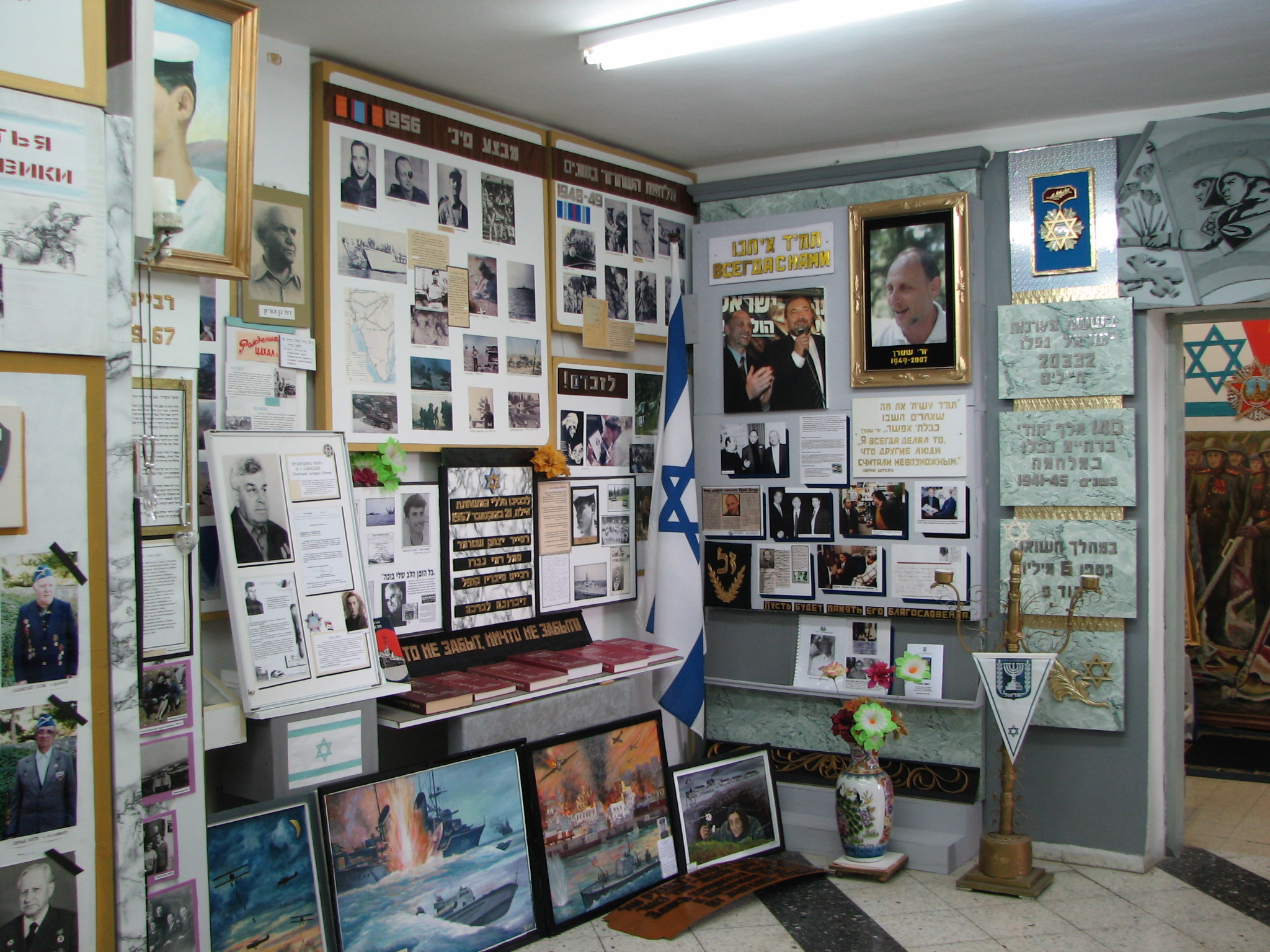
World War II museum in Nesher, complete with shrine dedicated to Liberman and the late Yuri Shtern

The secular character of this immigration wave and their attempts to preserve their eating habits caused in the mid-1990s the opening of stores selling merchandise which was prevalent in the USSR, notably non-kosher meat such as pork. Even though the sale of pork is allowed in Israel, and there are even pig farms in kibbutz Mizra, the marketing of the meat in cities with a high rate of religious or traditional residents constituted as a contravention of the secular-religious status quo in Israel, and caused many confrontations. In most of the cases, the different sides reached a compromise and the pork stores were moved to the industrial regions of the cities.

Many immigrants Hebraized their names, but most kept their Russian ones. However, Russian parents largely gave their children Hebrew first names, and the trend steadily rose throughout the 1990s into the 2000s. Many children of Russian immigrants have been given Biblical first names which are recognized as Israeli but are also common in other countries. While the immigrants themselves did not completely integrate into Israeli culture and hold on to part of their Russian identity, their children are entirely integrated into Israeli society, according to a 2011 study.

==== Halakhic definition of Jewishness ====
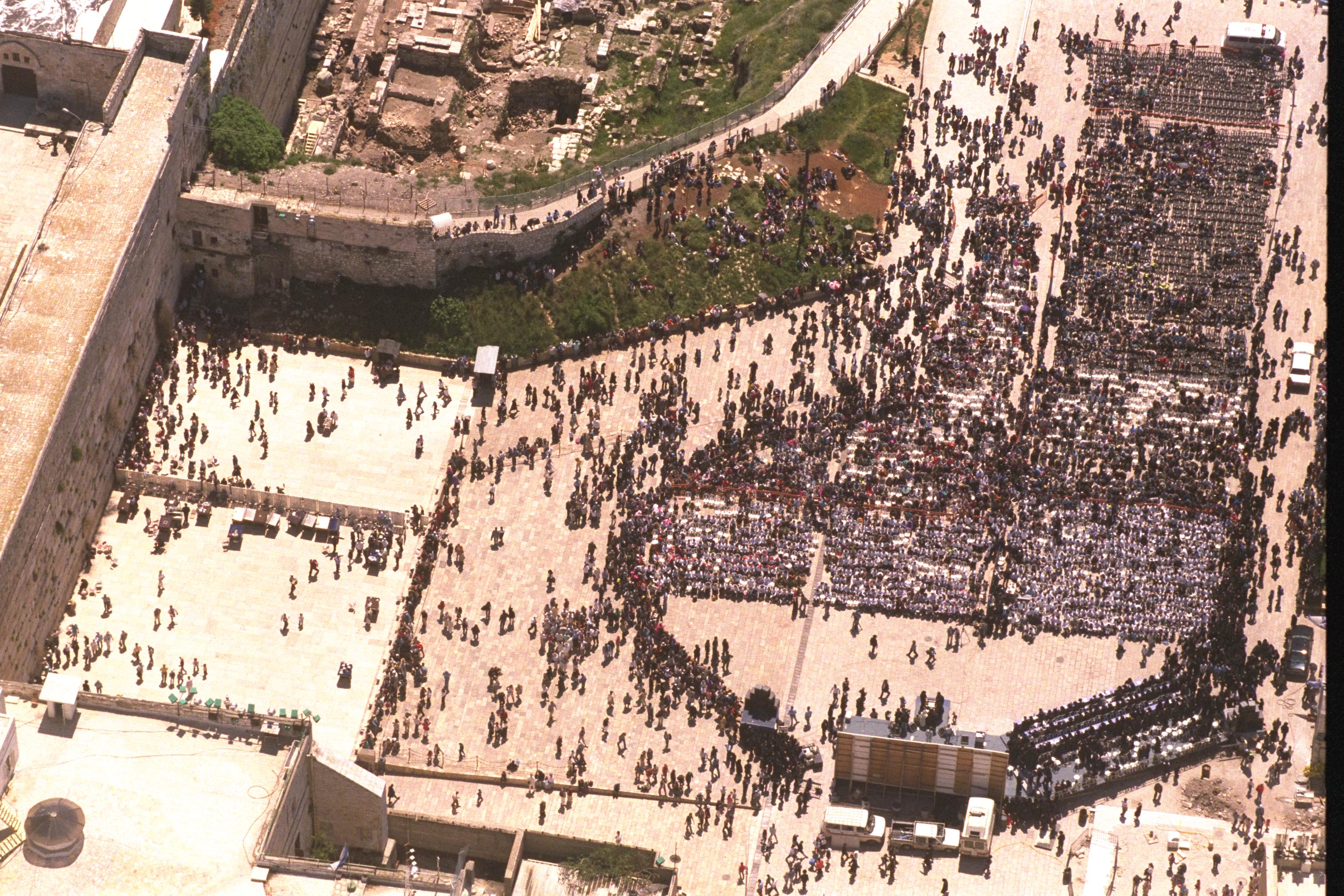
Mass bar mitzvah for 1000 ex-Soviet boys organized by the Gutnick Centre at the Western Wall in Jerusalem, 6 April 1995.

Orthodox interpretations of Halakha recognize only matrilineal descent. However, the Law of Return qualifies anyone who has a Jewish grandparent, or is married to a Jew. As a result of this discrepancy, the immigration wave included people who were not considered Jews by the Israeli Rabbinate, such as children of a Jewish father and non-Jewish mother, grandchildren of Jews, or non-Jewish spouses of Jews, who were eligible under the Law of Return. In 1988, a year before the immigration wave began, 58% of married Jewish men and 47% of married Jewish women in the Soviet Union had a non-Jewish spouse. Some 26%, or 240,000, of the immigrants had no Jewish mother, and were thus not considered Jewish by Halakha, or Jewish religious law, which says a Jew is someone whose mother is Jewish or formally converted to Judaism. This may cause problems with their future marriage in Israel.

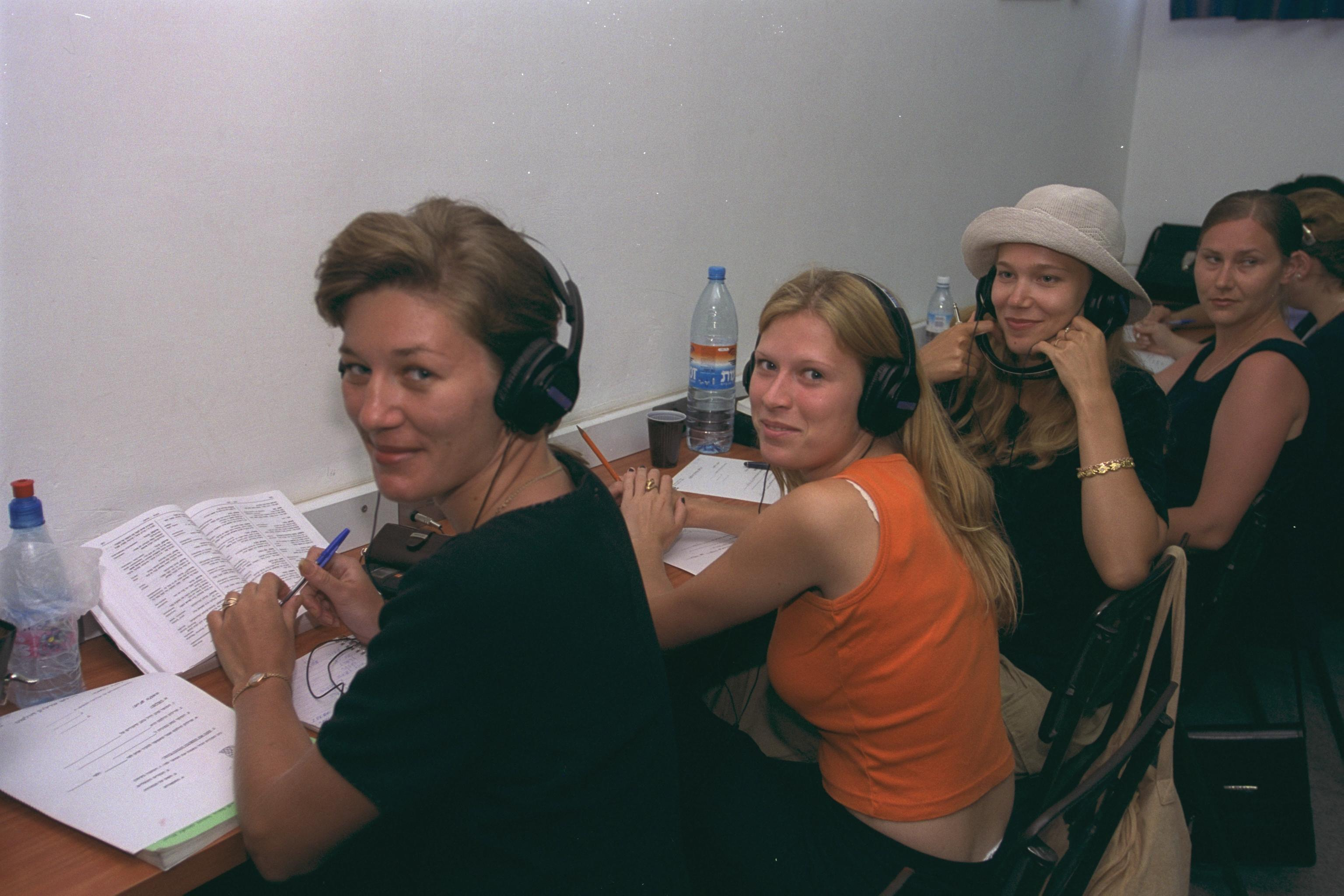
Hebrew classes at an ulpan in Holon, June 2000.

At the start of the mass immigration, almost all those immigrating from the former USSR were considered Jews by Halakha. The proportion of those who were not considered Jewish by Orthodox interpretations of Halakha among the immigrants consistently rose throughout the immigration wave. For example, in 1990 around 96% of the immigrants were Jews and only 4% were non-Jewish family members. However, in 2000, the proportion was: Jews according to halakha – 47%, non-Jewish spouses of Jews – 14%, children from Jewish father and non-Jewish mother – 17%, non-Jewish spouses of children from Jewish father and non-Jewish mother – 6%, grandchildren with one Jewish grandparent – 14% and non-Jewish spouses of grandchildren with one Jewish grandparent – 2%.

According to a leaked document from the Population and Immigration Authority, between 2016 and 2021, 34.3% of Russian olim, 30% of Ukrainian olim, 93.7% of USA olim and 56% of the overall immigration were considered Jewish during these recent years.

== Demographics ==
=== Jewish immigrants from the former Soviet Union ===
Year	Total (000s)	Israel	USA	Germany	Jews according to Halakha in Israel
1970–1988	291	165	126	0	NA
1989	72	12.9	56	0.6	NA
1990	205	185.2	6.5	8.5	96%
1991	195	147.8	35.2	8	91%
1992	123	65.1	45.9	4	84%
1993	127	66.1	35.9	16.6	83%
1994	116	68.1	32.9	8.8	77%
1995	114	64.8	21.7	15.2	72%
1996	106	59	19.5	16	68%
1997	99	54.6	14.5	19.4	60%
1998	83	46	7.4	17.8	54%
1999	99	66.8	6.3	18.2	50%
2000	79	50.8	5.9	16.5	47%
2001	60	33.6	4.1	16.7	44%
2002	44	18.5	2.5	19.3	43%
2003	32	12.4	1.6	15.4	43%
2004	25	10.1	1.1	11.2	NA
2005	18	9.4	0.9	6	NA
2006	10	7.5	0.6	1.1	42%
1989–2006	1,607	979	325	219	NA
1970–2006	1,898	1,144	451	219	NA

==== Evolution among the Israeli populace ====
Year	Births (000s)	Deaths	Natural Growth	Total Fertility Rate
1990	0.7	0.4	0.3	1.58
1991	2.4	1.85	0.55	1.31
1992	3.4	2.7	0.7	1.33
1993	4.6	3.3	1.3	1.52
1994	5.8	4	1.8	1.65
1995	6.75	4.6	2.15	1.72
1996	7.5	5	2.5	1.70
1997	8.2	5.4	2.8	1.71
1998	8.9	5.9	3	1.71
1999	9.3	6.3	3	1.63
2000	10.1	6.7	3.4	1.62
2001	10.3	6.9	3.4	1.56
2002	10.6	7.2	3.4	1.55
2003	11.1	7.25	3.85	1.60
2004	10.9	7.4	3.5	1.55
2005	11	7.6	3.4	1.55
2006	11.2	7.6	3.6	NA
2007	10.3	7.8	2.5	NA
2008	11.6	7.8	3.8	NA
2009	11.7	7.6	4.1	NA
1990–2009	166.4	113.3	53.1	NA

=== Economic integration in Israel ===
The immigrants integrated relatively successfully in the Israeli economy, and they are characterized as having a higher rate of participation in the work market. The Israeli high tech field went through a small revolution with inculcation of several business incubators which were set up to provide employment for the thousands of the scientists and the engineers which came through this immigration wave. This immigration wave has also been credited with boosting Israel's economy, and helping grow the country's famous high-tech industry in particular. Israeli economist Shlomo Maoz said about the Russian aliyah: "The Russians saved Israel, big time. The aliyah improved our situation almost on every parameter". According to Maoz, the infusion of almost a million new consumers allowed hundreds of companies across a wide range of industries to increase their market by up to 20%, and this increase in consumption greatly increased imports and exports. The emerging Israeli high-tech industry was greatly boosted by highly educated Russian immigrants, together with skilled IDF veterans. In addition, Maoz credited the Russian immigrants, who tended to be more ambitious and highly educated than native Israelis, with indirectly boosting native Israelis' productivity by causing more of them to work harder and pursue higher education in order to compete. Economist Yosef Zeira acknowledged that Russian immigrants had a positive effect on the Israeli economy and credited them for ending a recession that came as a result of the First Intifada, but claimed that Israel's high-tech success was mainly due to subsidies from the IDF. According to Zeira, though the Russian aliyah had a positive effect on the economy, "Israel would still be a Western country with a prospering industrial sector, with them or without them." The overall contribution and potential of the immigrants that have contributed to the State of Israel and to Israeli society as scientists, doctors, academics, in technology, research and the arts were of key importance to the overall culture and economy of Israel.

Of the immigrants who arrived between 1989 and 1990, 60% were college-educated, then twice the number of college-educated Israelis. From 1990 to 1993, 57,000 engineers and 12,000 doctors immigrated from the former Soviet Union to Israel. By contrast, there were only 30,000 engineers and 15,000 doctors in Israel in 1989.

When they arrived in Israel, many Soviet immigrants, including highly educated and skilled professionals, initially took menial and semi-skilled jobs and lived in poverty. In 1992, 56% of Soviet immigrants were in the poorest third of the Israeli population, either poor or at risk of falling into poverty, while 10% were in the wealthiest third of society. The Soviet immigrants integrated into the Israeli economy, which during the 1990s was experiencing a boom that doubled the country's GDP per capita and caused the unemployment rate to decline despite the massive increase in the labor force the immigration brought on. By 2010, only 38% of Soviet immigrants were in the poorest third of society, and 27% were in the wealthiest third. In 2012, the average salary of an immigrant from the former Soviet Union was comparable to that of a native-born Israeli Jew, meaning that the economic gap between the Soviet immigrants and the rest of Israeli Jewish society had essentially closed.

According to the Israel Central Bureau of Statistics about 1/3rd of the 1990s immigrants got their former education recognized in Israel as higher education. But less than half of the literate population of workers works in the field of their expertise.

== Impact on Israeli society ==
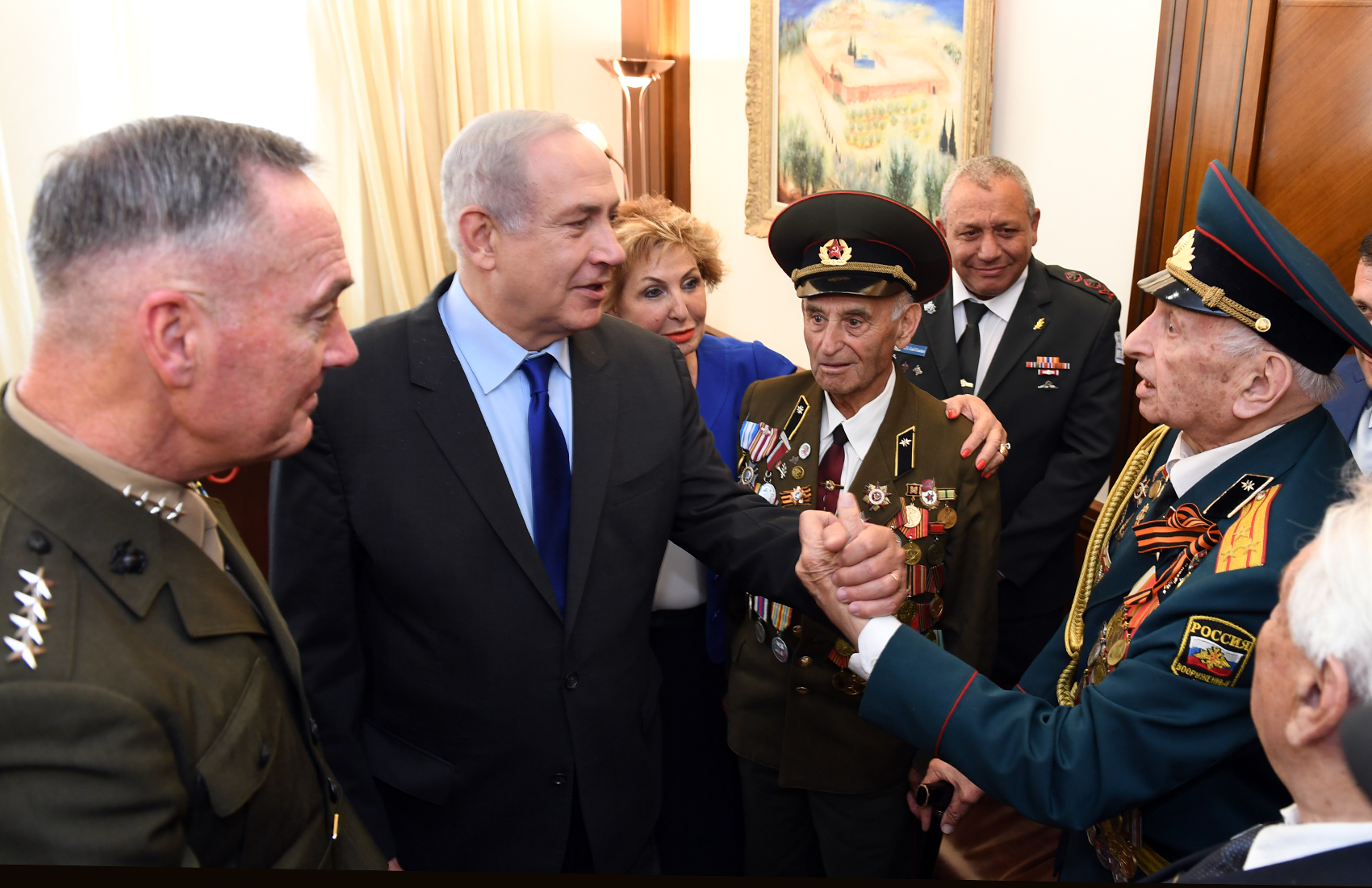
Jewish Red Army veterans in Jerusalem meeting with Benjamin Netanyahu on Victory Day, 9 May 2017.

At first the reaction of Israeli society to the Jewish Soviet Union immigration wave was very positive, and the common phrase "with every immigrant, our strength rises" was used amongst the locals. This positive attitude changed with time as a result of fears in parts of Israeli society to the effects the massive immigration wave would have. The two central reasons for the fear which were related to this immigration wave were the fear of that there may be a percentage of religious and cultural non-Jews amongst the immigrants, and the apprehension that the new immigrants would take jobs away from the veteran population.

Another additional reason for negative attitudes is connected to the general characteristic of a migratory society, the inhospitable attitude of the veteran group towards the population of immigrants. In this respect, negative stereotypical rumors started to spread about the new immigrants. This inhospitable attitude intensified also because—in contrast with the previous immigration waves to Israel—many of the immigrants from this wave kept their culture and language, without trying to blend their customs with their new lives in Israel. Much of the criticism towards this wave was related to their cultural distinction, which included many negative stereotypes regarding Israeli society.

Since that time, the immigrants have succeeded in blending into Israeli society in different fields, and contribute greatly to Israel. In 2009, Science Minister Daniel Hershkowitz said the immigration wave helped the Israeli universities, where one of every four staff members is now a Russian-speaker. At the same time, prime minister Netanyahu said the Soviet Jews have now "integrated into the life of the country and have become a principal and important element in all aspects of life". At the same speech, he called the Russian aliyah "one of the greatest miracles that happened to the state".

== See also ==
- History of the Jews in the Soviet Union
  - 1970s Soviet Union aliyah
- Operation Israel Guarantees
- Russian language in Israel
- Human capital flight
