= 1970s Soviet Union aliyah =

Immigration of Russian Jews to Israel

The 1970s Soviet Union aliyah was the mass immigration of Soviet Jews to Israel after the Soviet Union lifted its ban on Jewish refusenik emigration in 1971. More than 150,000 Soviet Jews immigrated during this period, motivated variously by religious or ideological aspirations, economic opportunities, and a desire to escape antisemitic discrimination.

This wave of immigration was followed two decades later by a larger aliyah at the end of the Soviet Union.

== Background ==
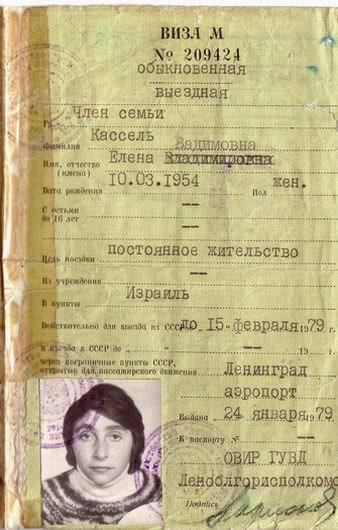
A type 2 Soviet exit visa given to those who received permission to leave the USSR permanently and lost their Soviet citizenship. This visa belonged to 24-year-old Elena Kassel who left via Leningrad Airport on 24 January 1979

In 1967, the USSR broke diplomatic relations with Israel in the wake of the Six-Day War. During this time, popular discrimination against Soviet Jewry increased, led by an anti-Semitic propaganda campaign in the state-controlled mass media. By the end of the 1960s, Jewish cultural and religious life in the Soviet Union suffered from a strict policy of discrimination. This state-sponsored atheism persecution denied Jews the ethnic-cultural rights experienced by other Soviet ethnic groups.

== Emigration policy ==
After the Dymshits–Kuznetsov hijacking affair in 1970 following the crackdown, international condemnations caused the Soviet authorities to increase emigration quotas. Between 1960 and 1970, only 4,000 people had left the USSR. The number rose to 250,000 in the following decade.

In 1972, the USSR imposed a so-called "diploma tax" on would-be emigrants who had received higher education in the USSR. The fee reached as high as twenty times an annual salary. This measure was designed to combat the brain drain caused by the growing emigration of Soviet Jews and other members of the intelligentsia to the West. Following international protests, the Kremlin soon revoked the tax, but continued to sporadically impose various limitations.

== Emigration ==
Prior to the Six-Day War, few Soviet Jews emigrated to Israel. Israel's decisive victory changed the opinion of many Soviet Jews towards Israel. After the war, many Soviet Jews began to demand the right to move to Israel. However, given a choice, many Soviet Jews chose to emigrate to the United States.

== Absorption of new immigrants in Israel ==
In 1968, 231 Jews were granted exit visas to Israel, followed by 3,033 in 1969. From that point on, the USSR began granting exit visas in growing numbers. During the late 1960s and the 1970s, some 163,000 Soviet Jews emigrated to Israel; mostly between 1969 and 1973.

== Dropouts ==
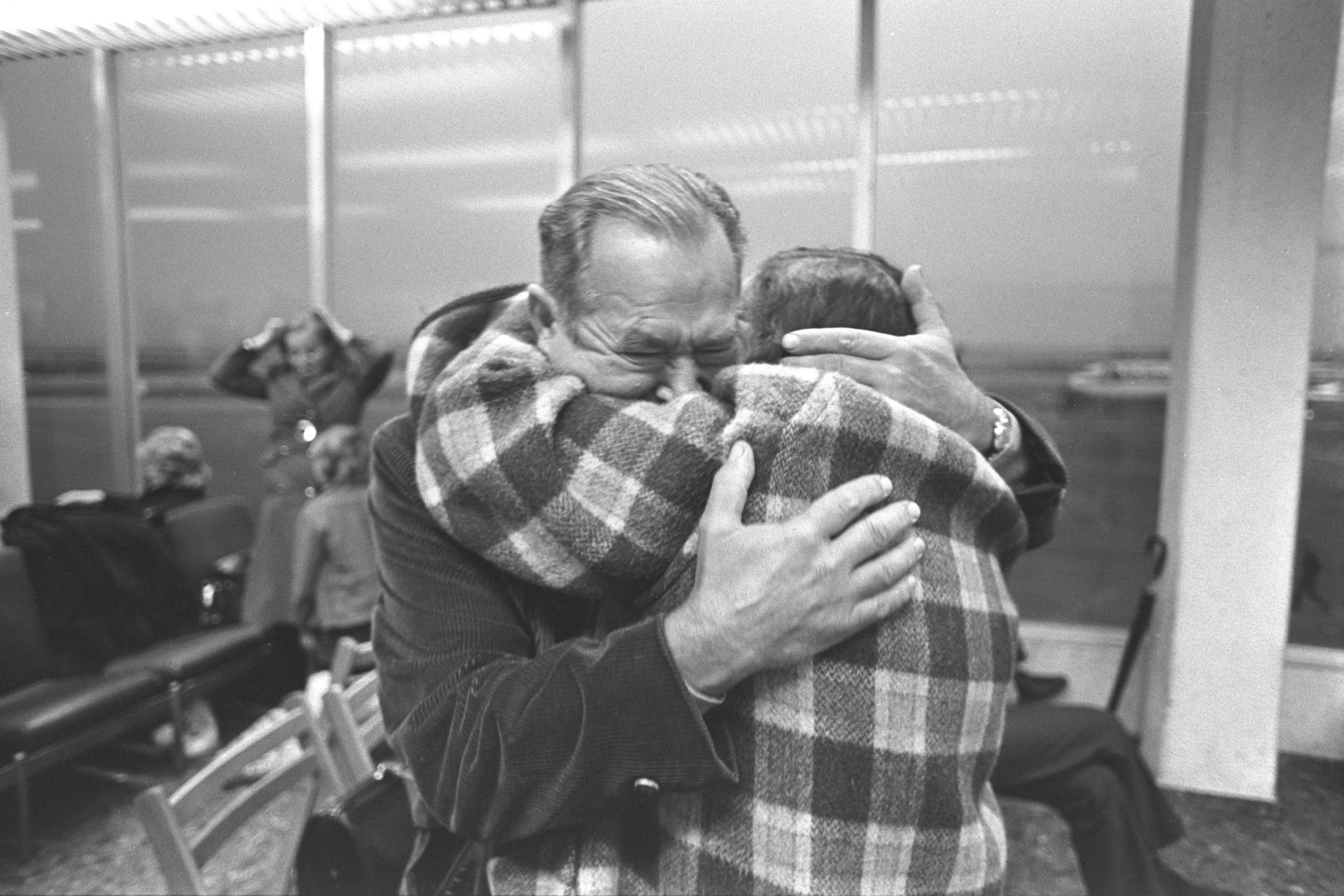
1972. A tearful reunion after 20 years between a brother and sister, who just arrived from Russia, at Lod Airport

While many Jews emigrated to Israel, others chose the United States instead. Known as dropouts, the emigres applied for refugee visas to the US or other Western countries while waiting at transit centers in Austria and Italy. In the beginning, the dropout rate was minimal but it rose over time, going from less than 1% in 1971 and 1972 to 4% in 1973, 18% in 1974, 35% in 1975, and 47% in 1976. The Jackson-Vanik Amendment passed by US Congress in 1974, along with additional US congressional funding for Soviet Jewish resettlement and "reports of work and housing difficulties" in Israel following the 1973 Yom Kippur War created a situation for this dropout rate to rise, with 51,000 Soviet Jews opting to migrate to the US from 1975 to 1980, thereby joining the descendants of 1.5 million Jews who left the Russian Empire prior to World War I, mostly for the United States.

In addition, not counted in the dropout statistics was the number of Soviet immigrants who settled in Israel and, dissatisfied with life there, later decided to leave for other Western countries, with many moving to Rome while trying to obtain visas. The number of these emigrants steadily rose as well, going from hundreds in the early 1970s to thousands in 1974. However, as they were now Israeli citizens who could no longer present themselves to Western immigration officials as stateless refugees, getting immigration visas proved to be harder for them.

Israel was concerned over the dropout rate, and suggested that Soviet émigrés be flown directly to Israel from the Soviet Union or Romania. Israel argued that it needed highly skilled and well-educated Soviet Jewish immigrants for its survival.

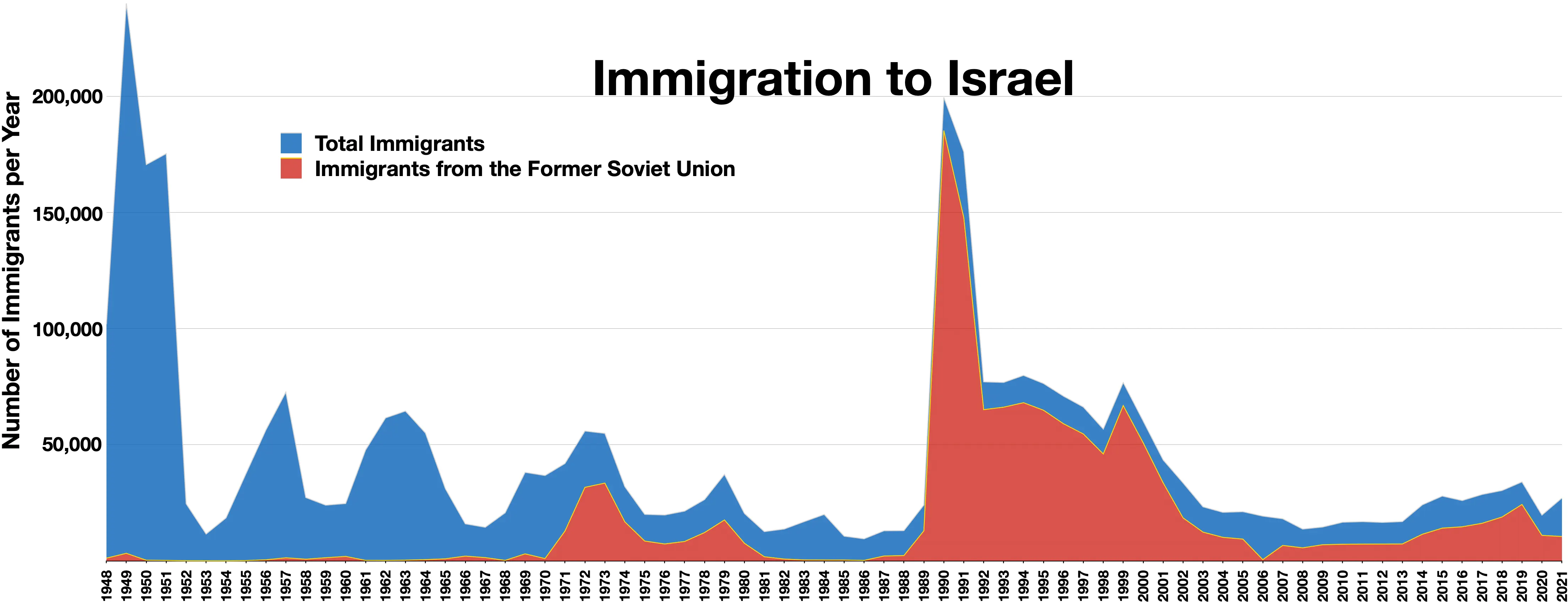
Immigration to Israel Total Immigrants Immigrants from the USSR and Post-Soviet states

In addition to contributing to the country's economic development, Soviet immigration was also seen as a counterweight to the high fertility rate among Israeli-Arabs. In addition, Israel was concerned that the dropout rate could result in immigration being banned once again. According to Israeli Immigrant Absorption Minister Yaakov Zur, "over half of Soviet Jewish dropouts who immigrated to the United States assimilated and ceased to live as Jews within a short period of time...it could jeopardize the whole program if Jews supposedly going to Israel all wind up in Brooklyn and Los Angeles. How will the Soviets explain to their own people that it's just Jews who are allowed to emigrate to the U.S.?"

The Soviet Jews who emigrated to Israel tended to have stronger Jewish identities and largely came from the Baltic states, Moldova, Uzbekistan, Azerbaijan and Georgia, whereas the dropouts were mainly assimilated Jews from the Russian and Ukrainian heartland. Overall, between 1970 and 1988, some 291,000 Soviet Jews were granted exit visas, of whom 165,000 migrated to Israel, and 126,000 migrated to the United States.

== See also ==
- Soviet Jewry movement
- Refusenik (Soviet Union)
- Dymshits–Kuznetsov hijacking affair
- Jackson–Vanik amendment
- History of the Jews in Russia and the Soviet Union
- 1990s post-Soviet aliyah
- Russian Jews in Israel
- USSR anti-religious campaign (1970s–87)
- Migration diplomacy
- Refugees as weapons
- Jewish emigration from Communist Romania
