= 1812 (disambiguation) =

1812 may refer to:

- The year 1812
- Siberia Airlines Flight 1812, 2001 Black Sea crash
- DRD 1812, a character in Farscape
- 1812 (1912 film), a Russian film
- 1812: The Campaign of Napoleon in Russia, a 1972 board wargame

== See also ==
- The 1812 Overture, by Tchaikovsky
