= Israel–Ukraine relations =

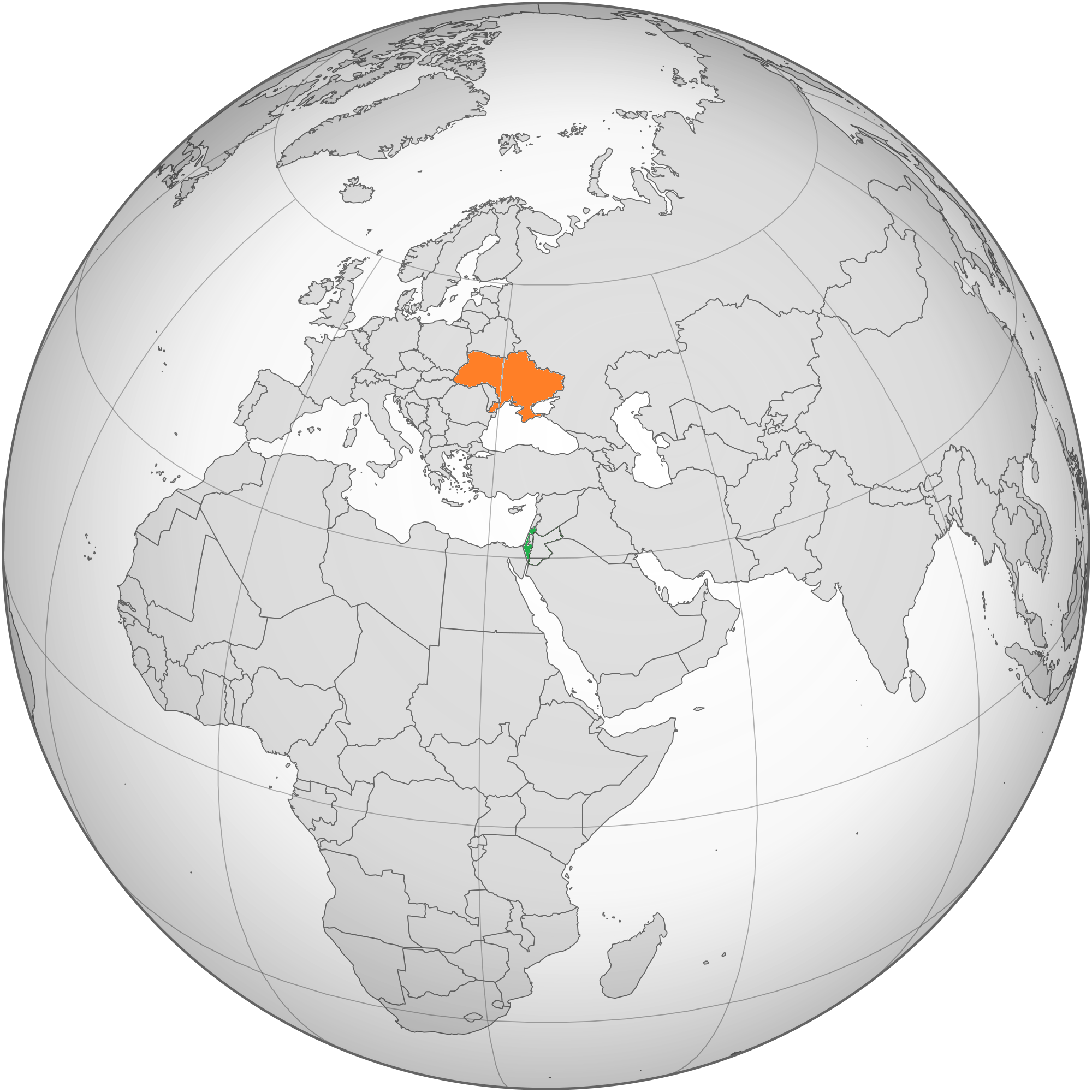
- Israel: Ukraine

Diplomatic mission
- Embassy of Israel, Kyiv: Embassy of Ukraine, Tel Aviv

Envoy
- Michael Brodsky: Korniychuk Yevgen

Israel–Ukraine relations are foreign relations between Israel and Ukraine. Both countries recognized each other on 11 May 1949 (as the Ukrainian SSR) and established de jure diplomatic relations on 26 December 1991 when Ukraine became independent. Israel has an embassy in Kyiv and Ukraine an embassy in Tel Aviv. There are 30,000 Ukrainians settled in Israel, while Ukraine has a longstanding Jewish community. Ukraine was the first state outside Israel to have had both a Jewish president and prime minister simultaneously.

Ukraine and Israel have had tense relations during the current Russo-Ukrainian War. Israel was neutral on Russia's annexation of Crimea in 2014. The Israeli government of Naftali Bennett condemned the 2022 Russian invasion of Ukraine and sent humanitarian aid. The current government of Benjamin Netanyahu also sent humanitarian aid. However, Israel refused calls to impose sanctions on Russia, and refused to send weapons or missile defense technology directly to Ukraine. At the UN, Ukraine has voted to condemn Israel's occupation of the Palestinian territories, and Ukraine recognizes the State of Palestine. Israel joined Russia to vote against a UN resolution affirming Ukraine's territorial integrity. Ukraine acknowledged Israel's right to self-defense but demanded Israel end its war against Gaza and sent humanitarian aid to Gaza.

== History ==
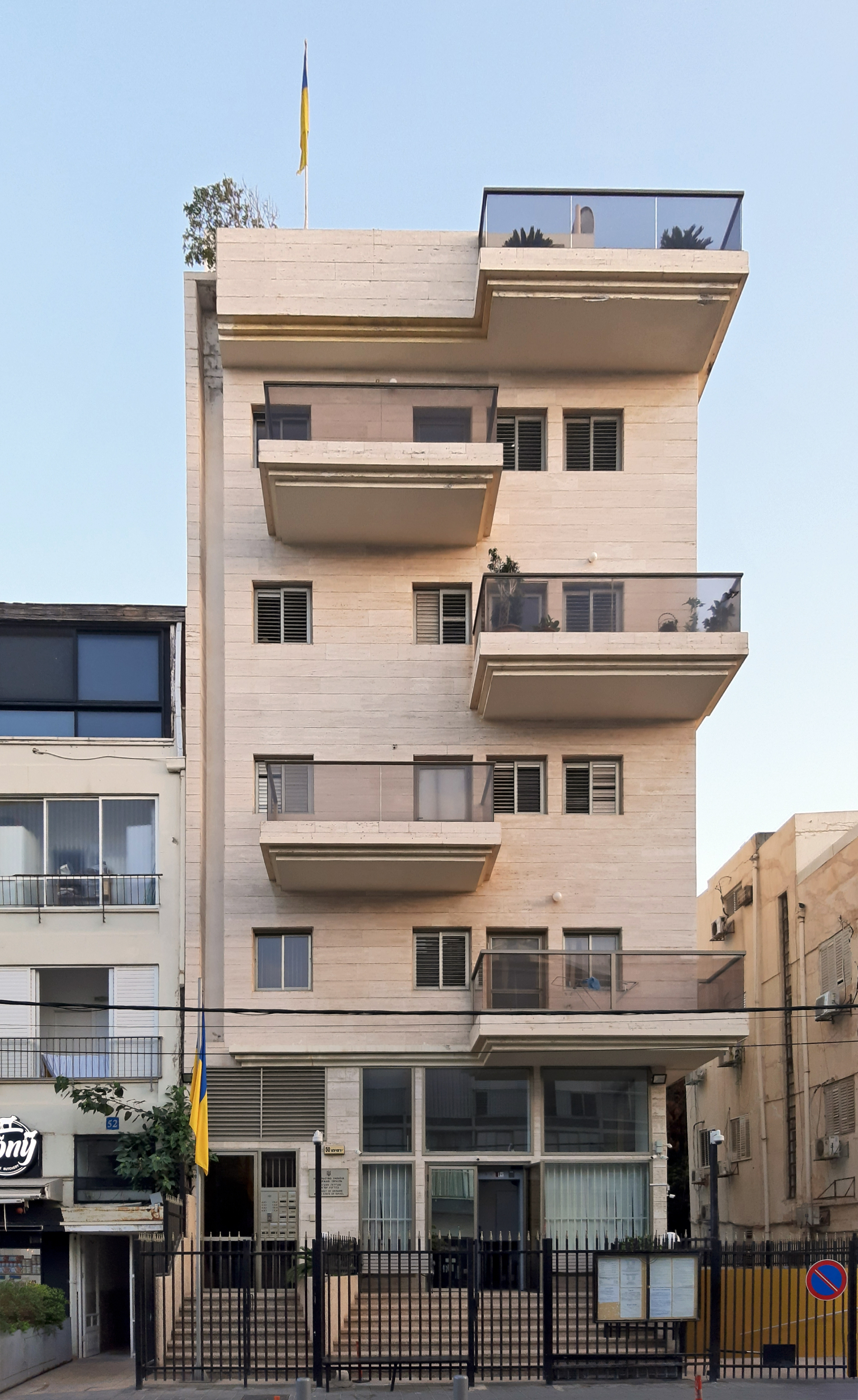
Embassy of Ukraine in Tel Aviv

Ukraine rates fourth in the number of people recognized as "Righteous Among the Nations" for saving Jews during the Holocaust, with 2,673 individuals recognized as of December 2024. The Shtundists, an evangelical Protestant denomination which emerged in late 19th century Ukraine, helped hide Jews. Ukrainian Greek Catholic cleric Klymentiy Sheptytsky was recognized as one of the Righteous among the Nations by the State of Israel in 1995.

Between 1941 and 1945, approximately 1.5 million Jews were killed during the Holocaust within the territory of present-day Ukraine.

When Ukraine was part of the Soviet Union as the Ukrainian SSR, it was one of 33 states that voted for separate Jewish and Arab states in Mandatory Palestine during the UN Partition Plan in 1947. The Soviet Union broke off relations with Israel in 1967 after the Six-Day War and restored diplomatic relations in 1991, when Ukraine became independent.

In November 2014, Oleg Vyshniakov, a Ukrainian entrepreneur and public figure, was appointed to Israel's honorary consul in western Ukraine. In May 2015 he was inaugurated as honorary consul of Israel in Lviv.

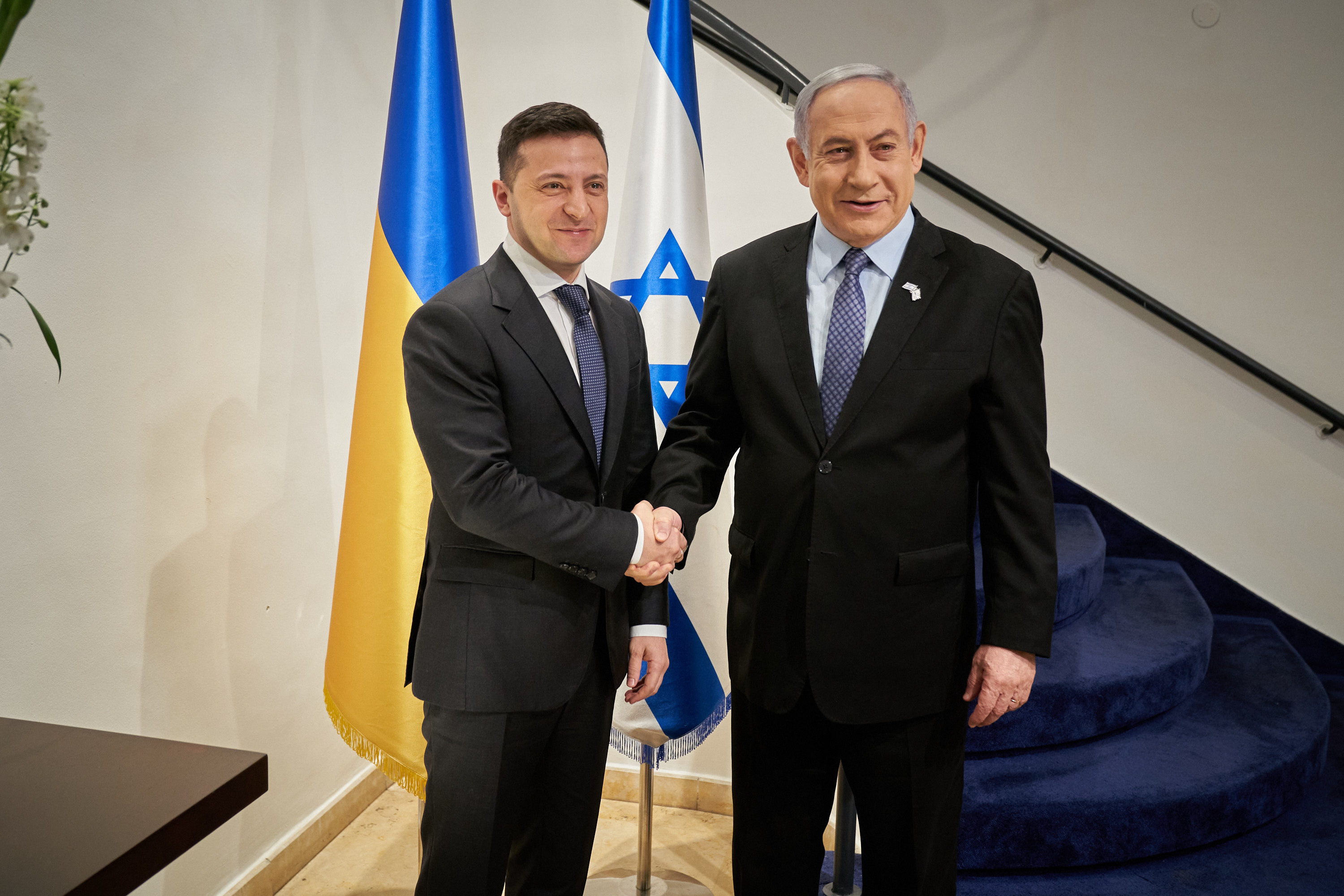
Israeli Prime Minister Benjamin Netanyahu meets with Ukrainian President Volodymyr Zelenskyy in Jerusalem, 24 January 2020

=== Russo-Ukrainian War ===
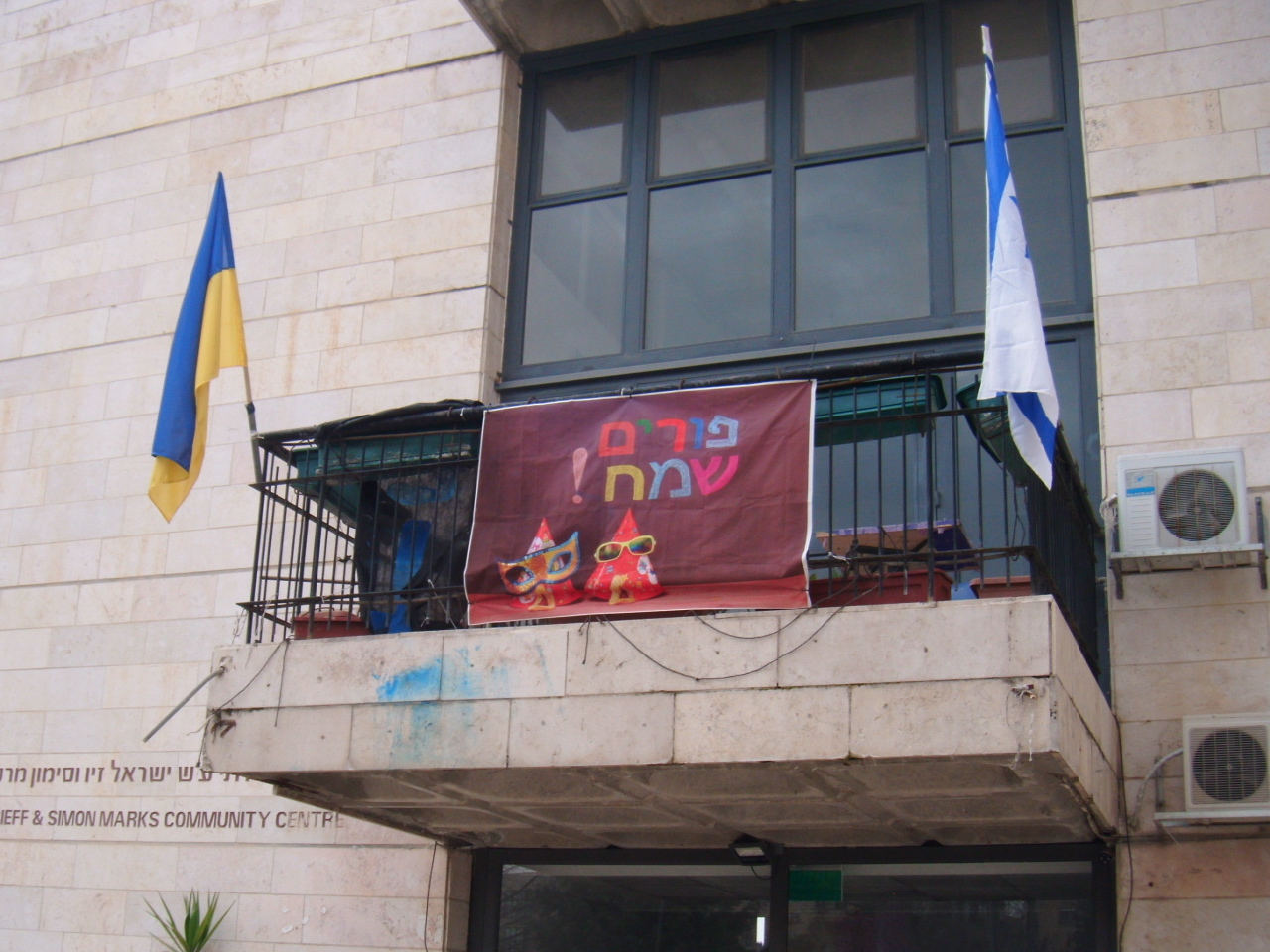
Ukrainian and Israeli national flags at a community centre in Jerusalem, following Russian invasion of Ukraine

After Russia annexed Crimea in March 2014, Israel did not vote for a UN resolution condemning the annexation. US State Department Spokeswoman Jen Psaki said the US was "surprised that Israel did not join the vast majority of countries that voted to support Ukraine’s territorial integrity". The Israeli government said it did not vote due to a public workers strike. Israeli prime minister Benjamin Netanyahu later refused to condemn Russia's annexation.

In February 2022, during the buildup to Russia's invasion of Ukraine, Yevgen Korniychuk, the Ukrainian Ambassador to Israel, published a Facebook post, accusing Israeli Foreign Minister Yair Lapid of repeating "rhetoric of Russian propaganda." The Israeli Foreign Ministry summoned Korniychuk for an official reprimand.

When Russia invaded Ukraine on 24 February 2022, Israeli Foreign Minister Lapid and Israeli Prime Minister Naftali Bennett expressed support for Ukraine, although Bennett did not condemn Russia. Bennett offered humanitarian aid to the Ukrainians and help to Jews who wanted to leave Ukraine. Israel's foreign ministry stated that it respected Ukraine's territorial integrity and sovereignty, but did not mention Russia.

On 25 February 2022, Ukrainian President Volodymyr Zelenskyy requested Israeli Prime Minister Naftali Bennett mediate in the war with Russia, according to the Ukrainian envoy to Israel. On 5 March, Bennett flew to Moscow and held a three-hour meeting with Russian President Vladimir Putin about the war in Ukraine, after which Bennett spoke to Zelenskyy by phone. At the Kremlin, Bennett also raised the issue of the Jewish community caught up in the invasion. An unnamed senior Ukrainian official accused Bennett of having "proposed that we surrender", claiming Bennett urged Zelenskyy to "take the offer" of a "peace deal" from Putin. This report was denied by the Israeli Prime Minister's office and a senior adviser to Zelenskyy. (Note: On 6 July 2022, Israeli officials stated that Israel was no longer involved in mediation efforts between Ukraine and Russia. (Then) former Prime Minister Naftali Bennett suggested in February 2023 that disagreement with the United States and the United Kingdom, which advocated a more "aggressive approach", along with the Bucha massacre, had led to the failure of Israeli-mediated peace talks. On 30 January 2023, Israeli Prime Minister Benjamin Netanyahu expressed interest in taking a mediating role in the conflict, if this was supported by Russia, Ukraine and the United States.)

Israel declined to co-sponsor a UN Security Council resolution condemning the Russian invasion; the United States expressed disappointment. Israel later voted in favour of the resolution condemning the invasion.

On 11 March 2022, Ukraine's ambassador to Israel Korniychuk urged Israel to impose sanctions on Russia, take more Ukrainian refugees, and supply defensive weapons. In a speech to Ukraine's parliament on 20 March, President Zelenskyy chastised Israel, asking why it was not sending Ukraine missile defenses or condemning Russia for its invasion. Israeli Foreign Minister Yair Lapid replied that Israel would help Ukraine's people "as much as we can" by continuing to send humanitarian aid. On 5 April, President Zelenskyy asserted that he wanted Ukraine to become a "big Israel with its own face", with members of the armed forces present "in all institutions" of the country, abandoning hopes of becoming "absolutely liberal." On 3 July, Israel lifted its restrictions on the numbers of Ukrainian refugees it would take. Zelenskyy welcomed the decision. An estimated 15,000 Ukrainian refugees had fled to Israel.

On 20 April 2022, Defense Minister Benny Gantz announced Israel would send protective equipment such as flak jackets and helmets to the Ukrainian emergency services, but not to the Ukrainian military.

In October 2022, after a wave of Russian missile strikes, Zelenskyy lambasted Israel for refusing to supply missile defenses. Shortly after, however, he said that relations with Israel were improving as they had begun sharing intelligence about the Iranian drones being used by Russia.

In January 2023, Israel refused a US request to transfer MIM-23 Hawk batteries and anti-ballistic missiles to Ukraine.

In May 2023, an Israeli-made missile alert system began operating in Kyiv. Ukrainian Ambassador to Israel Korniychuk, credited Netanyahu's personal involvement in this process. However, Israel continued to refuse to supply Ukraine with missile defenses. Israel noted the danger posed by Russians capturing an Iron Dome system, which could result in Iran gaining access to it and reverse-engineering the weapons. In October 2023 it was reported that a version of the Tzeva Adom alert system modified for suit Ukraine "would start working in Kyiv soon." This system calculates the time of approach which is then notified to the civilians by a siren which gives a special signal that indicates the amount of time the people have to hide. The system became operational on 24 July 2025.

Israel's refusal to supply weapons to Ukraine (in March 2022 Israel also rejected a Ukrainian request for cyber weaponry, including Pegasus, to be used against Russia) has been criticized by several Israeli politicians from the Liberal wing of the Likud Party who proposed sending Russian-made weapons captured from Hamas and Hezbollah to Ukraine. In January 2025 Ukrainian Ambassador Korniychuk and Israeli Deputy Foreign Minister Sharren Haskel again discussed the possibility of transferring captured Russian-made weapons to Ukraine. Over 60% of weapons captured by the IDF from Hezbollah are Russian-made.

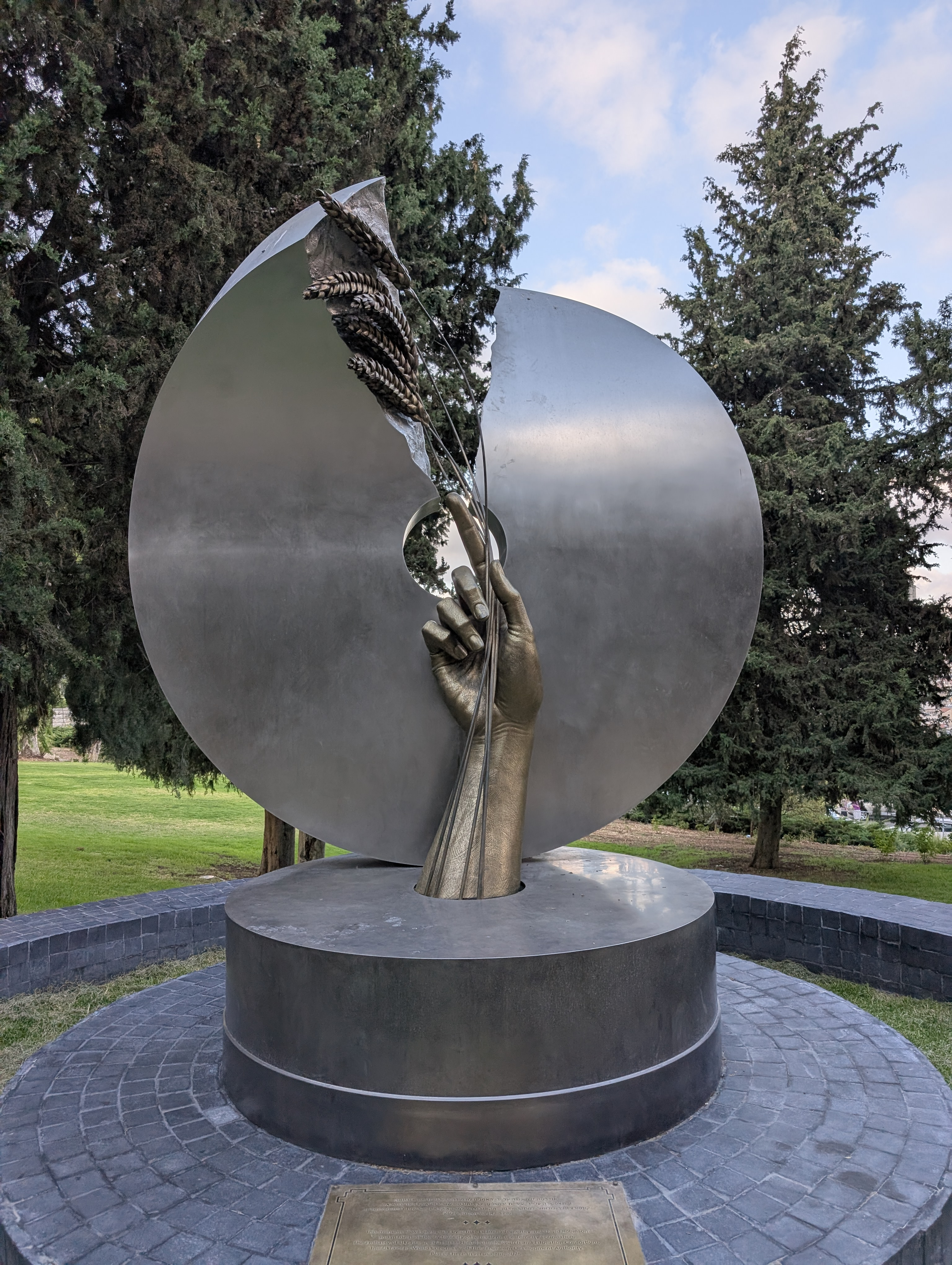
Holodomor memorial in Wohl Rose Park, Jerusalem, erected in April 2025

In February 2025, Israel joined Russia and the United States in voting against a UN General Assembly resolution reaffirming Ukraine's territorial integrity. Israeli Foreign Minister Gideon Sa'ar justified the vote by saying it was aimed to "give a chance to the initiative of America to try to end the Russo-Ukrainian War and solve it by peaceful means".

In early 2025, 90 Patriot air defense interceptors were transferred from Israel to Ukraine by the United States. Israeli officials denied they were supplying weapons to Ukraine but had only returned the system to the US. Axios reported Netanyahu had approved their transfer in September 2024 in return for allowing ultra-Orthodox Israelis to make the annual pilgrimage to the city of Uman in Ukraine. In June 2025, the Foreign Ministry of Israel denied providing Patriot air defense systems to Ukraine, contradicting an earlier suggestion by its envoy in Kyiv. In September 2025, Ukrainian President Volodymyr Zelenskyy confirmed that Israel had supplied Ukraine with a Patriot air defense battery, which was already installed and operational. Israel officially continued to deny it had supplied Ukraine with any sort of Patriot air defense. It claimed that it had merely returned the Patriot air defense systems to the US after retiring them from service.

In April 2026, Israel allowed a Russian ship carrying 43,500 metric tons of stolen Ukrainian wheat to unload in Haifa, despite protest from Ukraine's government.

In May 2026, Israel's Foreign Ministry and the Yad Vashem Holocaust memorial centre objects to Ukrainian military and political leader Andriy Melnyk being given a state burial, on the basis of his WWII collaboration with the Nazis.

=== Israeli-Palestinian conflict ===
In December 2016, Ukraine (as a non-permanent member of United Nations Security Council) voted in favor of resolution 2334, which condemned Israel's settlement policy in the West Bank. The Ukrainian Foreign Ministry considered the resolution balanced since it also urged the Palestinian side to combat terrorism. Ukraine's foreign ministry likened Israel's settlement of the West Bank to the Russian occupation of Crimea. In reaction, Israel cancelled a planned visit of the Ukrainian prime minister.

In November 2022, Ukraine supported a UN resolution that asked the International Court of Justice to investigate Israel's "prolonged occupation, settlement and annexation of Palestinian territory". In response, Israel summoned and admonished the Ukrainian ambassador. Then, in "an apparent act of retaliation", Israel did not support a UN resolution calling on Russia to pay reparations for invading Ukraine.

When Hamas attacked Israel in October 2023, President Zelenskyy offered condolences for the hundreds of civilian deaths and expressed solidarity with Israelis. Al Arabiya noted that Ukraine had been seeking Israeli air defense expertise to stop Russian missiles. Following the Al-Ahli Arab Hospital explosion on 17 October 2023, Ukraine's Foreign Ministry condemned attacks on civilians in Gaza, called on all sides to abide by international humanitarian law, and supported a two-state solution to the conflict.

In June 2024, President Zelenskyy, at the Shangri-La Dialogue, affirmed Ukraine's support for the two-state solution and recognition of the State of Palestine. He called for an end to Israel's war against Gaza, for Israel to respect international law, and emphasized that Ukraine is ready to provide humanitarian aid to Gaza. In July 2024, Ukraine sent 1,000 tons of wheat flour to the Palestinian territories. Ukraine's foreign ministry said the aid would support more than 100,000 Palestinian families for a month. It is part of the 'Grain from Ukraine' initiative to Palestine launched by President Zelenskyy.

Ukraine's government condemned the 9 September 2025 Israeli attack on Doha, which targeted Hamas officials. Ukraine's foreign ministry said the strike "on a densely populated area" was "on the territory of a state acting as mediator in the Gaza peace negotiations" and called it a "gross violation of international law".

== Economic relations ==
In 2012, the bilateral trade turnover between the countries was 1.3 billion dollars, a growth of 49.1% in comparison to 2011. The total export of Ukraine was 922.5 million dollars (796.4 in products and 126.1 in services). The import reached the amount of 364.2 million dollars (266.8 in goods and 97.4 in services). The main exports from Ukraine to Israel in 2012 were: grain (50.6%), non-precious metal (18.2%), aircraft (6.9%), food industry byproducts (5.8%), oil seeds and oleaginous fruits (3.3%), fats and oils of animal or vegetable origin (1.5%), electrical machinery (1.2%), nuclear reactors, boilers, machinery (1.1%). The main Israeli imports to Ukraine in 2012 were: mineral fuels, mineral oils and products of their distillation (42.4%), various chemical products (9.0%), plastics (7.0%), goods purchased in ports (5.5%), pharmaceutical products (4.8%), electrical machinery (4.4%), nuclear reactors, boilers, machinery (4.1%), fruits and nuts (3.1%), optical: photographic equipment (2.2%), soap: organic surface-active substances (1.9%), synthetic or artificial (1.7%), vegetables (1.6%), essential oils (1.5%).

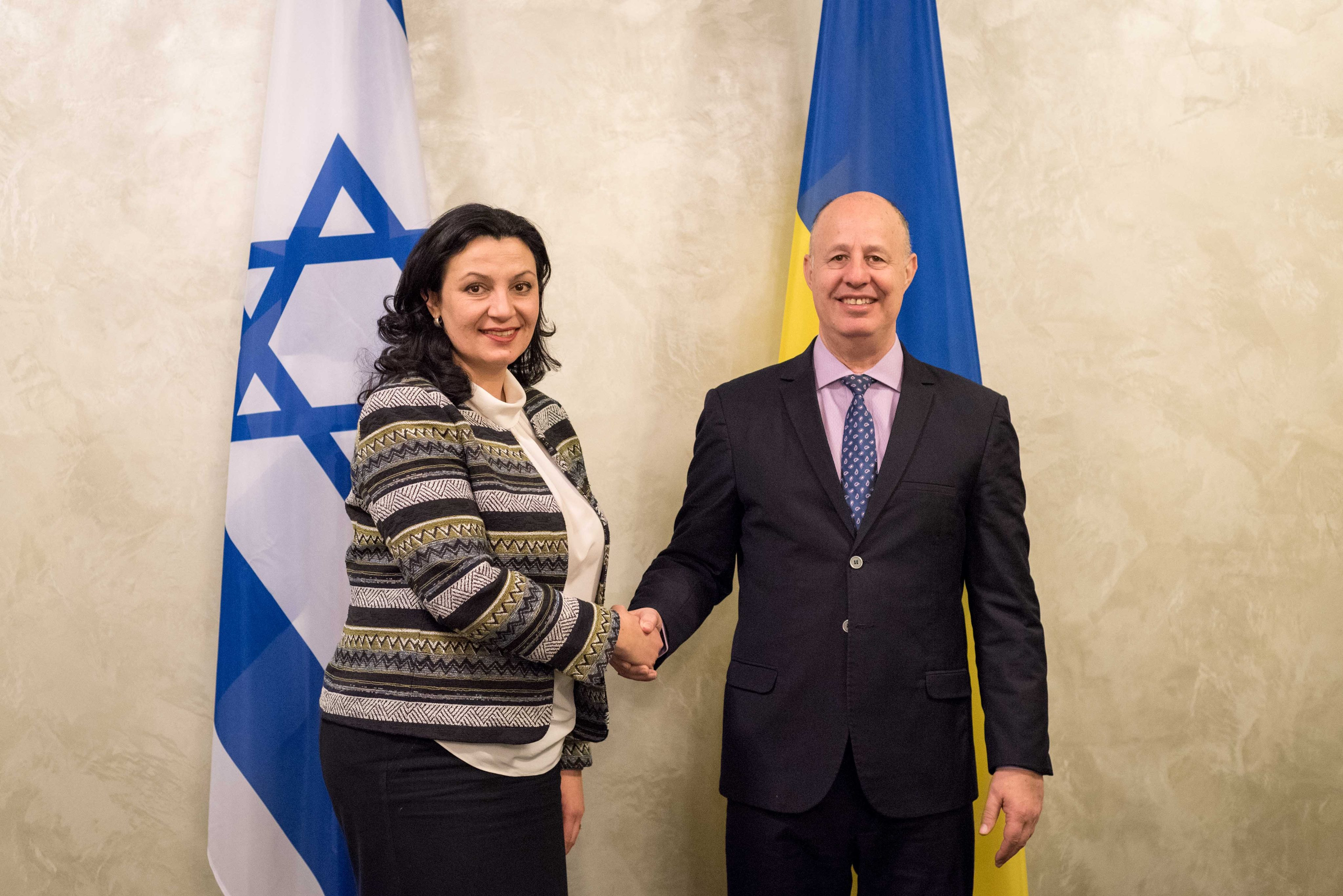
Vice Prime Minister for European and Euro-Atlantic Integration of Ukraine Ivanna Klympush-Tsintsadze with Minister for Regional Cooperation of the State of Israel Tzachi Hanegbi, 2018

Israel Foreign Trade Administration at the Ministry of Economy operates an Economic & Trade Mission in Kyiv. Its main goal is the promotion of trade and export by assisting Israeli industry expanding in the Ukrainian market, supporting individual exporters in marketing activity in Ukraine, attracting investment and expansion of strategic cooperation with Ukraine, improving knowledge of the Ukrainian business of Israeli industry and economy and helping in solving problems arising for Israeli companies operating in Ukraine. The economic attaché in Ukraine is Elizabeth Solovyov. Israel's honorary consul in western Ukraine, Oleg Vyshniakov, established an inter-ministerial committee for Ukrainian-Israeli trade and economic cooperation, as well as an economic business forum, which launched in November 2015 in Kyiv. Leading developers in the fields of Industry and Trade in Ukraine and Israel are taking part of this program.

Ukraine has been Israel's main wheat supplier for many years, accounting for almost half of the country's wheat consumption. As of 2022, Israel imports corn and corn products, barley, rapeseed and soybeans. Agricultural exports to Israel exceed $400 million a year.

Israel - Ukraine trade in millions USD-$
	Israel imports Ukraine exports	Ukraine imports Israel exports	Total trade value
2023	104.5	58.1	162.6
2022	129.3	78.4	207.7
2021	184.4	199	383.4
2020	153.3	134.7	288
2019	123.2	162.1	285.3
2018	106.6	166.9	273.5
2017	114.5	129.9	244.4
2016	107.8	160.9	268.7
2015	111.6	154.9	266.5
2014	108.6	298.8	407.4
2013	176.6	356.7	533.3
2012	214	294.3	508.3
2011	196.3	145.4	341.7
2010	139	111.1	250.1
2009	103.9	88.1	192
2008	201.5	195.1	396.6
2007	154.8	161.9	316.7
2006	170.5	128.3	298.8
2005	156.8	108.1	264.9
2004	172.4	97.4	269.8
2003	138.8	74.7	213.5
2002	110.3	69.7	180

== Travel and tourism ==
In July 2010 the foreign ministers of two countries signed an agreement of non visa traffic between Israel and Ukraine. This came into effect on 9 February 2011 and since then Ukrainians and Israelis may enter territory, travel through or stay on Ukraine or Israel without having to obtain visas for 90 days within a period of 180 days. Ukrainian President Petro Poroshenko stated in September 2016 that this visa-free regime had increased tourist flow between two countries tenfold.

In May 2015, two direct Lviv-Tel Aviv-Lviv flights a week were initiated, operated by Ukraine International Airlines.

Ukraine is an important destination for Jewish tourism, as many Jewish saints are buried there. Each year, on Rosh HaShanah, more than 40,000 Jewish tourists come to the city of Uman, in what is known as the Rosh Hashana kibbutz, this being a large source of revenue for the city.

Ukraine is associated with the Holocaust as the site of Babi Yar. A special tourism program for Jews and Israelis was developed in cooperation with the Lviv Municipality and the District Administration, includes visits to Jewish memorial sites and architecture, operated by Hebrew speaking tourist guides.

== Expatriate communities ==
Ukraine has one of the world's largest Jewish communities; estimates of its size vary widely, from at least 70,000 individuals up to 400,000 individuals.

== State visits ==
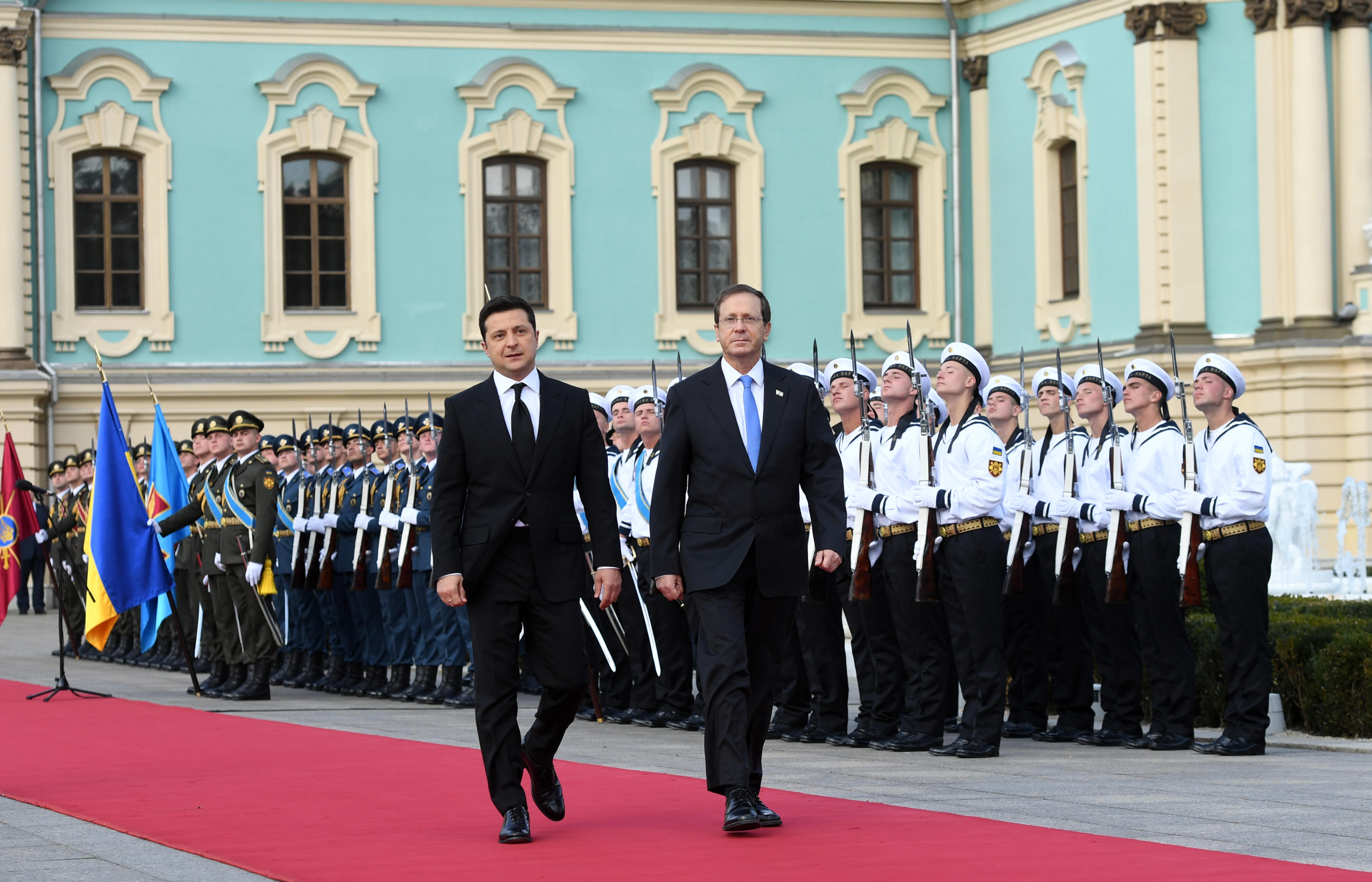
Isaac Herzog state visit to Ukraine, October 2021

Ukrainian President Petro Poroshenko paid a state visit to Israel on 22 December 2015, where he met with Israeli President Reuven Rivlin and Prime Minister Benjamin Netanyahu and addressed the Knesset. Rivlin visited Ukraine in September 2016.

In 2021, Israeli President Isaac Herzog paid a state visit to Ukraine. During the visit, Herzog, Ukrainian President Volodymyr Zelenskyy, German President Frank-Walter Steinmeier, and the Chief Rabbi of Kyiv Jonathan Markovitch attended the inauguration of a memorial to victims of Babyn Yar on the 80th anniversary of the Nazi massacre of 33,000 Jews in a ravine near Kyiv in September 1941.

== Notable incidents ==
- Siberia Airlines Flight 1812 – Ukrainian accidental attack on a civilian plane from Tel Aviv
- Dirar Abu Seesi abduction
- A ship docked in Haifa was supposedly transporting grain that had been stolen from Russian-occupied areas. Ukraine summoned Israeli ambassador Michael Brodsky to urge action.

== Popular opinion ==
=== Russo–Ukrainian war to Israelis ===
Following the Russian invasion of Ukraine, public opinion polls have found that 76% of Israelis support Ukraine in its war against Russia, including 90% on the political left and 68% on the political right. The Russo-Ukrainian war has become a major dividing point among Russians in Israel and also with Ukrainians in Israel. Many Russians, especially younger generations, tend to have more sympathy for Ukraine, while some other Russians tend to agree with talking points from Vladimir Putin. Additionally, some supporters of Ukraine have expressed discontent towards the silence from the Israeli government regarding the humanitarian disaster caused by the destruction of the Kakhovka Dam, and also that non-Jewish Ukrainian refugees who fled to Israel as part of Operation Israel Guarantees were not given refugee status, but only as "humanitarian tourists", and therefore could not legally work and must rely on state-provided basic healthcare and education.

=== Gaza war to Ukrainians ===
The Kyiv International Institute of Sociology (KIIS) conducted a nationwide public opinion survey from 29 November to 9 December 2023, to gauge Ukrainian sentiments regarding the Israeli–Palestinian conflict. The survey interviewed 1,031 adults from all regions of Ukraine, excluding Crimea and certain districts of Donetsk and Luhansk oblasts. Respondents could choose from three options. The survey found that 69% "sympathize more with Israel", 1% "sympathize more with Palestine", and 18% "sympathize with both sides equally". A further 12% found it difficult to express a clear preference. The choice to sympathize with neither was not an option. The survey also analyzed the opinions from a regional perspective, covering the West, Center, South, and East regions of Ukraine.

"Which side of the Israeli-Palestinian conflict do you sympathize with more?"

- Israel
- Palestine
- Both sides equally
- Difficult to say

== See also ==
- Foreign relations of Israel
- Foreign relations of Ukraine
- History of the Jews in Ukraine
- List of Ukrainian Jews
- Israel–Russia relations
- Palestine–Ukraine relations
