= Hani Mahmassani =

Lebanese-American engineer (1956–2025)

- هاني محمصاني
- Born: 6 January 1956
- Died: 15 July 2025 (aged 69)
- Occupations: Engineer; educator: William A. Patterson Distinguished Chair in Transportation

Academic background
- Education: Purdue University, MS (1978) Massachusetts Institute of Technology, PhD (1982)
- Doctoral advisor: Yossi Sheffi

Academic work
- Main interests: Traffic flow theory

Hani S. Mahmassani (6 January 1956 – 15 July 2025) was a Lebanese-American engineer who was the William A. Patterson Distinguished Chair in Transportation at Northwestern University and the Directory at the Northwestern University Transportation Center (NUTC). He held joint appointments in Industrial Engineering and Management Sciences at the Robert R. McCormick School of Engineering and Applied Science and in Managerial Economics and Decision Sciences at the Kellogg School of Management. He is widely regarded as one of the most influential figures in modern transportation engineering and was elected into the National Academy of Engineering in 2021 for his contributions to modeling of intelligent transportation networks and to interdisciplinary collaboration in transportation engineering.

Mahmassani received his MS from Purdue University in 1978 (advisor: Kumares C. Sinha) and his PhD from Massachusetts Institute of Technology in 1982 (advisor: Yossi Sheffi).

== Life and work ==
Hani Mahmassani served as the director of the Northwestern University Transportation Center since 2008. He was the Charles Irish Sr. Chair in Civil and Environmental Engineering at the University of Maryland, College Park from 2002 to 2007 and was also the director of the Advanced Institute for Transportation Infrastructure Engineering and Management at the University of Texas at Austin.

He worked closely with several notable industries and institutions, such as Booz Allen Hamilton, Cambridge Systematics, and Uber. He was also the associate editor (founding) of Transportation Research Part C, the associate editor (founding) of the Institute of Electrical and Electronics Engineers Transactions on Intelligent Transportation Systems, editor-in-chief of Transportation Science, and served on the editorial board of numerous prestigious and selective journals in the domain of Transportation engineering.

Mahmassani's research domain was quite broad, but his main areas of expertise were transportation systems engineering that leverage simulation, optimization models and algorithms, statistical methods, econometrics, and big data analysis. His most notable works are in defining the field of Dynamic network modeling and his contributions to Intelligent transportation systems, including the creation of Dynamic Network Assignment-Simulation Model for Advanced Road Telematics (DYNASMART).

Mahmassani died on 15 July 2025, at the age of 69.
