= Comparisons between the Gaza war and the Russo-Ukrainian war =

The flag of Palestine and the flag of Ukraine overlapped onto one another.

Since the outbreak of the Gaza war following the Hamas-led October 7 attacks against Israel, the War has been frequently compared to the Russo-Ukrainian war that significantly escalated with the full-scale 2022 Russian invasion of Ukraine. According to Hosoya Yuichi of Keio University, "these conflicts are linked in the public consciousness as symbols of our fractured world."

== Overview ==
Writing in Euromaidan Press, analyst and former Norwegian military officer Hans Petter Midttun has argued that the Gaza War and the Russo-Ukrainian war have six common characteristics:

1. Both being simmering conflicts that began years before their significant escalations in 2022 and 2023;
2. Both surprising many international observers despite a wide range of warnings indicating that the conflicts would escalate;
3. Both being marked by nations fighting for their right to exist in asymmetrical conflicts;
4. Both being marked by widespread violence against civilians;
5. Both being marked by involvement of the Axis of Upheaval, particularly the Islamic Republic of Iran;
6. Both being marked by the international community failing to prevent the conflicts and to be proactive in responding to developments in the conflicts.

Robin Luckham of the Institute of Development Studies published a book titled War and Peace in Ukraine and in Gaza in 2025, in which he argued that "the two wars belong within and reinforce wider transformations in the global order. They not only intertwine but also are comparable in significant respects," noting parallels such as:

1. Roots in the historical collapse of empires;
2. Colonial wars where states attempt to seize territory and erase other nations;
3. Signifincant ethnonationalist and religious components;
4. Dominance of war hawks in the political discources of the parties involved;
5. A global trend towards garrison states;
6. Asymmetric warfare;
7. The presence of highly developed local military industries;
8. A relative lack of interest in peace negotiations among the parties involved;
9. Ongoing cases in the International Criminal Court.

Marc Finaud of the Geneva Centre for Security Policy has listed a number of parallels, including:

1. An instrumentalisation of history;
2. A trend towards dehumanising the opposing side in the conflict;
3. Significant violations of international law;
4. Asymmetric warfare leading to high civilian casualties;
5. An impact on regional security extending beyond the directs of the wars;
6. The failure of peace efforts to find a long-lasting solution.

Michael Mandelbaum of the School of Advanced International Studies has argued that "in fundamental ways the two countries are waging the same war," listing several parallels:

1. Both conflicts began with acts of aggression against internationally recognised states;
2. Both conflicts involve wars of existential self-defence against aggressors that aim to eliminate the other nation;
3. Both wars involve democracies defending themselves against authoritarian regimes;
4. Significant violations of international law and attacks on civilians;
5. Both conflicts involve aggressors that aim to establish regional anti-Western hegemonies;
6. Both conflicts involve regions that are of significant geopolitical significance for the United States and the West;
7. Both conflicts have involved nations receiving significant support from the United States without direct American involvement in the war.

== Geopolitics ==
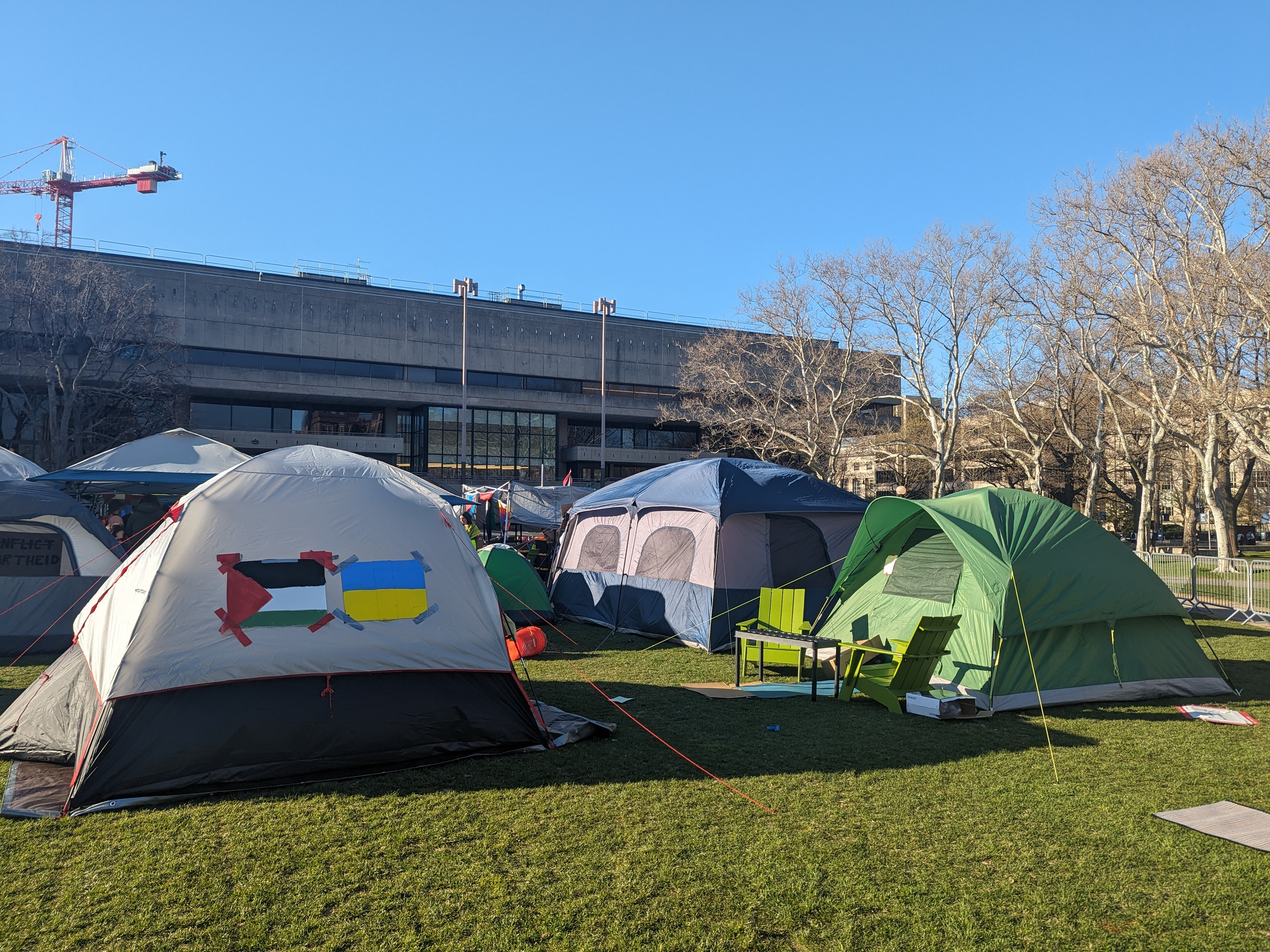
Gaza solidarity encampment at the Massachusetts Institute of Technology (MIT), April 2024; one of the tents has the flags of both Palestine and Ukraine taped onto it.

Emily Ferris of the Royal United Services Institute has argued that "the two wars currently dominating the agenda – the Ukraine war and the Israel–Gaza conflict – have one common denominator: Russia."

Scholar Oona A. Hathaway has argued that both the Gaza War and the Russo-Ukrainian war are recent examples of a series of conflicts since 9/11 "that have chipped away at protections for civilians."

Some commentators have argued that the Gaza War has distracted from the Russo-Ukrainian war. John Raine of the International Institute for Strategic Studies has argued that "the Gaza war has fuelled geopolitical trends that compromise Kyiv’s position and with which Ukrainian President Volodymyr Zelenskyy must contend if Ukraine is to survive." Zelenskyy has also explicitly stated that "it's clear that the war in the Middle East is taking away the focus." Other commentators have argued that both conflicts together have been the focus of selective attention by the international community, distracting from other ongoing conflicts such as the Sudanese civil war, the Myanmar civil war, and the War against the Islamic State.

=== Military ===
Omar Ashour of the Doha Institute for Graduate Studies has noted that the October 7 attacks "mimicked several techniques and tactics seen in Ukraine, ranging from unmanned quadcopters dropping improvised explosive devices (IEDs) on fortifications and sentry positions to terrorism tactics committed by Russian regular and irregular forces."

=== Media and social media ===
According to Robert Dover of the University of Hull, both conflicts "have become key battlegrounds in an information war that goes far wider than their tightly drawn physical borders. Carefully crafted social media posts and other online propaganda are fighting to make people around the world take sides, harden their positions and even move broader public opinion."

According to Nicholas Evans of the University of Tasmania, social media app Telegram saw widespread dissemination of antisemitic conspiracy theories linking the Gaza War to the Russo-Ukrainian war.

Some Palestinians have claimed that international media have displayed a double standard in their reporting on the two wars.

== Public opinion in associated countries ==
=== Russo-Ukrainian war to Israelis ===
Following the 2022 Russian invasion of Ukraine, public opinion polls found that 76% of Israelis supported Ukraine in its war against Russia, including 90% on the political left and 68% on the political right. By July 2023, the Russo-Ukrainian war became a major dividing point among Russians in Israel and also with Ukrainians in Israel. Many Russians, especially younger generations, tend to have more sympathy for Ukraine, while some other Russians tend to agree with talking points from Vladimir Putin. Additionally, some supporters of Ukraine expressed discontent towards the silence from the Israeli government regarding the humanitarian disaster caused by the destruction of the Kakhovka Dam, and also that non-Jewish Ukrainian refugees who fled to Israel as part of Operation Israel Guarantees were not given refugee status, but only as "humanitarian tourists", and therefore could not legally work and must rely on state-provided basic healthcare and education.

=== Russo-Ukrainian war to Palestinians ===
In a poll conducted by the Palestinian Center for Policy and Survey Research (PCPSR) on June 2022, Palestinian public opinion was divided about the Russo-Ukrainian war; 42% blamed Russia for starting the war, while 35% blamed Ukraine. Although some wanted the Palestinian Authority (PA) to support either Russia or Ukraine (14% and 6% respectively), the vast majority of those polled (75%) wanted the PA to stay neutral.

In another PCPSR poll conducted between 28 September–8 October 2023 (shortly before the beginning of the Gaza war), an overwhelming majority of Palestinians in both the Gaza Strip and the West Bank (70%) said they opposed the Russian invasion of Ukraine.

"To what extent do you approve or disapprove of Russia's invasion of Ukraine?" (28 September–8 October 2023)

- Approve
- Oppose
- Don't know

=== Gaza war to Ukrainians ===
The Kyiv International Institute of Sociology (KIIS) conducted a nationwide public opinion survey from 29 November to 9 December 2023, to gauge Ukrainian sentiments regarding the Israeli–Palestinian conflict. The survey interviewed 1,031 adults from all regions of Ukraine, excluding Crimea and certain districts of Donetsk and Luhansk oblasts. Respondents could choose from three options. The survey found that 69% "sympathize more with Israel", 1% "sympathize more with Palestine", and 18% "sympathize with both sides equally". A further 12% found it difficult to express a clear preference. The choice to sympathize with neither was not an option. The survey also analyzed the opinions from a regional perspective, covering the West, Center, South, and East regions of Ukraine.

"Which side of the Israeli-Palestinian conflict do you sympathize with more?" (December 2023)

- Israel
- Palestine
- Both sides equally
- Difficult to say

== Criticism of comparisons ==
Some commentators have criticised comparisons between the two conflicts. Writing in the Algemeiner Journal, Sabine Sterk has argued that comparisons between the two wars are "not only inaccurate — but dangerously misleading," saying that "Ukraine fights for sovereignty; Russia fights to reassert empire. While civilians suffer on both sides, it is still a conflict between two state actors. Israel’s war is not like that. Israel does not seek to occupy Gaza, nor to eliminate the Palestinian people. It seeks to dismantle a terrorist regime embedded in civilian infrastructure, using its own people as human shields."

Criticisms of comparisons between the conflicts also occurred before the outbreak of the Gaza War in 2023. Alan Baker of the Jerusalem Center for Security and Foreign Affairs has argued in 2022 that comparisons between the Russo-Ukrainian war and the Israeli-Palestinian conflict are "manipulative propaganda principally aimed at vilifying Israel," saying that comparisons were driven by fears that the Russo-Ukrainian war would overshadow the Israeli-Palestinian conflict and would lead the international community "to realize the utter transparency and hollowness of its long and tedious preoccupation with Israel."

== See also ==
- Palestine–Ukraine relations
