= Pro-Palestine protests at the Massachusetts Institute of Technology =

2023–present MIT protest movement

MIT Gaza Genocide Protests
- Part of Gaza war protests (in the US • at universities (in 2024 (in the US)))
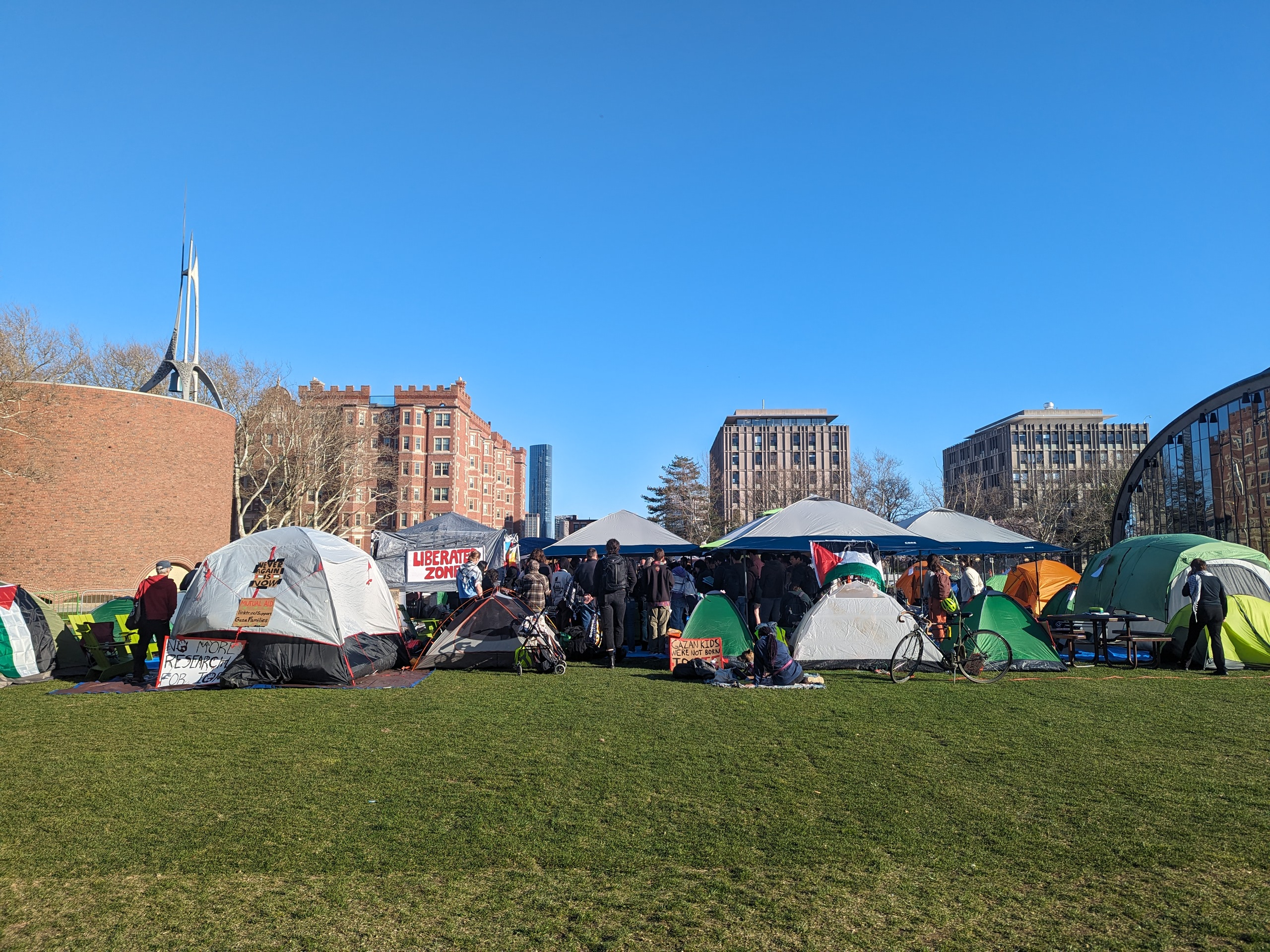
- A scene from the Scientists Against Genocide Encampment, April 23, 2024
- Date: October 7, 2023 – present
- Location: Massachusetts Institute of Technology (MIT), Cambridge, MA; 42.3584°N 71.0947°W
- Caused by: Gaza genocide; opposition to MIT's research ties to Israeli military and arms suppliers.
- Goals: MIT's divestment from Israel; establish ethical funding criteria; solidarity with the oppressed
- Methods: Protests; Occupation; Civil disobedience; Picketing
- Result: Elbit Systems and Lockheed Martin partially sever ties with MIT.; bans of Coalition Against Apartheid and edition of Written Revolution; suspensions, expulsions, and arrests; MIT laboratories maintain research contracts with Israeli Ministry of Defense; protests continue

Parties
Pro-Palestinian groups: MIT Coalition for Palestine: Coalition Against Apartheid; Palestine at MIT; Jews for Collective Liberation; Black Student Union; Arab Student Organization; MIT Divest; MIT Latino Cultural Center; And 13 more.; Supporting groups: Palestinian Youth Movement; BDS Boston; Jewish Voice for Peace; United Electric local 256; Party for Socialism and Liberation; IfNotNow; Democratic Socialists of America; Massachusetts Peace Action; Students for Justice in Palestine	MIT Corporation MIT administration Supporting groups: MIT Police; Cambridge Police; Pro-Israel counter-protesters: MIT Israel Alliance; MIT Jewish Alumni Alliance; Israeli consulate in Boston; StandWithUs; Smaller formations; Supporting groups: Israeli Ministry of Strategic Affairs; MIT-Kalaniyot program

Lead figures
No centralized leadership	Sally Kornbluth; Mark Gorenberg; Cynthia Barnhart; Melissa Nobles

Casualties and losses
138 discipline cases; 125+ doxing cases; 38 probations; 25 suspensions; 24 arrests	

Students at the Massachusetts Institute of Technology held walkouts, vigils, teach-ins, protests, sit-ins, and hacks during the Gaza genocide demanding MIT end research ties to the Israeli military and its weapon providers. This period of mobilization escalated to an encampment in April-May 2024 following peers at Columbia University. Led by the MIT Coalition Against Apartheid and Coalition for Palestine representing more than 15 campus groups, protesters represented the majority call of the student body but were met with hostility from the university's administration and Zionist actors, which characterized the students as violent and antisemitic. By 2 September 2025, 138 discipline cases had been opened, 38 students were placed on probation, 24 were arrested, 25 suspended, and the Coalition Against Apartheid permanently banned.

The Scientists Against Genocide Encampment at MIT was one among the Gaza war protests on university campuses and in the US. It was destroyed by riot police on May 9, 2024 at the direction of MIT president Sally Kornbluth. Mobilization continued into the next year. Protesters framed their demands as consistent with scientific research ethics, international law, and past MIT divestment decisions on Jeffrey Epstein, Darfur genocide, Russian invasion of Ukraine, and assassination of Jamal Khashoggi. In July, U.N. Special Rapporteur Francesca Albanese identified the school for conducting "weapons and surveillance research funded by the Israeli ministry of defense — the only foreign military financing research at the institute." However MIT officials claimed that ending Israel-linked research projects would violate academic freedom.

In response to student action, MIT took offline its annual reports on sponsored research and restricted access to grant data, saying it would not release that data going forward. In May 2025, the class president was barred from graduation ceremony after giving a speech in favor of divestment. Despite failing to win institutional change, student protesters have taken credit for decisions by Israeli arms providers Lockheed Martin and Elbit Systems to leave MIT programs. Students and faculty also launched a mutual aid network and online course program for students in the Gaza Strip.

== Protester demands ==
Protesters accuse MIT of complicity in mass starvation, ethnic cleansing, apartheid, war crimes, and genocide perpetrated by Israeli government against Palestinians. Following revelations that MIT laboratories had research funding contracts sponsored by the Israeli Ministry of Defense, their campaign centered on the following demands:

- End all MIT research sponsorships sponsored by the Israeli Ministry of Defense and offer transitional funding to affected students.
- Adopt an ethical funding criteria to reject grants from any external sponsor engaged in human rights violations.
- Sever MIT's institutional ties to arms providers to the Israeli government, such as Lockheed Martin, Elbit Systems, and Maersk.

These demands developed popular support among students. In March 2024, MIT undergraduates voted by 64% in a campus-wide referendum sponsored by the Undergraduate Association to call for a ceasefire in Gaza and cut all research and financial ties with the Israeli military. In April, 942 members of the 7,700-member MIT Graduate Student Union (United Electric 256) voted by 71% in favor of a similar resolution. Over spring 2024, thousands signed the “No Science for Apartheid” pledge. Two resolutions in the Graduate Student Council passed in December 2024 and February 2025 calling for the Israeli military to be barred from sponsoring MIT research and that MIT adopt ethical funding criteria.

== Composition ==
The campus movement at MIT was a rainbow coalition, composed of students from Arab, Jewish, Black, White, Desi, Latino, Asian and other backgrounds. In October 2023, over 15 groups formed the MIT Coalition for Palestine, which grew to include:

- MIT Alumni for Palestine (A4P)
- MIT Arab Student Organization (ASO)
- MIT Asian American Initiative (AAI)
- MIT Black Graduate Student Association (BGSA)
- MIT Black Students’ Union (BSU)
- MIT Disability Justice Collective (DJC)
- MIT Coalition Against Apartheid (CAA)
- MIT Divest
- MIT DUSP for Palestinian Liberation (D4PL)
- MIT Faculty and Staff for Palestine (FS4P)
- MIT Globally Indigenous Students for Justice (IS4J)
- MIT Grads for Palestine (G4P)
- MIT Jews for Collective Liberation (JCL)
- MIT Latino Cultural Center (LCC)
- MIT Muslims for Justice (M4J)
- MIT Reading for Revolution (R4R)
- MIT Taara
- Palestine@MIT (Pal@MIT)
- MIT Written Revolution
- Trans@MIT

Local activist groups such as Palestinian Youth Movement, Jewish Voice for Peace, IfNotNow, Party for Socialism and Liberation, Democratic Socialists of America, Massachusetts Peace Action, BDS Boston and the Boston Coalition were also present at MIT protests.

Formations of pro-Israel counter-protesters, including the MIT Israel Alliance were generally much smaller, with the exception of a May 3, 2024 protest sponsored by the Israeli consulate in Boston.

== Reactions ==
=== Reactions from supporters ===
In addition to majority student votes behind the protest demands, MIT protests and those on campuses elsewhere attracted significant attention from people in Gaza as well as progressive and left-wing elements in the United States and the world. Massachusetts state lawmakers Erika Uyterhoeven and Mike Connolly attended MIT encampment protests and American politicians Ayanna Pressley, Rashida Tlaib, and Bernie Sanders issued statements in support of general student protester goals. On issues of the right to protest and due process, student activists do receive support from some professors, local civil society and activist networks, and organized labor within the university sector.

Internationally, the 83-page MIT Science for Genocide report released by the Coalition research team was translated into three other languages and news of MIT complicity was covered in several foreign-language news outlets. UN Special Rapporteurs have also cited MIT as an example of institutional complicity in the genocide in Gaza and have raised concerns over fair treatment and discrimination of student protesters.

=== Reactions from weapon firms ===
Despite failure to win institutional commitment to divest, the MIT Coalition for Palestine has taken credit for decisions by third parties to end MIT engagements. In late 2024, protesters declared the MISTI-Israel program had ended its seed fund program with Lockheed Martin, and the contract would not be renewed. MIT officials responded saying the fund simply expired at the end of its cycle. At the 2024 MIT Fall Career Fair, Lockheed Martin recruiters left hours early after being disrupted by protesters and did not return the next year.

In May 2025, the Coalition and its partner group BDS Boston announced that the Israeli weapons firm Elbit Systems had ended its engagement in the MIT Industrial Liaison Program. An Israeli military grant for an MIT laboratory was also canceled in August 2025 after student and community pushback. However MIT programs with Israel Aerospace Industries, Caterpillar, Maersk and other arms providers to the Israeli military continue, and protesters say that Israeli military grants continue to be approved.

=== Reactions from pro-Israel supporters ===
Pro-Israel supporters claim that student protests at MIT are violent, antisemitic toward Jews, glorify rape, and make them feel unsafe. One MIT post-doc told said he had taken his child out of daycare and that he felt "terrified" of the protesters, although he was later seen in the encampment. MIT's pro-Israel community have called for MIT president Sally Kornbluth to resign and for protesting students to be expelled and deported. MIT students have met with Israeli prime minister Benjamin Netanyahu, who condemned his alma mater MIT in Congress. At the invitation of Republican lawmakers, MIT pro-Israel students have also testified in Congress alleging anti-semitic incidents on campus that target Jews, although other Jewish students have dismissed that testimony as sensationalist moral panic or an example of the Palestine exception to free speech.

A lawsuit filed against MIT by the Brandeis Center (unaffiliated with Brandeis University) alleging anti-semitic discrimination against Jews is ongoing. A similar suit against MIT filed by StandWithUs was dismissed in July 2024. An MIT professor Yossi Sheffi wrote in MIT's Faculty Newsletter that anti-Zionist students "are not entitled to detailed information on faculty projects" and should "go fly a kite." Another faculty member, now appointee in the Trump administration Retsef Levi accused Arab students of harboring a "terror cell" and attempted to involve the FBI. Other faculty and donors have started an MIT post-doc program called Kalaniyot for Israeli nationals as a means to counter the BDS movement on campus; it has since spread to Columbia University, Dartmouth, and Harvard. Republican Speaker of the House Mike Johnson also condemned MIT activists, calling the class president “Ignorant. Hateful. Morally bankrupt.”

=== Reactions from MIT administration ===
MIT officials declined to reach an agreement with student negotiatiors and instead pursued action to limit protests and mass student mobilization. In February 2024, president Sally Kornbluth permanently banned the Coalition Against Apartheid; its website was shut-down, and more than a dozen student organizers were formally sanctioned. The Hillel International CEO took credit for the suspension, telling a Knesset committee in Israel, "We are changing administrations."

Early attempts by encampment leaders to negotiate with MIT were fruitless: a written proposal by the Coalition for MIT to reject "any current and future direct or indirect influences of the Ministry of Defense of Israel on research projects at MIT" in exchange to end the encampment was dismissed by MIT officials, who said that they will not "compromise the academic freedom of our faculty" and that rule-breakers will face “disciplinary action.” Officials reportedly offered a small modification to MIT’s grant review process; this was rejected and a follow-up proposal by the students on April 28 was also rejected, with the MIT Chancellor Melissa Nobles later writing that to "unilaterally terminate active research agreements" with the Israeli Ministry of Defense would "be an encroachment on the academic freedom" of faculty members. Students replied that MIT already limits research engagements with other foreign governments.

On May 3rd, MIT police constructed a ring of fences and a checkpoint to enclose the encampment in anticipation of a rally at MIT sponsored by the Israeli consulate and local Zionist groups. On May 6, students were given an ultimatum to leave Kresge Oval or be suspended. They did not, and the crowd eventually pushed down the barricades. On May 10, the encampment was destroyed. Dozens of students were arrested, evicted and suspended, some for blocking a building that housed laboratories sponsored by the Israeli military. Protests continued at the MIT President's House, graduation, and Lobby 7 steps.

By fall 2024, MIT restrictions on flyering, posters, tabling, vigils, and demonstrations were tightened. From August to November 2024, police arrested five people at MIT protests; several more were disciplined for questioning Lockheed Martin recruiters at a career fair. In November, an edition of the student publication Written Revolution was banned from campus for an article discussing pacifism and diversity of tactics. The author and chief editor Prahlad Iyengar was then suspended for one year and banned from campus. In May 2025, the MIT class president Megha Vemuri was barred from graduation ceremonies for giving a graduation speech on the Gaza genocide and divestment. An MIT linguistics professor Michel DeGraff was also barred from teaching a course involving Palestine.

During the summer of 2025, MIT removed student access from tools that track research funding sources, such as annual reports on external research sponsorship and grant-tracking software Kuali Coeus. After an article in The Tech student newspaper criticized lab director Daniela Rus, she successfully put pressure on the paper to retract, and in the face of criticism has been "firmly" backed by the MIT administration. The MIT president has also publicly condemned vandalism and anti-Israel speech, although according to Coalition groups she has failed to name and condemn genocide in Gaza.

== See also ==
- 2024 pro-Palestinian protests on university campuses
- International reactions to the Gaza war
- Gaza war protests in the United States
- Boycott, Divestment and Sanctions
- Student activism
- Project Esther
