= Leipzig: The Battle of Nations =

Board wargame

Cover of the 2nd edition box, 1972

Leipzig: The Battle of Nations, subtitled "Napoleon vs. Europe", is a board wargame published by Simulations Publications Inc. (SPI) in 1969 that simulates the 1813 campaign of Napoleon in central Europe, including the Battle of Leipzig. The game was one of the first Napoleonic board wargames, and a number of innovative rules such as the effect of individual leaders on combat were adopted by other wargame publishers.

== Background ==
Following Napoleon's disastrous campaign in Russia during 1812 which destroyed his Grande Armée, the European powers opposing him (the Sixth Coalition) felt that the time was ripe to move against France. Napoleon, in an attempt to counter the Coalition with a rapid and decisive strike before they could effectively gather their forces, quickly rebuilt a new army from reservists, draft evaders and youth and marched them into the German states in the spring of 1813.

== Description ==
Leipzig is a two-player grand tactical wargame in which one player takes the role of Napoleon, and the other controls the Coalition.

=== Components ===
The original "Test Series" game was marketed in a plain envelope, and includes:

- 23" x 29" black & white paper hex grid map scaled at 15 km (9.5 mi) per hex
- a paper sheet of 255 counters (to be cut apart)
- rules sheet
- various charts and player aids

In the second edition boxed set published in 1972, the map is two-color, the counters are die-cut cardboard, and a small six-sided die is also included.

=== Gameplay ===
The game uses an alternating "I Go, You Go" system, with the following phases:

- Movement
- Attacker Supply Allocation
- Retreat Before Combat
- Defender Supply Allocation
- Combat Resolution

Once one player has completed these phases, the second player is given the same opportunity. This completes one game turn, which in turn represents two weeks of game time.

Leipzig introduced a number of innovative rules that were quickly adopted by other board wargame designers, including:

- diplomacy, which can attempt to bring Austria into the Alliance, or to cause a schism with France's allies
- breaking down a large unit into smaller units, or recombining smaller units into a larger unit
- supply
- forced marches
- leaders that give a unit or stack of units a bonus during combat. (Each side has ten leaders, with Combat Strength Bonuses ranging from 1 to 25.)
- cavalry screens
- fortresses and sieges
- partial and full zones of control

==== Scenarios ====
The game includes two historical scenarios: Spring 1813 (12 game turns); and Summer 1813 (11 game turns). These can be combined into a Campaign game that continues into Fall 1813 (35 turns). In addition, there are five non-historical "what if?" scenarios that change various factors.

== Publication history ==
In the late 1960s, Avalon Hill dominated the board wargame market, producing on average, one game per year with well-produced but expensive components. At the newly founded wargame publisher Poultroon Press (later SPI), Jim Dunnigan and his design team decided to go in the opposite direction, marketing a number of very cheaply made "test games" to prove that producing many games a year could also be a viable business model. These test games featured typewritten pages with hand-drawn maps and graphics and thin paper counter sheets, packaged in a plain envelope. Unlike Avalon Hill, which specialized in games of modern warfare or the American Civil War, SPI's first test game was Leipzig, a Napoleonic board wargame designed by Dunnigan in only a week, and published in 1969 despite the half-finished nature of the game.

In 1972, Dunnigan revised the "unfinished" rules to create the game he had originally envisioned; the second edition, with upgraded components designed by Redmond A. Simonsen, was released in a cardboard box with an illustrated cover, one of only three SPI games in 1972 to receive this treatment. (The other two were Normandy: The Invasion of Europe 1944, and Barbarossa: The Russo-German War 1941-45.) Although SPI sold several thousand copies of Leipzig, it wasn't enough to justify the cost of the expensive box, and for the next two years, subsequent SPI games were marketed in a plain white box with a red title ribbon.

Dunnigan used the rules from the second edition of Leipzig for two other Napoleonic games released in 1972, La Grande Armée, and 1812: The Campaign of Napoleon in Russia.

As newer games with better rules entered the market, Leipzig fell out of favor. and in a 1976 poll conducted by SPI to determine the most popular wargames in North America, Leipzig only placed 159th out of 202 games.

== Reception ==
In Issue 21 of Strategy & Tactics, Dave Williams complimented Leipzig, commenting that "it offers ideas for other strategic games in times when armies didn't have continuous fronts." Despite this, Williams concluded with reservations, saying, "The game, however, lacks something. It is probably too stylized. The mapboard is rather empty, the units are too abstracted. [...] It could have been so much better."

"In Issue 2 of Moves, although James Flanagan did not like the organization of the rules, which he called "a pain in the neck", and he only rated the game 3 out of 10 for excitement, he still concluded on a positive note, saying, "Leipzig is the kind of game we would never pass over. It is outstanding for the number of 'new' concepts it introduces. The situation is intriguing. The mechanics are innovative, and all in all, it is a rewarding investment."

In his 1977 book The Comprehensive Guide to Board Wargaming, Nicholas Palmer noted the various rules that gave flavor to the game, including "possibly Austrian neutrality, defection of Napoleonic allies, and great emphasis given to leader counters. The strategic problems of long campaigns are covered with rules on supply, regrouping and attrition en route."

== Other reviews and commentary ==
- Strategy & Tactics #5
- Fire & Movement #24
- Panzerfaust Vol.5 #6
