= 1812: The Campaign of Napoleon in Russia =

1972 Napoleonic wargame

- Designers: Phil Orbanes; John Young
- Illustrators: Redmond A. Simonsen
- Publishers: SPI
- Publication: 1972
- Genres: Napoleonic

1812: The Campaign of Napoleon in Russia is a collection of two board wargames published by Simulations Publications Inc. (SPI) in 1972 that both simulate Napoleon's disastrous invasion of Russia. One game uses a traditional hex grid map, and the other uses a map of areas and regions.

== Background ==
In June 1812, Napoleon's army invaded Russia and initially made deep inroads. By September, the French had forced the Russians back to the outskirts of Moscow, where Napoleon managed to win a Pyrrhic victory at the Battle of Borodino, suffering great losses but prying the road to Moscow open. Although the French briefly occupied Moscow, the oncoming winter and lack of supplies forced the French to immediately withdraw from Russia, with the subsequent loss of a significant portion of the French army to disease, cold and starvation.

== Description ==
1812: The Campaign of Napoleon in Russia is a two-player game in which one player acts as Napoleon, and the other player controls the Russian defenders.

=== Components ===
The hex grid game includes:

- 24 in × 34 in (61 cm × 86 cm) paper hex grid map scaled at 48 km (30 mi) per inch plus a 6.5 in × 11.5 in (17 cm × 29 cm) map extension
- 12-page map-folded rulesheet
- Terrain Effects chart

The area movement game includes:

- 22 in × 28 in (56 cm × 71 cm) area movement map scaled at 48 km (30 mi) per inch
- 8-page rule booklet

Both games share:

- 400 die-cut counters
- errata sheet (dated December 1973)
- small six-sided die

=== Gameplay ===
Although both games in 1812 have turns that represent 15 days of game time, each has a separate set of rules. Both come with three scenarios: two shorter ones that involve only part of the overall invasion, and one campaign game that covers the entire six months from the start of the invasion in June until the disastrous retreat in December.

==== Hex Grid game ====
The hex grid game uses a version of the "I Go, You Go" alternating turn rules originally designed for one of SPI's first games, Leipzig: The Battle of Nations (1969). There are also rules for forced marches, leaders, supply, attrition, retreat before combat, and fortresses.

==== Area movement game ====
The area movement game has a different set of rules that uses a matrix to determine both retreat and combat. There are also rules for leaders, fortresses, supply (and area depletion), forced march, and attrition. Reviewer Ian Chadwick noted that the supply rules are crucial in this game, since areas can be depleted of supplies, forcing armies to march around them, and pointed out that the canny Russian player "can engage in a 'scorched earth' policy to destroy supply potential for the French", possibly channelling the French into disadvantageous positions.

=== Victory conditions ===
Winning in both games depends upon accumulating victory points. In the area movement game, points are accumulated only for battle successes (1 point per victory), except that the Russians can also gain 5 extra points for the death of Napoleon. In the hex grid game, points are awarded for French control of fortresses and cities as well as the death of Napoleon.

== Publication history ==
1812 was designed by Phil Orbanes and John Young, with graphic design by Redmond A. Simonsen. It was published by SPI in 1972 in both a molded plastic "flat-pack" box and a regular cardboard box. It was not a popular game; as Nicholas Palmer noted, "The package failed to excite great interest."

== Reception ==
In his 1977 book The Comprehensive Guide to Board Wargaming, Nick Palmer called the double-game "One of the most ambitious projects from SPI." He thought the hex grid game was "a fairly conventional treatment at a 'grand tactical' level", while the area movement game "is a strategic game with large zones instead of hexes, and an innovative combat system."

In Moves #11, Martin Campion called the area movement game "innovative, valuable, fascinating" but found that ultimately "it does not quite work." He thought that the matrix system for retreat and combat was too rigid. He also felt that the longer campaign game was unbalanced in favor of the French, the shorter scenario that started with the French leaving Moscow was an easy win for the Russians, and only the second short scenario, in which the French are approaching Moscow, allowed both sides an even chance to win. Campion found the more traditional hex grid game "allows a little more freedom in forced marching than the strategic version and much more certainty in battles." In both games, Campion pointed out that the French player can use the supply rules in the longer campaign game to his advantage, saying, "So the game becomes a puzzle which can be solved by the French player while the Russian player either looks more or less helplessly on or tries a succession of desperate gambles in an effort to stop the process."

In Issue 52 of Moves, Ian Chadwick gave separate reviews for each game. He called the area movement game "The more enjoyable of the two — it is easier and faster to play, although it is lacking in historical flavor." He concluded that the area movement game was "a good game, if not particularly memorable. Play is not difficult, but the campaign game is rather long." For the hex grid game, Chadwick noted that the game might have more traditional game functions and greater depth, but that came at the cost of "correspondingly greater complexity." He called the hex grid version "a tough bloody game [...] a long, slow game, difficult for the French to win in the long run." Despite this, he called it "highly playable, and gives a fine insight into the campaign and the reasons for Napoleon's defeat." Chadwick noted in both games that it was often easy to determine a winner quite early in the game "by judging the state of the French army." Chadwick concluded by giving both games identical grades of "B" for playability, "B" for historical accuracy, and "C" for component quality.

== Other reviews and commentary ==
- Strategy & Tactics #35
- Fire & Movement #24
