= Oleg Vyshniakov =

Ukrainian businessman and public figure

- Олег Володимирович Вишняков (Ukrainian)
- Born: September 9, 1965 (age 60); Kyiv
- Citizenship: Ukraine
- Known for: Honorary Consul of the State of Israel in Western Ukraine
- Website: http://il-consul.com/en/honorary-consul Honorary Consul of the State of Israel in Western Ukraine

Oleg Vyshniakov (Ukrainian: Олег Володимирович Вишняков: Russian: Олег Владимирович Вишняков; Hebrew: אולג וישניאקוב; born 9 September 1965) is a Ukrainian businessman and a public figure, in office since November 2014 as the Ukrainian Honorary Consul of the State of Israel in the city of Lviv in Western Ukraine.

== Biography ==
Vyshniakov was born in Kyiv in Ukraine. In 1987 he completed his degree at the Technological Institute in Kaunas, Lithuania, in the field of engineering and technology, with an expertise in managing water resources and treatment of industrial wastewater. After his studies, he worked for three years in the local legal system, and since 1991, he is engaged in private entrepreneurship. He owns a number of commercial and entertainment centers, several supermarket chains and business centers in Ukraine, Latvia, Georgia and Poland. In November 2014, Vyshniakov was appointed as the Ukrainian Honorary Consul of the State of Israel in Western Ukraine, and in May 2015, the Honorary Israeli Consulate was founded in the city of Lviv.

== Part of his activities as Honorary Consul of the State of Israel in Western Ukraine ==
- Operating six training and enrichment programs for psychologists and care professionals, instructed by psychologists and rehabilitation experts from Israel, operating throughout the country, under the support of the Honorary Consul of the State of Israel in the city of Lviv, and in cooperation with the Embassy of Israel in Ukraine. As of August 2015, 200 Ukrainian psychologists have been trained through this program.
- Financial assistance to children in Ukraine, and helping the children of combatants who lost their lives or were wounded in combat zones. As part of this assistance, a delegation of 18 children from Lviv and its surroundings visited the rehabilitation center in Jerusalem.
- Launching direct flights between Lviv and Tel Aviv, operated by Ukraine International Airlines, with regular flights twice a week.
- Developing a special tourism program for Jews and Israelis, in cooperation with the Lviv Municipality and the District Administration, which includes visits to Jewish memorial site and architecture, operated by Hebrew speaking tourist guides.
- Appointment and establishment of an inter-ministerial committee for Ukrainian-Israeli trade and economic cooperation, as well as the establishment of an economic business forum, initiated by Vyshniakov, which shall be launched in November 2015 in Kiev. Leading developers in the fields of Industry and Trade in Ukraine and Israel will part of this program.
- Establishment of a cultural center, sponsored by the Honorary Consul of the State of Israel. The center holds exhibitions, concerts, shows, movies, meetings with public officials and Israeli culture, as well as workshops, all free of charge.
- Publishing a political science textbook, in cooperation with the Embassy of the State of Israel in Ukraine, on the basis of which there a special course is held at the University of Lviv.

== Additional public activities ==
Vyshniakov leads is an active participant in the life of the Jewish communities in Lviv, and organizes support programs and humanitarian aid to the needy, in collaboration with the Jewish Ukrainian charity founded "Hesed Aryeh", the Center for Jewish Culture "Shalom Aleichem", the Movement for Progressive Judaism "Teiva" as well as the united Jewish Community in Lviv, "Golden Rose". In addition, Vyshniakov initiates various activities to strengthen the historical and cultural heritage of the Ukrainian Jews and organizes a cooperation between the Jewish Agency and the Jewish Communities in Ukraine.
