= Palestine–Ukraine relations =

- Palestine: Ukraine

Palestine–Ukraine relations are bilateral relations between the State of Palestine and Ukraine. The Ukrainian Soviet Socialist Republic recognized Palestinian independence on 19 November 1988. Palestine recognized Ukraine as a sovereign state in February 1992. On 2 November 2001, the two countries established diplomatic relations and the Palestinian embassy opened the same day. Ukraine has supported UN resolutions against Israel's occupation of the Palestinian territories.

== Soviet Ukraine ==
The Ukrainian SSR voted in favor of the United Nations plan for the partition of Palestine in 1947. The Soviet Union later set up a university exchange programme to let Palestinian medical students study in Ukraine. Relationships started by participants in the programme led to the growth of a Ukrainian community in Palestine, growing to around 1500 Ukrainian Palestinians by the 2020s.

== Independent Ukraine ==
In April 1999, President Yasser Arafat visited Kyiv and met with President Leonid Kuchma. In January 2000, Leonid Kuchma, visited the West Bank to take part in the commemoration of the 2000th anniversary of Christianity in Bethlehem, and met with the leader of the Palestinian National Authority (PNA), Yasser Arafat. During an official visit by President Viktor Yushchenko to Palestine in November 2007, an agreement was reached with President Mahmoud Abbas to open a Ukrainian Mission to the PNA.

=== Russo-Ukrainian War ===
In November 2014, the Palestinian ambassador to Ukraine, Mohammed Qasem Al-Assad, said of the Palestinian approach to the conflict in eastern Ukraine: "We support the territorial integrity of Ukraine, and we believe that the Donbas was, is and will be a part of Ukraine".

The Palestinian Authority has not taken a public position on the Russian invasion of Ukraine. Abbas and most of the Palestinian leadership have elected to remain neutral on the conflict, as they "seek to keep having good relations with both parties". Ukrainian President Volodymyr Zelenskyy asked Israel for support, stating, "We intend to live, but our neighbors want to see us dead." In October 2023, protests in solidarity with Gaza were held in the city of Hebron, with Palestinian demonstrators waving Russian flags and posters bearing images of Russian president Vladimir Putin.

=== Israeli–Palestinian conflict ===
In December 2016, Ukraine as a non-permanent member of United Nations Security Council voted in favor of resolution 2334, which criticised Israel's settlement policy in the West Bank. Ukrainian Foreign Ministry considered the resolution's text balanced since it also urged the Palestinian side to adopt measures to counter terrorism. Ukraine's ambassador to the UN, Volodymyr Yelchenko, likened Israel's settlement of the West Bank to the Russian occupation of Crimea.

In January 2020, Ukraine withdrew from the Committee on the Exercise of the Inalienable Rights of the Palestinian People (CEIRPP). This decision was approved by Ukrainian president Volodymyr Zelenskyy.

In November 2022, Ukraine supported a UN resolution that asked the International Court of Justice to investigate Israel's "prolonged occupation, settlement and annexation of Palestinian territory". In response, Israel summoned and admonished the Ukrainian ambassador. Shortly after, in "an apparent act of retaliation", Israel did not vote for a UN resolution calling on Russia to pay reparations for invading Ukraine.

During the Gaza war, Ukraine's Foreign Ministry condemned attacks on Palestinian civilians in Gaza and supported a two-state solution to the conflict. More than 300 Ukrainian scholars, activists and artists expressed solidarity with Palestinians in an open letter. Most of the Ukrainian community in Gaza was forced to flee the country because of the war.

On 2 June 2024, Zelenskyy reiterated Ukraine's support for a two-state solution. He remarked that, while Ukraine has supported Israel's right for self-defence against Hamas during the attacks in October 2023, during the humanitarian crisis Ukraine said that it is ready to help Gaza humanitarianly and it "will do everything so that Israel stops and civilians do not suffer."

On 18 July 2024, Ukraine sent a gift of 1,000 tons of its wheat flour to the Palestinian territories. According to the foreign ministry, the package will be enough to support more than 100,000 Palestinian families for a month.

== See also ==
- Comparisons between the Gaza war and the Russo-Ukrainian war
- Foreign relations of Palestine
- Foreign relations of Ukraine
