= Siberia Airlines Flight 1812 =

2001 aircraft shootdown over the Black Sea

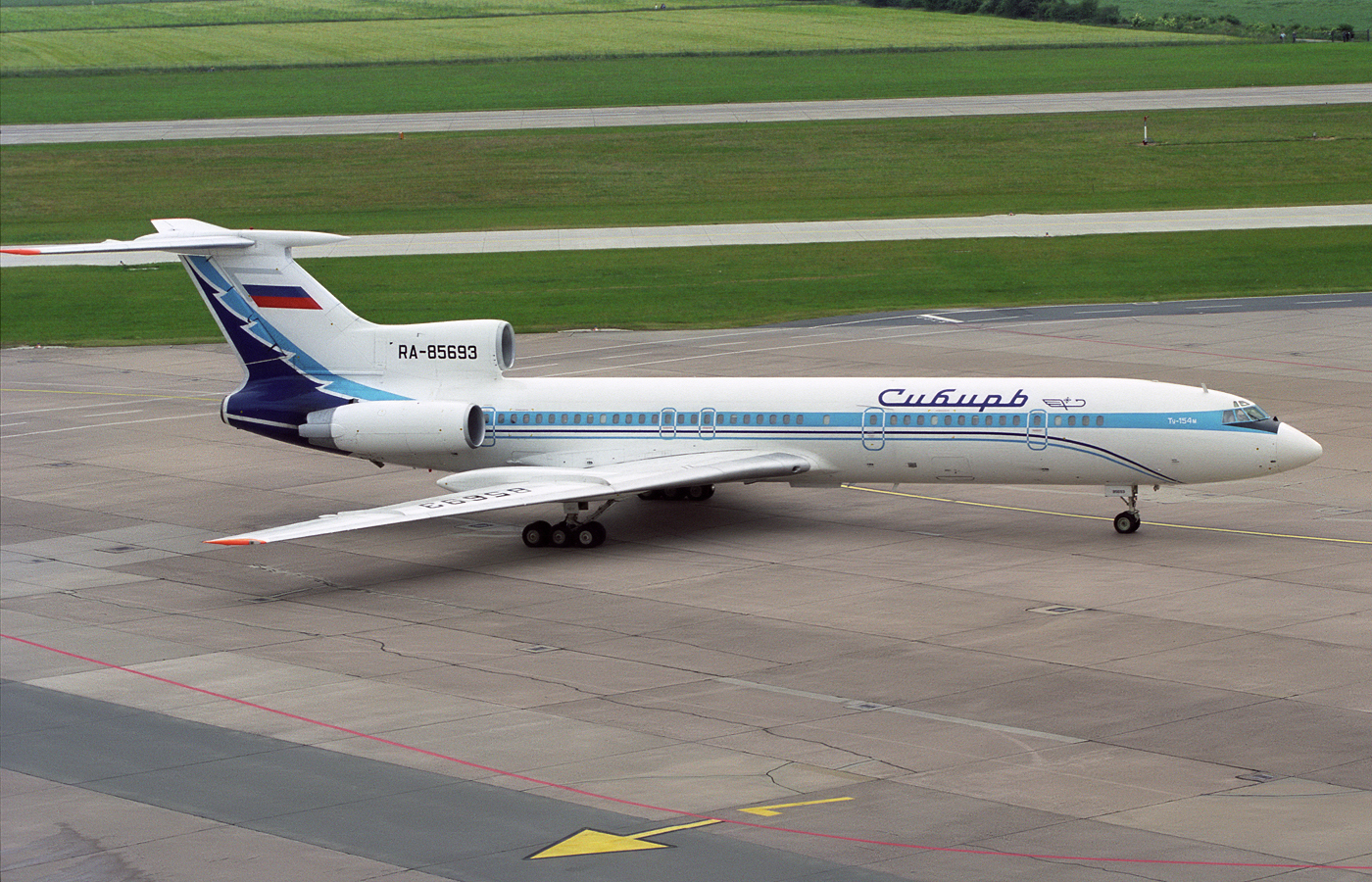
- RA-85693, the aircraft involved, pictured in 2000

Shootdown
- Date: 4 October 2001
- Summary: Accidental shootdown by Ukrainian S-200 missile
- Site: Black Sea; 42°11′N 37°37′E

Aircraft
- Aircraft type: Tupolev Tu-154M
- Operator: Siberia Airlines
- IATA flight No.: S71812
- ICAO flight No.: SBI1812
- Call sign: SIBERIAN 1812
- Registration: RA-85693
- Flight origin: Ben Gurion Airport; Tel Aviv, Israel
- Destination: Tolmachevo Airport; Novosibirsk, Russia
- Occupants: 78
- Passengers: 66
- Crew: 12
- Fatalities: 78
- Survivors: 0

Siberia Airlines Flight 1812 was a commercial flight shot down by the Ukrainian Air Force over the Black Sea on 4 October 2001, en route from Tel Aviv, Israel, to Novosibirsk, Russia. The aircraft, a Soviet-made Tupolev Tu-154, carried 66 passengers and 12 crew members. There were no survivors. The crash site is about 190 km west-southwest of the Black Sea resort of Sochi, 140 km north of the Turkish coastal town of Fatsa and 350 km south-southeast of Feodosiya in Crimea. The crash was caused by a missile launched during joint Ukrainian-Russian military air-defence exercises at the Russian-controlled training ground of the 31st Russian Black Sea Fleet Research center on Cape Opuk near the city of Kerch in Crimea. Ukraine eventually admitted that it might have caused the crash, probably by an errant S-200 missile fired by its armed forces. Ukraine paid $15 million to surviving family members of the 78 victims (US$200,000 per victim).

== History ==
Flight 1812 departed Tel Aviv with a destination of Novosibirsk. It proceeded at an altitude of 36,000 feet (11,000 m) over the Black Sea when the Russian ground control center in Sochi suddenly lost contact with the airliner. Soon afterward, the pilot of an Armenian plane crossing the sea nearby reported seeing the Russian plane explode before it crashed into the sea at about 13:45 Moscow time (09:45 GMT). Most of the passengers were Israelis visiting their relatives in Russia. No one on board survived.

A national day of mourning was instituted in Israel with a moment of silence, flags at half-mast and schools teaching special lessons on the tragedy. A monument to the victims was built in the Ben Shemen moshav.

Location of crash site; departure and destination airports

Occurring less than a month after the September 11 attacks in the United States, the crash was initially suspected by Russian officials to be an act of terrorism, and they denied American reports that it was caused by an S-200 missile. Later, the Moscow-based Interstate Aviation Committee ruled that the crash was caused by an accidental Ukrainian S-200 missile strike during military training exercises staged off Cape Opuk in Crimea.

Initial private assessments by American military officials determined that the crash was caused by an S-200 missile that had overshot its target drone—which had been destroyed successfully by an S-300 fired at the same time—and instead of self-destructing, locked on the passenger plane about 250 kilometres (160 mi) further away and detonated 15 metres (50 ft) over the plane.

Russian officials dismissed the American claim as "unworthy of attention," and Russian president Vladimir Putin told the press the next day that "the weapons used in those exercises had such characteristics that make it impossible for them to reach the air corridor through which the plane was moving." Ukrainian military officials initially denied that their missile had brought down the plane; they reported that the S-200 had been launched seaward and had successfully self-destructed. Defense ministry spokesman Konstantin Khivrenko noted that "neither the direction nor the range (of the missiles) correspond to the practical or theoretical point at which the plane exploded."

However, some Ukrainian officials later admitted that their military had probably shot down the airliner. Ukrainian officials speculated that water interference caused the missile to veer off course. Ukraine reportedly banned the testing of Buk, S-300 and similar missile systems for a period of seven years following this incident.

On 7 October 2001, it was reported that the main fuselage of the aircraft, believed to contain the black box recorder, was thought to be at a depth of 1,000 metres (3,300 ft), which was too deep for divers to retrieve.

== Crew ==
- Captain: Evgeny Viktorovich Garov, 42 (Russian: Евгений Викторович Гаров)
- First Officer: Boris Alexandrovich Levchugov, 37 (Russian: Борис Александрович Левчугов)
- Flight Engineer: Valery Glebovich Laptev, 37 (Russian: Валерий Глебович Лаптев)
- Second Flight Engineer: Sergei Ivanovich Lebedinskiy, 37 (Russian: Сергей Иванович Лебединский)
- Navigator: Konstantin Yurievich Revtov, 42 (Russian: Константин Юрьевич Ревтов)
- Flight Technician: Konstantin Petrovich Shcherbakov, 37 (Russian: Константин Петрович Щербаков)
- Flight Inspector: Viktor Viktorovich Alekseev, 52 (Russian: Виктор Викторович Алексеев)
- Senior Flight Attendant: Vladimir Dmitrievich Khomyakov, 51 (Russian: Владимир Дмитриевич Хомяков)
- Flight Attendant: Natalya Georgievna Kostenko, 45 (Russian: Наталья Георгиевна Костенко)
- Flight Attendant: Alexander Gennadievich Savich, 34 (Russian: Александр Геннадиевич Савич)
- Flight Attendant: Elena Vladimirovna Gusarova, 32 (Russian: Елена Владимировна Гусарова)
- Flight Attendant: Igor Viktorovich Voronkov, 42 (Russian: Игорь Викторович Воронков)

== Compensation payments ==
=== Israeli citizens ===
On 20 November 2003, an ex gratia compensation agreement was signed between the governments of Ukraine and Israel. It was later ratified by the relatives of the victims. In addition to compensation issues, the agreement stated that "Ukraine is not legally responsible for the accident that occurred to the plane and free of any obligations regarding it." Commenting on the agreement, Gen. Oleksandr Kuz'muk, the former minister of defense who lost his job after the accident, told media that "the payments were a humane action, not the admission of guilt."

=== Russian citizens ===
Ukraine agreed to pay the families of each of the 38 Russian victims the sum of $200,000, the same amount that it had paid to the families of the 40 Israeli victims. The settlement was ratified by the Russian parliament in May 2004 and President Vladimir Putin signed it into law in June 2004.

=== Additional compensation claims ===
==== Pechersk local court ====
Some relatives of the crash victims refused to accept the compensation offered by Ukraine. They brought a civil suit against the Ukrainian government to Pechers'ky local court in Kyiv. During the court hearings, Ministry of Defence of Ukraine representatives stated that the airplane "could not be brought down by a Ukrainian missile" according to the forensic examination of the plane's debris, radar information and technical capabilities of the missiles. They also argued that the Soviet-made identification friend or foe system of the missile in question would have prevented it from striking the Soviet-made airliner. The lawyer representing the plaintiffs argued that the fault of the Ukrainian government was effectively proven by the fact that it had negotiated the compensations for relatives of the Israeli victims.

==== Appeals in courts ====
On 22 August 2007, a Kyiv appeals court dismissed the victims' relatives' suit against the defence ministry, ruling that military of Ukraine bore no liability for the accident. The court decision conflicts with report of the IAC group that had investigated the accident on Russia's behalf.

==== Siberian Airlines lawsuit ====
Between 2003 and 2005, the Ukrainian government paid $15.6 million in compensation to the relatives of the victims. In 2004, Siberian Airlines filed a lawsuit against the Ministry of Defence of Ukraine and the Ukraine State Treasury at a Kyiv court, seeking more than $15.3 million in compensation for the loss of the jet. However, in September 2011 the Kyiv Interregional Commercial Court of Appeal rejected a compensation claim from Siberian Airlines. An appeal to Kyiv's Economic Court of Appeals was rejected in May 2012. The ruling was further upheld in December 2012 by Ukraine's Supreme Commercial Court. As of January 2013, the court proceedings continued, but they were disrupted by the Maidan protests.

== Memorial services ==
Memorial services were held in Israel, Sochi and Novosibirsk.

== See also ==
- Azerbaijan Airlines Flight 8243
- Itavia Flight 870
- Iran Air Flight 655
- Israel–Russia relations
- Israel–Ukraine relations
- Korean Air Lines Flight 007
- List of airliner shootdown incidents
- Korean Air Lines Flight 902
- Malaysia Airlines Flight 17
- Ukraine International Airlines Flight 752
- 2003 Baghdad DHL attempted shootdown incident
- Russia–Ukraine relations
