= Yossi Sheffi =

Israeli-American academic

- יוסי שפי
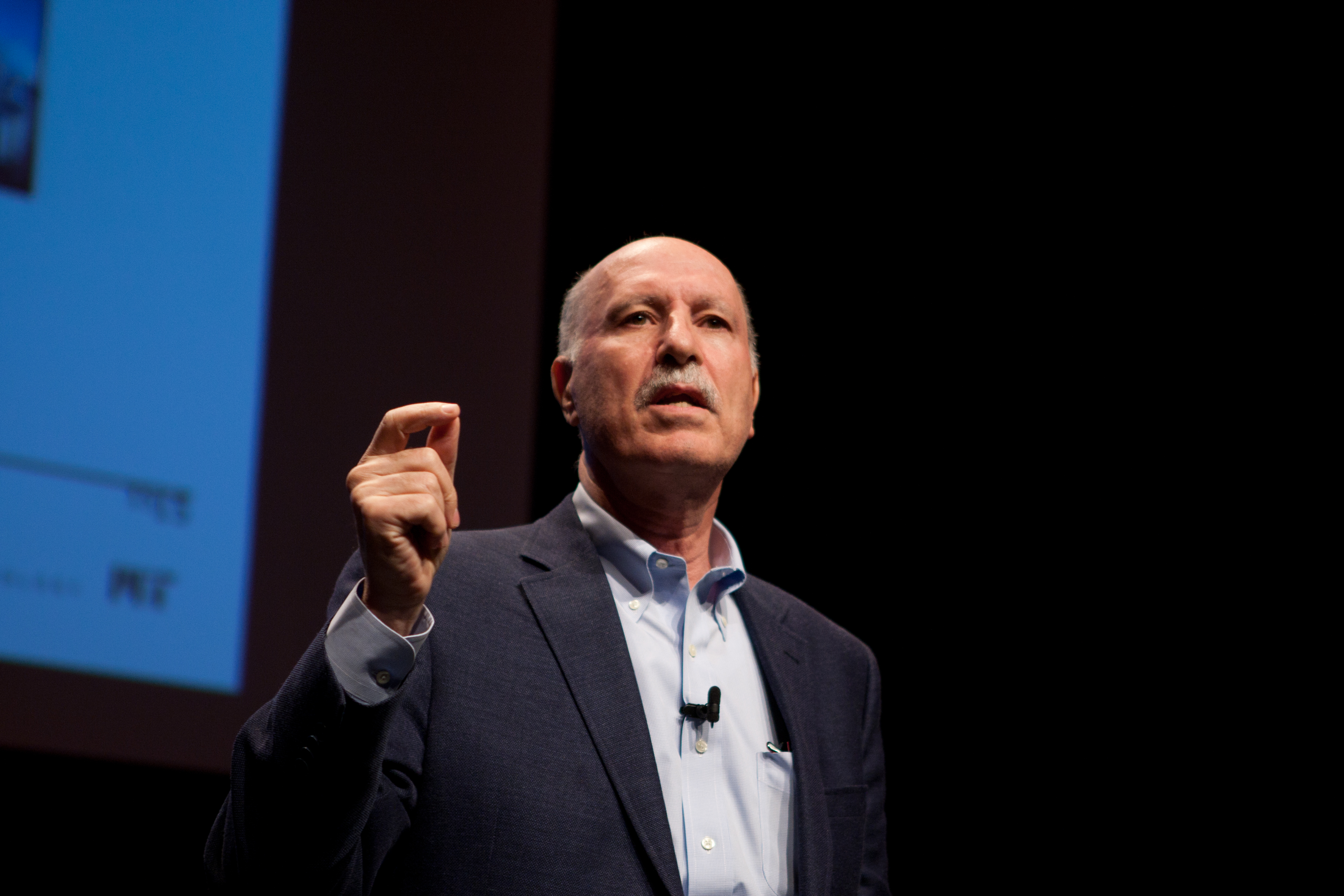
- Born: April 10, 1948 (age 78); Jerusalem, Mandatory Palestine
- Education: Technion – Israel Institute of Technology (BSc); Massachusetts Institute of Technology (MS, PhD)
- Known for: Logistics and Supply Chain Management
- Scientific career
- Fields: Supply chain management, System optimization
- Workplaces: Massachusetts Institute of Technology
- Thesis: Transportation Networks Equilibration with Discrete Choice Models (1978)
- Doctoral advisor: Fred Moavenzadeh; Carlos Daganzo
- Doctoral students: Cynthia Barnhart; Hani Mahmassani

Yossi Sheffi (Hebrew: יוסי שפי; born April 10, 1948) is the Elisha Gray II Professor of Engineering Systems at the Massachusetts Institute of Technology. He founded or co-founded five companies, has authored numerous scientific publications and nine books.

== Education ==
Sheffi obtained his BSc from the Technion in Israel in 1975, his SM from MIT in 1977, and PhD from MIT in 1978. He now resides in Boston, Massachusetts.

== Life and work ==
Yossi Sheffi has served as the Director of the MIT Center for Transportation and Logistics since 1992. From 2007 to 2012 he was the Director of the MIT Engineering Systems Division. He is the founding Director of MIT's Master of Supply Chain Management degree, established in 1998. In 2003 he launched the Zaragoza Logistics Center, situated in PLAZA, the largest logistics park in Europe. In 2008 he launched the Center for Latin-American Logistics Innovation in Bogota, Colombia. In 2011 he launched the Malaysia Institute for Supply Chain Innovation in Kuala Lumpur.

== Publications ==
Sheffi is the author of nine books: Urban Transportation Networks, a textbook on transportation networks optimization (Prentice Hall, October 1985), The Resilient Enterprise: Overcoming Vulnerability for Competitive Advantage (MIT Press, October 2005) and Logistics Clusters: Delivering Value and Driving Growth (MIT Press, October 2012), The Power of Resilience: How the Best Companies Manage the Unexpected, (MIT Press, September 2015), Balancing Green: When to Embrace Sustainability in a Business (and When Not To) (MIT Press, 2018), The New (Ab)Normal: Reshaping Business and Supply Chain Strategy Beyond Covid-19 (CTL Media, 2020), A Shot in the Arm: How Science, Engineering, and Supply Chains Converged to Vaccinate the World (CTL Media, 2021), Strategic Planning for Dynamic Supply Chains: Preparing for Uncertainty Using Scenarios (Palgrave, 2022), and The Magic Conveyor Belt: Supply Chains, AI, and the Future of Work (CTL Media, 2023).

The Wall Street Journal, in a review of The Resilient Enterprise, said the book is "the timely analysis of an important – and often overlooked – aspect of business strategy. Mr. Sheffi argues that crisis control can be a competitive advantage for companies that get it right."

The Resilient Enterprise was selected by the Financial Times as one of the best Business Books of 2005. "...Sheffi shows managers how to build flexibility into all areas of their businesses," the review said.

The book received "Book of the Year" award in the category of Business and Economics from Forward magazine.

Academic publications include:

- Yossi Sheffi, "Business continuity: a systematic approach." Global Business and the Terrorist Threat. Ed. Harry W. Richardson, Peter Gordon, and James E. Moore II, UK: Edward Elgar Publishing Limited, 2009. 32–41.
- Yossi Sheffi and J. Rice, "A Supply Chain View of the Resilient Enterprise," MIT Sloan Management Review, 47 (1): 41–48, fall 2005.
- Yossi Sheffi, "Preparing for the Big One," IEE Manufacturing Engineer, 84 (5): 12–15, Oct/Nov 2005.
- Yossi Sheffi, "The Tug of War," (HBR Case Study), Harvard Business Review, 83 (1): 39–52, September 2005.
- Yossi Sheffi, "Combinatorial Auctions in the Procurement of Transportation Services," Interfaces, 34 (4): 245–252, July–August 2004.
- Yossi Sheffi, "Demand variability and Supply Chain Flexibility," in G. Prockl (Ed.) Contributions in Logistics, University of Nürnberg, March 2004.
- Yossi Sheffi, "RFID and the Innovation Cycle," International Journal of Logistics management, 15 (1), 2004.

Non-academic publications include:

- Yossi Sheffi, "Manage Risk Through Resilience," ChiefExecutiveNet, December 2, 2005
- Yossi Sheffi, "Building a Resilient Supply Chain," The Harvard Business Review Supply Chain Strategy, October 2005
- Yossi Sheffi, "Poker and Random Bunching," The Tech, October 31, 2006
- Yossi Sheffi, "Demand for Steady Supply", Financial Times, August 22, 2005
- Yossi Sheffi, "Fixing Government after Katrina," The Boston Globe, September 19, 2005
- Yossi Sheffi, "The New (Ab)Normal: Reshaping Business and Supply Chain Strategy Beyond Covid-19" (2020)

== Entrepreneurship ==
Yossi Sheffi has founded and co-founded five companies:

- LogiCorp Inc. was a third party logistics company founded as a subsidiary of Rockwell International by Sheffi and Lorne Darnell in 1988 and was bought from Rockwell by Sheffi and his partners in 1991. LogiCorp was acquired by Ryder System in April 1994.
- Sheffi co-founded the Princeton Transportation Consulting Group (PTCG), a software company developing optimization-based decision support systems for the motor carrier industry, in 1987. In 1992 he bought the company from his three partners, develop it further and in 1996 he sold the company to Sabre Holdings.
- Sheffi co-founded Syncra Systems, a provider of supply chain intelligence and collaboration solutions in 1997 and served as chairman of the board until 2002. In 2004 the company was acquired by Retek Inc. which was in turn acquired by Oracle Inc.
- Sheffi co-founded e-Chemicals Inc., an e-commerce distributor of industrial chemicals, in 1998 with funding from Internet Capital Group (ICG). In December 2000, e-Chemicals was acquired by Aspen Technology.
- Sheffi founded Logistics.com, a transportation, logistics and supply chain management optimization software provider in January 2000 with funding from Internet Capital Group. In 2003 the company was acquired by Manhattan Associates, Inc.

== Major honors and awards ==
- 2011 Doctor Honoris Causa from University of Zaragoza, Spain
- 2009 Aragón International Prize from Government of Aragón, Spain
- 2009 Eccles Medal from International Society of Logistics
- 2005 Book of the Year from ForeWord Magazine.
- 2005 One of Best Business Books of Year by Financial Times
- 1998 Distinguished Service Award from the Council of Supply Chain Management Professionals

== Media appearances ==
In an interview with CIO Magazine entitled "Captain Contingency", Sheffi gave his views on what companies should be doing to emulate firms like Wal-Mart and The Home Depot that perform well in natural disasters. "...Communication is key and I’ve found that resilient companies communicate obsessively."

In a 2009 interview with the MIT Sloan Management Review, Sheffi said that economics would take precedence over the environment in the short term: "The next two, three years will be utterly dominated by the financial crisis, so I’m really hesitant to talk beyond that because every decision counts...For companies, it will boil down to having to make money."

In a December 28, 2009 New York Times op-ed article on Airport Security prompted by the near-miss attack on a Detroit-bound plane by a Nigerian man, Sheffi stated: "We were lucky that in addition to the malfunctioning bomb, there were no further attacks — so treating the terrorist as a common criminal did not cause more disasters. But would this be the same next time?"

Other interviews and profiles:

- "Resilience Revisited: Yossi Sheffi from MIT discusses new vulnerabilities in the supply chain", The CIP Exchange, Fall 2009.
- "Strategy for being competitive", INCAE Business Review, May–August 2009.
- "Navigating the Energy Crunch," ON - Life in Information, Number 3, 2008.
- "Cheap oil: a thing of the past," Deutsche Post World Net, August 2008.
- "El proceso logístico es lo único que no se puede copier en ningún sitio", Expansión (Spanish Edition), February 25, 2006.
- "Yossi Sheffi: The Thought Leader Interview", Strategy & Business, Issue 42, Spring 2006.

In 2010 Sheffi participated in CNBC's Executive Vision program dealing with global logistics. He explained the role of logistics software in creating the efficiency of the global logistics companies.

In November 2010, Sheffi was interviewed on Bloomberg Television in a segment dealing with air security cargo. He analyzed the possibilities and costs of increased cargo scanning on cargo planes.

On December Sheffi was interviewed on CNN's Anderson Cooper 360, explaining the reasons for the airline delays that hit the US Northeast. A more complete explanation was published by the MIT Press blog.

In 2010, Sheffi weighed in on the question of security for international flights that cross but do not touch down in the United States in The Washington Post. "We have tens of millions of packages flying almost every night," Sheffi said. "…There has to be a balance between acceptable risk and economics."

In 2019, at an MIT faculty meeting, Sheffi defended MIT's decision to take money from convicted sex offender Jeffrey Epstein, arguing that "MIT did nothing illegal" and comparing those who said MIT should have categorically refused the money to "children who only deal in absolutes."
