= Kumares C. Sinha =

Indian-American engineer, researcher, and educator

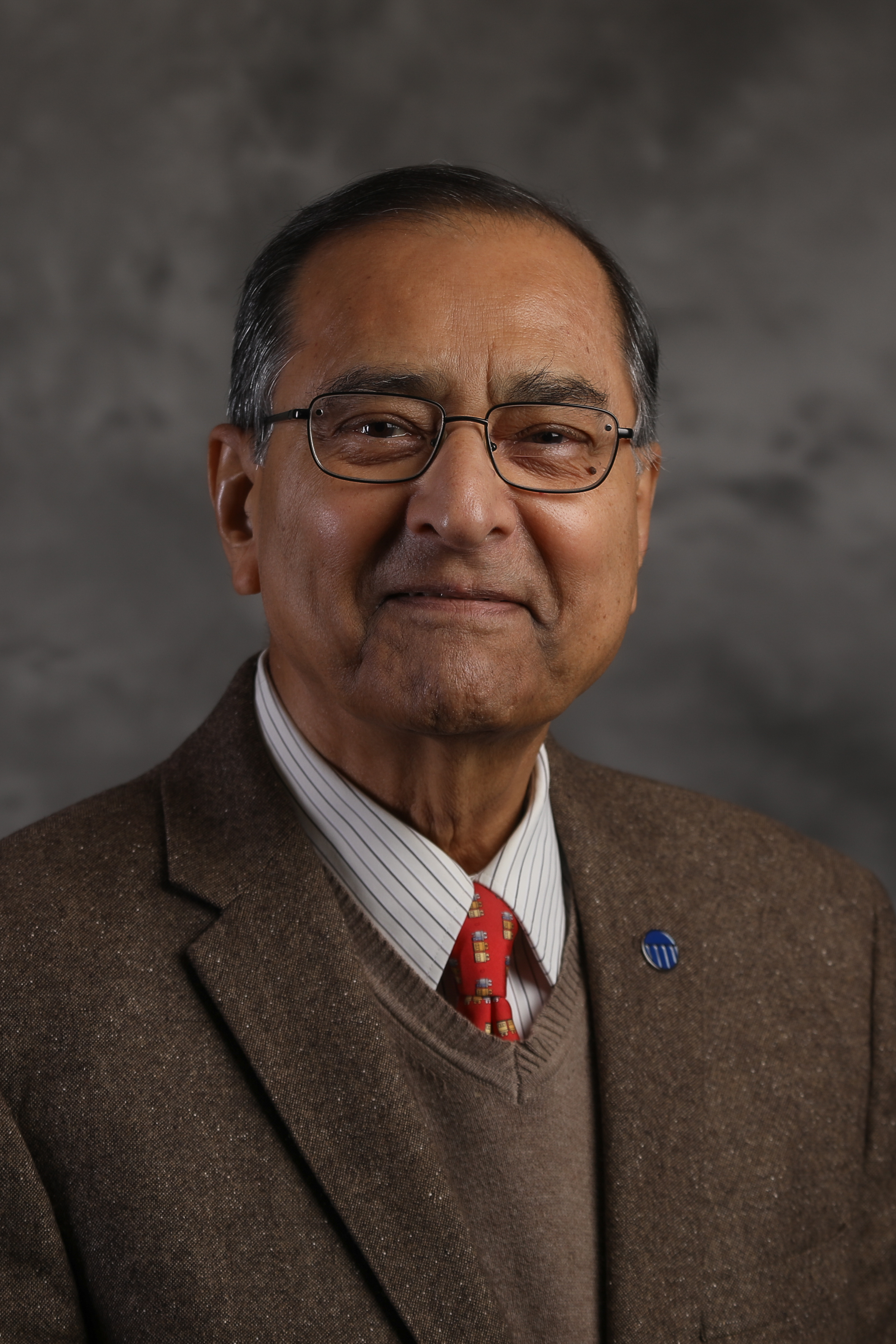
Sinha in 2024

Kumares C. Sinha is an Indian-American engineer, researcher and educator known for contributions to transportation systems analysis, transportation infrastructure economics and management, transportation safety, and the use of emerging technologies in transportation. He has served as Edgar B. and Hedwig M. Olson Distinguished Professor of Civil Engineering at Purdue University. since 1998.

== Career ==
Sinha received his bachelor's degree from Jadavpur University in India in 1961, and his master's and doctoral degrees from the University of Connecticut in 1966 and 1968, respectively. He was a faculty member at Marquette University for six years before joining the school of civil engineering at Purdue in 1974. Sinha served as head of the transportation and infrastructure systems area in the school of civil engineering at Purdue from 1981 to 2001 and director of the joint transportation research program of Purdue University and the Indiana Department of Transportation from 1995 to 2010. He was a visiting professor of civil engineering at the Massachusetts Institute of Technology in fall 1980 and at the Indian Institute of Technology-Roorkee, India, in spring 1981. He was also Lockheed Martin Guest Professor of Engineering and Computer Science at the University of Central Florida during 2015–2016 and Hagler Fellow and eminent scholar-in-residence at Texas A&M University during 2016–2017. He has been an honorary or a guest professor at five universities in China.

Sinha conducts research in the areas of highway infrastructure planning, engineering and management. One of his chief contributions is the development of an integrated approach to highway-asset-management based on facility condition modeling, treatment effectiveness and life-cycle costing. Sinha's studies on system performance, costing, and network optimization have informed pavement, bridge and safety management systems developed by the American Association of State Highway and Transportation Officials (AASHTO) and the U.S. Army Corps of Engineers. He has also served as a consultant for the World Bank and the United Nations Environmental Program, conducting transportation systems analysis and planning in countries such as Bangladesh, China, Georgia, India, Iran, Nepal, Palestine and Yemen, among others. He was one of the early advocates for the use of advanced technologies in transportation. He and his colleagues at Purdue were early researchers conducting experiments for shared mobility service. Sinha's most recent work examines the impacts of autonomous transportation and connected vehicles. He is the co-author (with Samuel Labi) of Transportation Decision Making: Principles of Project Development and Programming (Wiley & Sons, 2007).

Sinha is the Editor-in-Chief Emeritus of the Journal of Transportation Engineering (ASCE), and he serves on the editorial boards of Transportation and Statistics (Bureau of Transportation Statistics, US DOT), the Journal of Transportation in Developing Economies (Springer), the Journal of Transportation (Institute of Transportation Engineers), and the Archives of Transport Quarterly (Polish Academy of Sciences). He has served as President of the Transportation & Development Institute of the American Society of Civil Engineers (ASCE), President of the Research and Education Division of the American Road and Transportation Builders Association (ARTBA), and President of the Council of University Transportation Centers (CUTC). He also served as a member of the Executive Committee of the Transportation Research Board (2011–2017), Strategic Highway Research Program Oversight Committee (2009–2015), Blue Ribbon Panel of Experts, US National Surface Transportation Policy and Revenue Study Commission (2006–2007), and Federal Advisory Council on Transportation Statistics (2001–2005).

== Honors and awards ==
Sinha was elected member of the National Academy of Engineering in 2008 “for contributions to the advancement of highway infrastructure engineering and management and to the education of transportation professionals worldwide.” He was recognized as a Distinguished University Alumnus of Jadavpur University, India in 2017, an Honorary Member of the American Society of Civil Engineers in 2005 and a member of the University of Connecticut School of Engineering's Academy of Distinguished Engineers (2004). Sinha has received many awards including the inaugural Lifetime Achievement Award presented at the 8th International Conference on Maintenance and Rehabilitation of Pavements (2016), the ASCE James Laurie Prize (2011), the Transportation Research Board's Roy W. Crum Award (2009), the Council of University Transportation Centers Lifetime Achievement Award for University Transportation Education and Research (2004), the Wilbur S. Smith Distinguished Transportation Educator Award (2002) given jointly by the Institute of Transportation Engineers and several other professional organizations, the ASCE Francis C. Turner Lecture Award (2001), the American Road and Transportation Builders Association Steinberg Award (1999), the ASCE Harland Bartholomew Award (1996), the Distinguished Engineering Alumni Award of the University of Connecticut (1995), the ASCE Arthur Wellington Prize (1992), the ASCE Frank M. Masters Transportation Engineering Award (1986), and the Fred Burggraf Award of the Transportation Research Board (1972). Sinha was also recognized as a National Associate of the National Academies in 2005 for his involvement in numerous committees and panels of the National Research Council.

== Publications ==
Fwa, T.F. and Sinha, K.C. (1986), A Unified Approach for Allocation of Highway Pavement Costs, Transportation Research –A, Vol. 20A, No. 3, 211–221.

Doherty, M.J., Sparrow, F. T. and Sinha, K. C. (1987), Public (Shared) Use of Autos: Mobility Enterprise Project, ASCE Journal of Transportation Engineering, Vol. 113, No. 1, 84–100.

Feighan, K.J., Shahin, M. Y., Sinha, K. C. and White, T. D. (1989), Application of Dynamic Programming and Other Mathematical Techniques to Pavement Management Systems, Transportation Research Record 1200, 90–98.

Sharaf, E. A., Shahin, M.Y. and Sinha (1989), Analysis of the Effect of Deferring Pavement Maintenance, Transportation Research Record 1205, 29–35.

Saito, M., Sinha, K.C. and Anderson, V. (1991), Statistical Models for the Estimation of Bridge Replacement Models, Transportation Research-A, Vol. 25A, No. 6, 339–350.

Karlaftis, M. G., Latoski, S., Richards, N. and Sinha, K.C. (1999), ITS Impacts on Safety and Traffic Management: An Investigation of Secondary Crash Causes, ITS Journal, Vol. 5, 39–52.

Sinha, K. C., Sustainability and Urban Public Transportation (2003), ASCE Journal of Transportation Engineering, Vol. 129, No. 4, 331–341.

Li, Z. and Sinha, K. C. (2004), Methodology for Multi-Criteria Decision-Making in Highway Asset Management, Transportation Research Record 1885, 79–87.

Bai, Q., Labi, S., Sinha, K. C. (2012). Tradeoff Analysis for Multiobjective Optimization in Transportation Asset Management by Generating Pareto Frontiers Using Extreme Points Non-dominated Sorting Genetic Algorithm II, ASCE Journal of Transportation Engineering, Vol. 138, No. 6, 798–806

Everett, S., Xiong, Y., Sinha, K. C. and Fricker (2013). Ex Post Facto Evaluation of Indiana’s Highway Investment Program, Transportation Research Record 2345, 24–30.

Kumar, I., Tyner, W. E. and Sinha, K. C. (2016). Input–output Life Cycle Environmental Assessment of Greenhouse Gas Emissions from Utility Scale Wind Energy in the United States, Energy Policy. 89: 294–301

Sinha, K.C., Labi, S. Agbelie, B., (2017). Transportation Infrastructure Asset Management in the New Millennium: Continuing Issues, and Emerging Challenges and Opportunities, Transportmetrica Part A: Transport Science 13(7), 591–606
